= Politics of Piedmont =

The politics of Piedmont, a region of Italy, takes place in the framework of an "anomalous presidential" representative democracy or prime-ministerial system with an executive presidency, whereby the president of Piedmont is the head of government, and of a pluriform multi-party system. Executive power is exercised by the regional government. Legislative power is vested in both the government and the Regional Council of Piedmont.

== Executive branch ==
The Regional Government (Giunta Regionale) is presided by the President of the Region (Presidente della Regione), who is elected for a five-year term and is composed by the President and the Ministers, who are currently 14, including a Vice President (Vice Presidente).

=== List of presidents ===
President		Term of office		Party	Coalition	Administration	Legislature
Presidents elected by the Regional Council of Piedmont (1970–1995)
1	Edoardo Calleri di Sala (1927–2002)	23 July 1970	21 December 1973	DC	DC • PSI • PSDI • PRI	Calleri di Sala	I (1970)
2	Gianni Oberto Tarena (1902–1980)	21 December 1973	21 July 1975	DC	DC • PSI • PSDI • PRI	Tarena	I (1970)
3	Aldo Vigilone (1923–1988)	21 July 1975	28 July 1980	PSI	PSI • PCI	Vigilone I	II (1975)
4	Ezio Enrietti (1936–2020)	28 July 1980	15 July 1983	PSI	PSI • PCI	Enrietti	III (1980)
3	Aldo Vigilone (1923–1988)	15 July 1983	1 August 1985	PSI	DC • PSI • PSDI • PRI • PLI	Vigilone II	III (1980)
5	Vittorio Beltrami (1926–2012)	1 August 1985	25 July 1990	DC	DC • PSI • PSDI • PRI • PLI	Beltrami	IV (1985)
6	Gian Paolo Brizio (1929–2008)	25 July 1990	16 March 1993	DC	DC • PSI • PSDI • PRI • PLI	Brizio I	V (1990)
6	Gian Paolo Brizio (1929–2008)	16 March 1993	12 June 1995	DC	DC • PSI • FdV • PDS • RI	Brizio II	V (1990)
Directly-elected presidents (since 1995)
7	Enzo Ghigo (b. 1953)	12 June 1995	17 April 2000	FI	FI • AN • CCD	Ghigo I	VI (1995)
7	Enzo Ghigo (b. 1953)	17 April 2000	27 April 2005	FI	FI • AN • LN • CCD	Ghigo II	VII (2000)
8	Mercedes Bresso (b. 1944)	27 April 2005	9 April 2010	DS; PD	DS • DL • PRC • FdV	Bresso	VIII (2005)
9	Roberto Cota (b. 1968)	9 April 2010	9 June 2014 (Note: Election invalidated for irregularities.)	LN	PdL • LN	Cota	IX (2010)
10	Sergio Chiamparino (b. 1948)	9 June 2014	6 June 2019	PD	PD • SEL	Chiamparino	X (2014)
11	Alberto Cirio (b. 1972)	6 June 2019	21 June 2024	FI	LN • FI • FdI	Cirio I	XI (2019)
11	Alberto Cirio (b. 1972)	21 June 2024	In office	FI	FdI • FI • LN	Cirio II	XII (2024)

== Legislative branch ==
The Regional Council of Piedmont (Consiglio Regionale del Piemonte) is composed of 60 members. 48 councilors are elected in provincial constituencies by proportional representation using the largest remainder method with a Droop quota and open lists, while 12 councillors (elected in bloc) come from a "regional list", including the President-elect. One seat is reserved for the candidate who comes second. If a coalition wins more than 50% of the total seats in the council with PR, only 6 candidates from the regional list will be chosen and the number of those elected in provincial constituencies will be 54. If the winning coalition receives less than 40% of votes, special seats are added to the council to ensure a large majority for the President's coalition.

The council is elected for a five-year term, but, if the President suffers a vote of no confidence, resigns or dies, under the simul stabunt, simul cadent clause introduced in 1999 (literally they will stand together or they will fall together), also the council is dissolved and a snap election is called.

=== Current composition ===
The Regional Council of Piedmont is currently composed of the following political groups:

Party	Seats	Status
Brothers of Italy (FdI)	13 / 51	Government
Democratic Party (PD)	13 / 51	Opposition
Forza Italia (FI)	7 / 51	Government
League (Lega)	6 / 51	Government
Cirio for President (CP)	5 / 51	Government
Greens and Left Alliance (AVS)	3 / 51	Opposition
Five Star Movement (M5S)	3 / 51	Opposition
United States of Europe (SUE)	1 / 51	Opposition

By coalition:

Party	Seats	Status
Centre-right coalition	31 / 51	Government
Centre-left coalition	17 / 51	Opposition
Five Star Movement	3 / 51	Opposition

== Local government ==
=== Provinces ===
Province	Inhabitants	President	Party	Election
Metropolitan City of Turin	2,282,197	Stefano Lo Russo (metropolitan mayor)	PD	2021
Alessandria (list)	428,826	Luigi Benzi	FdI	2024
Asti (list)	217,574	Simone Nosenzo	Ind. (FI)	2026
Biella (list)	179,685	Emanuele Ramella Pralungo	PD	2021
Cuneo (list)	590,421	Luca Robaldo	Ind. (FI)	2022
Novara (list)	370,525	Marco Caccia	FdI	2025
Verbano-Cusio-Ossola (list)	160,114	Giandomenico Albertella	Ind.	2025
Vercelli (list)	174,904	Davide Gilardino	FdI	2022

=== Municipalities ===
Provincial capitals

Municipality	Inhabitants	Mayor	Party	Election
Turin (list)	890,529	Stefano Lo Russo (metropolitan mayor)	PD	2021
Novara (list)	104,380	Alessandro Canelli	LN	2021
Alessandria (list)	93,943	Giorgio Abonante	PD	2022
Asti (list)	76,202	Maurizio Rasero	FI	2022
Cuneo (list)	56,081	Patrizia Manassero	PD	2022
Vercelli (list)	46,754	Roberto Scheda	FI	2024
Biella (list)	44,733	Marzio Olivero	FdI	2024
Verbania (list)	30,827	Giandomenico Albertella	Ind.	2024

Other municipalities

Cities with more than 45,000 inhabitants.

Municipality	Inhabitants	Mayor	Party	Election
Moncalieri	57,294	Paolo Montagna	Democratic Party	2020
Collegno	49,905	Francesco Casciano	Democratic Party	2019
Rivoli	48,791	Andrea Tagaroli	Lega Nord Piemont	2019
Nichelino	48,123	Giampietro Tolardo	Italian Left	2021
Settimo Torinese	47,669	Elena Piastra	Democratic Party	2019

== Parties and elections ==
=== Latest regional election ===
The latest regional election took place on 8–9 June 2024. Incumbent president Alberto Cirio of Forza Italia, supported also by Brothers of Italy (FdI), Lega Piemonte and other parties, was re-elected. FdI was the most voted party, ahead of the Democratic Party.

8–9 June 2024 Piedmontese regional election results
Candidates	Votes	%	Seats	Parties	Votes	%	Seats
Alberto Cirio	1,055,752	56.13	6	Brothers of Italy	403,954	24.43	11
Alberto Cirio	1,055,752	56.13	6	Cirio for President	202,294	12.23	5
Alberto Cirio	1,055,752	56.13	6	Forza Italia	162,888	9.85	4
Alberto Cirio	1,055,752	56.13	6	League	155,522	9.40	4
Alberto Cirio	1,055,752	56.13	6	Us Moderates	11,441	0.69	–
Alberto Cirio	1,055,752	56.13	6	Total	936,098	56.60	24
Gianna Pentenero	630,853	33.54	1	Democratic Party	395.710	23.93	12
Gianna Pentenero	630,853	33.54	1	Greens and Left Alliance	107,095	6.48	3
Gianna Pentenero	630,853	33.54	1	United States of Europe	40,223	2.43	1
Gianna Pentenero	630,853	33.54	1	Pentenero for President	24,835	1.5	–
Gianna Pentenero	630,853	33.54	1	Environmentalist and Solidary Piedmont	14,536	0.88	–
Gianna Pentenero	630,853	33.54	1	Total	582,399	35.22	16
Sarah Disabato	144,420	7.68	–	Five Star Movement	99,806	6.04	3
Francesca Frediani	28,191	1.50	–	Popular Piedmont	19,377	1.17	–
Alberto Costanzo	21,565	1.15	–	Freedom	16,064	0.97	–
Total candidates	1,880,781	100.00	6	Total parties	1,653,744	100.00	43
Blank and invalid votes	170,048	8.49					
Registered voters/turnout	3,621,101	55.30					
Source: Ministry of the Interior – Election in Piedmont
