= Elections in Piedmont =

Italian regional elections

This page gathers the results of elections in Piedmont.

== Regional elections ==
=== Latest regional election ===
The latest regional election took place on 8–9 June 2024. Incumbent president Alberto Cirio of Forza Italia, supported also by Brothers of Italy (FdI), Lega Piemonte and other parties, was re-elected. FdI was the most voted party, ahead of the Democratic Party.

8–9 June 2024 Piedmontese regional election results
Candidates	Votes	%	Seats	Parties	Votes	%	Seats
Alberto Cirio	1,055,752	56.13	6	Brothers of Italy	403,954	24.43	11
Alberto Cirio	1,055,752	56.13	6	Cirio for President	202,294	12.23	5
Alberto Cirio	1,055,752	56.13	6	Forza Italia	162,888	9.85	4
Alberto Cirio	1,055,752	56.13	6	League	155,522	9.40	4
Alberto Cirio	1,055,752	56.13	6	Us Moderates	11,441	0.69	–
Alberto Cirio	1,055,752	56.13	6	Total	936,098	56.60	24
Gianna Pentenero	630,853	33.54	1	Democratic Party	395.710	23.93	12
Gianna Pentenero	630,853	33.54	1	Greens and Left Alliance	107,095	6.48	3
Gianna Pentenero	630,853	33.54	1	United States of Europe	40,223	2.43	1
Gianna Pentenero	630,853	33.54	1	Pentenero for President	24,835	1.5	–
Gianna Pentenero	630,853	33.54	1	Environmentalist and Solidary Piedmont	14,536	0.88	–
Gianna Pentenero	630,853	33.54	1	Total	582,399	35.22	16
Sarah Disabato	144,420	7.68	–	Five Star Movement	99,806	6.04	3
Francesca Frediani	28,191	1.50	–	Popular Piedmont	19,377	1.17	–
Alberto Costanzo	21,565	1.15	–	Freedom	16,064	0.97	–
Total candidates	1,880,781	100.00	6	Total parties	1,653,744	100.00	43
Blank and invalid votes	170,048	8.49					
Registered voters/turnout	3,621,101	55.30					
Source: Ministry of the Interior – Election in Piedmont

=== List of previous regional elections ===
- 1970 Piedmontese regional election
- 1975 Piedmontese regional election
- 1980 Piedmontese regional election
- 1985 Piedmontese regional election
- 1990 Piedmontese regional election
- 1995 Piedmontese regional election
- 2000 Piedmontese regional election
- 2005 Piedmontese regional election
- 2010 Piedmontese regional election
- 2014 Piedmontese regional election
- 2019 Piedmontese regional election

== Italian general elections ==
- 1946 Italian general election in Piedmont
- 1948 Italian general election in Piedmont
- 1953 Italian general election in Piedmont
- 1958 Italian general election in Piedmont
- 1963 Italian general election in Piedmont
- 1968 Italian general election in Piedmont
- 1972 Italian general election in Piedmont
- 1976 Italian general election in Piedmont
- 1979 Italian general election in Piedmont
- 1983 Italian general election in Piedmont
- 1987 Italian general election in Piedmont
- 1992 Italian general election in Piedmont
- 1994 Italian general election in Piedmont
- 1996 Italian general election in Piedmont
- 2001 Italian general election in Piedmont
- 2006 Italian general election in Piedmont
- 2008 Italian general election in Piedmont
- 2013 Italian general election in Piedmont
- 2018 Italian general election in Piedmont
- 2022 Italian general election in Piedmont

== European Parliament elections ==
=== Latest EP election ===
Party	Votes	%
Brothers of Italy	569,893	30.4
Democratic Party	429,682	23.0
League	192,757	10.3
Forza Italia–Us Moderates	185,385	9.9
Five Star Movement	149,809	8.0
Greens and Left Alliance	140,816	7.5
United States of Europe	72,342	3.9
Action	60,340	3.2
Peace Land Dignity	42,364	2.3
Freedom	17,150	0.9
Popular Alternative	7,435	0.4
Valdostan Rally	3,961	0.2
Total	1,871,934	100.00

Source: Ministry of the Interior

=== List of previous EP elections ===
- 1979 European Parliament election in Piedmont
- 1984 European Parliament election in Piedmont
- 1989 European Parliament election in Piedmont
- 1994 European Parliament election in Piedmont
- 1989 European Parliament election in Piedmont
- 2004 European Parliament election in Piedmont
- 2009 European Parliament election in Piedmont
- 2014 European Parliament election in Piedmont
- 2019 European Parliament election in Piedmont
