= Gilberto Pichetto Fratin =

Italian politician (born 1954)

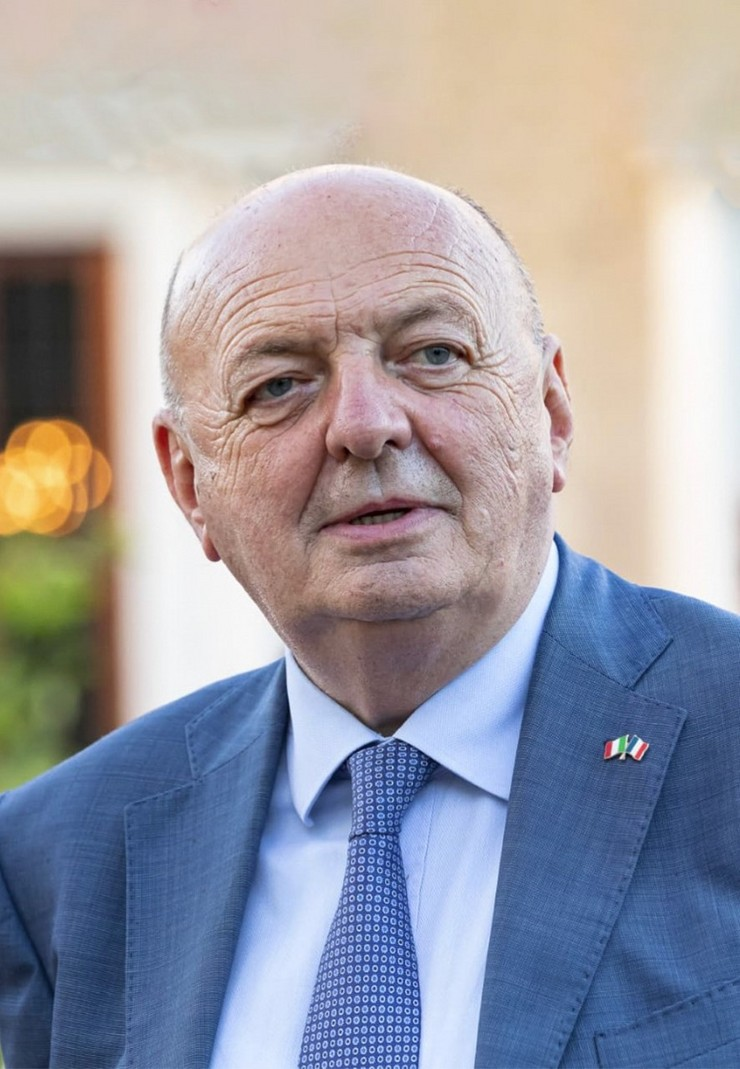
- Pichetto Fratin in 2022

Minister of the Environment and Energy Security
- Incumbent
- Assumed office 22 October 2022
- Prime Minister: Giorgia Meloni
- Preceded by: Roberto Cingolani

Member of the Chamber of Deputies
- Incumbent
- Assumed office 13 October 2022
- Constituency: Piedmont 1

Member of the Senate of the Republic
- In office 23 March 2018 – 12 October 2022
- Constituency: Vercelli
- In office 29 April 2008 – 14 March 2013
- Constituency: Piedmont

Personal details
- Born: 4 January 1954 (age 72) Veglio, Italy
- Party: Forza Italia (since 2013)
- Other political affiliations: PRI (1975–1994); FI (1994–2009); PdL (2009–2013)
- Education: University of Turin
- Profession: Tax advisor

Gilberto Pichetto Fratin (born 4 January 1954) is an Italian politician who is the Minister of the Environment and Energy Security of the Meloni government since 22 October 2022.

He is the lawmaker from 12 October 2022, and long-time exponent of Forza Italia, where he held the position of regional coordinator in Piedmont from 4 January 2014, to 18 October 2018. He was a long-term regional councilor in Piedmont (1995–2008; 2014–2018), vice president of the Piedmont Region from 3 April 2013, to 9 June 2014, and senator of the Republic in the XVI and XVIII legislatures.

== Biography ==
Born on 4 January 1954, in Veglio, a small village in the province of Biella, he attended the University of Turin, where he graduated in economics in 1978. He subsequently began the activity of tax advisor with a studio in Biella, enrolling in the Register of Financial Auditors, and for a few years he taught accounting, banking and commercial techniques and economic subjects in the higher technical institutes of Biella.

=== Political activity ===
His political activity began in the ranks of the Republican Party, when at 21 he entered the municipal council of Gifflenga, of which he would be part from 1975 to 1980; then between 1985 and 1994, he was vice mayor of Biella under the Christian Democrats Luigi Squillario, Luigi Petrini, and Gianluca Susta, as well as councilor with powers of sport, tourism, transport and toponymy until 1992, and later with those for urban planning and private construction.

With the descent into politics of Silvio Berlusconi, he joined Forza Italia, where in the regional elections in Piedmont in 1995, he ranks among his lists, in the motion of the Forza Italia representative Enzo Ghigo (former executive of the Publitalia-Fininvest group), being elected in the district of Biella in the Regional Council of Piedmont, later becoming president of the 1st Commission. Two years later, he was appointed councilor with regional powers for industry, crafts, and trade in the regional council of Enzo Ghigo. His positions were confirmed in 2000 in the second regional council of Ghigo, while in 2005, he remained in the opposition following the victory of the center-left coalition The Union in the regional election.

==== Election as senator ====
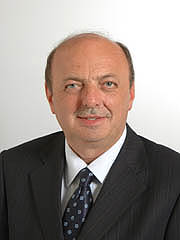
Pichetto Fratin in 2008

In the 2008 general election, he was a candidate for the Senate of the Republic, and elected senator for the People of Freedom and resigned from the regional council due to the incompatibility between the two offices. This leads him to renounce the election as director again in 2010; however, the new president Roberto Cota chooses him for the position of regional budget councilor.

Candidate to the Chamber of Deputies for the PdL in the 2013 general election, he is the first of the non-elected due to the victory of the center-left Italy. Common Good coalition, which manages to win the majority prize, and the choice of the secretary of the PdL Angelino Alfano, candidate and elected in several districts, to opt for that of Piedmont 1.

==== Vice-president of the Piedmont Region ====
On 3 April 2013, Pichetto Fratin was appointed by Roberto Cota as the new vice president of the Piedmont Region, obtaining the powers of finance, economic-financial planning, assets, legal, and litigation, as well as maintaining the leadership of the Budget Department, thus taking over from Ugo Cavallera, councilor for labor and social policies, resigned after having received the delegations to health from Cota.

On 16 November 2013, with the suspension of the activities of the People of Freedom, he joined the rebirth of Forza Italia, being appointed as regional coordinator in Piedmont by President Silvio Berlusconi on 4 January 2014.

==== Race to the Presidency of the Piedmont Region ====
After the cancellation of the TAR of the 2010 Piedmontese regional election, and the consequent loss of Roberto Cota as president, Pichetto Fratin was chosen by Forza Italia, strongly supported by Silvio Berlusconi and announced by his regional vice-coordinator in Piedmont Osvaldo Napoli, as candidate to the presidency of the Piedmont Region for the center-right coalition in view of the 2014 regional election. However, the acceptance of his candidacy is not unanimous: Brothers of Italy, who wanted to hold the coalition primary, chose in fact to support the former undersecretary of defense Guido Crosetto for the presidency, while the New Center-Right and the UdC, also for the primaries, focus on the new deputy minister of justice of the Renzi government Enrico Costa.

At the electoral round Pichetto Fratin is defeated, obtaining 22.09% of the votes compared to more than double (47.09%) of the former mayor of Turin Sergio Chiamparino (supported by the PD and the center-left), but manages to overcome the other candidates (Davide Bono of the 5 Star Movement, Crosetto, Costa and Mauro Filingeri for L'Altro Piemonte on the Left), obtains the seat in the regional council that is reserved for him as candidate for second place president.

==== Return to the Senate ====
Gilberto Pichetto Fratin in 2018

In the 2018 general election, he again became the senatoral candidate in the single-member district of Vercelli, for the center-right coalition in the Forza Italia, where he was re-elected senator with 46.97% of the votes against the candidate of the 5 Star Movement Ezio Conti (23.82%) and of the center-left, Democratic Party, Cristina Bargero (22.63%).

On 18 October 2018, he was commissioned and replaced for the coordination of Forza Italia in Piedmont by the new representative Paolo Zangrillo, after the modest result obtained by the party at the election of the year.

In December 2019, he was among the 64 signatories (41 of which from Forza Italia) for the confirmatory referendum on the cut of lawmakers: a few months earlier the Berlusconian senators had deserted the classroom on the occasion of the vote on the constitutional reform.

In 2020, he became leader of Forza Italia in the 5th Budget Commission of the Senate and National Head of the Finance and Budget Department of Forza Italia.

On 25 February 2021, he was indicated as Deputy Minister of Economic Development in the Draghi government, appointed by the Council of Ministers on 1 March, and alongside the League's minister Giancarlo Giorgetti. On 15 April, by decree of the President of the Republic, he was awarded the title of Deputy Minister. As deputy minister of economic development, he coordinated the automotive table, and followed the difficult drafting of the competition bill.

==== Election as lawmaker and minister ====
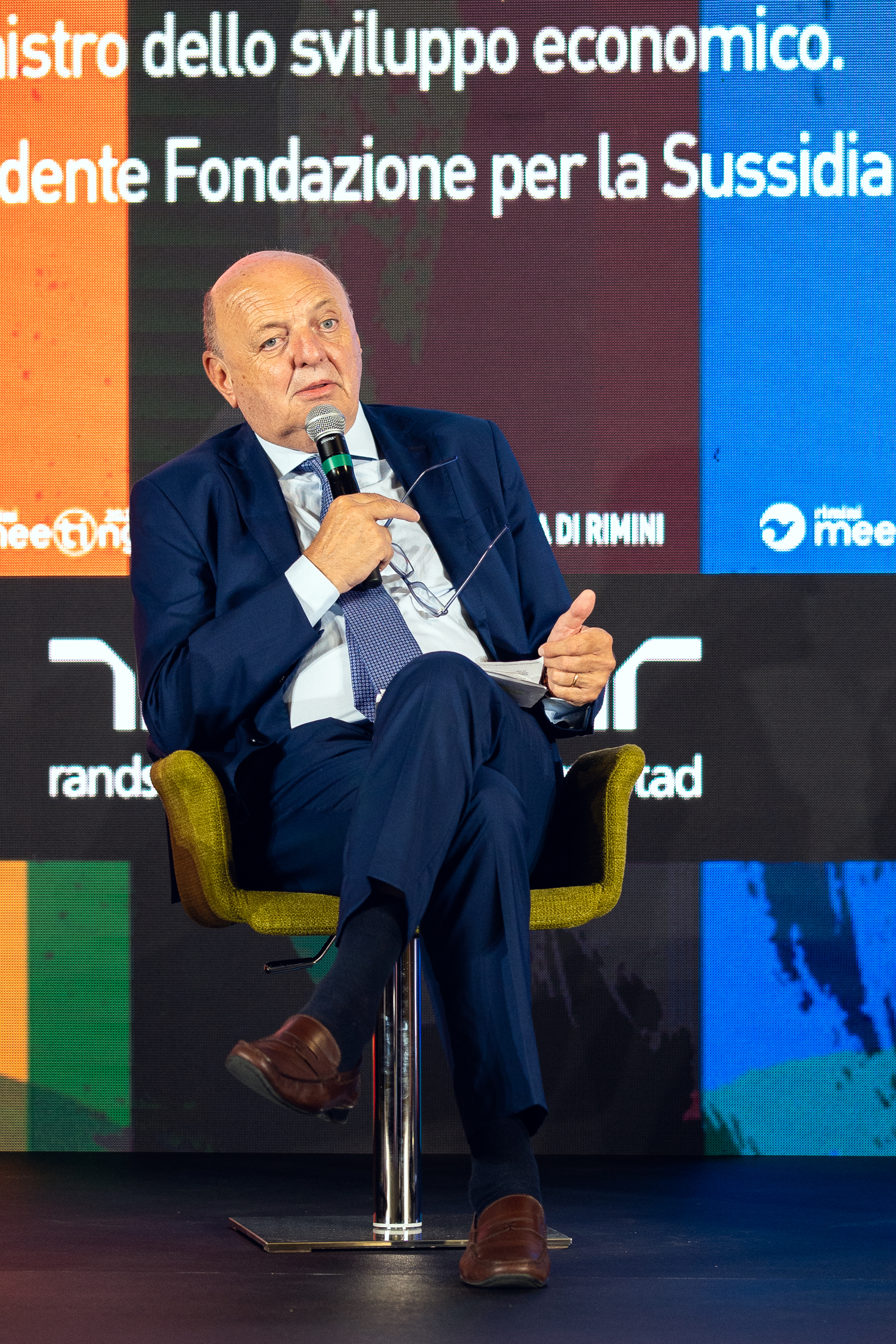
Pichetto Fratin in 2022

In the early general election of 25 September 2022, he was nominated for the Chamber of Deputies, as leader of Forza Italia in the Piedmont 1 – 02 plurinominal college in Chieri – Moncalieri, and was elected.

On 22 October 2022, he became Minister of the Environment and Energy Security of the Meloni government.

== Political positions ==
Considered close to Antonio Tajani within Forza Italia, he is in favor of the flat tax and the reintroduction of nuclear energy in Italy. He is against the plastic tax, on which he said "I consider it absurd because it affects our companies", and against the stop to the registration of cars with internal combustion engines, on which he stated that "It is a very ideological and unrealistic solution" on 8 June 2022, after the green light of the European Parliament for the Fit for 55 package.

== Congressional offices ==
=== 16th legislature ===
- Secretary of the 5th Budget Commission (from 22 May 2008, to 12 October 2010)
- Member of the 5th Budget Commission (from 13 October 2010, to 14 March 2013)
- Member of the 11th Commission for Labor, Social Security (from 26 June 2008, to 9 March 2011) (replacing Maria Elisabetta Alberti Casellati)
- Member of the congressional commission of inquiry on accidents at work, with particular regard to the so-called "white deaths" (from 15 July 2008, to 14 March 2013)

=== 18th legislature ===
- Treasurer of the Forza Italia Berlusconi President-UDC congressional group in the Senate of the Republic (from 11 April 2018, to 12 October 2022)
- Member of the 5th Budget Commission (from 21 June 2018, to 12 October 2022)
- Member of the Special Commission for the examination of urgent documents presented by the Government (from 29 March to 21 June 2018)

== Electoral history ==
Election	House	Constituency	Party	Votes	Result
2008	Senate of the Republic	Piedmont	PdL	– (Note: Elected in a closed list proportional representation system.)	Elected
2013	Chamber of Deputies	Piedmont 1	PdL	–	Not elected
2018	Senate of the Republic	Piedmont	FI	116,153	Elected
2022	Chamber of Deputies	Piedmont 1	FI	–	Elected
