= Lega Piemonte =

Regionalist political party in Piedmont, Italy

- Secretary: Riccardo Molinari
- Founded: 1987 (as MAP/AP); 1991 (as LNP); 2020 (as LP)
- Ideology: Regionalism; Federalism; Populism
- National affiliation: LN (1991–2020); LSP (since 2020)
- Regional Council of Piedmont: 23 / 51
- Chamber of Deputies (Piedmont seats): 13 / 45
- Senate (Piedmont seats): 5 / 22

Party flag
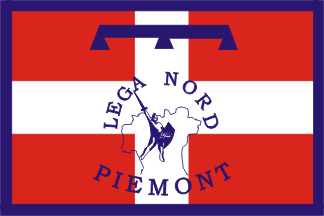

Website
- https://legapiemonte.org

Lega Piemonte (English: League Piedmont), whose complete name is Lega Piemonte per Salvini Premier (English: League Piedmont for Salvini Premier), is a regionalist political party active in Piedmont, Italy. Established in 1987, it was one of the founding national sections of Lega Nord (LN) in 1991 and became the regional section of Lega per Salvini Premier (LSP) in Piedmont in 2020. Since 2016, its leader is Riccardo Molinari, who is also LSP leader in the Chamber of Deputies. Roberto Cota, who led the party from 2001 to 2016, was the president of Piedmont from 2010 to 2014.

== History ==
=== Early years ===
The party was founded in April 1987 by splinters from the Piedmontese Union (Union Piemontèisa, UP) led by Gipo Farassino and Mario Borghezio. This group, which took the name of Piedmontese Autonomist Movement (Moviment Autonomista Piemontèis, MAP) and later Autonomist Piedmont (Piemont Autonomista, PA), wanted to make an alliance with Lega Lombarda of Umberto Bossi, in contrast with the Piedmontese Union leader Roberto Gremmo.

Autonomist Piedmont participated in the 1989 European Parliament election in Italy as part of the Bossi-led coalition Lega Lombarda – Alleanza Nord. From 1989 to 1990, it took part to the process of integration of the northern regionalist parties ahead of the 1990 Italian regional elections. In February 1991, it was merged into Lega Nord (English: Northern League, LN), taking the name Northern League Piedmont (Lega Nord Piemont, LNP). Farassino continued to lead the party through the process and after. In 1994, Farassino fended off a challenge by Oreste Rossi and was narrowly re-elected national secretary. Also in 1994, Bossi described the Movement for Piedmontese Regional Autonomy (Movimento per l'Autonomia Regionale Piemontese, MARP) as a precursor of Lega Nord. In the 1996 Italian general election, the party obtained its highest result at 18.2%. In 1997, Farassino was replaced as secretary by Domenico Comino.

=== Splits and recovery ===
In 1999, the party suffered a damaging split when Comino left the party over disagreements with Bossi, federal secretary of Lega Nord, and started his own party, which was integrated into the Autonomists for Europe (Autonomisti per l'Europa, ApE) in 2000. Troubled by splits and a significant loss of popular support (the party was reduced from 18.2% to 7.8% in just three years), the Northern League Piedmont entered into the House of Freedoms, the Silvio Berlusconi-led centre-right coalition.

From 2000 to 2005, the party took part to the regional government led by Enzo Ghigo of Forza Italia, which included Farassino (the long-time Northern League Piedmont leader) as regional minister of culture, while Cota was appointed president of the Regional Council of Piedmont. In 2001, Cota was elected national secretary of LNP with the mandate of re-building the party. Between 2006 and 2008, the party doubled its share of vote from 6.3% to 12.3%. Subsequently, Cota became floor leader of Lega Nord in the Chamber of Deputies. In the 2009 European Parliament election in Piedmont, the Northern League Piedmont increased again its share reaching 15.7%, its best electoral result since 1996.

=== Presidency of Piedmont ===
In the run-up of the 2010 Piedmontese regional election, Cota was chosen as joint candidate for president by The People of Freedom (PdL) and Lega Nord. During the campaign, Cota declared it was time to rewrite the history of Italian unification that was led by the Kingdom of Sardinia under the House of Savoy, arguing that Camillo Benso, Count of Cavour, the first Prime Minister of Italy, did not intend to unify the whole Italian Peninsula and later favoured a federalist reform of the new Kingdom of Italy, so Piedmont was to be once again independent. Cota, a republican with no nostalgia for the Italian monarchs, maintained that his message would do well and would overcome the relative weakness of the Northern League Piedmont if compared with Liga Veneta (English: Venetian League, VL) in Veneto and Lega Lombarda (English: Lombard League, LL) in Lombardy. In Cota's view, most of his support would come from industrial workers, including those of Southern Italian descent, and Catholics embarrassed by the then incumbent centre-left coalition Piedmontese president Mercedes Bresso's secularism.

In March 2010, Cota was narrowly elected president as he took 47.3% of the vote against Bresso's 46.9% and the Northern League Piedmont tripled the number of its seats in the regional council from four to twelve. Instrumental for Cota's victory were the strong showing of Beppe Grillo's Five Star Movement, which gained 3.7% of the vote mainly from centre-left voters, and the Catholic vote that tilted to Cota, disappointing the Union of the Centre, allied with Bresso in the election. Cota was forced to resign in early 2014 due to irregularities committed in 2010 by one of its supporting lists in filing the slates for the regional election and chose not to stand again. In the 2014 Piedmontese regional election, the centre-left Sergio Chiamparino of the Democratic Party was elected president of Piedmont and the Northern League Piedmonte was reduced to 7.3% of the vote.

=== From Cota to Molinari ===
During a hard-fought national congress in February 2016, Riccardo Molinari replaced Cota as national secretary. Molinari, who was supported by the new Lega Nord federal secretary Matteo Salvini, obtained 446 votes (55.1%) from delegates, while his opponent Gianna Gancia, the then incumbent national president chiefly supported by the then European Parliament member Gianluca Buonanno and her husband and party heavyweight Roberto Calderoli, received 364 votes (44.9%). Subsequently, Stefano Allasia was elected president.

In the 2018 Italian general election, the party obtained 22.6% of the vote, its best result ever. In the 2019 Piedmontese regional election, the party exceeded that result, gaining 37.1% of the vote. After the election, Molinari was elected leader of the federal party in the Chamber of Deputies. Following the formation of Lega per Salvini Premier and the 2019 federal congress of Lega Nord, after which the latter became practically inactive as Salvini turned the national regionalist party into a right-wing populist and Italian nationalist group, the Northern League Piedmont was re-established in February 2020 as Lega Piemonte per Salvini Premier in order to become the regional section of the new party. The founding members of the new Northern League Piedmont were Molinari, Alberto Gusmeroli, Alessandro Giglio Vigna, Andrea Giaccone, and Flavio Gastaldi. Molinari continued to led the party as commissioner. During a party congress in June 2023, Molinari, who had an increasing role at the party's federal level as floor leader in the Chamber of Deputies, was unanimously confirmed as party leader in Piedmont, becoming secretary.

== Popular support and election results ==
The party has its strongholds in the outer provinces, as well as in rural and in mountain areas of Piedmont. In the 2010 regional election it won 25.3% in Cuneo, 24.4% in Vercelli, 21.6% in Verbano-Cusio-Ossola, 21.1% in Novara, 20.6% in Asti, and 20.2% in Biella. In the 2018 general election, the party obtained 25–28% in the single-seat constituencies of southern Piedmont (Cuneo, Alba, Asti, and Alessandria) and those of northern Piedmont (Novara, Biella, and Verbania).

Electoral results of Lega Piemonte
1990 regional	1992 general	1994 general	1995 regional	1996 general	1999 European	2000 regional	2001 general	2004 European	2005 regional	2006 general	2008 general	2009 European	2010 regional
5.1	16.3	15.7	9.9	18.2	7.8	7.6	5.9	8.2	8.5	6.3	12.6	15.7	16.7

2013 general	2014 regional	2014 European	2018 general	2019 European	2019 regional	2022 general	2024 European
4.8	7.3	7.6	22.6	37.1	37.1	10.7	10.3

== Leadership ==
- Secretary: Gipo Farassino (1987–1997), Domenico Comino (1997–1999), Bernardino Bosio (1999–2001), Roberto Cota (2001–2016), Riccardo Molinari (2016–present, commissioner 2020–2023)
- President: Angelo Colli (1991–1992), Domenico Comino (1994–1997), Bernardino Bosio (1997–1999), Silvano Straneo (2000–2001), Oreste Rossi (2001–2004), Mario Borghezio (2004–2011), Gianna Gancia (2012–2016), Stefano Allasia (2016–2020)

== See also ==
- Lega Padana
- List of political parties in Italy
