= 2014 Piedmontese regional election =

Italian local election

2014 Piedmentese regional election
- 25 May 2014

All 51 seats to the Regional Council of Piedmont
- Turnout: 66.44% (▲2.11%)
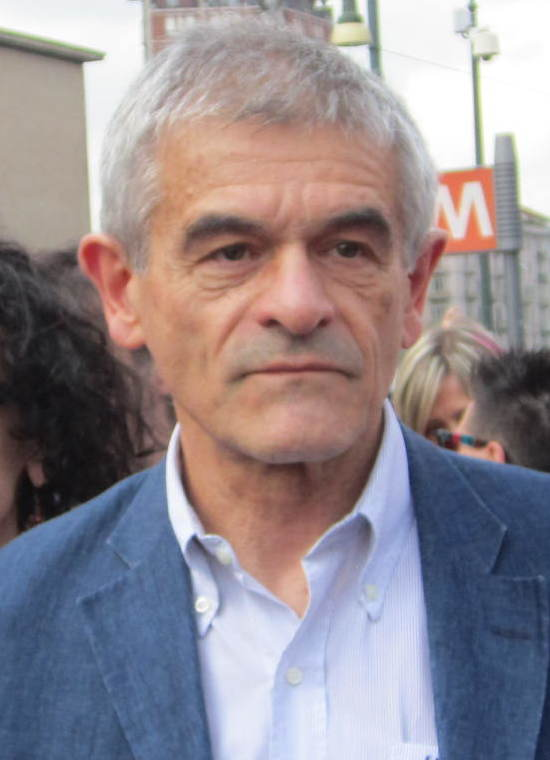

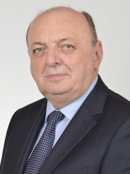

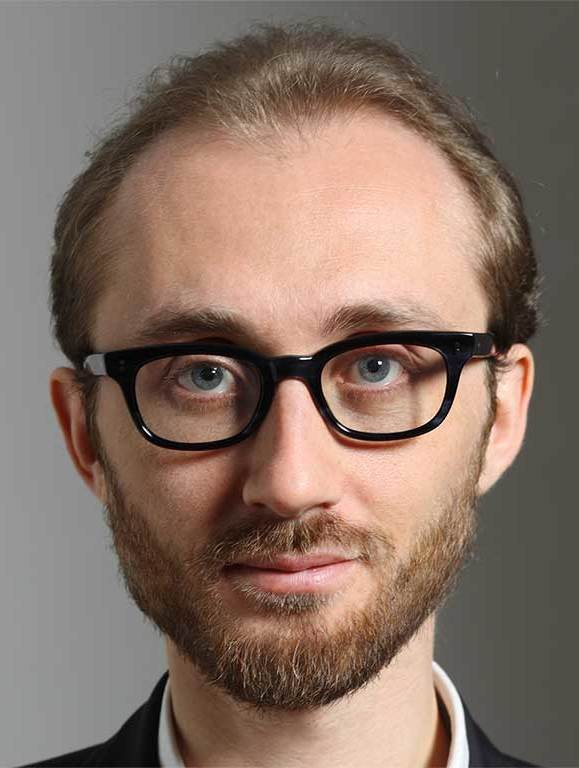
	Majority party	Minority party	Third party
Leader	Sergio Chiamparino	Gilberto Pichetto Fratin	Davide Bono
Party	Democratic Party	Forza Italia	Five Star Movement
Alliance	Centre-left	Centre-right
Last election	22 seats, 46.9%	36 seats, 47.3%	2 seats, 4.1%
Seats won	33	9	8
Seat change	▲11	▼27	▲6
Popular vote	1,057,031	495,993	481,453
Percentage	47.1%	22.1%	21.4%
Swing	▲0.2%	▼25.2%	▲17.3%
President before election
Roberto Cota
LN
President-elect
Sergio Chiamparino
PD

The 2014 Piedmontese regional election took place on 25 May 2014.

== Electoral system ==
Regional elections in Piedmont were ruled by the Tatarella law, which was approved in 1995 and provided for a mixed electoral system. Four fifths of the regional councilors were elected in provincial constituencies by proportional representation, using the largest remainder method with a Droop quota and open lists, while the residual votes and the unassigned seats were grouped into a single regional constituency, where the whole ratios and the highest remainders were divided with the Hare quota among the provincial party lists; one fifth of the council seats instead was reserved for regional lists and assigned with a majoritarian representation system, in which the leader of the regional list that scored the highest number of votes was elected to the presidency of the region, while the other candidates were elected regional councilors.

A threshold of 3% had been established for the provincial lists, which could still have entered the regional council if the regional list to which they were connected had scored at least 5% of valid votes. The panachage was also allowed; the voter can indicate a candidate for the presidency but prefer a provincial list connected to another candidate.

== Background ==
A snap election, it was prompted by the dissolution of the Regional Council of Piedmont by the Regional Administrative Tribunal on the grounds that one of the lists supporting Roberto Cota (Northern League) in the 2010 Piedmontese regional election in which Cota narrowly defeated Mercedes Bresso, the incumbent president for the Democratic Party (PD), had committed irregularities in filing the slates for the election.

In 2014, Cota chose not to stand again for president and the parties composing his coalition failed to agree on a single candidate, resulting in a landslide victory for Sergio Chiamparino, a member of the PD who had been mayor of Turin from 2001 to 2011.

== Parties and candidates ==
Political party or alliance	Constituent lists	Previous result		Candidate
Political party or alliance	Constituent lists	Votes (%)	Seats	Candidate
Centre-right coalition	Forza Italia	25.0	13	Gilberto Pichetto Fratin
Centre-right coalition	Northern League Piedmont	16.7	9	Gilberto Pichetto Fratin
Centre-right coalition	Greens Greens	1.8	1	Gilberto Pichetto Fratin
Centre-right coalition	Pensioners' Party	1.5	1	Gilberto Pichetto Fratin
Centre-right coalition	United Right (incl. LD, FLI, DS)	0.7	–	Gilberto Pichetto Fratin
Centre-right coalition	Civic List for Piedmont	—N/a	—N/a	Gilberto Pichetto Fratin
Centre-right coalition	Great South	—N/a	—N/a	Gilberto Pichetto Fratin
Centre-left coalition	Democratic Party	23.2	12	Sergio Chiamparino
Centre-left coalition	Italy of Values	6.9	3	Sergio Chiamparino
Centre-left coalition	Moderates	3.1	1	Sergio Chiamparino
Centre-left coalition	Left Ecology Freedom	1.4	1	Sergio Chiamparino
Centre-left coalition	Chiamparino for President	—N/a	—N/a	Sergio Chiamparino
Centre-left coalition	Civic Choice	—N/a	—N/a	Sergio Chiamparino
Five Star Movement		3.7	2	Davide Bono
Brothers of Italy		—N/a	—N/a	Guido Crosetto
New Centre-Right – Union of the Centre		—N/a	—N/a	Enrico Costa
The Other Piedmont to the Left (incl. PRC, SA, AC)		—N/a	—N/a	Mauro Filingeri

== Results ==
25 May 2014 Piedmontese regional election results
Candidates	Votes	%	Seats	Parties	Votes	%	Seats
Sergio Chiamparino	1,057,031	47.09	11				
Sergio Chiamparino	1,057,031	47.09	11	Democratic Party	704,541	36.17	17
Sergio Chiamparino	1,057,031	47.09	11	Chiamparino for President	94,615	4.85	2
Sergio Chiamparino	1,057,031	47.09	11	Moderates	47,901	2.45	1
Sergio Chiamparino	1,057,031	47.09	11	Left Ecology Freedom	40,873	2.09	1
Sergio Chiamparino	1,057,031	47.09	11	Civic Choice	29,313	1.50	1
Sergio Chiamparino	1,057,031	47.09	11	Italy of Values	13,658	0.70	–
Sergio Chiamparino	1,057,031	47.09	11	Total	930,901	47.79	22
Gilberto Pichetto; Fratin	495,993	22.09	1				
Gilberto Pichetto; Fratin	495,993	22.09	1	Forza Italia	302,743	15.57	6
Gilberto Pichetto; Fratin	495,993	22.09	1	Northern League Piedmont	141,741	7.27	2
Gilberto Pichetto; Fratin	495,993	22.09	1	Pensioners' Party	13,837	0.71	–
Gilberto Pichetto; Fratin	495,993	22.09	1	Civic List for Piedmont	8,853	0.45	–
Gilberto Pichetto; Fratin	495,993	22.09	1	Greens Greens	5,435	0.27	–
Gilberto Pichetto; Fratin	495,993	22.09	1	United Right	5,004	0.25	–
Gilberto Pichetto; Fratin	495,993	22.09	1	Great South	1,676	0.08	–
Gilberto Pichetto; Fratin	495,993	22.09	1	Total	479,289	24.61	8
Davide Bono	481,453	21.45	–	Five Star Movement	396,295	20.34	8
Guido Crosetto	117,807	5.24	–	Brothers of Italy	72,776	3.73	1
Enrico Costa	67,025	2.98	–	New Centre-Right – Union of the Centre	49,059	2.51	–
Mauro Filingeri	25,193	1.12	–	The Other Piedmont to the Left	19,467	0.99	–
Total candidates	2,244,502	100.00	12	Total parties	1,947,787	100.00	39
Source: Ministry of the Interior – Historical Archive of Elections
