= Moderates (Italy) =

Moderates Moderati
- Secretary: Giacomo Portas
- Founded: 20 December 2005
- Headquarters: Via XX Settembre, 9; 10121 Turin
- Ideology: Liberalism
- Political position: Centre
- National affiliation: Democratic Party (2008–2019); Italia Viva (2019–2022)
- Chamber of Deputies: 0 / 400
- Senate: 0 / 200
- European Parliament: 0 / 76
- Regional Councils: 1 / 896

Website
- http://www.moderati.eu/index.html

The Moderates (Italian: Moderati) are a centrist political party in Italy, active mainly in Piedmont, but also in Lombardy, Emilia-Romagna, Campania and Sicily. The party, whose leader is Giacomo Portas, is associated with the centrist party Italia Viva.

== History ==
The party was launched in January 2006 by Portas, a former member of Forza Italia (FI), and was joined by four regional councillors: Giuliano Manolino (ex-FI), Giovanni Pizzale (ex-IdV), Mauro Laus (ex-DS) and Graziella Valloggia (ex-PRC).

In the 2006 municipal election in Turin the party scored 4.0%, in 2007 it won 3.0% in Cuneo, 7.8% in Grugliasco and 10.0% in Moncalieri, in 2008 it scored 5.6% in Ivrea and 5.9% in Orbassano.

In the 2008 general election Portas was elected to the Chamber of Deputies as an independent from the list of the Democratic Party in the "Piedmont 1" constituency, marking the party's entry in national politics.

In 2009 provincial elections the party won 2.7% in the Province of Turin, 2.1% in Alessandria, 1.7% in Cuneo and 0.8% in Novara, and in that year municipal elections it obtained 10.4% in Nichelino and 6.7% in Piossasco.

In the 2010 regional election the Moderates won 3.1% of the vote regionally and 4.1% in the Province of Turin, where Michele Dell'Utri was elected regional councillor. After the election, Giovanni Maria Ferraris was appointed regional minister.

In the 2011 Turin municipal election the party garnered a sweeping 9.1% and four councillors, being crucial for the election of Democrat Piero Fassino as mayor.

In the 2012 municipal elections the party won 6.5% in Alessandria, 4.6% in Asti, 6.8% in Cuneo, and 11.9% in Grugliasco. Lists with a similar name and symbol appeared also outside Piedmont, most notably in Piacenza, where "Moderates for Dosi" won 13.4% of the vote.

The party contested the 2013 general election as part of the PD-led centre-left coalition Italy. Common Good and Portas was re-elected to the Chamber.

In the 2014 regional election the party obtained 2.5% of the vote and two councillors.

In 2015 Michelino Davico, a senator from Cuneo elected with Lega Nord, joined the party, which was thus represented in both houses of the Italian Parliament.

In 2016 the party formed a federative pact with Civic Choice (SC) and sub-group within the Mixed Group of the Chamber of Deputies with three deputies (Marco Di Lello, S&D–PD; Lello Di Gioia, S&D–PD; Aniello Formisano, IdV), but not its leader Portars, who remained in the group of the PD. In the 2016 local elections the Moderates won 5.9% in Turin, 10.0% in Pinerolo and 4.8% in Nichelino, and, outside Piedmont, no remarkable results (including a mere 0.9% in Naples).

In the 2017 local elections the party obtained 3.8% in Alessandria, 4.6% in Cuneo, and 7.4% in Chivasso.

The Moderates contested the 2018 general election as part of the centre-left coalition and Portas was elected in the PD list.

In 2019 the Moderates ended their association with the Democratic Party and affiliated to Italia Viva, the new centrist party founded by former Prime Minister Matteo Renzi. Portas also left the PD group in the Chamber of Deputies and joined the IV group.

The party competed in the 2020 Campania regional election in support of the candidate Vincenzo De Luca, getting 3.6% of the vote and 2 seats.

The party originally planned to contest the 2022 general election as a component of the Democratic Party – Democratic and Progressive Italy list.

== Election results ==
=== Italian Parliament ===
Election	Leader	Chamber of Deputies				Senate of the Republic			
Election	Leader	Votes	%	Seats	+/–	Votes	%	Seats	+/–
2008	Giacomo Portas	Into PD		1 / 630	New	Did not compete			
2013	Giacomo Portas	Into PD		1 / 630	0	14,512	0.05	0 / 315	New
2018	Giacomo Portas	Into PD		1 / 630	0	Did not compete			

=== Regional elections ===
Region	Election	Candidate	Votes	%	Seats	+/–
Piedmont	2010	Mercedes Bresso	58,010	3.06	1 / 60	New
Piedmont	2014	Sergio Chiamparino	47,901	2.45	1 / 51	0
Piedmont	2019	Sergio Chiamparino	36,125	1.88	1 / 51	0
Piedmont	2024	Alberto Cirio	Into Cirio for President		1 / 51	0
Campania	2020	Vincenzo De Luca	84,769 (Note: In a joint list with Liberal Democrats.)	3.60	2 / 51	New
