= 2024 Piedmontese regional election =

- 8–9 June 2024

All 49 seats to the Regional Council of Piedmont
- Turnout: 55.30%
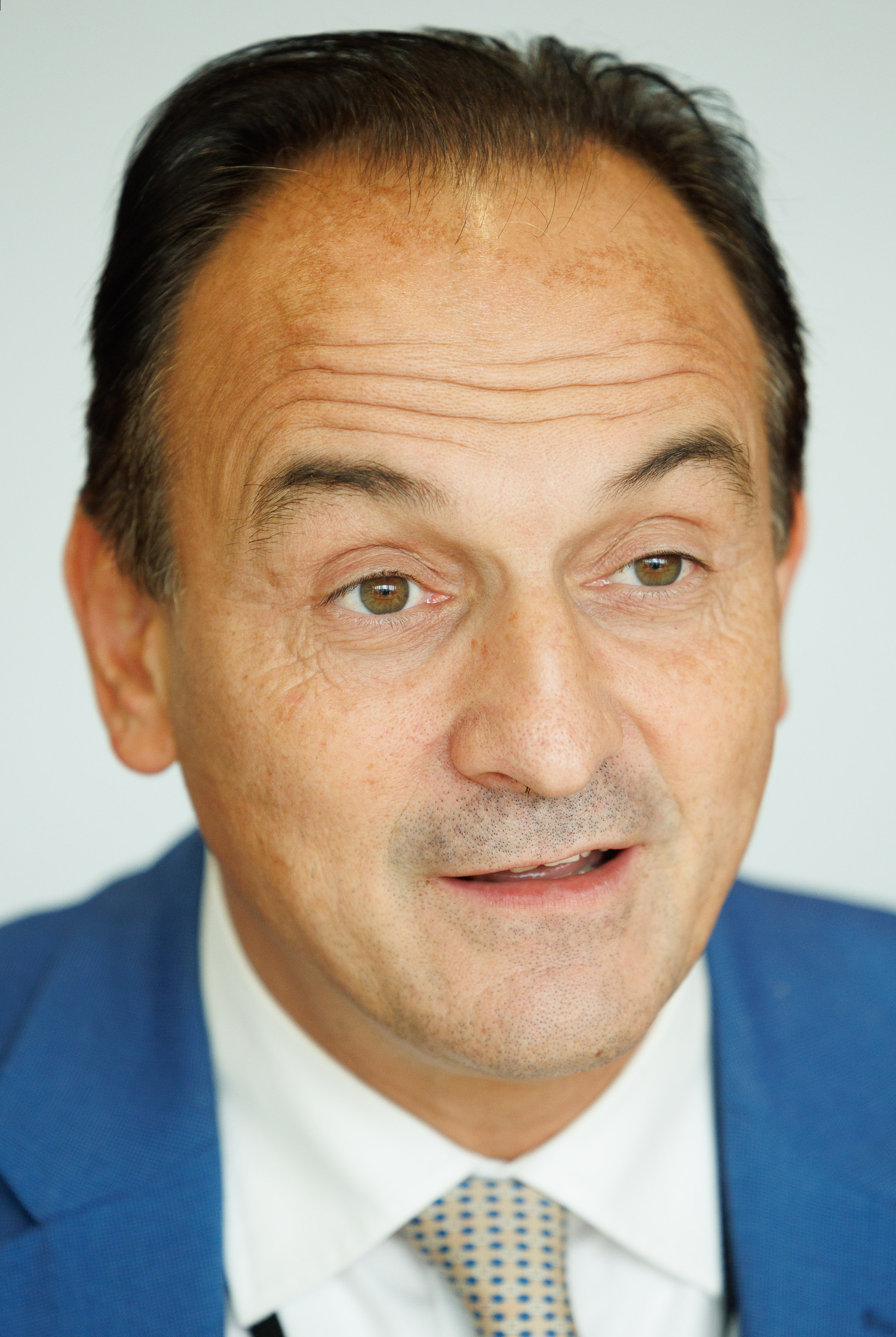

	Majority party	Minority party
Candidate	Alberto Cirio	Gianna Pentenero
Party	Forza Italia	Democratic Party
Alliance	Centre-right	Centre-left
Seats won	30	16
Seat change	▼3	▲3
Popular vote	1,055,753	630,853
Percentage	56.13%	33.54%
Swing	▲6.22%	▼2.26%
President before election
Alberto Cirio
FI
Elected President
Alberto Cirio
FI

The 2024 Piedmontese regional election was held on 8–9 June 2024. The election will elect all members of the Regional Council of Piedmont, as well as the president of Piedmont. It is the fourth election as part of the 2024 Italian regional elections and was held on the same day as the 2024 European Parliament election in Italy.

== Background ==
In the 2019 Piedmontese regional election, the centre-right coalition regained control of the region after its candidate, Alberto Cirio of Forza Italia, defeated the centre-left coalition's incumbent president Sergio Chiamparino of the Democratic Party. In a summer 2023 approval rankings drawn up by Il Sole 24 Ore about Italy's regional presidents, Cirio ranked sixth. In January 2024, the Regional Council of Piedmont approved the decree that dated the Piedmontese election to 9 June 2024. The election in Piedmont is one of the five regional elections in Italy for 2024 and will be held on the same day as the 2024 European Parliament election. The rise of Brothers of Italy, which culminated in the party leading the centre-right coalition and the formation of the Meloni government after the 2022 Italian general election, caused division within the centre-right coalition going into the 2024 Sardinian regional election, where Brothers of Italy obtained their candidate. This put in question the re-election bids of other centre-right coalition's regional presidents, including in Piedmont. In March 2024, Cirio was confirmed as the centre-right coalition candidate.

Among the national and regional opposition, the Democratic Party and the Five Star Movement were divided over the Piedmontese candidate. In the region, both parties had been historically divided, in particular over the issue of the Treno Alta Velocità. In February 2024, the centre-left coalition narrowly won in Sardinia, unseating a centre-right coalition regional incumbent president since 2015, despite a left-leaning independent candidacy, and although it ultimately lost, it was united in the subsequent 2024 Abruzzo regional election. Division within the centre-left coalition ahead of the 2024 Basilicata regional election caused further division for the Piedmontese one. In Basilicata, Domenico Lacerenza, the Five Star Movement's preferred candidate in Basilicata, was forced to withdraw his candidacy, and although the Five Star Movement ultimately reached an agreement with the centre-left coalition, Action and Italia Viva had joined the centre-right coalition, a situation that could repeat itself in Piedmont; Action leader Carlo Calenda said that no decision was made on whether to support Cirio. Additionally, when the Democratic Party, the largest party within the centre-left coalition, announced Gianna Pentenero as their candidate in Piedmont, rather than the rumoured candidacy of Chiara Gribaudo, a deputy from the Democratic Party who alongside Daniele Valle (a member of the Democratic Party and the minority vice-president in the Regional Council of Piedmont) accepted the decision, the Five Star Movement stated that they would not support her, and announced they would field their own candidate. A possible candidate is Chiara Appendino, the Five Star Movement's former mayor of Turin, although they denied it both as part of the centre-left coalition and as their own separate candidate.

== Electoral system ==
In July 2023, the Regional Council of Piedmont approved a new electoral law.

== Political parties and candidates ==
Political party or alliance	Constituent lists	Previous result		Candidate
Political party or alliance	Constituent lists	Votes (%)	Seats	Candidate
Centre-right coalition	League (Lega)	37.1	17	Alberto Cirio
Centre-right coalition	Forza Italia – UDC – PLI (FI–UDC–PLI)	9.2	4	Alberto Cirio
Centre-right coalition	Brothers of Italy (FdI)	5.5	2	Alberto Cirio
Centre-right coalition	Cirio for President (incl. Moderates and Action)	—N/a	—N/a	Alberto Cirio
Centre-right coalition	Us Moderates (NM)	—N/a	—N/a	Alberto Cirio
Centre-left coalition	Democratic Party (PD)	22.4	9	Gianna Pentenero
Centre-left coalition	Greens and Left Alliance (AVS)	2.4	1	Gianna Pentenero
Centre-left coalition	United States of Europe (SUE)	1.8	—N/a	Gianna Pentenero
Centre-left coalition	Environmentalist and Solidary Piedmont (incl. DemoS and Volt)	0.8	—N/a	Gianna Pentenero
Centre-left coalition	Pentenero for President	—N/a	—N/a	Gianna Pentenero
Five Star Movement (M5S)		13.6	5	Sarah Disabato
Popular Piedmont (PP)		—N/a	—N/a	Francesca Frediani
Freedom (L)		—N/a	—N/a	Alberto Costanzo

== Opinion polling ==
Date	Polling firm	Sample size	Cirio	Pentenero	Disabato	Frediani	Costanzo	Others	Lead
22 May 2024	Noto	1,000	58.0	27.0	11.0	4.0			31.0
14-16 May 2024	BiDiMedia	1,000	54.7	33.0	8.5	2.3	1.5	—N/a	21.7
20-24 Apr 2024	BiDiMedia	1,000	56.0	34.1	8.8	—N/a		1.1	21.9

Date	Polling firm	Sample size	Centre-right					Centre-left					M5S	UP	Libertà	Others	Lead
Date	Polling firm	Sample size	FdI	Lega	FI	CP	NM	PD	SUE	AVS	PP	AeS	M5S	UP	Libertà	Others	Lead
22 May 2024	Noto	1,000	28.0	11.0	8.0	8.0	3.0	15.0	3.0	4.0	4.0	1.0	11.0	2.0	2.0	—N/a	13.0
14–16 May 2024	BiDiMedia	1,000	27.1	12.0	9.2	5.2	1.1	21.0	5.1	3.9	1.7	1.0	8.3	2.3	1.5	—N/a	6.1
20-24 Apr 2024	BiDiMedia	1,000	27.0	12.1	9.9	5.8	1.0	21.6	5.8	4.5	2.5	1.0	8.6	—N/a		1.7	5.4

== Results ==
8–9 June 2024 Piedmontese regional election results
Candidates	Votes	%	Seats	Parties	Votes	%	Seats
Alberto Cirio	1,055,752	56.13	6	Brothers of Italy	403,954	24.43	11
Alberto Cirio	1,055,752	56.13	6	Cirio for President	202,294	12.23	5
Alberto Cirio	1,055,752	56.13	6	Forza Italia	162,888	9.85	4
Alberto Cirio	1,055,752	56.13	6	League	155,522	9.40	4
Alberto Cirio	1,055,752	56.13	6	Us Moderates	11,441	0.69	–
Alberto Cirio	1,055,752	56.13	6	Total	936,098	56.60	24
Gianna Pentenero	630,853	33.54	1	Democratic Party	395.710	23.93	12
Gianna Pentenero	630,853	33.54	1	Greens and Left Alliance	107,095	6.48	3
Gianna Pentenero	630,853	33.54	1	United States of Europe	40,223	2.43	1
Gianna Pentenero	630,853	33.54	1	Pentenero for President	24,835	1.5	–
Gianna Pentenero	630,853	33.54	1	Environmentalist and Solidary Piedmont	14,536	0.88	–
Gianna Pentenero	630,853	33.54	1	Total	582,399	35.22	16
Sarah Disabato	144,420	7.68	–	Five Star Movement	99,806	6.04	3
Francesca Frediani	28,191	1.50	–	Popular Piedmont	19,377	1.17	–
Alberto Costanzo	21,565	1.15	–	Freedom	16,064	0.97	–
Total candidates	1,880,781	100.00	6	Total parties	1,653,744	100.00	43
Blank and invalid votes	170,048	8.49					
Registered voters/turnout	3,621,101	55.30					
Source: Ministry of the Interior – Election in Piedmont

=== Results by province and capital city ===
Province	Gianna Pentenero	Alberto Cirio	Sarah Disabato	Others
Turin	373,125 39.09%	468,302 49.06%	86,780 9.09%	26,312 2.76%
Cuneo	73,166 26.58%	183,302 66.58%	12,474 4.53%	6,357 2.31%
Alessandria	50,577 28.44%	109,520 61.61%	13,073 7.35%	4,626 2.60%
Novara	46,502 29.09%	97,473 60.98%	11,778 7.37%	4,099 2.56%
Asti	24,455 26.97%	57,695 63.63%	6,400 7.06%	2,121 2.34%
Biella	22,958 28.24%	50,977 62.72%	4,903 6.03%	2,445 3.01%
Vercelli	19,241 26.46%	47,062 64.72%	4,584 6.30%	1,834 2.53%
Verbano-Cusio-Ossola	20,849 30.37%	41,421 60.33%	4,428 6.45%	1,962 2.85%

City	Gianna Pentenero	Alberto Cirio	Sarah Disabato	Others
Turin	155,641 46.45%	140,345 41.88%	30,355 9.06%	8,759 2.62%
Cuneo	10,170 42.65%	11,608 48.67%	1,333 5.59%	737 3.09%
Alessandria	10,392 31.88%	18,620 57.13%	2,759 8.46%	823 2.52%
Novara	14,306 35.98%	21,452 53.95%	3,189 8.02%	817 2.05%
Asti	9,438 34.89%	14,657 54.19%	2,413 8.92%	541 2.00%
Biella	6,589 33.47%	11,425 58.03%	1,180 5.99%	495 2.51%
Vercelli	6,355 32.02%	11,832 59.62%	1,209 6.09%	451 2.27%
Verbania	5,434 38.66%	7,155 50.91%	944 6.72%	522 3.72%

== See also ==
- Politics of Piedmont
