= 2000 Piedmontese regional election =

Italian local election

2000 Piedmentese regional election
- 16 April 2000

All 60 seats to the Regional Council of Piedmont
- Turnout: 71.96% (▼11.02%)
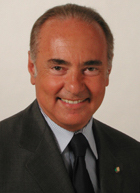

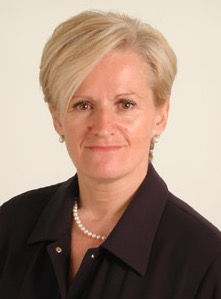
| | Majority party | Minority party |
|---|---|---|
| Leader | Enzo Ghigo | Livia Turco |
| Party | Forza Italia | DS |
| Alliance | Pole for Freedoms | The Olive Tree |
| Last election | 33 seats, 39.7% | 18 seats, 35.2% |
| Seats won | 40 | 18 |
| Seat change | ▲7 | Steady |
| Popular vote | 1,249,840 | 953,163 |
| Percentage | 51.8% | 39.5% |
| Swing | ▲1.0% | ▲3.7% |
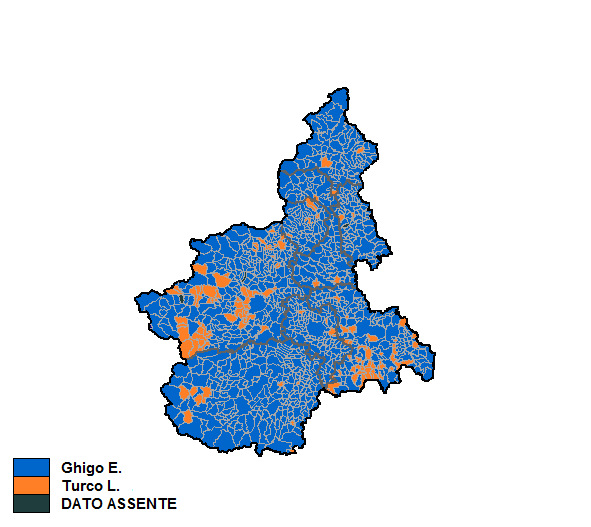
President before election
Enzo Ghigo
FI
President-elect
Enzo Ghigo
FI

The 2000 Piedmontese regional election took place on 16 April 2000. Enzo Ghigo of Forza Italia (FI) was re-elected for the second time in a row as the president of Piedmont, defeating Livia Turco of the Democrats of the Left (DS). His re-election resulted in a landslide, as this time he was also supported by Lega Nord (Northern League).

FI was confirmed as the largest party in the region with an historic 30.8% of the vote, while the DS were the second largest party with 17.7%. Piedmont was confirmed as a stronghold of Bonino List, whose leader Emma Bonino was candidate for president and took 5.7% of the vote.

== Electoral system ==
Regional elections in Piedmont were ruled by the Tatarella law, which was approved in 1995 and provided for a mixed electoral system. Four fifths of the regional councilors were elected in provincial constituencies by proportional representation, using the largest remainder method with a Droop quota and open lists, while the residual votes and the unassigned seats were grouped into a single regional constituency, where the whole ratios and the highest remainders were divided with the Hare quota among the provincial party lists; one fifth of the council seats instead was reserved for regional lists and assigned with a majoritarian representation system, in which the leader of the regional list that scored the highest number of votes was elected to the presidency of the region, while the other candidates were elected regional councilors.

A threshold of 3% had been established for the provincial lists, which could still have entered the regional council if the regional list to which they were connected had scored at least 5% of valid votes. The panachage was also allowed; the voter can indicate a candidate for the presidency but prefer a provincial list connected to another candidate.

== Parties and candidates ==
| Political party or alliance | Constituent lists | Previous result | | Candidate |
| Political party or alliance | Constituent lists | Votes (%) | Seats | Candidate |
|---|---|---|---|---|
| The Olive Tree | Democrats of the Left | 21.7 | 11 | Livia Turco |
| The Olive Tree | Communist Refoundation Party | 9.3 | 4 | Livia Turco |
| The Olive Tree | Italian People's Party – UDEUR – Italian Renewal | 6.2 | 3 | Livia Turco |
| The Olive Tree | Federation of the Greens | 2.7 | 1 | Livia Turco |
| The Olive Tree | Pensioners' Party | 1.6 | 1 | Livia Turco |
| The Olive Tree | The Democrats | —N/a | —N/a | Livia Turco |
| The Olive Tree | Party of Italian Communists | —N/a | —N/a | Livia Turco |
| The Olive Tree | Italian Democratic Socialists | —N/a | —N/a | Livia Turco |
| Pole for Freedoms | Forza Italia | 26.7 | 14 | Enzo Ghigo |
| Pole for Freedoms | National Alliance | 11.2 | 6 | Enzo Ghigo |
| Pole for Freedoms | Northern League Piedmont | 9.9 | 5 | Enzo Ghigo |
| Pole for Freedoms | Christian Democratic Centre | 3.0 | 1 | Enzo Ghigo |
| Pole for Freedoms | United Christian Democrats | —N/a | —N/a | Enzo Ghigo |
| Pole for Freedoms | Others | —N/a | —N/a | Enzo Ghigo |
| Bonino List | | 1.6 | – | Emma Bonino |

== Results ==
16 April 2000 Piedmontese regional election results
| Candidates | Votes | % | Seats | Parties | Votes | % | Seats |
|---|---|---|---|---|---|---|---|
| Enzo Ghigo | 1,249,840 | 51.78 | 12 | | | | |
| Enzo Ghigo | 1,249,840 | 51.78 | 12 | Forza Italia | 626,907 | 30.78 | 17 |
| Enzo Ghigo | 1,249,840 | 51.78 | 12 | National Alliance | 241,864 | 11.88 | 6 |
| Enzo Ghigo | 1,249,840 | 51.78 | 12 | Northern League Piedmont | 153,935 | 7.56 | 3 |
| Enzo Ghigo | 1,249,840 | 51.78 | 12 | United Christian Democrats | 48,707 | 2.39 | 1 |
| Enzo Ghigo | 1,249,840 | 51.78 | 12 | Christian Democratic Centre | 43,827 | 2.15 | 1 |
| Enzo Ghigo | 1,249,840 | 51.78 | 12 | Socialist Party | 16,283 | 0.80 | – |
| Enzo Ghigo | 1,249,840 | 51.78 | 12 | The Liberals Sgarbi | 5,725 | 0.28 | – |
| Enzo Ghigo | 1,249,840 | 51.78 | 12 | Christian Democratic Party | 2,139 | 0.11 | – |
| Enzo Ghigo | 1,249,840 | 51.78 | 12 | Total | 1,139,387 | 55.95 | 28 |
| Livia Turco | 953,163 | 39.49 | 1 | | | | |
| Livia Turco | 953,163 | 39.49 | 1 | Democrats of the Left | 360,826 | 17.72 | 9 |
| Livia Turco | 953,163 | 39.49 | 1 | Communist Refoundation Party | 112,489 | 5.52 | 2 |
| Livia Turco | 953,163 | 39.49 | 1 | The Democrats | 86,349 | 4.24 | 2 |
| Livia Turco | 953,163 | 39.49 | 1 | Italian People's Party–UDEUR–Italian Renewal | 74,888 | 3.68 | 1 |
| Livia Turco | 953,163 | 39.49 | 1 | Party of Italian Communists | 41,930 | 2.06 | 1 |
| Livia Turco | 953,163 | 39.49 | 1 | Federation of the Greens | 41,853 | 2.06 | 1 |
| Livia Turco | 953,163 | 39.49 | 1 | Italian Democratic Socialists | 36,788 | 1.81 | 1 |
| Livia Turco | 953,163 | 39.49 | 1 | Pensioners' Party | 15,964 | 0.78 | – |
| Livia Turco | 953,163 | 39.49 | 1 | Total | 771,087 | 37.87 | 17 |
| Emma Bonino | 138,632 | 5.74 | – | Bonino List | 90,796 | 4.46 | 2 |
| Alessandra Calvo | 62,288 | 2.58 | – | | | | |
| Alessandra Calvo | 62,288 | 2.58 | – | Autonomists for Europe | 26,639 | 1.31 | – |
| Alessandra Calvo | 62,288 | 2.58 | – | Greens Greens | 8,498 | 0.42 | – |
| Alessandra Calvo | 62,288 | 2.58 | – | Total | 35,137 | 1.73 | – |
| Antonio Tevere | 9,624 | 0.40 | – | Humanist Party | – | – | – |
| Total candidates | 2,413,547 | 100.00 | 13 | Total parties | 2,036,407 | 100.00 | 47 |
Source: Ministry of the Interior – Historical Archive of Elections
