= List of presidents of Piedmont =

The president of Piedmont is the head of the government of the region. The presidents elected between 1970 and 1995 were elected by the Regional Council of Piedmont. Later they were directly elected by the population.

This is the list of presidents of Piedmont since 1970.

President		Term of office		Party	Coalition	Administration	Legislature
Presidents elected by the Regional Council of Piedmont (1970–1995)
1	Edoardo Calleri di Sala (1927–2002)	23 July 1970	21 December 1973	DC	DC • PSI • PSDI • PRI	Calleri di Sala	I (1970)
2	Gianni Oberto Tarena (1902–1980)	21 December 1973	21 July 1975	DC	DC • PSI • PSDI • PRI	Tarena	I (1970)
3	Aldo Viglione (1923–1988)	21 July 1975	28 July 1980	PSI	PSI • PCI	Vigilone I	II (1975)
4	Ezio Enrietti (1936–2020)	28 July 1980	15 July 1983	PSI	PSI • PCI	Enrietti	III (1980)
3	Aldo Viglione (1923–1988)	15 July 1983	1 August 1985	PSI	DC • PSI • PSDI • PRI • PLI	Vigilone II	III (1980)
5	Vittorio Beltrami (1926–2012)	1 August 1985	25 July 1990	DC	DC • PSI • PSDI • PRI • PLI	Beltrami	IV (1985)
6	Gian Paolo Brizio (1929–2008)	25 July 1990	16 March 1993	DC	DC • PSI • PSDI • PRI • PLI	Brizio I	V (1990)
6	Gian Paolo Brizio (1929–2008)	16 March 1993	12 June 1995	DC	DC • PSI • FdV • PDS • RI	Brizio II	V (1990)
Directly-elected presidents (since 1995)
7	Enzo Ghigo (b. 1953)	12 June 1995	17 April 2000	FI	FI • AN • CCD	Ghigo I	VI (1995)
7	Enzo Ghigo (b. 1953)	17 April 2000	27 April 2005	FI	FI • AN • LN • CCD	Ghigo II	VII (2000)
8	Mercedes Bresso (b. 1944)	27 April 2005	9 April 2010	DS; PD	DS • DL • PRC • FdV	Bresso	VIII (2005)
9	Roberto Cota (b. 1968)	9 April 2010	9 June 2014 (Note: Election invalidated for irregularities.)	LN	PdL • LN	Cota	IX (2010)
10	Sergio Chiamparino (b. 1948)	9 June 2014	6 June 2019	PD	PD • SEL	Chiamparino	X (2014)
11	Alberto Cirio (b. 1972)	6 June 2019	21 June 2024	FI	LN • FI • FdI	Cirio I	XI (2019)
11	Alberto Cirio (b. 1972)	21 June 2024	In office	FI	FdI • FI • LN	Cirio II	XII (2024)
