= Giuseppe Cerutti (born 1938) =

Italian politician (born 1938)

Member of the Chamber of Deputies
- In office 1987–1994
- Constituency: Piedmont

Member of the Regional Council of Piedmont
- In office 14 July 1980 – 8 May 1987

Regional assessor for Roads and Transport of Piedmont
- In office 1 December 1980 – 5 May 1987
- President: Ezio Enrietti (1980–83); Aldo Viglione (1983–85); Vittorio Beltrami (1985–87)

Personal details
- Born: 6 February 1938 (age 88) Borgomanero, Province of Novara, Kingdom of Italy
- Party: PSDI (until 1989); PSI (1989–1994)
- Profession: Architect

Giuseppe Cerutti (born 6 February 1938) is an Italian politician and architect. He served as a member of the Chamber of Deputies from 1987 to 1994, representing the Italian Democratic Socialist Party and later the Italian Socialist Party. Previously mayor of Borgomanero, he also served as a member of the Regional Council of Piedmont and regional assessor from 1980 to 1987.
