= Pichetto =

Pichetto is an Italian surname. Notable people with the surname include:

- Gilberto Pichetto Fratin (born 1954), Italian politician
- Miguel Ángel Pichetto (born 1950), Argentine lawyer and politician
