= 1995 Piedmontese regional election =

Italian local election

1995 Piedmentese regional election
- 23 April 1995

All 60 seats to the Regional Council of Piedmont
- Turnout: 82.98% (▼5.99%)
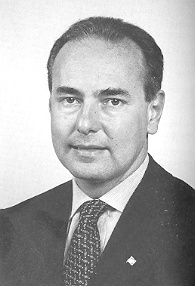

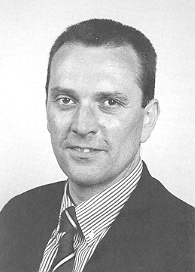
	Majority party	Minority party	Third party
Leader	Enzo Ghigo	Giuseppe Pichetto	Domenico Comino
Party	Forza Italia	Independent	Northern League
Alliance	Centre-right	Centre-left
Seats won	33	18	5
Popular vote	1,059,602	938,280	296,966
Percentage	39.7%	35.2%	11.1%
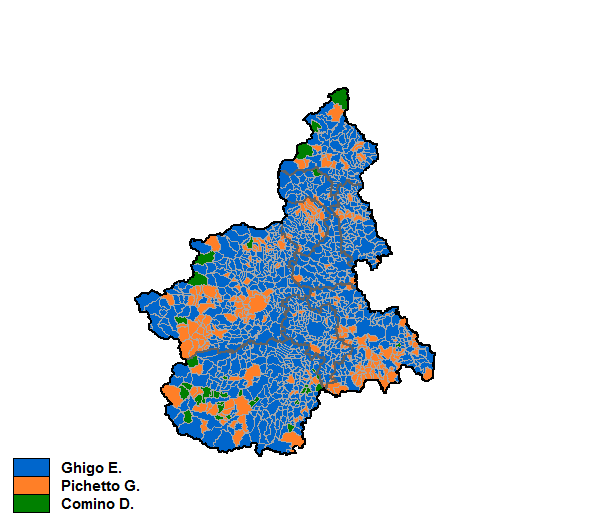
President before election
Gian Paolo Brizio
PPI
President-elect
Enzo Ghigo
FI

The 1995 Piedmontese regional election took place on 23 April 1995. For the first time, the president of Piedmont was directly elected by the people; the election was not yet binding and the president-elect could have been replaced during the term.

In an upset, Enzo Ghigo of Forza Italia (FI) was elected president of the region, defeating Giuseppe Pichetto, an independent politician running for the country's centre-left coalition, and Domenico Comino of the Lega Nord (Northern League) regional branch Lega Nord Piemont (Northern League Piedmont). FI, which was founded the year before by Silvio Berlusconi, formed the People's Pole joint list and became the largest party in the region with 26.7% of the vote, while the Democrats of the Left came second with 21.7%.

== Electoral system ==
Regional elections in Piedmont were ruled by the Tatarella law, which was approved in 1995 and provided for a mixed electoral system. Four fifths of the regional councilors were elected in provincial constituencies by proportional representation, using the largest remainder method with a Droop quota and open lists, while the residual votes and the unassigned seats were grouped into a single regional constituency, where the whole ratios and the highest remainders were divided with the Hare quota among the provincial party lists; one fifth of the council seats instead was reserved for regional lists and assigned with a majoritarian representation system, in which the leader of the regional list that scored the highest number of votes was elected to the presidency of the region, while the other candidates were elected regional councilors.

A threshold of 3% had been established for the provincial lists, which could still have entered the regional council if the regional list to which they were connected had scored at least 5% of valid votes. The panachage was also allowed; the voter can indicate a candidate for the presidency but prefer a provincial list connected to another candidate.

== Parties and candidates ==
Political party or alliance	Constituent lists	Previous result		Candidate
Political party or alliance	Constituent lists	Votes (%)	Seats	Candidate
Centre-left coalition	Italian People's Party	27.9	18	Giuseppe Pichetto
Centre-left coalition	Democratic Party of the Left	22.8	14	Giuseppe Pichetto
Centre-left coalition	Federation of the Greens	6.7	4	Giuseppe Pichetto
Centre-left coalition	Pensioners' Party	1.4	1	Giuseppe Pichetto
Centre-left coalition	Pact of Democrats	—N/a	—N/a	Giuseppe Pichetto
Northern League Piedmont		5.1	3	Domenico Comino
Centre-right coalition	National Alliance	3.6	2	Enzo Ghigo
Centre-right coalition	Forza Italia	—N/a	—N/a	Enzo Ghigo
Centre-right coalition	Christian Democratic Centre	—N/a	—N/a	Enzo Ghigo
Pannella List		1.2	1	Carmelo Palma
Communist Refoundation Party		—N/a	—N/a	Giovanni Alasia

== Results ==
23 April 1995 Piedmontese regional election results
Candidates	Votes	%	Seats	Parties	Votes	%	Seats
Enzo Ghigo	1,059,602	39.70	12				
Enzo Ghigo	1,059,602	39.70	12	Forza Italia – The People's Pole	588,171	26.71	14
Enzo Ghigo	1,059,602	39.70	12	National Alliance	247,103	11.22	6
Enzo Ghigo	1,059,602	39.70	12	Christian Democratic Centre	65,099	2.96	1
Enzo Ghigo	1,059,602	39.70	12	Total	900,373	40.88	21
Giuseppe Pichetto	938,280	35.16	–				
Giuseppe Pichetto	938,280	35.16	–	Democratic Party of the Left	478,615	21.73	11
Giuseppe Pichetto	938,280	35.16	–	Italian People's Party	136,664	6.21	3
Giuseppe Pichetto	938,280	35.16	–	Pact of Democrats	76,592	3.48	2
Giuseppe Pichetto	938,280	35.16	–	Federation of the Greens	59,238	2.69	1
Giuseppe Pichetto	938,280	35.16	–	Pensioners' Party	35,162	1.60	1
Giuseppe Pichetto	938,280	35.16	–	Populars and Democrats	8,507	0.39	–
Giuseppe Pichetto	938,280	35.16	–	Total	794,778	36.09	18
Domenico Comino	296,966	11.13	–	Northern League Piedmont	217,194	9.86	5
Giovanni Alasia	248,158	9.30	–	Communist Refoundation Party	203,842	9.26	4
Carmelo Palma	54,436	2.04	–				
Carmelo Palma	54,436	2.04	–	Pannella List	35,899	1.63	–
Carmelo Palma	54,436	2.04	–	Autonomist Front	2,703	0.12	–
Carmelo Palma	54,436	2.04	–	Total	38,602	1.75	–
Alessandro Lupi	45,428	1.70	–	Greens Greens	31,145	1.41	–
Renzo Rabellino	26,006	0.97	–	Piedmont Nation of Europe	16,356	0.74	–
Total candidates	2,668,876	100.00	12	Total parties	2,202,290	100.00	48
Source: Ministry of the Interior – Historical Archive of Elections
