= Piedmontese Union =

Former regionalist political party active in Piedmont, Italy

The Piedmontese Union (Union Piemontèisa, UP) was a regionalist political party active in Piedmont, Italy. It was founded in 1981 by Roberto Gremmo, a former member of the Italian Communist Party. The party was soon joined by Gipo Farassino, another former Communist and well-known folk-singer. The party disbanded in the 1990s and its successors include the Piedmontese section of Lega Padana led by Renzo Rabellino. In the 1985 Piedmontese regional election, the Piedmontese Union won 1.1% of the vote under the banner of Liga Veneta. In the 1987 Italian general election, Gremmo formed an alliance with Lega Lombarda led by Umberto Bossi but was damaged by the split led by Mario Borghezio, Farassino, and Rabellino, who formed Autonomist Piedmont.

For the 1989 European Parliament election in Italy, Bossi welcomed both the Piedmontese Union and Autonomist Piedmont into his Lega Lombarda – Alleanza Nord coalition. Gremmo refused to join forces again with Farassino and Borghezio, who were separatists while he was a federalist, and resigned from editor of Lombardia Autonomista, the official publication of Lega Lombarda. Subsequently, he refused to participate to the founding process of Lega Nord and the Piedmontese Union started its decline. In the 1990 Piedmontese regional election, the Piedmontese Union won 2.3% of the vote and Gremmo was elected to the Regional Council of Piedmont, while Autonomist Piedmont gained 5.1% and three regional councillors. For the 1992 Italian general election, Gremmo transformed the party into Lega Alpina Piemont (LAP), sister-party of the Lega Alpina Lumbarda; the Piedmontese Union, by now part of Lega Nord, won 16.3% in Piedmont while Lega Alpina Piemont just 2.2%.

== Leadership ==
- National Secretary: Roberto Gremmo (1981–1992)

== Bibliography ==
- History of Piedmontese autonomism
