= 2005 Piedmontese regional election =

Italian local election

2005 Piedmentese regional election
- 3–4 April 2005

All 60 seats to the Regional Council of Piedmont
- Turnout: 71.38% (▼0.58%)
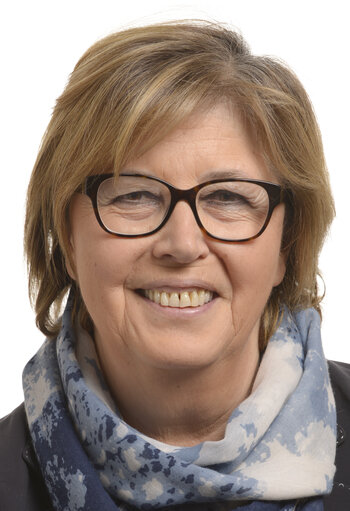

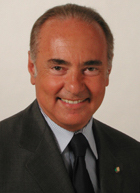
	Majority party	Minority party
Leader	Mercedes Bresso	Enzo Ghigo
Party	DS	Forza Italia
Alliance	The Union	House of Freedoms
Last election	18 seats, 39.5%	40 seats, 51.8%
Seats won	38	25
Seat change	▲20	▼15
Popular vote	1,226,355	1,133,358
Percentage	50.9%	47.0%
Swing	▲11.4%	▼4.8%
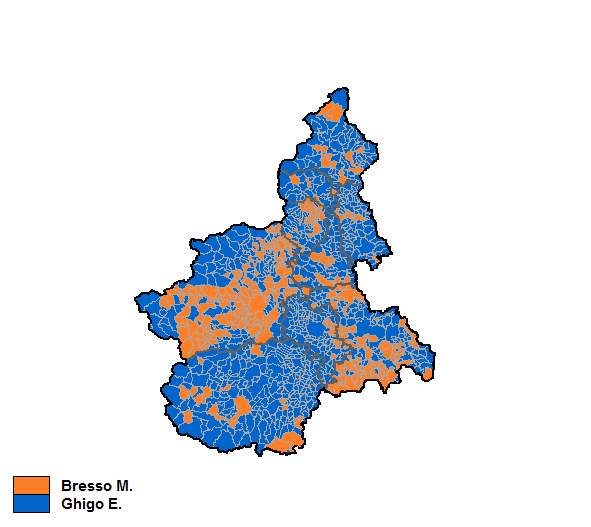
President before election
Enzo Ghigo
FI
President-elect
Mercedes Bresso
DS

The 2005 Piedmontese regional election took place on 3–4 April 2005. Mercedes Bresso of the Democrats of the Left defeated the incumbent Enzo Ghigo of Forza Italia.

== Electoral system ==
Regional elections in Piedmont were ruled by the Tatarella law, which was approved in 1995 and provided for a mixed electoral system. Four fifths of the regional councilors were elected in provincial constituencies by proportional representation, using the largest remainder method with a Droop quota and open lists, while the residual votes and the unassigned seats were grouped into a single regional constituency, where the whole ratios and the highest remainders were divided with the Hare quota among the provincial party lists; one fifth of the council seats instead was reserved for regional lists and assigned with a majoritarian representation system, in which the leader of the regional list that scored the highest number of votes was elected to the presidency of the region, while the other candidates were elected regional councilors.

A threshold of 3% had been established for the provincial lists, which could still have entered the regional council if the regional list to which they were connected had scored at least 5% of valid votes. The panachage was also allowed; the voter can indicate a candidate for the presidency but prefer a provincial list connected to another candidate.

== Parties and candidates ==
Political party or alliance	Constituent lists	Previous result		Candidate
Political party or alliance	Constituent lists	Votes (%)	Seats	Candidate
The Union	Democrats of the Left	17.7	9	Mercedes Bresso
The Union	Democracy is Freedom – The Daisy	7.9	3	Mercedes Bresso
The Union	Communist Refoundation Party	5.5	2	Mercedes Bresso
The Union	Federation of the Greens	2.1	1	Mercedes Bresso
The Union	Party of Italian Communists	2.1	1	Mercedes Bresso
The Union	Italian Democratic Socialists	1.8	1	Mercedes Bresso
The Union	Union of Democrats for Europe	—N/a	—N/a	Mercedes Bresso
The Union	Italy of Values	—N/a	—N/a	Mercedes Bresso
The Union	Others	—N/a	—N/a	Mercedes Bresso
House of Freedoms	Forza Italia	30.8	17	Enzo Ghigo
House of Freedoms	National Alliance	11.9	6	Enzo Ghigo
House of Freedoms	Northern League Piedmont	7.6	3	Enzo Ghigo
House of Freedoms	Union of Christian and Centre Democrats	4.5	2	Enzo Ghigo
House of Freedoms	Pensioners' Party	0.7	–	Enzo Ghigo
House of Freedoms	Greens Greens	0.4	–	Enzo Ghigo
House of Freedoms	Others	—N/a	—N/a	Enzo Ghigo

== Results ==
3–4 April 2005 Piedmontese regional election results
Candidates	Votes	%	Seats	Parties	Votes	%	Seats
Mercedes Bresso	1,226,355	50.91	12				
Mercedes Bresso	1,226,355	50.91	12	Democrats of the Left	411,237	20.10	11
Mercedes Bresso	1,226,355	50.91	12	Democracy is Freedom – The Daisy	211,457	10.34	6
Mercedes Bresso	1,226,355	50.91	12	Communist Refoundation Party	130,776	6.39	4
Mercedes Bresso	1,226,355	50.91	12	Together for Bresso	60,314	2.95	1
Mercedes Bresso	1,226,355	50.91	12	Federation of the Greens	57,516	2.81	1
Mercedes Bresso	1,226,355	50.91	12	Party of Italian Communists	53,359	2.61	1
Mercedes Bresso	1,226,355	50.91	12	Italian Democratic Socialists	49,821	2.44	1
Mercedes Bresso	1,226,355	50.91	12	Italy of Values	31,016	1.52	1
Mercedes Bresso	1,226,355	50.91	12	Union of Democrats for Europe	10,734	0.52	–
Mercedes Bresso	1,226,355	50.91	12	Pensioners for Europe	5,156	0.25	–
Mercedes Bresso	1,226,355	50.91	12	Total	1,021,386	49.93	26
Enzo Ghigo	1,133,358	47.05	1				
Enzo Ghigo	1,133,358	47.05	1	Forza Italia	457,397	22.36	11
Enzo Ghigo	1,133,358	47.05	1	National Alliance	195,318	9.55	5
Enzo Ghigo	1,133,358	47.05	1	Northern League Piedmont	173,020	8.46	4
Enzo Ghigo	1,133,358	47.05	1	Union of Christian and Centre Democrats	93,872	4.59	2
Enzo Ghigo	1,133,358	47.05	1	Greens Greens	23,761	1.16	1
Enzo Ghigo	1,133,358	47.05	1	Consumers' List	23.378	1.14	1
Enzo Ghigo	1,133,358	47.05	1	Socialists and Liberals	16.944	0.83	–
Enzo Ghigo	1,133,358	47.05	1	Pensioners' Party	11,883	0.58	–
Enzo Ghigo	1,133,358	47.05	1	Total	995,573	48.67	24
Gianfranco Rotondi	24,813	1.03	–	Democratic Ecologists – Christian Democracy	14,255	0.70	–
Lodovico Ellena	24,454	1.02	–	Social Alternative	14,515	0.71	–
Total candidates	2,408,980	100.00	13	Total parties	2,045,729	100.00	50
Source: Ministry of the Interior – Historical Archive of Elections
