= 1980 Piedmontese regional election =

Italian local election

The 1980 Piedmontese regional election took place on 8 June 1980.

== Events ==
In terms of popular vites, Christian Democracy resulted narrowly ahead of the Italian Communist Party but both had the same number of seats in the Regional Council of Piedmont. After the election, the Communists and the Italian Socialist Party decided to continue their political cooperation and formed a coalition government with the Italian Democratic Socialist Party under the leadership of a Socialist, Enzo Enrietti. In 1983, the Socialists switched sides and Aldo Viglione, a Socialist who had been president of Piedmont from 1975 to 1980, formed the Pentapartito as the new regional government, along with the Christian Democrats, the Democratic Socialists, the Italian Liberal Party, and the Italian Republican Party.

== Results ==
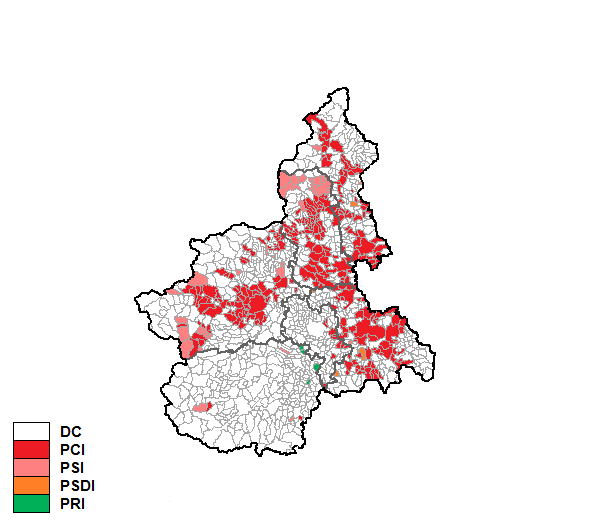
Largest party by municipality

Party	votes	votes (%)	seats
Christian Democracy	956,356	32.4	20
Italian Communist Party	932,888	31.7	20
Italian Socialist Party	417,763	14.2	9
Italian Democratic Socialist Party	176,412	6.0	3
Italian Liberal Party	174,728	5.9	3
Italian Social Movement	117,724	4.0	2
Italian Republican Party	98,155	3.3	2
Proletarian Unity Party	29,656	1.0	1
Proletarian Democracy	24,998	0.9	-
Piedmontese Union – List for Trieste	15,627	0.5	-
Revolutionary Communist League	2,388	0.1	-
Revolutionary Socialist League	1,143	0.0	-
Total	2,947,838	100.0	60

Source: Ministry of the Interior
