= Stefano Allasia =

Italian politician (born 1974)

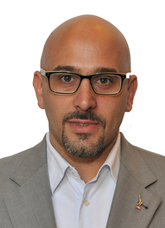
- Allasia in 2013

Member of the Chamber of Deputies
- In office 16 April 2013 – 22 March 2018
- Preceded by: Roberto Cota
- Constituency: Piedmont 1
- In office 28 April 2006 – 14 March 2013
- Constituency: Piedmont 1

President of the Regional Council of Piedmont
- In office 2 July 2019 – 22 July 2024
- Preceded by: Nino Boeti
- Succeeded by: Davide Nicco

Personal details
- Born: 6 December 1974 (age 51) Turin, Piedmont, Italy
- Party: Lega

Stefano Allasia (born 6 December 1974) is an Italian politician. He was a member of the Chamber of Deputies from 2006 to 2013 and from 2013 to 2018. From 2019 to 2024, he served as president of the Regional Council of Piedmont.
