= 2019 Piedmontese regional election =

Italian local election

- 26 May 2019

All 51 seats to the Regional Council of Piedmont
- Turnout: 63.34% (▼3.2%)
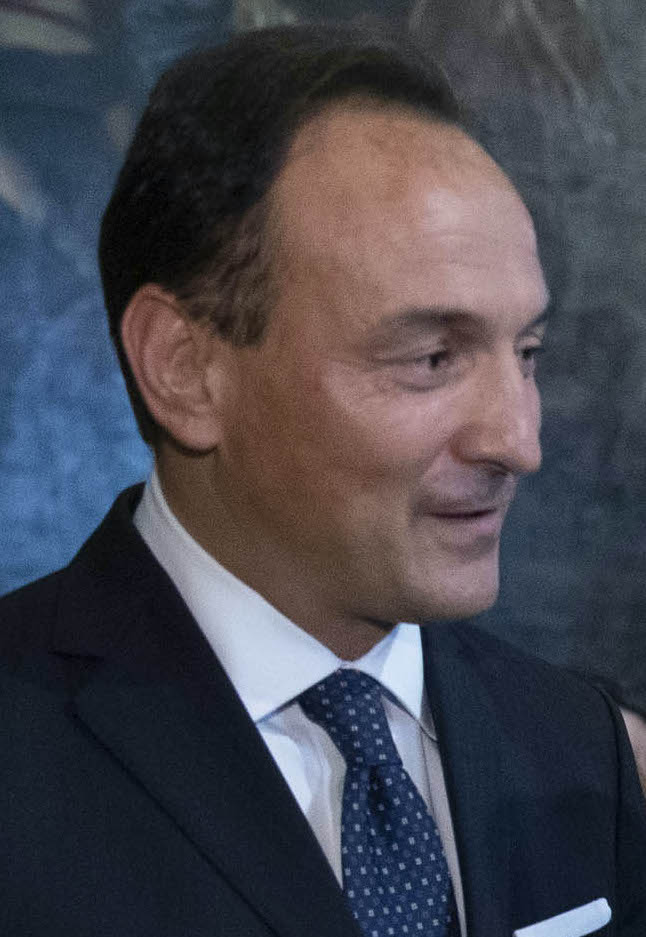

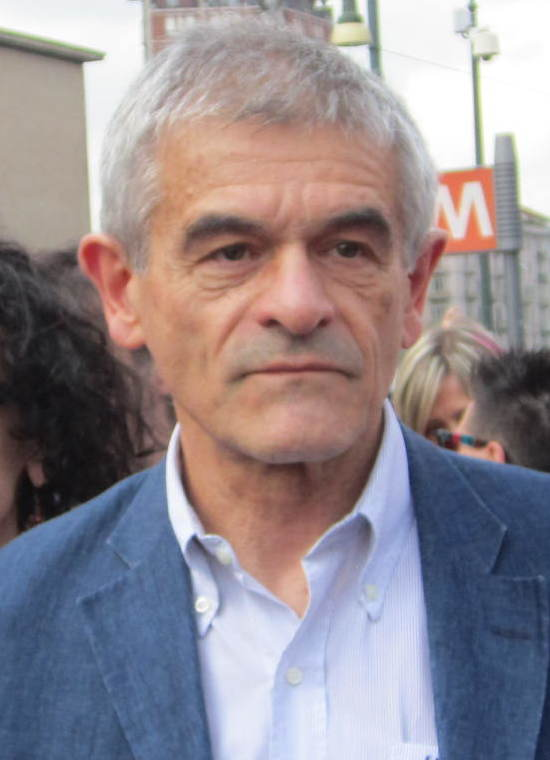

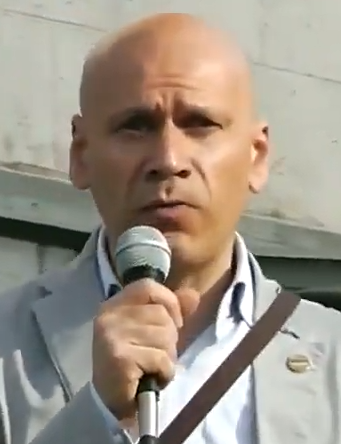
	Majority party	Minority party	Third party
Candidate	Alberto Cirio	Sergio Chiamparino	Giorgio Bertola
Party	Forza Italia	Democratic Party	Five Star Movement
Alliance	Centre-right	Centre-left
Seats won	33	13	5
Seat change	▲23	▼20	▼3
Popular vote	1,091,814	783,805	298,086
Percentage	49.9%	35.8%	13.6%
Swing	▲22.5%	▼11.3%	▼7.9%
- Popular vote and seat totals by province. As this is a proportional representation election, seat totals are determined by popular vote in each province. The provinces of Asti, Biella, Verbano-Cusio-Ossola, and Vercelli all returned a single member.
President before election
Sergio Chiamparino
PD
Elected President
Alberto Cirio
Forza Italia

The 2019 Piedmontese regional election took place on 26 May 2019, the same day as the 2019 European Parliament election in Italy. The election was for all 50 members of the Regional Council of Piedmont, as well as for the president of Piedmont, who is also a member of the council.

== Electoral system ==
Regional elections in Piedmont were ruled by the Tatarella law, which was approved in 1995 and provided for a mixed electoral system. Four fifths of the regional councilors were elected in provincial constituencies by proportional representation, using the largest remainder method with a Droop quota and open lists, while the residual votes and the unassigned seats were grouped into a single regional constituency, where the whole ratios and the highest remainders were divided with the Hare quota among the provincial party lists; one fifth of the council seats instead was reserved for regional lists and assigned with a majoritarian representation system, in which the leader of the regional list that scored the highest number of votes was elected to the presidency of the region, while the other candidates were elected regional councilors.

A threshold of 3% had been established for the provincial lists, which could still have entered the regional council if the regional list to which they were connected had scored at least 5% of valid votes. The panachage was also allowed; the voter can indicate a candidate for the presidency but prefer a provincial list connected to another candidate.

== Background ==
Sergio Chiamparino, the outgoing president of Piedmont for the Democratic Party, initially stated in June 2018 to not run for a second term. In September 2018, he declared he would run in the next regional election. He supported the joint candidacy of Turin, Milan, and Cortina d'Ampezzo for the 2026 Winter Olympics before Chiara Appendino, mayor of Turin for the Five Star Movement (M5S), decided to withdraw from the bidding process. He supported the Turin–Lyon high-speed railway and criticized the first Conte government for its opposition, led mainly by the M5S. Finally, he advocated a referendum about the Turin–Lyon on the same day as the regional election and asked to the Italian Minister of the Interior, Matteo Salvini, to allow it; both Giuseppe Conte, the Prime Minister of Italy, and Salvini rejected the idea.

The country's centre-right coalition had some troubles to reach an agreement for a unitary candidate. Alberto Cirio, the then Member of the European Parliament, was the candidate proposed by Forza Italia; the League opposed his candidacy, proposing instead the entrepreneur Paolo Damilano. After the 2019 Basilicata regional election held on 24 March, the centre-right agreed to the candidacy of Cirio. Cirio was the former deputy mayor for Alba and former regional assessor for Piedmont; he was elected in the 2014 European Parliament election in Italy in the North-West Italy constituency with 35.388 votes, and he backed the Turin–Lyon high-speed railway. In June 2018, along with 50 regional councillors, he was committed to stand trial on charges of misappropriating €20,000 of public funds, during 2008 and 2010, under the presidency of Mercedes Bresso. In February 2019, the Turin public prosecutor's office filed a motion to dismiss.

The candidate for the presidency of Piedmont for the M5S was voted on the party website. With 1,540 votes, Giorgio Bertola, outgoing regional councillor for Piedmont, won the primary election. He strongly opposed the Turin–Lyon and the referendum proposed by Chiamparino.

== Parties and candidates ==
Political party or alliance	Constituent lists	Previous result		Candidate
Political party or alliance	Constituent lists	Votes (%)	Seats	Candidate
Centre-left coalition	Democratic Party (PD)	36.2	17	Sergio Chiamparino
Centre-left coalition	Chiamparino for Piedmont of Yes	4.9	2	Sergio Chiamparino
Centre-left coalition	Moderates for Chiamparino	2.5	1	Sergio Chiamparino
Centre-left coalition	Italia in Comune (IiC)	—N/a	—N/a	Sergio Chiamparino
Centre-left coalition	More Europe (+E)	—N/a	—N/a	Sergio Chiamparino
Centre-left coalition	Free, Equal, Greens (incl. Art.1, SI, Pos and FdV)	—N/a	—N/a	Sergio Chiamparino
Centre-left coalition	Yes Chiamparino – Demo.S	—N/a	—N/a	Sergio Chiamparino
Centre-right coalition	Forza Italia (FI)	15.6	6	Alberto Cirio
Centre-right coalition	League (Lega)	7.3	2	Alberto Cirio
Centre-right coalition	Brothers of Italy (FdI)	3.7	1	Alberto Cirio
Centre-right coalition	Union of the Centre (UdC)	—N/a	—N/a	Alberto Cirio
Centre-right coalition	Yes TAV Yes Work for Piedmont in the Heart (incl. EpI and MNS)	—N/a	—N/a	Alberto Cirio
Five Star Movement (M5S)		20.3	8	Giorgio Bertola
The People of the Family (PdF)		—N/a	—N/a	Valter Boero

== Debates ==
There were seven presidential debates held across Piedmont, and in one case in Veneto, during the electoral campaign.

2019 Piedmontese presidential debates
Date	Location	Participants			
P Participant. N Non-invitee. A Absent invitee.		Chiamparino	Cirio	Bertola	Boero
21 May 2019	Teatro Regio, Turin	P	P	P	P
20 May 2019	Turin	P	P	P	P
14 May 2019	Turin	P	P	P	P
9 May 2019	Teatro Toselli, Cuneo	P	P	P	P
8 May 2019	Turin	P	P	P	P
4 May 2019	Domodossola, Verbano Cusio Ossola	P	P	P	P
10 April 2019	Vinitaly, Verona	P	P	N	N

== Opinion polls ==
Exit poll

Date	Polling firm	Chiamparino	Cirio	Bertola	Boero	Undecided	Lead
26 May 2019	Election Results	35.8	49.9	13.6	0.7	N/A	14.1
26 May 2019	Opinio Italia	36.5–40.5	45.0–49.0	12.0–16.0	0.0–1.0	N/A	8.5
8 May 2019	Noto	41.0	43.0	15.0	1.0	16.0	2.0
13 Apr 2019	Ipsos	40.8	40.2	16.1	2.9	45.0	0.6

== Results ==
Popular vote and seat totals by province. As this is a proportional representation election, seat totals are determined by popular vote in each province. The provinces of Asti, Biella, Verbano-Cusio-Ossola, and Vercelli all returned a single member.

26 May 2019 Piedmontese regional election results
Candidates	Votes	%	Seats	Parties	Votes	%	Seats
Alberto Cirio	1,091,814	49.86	11	League	712,703	37.11	17
Alberto Cirio	1,091,814	49.86	11	Forza Italia	161,137	8.39	3
Alberto Cirio	1,091,814	49.86	11	Brothers of Italy	105,410	5.49	2
Alberto Cirio	1,091,814	49.86	11	Yes TAV Yes Work for Piedmont in the Heart	27,072	1.41	–
Alberto Cirio	1,091,814	49.86	11	Union of the Centre	22,179	1.15	–
Alberto Cirio	1,091,814	49.86	11	Total	1,028,501	53.55	22
Sergio Chiamparino	783,805	35.80	1	Democratic Party	430,902	22.44	9
Sergio Chiamparino	783,805	35.80	1	Chiamparino for Piedmont of Yes	63,933	3.33	1
Sergio Chiamparino	783,805	35.80	1	Free, Equal, Greens	46,570	2.42	1
Sergio Chiamparino	783,805	35.80	1	Moderates for Chiamparino	36,125	1.88	1
Sergio Chiamparino	783,805	35.80	1	More Europe	34,993	1.82	–
Sergio Chiamparino	783,805	35.80	1	Yes Chiamparino – Demo.S	15,096	0.79	–
Sergio Chiamparino	783,805	35.80	1	Piedmont in Common	11,183	0.58	–
Sergio Chiamparino	783,805	35.80	1	Total	638,802	33.26	12
Giorgio Bertola	298,086	13.61	–	Five Star Movement	241,014	12.55	5
Valter Boero	15,935	0.73	–	The People of the Family	12,259	0.64	–
Blank or invalid votes	100,721	-	-				
Total candidates	2,290,361	100.00	12	Total parties	1,920,576	100.00	39
Registered voters / Turnout	3,616,191	63.34	-				
Source: Ministry of the Interior

Party vote
Lega	37.11%
PD	22.44%
M5S	12.55%
FI	8.39%
FdI	5.49%
Chiamparino	3.33%
LUV	2.42%
Moderates	1.88%
+E	1.82%
Sì Tav–PnC	1.41%
UdC	1.15%
Other	2.01%

President vote
Cirio	49.86%
Chiamparino	35.80%
Bertola	13.61%
Boero	0.73%

== See also ==
- 2019 Italian regional elections
