= Alberto Cirio =

Italian politician (born 1972)

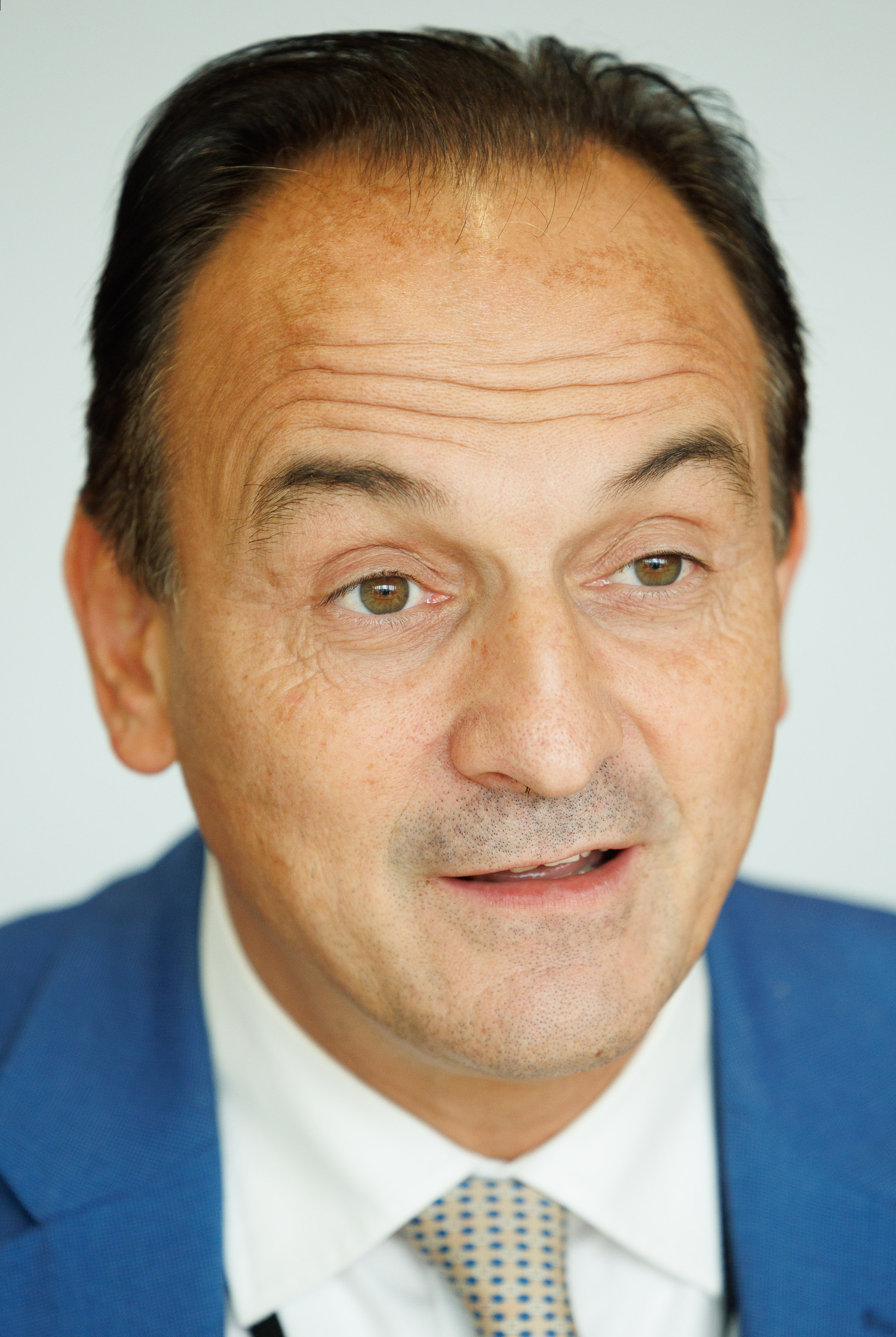

President of Piedmont
- Incumbent
- Assumed office 6 June 2019
- Preceded by: Sergio Chiamparino

Member of the European Parliament
- In office 1 July 2014 – 2 July 2019
- Constituency: North-West Italy

Personal details
- Born: 6 December 1972 (age 53) Turin, Italy
- Party: LN (1995–2004); FI (2004–2009); PdL (2009–2013); FI (since 2013)
- Spouse: Sara
- Children: 2
- Education: University of Turin
- Profession: Entrepreneur

Alberto Cirio (born 6 December 1972) is an Italian politician, who is the current President of Piedmont and a former Member of the European Parliament (MEP) from Italy. He is a member of the centre-right Forza Italia.

== Biography ==
Cirio studied law at the University of Turin. Cirio served as Deputy Mayor of Alba from 1995 to 2005. In 2005 he was elected Regional Councilor of Piedmont. In 2010 Cirio was re-elected to the Regional Council. Regional Minister for Education, Tourism and Sport in the Piedmont Region from 2010 to 2014.

In the 2014 European Parliament election in Piedmont, Cirio was elected to the European Parliament for the North-West region. On 26 May 2019 he was elected President of Piedmont, supported by Forza Italia, the Northern League, Brothers of Italy and Union of the Centre.

On 9 June 2024 he was reelected President of Piedmont, supported by the center-right coalition.
