= 1990 Piedmontese regional election =

Italian local election

The 1990 Piedmontese regional election took place on 6–7 May 1990.

== Events ==
Christian Democracy and the Italian Communist Party lost many votes, especially to the green and regionalist parties. After the election to the Regional Council of Piedmont, Gian Paolo Brizio, a Christian Democrat, continued the Pentapartito government comprising the Italian Socialist Party, the Italian Liberal Party, the Italian Republican Party, and the Italian Democratic Socialist Party. In 1994, following the Tangentopoli-crisis and the dissolution of Christian Democracy, Brizio, who had joined to the Italian People's Party, formed a new government that included the Democratic Party of the Left, which was the successor party of the Communists, and the Socialists.

== Results ==
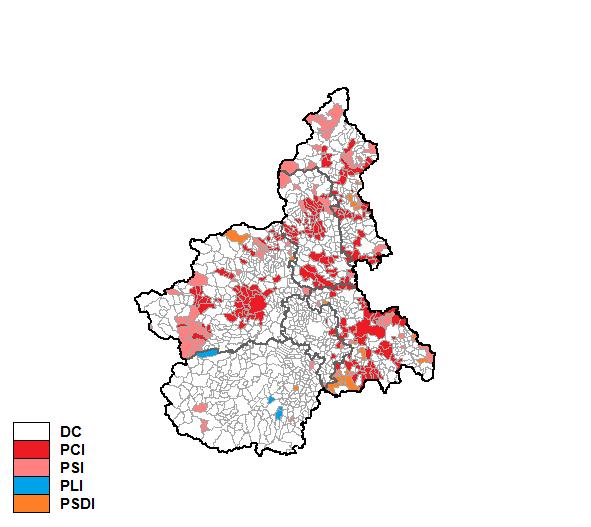
Largest party by municipality

Party	votes	votes (%)	seats
Christian Democracy	814,359	27.9	18
Italian Communist Party	663,468	22.8	14
Italian Socialist Party	445,768	15.3	9
Northern League – Autonomist Piedmont	148,450	5.1	3
Italian Liberal Party	120,677	4.1	2
Italian Republican Party	116,344	4.0	2
Green List	113,760	3.9	2
Italian Social Movement	104,851	3.6	2
Italian Democratic Socialist Party	92,559	3.2	2
Rainbow Greens	80,492	2.8	2
Piedmontese Union	66,559	2.3	1
Pensioners' Party	39,539	1.4	1
Antiprohibitionists on Drugs	33,718	1.2	1
Proletarian Democracy	30,927	1.1	1
Pensioners' List	17,394	0.6	-
Ecological List	7,413	0.3	-
Anti-hunting Piedmont	6,682	0.2	-
Party of Motorists	4,775	0.2	-
Azure List	3,917	0.1	-
Democratic Party – others	2,163	0.1	-
Total	2,914,160	100.0	60

Source: Ministry of the Interior
