= 2010 Piedmontese regional election =

Italian local election

2010 Piedmentese regional election
- 28–29 March 2010

All 60 seats to the Regional Council of Piedmont
- Turnout: 64.33% (▼7.04%)
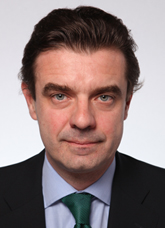

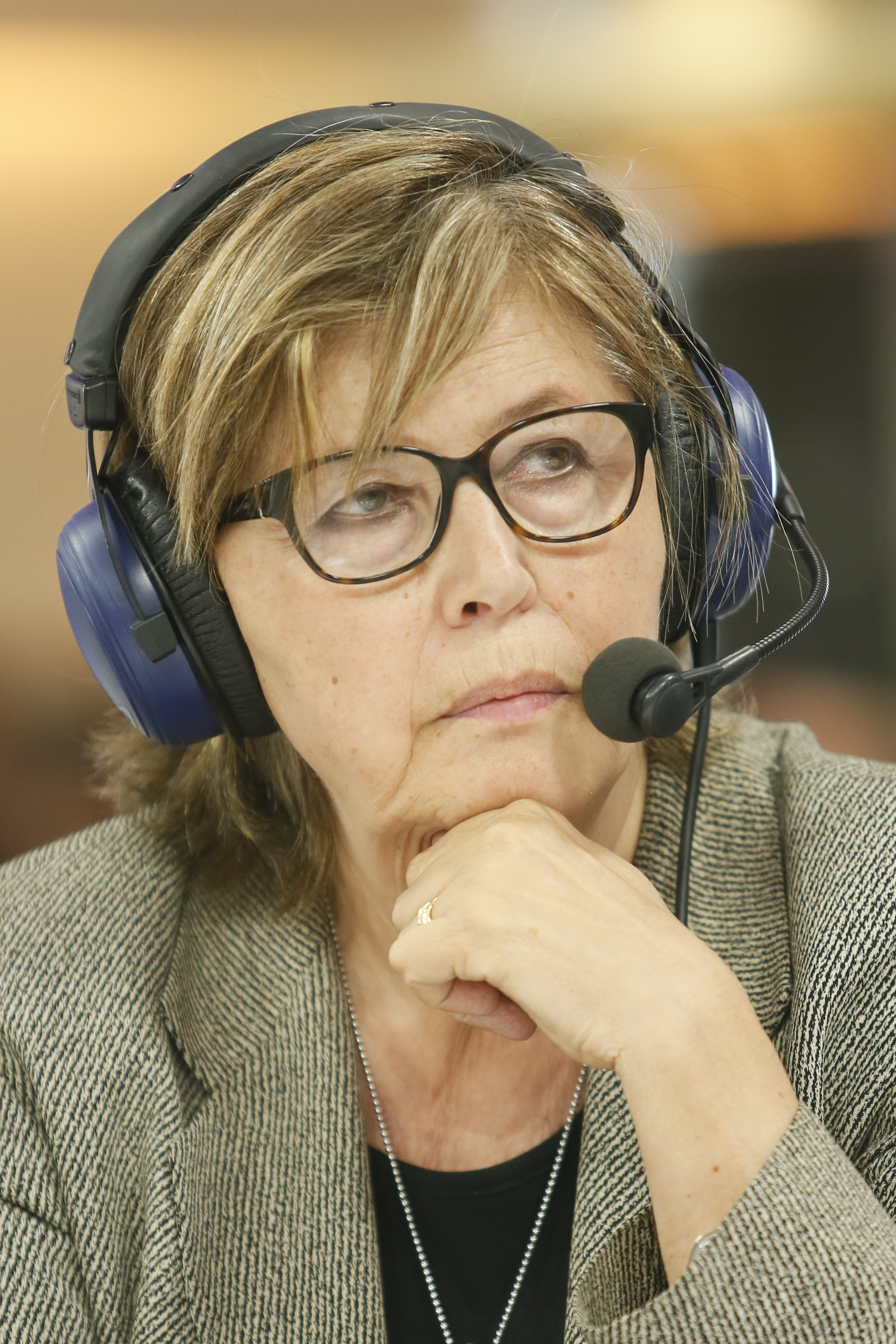
	Majority party	Minority party
Leader	Roberto Cota	Mercedes Bresso
Party	Northern League	Democratic Party
Alliance	Centre-right	Centre-left
Last election	25 seats, 47.0%	38 seats, 50.9%
Seats won	36	22
Seat change	▲11	▼16
Popular vote	1,043,318	1,033,946
Percentage	47.3%	46.9%
Swing	▲0.3%	▼4.0%
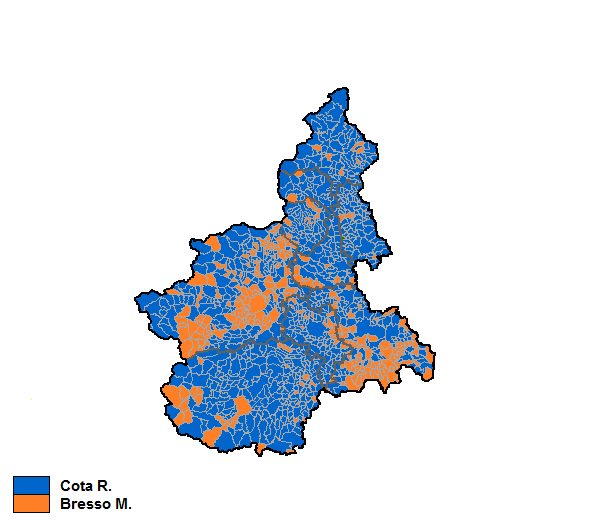
President before election
Mercedes Bresso
PD
President-elect
Roberto Cota
LN

The 2010 Piedmontese regional election took place on 28–29 March 2010 as part of Italy's round of regional elections. Mercedes Bresso of the centre-left Democratic Party, the incumbent president of the region, lost her seat to Roberto Cota, leader of the Northern League Piedmont (Lega Piemonte) and floor leader of Lega Nord (Northern League) in the Italian Chamber of Deputies, who was backed also by The People of Freedom.

Cota's lead of Bresso was of only 0.4%, in one of the region's narrowest elections ever. The League thus secured a second region, after having conquered the presidency of Veneto with Luca Zaia with a much more convincing margin.

In January 2014, the election results were annulled on the grounds that the Pensioners' Party list in Cota's center-right alliance had been submitted with forged signatures. Although the Cota government filed an appeal, it was overturned by the Council of State on 11 February 2014 and the government was ordered to call new elections. On 6 March, the Piedmontese regional administrative court upheld an appeal from the Five Star Movement and ordered Cota to hold new elections within one week of the notification of the ruling.

== Electoral system ==
Regional elections in Piedmont were ruled by the Tatarella law, which was approved in 1995 and provided for a mixed electoral system. Four fifths of the regional councilors were elected in provincial constituencies by proportional representation, using the largest remainder method with a Droop quota and open lists, while the residual votes and the unassigned seats were grouped into a single regional constituency, where the whole ratios and the highest remainders were divided with the Hare quota among the provincial party lists; one fifth of the council seats instead was reserved for regional lists and assigned with a majoritarian representation system, in which the leader of the regional list that scored the highest number of votes was elected to the presidency of the region, while the other candidates were elected regional councilors.

A threshold of 3% had been established for the provincial lists, which could still have entered the regional council if the regional list to which they were connected had scored at least 5% of valid votes. The panachage was also allowed; the voter can indicate a candidate for the presidency but prefer a provincial list connected to another candidate.

== Background ==
Bresso was one of the last bulwarks of the country's centre-left coalition in Central Italy and thus all Democratic Party members endorsed her in a key test of the coalition's strength after two years in opposition in Rome. For his part, Cota's choice was a little bit surprising as Piedmont is not really a stronghold for his party, which is much stronger in Veneto and Lombardy. The day after his bid was announced, Cota explained that it is time to rewrite the history of Italian unification, that was led by the Kingdom of Sardinia under the House of Savoy. Cota underlined that Piedmont was once an independent state and told that even Camillo Benso, Count of Cavour, did not intend to unify the whole Italian Peninsula and later favoured a federal reform of the new Kingdom of Italy.

Cota, who is a republican and has no nostalgia of the House of Savoy, said his message would do well in Piedmont and that he would overcome the weakness of Lega Piemonte that usually gets far fewer votes than Liga Veneta in Veneto and Lega Lombarda in Lombardy. In Cota's view, most of his support would come from industrial workers, including those of Southern Italy descent, and Catholics embarrassed by Bresso's secularism. The Union of the Centre, whose main aim in the election was to fight back the Northern League, chose to support Bresso, turning down the chance of running its own candidate, the most likely being Michele Vietti. Most Catholic voters disagreed.

== Parties and candidates ==
Political party or alliance	Constituent lists	Previous result		Candidate
Political party or alliance	Constituent lists	Votes (%)	Seats	Candidate
Centre-left coalition	Democratic Party	30.4	17	Mercedes Bresso
Centre-left coalition	Federation of the Left	9.0	5	Mercedes Bresso
Centre-left coalition	Union of the Centre	4.6	2	Mercedes Bresso
Centre-left coalition	Together for Bresso	2.9	1	Mercedes Bresso
Centre-left coalition	Federation of the Greens	2.8	1	Mercedes Bresso
Centre-left coalition	Italian Socialist Party – United Socialists	2.4	1	Mercedes Bresso
Centre-left coalition	Italy of Values	1.5	1	Mercedes Bresso
Centre-left coalition	Left Ecology Freedom	—N/a	—N/a	Mercedes Bresso
Centre-left coalition	Moderates	—N/a	—N/a	Mercedes Bresso
Centre-left coalition	Bonino-Pannella List	—N/a	—N/a	Mercedes Bresso
Centre-left coalition	Others	—N/a	—N/a	Mercedes Bresso
Centre-right coalition	The People of Freedom	31.9	16	Roberto Cota
Centre-right coalition	Northern League Piedmont	8.5	4	Roberto Cota
Centre-right coalition	Greens Greens	1.2	1	Roberto Cota
Centre-right coalition	Consumers	1.1	1	Roberto Cota
Centre-right coalition	Pensioners' Party	0.6	–	Roberto Cota
Centre-right coalition	Others	—N/a	—N/a	Roberto Cota
Five Star Movement		—N/a	—N/a	Davide Bono

== Results ==
28–29 March 2010 Piedmontese regional election results
Candidates	Votes	%	Seats	Parties	Votes	%	Seats
Roberto Cota	1,043,318	47.33	12				
Roberto Cota	1,043,318	47.33	12	The People of Freedom	474,431	25.05	13
Roberto Cota	1,043,318	47.33	12	Northern League Piedmont	317,065	16.74	9
Roberto Cota	1,043,318	47.33	12	Greens Greens	33,411	1.76	1
Roberto Cota	1,043,318	47.33	12	Pensioners' Party	27,797	1.47	1
Roberto Cota	1,043,318	47.33	12	The Right	12,581	0.66	–
Roberto Cota	1,043,318	47.33	12	To the Centre with Scanderebech	12,154	0.64	–
Roberto Cota	1,043,318	47.33	12	Alliance of the Centre – Christian Democracy	5,704	0.30	–
Roberto Cota	1,043,318	47.33	12	New Italian Socialist Party	3,947	0.21	–
Roberto Cota	1,043,318	47.33	12	Consumers	8,826	0.15	–
Roberto Cota	1,043,318	47.33	12	Total	889,916	46.98	24
Mercedes Bresso	1,033,946	46.91	1				
Mercedes Bresso	1,033,946	46.91	1	Democratic Party	439,663	23.21	12
Mercedes Bresso	1,033,946	46.91	1	Italy of Values	130,649	6.90	3
Mercedes Bresso	1,033,946	46.91	1	Union of the Centre	74,412	3.93	2
Mercedes Bresso	1,033,946	46.91	1	Together for Bresso	61,476	3.25	1
Mercedes Bresso	1,033,946	46.91	1	Moderates	58,010	3.06	1
Mercedes Bresso	1,033,946	46.91	1	Federation of the Left	50,191	2.65	1
Mercedes Bresso	1,033,946	46.91	1	Left Ecology Freedom	27,198	1.44	1
Mercedes Bresso	1,033,946	46.91	1	Federation of the Greens	14,575	0.77	–
Mercedes Bresso	1,033,946	46.91	1	Italian Socialist Party – United Socialists	14,077	0.74	–
Mercedes Bresso	1,033,946	46.91	1	Bonino-Pannella List	13,572	0.72	–
Mercedes Bresso	1,033,946	46.91	1	Pensioners and Disabled for Bresso	12,564	0.66	–
Mercedes Bresso	1,033,946	46.91	1	PiedmontYes – Populars – Autonomous Region	4,150	0.22	–
Mercedes Bresso	1,033,946	46.91	1	Total	900,537	47.55	21
Davide Bono	90,086	4.09	–	Five Star Movement	69,448	3.67	2
Renzo Rabellino	36,999	1.68	–				
Renzo Rabellino	36,999	1.68	–	List of Talking Crickets – No Euro	13,186	0.70	–
Renzo Rabellino	36,999	1.68	–	Lega Padana Piemont	7,805	0.41	–
Renzo Rabellino	36,999	1.68	–	Forza Toro	3,494	0.18	–
Renzo Rabellino	36,999	1.68	–	New Force	2,151	0.11	–
Renzo Rabellino	36,999	1.68	–	Tricolour Flame	1,998	0.11	–
Renzo Rabellino	36,999	1.68	–	UDEUR – Christian Democracy – Others	1,670	0.09	–
Renzo Rabellino	36,999	1.68	–	No Nuclear – No TAV	1,553	0.08	–
Renzo Rabellino	36,999	1.68	–	Alliance for Turin	1,237	0.07	–
Renzo Rabellino	36,999	1.68	–	Young People Under 30	1,076	0.06	–
Renzo Rabellino	36,999	1.68	–	Total	34,170	1.80	–
Total candidates	2,204,349	100.00	13	Total parties	1,894,071	100.00	47
Source: Ministry of the Interior – Historical Archive of Elections

== See also ==
- 2010 Italian regional elections
