= Regional Council of Piedmont =

Legislative organ of Piedmont, Italy

Regional Council of Piedmont Consiglio Regionale del Piemonte
- 12th legislature

Type
- Type: Regional council Unicameral
- Established: 23 July 1970

Leadership
- President: Davide Nicco, FdI since 22 July 2024

Structure
- Seats: 51
- Political groups: Government (31): FdI (13); FI (7); Lega (6); CP (5); Opposition (20): PD (13); AVS (3); M5S (3); SUE (1)
- Length of term: 5 years

Elections
- Voting system: Party-list semi-proportional representation with majority bonus D'Hondt method
- Last election: 8–9 June 2024
- Next election: No later than 10 June 2029

Meeting place
- Palazzo Lascaris di Ventimiglia, Turin

Website
- Official website

The Regional Council of Piedmont (Italian: Consiglio Regionale del Piemonte) is the legislative assembly of Piedmont.

It was first elected in 1970, when the ordinary regions were instituted, on the basis of the Constitution of Italy of 1948.

== Composition ==
The Regional Council of Piedmont is composed of 51 members, of which 49 are elected in provincial constituencies with proportional representation, one is for the candidate for President who comes second, who usually becomes the leader of the opposition in the Council, and one is for the elected president.

The Council is elected for a five-year term, but, if the President suffers a vote of no confidence, resigns or dies, under the simul stabunt vel simul cadent clause (introduced in 1999), also the Council will be dissolved and there will be a snap election.

=== Political groups (2024–2029) ===
The Regional Council of Piedmont is currently composed of the following political groups:

Party	Seats	Status
Brothers of Italy (FdI)	13 / 51	Government
Democratic Party (PD)	13 / 51	Opposition
Forza Italia (FI)	7 / 51	Government
League (Lega)	6 / 51	Government
Cirio for President (CP)	5 / 51	Government
Greens and Left Alliance (AVS)	3 / 51	Opposition
Five Star Movement (M5S)	3 / 51	Opposition
United States of Europe (SUE)	1 / 51	Opposition

By coalition:

Party	Seats	Status
Centre-right coalition	31 / 51	Government
Centre-left coalition	17 / 51	Opposition
Five Star Movement	3 / 51	Opposition

=== Historical composition ===
Election	DC	PCI	PSI	PLI	PRI	PSDI	MSI	Others	Total
7 June 1970	20	13	5	4	1	4	2	1	50
15 June 1975	20	22	8	2	2	4	2	-	60
8 June 1980	20	20	9	3	2	3	2	1	60
12 May 1985	19	18	8	3	3	3	3	3	60
6 May 1990	18	14	9	2	2	2	2	11	60

Election	Majority	Opposition	Council	President of the Region
23 April 1995	Centre-right (Pole for Freedoms) 33 / 60	Centre-left (The Olive Tree) 18 / 60 LN 5 / 60 PRC 4 / 60		Enzo Ghigo (1995–2005)
16 April 2000	Centre-right (House of Freedoms) 40 / 60	Centre-left (The Olive Tree) 18 / 60 Bonino List 2 / 60		Enzo Ghigo (1995–2005)
3 April 2005	Centre-left (The Union) 38 / 63	Centre-right (House of Freedoms) 25 / 63		Mercedes Bresso (2005–2010)
28 March 2010	Centre-right 36 / 60	Centre-left 22 / 60 M5S 2 / 60		Roberto Cota (2010–2014)
25 May 2014 (snap election)	Centre-left 33 / 51	Centre-right 9 / 51 M5S 8 / 51 FdI 1 / 51		Sergio Chiamparino (2014–2019)
26 May 2019	Centre-right 33 / 51	Centre-left 13 / 51 M5S 5 / 51		Alberto Cirio (since 2019)
9 June 2024	Centre-right 31 / 51	Centre-left 17 / 51 M5S 3 / 51		Alberto Cirio (since 2019)

== Presidents ==
This is a list of the Presidents of the Regional Council (Italian: Presidenti del Consiglio regionale):

Name	Period		Regional Legislature
Paolo Battino Vittorelli (PSI)	23 July 1970	9 March 1972	I (1970)
Gianni Oberto Tarena (DC)	9 March 1972	21 December 1973	I (1970)
Aldo Viglione (PSI)	21 December 1973	21 July 1975	I (1970)
Dino Sanlorenzo (PCI)	21 July 1975	14 July 1980	II (1975)
Germano Benzi (PSI)	14 July 1980	17 June 1985	III (1980)
Aldo Viglione (PSI)	17 June 1985	1 December 1988	IV (1985)
Angelo Rossa (PSI)	1 December 1988	11 June 1990	IV (1985)
Carlo Spagnuolo (PSI)	11 June 1990	19 June 1995	V (1990)
Rolando Picchioni (CDU)	19 June 1995	21 January 1998	VI (1995)
Sergio Deorsola (CDU)	21 January 1998	29 May 2000	VI (1995)
Roberto Cota (LN)	29 May 2000	17 January 2005	VII (2000)
Oreste Rossi (LN)	17 January 2005	16 May 2005	VII (2000)
Davide Gariglio (PD)	16 May 2005	9 April 2010	VIII (2005)
Valerio Cattaneo (PdL)	9 April 2010	30 June 2014	IX (2010)
Mario Laus (PD)	30 June 2014	10 April 2018	X (2014)
Nino Boeti (PD)	10 April 2018	2 July 2019	X (2014)
Stefano Allasia (Lega)	2 July 2019	22 July 2024	XI (2019)
Davide Nicco (FdI)	22 July 2024	Incumbent	XII (2024)

== See also ==
- Regional council
- Politics of Piedmont
- President of Piedmont
