= 1970 Piedmontese regional election =

Italian local election

The 1970 Piedmontese regional election took place on 7–8 June 1970.

== Events ==
Christian Democracy was by far the largest party in the Regional Council of Piedmont. After the election, it formed an organic centre-left government with the Italian Socialist Party, the Unitary Socialist Party, and the Italian Republican Party. The regional government was led by Edoardo Calleri di Sala until 1973, and then by Gianni Oberto Tarena, both members of Christian Democracy.

== Results ==
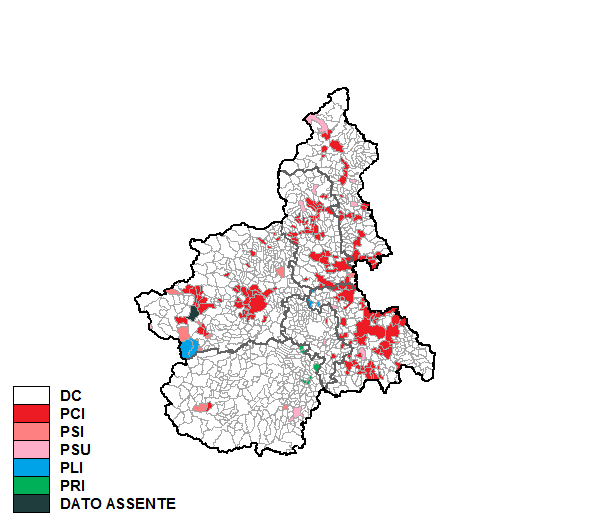
Largest party by municipality

Party	votes	votes (%)	seats
Christian Democracy	1,029,883	36.7	20
Italian Communist Party	727,619	25.9	13
Italian Socialist Party	296,219	10.6	5
Unitary Socialist Party	231,121	8.2	4
Italian Liberal Party	225,395	8.0	4
Italian Social Movement	92,951	3.3	2
Italian Socialist Party of Proletarian Unity	87,473	3.1	1
Italian Republican Party	87,100	3.1	1
Italian Democratic Party of Monarchist Unity	28,025	1.0	-
Total	2,805,786	100.0	50

Source: Ministry of the Interior
