= 1985 Piedmontese regional election =

Italian local election

The 1985 Piedmontese regional election took place on 12 May 1985.

== Events ==
In the Regional Council of Piedmont, Christian Democracy resulted narrowly ahead of the Italian Communist Party, which had been ousted from the regional government by the Italian Socialist Party in 1983. After the election, the Socialists and Christian Democrats, along with the Italian Republican Party, the Italian Liberal Party, and the Italian Democratic Socialist Party, continued their Pentapartito alliance but this time the regional government was led by a Christian Democrat, Vittorio Beltrami.

== Results ==
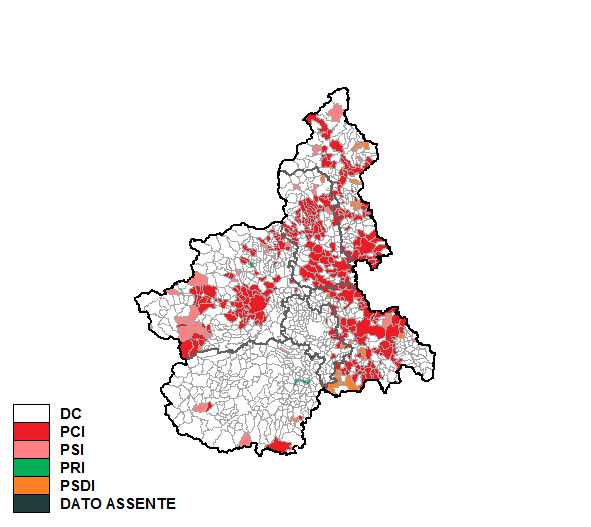
Largest party by municipality

Party	votes	votes (%)	seats
Christian Democracy	918,557	30.5	19
Italian Communist Party	871,141	28.9	18
Italian Socialist Party	389,170	12.9	8
Italian Social Movement	165,691	5.5	3
Italian Republican Party	158,597	5.3	3
Italian Liberal Party	152,989	5.1	3
Italian Democratic Socialist Party	143,055	4.7	3
Civic Greens	52,240	1.7	1
Green List	50,091	1.7	1
Proletarian Democracy	48,575	1.6	1
Piedmontese Union – Venetian League	33,978	1.1	-
Pensioners Italian Alliance	23,927	0.8	-
Pensioners' National Party	8,545	0.3	-
Total	3,016,556	100.0	60

Source: Ministry of the Interior
