= 1975 Piedmontese regional election =

Italian local election

The 1975 Piedmontese regional election took place on 15 June 1975. Ten new seats were added to the Regional Council of Piedmont following the 1971 census.

== Events ==
Christian Democracy resulted narrowly behind the Italian Communist Party, which was the real winner of the election. After the election, the Italian Socialist Party, which had been a junior partner in the Christian Democracy-led regional government since 1970, switched sides and formed a coalition with the Communists. The new regional government, composed of Communists and Socialists, was led by a Socialist, Aldo Viglione. Piedmont was thus the first and only region of Northern Italy, along with neighbouring Liguria, to have a left-wing government.

== Results ==
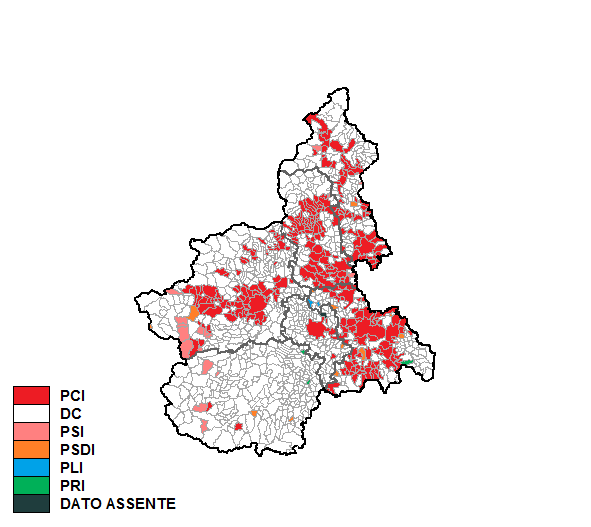
Largest party by municipality

Party	votes	votes (%)	seats
Italian Communist Party	1,033,342	33.9	22
Christian Democracy	976,794	32.1	20
Italian Socialist Party	393,707	12.9	8
Italian Democratic Socialist Party	224,642	7.4	4
Italian Liberal Party	153,079	5.0	2
Italian Social Movement	130,905	4.3	2
Italian Republican Party	109,333	3.6	2
Proletarian Democracy	24,634	0.8	-
Workers' Democracy	24,634	0.8	-
Popular Union for Socialism	1,128	0.0	-
Total	3,047,564	100.0	60

Source: Ministry of the Interior
