= Roberto Cota =

Italian politician (born 1968)

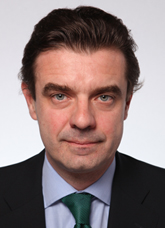

President of Piedmont
- In office 9 April 2010 – 9 June 2014
- Preceded by: Mercedes Bresso
- Succeeded by: Sergio Chiamparino

Member of the Chamber of Deputies
- In office 28 April 2006 – 17 June 2010
- In office 5 March 2013 – 9 April 2013
- Succeeded by: Stefano Allasia

President of the Regional Council of Piedmont
- In office 29 May 2000 – 17 February 2005
- Preceded by: Sergio Deorsola
- Succeeded by: Oreste Rossi

Personal details
- Born: 13 July 1968 (age 58) Novara, Italy
- Party: Lega Nord (1990-2020); Forza Italia (since 2020)
- Education: University of Milan
- Profession: Lawyer

Roberto Cota (born 13 July 1968 in Novara) is an Italian politician, President of Piedmont from 2010 to 2014.

After a degree in law, Cota joined the party in 1990. In 2000 he was elected to the Regional Council of Piedmont and was President of it until 2005. In 2001 he was elected regional secretary of Lega Nord Piemont.

After having served as Under-Secretary of Productive Activities in Berlusconi II Cabinet (since the end of December 2004) and later in Berlusconi III Cabinet, he was first elected to the Italian Chamber of Deputies in 2006. Re-elected in 2008, he was elected floor leader of Lega Nord in the Chamber.

On 30 March 2010 he was elected President of the Piedmont Region. On 17 June 2010 he resigned from Italian Chamber of Deputies.

His election as president of the Piedmont was canceled on 11 February 2014.
