= Enzo Ghigo =

Italian politician, former President of Piedmont

Enzo Ghigo OMRI
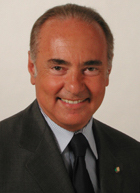

President of Piedmont
- In office 12 June 1995 – 27 April 2005
- Preceded by: Gian Paolo Brizio
- Succeeded by: Mercedes Bresso

Member of the Senate
- In office 28 April 2006 – 14 March 2013

Member of the Chamber of Deputies
- In office 15 April 1994 – 13 July 1995

Personal details
- Born: Enzo Giorgio Secondo Ghigo; 24 February 1953 (age 73) Turin, Italy
- Party: Forza Italia (1994-2009); PdL (2009-2013)
- Occupation: Politician

Enzo Ghigo (born 24 February 1953) is an Italian politician, former President of Piedmont from 1995 to 2005.

== Biography ==
A manager of the Publitalia-Fininvest group, whose owner was Silvio Berlusconi, Ghigo entered politics in December 1993, becoming the promoter of Forza Italia in Piedmont. Elected to the Chamber of Deputies in 1994, Ghigo was elected President of Piedmont in 1995, leading a center-right coalition.

In 2000, Ghigo was re-elected Governor, defeating The Olive Tree candidate Livia Turco, and remained at the head of his region until 2005, when, seeking a third term, he was defeated by The Union candidate Mercedes Bresso.

In 2006, Ghigo refused the offer to run for Mayor of Turin, and was instead elected Senator for Forza Italia in Piedmont and held his seat until 2013.

== Honours and awards ==
- Italy: Grand Cross Knight of the Order of Merit of the Italian Republic (28 May 2002)
- Italy: Grand Officer of the Order of Merit of the Italian Republic (27 December 1996)
