= Regional council (Italy) =

Elected legislative assembly in Italy

A regional council (Consiglio regionale) in Italy is the elected legislative assembly of a region of Italy. In Emilia-Romagna and Sicily, the legislative bodies are called the Legislative Assembly of Emilia-Romagna and the Sicilian Regional Assembly, officially nicknamed as Sicilian Parliament, respectively.

== Origins ==
The regional idea was born, in Italy, during the national Risorgimento and the first decades after the unification of Italy, but any proposal was rejected until the Second World War. After the collapse of fascism and the end of the war a violent independence movement that led to the institution of the region and the concession of the Statute, based on the model of federal states was born in Sicily. A similar route followed Friuli-Venezia Giulia, Sardinia, Trentino-Alto Adige/Südtirol and Valley of Aosta.

The other regions were instituted by the Constitution of 1948, but the first elections of regional councils were in 1970.

== Powers ==
Councils had the power to elect the president and other members (assessors) of regional government (Giunta Regionale). With the constitutional reforms of 1999 and 2001, they lost these powers (because the president is elected by the people and the assessors are appointed by the president). On the other hand, the regional councils obtained a lot of new legislative powers, including the regional electoral system, which had been decided by the State.

The Sicilian Assembly has the powers of a parliament, and its members have the same status of the national MPs and the European MEPs.

== Electoral system ==
Until the 1990s, all councils were elected with proportional representation. In order to prevent political instability, a new electoral law, called Legge Tatarella, was introduced for the ordinary regions in 1995, and gradually extended with little changes to the other regions. Now, the coalition of parties that receives the biggest number of votes obtains the absolute majority of the council's seats, and its leader is elected as the President of the region. In Aosta Valley the President is elected by the council. In Trentino- South Tirol, the council is the joint session of the two provincial councils, each one with its own electoral law.

== List ==
The 20 Italian regional councils are as follows:

- Regional Council of Aosta Valley
- Regional Council of Piedmont
- Regional Council of Lombardy
- Regional Council of Trentino-Alto Adige
- Regional Council of Veneto
- Regional Council of Friuli-Venezia Giulia
- Legislative Assembly of Emilia-Romagna
- Regional Council of Liguria
- Regional Council of Tuscany
- Legislative Assembly of Marche
- Legislative Assembly of Umbria
- Regional Council of Lazio
- Regional Council of Abruzzo
- Regional Council of Molise
- Regional Council of Campania
- Regional Council of Apulia
- Regional Council of Basilicata
- Regional Council of Calabria
- Sicilian Regional Assembly
- Regional Council of Sardinia
