= Mercedes Bresso =

Italian politician (born 1944)

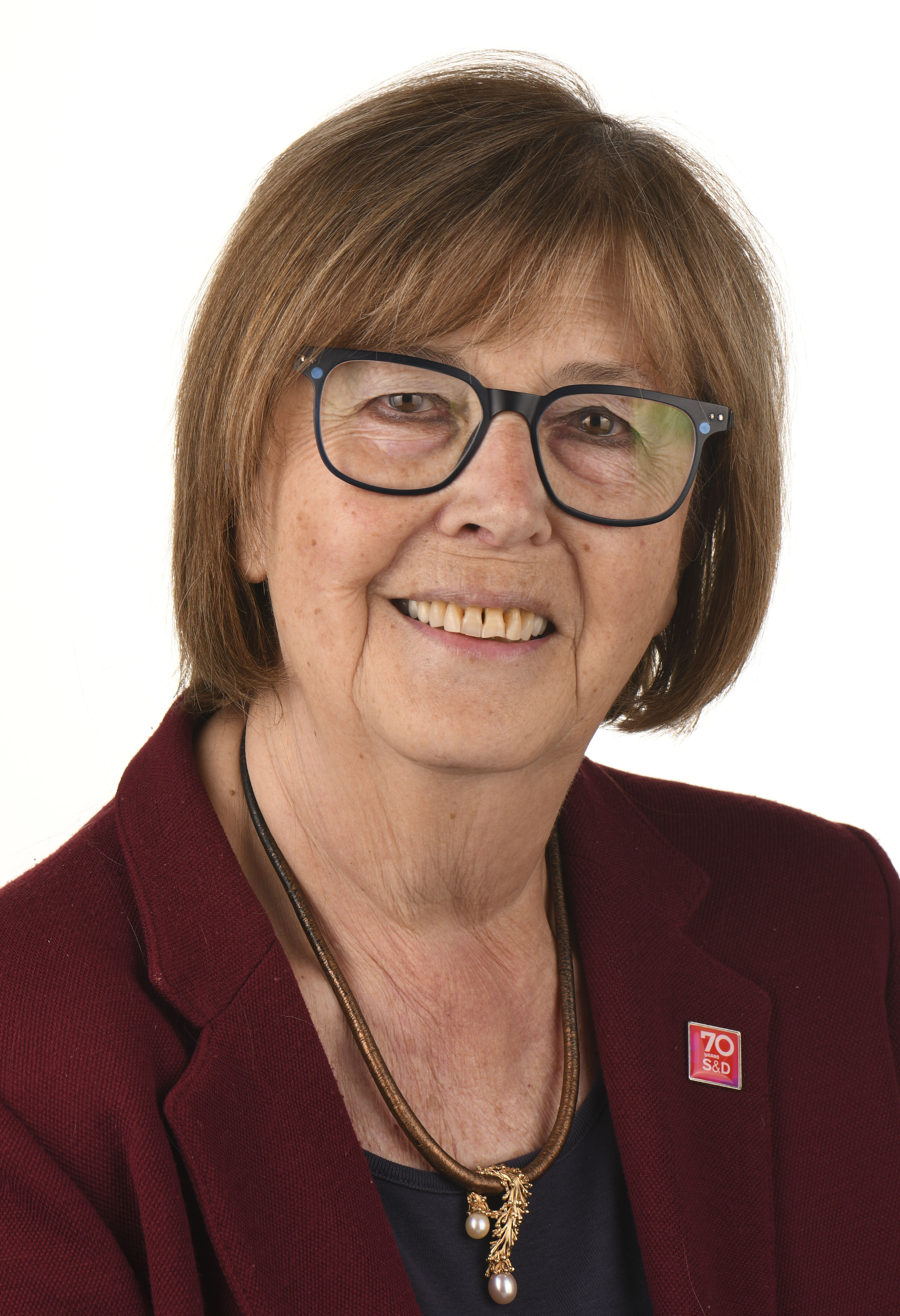

Member of the European Parliament
- In office 4 April 2023 – 15 July 2024
- Constituency: North-West Italy
- In office 1 July 2014 – 2 July 2019
- Constituency: North-West Italy
- In office 20 July 2004 – 24 May 2005
- Constituency: North-West Italy

President of Piedmont
- In office 27 April 2005 – 9 April 2010
- Preceded by: Enzo Ghigo
- Succeeded by: Roberto Cota

President of the Province of Turin
- In office 8 May 1995 – 14 June 2004
- Preceded by: Luigi Ricca
- Succeeded by: Antonino Saitta

Personal details
- Born: 12 July 1944 (age 82) Sanremo, Italy
- Party: Democratic Party
- Spouse: Claude Raffestin
- Education: University of Turin
- Profession: Economist

Mercedes Bresso (born 12 July 1944) is an Italian politician. A member of the Democratic Party, she served as Member of the European Parliament from 2014 until 2019 and again from 2023 following the departure of Pierfrancesco Majorino. She retained her seat in the 2024 European Parliament election and became the eldest serving MEP.

== Early life and career ==
Bresso was born in Sanremo, Province of Imperia, Liguria. In 1969, she received her degree in Economics; since 1973, she has been a university professor of economic institutions at the Politecnico di Torino (Faculty of Engineering).

== Political career ==
From 1989 onwards, Bresso was a member of the provincial, regional and national party executives of the Democrats of the Left. 1995–2004, she was the President of the Turin Province, and, a Member of the Regional Council (1985–1995) and of the Regional Executive (1994–1995) with responsibility for regional planning in Piedmont. She was a member of the Committee of the Regions and its Bureau from 1998–2004. Between 2005 and 2010, she was President of the Piedmont region.

Since 2002, she has been the Italian Vice-Chairperson of AICCRE; 2000–2004, she was Chairperson of the World Federation of United Cities, and, 2004–2005, founding Chairperson of the Organisation Cités et Gouvernements locaux Unis.

Between March 2005 and October 2008, she was President of the Union of European Federalists (UEF).

=== President of the Committee of Region, 2010–2012 ===
In February 2010, Bresso was elected the first female president of the European Committee of the Regions. She stood down at the end of April 2010, after being defeated on her home turf of Piedmont in her country's regional elections. Shortly after, Claudio Burlando, the president of Liguria and a fellow member of Italy's centre-left Democratic Party, gave up his seat on the Committee of Regions so that Bresso could have it.

=== Member of the European Parliament, 2014–2019 ===
Bresso became a Member of the European Parliament following the 2014 European elections. A member of the Progressive Alliance of Socialists and Democrats group, she served on the Committee on Regional Development and on the Committee on Constitutional Affairs, where she was her parliamentary group's coordinator. In November 2014, Bresso and Elmar Brok were appointed by the committee to explore the possibilities of the eurozone governance reform without any treaty change.

In addition to her committee assignments, Bresso was a member of the parliament's delegation for relations with Switzerland and Norway and to the EU-Iceland Joint Parliamentary Committee and the European Economic Area (EEA) Joint Parliamentary Committee. She chaired the European Parliament Intergroup on Rural, Mountainous and Remote Areas (RUMRA). She was also a member of the Intergroup on Integrity (Transparency, Anti-Corruption and Organized Crime).

== Other activities ==
- European Movement International, Member of the Honorary Council

== See also ==
- 2004 European Parliament election in Italy
