= Overlapping circles grid =

Geometric pattern used in art

Example overlapping round circle figures
Square circle grid
1+
4
9
Centered square lattice forms
5
13
Triangular circle grid
1+
3
4
7
19

An overlapping circles grid is a geometric pattern of repeating, overlapping circles of an equal radius in two-dimensional space. Commonly, designs are based on circles centered on triangles (with the simple, two circle form named vesica piscis) or on the square lattice pattern of points.

Patterns of seven overlapping circles appear in historical artefacts from the 7th century BCE onward; they become a frequently used ornament in the Roman Empire period, and survive into medieval artistic traditions both in Islamic art (girih decorations) and in Gothic art. The name Flower of Life is given to the overlapping circles pattern in New Age publications.

Of special interest is the hexafoil or six-petal rosette derived from the seven overlapping circles pattern, also known as the Sun of the Alps from its frequent use in alpine folk art in the 17th and 18th century.

== Triangular grid of overlapping circles ==
This pattern can be extended indefinitely, seen here with hexagonal rings of 1, 7, 19, 37, 61, and 91 circles

The triangular lattice form, with circle radii equal to their separation is called a seven overlapping circles grid. It contains six circles intersecting at a point, with a seventh circle centered on that intersection.

Overlapping circles with similar geometrical constructions have been used infrequently in various of the decorative arts since ancient times. The pattern has found a wide range of usage in popular culture, in fashion, jewelry, tattoos and decorative products.

=== Cultural significance ===
==== Near East ====
The oldest known occurrence of the overlapping circles pattern is dated to the 7th or 6th century BCE, found on the threshold of the palace of Assyrian king Aššur-bāni-apli in Dur Šarrukin (now in the Louvre).

The design became more widespread in the early centuries of the Common Era. One early example is a set of 5 patterns of 19 overlapping circles drawn on the granite columns at the Temple of Osiris in Abydos, Egypt, and a further five on a column opposite the building. They are drawn in red ochre and some are very faint and difficult to distinguish. The patterns are graffiti, and not found in natively Egyptian ornaments. They are mostly dated to the early centuries CE although medieval or even modern (early 20th century) origin cannot be ruled out with certainty, as the drawings are not mentioned in the extensive listings of graffiti at the temple compiled by Margaret Murray in 1904.

Similar patterns were sometimes used in England as apotropaic marks to keep witches from entering buildings. Consecration crosses indicating points in churches anointed with holy water during a church's dedication also take the form of overlapping circles.

A girih pattern that can be drawn with straightedge and compass

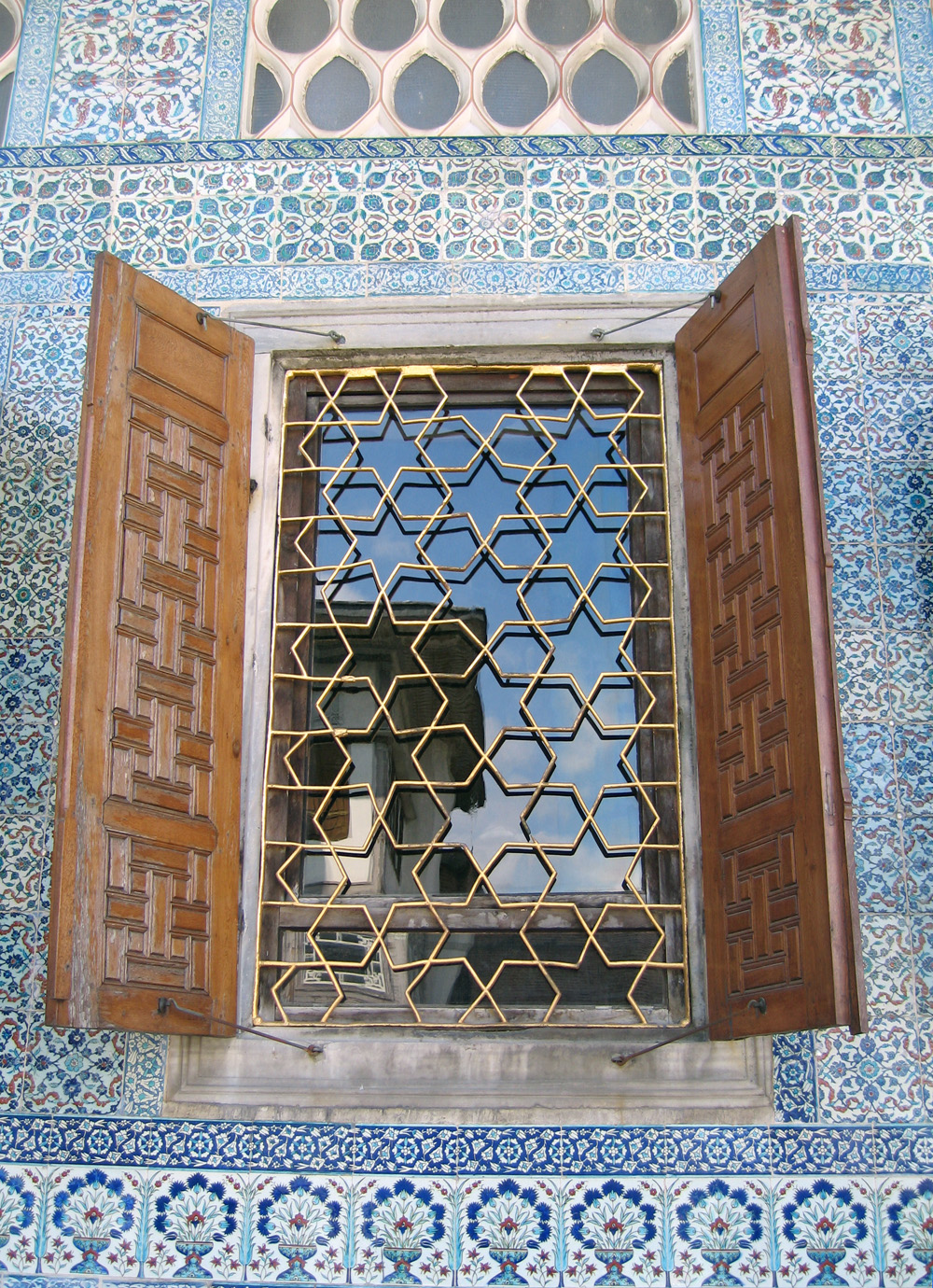
Window cage at Topkapı Palace, using pattern

In Islamic art, the pattern is one of several arrangements of circles (others being used for fourfold or fivefold designs) used to construct grids for Islamic geometric patterns. It is used to design patterns with 6- and 12-pointed stars as well as hexagons in the style called girih. The resulting patterns however characteristically conceal the construction grid, presenting instead a design of interlaced strapwork.

==== Europe ====
Patterns of seven overlapping circles are found on Roman mosaics, for example at Herod's Palace in the 1st century BCE. The design is found on one of the silver plaques of the Late Roman hoard of Kaiseraugst (discovered 1961). It is later found as an ornament in Gothic architecture, and still later in European folk art of the early modern period. High medieval examples include the Cosmati pavements in Westminster Abbey (13th century). Leonardo da Vinci explicitly discussed the mathematical proportions of the design.

==== Modern usage ====
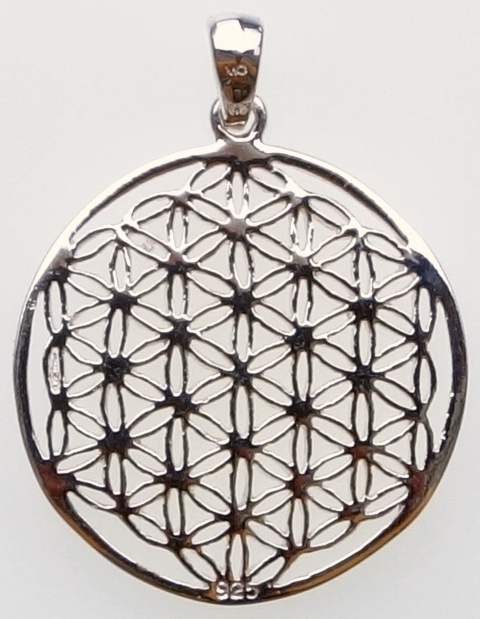
19-circle with arcs: 27 mm-wide (1.1 in) silver pendant (2013)

The name Flower of Life is modern, associated with the New Age movement, and commonly attributed specifically to Drunvalo Melchizedek in his book The Ancient Secret of the Flower of Life (1999).

The pattern and modern name have propagated into wide range of usage in popular culture, in fashion, jewelry, tattoos, and decorative products. The pattern in quilting has been called the diamond wedding ring or triangle wedding ring to contrast it from the square pattern. Besides occasional use in fashion, it is also used in the decorative arts. For example, the album Sempiternal (2013) by Bring Me the Horizon uses the 61 overlapping circles grid as the main feature of its album cover, and the album A Head Full of Dreams (2015) by Coldplay features the 19 overlapping circles grid as the central part of its album cover. Teaser posters illustrating the cover art to A Head Full of Dreams were widely displayed on the London Underground in the last week of October 2015.

The Sun of the Alps (Italian: Sole delle Alpi) symbol has been used as the emblem of Padanian nationalism in northern Italy since the 1990s. It resembles a pattern often found in that area on buildings.

A seven-circle Flower of Life is also used in the coat of arms of Asgardia the space nation.

==== Gallery ====
===== 1, 7, and 19-circle hexagonal variants =====
In the examples below the pattern has a hexagonal outline, and is further circumscribed.

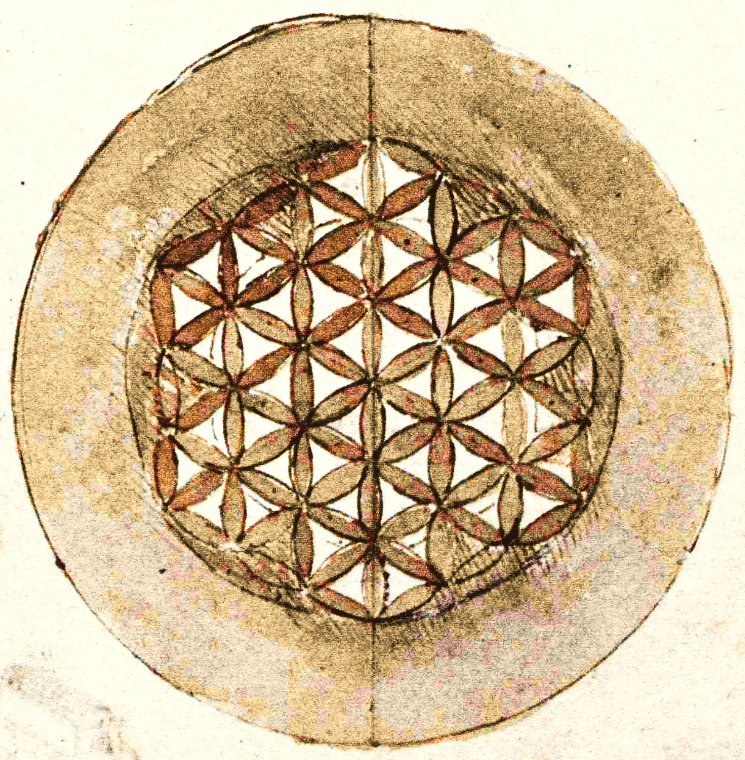
Drawing in Leonardo da Vinci's Codex Atlanticus, between 1478 and 1519

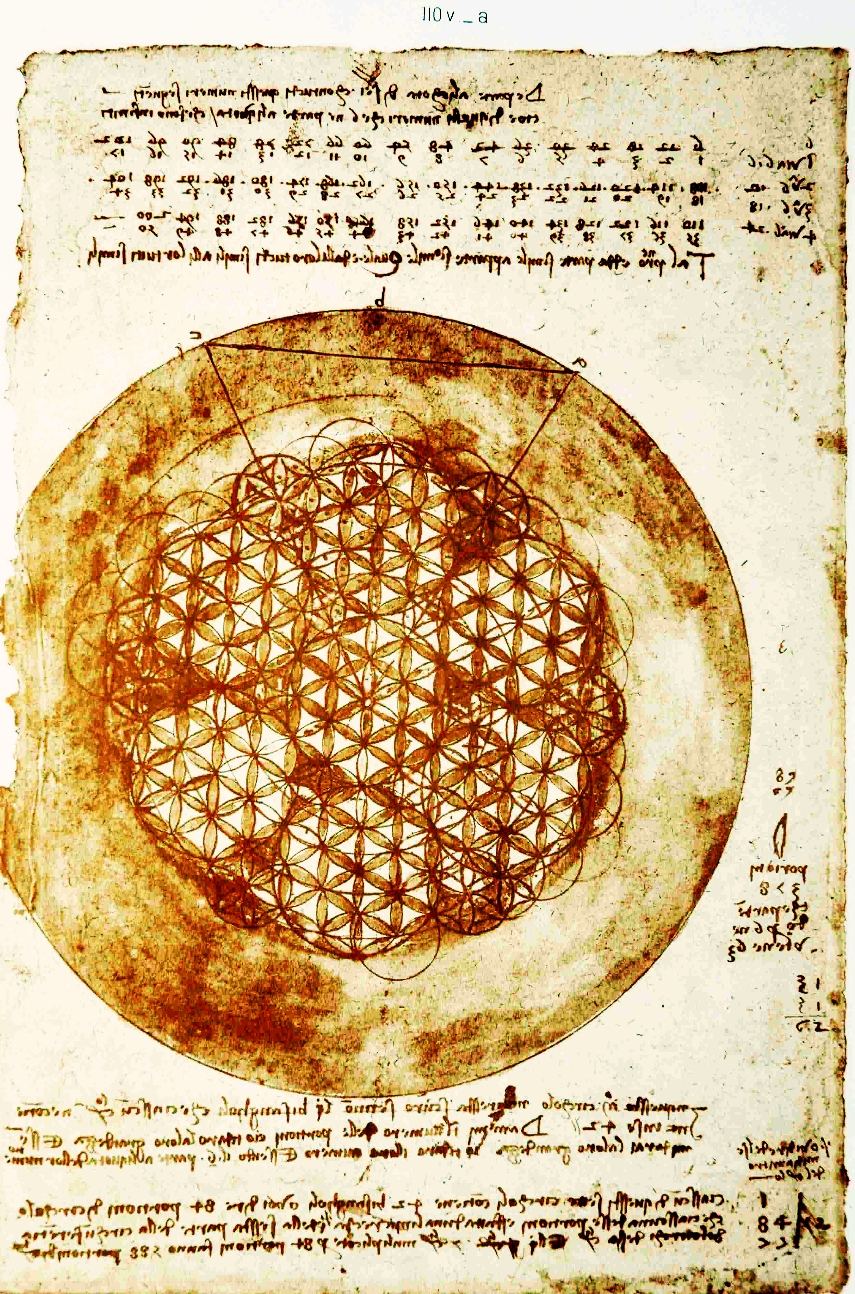
Drawing by Leonardo da Vinci (Codex Atlanticus, fol. 307v)

1-circle with completed arcs

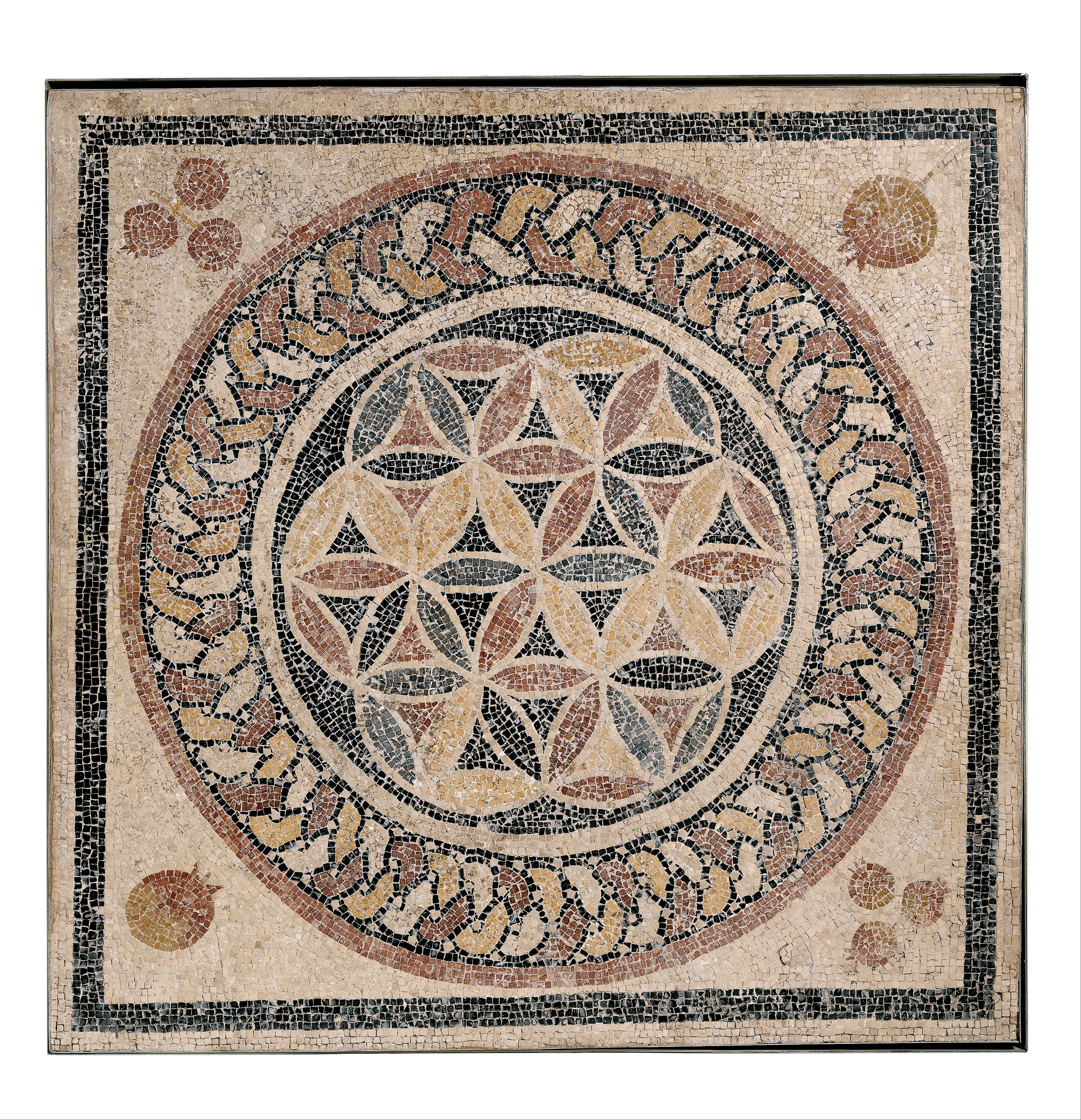
7-circle mosaic floor from a bathhouse in Herod's Palace, 1st century BCE

19-circle symbol with completed arcs and bounded by a larger circle

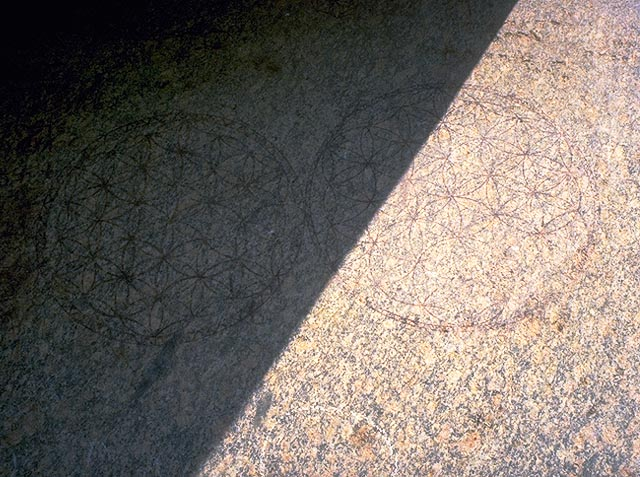
Two 19-circle symbols drawn in red ochre at the Temple of Osiris in Abydos, Egypt

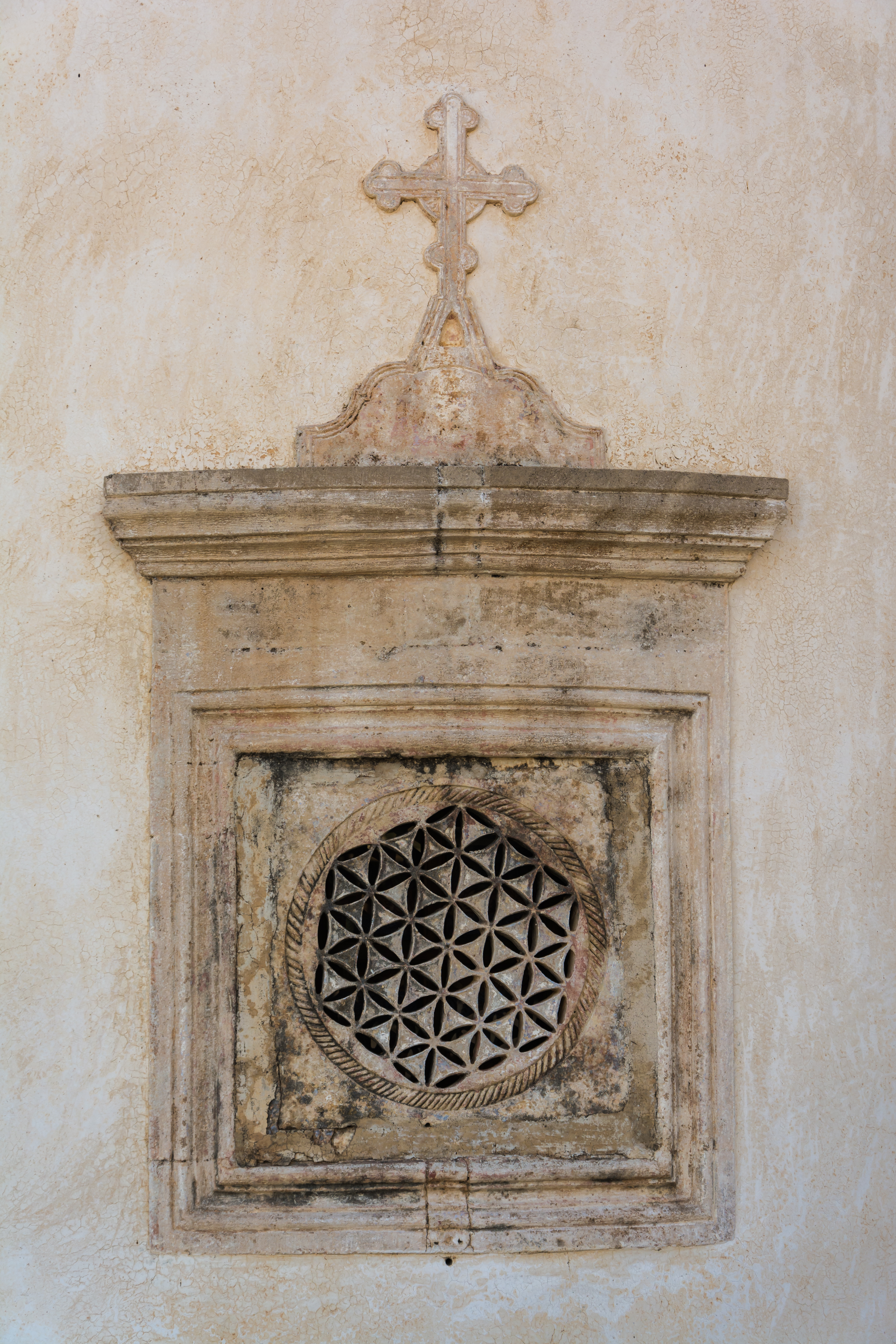
19-circle window at the southern apsis of the church of Preveli Monastery (Moni Preveli), Crete

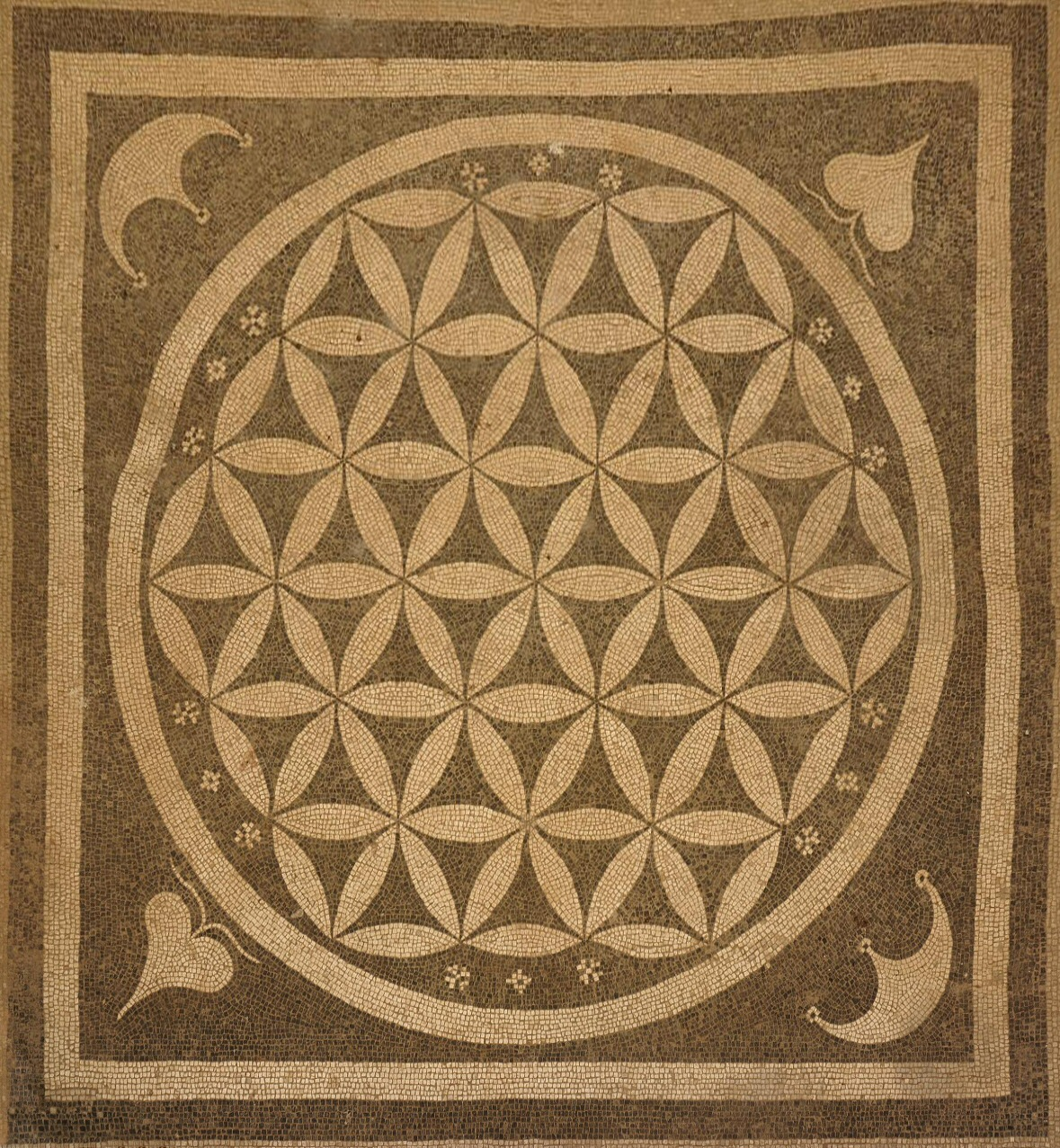
19-circle pattern from Ephesus, Turkey

===== Similar patterns =====
In the examples below, the pattern does not have a hexagonal outline:

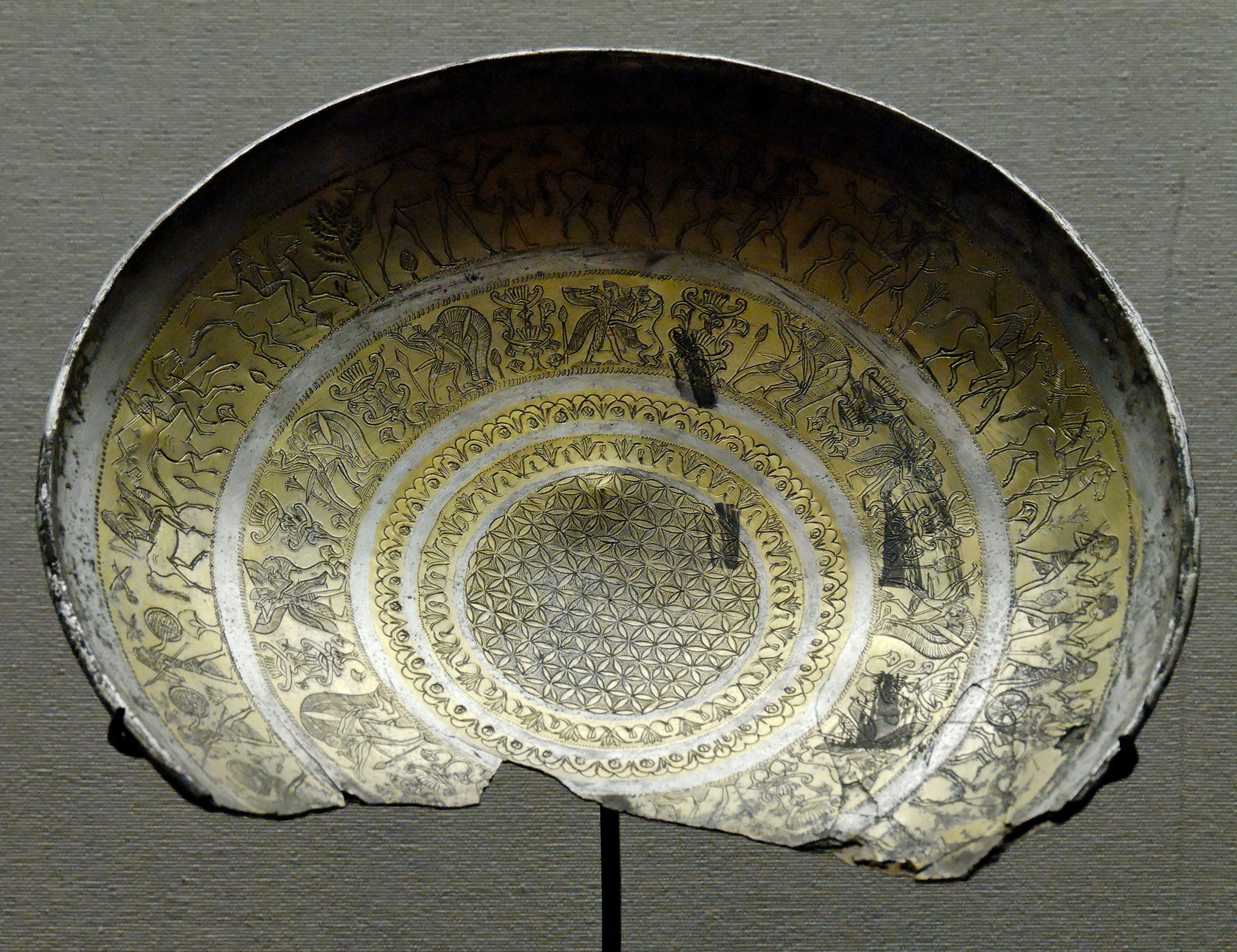
Cup with mythical scenes, a sphinx frieze, and a king defeating his enemies. From the Cypro-Archaic I period (8th–7th centuries BCE) of Idalion, Cyprus.

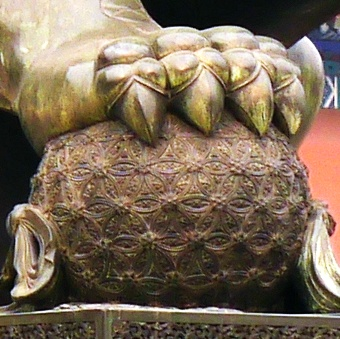
Ball held by the male Guardian Lion at the Gate of Supreme Harmony, Forbidden City, Beijing, China, showing the pattern on its surface

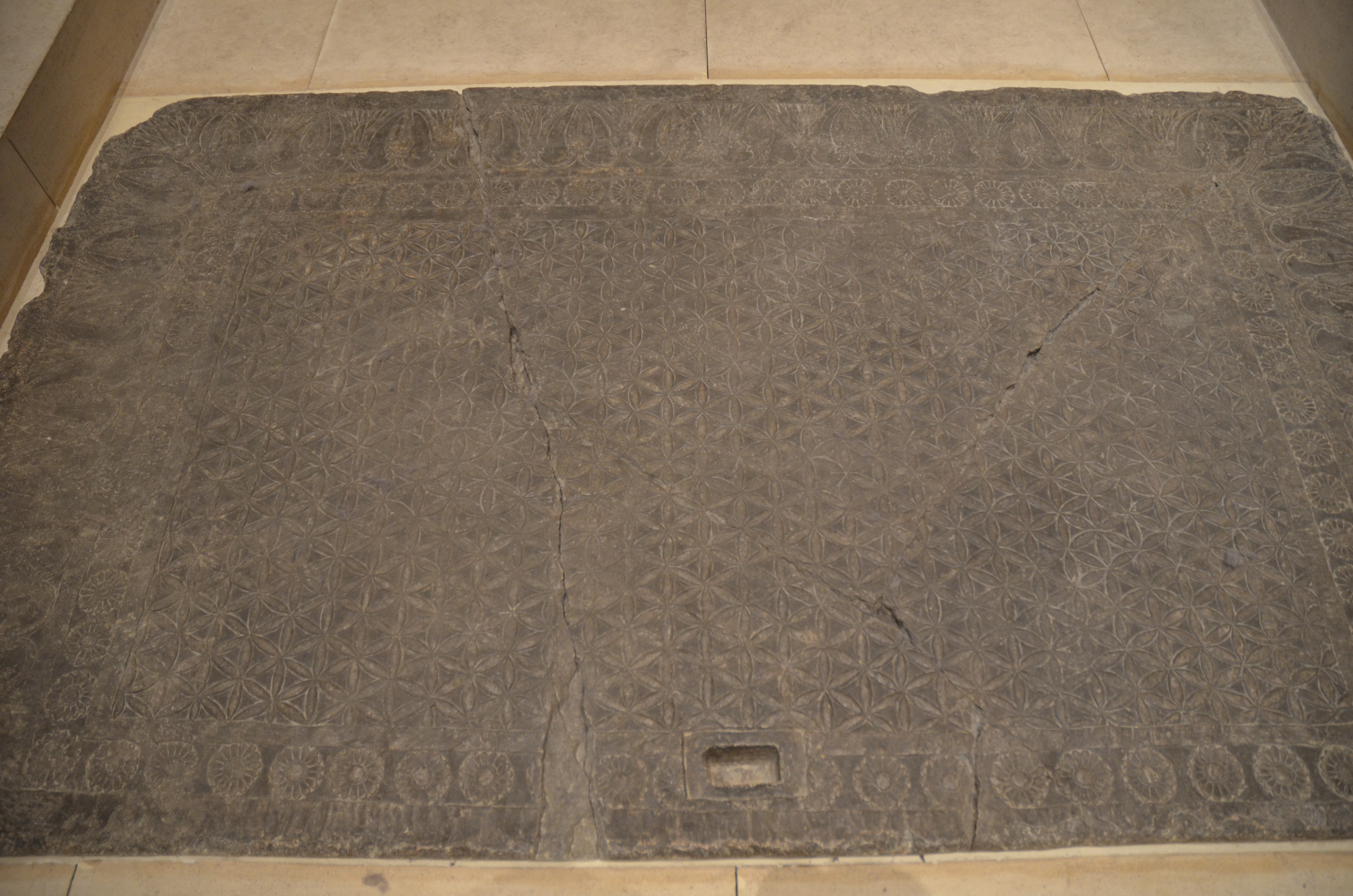
Floor decoration from the northern Iraq palace of King Ashurbanipal, visible at the Louvre Museum, dated 645 BCE

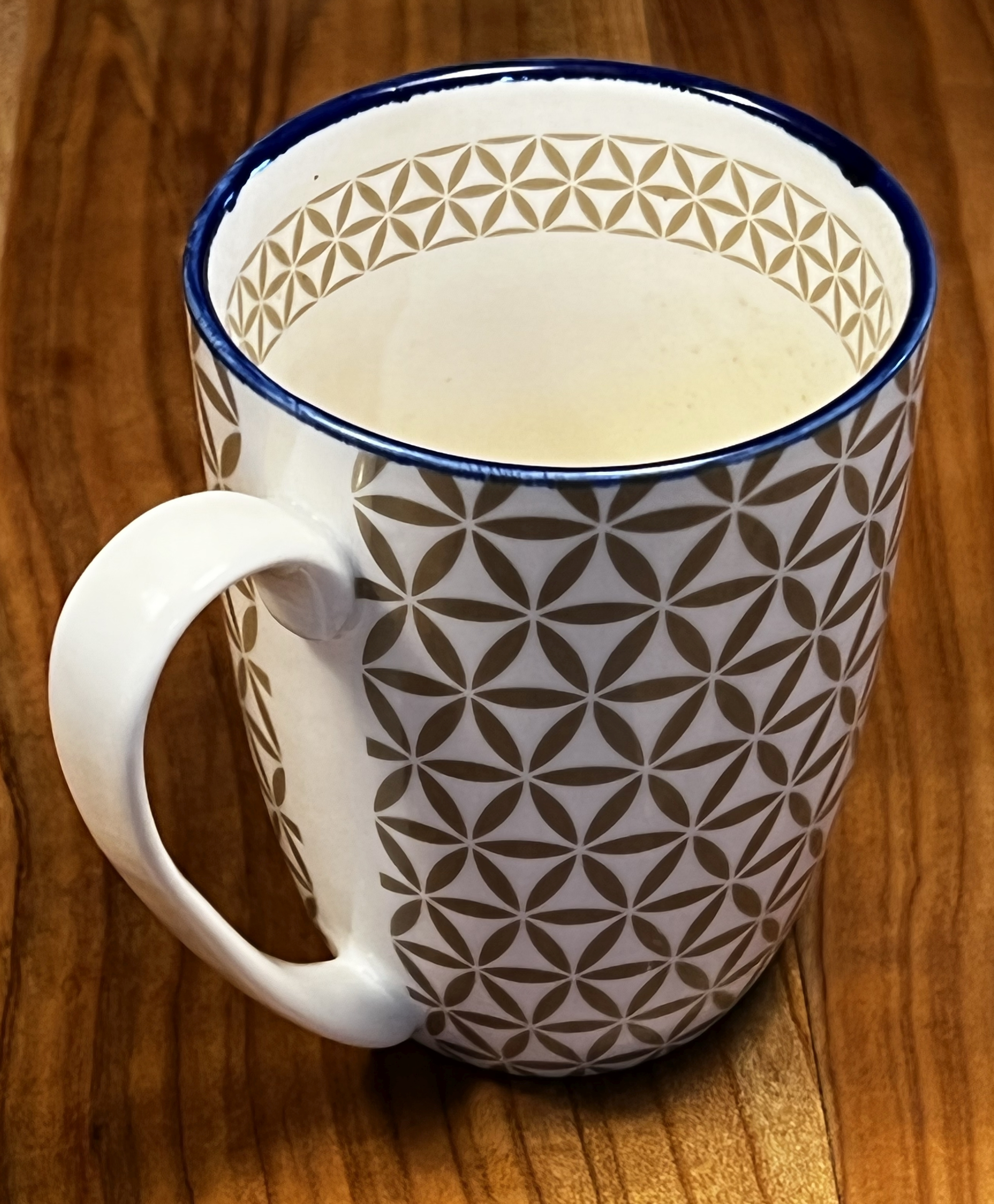
Coffee cup (Germany, 2022)

Sun of the Alps emblem used by the Lega Nord

=== Construction ===
Martha Bartfeld, author of geometric art tutorial books, described her independent discovery of the design in 1968. Her original definition said, "This design consists of circles having a 1-[inch; 25 mm] radius, with each point of intersection serving as a new center. The design can be expanded ad infinitum depending upon the number of times the odd-numbered points are marked off."

The figure can be drawn by pen and compass, by creating multiple series of interlinking circles of the same diameter touching the previous circle's center. The second circle is centered at any point on the first circle. All following circles are centered on the intersection of two other circles.

==== Progressions ====
The pattern can be extended outward in concentric hexagonal rings of circles, as in the following table. The first row shows rings of circles. The second row shows cubes of stacked spheres in isometric projections. The third row shows the pattern completed with partial circle arcs within a set of completed circles.

Expanding sets have 1, 7, 19, 37, 61, 91, 127 circles, and continuing ever larger hexagonal rings of circles. The number of circles is $n^3-(n-1)^3=3n^2-3n+1=3n(n-1)+1$, where n is the number of rings, forming the centered hexagonal numbers.

These overlapping circles can also be seen as a projection of an n-unit cube of spheres in 3-dimensional space, viewed on the diagonal axis. There are more spheres than circles because some are overlapping in 2 dimensions.

Rosette figures including partial circles
1-circle	7-circle (8 − 1)	19-circle (27 − 8)	37-circle (64 − 27)	61-circle (125 − 64)	91-circle (216 − 125)	127-circle (343 − 216)
1-sphere (1×1×1)	8-sphere (2×2×2)	27-sphere (3×3×3)	64-sphere (4×4×4)	125-sphere (5×5×5)	216-sphere (6×6×6)	343-sphere (7×7×7)
+12 arcs	+24 arcs	+36 arcs	+48 arcs	+60 arcs	+72 arcs	+84 arcs

=== Other variations ===
Another triangular lattice form is common, with circle separation as the square root of 3 times their radius. Richard Kershner showed in 1939 that no arrangement of circles can cover the plane more efficiently than this hexagonal lattice arrangement.

Two offset copies of this circle pattern makes a rhombic tiling pattern, while three copies make the original triangular pattern.

A 19-circle example, the minimal covering circle pattern

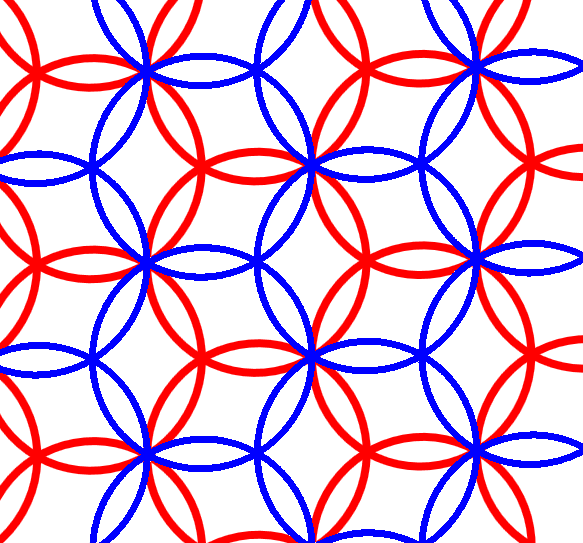
Two offset copies of the pattern (left) make a rhombic tiling pattern

Three offset copies of the pattern (leftmost image) make the seven-circle pattern

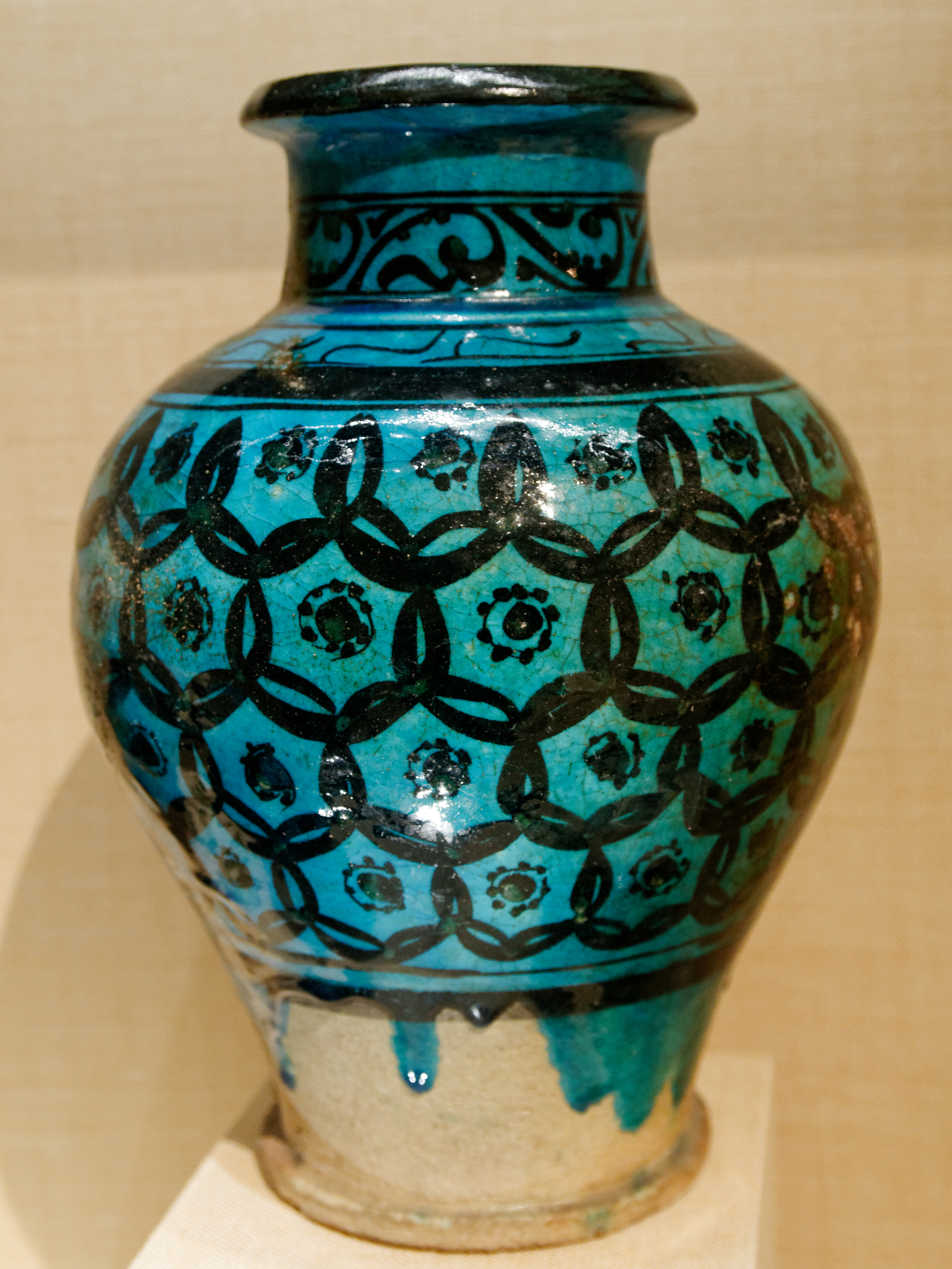
Example on an Ayyubid-era Raqqa ware stoneware glazed jar, Syria, 12th or 13th century

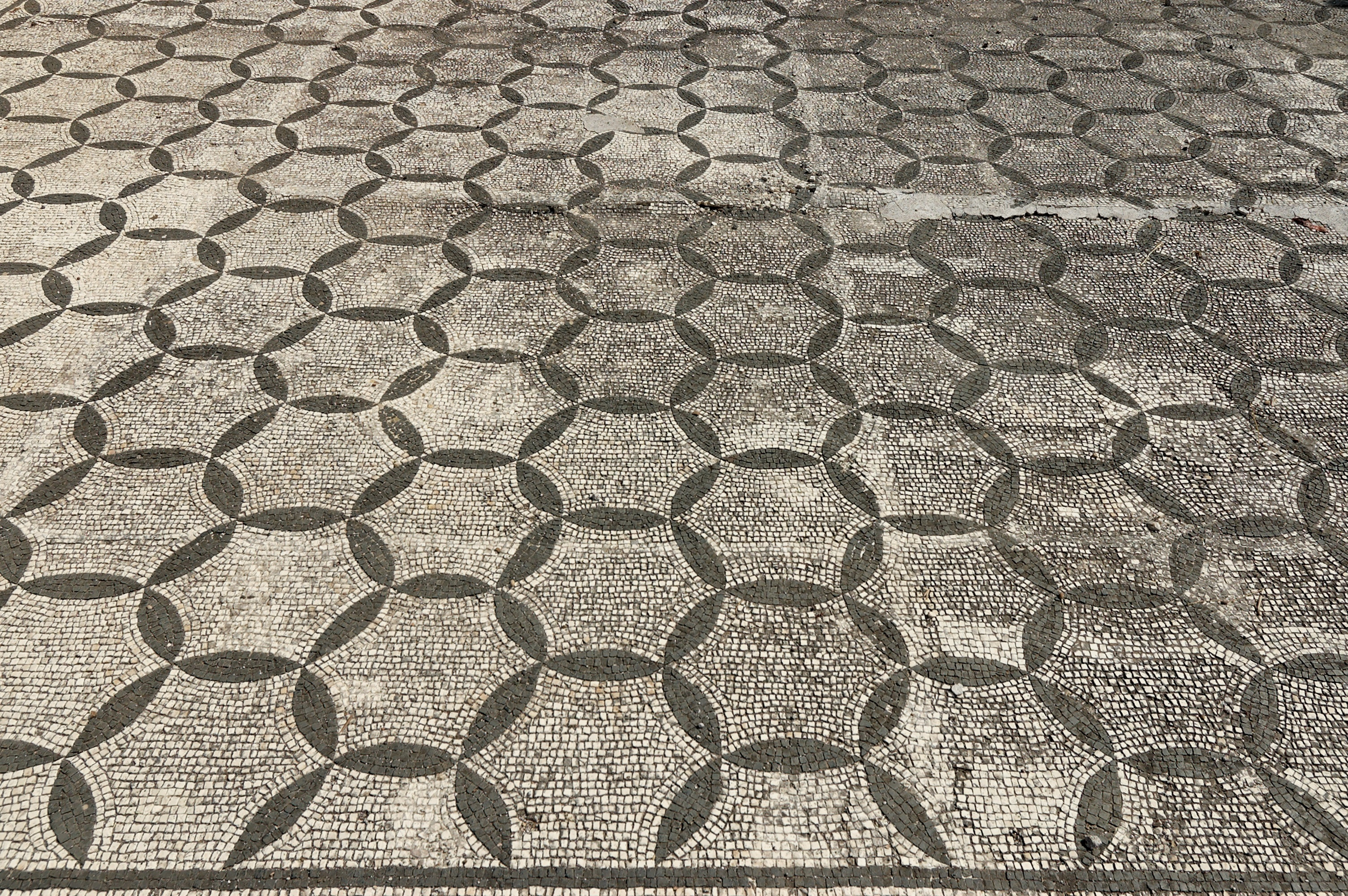
Black and white mosaic pavement at Hadrian's Villa, Tivoli, 2nd century CE

=== Related concepts ===
The center lens of the two-circle figure is called a vesica piscis, from the mathematician Euclid. Two circles are also called Villarceau circles as a plane intersection of a torus. The area inside one circle and outside the other is called a lune.

The three-circle figure resembles the Borromean rings and is also used in the three-set variant of Venn diagrams. The combined path of the intersections forms a unicursal path called a triquetra. The center of the three-circle figure is called a Reuleaux triangle.

Vesica piscis	Borromean rings	Venn diagram	Triquetra	Reuleaux triangle

Some spherical polyhedra with edges along great circles can be stereographically projected onto the plane as overlapping circles.

Polyhedra in stereographic projection
Octahedron	Cuboctahedron	Icosidodecahedron

The seven-circle pattern has also been called an Islamic seven-circles pattern for its use in Islamic art.

== Square grid of overlapping circles ==
Square lattice form
Each circle's radius is the reciprocal of the square root of twice the distance between their centers	A quilt design called a double wedding ring pattern

Centered square lattice form
It can be visualized as two half-offset square grids of tangent circles	Egyptian design, from Owen Jones's The Grammar of Ornament (1856)

The square lattice form can be seen with circles that line up horizontally and vertically, while intersecting on their diagonals. The pattern appears slightly different when rotated on its diagonal, also called a centered square lattice form because it can be seen as two square lattices with each centered on the gaps of the other.

It is called a Kawung motif in Indonesian batik, and is found on the walls of the 8th-century Hindu temple Prambanan in Java.

It is called an Apsamikkum from ancient Mesopotamian mathematics.

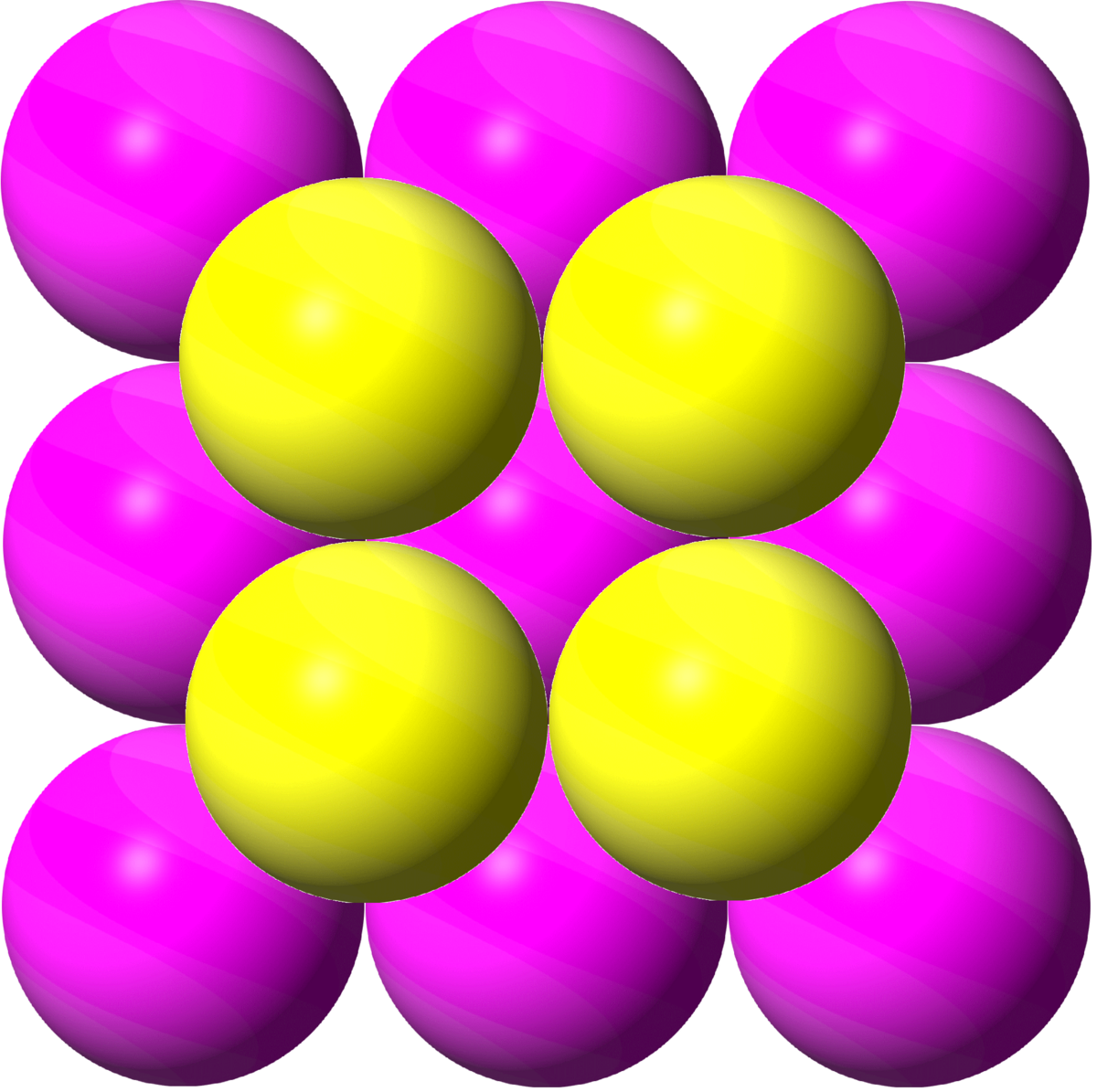
The square grid can be seen in a face-centered cubic lattice, with 12 spheres in contact around every sphere

The related five overlapping circles grid is constructed by from two sets of overlapping circles half-offset

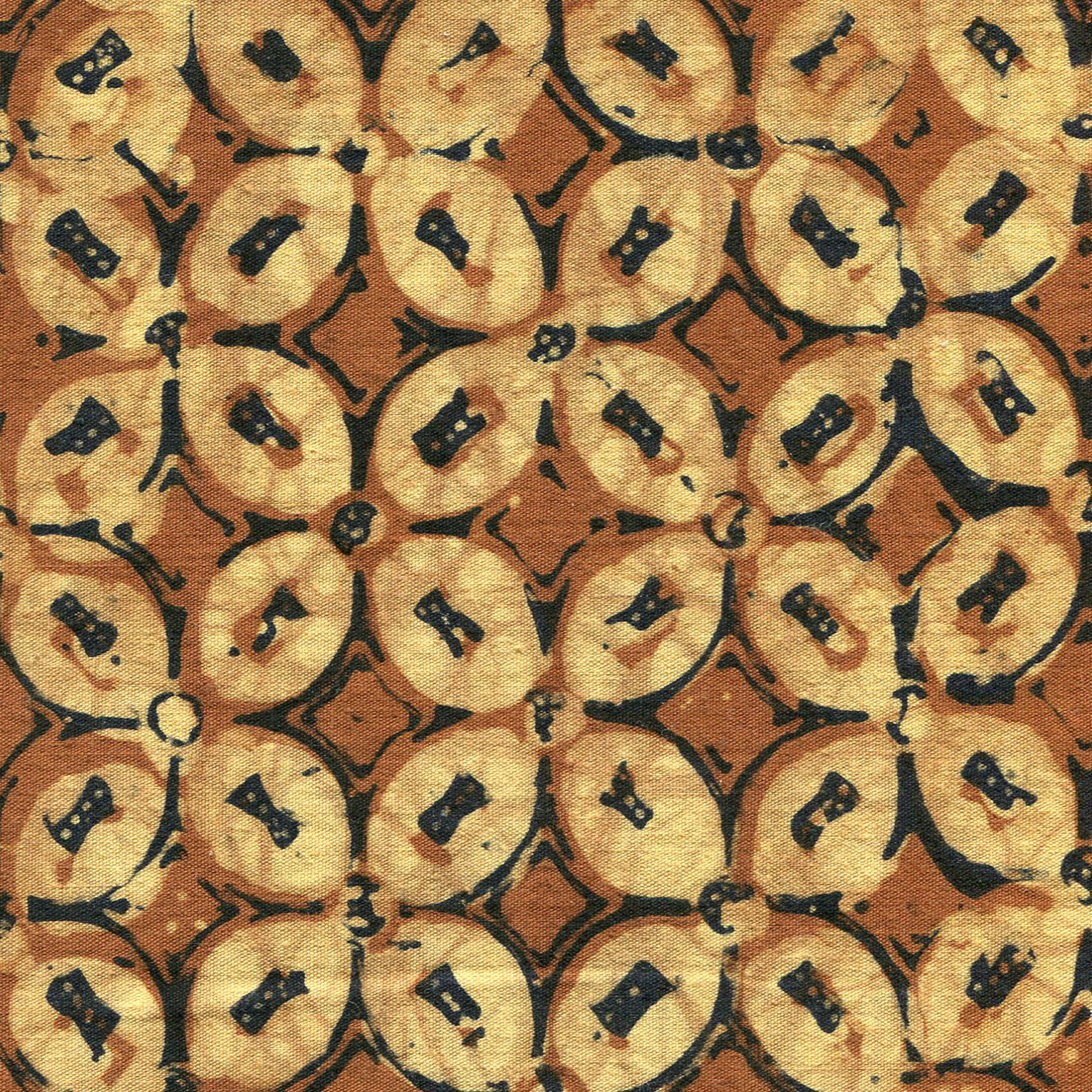
Kawung or Coffee Bean Batik pattern on a sarong (detail), Java, Indonesia

== See also ==
- Knot theory
- Uniform tiling symmetry mutations – pattern mutations in 3D space
