= Hexafoil =

Ornamental pattern in works of art

A geometrical hexafoil

The hexafoil is a design with six-fold dihedral symmetry composed from six vesica piscis lenses arranged radially around a central point, often shown enclosed in a circumference of another six lenses. It is also sometimes known as a "daisy wheel". A second, quite different, design is also sometimes referred to by this name; see alternate symbol.

The design is found as a rosette ornament in artwork dating back to at least the Late Bronze Age.

== Construction ==
The seven overlapping circles grid forms a triangular lattice, seen here with hexagonal rings of 1, 7, 19, 37, 61 and 91 circles.

The pattern figure can be drawn by pen and compass, by creating seven interlinking circles of the same diameter touching the previous circle's center. The second circle is centered at any point on the first circle. All following circles are centered on the intersection of two other circles.

The design is sometimes expanded into a regular overlapping circles grid. Bartfeld (2005) describes the construction: "This design consists of circles having a 1-[inch] radius, with each point of intersection serving as a new center. The design can be expanded ad infinitum depending upon the number of times the odd-numbered points are marked off."

== Usage ==
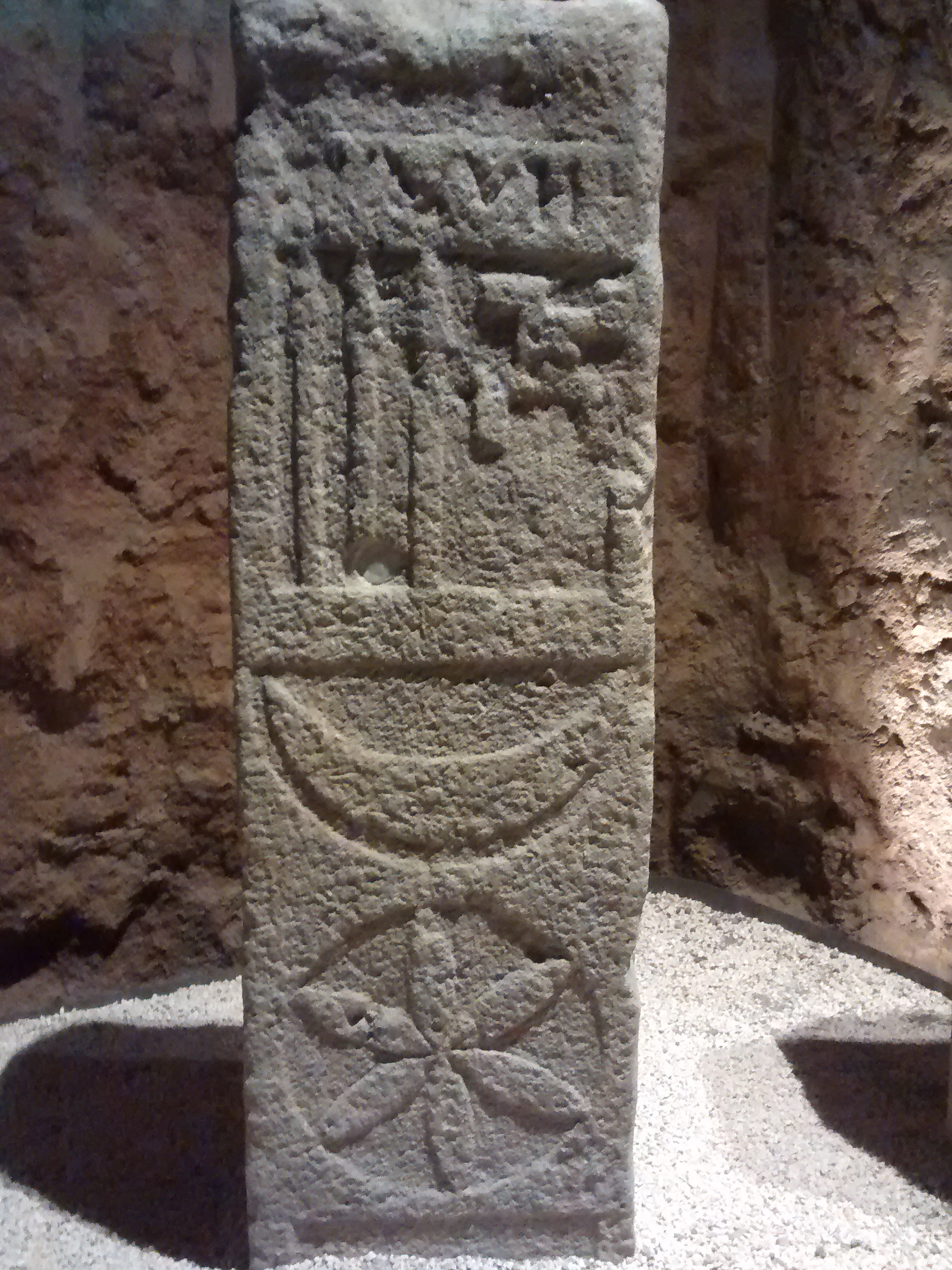
Iberian funerary stele of Badalona, Spain (1st century BC)

The hexafoil has been very widely used throughout European folk art for a very long period of time. It is attested from at least the beginning of the Late Bronze Age, represented, for example, on ornamental golden disks found in Shaft Grave III at Mycenae (16th century BC). It is also found in some Cantabrian stelae, dated to the Iron Age, as well as Norwegian bronze kettles from the same period

The six-petal rosette is common in 17th to 20th century folk art throughout Europe.

In Portugal, it is common to find it in medieval churches and cathedrals, as the engraved signature of a mason; but also as decoration and symbol of protection on the chimneys of old houses in Alentejo (at times together with the lauburu, or with the pentagram).

In Galicia (Spain) and all the Cantabrian Mountains, hexafoils are found since the Iron Age in torc terminals and decoration, and is still used in folk art.

It can also be found in the Pyrenees (Navarre, Aragon, and Catalonia). Since 2003 the hexafoil is being used as the logo of the Alt Pirineu Natural Park, the largest of Catalonia.

In the United Kingdom the hexafoil is commonly found on churches, but also in barns and private buildings, as well as on cross slabs. The use of the hexafoil as a folk magic symbol was brought from the United Kingdom to Australia by settlers, where six leaf designs with concentric circles have been found in homes and occasionally in public buildings to serve as a sign of protection.

The hexafoil was also widely used on gravestones in Colonial America, especially popular in parts of Connecticut, Massachusetts, and Pennsylvania. The design was commonly used from the later 17th century until the early 19th century.

The design is also known as "Sun of the Alps" (Sole delle Alpi) in Italy from its widespread use in alpine folk art. It resembles a pattern often found in that area on buildings. It is used in the coat of arms of Lecco Province. It has also been used as the emblem of Padanian nationalism in northern Italy since the 1990s. In 2001, Editoriale Nord, the publishing company of La Padania, registered the green-on-white design as a trademark.

In Norway it can mostly be found on wooden objects, such as beer bowls, clothes smoothing boards, milk butts, wooden chests, beds, and so on, but it can also be found on the doors of buildings. In Norwegian it's sometimes known as "Olavsrose" (rose of Olaf), although that name is used for another symbol as well.

In Lithuania the hexafoil was found on wooden beer bowls, spindles, and other wooden objects. It is known as "little sun" (saulute) in Lithuanian.

In Slovakia, southeastern Poland and western Ukraine, the mark was commonly carved on roof beams inside peasant huts. In Ukraine it was known as "the symbol of Perun" (Peruna znak) and "the thunder mark" (gromovoi znak).

In the Russian North the hexafoil was carved near the outside roof of peasant houses to protect them against lightning. The symbol was known as the thunder sign (gromovoi znak) or the thunder wheel (gromovoe koleso), and was associated with the thunder god Perun.

=== Gallery ===
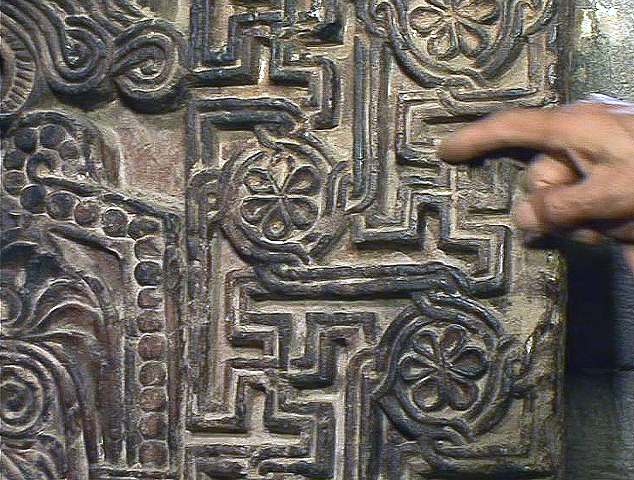
Khachkar with hexafoils, swastikas and sauwastikas in Sanahin, Armenia

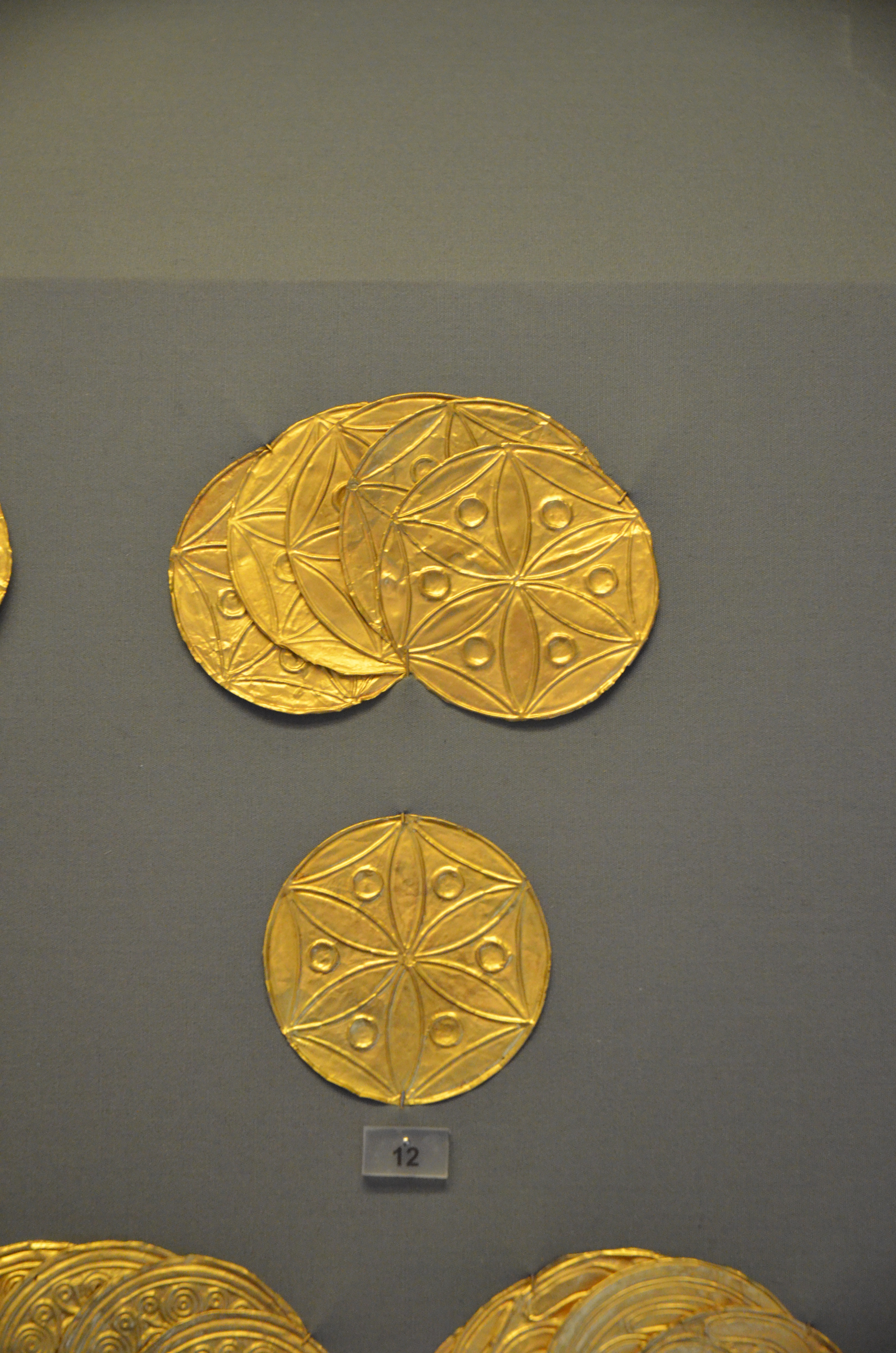
Ornamented gold disks from Shaft Grave III at Mycenae (16th century BC), (Archaeological Museum, Istanbul)

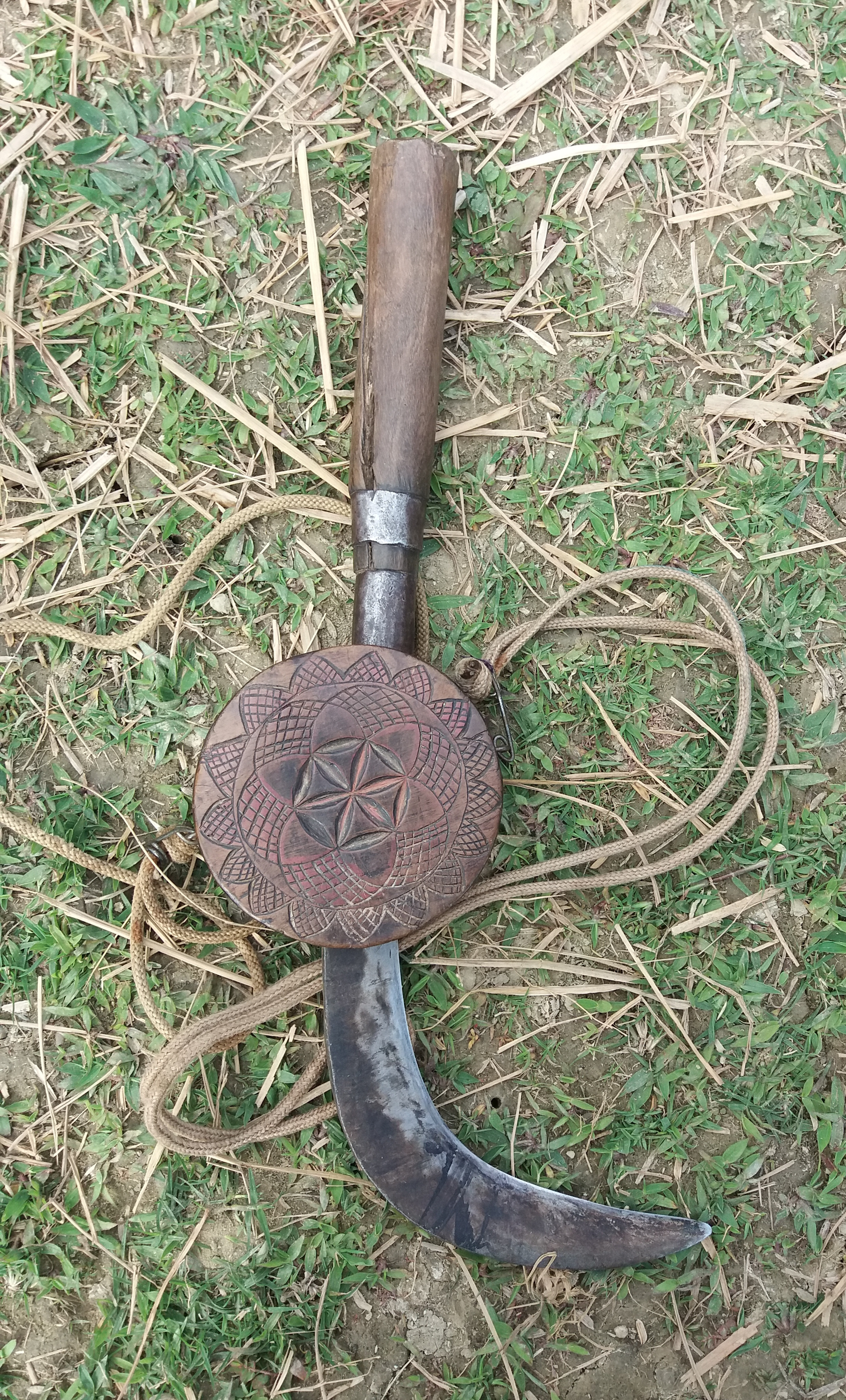
Nepali sicle (hasiya) with its carrier (khurpeto) carved with the Aryan Star/Flower of Life symbol

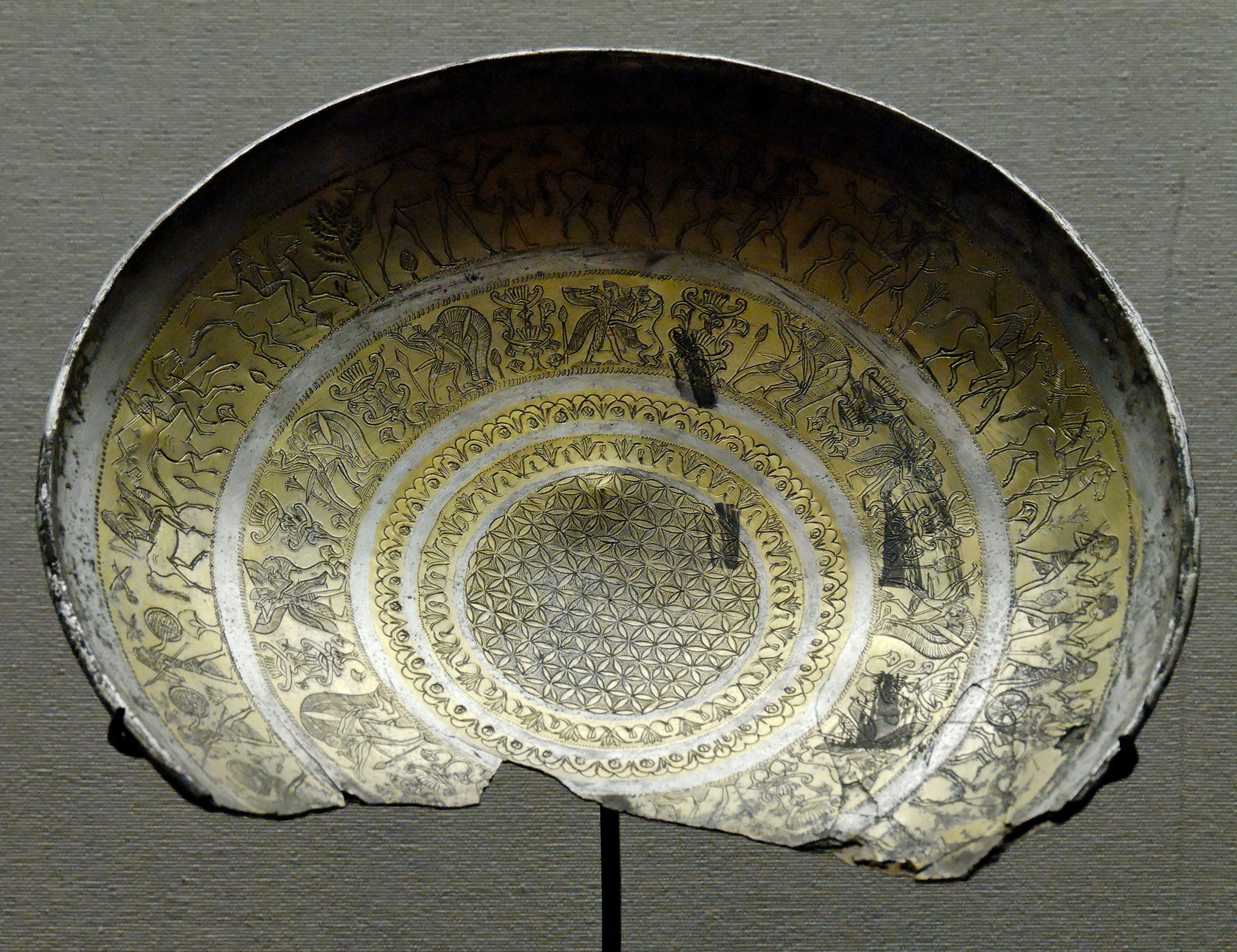
Cup with Flower of Life motif from Idalion, Cyprus, 8th-7th century BCE (Museum of Louvre, Paris)

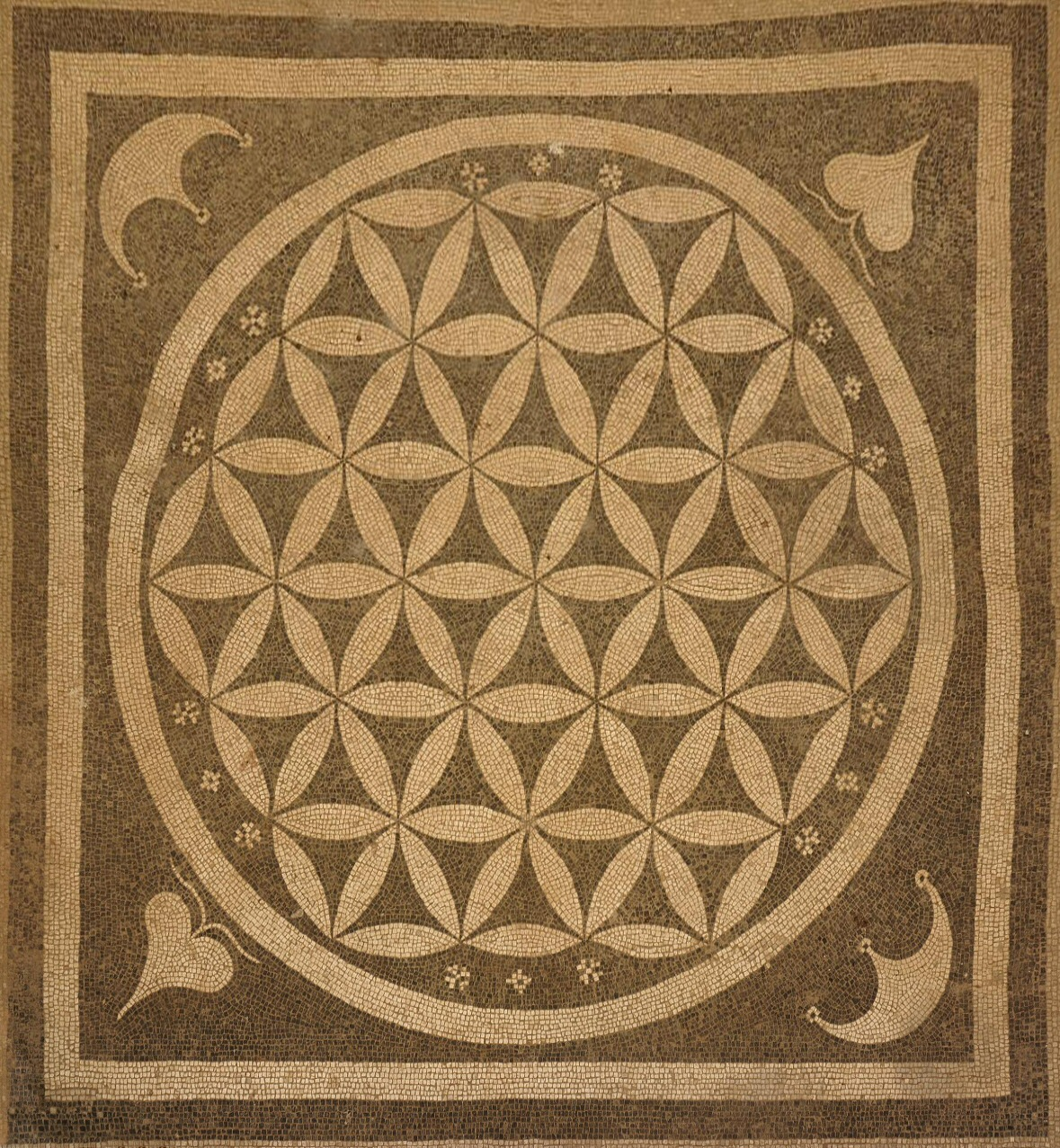
Flower of Life on a mosaic from Apaša (Ephesos)

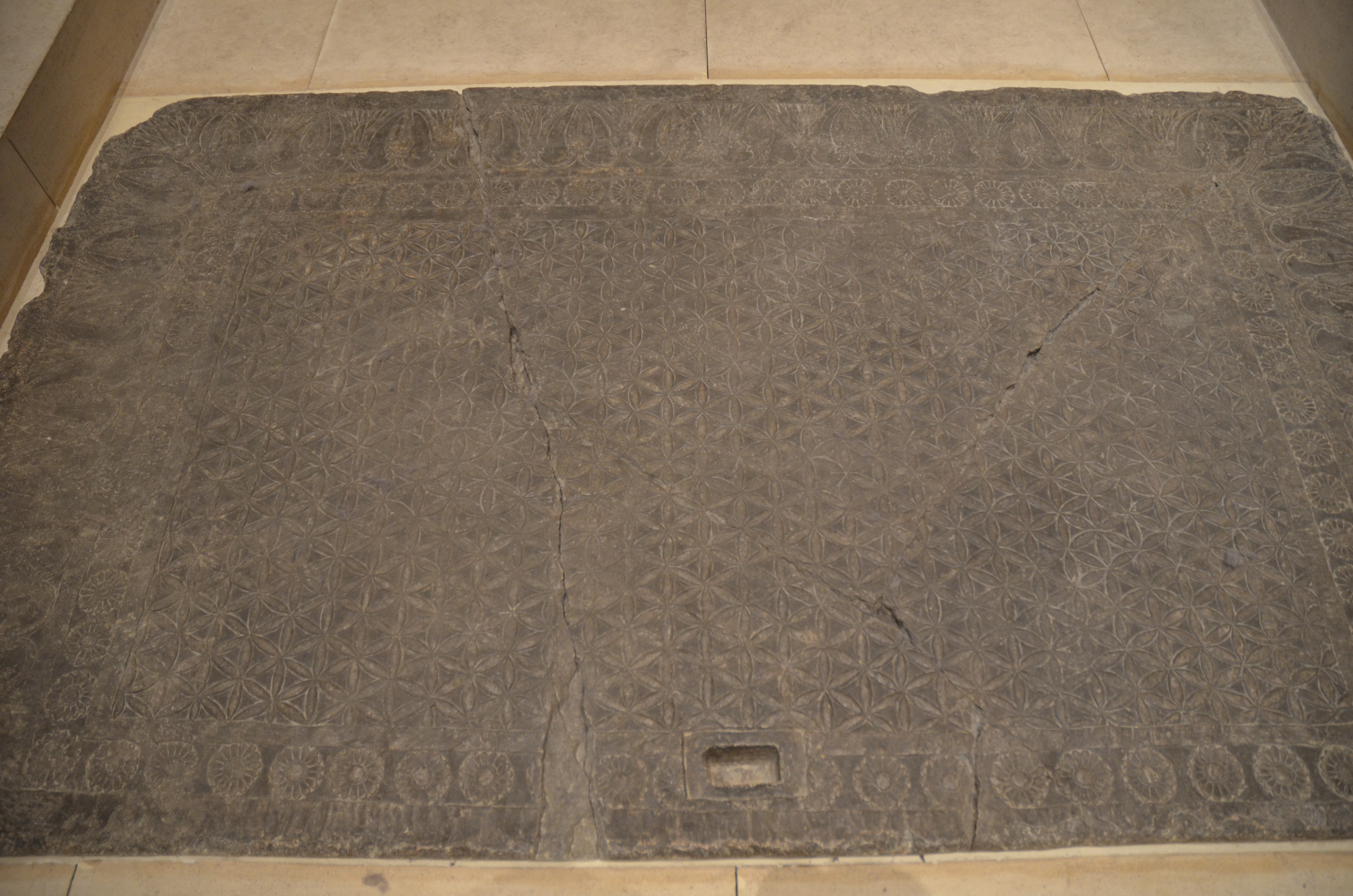
Floor decoration from the palace of King Ashurbanipal, Northern Iraq, 645 BCE (Museum of Louvre, Paris)

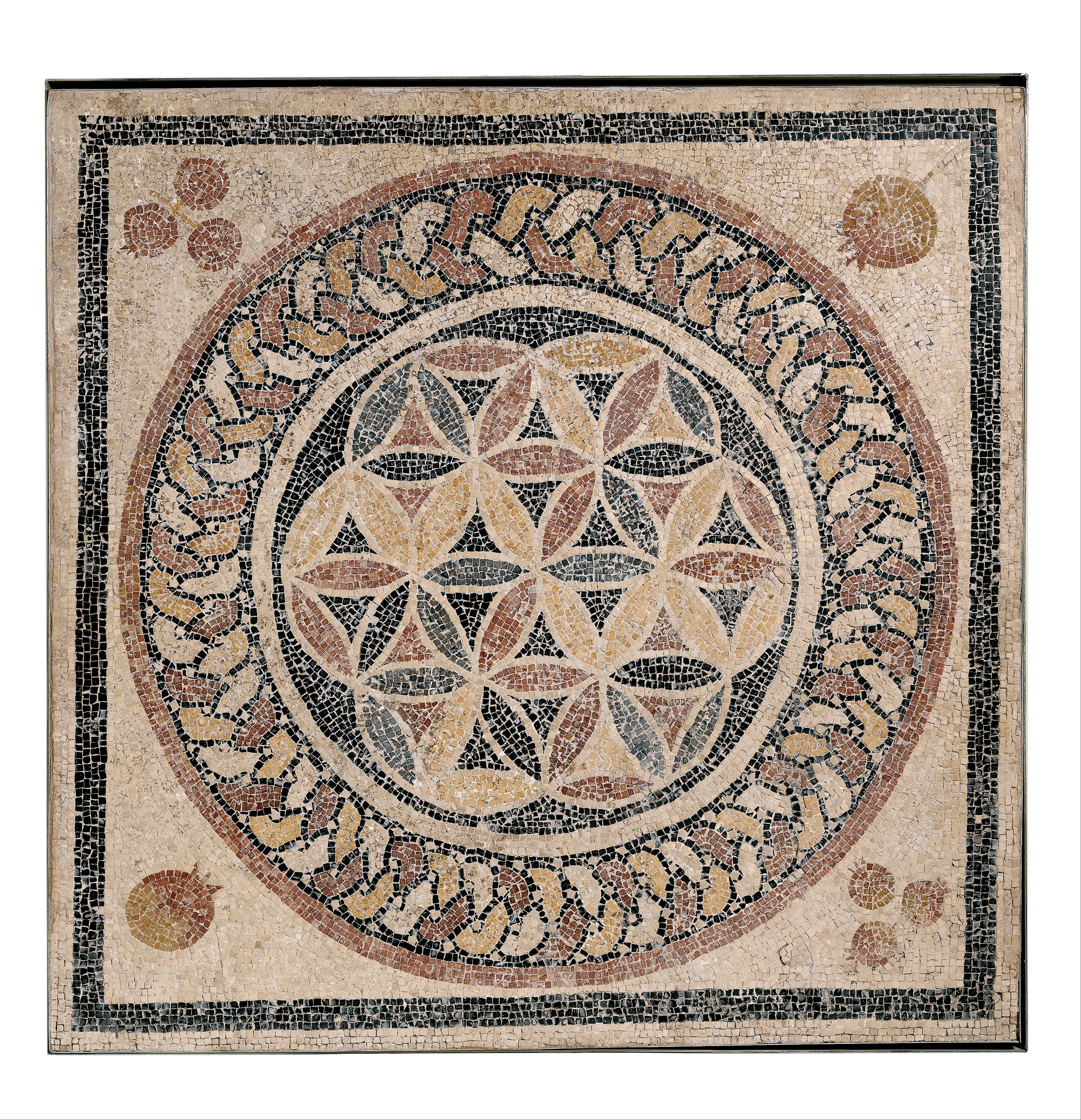
Mosaic floor from a bathhouse in Herodium, West Bank, Palestine, 1st century BCE

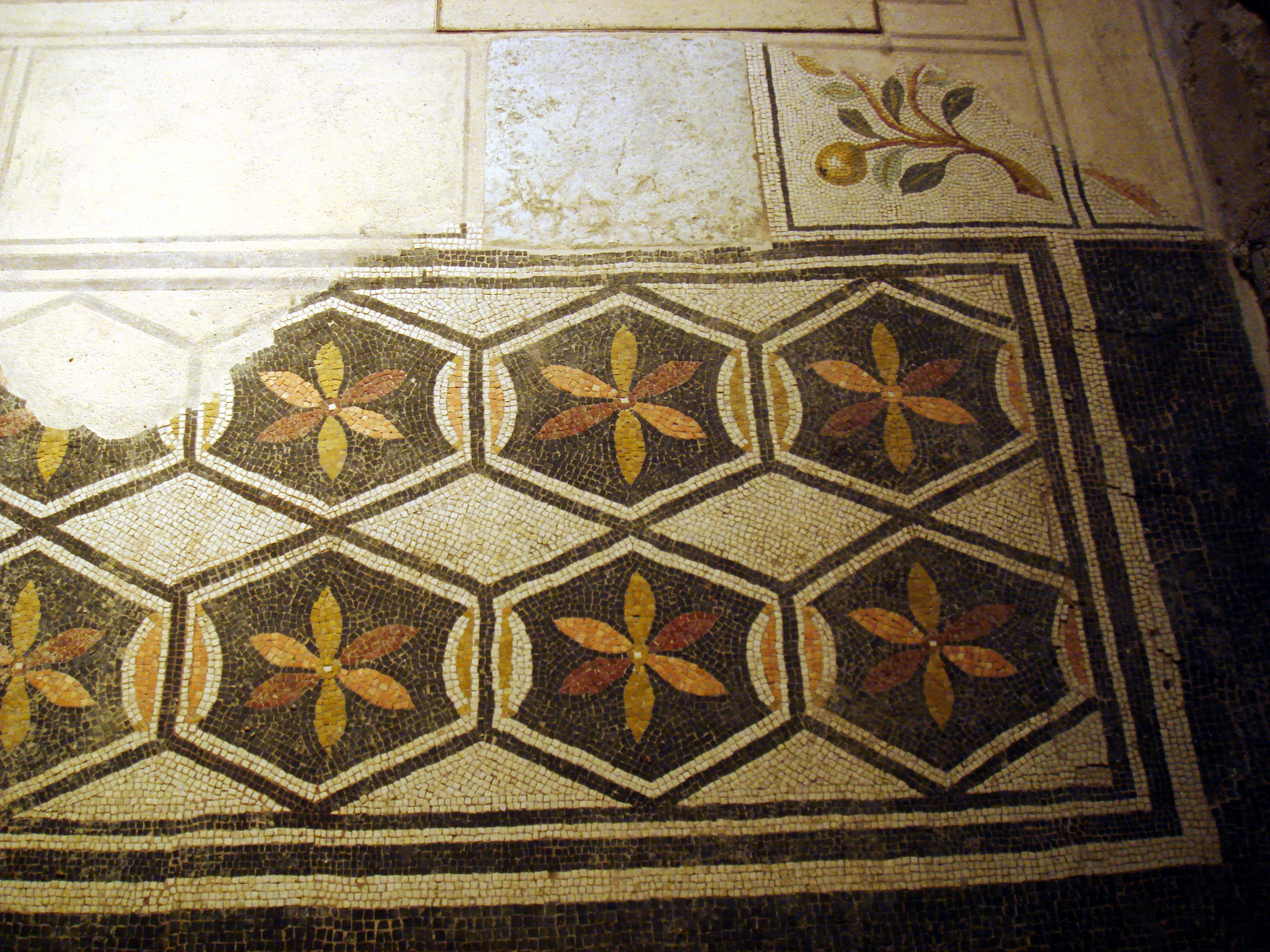
Roman-era mosaic, Domus dell'Ortaglia, Brescia, Italy 2nd century CE

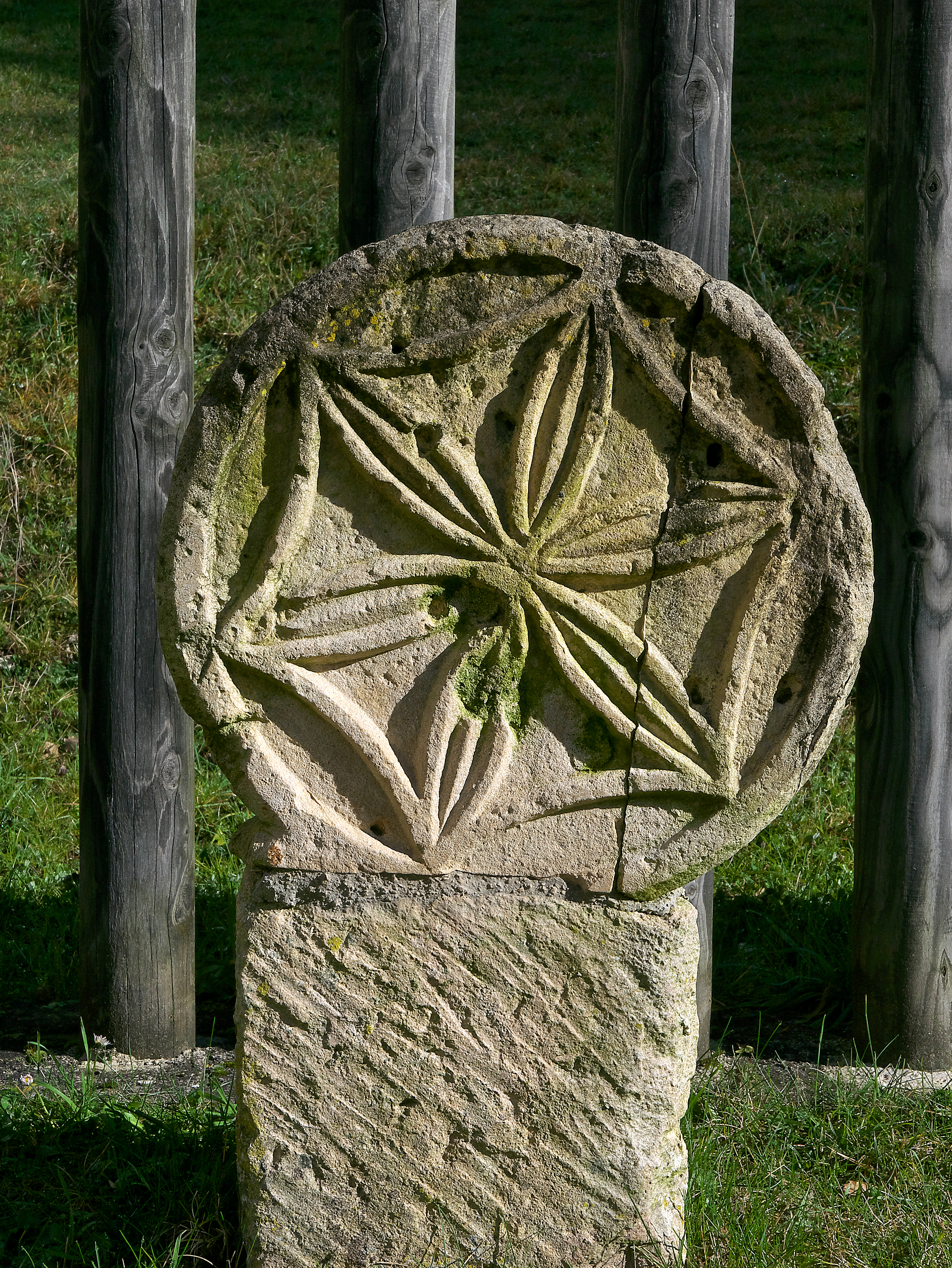
Cantabrian stele at the Monastery of Iranzu, Navarre, Spain

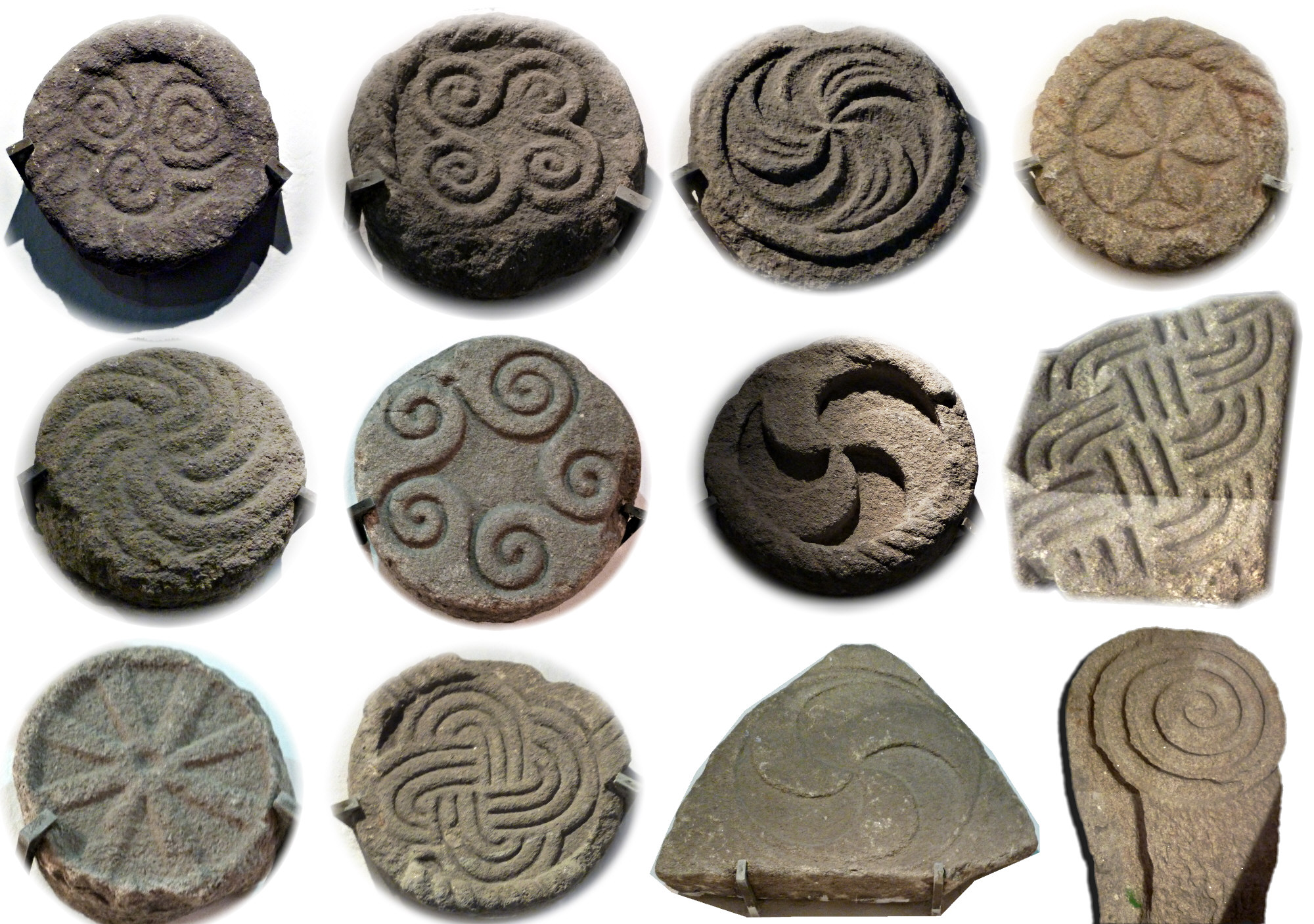
Selection of carvings from the hillfort of Santa Trega, Galicia, Spain (La Tène period, c. 1st century BC)

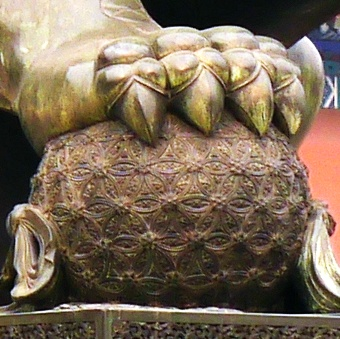
Detail of an Imperial Guardian Lion at the Gate of Supreme Harmony, Forbidden City, Beijing, China

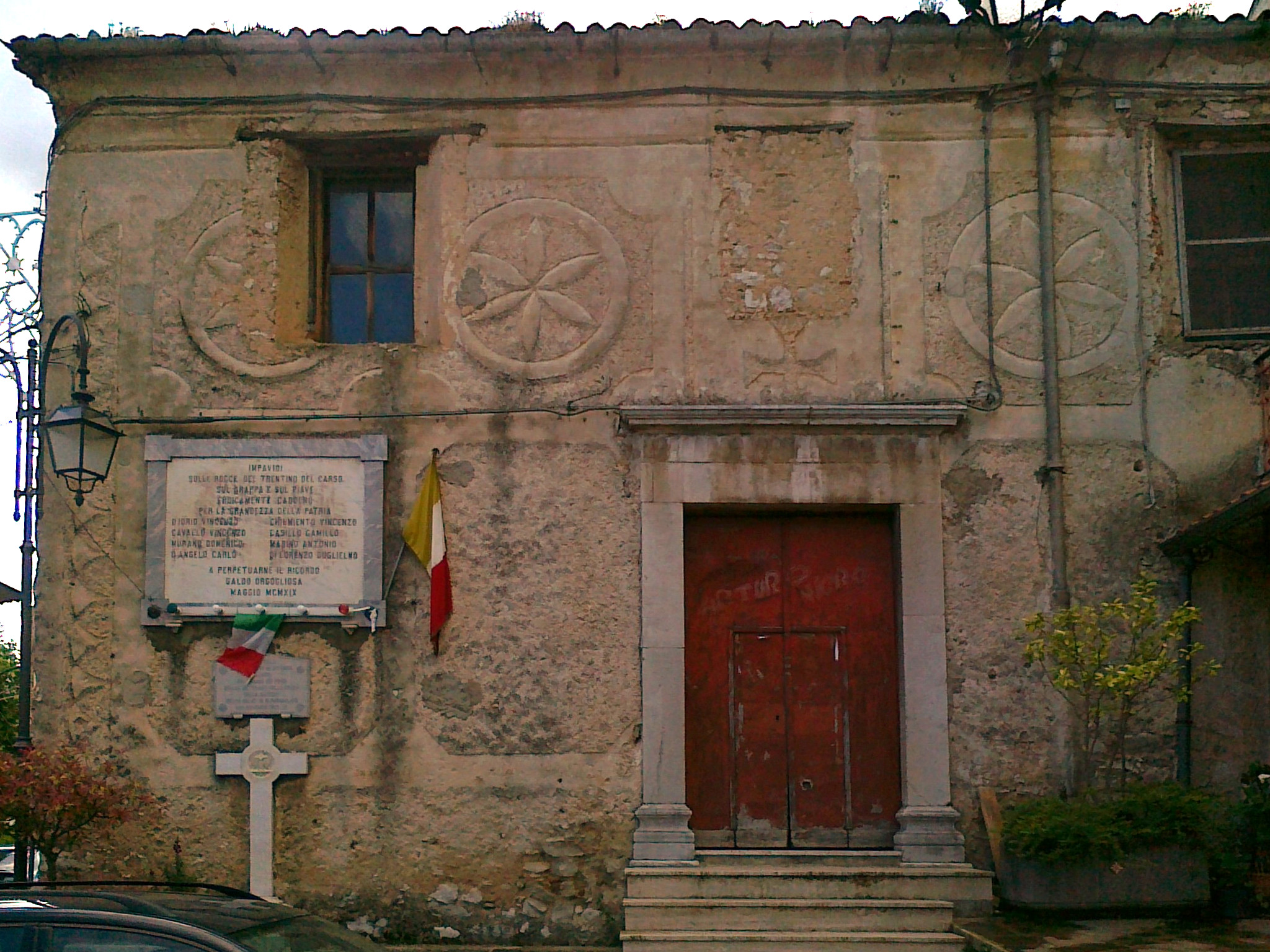
Facade of the medieval church in Galdo degli Alburni, Province of Salerno, Italy

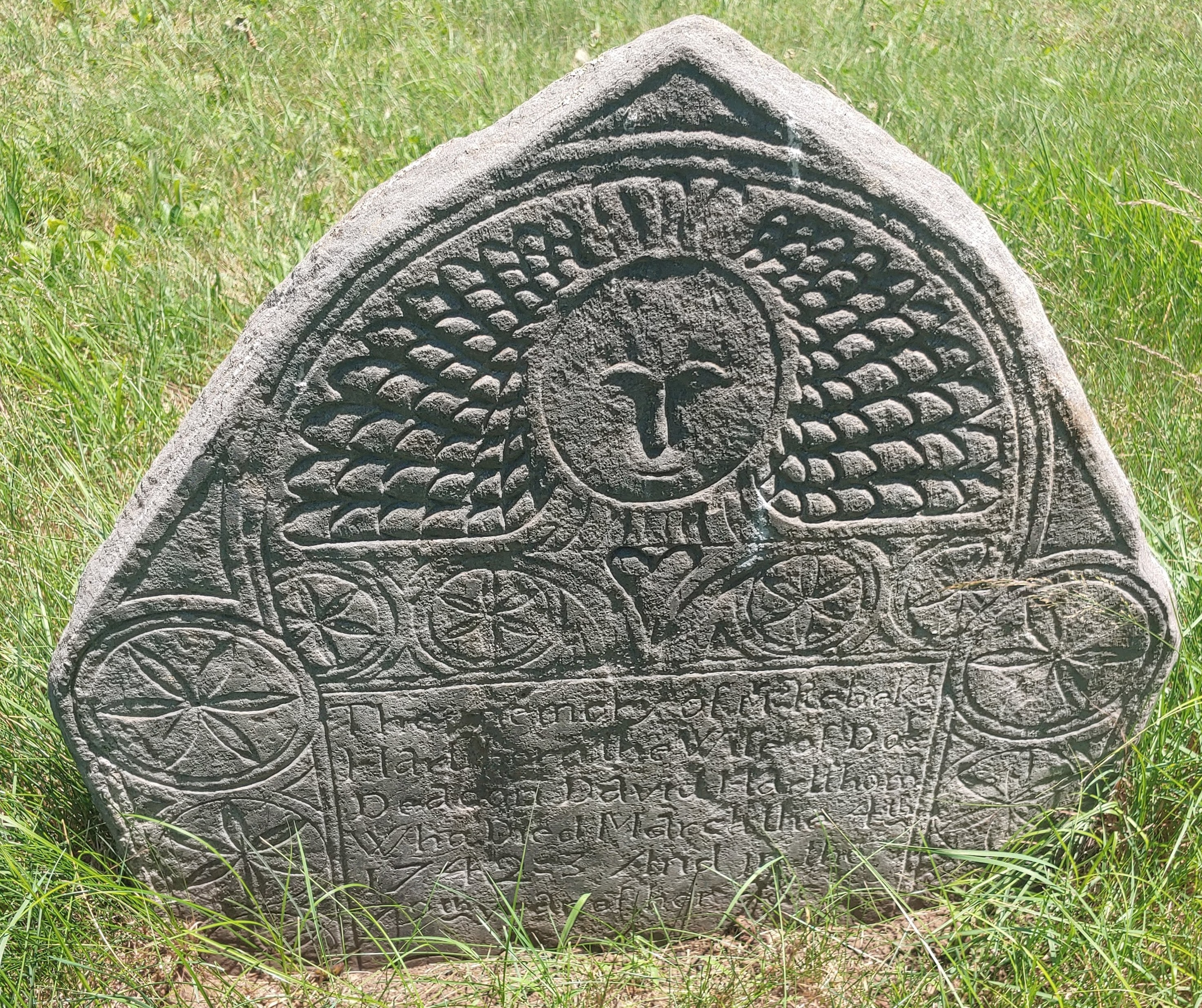
Hexafoils featured prominently on a Colonial New England gravestone carved by Obadiah Wheeler in Franklin Connecticut.

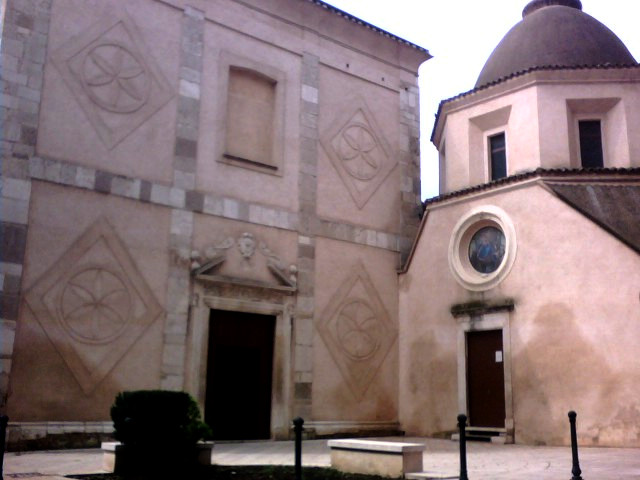
Facade of the church in San Domenico, Lucera, Province of Foggia, Italy (ca. 1300)

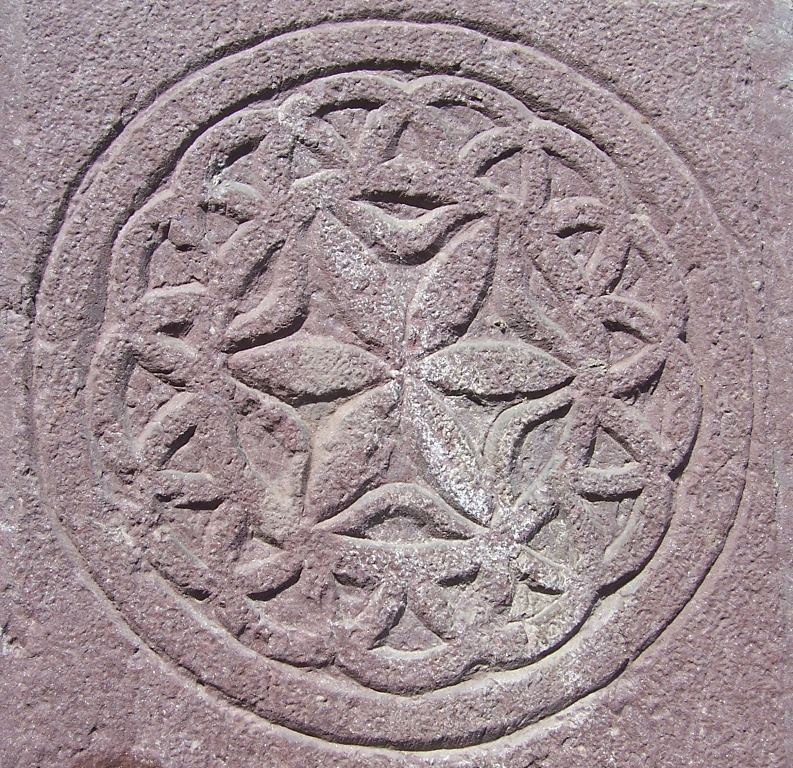
Masonry in casa Federici, Erbanno, Val Camonica, Italy

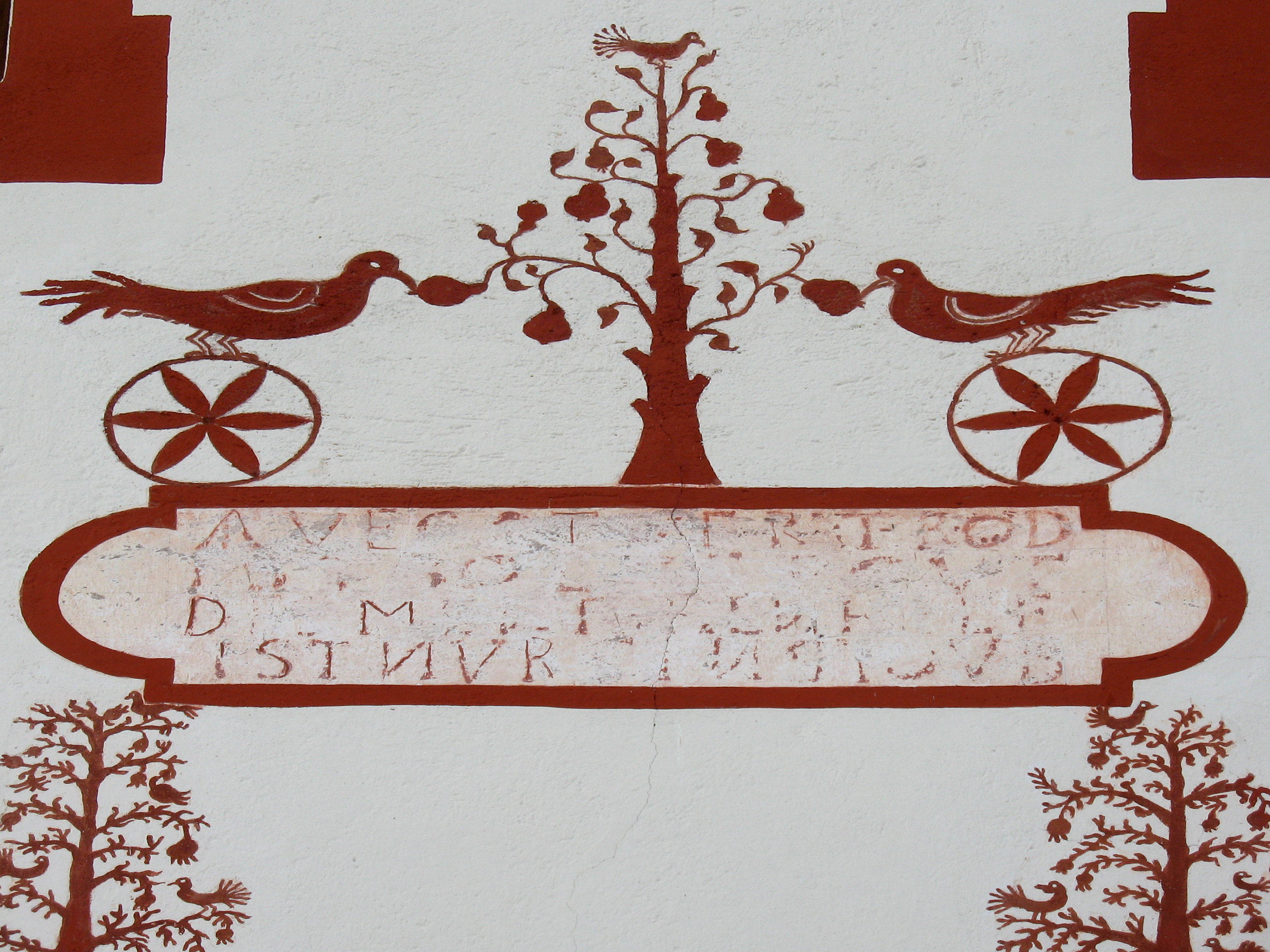
Wall painting on the facade of farmhouse Runcata in St. Ulrich in Gröden, Ortisei, Val Gardena, South Tyrol, Italy

Green-on-white "Sun of the Alps" as used by the Lega Nord

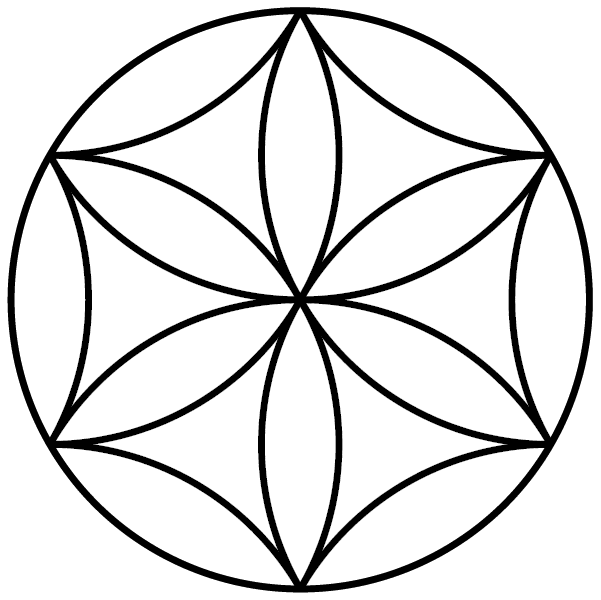
Perun's sign as used within Slavic Native Faith

Logo of the Alt Pirineu Natural Park, Catalonia, Spain

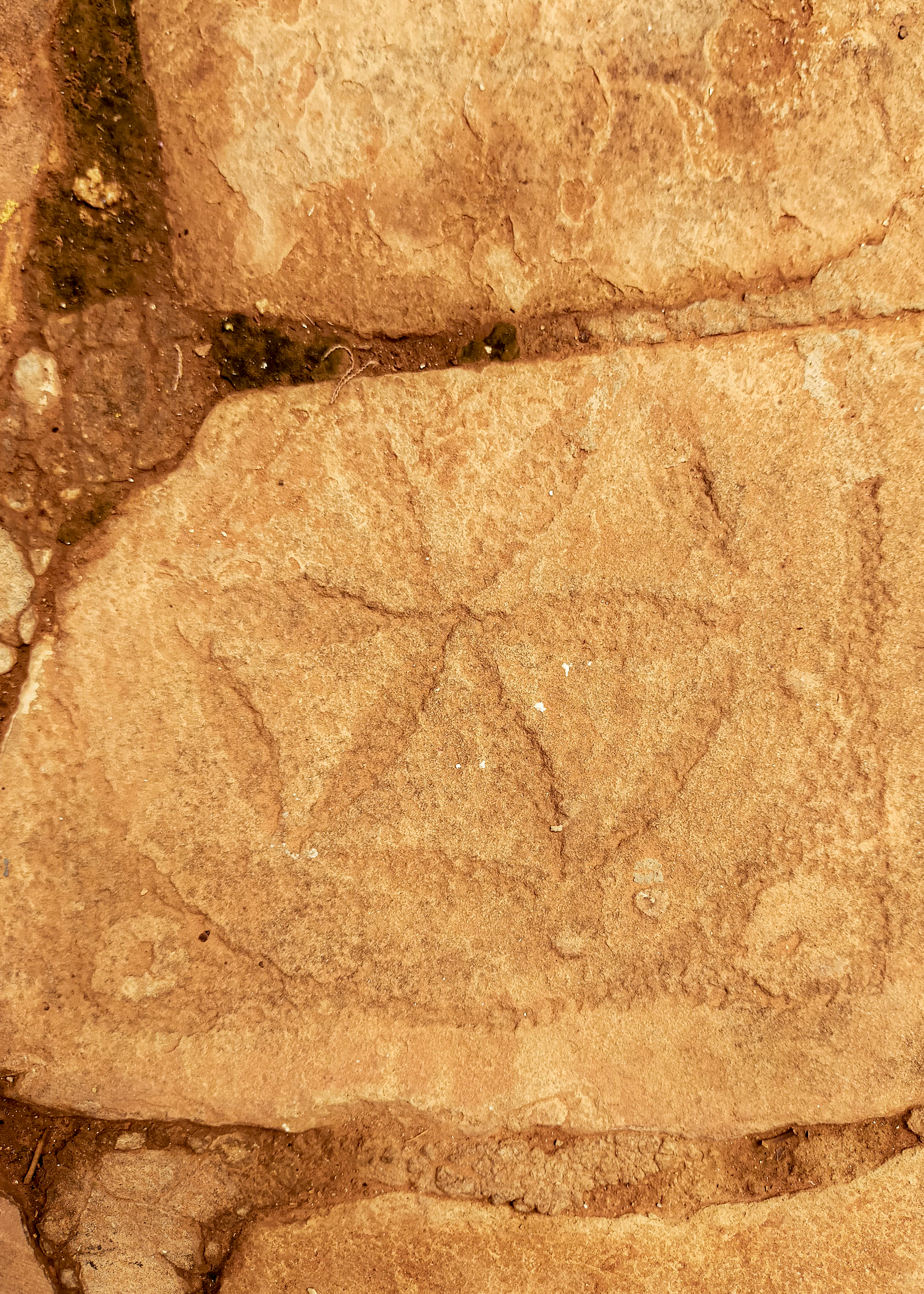
Citadel of El Mechouar, Tlemcen, Algeria

== Origin ==
The origin and meaning of the symbol are not known, but many researchers have independently suggested that it is of religious origin, and very likely served as a protective symbol. There are two main theories for its meaning and origin.

=== Solar symbol ===
Peralta Labrador (1989) cites a proposal according to which the design in the La Tène (Celtic) period was a solar symbol associated with the god Taranis. Other researchers have also described it as a solar symbol, but no reasoning for this has been given. However, the Lithuanian ("little sun") and Italian ("sun of the Alps") names do suggest a solar origin.

=== Thunder wheel ===
Garshol (2021) suggests that the rosette is actually a wheel with spokes, and that it originally signified the Proto-Indo-European thunder god Perkwunos, later becoming associated with his various incarnations, such as Perun, Tarḫunz, Taranis, Thor, and Jupiter. The Russian and Ukrainian names of the symbol, as well as other more involved arguments, are given as rationale.

== Alternate symbol ==
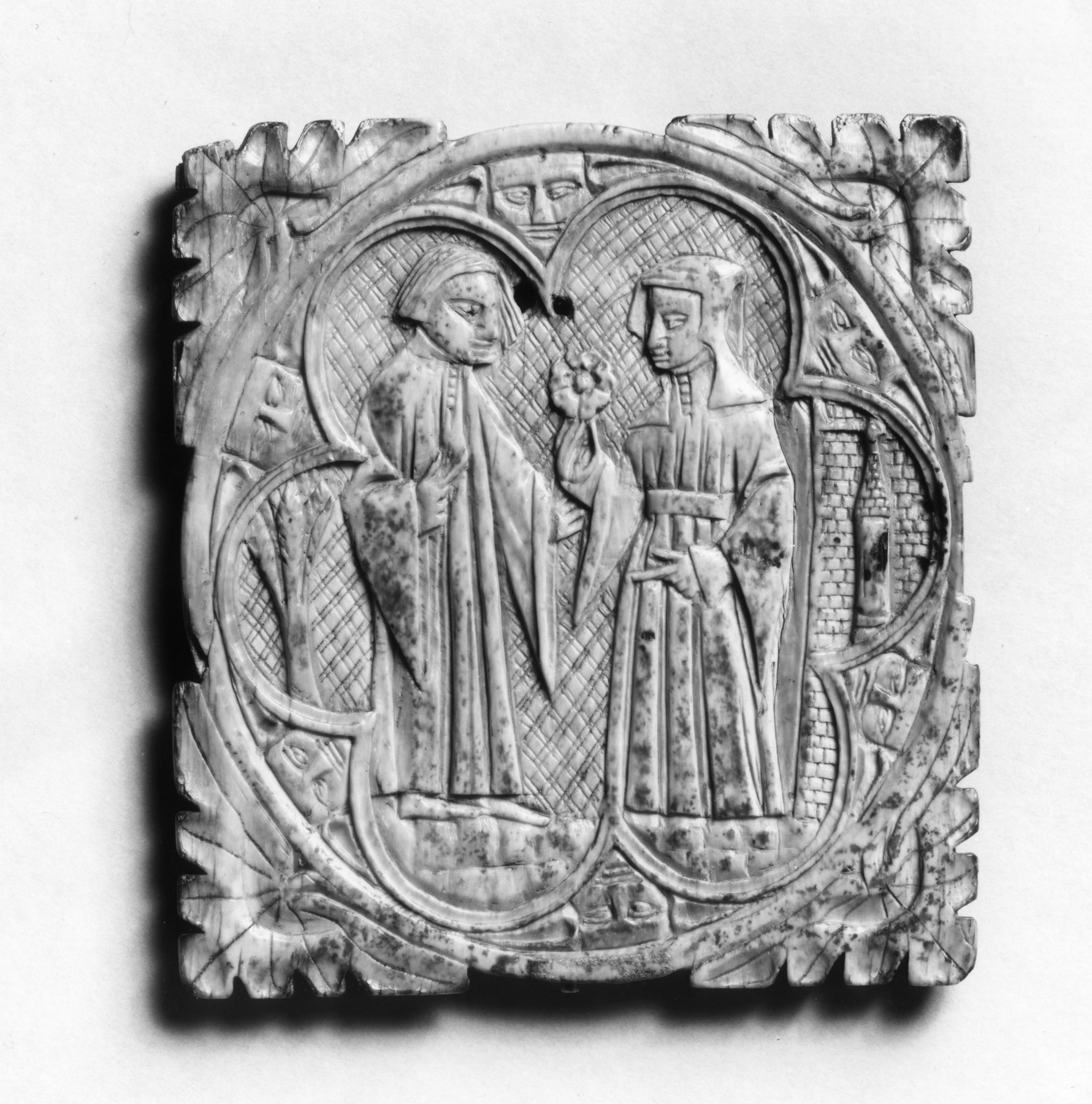
Ivory mirror case with a hexafoil motif (alternate form)

The name hexafoil is sometimes also used to refer to a different geometric design that is used as a traditional element of Gothic architecture, created by overlapping six circular arcs to form a flower-like image. The hexafoil design is modeled after the six petal lily, for its symbolism of purity and relation to the Trinity. The hexafoil form is created from a series of compound units, and exists as a more complex variation of the same extruded figure. Other forms similar to the hexafoil include the trefoil, quatrefoil, and cinquefoil.

The other hexafoil design is implemented in various Gothic buildings constructed in the 12th through 16th century. The traditional design is used in cloisters, triforiums, and stained glass windows of famous buildings such as Notre-Dame, Salisbury Cathedral, and Regensburg Cathedral. Stone cut-out hexafoils are displayed in a plate tracery style in the Salisbury Cathedral, creating a pattern along the triforium.

It can also be seen as a framing design in Bible moralisée. They are often rendered in red, blue, gold, or vibrant orange and surround biblical scenes in the bible. The hexafoil style of framing was often used in conjunction with architectural framing to provide the text with more depth, creativity, invention, and volume. Old Testament illustrations were surrounded by hexafoil frames while moralization depictions favored architectural frames.

== See also ==
- Foil (architecture)
- Overlapping circles grid
- Sudarshana Chakra
- Triquetra
- Triskelion
