= Padanian Declaration of Independence =

The Sun of the Alps, the flag of Padania proposed by Lega Nord

Declaration of independence of Padania issued by Umberto Bossi on 15 September 1996.

The Padanian Declaration of Independence (Italian: Dichiarazione d'indipendenza padana), fully: Declaration of independence and sovereignty of Padania (Dichiarazione di indipendenza e sovranità della Padania) was issued on 15 September 1996 in Venice by Umberto Bossi, leader of Lega Nord.

== See also ==
- Padanian independence
- Umberto Bossi
- Lega Nord
