= Lega Padana =

Piedmontese regionalist political party

Padanian League Lega Padana
- Secretary: Gianluca Noccetti
- Founded: 8 February 1999
- Headquarters: Via San Donato, 55; 10144 Turin
- Ideology: Padanism; Separatism

Website
- legapadana.it

Lega Padana (English: Padanian League) is a Padanist and separatist political party founded in 1999 and active mainly in Piedmont, Italy.

== History ==
The Padanian League was founded in Turin on 8 February 1999. In the 2009 Piedmont provincial election, the Piedmontese section of the party, the Piedmont Padanian League (Piedmontese: Lega Padana Piemont) obtained 1.1% of the vote in the province of Alessandria and 1.0% in the province of Turin. Renzo Rabellino, who was a joint-candidate of several small parties, won 3.5% of the vote and he was elected to the Provincial Council of Turin. In the 2010 Piedmontese regional election, Rabellino ran for president and gained 1.7%. In the 2011 Turin municipal election, the Piedmont Padanian League-supported candidate Domenico Coppola won 3.6% of the vote. Coppola, who had been elected to the City Council of Turin, died a few days later the election.

== See also ==
- Lega Padana Lombardia
- List of political parties in Italy
