= Miss Padania =

Italian beauty contest

Miss Padania is a beauty contest held in Northern Italy and sponsored by Lega Nord.

== Winners ==
- 1997 – Paola Cantamessa
- 1998 – Sara Venturi
- 1999 – Giada Sbalbi
- 2000 – Gloria Anselmi
- 2001 – Francesca De Rose
- 2003 – Alice Grassi
- 2004 – Alice Graci
- 2005 – Laura Albertin
- 2006 – Anna Bonansea
- 2007 – Alessandra Piscopo
- 2008 – Francesca Crocini
- 2009 – Dora Laura Mazzei
