= Padanian nationalism =

Ideology and regionalist movement in Northern Italy

The Sun of the Alps, the flag of Padania proposed by Lega Nord

Padanian nationalism is a secessionist ideology and a regionalist movement demanding more autonomy, or even independence from Italy, for Padania, a region encompassing northern and, to some extent, part of central Italy.

Lega Nord, a federation of regional parties, proclaimed the formation of the "Federal Republic of Padania" in 1996 and was the main political proponent of Padanian nationalism until 2013, when the party shifted back toward federalism and regionalism, as well as adopting to some extent Italian nationalism, under Matteo Salvini's leadership. However, the party still includes Padanist factions and people, notably including founder and former leader Umberto Bossi. Additionally, there have been some minor Padanian nationalist parties, such as Lega Padana, Lega Padana Lombardia/Padanian Union, the Alpine Padanian Union, the Padanian Independentist Movement, Veneto Padanian Federal Republic, the Popular Party of the North and Pact for the North. Padanians focus their historical and genetical heritage to the Celtic and cisalpine era, but also have pride for their longobards ancestors and medieval states. There also have been some intellectuals, such as Gianfranco Miglio, Gilberto Oneto, Giancarlo Pagliarini and Leonardo Facco, who have continued to be keen Padanists, after breaking with Lega Nord. In January 2012, Gianluca Marchi, a former editor of La Padania, launched L'Indipendenza, an online newspaper, as the voice of independent Padanism and Padanian libertarianism. Oneto, Pagliarini and Facco were all contributing editors of it. Similar movements include Lombard nationalism and Venetian nationalism.

== Padania and Lega Nord ==
Lega Nord unilaterally proclaimed the independence of Padania on 15 September 1996 in Venice, but since then has come back to its original federalist credo, although the party constitution continues to declare that the independence of Padania is the party's final goal. In that occasion Umberto Bossi, the leader of Lega Nord, while reading the Padanian Declaration of Independence, echoing the United States Declaration of Independence, proclaimed:

We the peoples of Padania solemnly declare that Padania is an independent and sovereign federal republic. We mutually pledge to each other our lives, our fortunes and our sacred honour.

Padania itself was presented as a natural territorial unit adjacent to the Po River basin, although it has never existed as an administrative or political entity prior to the party's campaign. Lega Nord therefore attempted to establish a Padanian geography and history to support claims of northern distinctiveness.

In the following years Lega Nord installed a non-recognized Padanian Parliament near Mantua, elected in self-organized elections and a government in Venice. Later, a "Parliament of the North" was established in Vicenza, but functioned merely as an internal structure of the party. Lega Nord also proposed a flag, the Sun of the Alps, and a national anthem, the Va' Pensiero chorus from Giuseppe Verdi's Nabucco, in which the exiled Hebrew slaves lament for their lost homeland. The party also tried to expand its reach through a number of Padanian-styled associations and media endeavours (under the supervision of Davide Caparini), notably including La Padania daily, Il Sole delle Alpi weekly, the Lega Nord Flash periodical, the TelePadania TV channel, the Radio Padania Libera and the "Bruno Salvadori" publishing house. More recently the party stressed the independent status of Padania through sports and other activities: the Padania national football team took part and won 2008, 2009 and 2010 VIVA World Cup; the party also sponsored a beauty contest, Miss Padania.

The initial electoral appeal of Lega Nord was rooted in the failure of the Christian Democracy party to mediate effectively on behalf of artisans and small businesses in the face of economic liberalization. In his early speeches, Bossi liked to point out that the League was hence not a party, but a popular movement that embodied the North's needs and demands against a corrupt party system in Rome. The main reason that Lega Nord focused its attack on southern Italians was that it required a distinct territorial "other" to validate its own authentic regional identity, a trend that is commonly seen in populist parties across western Europe. The contention was that Northerners are productive, hardworking, honest, and civic, while Southerners are parasitical and clannish. While the anti-elite and anti-Rome elements have remained, the League's electoral success in the 2008 general election is largely attributed to its articulation of an anti-immigrant sentiment. Lega Nord did unexpectedly well, winning nearly 9% of the national vote, and capturing more than 20% of the electorate in many areas throughout Lombardy and Veneto. By that time, Lega Nord had moved beyond its secessionist stance of the mid-1990s and become a reliable ally with center-right Forza Italia and, later, right-wing Brothers of Italy, finally being transformed into Lega.

=== Lega Nord's Padania ===
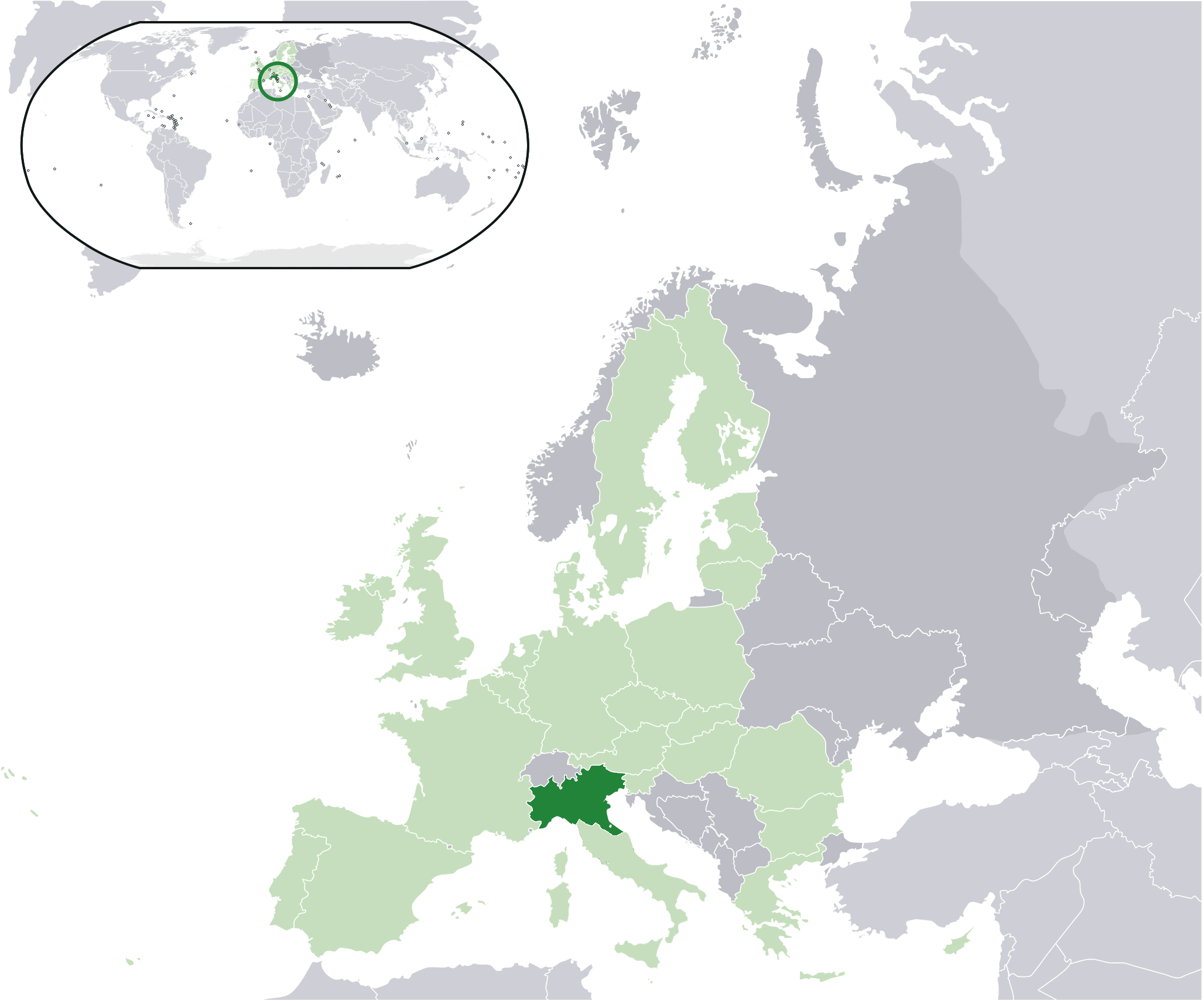
Map of Europe, showing Padania (as claimed by Lega Padana) in dark green

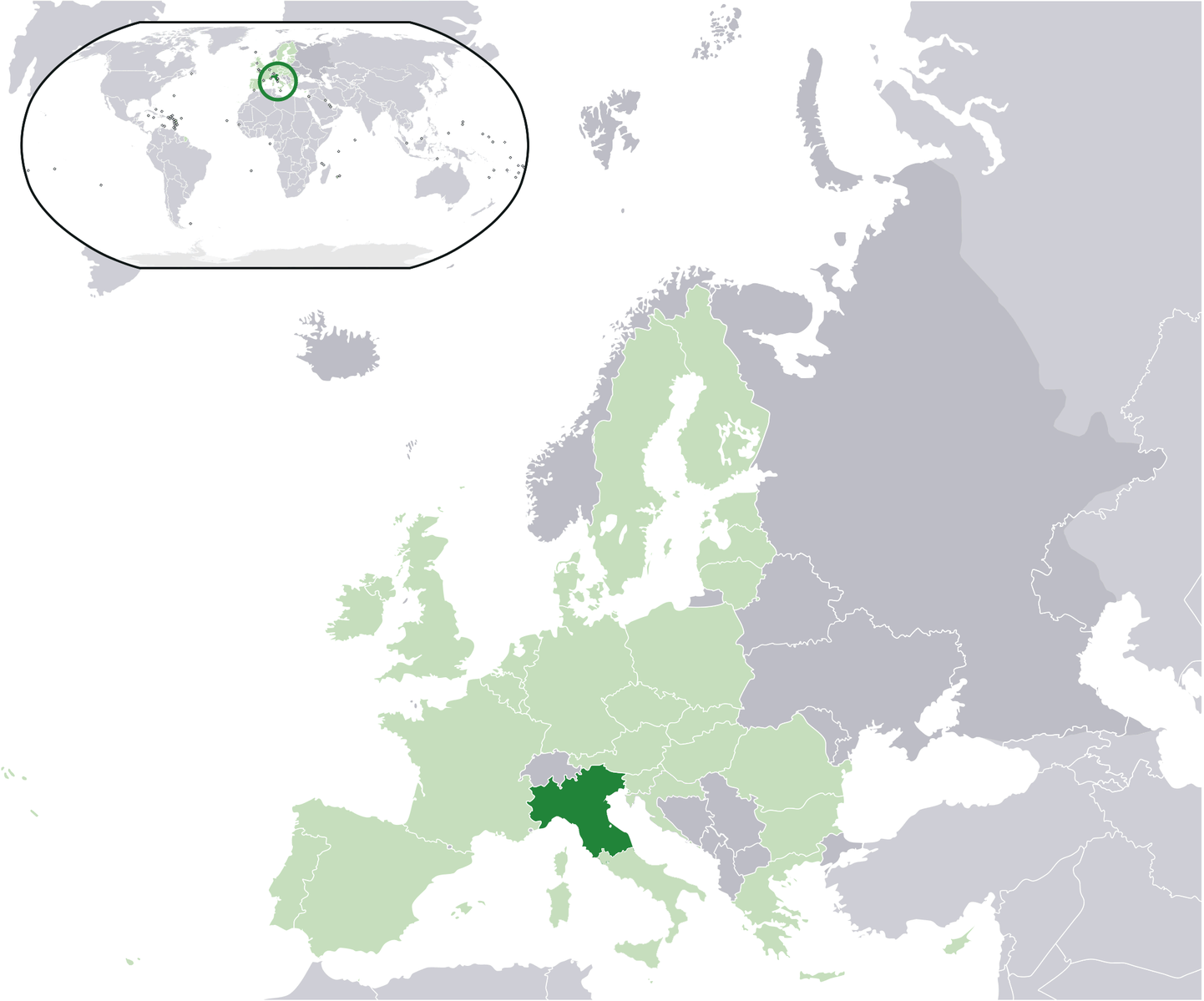
Map of Europe, showing Padania (as claimed by Lega Nord) in dark green

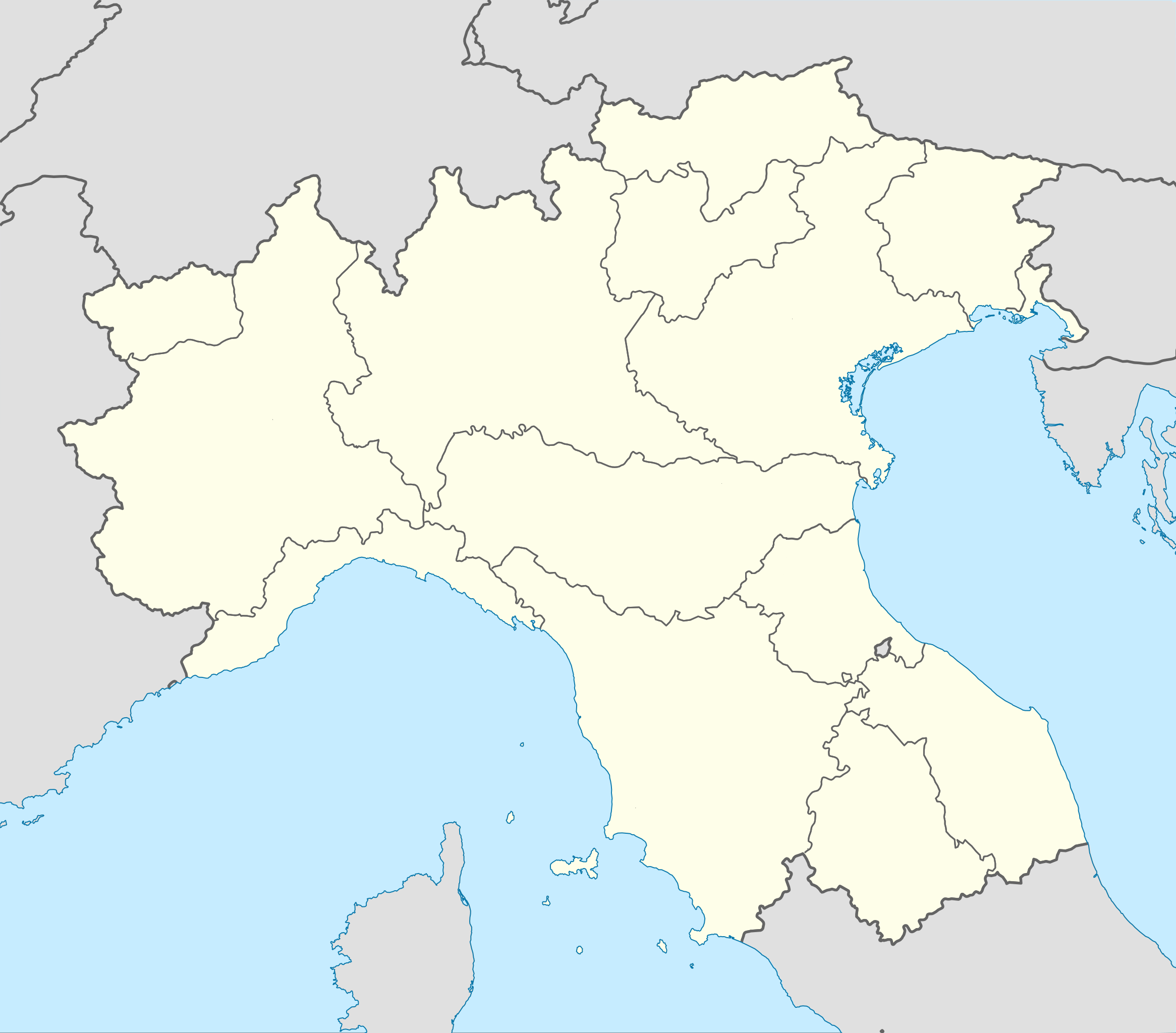
Nations of Padania as claimed by Lega Nord

Region	Population	Area (km²)
Lombardy	9,964,993	23,865
Veneto	4,841,270	18,391
Piedmont	4,273,210	25,399
Emilia-Romagna	4,448,545	22,451
Liguria	1,509,805	5,418
Friuli-Venezia Giulia	1,197,392	7,845
Trentino-Alto Adige/Südtirol	1,078,746	13,607
Aosta Valley	123,513	3,263
Northern Italy	27,437,474	120,243
Tuscany	3,668,333	22,993
Marche	1,501,406	9,366
Umbria	865,013	8,456
Padania (total)	33,472,226	161,076

== Opinion polling ==
While support for a federal system, as opposed to a centrally administered state, receives widespread consensus within Padania, support for independence is less favoured. One poll in 1996 estimated that 52.4% of interviewees from Northern Italy considered secession advantageous (vantaggiosa) and 23.2% both advantageous and desirable (auspicabile). Another poll in 2000 estimated that about 20% of "Padanians" (18.3% in North-West Italy and 27.4% in North-East Italy) supported secession in case Italy was not reformed into a federal state.

More recent polls show different results. According to a poll conducted in February 2010 by GPG, 45% of Northerners support the independence of Padania. A poll conducted by SWG in June 2010 puts that figure at 61% of Northerners (with 80% of them supporting at least federal reform), while noting that 55% of Italians consider Padania as only a political invention, against 42% believing in its real existence (45% of the sample being composed of Northerners, 19% of Central Italians and 36% of Southerners). As for federal reform, according to the poll, 58% of Italians support it. A more recent poll by SWG puts the support for fiscal federalism and secession respectively at 68% and 37% in Piedmont and Liguria, 77% and 46% in Lombardy, 81% and 55% in Triveneto (comprising Veneto), 63% and 31% in Emilia-Romagna, 51% and 19% in Central Italy (not including Lazio).

== Contemporary Expression and Electoral Success ==
The initial electoral appeal of Lega Nord was rooted in the failure of the Christian Democratic Party to mediate effectively on behalf of artisans and small businesses in the face of economic liberalization. In his early speeches, Bossi liked to point out that the League was hence not a party, but a popular movement that embodied the North's needs and demands against a corrupt party system in Rome.

The main reason that the Northern League focused its attack on Southern Italians is that it required a distinct territorial "other" to validate its own authentic regional identity, a trend that is commonly seen in populist parties across Western Europe. The contention was that Northerners are productive, hardworking, honest, and civic, while Southerners are parasitical and clannish.

While the anti-elite and anti-Rome elements have remained, the League's electoral success in the 2008 general elections are largely attributed to its articulation of an anti-immigrant sentiment. Lega Nord did unexpectedly well, winning nearly 9% of the national vote, and capturing more than 20% of the electorate in many areas throughout Lombardy and Veneto.

Looking at its contemporary positioning, once Lega Nord moved beyond its secessionist stance of the mid-1990s it has become a reliable ally with Berlusconi's center-right party, Forza Italia.

== Bibliography ==
- Gianfranco Miglio, Come cambiare. Le mie riforme, Mondadori, Milan 1992
- Gianfranco Miglio, Henry David Thoreau, Disobbedienza civile, Mondadori, Milan 1993
- Gianfranco Miglio, Italia 1996: così è andata a finire, Mondadori, Milan 1993
- Gianfranco Miglio, Io, Bossi e la Lega, Mondadori, Milan 1994
- Gianfranco Miglio, La Costituzione federale, Mondadori, Milan 1995
- Gianfranco Miglio, Marcello Veneziani, Padania, Italia. Lo Stato nazionale è soltanto in crisi o non è mai esistito?, Le Lettere, Florence 1997
- Gianfranco Miglio, Augusto Barbera, Federalismo e secessione. Un dialogo, Mondatori, Milan 1997
- Gianfranco Miglio, Federalismi falsi e degenerati, Sperling & Kupfer, Milan 1997
- Gianfranco Miglio, L'asino di Buridano, Neri Pozza, Vicenza 1999
- Gilberto Oneto, Bandiere di libertà: Simboli e vessilli dei Popoli dell'Italia settentrionale, FdF, Milan 1992
- Gilberto Oneto, Pianificazione del territorio, federalismo e autonomie locali, Alinea, Florence 1994
- Gilberto Oneto, L'invenzione della Padania, Foedus Editore, Ceresola (BG) 1997
- Gilberto Oneto, Giancarlo Pagliarini, 50 buone ragioni per l'Indipendenza, La Padania, Milan 1998
- Benito Giordano, Italian Regionalism or Padanian Nationalism — the Political Project of the Lega Nord in Italian Politics, Political Geography, vol.19, 2000
- Gilberto Oneto, Piccolo è libero, Leonardo Facco Editore, Treviglio (BG) 2005
- Gilberto Oneto, L' iperitaliano. Eroe o cialtrone? Biografia senza censure di Giuseppe Garibaldi, Il Cerchio, Rimini 2006
- Dwayne Woods, The Many Faces of Populism in Italy: The Northern League and Berlusconism, Research in Political Sociology, 2014
