= Sun of the Alps =

Symbol; hexafoil surrounded by a circle

Sun of the Alps

The Sun of the Alps (Lombard: Sul di Alp, Italian: Sole delle Alpi) is a round ornament consisting of six petals surrounded by a ring touching the outer tips of the petals which usually has a thickness similar to the width of the petals. Since the 1990s, a green colored version is used as a political symbol by separatists in the northern part of Italy (see Padanian nationalism), who made this name popular as this region is located south of the Alps. It resembles a pattern often found in that area on buildings. It is also used in the flag of Arpitania, in a red and white version.
