= 2021 Turin municipal election =

Mayoral and city election in Turin, Italy

- 3 and 4 October 2021 (first round); 17 and 18 October 2021 (second round)
- Turnout: 331,566 · 48.08% (▼9.10 pp); 290,632 · 42.14% (▼12.27 pp)
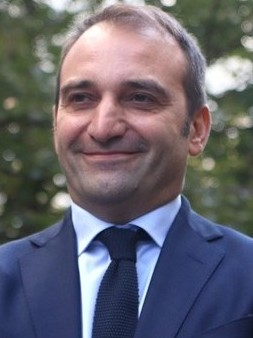

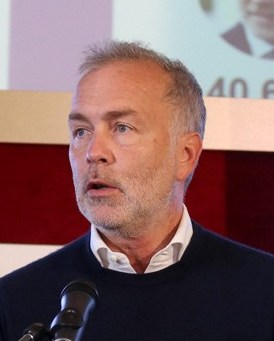
	First party	Second party
Candidate	Stefano Lo Russo	Paolo Damilano
Party	Democratic Party	Independent
Alliance	Centre-left	Centre-right
Last election	41.83% 45.44%	18.76% (separately); N/A
Seats before	11	4
Seats won	24	13
Seat change	▲13	▲9
Popular vote	140,200; 168,997	124,347; 116,322
Percentage	43.86% 59.23%	38.90% 40.77%
Swing	▲2.03 pp ▲13.79 pp	▲20.14 pp N/A
Mayor before election
Chiara Appendino
M5S
Elected mayor
Stefano Lo Russo
PD

Municipal elections were held in Turin, Piedmont, on 3 and 4 October 2021 to elect the mayor of Turin and the 38 members of the City Council of Turin. Originally scheduled for June 2021, the election was postponed due to the COVID-19 pandemic in Italy. Since no mayoral candidate won a majority of votes on the first round, where the centre-left coalition candidate Stefano Lo Russo (a member of the Catholic wing of the Democratic Party) narrowly finished first against most opinion polling, a runoff election was held on 17 and 18 October 2021. The second round was won in a landslide by Lo Russo, who outperformed the polls and was officially inaugurated as the new mayor of Turin on 27 October 2021. Chiara Appendino of the Five Star Movement, who was the incumbent mayor of Turin, did not run for re-election.

== Background ==
=== Electoral system ===
The voting system for the office of mayor of Turin is used for all mayoral elections in Italy in the cities with a population higher than 15,000 inhabitants. Under this system, voters express a direct choice for the mayor or an indirect choice voting for the party of the candidate's coalition. If no candidate receives 50% of votes, the top two candidates go to a second round after two weeks. The winning candidate obtains a majority bonus equal to 60% of seats. During the first round, if no candidate gets more than 50% of votes but a coalition of lists gets the majority of 50% of votes, or if the mayor is elected in the first round but its coalition gets less than 40% of the valid votes, the majority bonus cannot be assigned to the coalition of the winning mayor candidate. The election of the City Council of Turin is based on a direct choice for the candidate with a maximum of two preferential votes, each for a different gender, belonging to the same party list; the candidate with the majority of the preferences is elected. The number of the seats for each party is determined proportionally, using the D'Hondt method for seat allocation. Only coalitions with more than 3% of votes are eligible to get any seats.

=== Centre-left coalition primary election ===
Candidate	Party	Votes	%	Notes
Stefano Lo Russo	Democratic Party	4.229	37,5%	
Francesco Tresso	Independent	3.932	34,9%	
Enzo Lavolta	Democratic Party	2.864	25,4%	
Igor Boni	More Europe	257	2,3%	
Total		11.325	100	

== Political parties and candidates ==
List of the political parties and candidates that took part in the election
Political force or alliance	Constituent lists	Candidate
Centre-right coalition	League	Paolo Damilano
Centre-right coalition	Brothers of Italy	Paolo Damilano
Centre-right coalition	Forza Italia (UDC, PLI, PU, DC)	Paolo Damilano
Centre-right coalition	Beautiful Turin	Paolo Damilano
Centre-right coalition	Progress Turin	Paolo Damilano
Centre-right coalition	Yes TAV Yes Work – Renaissance	Paolo Damilano
Centre-right coalition	The People of the Family	Paolo Damilano
Centre-left coalition	Democratic Party	Stefano Lo Russo
Centre-left coalition	Lo Russo for Mayor (DemoS, CD, IV, A, +E, RI, Volt, Monviso Civic List, Alliance for Turin)	Stefano Lo Russo
Centre-left coalition	Ecologist Left (SI, Pos)	Stefano Lo Russo
Centre-left coalition	Moderates	Stefano Lo Russo
Centre-left coalition	Turin Tomorrow	Stefano Lo Russo
Centre-left coalition	Art. 1 – PSI	Stefano Lo Russo
Sganga coalition	Five Star Movement	Valentina Sganga
Sganga coalition	Green Europe	Valentina Sganga
D'Orsi coalition	Common Left (PRC, SA, DemA)	Angelo D'Orsi
D'Orsi coalition	Italian Communist Party	Angelo D'Orsi
D'Orsi coalition	Power to the People	Angelo D'Orsi
Di Cristina coalition	Communist Party	Giusi Greta Di Cristina
Di Cristina coalition	Turin Future City	Giusi Greta Di Cristina
Futura for the Common Goods		Ugo Mattei
Workers' Communist Party		Massimo Chiesi
3V Movement		Paolo Alonge
Turin Environmental Movement (4 October Movement)		Roberto Salerno
Prohibition to Dismiss		Lorenzo Varaldo
Turin Capital of Europe – Stop ISEE		Emilio Mazza
Verra coalition	Italexit	Ivano Verra
Verra coalition	We Citizens	Ivano Verra
Balducci coalition	Gay Party	Davide Betti Balducci
Balducci coalition	Animalist Party	Davide Betti Balducci

== Declined candidates ==
=== Withdrew ===
==== Centre-left coalition ====
- Mauro Salizzoni, medic and regional councilor of Piedmont (since 2019).

=== Declined ===
==== Centre-left coalition ====
- Sergio Chiamparino, former president of Piedmont (2014–2019) and mayor of Turin (2001–2011).
- Guido Saracco, rector of the Polytechnic University of Turin since 2018.

==== Five Star Movement ====
- Chiara Appendino, mayor of Turin since 2016.

== Opinion polls ==
=== First round ===
Date	Polling firm	Sample size	Sganga	Lo Russo	Damilano	Others	Undecided	Lead
4 October 2021	Election result	—	9.0	43.9	38.9	8.2	—	5.0
12–15 Sep 2021	Noto	1,000	9.0	40.0	42.0	9.0	29.0	2.0
9–15 Sep 2021	SWG	1,000	9.0	42.0	42.0	7.0	21.0	Tie
6–11 Sep 2021	Ipsos	1,000	9.5	39.0	42.0	9.5	27.0	3.0
7–10 Sep 2021	Quorum	805	8.6	42.8	43.7	4.9	43.2	0.9
3–8 Sep 2021	Quorum	808	8.3	41.4	44.2	6.1	39.6	2.8
27–29 Aug 2021	BiDiMedia	809	11.1	38.9	41.6	8.4	23.0	2.7
3–5 Aug 2021	Demopolis	1,804	13.0	34.0	41.0	12.0	37.0	7.0
29 Jun–12 Jul 2021	SWG	1,600	8.0	43.0	44.0	5.0	22.0	1.0
25 Jun 2021	Euromedia Research	1,000	11.9	39.6	43.7	4.8	—N/a	4.1
10–15 May 2021	BiDiMedia	1,337	12.6	38.2	40.1	9.1	30.0	1.9

=== Second round ===
Damilano vs. Lo Russo

Date	Polling firm	Sample size	Damilano	Lo Russo	Abstain	Lead
4 October 2021	Election result	—	40.7	59.2	—	18.5
9–15 Sep 2021	SWG	1,000	48.0	52.0	—N/a	4.0
6–11 Sep 2021	Ipsos	1,000	48.0	52.0	—N/a	4.0
7–10 Sep 2021	Quorum	805	47.4	52.6	44.9	5.2
3–8 Sep 2021	Quorum	808	46.9	53.1	47.8	6.2
27–29 Aug 2021	BiDiMedia	809	48.0	52.0	—N/a	4.0
16 Jul 2021	SWG	1,600	48.0	52.0	—N/a	4.0
25 Jun 2021	Euromedia Research	1,000	50.2	49.8	37.3	0.4
10–15 May 2021	BiDiMedia	1,337	47.0	53.0	—N/a	6.0

=== Political parties ===
Date	Polling firm	Sample size	Centre-left								Centre-right						M5S–EV		Others	Lead
Date	Polling firm	Sample size	PD	A	IV	+E	Volt	Mod	SI	Others	FdI	LSP	BT	FI	C!	Others	M5S	EV	Others	Lead
4 October 2021	Election result	—	28.6	5.0				3.4	3.6	3.5	10.5	9.8	11.9	5.3	1.6		8.0	0.9	8.0	18.1
9–15 Sep 2021	SWG	1,000	25.9	—N/a	—N/a	—N/a	—N/a	3.8	3.2	8.3	10.7	19.4	2.1	8.3	—N/a	1.5	7.6	1.6	7.6	6.5
6–11 Sep 2021	Ipsos	1,000	31.2	4.6				1.5	—N/a	1.5	9.5	20.0	2.5	9.2	—N/a	1.8	8.9	1.0	8.3	11.2
3–8 Sep 2021	Quorum	808	32.3	—N/a	—N/a	—N/a	—N/a	—N/a	—N/a	8.2	14.7	19.4	—N/a	4.2	—N/a	4.8	7.4	1.4	7.6	12.9
27–29 Aug 2021	BiDiMedia	809	26.5	—N/a	—N/a	—N/a	—N/a	3.4	3.4	6.3	15.8	13.4	4.5	3.7	1.5	1.9	9.2	2.2	8.2	10.7
29 Jun–12 Jul 2021	SWG	1,600	30.5	1.5	1.5	—N/a	—N/a	3.0	2.0	5.5	11.0	21.5	2.5	8.0	—N/a	—N/a	8.5	—N/a	4.5	9.0
10–15 May 2021	BiDiMedia	1,337	23.2	2.7	2.5	1.5	0.8	3.1	2.2	1.8	15.4	14.7	5.0	3.9	0.6	—N/a	12.7	1.9	9.0	7.8
5 June 2016	Election result	—	29.8	DNP	DNP	DNP	DNP	5.9	DNP	6.8	1.5	5.8	DNP	4.7	DNP	4.2	30.0	DNP	11.9	0.2

== Results ==
Candidate	First round		Runoff		Leader's seats	Political party or party list	Votes	%	Seats
Candidate	Votes	%	Votes	%	Leader's seats	Political party or party list	Votes	%	Seats
Stefano Lo Russo	140,200	43.86	168,997	59.23	–	Democratic Party	85,890	28.56	17
Stefano Lo Russo	140,200	43.86	168,997	59.23	–	Lo Russo List	15,013	4.99	2
Stefano Lo Russo	140,200	43.86	168,997	59.23	–	Ecologist Left	10,807	3.59	2
Stefano Lo Russo	140,200	43.86	168,997	59.23	–	Moderates	10,177	3.38	2
Stefano Lo Russo	140,200	43.86	168,997	59.23	–	Turin Tomorrow	7,960	2.65	1
Stefano Lo Russo	140,200	43.86	168,997	59.23	–	Article One – PSI	2,407	0.80	–
Stefano Lo Russo	140,200	43.86	168,997	59.23	–	Total	132,254	43.97	24
Paolo Damilano	124,347	38.90	116,322	40.77	check	Beautiful Turin	35,658	11.86	4
Paolo Damilano	124,347	38.90	116,322	40.77	check	Brothers of Italy	31,490	10.47	3
Paolo Damilano	124,347	38.90	116,322	40.77	check	League	29,593	9.84	3
Paolo Damilano	124,347	38.90	116,322	40.77	check	Forza Italia – UDC – PLI	15,951	5.30	2
Paolo Damilano	124,347	38.90	116,322	40.77	check	Turin Progress	2,236	0.74	–
Paolo Damilano	124,347	38.90	116,322	40.77	check	The People of the Family	1,320	0.44	–
Paolo Damilano	124,347	38.90	116,322	40.77	check	Yes TAV Yes Work – Renaissance	1,305	0.43	–
Paolo Damilano	124,347	38.90	116,322	40.77	check	Total	117,553	39.08	12
Valentina Sganga	28,785	9.01	–	–	check	Five Star Movement	24,058	8.00	2
Valentina Sganga	28,785	9.01	–	–	check	Green Europe	2,711	0.90	–
Valentina Sganga	28,785	9.01	–	–	check	Total	26,769	8.90	2
Angelo d'Orsi	8,095	2.53	–	–	–	Left in Common (PRC – DemA – SA)	3,512	1.17	–
Angelo d'Orsi	8,095	2.53	–	–	–	Italian Communist Party	1,838	0.61	–
Angelo d'Orsi	8,095	2.53	–	–	–	Power to the People	1,656	0.55	–
Angelo d'Orsi	8,095	2.53	–	–	–	Total	7,006	2.33	–
Ugo Mattei	7,406	2.32	–	–	–	Futura	6,975	2.32	–
Francesco Ivano Verra	2,677	0.84	–	–	–	Italexit	2,353	0.78	–
Francesco Ivano Verra	2,677	0.84	–	–	–	We Citizens	240	0.08	–
Francesco Ivano Verra	2,677	0.84	–	–	–	Total	2,593	0.86	–
Davide Betti	2,241	0.70	–	–	–	Gay Party	1,336	0.44	–
Davide Betti	2,241	0.70	–	–	–	Italian Animalist Party	775	0.26	–
Davide Betti	2,241	0.70	–	–	–	Total	2,111	0.70	–
Greta Giusi Di Cristina	2,123	0.66	–	–	–	Communist Party	1,552	0.52	–
Greta Giusi Di Cristina	2,123	0.66	–	–	–	Turin Future City	454	0.15	–
Greta Giusi Di Cristina	2,123	0.66	–	–	–	Total	2,006	0.67	–
Paolo Alonge	1,666	0.52	–	–	–	3V Movement	1,609	0.53	–
Roberto Salerno	910	0.28	–	–	–	Turin Environmental Movement	792	0.26	–
Lorenzo Varaldo	545	0.17	–	–	–	Prohibition of Dismissing	493	0.16	–
Massimo Chiesi	384	0.12	–	–	–	Workers' Communist Party	360	0.12	–
Emilio Mazza	264	0.08	–	–	–	Turin Capital of Europe	262	0,09	–
Total candidates	319,643	100	285,319	100	2	Total parties	300,783	100	38
Total valid votes	319,643	96.40	285,319	98.17					
Blank or invalid ballots	11,923	3.60	5,313	1.83					
Turnout	331,566	48.08	290,632	42.14					
Eligible voters	689,684	100.00	689,684	100.00					
Source: Ministry of the Interior (first round – second round)

Notes

- According to the Italian electoral law of 1993 for the municipalities of Italy, if a defeated candidate for mayor obtains over 3% of votes, the mayoral candidate is automatically elected city councillor (in this case Lo Russo, Damilano, and Sganga were all elected). The candidate elected mayor votes on the city council but is not a member of it.

== See also ==
- 2021 Italian local elections
- Civic list (Italy)
- Elections in Turin
