= 2006 Winter Olympics closing ceremony =

- Part of 2006 Winter Olympics
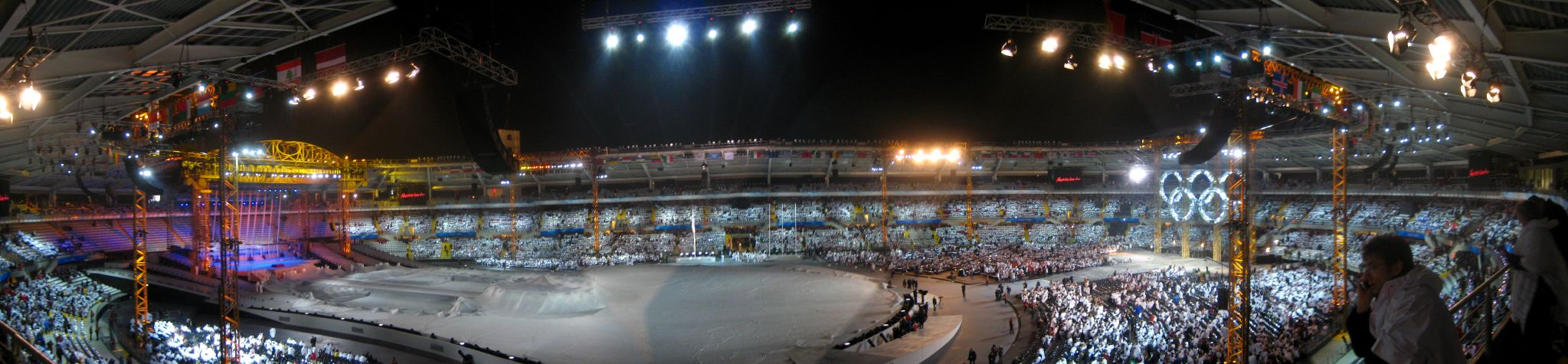
- 2006 Winter Olympics closing ceremony
- Date: 26 February 2006
- Time: 20:00 - 0:00 CET (UTC+1)
- Venue: Stadio Olimpico Grande Torino
- Location: Turin, Italy; 45°2′30.30″N 7°39′0.05″E
- Filmed by: Torino Olympic Broadcasting Organisation (TOBO)
- Footage: The ceremony on the IOC YouTube channel on YouTube

The Closing Ceremony of the 2006 Winter Olympics took place on 26 February 2006 beginning at 20:00 CET (UTC+1) at the Stadio Olimpico in Turin, Italy.

== Program ==
The games were formally closed by International Olympic Committee President Jacques Rogge calling them "magnificent". This again departed from former IOC President Juan Antonio Samaranch's tradition of declaring each games "best ever" and continued Rogge's tradition of assigning each games their own identity in his comments.

=== Medal ceremony ===
During the closing ceremony, in the Olympic Stadium, medals were presented for Cross country skiing at the cross-country skiing men's 50 km free event, one of the last events held at the Games. In a new practice for Winter Olympics closing ceremonies, the medals for this long race were awarded during the ceremony similar to the way the medals for the men's marathon are awarded during the closing ceremonies of Summer Olympic Games.

Giorgio Di Centa of Italy, the host nation, won the race and was presented with the gold medal. Eugeni Dementiev of Russia was awarded silver, with Austria's Mikhail Botvinov claiming the bronze. The medal presenter was former Olympian and current IOC member Manuela Di Centa, sister of the gold medalist.

=== Carnevale ===
The main theme, to coincide with Italy's popular masked festival, was Carnevale. The show, directed by Daniele Finzi Pasca, who is known internationally for his theatre performances based on the circus world, included six of the original costumes from the film I clowns by Federico Fellini, on lease from the Italian national film museum. Life-sized Piedmontese tarot cards marching in drill formation signifying all the Luck, Fortune and Life of the Athletes performed to honor every individuals personal story in coming to Torino. The formal moments of the ceremony alternated with artistic moments inspired by the creativity of Viareggio Carnival artists, of travelling shows and of the typical Italian "feste in piazza". The original music was composed, arranged and orchestrated by Italian producer Michele Centonze in collaboration with Stefano Nanni, Giuseppe Gambino and Serenella Occhipinti (a.k.a. Sara 6).

Fiat 500s and Vespas drove through the center of the stadium to symbolize the crowded streets of the center of the Italian cities.

=== Wind machine ===
A wind machine was shown with flying acrobats performing an aerial ballet. This was a vertical wind tunnel that blew the acrobats up into mid-air. The machine was custom-built by Aerodium Canada and Aerodium Latvia for use in the closing ceremony. It is very similar to machines used for indoor skydiving facilities.

=== Parade of the athletes ===
The athletes entered the arena without strict order, following a tradition started 50 years earlier at the 1956 Summer Games. They had reportedly been given light-up red clown noses to wear, but few athletes were seen wearing the noses.

=== Intruders ===
During the final speech by Valentino Castellani, chairman of the Torino 2006 Olympic Organising Committee, a Spanish-identified intruder ran onto the stage and interrupted Castellani's speech. The intruder shouted "the passion live[s] in Torino" and broke off one of the two microphones on the podium before security officials removed him. Castellani continued his speech with only a minor pause. The intruder's T-shirt displayed the logo of GoldenPalace.com, an online gambling website.

A young Polish nude streaker named Justine also tried to enter the arena during the ceremony, holding a handmade banner coloured in the Italian tricolour reading Mi consenta ("allow me"), potentially a reference to Silvio Berlusconi. She had a drawing by a Roman artist on her exposed skin, supposedly tattooed on. She was removed before she could enter the floor of the stadium and released outside; only after she performed the protest again outside Stadio Olimpico was she brought into the police.

=== Come Play with Us in Vancouver 2010/Venez jouer avec nous en Vancouver 2010 ===
In accordance with the Olympic Charter which governs the closing ceremony, IOC president Jacques Rogge called on the youth of the world to assemble in Vancouver, in four years, for the next Winter Olympics.

Canadian opera star Ben Heppner, himself born in British Columbia, the host province of the next Winter Olympics, sang O Canada to begin the Canadian segment of the ceremonies and mark the beginning of the countdown to the Vancouver Olympic Games in 2010. Heppner sang a version of O Canada which is presented in a combination of Canada's two official languages, English and French, which are also the official languages of the IOC.

Then came the "Oslo Ceremony" (so called because the original Olympic flag, which was used for transfer of the Winter Games, was first used at the 1952 Winter Olympics in Oslo), which is the transfer of the Olympic Flag from the mayor of Turin, Sergio Chiamparino, to Jacques Rogge, and then to the mayor of Vancouver, Sam Sullivan. The flag was kept in the Vancouver City Hall during the next four years. With music playing, Chiamparino ran up the steps to the stage, waved the flag the symbolic eight times, handed it to Rogge, who then handed it to Sullivan. Because Sullivan is a quadriplegic who uses a wheelchair and has limited use of his arms and hands, the flag was placed in a specially designed flag holder on his chair. Sullivan then spun his chair back and forth eight times to make the flag wave in the air. The assembled crowd roared in approval and rose to their feet in response. This culminated this part of the program. The Olympic flag was next raised again at the next Summer Olympic games in Beijing; opening ceremony there took place on 8 August 2008.

The show included a Vancouver-based specially-cast dance corps together with the latest concepts in boarding, skating and skiing. The Montreal-based members of the cast are multi-talented acrobatic performers drawn from Quebec's acclaimed École nationale de cirque (National Circus School), and Les sept doigts de la main, energetically supported by the renowned Cirque du Soleil. In addition, Canadian singer Avril Lavigne performed her song, "Who Knows."

In Ottawa, Prime Minister Stephen Harper, himself from Calgary, the host city of the 1988 Winter Olympics, said in a statement that the Olympic flame had begun its journey to Vancouver.

=== Exit of the Olympic Flag ===
After the Olympic flag was lowered, Piccoli Cantori di Torino sung Va, pensiero while the flag was exiting the stadium.

=== The siege of Turin ===
After Va, pensiero was sung, there was a segment featuring the siege of Turin to commemorate the 300th anniversary.

=== Musical finale ===
Andrea Bocelli performed his song "Because We Believe (Ama Credi E Vai)" before the flame was extinguished; on stage with Andrea appeared 500 Italian brides in white carrying lighted lilies and formed "the Dove of Peace" a formation choreographed by Doug Jack and symbolically "flew" across the stage as the flame took its final moments. The skier Isolde Kostner acted as the last bride to stay on the stage and when she looked at the cauldron, the Olympic fire had their last moments alive. After the end of the fire last breathed, the Italian singer Elisa comes out from the middle of the show cast (she had already sung at the closing ceremony of the 2002 Winter Olympics) and performed their hit song "Luce (Tramonti a nord est)", and Puerto Rican Ricky Martin performed "I Don't Care" and "The Cup of Life".

== Anthems ==
- Piccoli Cantori di Torino – National Anthem of Italy (Note: Anthem played again as part of the Men's 50km mass start free victory ceremony.)
- Seiji Ozawa and New Japan Philharmonic Orchestra – National Anthem of Greece
- Ben Heppner – National Anthem of Canada
- (International Olympic Committee) Olympic Hymn

== Notable attendees ==
Aside from celebrities participating in the ceremonies and members of the International Olympic Committee, the following notable people were in attendance:

=== Dignitaries from International organizations ===
- International Olympic Committee –
  - IOC President Jacques Rogge and wife Anne Rogge
  - Honorary IOC President for Life Juan Antonio Samaranch
  - IOC Members

=== Host country dignitaries ===
- Italy –
  - Prime Minister of Italy Silvio Berlusconi
  - TOROC President Valentino Castellani
  - Mayor of Turin Sergio Chiamparino
  - President and CEO of Ferrari and chairman of FIAT Luca di Montezemolo
  - Member of the Chamber of Deputies Mario Pescante

=== Dignitaries from abroad ===
- Sweden –
  - King of Sweden Carl XVI Gustaf with son, Prince Carl Philip
- Monaco –
  - Prince of Monaco Albert II
  - Andrea Casiraghi, older son of the heir to the throne of Monaco, Caroline, Princess of Hanover
- United States –
  - former Mayor of New York City Rudy Giuliani
  - Italian-American race car driver Mario Andretti
  - U.S. Ambassador to Italy Ronald P. Spogli
  - Chairman of the National Italian American Foundation Dr. A. Kenneth Ciongoli.
- Finland –
  - President of Finland Tarja Halonen
- Canada –
  - Governor General of Canada Michaëlle Jean with spouse Jean-Daniel Lafond and their daughter Marie-Éden.
  - Canadian Minister of Foreign Affairs Peter MacKay
  - Premier of British Columbia Gordon Campbell, the host province of the 2010 Winter Olympics

== Television broadcast ==
In the United States, NBC broadcast the ceremony on tape delay, starting at 7:00 pm EST and PST/6:00 pm CST and MST, and it was one of the broadcasters that did not edit out the intruders interrupting the speeches.

In Canada, CBC and CBC Newsworld broadcasts the ceremony live, starting at 1:00 pm EST, with several replays on both networks throughout the day.

In the UK, the BBC broadcasts the ceremony live, starting at 7:00 pm GMT.

In Australia, the Seven Network broadcasts the ceremony live, starting at 5.30 am AEST.

In Spain, TVE2 broadcast the ceremony.

In Italy, RAI broadcasts the ceremony live at the same time it start started.

== See also ==
- 2006 Winter Olympics opening ceremony
- 2010 Winter Olympics opening ceremony
