= Maria Magnani Noya =

Italian politician (1931–2011)

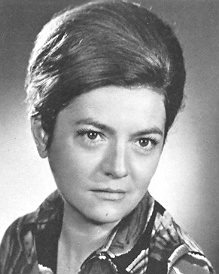

Mayor of Turin
- In office 20 July 1987 – 30 July 1990
- President: Francesco Cossiga
- Preceded by: Giorgio Cardetti
- Succeeded by: Valerio Zanone

Vice-President of the European Parliament
- In office 13 January 1992 – 18 July 1994
- President: Egon Klepsch

Personal details
- Born: 24 October 1931 Genoa, Italy
- Died: 9 December 2011 (aged 80) Turin, Italy
- Party: Italian Socialist Party
- Education: BA in Law

Maria Magnani Noya (24 October 1931 – 9 December 2011) was an Italian lawyer, politician, and former Member of European Parliament. She was the first female mayor of Turin from 1987 to 1990. Noya was a Vice-President of the European Parliament in the Third European Parliament from 1992 to 1994.

== Early life and education ==
Maria Magnani Noya was born on 24 October 1931 in Genoa. Prior to becoming a politician, she earned her Bachelors of Arts in law, becoming a lawyer.

== Career ==
=== Italian Government ===
From April 1980 – June 1981, Noya acted as Undersecretary of Industry, Commerce and Craftmanship in both Francesco Cossiga's second cabinet and Arnaldo Forlani's first cabinet. She then acted as an Undersecretary of Health from June 1981 – December 1982 under Giovanni Spadolini's first and second cabinets. From December 1982 – August 1983, Noya served as Undersecretary of Education in Amintore Fanfani's fifth cabinet.

=== Mayor of Turin ===
Noya was elected mayor by Turin city council on 20 June 1987. Her victory certified her as the first female Mayor of Turin and the second female mayor in Italy, following Elda Pucci of Palermo in 1983.

During the 1990 FIFA World Cup in Italy, Noya asked FIFA to swap the locations of the two semi-final games between England and West Germany, which was set to take place in Turin, and Italy and Argentina, which was set to take place in Milan. She feared English football fans in the city, five years after the Heysel Stadium disaster, where thirty-nine spectators died prior to the 1985 European Cup Final between Juventus and Liverpool F.C. FIFA declined to change the venues citing local police's heavy presence around the stadium and the lack of anticipation of a major incident.

Her term ended in July 1990, after the election of Valerio Zanone.

=== Member of European Parliament ===
Noya was elected as a Member of European Parliament in the 1989 European Parliament elections for North-West Italy.

In January 1992, the European Parliament elected Noya to be one of fourteen Vice-President of the European Parliament on the first round of voting, alongside President Egon Klepsch. Her term ended in July 1994 prior to the session that elected Klaus Hänsch.

== Later life and death ==
Noya celebrated her eightieth birthday at the Sala Rossa along with numerous mayors and councillors, including former mayors Piero Fassino, Diego Novelli, and Valentino Castellani. On 9 December 2011, Noya died at the age of 80 in Turin, Italy. Her funeral was held at 2:00 p.m. in the commune of Rosazza. The Associazione Nazionale Donne Elettrici (ANDE) set up a scholarship in honor of Noya.
