= 2021 Italian local elections =

The 2021 Italian local elections were held on 3 and 4 October. Originally scheduled as usual between 15 April and 15 June with run-offs two weeks later, the Government of Italy announced on 4 March that they were postponed to after the summer due to the COVID-19 pandemic in Italy. Elections took place in 1,293 out of 7,903 municipalities, 20 of which are provincial capitals. Mayors and city councils have been elected for the ordinary five-year terms, lasting till 2026.

== Voting system ==
The voting system is used for all mayoral elections in Italy in the cities with a population higher than 15,000 inhabitants. Under this system, voters express a direct choice for the mayor or an indirect choice voting for the party of the candidate's coalition. If no candidate receives 50% of votes during the first round, the top two candidates go to a second round after two weeks. The winning candidate obtains a majority bonus equal to 60% of seats. During the first round, if no candidate gets more than 50% of votes but a coalition of lists gets the majority of 50% of votes or if the mayor is elected in the first round but its coalition gets less than 40% of the valid votes, the majority bonus cannot be assigned to the coalition of the winning mayor candidate.

The election of the City Council is based on a direct choice for the candidate with a maximum of two preferential votes, each for a different gender, belonging to the same party list: the candidate with the majority of the preferences is elected. The number of the seats for each party is determined proportionally, using D'Hondt seat allocation. Only coalitions with more than 3% of votes are eligible to get any seats.

== Municipal elections ==
=== Mayoral election results ===
Centre-left coalition
Centre-right coalition
Five Star Movement
Civic lists
Centrist coalition
Left-wing coalition
Right-wing coalition

Region	City	Population	Incumbent mayor	Elected mayor	1st round		2nd round		Seats	Source
Region	City	Population	Incumbent mayor	Elected mayor	Votes	%	Votes	%	Seats	Source
Piedmont	Novara	101,916	Alessandro Canelli (Lega)	Alessandro Canelli (Lega)	28,204	69.59	—	—	23 / 32	
Piedmont	Turin	848,196	Chiara Appendino (M5S)	Stefano Lo Russo (PD)	140,200	43.86	168,997	59.23	24 / 40	
Lombardy	Milan	1,397,715	Giuseppe Sala (Ind.)	Giuseppe Sala (Ind.)	277,478	57.73	—	—	31 / 48	
Lombardy	Varese	79,712	Davide Galimberti (PD)	Davide Galimberti (PD)	15,693	48.00	16,741	53.20	20 / 32	
Friuli-Venezia Giulia	Pordenone	51,719	Alessandro Ciriani (Ind.)	Alessandro Ciriani (Ind.)	14,755	65.38	—	—	27 / 40	
Friuli-Venezia Giulia	Trieste	199,773	Roberto Dipiazza (FI)	Roberto Dipiazza (FI)	38,847	46.89	38,816	51.29	24 / 40	
Liguria	Savona	58,566	Ilaria Caprioglio (Ind.)	Marco Russo (Ind.)	11,971	47.79	13,883	62.25	20 / 32	
Emilia-Romagna	Bologna	394,463	Virginio Merola (PD)	Matteo Lepore (PD)	94,565	61.90	—	—	25 / 36	
Emilia-Romagna	Ravenna	157,422	Michele De Pascale (PD)	Michele De Pascale (PD)	39,030	59.47	—	—	22 / 32	
Emilia-Romagna	Rimini	148.688	Andrea Gnassi (PD)	Jamil Sadegholvaad (PD)	33,542	51.32	—	—	20 / 32	
Tuscany	Grosseto	81,488	Antonfrancesco Vivarelli Colonna (Ind.)	Antonfrancesco Vivarelli Colonna (Ind.)	21,235	56.20	—	—	20 / 32	
Lazio	Latina	126,612	Damiano Coletta (IiC)	Damiano Coletta (IiC)	22,469	35.66	30,293	54.90	12 / 32	
Lazio	Rome	2,783,809	Virginia Raggi (M5S)	Roberto Gualtieri (PD)	299,976	27.03	565,352	60.15	29 / 48	
Molise	Isernia	20,945	Giacomo D'Apollonio (FdI)	Piero Castrataro (Ind.)	5,271	41.66	6,442	58.72	20 / 32	
Campania	Benevento	57,456	Clemente Mastella (NC)	Clemente Mastella (NC)	17,684	49.37	15,474	52.68	20 / 32	
Campania	Caserta	73,614	Carlo Marino (PD)	Carlo Marino (PD)	14,394	35.34	15,196	53.65	20 / 32	
Campania	Naples	940,940	Luigi de Magistris (DemA)	Gaetano Manfredi (Ind.)	218,077	62.88	—	—	28 / 40	
Campania	Salerno	130,240	Vincenzo Napoli (PD)	Vincenzo Napoli (PD)	39,323	57.40	—	—	22 / 32	
Calabria	Cosenza	65,209	Mario Occhiuto (FI)	Franz Caruso (PSI)	8,432	23.78	14,413	57.59	20 / 32	
Sardinia	Carbonia	29,301	Paola Massidda (M5S)	Pietro Morittu (PD)	9,721	65.75	—	—	17 / 24	

== See also ==
- 2021 Rome municipal election
- 2021 Milan municipal election
- 2021 Naples municipal election
- 2021 Turin municipal election
- 2021 Bologna municipal election
