= 2016 Turin municipal election =

Mayoral and city election in Turin, Italy

- 5 June 2016 (first round); 19 June 2016 (second round)
- Turnout: 397,811 · 57.18% (▼9.35 pp); 378,586 · 54.41% (N/A)
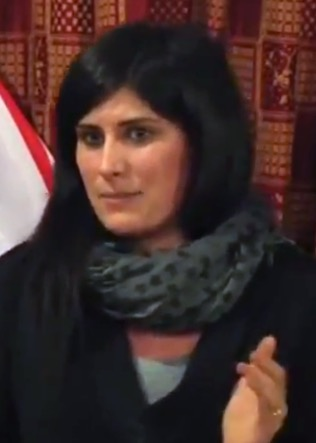

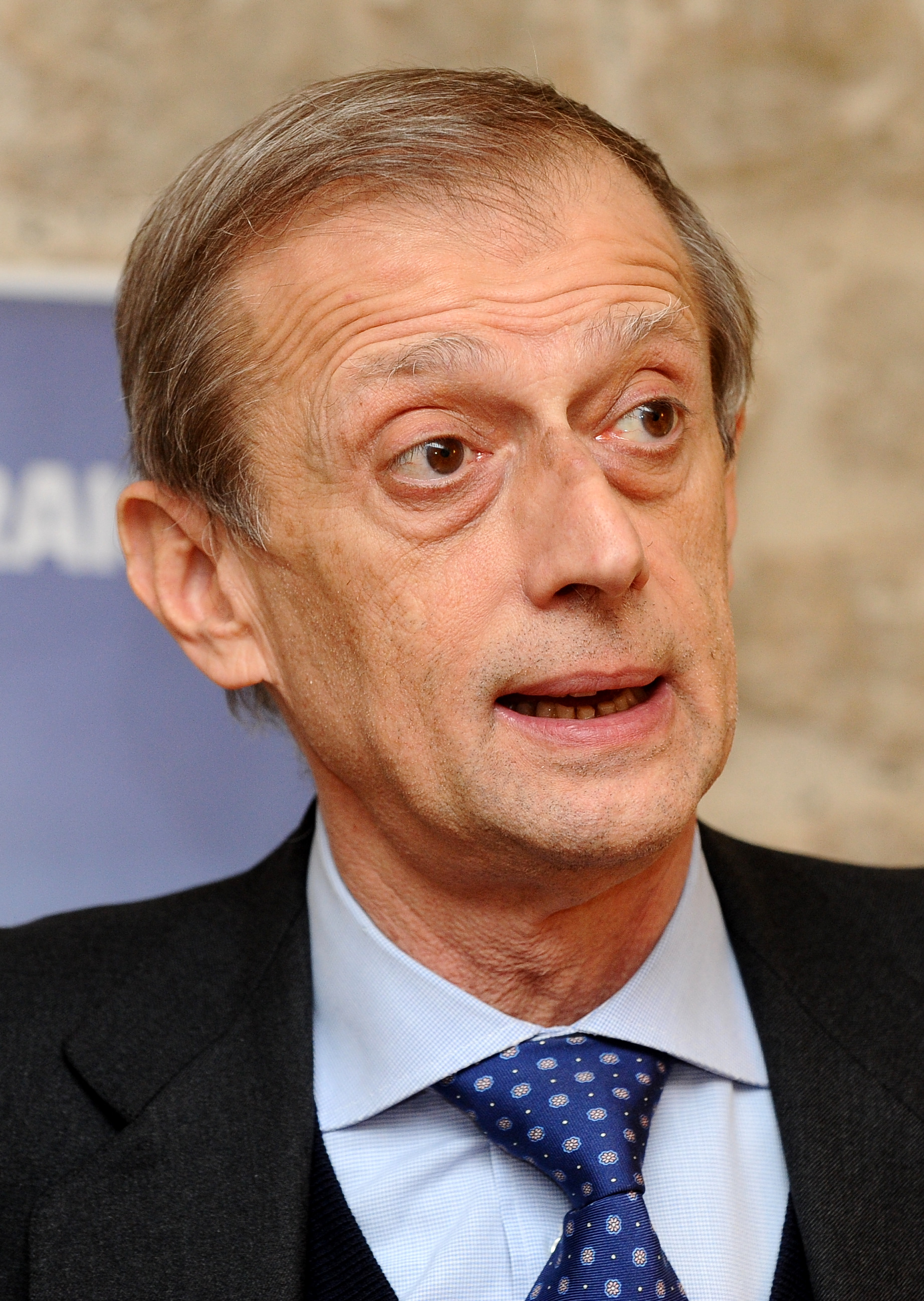
	First party	Second party
Candidate	Chiara Appendino	Piero Fassino
Party	Five Star Movement	Democratic Party
Alliance		Centre-left
Last election	4.97%	56.66%
Seats before	2	24
Seats won	24	11
Seat change	▲22	▼13
Popular vote	118,273; 202,764	160,023; 168,880
Percentage	30.92% 54.56%	41.83% 45.44%
Swing	▲25.65 pp New	▼14.62 pp N/A
Mayor before election
Piero Fassino
Democratic Party
Elected mayor
Chiara Appendino
Five Star Movement

Municipal elections were held in Turin, Piedmont, on 5 June 2016 to elect the mayor of Turin and the 38 members of the City Council of Turin. Chiara Appendino, the candidate of the Five Star Movement (M5S), was elected after defeating the incumbent mayor Piero Fassino in the runoff election on 19 June. As a centre-left coalition stronghold that always elected a centre-left mayor since direct elections began in 1993, Fassino (who finished first in the first round by a comfortable margin) was considered the frontrunner and Appendino's win was an upset. Appendino's win also marked the first win for the M5S in a major Italian city and occurred during a wave of mayoral victories by the M5S in the 2016 Italian local elections. The results were widely reported as a major breakthrough for the M5S, which had previously been seen as a protest party rather than a significant political force.

== Voting system ==
The voting system for the office of mayor of Turin is used for all mayoral elections in Italy in the cities with a population higher than 15,000 inhabitants. Under this system, voters express a direct choice for the mayor or an indirect choice voting for the party of the candidate's coalition. If no candidate receives 50% of votes, the top two candidates go to a second round after two weeks. As a result, the winning candidate can claim majority support, although it is not guaranteed. The election of the City Council of Turin is based on a direct choice for the candidate with a preference vote and the candidate with the majority of the preferences is elected. The number of the seats for each party is determined proportionally.

== Political parties and political candidates ==
Among the main candidates and coalitions that took part to the election were left-wing, centre-left, centrist, centre-right, and right-wing coalitions, plus the M5S.

Political force or alliance	Constituent party or lists	Candidate
Left-wing coalition	Turin in Common (SEL, PRC, PCdI, AET, FaS)	Giorgio Airaudo
Left-wing coalition	Turin Environment (Pos, GI)	Giorgio Airaudo
Left-wing coalition	Civic list	Giorgio Airaudo
Centre-left coalition	Democratic Party (PD)	Piero Fassino
Centre-left coalition	Moderates	Piero Fassino
Centre-left coalition	Civic lists	Piero Fassino
Five Star Movement	Five Star Movement (M5S)	Chiara Appendino
Centrist coalition	Rosso for Mayor (CoR)	Roberto Rosso
Centrist coalition	Union of the Centre – Popular Area (UDC–AP)	Roberto Rosso
Centrist coalition	Democratic Alliance (AD)	Roberto Rosso
Centrist coalition	Moderates in Revolution (MIR)	Roberto Rosso
Centre-right coalition	Forza Italia (FI)	Osvaldo Napoli
Centre-right coalition	Civic lists	Osvaldo Napoli
Right-wing coalition	Northern League (LN)	Alberto Morano
Right-wing coalition	Brothers of Italy (FdI)	Alberto Morano

== Opinion polling ==
=== First round ===
Date	Polling firm	Fassino	Appendino	Morano	Napoli	Airaudo	Rosso	Others	Lead
5 June 2016	Election result	41.8	30.9	8.3	5.3	3.7	5.0	8.7	10.9
18–19 May 2016	IPR	41.0	29.0	9.0	8.0	7.0	3.0	3.0	12.0
17 May 2016	Tecnè	38.5	30.0	9.0	8.0	7.5	1.5	5.0	8.5
16–17 May 2016	IPR	40.0	29.0	9.0	8.0	6.0	2.0	6.0	11.0
9–17 May 2016	Demos&Pi	42.5	23.1	7.3	9.9	7.3	7.5	2.4	19.4
4–6 May 2016	Index Research	39.5	30.0	9.0	8.0	9.0	2.0	2.5	9.5
2–5 May 2016	ScenariPolitici	45.0	25.5	11.5	5.0	8.0	4.0	1.0	19.5
2 May 2016	Tencè	39.0	31.5	9.5	8.5	7.5	2.0	2.0	7.5
20–23 April 2016	ScenariPolitici	47.0	23.0	12.0	5.0	8.0	4.0	1.0	24.0
19 April 2016	Tencè	41.0	30.0	11.0	9.0	7.0	1.0	1.0	11.0

=== Second round ===
Fassino vs. Appendino

Date	Polling firm	Fassino	Appendino	Lead
19 June 2016	Election result	45.4	54.5	9.1
17 May 2016	Tecnè	52.0	48.0	4.0
16–17 May 2016	IPR	51.5	48.5	3.0
9–17 May 2016	Demos&Pi	56.8	43.2	13.6
2–5 May 2016	ScenariPolitici	52.5	47.5	5.0
2 May 2016	Tecnè	51.5	48.5	3.0
20–23 April 2016	ScenariPolitici	54.0	46.0	8.0
19 April 2016	Tecnè	52.0	48.0	4.0

Fassino vs. Morano

Date	Polling firm	Fassino	Morano	Lead
2–5 May 2016	ScenariPolitici	61.0	39.0	22.0
20–23 April 2016	ScenariPolitici	62.0	38.0	24.0

== Results ==
Summary of the 5–19 June 2016 Turin City Council election results
Candidate	First round		Second round		Leader's seats	Political party or party list	Votes	%	Seats
Candidate	Votes	%	Votes	%	Leader's seats	Political party or party list	Votes	%	Seats
Chiara Appendino	118,273	30.92	202,764	54.56	–	Five Star Movement	107,680	30.01	24
Piero Fassino	160,023	41.84	168,880	45.44	check	Democratic Party	106,818	29.77	8
Piero Fassino	160,023	41.84	168,880	45.44	check	Moderates	21,307	5.94	1
Piero Fassino	160,023	41.84	168,880	45.44	check	Fassino List	14,898	4.15	1
Piero Fassino	160,023	41.84	168,880	45.44	check	Left for the City	7,253	2.02	–
Alberto Morano	32,103	8.39	–	–	check	Northern League	20,769	5.79	1
Alberto Morano	32,103	8.39	–	–	check	Brothers of Italy	5,259	1.47	–
Alberto Morano	32,103	8.39	–	–	check	Morano list	4,983	1.39	–
Osvaldo Napoli	20,349	5.32	–	–	check	Forza Italia	16,684	4.65	–
Osvaldo Napoli	20,349	5.32	–	–	check	Let's Save the Ophthalmic	2.435	0.68	–
Osvaldo Napoli	20,349	5.32	–	–	check	A Dream for Turin	567	0.16	–
Roberto Rosso	19,334	5.05	–	–	check	Rosso List	11,339	3.16	–
Roberto Rosso	19,334	5.05	–	–	check	Union of the Centre – Popular Area	5,114	1.43	–
Roberto Rosso	19,334	5.05	–	–	check	Pensioners' Union	1,568	0.44	–
Roberto Rosso	19,334	5.05	–	–	check	Democratic Alliance	409	0.11	–
Roberto Rosso	19,334	5.05	–	–	check	Moderates in Revolution	321	0.09	–
Giorgio Airaudo	14,166	3.70	–	–	check	Turin in Common	10,115	2.82	–
Giorgio Airaudo	14,166	3.70	–	–	check	Turin Environment (Possible – Green Italia)	2,244	0.63	–
Giorgio Airaudo	14,166	3.70	–	–	check	Pensioners and Disabled	1,077	0.30	–
Gianluca Noccetti	5,251	1.37	–	–	–	Piedmont Padanian League	2,937	0.82	–
Gianluca Noccetti	5,251	1.37	–	–	–	4-Legged Friends	1,321	0.37	–
Gianluca Noccetti	5,251	1.37	–	–	–	Forza Toro	484	0.13	–
Gianluca Noccetti	5,251	1.37	–	–	–	Unemployed. Precarious and Exiled	363	0.10	–
Gianluca Noccetti	5,251	1.37	–	–	–	Motorist List	98	0.03	–
Marco Rizzo	3,323	0.87	–	–	–	Communist Party	3,192	0.89	–
Marco Racca	2,082	0.54	–	–	–	CasaPound	1,985	0.55	–
Vitantonio Colucci	2,032	0.53	–	–	–	The People of the Family	1,996	0.56	–
Mario Cornelio Levi	1,337	0.35	–	–	–	Italy of Values	1,327	0.37	–
Anna Battista	980	0.26	–	–	–	It's Enough!	927	0.26	–
Pier Carlo Devoti	915	0.24	–	–	–	The Square	1.089	0.30	–
Roberto Usseglio	690	0.18	–	–	–	New Force	672	0.19	–
Alessio Ariotto	628	0.16	–	–	–	Workers' Communist Party	615	0.17	–
Lorenzo Varaldo	584	0.15	–	–	–	Abrogation!	546	0.15	–
Guglielmo Del Pero	433	0.11	–	–	–	We Are Turin	413	0.12	–
Total	382,503	100.00	371,644	100.00	5		358,805	100.00	35
Source: Ministry of the Interior

Notes

- According to the Italian electoral law of 1993 for the municipalities of Italy, if a defeated candidate for mayor obtains over 3% of votes, the mayoral candidate is automatically elected city councillor (in this case Fassino, Morano, Napoli, Rosso, and Airaudo were all elected). The candidate elected mayor votes on the city council but is not a member of it.

Popular vote
M5S	29.96%
PD	29.78%
M	5.94%
LN	5.77%
FI	4.65%
PF	4.15%
RS	3.40%
TC	2.81%

Mayor (first round)
Fassino	41.83%
Appendino	30.92%
Morano	8.39%
Napoli	5.31%
Rosso	5.05%
Airaudo	3.70%

Mayor (second round)
Appendino	54.56%
Fassino	45.44%

== See also ==
- 2016 Rome municipal election
- Civic list (Italy)
- Elections in Turin
- Opinion polling for the 2016 Italian local elections
