= List of mayors of Turin =

Mayor of Turin
- Sindaco di Torino

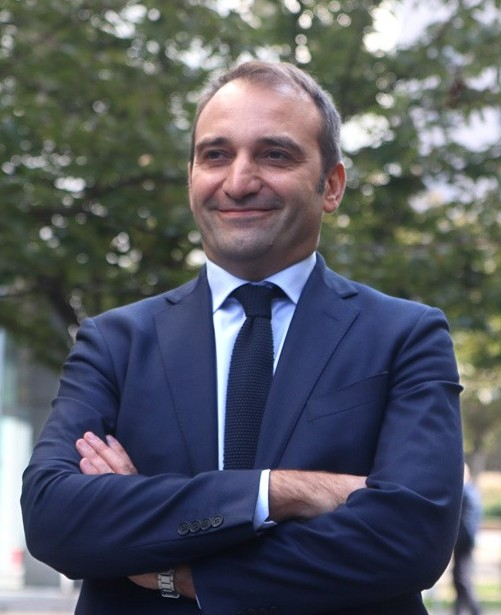
- Incumbent; Stefano Lo Russo since 27 October 2021
- Style: No title or style
- Residence: Palazzo Civico
- Appointer: Electorate of Turin
- Term length: 5 years, renewable once
- Inaugural holder: Luigi de Margherita
- Formation: 31 December 1848
- Deputy: Michela Favaro
- Salary: €62,592 annually
- Website: comune.torino.it/sindaco

The mayor of Turin (Italian: sindaco di Torino) is an elected politician who, along with the Turin City Council of 40 members, is accountable for the government of Turin in the Italian region of Piedmont. The incumbent mayor is Stefano Lo Russo of the Democratic Party who took office on 27 October 2021. The first recognised mayor of Turin was Luigi de Margherita in 1848; the office was preceded by a series of city councils led by two to four annual administrators since 1564. During the Kingdom of Sardinia in the 1840s, the city was ruled by the Moderate Party. Since the unification of Italy in the 1860s, Turin was a stronghold of the Historical Right and later of the Liberals, with a few mayors from the Historical Left. Into the 21st century, Turin is a centre-left coalition stronghold. As of the 2021 Turin municipal election, no centre-right or right-wing mayor was popularly elected in Turin, making Turin one of the most left-leaning cities (among major cities since 1993, only Florence has been always governed by the centre-left coalition), with all mayors being either members of the centre-left or from the Five Star Movement.

During the Fascist Italy period, the mayor of Turin was superseded by a podestà appointed by the Italian fascist regime. With the fall of the Fascist regime in Italy, the mayor of Turin returned to be elected by the Turin City Council, which was in turn elected by the people. Giovanni Roveda of the Italian Communist Party was appointed by the National Liberation Committee in April 1945, with the first post-war municipal election being held in 1946. As with the central government, after Turin was governed by a left-wing coalition between the Communists and the Italian Socialist Party from 1946 to 1951, the office of mayor was mostly held by a member of the post-war ruling party Christian Democracy, which led a centrist coalition until 1970.

In the 1970s, Turin moved to the left and was led by the organic centre-left coalition that had also ruled Italy in the 1960s, with a Socialist elected by the city council to be mayor, becoming the first non-Christian Democrat mayor of Turin, alongside one Italian Liberal Party mayor from 1964 to 1965. From 1975 to 1985, Turin was governed by a left-wing coalition between the Communists and the Socialists, underlining the left-wing shift, with the Communist Diego Novelli serving as mayor. From 1985 to 1990, the city was still led by a Socialist but under the Pentapartito coalition, with one each Liberal, Italian Republican Party, and Italian Democratic Socialist Party member serving as mayor from 1990 to 1992. Starting in 1993, the mayor of Turin began to be directly elected. As in other Italian cities, the mayor either resigned due to the Tangentopoli scandal or to make way for the direct election of the mayor.

The first direct election resulted in a runoff between a left-wing coalition of Novelli led by the Communist Refoundation Party and the centre-left of Valentino Castellani, who came in second in the first round but ultimately won in the runoff. After two close elections in 1997 and 2001 with the centre-right coalition, the centre-left won in a landslide in 2006 (after the mayor's term had been extended from four to five years) under incumbent Sergio Chiamparino and 2011 under new mayor Piero Fassino. In 2016, the centre-left was defeated in an upset by the Five Star Movement candidate Chiara Appendino, who overcame the first-round deficit to become the first female mayor since 1992 and the first to be popularly elected as well as the youngest. In 2021, Appendino did not run for a second term, and the centre-left was returned to the office of mayor, defeating the centre-right in a landslide in the runoff.

== History ==
=== Background and early history ===
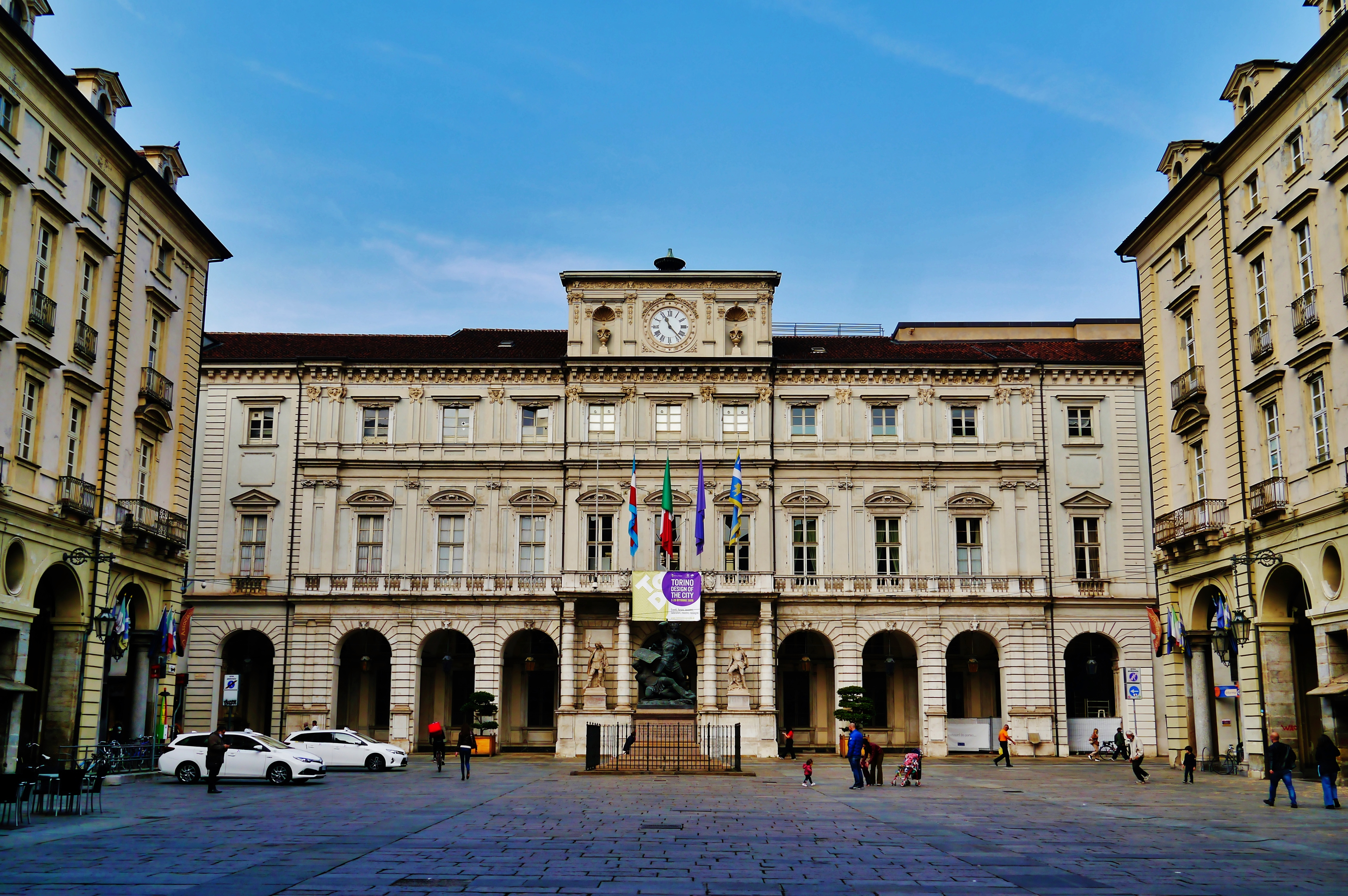
Turin's City Hall

Turin was the capital city of the Kingdom of Sardinia, the legal predecessor of the Kingdom of Italy, of which it served as its first capital. The history of Turin's mayors dates back to the Duchy of Savoy and began in 1564 when two to four members of the aristocratic class were chosen annually as mayors; this lasted until 1800. After a 14-year hiatus under the Napoleonic era, with the two mayors (maires) Ignazio Laugier (1801–1805) and Giovanni Negro (1806–1814), the annually elected mayors returned to office until 1848. From 1814 to 1848, Turin was administrated by a city council (decurionaro) led by two annual syndics (sindici). The office of mayor of Turin (sindaco di Torino) was created by the Kingdom of Sardinia in 1848 after the promulgation of the Albertine Statute. The prominent Moderate Party member Luigi de Margherita is commonly recognised as the first mayor of Turin. It was during this period that the first elections (with partial suffrage) were held under the Albertine Statute. This continued regularly until 1922, with the advent of fascism in Italy.

After the creation of the Kingdom of Italy, the mayor of Turin was elected as continuation of the previous office created during the Kingdom of Sardinia. The fascist dictatorship abolished mayors and city councils in 1926, replacing them with an authoritarian podestà chosen by the National Fascist Party. The office of mayor was restored in 1945 during the Allied occupation of Italy. In these 84 years, the longest-serving mayors among the 19 elected were Teofilo Rossi of the Liberals from June 1909 to June 1917; Melchiorre Voli of the Historical Left from January 1887 to October 1894; and Giovanni Notta of the Moderate Party from January 1853 to February 1860. The only ones to be elected for multiple terms were Secondo Frola of the Historical Right from July 1903 to June 1909 and then from October 1917 to November 1919; and Felice Rignon of the Historical Right from November 1870 to December 1877, then from June 1895 to January 1896, and subsequently a third term from March 1896 to April 1898.

=== Political history and leanings ===
Notable Turinese politicians included Cesare Balbo, Massimo d'Azeglio, Vincenzo Gioberti, and Camillo Benso, Count of Cavour. As part of the history of liberalism in Italy, the city developed a tradition of liberalism, from liberal conservatism to conservative liberalism, and moderate conservatism through the Moderate Party and the Historical Right. Into the 20th century, particularly in the late 1910s and early 1920s, socialism and communism took their roots in the city and Turin was a significant part of the Biennio Rosso, with several leaders of L'Ordine Nuovo and the Communist Party of Italy, including Antonio Gramsci, Palmiro Togliatti, and Amedeo Bordiga, residing in Turin. During the Fascist Italy era, Turin was notable for its anti-fascism (for example, the journalist and intellectual Piero Gobetti, and Turin was among the cities decorated for military valor during the Liberation of Italy with a Gold Medal of Military Valor) and Fiat automotive industry, both of which earned the hatred of Italian fascist leader Benito Mussolini, who spoke of "the dirty city of Turin". With the fall of the Fascist regime in Italy and the advent of the first Italian Republic, the National Liberation Committee (CLN) through the Italian Communist Party and the Italian Socialist Party governed the city of Turin with a red executive (giunta rossa).

The Communists were the largest and most voted party in 1946. By 1951, Christian Democracy was the most voted party and began to hold the office of mayor for decades, with the exception of one from the Italian Liberal Party (Luciano Jona) in 1964–1965 and one from the Italian Socialist Party (Guido Secreto) in 1973. Turin often followed or reflected the governing coalition of the national government, initially through the Italian system of centrism (Christian Democracy with the support of the Italian Democratic Socialist Party, the Italian Liberal Party, and the Movement for Piedmontese Regional Autonomy), and later with the organic centre-left (with the addition of the Italian Socialist Party) and Pentapartito (with the addition of the Italian Republican Party) coalitions. Within the city's history of the Italian Republic, the ten years of Communist–Socialist government between 1975 and 1985 were among the most significative and transformative years. As with other cities, it was affected by the transition into the second Italian Republic through Mani pulite.

Into the 21st century, Turin is one of the strongholds of the centre-left coalition, which won all but one election since 1993 (alongside Naples among major cities), with five wins in a row and the centre-left doing better only in Florence (among major cities) where it won all direct elections since 1995. Although Turin is not considered as left-wing as Bologna, Florence, and other more left-leaning strongholds due to narrow centre-left wins in 1997 and 2001 and the significant influence of moderates, it has a long tradition of left-wing, communist, and socialist politics dating back to the post-war period, with the Italian Communist Party resulting the most voted party from 1970 to 1990. For example, Milan, which also had a strong socialist tradition, was for a time a stronghold of the centre-right coalition. Even as Piedmont (among the most representative Italian regions of national politics) shifted to the right in the late 2010s and early 2020s, Turin remained to the left. As with Naples, which saw a turn to the left in the 2010s under the mayor Luigi de Magistris, Appendino's win was to a certain extant a similar shift to the left and a dissatisfaction with the centre-left that did not entail support for the centre-right. Although at that time the Five Star Movement was not left-wing in the sense that it rejected the left–right political spectrum, Appendino's career began within the local section of Left Ecology Freedom and was a supporter of Nichi Vendola, and in subsequent years maintained a progressive profile similar to that of the anti-establishment left, which is critical of alliances with the Democratic Party. As of the 2021 Italian local elections in Turin, no centre-right or right-wing mayor was elected, with all mayors being members of the centre-left (through its various incarnations such as the Alliance of Progressives and The Olive Tree or through its main parties such as the Democratic Party of the Left, the Democrats of the Left, and the Democratic Party) or the Five Star Movement.

=== From the Italian miracle to the post-industry era ===
From 1946 to 1993, the mayor was elected by the Turin City Council. The influential trade unionist and anti-fascist activist Giovanni Roveda, a member of the Italian Communist Party who was elected as mayor by the CLN on 28 April 1945 and served until 17 December 1946, led to the first universal suffrage election of the city council, which elected the Communist Celeste Negarville, who served from December 1946 to April 1948. In the post-war years, Turin was rapidly rebuilt, which helped Italy underwent an economic miracle in the 1950s and 1960s. Amedeo Peyron of Christian Democracy was the longest-serving mayor during this period, having led Turin from July 1951 to February 1962. Turin was a significant part of the Italian miracle. The city's automotive industry, led by Fiat, played a pivotal role in the Italian economic boom of these decades, which saw a shift to the left. The organic-centre left coalition of the 1970s was followed by a left-wing government led by Diego Novelli in 1975. After the end of the 10-year Novelli government in 1985, the Italian Socialist Party led a Pentapartito coalition, which ruled until 1992 before the appointment by the prefecture of a special commissioner.

Among the 20 mayors since the war, only two were women: the Italian Socialist Party member Maria Magnani Noya from July 1987 to July 1990 and the Italian Republican Party member Giovanna Cattaneo Incisa from February to December 1992. The early 1990s proved to be turbulent years. Cattaneo Incisa followed the rule of Italian Liberal Party member Valerio Zanone, who governed from July 1990 until his resignation in December 1991. This resulted in the appointment of Baldassarre Furnari of the Italian Democratic Socialist Party between January and February 1992 to lead the local caretaker government, before Cattaneo Incisa was elected mayor. Since 1993, under provisions of new local administration law, the mayor of Turin is chosen by direct election, originally every four then every five years. The office of the deputy mayor of Turin was officially created in 1993 with the adoption of the new local administration law. The deputy mayor is nominated and eventually dismissed by the mayor, and can hold several responsibilities. For example, Michela Favaro, the incumbent deputy mayor, was given responsibility for Personnel, Property, Legality, and Procurement.

Valentino Castellani was the first popularly elected mayor of Turin as part of the centre-left coalition, starting a series of centre-left wins, including one against a left-wing coalition led by the Communist Refoundation Party (1993), two narrow wins thanks to the support of the Communist Refoundation Party and the Party of Italian Communists (1997 and 2001), and two landslide victories in the first round (2006 and 2011). His administration focused on transforming Turin from an industrial city to a more diverse European hub, involving various stakeholders in governance, and oversaw both significant urban transformation as Turin moved beyond its industrial past and the successful candidacy of Turin for the 2006 Winter Olympics. Economically, Castellani's aim was to reduce the city's economic and perceived image-impairing dependence on Fiat (what was called the industrial monoculture) and promote development in other sectors, primarily the tertiary sector and cultural activities. In this area, results fell short of expectations and Sergio Chiamparino, Castellani's successor, attempted to refocus attention on the automotive industry's role in the city's economy. Chiamparino was succeeded in 2011 by Piero Fassino, who followed a similar line to Castellani. In an upset, Chiara Appendino of the Five Star Movement was elected in 2016, overturning Fassino's lead in the runoff. Due to the COVID-19 pandemic in Italy, she remained in office for around four more months in 2021 after her original term had expired (October rather than June).

In addition to Fiat and automotive politics, Turinese politics was affected by the Turin–Lyon high-speed railway (TAV) and the No TAV movement. Appendino became the first woman to be popularly elected as mayor of Turin, the first since 1992 and the youngest, and the second elected mayor of a major city for the anti-establishment and populist Five Star Movement (Virginia Raggi was elected mayor of Rome on the same day as Appendino but was sworn in on 22 June compared to Appendino's on 30 June), which in the 2016 Italian local elections underwent a successful wave of mayors elected, including in Rome with Raggi. At that time, the Five Star Movement defined itself as neither left nor right, and won the mayoralty in part due to left-wing dissatisfaction. Although Appendino's concerns included a balanced budget, resulting in a series of cuts, she enacted a series of progressive reforms, most notably legally recognising same-sex families (a first in Italy). She also oversaw the candidacy of Turin (alongside Milan and Cortina d'Ampezzo) for the 2026 Winter Olympics, which ultimately collapsed after Appendino withdrew it in a polemic with CONI over the lack of sports assigned to Turin, the organisation of the ATP Finals (2021–2026), and a series of funds allocations from the Italian government. Appendino did not run for a second term in the 2021 election, which was postponed by a few months due to the COVID-19 pandemic and returned the centre-left to power, with an increased presence of the left within the centre-left coalition; unlike other cities and regions where the Democratic Party and the Five Star Movement are allies as part of the Progressive Camp, the Five Star Movement went back to the opposition. The incumbent mayor Stefano Lo Russo, a university professor of Geology who is a member of the Catholic wing of the Democratic Party, was elected mayor with a significant margin in the runoff against the centre-right coalition candidate.

== List of mayors ==
=== Kingdom of Sardinia (1814–1848) ===
Syndics	Term start	Term end	Party
Paolo Mazzetti di Saluggia; Giovanni Battista Arbaudi	1 January 1814	31 December 1815	Legitimist
Bernardo Ripa di Meana; Giulio Marenco di Moriondo	1 January 1816	31 December 1816	Legitimist
Michele Provana del Sabbione; Saverio Morelli	1 January 1817	31 December 1817	None
Agostino Lascaris di Ventimiglia; Giuseppe Cavalli	1 January 1818	31 December 1818	None
Michele Provana del Sabbione; Luigi Bertalazone di San Fermo	1 January 1819	31 December 1819	None
Enrico Seyssel d'Aix; Giuseppe Sobrero	1 January 1820	31 December 1820	None
Luigi Coardi Bagnasco; Gaetano Calliani	1 January 1821	31 December 1821	None
Giuseppe Provana di Collegno; Giuseppe Adami di Bergolo	1 January 1822	31 December 1822	None
Domenico Rovero di Piobesi; Giuseppe Gaetano Rignon	1 January 1823	31 December 1823	None
Carlo Perrone di San Martino; Pietro Gay di Quarti	1 January 1824	31 December 1824	None
Cesare Romagnano di Virle; Edoardo Tholozan	1 January 1825	31 December 1825	None
Tancredi Farletti di Barolo; Davide Revelly	1 January 1826	31 December 1827	None
Giacomo Asinari di Bernezzo; Luigi Francesetti di Hautecourt e Mezzenile	1 January 1828	31 December 1828	None
Luigi Nomis di Cossilla; Luigi Ricciolio	1 January 1829	31 December 1829	None
Giuseppe Provana di Collegno; Gerolamo Cravosio	1 January 1830	31 December 1831	None
Enrico Seyssel d'Aix; Ignazio Michelotti	1 January 1832	31 December 1832	None
Michele Benso di Cavour; Giuseppe Villa	1 January 1833	31 December 1834	None
Carlo Pallio di Rinco; Luca Martin di San Martino	1 January 1835	31 December 1835	None
Luigi Mola di Larissé; Giovanni Ignazio Pansoya	1 January 1836	31 December 1836	None
Carlo Nicolis di Robilant; Amedeo Chiavarina di Rubiana	1 January 1837	31 December 1837	None
Carlo Cacherano d'Osasco; Giuseppe Bosco di Ruffino	1 January 1838	31 December 1838	None
Carlo Galli della Loggia; Luigi Rostagno di Villaretto	1 January 1839	31 December 1839	None
Giuseppe Pochettini di Serravalle; Ignazio Marchetti Melina	1 January 1840	31 December 1840	None
Paolo Gazzelli di Rossana; Pietro Villanis	1 January 1841	31 December 1841	None
Antonio Nomis di Pollone; Angelo Borbonese	1 January 1842	31 December 1843	None
Cesare Romagnano di Virle; Giuseppe Ponte di Pino	1 January 1844	31 December 1844	None
Giuseppe Pochettini di Serravalle; Giuseppe Bosco di Ruffino	1 January 1845	31 December 1845	None
Vittorio Colli di Felizzano; Giovanni Nigra	1 January 1846	31 December 1848	None

=== Kingdom of Sardinia (1848–1861) ===
	Mayor	Term start	Term end	Party
1	Luigi de Margherita	31 December 1848	7 April 1849	Moderate
2	Carlo Pinchia	7 April 1849	1 February 1850	Moderate
3	Giorgio Bellono	1 February 1850	1 January 1853	Moderate
4	Giovanni Notta	1 January 1853	3 February 1860	Moderate
5	Augusto Nomis di Cossilla	3 February 1860	26 December 1861	Moderate

=== Kingdom of Italy (1861–1946) ===
	Mayor	Term start	Term end	Party
Appointed by the King of Italy (1861–1889)
6	Emanuele Luserna di Rorà	26 December 1861	1 January 1866	Right
7	Giovanni Filippo Galvagno	1 January 1866	1 April 1869	None
8	Cesare Valperga di Masino	1 April 1869	20 November 1870	Right
9	Felice Rignon	20 November 1870	19 January 1878	Right
10	Luigi Ferraris	19 January 1878	28 March 1883	Right
11	Ernesto Balbo Bertone di Sambuy	28 March 1883	1 January 1887	Right
Elected by the City Council of Turin (1889–1926)
12	Melchiorre Voli	1 January 1887	26 June 1895	Left
(9)	Felice Rignon	26 June 1895	13 April 1898	Right
13	Severino Casana	13 April 1898	26 September 1902	Left
14	Alfonso Badini Confalonieri	26 September 1902	6 July 1903	Left
15	Secondo Frola	6 July 1903	28 July 1909	Right
16	Teofilo Rossi	28 July 1909	15 June 1917	Liberals
17	Leopoldo Usseglio	15 June 1917	17 October 1917	Liberals
(15)	Secondo Frola	17 October 1917	24 November 1919	Liberals
18	Riccardo Cattaneo	19 November 1920	2 July 1923	Liberals
–	Donato Etna	26 June 1925	4 December 1926	Commissioner
Fascist Podestà (1926–1945)
–	Luigi Balbo Bertone di Sambuy	4 December 1926	11 September 1928	Commissioner
–	Umberto Ricci	11 September 1928	11 February 1929	Commissioner
1	Paolo Ignazio Maria Thaon di Revel	11 February 1929	4 February 1935	PNF
2	Ugo Sartirana	4 February 1935	25 June 1938	PNF
3	Cesare Giovara	25 June 1938	24 August 1939	PNF
4	Matteo Bonino	24 August 1939	18 August 1943	PNF
19	Bruno Villabruna	18 August 1943	20 September 1943	PLI (Note: Nominated by the first Badoglio government)
(4)	Matteo Bonino	22 September 1943	2 December 1944	PFR (Note: Nominated as prefectural commissioner under the Italian Social Republic, a puppet state of Nazi Germany, after the German occupation of Italy)
5	Michele Fassio	2 December 1944	25 April 1945	PFR
Allied occupation (1945–1946)
20	Giovanni Roveda	28 April 1945	17 December 1946	PCI (Note: Nominated by the prefect with the support of the National Liberation Committee)

=== Italian Republic (since 1946) ===
==== City Council election (1946–1993) ====
	Mayor	Term start	Term end	Party	Coalition	Election
1	Celeste Negarville	17 December 1946	13 May 1948	PCI	PCI • PSI (Red Executive)	1946
2	Domenico Coggiola	13 May 1948	16 July 1951	PCI	PCI • PSI (Red Executive)	1946
3	Amedeo Peyron	16 July 1951	26 February 1962	DC	DC • PSDI • PLI • MARP (Centrism)	1951
3	Amedeo Peyron	16 July 1951	26 February 1962	DC	DC • PSDI • PLI • MARP (Centrism)	1956
3	Amedeo Peyron	16 July 1951	26 February 1962	DC	DC • PSDI • PLI • MARP (Centrism)	1960
4	Giovanni Carlo Anselmetti	26 February 1962	21 October 1964	DC	DC • PSDI • PLI • MARP (Centrism)	1960
5	Luciano Jona	21 October 1964	20 February 1965	PLI	DC • PSDI • PLI • MARP (Centrism)	1960
6	Giuseppe Grosso	20 February 1965	9 September 1968	DC	DC • PSDI • PLI • MARP (Centrism)	1964
7	Andrea Guglielminetti	9 September 1968	22 July 1970	DC	DC • PSDI • PLI • MARP (Centrism)	1964
8	Giovanni Porcellana	22 July 1970	12 April 1973	DC	DC • PSI • PSDI • PRI (Organic centre-left)	1970
9	Guido Secreto	12 April 1973	5 December 1973	PSI	DC • PSI • PSDI • PRI (Organic centre-left)	1970
10	Giovanni Picco	5 December 1973	14 July 1975	DC	DC • PSI • PSDI • PRI (Organic centre-left)	1970
11	Diego Novelli	14 July 1975	25 January 1985	PCI	PCI • PSI (Red Executive)	1975
11	Diego Novelli	14 July 1975	25 January 1985	PCI	PCI • PSI (Red Executive)	1980
12	Giorgio Cardetti	25 January 1985	20 July 1987	PSI	PCI • PSI (Red Executive)	
12	Giorgio Cardetti	25 January 1985	20 July 1987	PSI	DC • PSI • PLI • PSDI • PRI (Pentapartito)	1985
13	Maria Magnani Noya	20 July 1987	30 July 1990	PSI	DC • PSI • PLI • PSDI • PRI (Pentapartito)	1985
14	Valerio Zanone	30 July 1990	31 December 1991	PLI	DC • PSI • PLI • PSDI • PRI (Pentapartito)	1990
15	Baldassarre Furnari	1 January 1992	11 February 1992	PSDI	DC • PSI • PLI • PSDI • PRI (Pentapartito)	1990
16	Giovanna Cattaneo Incisa	11 February 1992	14 December 1992	PRI	DC • PSI • PLI • PSDI • PRI (Pentapartito)	1990
–	Riccardo Malpica	14 December 1992	24 June 1993	None	Prefectural commissioner (Note: Nominated by the prefect after the mayor and the members of the City Council resigned in order to hold a new election under the provision of the new local electoral law)	–

==== Direct election (since 1993) ====
	Mayor	Took office	Left office	Party	Coalition	Election
17	Valentino Castellani (born 1940)	24 June 1993	12 May 1997	None	Alliance of Progressives (PDS–AD–FdV)	1993
17	Valentino Castellani (born 1940)	12 May 1997	28 May 2001	None	The Olive Tree (PDS–PRC–AD–PPI–FdV)	1997
18	Sergio Chiamparino (born 1948)	28 May 2001	30 May 2006	DS; PD	The Olive Tree (DL–DS–PdCI–FdV)	2001
18	Sergio Chiamparino (born 1948)	30 May 2006	16 May 2011	DS; PD	The Olive Tree (Ulivo–PRC–Mod–PdCI)	2006
19	Piero Fassino (born 1949)	16 May 2011	20 June 2016	PD	PD • Mod • SEL • IdV	2011
20	Chiara Appendino (born 1984)	20 June 2016	27 October 2021	M5S	M5S	2016
21	Stefano Lo Russo (born 1975)	27 October 2021 (Note: Election originally scheduled for June 2021 then postponed due to the COVID-19 pandemic in Italy)	Incumbent	PD	PD • SE • Mod	2021

===== List of deputy mayors =====
	Deputy mayor	Term start	Term end	Party	Mayor
1	Guido Brosio	5 July 1993	12 May 1997	AD	Castellani
2	Domenico Carpanini	20 May 1997	28 February 2001 (Note: Died in office)	PDS	Castellani
3	Marco Calgaro	28 June 2001	30 May 2006	DL	Chiamparino
4	Tommaso Dealessandri	13 June 2006	16 May 2011	PD	Chiamparino
4	Tommaso Dealessandri	2 June 2011	16 July 2013 (Note: Resigned)	PD	Fassino
5	Elide Tisi	16 July 2013	20 June 2016	PD	Fassino
6	Guido Montanari	1 July 2016	15 July 2019 (Note: Dismissed by the mayor)	M5S	Appendino
7	Sonia Schellino	29 July 2019	27 October 2021	M5S	Appendino
8	Michela Favaro	28 October 2021	Incumbent	PD	Lo Russo

== Elections ==
=== Mayoral and City Council election, 1993 ===
The election took place in two rounds: the first on 6 June, the second on 20 June 1993.

Results

Summary of the 1993 Turin City Council election results
Parties and coalitions		Votes	%	Seats
Communist Refoundation Party	PRC	63,842	14.65%	5
The Network	LR	30,890	7.09%	2
Green Alliance	AV	15,034	3.45%	1
Pensioners' Party	PP	5,890	1.35%	0
Novelli coalition (left-wing)		115,656	26.54%	8
Lega Nord	LN	102,045	23.41%	7
Democratic Party of the Left	PDS	41,553	9.53%	14
Democratic Alliance	AD	31,366	7.20%	10
Federation of the Greens	FdV	18,034	4.14%	6
Castellani coalition (centre-left)		90,953	20.87%	(Note: As a result of the majority bonus granted by the electoral law to the candidate who wins the runoff if no coalition reaches more than 50% of the votes in the first round)30
Christian Democracy	DC	54,230	12.44%	4
Italian Liberal Party	PLI	11,697	2.68%	0
Zanetti coalition (centre)		65,927	15.13%	4
Italian Social Movement	MSI	25,555	5.86%	1
Others		35,679	8.19%	0
Total		435,815	100%	50
Votes cast/turnout		639,386	77.08%	
Registered voters		829,491		
Source: Ministry of the Interior

Candidate	Party	Coalition	First round		Second round	
Candidate	Party	Coalition	Votes	%	Votes	%
Diego Novelli	LR	PRC–LR–AV–PP	217,506	36.12	208,596	42.68
Valentino Castellani	None	PDS–AD–FdV	122,423	20.33	280,092	57.32
Domenico Comino	LN		117,410	19.50		
Giovanni Zanetti	DC	DC–PLI	79,050	13.13		
Ugo Martinat	MSI		27,798	4.62		
Others			38,014	6.32		
Eligible voters			829,491	100.00	829,491	100.00
Voted			639,386	77.08	514,779	62.06
Blank or invalid ballots			37,185		26,091	
Total valid votes			602,201		488,688	

=== Mayoral and City Council election, 1997 ===
The election took place in two rounds: the first on 27 April, the second on 11 May 1997.

Results

Summary of the 1997 Turin City Council election results
Parties and coalitions		Votes	%	Seats
Democratic Party of the Left	PDS	85,857	18.97%	14
Communist Refoundation Party (Note: Officially endorsed the centre-left coalition candidate only in the second round)	PRC	53,536	11.83%	8
Democratic Alliance	AD	30,580	6.76%	5
Italian People's Party	PPI	17,470	3.86%	2
Federation of the Greens	FdV	12,101	2.67%	1
Pensioners' Party	PP	4,514	1.00%	0
Castellani coalition (centre-left)		204,508	(Note: 150,972 votes, or 33.26%, without the Communist Refoundation Party in the first round)45.09%	(Note: As a result of the majority bonus granted by the electoral law to the candidate who wins the runoff if no coalition reaches more than 50% of the votes in the first round)30
Forza Italia	FI	123,622	27.32%	12
National Alliance	AN	42,874	9.47%	4
Christian Democratic Centre	CCD	21,291	4.70%	2
Others		6,890	1.52%	0
Costa coalition (centre-right)		194,977	43.02%	18
Lega Nord	LN	30,516	6.74%	2
Others		23,273	4.34%	0
Total		452,524	100%	50
Votes cast/turnout		587,636	73.68%	
Registered voters		797,552		
Source: Ministry of the Interior

Candidate	Party	Coalition	First round		Second round	
Candidate	Party	Coalition	Votes	%	Votes	%
Raffaele Costa	FI	Pole for Freedoms	240,259	43.32	268,213	49.60
Valentino Castellani	None	The Olive Tree	196,361	35.40	272,506	50.40
Eleonora Artesio	PRC		54,070	9.75		
Domenico Comino	LN		35,928	6.48		
Others			28,036	5.05		
Eligible voters			797,552	100.00	797,552	100.00
Voted			587,636	73.68	555,286	69.62
Blank or invalid ballots			32,982		14,567	
Total valid votes			554,654		540,719	

=== Mayoral and City Council election, 2001 ===
The election took place in two rounds: the first on 13 May, the second on 27 May 2001.

Results

Summary of the 2001 Turin City Council election results
Parties and coalitions		Votes	%	Seats
Forza Italia	FI	154,773	32.27%	15
National Alliance	AN	37,413	7.80%	3
Lega Nord	LN	11,259	2.35%	1
Christian Democratic Centre	CCD	8,968	1.87%	0
Others		15,523	3.24%	0
Rosso coalition (centre-right)		227,954	47.53%	19
The Daisy	DL	88,832	18.43%	14
Democrats of the Left	DS	80,759	16.84%	13
Party of Italian Communists	PdCI	12,274	2.56%	2
Federation of the Greens	FdV	6,356	1.33%	1
Others		7,049	1.47%	0
Chiamparino coalition (centre-left)		194,820	40.62%	(Note: As a result of the majority bonus granted by the electoral law to the candidate who wins the runoff if no coalition reaches more than 50% of the votes in the first round)30
Communist Refoundation Party	PRC	17,002	3.54%	1
Others		38,863	8.21%	0
Total		479,639	100%	50
Votes cast/turnout		637,160	82.57%	
Registered voters		771,683		
Source: Ministry of the Interior

Candidate	Party	Coalition	First round		Second round	
Candidate	Party	Coalition	Votes	%	Votes	%
Sergio Chiamparino	DS	The Olive Tree	269,435	44.90	285,991	52.82
Roberto Rosso	FI	House of Freedoms	266,704	44.44	255,450	47.18
Others			63,977	10.66		
Eligible voters			771,683	100.00	771,683	100.00
Voted			637,160	82.57	550,947	71.40
Blank or invalid ballots			37,044		9,506	
Total valid votes			600,116		541,441	

=== Mayoral and City Council election, 2006 ===
The election took place on 28–29 May 2006.

Results

Summary of the 2006 Turin City Council election results
Parties and coalitions		Votes	%	Seats
The Olive Tree	Ulivo	152,162	39.47%	23
Communist Refoundation Party	PRC	30,254	7.85%	4
Moderates	Mod	15,236	3.95%	2
Party of Italian Communists	PdCI	11,894	3.09%	1
Others		35,687	9.26%	3
Chiamparino coalition (centre-left)		245,233	63.62%	33
Forza Italia	FI	56,319	14.61%	8
National Alliance	AN	32,724	8.49%	5
Union of the Centre	UDC	19,391	5.03%	3
Lega Nord	LN	9,549	2.48%	1
Others		5,985	1.55%	0
Buttiglione coalition (centre-right)		123,968	32.16%	17
Others		16,279	4.22%	0
Total		385,480	100%	50
Votes cast/turnout		477,038	64.74%	
Registered voters		736,892		
Source: Ministry of the Interior

Candidate	Party	Coalition	First round	
Candidate	Party	Coalition	Votes	%
Sergio Chiamparino	DS	The Olive Tree	307,915	66.60
Rocco Buttiglione	UDC	House of Freedoms	136,138	29.45
Others			18,278	3.95
Eligible voters			736,892	100.00
Voted			477,038	64.74
Blank or invalid ballots			14,707	
Total valid votes			462,331	

=== Mayoral and City Council election, 2011 ===
The election took place on 15–16 May 2011.

Results

Summary of the 2011 Turin City Council election results
Parties and coalitions		Votes	%	Seats
Democratic Party	PD	138,103	34.50%	16
Moderates	Mod	36,267	9.06%	4
Left Ecology Freedom	SEL	22,647	5.66%	2
Italy of Values	IdV	19,055	4.76%	2
Others		10.075	2.51%	0
Fassino coalition (centre-left)		226,147	56.50%	24
The People of Freedom	PdL	73,197	18.29%	8
Lega Nord	LN	27,451	6.86%	3
The Right	LD	2,396	0.60%	0
Others		4,395	1.09%	0
Coppola coalition (centre-right)		107,439	26.84%	11
Five Star Movement	M5S	21,078	5.27%	2
Union of the Centre & allies	UDC	20,655	5.16%	2
Talking Cricket List & allies	LGP	14,517	3.63%	1
Others		10,421	2.59%	0
Total		400,257	100%	40
Votes cast/turnout		470,946	66.53%	
Registered voters		707,817		
Source: Ministry of the Interior

Candidate	Party	Coalition	First round	
Candidate	Party	Coalition	Votes	%
Piero Fassino	PD	PD–Mod–SEL–IdV	255,242	56.66
Michele Coppola	PdL	PdL–LN–LD	122,982	27.30
Vittorio Bertola	M5S		22,403	4.97
Alberto Musy	UDC	UDC–FLI	21,896	4.86
Others			27,951	6.20
Eligible voters			707,817	100.00
Voted			470,946	66.53
Blank or invalid ballots			20,472	
Total valid votes			450,474	

=== Mayoral and City Council election, 2016 ===
The election took place in two rounds: the first on 5 June, the second on 19 June 2016.

Results

Summary of the 2016 Turin City Council election results
Parties and coalitions		Votes	%	Seats
Democratic Party	PD	106,818	29.77%	9
Moderates	Mod	21,307	5.94%	1
Fassino List	LF	14,898	4.15%	1
Left for the City	SpC	7,253	2.02%	0
Fassino coalition (centre-left)		150,276	41.88%	11
Five Star Movement	M5S	107,680	30.01%	(Note: As a result of the majority bonus granted by the electoral law to the candidate who wins the runoff if no coalition reaches more than 50% of the votes in the first round)24
Lega Nord	LN	20,769	5.79%	2
Brothers of Italy	FdI	5,259	1.47%	0
Others		4,983	1.39%	0
Morano coalition (right-wing)		31,011	8.64%	2
Forza Italia & allies	FI	19,686	5.49%	1
Union of the Centre & allies	UDC	18,751	5.23%	1
Turin in Common & allies	TiC	13,436	3.74%	1
Others		17,965	5.01%	0
Total		358,805	100%	40
Votes cast/turnout		397,811	57.18%	
Registered voters		695,740		
Source: Ministry of the Interior

Candidate	Party	Coalition	First round		Second round	
Candidate	Party	Coalition	Votes	%	Votes	%
Piero Fassino	PD	PD–Mod–LF–SpC	160,023	41.84	168,880	45.44
Chiara Appendino	M5S		118,273	30.92	202,764	54.56
Alberto Morano	LN	LN–FdI	32,103	8.39		
Osvaldo Napoli	FI		20,349	5.32		
Roberto Rosso	UDC		19,334	5.05		
Giorgio Airaudo	SEL	SEL–PRC	14,166	3.70		
Others			18,225	4.78		
Eligible voters			695,740	100.00	695,740	100.00
Voted			397,811	57.18	378,586	54.41
Blank or invalid ballots			15,308		6,492	
Total valid votes			382,503		371,544	

=== Mayoral and City Council election, 2021 ===
The election took place in two rounds: the first on 3–4 October, the second on 17–18 October 2021.

Results

Summary of the 2021 Turin City Council election results
Parties and coalitions		Votes	%	Seats
Democratic Party	PD	85,890	28.56%	17
Lo Russo List	LR	15,013	4.99%	2
Ecologist Left	SE	10,807	3.59%	2
Moderates	Mod	10,177	3.38%	2
Others		10,367	3.45%	1
Lo Russo coalition (centre-left)		132,254	43.97%	(Note: As a result of the majority bonus granted by the electoral law to the candidate who wins the runoff if no coalition reaches more than 50% of the votes in the first round)24
Beautiful Turin	TB	35,658	11.86%	5
Brothers of Italy	FdI	31,490	10.47%	3
League	Lega	29,593	9.84%	3
Forza Italia–Union of the Centre	FI–UDC	15,951	5.30%	2
Others		4,861	1.61%	0
Damilano coalition (centre-right)		117,553	39.08%	13
Five Star Movement & allies	M5S	26,769	8.90%	3
Others		24,207	8.05%	0
Total		300,783	100%	40
Votes cast/turnout		331,556	48.08%	
Registered voters		689,684		
Source: Ministry of the Interior

Candidate	Party	Coalition	First round		Second round	
Candidate	Party	Coalition	Votes	%	Votes	%
Stefano Lo Russo	PD	PD–LR–SE–Mod	140,200	43.86	168,997	59.23
Paolo Damilano	None	TB–FdI–Lega–FI–UDC	124,347	38.90	116,322	40.77
Valentina Scanga	M5S	M5S–EV	28,785	9.01		
Angelo D'Orsi	PRC	PRC–PCI–PaP	8,095	2.53		
Others			18,216	5.96		
Eligible voters			689,684	100.00	689,684	100.00
Voted			331,566	48.08	290,632	42.14
Blank or invalid ballots			11,923		5,313	
Total valid votes			319,643		285,319	

== See also ==
- it:Sindaci di Torino (since 1564)
- Timeline of Turin

== Bibliography ==
=== Articles ===
- De Nardo, Tony (19 October 2021). "Sono ventuno i sindaci di Torino dal dopoguerra" [There have been twenty-one mayors of Turin since the post-war period]. CittAgorà (in Italian). Archived from the original on 18 December 2025.
- Farina, Gabriele (19 June 2024). "Tutti i sindaci di Torino, dai decurioni ai sindaci eletti dai cittadini" [All the mayors of Turin, from the decurions to the mayors elected by the citizens]. Quotidiano Piemontese (in Italian). Archived from the original on 20 June 2024.
- "Michela Favaro, vicesindaco con delega a Personale, Patrimonio, Legalità e Appalti" [Michela Favaro, deputy mayor with responsibility for Personnel, Property, Legality, and Procurement]. Torino Magazine (in Italian). No. Winter 2021. 17 December 2021. Archived from the original on 7 September 2024.
- Pizzigallo, Claudi (2 May 2016). "Torino: i sindaci da record e le 'sindachesse', dal 1564 a oggi" [Turin: record-breaking mayors and female mayors, from 1564 to today]. TorinoToday (in Italian). Archived from the original on 25 May 2024.
- Raniero, Flavio (8 January 2025). "I sindaci di Torino dal 1800 al 1850" [The mayors of Turin from 1800 to 1850] (in Italian). Associazione Amici della Fondazione Cavour. Archived from the original on 20 December 2025.
- Raniero, Flavio (5 November 2025). "I sindaci di Torino dal 1851 al 1900" [The mayors of Turin from 1851 to 1900] (in Italian). Associazione Amici della Fondazione Cavour. Archived from the original on 20 December 2025.
- Scammell, Rosie (20 June 2016). "Anti-establishment candidates elected to lead Rome and Turin". The Guardian. Archived from the original on 9 October 2025.
- "Sindaci, podestà, commissari: tutta la serie" [Mayors, podestàs, commissioners: the whole series]. Torino Storia (in Italian). 20 June 2016. Archived from the original on 14 July 2024.
- "Storico Elezioni Comunali di Torino (TO)" [History of the Turin Municipal Elections (TO)]. Tuttitalia.it (in Italian). 2024. Archived from the original on 16 February 2025.
- "Torino". Treccani (in Italian). 28 July 2023.
- "Votiamo il sindaco dal 1848: il primo fu Francesco Luigi de Margherita" [We vote for the mayor since 1848: the first was Francesco Luigi de Margherita]. Torino Storia (in Italian). 8 May 2016. Archived from the original on 21 June 2024.

=== Books ===
- Borio, Ferruccio (1980). I sindaci della libertà. Torino dal 1945 ad oggi [The Mayors of Freedom: Turin from 1945 to Today] (in Italian). Edizioni Eda – via Google Books.
- Cravero, Davide Giovanni (1964). Trecento anni di vita del Palazzo Civico di Torino. 1663–1963 [Three Hundred Years of the Life of the Turin Civic Palace: 1663–1963] (in Italian). Comune di Torino. Archived from the original on 26 September 2006.
