= Celeste Negarville =

Italian politician (1905–1959)

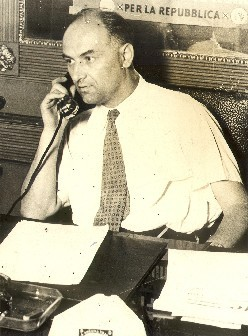

Mayor of Turin
- In office 17 December 1946 – 13 May 1948
- Preceded by: Giovanni Roveda
- Succeeded by: Domenico Coggiola

Member of the Chamber of Deputies
- In office 12 June 1958 – 18 July 1959
- Constituency: Turin

Member of the Senate of the Republic
- In office 8 May 1948 – 11 June 1958
- Constituency: Piedmont

Personal details
- Born: 17 June 1905 Avigliana, Italy
- Died: 18 July 1959 (aged 54) Rome, Italy
- Party: PCI

Celeste Negarville (17 June 1905 – 18 July 1959) was an Italian communist, journalist and politician, first director of the post-war newspaper l'Unità and undersecretary for foreign affairs in the Parri and De Gasperi governments. He was born in Avigliana.

== Early life to 1934 ==
Negarville was born in Avigliana, but his family moved to Turin in 1912, where his father found work as a worker at Fiat. He started working as a teenager as an electrician, while simultaneously following professional evening courses.

In 1919 he joined the Socialist Youth Federation and, in 1921, the newly formed Communist Party of Italy of Gramsci and Bordiga. After the 1922 Turin massacre he was arrested and then released, but summoned back to court. He absconded to Paris, where he worked at the Renault factory until his trial in Italy ended with an acquittal for lack of evidence. Returning to Italy, in 1924 he was appointed Piedmontese regional secretary of the Italian Communist Youth Federation (FGCI).

In 1927, in Bologna, he was arrested again and tried the following year before the Special Court for the Defense of the State. Sentenced to 12 years and 9 months' imprisonment, he served his sentence in Volterra, Castelfranco Emilia, Fossano and Civitavecchia. He spent the longest part of his detention in Civitavecchia, with Mauro Scoccimarro, Pietro Secchia and Umberto Terracini.

== 1934–1945 ==
Released in 1934, following an amnesty, he left again for Paris. The following year he was sent to Moscow as the Italian representative at the Communist International of Youth. He stayed in Moscow for three years; he married the Russian Nora Rosenberg and, in 1938, his only daughter Lucetta was born. In the same year he returned to Paris, where he remained during the Nazi occupation, undertaking clandestine organizational tasks for the party. He returned home on foot across the Maritime Alps in January 1943. Having settled in Milan, he was one of the main organizers of the strikes at the end of March 1943.

After the fall of Mussolini on 25 July 1943, he was one of the drafters of the extraordinary edition of l'Unità released in Milan the following day. After 8 September he moved to Rome, where he was among the first members of the central leadership of the PCI. In May 1944 he was appointed as a member of the junta of the National Liberation Committee, replacing Giorgio Amendola. After the liberation of Rome he was the first director of the newspaper l'Unità, printed officially after years of clandestine distribution.

He was among the screenwriters of the film Rome Open City (1945), together with Sergio Amidei, Federico Fellini and Roberto Rossellini.

== Political career ==
Deputy to the Constituent Assembly, he was also undersecretary for foreign affairs in the Parri government and in the first De Gasperi government . In August 1945, as Undersecretary for Foreign Affairs, he confided to the Soviet ambassador that his party considered "Italian demands on Trieste" unacceptable and that "the Communists would not have tolerated such behavior by the Italian delegation at the Peace Conference".

Subsequently, from 17 December 1946 to May 1948, he was mayor of Turin, the first democratically elected in republican Italy. In 1948 he became a member by right of the new Senate, under the 3rd final provision of the Constitution, by virtue of having been imprisoned for more than 5 years by the Special Fascist Tribunal for the Defense of the State. He kept his seat after the 1953 election, and was then elected deputy in 1958.

A member of the leadership of the PCI, he was Secretary of the party’s Turin federation in the years when the automation of the plants was changing the internal organization of the factories and, above all, of Fiat. He ably faced the attack led by Vittorio Valletta, that sought to use these changes to dismantle the workers' post-war gains. The defeat of the CGIL in the elections for the Internal Commissions of Fiat prompted changes in the governing bodies of the party. Negarville left Turin and assumed the Italian leadership of the Peace Movement, a role that also led him to take on important international initiatives.

== Later years ==
Indro Montanelli reports that in 1956 Negarville was sent by the party to Moscow together with Gian Carlo Pajetta. Here, like Pajetta, he was shocked by Nikita Khrushchev's account of how Beria would be physically eliminated by the new Soviet leadership.

Again according to Montanelli, Negarville later wanted to follow the example of Eugenio Reale, who left the party, but refrained from doing so solely because his wife's family was in Russia and therefore feared for her. However, Montanelli's claim finds has confirmation neither from his family members (among them Adalberto Minucci, his son-in-law), nor from his friends.

He died in Rome in 1959 due to liver problems.

The Municipality of Turin named a street after him on the outskirts of the city, in the Mirafiori Sud district.
