= Daniele Saia =

Italian politician (born 1973)

President of the Province of Isernia
- Incumbent
- Assumed office 19 November 2023
- Preceded by: Alfredo Ricci

Mayor of Agnone
- Incumbent
- Assumed office 23 September 2020
- Preceded by: Lorenzo Marcovecchio

Personal details
- Born: 2 November 1973 (age 52) Agnone, Molise, Italy
- Party: Italian Socialist Party

Daniele Saia (born 2 November 1973) is an Italian politician serving as president of the Province of Isernia since 2023. He has also served as mayor of Agnone since 2020.

In November 2023, Saia was elected president of the Province of Isernia as the candidate for the centre-left coalition, winning against incumbent Alfredo Ricci, the centre-right candidate, with 497,65 weighted votes (53%).
