= Carlo Pinchia =

Mayor of Turin

Mayor of Turin
- In office 1849–1850
- Preceded by: Luigi de Margherita
- Succeeded by: Giorgia Bellono

Carlo Pinchia (1802 – 1875) was an Italian magistrate and the mayor of Turin from 1849 to 1850.

== Biography ==
He was the second elected mayor of Turin, after Luigi de Margherita . During his mandate, on 6 July 1849, the administration of Turin provisionally adopted a "Regulation for internal administration" which remained in force until 1863.

In his short administration, he dealt with issues such as children's education, public hygiene, the reorganisation of the municipal police proportionate to the size of the city, as well as emergencies such as the threat of cholera and the reception of the body of King Charles Albert.

After the Rattazzi decree of 1859 which reorganised the administration of the Kingdom of Sardinia, he was re-elected municipal councillor in the administrative elections of January 1860.

His city named a street after him in the Mirafiori Nord district.
