= Diego Novelli =

Italian politician (born 1931)

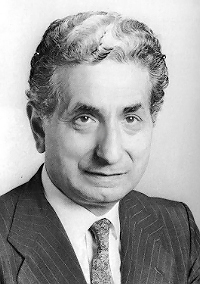
- Novelli in 1987

Mayor of Turin
- In office 14 July 1975 – 25 January 1985
- Preceded by: Giovanni Picco
- Succeeded by: Giorgio Cardetti

Member of the Chamber of Deputies
- In office 2 July 1987 – 29 May 2001

Member of the European Parliament
- In office 17 June 1984 – 2 July 1987

Personal details
- Born: 22 May 1931 (age 95) Turin, Kingdom of Italy
- Party: PCI (until 1991); LR (1991–1999)
- Profession: Journalist

Diego Novelli (born 22 May 1931) is an Italian politician. He was mayor of Turin from 1975 to 1985.

== Political career ==
A member of the city council of Turin since 1960, Novelli was elected Mayor of Turin in 1975 with the support of the Italian Communist Party (PCI) and the Italian Socialist Party (PSI), and remained in office for 10 years, during the difficult Years of Lead. Novelli was a member of the European Parliament from 1984 to 1987, when he was elected to the Chamber of Deputies. He remained a member until 2001. With the svolta della Bolognina and the end of the PCI, he co-founded with Leoluca Orlando the left-wing party The Network (LR) and tried to be re-elected mayor of Turin in 1993, supported by LR and the Communist Refoundation Party. Although he was ahead on the first round, he was defeated on the second ballot by the centre-left candidate Valentino Castellani. In 2009, Novelli stood in the 2009 European Parliament election in Italy with Left Ecology and Freedom but failed to be elected. In 2011, he was elected president of the provincial committee of ANPI.

Political offices
Preceded by Giovanni Picco	Mayor of Turin; 1975–1985	Succeeded by Giorgio Cardetti
