= Cesare Cristiani di Ravarano =

Italian politician

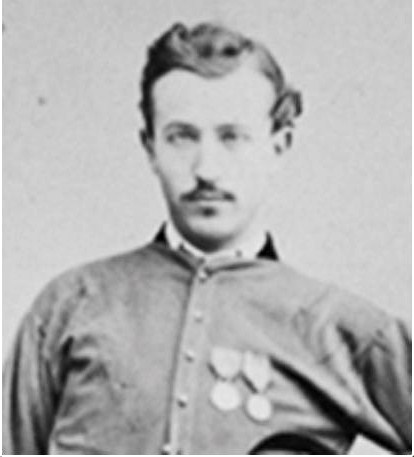

Minister of grace and justice and ecclesiastical affairs of the Kingdom of Sardinia.
- In office 27 March 1849 – 29 March 1849
- Monarch: Victor Emmanuel II
- Prime Minister: Claudio Gabriele de Launay
- Preceded by: Riccardo Sineo
- Succeeded by: Luigi de Margherita

Senator for the Kingdom of Sardegna
- In office 31 July 1849 – 21 March 1857

Personal details
- Born: 18 July 1797 Solero
- Died: 21 March 1857 (aged 59) Turin
- Education: University of Paris
- Profession: Magister

Cesare Cristiani di Ravarano (also spelled Di Raverano) (Solero, 18 July 1797 – Turin, 21 March 1857) was an Italian Politician and magistrate.

== Biography ==
He graduated in law from the University of Paris, degree confirmed at the University of Turin became Attorney General at the Royal Chamber of Accounts of Piedmont in 1841, Class President in the Senate of Piedmont on December 11, 1847, the following year First President of the Senate of Casale. He was also a Member of the Higher Commission of Liquidation and of the General Council of the Administration of the Public Debt in the Mainland States.
