= List of presidents of the Province of Isernia =

President of the Province of Isernia
- Presidente della Provincia di Isernia
- Incumbent; Daniele Saia since 19 November 2023
- Term length: 4 years
- Inaugural holder: Giuseppe Vitagliano
- Formation: 1970

The president of the Province of Isernia is the head of the provincial government in Isernia, Molise, Italy. The president oversees the administration of the province, coordinates the activities of the municipalities, and represents the province in regional and national matters.

Since November 2023, the office has been held by Daniele Saia of the Italian Socialist Party.

== List ==
No.	Portrait	Name	Term of office		Party
No.	Portrait	Name	Start	End	Party
1		Giuseppe Vitagliano	30 July 1970	10 September 1975	Christian Democracy
2		Giovanni Memmi	10 September 1975	28 June 1977	Christian Democracy
3		Angelo Jovine	28 June 1977	13 March 1979	Christian Democracy
4		Ettore Rufo	13 March 1979	21 October 1980	Italian Democratic Socialist Party
5		Giuseppe Caranci	21 October 1980	21 June 1982	Christian Democracy
(2)		Giovanni Memmi	21 June 1982	12 September 1985	Christian Democracy
(5)		Giuseppe Caranci	12 September 1985	20 July 1990	Christian Democracy
6		Attilio Peluso	20 July 1990	8 May 1995	Italian Socialist Party
7		Domenico Pellegrino	8 May 1995	28 June 1999	Democratic Party of the Left
8		Raffaele Mauro	28 June 1999	28 June 2004	National Alliance
8		Raffaele Mauro	28 June 2004	10 June 2009	National Alliance
9		Luigi Mazzuto	10 June 2009	15 October 2014	The People of Freedom
10		Luigi Brasiello	15 October 2014	27 November 2015	Democratic Party
11		Lorenzo Coia	27 November 2015	27 May 2019	Democratic Party
–		Roberto Di Pasquale (acting)	27 May 2019	25 August 2019	Democratic Party
12		Alfredo Ricci	25 August 2019	19 November 2023	Forza Italia
13		Daniele Saia	19 November 2023	Incumbent	Italian Socialist Party

== Sources ==
- "Storia amministrativa dell'ente". Ministero dell'Interno.
- "I Presidenti della Provincia". Provincia di Isernia.
