= Luigi Mazzuto =

Italian politician

Regional assessor for Labour and Social policies of Molise
- In office 22 May 2018 – 16 April 2020
- President: Donato Toma

President of the Province of Isernia
- In office 10 June 2009 – 15 October 2014
- Preceded by: Raffaele Mauro
- Succeeded by: Luigi Brasiello

Personal details
- Born: 19 July 1954 (age 72) Roccamandolfi, Italy
- Party: Forza Italia, The People of Freedom
- Education: University of Cassino and Southern Lazio
- Occupation: Civil servant

Luigi Mazzuto (born 19 July 1954) is an Italian politician who served as regional assessor of Molise and president of the Province of Isernia from 2009 to 2014.

== Life and career ==
Mazzuto was born in Roccamandolfi in 1954. He graduated in pedagogy from the University of Cassino and Southern Lazio and worked for the RAI production centre in Rome before being transferred to the Campobasso office in 1979.

He began his political career as a municipal councillor in Roccamandolfi in 1990 for Christian Democracy. He later joined Forza Italia, serving as provincial party secretary from 2004 to 2007. He also served as a councillor in Isernia between 1997 and 1998.

In June 2009, Mazzuto was elected president of the Province of Isernia in the first round of voting with 65% of the vote. He held the office until 2014.

He later served as regional assessor for Molise from May 2018 to April 2020.
