= Luigi Brasiello =

Italian politician

President of the Province of Isernia
- In office 15 October 2014 – 13 October 2015
- Preceded by: Luigi Mazzuto
- Succeeded by: Lorenzo Coia

Mayor of Isernia
- In office 29 May 2013 – 17 September 2015
- Preceded by: Ugo De Vivo
- Succeeded by: Giacomo D'Apollonio

Personal details
- Born: 5 August 1960 (age 65) Isernia, Molise, Italy
- Party: Democratic Party
- Occupation: entrepreneur

Luigi Brasiello (born 5 August 1960) is an Italian politician.

== Career ==
Brasiello ran for mayor of Isernia at the 2013 Italian local elections, leading a centre-left coalition formed by Democratic Party, UDEUR, Union of the Centre, Left Ecology Freedom and Italian Socialist Party. He was elected with the 50,5% and took office on 29 May 2013.

He served as president of the Province of Isernia from October 2014 to October 2015.

== See also ==
- 2013 Italian local elections
- List of mayors of Isernia

Political offices
Preceded by Luigi Mazzuto	President of the Province of Isernia; 2014–2015	Succeeded by Lorenzo Coia
Preceded by Ugo De Vivo	Mayor of Isernia; 2013–2015	Succeeded by Giacomo D'Apollonio
