= Luigi de Margherita =

Italian politician

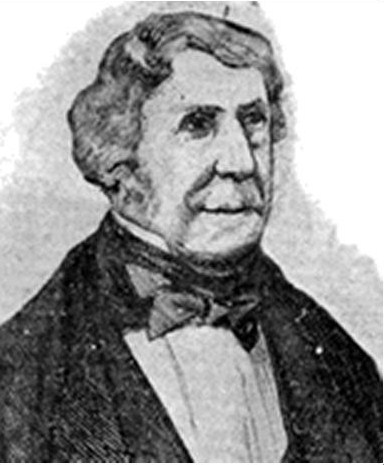

Minister of grace and justice and ecclesiastical affairs of the Kingdom of Sardinia.
- In office 30 March 1849 – 20 December 1849
- Monarch: Victor Emmanuel II
- Prime Minister: Claudio Gabriele de Launay
- Preceded by: Cesare Cristiani di Ravarano
- Succeeded by: Giuseppe Siccardi

Senator for the Kingdom of Sardegna
- In office 22 December 1849 – 20 May 1856

Personal details
- Born: 9 October 1783 Turin
- Died: 20 May 1856 (aged 72) Turin
- Education: University of Turin
- Profession: Lawyer

Francesco Maria Luigi de Margherita (Demargherita) (Turin, October 9, 1783 – Turin, May 20, 1856) was an Italian lawyer, politician and jurist who worked to reform the institutions of the Kingdom of Sardinia.

== Biography ==
He was born in Turin in 1783 to Giovanni Francesco de Margherita and Benedetta De Caroli. Orphaned as a child, he was raised by his paternal uncle Andrea, an artillery colonel in the Sardinian army.

De Margherita graduated in law in 1802 from the University of Turin, he immediately devoted himself to teaching. Regent of the chair of Canonical Institutions in 1817, in 1819 he became its holder, along with that of Civil Institutions; from 1822 he was also professor of Civil Law.

De Margherita was appointed Baron by King Charles Albert on July 18, 1844, he became a senator of the Kingdom of Sardinia on December 19, 1848; after just twelve days he became the first mayor of Turin elected by the people. He was sworn in on January 1, 1849, and announced as the main lines of his program elementary education extended to females, relief for the "less affluent classes," "urban police," and hygiene "of the inhabited area". After only three months he was called to hold the Ministry of Grace, Justice and Cults in the Government de Launay and had to give up the mayor's chair to Carlo Pinchia. In the meantime he had also become councilor of the Magistrate of Cassation (later the Court of Cassation) in Turin in 1848 and class president of the Court of Cassation in 1849. But his most important legacy as guardasigilli is the bill he commissioned Siccardi with the aim of fostering the autonomy of the judiciary from the executive power. This bill was initially rejected, but came into effect on May 19, 1851, when De Margherita had not been a minister for some time.

As minister of justice, he attempted to initiate reforms that would bring the organization of the Kingdom of Sardinia in line with the principles of the Statuto albertino (e.g., the abolition of primogeniture rights), but he had to withdraw them due to opposition from the more conservative wing of the Subalpine Parliament. He entrusted his advisor Giuseppe Siccardi with the task of settling a dispute with the Pope over the dioceses of Turin and Asti, but this mission also ended in failure.

His political career came to an abrupt halt following a scandal. He had granted the legitimization of a natural daughter of the late Marquis Giovanni Battista Serra, who then became engaged to his son. Suspicion that he had acted out of self-interest, since legitimation involved a substantial inheritance, forced him to resign on December 18, 1849. He did not retire from public life, however, remaining an adviser to the royal family and speaker of numerous bills, including those for reforming the ecclesiastical forum and establishing civil marriage.

He died on 20 May 1856
