= Giacomo D'Apollonio =

Italian politician

Mayor of Isernia
- In office 24 June 2016 – 19 October 2021
- Preceded by: Luigi Brasiello
- Succeeded by: Piero Castrataro

Personal details
- Born: 25 April 1951 (age 75) Isernia, Molise, Italy
- Party: Brothers of Italy
- Profession: law enforcer

Giacomo D'Apollonio (born 25 April 1951 in Isernia) is an Italian politician.

He is a member of the right-wing party Brothers of Italy. He was elected Mayor of Isernia on 19 June 2016 and took office on 24 June, holding the office until 19 October 2021.

He is brigadier general on leave of the Guardia di Finanza.

== Biography ==
He ran for mayor of his city for the first time as a candidate for the center-right coalition in 2013, receiving 42.95% of the vote in the first round but losing to Luigi Brasiello of the center-left (50.54%). He ran a second time—this time as the leader of a right-wing coalition aligned with Brothers of Italy and former Molise President Michele Iorio—in the 2016 local elections. During the campaign, he placed heavy emphasis on the issues of public safety and the fight against organized crime. In the first round on June 5, he received 25.14% of the vote, compared to 19.13% for his main center-right challenger, Gabriele Melogli, who had previously served as mayor from 2002 to 2012. In the runoff on June 19, he was elected with 59.00% of the vote, compared to 41.00% for Melogli. In 2021, after losing the support of the former governor, he decided not to run for a second term.

== See also ==
- 2016 Italian local elections
- List of mayors of Isernia

Political offices
Preceded by Luigi Brasiello	Mayor of Isernia; 2016-2021	Succeeded by Piero Castrataro
