= Chiara Appendino =

Italian politician (born 1984)

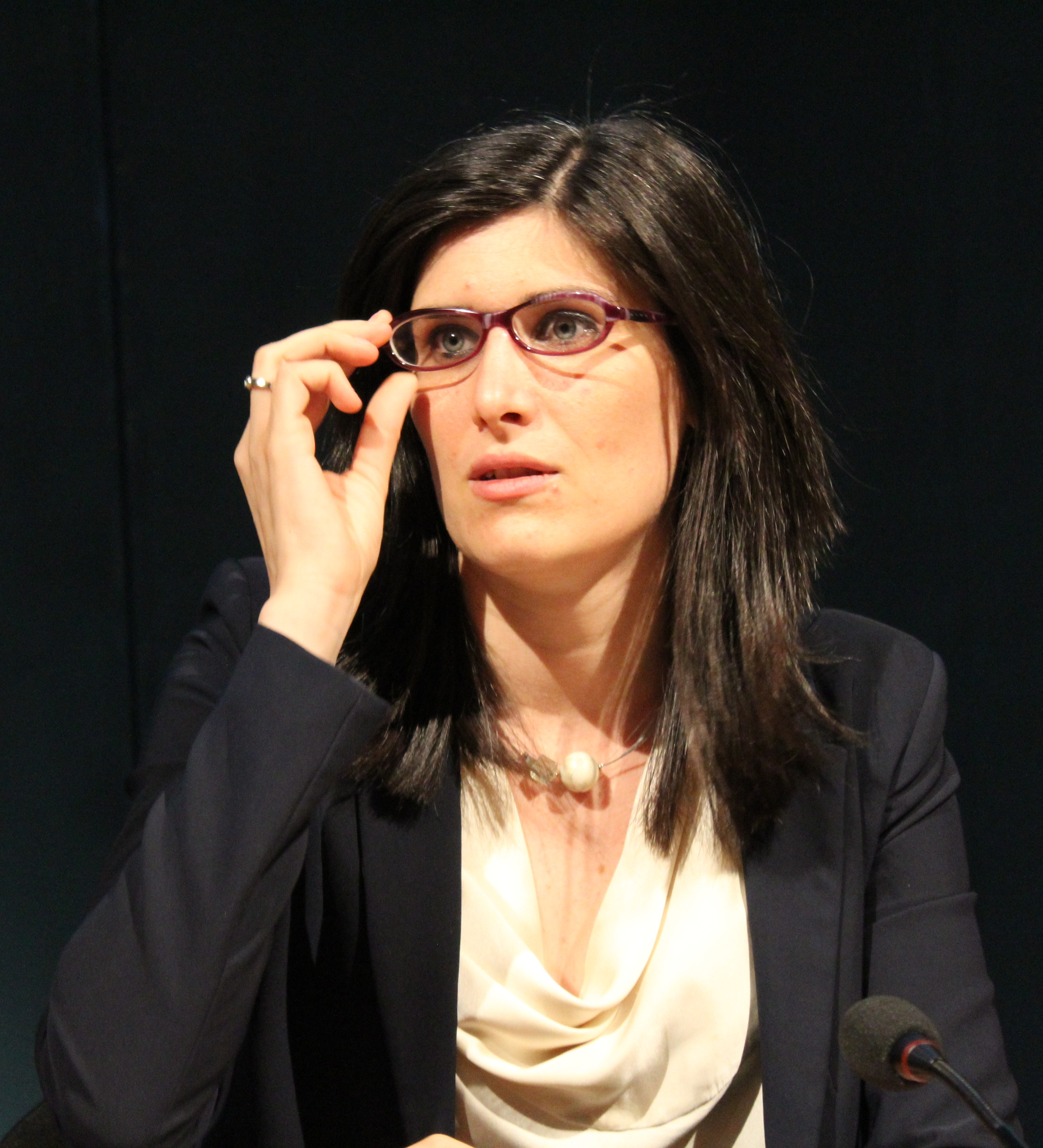

39th Mayor of Turin
- In office 30 June 2016 – 27 October 2021
- Preceded by: Piero Fassino
- Succeeded by: Stefano Lo Russo

Vice President of the Five Star Movement
- In office 11 December 2023 – 18 October 2025
- President: Giuseppe Conte
- Preceded by: Alessandra Todde

Member of the Chamber of Deputies
- Incumbent
- Assumed office 13 October 2022
- Constituency: Piedmont 2

Personal details
- Born: 12 June 1984 (age 42) Moncalieri, Italy
- Party: Five Star Movement
- Spouse: Marco Lavatelli (m. 2010)
- Children: 2
- Education: Bocconi University
- Profession: Sports manager

Chiara Appendino (born 12 June 1984) is an Italian politician and sports manager, mayor of Turin and the Turin metropolitan city from 30 June 2016 to 27 October 2021 and vice president of the Italian Tennis Federation from 2 October 2020. She is a member of the Five Star Movement (M5S).

== Biography ==
Appendino was born in Moncalieri on 12 June 1984. She attended the liceo classico Vincenzo Gioberti in Turin and graduated from Bocconi University in Milan with a degree in International Economics and Management, majoring in economics and finance.

From September 2007 to January 2010, she worked as a controllore di gestione for the Juventus football team; starting on 1 January 2010, she has been financial administrator in her husband's business.

== Political career ==
Appendino's first political involvement was in the Left Ecology Freedom party. In 2012, she joined the nascent M5S. In the 2011 Turin local elections, Appendino was elected municipal councilor for the M5S, collecting 623 preferences.

On 8 November 2015, Appendino officially announced her candidacy for mayor of Turin in the 2016 Italian local elections. In the first round she received 30.92% of the vote at the ballot. On 19 June 2016, she was officially elected Mayor of Turin, picking up 54.56% of the vote in the second round, defeating incumbent mayor Piero Fassino, who received 45.44% of votes.

She did not run for the 2021 Italian local elections and was replaced as mayor by Stefano Lo Russo of the Democratic Party.

=== Legal proceedings ===
In October 2017, the Prosecutor's Office of Turin started an investigation on Appendino for falsity in a public document in connection with the city's 2016 budget. She was first convicted on 21 September 2020 and handed a six-month suspended sentence. On 16 May 2022, the Turin Court of Appeal acquitted her because the facts of the case did not constitute a crime.

In November 2017, an investigation started into lack of safety during incidents at Piazza San Carlo, where one person died and more than 1,500 were injured in the 2017 Turin stampede during the UEFA Champions League final match between Juventus and Real Madrid on 5 June. One of the injured people became tetraplegic and eventually died on 25 January 2019. On 27 January 2021, she was sentenced in first instance to 18 months jail for her responsibilities during the stampede in Piazza San Carlo. She appealed.

In June 2019, a third investigation was started based on peculation. The case was dismissed in 2020.

In February 2021, another investigation started against her, Piero Fassino, Sergio Chiamparino, Alberto Cirio, and others. They must respond for not having taken sufficient measures to combat smog pollution that since 2015 has led the Turin air to be repeatedly the worst in Italy.

== Personal life ==
Appendino has been married since 2010 to the Turinese entrepreneur Marco Lavatelli, with whom she has one daughter, Sara, born on 19 January 2016 at the Mauritian Hospital of Turin, and one son, Andrea, born on 29 October 2021 at the Sant'Anna Hospital in Turin.

Political offices
Preceded by Piero Fassino	Mayor of Turin; 2016–2021	Succeeded by Stefano Lo Russo
