= Sergio Chiamparino =

Italian politician (born 1948)

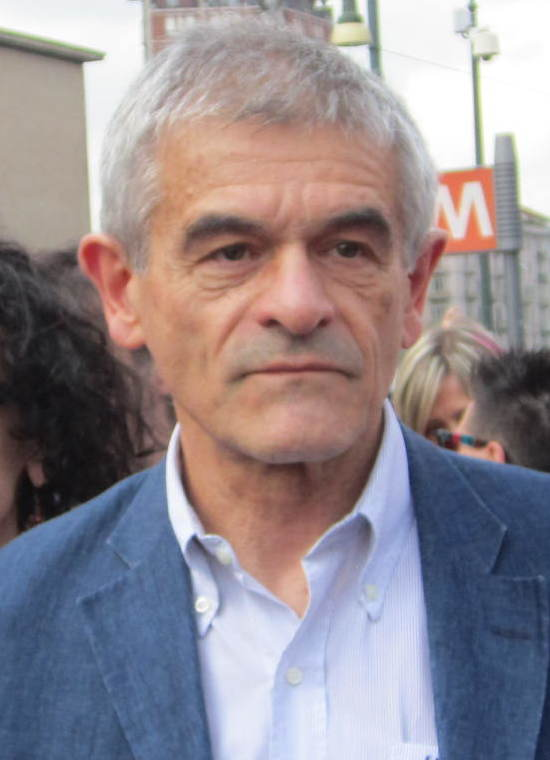
- Chiamparino in 2014

President of the Conference of Regions and Autonomous Provinces
- In office 31 July 2014 – 17 December 2015
- Preceded by: Vasco Errani
- Succeeded by: Stefano Bonaccini

President of Piedmont
- In office 9 June 2014 – 6 June 2019
- Preceded by: Roberto Cota
- Succeeded by: Alberto Cirio

Mayor of Turin
- In office 28 May 2001 – 16 May 2011
- Preceded by: Valentino Castellani
- Succeeded by: Piero Fassino

Member of the Chamber of Deputies
- In office 9 May 1996 – 29 May 2001
- Constituency: Piedmont 1 – Turin 4

Personal details
- Born: 1 September 1948 (age 78) Moncalieri, Italy
- Party: PCI (before 1991); PDS (1991–1998); DS (1998–2007); PD (since 2007)
- Education: University of Turin

Sergio Chiamparino (born 1 September 1948) is an Italian politician. He was mayor of Turin from 2001 to 2011, and president of Piedmont from 2014 to 2019. He is also the author of several books, including Semplicemente sindaco (2006, with Maurizio Crosetti), La sfida. Oltre il Pd per tornare a vincere. Anche al Nord (2010), Cordata con sindaco (2011, with Valter Giuliano), and TAV. Perché sì (2018, with Piero Fassino).

== Early life and career ==
Born in Moncalieri, Piedmont, into a working-class family, Chiamparino obtained a diploma in ragioneria and then graduated in political science at the University of Turin, where he worked as a researcher until 1975. That same year, he started his political career in his native city as head of the Italian Communist Party in the town council of Moncalieri. In 1974, he served in the artillery regiment of the Alpini. From 1975 to 1980, he was coordinator of the Economic Planning of the Piedmont Region. From 1985 to 1987, he was an official in the European Parliament. Returning to Italy, from 1989 to 1991, he was regional secretary of the trade union CGIL. He joined the Democratic Party of the Left on its formation and was its provincial secretary from 1991 to 1995.

In 1993, Chiamparino was elected as city councillor of Turin. With 51.3% of the votes in Turin's fourth single-member district, he was elected to the country's Chamber of Deputies in the 1996 Italian general election, following an upset in the left-leaning district of Mirafiori (Turin's seventh single-member district) in the 1994 Italian general election to the centre-right coalition candidate Alessandro Meluzzi, a former Freemason who later became a primate of the Orthodox Church in Italy. With less than half a percentage deficit from Meluzzi at about 31% of the popular vote, Chiamparino had lost in 1994 by less than 400 votes.

== Mayor of Turin ==
In May 2001, Chiamparino was elected mayor of Turin as a member of the Democrats of the Left, succeeding to Valentino Castellani; he oversaw the organization for the 2006 Winter Olympics in Turin, and the city's transition into a post-industrial society. His strategic vision focused on economic development and social cohesion. This included the conversion of Turin's traditional manufacturing and automobile industry with the technical-scientific business sector, as well as the renewal of its industrial areas, and making Turin a centre for industrial innovation and the information and communication businesses. He saw the Olympics as a way for the city to invest in major logistic and infrastructures, increase cultural and tourist initiatives, and promote Turin on the worldwide stage.

As mayor of Turin, Chiamparino supported European integration and the completion of the Turin–Lyon high-speed railway, and said that the city must be a human and safe community, where minorities and vulnerable people are part of its civic society, to ensure its long-term success. He developed several projects to improve the city's quality of life, including housing, education, and the elderly, as well as the integration of first and second-generation non-European Union immigrants, and training-linked employment prospects. Chiamparino enacted a series of measures to combat crime and increase safety. He saw the protection of the environment as inevitable linked to the promotion of public health, and linked a higher environmental quality to bigger economic growth and investment.

In May 2006, Chiamparino was re-elected the mayor of Turin with 66.6% of votes, defeating the centre-right coalition candidate Rocco Buttiglione. During his mayoralty rule, he was among the country's most popular and appreciated mayors. From 2009 to 2011, he was also president of the National Association of Italian Municipalities. In May 2012, he was elected chairman of Fondazione San Paolo.

During the first three ballots of the 2013 Italian presidential election held on 18–19 April, before Giorgio Napolitano reluctantly agreed on 20 April to seek an unprecedented second term as the president of Italy, Chiamparino received 41, 90, and 4 votes, respectively. The Renziani wing of the Democratic Party (PD), the party Chiamparino belonged to, identified him as their flag candidate as opposed to the official candidate Franco Marini, the former Italian minister and president of the Senate of the Republic, who was also supported by The People of Freedom, Civic Choice, and later on by Brothers of Italy. After the first ballot, he emerged as the third most voted candidate after Marini (521 votes), whose candidacy collapsed, and Stefano Rodotà (240 votes), the Five Star Movement (M5S) candidate.

== President of Piedmont ==
In February 2014, Chiamparino resigned from his position at Fondazione San Paolo to pursue a presidential run for the Piedmont region. In the 2014 Piedmontese regional election held on 25 May, in a landslide win with 47.1% of the votes over the 22.1% of the votes by the second-placed candidate Gilberto Pichetto Fratin of the centre-right coalition, he was elected president of the Regional Council of Piedmont. On 31 July 2014, he was unanimously elected president of the Conference of Regions and Autonomous Provinces by winning the challenges of Enrico Rossi, the then president of Tuscany, and Claudio Burlando, the then president of Liguria; all three were supported by part of the PD, and Chiamparino replaced Vasco Errani, also a member of the PD and the outgoing president of Emilia-Romagna. Stefano Caldoro, the president of Campania for the centre-right coalition, was designated as the vice president. On 22 October 2015, he resigned from his position due to the judgement given by the country's Court of the Audit on the budget of the Piedmont region; his resignation was frozen at the request of his fellow presidents. In December 2015, he was succeeded by fellow party member Stefano Bonaccini.

For the 2019 Piedmontese regional election, Chiamparino initially stated in June 2018 that he would not run for a second term. In September 2018, he declared his intention to run for re-election in the next regional election. Before Chiara Appendino, the mayor of Turin for the M5S, decided to withdraw from the bidding process, he supported the joint candidacy of Turin, Milan, and Cortina d'Ampezzo for the 2026 Winter Olympics. As a supporter of the Turin–Lyon high-speed railway, he criticized the first Conte government for its opposition, led mainly by the M5S. In March 2019, he called for a referendum about the Turin–Lyon high-speed railway, to be held on the same day as the regional election, and asked to the then Italian Minister of the Interior, Matteo Salvini, to allow it; both Giuseppe Conte, the then Prime Minister of Italy, and Salvini rejected the idea. In the election held on 26 May, Chiamparino lost 49.9%–35.8% to the centre-right coalition candidate Alberto Cirio, and acknowledged the defeat. Despite the loss, he managed to get elected to the Regional Council of Piedmont.

== Personal life ==
Chiamparino is married to Anna, and has a son, Tommaso. He is a well-known supporter of Torino FC, which he helped to save from going bankrupt in 2005–2006.

== Works ==
Chiamparino has written various books, some in the form of interviews, on his political-administrative experience. They include the chapter Le ristrutturazioni industriali in Problemi del movimento sindacale in Italia 1943-1973, published by Feltrinelli in 1976; Municipio. Dialogo su Torino e il governo locale con Giuseppe Berta e Bruno Manghi, published by Marsilio in 2002; La città che parla: i torinesi e il loro sindaco, published by Mondadori in 2003; Semplicemente sindaco, written with journalist Maurizio Crosetti and published by Cairo Publishing in 2006, La sfida. Oltre il Pd per tornare a vincere. Anche al Nord, published by Einaudi in 2010; Cordata con sindaco, written with Valter Giuliano about Chiamparino's passion for the mountains and mountaineering, and published by CDA & VIVALDA in 2011; and Tav. Perchè sì, written with fellow politician Piero Fassino about the Turin–Lyon high-speed railway (TAV) and published by Baldini & Castoldi in 2018.

== Electoral history ==
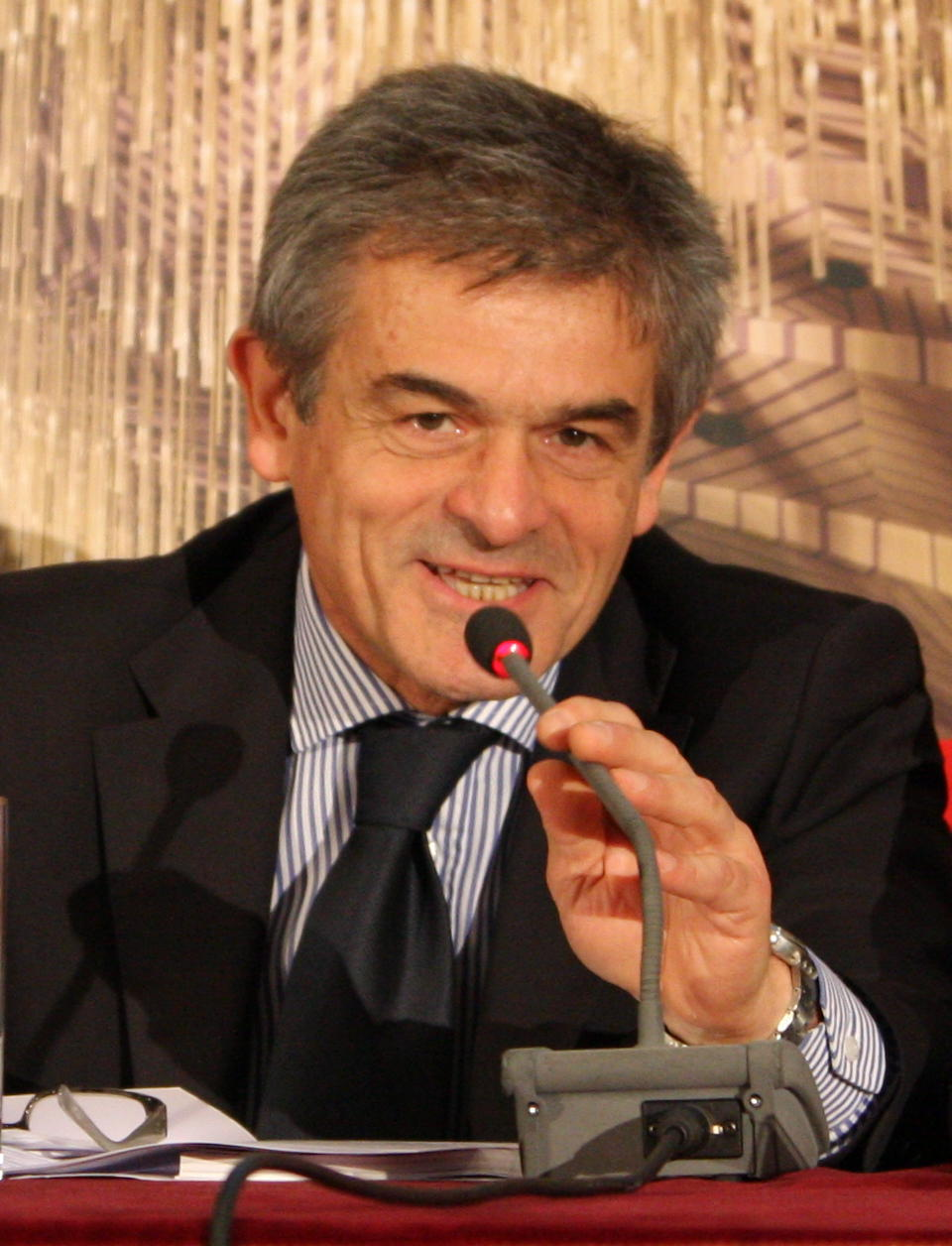
Chiamparino in 2008

| Election | House | Constituency | Party | Votes | Result |
|---|---|---|---|---|---|
| 1994 | Chamber of Deputies | Turin 7 | PDS | 31,290 | Not elected |
| 1996 | Chamber of Deputies | Turin 4 | PDS | 39,418 | Elected |

=== First-past-the-post elections ===
1994 general election (C): Piedmont 1 – Turin 7
| Candidate | Coalition | Votes | % |
|---|---|---|---|
| Alessandro Meluzzi | Pole of Good Government | 31,687 | 35.59 |
| Sergio Chiamparino | Alliance of Progressives | 31,290 | 35.15 |
| Giulio Cesare Rattazzi | Pact for Italy | 11,153 | 12.53 |
| Bernardo Chiappo | National Alliance | 9,330 | 10.48 |
| Maurizio Lupi | Greens Greens | 5,566 | 6.25 |
| Total | | 89,026 | 100.00 |

1996 general election (C): Piedmont 1 – Turin 4
| Candidate | Coalition | Votes | % |
|---|---|---|---|
| Sergio Chiamparino | The Olive Tree | 39,418 | 51.39 |
| Luciano Pianelli | Pole for Freedoms | 25,863 | 33.72 |
| Mario Borghezio | Northern League | 8,337 | 10.87 |
| Others | | 3,080 | 4.02 |
| Total | | 76,698 | 100.00 |

== Honours ==
- Grand Official Order of Merit of the Italian Republic, 2 June 2007.

Political offices
| Preceded by Valentino Castellani | Mayor of Turin; 2001–2011 | Succeeded by Piero Fassino |
| Preceded by Roberto Cota | President of Piedmont; 2014–2019 | Succeeded by Alberto Cirio |
