= Piero Fassino =

Italian politician (born 1949)

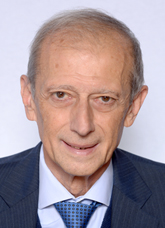
- Fassino in 2022

Mayor of Turin
- In office 16 May 2011 – 20 June 2016
- Preceded by: Sergio Chiamparino
- Succeeded by: Chiara Appendino

Minister of Justice
- In office 26 April 2000 – 11 June 2001
- Prime Minister: Giuliano Amato
- Preceded by: Oliviero Diliberto
- Succeeded by: Roberto Castelli

Minister of Foreign Trade
- In office 21 October 1998 – 26 April 2000
- Prime Minister: Massimo D'Alema
- Preceded by: Augusto Fantozzi
- Succeeded by: Enrico Letta

Secretary of the Democrats of the Left
- In office 18 November 2001 – 14 October 2007
- Preceded by: Walter Veltroni
- Succeeded by: Office abolished

Member of the Chamber of Deputies
- Incumbent
- Assumed office 23 March 2018
- Constituency: Emilia-Romagna (2018–2022); Veneto (since 2022)
- In office 15 April 1994 – 19 July 2011
- Constituency: Liguria (1994–1996); Venaria Reale (1996–2006); Piedmont (2006–2011)

Personal details
- Born: 7 October 1949 (age 76) Avigliana, Italy
- Party: PCI (1968–1991); PDS (1991–1998); DS (1998–2007); PD (since 2007)
- Spouse: Anna Maria Serafini
- Education: University of Turin

Piero Franco Rodolfo Fassino (born 7 October 1949) is an Italian politician. He was Mayor of Turin from 2011 until 2016.

== Early life and education ==
Fassino was born in Avigliana, Piedmont (province of Turin), in a traditional socialist family. His father Eugenio was a partisan, commander of the 41st Garibaldi Brigade, and his paternal grandfather Piero was beaten to death by the Italian Fascists in 1944 because he did not want to reveal his son's hideout, while his maternal grandfather Cesare Grisa was one of the founders of the Italian Socialist Party. He graduated in Political Science.

== Political career ==
=== Early career ===
Fassino registered with the Italian Communist Youth Federation of Turin in 1968. In 1975, he was elected a Member of the City Council of the Piedmont regional capital, a position he held for ten years. From 1985 to 1990, he was Provincial Councillor, also in Turin. He was also secretary of the provincial Italian Communist Party (PCI) federation of Turin from 1983 to 1987, when he was elected as a member of the National Secretary's Office of the party, first as the Secretary's Office Coordinator, then as Responsible of Organization, during the period where the party was transformed from the PCI into the Democratic Party of the Left (PDS).

From 1991 to 1996, Fassino was International Secretary of the new party; in 1994, he was first elected to the Chamber of Deputies. Re-elected in 1996, he was appointed in 1998 as Minister for Foreign Commerce in the government headed by Massimo D'Alema. Between 2000 and 2001, he was Minister of Justice in the Giuliano Amato government. Candidate as vice-premier of The Olive Tree coalition in a ticket with former Rome Mayor Francesco Rutelli for the 2001 general elections in Italy won by the House of Freedoms rival coalition, he was still re-elected as a Member of Parliament.

In addition to his role in Parliament, Fassino was a member of Italian delegation to the Assembly of the Western European Union from 2006 until 2011, where he served as chairman of the Committee on Political Affairs and as rapporteur for the Western Balkans.

From 2007 until 2010, Fassino served as the European Union's special envoy for Myanmar, appointed by the Union’s High Representative for Common Foreign and Security Policy, Javier Solana.

=== Secretary of Democrats of the Left ===
In 2001, during the National Party Congress of the Democrats of the Left, Fassino was elected as secretary (a position of leader in Italian political parties). He was then re-elected in February 2005, during the party congress.

In 2003, Fassino and other high-ranking party members – including Romano Prodi, Lamberto Dini and Walter Veltroni – were accused of taking millions of pounds in backhanders when state-run Telecom Italia bought a 29% stake in Telekom Serbia in 1997. During his time in office, Fassino asserted that Il Giornale, a right-wing newspaper, published confidential wiretap transcripts shortly before the 2006 election to create the impression that he had exercised improper pressure in the attempted takeover of Banca Nazionale del Lavoro by insurer Unipol in 2005. In 2013, a court awarded 80,000 euros in damages to Fassino for the incident.

=== Mayor of Turin ===
Fassino served as Mayor of Turin from 2011 until 2016. In the 2016 elections, he was defeated by Chiara Appendino, who overturned an 11-point gap after the first round to win 55 per cent of the vote.

=== Back to the Parliament ===
Fassino has been serving as a member of the Italian delegation to the Parliamentary Assembly of the Council of Europe since 2018. As member of the Democratic Party, he is part of the Socialists, Democrats and Greens Group. In the Assembly, he serves on the Committee on the Honouring of Obligations and Commitments by Member States of the Council of Europe (since 2018); the Committee on Political Affairs and Democracy (since 2018); and the Sub-Committee on the Middle East and the Arab World (since 2019). He also serves as the Assembly's co-rapporteur on Serbia (alongside Ian Liddell-Grainger) and Libya.

== Recognition ==
Fassino received the America Award from the Italy-USA Foundation in 2010.

== Other activities ==
- European Council on Foreign Relations (ECFR), Member of the Council
- Italy-USA Foundation, Member (since 2018)

== Personal life ==
Fassino is married to Anna Maria Serafini, who was elected to the Italian Senate in 2006. He considers himself Roman Catholic.

== Electoral history ==
Election	House	Constituency	Party	Votes	Result
1994	Chamber of Deputies	Liguria	PDS	– (Note: Elected in a closed list proportional representation system.)	Elected
1996	Chamber of Deputies	Venaria Reale	PDS	35,887	Elected
2001	Chamber of Deputies	Venaria Reale	DS	42,871	Elected
2006	Chamber of Deputies	Piedmont 1	DS	–	Elected
2008	Chamber of Deputies	Piedmont 1	PD	–	Elected
2018	Chamber of Deputies	Emilia-Romagna 2	PD	–	Elected
2022	Chamber of Deputies	Veneto 1	PD	–	Elected

Political offices
Preceded by Augusto Fantozzi	Minister of Foreign Trade; 1998–2000	Succeeded by Enrico Letta
Preceded by Oliviero Diliberto	Minister of Justice; 2000–2001	Succeeded by Roberto Castelli
Preceded by Sergio Chiamparino	Mayor of Turin; 2011–2016	Succeeded by Chiara Appendino
Party political offices
Preceded by Walter Veltroni	Secretary of the Democrats of the Left; 2001–2007	Succeeded by Walter Veltroni as Secretary of the Democratic Party
