= Stefano Lo Russo =

Italian academic and politician

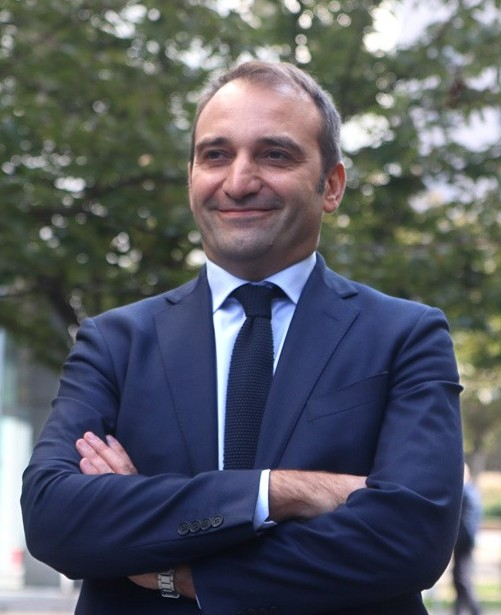

40th Mayor of Turin
- Incumbent
- Assumed office 27 October 2021
- Preceded by: Chiara Appendino

Personal details
- Born: 15 October 1975 (age 50) Turin, Italy
- Party: Democratic Party
- Education: University of Turin; Polytechnic University of Turin
- Profession: Academic, geologist

Stefano Lo Russo is an Italian politician and geologist, Mayor of Turin, Mayor of the Metropolitan City of Turin, Vice President of ANCI (National Association of Italian Municipalities) with responsibility for European and International Policies, Coordinator of Mayors for the Democratic Party, Geologist and Professor of Engineering Geology in the Department of Environment, Land, and Infrastructure Engineering at Politecnico di Torino.

== Biography ==
Born in Turin, Italy, on 15 October 1975, he graduated cum laude in Geological Sciences in 1999 and earned a Ph.D. in Environmental Engineering from Politecnico di Torino in 2004.

== Academic background ==
He served as Assistant Professor (2007–2014), Associate Professor (2014–2017), and has been a Full Professor since 2017.

He has authored numerous peer-reviewed publications, presented at international conferences.

He serves as an Associate Editor of Geofluids (Wiley) and is on the Editorial Board of Environmental Earth Sciences (Springer).

As a co-founder and board member of the Energy Security and Transition Lab (EST) at the Energy Center of Politecnico di Torino, he is also a member of the International Association of Hydrogeologists (IAH), the European Geosciences Union (EGU), and the Italian Association of Applied Geology (AIGA).

His research focuses on low-enthalpy geothermal systems, groundwater planning and protection, rockfall risk analysis, energy security, and mining sustainability.

He teaches Engineering Geology, Hydrogeology, Petroleum and Mining Geology, Geothermal Energy, and Land Planning.

He has been a Visiting Professor at MGIMO University, Peter the Great St. Petersburg Polytechnic University, and Gubkin Russian State University of Oil and Gas. He has also been an Invited Distinguished Lecturer at the University of Queensland and a Visiting Scholar at Flinders University and the National Center for Groundwater Research and Training.

== Political roles ==
Elected to the City Council of Turin in 2006, he was re-elected in 2011 and served as the leader of the Democratic Party in the Council until 2013, when he became Deputy Mayor for Urban Planning.

Re-elected in 2016, he led the Democratic Party in the City Council until his election as Mayor in 2021.

Since 2015, he has been the President of the Commission for Housing, Urban Planning, and Public Procurement of ANCI (Italian Municipalities National Association). In 2024, he was appointed Vice President of ANCI with responsibility for European and International Affairs and became the National Coordinator of Democratic Party Mayors.

He is the coordinator of the IREN public shareholders' agreement, president of the Fondazione Teatro Regio di Torino, and of the Fondazione per la Cultura Torino.

He is a member of the National Council for Development Cooperation at the Ministry of Foreign Affairs and International Cooperation as a representative of the National Association of Italian Municipalities (ANCI), is a member of the Congress of Local and Regional Authorities of the Council of Europe, serves as the Regional Vice President of Metropolis and as Vice Chair of OECD Champion Mayors for Inclusive Growth.

He completed the Bloomberg Harvard City Leadership Initiative Yearlong Mayors Program (2023–2024) and the Bloomberg LSE European City Leadership Initiative Program (2025–2026).

== Notes ==
Political offices
Preceded by Chiara Appendino	Mayor of Turin since 2021	Succeeded by incumbent
