= Valentino Castellani =

Italian politician (born 1940)

Valentino Castellani Olympic Order

President of the 2006 Winter Olympics Organising Committee
- In office 24 February 2002 – 26 February 2006
- IOC President: Juan Antonio Samaranch (1999–2001); Jacques Rogge (2001–06)
- Preceded by: Mitt Romney
- Succeeded by: John Furlong

Chair of the 2006 Winter Olympics Organising Committee
- In office 27 December 1999 – 7 July 2007
- Preceded by: Committee established
- Succeeded by: Position dissolved

Mayor of Turin
- In office 24 June 1993 – 28 May 2001
- Preceded by: Giovanna Cattaneo Incisa
- Succeeded by: Sergio Chiamparino

Personal details
- Born: 19 March 1940 (age 86) Varmo, Italy
- Party: Centre-left independent
- Education: Polytechnic University of Turin
- Profession: University professor

Valentino Castellani (born 19 March 1940) was the independent Mayor of Turin, Italy, from 24 June 1993 to 28 May 2001.

He is also a noted university professor and alumni of the Polytechnic University of Turin, where he got a master's degree in electronic engineering in 1963. Three years later, in 1966, he got his master's degree in electrical engineering at the MIT, in Boston. He is the author of some 70 scientific publications, some of which deal with the theory of transmission and coding applied to satellites and mobile communication. From 1999 to 2006 he was President of the Turin Organizing Committee, the organizing committee of the 2006 Winter Olympics in Turin.

He has lived in Turin for over forty years, is married and has three children.

Sporting positions
| Preceded by (United States) Mitt Romney | President of the Organizing Committee for Winter Olympic Games; 2006 | Succeeded by (Canada) John Furlong |
Political offices
| Preceded by Giovanna Cattaneo Incisa | Mayor of Turin; 1993-2001 | Succeeded by Sergio Chiamparino |
