= Civic list (Italy) =

Electoral list presented at a local election

Civic list (Lista civica) is the name given to an electoral list presented at an Italian local election which has no official connection with a national political party and which campaigns on local issues.

== Overview ==
Civic lists usually do not refer to political parties or ideologies and their programmes generally focus on territorial issues. The most common names for these non-aligned lists refer to the territory or to the candidate (for example: All together for X, where X is the name of the city, or Civic list for Y, where Y is the candidate). The civic list system is very encouraged in communal elections, in order to involve in the electoral process common citizens who do not support any political party. These lists are also present in provincial and regional elections and, more rarely, at national level.

== See also ==
- Grouping of electors
- Local election
- Localism (politics)
- Regionalism (politics)
