= Mario Finotti =

Italian photographer

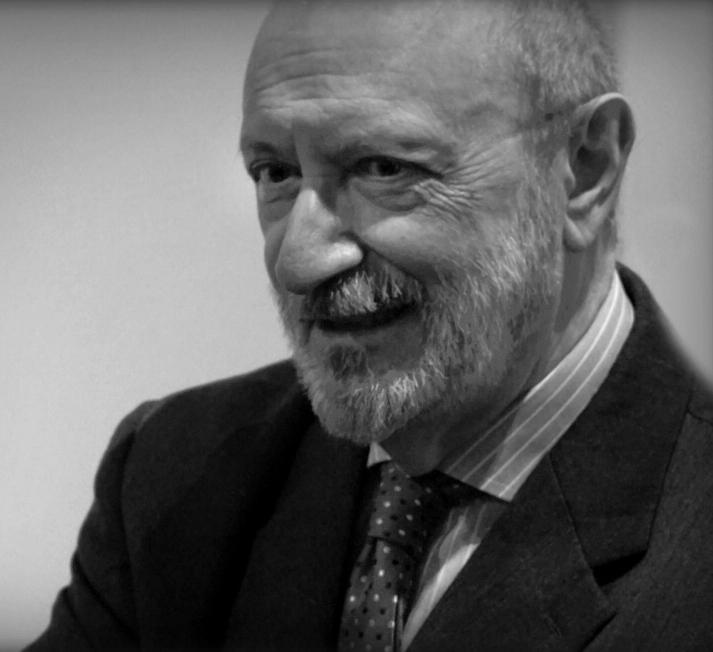
- Mario Finotti in 2023
- Born: March 19, 1950 (age 76); Novara
- Citizenship: Italian
- Occupations: Photographer, journalist
- Awards: Qualified European Photographer (QEP)

Mario Finotti (born March 19, 1950) is an Italian photographer and journalist.

== Biography ==
He was born in Novara in 1950, living with his family in via Dolores Bello. At the age of ten, on hot summer afternoons, he often sneaked into the nearby Faraggiana-Ferrandi natural history museum, where he observed with fascination the stuffed animals and artifacts from Africa and South America, brought back by explorers Ugo Ferrandi, Guido Boggiani, and Alessandro Faraggiana. This early exposure to an exotic world sparked the curiosity that would later characterise his professional career.

He attended the Tornielli Bellini secondary school for teacher education, graduating in 1968.

=== 1970s ===
Thanks to the fact that the area where he lived was, at the time, a true "photography district" — home to two historic studios, the laboratories of Carlo Anadone and the Lavatelli brothers – he began to take an interest in photography in the early 1970s, choosing it as his preferred medium of expression and identifying Anadone himself as one of his key influences. This activity marked the beginning of his professional career, which started at the advertising agency of Aldo Beldì — at the time one of the leading figures in Italian advertising and among the first to offer full-service campaigns.

Initially working in a secondary role, he later took on the management of the photographic studio, although this experience lasted only one year. He then moved into newspaper journalism, first at Gazzetta del Popolo — another brief stint – and later at the provincial editorial office of La Stampa, with which he collaborated for 34 years. He also worked with Corriere di Novara, which lists him among its contributors. His work gave him a thorough understanding of the Novara journalism scene, although he never felt fully part of it. In a 2021 interview, he stated that covering two criminal cases – the Mazzotti and Graneris trials held at the Novara court between 1977 and 1978 – was fundamental to his professional development.

In 1973 he married Laura Borgini from Garbagna Novarese, to whose village he later moved.

=== From 1980s and early 2000s ===
Since 1985, he has produced numerous reports for the Istituto Geografico De Agostini, both within Italy and internationally.

He considered political involvement on several occasions, running for municipal elections as a candidate for the Italian Communist Party (PCI) in Novara in 1983 and in Garbagna Novarese in 1990.

Alongside his work as a photojournalist, he developed a passion for photography in the advertising sector and in literary production – primarily photographic books – which over time led him to prioritize these pursuits over journalism. The first volume mentioned in official biographies dates back to 1980, concerning the De Pagave retirement home in Novara and produced with the journalist Mario Giarda. Between the 1990s and 2000s, he received numerous commissions from public institutions, including the municipality of Gattico, the National Confederation of Crafts (Confederazione Nazionale dell'Artigianato), Emergency and the Camera di Commercio of Novara.

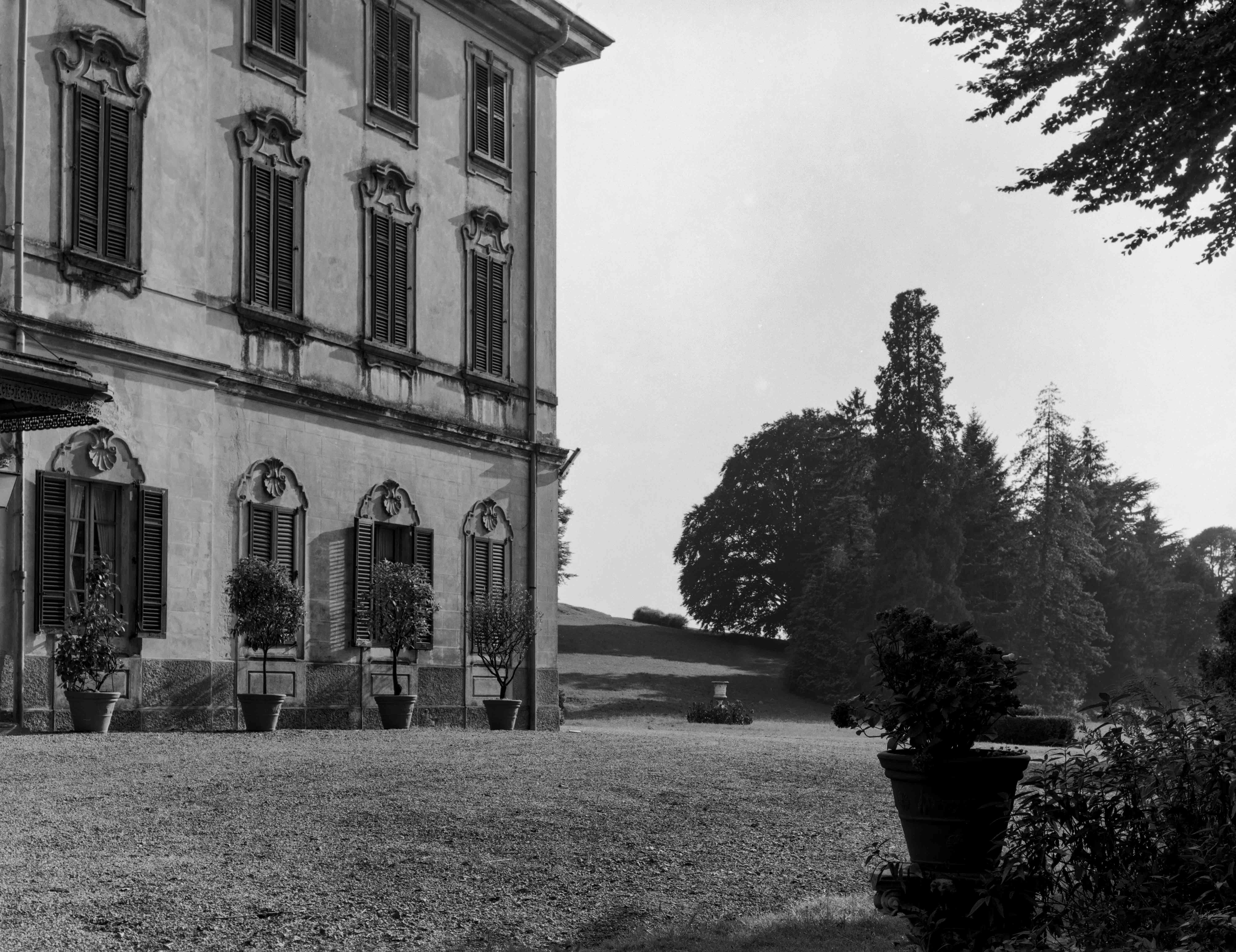
Villa Leonardi, in Gattico (1996)

It was in the literary field that, between 1998 and 2001, he accepted a commission that marked a turning point in his career. The Department of Culture of the Province of Novara tasked him with creating a work focused on interpreting the local landscape through the lens of industrial archaeology. At the time, the provincial administration was responsible for much of the landscape and territorial planning. During discussions over the project's scope, Finotti proposed dividing the work into three parts, each dedicated to a different aspect of the landscape and its history, to be carried out over three consecutive years: the first part, accompanied by an exhibition, on industrial archaeology and entitled The places of production (I luoghi della produzione); the second entitled The places of worship (I luoghi del culto); the third on spontaneous architecture, that is to say centered on spontaneous architecture – that is, landscape interventions born out of the immediate needs of ordinary people, which often shape the territory more profoundly than works by renowned architects, entitled The places of everyday life (I luoghi del quotidiano). The first part, sponsored and produced by Nicola Trussardi, with whom Finotti had direct contact, is regarded by the author as one of the best catalogues of his work, despite its polished and advertising-oriented approach. Finotti acknowledges that the qualitative leap was partly due to his decision to use a view camera, a tool particularly well-suited to architectural photography.

Novara seen by Mario Finotti
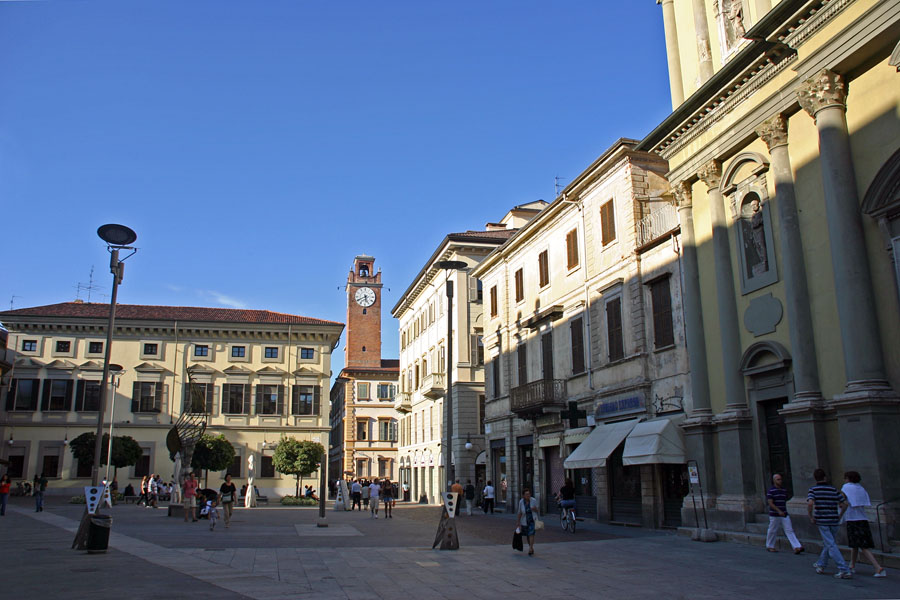
- Having documented life in Novara for over half a century, Finotti shared his views on the city in a 2024 interview with La Stampa journalist Barbara Cottavoz. Gramsci Square, in the centre of Novara Speaking with evident bitterness, he described Novara as an impoverished city, in various respects. The first issue he highlighted is urban decay, illustrated by the example of the many shuttered storefronts along Corso Cavour. In the past, living in the city centre offered the opportunity to engage with a vibrant and diverse social fabric through the lively world of shops and small businesses. Today, this vitality has been lost, replaced by offices and professional studios. He also pointed to the absence of prominent cultural figures in Novara, such as poets and writers like Sandro Bermani and Giulio Genocchio. The same, he noted, applies to the political sphere, which he saw as lacking personalities who are respected across party lines for the clarity of their vision – such as Ezio Leonardi, Armando Riviera, and Maurizio Pagani. Finally, his critique extended to the business sector, which, in his view, no longer had a meaningful impact on local life. He concluded his reflections by expressing regret over the many talented individuals who have left the city to have their professionalism recognized elsewhere, such as the musician Massimo Fiocchi Malaspina. He ended with the hope that the artistic, archaeological, and ethnological heritage still stored in the warehouses of Biandrate will once again be made accessible to the public.

=== From 2000s ===
Since 2000, he has collaborated with the series of volumes published by the Consorzio Mutue of Novara, an organization primarily engaged in providing health care coverage, which in that same year began publishing two annual volumes reserved for its members: one released at Christmas, focusing on cultural, landscape, and historical aspects of Novara and featuring contributions from various local scholars; and another, published in May, dedicated to biographical profiles of notable figures from Novara's past. In this context, he has worked alongside numerous local historians of note, including Emiliana Mongiat, Lorenzo Del Boca, Giampietro Morreale, and Giancarlo Andenna, as well as writers such as Sebastiano Vassalli.

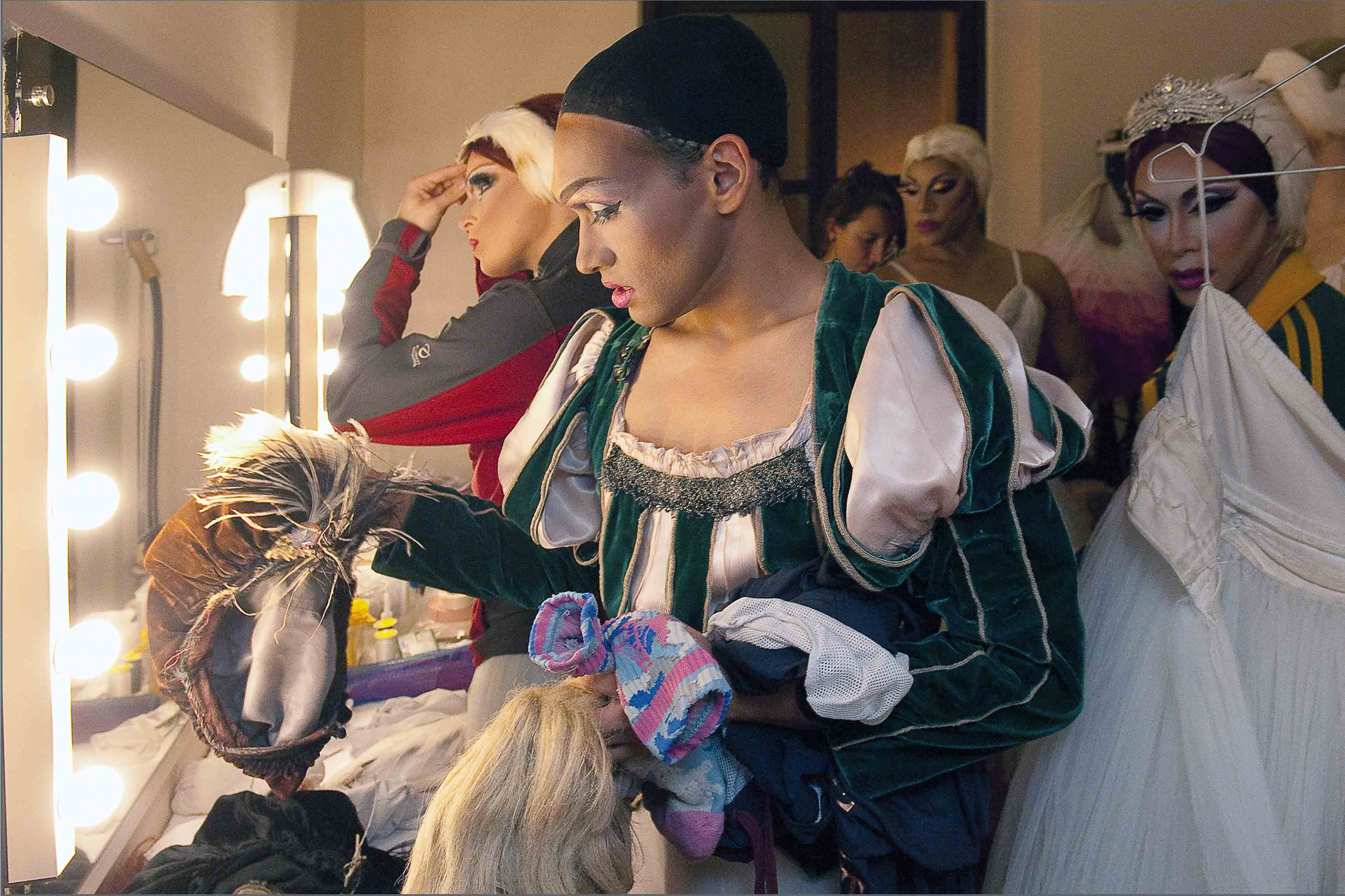
Les Ballets Trockadero, at Teatro Coccia of Novara (2016)

Since 2010, he has served as the stage photographer for the Teatro Coccia, documenting its productions. This professional experience is also a source of strong emotional involvement for him, due to the evocative power of working in a place so rich in history and art.

During the same period, he began a personal exploration more oriented towards artistic expression, reinterpreting – through a subjective lens – the themes that had long engaged him: landscapes, works of art, the human figure, and everyday objects. His approach drew on personal experience and aimed to evoke emotions and memories, with particular attention to the traces that time leaves on places and things.

In 2023 he donated his rich archive to the Historical Institute of the Resistance of Novara: five boxes of photographs on Novara city life between the 80s and 90s. For the occasion, an exhibition was organized at the Broletto.

== The photographer ==
In the 2021 interview he talks about himself by not defining himself as a paparazzo at all, but on the contrary having always cultivated and preferred advertising, landscape and industrial archaeology photography. The interest in the landscape of the southern part of the Province of Novara (Bassa Novarese), in particular, has been at the origin of several works and exhibitions.

Regarding the transition to digital photography, he admits that it affected him and that it took him a few months to master the new equipment and the post-production technique of the images. However, he considers himself satisfied with the transition, since the work is less demanding, with few contraindications, with full control of each single step of the image management[. However, he warns about the disadvantages of digital, mainly related to the contradictions that it introduces into the language of photography itself, given that total control easily allows one to distance oneself from reality.

He considers several photographers as models for his work, of whom he has great respect, including Gianni Berengo Gardin e Francesco Radino.

His opinion on portrait is very clear: to portray a person it is necessary to know and understand them, therefore to be involved in their experience, without prejudice, in order to make choices that lead to the most faithful representation.

=== Finotti and industrial archaeology ===
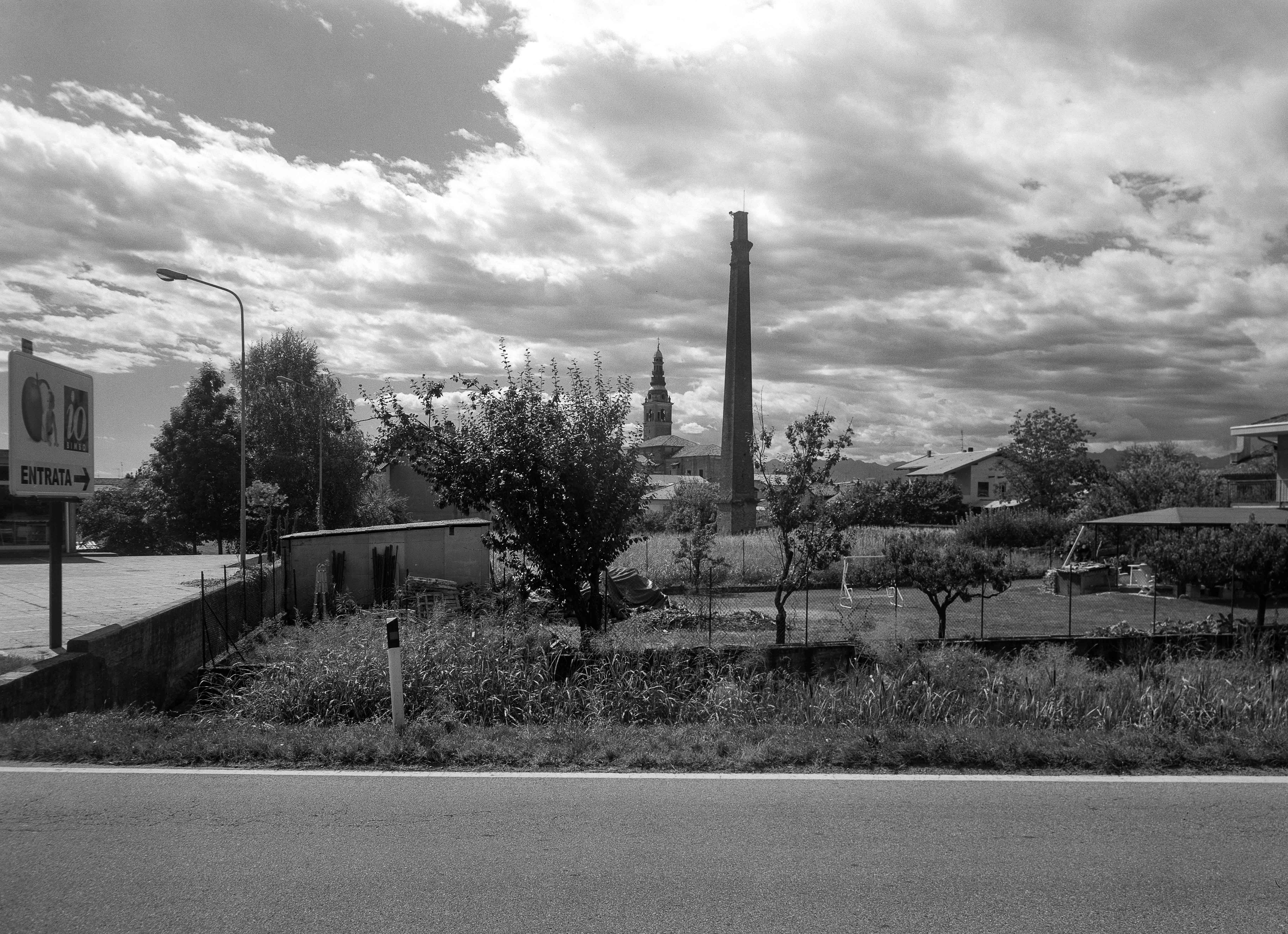
Chimney of Bottacchi furnace, in Ghemme (1997)

In 1997, the historian and art critic Marco Rosci from Novara described the distinctive features of Finotti's investigation into local industrial archaeology, emphasizing that his work goes beyond simple documentation or reportage of the state of things, taking the form of research, analysis, understanding, and interpretation. In this way, it bears witness to the transformation of Novara's productive landscape, reflecting its complex cultural identity in a territory where traces of industrialization are intertwined with rural and agricultural memory.

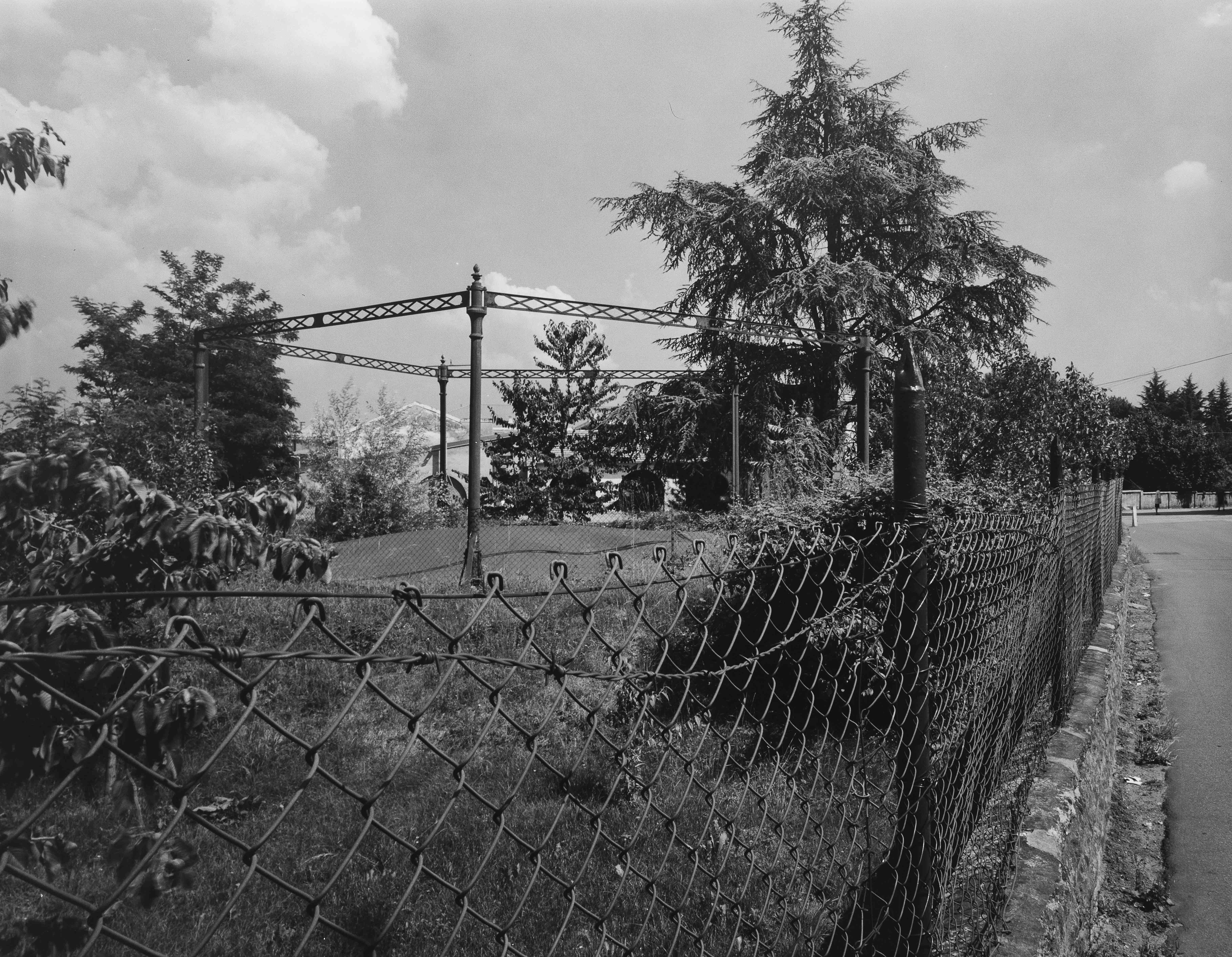
Gasometer of Oleggio (1997)

In Finotti's work, Rosci observes that, on the one hand, many images highlight the formal essentiality of industrial structures, underlining their functionality and geometry; on the other, the research shifts toward a more nuanced reading of the environmental context, where human artifacts coexist with the persistence (or resistance) of natural elements. Among the latter, water stands out – channeled, regulated, and mechanized through locks and barriers – as does the vegetation along its banks: recurring elements that bear witness to the coexistence of human intervention and nature. This approach creates a visual and conceptual dialectic between artifact and environment, elevating the photographic investigation from simple industrial documentation to a deeper analysis of the landscape and its history. The deliberate avoidance of any "picturesque" or aestheticizing effect reinforces this approach, favoring an essential, sober, and analytical photographic language.

Rosci thus situates Finotti within the artistic currents stemming from the Bauhaus and from the German and American industrial objective painting of the 1920s, with which he shares a focus on production spaces and their transformations. As evidence of this, his images of disused and abandoned warehouses recall the atmospheres of buildings that have since been converted into contemporary art galleries or collective production centers in Milan, Turin, and Naples.

== Awards ==
In 2000, he was awarded the Qualified European Photographer (QEP) title in the portrait category by a special commission convened in Dijon, becoming one of the first in Italy to receive this recognition.

== Works ==
The interest in history, characters, work, environment and architecture are the basis of the creation of dozens of photographic books and many personal exhibitions on these themes.

- Mario Finotti; Mario Giarda (1980). De Pagave: storia e immagini di un'istituzione novarese [De Pagave: history and images of a Novara institution] (in Italian). Novara: Banca Popolare di Novara.
- Mario Finotti (1996). Comune di Gattico (ed.). Gattico 1996 (in Italian). presentazione di Diego Boca. Novara: Interlinea (catalogue of the exhibition, Gattico, 1996–1997).
- Mario Finotti; Franco F. Ferrario; Emiliana Mongiat (2000). I cortili della memoria – Un itinerario nel centro storico di Novara [The courtyards of memory – An itinerary in the historic center of Novara] (in Italian). Novara: Interlinea.
- Mario Finotti; Mario Giarda (2003). Novara – Ritratto di una città [Novara – Portrait of a town] (in Italian). Novara: Comune di Novara.
- Mario Finotti; Vittore Fossati; Francesco Radino (2007). Il riso – Territorio, cultura, lavoro [Rice – Territory, culture, work] (in Italian). Parma: Diabasis.
- Mario Finotti (2008). Abitare il lago [Living the Lake] (in Italian). Provincia di Novara.
- Renato Ambiel; Mario Finotti (2012). Un anno in A – Novara Calcio 2011–2012 [A year in Serie A – Novara Calcio 2011–2012] (in Italian). Novara: Interlinea.

=== For the Department of Culture ===
- Mario Finotti (1994). Roberto Moroni (ed.). Quarantaquattro artisti novaresi [Forty-four artists from Novara] (in Italian).
- Mario Finotti; Marzio Torchio (1996). Ritratti artigiani [Artisan portraits] (in Italian).
- Mario Finotti; Anna Maria Boca; Marco Rosci (1997). I luoghi della produzione – Immagini di archeologia industriale nella Provincia di Novara [The places of production- Images of industrial archaeology in the Province of Novara] (in Italian). Milano: Fondazione Trussardi.
- Mario Finotti (2000). I luoghi del quotidiano [The places of everyday life] (in Italian). Novara: Provincia di Novara.
- Mario Finotti; Franca Franzoni; Giorgio G. Negri; Giovanna Broggi (2001). Le acque governate – Storia e memoria del paesaggio novarese [The governed waters – History and memory of the Novara landscape] (in Italian). Novara: Interlinea.

=== For Consorzio Mutue ===
- Mario Finotti (2003). Novara nell'Ottocento [Novara in the 19th century] (in Italian). Novara: Consorzio Mutue (with a text by Sebastiano Vassalli).
- Mario Finotti (2007). Il patrimonio del povero [The heritage of the poor]. Antiche istituzioni novaresi (in Italian). Novara: Consorzio Mutue.
- Mario Finotti; Emiliana Mongiat (2008). L'universo in una stanza [The universe in a room] (in Italian). Novara: Consorzio Mutue.
- Mario Finotti (2009). La forma del verde [The shape of green] (in Italian). Novara: Consorzio Mutue.

== Image gallery ==
=== Portraits ===
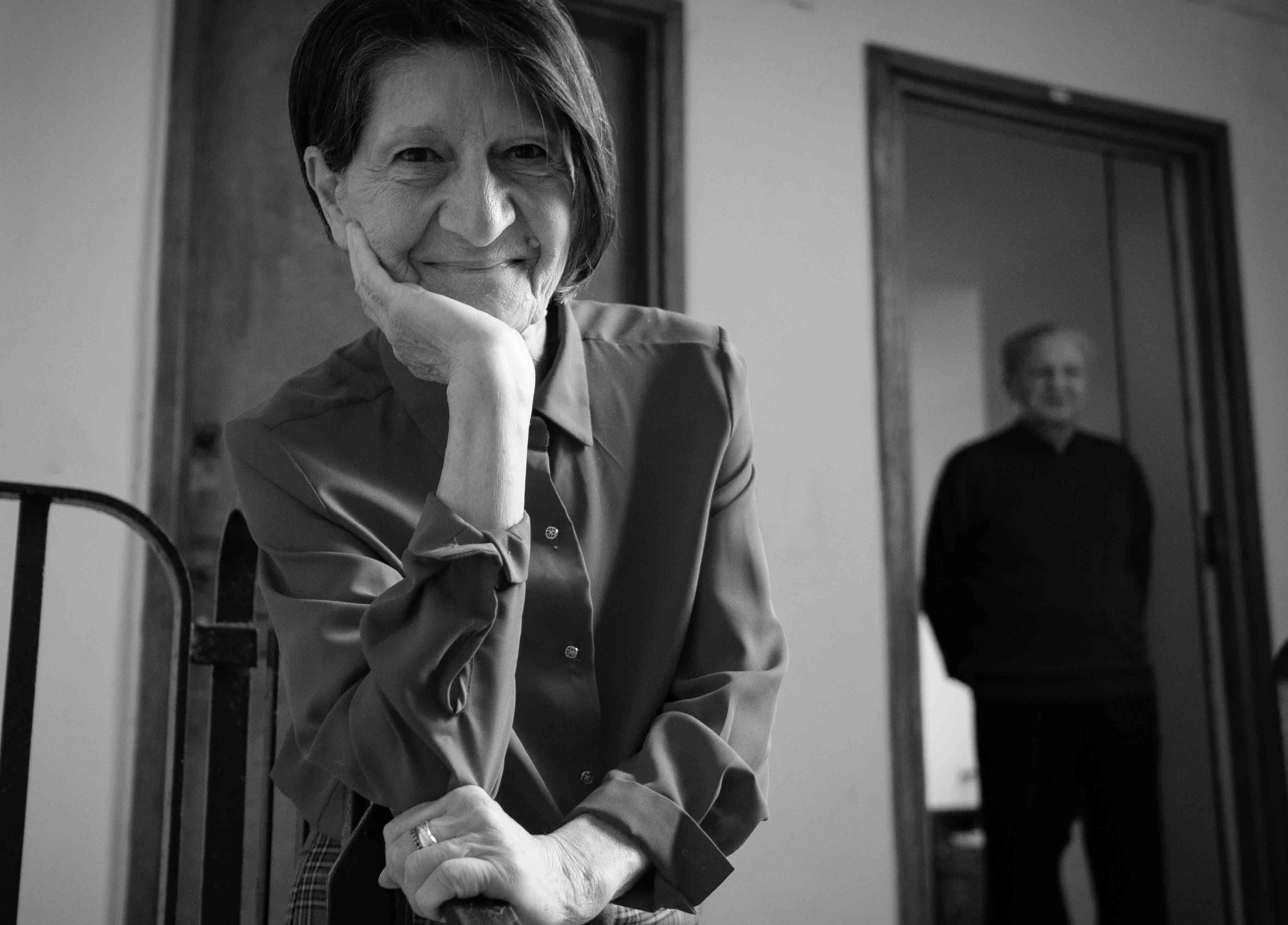
Dalmatian refugees in Novara (2024)

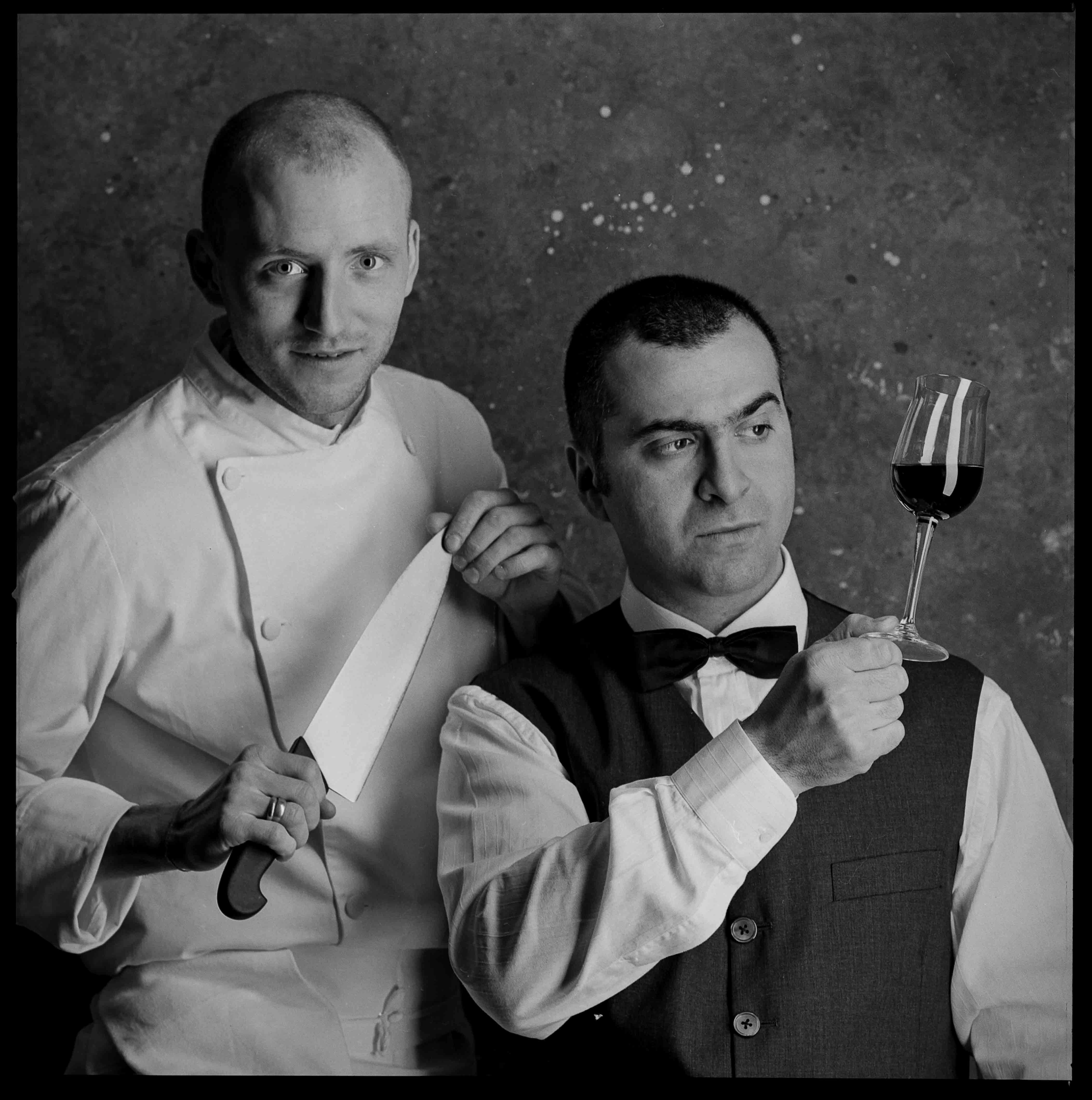
Owners of the "I due ladroni" tavern in Novara (1995)

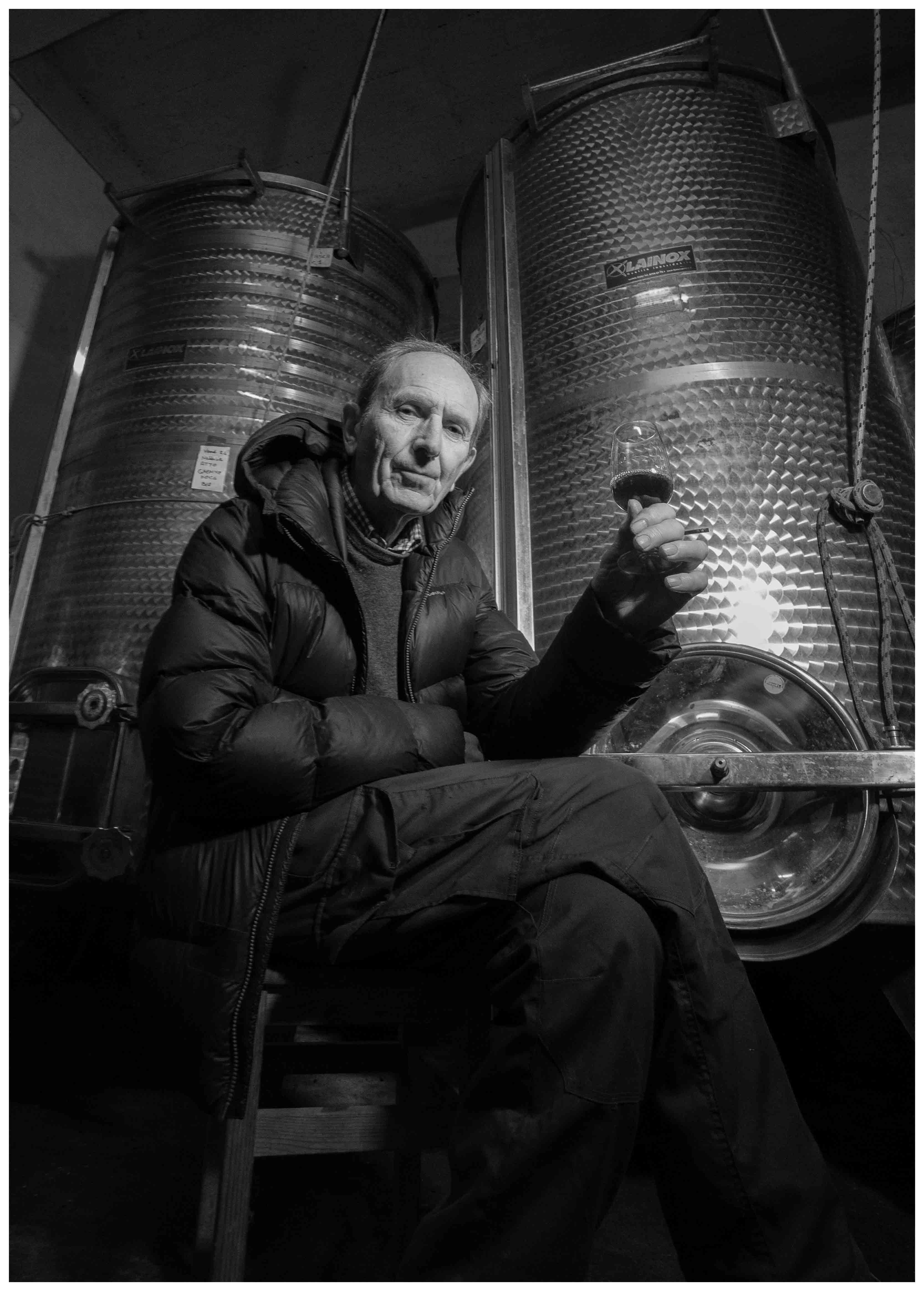
Old winemaker in Ghemme (2025)

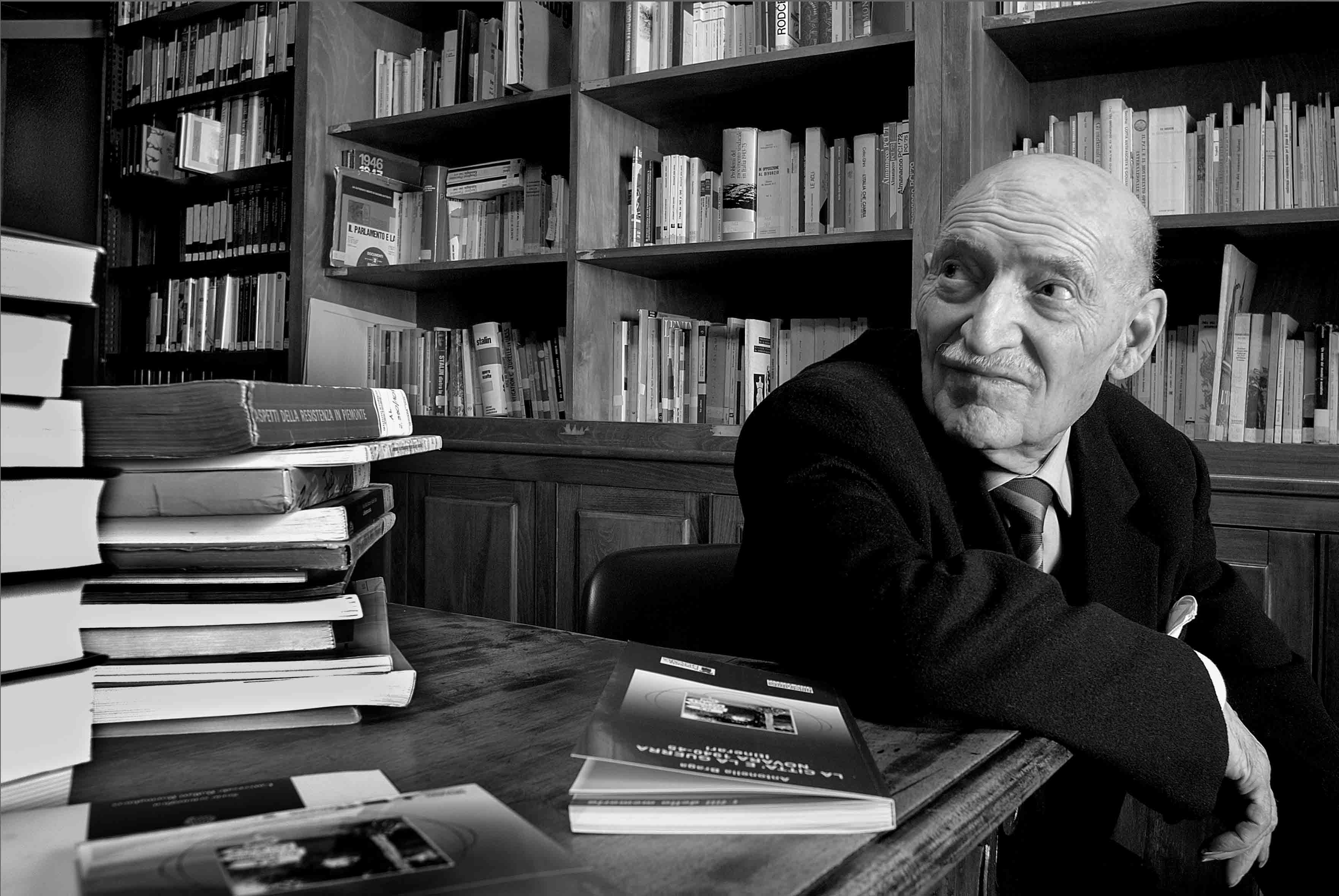
Enrico Massara, partisan and politician (1998)

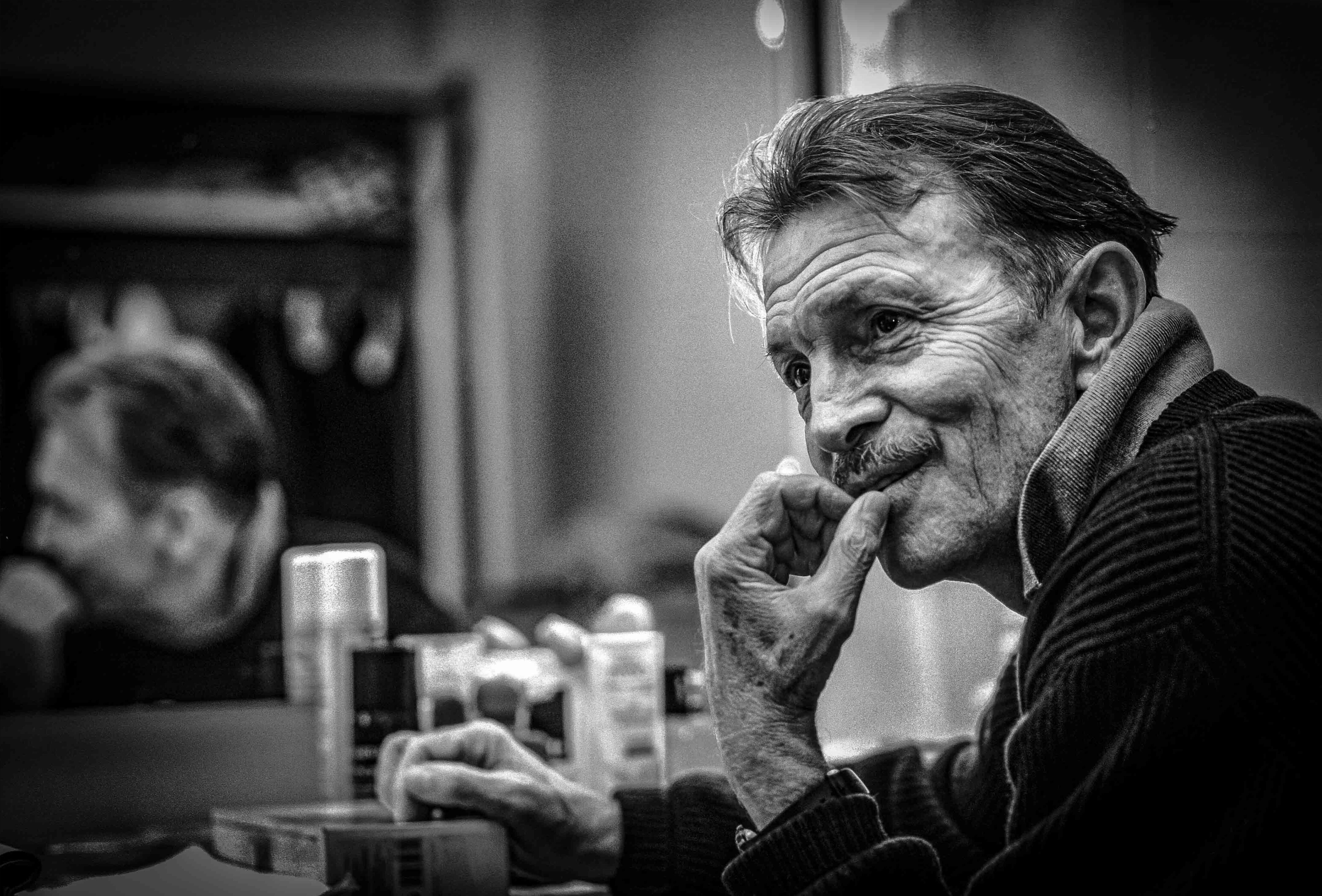
Umberto Orsini, actor (1987)

=== Industrial archaeology ===
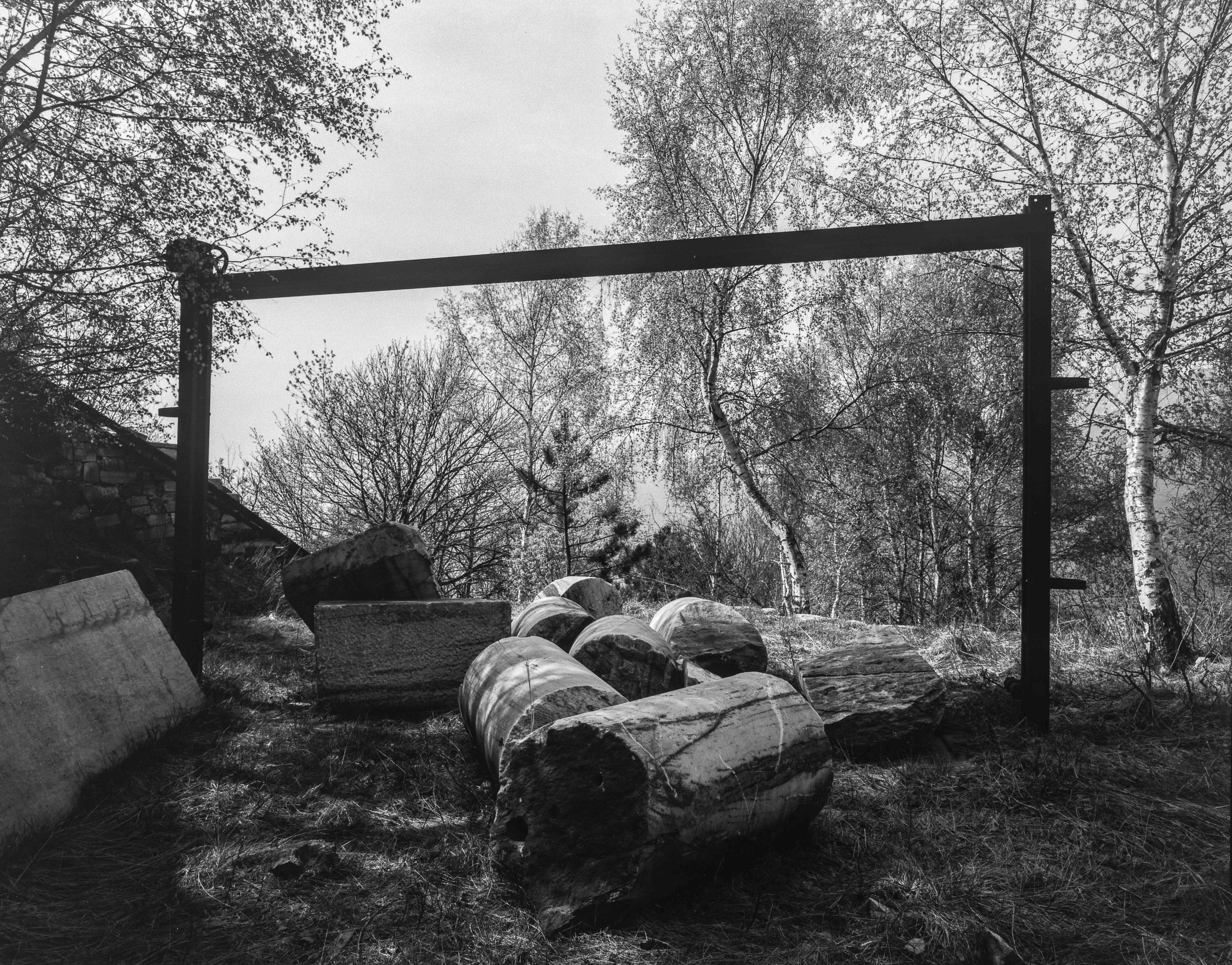
Marble quarries of Candoglia (1998)

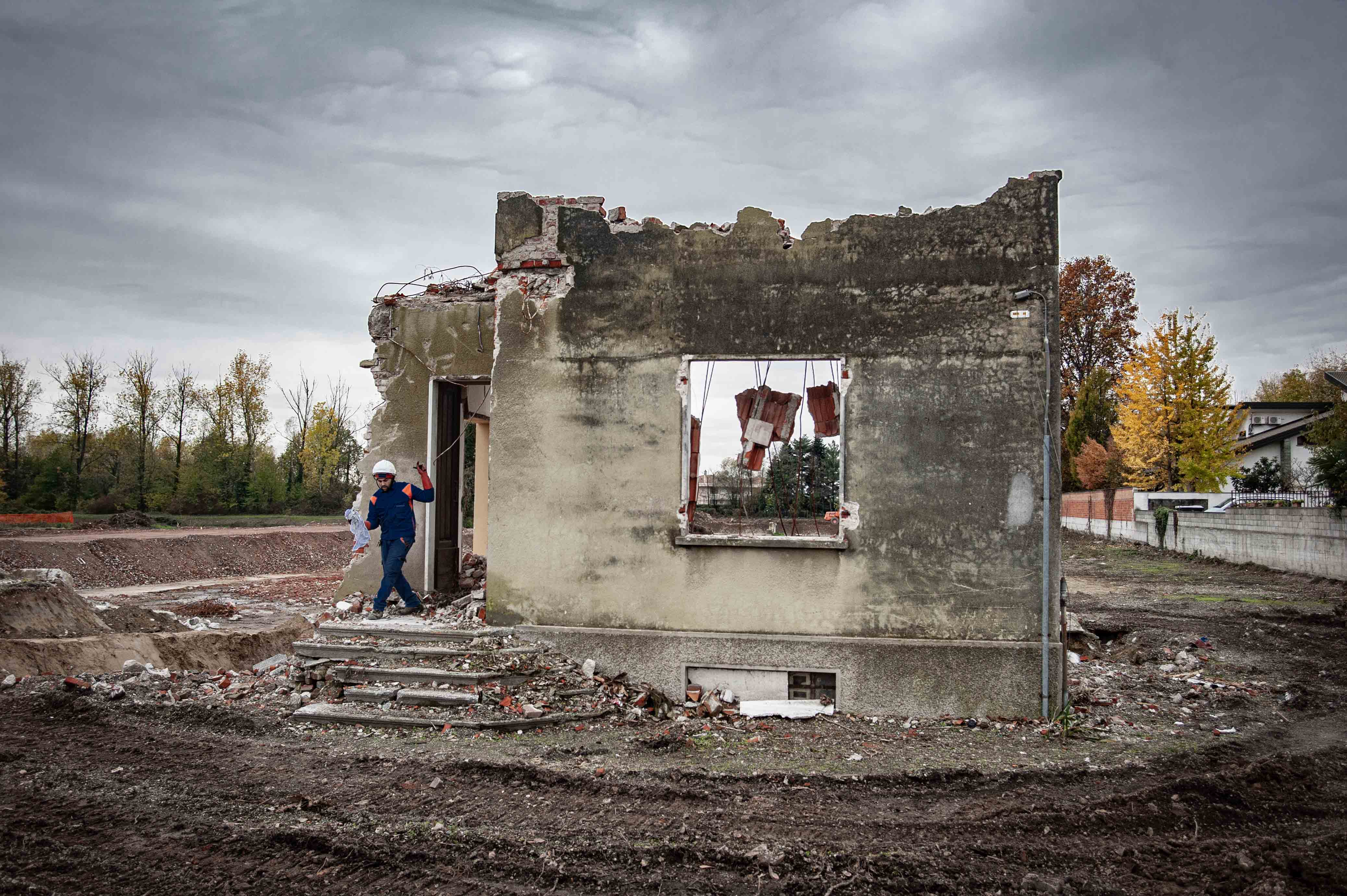
Demolition of the Giustina furnace in Novara (2019)

== See also ==
- Industrial archaeology
- Portrait photography
- Province of Novara

== Bibliography ==
- Ambiel, Renato; Bottacchi, Roberto; Finotti, Mario (2023). Ho visto cose – Mezzo secolo di cronaca novarese attraverso l'obiettivo di Mario Finotti [I've seen things – Half a century of Novarese news through the lens of Mario Finotti] (in Italian). Novara: Comune di Novara.
