= Bermani =

Bermani may refer to:

- Bermani Ilir, a district (kecamatan) of Kepahiang Regency, Bengkulu, Indonesia.
- Cesare Bermani (born 1937), Italian author and historian
- Gaia Bermani Amaral (born 1980), Brazilian-Italian actress, model and television presenter
