= Giaccone =

Giaccone is a surname. Notable people with the surname include:

- Andrea Giaccone, Italian politician
- Enrico Giaccone (1896–1923), Italian racing driver
- Giuseppe Giaccone (1900–1986), Italian football goalkeeper
- Lautaro Giaccone (born 2001), Argentine football attacking midfielder
- Mario Giaccone (born 1945), Italian sporting director and former amateur road cyclist
- Paolo Giaccone, Italian forensic pathologist
- Philip Giaccone (1932–1981), American mobster
