= Mario Giaccone =

Italian cyclist

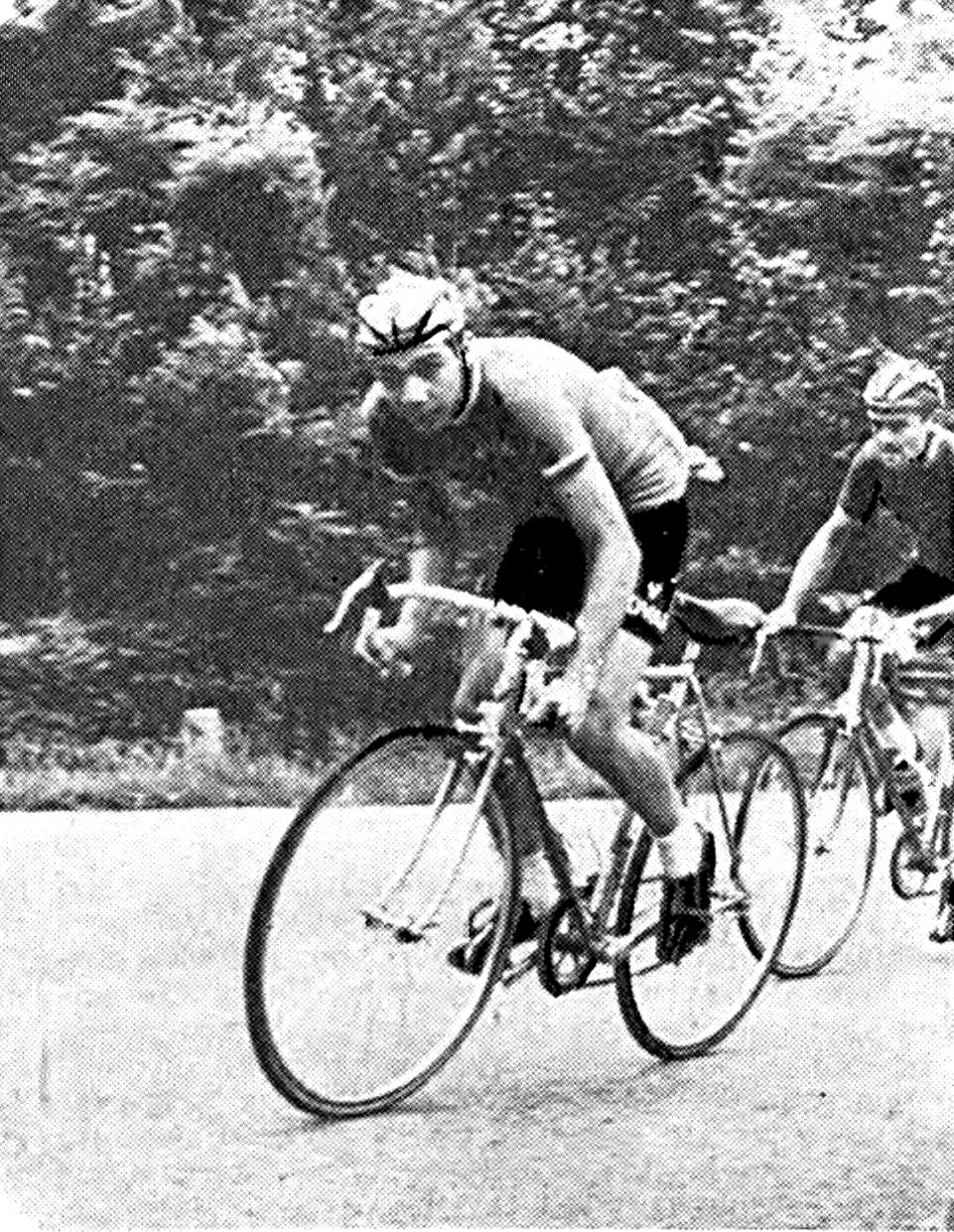
- Mario Giaccone in 1967

Personal information
- Nickname: Giacon
- Born: June 21, 1945 (age 81) Taranto, Italy

Cycling career
- Sport: Cycling
- Discipline: Road
- Role: Rider

Amateur teams
- 1961–1966: Velo Club Novarese
- 1967–1968: S.C. Corsico
- 1969–1971: S.C. Pedale Ravennate
- 1972: S.C. Triplex Ponzone

Managerial team
- 1975–2024: Velo Club Novarese

Mario Giaccone (born 21 June 1945) is a retired Italian amateur road cyclist and sporting director. He achieved international success in the late 1960s and later became a notable figure in Italian amateur cycling administration.

He has raced several times in the national team, under the guidance of coach Elio Rimedio.

== Biography ==
Giaccone was born in Taranto to Natale (from Vignale Monferrato, Piedmont) and Sebastiana Cannavò (from Acireale, Sicily). He arrived in Novara at the age of nine.

He learned to ride on his father's bicycle, competing before the age of 16 on a Bianchi «Tour de France».

He studied at the Industrial Technical Institute for Knitwear and Textile Experts in Novara.

=== 1960s ===
He began competing in 1961, with the Velo Club Novarese team, of which he was also captain. At the same time he studied in Milan to be a dental technician and worked in a dental laboratory in Novara.

In the early days, despite the intense training he undertook with passion, he failed to achieve the expected results. The resulting disappointment brought him to the verge of giving up. It was then that De Giorgi, a fellow member of the Velo Club Novarese, stepped in. Convinced that the young man's temperament would take him far, he took him under his wing, offering motivation and encouragement, and helped him find the inner strength to carry on. The results soon followed: in 1966, he recorded 15 victories and 10 second-place finishes.

In 1966, furthermore, after finishing the Fossano stage of the Giro del Piemonte, he met Elio Rimedio, the national team's coach, who introduced him to the Italian competitions.

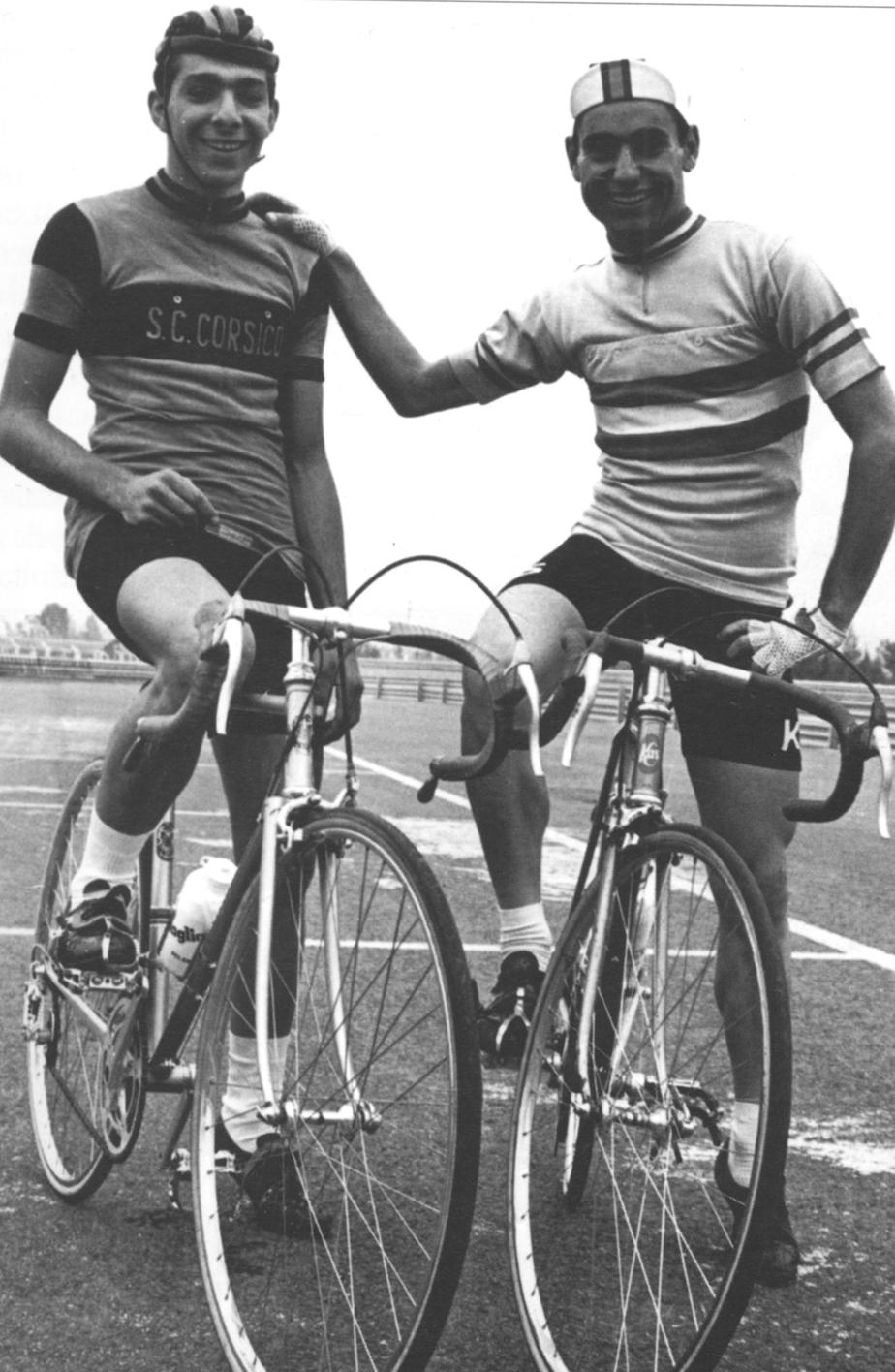
Mario Giaccone and Gabriel Mascaró Febrer, in Mexico City, in 1967

In 1967 he achieved his first major success, competing for the Italian national team at the Mediterranean Games and finishing third in the road race, won by Costantino Conti. Still wearing the Italian national team, the same year he took part in the Road World Championships in Heerlen, Holland, where he only managed a 15th place, due to a fall a few metres from the finish line.

At the end of the season he finished 12th in the Tour de l'Avenir, a competition that he remembers very challenging due to the large climbs, taking several stage placings and wearing the leader's jersey in two stages. By October he had achieved 12 victories.

Furthermore, in 1967 he received an offer to become a professional from Molteni team, which he refused in order to continue his adventure with the national team. However, he moved to the S.C. Corsico team. He eventually graduated as a dental technician and opened a dental practice with a colleague.

In 1968, during the second stage of the Tour de l'Avenir, he crashed into a car while he was leading alone. The fractures he suffered prevented him from participating in the Olympics, so he took advantage of the situation to do his military service. However, he closed the year with 14 victories.

=== 1970s ===
He took part in the 1970 Peace Race, reaching 13th place in the general classification. In the Giro Ciclistico d'Italia, the amateur edition of the Giro d'Italia, he placed third behind the winner Giancarlo Bellini. The results obtained earned him the «Trofeo Stadio», received in Modena the 2nd December, as the best Italian amateur of the year.

In an interview with Gino Ardemagni, regarding the possibility of turning professional after many requests, he stated:

Oh no, not professionalism. Not for stupid reasons of sports ethics, because money disfigures the purity of passion: all bullshit, I earn even as an amateur. But because professionalism is a nasty beast: either you manage to catch it by the tail, ride it, or if it knocks you off your feet and good night. I mean that as a professional you either make it or you stop. I don't intend to stop. I like cycling too much.

— Interview with Gino Ardemagni, 1970

In 1971 he won the Giro delle Valli Aretine, one of the most important amateur road races in Italy. The same year he was hired by the S.C. Pedale Ravennate team.

In 1972, an accident during a race in Borgomanero cut short his racing career, which he then closed with 64 victories, obtained in the V.C. Novarese and S.C. Pedale Ravennate teams.

However, his abandonment of competitive activity did not coincide with his abandonment of cycling: he returned to the V.C. Novarese with organizational roles and in 1975 he was elected president, a position he would hold for at least four decades.

At the end of the decade he was involved in the preparation of athletes on behalf of the Italian Cycling Federation, and in the meanwhile he moved to Garbagna Novarese.

=== From 1980s to 2000s ===
In 1983 and 1988 he ran for the municipal elections of Novara, as an independent, on the socialist list of Armando Riviera.

In 1998 he lost his father Natale, aged 84, in 2004 his mother Sebastiana, aged 80.

In 1995 he ran for the municipal council of Garbagna Novarese, being elected among the minority councillors. In 1999 he ran again, on the same list, among others, as the photographer Mario Finotti.

=== 2010s ===
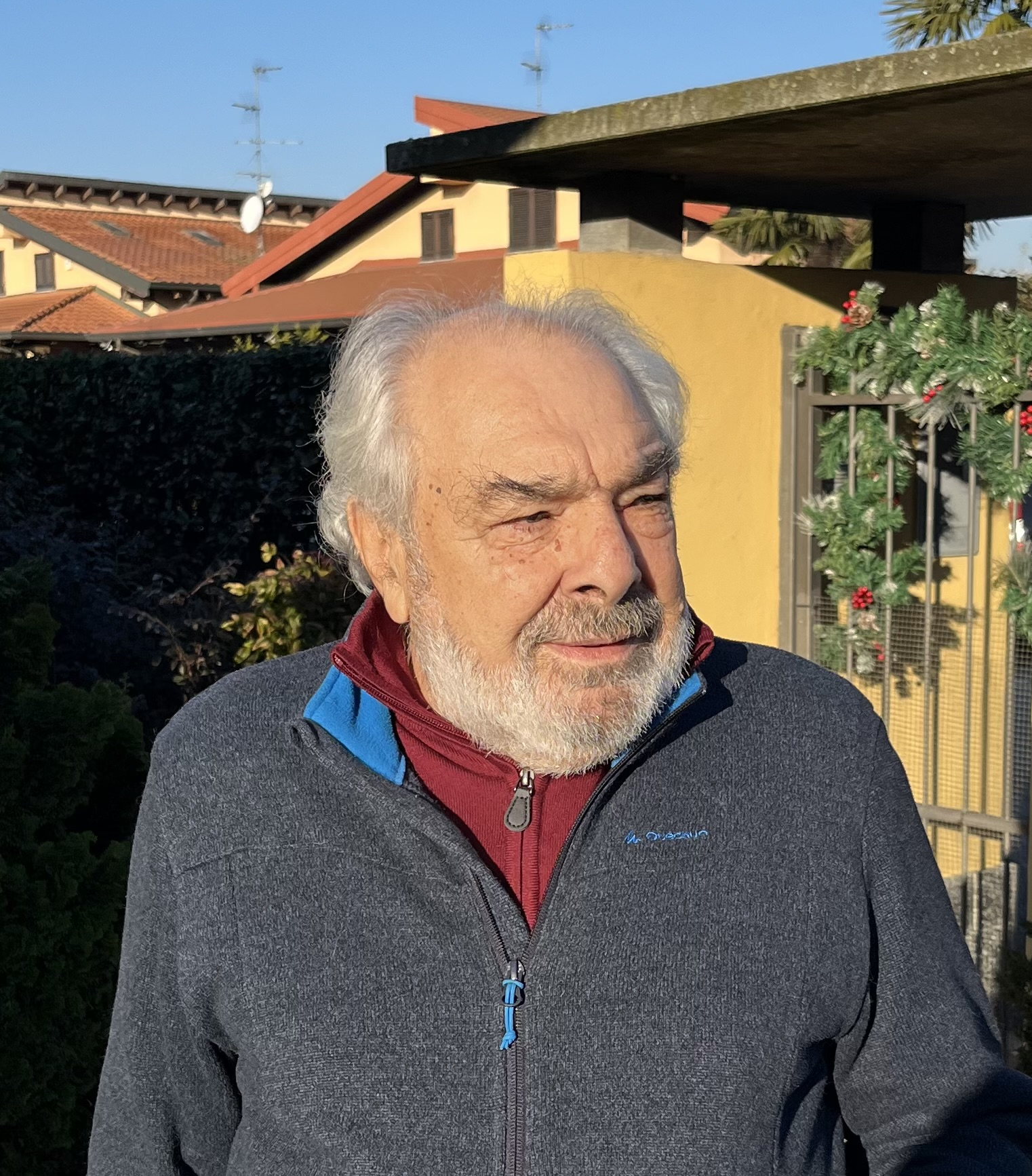
Mario Giaccone in 2024

In 2014, retired and living in Nibbiola, on the occasion of Vincenzo Nibali's victory at the Tour de France, he was interviewed by Corriere di Novara. He stated a new phase of cycling had started and Nibali was part of it, as a representative of a decisive change compared to the more controversial past. Giaccone admired his strong personality, direct communication and respect for people and situations, together with great lucidity and constant attention: characteristics that made him a strongly positive figure, suitable to be a model for young people.

In 2019 the Italian National Olympic Committee awarded him with Stella d'Argento al Merito Sportivo (Silver Star for Sporting Merit).

As part of the celebrations for the awarding of the prize for the European City of Sport 2025 to Novara, the Minister for Sport and Youth Andrea Abodi awarded Mario Giaccone the title of Alfiere dello sport (Standard Bearer of Sport), for his contribution to cycling culture.

== The sportsman ==
A runner, he did well on multiple terrains. Initially, he was solely a climber, but later he also became a rouleur.

In a 2014 interview he said he had always been in love with cycling, almost obsessed, to the point of training at 3 in the morning, pedaling on the roads of Lake Maggiore where trucks passed, which he followed because they lit up the path. More precisely, his training included waking up at 3 am twice a week, while on the remaining days of relaxation training he got up at dawn. The activity then continued until 8 am. Remembering all this, he is convinced that only those who have practiced cycling can understand the life of a runner.

Due to his reckless approach to races, he has suffered from numerous falls and fractures.

Several journalists of the national press dedicated articles to him: Gino Sala (l'Unità) described him as combative and aggressive; Nino Rota (La Gazzetta dello Sport) attributed to him a discreet personality that attracted the antipathy of numerous opponents during the race, together with notable cunning and intelligence; Gino Ardemagni (Tuttosport) confirmed the impression of cunning and shrewdness.

In his early days, he raced impetuously, driven above all by instinct and an impulsive temperament, going all-in every time and often reaching the finish line completely exhausted. Over time, however, he adopted a more calculated approach to racing: having established himself as a top rider and consequently being more closely marked, he was forced to adapt and begin planning both his race strategy and energy expenditure more carefully.

Regarding doping he expressed a clear opinion: those who use it deserve a lifetime ban.

== The sports manager ==
In 1986, during the celebrations for the 60th anniversary of the team Velo Club Novarese, he expressed concern about the awareness of the void that was forming around the cyclism, a feeling shared by the entire management of the company. In response to this, he declared, his management followed the objective of creating a point of reference capable of attracting and motivating young people, in the belief that sport could represent a concrete answer to the sense of confusion in which the new generations were struggling. He also expressed the hope of reviving that particular atmosphere of the 1950s, when cycling set the city streets alight, involving and entertaining the public.

== Major results ==
1966
1st Tortona - San Maurizio d'Opaglio

1967
1st Trofeo Caduti Medesi
3rd Overall Mediterranean Games
12th Overall Tour de l'Avenir

2nd Stage 1
3rd Stage 9
3rd Stage 10

1968
3rd Pre-Olympics in Mexico City
3rd Gran Premio della Liberazione

1970
1st Coppa Città del Marmo
1st Coppa Varignana
2nd Amateur edition of Six Days of Milan (team with Daniele Avogadri)
3rd Overall Giro Ciclistico d'Italia
13th Overall Peace Race

10th Stage 6
4th Stage 8
2nd Stage 13

1971
1st Giro Valli Aretine
4th Overall Giro Ciclistico d'Italia

3rd Stage 8

1972
1st Trofeo Raffaele Marcoli
