= Maurizio Pagani =

Italian engineer and politician (1936–2014)

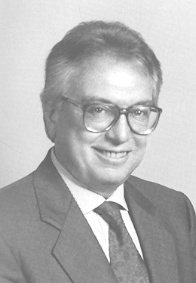

Minister of Post and Telecommunications
- In office 28 June 1992 – 9 May 1994
- Prime Minister: Giuliano Amato; Carlo Azeglio Ciampi

President of the Province of Novara
- In office 28 June 1999 – 28 June 2004
- Preceded by: Paolo Cattaneo
- Succeeded by: Sergio Vedovato

Mayor of Novara
- In office 1978–1981
- Preceded by: Ezio Leonardi
- Succeeded by: Armando Riviera

Personal details
- Born: 27 January 1936 Milan, Kingdom of Italy
- Died: 7 February 2014 (aged 78) Novara, Italy
- Party: PSDI (until 1998); Independent (1999–2001); FI (since 2001)
- Spouse: Daniela Pagani
- Children: 1
- Education: Polytechnic University of Milan

Maurizio Pagani (27 January 1936 – 7 February 2014) was an Italian engineer and politician who served as the minister of post and telecommunications during the period 1992–1994 in two successive cabinets, and as the mayor of Novara.

== Early life and education ==
Pagani was born in Milan on 27 January 1936. He received a bachelor's degree in hydraulic engineering from the Polytechnic University of Milan.

== Career ==
Following his graduation, Pagani worked for various companies as an engineer. His political career began in 1972 when he was elected as a councillor for the Italian Democratic Socialist Party (PSDI), a position he held until 1978. He was subsequently elected as the mayor of Novara and served in the post until 1981. Pagani was elected to the Italian Senate in 1983 and 1987. He became a member of the Italian Parliament and was appointed Minister of Post and Telecommunications in June 1992. He was in office until May 1994 and served in two successive cabinets: in the cabinet led by Giuliano Amato, and then in the cabinet led by Carlo Azeglio Ciampi.

In the local elections of June 1999 Pagani was elected the President of the Province of Novara as an independent candidate, serving in the post until 2004 when he was replaced by Sergio Vedovato. Pagani had, by this time, left the PSDI and joined Forza Italia (FI). He then worked as a consultant for various companies.

== Personal life and death ==
Pagani was married to Daniela Pagani and had a son. He died in Novara on 7 February 2014 following a heart attack. His funeral ceremony was held in the basilica of San Gaudenzio on 8 February.
