= Camillo Pasquali =

Italian politician (1909–1956)

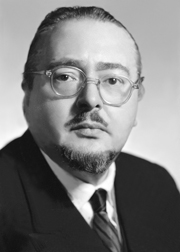
Camillo Pasquali in 1953

Camillo Pasquali (8 January 1909 – 27 February 1956) was an Italian politician who served as Mayor of Novara for two terms (1946–1947, 1949–1951) and as Senator from 1953 to 1956.
