= Veruno =

Village in Piemont, Italy

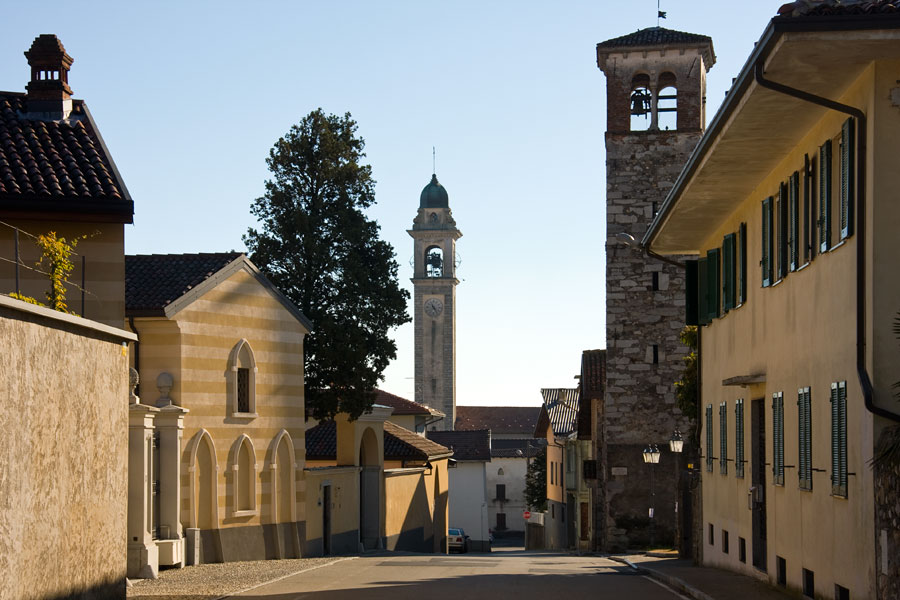
A view of Veruno.

Veruno is a frazione of the comune (municipality) of Gattico-Veruno in the Province of Novara in the Italian region Piedmont, located about 100 kilometres (62 mi) northeast of Turin and about 30 kilometres (19 mi) north of Novara. It was a separate comune until 1 January 2019; a regional law passed on 21 December 2018 merged the communities.

== See also ==
- List of national parks in the Alps
