= Alessandro Bermani =

Italian politician (1906–1979)

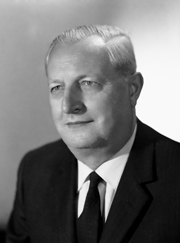
Alessandro Bermani

Alessandro Bermani (23 October 1906 – 12 January 1979) was an Italian politician who served as Mayor of Novara from 1956 to 1962 and as Senator for three legislatures (1963–1968, 1968–1972, 1972–1976).

He was the father of historian Cesare Bermani.
