= Gattico-Veruno =

- Comune
- Comune di Gattico-Veruno
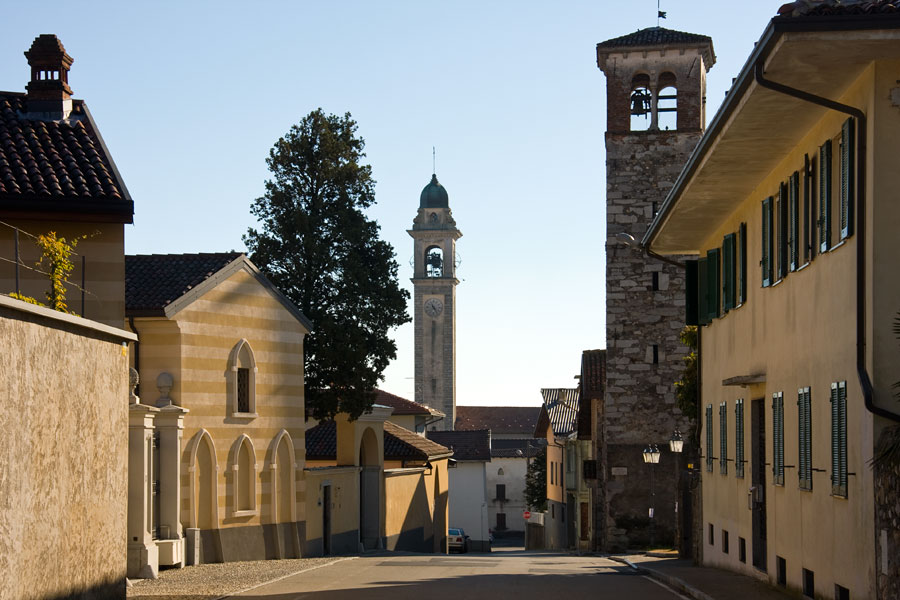
- View of Veruno

- Location within Italy Location within Piedmont
- Coordinates: 45°42′7.37″N 8°31′47.39″E
- Country: Italy
- Region: Piedmont
- Province: Novara (NO)
- Frazioni: Gattico (municipal seat), Maggiate Inferiore, Maggiate Superiore, Revislate, Veruno

Government
  - Mayor: Federico Casaccio

Area
  - Total: 26.16 km^{2} (10.10 sq mi)
- Elevation: 383 m (1,257 ft)

Population (31 December 2023)
  - Total: 5,250
  - Density: 201/km^{2} (520/sq mi)
- Demonym(s): Gatticesi and Verunesi
- Time zone: UTC+1 (CET)
  - Summer (DST): UTC+2 (CEST)
- Postal code: 28013
- Dialing code: 0322
- Website: Official website

Gattico-Veruno is a comune (municipality) in the province of Novara, Piedmont, northern Italy. It was created in late 2018 after the merger of Gattico and Veruno.
