= Gabriel Mascaró Febrer =

Spanish cyclist

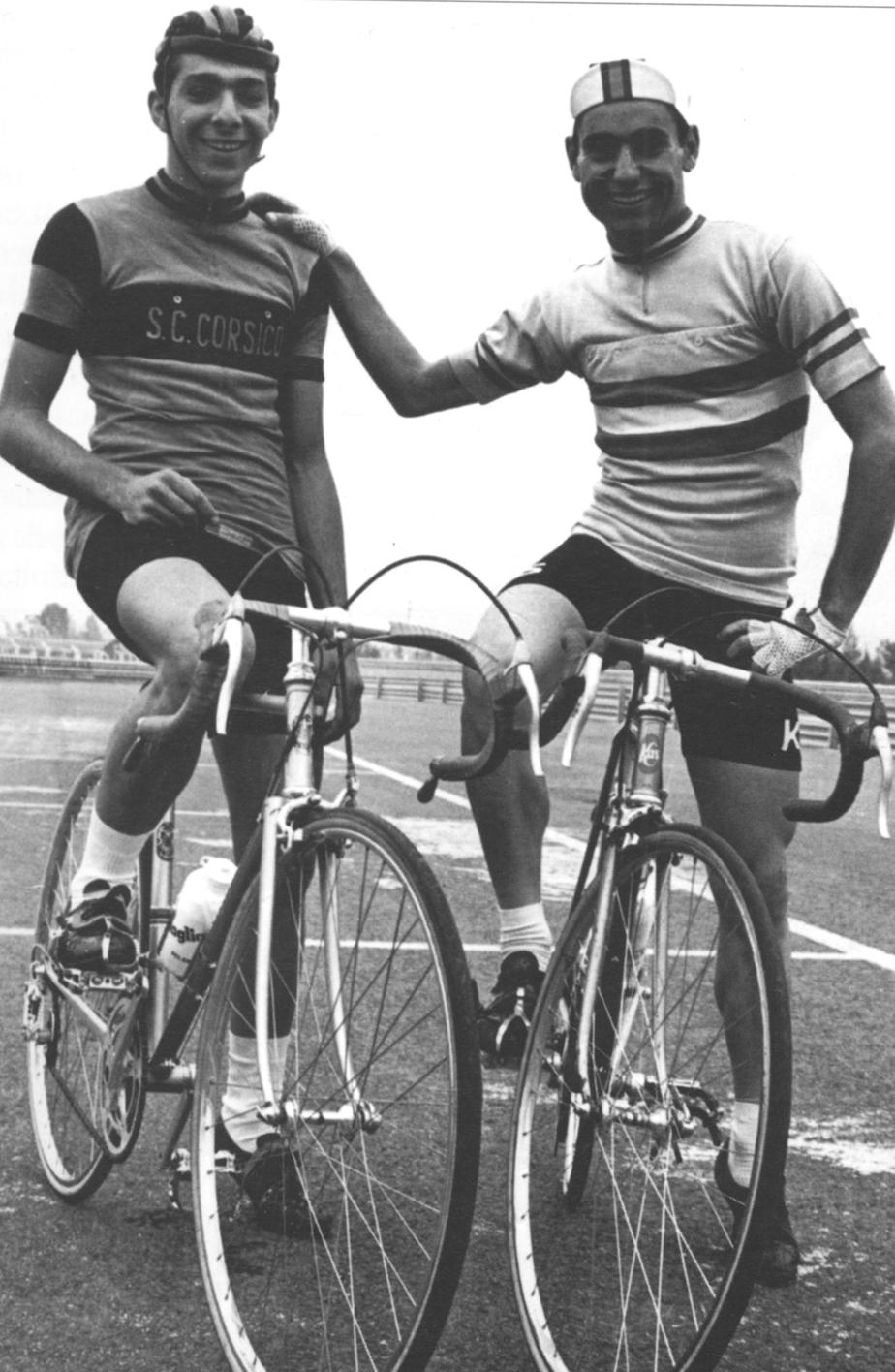
- Gabriel Mascaró Febrer (right) with Mario Giaccone (left), Mexico City, 1967

Personal information
- Born: 7 March 1944 (age 82) Vilafranca de Bonany, Spain

Cycling career
- Sport: Cycling
- Discipline: Road
- Role: Rider

Professional team
- 1968–1971: Kas–Kaskol

Gabriel Mascaró Febrer (born 7 March 1944) is a Spanish former racing cyclist. He rode in three editions of the Tour de France and two of the Vuelta a España.

== Major results ==
1964
3rd Overall Cinturón a Mallorca

1st Stage 2

1965
1st Stage 2 Cinturón a Mallorca
1968
3rd Clásica a los Puertos de Guadarrama
1969
1st Subida a Urkiola
3rd Overall Vuelta a la Comunidad Valenciana
7th Overall Volta a Catalunya
7th Overall Vuelta a Andalucía
1970
1st GP Cuprosan
1st Stage 2 Vuelta a Mallorca
2nd Prueba Villafranca de Ordizia
9th Overall Volta a Catalunya
1971
2nd Subida a Arrate
3rd Gran Premio Nuestra Señora de Oro

=== Grand Tour general classification results timeline ===
Grand Tour general classification results
Grand Tour	1969	1970	1971
Vuelta a España	—	DNF	DNF
Giro d'Italia	Did not Contest		
Tour de France	DNF	66	38

Legend
—	Did not compete
DNF	Did not finish
