= List of mayors of Novara =

Mayor of Novara
- Sindaco di Novara

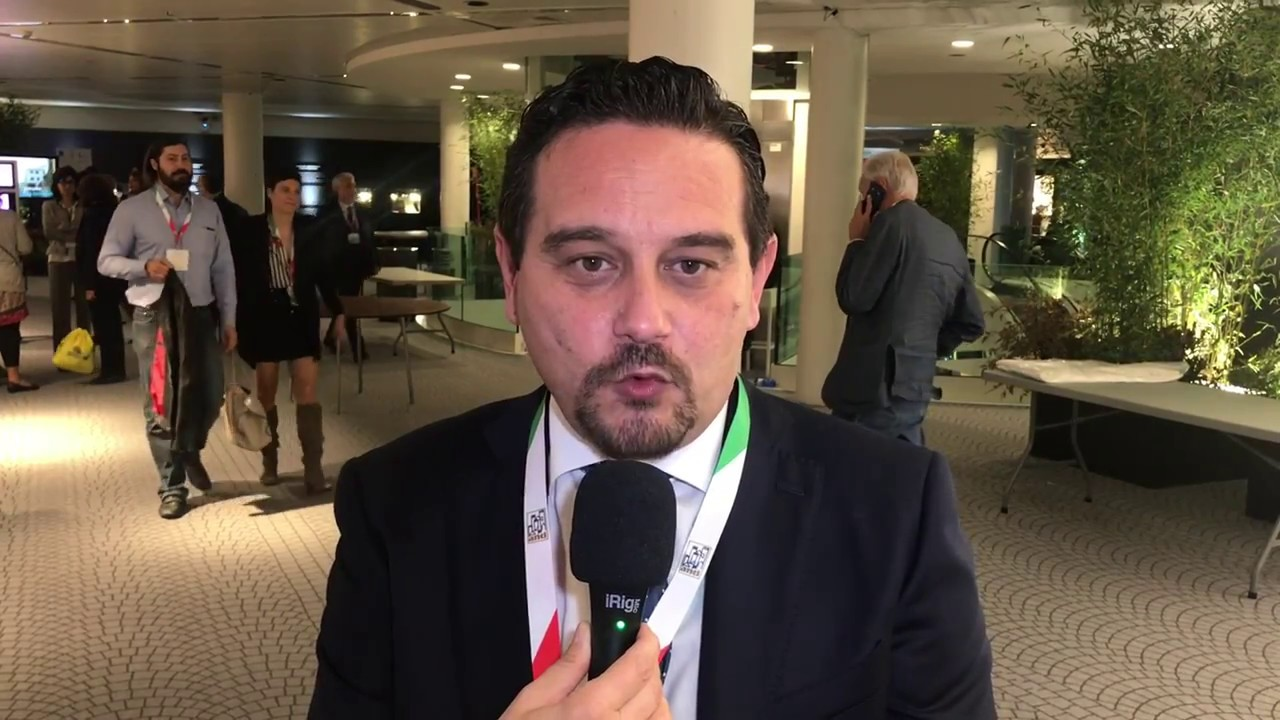
- Incumbent; Alessandro Canelli since 21 June 2016
- Appointer: Popular election
- Term length: 5 years, renewable once
- Formation: 1860
- Website: Official website

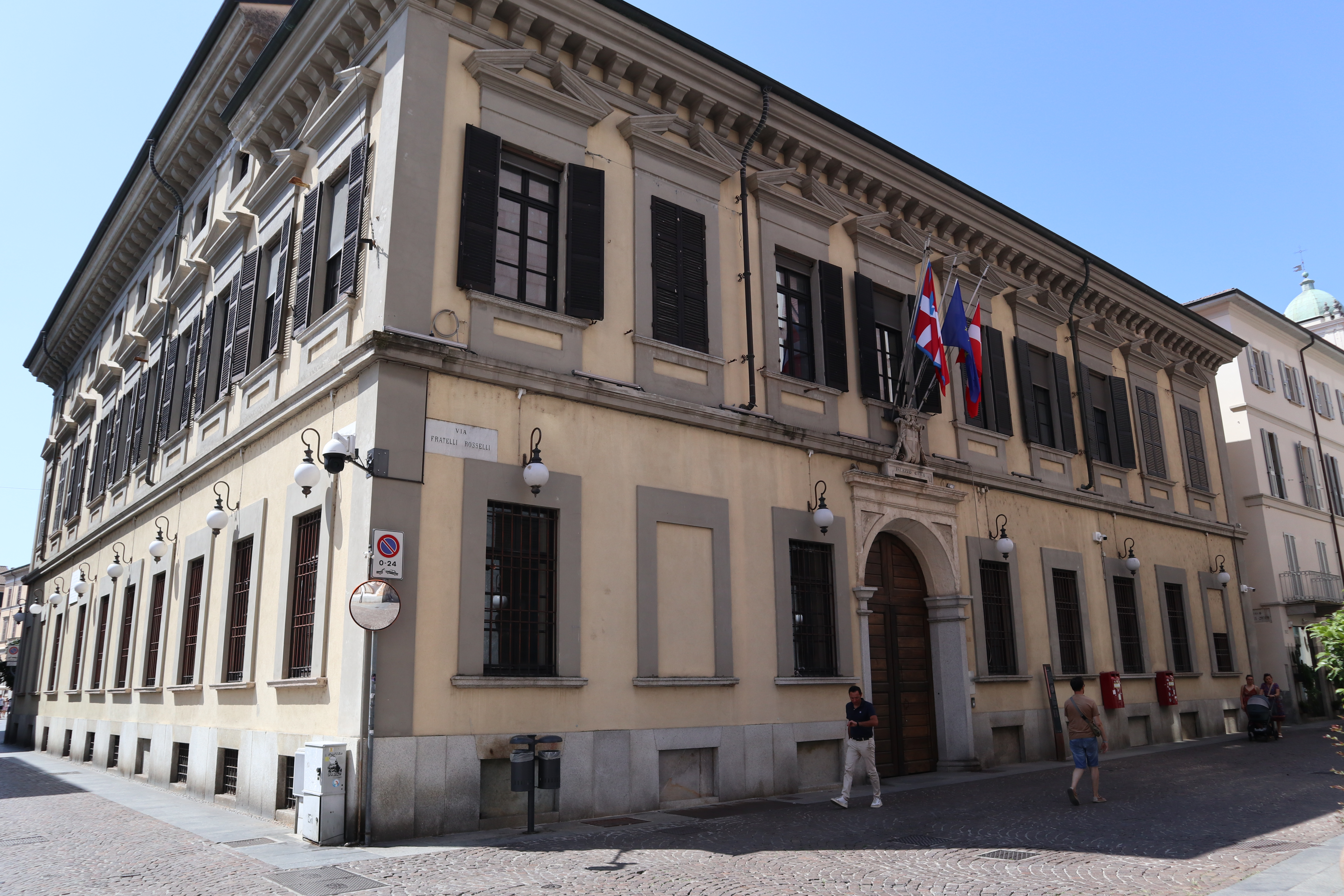
Novara's Town Hall.

The mayor of Novara is an elected politician who, along with the Novara City Council, is accountable for the strategic government of Novara in Piedmont, Italy.

The current mayor is Alessandro Canelli (Lega), who took office on 21 June 2016.

== Overview ==
According to the Italian Constitution, the mayor of Novara is member of the City Council.

The mayor is elected by the population of Novara, who also elect the members of the City Council, controlling the mayor's policy guidelines and able to enforce his resignation by a motion of no confidence. The mayor is entitled to appoint and release the members of his government.

Since 1993 the mayor is elected directly by Novara's electorate: in all mayoral elections in Italian cities with a population higher than 15,000 the voters express a direct choice for the mayor or an indirect choice voting for the party of the candidate's coalition. If no candidate receives at least 50% of votes, the top two candidates go to a second round after two weeks. The election of the City Council is based on a direct choice for the candidate with a preference vote: the candidate with the majority of the preferences is elected. The number of the seats for each party is determined proportionally.

== Italian Republic (since 1946) ==
=== City Council election (1946-1993) ===
From 1946 to 1993, the mayor of Novara was elected by the City Council.

	Mayor	Term start	Term end	Party
1	Camillo Pasquali	1946	1947	PSIUP
2	Ugo Porzio Giovanola	1947	1949	PSI
(1)	Camillo Pasquali	1949	1951	PSI
3	Giuseppe Giuliano Allegra	1952	1956	DC
4	Alessandro Bermani	1956	1962	PSI
5	Cornelio Masciadri	1962	1967	PSI
6	Rinaldo Canna	1967	1970	PSDI
7	Ezio Leonardi	1971	1978	DC
8	Maurizio Pagani	1978	1981	PSDI
9	Armando Riviera	1981	1991	PSI
10	Antonio Malerba	1991	1993	PSI

=== Direct election (since 1993) ===
Since 1993, under provisions of new local administration law, the mayor of Novara is chosen by direct election, originally every four, then every five years.

	Mayor	Term start	Term end	Party	Coalition	Election
11	Sergio Merusi	21 June 1993	12 May 1997	LN	LN	1993
12	Giovanni Correnti	12 May 1997	14 May 2001	PDS	PDS • PPI • SI • FdV	1997
13	Massimo Giordano	14 May 2001	6 June 2006	LN	FI • AN • LN • UDC	2001
13	Massimo Giordano	6 June 2006	26 May 2010 (Note: Resigned after being elected regional councillor. The deputy mayor Silvana Moscatelli (PdL) held the office till a new municipal election was held.)	LN	FI • AN • LN • UDC	2006
14	Andrea Ballarè	1 June 2011	21 June 2016	PD	PD • SEL	2011
15	Alessandro Canelli	21 June 2016	12 October 2021	LN; Lega	LN • FdI	2016
15	Alessandro Canelli	12 October 2021 (Note: Election originally scheduled for June 2021 then postponed due to the COVID-19 pandemic.)	Incumbent	LN; Lega	FI • FdI • Lega • UDC	2021
