= Alessandro Canelli =

Italian politician

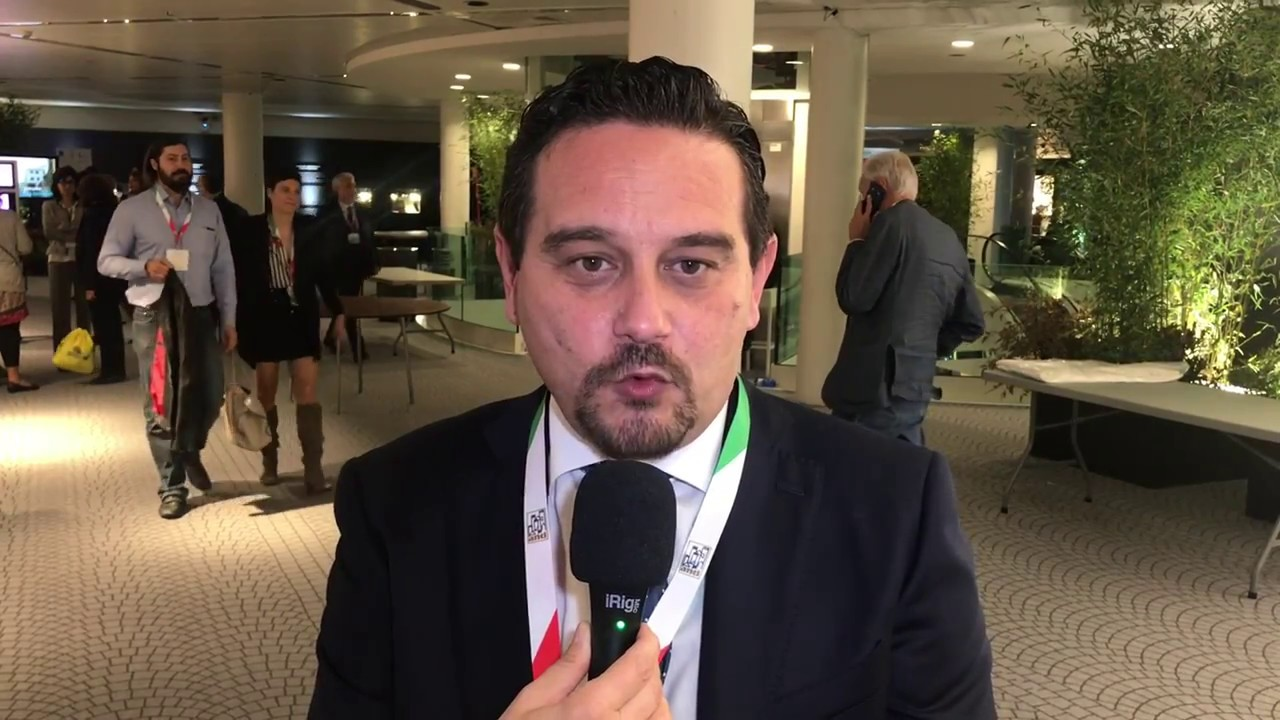
- Canelli in 2018

Mayor of Novara
- Incumbent
- Assumed office 21 June 2016
- Preceded by: Andrea Ballarè

Personal details
- Born: 9 June 1971 (age 55) Novara, Piedmont, Italy
- Party: Lega (political party)
- Education: Bocconi University
- Profession: administrator, entrepreneur

Alessandro Canelli (born 9 June 1971 in Novara) is an Italian politician.

He is a member of the right-wing populist party Lega Nord. Canelli was elected Mayor of Novara on 19 June 2016 and took office on 21 June.

== Biography ==
After earning his high school diploma in the science track from the “Alessandro Antonelli” High School in Novara, he graduated with a degree in Economics and Business Administration from Bocconi University in Milan, and subsequently earned a specialization in Public Administration Economics. He is a partner and director of Europol S.a.s. and head of corporate and commercial security services. Until 2014, he was a staff member in the Business Development Office of the Filarete Foundation in Milan.

== See also ==
- 2016 Italian local elections
- List of mayors of Novara

Political offices
Preceded by Andrea Ballarè	Mayor of Novara since 2016	Succeeded by
