= Bermani Ilir =

Bermani Ilir is a district (kecamatan) of Kepahiang Regency, Bengkulu, Indonesia.

== Subdistricts ==
- Keban Agung
- Air Raman
- Batu Belarik
- Bukit Menyan
- Cinta Mandi
- Cinta Mandi Baru
- Embong Ijuk
- Embong Sido
- Gunung Agung
- Kembang Seri
- Kota Agung
- Langgar Jaya
- Limbur Lama
- Muara Langkap
- Pagar Agung
- Sosokan Cinta Mandi
- Taba Baru
- Talang Pito
- Talang Sawah
