= Andrea Giaccone =

Italian politician (born 1976)

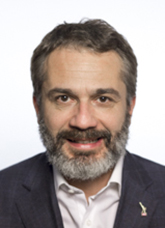
- Giaccone in 2018

Member of the Chamber of Deputies
- Incumbent
- Assumed office 23 March 2018
- Constituency: Piedmont 2 – 06 (2018–2022); Piedmont 2 – 02 (2022–present)

Personal details
- Born: 8 October 1976 (age 49)
- Party: Lega (since 2017)

Andrea Giaccone (born 8 October 1976) is an Italian politician serving as a member of the Chamber of Deputies since 2018. From 2018 to 2020, he served as chairman of the labor committee.
