= Gattico =

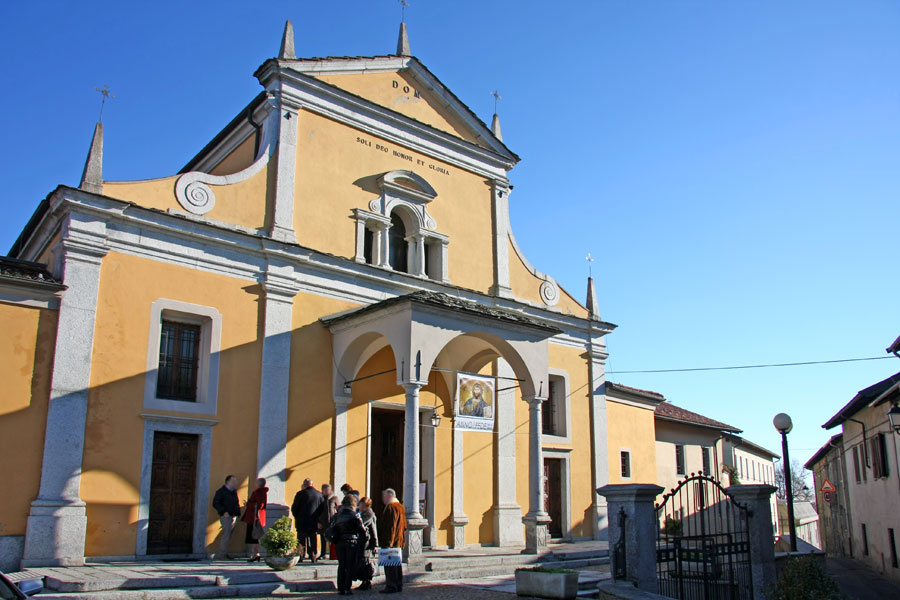

Gattico is a frazione of the comune (municipality) of Gattico-Veruno in the Province of Novara in the Italian region Piedmont, located about 100 kilometres (62 mi) northeast of Turin and about 30 kilometres (19 mi) north of Novara. It was a separate commune until 2018.

It is home to a Romanesque pieve (baptismal church) dating to the Middle Ages, the San Martino Church: the ruins are now well preserved in a wood. The pieve had some other medieval chapels, now in ruins but still interesting: Sant'Andrea chapel has three different concurrent building phases in the well-preserved apse.
