= Cesare Bermani =

Italian author and historian

Cesare Bermani (born Novara, 6 May 1937) is an Italian author and historian.

Son of the socialist politician Alessandro Bermani, he was one of the founders of the Ernesto de Martino Institute.

He now lives in Orta San Giulio, Piedmont.

== Select bibliography ==
- Il bambino e servito: Leggende metropolitane in Italia (Prisma, 1991)
- Spegni la luce che passa Pippo: Voci, leggende e miti della storia contemporanea (1996)
- Storia e mito della Volante rossa (I nostri/documenti) (1996)
- Al lavoro nella Germania di Hitler: Racconti e memorie dell'emigrazione italiana, 1937-1945 (Nuova cultura, 1998)
- Il nemico interno. Guerra civile e lotte di classe in Italia (1943-1976) (2003)
- Introduzione alla storia orale
- Giornali di classe. La scuola a Taranto dal fascismo al dopoguerra
- Una storia cantata. 1962-1997
- Giovanni Pirelli: un autentico rivoluzionario
- Pane, rose e libertà. Le canzoni che hanno fatto l'Italia: 150 anni di musica popolare, sociale e di protesta (Rizzoli, 2010)
- Volare al sabba. Una ricerca sulla stregoneria popolare
- Guerra guerra ai palazzi e alle chiese... Saggi sul canto sociale
- I dischi del sole: una storia della piu importante etichetta discografica
- La volante rossa. Storia e mito di «un gruppo di bravi ragazzi»
