= Ezio Leonardi =

Italian politician (1929–2025)

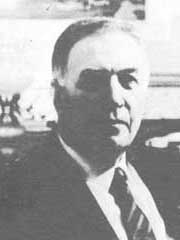
Ezio Leonardi

Ezio Leonardi (25 July 1929 – 1 May 2025) was an Italian politician who served as Mayor of Novara from 1971 to 1978 and as Senator for two legislatures (1987–1992, 1992–1994). He died on 1 May 2025, at the age of 95.

== Biography ==
A Piedmontese member of the Christian Democracy (Italy) party, he served as mayor of Novara from 1970 to 1978.

In 1990, he was elected to the Mezzomerico City Council.

Ezio Leonardi died in Novara on May 1, 2025, at the age of 95.
