= Armando Riviera =

Italian politician (born 1937)

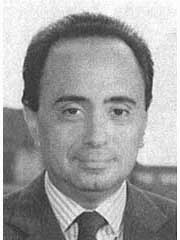
Armando Riviera

Armando Riviera (born 8 September 1937 in Novara) is an Italian politician who served as Mayor of Novara (1981–1991) and as Senator (1992–1994).
