= Politics of Lazio =

The politics of Lazio, a region of Italy, takes place in the framework of an "anomalous presidential" representative democracy or prime-ministerial system with an executive presidency, whereby the President of Regional Government is the head of government, and of a pluriform multi-party system. Executive power is exercised by the Regional Government. Legislative power is vested in both the government and the Regional Council.

Lazio is mainly a swing region. While Rome is more left-leaning, the rest of the region usually votes more for right-wing parties (FdI, LSP, FI).

== Executive branch ==
The Regional Government (Giunta Regionale) is presided by the President of the Region (Presidente della Regione), who is elected for a five-year term, and is composed by the president and the ministers (Assessori), who are currently 16, including a vice president.

=== List of presidents ===
Presidents elected by the Regional Council (1970–1995)

| N. | Name | Term of office | | Political party | Legislature |
|---|---|---|---|---|---|
| 1 | Girolamo Mechelli | 1 September 1970 | 17 January 1972 | Christian Democracy | I (1970) |
| 2 | Luigi Cipriani | 17 January 1972 | 23 October 1973 | Christian Democracy | I (1970) |
| 3 | Rinaldo Santini | 23 October 1973 | 22 September 1975 | Christian Democracy | I (1970) |
| 4 | Roberto Palleschi | 22 September 1975 | 23 March 1976 | Italian Socialist Party | II (1975) |
| 5 | Maurizio Ferrara | 23 March 1976 | 5 August 1977 | Italian Communist Party | II (1975) |
| 6 | Giulio Santarelli | 5 August 1977 | 8 August 1980 | Italian Socialist Party | II (1975) |
| 6 | Giulio Santarelli | 8 August 1980 | 24 March 1983 | Italian Socialist Party | III (1980) |
| 7 | Bruno Landi | 24 March 1983 | 18 April 1984 | Italian Socialist Party | III (1980) |
| 8 | Gabriele Panizzi | 18 April 1984 | 31 July 1985 | Italian Socialist Party | III (1980) |
| 9 | Sebastiano Montali | 31 July 1985 | 17 May 1987 | Italian Socialist Party | IV (1985) |
| (7) | Bruno Landi | 17 May 1987 | 27 July 1990 | Italian Socialist Party | IV (1985) |
| 10 | Rodolfo Gigli | 27 July 1990 | 5 August 1992 | Christian Democracy | V (1990) |
| 11 | Giorgio Pasetto | 5 August 1992 | 21 February 1994 | Christian Democracy | V (1990) |
| 12 | Carlo Proietti | 21 February 1994 | 18 January 1995 | Italian Socialist Party | V (1990) |
| 13 | Arturo Osio | 18 January 1995 | 19 May 1995 | Federation of the Greens | V (1990) |

Directly-elected presidents (since 1995)

| N. | Portrait | President | Term of office | | Tenure (Years and days) | Party | Composition | Legislature |
|---|---|---|---|---|---|---|---|---|
| 14 | | Piero Badaloni (1946– ) | 19 May 1995 | 12 May 2000 | 4 years, 359 days | Independent / The Democrats | The Olive Tree; PDS–PRC–PPI–FdV–PRI | VI (1995) |
| 15 | | Francesco Storace (1959– ) | 12 May 2000 | 2 May 2005 | 4 years, 355 days | National Alliance | House of Freedoms; AN–FI–CCD–CDU | VII (2000) |
| 16 | | Piero Marrazzo (1958– ) | 2 May 2005 | 27 October 2009 (Note: Resigned after a sex scandal. His deputy Esterino Montino (PD) held the office till a new regional election was called.) | 4 years, 178 days | Independent / Democratic Party | The Union; Ulivo/PD–PRC–FdV–PdCI–UDEUR–IdV | VIII (2005) |
| 17 | | Renata Polverini (1962– ) | 16 April 2010 | 12 March 2013 (Note: Resigned on 27 September 2012 after a corruption scandal. She remained in office as acting President till a new regional election was called.) | 2 years, 330 days | The People of Freedom | LP–PdL–UdC–LD | IX (2010) |
| 18 | | Nicola Zingaretti (1965– ) | 12 March 2013 | 19 March 2018 | 9 years, 243 days | Democratic Party | Italy. Common Good; PD–SEL–PSI–CD | X (2013) |
| 18 | | Nicola Zingaretti (1965– ) | 19 March 2018 | 10 November 2022 (Note: Resigned after being elected to the Chamber of Deputies. His deputy Daniele Leodori (PD) held the office till the following regional election.) | 9 years, 243 days | Democratic Party | PD–LeU–+Eu–CS–M5S (Note: Since 2021.) | XI (2018) |
| 19 | | Francesco Rocca (1965– ) | 2 March 2023 | Incumbent | 3 years, 185 days | Independent (close to FdI) | FdI–League–FI–UdC | XII (2023) |

== Legislative branch ==
The Regional Council of Lazio (Consiglio Regionale del Lazio) is composed of 51 members, of which 39 are elected in provincial constituencies with proportional representation, 10 from the so-called "regional list" of the elected president and the last one is for the candidate for president who comes second, who usually becomes the leader of the opposition in the council.

The council is elected for a five-year term, but, if the president suffers a vote of no confidence, resigns or dies, under the simul stabunt vel simul cadent clause (introduced in 1999), also the council will be dissolved and there will be a fresh election.

=== Current composition ===
The Regional Council of Lazio is currently composed of the following political groups:

| Party | Seats | Status |
|---|---|---|
| Brothers of Italy (FdI) | 22 / 51 | In government |
| Democratic Party (PD) | 11 / 51 | In opposition |
| Forza Italia (FI) | 7 / 51 | In government |
| Rocca for President | 2 / 51 | In government |
| Five Star Movement (M5S) | 2 / 51 | In opposition |
| Italia Viva (IV) | 2 / 51 | In opposition |
| League (Lega) | 1 / 51 | In government |
| Action (A) | 1 / 51 | In opposition |
| Greens and Left (VS) | 1 / 51 | In opposition |
| Progressive Pole (PP) | 1 / 51 | In opposition |
| Mixed Group | 1 / 51 | External support |

By coalition:

| Coalition | Seats | Status |
|---|---|---|
| Centre-right coalition | 33 / 51 | Government |
| Centre-left coalition | 16 / 51 | Opposition |
| Five Star Movement | 2 / 51 | Opposition |

== Local government ==
=== Provinces ===
| Province | Inhabitants | President | Party | Election |
|---|---|---|---|---|
| Metropolitan City of Rome Capital | 4,352,359 | Roberto Gualtieri (metropolitan mayor) | PD | 2021 |
| Frosinone | 489,716 | Luca Di Stefano | PD | 2022 |
| Latina | 575,218 | Federico Carnevale | FI | 2026 |
| Rieti | 156,148 | Roberta Cuneo | Lega | 2023 |
| Viterbo | 317,799 | Alessandro Romoli | FI | 2021 |

=== Municipalities ===
Provincial capitals

| Municipality | Inhabitants | Mayor | Party | Election |
|---|---|---|---|---|
| Frosinone | 46,649 | Riccardo Mastrangeli | Forza Italia | 2022 |
| Latina | 126,478 | Matilde Celentano | Brothers of Italy | 2023 |
| Rieti | 47,405 | Daniele Sinibaldi | Brothers of Italy | 2022 |
| Rome | 2,857,046 | Roberto Gualtieri | Democratic Party | 2021 |
| Viterbo | 67,831 | Chiara Frontini | Independent (centre-right) | 2022 |

== Parties and elections ==
=== Latest regional election ===
In the latest regional election, which took place on 12–13 February 2023, Francesco Rocca was elected President with the support of the centre-right coalition.

12–13 February 2023 Lazio regional election results
| Candidates | Votes | % | Seats | Parties | Votes | % | Seats |
|---|---|---|---|---|---|---|---|
| Francesco Rocca | 934,614 | 53.88 | 1 | | | | |
| Francesco Rocca | 934,614 | 53.88 | 1 | Brothers of Italy | 519,633 | 33.62 | 22 |
| Francesco Rocca | 934,614 | 53.88 | 1 | League | 131,631 | 8.52 | 3 |
| Francesco Rocca | 934,614 | 53.88 | 1 | Forza Italia | 130,368 | 8.43 | 3 |
| Francesco Rocca | 934,614 | 53.88 | 1 | Rocca List | 31,437 | 2.03 | 1 |
| Francesco Rocca | 934,614 | 53.88 | 1 | Union of the Centre | 24,983 | 1.62 | 1 |
| Francesco Rocca | 934,614 | 53.88 | 1 | Us Moderates | 17,398 | 1.13 | – |
| Francesco Rocca | 934,614 | 53.88 | 1 | Total | 855,450 | 55.34 | 30 |
| Alessio D'Amato | 581,033 | 33.50 | 1 | | | | |
| Alessio D'Amato | 581,033 | 33.50 | 1 | Democratic Party | 313,023 | 20.25 | 10 |
| Alessio D'Amato | 581,033 | 33.50 | 1 | Action – Italia Viva | 75,272 | 4.87 | 2 |
| Alessio D'Amato | 581,033 | 33.50 | 1 | D'Amato List | 47,184 | 3.05 | 1 |
| Alessio D'Amato | 581,033 | 33.50 | 1 | Greens and Left | 42,314 | 2.74 | 1 |
| Alessio D'Amato | 581,033 | 33.50 | 1 | Solidary Democracy | 18,417 | 1.19 | – |
| Alessio D'Amato | 581,033 | 33.50 | 1 | More Europe – Radicals – Volt | 14,870 | 0.96 | – |
| Alessio D'Amato | 581,033 | 33.50 | 1 | Italian Socialist Party | 7,974 | 0.52 | – |
| Alessio D'Amato | 581,033 | 33.50 | 1 | Total | 519,066 | 33.58 | 14 |
| Donatella Bianchi | 186,562 | 10.76 | – | Five Star Movement | 132,041 | 8.54 | 4 |
| Donatella Bianchi | 186,562 | 10.76 | – | Progressive Pole | 7,974 | 1.21 | 1 |
| Donatella Bianchi | 186,562 | 10.76 | – | Total | 150,768 | 9.75 | 5 |
| Sonia Pecorilli | 16,932 | 0.98 | – | Italian Communist Party | 10,212 | 0.66 | – |
| Rosa Rinaldi | 15,331 | 0.88 | – | People's Union | 10,289 | 0.67 | – |
| Blank and invalid votes | 45,111 | 2.53 | | | | | |
| Total candidates | 1,734,472 | 100.00 | 2 | Total parties | 1,545,785 | 100.00 | 49 |
| Registered voters/turnout | 4,791,612 | 37.20 | | | | | |
Source: Ministry of the Interior
