= List of presidents of Lazio =

This is the list of presidents of Lazio since 1970.

Presidents elected by the Regional Council (1970–1995)

N.	Name	Term of office		Political party	Legislature
1	Girolamo Mechelli	1 September 1970	17 January 1972	Christian Democracy	I (1970)
2	Luigi Cipriani	17 January 1972	23 October 1973	Christian Democracy	I (1970)
3	Rinaldo Santini	23 October 1973	22 September 1975	Christian Democracy	I (1970)
4	Roberto Palleschi	22 September 1975	23 March 1976	Italian Socialist Party	II (1975)
5	Maurizio Ferrara	23 March 1976	5 August 1977	Italian Communist Party	II (1975)
6	Giulio Santarelli	5 August 1977	8 August 1980	Italian Socialist Party	II (1975)
6	Giulio Santarelli	8 August 1980	24 March 1983	Italian Socialist Party	III (1980)
7	Bruno Landi	24 March 1983	18 April 1984	Italian Socialist Party	III (1980)
8	Gabriele Panizzi	18 April 1984	31 July 1985	Italian Socialist Party	III (1980)
9	Sebastiano Montali	31 July 1985	17 May 1987	Italian Socialist Party	IV (1985)
(7)	Bruno Landi	17 May 1987	27 July 1990	Italian Socialist Party	IV (1985)
10	Rodolfo Gigli	27 July 1990	5 August 1992	Christian Democracy	V (1990)
11	Giorgio Pasetto	5 August 1992	21 February 1994	Christian Democracy	V (1990)
12	Carlo Proietti	21 February 1994	18 January 1995	Italian Socialist Party	V (1990)
13	Arturo Osio	18 January 1995	19 May 1995	Federation of the Greens	V (1990)

Directly-elected presidents (since 1995)

N.	Portrait	President	Term of office		Tenure (Years and days)	Party	Composition	Legislature
14		Piero Badaloni (1946– )	19 May 1995	12 May 2000	4 years, 359 days	Independent / The Democrats	The Olive Tree; PDS–PRC–PPI–FdV–PRI	VI (1995)
15		Francesco Storace (1959– )	12 May 2000	2 May 2005	4 years, 355 days	National Alliance	House of Freedoms; AN–FI–CCD–CDU	VII (2000)
16		Piero Marrazzo (1958– )	2 May 2005	27 October 2009 (Note: Resigned after a sex scandal. His deputy Esterino Montino (PD) held the office till a new regional election was called.)	4 years, 178 days	Independent / Democratic Party	The Union; Ulivo/PD–PRC–FdV–PdCI–UDEUR–IdV	VIII (2005)
17		Renata Polverini (1962– )	16 April 2010	12 March 2013 (Note: Resigned on 27 September 2012 after a corruption scandal. She remained in office as acting President till a new regional election was called.)	2 years, 330 days	The People of Freedom	LP–PdL–UdC–LD	IX (2010)
18		Nicola Zingaretti (1965– )	12 March 2013	19 March 2018	9 years, 243 days	Democratic Party	Italy. Common Good; PD–SEL–PSI–CD	X (2013)
18		Nicola Zingaretti (1965– )	19 March 2018	10 November 2022 (Note: Resigned after being elected to the Chamber of Deputies. His deputy Daniele Leodori (PD) held the office till the following regional election.)	9 years, 243 days	Democratic Party	PD–LeU–+Eu–CS–M5S (Note: Since 2021.)	XI (2018)
19		Francesco Rocca (1965– )	2 March 2023	Incumbent	3 years, 221 days	Independent (close to FdI)	FdI–League–FI–UdC	XII (2023)
