= Elections in Lazio =

Italian regional elections

This page gathers the results of elections in Lazio.

== Regional elections ==
=== Latest regional election ===
In the latest regional election, which took place on 12–13 February 2023, Francesco Rocca was elected president with the support of the centre-right coalition.

12–13 February 2023 Lazio regional election results
| Candidates | Votes | % | Seats | Parties | Votes | % | Seats |
|---|---|---|---|---|---|---|---|
| Francesco Rocca | 934,614 | 53.88 | 1 | | | | |
| Francesco Rocca | 934,614 | 53.88 | 1 | Brothers of Italy | 519,633 | 33.62 | 22 |
| Francesco Rocca | 934,614 | 53.88 | 1 | League | 131,631 | 8.52 | 3 |
| Francesco Rocca | 934,614 | 53.88 | 1 | Forza Italia | 130,368 | 8.43 | 3 |
| Francesco Rocca | 934,614 | 53.88 | 1 | Rocca List | 31,437 | 2.03 | 1 |
| Francesco Rocca | 934,614 | 53.88 | 1 | Union of the Centre | 24,983 | 1.62 | 1 |
| Francesco Rocca | 934,614 | 53.88 | 1 | Us Moderates | 17,398 | 1.13 | – |
| Francesco Rocca | 934,614 | 53.88 | 1 | Total | 855,450 | 55.34 | 30 |
| Alessio D'Amato | 581,033 | 33.50 | 1 | | | | |
| Alessio D'Amato | 581,033 | 33.50 | 1 | Democratic Party | 313,023 | 20.25 | 10 |
| Alessio D'Amato | 581,033 | 33.50 | 1 | Action – Italia Viva | 75,272 | 4.87 | 2 |
| Alessio D'Amato | 581,033 | 33.50 | 1 | D'Amato List | 47,184 | 3.05 | 1 |
| Alessio D'Amato | 581,033 | 33.50 | 1 | Greens and Left | 42,314 | 2.74 | 1 |
| Alessio D'Amato | 581,033 | 33.50 | 1 | Solidary Democracy | 18,417 | 1.19 | – |
| Alessio D'Amato | 581,033 | 33.50 | 1 | More Europe – Radicals – Volt | 14,870 | 0.96 | – |
| Alessio D'Amato | 581,033 | 33.50 | 1 | Italian Socialist Party | 7,974 | 0.52 | – |
| Alessio D'Amato | 581,033 | 33.50 | 1 | Total | 519,066 | 33.58 | 14 |
| Donatella Bianchi | 186,562 | 10.76 | – | Five Star Movement | 132,041 | 8.54 | 4 |
| Donatella Bianchi | 186,562 | 10.76 | – | Progressive Pole | 7,974 | 1.21 | 1 |
| Donatella Bianchi | 186,562 | 10.76 | – | Total | 150,768 | 9.75 | 5 |
| Sonia Pecorilli | 16,932 | 0.98 | – | Italian Communist Party | 10,212 | 0.66 | – |
| Rosa Rinaldi | 15,331 | 0.88 | – | People's Union | 10,289 | 0.67 | – |
| Blank and invalid votes | 45,111 | 2.53 | | | | | |
| Total candidates | 1,734,472 | 100.00 | 2 | Total parties | 1,545,785 | 100.00 | 49 |
| Registered voters/turnout | 4,791,612 | 37.20 | | | | | |
Source: Ministry of the Interior

=== List of previous regional elections ===
- 1970 Lazio regional election
- 1975 Lazio regional election
- 1980 Lazio regional election
- 1985 Lazio regional election
- 1990 Lazio regional election
- 1995 Lazio regional election
- 2000 Lazio regional election
- 2005 Lazio regional election
- 2010 Lazio regional election
- 2013 Lazio regional election
- 2018 Lazio regional election
