= Chiara Colosimo =

Italian politician (born 1986)

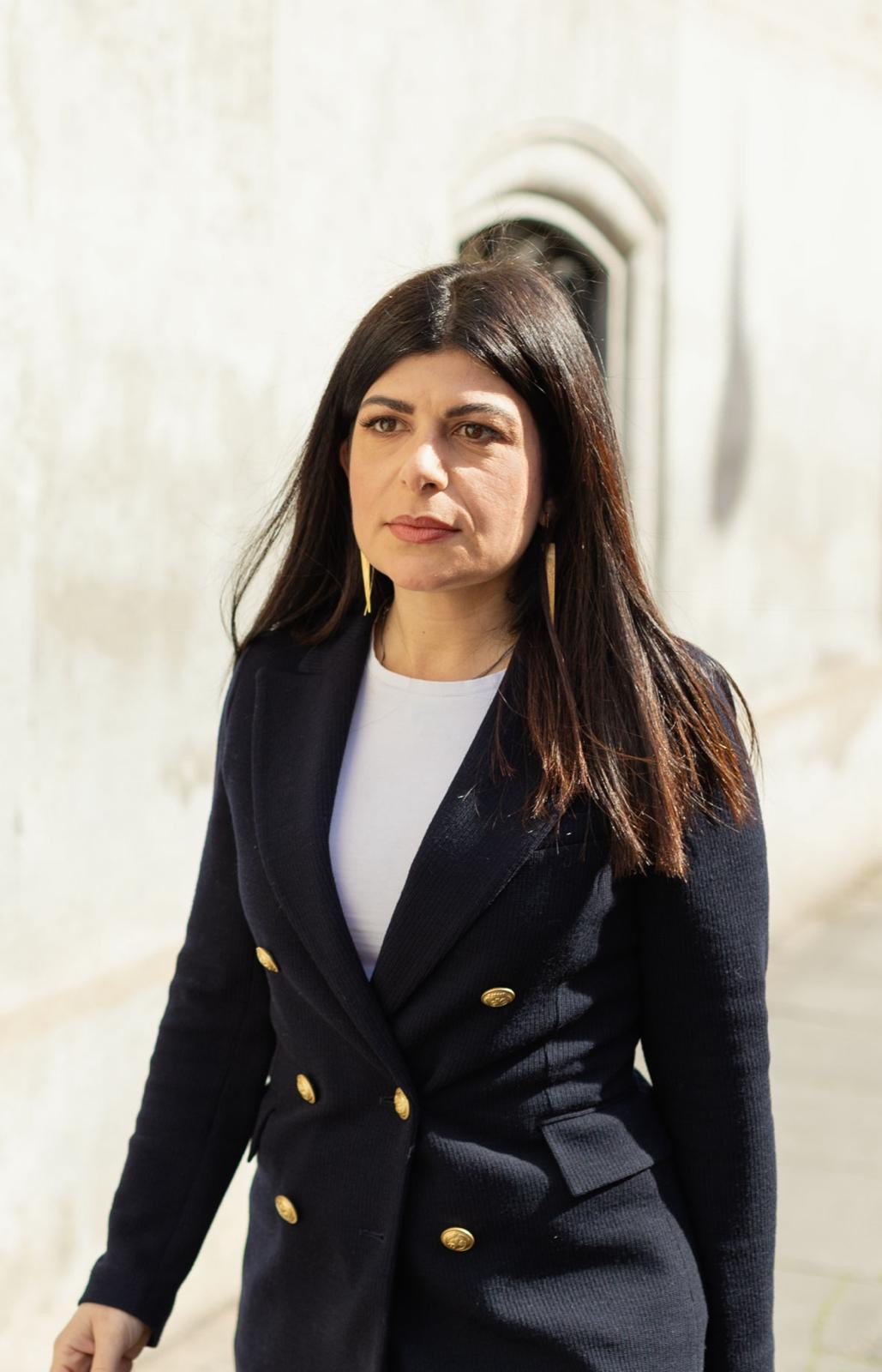
- Colosimo in 2024

President of the Antimafia Commission
- Incumbent
- Assumed office 23 May 2023
- Preceded by: Nicola Morra

Member of the Chamber of Deputies
- Incumbent
- Assumed office 13 October 2022
- Constituency: Lazio 2

Personal details
- Born: 2 June 1986 (age 40) Rome, Italy
- Party: Brothers of Italy (since 2012); PdL (2009-2012); AN (2004-2009)
- Education: Luiss University

Chiara Colosimo (born 2 June 1986) is an Italian politician who has been a member of the Chamber of Deputies for the Brothers of Italy party since 13 October 2022 and has been president of the Antimafia Commission since 23 May 2023.

== Early life and education ==
Colosuma was raised in Balduina neighborhood of Rome. Following her graduation from the Convitto Nazionale Vittorio Emanuele II in Rome with a high school diploma in classical studies, she pursued a degree in political science at LUISS Guido Carli in Rome, but did not complete her studies.

== Career ==
=== Early activism ===
Colosimo became active in politics during high school, becoming a representative on the Provincial Student Council in 2003, joining Student Action, a far-right student movement of the National Alliance (AN). She attended the Garbatella branch and becoming vice president of the Rome Council the following year. She contributed her political reference to Fabio Rampelli, the founder of the Gabbiani community movement of the Roman section of the former MSI in Colle Oppio and also a mentor to Giorgia Meloni.

=== Regional Councilor of Lazio ===
In 2009, Colosimo joined the merger of National Alliance (AN) into The People of Freedom (PdL), where she was appointed regional president for Lazio of Young Italy (GI), the PdL's youth wing. The following year, she stood as a candidate in the 2010 Lazio regional elections on the Per il Lazio list, supporting the centre-right presidential candidate Renata Polverini. She was elected to the Regional Council of Lazio and, in 2011, became president of the council's Mobility Commission.

In September 2012, Colosimo was involved in a controversy after reports surfaced that, during the 2010 election campaign, she had made statements in the former headquarters of the Italian Social Movement (MSI) in Garbatella, against the backdrop of a poster depicting Corneliu Zelea Codreanu, founder of the Romanian Iron Guard. In response, she publicly declared that she had “no difficulty in condemning, without ifs and buts, Nazism and Fascism.”

In December 2012, Colosimo, together with several leaders of Young Italy (GI), took part in the split from the PdL led by Giorgia Meloni, Ignazio La Russa, and Guido Crosetto, which resulted in the founding of Brothers of Italy (FdI). She immediately assumed a role as a national leader within the new party. In 2013, she stood as a candidate for the Chamber of Deputies in the Lazio 1 on the FdI list, and simultaneously ran in the Lazio regional elections in the Rome constituency, supporting Francesco Storace’s list. She was not elected in either contest, receiving 931 votes in the latter.

In the 2018 Lazio regional elections, Colosimo again ran with FdI, supporting Stefano Parisi’s motion, and was elected in the Rome constituency with 10,895 preferences. In the regional council, she served as president of the Transparency and Publicity Commission and vice president of the special commission on the COVID-19 pandemic emergency.

=== Member of Chamber of Deputies (2022 - present) ===
In the 2022 snap general election, Colosimo ran as a candidate for the Chamber of Deputies in the single-member constituency of Lazio 2–03 (Latina), representing Brothers of Italy (FdI) and supported by the centre-right coalition. She was elected with 54.51% of the vote, defeating centre-left candidate Tommaso Malandruccolo and Gianluca Bono of the Five Star Movement, who both received 19.58% and 15.64% respectively.

During the 19th legislature, Colosimo served as a member of the 12th Social Affairs Committee and as secretary of the Chamber's Bureau until her election as President of the Parliamentary Anti-Mafia Commission on 23 May 2023, receiving 29 out of 50 votes. Her election to the commission presidency drew criticism due to her personal relationship with former Nuclei Armati Rivoluzionari (NAR) member Luigi Ciavardini, who had been convicted for his role in the Bologna massacre. In protest, several relatives of victims of mafia and terrorist attacks, including Salvatore Borsellino, publicly opposed her appointment, and most opposition parties abstained from the vote. Colosimo stated that her acquaintance with Ciavardini was related to his activities as president of an association focused on the rehabilitation of former prisoners.

== Controversy ==
In 2025, Colosimo filed a defamation lawsuit against Saverio Lodato, a journalist who, during the TV program Otto e mezzo, alleged that she had close ties with Luigi Ciavardini, the terrorist responsible for the Bologna massacre. In November 2025, a Rai3 investigation for the show Report hosted by Sigfrido Ranucci discovered a photo of Colosimo along with the entertainment agent Pamela Perricciolo, posing next to a bust of Benito Mussolini in 2015 with the caption, "We are working with Grandpa Benito to create our relaxation corner."

== Electoral history ==
Regional Council of LazioChamber of Deputies
| Year | Constituency | Party/List | Votes | Result | Ref |
|---|---|---|---|---|---|
| 2010 | Rome | Per il Lazio | (Note: Elected via Listino) | Elected | |
| 2013 | Rome | Brothers of Italy | 931 | Not elected | |
| 2018 | Rome | Brothers of Italy | 10,895 | Elected | |
| Year | Constituency | Party | Votes | Result | Ref |
| 2013 | Lazio 1 | Brothers of Italy | 62,588 | Not elected | |

2022 Italian general election — Lazio 2-03 (Latina)
| Party | Candidate | Votes | % |
|---|---|---|---|
| Brothers of Italy | Chiara Colosimo | 88,987 | 54.51% |
| Democratic Party | Tommaso Malandruccolo | 31,966 | 19.58% |
| Five Star Movement | Gianluca Bono | 25,535 | 15.64% |
| Total votes | | 163,269 | 100.00% |
