= Nicola Zingaretti =

Italian politician

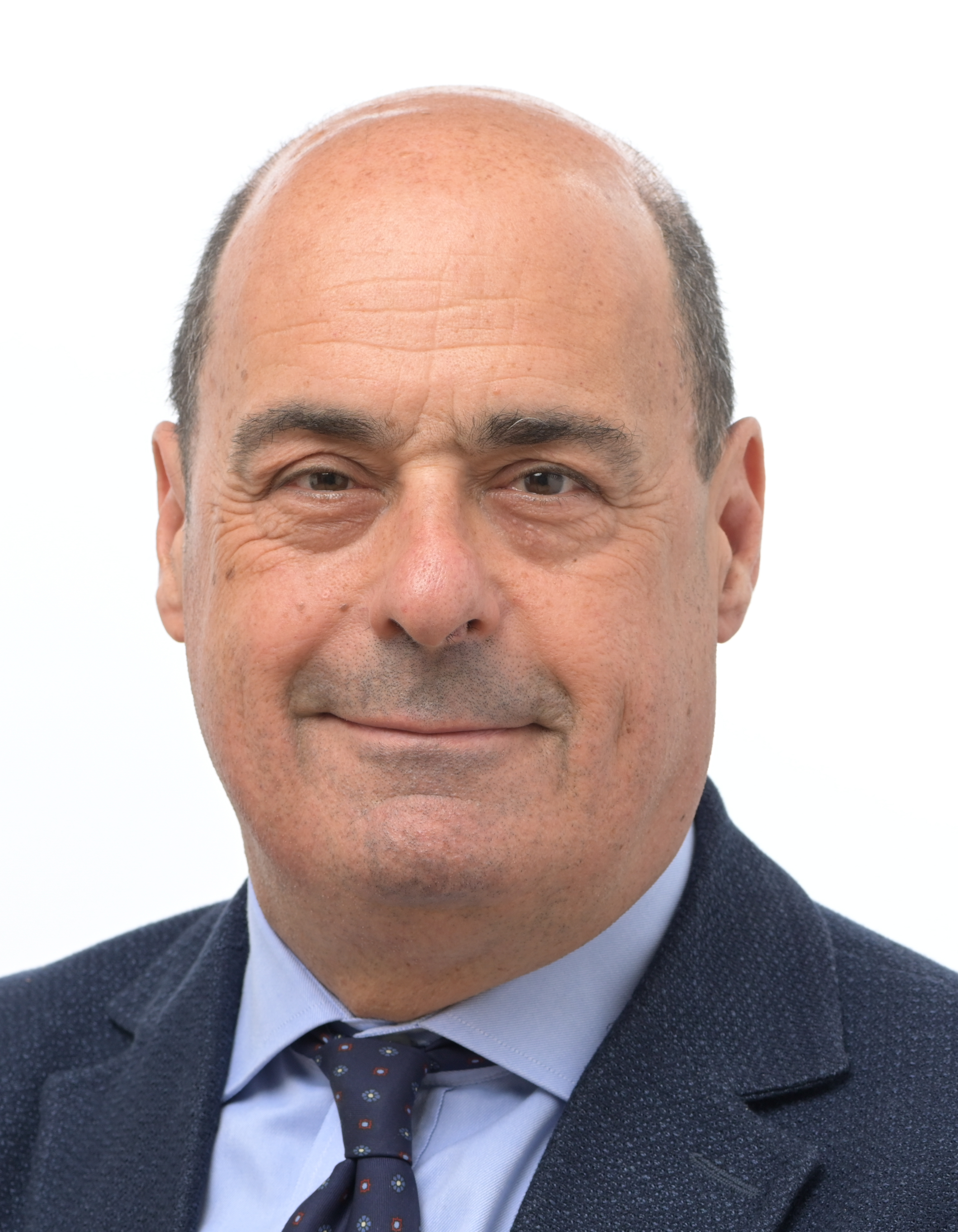

Member of the European Parliament
- Incumbent
- Assumed office 16 July 2024
- In office 20 July 2004 – 16 June 2008
- Constituency: Central Italy

President of Lazio
- In office 12 March 2013 – 10 November 2022
- Preceded by: Renata Polverini
- Succeeded by: Francesco Rocca

Secretary of the Democratic Party
- In office 17 March 2019 – 14 March 2021
- Deputy: Andrea Orlando; Paola De Micheli (2019)
- Preceded by: Maurizio Martina
- Succeeded by: Enrico Letta

President of the Province of Rome
- In office 28 April 2008 – 29 December 2012
- Preceded by: Enrico Gasbarra
- Succeeded by: Umberto Postiglione (Prefectural Commissioner)

Member of the Chamber of Deputies
- In office 13 October 2022 – 9 July 2024
- Succeeded by: Patrizia Prestipino
- Constituency: Lazio

Personal details
- Born: 11 October 1965 (age 60) Rome, Italy
- Party: PCI (before 1991); PDS (1991–1998); DS (1998–2007); PD (2007–present)
- Spouse: Cristina Berliri
- Children: 2 daughters
- Relatives: Luca Zingaretti (brother)
- Website: Official website

Nicola Zingaretti (Italian pronunciation: [niˈkɔːla ddziŋɡaˈretti]; born 11 October 1965) is an Italian politician who served as President of Lazio from March 2013 to November 2022 and was Secretary of the Democratic Party from March 2019 until March 2021.

During the 1990s, he was a prominent European youth leader, serving as National Secretary of the Left Youth, the youth-wing of the Democratic Party of the Left and as President of the International Union of Socialist Youth. In 2004, Zingaretti became a Member of the European Parliament for the centre-left coalition The Olive Tree. From 2008 to 2012, he served as President of the Province of Rome.

Zingaretti is considered a social democrat and one of the most prominent members of the party's left-wing. Moreover, he is the longest-serving President of Lazio as well as the first one to be re-elected after a first five-year term.

He is the brother of the actor Luca Zingaretti, who plays Salvo Montalbano in the Inspector Montalbano television series.

== Early life ==
Nicola Zingaretti was born in Rome in 1965, where he grew up in a middle-class family. Zingaretti's mother is an Italian Jew, who on 16 October 1943 managed to escape from the Nazis with her mother, while her grandmother Ester Della Torre was deported to Auschwitz concentration camp, where she died after a few days. He has one sister, Angela, and an older brother, Luca, who has become a well-known actor, famous for playing Salvo Montalbano in the Inspector Montalbano mystery series.

While attending a professional school for dental technicians, Zingaretti started his commitment to associations taking part in the peace movements. Moreover, at 17 years old he was one of the founders of the anti-racist association "Black and not only" (Nero e non-solo), whose main aims were to promote liberal immigration politics and to create a multicultural and multiethnic society. He obtained a certificate as a dental technician in 1984. He then attended the faculty of Letters at the Sapienza University of Rome, but passed only three exams and never graduated. During these years he met his future wife Cristina, with whom he has two daughters.

== Political career ==
=== Youth leader ===
Zingaretti started his political career within the ranks of the Italian Communist Party (PCI), where, between 1985 and 1989, he was the City Secretary for Rome. In the same years he also served as member of the National Board of Italian Communist Youth Federation (FGCI). Zingaretti later became a member of PCI's heir, the Democratic Party of the Left (PDS). In 1991 he was elected National Secretary of Left Youth (Sinistra Giovanile), the youth wing of the PDS. In the following year he was elected to the Rome City Council. During these years, he became a strong advocate of sustainable development and environmental protection; he also promoted many events against the Mafia and organized both the first "Antimafia Youth Camp" in San Vito Lo Capo and numerous initiatives in memory of Giovanni Falcone and Paolo Borsellino, the two anti-mafia magistrates who were assassinated in 1992.

From 1995 to 1997, he was President of the International Union of Socialist Youth and Vice President of the Socialist International. In these years, he was committed in rebuilding links with the social democratic parties and other democratic and progressive youth organizations in Bosnia and Herzegovina. Following the signing of the Dayton Agreement in 1996, he spoke to the UN General Assembly for the World Youth Year, as a Representative on the UN Committee.

In 1998, at thirty-three years old Zingaretti joined the Commission to draw up the socialist political platform for the new century, "Global Progress", chaired by Felipe González and composed, among others, by Martine Aubry, Shimon Peres and Ricardo Lagos. He was also committed in promoting the peace process between Israel and Palestine, organizing many initiatives to support dialogue between young wings of the Israeli Labor Party and Fatah.

From 1998 to 2000, he served as international relations spokesman for the Democrats of the Left (DS), the heirs of the PDS, and in 1998 he organized the Congress of European Socialists, in Milan. In 1999 he took part in the Democrats of the Left delegation, along with Secretary Walter Veltroni, which visited Burma in support of the National League for Democracy and met the Nobel Peace Prize for 1991 Aung San Suu Kyi. In the same year, he organized the journey of the Dalai Lama in Rome.

In 2000, Zingaretti was elected Provincial Secretary of Democrats of the Left for Rome. In the following year he was one of the main promoters of Walter Veltroni's candidacy for Mayor of Rome, contributing to his victory. Zingaretti was among the protagonists of a season of important results for the centre-left and for the Democrats of the Left: in 2003, after eight years, the DS became again the largest party in the capital city, defeating the centre-right in the whole province of Rome.

=== Member of the European Parliament ===
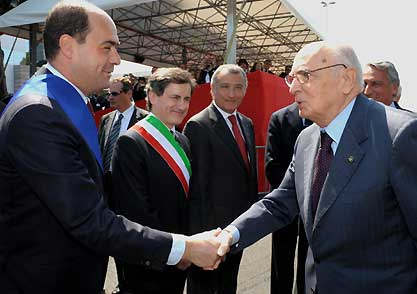
Zingaretti with Mayor Gianni Alemanno, Governor Piero Marrazzo and President Giorgio Napolitano in 2008

In March 2004, Zingaretti run in the European election for the list United in the Olive Tree. He gained more than 213,000 preferences and was elected Member of the European Parliament. During the first meeting of the Italian delegation he was appointed President. He was also a member of the Committee on Development and Committee on International Trade. He also took part in the interparliamentary delegations for relations with the Korean Peninsula, Israel and in the parliamentary intergroup "Volunteering", "Disability", "LGBT rights" and "Tibet".

From 2005 to 2007, he was rapporteur for the European Parliament on the directive IPRED2 about criminal sanctions for the protection of intellectual property rights and succeeded in pushing through a bill which uniformed the criminal sanctions in all EU Member States. The directive opposes criminal penalties for counterfeiters who import illegal and dangerous goods from countries outside the EU. The approval of the directive had a recognition by the International Herald Tribune and an MEP Award nomination, a prestigious honor that is given annually to the most deserving MEPs.

On 18 November 2006, Zingaretti was elected Regional Secretary of the DS for Lazio. On 14 October 2007 was elected Regional Secretary of the new-formed Democratic Party with 282,000 votes (85.31%). On 16 June 2008, he resigned as MEP to assume the office of President of the Province of Rome.

=== President of the Province of Rome ===
On 28 April 2008, Zingaretti was elected President of the Province of Rome winning 51.48% of the vote.

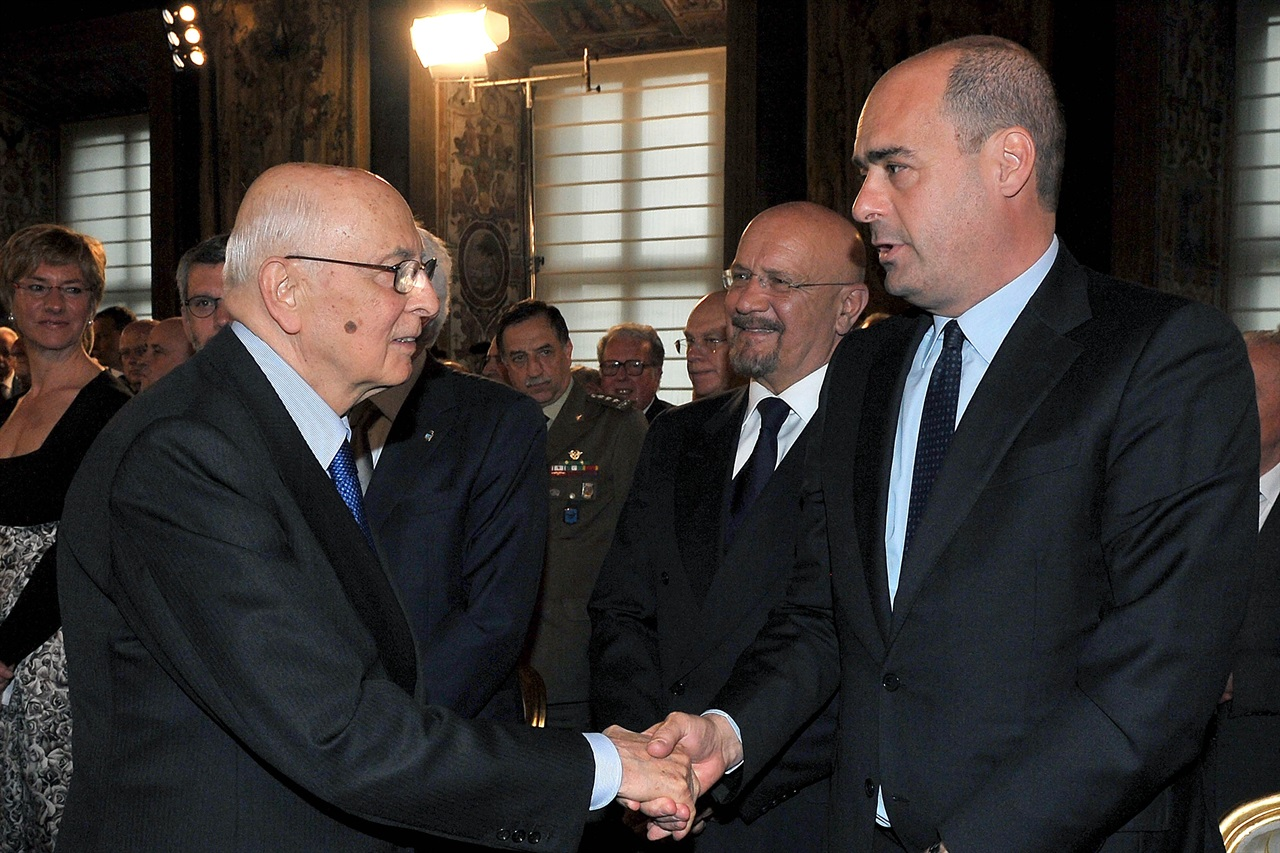
Zingaretti with President Napolitano in 2012

In 2010, Zingaretti refused to run as centre-left candidate in regional election and for this was heavily criticized by some members of his party, like the Mayor of Florence, Matteo Renzi. Few months later during the celebration of the 65th anniversary of the Liberation Day on 25 April 2010, Zingaretti participated together with the new president of Lazio Renata Polverini at an event organized in Rome at Porta San Paolo. However, objects, slogans and insults were thrown toward the stage, contesting Polverini and her political background in the right-wing and Zingaretti was hit in the face by a lemon. After a few minutes, Zingaretti and Polverini were forced to abandon the event.

Zingaretti's administration promoted the "ProvinciaWiFi" project, which consisted in the installation in squares, libraries and meeting places of the provincial territory, WiFi devices for free access to the Internet. In 2011, he inaugurated Porta Futuro, a center for orientation, training and work. Born in the wake of "Port 22" of Barcelona, the new structure, located in the district of Testaccio in Rome, managed the empowerment of citizens and businesses of the province of Rome. His administration also promoted a law which legalized the condom distributors in schools of Rome; these bill created lot criticisms from the Catholic Church.

On 28 June 2012 at Casina Valadier in Rome, he announced his intention to run in the upcoming municipal election in Rome, to challenge the rightist outgoing mayor Gianni Alemanno; this statement immediately found the opposition of many members of his own party. The official candidacy took place on 16 July during an event in Piazza San Cosimato in Trastevere district, during which he announced his candidacy as Mayor of Rome. However, on 24 September 2012, governor Renata Polverini, resigned after a controversy regarding the personal use of public money at the hand of some members of the coalition that supported her, so on 4 October, Zingaretti retired his candidacy as Mayor, announcing his will to run as President of Lazio. On 7 December 2012, Zingaretti resigned as President of the Province of Rome, putting an end to his administration 5 months before the natural deadline, to run in the 2013 regional election. The Prefectural Commissioner Umberto Postiglione replaced him in his office.

=== President of Lazio ===
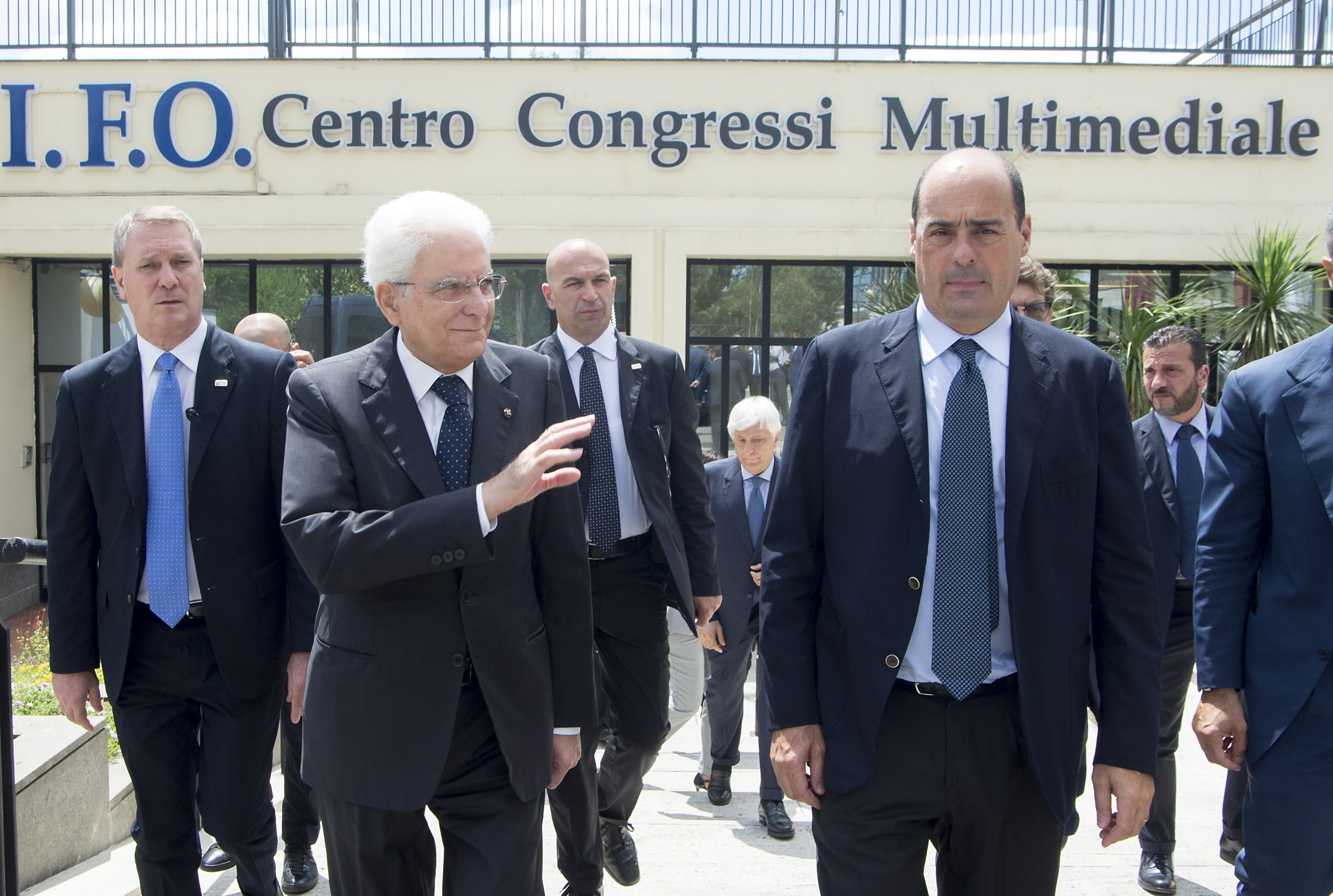
Zingaretti with President Sergio Mattarella in Rome, 2017

In the February 2013 election he ran against the centre-right candidate Francesco Storace, leader of the national conservative party The Right and supported by Silvio Berlusconi, the Five Star Movement's Davide Barillari and the notable lawyer, Giulia Bongiorno, who was the candidate of the centrist Civic Choice. Zingaretti won the election, gaining 1,329,643 votes (40.7%), against 29.3% of Storace, 20.2% of Barillari and 4.7% of Bongiorno. The centre-left coalition gained 28 seats out of 51, winning a solid parliamentary majority.

Under his presidency, the Regional Council approved a reform concerning live entertainments and cultural promotion, established the "Cancer Registry" of the Lazio Region and established a regional fund in favor of people concerned by over-indebtedness or usury. He also promoted a new legislation on historic houses and natural parks and the regional law concerning the cultivation of cannabis for commercial, food and environmental purposes. The Council approved a new legislation on the so-called "ecomuseum", passed the bill for the establishment of regional civil service and approved the new law for urban regeneration and building recovery.

On 4 March 2018, Zingaretti was narrowly re-elected president with 1,018,736 votes (32.9%), defeating the centre-right candidate Stefano Parisi (31.2%) and the Five Star's Roberta Lombardi (27%). Despite the small margin of victory, Zingaretti's win was seen as a strong showing due to the poor electoral result of the centre-left coalition in the general election which was held on the same day. After the election defeat, the Democratic leader, Matteo Renzi, resigned from secretary, his deputy Maurizio Martina started functioning as acting secretary and a new leadership election was called for early 2019. On 7 July 2018, Nicola Zingaretti announced his intention to run as new party's leader.

In August 2018, Zingaretti launched a political convention in support of his candidacy, named Piazza Grande ("Great Square"), which was held in Rome in October.

Zingaretti's campaign was based on a social democratic platform, whose aim was to abandon the social liberal and centrist policies promoted by Matteo Renzi and to move the Democratic Party more on the left. The campaign's main themes were social justice and fight to economic inequality.

In September 2018, the Regional Council of Lazio approved a law containing urgent vaccine prevention measures that reintroduced the mandatory vaccination, keeping the number of mandatory vaccines to 12 and not allowing those who have not been vaccinated to attend school. This law was introduced by the government of Paolo Gentiloni in early 2017 and treated to be abolish by Giulia Grillo, the new Minister of Health.

On 1 December 2018, Zingaretti faced a motion of no confidence proposed by the centre-right coalition, which was rejected with votes 26 against and 22 in favor, with one no-vote from a Forza Italia member and three absents.

=== Secretary of the Democratic Party ===
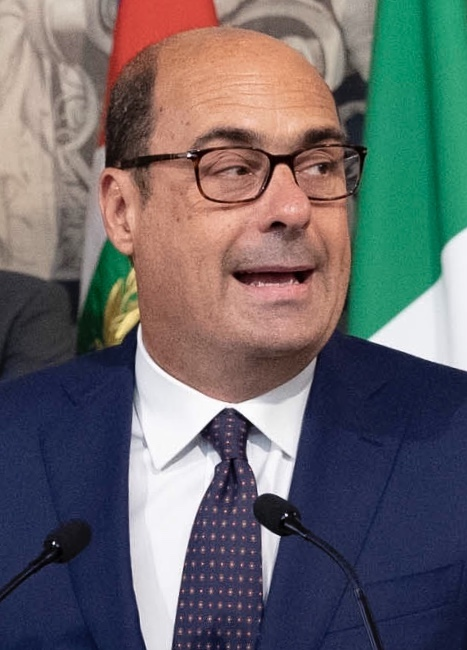
Nicola Zingaretti in 2019

On 3 March 2019, Zingaretti won the Democratic leadership election by a landslide, receiving 66% of the over 1.5 million votes cast and defeating Maurizio Martina and Roberto Giachetti. During his victory speech Zingaretti dedicated his victory to Greta Thunberg, a young Swedish activist against global warming and climate change. He was officially appointed by the National Assembly on 17 March 2019. On the same day, former Prime Minister Paolo Gentiloni was elected the party's new president. After a month, on 17 April, Zingaretti appointed Andrea Orlando and Paola De Micheli as his deputy secretaries.

In the run-up to the 2019 European Parliament election Zingaretti presented a special logo including a large reference to "We Are Europeans", a political manifesto promoted by former minister Carlo Calenda, and the symbol of the PES. Additionally, he forged an alliance with Article One, the party founded in 2017 by splinters from the PD. In the election, the PD gained 22.7% of votes, arriving second after the League.

In August 2019, tensions grew within the populist majority, due to Matteo Salvini's motion of no-confidence on Prime Minister Giuseppe Conte. On 20 August, Conte resigned his post to President Mattarella and on the following day, the national direction of the PD officially opened to a cabinet with the Five Star Movement (M5S), based on pro-Europeanism, green economy, sustainable development, fight against economic inequality and a new immigration policy. On 28 August, Zingaretti announced at the Quirinal Palace his favorable position on keeping Giuseppe Conte at the head of the new government, and on same day, Mattarella summoned Conte to the Quirinal Palace for the 29 August to give him the task of forming a new cabinet. The Conte II Cabinet took office on 5 September.

On 18 September, Renzi, who had been one of the earliest supporters of a M5S–PD pact in August, left the PD and established a new centrist party named Italia Viva (IV). 24 deputies and 13 senators (including Renzi) left. However, not all supporters of Renzi followed him in the split: while the Always Forward and Back to the Future factions mostly followed him, most members of Reformist Base remained in the party. Other MPs and one MEP joined IV afterwards.

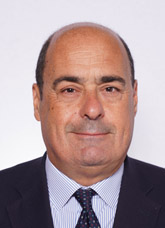
Nicola Zingaretti in 2022

From 15 to 17 November, the party held a three-days convention in Bologna, named Tutta un'altra storia ("A whole different story"), with the aim of presenting party's proposals for the 2020s decade. The convention was characterized by a strong leftward move, stressing a strong distance from liberal and centrist policies promoted under Renzi's leadership. Some newspapers, like La Stampa, compared Zingaretti's new policies to the ones of Jeremy Corbyn and Bernie Sanders. On 17 November, the last day of the convention, the National Assembly of the PD approved the new party's statute, which provided among others, the separation between party's secretary and candidate for premiership. On 7 March 2020, he announced he had tested positive for SARS-CoV-2.

On 4 March 2021, after weeks of political infighting within the party, Zingaretti announced his intention to resign as party secretary.

== Political views ==
Zingaretti is widely considered a social democratic and progressive politician. He is a strong supporter of European federalism, but he had often criticized austerity measures adopted by European leaders during the Great Recession. Zingaretti favours the recognition of marriages for same-sex couples and stepchild adoptions, a situation which occurs when at least one parent has children, from a previous relationship, that are not genetically related to the other parent. He also supports advance healthcare directive and legalization of cannabis.

During his career, Zingaretti was a strong advocate in the fight against economic inequality. For his leftist ideas, some journalists and political analysts compared him to Jeremy Corbyn and Bernie Sanders. Moreover, he is a supporter of sustainable development and green policies, as well as of a more effective fight against global warming.

== Health ==
On 7 March 2020, amid the COVID-19 pandemic in Italy, Zingaretti tested positive for COVID-19 and was isolated along with his family. On 30 March, he announced he had fully recovered.

== Electoral history ==
Election	House	Constituency	Party	Votes	Result
2004	European Parliament	Central Italy	Ulivo	218,130	Elected
2022	Chamber of Deputies	Lazio	PD	– (Note: Elected in a closed list proportional representation system.)	Elected
2024	European Parliament	Central Italy	PD	130,916	Elected

== Authored books ==
- Piazza Grande. Rome: Feltrinelli. 2019. ISBN 978-88-07-17366-0.

Party political offices
Preceded by Maurizio Martina	Secretary of the Democratic Party; 2019–2021	Succeeded by Enrico Letta
