= Roberta Angelilli =

Italian politician (born 1965)

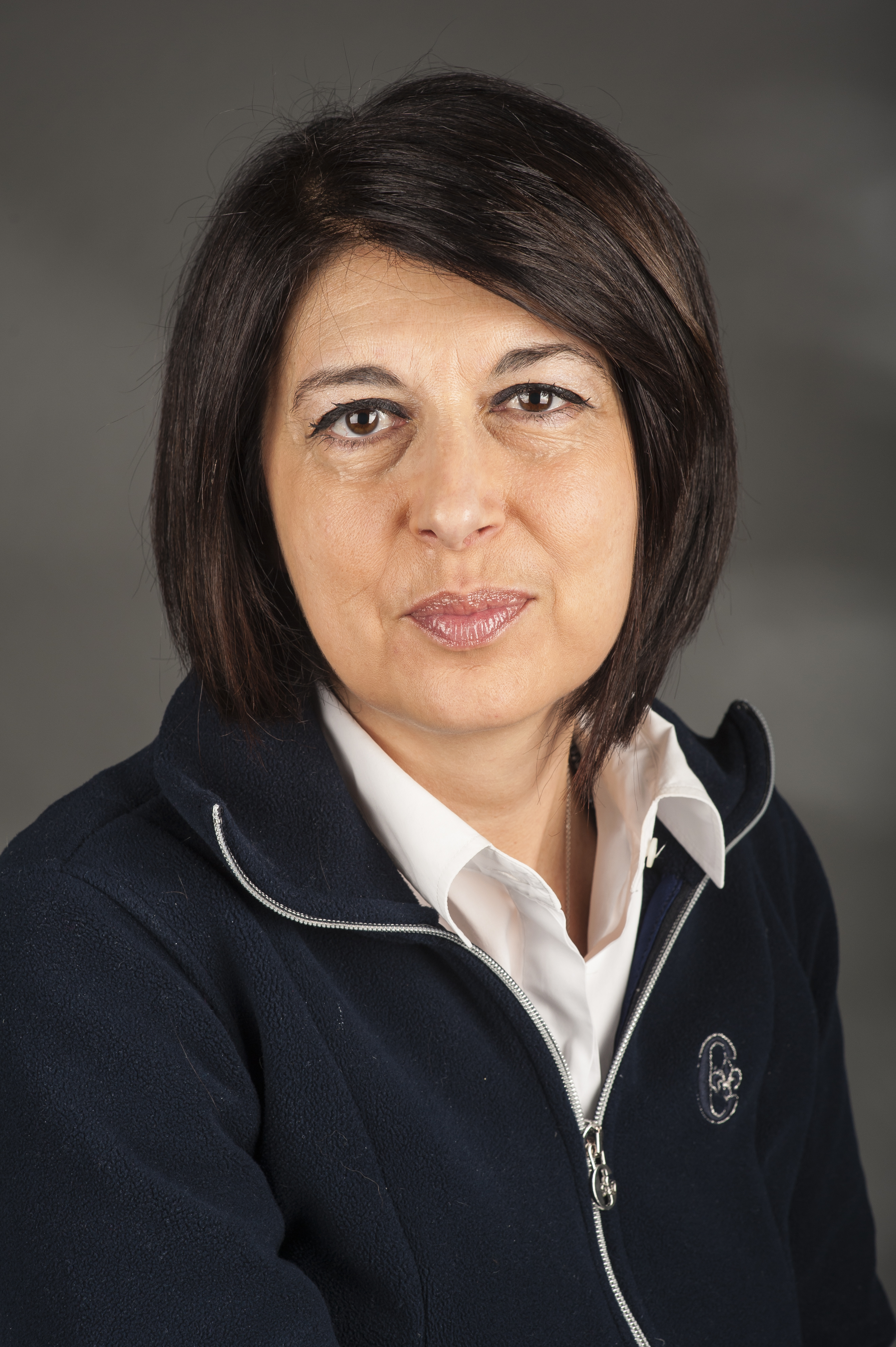
- Angelilli in 2014

Vice President of Lazio
- Incumbent
- Assumed office 13 March 2023
- President: Francesco Rocca
- Preceded by: Daniele Leodori

Vice President of the European Parliament
- In office 14 July 2009 – 1 July 2014
- President: Jerzy Buzek; Martin Schulz

Member of the European Parliament
- In office 19 July 1994 – 30 June 2014
- Constituency: Central Italy

Personal details
- Born: 1 February 1965 (age 61) Rome, Italy
- Party: FdI (2018–present)
- Other political affiliations: MSI (until 1995); AN (1995–2009); PdL (2009–2013); NCD (2013–2015); IdeA (2015–2018)
- Spouse: Andrea Augello (died in 2023)
- Education: Sapienza University of Rome
- Occupation: Lawyer • Politician

Roberta Angelilli (born 1 February 1965) is an Italian politician. She was a Member of the European Parliament from 1994 to 2014. She served as Vice President of the European Parliament from 1 July 2009 to 1 July 2014.

In 2014, Angelilli was candidate for MEP with the New Centre-Right – Union of the Centre, but she was not re-elected. She was again a candidate for MEP in 2019 on the Brothers of Italy list but was not elected.

== Education ==
- 1993: Graduate in political science at La Sapienza University of Rome

== Career ==
- 1993–1996: Secretary-General of the Youth Front
- 1996–1997: President of Youth Action
- since 1985: Director of the AN Young Entrepreneurs Office
- since 1998: Responsible for Community policies for the Rome section of AN
- 1985–1992: Director of the environmental association "Fare Verde"
- Founder of the international voluntary work organisation "Movimento Comunità"
- 1994–2014: Member of the European Parliament
