= 1975 Italian regional elections =

- 15–16 June 1975

Regional assemblies of Piedmont, Lombardy, Veneto, Liguria, Emilia-Romagna, Tuscany, Marche, Umbria, Lazio, Campania, Molise, Abruzzo, Apulia, Basilicata and Calabria
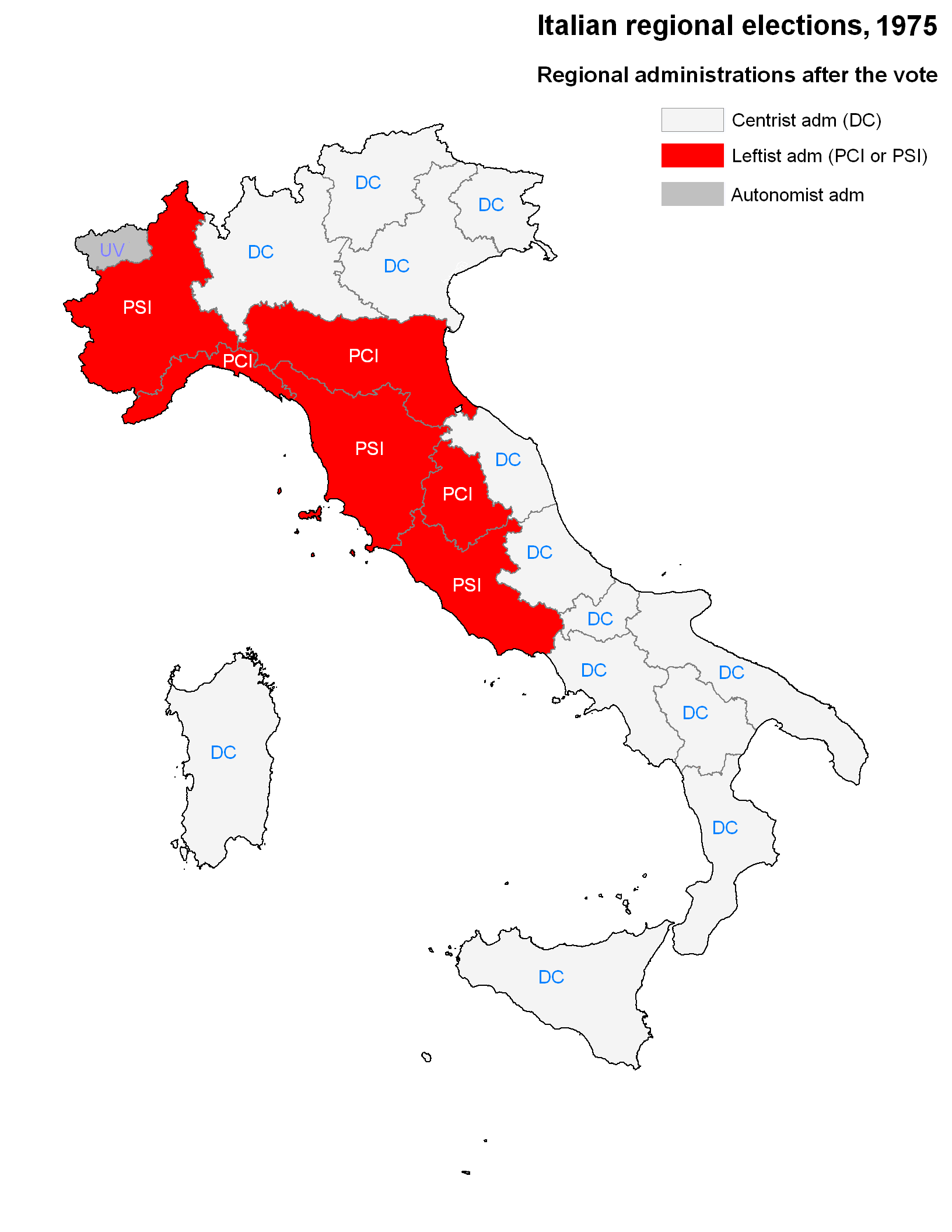

The Italian regional elections of 1975 were held on 15 and 16 June. The fifteen ordinary regions, created in 1970, elected their second assemblies. Following the 1971 census, Piedmont, Veneto and Lazio had ten more seats each.

== Electoral system ==
The pure party-list proportional representation had become the accepted electoral system of Italy, and it was adopted for the regional vote too. Each Italian province corresponded to a constituency electing a group of candidates. At the constituency level, seats were divided between open lists using the largest remainder method with Droop quota. Remaining votes and seats were transferred at the regional level, where they were divided using the Hare quota, and automatically distributed to the best-performing losers on the local lists.

== Results summary ==
Party	Votes	Votes (%)	Seats
Christian Democracy (DC)	10,699,576	35.3	277
Italian Communist Party (PCI)	10.148,723	33.4	247
Italian Socialist Party (PSI)	3,631,912	12.0	82
Italian Social Movement (MSI)	1,950,213	6.4	40
Italian Democratic Socialist Party (PSDI)	1,701,864	5.6	36
Italian Republican Party (PRI)	961,797	3.2	19
Italian Liberal Party (PLI)	749,821	2.5	11
Proletarian Democracy (DP)	271,216	0.9	4
Proletarian Unity Party (PDUP)	147,030	0.5	4
Others	71,878	0.2	-
Total	30,334,030	100	720

Nine regional councils elected administrations led by a Christian Democracy members backed by centrist alliances, while three regions, Piedmont, Liguria and Latium, changed sides, adding themselves to the traditional leftist strongholds Emilia-Romagna, Tuscany and Umbria: PCI and PSI shared three presidencies each. It was a big victory for Communist leader Enrico Berlinguer.

The results were a shock for the Christian Democrats which, even though they remained the majority party, saw the possibility of an historical defeat at national level in the next election. The party's secretary Amintore Fanfani was fired, and the government led by Aldo Moro began to run into more and more difficulties, leading to an early dissolution of the national legislature the following year.

== Results by region ==
- 1975 Abruzzo regional election
- 1975 Apulian regional election
- 1975 Basilicata regional election
- 1975 Calabrian regional election
- 1975 Campania regional election
- 1975 Emilia-Romagna regional election
- 1975 Lazio regional election
- 1975 Ligurian regional election
- 1975 Lombard regional election
- 1975 Marche regional election
- 1975 Molise regional election
- 1975 Piedmontese regional election
- 1975 Tuscan regional election
- 1975 Umbrian regional election
- 1975 Venetian regional election
