= 1980 Italian regional elections =

- 8–9 June 1980

Presidents and regional assemblies of Piedmont, Lombardy, Veneto, Liguria, Emilia-Romagna, Tuscany, Marche, Umbria, Lazio, Campania, Molise, Abruzzo, Apulia, Basilicata and Calabria
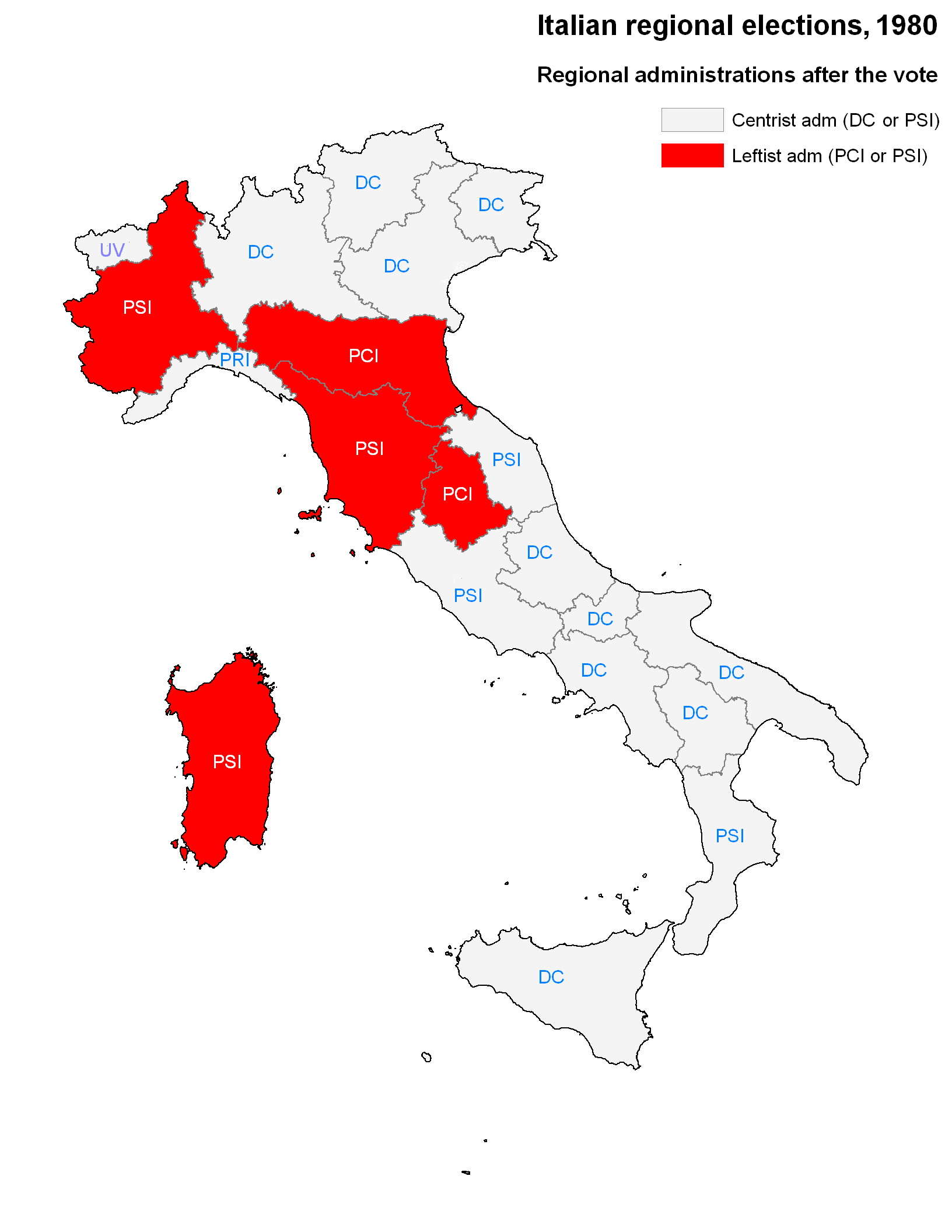

The Italian regional elections of 1980 were held on 8 and 9 June. The fifteen ordinary regions, created in 1970, elected their third assemblies.

== Electoral system ==
The pure party-list proportional representation had traditionally become the electoral system of Italy, and it was adopted for the regional vote too. Each Italian province corresponded to a constituency electing a group of candidates. At constituency level, seats were divided between open lists using the largest remainder method with Droop quota. Remaining votes and seats were transferred at regional level, where they were divided using the Hare quota, and automatically distributed to best losers into the local lists.

Regional elections were subsidized butte national government in 1980, at a cost of 15 billion lire.

== Results summary ==
Party	votes	votes (%)	seats
Christian Democracy (DC)	11,153,439	36.8	290
Italian Communist Party (PCI)	9,555,767	31.5	233
Italian Socialist Party (PSI)	3,851,722	12.7	86
Italian Social Movement (MSI)	1,785,750	5.9	37
Italian Republican Party (PRI)	922,970	3.0	18
Italian Democratic Socialist Party (PSDI)	1,505,607	5.0	31
Italian Liberal Party (PLI)	816,418	2.7	15
Proletarian Unity Party (PDUP)	372,102	1.2	8
Proletarian Democracy (DP)	274,100	0.9	2
Others	95,491	0.3	-
Total	30,333,366	100	720

The election confirmed that the post-war growing march of the Italian Communist Party, which previously seemed unlimited, had been stopped. The Christian Democrats obtained a plurality in Piedmont, even if the ruling leftist alliance maintained its overall majority. Conversely, even if remaining the first party in Ligury, the Communists lost this region because the local Socialists chose to change side, joining a centrist alliance with the DC and its minor allies. In Latium, where an assembly majority change, happened in 1977, had restored a centrist administration, the final ouster of the Communists from the government was confirmed by the polls.

== Results by region ==
- 1980 Abruzzo regional election
- 1980 Apulian regional election
- 1980 Basilicata regional election
- 1980 Calabrian regional election
- 1980 Campania regional election
- 1980 Emilia-Romagna regional election
- 1980 Lazio regional election
- 1980 Ligurian regional election
- 1980 Lombard regional election
- 1980 Marche regional election
- 1980 Molise regional election
- 1980 Piedmontese regional election
- 1980 Tuscan regional election
- 1980 Umbrian regional election
- 1980 Venetian regional election
