= 2023 Lazio regional election =

- 12–13 February 2023

All 51 seats to the Regional Council of Lazio
- Turnout: 37.2% (▼29.4%)
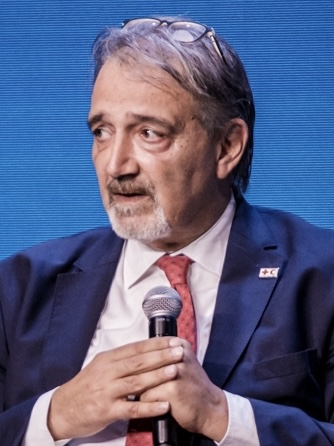

	Majority party	Minority party	Third party
Candidate	Francesco Rocca	Alessio D'Amato	Donatella Bianchi
Party	Independent	Democratic Party	Five Star Movement
Alliance	Centre-right	Centre-left	M5S–SI
Last election	15 seats, 31.2%	25 seats, 32.9%	10 seats, 27.0%
Seats won	31	15	5
Seat change	▲16	▼10	▼5
Popular vote	934,614	581,033	186,562
Percentage	53.9%	33.5%	10.8%
Swing	▲22.7%	▲0.6%	▼16.2%
- 2023 Lazio regional election map results
President before election
Daniele Leodori (acting)
Democratic Party
Elected President
Francesco Rocca
Independent

The 2023 Lazio regional election took place on 12 and 13 February 2023. It was held concurrently with the 2023 Lombard regional election, as decided by the Italian government on 9 December 2022. On 12 October 2022, the president of Lazio Nicola Zingaretti decided to step down, having been elected to the national parliament.

The election saw the centre-right coalition win with a majority of the popular vote, gaining a 11-seat majority and taking control of the Regional Council of Lazio for the first time since the 2010 Lazio regional election.

== Electoral system ==
The Regional Council of Lazio is elected with a mixed system: 39 councilmembers are chosen with a form of proportional representation using a largest remainder method with open lists, while 11 councilmembers are elected with a plurality-at-large voting system with closed lists. One seat is for the elected president.

RM	LT	VT	FR	RT	Total
30	3	3	3	0	39

== Political parties and candidates ==
Below are listed the parties and candidates for the election.

Political party or alliance	Constituent lists	Previous result		Candidate
Political party or alliance	Constituent lists	Votes (%)	Seats	Candidate
Centre-left coalition	Democratic Party	21.3	18	Alessio D'Amato
Centre-left coalition	More Europe – Radicals – Volt	2.1	1	Alessio D'Amato
Centre-left coalition	Solidary Democracy	1.9	1	Alessio D'Amato
Centre-left coalition	Greens and Left	1.1	0	Alessio D'Amato
Centre-left coalition	Action – Italia Viva	—N/a	—N/a	Alessio D'Amato
Centre-left coalition	Italian Socialist Party	—N/a	—N/a	Alessio D'Amato
Centre-left coalition	D'Amato List (including SD, PRI, and Art.1)	—N/a	—N/a	Alessio D'Amato
Centre-right coalition	Forza Italia	14.6	6	Francesco Rocca
Centre-right coalition	League	10.0	4	Francesco Rocca
Centre-right coalition	Brothers of Italy	8.7	3	Francesco Rocca
Centre-right coalition	Union of the Centre – Green is Popular	1.6	1	Francesco Rocca
Centre-right coalition	Us Moderates – Renaissance	1.6	1	Francesco Rocca
Centre-right coalition	Rocca for President (including AP)	—N/a	—N/a	Francesco Rocca
Five Star Movement coalition	Five Star Movement	22.1	10	Donatella Bianchi
Five Star Movement coalition	Progressive Pole (Note: Including Italian Left and Coordination 2050)	3.5	1	Donatella Bianchi
People's Union		–	–	Rosa Rinaldi
Italian Communist Party		–	–	Sonia Pecorilli

== Opinion polling ==
=== Candidates ===
Date	Polling firm	Sample size	Rocca	D'Amato	Bianchi	Rinaldi	Pecorilli	Others	Lead
13–16 Jan 2023	Tecnè	1,000	46.0	35.0	16.0	—N/a	—N/a	3.0	11.0
9–11 Jan 2023	BiDiMedia	2,700	45.1	36.0	15.3	1.5	0.5	1.6	9.1
27–28 Dec 2022	IZI	1,012	42.6	34.8	18.3	—N/a	—N/a	4.3	7.8

==== Hypothetical candidates ====
Date	Polling firm	Sample size	Rocca	Other CDX	D'Amato	M5S	Left	Others	Lead
14–15 Nov 2022	Winpoll	1,000	40.5	—N/a	38.2	12.9 (Note: Stefano Fassina)	—N/a	8.4	2.3
12–14 Nov 2022	IZI	1,009	—N/a	48.8 (Note: Fabio Rampelli)	27.4	23.8 (Note: Unknown candidate)	with M5S	—N/a	21.4
12–14 Nov 2022	IZI	1,009	—N/a	46.6	26.4	17.8	9.2	—N/a	20.2
12–14 Nov 2022	IZI	1,009	—N/a	48.8	32.9	18.3	with CSX	—N/a	15.9

=== Political parties ===
Date	Polling firm	Sample size	Centre-right						Centre-left							M5S–SI			AVS	UP	PCI	Others	Lead
Date	Polling firm	Sample size	FdI	FI	Lega	Rocca	NM	UdC	PD	A–IV	+E	EV	D'Amato	PSI	DemoS	M5S	Bianchi	SI	AVS	UP	PCI	Others	Lead
13–16 Jan 2023	Tecnè	1,000	34.0	5.5	5.0	—N/a	—N/a	—N/a	17.0	8.0	3.0	3.5	—N/a	—N/a	—N/a	15.0	—N/a	1.5	—N/a	—N/a	—N/a	7.5	17.0
9–11 Jan 2023	BiDiMedia	2,700	35.3	3.8	4.1	1.7	0.5	0.5	17.5	8.7	2.6	2.7	2.5	0.5	0.8	13.0	—N/a	2.0	—N/a	1.6	0.5	1.7	17.8
27–28 Dec 2022	IZI	1,012	32.4	5.7	4.1	0.5	—N/a	—N/a	18.1	6.7	3.0	2.9	1.6	1.4	0.2	16.5	2.8	—N/a	—N/a	—N/a	—N/a	4.1	13.3
14–15 Nov 2022	Winpoll	1,000	33.8	6.5	5.2	—N/a	—N/a	—N/a	17.0	8.2	2.8	—N/a	—N/a	—N/a	—N/a	15.9	—N/a	—N/a	3.5	1.3	—N/a	5.8	16.8
12–14 Nov 2022	IZI	1,009	32.6	5.8	5.5	—N/a	—N/a	—N/a	16.7	7.0	2.5	—N/a	—N/a	—N/a	—N/a	16.7	—N/a	—N/a	4.2	—N/a	—N/a	9.9	15.9

== Results ==
2023 Lazio regional election party comuni results

12–13 February 2023 Lazio regional election results
Candidates	Votes	%	Seats	Parties	Votes	%	Seats
Francesco Rocca	934,614	53.88	1				
Francesco Rocca	934,614	53.88	1	Brothers of Italy	519,633	33.62	22
Francesco Rocca	934,614	53.88	1	League	131,631	8.52	3
Francesco Rocca	934,614	53.88	1	Forza Italia	130,368	8.43	3
Francesco Rocca	934,614	53.88	1	Rocca List	31,437	2.03	1
Francesco Rocca	934,614	53.88	1	Union of the Centre	24,983	1.62	1
Francesco Rocca	934,614	53.88	1	Us Moderates	17,398	1.13	–
Francesco Rocca	934,614	53.88	1	Total	855,450	55.34	30
Alessio D'Amato	581,033	33.50	1				
Alessio D'Amato	581,033	33.50	1	Democratic Party	313,023	20.25	10
Alessio D'Amato	581,033	33.50	1	Action – Italia Viva	75,272	4.87	2
Alessio D'Amato	581,033	33.50	1	D'Amato List	47,184	3.05	1
Alessio D'Amato	581,033	33.50	1	Greens and Left	42,314	2.74	1
Alessio D'Amato	581,033	33.50	1	Solidary Democracy	18,417	1.19	–
Alessio D'Amato	581,033	33.50	1	More Europe – Radicals – Volt	14,870	0.96	–
Alessio D'Amato	581,033	33.50	1	Italian Socialist Party	7,974	0.52	–
Alessio D'Amato	581,033	33.50	1	Total	519,066	33.58	14
Donatella Bianchi	186,562	10.76	–	Five Star Movement	132,041	8.54	4
Donatella Bianchi	186,562	10.76	–	Progressive Pole	7,974	1.21	1
Donatella Bianchi	186,562	10.76	–	Total	150,768	9.75	5
Sonia Pecorilli	16,932	0.98	–	Italian Communist Party	10,212	0.66	–
Rosa Rinaldi	15,331	0.88	–	People's Union	10,289	0.67	–
Blank and invalid votes	45,111	2.53					
Total candidates	1,734,472	100.00	2	Total parties	1,545,785	100.00	49
Registered voters/turnout	4,791,612	37.20					
Source: Ministry of the Interior
