= Monica Cirinnà =

Italian politician

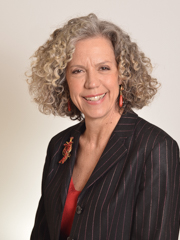

Member of Senate of the Republic
- In office 15 March 2013 – 13 October 2022
- Constituency: Lazio

Personal details
- Born: 15 February 1963 (age 63) Rome, Italy
- Party: Greens (1993-2008); Democratic Party (since 2008)
- Spouse: Esterino Montino
- Education: Sapienza University of Rome
- Website: http://www.monicacirinna.it/

Monica Cirinnà (born 15 February 1963) is an Italian politician and a senator of the Democratic Party from 2013 to 2022.

== Biography ==
Cirinnà graduated in law in 1993 at Sapienza University of Rome. She is known for being the author of the bill on civil unions in Italy, which was approved by the Senate of the Republic in February 2016 after removing adoption rights, and by the Chamber of Deputies in May of the same year.
