= Piero Badaloni =

Italian politician and journalist

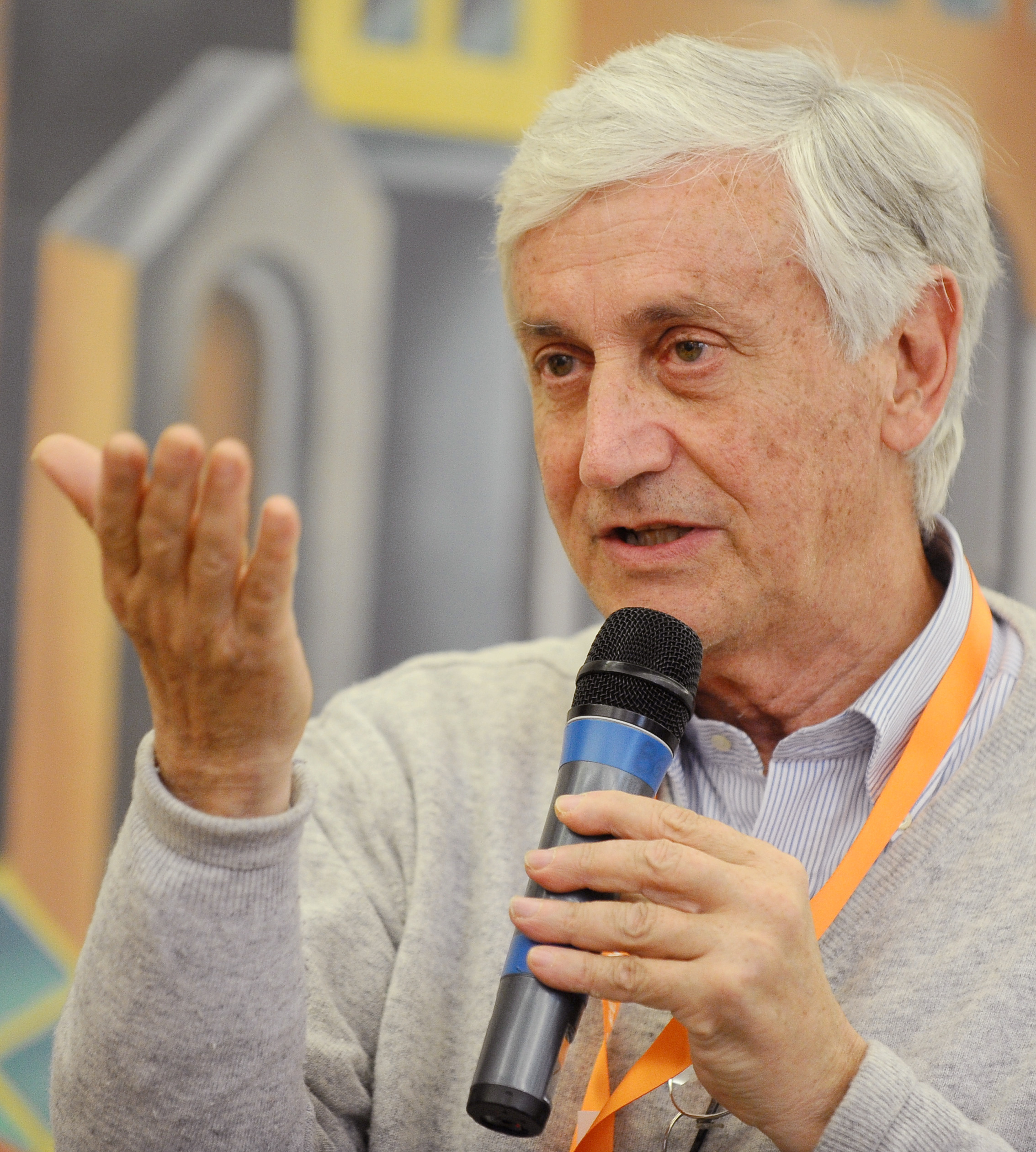

President of Lazio
- In office 19 May 1995 – 12 May 2000
- Preceded by: Arturo Osio
- Succeeded by: Francesco Storace

Personal details
- Born: 8 September 1946 (age 79) Rome, Italy
- Party: Centre-left independent
- Height: 1.78 m (5 ft 10 in)
- Occupation: Journalist, politician

Piero Badaloni (born 8 September 1946) is an Italian journalist and politician who served as President of Lazio from 1995 to 2000.

== Biography ==
=== Journalistic career ===
Badaloni began his journalistic career in 1971 in Rai, dealing with reports and surveys. For the services on the Irpinia earthquake, he was awarded in 1980 with the "chronicler of the year" award by the national Union of Italian chroniclers. From 1981 to 1984 and from 1991 to 1995, Badaloni was one of the hosts of TG1.

Badaloni has also been the author and host of a series of journalistic programs, such as Unomattina.

After his term as President of Lazio ended, Badaloni returned to Rai and becomes a correspondent from the Paris office, then from Brussels, and finally from Berlin. Finally, from 2009 to 2011, Badaloni has been the correspondent from the Madrid office.

Since February 2017, Badaloni is hosting the talk show Avanti il prossimo on TV2000.

=== President of Lazio ===
At the 1995 regional election, Badaloni, who was very close to the Italian People's Party, became the Olive Tree candidate for the office of President of Lazio and is elected, defeating the Pole for Freedoms candidate Alberto Michelini. He seeks for re-election at the 2000 regional election, but is defeated by the House of Freedoms candidate and far-right leader Francesco Storace.
