= 1990 Lazio regional election =

Italian election

The Lazio regional election of 1990 took place on 6 and 7 May 1990.

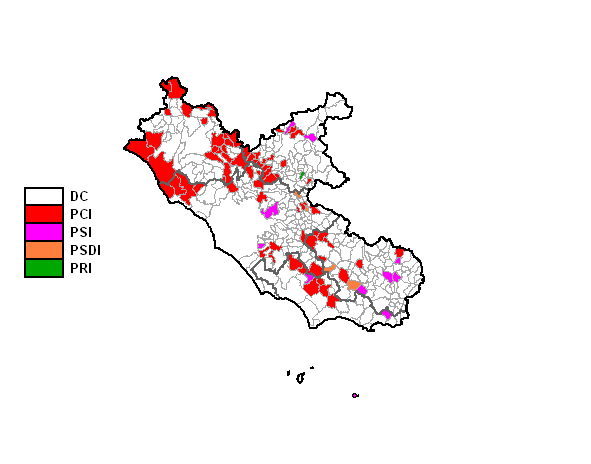
Largest party by municipality

== Events ==
Christian Democracy was by far the largest party, largely ahead of the Italian Communist Party, which placed second. After the election Christian Democrat Rodolfo Gigli formed a government which included the Italian Socialist Party and some minor parties (Pentapartito).

After 1992, following the Tangentopoli scandals, Gigli was succeeded by a succession of governments led by Giorgio Pasetto (Christian Democrat, 1992–1994), Carlo Proietti (Democratic Party of the Left, 1994–1995) and Arturo Osio (Green, 1995).

== Results ==
Parties	votes	votes (%)	seats
Christian Democracy	1,123,076	34.5	22
Italian Communist Party	776,485	23.8	15
Italian Socialist Party	464,958	14.3	9
Italian Social Movement	213,174	6.5	4
Italian Republican Party	155,179	4.8	3
Green List	125,460	3.9	2
Italian Democratic Socialist Party	90,300	2.8	2
Rainbow Greens	78,683	2.4	1
Antiprohibitionists on Drugs	58,756	1.8	1
Italian Liberal Party	58,720	1.8	1
Proletarian Democracy	30,165	0.9	-
Pensioners' List	26,966	0.8	-
Hunting Fishing Environment	19,735	0.6	-
Pensioners' Alliance	19,311	0.6	-
Centre League Lazio	5,872	0.2	-
Motorists	5,165	0.2	-
Local list	3,561	0.1	-
Italian National Hunting Movement	3,492	0.1	-
New People's Party	1,350	0.0	-
Total	3,260,408	100.0	60

Source: Ministry of the Interior
