= Esterino Montino =

Italian politician

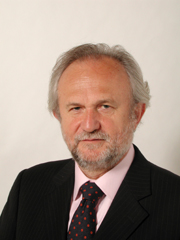

Mayor of Fiumicino
- In office 10 June 2013 – 17 May 2023
- Preceded by: Mario Canapini
- Succeeded by: Mario Baccini

Vice-president of Lazio
- In office 5 May 2008 – 29 March 2010
- Appointed by: Piero Marrazzo
- Preceded by: Massimo Pompili
- Succeeded by: Luciano Ciocchetti

Member of Senate of the Republic
- In office 13 May 2001 – 28 April 2008

Personal details
- Born: 6 April 1948 (age 78) Rome, Italy
- Party: PCI (till 1991); PDS (1991-1998); DS (1998-2007); PD (since 2007)
- Spouse: Monica Cirinnà
- Profession: Trade unionist

Esterino Montino (born 6 April 1948), is an Italian politician.

== Biography ==
A Senator during the 14th and the 15th legislatures of Italy, Montino has been the Vice-president of Regional Administration of Lazio, deputy of President Piero Marrazzo since 2005, and councilor for Town Planning. Since the presidential resignation of October 27, 2009, he took the provisional regency of the administration until the planned election of March 2010.

He is married with politician Monica Cirinnà.

In 2013 he has been elected mayor of Fiumicino, and has been re-elected in 2018.
