= Giorgio Pasetto =

Italian politician (1941–2022)

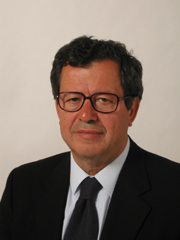
- Pasetto in 2006

Member of the Senate of the Republic of Italy
- In office 28 April 2006 – 28 April 2008
- Constituency: Lazio

Member of the Chamber of Deputies of Italy
- In office 9 May 1996 – 27 April 2006
- Constituency: Lazio 1

President of Lazio
- In office 5 August 1992 – 21 February 1994
- Preceded by: Rodolfo Gigli
- Succeeded by: Carlo Proietti

Personal details
- Born: 4 July 1941 Nettuno, Italy
- Died: 12 May 2022 (aged 80) Rome, Italy
- Party: DC (1992-1994); PPI; DL
- Height: 1.68 m (5 ft 6 in)

Giorgio Pasetto (4 July 1941 – 12 May 2022) was an Italian politician. He was member of Christian Democracy, the Italian People's Party, and Democracy is Freedom – The Daisy. He served as President of Lazio from 1992 to 1994, was a member of the Chamber of Deputies from 1996 to 2006, and a Senator from 2006 to 2008. He died in Rome on 12 May 2022 at the age of 80.

== Biography ==
A former member of the Christian Democracy (Italy) party, he became mayor of Anzio at the age of 29. He later served as a provincial councilor in Rome and then as a regional councilor, before being elected president of the Lazio Region from 1992 to 1994. After the dissolution of the Christian Democrats, he joined the Italian People’s Party (PPI) and later La Margherita; he was elected to the Chamber of Deputies in the 13th and 14th legislatures as a member of the Olive Tree coalition; he served on the Budget Committee, the Transportation Committee, the Supervisory Committee on the Cassa Depositi e Prestiti, and the Parliamentary Committee for Monitoring the Implementation of the Schengen Agreement.

In 2006, he was elected to the Senate of the Republic for the 15th legislature, again as a member of L'Ulivo; he served on the Public Works and Communications Committee and the Supervisory Committee on the Tax Registry. In 2007, he joined the newly formed Democratic Party (Italy); his term in Parliament ended in 2008.
