= 2000 Lazio regional election =

- 16 April 2000

All 60 seats to the Regional Council of Lazio
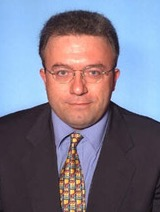

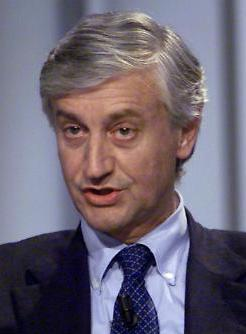
	Majority party	Minority party
Leader	Francesco Storace	Piero Badaloni
Party	National Alliance	Democrats
Alliance	Pole for Freedoms	The Olive Tree
Seats won	38	22
Seat change	▲15	▼15
Popular vote	1,553,562	1,392,190
Percentage	51.3%	46.0%
Swing	▲3.3%	▼2.1%
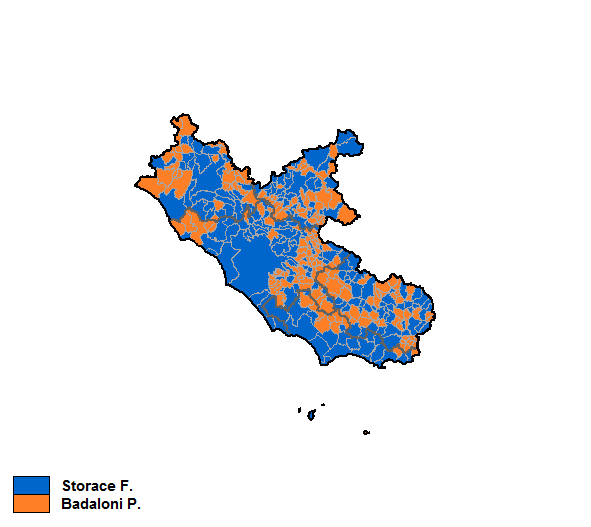
President of Lazio before election
Piero Badaloni
Democrats
President of Lazio
Francesco Storace
National Alliance

The Lazio regional election of 2000 took place on 16 April 2000.

Francesco Storace (National Alliance) was elected President, defeating incumbent Piero Badaloni (The Democrats).

== Results ==
16 April 2000 Lazio regional election results
Candidates	Votes	%	Seats	Parties	Votes	%	Seats
Francesco Storace	1,553,562	51.29	12				
Francesco Storace	1,553,562	51.29	12	National Alliance	629,452	23.10	12
Francesco Storace	1,553,562	51.29	12	Forza Italia	585,182	21.48	11
Francesco Storace	1,553,562	51.29	12	Christian Democratic Centre	126,567	4.65	2
Francesco Storace	1,553,562	51.29	12	United Christian Democrats	58,100	2.13	1
Francesco Storace	1,553,562	51.29	12	Socialist Party	16,599	0.61	–
Francesco Storace	1,553,562	51.29	12	United Pensioners	14,666	0.54	–
Francesco Storace	1,553,562	51.29	12	Christian Democratic Party	9,285	0.34	–
Francesco Storace	1,553,562	51.29	12	The Liberals Sgarbi	7,274	0.27	–
Francesco Storace	1,553,562	51.29	12	Modern Democracy	2,594	0.10	–
Francesco Storace	1,553,562	51.29	12	Total	1,449,719	53.21	26
Piero Badaloni	1,392,190	45.97	1				
Piero Badaloni	1,392,190	45.97	1	Democrats of the Left	543,041	19.93	10
Piero Badaloni	1,392,190	45.97	1	Communist Refoundation Party	147,030	5.40	3
Piero Badaloni	1,392,190	45.97	1	The Democrats	131,644	4.83	2
Piero Badaloni	1,392,190	45.97	1	Italian People's Party – Italian Renewal	129,790	4.76	2
Piero Badaloni	1,392,190	45.97	1	Federation of the Greens	85,494	3.14	1
Piero Badaloni	1,392,190	45.97	1	SDI – PRI	61,290	2.25	1
Piero Badaloni	1,392,190	45.97	1	Party of Italian Communists	59,976	2.20	1
Piero Badaloni	1,392,190	45.97	1	Union of Democrats for Europe	50,400	1.85	1
Piero Badaloni	1,392,190	45.97	1	Total	1,208,665	44.37	21
Rita Bernardini	65,587	2.17	–	Bonino List	53,772	1.97	–
Marina Larena	9,880	0.33	–	Humanist Party	6,690	0.25	–
Severino Antinori	7,582	0.25	–	Liberal Autonomy	5,474	0.20	–
Total candidates	3,028,801	100.00	13	Total parties	2,724,320	100.00	47
Source: Ministry of the Interior
