= 2013 Lazio regional election =

- 24–25 February 2013

All 51 seats to the Regional Council of Lazio
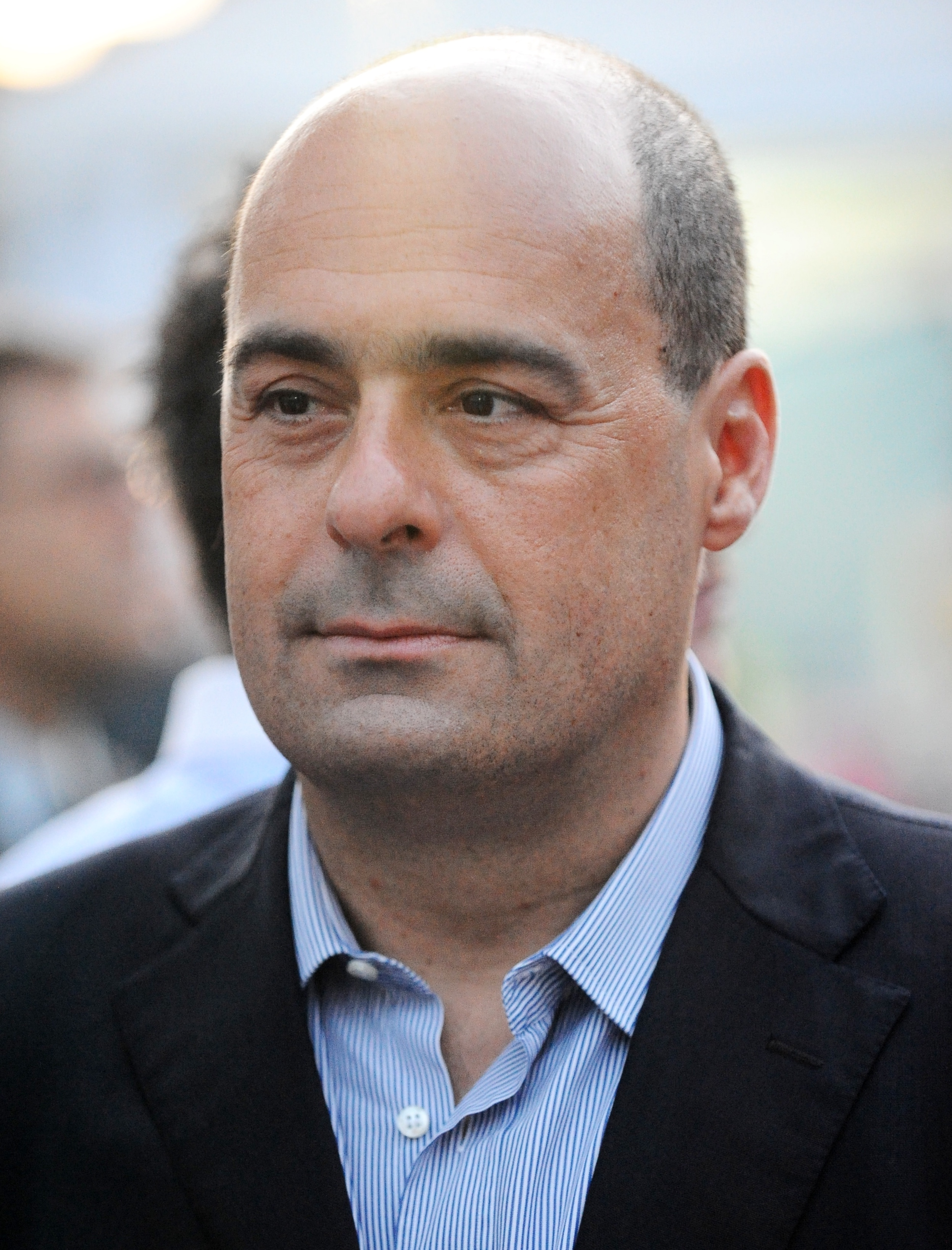

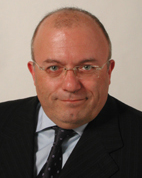

	Majority party	Minority party	Third party
Leader	Nicola Zingaretti	Francesco Storace	Davide Barillari
Party	Democratic Party	Right	Five Star Movement
Alliance	Centre-left	Centre-right	—
Seats won	28	13	7
Seat change	▼1	▼32	new
Popular vote	1,330,398	959,685	661,865
Percentage	40.7%	29.3%	20.2%
Swing	▼7.6%	▼21.8%	new
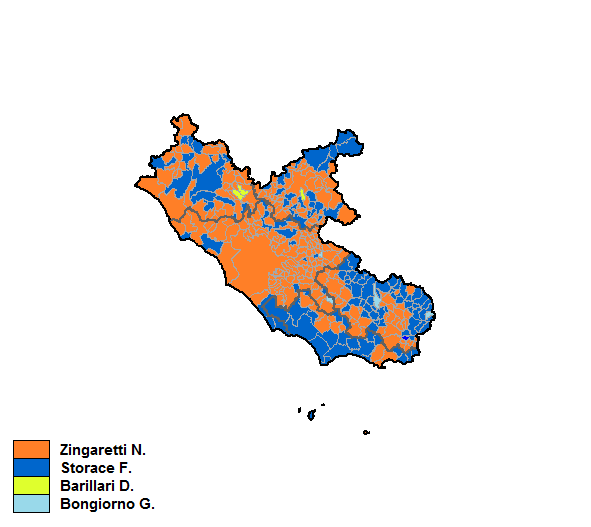
President of Lazio before election
Renata Polverini
People of Freedom
President of Lazio
Nicola Zingaretti
Democratic Party

The Lazio regional election of 2013 took place in Lazio, Italy, on 24–25 February 2013.

Renata Polverini of The People of Freedom (PdL), who was elected president in 2010, was toppled by an expense scandal in October 2012 which led to her resignation.

After that, the candidate of Democratic Party (PD) seemed a shoo-in for victory. In December 2012, the Commissioner of the Province of Rome, Nicola Zingaretti, decided to run as Governor of Lazio for 2013 regional election. As Lazio had been a traditional stronghold of National Alliance party, the former president Francesco Storace, secretary of the national-conservative party The Right and supported by Silvio Berlusconi's coalition, was chosen for the center-right coalition.

The other candidates were Davide Barillari (M5S), who received the 20% of the votes, Giulia Bongiorno (Civic Choice) and Alessandro Ruotolo (Civil Revolution).

== Electoral system ==
The Regional Council is elected with a mixed system: 39 MPs are chosen with a form of proportional representation using a largest remainder method with open lists and a 5% threshold, while 11 MPs are elected with a block voting system with closed lists. One seat is for the elected president.

RM	LT	VT	FR	RT	Total
30	3	3	3	0	39

== Results ==
24–25 February 2013 Lazio regional election results
Candidates	Votes	%	Seats	Parties	Votes	%	Seats
Nicola Zingaretti	1,330,398	40.65	11				
Nicola Zingaretti	1,330,398	40.65	11	Democratic Party	834,286	29.72	13
Nicola Zingaretti	1,330,398	40.65	11	Zingaretti List	126,646	4.51	2
Nicola Zingaretti	1,330,398	40.65	11	Left Ecology Freedom	103,692	3.69	1
Nicola Zingaretti	1,330,398	40.65	11	Italian Socialist Party	55,588	1.98	1
Nicola Zingaretti	1,330,398	40.65	11	Democratic Centre	48,748	1.74	1
Nicola Zingaretti	1,330,398	40.65	11	Total	1,168,960	41.64	18
Francesco Storace	959,683	29.32	1				
Francesco Storace	959,683	29.32	1	The People of Freedom	595,220	21.20	9
Francesco Storace	959,683	29.32	1	Brothers of Italy	107,731	3.84	1
Francesco Storace	959,683	29.32	1	The Right	94,113	3.35	1
Francesco Storace	959,683	29.32	1	Storace List	45,997	1.64	1
Francesco Storace	959,683	29.32	1	Centre League	32,979	1.17	–
Francesco Storace	959,683	29.32	1	Federation of Christian Populars	18,176	0.65	–
Francesco Storace	959,683	29.32	1	Citizens and Workers Movement	10,959	0.39	–
Francesco Storace	959,683	29.32	1	Moderates in Revolution	8,213	0.29	–
Francesco Storace	959,683	29.32	1	Great South	3,905	0.14	–
Francesco Storace	959,683	29.32	1	Green Front – All Together for Italy	2,021	0.07	–
Francesco Storace	959,683	29.32	1	Liberal Network	1,083	0.04	–
Francesco Storace	959,683	29.32	1	Alliance of the Centre	464	0.02	–
Francesco Storace	959,683	29.32	1	Total	920,861	32.80	12
Davide Barillari	661,865	20.22	–	Five Star Movement	467,249	16.64	7
Giulia Bongiorno	154,986	4.74	–	Bongiorno President (incl. SC, UDC, FLI)	124,244	4.43	2
Sandro Ruotolo	71,219	2.18	–	Civil Revolution	58,685	2.09	–
Simone Di Stefano	18,491	0.80	–	CasaPound	18,491	0.66	–
Alessandra Baldassarri	18,772	0.57	–	Act to Stop the Decline	14,315	0.51	–
Giuseppe Rossodivita	15,567	0.45	–	Amnesty Justice Freedom List	10,956	0.39	–
Roberto Fiore	12,168	0.37	–	New Force	7,774	0.28	–
Luca Romagnoli	11,245	0.34	–	Tricolour Flame	7,473	0.27	–
Luigi Sorge	8,980	0.27	–	Workers' Communist Party	5,886	0.21	–
Giuseppe Strano	2,802	0.09	–	Citizens' Network	2,536	0.09	–
Total candidates	3,272,742	100.00	12	Total parties	2,807,430	100.00	39
Source: Ministry of the Interior
