= Bruno Landi (politician) =

Italian politician (1939–2026)

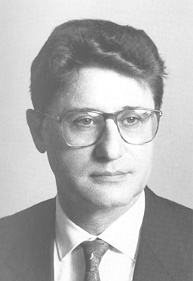

President of Lazio
- In office 17 May 1987 – 27 July 1990
- Preceded by: Sebastiano Montali
- Succeeded by: Rodolfo Gigli
- In office 24 March 1983 – 18 April 1984
- Preceded by: Giulio Santarelli
- Succeeded by: Gabriele Panizzi

Member of the Chamber of Deputies of Italy for Lazio 1
- In office 22 April 1992 – 14 April 1994

Personal details
- Born: 19 September 1939 Capalbio, Italy
- Died: 20 February 2026 (aged 86) Rome, Italy
- Party: PSI
- Occupation: Lecturer

Bruno Landi (19 September 1939 – 20 February 2026) was an Italian politician. A member of the Italian Socialist Party, he served as president of Lazio from 1983 to 1984 and 1987 to 1990, and was a member of the Chamber of Deputies from 1992 to 1994.

Landi died in Rome on 20 February 2026, at the age of 86.
