= 1985 Lazio regional election =

The Lazio regional election of 1985 took place on 12 May 1985.

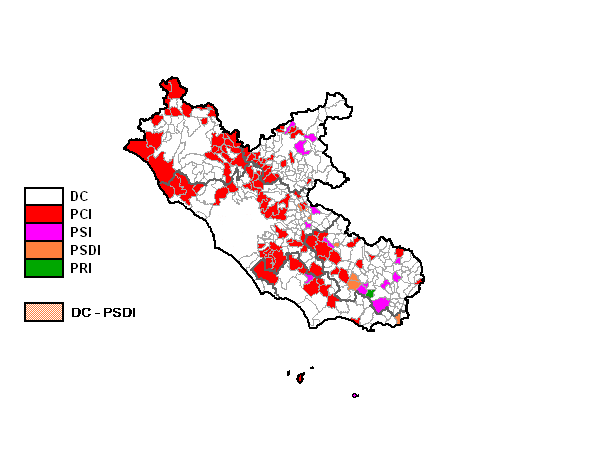
Largest party by municipality

== Events ==
Christian Democracy resulted the largest party, ahead of the Italian Communist Party. After the election Sebastiano Montali, a Socialist, formed a government which included Christian Democracy. In 1987 Montali was replaced by Bruno Landi, a former Socialist President, who led the Region until 1990.

== Results ==
Parties	votes	votes (%)	seats
Christian Democracy	1,132,083	33.6	21
Italian Communist Party	1,008,155	29.9	18
Italian Socialist Party	395,386	11.7	7
Italian Social Movement	327,030	9.7	6
Italian Republican Party	133,309	4.0	2
Italian Democratic Socialist Party	129,364	3.8	2
Green List	78,293	2.3	1
Italian Liberal Party	67,037	2.0	1
Proletarian Democracy	43,123	1.3	1
Pensioners Italian Alliance – Venetian League	30,273	0.9	1
Pensioners' National Party	7,407	0.2	-
Struggle List	5,617	0.2	-
National Monarchist Party	4,755	0.1	-
Valdostan Union – Democratic Party – others	4,624	0.1	-
European Social Democracy	4,200	0.1	-
Humanist Party	2,763	0.1	-
Total	3,373,419	100.0	60

Source: Ministry of the Interior
