= Francesco Rocca (politician) =

Italian politician (born 1965)

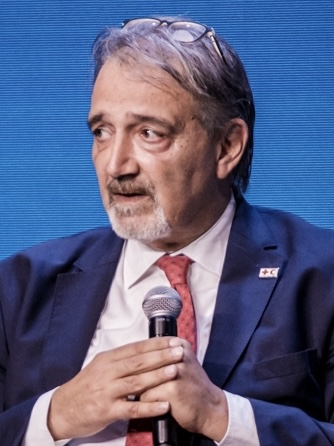
- Rocca in 2021

President of Lazio
- Incumbent
- Assumed office 2 March 2023
- Preceded by: Nicola Zingaretti

President of the IFRC
- In office 6 November 2017 – 11 December 2023
- Preceded by: Tadateru Konoe
- Succeeded by: Kate Forbes

President of the Italian Red Cross
- In office 28 January 2013 – 29 December 2022
- Preceded by: Massimo Barra
- Succeeded by: Rosario Valastro

Personal details
- Born: 1 September 1965 (age 61) Rome, Italy
- Party: Independent
- Children: 2
- Education: Sapienza University of Rome
- Profession: Lawyer, manager

Francesco Rocca (born 1 September 1965) is an Italian independent politician and former President of the Italian Red Cross who has served as President of Lazio since March 2023.

== Early life and education ==
Rocca was born in Rome on 1 September 1965.

Aged 19, Rocca was convicted of drug dealing, after selling 150 grams (5.3 oz) of heroin on behalf of a drug ring based in Casal Palocco. He was arrested in 1985 and sentenced to three years' imprisonment.

During his university years, Rocca volunteered with the Jesuit Refugee Service, then with Caritas, and finally with the Piccola Casa della Divina Provvidenza in Cottolengo.

Rocca graduated in law, and practised criminal law between 1990 and 2003. For his cases involving organised crime, he received five years' guarded protection.

== Charitable work ==
=== Healthcare management ===
From 1996 to 2004, Rocca was president and Commissioner of the Public Institute of Assistance and Charity (IPAB) "Santa Maria in Aquiro". From 2001 to 2003, he was President of IPAB "Asilo della Patria".

In 2003, Francesco Storace, President of Lazio, appointed Rocca as General Director and Extraordinary Commissioner of the Sant'Andrea Hospital. Through this appointment, Rocca became a member of the Steering and Verification Council of the National Institute for Infectious Diseases 'Lazzaro Spallanzani' from 2007 to 2010, and a member of the Evaluation Unit of the National Cancer Institute G. Pascale Foundation, IRCCS of Naples, from 2005 to 2019. Rocca stepped down from his directorship of the hospital in 2007. In 2011, Rocca was appointed Extraordinary Commissioner of the ASL Napoli 2 and General Director of IDI in 2017.

In parallel with his work as a lawyer, he continued his commitment to voluntary work through the Ethiopian NGO Hansenian's Ethiopian Welfare Organization of which, for a short time, he was also director general free of charge, and with the Italian Red Cross, adhering to the component of blood donors.

=== Red Cross ===
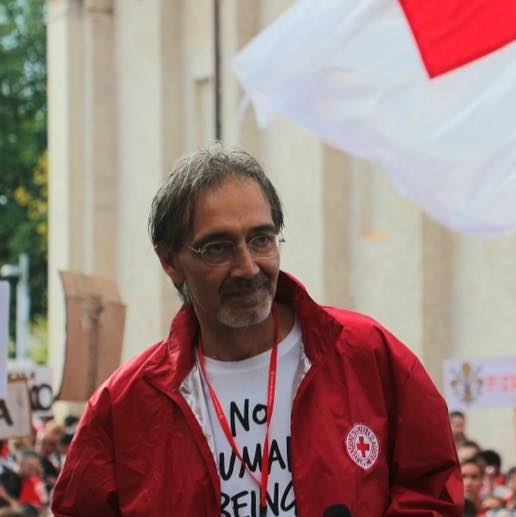
Rocca in 2017

Rocca joined the Italian Red Cross in June 2007, as Head of the Emergency Operations Department.

Rocca became an extraordinary commissioner in November 2008. During the General Assembly in Kenya in 2009, Rocca was elected as a member of the Board of Directors of the International Federation of Red Cross and Red Crescent Societies.

In January 2013, he assumed the position of national president of the Red Cross. The office of president was renewed for the first time in May 2016, and the second time in May 2020.

On 6 November 2017, during the General Assembly in Antalya, Rocca was the first Italian to be elected President of the International Federation.

Rocca resigned from his roles in the Italian Red Cross to pursue his candidacy as President of Lazio.

== Political career ==
=== Early political career ===
During his high school years, Rocca enrolled in the Youth Front, the youth organisation of the neo-fascist Italian Social Movement.

During Gianni Alemanno's mayorship of the Municipality of Rome, Rocca served as head of the municipal Health and Social Activities Department.

=== President of Lazio ===
At the end of 2022, in the vicinity of regional elections in February 2023, the Prime Minister Giorgia Meloni proposed Rocca's name as the official candidate of the centre-right coalition for the office of President of Lazio. By accepting the candidacy, Rocca left his leadership of the Italian Red Cross on 29 December 2022.

Rocca was supported by Forza Italia, Lega, Us Moderates, and Union of the Centre. In the electoral round, characterized by a very low turnout, Rocca was elected governor with 54% of the votes.

=== Controversies ===
He controversially doubted the Santa Palomba waste-to-energy plant.

In 2023, Lazio planned on supporting the LGBTQ+ Pride Event in Rome but has since backed out of supporting the event saying that they did not want to be associated with promoting "illegal conduct", specifically referring to issues regarding surrogacy, which is illegal in Italy.

== Personal life ==
Rocca has two sons.
