= 1970 Lazio regional election =

Regional elections in Italy

The Lazio regional election of 1970 took place on 7–8 June 1970.

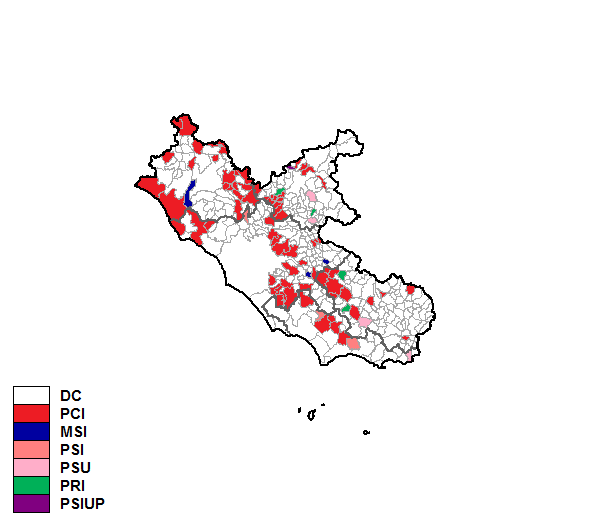
Largest party by municipality

== Events ==
Christian Democracy resulted the largest party, followed by the Italian Communist Party. After the election Christian Democrat Girolamo Mechelli formed a centre-left government which included the Italian Socialist Party, the Unitary Socialist Party and the Italian Republican Party (organic Centre-left). In 1972 Mechelli was replaced by fellow Christian Democrat Luigi Cipriani, to whom Rinaldo Santini succeeded in 1973.

== Results ==
| Parties | votes | votes (%) | seats |
|---|---|---|---|
| Christian Democracy | 890,749 | 33.2 | 18 |
| Italian Communist Party | 710,273 | 26.4 | 13 |
| Italian Social Movement | 274,244 | 10.2 | 5 |
| Italian Socialist Party | 235,730 | 8.8 | 4 |
| Unitary Socialist Party | 205,206 | 7.7 | 3 |
| Italian Liberal Party | 156,645 | 5.8 | 3 |
| Italian Republican Party | 98,572 | 3.7 | 2 |
| Italian Socialist Party of Proletarian Unity | 70,421 | 2.6 | 1 |
| Italian Democratic Party of Monarchist Unity | 33,631 | 1.3 | 1 |
| Red Star | 6,665 | 0.3 | - |
| National Democratic Party | 1,958 | 0.1 | - |
| Total | 2,684,094 | 100.0 | 50 |

Source: Ministry of the Interior
