= 1980 Lazio regional election =

The Lazio regional election of 1980 took place on 8 June 1980.

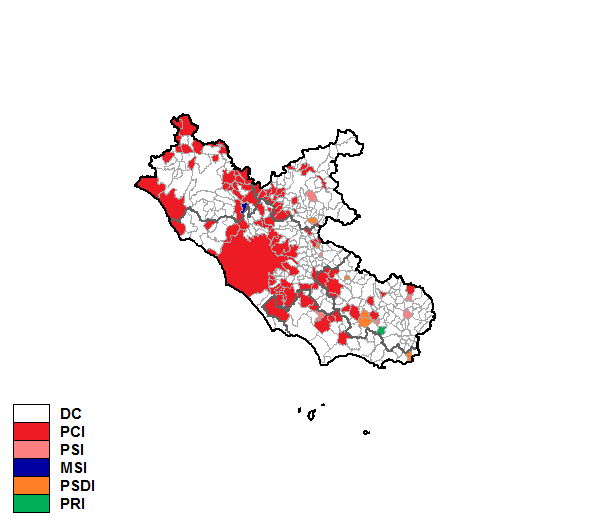
Largest party by municipality

== Events ==
Christian Democracy became the largest party, ahead of the Italian Communist Party. After the election Giulio Santarelli, the incumbent Socialist President, continued to govern at the head of a coalition consisting of Christian Democracy. In 1983 Santarelli was replaced by Bruno Landi, who was succeeded by Gabriele Panizzi in 1984.

== Results ==
Parties	votes	votes (%)	seats
Christian Democracy	1,064,586	34.1	22
Italian Communist Party	959,401	30.7	19
Italian Socialist Party	332,026	10.6	6
Italian Social Movement	315,142	10.1	6
Italian Democratic Socialist Party	165,054	5.3	3
Italian Republican Party	116,585	3.7	2
Italian Liberal Party	83,453	2.7	1
Proletarian Unity Party	37,573	1.2	1
Proletarian Democracy	36,823	1.2	-
Struggle List	5,780	0.2	-
Civic Alliance	3,863	0.1	-
Revolutionary Socialist League	2,140	0.1	-
Total	3,122,426	100.0	60

Source: Ministry of the Interior
