= 2005 Lazio regional election =

- 3–4 April 2005

All 70 seats to the Regional Council of Lazio
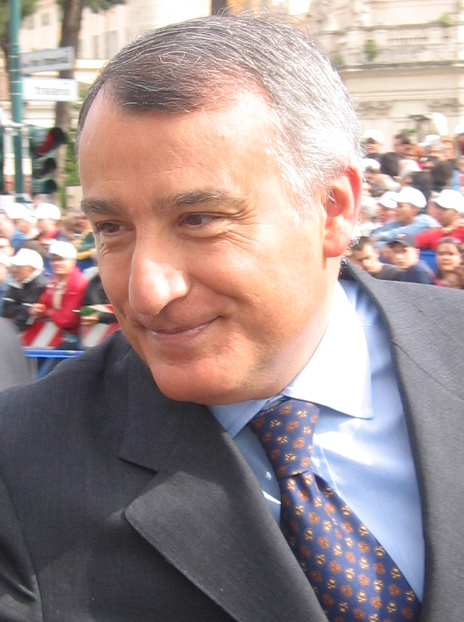

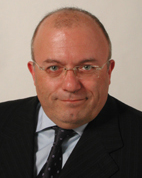
	Majority party	Minority party
Leader	Piero Marrazzo	Francesco Storace
Party	Independent	National Alliance
Alliance	The Union	House of Freedoms
Last election	22 seats, 46,0%	38 seats, 51,3%
Seats won	42	28
Seat change	▲20	▼10
Popular vote	1,631,501	1,524,712
Percentage	50.7%	47.4%
Swing	▲4.7%	▼3.1%
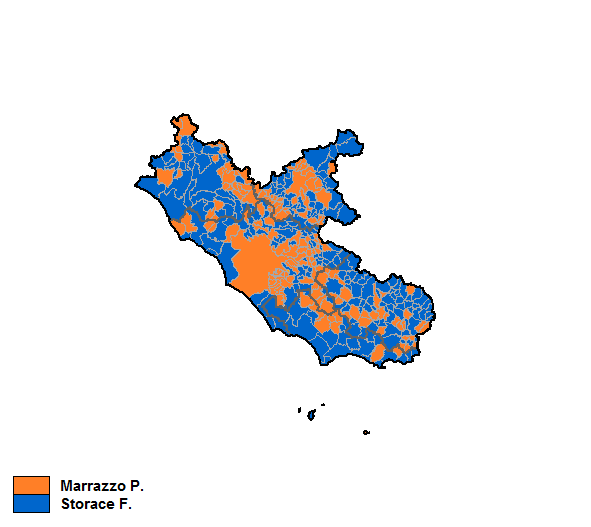
President of Lazio before election
Francesco Storace
House of Freedoms
President of Lazio
Piero Marrazzo
The Olive Tree

The Lazio regional election of 2005 took place on 3–4 April 2005.

Piero Marrazzo (Independent of The Union) defeated incumbent Francesco Storace (AN, House of Freedoms).

The defeat in Lazio for House of Freedoms was especially important as the centre-right expected to maintain control of the Region. Storace, a leading member in the centre-right, was subsequently granted the status of Minister of Public Health in Berlusconi III Cabinet.

During the electoral campaign, Storace came out with factual evidence that Alessandra Mussolini's Social Alternative had added fake signatures to real ones to reach the minimum number needed to present a list. However, to demonstrate this, he had someone "hack" into the database of the municipality of Rome in order to verify the signatures: he was therefore nicknamed "Storhacker" by Mussolini. It also appeared that someone spied on the centre-left candidate Marrazzo. Storace however denied all the charges.

== Results ==
3–4 April 2005 Lazio regional election results
Candidates	Votes	%	Seats	Parties	Votes	%	Seats
Piero Marrazzo	1,631,501	50.69	14				
Piero Marrazzo	1,631,501	50.69	14	The Olive Tree	748,756	27.04	16
Piero Marrazzo	1,631,501	50.69	14	Marrazzo List	186,740	6.74	4
Piero Marrazzo	1,631,501	50.69	14	Communist Refoundation Party	162,775	5.88	3
Piero Marrazzo	1,631,501	50.69	14	Federation of the Greens	73,045	2.64	2
Piero Marrazzo	1,631,501	50.69	14	Party of Italian Communists	64,676	2.34	1
Piero Marrazzo	1,631,501	50.69	14	Union of Democrats for Europe	46,243	1.67	1
Piero Marrazzo	1,631,501	50.69	14	Italy of Values	28,600	1.03	1
Piero Marrazzo	1,631,501	50.69	14	United Consumers	18,163	0.66	–
Piero Marrazzo	1,631,501	50.69	14	Forza Roma	10,336	0.37	–
Piero Marrazzo	1,631,501	50.69	14	Avanti Lazio	3,285	0.12	–
Piero Marrazzo	1,631,501	50.69	14	Total	1,342,619	48.49	28
Francesco Storace	1,524,712	47.37	1				
Francesco Storace	1,524,712	47.37	1	National Alliance	468,679	16.93	10
Francesco Storace	1,524,712	47.37	1	Forza Italia	425,128	15.35	9
Francesco Storace	1,524,712	47.37	1	Union of Christian and Centre Democrats	217,390	7.85	4
Francesco Storace	1,524,712	47.37	1	Storace List	195,356	7.05	4
Francesco Storace	1,524,712	47.37	1	Socialist Party – New PSI	30,429	1.10	–
Francesco Storace	1,524,712	47.37	1	The Clover	15,763	0.57	–
Francesco Storace	1,524,712	47.37	1	Social Idea Movement	12,611	0.46	–
Francesco Storace	1,524,712	47.37	1	Republican Party–Liberal Party	11,763	0.42	–
Francesco Storace	1,524,712	47.37	1	Pensioners' Party	7,788	0.28	–
Francesco Storace	1,524,712	47.37	1	Consumers' List	4,207	0.15	–
Francesco Storace	1,524,712	47.37	1	Democratic Constituent	2,915	0.11	–
Francesco Storace	1,524,712	47.37	1	Total	1,392,029	50.27	27
Alessandra Mussolini	62,498	1.94	–				
Alessandra Mussolini	62,498	1.94	–	Social Alternative	32,541	1.18	–
Alessandra Mussolini	62,498	1.94	–	Four-leaf Clover List	1,908	0.07	–
Alessandra Mussolini	62,498	1.94	–	Total	34,449	1.24	–
Total candidates	3,218,711	100.00	15	Total parties	2,769,097	100.00	55
Source: Ministry of the Interior
