= 2010 Lazio regional election =

- 28–29 March 2010

All 71 seats to the Regional Council of Lazio
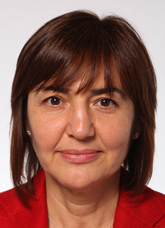

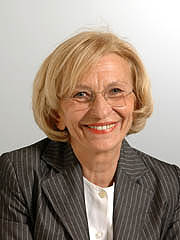
	Majority party	Minority party
Leader	Renata Polverini	Emma Bonino
Party	People of Freedom	Radicals
Alliance	Centre-right	Centre-left
Seats won	45	29
Seat change	▲17	▼13
Popular vote	1,409,025	1,331,375
Percentage	51.1%	48.3%
Swing	▲3.7%	▼2.3%
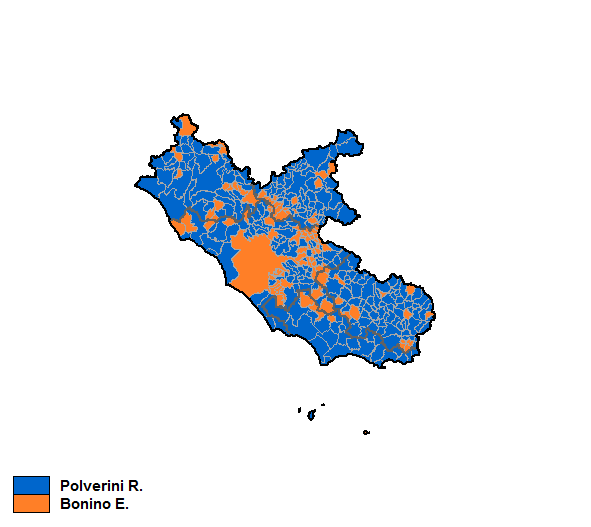
President of Lazio before election
Piero Marrazzo
Democratic Party
President of Lazio
Renata Polverini
People of Freedom

The Lazio regional election of 2010 took place in Lazio, Italy, on 28–29 March 2010.

Piero Marrazzo of the Democratic Party (PD), who was elected President in 2005, seemed a strong candidate for the centre-left in 2010, being the most popular of the possible candidates and the winner in most head-to-head contests with leading centre-right figures. However, an abrupt scandal invested him in October 2009 and finally led to his dramatic resignation.

After that, the candidate of The People of Freedom (PdL) seemed a shoo-in for victory. As Lazio had been a traditional stronghold of Fini's National Alliance party, that merged into the PdL as junior partner of Berlusconi's Forza Italia in 2007, Renata Polverini, supported by Gianfranco Fini, was chosen. Polverini, a woman, was a strange choice for a centre-right party as she was the respected leader of the General Labour Union (UGL), a trade union close to the former National Alliance but independent from it, and a self-proclaimed "socialist", so that she was praised by left-wingers, including the popular newspaper Il Fatto Quotidiano, and criticized by a right-wing newspaper, Il Giornale, that refused to endorse her.

After that, the list of the PdL was disqualified from participating in the election in the Province of Rome, that accounted for four-fifths of the total electorate of Lazio, the election was fairly uncertain, with Bonino in the lead according to some opinion polls.

Despite this, on election day, Polverini beat Bonino in hard-fought battle thanks to a 3.7% swing.

== Results ==
28–29 March 2010 Lazio regional election results
Candidates	Votes	%	Seats	Parties	Votes	%	Seats
Renata Polverini	1,409,025	51.14	15				
Renata Polverini	1,409,025	51.14	15	Polverini List	646,774	26.36	15
Renata Polverini	1,409,025	51.14	15	The People of Freedom	291,199	11.87	7
Renata Polverini	1,409,025	51.14	15	Union of the Centre	150,293	6.13	3
Renata Polverini	1,409,025	51.14	15	The Right	97,186	3.96	2
Renata Polverini	1,409,025	51.14	15	UDEUR	21,120	0.86	–
Renata Polverini	1,409,025	51.14	15	Alliance of the Centre	17,375	0.71	–
Renata Polverini	1,409,025	51.14	15	Network Liberal Sgarbi	15,537	0.63	–
Renata Polverini	1,409,025	51.14	15	The People of Life – The Voice of Consumers	12,531	0.51	–
Renata Polverini	1,409,025	51.14	15	Pensioners' Party	8,079	0.33	–
Renata Polverini	1,409,025	51.14	15	Total	1,260,094	51.37	27
Emma Bonino	1,331,375	48.32	1				
Emma Bonino	1,331,375	48.32	1	Democratic Party	645,187	26.30	15
Emma Bonino	1,331,375	48.32	1	Italy of Values	211,561	8.62	5
Emma Bonino	1,331,375	48.32	1	Bonino-Pannella List	80,982	3.30	2
Emma Bonino	1,331,375	48.32	1	Left Ecology Freedom	77,134	3.14	2
Emma Bonino	1,331,375	48.32	1	Federation of the Left	67,386	2.75	1
Emma Bonino	1,331,375	48.32	1	Citizens for Bonino	40,097	1.63	1
Emma Bonino	1,331,375	48.32	1	Italian Socialist Party	33,160	1.35	1
Emma Bonino	1,331,375	48.32	1	Federation of the Greens	29,725	1.21	1
Emma Bonino	1,331,375	48.32	1	Total	1,185,232	48.31	28
Marzia Marzoli	14,685	0.53	–	Citizens' Network	7,860	0.32	–
Total candidates	2,755,085	100.00	16	Total parties	2,453,186	100.00	55
Source: Ministry of the Interior
