= Francesco Storace =

Italian politician (born 1959)

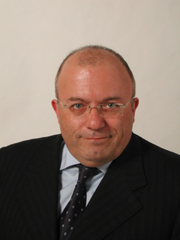

Minister of Health
- In office 23 April 2005 – 10 March 2006
- Prime Minister: Silvio Berlusconi
- Preceded by: Girolamo Sirchia
- Succeeded by: Silvio Berlusconi

President of Lazio
- In office 12 May 2000 – 2 May 2005
- Preceded by: Piero Badaloni
- Succeeded by: Piero Marrazzo

Member of the Senate of the Republic
- In office 28 April 2006 – 28 April 2008

Member of the Chamber of Deputies
- In office 15 April 1994 – 30 May 2000

Personal details
- Born: 25 January 1959 (age 67) Cassino, Italy
- Party: MSI (1980s–1995); AN (1995–2007); LD (2007–2017); MNS (2017–2018); Independent (since 2018)
- Height: 1.74 m (5 ft 9 in)
- Profession: Politician, journalist

Francesco Storace (Italian pronunciation: [franˈtʃesko stoˈraːtʃe]; born 25 January 1959) is an Italian politician and journalist.

== Biography ==
Born in Cassino, in the Lazio region, Storace began his career at the right-wing newspaper Il Secolo d'Italia until entering the ranks of the Italian Social Movement (MSI), a neo-fascist party, and later of National Alliance (AN), a post-fascist party that repudiated of extremism. He was elected to the Italian Chamber of Deputies for the first time in 1994. At the time, he was the spokesman of Gianfranco Fini. From 1996 to 2000, he was chairman of the bicameral Commission supervising the RAI.

In April 2000, Storace was elected president of Lazio. Among the measures taken by Storace, there was the opening of Sant'Andrea hospital and other health centres. His health management of Lazio won praise for Giulio Andreotti and some members of the Vatican curia. In 2005, he failed the re-election, defeated by the centre-left candidate Piero Marrazzo. He was subsequently named Minister of Health in the Berlusconi III Cabinet.

In March 2006, Storace was involved in the Laziogate scandal, leading to his resignation from the government. He was suspected to have illegally exploited informatics mean to investigate the memberships of the new party founded by Alessandra Mussolini, a former member of AN who was one of his rivals in the 2005 Lazio regional election. In October 2012, Storace was acquitted because "the crime does not exist". On 10 April 2006, he was elected to the Italian Senate in Lazio, where he was at the head of the party list.

On 3 July 2007, after having continually criticized the leadership of Fini at least since 2005, Storace finally left AN on 16 November 2007. One of the motivations of the criticism of Fini and AN was what Storace saw as the repudiation of the values of the right. In November 2007, he founded his brand new national-conservative party named The Right.

Storace ran for president in the 2013 Lazio regional election but got 29.3% of the vote and was beaten by Nicola Zingaretti. On 21 November 2018, Storace stipulated a federative agreement with Giorgia Meloni in view of the European elections and with the aim of creating an alternative conservative and sovereign movement to the League. He later dropped out of politics and returned to journalism. On 23 January 2019, he was appointed editor of the online newspaper Il Secolo d'Italia. He is subsequently became deputy editor of the newspaper Il Tempo.
