= 1975 Lazio regional election =

The regional election of 1975 took place on 15 June 1975. Ten new seats were added to the Regional Council following the 1971 census.

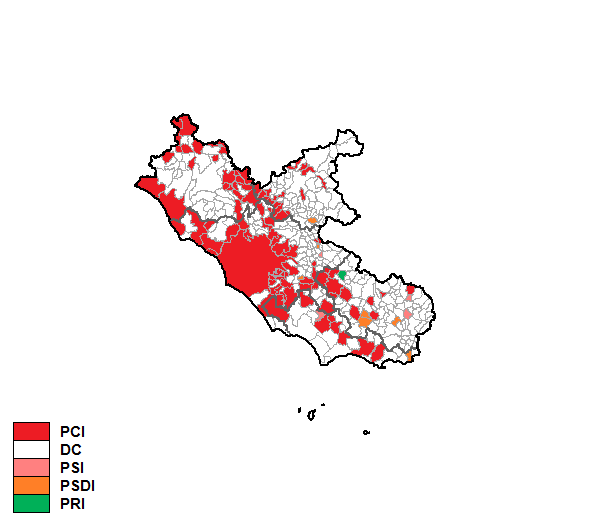
Largest party by municipality

== Events ==
Christian Democracy was narrowly behind the Italian Communist Party. After the election Roberto Palleschi, a Socialist became President of the Region with the support of the Italian Communist Party (Frontism).

In 1976 Palleschi was replaced by Communist Maurizio Ferrara, to whom Giulio Santarelli, a Socialist, succeeded in 1977.

== Results ==
Parties	votes	votes (%)	seats
Italian Communist Party	1,041,672	33.5	21
Christian Democracy	980,307	31.5	20
Italian Social Movement	352,578	11.4	6
Italian Socialist Party	302,710	9.7	6
Italian Democratic Socialist Party	190,007	6.1	3
Italian Republican Party	114,589	3.7	2
Italian Liberal Party	77,444	2.5	1
Proletarian Democracy	44,986	1.5	1
Italian Justicialist Party	3,418	0.1	-
Total	3,107,711	100.0	60

Source: Ministry of the Interior
