= Piero Marrazzo =

Italian journalist and politician (born 1958)

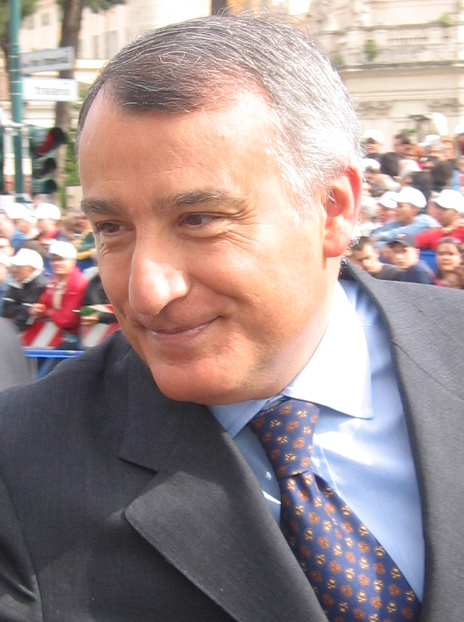

President of Lazio
- In office 2 May 2005 – 27 October 2009
- Deputy: Esterino Montino
- Preceded by: Francesco Storace
- Succeeded by: Renata Polverini

Personal details
- Born: 29 July 1958 (age 68) Rome, Italy
- Party: Democratic Party
- Height: 1.76 m (5 ft 9 in)
- Education: Sapienza University of Rome
- Occupation: Journalist

Piero Marrazzo (born 29 July 1958) is an Italian journalist and politician. He served as the President of Lazio, the region of Italy containing Rome, from 2005 to 2009.

Piero Marrazzo is the son of Giuseppe Marrazzo (a field journalist noted for his investigations on the Mafia) and Italian-American Luigia Spina. He was a political activist during his youth, leading towards reformist socialism, and obtained a degree in jurisprudence. He went on to become a prominent TV journalist, working for twenty years for RAI, on programmes such as TG2 and TG3, heading the Tuscany journalistic department of RAI, working with Giovanni Minoli (on programmes such as "Cronaca in Diretta", "Drugstories", and "Format"), and finally becoming the anchorman for eight consecutive years of "Mi Manda Rai Tre", for which he is most remembered. In November 2004 he left his job to run for presidency of Lazio as the candidate of centre-left coalition L'Unione; he won the April 2005 regional elections attracting 50.7% of votes.

He suspended himself from his role on Saturday 24 October 2009, after 4 carabinieri officers allegedly tried to blackmail him with video footage, purporting to reveal him in a bedroom with a transsexual prostitute, where a limited quantity of cocaine was also present. Marrazzo admitted the meeting and said that the move paved the way for his resignation. In 2018 the four carabinieri officers were found guilty of conspiracy and blackmail.
