= Renata Polverini =

Italian politician and trade unionist (born 1962)

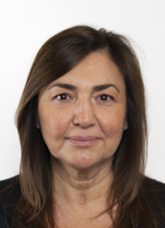

Member of the Chamber of Deputies
- In office 16 March 2013 – 13 October 2022
- Constituency: Lazio 1

President of Lazio
- In office 16 April 2010 – 12 March 2013
- Preceded by: Piero Marrazzo
- Succeeded by: Nicola Zingaretti

General Secretary of UGL
- In office 4 February 2006 – 29 May 2010
- Preceded by: Stefano Cetica
- Succeeded by: Giovanni Centrella

Personal details
- Born: 14 May 1962 (age 63) Rome, Italy
- Party: Forza Italia (2013–2021; since 2021)
- Other political affiliations: The People of Freedom (2009–2013)
- Profession: Trade unioninst, politician

Renata Polverini (born 14 May 1962) is an Italian politician and trade unionist. She was President of the Lazio region and was formerly Secretary General of the General Labour Union (UGL); she resigned on 24 September 2012 after an expense scandal.

== Biography ==
At the end of her studies and after an apprenticeship in the Cisnal Agriculture Trade Union Federation, she became a member of the Confederal press office. After two years, she was assigned by Cisnal to lead the administrative and organizational department.

From 1994 her job became more political, she played a central role in organising the transition of Cisnal to UGL, which happened during the 1996 Congress. She started reforms in terms of representativeness in the public sector and in the reorganization of social assistance services of the Trade Union. In 1998, she entered into the internal structure of the UGL, the Confederal Secretariat. In the same year she became UGL representative within the European Economic and Social Committee. She spent time in between Rome and Brussels and campaigned on improving health and safety in the workplace.

In 1999 she was appointed as Deputy Secretary-General UGL and General Secretary of the Private Services Trade Union Federation. In support of women involved in the organization, she created the UGL Women Coordination. She was involved in major disputes in the national chemical industry (Eni), in the metal workers sector (Fiat and Thyssen Krupp), in public employment, in the transport sector (Railways and Alitalia) and in the private services sector. She worked to reach agreements with the Prodi, D'Alema and Berlusconi governments, and contributed to all the major reforms of labour market (Law nr. 30 of 2003) and pension system, in order to defend employees interests.

In February 2006 she was elected as (with 96.7% of votes) Secretary General of UGL, first woman in Italy to lead a Trade Union confederation.

In late 2009 she brought herself forward as candidate for the presidency of the Lazio Region, in view of the elections of 29 March 2010. She led a centre-right coalition, which was however reduced when its main party, the People of Freedom led by Berlusconi, was excluded from elections in the Province of Rome for some formal errors .

In March 2010 she won the election as president of the Lazio region in a close race against Emma Bonino. Bonino is known as a pro-choice activist, while Polverini was against abortion rights and thus received support from Cardinal Angelo Bagnasco, President of the Italian Episcopal Conference. She resigned on 24 September 2012, after a controversy regarding the personal use of public money at the hand of some members of the coalition that supported her.

In 2013 and 2018 she was elected to the Chamber of Deputies. On 21 January 2021 she became a member of the Mixed Group in the Democratic Centre-Italians in Europe component. On 20 May 2021 she returned to Forza Italia.
