= Regional Council of Lazio =

Legislative organ of Lazio, Italy

Regional Council of Lazio Consiglio Regionale del Lazio
- 12th Legislature
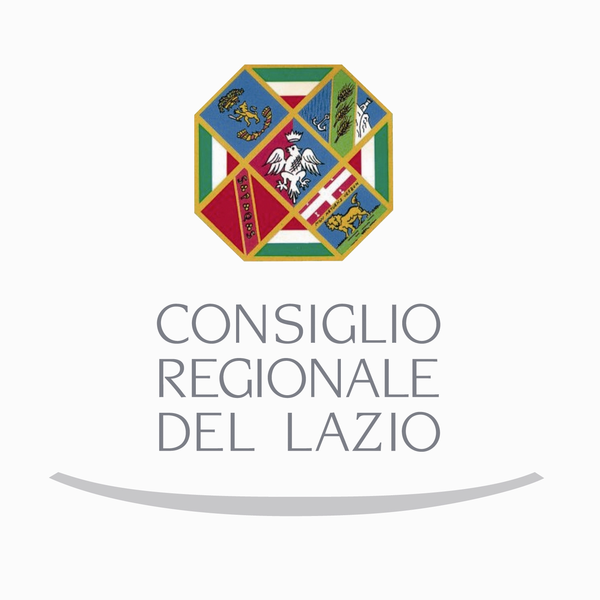

Type
- Type: Regional council Unicameral
- Established: 6 July 1970

Leadership
- President: Antonio Aurigemma, FdI since 13 March 2023

Structure
- Seats: 51
- Political groups: Government (33): FdI (22); FI (7); Rocca List (2); Lega (1); NM (1); Opposition (18): PD (11); M5S (2); IV (2); A (1); VS (1); PP (1)
- Length of term: 5 years

Elections
- Voting system: Party-list semi-proportional representation with majority bonus D'Hondt method
- Last election: 12 February 2023
- Next election: No later than 13 February 2028

Meeting place
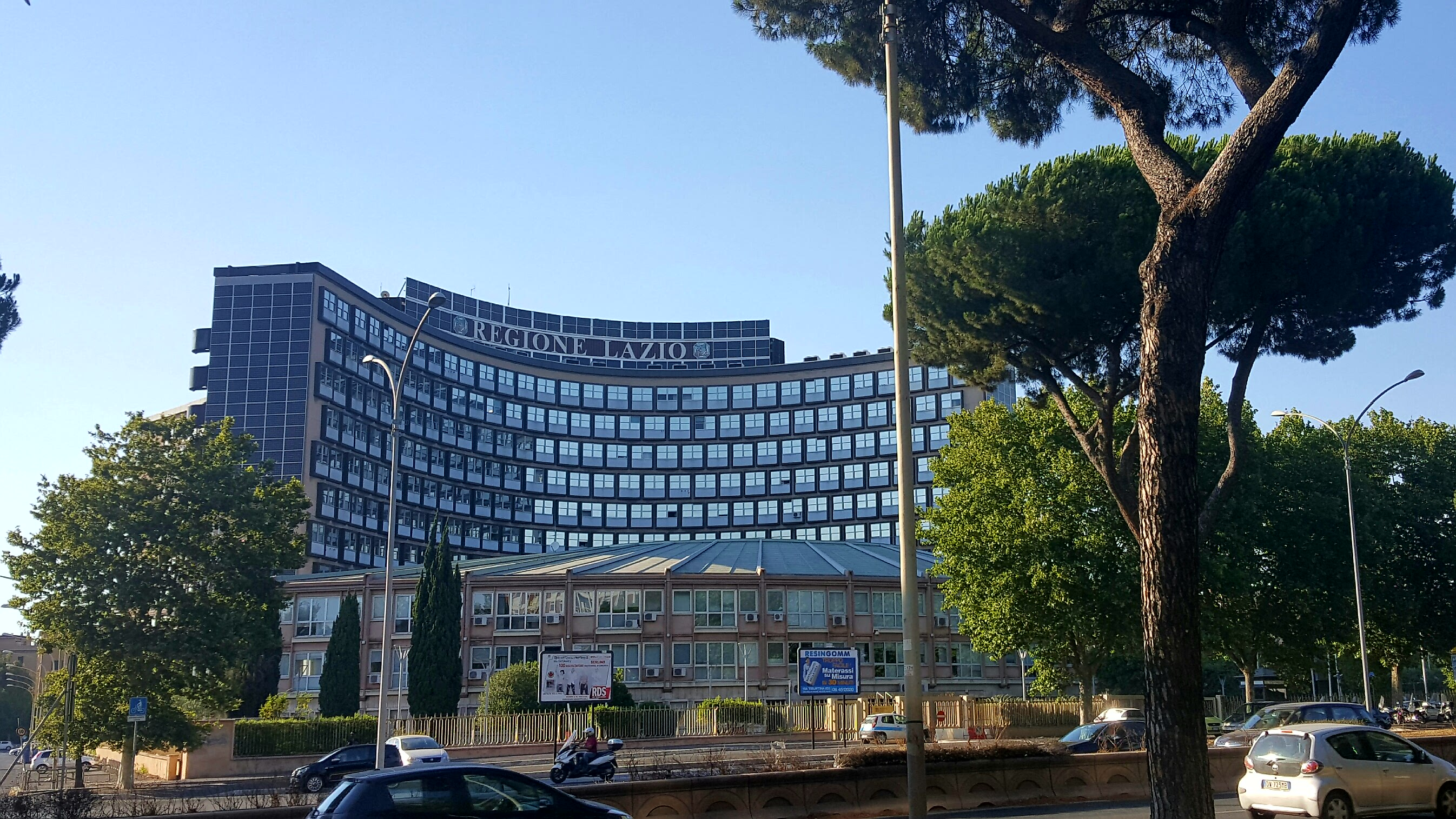
- Palazzo della Regione, Rome

Website
- consiglio.regione.lazio.it

The Regional Council of Lazio (Italian: Consiglio Regionale del Lazio) is the legislative assembly of Lazio.

It was first elected in 1970, when the ordinary regions were instituted, on the basis of the Constitution of Italy of 1948.

== Composition ==
The Regional Council of Lazio is composed of 51 members, of which 49 are elected in provincial constituencies with proportional representation, one is for the candidate for President who comes second, who usually becomes the leader of the opposition in the Council, and one is for the elected president.

The Council is elected for a five-year term, but, if the President suffers a vote of no confidence, resigns or dies, under the simul stabunt vel simul cadent clause (introduced in 1999), also the Council will be dissolved and there will be a snap election.

The Regional Council of Lazio was originally composed of 60 regional councillors. The number of regional councillors increased to 70 in the 2005 regional election. Following the decree-law n. 138 of 13 August 2011, the number of regional councillors was reduced to 50, with an additional seat reserved for the President of the Region.

=== Political groups (2023–2028) ===
The Regional Council of Lazio is currently composed of the following political groups:

| Party | Seats | Status |
|---|---|---|
| Brothers of Italy (FdI) | 22 / 51 | In government |
| Democratic Party (PD) | 11 / 51 | In opposition |
| Forza Italia (FI) | 7 / 51 | In government |
| Rocca for President | 2 / 51 | In government |
| Five Star Movement (M5S) | 2 / 51 | In opposition |
| Italia Viva (IV) | 2 / 51 | In opposition |
| League (Lega) | 1 / 51 | In government |
| Action (A) | 1 / 51 | In opposition |
| Greens and Left (VS) | 1 / 51 | In opposition |
| Progressive Pole (PP) | 1 / 51 | In opposition |
| Mixed Group | 1 / 51 | External support |

By coalition:

| Coalition | Seats | Status |
|---|---|---|
| Centre-right coalition | 33 / 51 | Government |
| Centre-left coalition | 16 / 51 | Opposition |
| Five Star Movement | 2 / 51 | Opposition |

== See also ==
- Regional council
- Politics of Lazio
- President of Lazio
