= President of Lazio =

Head of the government of the Italian region of Lazio

- Flag of Lazio

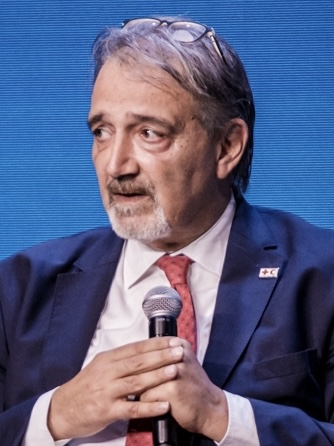
- Incumbent; Francesco Rocca since March 2, 2023
- Term length: Five years, renewable once
- Inaugural holder: Girolamo Mechelli (1970)
- Formation: Italian Constitution
- Website: Region of Lazio

The president of Lazio is the head of government of the Italian region of Lazio. The presidency was established in 1970.

The president was appointed by the Regional Council of Lazio during the first five legislatures. Since 1995, as confirmed by the 1999 constitutional reform, the president is directly elected by popular vote.

== See also ==
- List of presidents of Lazio
