= Opinion polling for the 2013 Italian general election =

In the years running up to the 2013 Italian general election, various organisations carried out opinion polls to gauge voting intention in Italy. Results of such polls are given in this article. The date range for these opinion polls is from January 2012. In late 2012, outgoing Prime Minister Mario Monti declared his intention to support a centrist coalition named With Monti for Italy; opinion polls conducted before December 2012 do not consider this. Poll results are reported at the dates when the fieldwork was done, as opposed to the date of publication; if such date is unknown, the date of publication is given instead. Under the Italian par condicio (equal conditions) law, publication of opinion polls is forbidden in the last two weeks of an electoral campaign.

== Party vote ==
=== Graphical summary ===
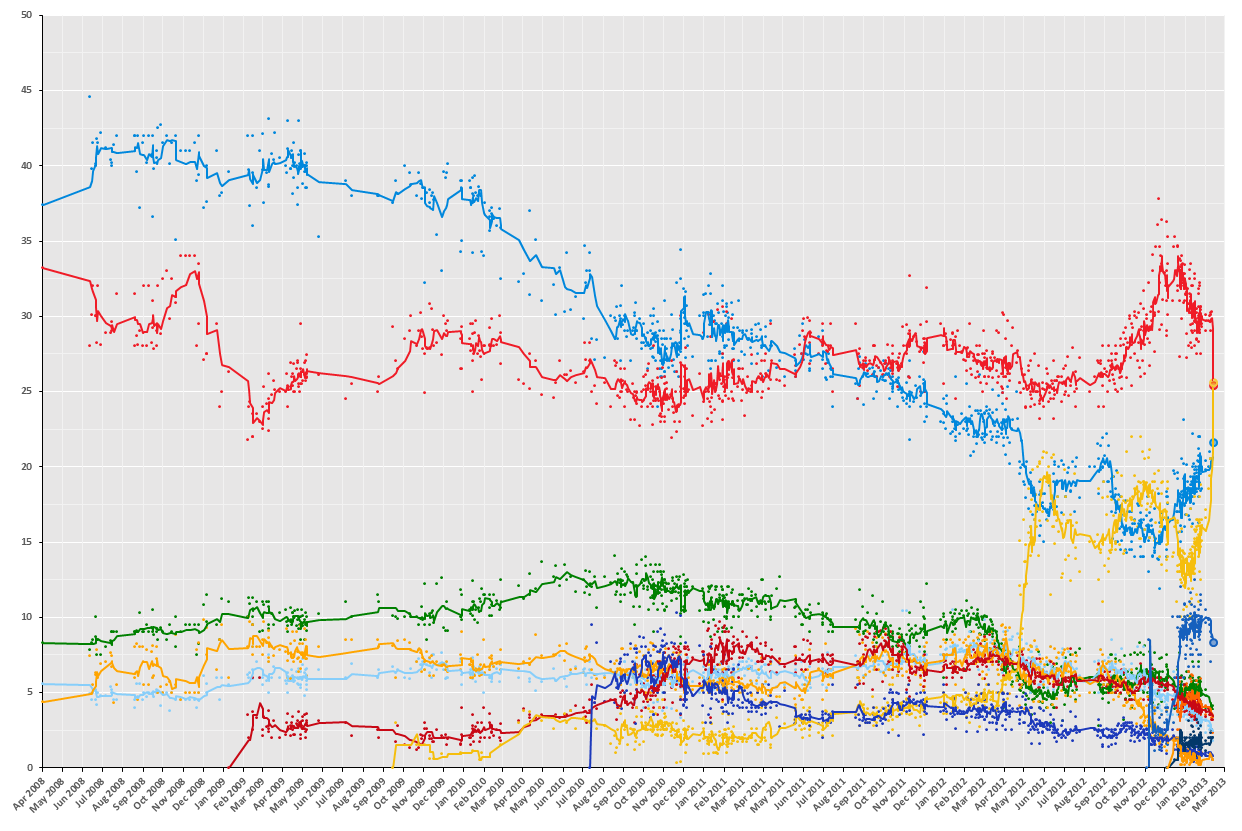
6-point average trend line of poll results from 14 April 2008 to 24 february 2013, with each line corresponding to a political party. PdL PD Lega UDC IdV SEL M5S FLI SC FdI CD RC

Poll results in this section use the date of publication of the survey. Detailed data are usually published in the official website of the Italian government. The publication of opinion polls during the last 15 days of the electoral campaign is forbidden by Italian law.

=== 2013 ===
Date	Polling firm	PdL	PD	LN	UdC	RC	SEL	M5S	FLI	SC	FdI	CD	Oth.	Lead
24–25 Feb 2013	General election	21.6	25.4	4.1	1.8	2.3	3.2	25.6	0.5	8.3	2.0	0.5	4.7	0.2
23 Feb	Ipsos	20.2	30.3	4.0	2.5	3.3	3.2	20.0	0.7	8.7	2.5		4.6	10.1
22 Feb	Ipsos	20.0	30.1	3.8	2.7	3.5	3.6	20.5	0.8	9.0	2.3		3.7	9.6
21 Feb	Ipsos	20.5	30.2	3.7	2.6	3.5	3.7	20.0	0.9	9.0	2.0		3.9	9.7
20–21 Feb	EMG	20.5	29.0	4.0	2.5	3.5	3.5	20.5	1.0	7.0	2.0		6.5	8.5
20 Feb	Ipsos	21.0	30.0	3.8	2.5	4.0	3.5	19.4	1.0	9.5	1.5		3.8	9.0
19 Feb	Ipsos	20.0	29.7	4.0	2.8	4.0	3.9	18.5	1.0	9.8	2.0		4.3	9.7
14 Feb	Ipsos	19.8	29.0	4.0	3.1	4.1	3.8	17.1	0.8	10.5	1.8		6.0	9.2
13–14 Feb	EMG	20.4	30.1	5.2	2.3	3.5	3.4	16.6	1.0	9.6	1.1		6.8	9.7
8 Feb	IPR	20.0	29.5	4.2	3.3	4.2	3.7	16.5	0.8	10.0	1.3	1.0	5.5	9.5
8 Feb	TP	18.5	29.3	5.1	3.9	4.2	3.7	15.1	0.9	10.0	2.0		7.3	10.8
7 Feb	Ipsos	20.3	30.6	4.4	3.2	3.7	3.9	15.9	0.8	10.8	2.3		4.1	10.3
7 Feb	SWG	19.5	29.5	5.2	2.7	4.1	3.6	18.8	1.7	9.0	1.0	0.3	4.6	10.0
6–7 Feb	EMG	19.9	30.0	4.9	2.7	3.5	4.2	16.0	1.4	10.0	1.2		6.2	10.1
6–7 Feb	Quorum	20.1	29.9	4.8	3.1	3.9	3.8	14.7	0.9	9.9	1.8		7.1	9.8
6–7 Feb	Lorien	20.1	30.6	5.7	3.2	4.3	4.0	15.0	0.3	9.8	1.7	0.2	5.1	10.5
6 Feb	Ipsos	20.4	30.4	4.4	3.3	3.7	3.8	15.8	0.9	11.1	2.1		4.1	10.0
4–6 Feb	Demos&Pi	20.4	29.9	5.0	3.5	4.0	3.7	16.0	1.0	11.5			5.0	9.5
4–6 Feb	SpinCon	18.4	27.5	5.1	2.9	5.9	4.1	12.5	0.8	7.5	2.8	0.4	12.1	9.1
5 Feb	Piepoli	22.0	32.0	6.0	3.0	3.5	4.5	13.0	0.5	9.5	1.5	0.5	4.0	10.0
5 Feb	Tecnè	20.7	28.9	5.5	3.3	5.2	3.7	16.3	0.8	8.5			7.1	8.2
4–5 Feb	ISPO	22.0	32.2	5.4	3.0	4.2	3.5	14.3	0.6	9.3	1.0		4.5	10.2
4–5 Feb	SWG	18.9	28.9	5.3	3.0	4.9	3.9	18.0	1.5	8.8	1.7	0.4	4.7	10.0
3–5 Feb	Demopolis	20.0	29.1	4.9	3.8	4.1	4.2	16.5	1.1	9.5			6.8	9.1
4 Feb	Ipsos	18.5	31.8	4.9	3.9	4.3	4.2	14.5	1.0	10.1	2.6		4.2	13.3
4 Feb	IPR	20.0	30.0	4.3	3.3	4.5	3.7	15.5	1.0	9.7	1.3	1.0	5.7	10.0
4 Feb	Datamonitor	19.0	29.0	5.2	3.5	4.9	4.1	14.0	1.2	9.6	1.7	0.4	7.4	10.0
4 Feb	Piepoli	18.0	31.5	7.0	3.5	4.0	4.5	11.0	1.0	10.5	2.0	1.0	6.0	13.5
4 Feb	Tecnè	20.7	29.2	5.8	3.4	4.9	3.5	16.1	0.9	8.7			6.8	8.5
4 Feb	ISPO	21.2	29.9	5.2	2.0	3.9	4.2	16.4	1.0	9.5	1.5		5.2	8.7
1–3 Feb	Euromedia	22.0	29.8	5.2	3.5	3.7	3.7	14.6	0.7	7.5	1.9		7.4	7.8
1–3 Feb	Lorien	20.3	30.6	6.0	3.2	4.7	4.4	14.8	0.4	9.8	1.4	0.2	4.2	10.3
31 Jan–3 Feb	ScenariPolitici	16.3	28.3	5.7	2.9	5.5	4.5	14.9	0.6	6.7	3.0	0.8	10.8	12.0
2 Feb	Tecnè	20.4	29.5	5.4	3.5	5.1	3.0	16.5	0.7	9.0			6.9	9.1
1 Feb	TP	18.3	28.4	4.9	3.8	5.0	3.7	15.8	0.9	10.1	2.0		7.1	10.1
31 Jan–1 Feb	EMG	19.6	30.2	4.8	2.8	4.6	4.6	14.5	1.7	10.1	0.8		6.3	10.6
30 Jan–1 Feb	Demopolis	19.0	28.5	5.1	4.0	4.3	4.2	16.5	1.4	10.0			7.0	9.5
31 Jan	Tecnè	19.8	30.5	5.5	3.5	4.6	3.3	16.0	0.8	9.0			7.0	10.7
29–31 Jan	SpinCon	18.5	27.5	5.4	3.1	5.8	4.1	11.5	0.6	7.8	3.2	0.3	12.2	9.0
30 Jan	Tecnè	20.0	29.8	5.8	3.6	4.7	3.3	15.7	0.7	9.5			6.9	9.8
29 Jan	Tecnè	19.8	29.7	5.5	3.7	4.8	3.5	15.2	0.8	9.1			7.9	9.9
29 Jan	Datamonitor	18.5	30.1	5.5	3.8	4.7	4.5	13.2	1.2	9.0	1.6	0.5	7.4	11.6
29 Jan	ISPO	19.1	30.8	4.9	3.8	4.6	4.9	13.6	1.1	9.7	2.0		5.5	11.7
28–29 Jan	SWG	19.3	28.0	4.9	3.4	5.0	4.0	18.0	1.4	9.4	1.4	0.5	4.7	8.7
28–29 Jan	Quorum	19.5	29.0	4.9	3.6	4.2	3.9	14.9	1.3	10.2	1.3		7.2	9.5
28 Jan	Tecnè	19.1	29.9	5.2	3.8	4.6	3.4	15.8	0.7	9.6			7.9	10.8
28 Jan	Ipsos	18.2	32.5	5.2	3.6	4.8	4.5	13.6	1.1	10.7	1.4		4.4	14.3
28 Jan	IPR	18.5	30.5	4.5	3.3	4.7	3.9	14.6	1.2	10.3	1.3	1.0	6.2	12.0
28 Jan	TP	18.3	29.6	5.0	3.8	4.3	4.2	15.0	1.0	9.5	2.1	0.7	6.5	11.3
22–28 Jan	Demos&Pi	19.2	32.8	4.1	4.4	4.2	3.2	12.9	0.8	12.5			5.9	13.6
27 Jan	ISPO	18.5	30.8	4.9	3.8	4.8	4.9	13.6	1.1	9.5	1.5		6.6	12.3
25–27 Jan	Lorien	20.2	30.7	5.8	3.5	4.5	4.5	13.9	0.4	10.1	1.5	0.5	4.4	10.5
25–27 Jan	Bidimedia	17.5	30.7	4.9	4.5	4.4	4.9	13.8	1.2	6.7	2.4	1.0	8.0	13.2
26 Jan	Tecnè	18.9	30.2	5.2	3.7	4.8	3.8	14.7	0.9	9.6			8.2	11.3
25–26 Jan	Euromedia	22.2	29.5	5.5	3.9	3.5	4.1	13.1	0.8	8.2	1.8		6.6	7.3
24–26 Jan	ScenariPolitici	16.2	28.9	6.0	3.2	6.1	4.4	11.9	0.9	7.5	2.7	1.0	11.2	12.7
25 Jan	Piepoli	18.0	32.0	7.0	4.0	4.0	5.0	10.0	1.0	10.0	2.0	1.0	6.0	14.0
24–25 Jan	EMG	20.0	30.7	4.7	3.1	5.0	4.7	13.5	1.8	9.6	0.7		6.2	10.7
21–25 Jan	Quorum	18.3	30.2	4.6	3.9	4.5	4.0	14.2	0.9	9.8	1.4		8.2	11.9
24 Jan	Tecnè	18.5	30.5	5.2	3.9	4.7	3.8	14.3	1.1	9.9	1.0		7.1	12.0
22–24 Jan	SpinCon	19.0	27.9	5.7	3.1	6.2	3.8	11.2	0.7	8.4	2.8	0.5	10.7	8.9
22–24 Jan	Demopolis	18.0	29.0	5.5	4.2	4.7	4.2	16.0	1.1	9.5			7.8	11.0
21–24 Jan	Lorien	18.8	32.0	5.5	3.6	5.7	3.4	13.0	1.0	10.8	1.8		4.4	13.2
23 Jan	Tecnè	18.8	30.7	5.3	3.7	4.4	3.7	14.0	1.1	10.2			8.1	11.9
22–23 Jan	SWG	17.2	29.4	5.3	4.2	5.4	4.4	17.2	1.1	7.5	1.5	0.3	6.5	12.2
22 Jan	Tecnè	18.4	30.2	5.4	4.0	4.7	3.9	14.5	1.2	9.9			7.8	11.8
22 Jan	Datamonitor	18.5	31.3	5.5	4.0	4.2	4.7	12.8	1.2	8.5	1.5	0.5	7.3	12.8
18–22 Jan	SpinCon	19.3	28.2	6.1	3.3	5.9	3.8	10.9	0.8	7.9	2.2	0.5	11.1	8.9
17–22 Jan	Demos&Pi	18.1	33.5	4.5	3.6	4.5	4.0	13.0	1.0	11.6			6.2	15.4
21 Jan	Tecnè	18.2	30.5	5.2	4.2	4.6	4.3	14.2	1.1	9.9			7.8	12.3
21 Jan	Ipsos	17.8	33.1	5.3	3.8	4.6	4.8	12.8	1.2	11.0	1.2	0.2	4.2	15.3
21 Jan	IPR	18.5	31.5	5.0	3.5	4.3	3.5	13.3	1.3	9.5	1.0	1.0	7.6	13.0
21 Jan	Piepoli	16.5	32.5	6.0	4.0	4.0	5.0	10.0	1.0	9.0	2.0	1.0	9.0	16.0
19 Jan	Tecnè	17.9	30.8	5.3	4.3	4.8	4.1	14.0	1.1	9.8			7.9	12.9
16–19 Jan	ScenariPolitici	16.7	28.0	6.4	3.7	6.4	4.3	11.9	1.0	6.7	3.1	1.0	10.8	11.3
17–18 Jan	EMG	19.0	31.8	4.7	3.5	4.6	4.1	12.8	1.6	10.1	0.9	1.2	5.7	12.8
17 Jan	Tecnè	18.5	31.6	4.7	4.4	4.3	4.4	13.9	1.1	9.6			7.5	13.1
16–17 Jan	ISPO	18.5	31.8	4.9	3.8	4.6	4.9	13.6	1.1	9.0	1.1		6.7	13.3
16 Jan	Tecnè	18.1	31.5	4.9	4.4	4.5	4.4	13.6	1.1	9.8			7.7	13.4
15–16 Jan	SWG	17.7	28.8	5.4	4.1	5.4	3.8	16.8	1.0	8.6	1.5	0.4	6.5	11.1
14–16 Jan	SpinCon	20.1	27.2	6.4	3.2	5.6	4.1	10.7	0.9	8.1	2.0	0.3	11.4	7.1
15 Jan	Tecnè	18.5	31.4	4.7	4.5	4.2	4.5	13.8	1.2	9.7			7.5	12.9
15 Jan	Datamonitor	18.0	31.5	5.5	4.2	4.7	5.0	12.8	1.3	7.5	1.5	0.5	7.5	13.5
14–15 Jan	Bidimedia	16.8	31.9	5.1	4.0	5.0	4.7	13.6	1.1	7.2	1.9	1.0	7.7	15.1
14 Jan	Tecnè	18.9	31.8	4.6	4.3	4.1	4.5	14.2	1.1	9.4			7.1	12.9
14 Jan	Piepoli	16.0	32.5	6.0	4.0	4.0	5.5	10.0	1.0	9.0	2.0	1.0	9.0	16.5
14 Jan	Ipsos	17.4	33.4	5.0	4.0	4.8	4.9	12.5	1.1	10.9	1.4	0.2	4.4	16.0
14 Jan	IPR	18.0	31.0	5.0	3.5	4.0	4.0	12.0	1.5	10.0	1.5	1.5	8.0	13.0
12–14 Jan	Lorien	17.5	32.8	5.9	3.8	5.4	3.7	12.5	1.0	10.8	1.8		4.8	15.3
12 Jan	Tecnè	19.2	32.0	4.4	4.2	4.3	4.4	14.3	1.0	9.3			6.9	12.8
11–12 Jan	Euromedia	23.1	32.8	5.5	4.0	4.0	4.5	10.5	1.0	6.0		1.0	7.6	9.7
11 Jan	ISPO	20.2	30.9	4.6	4.9	4.4	4.4	12.6	1.3	9.3	1.1	0.5	5.8	10.7
11 Jan	EMG	18.4	32.4	5.0	3.4	5.2	4.1	12.1	1.6	9.8	1.1	0.9	6.0	14.0
10 Jan	Tecnè	18.1	33.5	4.2	4.5	4.0	4.6	14.4	1.2	9.4			6.1	15.4
10 Jan	ISPO	17.5	32.2	4.4	4.1	4.0	4.4	13.2	1.2	9.8	1.1	0.5	7.6	14.7
9 Jan	Tecnè	17.9	33.1	4.2		4.4	4.8	14.0					21.6	15.2
7–9 Jan	SWG	15.7	29.8	6.1	4.0	4.5	4.4	15.9	1.0	8.8	1.5	0.7	7.6	13.9
8 Jan	Tecnè	18.3	34.0	3.9	4.8	3.7	4.7	14.1	1.2	9.1			6.2	15.7
7–8 Jan	Euromedia	20.5	33.4	5.7	4.0	4.4	4.2	12.3	1.0	5.5	1.8	0.2	7.0	12.9
7 Jan	Tecnè	18.1	33.7	4.2	4.6	4.1	4.5	14.4	1.3	9.2			5.9	15.6
7 Jan	Piepoli	15.0	33.0	6.0	5.0	4.0	6.0	10.0	1.0	8.0	2.0	1.0	9.0	18.0
7 Jan	Ipsos	16.1	33.3	4.0	4.3	5.5	5.5	12.5	1.3	12.0	1.6	0.2	3.7	17.2
6 Jan	ISPO	18.0	33.0	6.0	4.0	2.5	4.0	13.5	1.0	9.0		1.5	7.5	15.0
3–6 Jan	ScenariPolitici	14.1	27.3	7.6	3.8	5.7	4.2	13.0	1.3	8.0	3.5	0.8	10.7	13.2
5 Jan	IPR	17.0	31.0	5.0	4.0	2.0	5.0	13.0	2.0	10.0	1.5	2.0	7.5	14.0
5 Jan	Tecnè	18.2	33.8	4.5	4.4	3.4	4.6	15.7	1.2	8.7			5.5	15.6
3 Jan	Tecnè	19.2	34.6	4.0	4.5	3.8	4.2	16.4	1.2	6.7			5.4	15.4
3 Jan	IPR	17.0	32.0	5.0	3.5	2.5	5.0	13.0	1.5	10.0			10.5	15.0
2 Jan	Tecnè	19.6	34.7	4.1	4.6	3.7	4.2	16.3	1.2	6.2			5.4	15.1
2 Jan	Lorien	15.6	31.7	6.5	3.9	4.3	4.2	13.4	1.4	9.3	1.9	0.6	7.2	16.1
1 Jan	Piepoli	17.0	33.0	6.0	6.0	5.0	6.0	11.0	2.0	4.0		2.0	8.0	16.0

=== 2012 ===
Date	Polling firm	PdL	PD	LN	UdC	IdV	SEL	M5S	FLI	VTR	FdI	CD	Oth.	Lead
29 Dec	Tecnè	19.5	35.3	3.9	4.8	3.8	4.1	16.0	1.2	6.0	0.5	1.5	3.4	15.8
22–28 Dec	CISE	19.7	34.6	5.6	6.4	1.8	5.2	14.3	2.1	3.0			7.3	14.9
26 Dec	IPR	16.5	31.0	5.5	3.5	2.0	4.5	14.0	2.5	10.0		2.0	8.5	14.5
19 Dec	Piepoli	18.0	33.5	6.5	6.0	2.0	6.0	14.0				Did not exist	14.0	15.5
19 Dec	IPR	16.0	32.0	5.5	3.5	2.0	5.5	16.5	2.5	4.0		Did not exist	12.5	15.5
19 Dec	ISPO	17.5	35.3	6.2	4.7	1.6	5.2	17.6	1.8	1.5		Did not exist	8.6	17.7
18–19 Dec	SWG	15.8	30.1	6.2	4.9	1.7	5.4	18.5	1.7	2.8		Did not exist	12.9	11.6
16–19 Dec	Demopolis	16.0	32.0	5.2	6.1	2.0	6.0	19.0	1.9	4.0		Did not exist	7.8	13.0
17 Dec	Ipsos	18.0	36.3	4.6	5.6	1.9	5.8	13.8	1.8	3.2		Did not exist	9.0	18.3
17 Dec	IPR	16.0	33.0	5.5	4.5	2.0	5.5	16.5	2.5			Did not exist	14.5	16.5
15–17 Dec	Lorien	14.0	31.0	6.7	4.5	3.8	6.0	14.8	1.9	2.0	Did not exist	Did not exist	15.3	14.0
14–17 Dec	Euromedia	18.3	29.0	6.8	4.0	1.1	5.5	17.0	2.0	3.7	Did not exist	Did not exist	12.6	10.7
14–17 Dec	SpinCon	14.5	28.7	7.5	4.2	1.6	5.5	13.1	0.9	1.6	Did not exist	Did not exist	22.4	14.2
15 Dec	Datamonitor	15.8	32.0	5.3	4.6	2.0	5.5	17.0	2.0	4.0	Did not exist	Did not exist	11.8	15.0
13–14 Dec	EMG	16.0	32.9	5.8	4.4	1.4	5.1	16.6	2.5	3.0	Did not exist	Did not exist	12.3	16.3
10–11 Dec	SWG	16.5	31.1	6.4	5.4	2.0	5.5	19.0	1.9	1.7	Did not exist	Did not exist	10.5	12.1
10 Dec	Ipsos	15.5	36.4	4.4	5.5	2.2	5.6	18.2	1.9	3.5	Did not exist	Did not exist	6.8	18.2
10 Dec	ISPO	16.9	33.1	5.9	5.2	3.5	5.4	18.9	1.5	2.1	Did not exist	Did not exist	7.5	14.2
10 Dec	IPR	15.0	33.5	5.5	4.5	2.0	5.5	17.0	2.5		Did not exist	Did not exist	14.5	16.5
6–10 Dec	SpinCon	15.6	29.4	7.3	3.8	2.0	5.5	13.5	1.1	1.3	Did not exist	Did not exist	20.5	13.8
8 Dec	Piepoli	16.0	34.0	6.0		2.0	6.0	16.0			Did not exist	Did not exist	20.0	18.0
6–7 Dec	Tecnè	11.9	34.6	4.8	5.1	2.1	6.0	15.7	2.4	3.3	Did not exist	Did not exist	14.1	18.9
5–6 Dec	EMG	16.3	32.2	6.4	3.9	1.6	5.7	17.1	2.4	2.6	Did not exist	Did not exist	11.8	15.1
4–6 Dec	SpinCon	15.0	29.1	7.2	4.1	1.7	5.4	14.0	1.4	1.2	Did not exist	Did not exist	20.9	14.1
3–5 Dec	SWG	13.8	30.3	6.0	5.2	2.6	5.6	19.7	1.8	2.4	Did not exist	Did not exist	12.6	10.6
3–5 Dec	Demos&Pi	18.2	37.8	4.2	5.2	2.4	5.1	15.0		2.2	Did not exist	Did not exist	9.9	19.6
3 Dec	Ipsos	13.9	36.1	4.9	5.2	1.9	6.0	18.5	2.0	4.0	Did not exist	Did not exist	7.5	17.6
29–30 Nov	EMG	15.2	34.6	6.3	3.8	1.5	6.0	16.3	2.4	2.1	Did not exist	Did not exist	11.8	18.3
29 Nov	ScenariPolitici	14.6	27.6	6.5	5.9	4.0	5.0	19.0	1.7	1.1	Did not exist	Did not exist	14.6	8.6
26–28 Nov	SWG	14.3	30.0	6.1	4.1	2.4	6.0	19.5	1.6	3.8	Did not exist	Did not exist	12.2	10.5
26–28 Nov	Lorien	14.4	30.2	6.5	4.5	3.6	6.0	15.3	1.8		Did not exist	Did not exist	17.7	14.9
26–28 Nov	SpinCon	17.2	30.1	7.6	4.9	2.1	5.8	15.1	1.5		Did not exist	Did not exist	15.7	12.9
26 Nov	Ipsos	14.1	34.1	4.3	6.2	3.2	6.6	18.4	2.3		Did not exist	Did not exist	10.8	15.7
26 Nov	IPR	14.0	33.0	5.5	5.5	2.5	5.0	19.0	3.0		Did not exist	Did not exist	12.5	14.0
23–24 Nov	Euromedia	16.5	30.6	6.8	5.0	2.0	5.9	17.5	1.5		Did not exist	Did not exist	14.2	12.5
22–24 Nov	ISPO	16.1	29.7	6.0	5.2	4.3	5.5	18.3	1.5	2.0	Did not exist	Did not exist	11.4	11.4
22–23 Nov	EMG	16.4	30.3	6.8	4.0	2.1	6.1	17.3	2.0	2.8	Did not exist	Did not exist	12.2	13.0
19–21 Nov	SWG	15.3	26.7	6.2	3.7	2.7	5.3	21.1	1.5		Did not exist	Did not exist	17.5	5.6
19–21 Nov	SpinCon	16.9	28.2	7.7	5.0	2.9	6.4	15.3	1.6		Did not exist	Did not exist	16.0	11.3
20 Nov	IPR	13.0	29.0	5.0	5.5	3.0	4.5	18.0	2.5	8.5	Did not exist	Did not exist	11.0	11.0
19 Nov	Ipsos	15.1	32.2	4.7	5.8	3.1	6.4	20.6	2.0		Did not exist	Did not exist	10.1	11.6
18 Nov	Datamonitor	18.0	28.5	5.0	6.0	4.7	6.0	17.5	2.2		Did not exist	Did not exist	12.1	10.5
15–16 Nov	ISPO	16.1	30.1	6.5	5.9	4.1	5.9	18.9	2.5	Did not exist	Did not exist	Did not exist	10.0	11.2
15–16 Nov	EMG	16.7	29.8	6.5	5.7	2.8	5.9	17.1	2.6	Did not exist	Did not exist	Did not exist	12.9	12.7
13–14 Nov	SWG	15.0	26.2	6.3	5.4	2.8	6.0	20.5	2.2	Did not exist	Did not exist	Did not exist	15.6	5.7
9–13 Nov	SpinCon	15.8	28.1	8.1	5.2	3.1	5.7	15.8	1.9	Did not exist	Did not exist	Did not exist	16.3	12.3
12 Nov	Piepoli	16.5	29.0	7.5	8.0	3.0	6.0	19.0	2.0	Did not exist	Did not exist	Did not exist	9.0	12.5
12 Nov	IPR	14.0	30.5	5.0	6.0	4.0	4.5	19.0	2.5	Did not exist	Did not exist	Did not exist	14.5	11.5
12 Nov	Ipsos	15.5	31.7	5.1	6.3	3.5	6.1	18.8	2.3	Did not exist	Did not exist	Did not exist	10.7	12.9
10 Nov	Demopolis	14.0	27.0					21.0		Did not exist	Did not exist	Did not exist	38.0	6.0
8–9 Nov	EMG	16.3	29.3	6.3	5.8	3.4	5.6	17.4	2.7	Did not exist	Did not exist	Did not exist	13.2	11.9
7–8 Nov	ISPO	16.9	29.1	7.6	6.1	4.6	5.8	18.9	2.6	Did not exist	Did not exist	Did not exist	8.4	10.2
6–8 Nov	Tecnè	14.0	30.8	4.1	6.6	4.1	6.9	15.2	2.8	Did not exist	Did not exist	Did not exist	15.5	13.3
5–7 Nov	SWG	14.7	26.0	6.3	5.2	3.3	5.8	22.0	2.2	Did not exist	Did not exist	Did not exist	14.5	4.0
2–6 Nov	SpinCon	16.4	26.6	8.3	5.5	4.2	5.7	15.2	1.8	Did not exist	Did not exist	Did not exist	16.3	10.2
5 Nov	Ipsos	16.2	30.2	5.1	6.2	4.2	5.7	19.0	2.4	Did not exist	Did not exist	Did not exist	11.0	11.2
2–5 Nov	Lorien	17.4	28.2	6.1	6.4	4.1	5.6	18.3	2.1	Did not exist	Did not exist	Did not exist	11.8	9.9
3 Nov	Piepoli	17.5	27.0	7.5	8.0	5.5	6.0	16.0	2.0	Did not exist	Did not exist	Did not exist	10.5	9.5
1–2 Nov	EMG	15.8	29.9	6.6	5.6	2.9	5.3	18.2	2.7	Did not exist	Did not exist	Did not exist	13.0	11.7
30 Oct	IPR	14.0	30.0	5.0	6.0	5.0	4.5	18.5	2.5	Did not exist	Did not exist	Did not exist	14.5	11.5
29 Oct	Ipsos	16.5	30.3	5.0	6.1	5.5	5.6	19.4	2.2	Did not exist	Did not exist	Did not exist	9.4	10.9
26–29 Oct	SpinCon	16.2	27.5	7.6	5.2	3.9	4.9	16.4	1.7	Did not exist	Did not exist	Did not exist	16.6	11.1
25–26 Oct	EMG	16.2	29.2	6.1	6.0	4.1	4.9	18.0	2.8	Did not exist	Did not exist	Did not exist	12.7	11.2
24 Oct	IPR	14.5	29.5	4.5	6.5	6.5	4.5	16.5	3.0	Did not exist	Did not exist	Did not exist	14.5	13.0
24 Oct	ISPO	17.0	28.1	4.0	6.9	5.1	5.5	16.6	2.1	Did not exist	Did not exist	Did not exist	14.7	11.1
22–24 Oct	SWG	15.0	25.4	6.3	4.9	4.1	5.3	22.0	2.3	Did not exist	Did not exist	Did not exist	14.7	3.4
19–23 Oct	SpinCon	15.6	27.2	7.5	5.0	3.9	5.1	16.6	1.8	Did not exist	Did not exist	Did not exist	17.3	10.6
22 Oct	Ipsos	17.0	29.8	4.8	6.2	5.9	5.4	17.4	2.6	Did not exist	Did not exist	Did not exist	10.9	12.4
22 Oct	IPR	14.5	30.0	4.5	6.5	5.5	4.5	17.5	3.0	Did not exist	Did not exist	Did not exist	14.0	12.5
18–19 Oct	EMG	17.0	28.2	6.4	6.0	4.4	5.0	17.7	3.0	Did not exist	Did not exist	Did not exist	12.3	10.5
15–17 Oct	SWG	14.3	25.9	6.0	5.2	4.3	6.0	21.0	2.5	Did not exist	Did not exist	Did not exist	14.8	4.9
16 Oct	IPR	14.5	28.5	4.5	6.5	6.5	4.5	16.5	3.0	Did not exist	Did not exist	Did not exist	15.5	12.0
15 Oct	Ipsos	17.7	29.2	4.6	6.3	6.0	5.2	17.6	2.4	Did not exist	Did not exist	Did not exist	11.0	11.5
10–14 Oct	SpinCon	15.5	27.0	7.4	5.5	4.1	5.3	14.4	2.8	Did not exist	Did not exist	Did not exist	18.0	11.5
11–12 Oct	Tecnè	15.6	28.9	3.2	6.8	5.5	6.3	14.2	3.3	Did not exist	Did not exist	Did not exist	16.2	13.3
11–12 Oct	EMG	16.8	28.1	6.2	5.9	4.1	5.2	17.7	2.9	Did not exist	Did not exist	Did not exist	13.1	10.4
9–10 Oct	SWG	15.1	25.2	5.8	5.8	5.8	5.7	19.4	2.5	Did not exist	Did not exist	Did not exist	14.7	5.8
7–10 Oct	Demopolis	16.0	26.0	5.5	7.9	6.4	6.5	18.0	2.8	Did not exist	Did not exist	Did not exist	10.9	8.0
8 Oct	Ipsos	18.0	28.5	4.9	6.4	6.0	5.6	17.4	2.5	Did not exist	Did not exist	Did not exist	10.7	10.5
8 Oct	IPR	14.5	28.0	5.5	7.0	7.0	5.0	16.5	2.5	Did not exist	Did not exist	Did not exist	14.0	11.5
3–7 Oct	SpinCon	15.9	25.9	7.1	5.7	4.9	5.7	14.8	2.3	Did not exist	Did not exist	Did not exist	17.7	10.0
4–5 Oct	EMG	18.1	26.5	6.4	6.3	4.7	5.5	17.8	2.9	Did not exist	Did not exist	Did not exist	11.8	8.4
2–3 Oct	SWG	15.0	25.0	5.8	5.9	5.3	5.1	19.6	2.8	Did not exist	Did not exist	Did not exist	15.5	5.4
30 Sep–2 Oct	Lorien	19.7	27.5	6.3	6.2	5.9	5.5	16.4	2.0	Did not exist	Did not exist	Did not exist	10.5	7.8
1 Oct	Ipsos	18.5	28.0	5.0	6.4	6.3	6.0	17.6	2.2	Did not exist	Did not exist	Did not exist	10.0	9.5
1 Oct	IPR	15.0	27.5	5.0	7.5	7.0	5.0	15.0	2.5	Did not exist	Did not exist	Did not exist	15.5	12.5
1 Oct	GPG	18.1	25.1	6.1	6.9	6.1	5.6	14.9	1.6	Did not exist	Did not exist	Did not exist	15.6	7.0
25–30 Sep	SpinCon	16.9	27.1	7.2	5.7	5.2	5.4	14.5	2.2	Did not exist	Did not exist	Did not exist	15.8	10.2
29 Sep	Datamonitor	18.0	25.5	5.7	6.5	6.5	6.0	15.6	2.5	Did not exist	Did not exist	Did not exist	13.7	7.5
27–28 Sep	EMG	19.3	25.8	5.7	6.5	4.5	5.8	16.7	2.3	Did not exist	Did not exist	Did not exist	13.4	6.5
25–26 Sep	SWG	15.2	26.1	6.0	5.3	5.0	5.4	19.3	2.1	Did not exist	Did not exist	Did not exist	15.6	6.8
25 Sep	Piepoli	18.0	27.0	7.5	8.5	5.5	6.0	14.5	1.5	Did not exist	Did not exist	Did not exist	11.5	9.0
25 Sep	IPR	17.0	27.5	5.0	7.0	7.0	5.5	15.0	2.5	Did not exist	Did not exist	Did not exist	13.5	10.5
24 Sep	Ipsos	19.2	26.6	5.2	6.5	6.6	5.7	17.8	2.4	Did not exist	Did not exist	Did not exist	10.0	7.4
19–23 Sep	SpinCon	18.3	26.7	7.5	6.1	5.0	5.6	14.3	2.0	Did not exist	Did not exist	Did not exist	14.5	8.4
20–21 Sep	EMG	20.0	25.7	5.4	6.9	5.1	6.4	14.4	2.1	Did not exist	Did not exist	Did not exist	14.0	5.7
20 Sep	IPR	19.0	27.0	5.5	7.0	7.0	5.0	13.0	2.5	Did not exist	Did not exist	Did not exist	14.0	8.0
19–20 Sep	ISPO	21.4	28.0	4.3	7.3	5.1	5.9	13.9	1.4	Did not exist	Did not exist	Did not exist	12.7	6.6
18–19 Sep	SWG	19.0	25.0	5.5	6.0	5.5	6.0	18.0	2.0	Did not exist	Did not exist	Did not exist	13.0	6.0
17 Sep	Ipsos	22.2	26.3	5.0	6.2	6.9	5.4	16.8	2.6	Did not exist	Did not exist	Did not exist	8.6	4.1
13–14 Sep	EMG	20.7	26.5	5.0	7.1	5.8	6.4	13.4	2.1	Did not exist	Did not exist	Did not exist	13.0	5.8
10–12 Sep	SWG	19.0	24.0	5.5	6.0	5.5	6.0	19.0	2.5	Did not exist	Did not exist	Did not exist	12.5	5.0
11 Sep	ISPO	19.9	28.0	5.2	6.7	6.2	5.3	14.9	1.4	Did not exist	Did not exist	Did not exist	12.4	8.1
10 Sep	Ipsos	21.9	25.4	4.6	6.0	7.5	5.9	17.9	2.3	Did not exist	Did not exist	Did not exist	8.5	3.5
7–10 Sep	Euromedia	20.0	26.0	6.0	7.0	7.0	6.0	11.0	1.5	Did not exist	Did not exist	Did not exist	15.5	6.0
6–7 Sep	EMG	21.4	26.8	5.2	6.7	6.6	6.0	14.3	2.0	Did not exist	Did not exist	Did not exist	11.0	5.4
3–7 Sep	Demos&Pi	19.8	27.0	5.5	7.8	7.8	5.8	14.5	2.8	Did not exist	Did not exist	Did not exist	9.0	7.2
4–5 Sep	Tecnè	18.2	26.9	2.8	7.1	6.8	6.9	12.5	3.2	Did not exist	Did not exist	Did not exist	15.6	8.7
3–5 Sep	SWG	20.5	24.0	5.5	5.0	6.0	6.0	18.5	2.5	Did not exist	Did not exist	Did not exist	12.0	3.5
1–3 Sep	Lorien	21.5	27.0	6.2	6.2	6.5	6.0	15.5	2.1	Did not exist	Did not exist	Did not exist	9.0	5.5
29 Aug	IPR	20.0	26.0	5.0	7.0	6.0	6.0	15.0	2.5	Did not exist	Did not exist	Did not exist	12.5	6.0
22 Aug	Piepoli	20.0	25.0	6.0		5.0	6.0	15.0		Did not exist	Did not exist	Did not exist	23.0	5.0
4–7 Aug	SpinCon	17.9	27.2	7.9	6.1	4.8	5.9	13.0	2.4	Did not exist	Did not exist	Did not exist	14.8	9.3
30 Jul–2 Aug	Lorien	20.6	25.2	5.2	6.6	7.4	5.4	16.3	2.3	Did not exist	Did not exist	Did not exist	11.0	4.6
31 Jul	Datamonitor	20.0	24.0	4.5	5.5	7.0	6.2	14.6	3.4	Did not exist	Did not exist	Did not exist	14.8	4.0
27–31 Jul	SpinCon	18.7	26.3	7.6	5.4	4.4	5.5	13.9	2.7	Did not exist	Did not exist	Did not exist	15.5	7.6
29–30 Jul	SWG	17.0	25.0	5.0	5.0	5.0	6.0	19.5	2.5	Did not exist	Did not exist	Did not exist	15.0	5.5
26–27 Jul	EMG	20.3	27.9	5.1	6.2	7.5	5.7	16.1	1.8	Did not exist	Did not exist	Did not exist	9.4	7.6
23–24 Jul	Digis	18.4	25.4	5.5	7.0	7.0	7.9	16.8	3.7	Did not exist	Did not exist	Did not exist	8.3	6.1
19–24 Jul	SpinCon	18.3	25.7	7.5	5.9	4.7	5.8	12.4	2.5	Did not exist	Did not exist	Did not exist	17.2	7.4
21 Jul	GPG	19.9	24.7	6.0	7.7	6.4	6.0	14.1	2.3	Did not exist	Did not exist	Did not exist	12.9	4.8
19–20 Jul	EMG	19.6	27.3	4.8	6.8	7.9	5.4	16.4	2.2	Did not exist	Did not exist	Did not exist	9.6	7.7
12–17 Jul	SpinCon	18.0	26.7	7.3	6.3	4.8	5.7	13.8	2.0	Did not exist	Did not exist	Did not exist	15.4	8.7
16 Jul	IPR	18.0	25.0	5.0	7.0	6.0	6.0	18.0	2.5	Did not exist	Did not exist	Did not exist	12.5	7.0
15 Jul	Ipsos	18.9	24.8	4.2	6.9	7.8	5.8	19.8		Did not exist	Did not exist	Did not exist	11.8	5.0
12–13 Jul	EMG	20.1	26.5	5.2	7.3	7.6	5.3	16.8	2.1	Did not exist	Did not exist	Did not exist	9.1	6.4
9–12 Jul	Tecnè	18.5	25.5	3.1	7.9	7.5	6.6	12.9	3.1	Did not exist	Did not exist	Did not exist	14.9	7.0
10 Jul	GPG	20.4	24.3	6.4	7.6	6.1	6.1	12.6	2.8	Did not exist	Did not exist	Did not exist	13.7	3.9
5–10 Jul	SpinCon	16.9	26.0	6.7	5.6	5.1	5.5	16.2	2.0	Did not exist	Did not exist	Did not exist	16.0	9.1
5–6 Jul	EMG	20.0	26.0	5.6	7.2	7.6	5.8	15.7	2.1	Did not exist	Did not exist	Did not exist	10.0	6.0
1–4 Jul	IPR	18.0	26.0	5.0	6.0	5.5	6.0	18.0	2.5	Did not exist	Did not exist	Did not exist	13.0	8.0
2–3 Jul	ISPO	18.8	25.7	6.6	6.2	7.3	4.0	16.8	1.7	Did not exist	Did not exist	Did not exist	12.9	6.9
28 Jun–3 Jul	SpinCon	17.3	25.7	6.9	6.1	4.6	5.7	16.4	2.3	Did not exist	Did not exist	Did not exist	15.0	8.4
29–30 Jun	Euromedia	20.3	25.7	4.0	6.0	6.8	5.9	14.9	2.0	Did not exist	Did not exist	Did not exist	14.4	5.4
29 Jun	EMG	20.1	24.8	4.9	6.6	7.9	5.5	17.3	2.3	Did not exist	Did not exist	Did not exist	10.6	4.7
28 Jun	IPR	19.0	27.0	5.0	5.0	5.5	5.5	16.0	2.5	Did not exist	Did not exist	Did not exist	14.5	8.0
28 Jun	SWG	17.1	23.2	4.6	6.8	5.7	5.4	20.8	2.9	Did not exist	Did not exist	Did not exist	13.5	2.4
28 Jun	Datamonitor	19.5	24.5	4.0	5.2	6.5	6.9	16.0	3.2	Did not exist	Did not exist	Did not exist	14.2	5.0
21–26 Jun	SpinCon	17.4	25.5	6.7	6.0	4.2	6.1	16.0	2.3	Did not exist	Did not exist	Did not exist	15.8	8.1
25 Jun	Ipsos	17.3	25.7	4.2	6.7	7.0		20.6		Did not exist	Did not exist	Did not exist	18.5	5.1
20–23 Jun	Tecnè	17.5	24.5	3.0	8.0	8.0	7.0	11.5	3.5	Did not exist	Did not exist	Did not exist	17.0	7.0
21–22 Jun	EMG	18.7	24.9	4.8	6.9	7.1	5.6	19.4	2.5	Did not exist	Did not exist	Did not exist	10.1	5.5
19–20 Jun	SWG	16.7	24.3	4.7	6.0	5.8	6.0	20.0	2.9	Did not exist	Did not exist	Did not exist	13.6	4.3
14–19 Jun	SpinCon	17.1	26.2	6.8	5.3	4.0	5.9	16.4	2.5	Did not exist	Did not exist	Did not exist	15.8	9.1
18 Jun	IPR	16.5	26.5	4.5	7.0	6.0	6.0	19.0	3.0	Did not exist	Did not exist	Did not exist	11.5	10.0
18 Jun	Ipsos	17.0	25.5	4.0	6.4	7.3	6.3	20.9	2.6	Did not exist	Did not exist	Did not exist	10.0	4.6
14–15 Jun	EMG	18.2	25.1	4.6	6.7	6.8	6.0	19.3	2.7	Did not exist	Did not exist	Did not exist	10.6	5.8
12–13 Jun	SWG	15.0	24.0	5.3	5.7	5.5	6.4	21.0	3.8	Did not exist	Did not exist	Did not exist	13.3	3.0
7–12 Jun	SpinCon	18.2	25.6	5.9	5.5	4.4	5.9	17.0	2.4	Did not exist	Did not exist	Did not exist	15.1	7.4
11 Jun	Ipsos	17.6	25.2	4.3	6.5	7.2	6.4	20.6	2.3	Did not exist	Did not exist	Did not exist	9.9	4.6
8–9 Jun	Digis	16.1	24.5	5.0	6.9	7.0	6.1	18.4	3.9	Did not exist	Did not exist	Did not exist	12.1	6.1
7–8 Jun	EMG	18.3	24.7	5.0	6.5	6.5	5.7	19.1	3.0	Did not exist	Did not exist	Did not exist	11.2	5.6
6–7 Jun	Datamonitor	19.0	24.2	4.0	5.5	6.2	7.2	16.4	4.0	Did not exist	Did not exist	Did not exist	13.5	5.2
5–7 Jun	SWG	15.4	23.2	4.9	6.7	6.1	6.1	20.2	3.1	Did not exist	Did not exist	Did not exist	14.3	3.0
4–7 Jun	ISPO	18.1	24.4	4.4	7.5	6.5	5.3	20.3	1.6	Did not exist	Did not exist	Did not exist	11.9	4.1
31 May–5 Jun	SpinCon	17.3	26.7	7.7	5.5	4.4	5.3	14.1	2.3	Did not exist	Did not exist	Did not exist	16.7	9.4
4 Jun	Ipsos	17.2	25.0	4.8	6.8	7.8	6.3	20.0	2.5	Did not exist	Did not exist	Did not exist	9.6	5.0
1–3 Jun	Demopolis	17.0	25.0	4.7	8.0	7.8	7.2	16.0	3.2	Did not exist	Did not exist	Did not exist	11.1	8.0
31 May–1 Jun	EMG	18.1	25.0	4.9	6.9	6.2	6.0	18.1	3.2	Did not exist	Did not exist	Did not exist	11.6	6.9
28–31 May	SWG	16.5	24.1	4.9	6.3	5.7	5.8	18.0	3.6	Did not exist	Did not exist	Did not exist	15.1	6.1
28–30 May	Demos&Pi	17.4	27.5	4.6	7.2	8.4	5.6	16.5	2.5	Did not exist	Did not exist	Did not exist	10.3	10.1
24–29 May	SpinCon	18.6	25.5	6.8	5.6	4.4	5.7	14.8	2.6	Did not exist	Did not exist	Did not exist	16.0	6.9
28 May	Ipsos	16.8	25.6	4.5	7.1	7.3	6.5	19.8	2.7	Did not exist	Did not exist	Did not exist	9.7	5.8
25–26 May	Tecnè	18.5	24.5	3.5	8.0	8.0	7.0	8.0	4.0	Did not exist	Did not exist	Did not exist	18.5	6.0
23–26 May	ISPO	18.7	25.8	5.7	7.7	6.9	6.8	17.8	1.6	Did not exist	Did not exist	Did not exist	9.0	7.1
24–25 May	EMG	18.8	24.8	5.2	7.7	6.0	6.7	14.1	3.5	Did not exist	Did not exist	Did not exist	13.2	6.0
24 May	IPR	19.0	27.0	5.0	5.0	5.5	5.5	16.0	2.5	Did not exist	Did not exist	Did not exist	14.5	8.0
22–24 May	SWG	16.0	24.0	5.7	5.9	5.5	6.0	17.0	4.0	Did not exist	Did not exist	Did not exist	15.9	7.0
21–24 May	Lorien	19.6	25.0	5.5	7.2	8.1	6.9	15.3	2.9	Did not exist	Did not exist	Did not exist	9.5	5.4
17–22 May	SpinCon	19.1	26.4	6.7	5.8	3.8	5.3	15.6	2.3	Did not exist	Did not exist	Did not exist	15.0	7.3
21 May	Ipsos	17.2	26.7	4.6	7.3	7.8	6.1	18.5	2.8	Did not exist	Did not exist	Did not exist	9.0	8.2
17–18 May	EMG	20.3	25.4	4.8	8.2	5.7	7.1	12.2	3.8	Did not exist	Did not exist	Did not exist	12.5	5.1
16–17 May	Datamonitor	20.0	23.9	4.2	6.1	5.7	6.8	14.8	4.5	Did not exist	Did not exist	Did not exist	14.0	3.9
15–17 May	SWG	17.9	24.0	6.2	6.2	6.1	5.6	13.7	4.9	Did not exist	Did not exist	Did not exist	15.4	6.1
10–15 May	SpinCon	18.8	26.1	6.7	5.8	3.9	5.8	13.7	3.0	Did not exist	Did not exist	Did not exist	16.2	7.3
14 May	Ipsos	19.0	25.2	5.0	7.8	7.9	6.6	16.5	3.0	Did not exist	Did not exist	Did not exist	9.0	6.2
11–12 May	Digis	20.1	26.1	5.5	7.9	7.8	7.5	9.2	4.7	Did not exist	Did not exist	Did not exist	11.2	6.0
10–11 May	EMG	21.7	26.5	5.3	8.5	5.5	7.7	8.9	4.0	Did not exist	Did not exist	Did not exist	11.9	4.8
8–9 May	SWG	19.9	24.9	5.1	5.9	5.3	6.1	11.5	4.0	Did not exist	Did not exist	Did not exist	17.3	5.0
3–8 May	SpinCon	20.3	25.6	8.0	5.5	4.1	5.5	12.1	2.9	Did not exist	Did not exist	Did not exist	16.0	5.3
7 May	Ipsos	19.5	25.6	5.2	7.5	8.6	7.7	15.1	3.2	Did not exist	Did not exist	Did not exist	7.6	6.1
3–4 May	EMG	23.2	27.7	5.8	8.9	6.0	7.4	6.0	3.9	Did not exist	Did not exist	Did not exist	11.1	4.5
2–3 May	SWG	25.0	26.9	6.1	6.0	5.8	6.5	7.6	4.7	Did not exist	Did not exist	Did not exist	11.4	1.9
26–27 Apr	EMG	23.1	29.2	5.7	8.7	6.7	7.0	5.4	3.9	Did not exist	Did not exist	Did not exist	10.3	6.1
26 Apr	IPR	22.5	28.0	5.5	8.5	7.5	7.5	6.0	2.5	Did not exist	Did not exist	Did not exist	12.0	5.5
23 Apr	Ipsos	20.2	26.2	7.1	8.5	9.3	7.5	7.7	4.1	Did not exist	Did not exist	Did not exist	9.4	6.0
17–22 Apr	SpinCon	21.6	25.7	7.6	6.3	4.9	6.4	7.3	3.4	Did not exist	Did not exist	Did not exist	16.8	4.1
19–20 Apr	EMG	21.9	29.7	6.7	9.1	7.5	6.6	4.6	3.8	Did not exist	Did not exist	Did not exist	10.1	7.8
18–19 Apr	SWG	25.3	26.2	6.9	6.1	6.2	6.2	7.3	4.9	Did not exist	Did not exist	Did not exist	10.9	0.9
18 Apr	SpinCon	23.1	24.5	7.5	6.6	6.1	7.4	6.2	3.5	Did not exist	Did not exist	Did not exist	15.1	1.4
17 Apr	IPR	23.0	28.5	6.0	8.5	7.5	7.0	5.5	2.5	Did not exist	Did not exist	Did not exist	11.5	5.5
14–17 Apr	Lorien	23.8	26.6	7.8	7.6	9.0	7.5	4.2	3.2	Did not exist	Did not exist	Did not exist	10.3	2.8
16 Apr	Ipsos	20.8	26.0	7.2	8.2	9.3	7.4	7.5	4.3	Did not exist	Did not exist	Did not exist	9.3	5.2
14–16 Apr	Demopolis	23.0	26.0	7.0	8.3	8.8	7.2	7.5	3.7	Did not exist	Did not exist	Did not exist	8.5	3.0
13–14 Apr	Digis	21.9	26.9	7.0	8.0	8.5	7.3	5.0	4.9	Did not exist	Did not exist	Did not exist	10.5	5.0
12–13 Apr	EMG	21.4	30.1	6.6	9.0	8.1	6.1	4.4	3.8	Did not exist	Did not exist	Did not exist	10.5	8.7
11–13 Apr	Tecnè	23.0	26.0	4.0	8.0	8.5	6.5	6.0	4.5	Did not exist	Did not exist	Did not exist	13.5	3.0
10–12 Apr	Datamonitor	24.2	24.9	6.5	6.8	7.2	6.5	6.8	4.9	Did not exist	Did not exist	Did not exist	12.2	0.7
10–11 Apr	SWG	24.9	25.2	7.1	6.3	6.5	6.8	7.2	5.0	Did not exist	Did not exist	Did not exist	11.0	0.3
4–11 Apr	CISE	22.5	30.2	7.4	8.5	9.5	7.8	5.5	2.8	Did not exist	Did not exist	Did not exist	5.8	7.7
10 Apr	Ipsos	22.2	26.2	6.5	8.0	9.4	7.2	5.2	4.0	Did not exist	Did not exist	Did not exist	11.3	4.0
5–10 Apr	SpinCon	22.9	25.3	8.2	6.9	6.7	7.3	5.8	3.7	Did not exist	Did not exist	Did not exist	13.2	2.4
5–6 Apr	EMG	22.0	28.9	7.0	8.3	8.0	7.2	4.1	3.7	Did not exist	Did not exist	Did not exist	10.8	6.9
29 Mar–5 Apr	SWG	24.7	26.0	7.9	6.2	6.2	6.8	7.4	5.0	Did not exist	Did not exist	Did not exist	9.8	1.3
4 Apr	SpinCon	22.3	25.6	8.4	7.4	6.5	7.9	5.6	3.9	Did not exist	Did not exist	Did not exist	12.4	3.3
3 Apr	IPR	22.0	27.0	9.0	8.5	7.0	7.0	5.0	3.0	Did not exist	Did not exist	Did not exist	11.5	5.0
28 Mar–3 Apr	ISPO	21.6	29.0	7.9	7.5	8.6	7.0	3.8	2.9	Did not exist	Did not exist	Did not exist	11.7	7.4
30 Mar–2 Apr	Euromedia	23.8	26.4	7.9	8.1	7.6	7.7	4.1	2.5	Did not exist	Did not exist	Did not exist	11.9	2.6
29–30 Mar	EMG	22.7	27.2	8.2	7.5	8.4	8.0	4.0	3.3	Did not exist	Did not exist	Did not exist	10.7	4.5
28 Mar	IPR	22.0	27.5	9.5	8.5	7.0	7.5	5.0	3.0	Did not exist	Did not exist	Did not exist	10.0	5.5
28 Mar	SpinCon	23.6	25.9	8.9	6.8	6.8	7.7	5.0	4.0	Did not exist	Did not exist	Did not exist	11.3	2.3
26–28 Mar	Lorien	25.1	27.6	8.7	7.9	8.2	7.0	3.4	3.4	Did not exist	Did not exist	Did not exist	8.7	2.5
26 Mar	Ipsos	21.8	27.0	9.7	7.7	9.0	7.2	4.7	4.2	Did not exist	Did not exist	Did not exist	8.7	5.2
23–24 Mar	Digis	22.3	27.2	9.8	8.3	7.9	7.0	4.5	5.0	Did not exist	Did not exist	Did not exist	8.0	4.9
22–23 Mar	EMG	23.8	26.6	7.9	7.2	7.8	8.8	3.9	3.0	Did not exist	Did not exist	Did not exist	11.0	2.8
19–21 Mar	SWG	23.5	26.0	9.0	6.5	5.5	7.0	7.0	5.5	Did not exist	Did not exist	Did not exist	10.0	2.5
19 Mar	Ipsos	22.1	27.7	10.0	8.2	8.5	7.0	4.4	4.0	Did not exist	Did not exist	Did not exist	8.1	5.6
16–19 Mar	Euromedia	23.7	26.6	9.0	8.5	6.2	6.7	4.5	2.5	Did not exist	Did not exist	Did not exist	12.3	2.9
12–19 Mar	IBS	24.0	25.5	10.0	7.0	7.1	7.9	5.5	3.4	Did not exist	Did not exist	Did not exist	9.6	1.5
15–16 Mar	EMG	23.6	26.0	8.4	7.0	7.7	8.7	4.4	3.2	Did not exist	Did not exist	Did not exist	11.0	2.4
14–15 Mar	ISPO	21.6	27.5	8.8	8.0	8.7	7.4	4.1	3.2	Did not exist	Did not exist	Did not exist	10.7	5.9
14–15 Mar	Tecnè	22.0	26.0	7.0	7.5	8.5	7.5	5.0	4.5	Did not exist	Did not exist	Did not exist	12.0	4.0
13–15 Mar	Demos&Pi	23.5	27.2	10.1	9.8	8.5	5.9	5.2	3.8	Did not exist	Did not exist	Did not exist	6.0	3.7
14 Mar	Coesis	23.0	29.0	10.0	8.0	8.0	7.0	5.0	4.0	Did not exist	Did not exist	Did not exist	6.0	6.0
13 Mar	GPG	21.8	25.0	9.9	7.6	6.4	7.0	5.9	3.4	Did not exist	Did not exist	Did not exist	13.0	3.2
12 Mar	Ipsos	22.2	27.5	9.8	8.4	8.4	6.8	4.5	4.1	Did not exist	Did not exist	Did not exist	8.3	5.3
10–11 Mar	Digis	21.9	26.9	10.0	8.0	8.1	7.2	4.4	4.9	Did not exist	Did not exist	Did not exist	8.6	5.0
8–9 Mar	EMG	23.7	25.6	8.8	7.3	7.1	8.2	4.9	3.4	Did not exist	Did not exist	Did not exist	11.0	1.9
5–8 Mar	Lorien	26.1	28.0	8.9	7.5	8.8	6.2	2.7	3.5	Did not exist	Did not exist	Did not exist	8.3	1.9
5–6 Mar	ISPO	22.1	27.4	9.3	8.4	8.1	7.2	4.0	3.3	Did not exist	Did not exist	Did not exist	10.2	5.3
2–6 Mar	SWG	23.5	26.0	8.5	6.5	5.5	7.0	7.0	5.5	Did not exist	Did not exist	Did not exist	10.5	2.5
5 Mar	Ipsos	22.0	27.4	10.2	8.1	8.6	6.7	4.3	4.3	Did not exist	Did not exist	Did not exist	8.4	5.4
2–5 Mar	Euromedia	23.7	26.3	10.5	7.5	7.1	7.5	4.3	2.4	Did not exist	Did not exist	Did not exist	10.7	2.6
3–4 Mar	Digis	21.5	27.0	10.1	8.1	8.2	7.4	4.5	4.8	Did not exist	Did not exist	Did not exist	8.4	5.5
1–3 Mar	IPR	22.0	28.0	9.5	8.0	7.0	7.0	5.0	3.5	Did not exist	Did not exist	Did not exist	10.0	6.0
1–2 Mar	EMG	23.7	25.9	9.9	7.6	6.9	7.6	4.7	3.3	Did not exist	Did not exist	Did not exist	10.4	2.2
25–28 Feb	Demopolis	21.0	27.0	10.2	8.0	9.0	7.8	4.5	3.9	Did not exist	Did not exist	Did not exist	11.3	6.0
27 Feb	Ipsos	22.0	27.3	9.9	8.3	8.4	7.0	4.5	4.2	Did not exist	Did not exist	Did not exist	8.4	5.3
23–24 Feb	EMG	23.4	26.1	10.6	7.7	7.3	6.9	4.6	3.4	Did not exist	Did not exist	Did not exist	10.0	2.7
22–23 Feb	ISPO	20.7	26.5	9.0	8.2	8.1	7.4	4.3	4.5	Did not exist	Did not exist	Did not exist	11.3	5.8
21 Feb	Piepoli	24.0	29.5	9.5	9.0	4.0	6.5	3.0	4.0	Did not exist	Did not exist	Did not exist	10.5	5.5
20 Feb	Ipsos	22.1	27.5	10.2	8.0	8.7	6.8	4.9	3.9	Did not exist	Did not exist	Did not exist	7.9	5.4
17–18 Feb	Digis	22.5	27.9	10.1	7.6	7.5	6.9	4.7	4.6	Did not exist	Did not exist	Did not exist	8.2	5.4
16–17 Feb	EMG	22.4	26.4	11.1	7.6	7.3	7.1	4.2	3.3	Did not exist	Did not exist	Did not exist	10.6	4.0
15–17 Feb	Lorien	25.5	27.8	10.4	7.7	8.1	7.0	3.4	2.4	Did not exist	Did not exist	Did not exist	7.7	2.3
13–15 Feb	Tecnè	23.0	27.0	6.5	7.5	8.5	7.0	5.0	5.0	Did not exist	Did not exist	Did not exist	10.5	4.0
13 Feb	Ipsos	22.5	27.1	10.1	7.7	8.3	6.6	5.2	3.7	Did not exist	Did not exist	Did not exist	8.8	4.6
9–10 Feb	EMG	23.5	27.6	10.4	7.9	6.5	6.0	4.4	3.7	Did not exist	Did not exist	Did not exist	10.0	4.1
6 Feb	Ipsos	22.2	28.0	10.2	7.8	8.5	6.5	4.8	3.8	Did not exist	Did not exist	Did not exist	8.2	5.8
2–3 Feb	EMG	22.8	29.0	9.9	8.1	6.3	6.3	4.0	3.6	Did not exist	Did not exist	Did not exist	10.0	6.2
30 Jan–1 Feb	Lorien	26.0	28.6	9.2	8.0	7.2	6.4	4.7	2.6	Did not exist	Did not exist	Did not exist	7.3	2.6
31 Jan	GPG	21.7	24.5	9.7	7.1	5.5	6.7	6.9	3.8	Did not exist	Did not exist	Did not exist	14.1	2.8
30–31 Jan	Crespi	22.0	27.5	10.5	7.5	6.5	7.0	4.1	4.0	Did not exist	Did not exist	Did not exist	10.9	5.5
30 Jan	Digis	23.0	28.1	9.7	7.8	7.9	6.9	4.5	4.6	Did not exist	Did not exist	Did not exist	7.5	5.1
30 Jan	Ipsos	22.5	28.1	10.2	7.8	8.8	6.7	4.7	3.5	Did not exist	Did not exist	Did not exist	7.7	5.6
27 Jan	Coesis	23.0	28.0	10.0	7.5	7.5	7.0	4.5	4.0	Did not exist	Did not exist	Did not exist	8.5	5.0
27 Jan	Demos&Pi	22.3	28.8	9.8	10.5	8.3	6.0	3.7	3.4	Did not exist	Did not exist	Did not exist	7.2	6.5
26–27 Jan	EMG	23.2	28.9	9.0	7.6	6.7	6.3	4.0	4.0	Did not exist	Did not exist	Did not exist	10.3	5.7
23 Jan	Ipsos	22.2	28.4	10.3	8.0	8.5	6.9	4.6	3.6	Did not exist	Did not exist	Did not exist	7.5	6.2
16–18 Jan	ISPO	24.2	28.3	8.5	7.4	7.5	6.0	3.6	3.7	Did not exist	Did not exist	Did not exist	10.8	4.1
16–17 Jan	EMG	24.7	28.1	9.4	7.9	7.4	5.5	4.3	3.2	Did not exist	Did not exist	Did not exist	9.5	3.4
16 Jan	Ipsos	22.5	28.8	9.7	7.8	8.3	7.1	4.1	3.9	Did not exist	Did not exist	Did not exist	7.8	6.3
13 Jan	Tecnè	24.5	28.0	6.0	7.5	8.5	7.0	5.0	5.0	Did not exist	Did not exist	Did not exist	8.5	3.5
12–13 Jan	EMG	22.9	28.0	10.2	7.4	6.6	6.7	3.6	3.8	Did not exist	Did not exist	Did not exist	10.8	5.1
10–13 Jan	SWG	23.5	25.5	10.0	7.0	6.5	7.5	7.5	5.5	Did not exist	Did not exist	Did not exist	7.0	2.0
9 Jan	Ipsos	23.0	29.5	9.8	7.5	8.0	7.0	4.3	3.7	Did not exist	Did not exist	Did not exist	7.2	6.5

=== 2011 ===
Date	Polling firm	PdL	PD	LN	UdC	IdV	SEL	M5S	FLI	Others	Lead
19 Dec	Ipsos	24.0	29.6	8.8	7.5	8.3	6.5	4.4	4.4	6.5	5.6
12–19 Dec	CISE	23.3	31.9	12.2	6.6	7.1	6.2	4.6	3.6	4.5	8.6
15–16 Dec	EMG	24.2	28.2	9.0	7.2	5.8	6.4	4.1	4.0	11.1	4.0
15 Dec	IPR	25.0	28.0	7.7	6.5	7.0	7.5	3.5	4.0	10.8	3.0
14–15 Dec	Tecnè	25.5	28.5	7.0	6.5	8.0	6.5	4.5	5.0	8.5	3.0
12–15 Dec	GPG	23.0	25.0	9.9	6.5	5.4	5.8	6.5	3.7	14.2	2.0
12–14 Dec	Lorien	27.6	26.9	10.6	7.5	6.3	5.1	5.1	4.1	6.8	0.7
12–13 Dec	Euromedia	25.5	27.9	10.0	8.0	7.4	5.4	3.8	2.2	9.8	2.4
12–13 Dec	ISPO	25.8	28.5	8.6	6.8	7.0	6.7	3.9	4.5	8.2	2.7
7–9 Dec	SWG	24.0	25.0	11.0	6.5	5.5	7.0	7.0	5.0	9.0	1.0
7–9 Dec	EMG	24.7	29.4	9.2	7.3	6.0	6.1	3.4	4.2	9.7	4.7
5–7 Dec	Crespi	26.0	27.6	8.0	7.7	6.5	6.5	2.8	4.1	10.8	1.6
2–3 Dec	Digis	24.6	28.3	8.4	7.0	7.3	7.1	4.1	4.9	8.3	3.7
1–2 Dec	EMG	25.4	28.8	9.4	6.9	6.2	6.7	3.3	4.3	9.0	3.4
28 Nov	Ipsos	24.3	28.6	8.6	7.0	7.5	7.1	4.2	4.5	8.2	4.3
24–25 Nov	EMG	24.9	28.4	9.2	7.1	6.7	6.6	3.6	4.4	9.1	3.5
23 Nov	CISE	21.8	32.7	9.1	8.4	7.7	4.7	3.9	3.8	7.9	10.9
23 Nov	IPR	25.0	28.0	7.5	7.0	6.5	7.0	4.0	4.5	10.5	3.0
21–23 Nov	Lorien	27.0	25.9	10.3	7.6	7.6	5.8	4.0	4.1	7.7	1.1
19–22 Nov	Demopolis	24.0	29.0	8.0	8.2	7.8	7.5	3.5	4.1	7.9	5.0
21 Nov	Ipsos	24.8	28.8	8.3	6.8	7.7	7.5	4.0	4.6	7.5	4.0
18–21 Nov	SWG	26.0	26.0	9.5	7.0	6.0	6.0	5.5	5.5	8.5	0.0
18 Nov	Tecnè	24.5	28.0	7.5	7.0	7.5	7.0	4.5	5.0	9.0	3.5
17–18 Nov	Demos&Pi	24.2	29.4	7.7	10.4	8.0	5.2	4.6	3.7	6.8	5.2
17–18 Nov	EMG	25.6	27.5	8.8	7.4	6.4	7.1	3.6	4.3	9.3	1.9
14 Nov	Ipsos	24.4	28.0	8.4	7.0	7.6	8.2	3.8	4.4	8.2	3.6
7–12 Nov	TP	24.6	29.3	7.4	10.4	6.1	7.8	4.0	4.1	6.3	4.7
11 Nov	Ipsos	24.9	26.8	8.8	7.0	7.8	8.4	3.9	4.1	8.3	1.9
10–11 Nov	EMG	25.2	26.8	8.7	7.3	6.6	8.0	3.6	4.2	9.6	1.6
8 Nov	IPR	25.3	27.5	7.7	6.5	7.0	7.5	4.2	3.5	10.8	2.2
7 Nov	Ipsos	25.3	26.7	9.2	7.1	8.7	8.6	4.2	4.2	6.0	1.4
4–5 Nov	Euromedia	25.9	27.2	8.4	7.4	8.1	6.4	4.0	2.1	10.5	1.3
4–5 Nov	Digis	25.1	26.4	8.9	7.0	7.4	8.1	4.0	4.9	8.2	1.3
3–4 Nov	EMG	25.6	26.6	8.9	7.1	7.0	8.3	3.4	4.3	8.8	1.0
2–4 Nov	GPG	24.0	25.3	8.0	6.2	6.1	6.1	6.1	4.2	14.0	1.3
2–3 Nov	ISPO	25.8	26.8	8.1	6.8	6.7	7.1	3.4	5.0	10.3	1.0
28 Oct	IPR	25.3	28.0	7.7	7.0	7.0	7.5	3.5	3.5	10.5	2.7
27–28 Oct	EMG	26.0	26.4	8.9	7.0	6.8	8.7	3.2	4.3	8.7	0.4
25–28 Oct	SWG	25.5	26.5	9.0	7.0	6.0	6.5	5.5	5.0	9.0	1.0
24–28 Oct	Piepoli	26.5	27.0	8.0	7.0	6.5	7.5	3.5	3.5	10.5	0.5
25–27 Oct	Crespi	25.2	26.2	8.4	7.3	7.0	7.2	2.5	5.0	11.2	1.0
25–27 Oct	Tecnè	25.0	27.5	8.5	6.5	7.0	7.5	4.5	4.5	9.0	2.5
24 Oct	Ipsos	25.5	26.6	9.4	6.9	9.0	9.0	4.0	3.8	5.8	1.1
17–24 Oct	ISPO	26.4	25.9	8.7	6.9	6.8	7.8	3.4	5.2	8.9	0.5
21–23 Oct	SWG	24.5	26.0	8.5	6.5	6.5	7.0	5.5	5.0	10.5	1.5
21–22 Oct	Euromedia	26.5	27.2	8.3	7.1	6.5	7.0	3.8	2.3	11.3	0.7
20–21 Oct	EMG	26.2	26.8	9.0	6.9	6.7	8.6	3.1	4.1	8.6	0.6
18–20 Oct	Demos&Pi	26.1	28.1	8.8	7.5	8.2	6.8	4.3	3.6	6.6	2.0
17 Oct	Ipsos	25.7	27.0	9.6	6.8	8.9	9.2	4.0	3.2	5.6	1.3
12–17 Oct	EMG	26.8	26.9	8.1	6.5	6.1	8.8	3.8	3.5	9.5	0.1
14–15 Oct	Digis	25.7	26.8	9.5	6.2	8.0	8.4	3.3	4.6	7.5	1.1
13–14 Oct	EMG	27.0	26.1	9.0	6.4	6.3	9.3	3.6	3.9	8.4	0.9
10–12 Oct	Lorien	25.8	26.1	11.0	7.4	8.6	5.7	4.0	2.9	8.5	0.3
10 Oct	Ipsos	26.4	26.9	9.7	6.4	8.8	9.1	3.8	3.1	5.8	0.5
6–7 Oct	EMG	26.6	26.6	8.7	6.8	6.5	9.0	3.3	3.7	8.8	0.0
3–4 Oct	Crespi	25.0	26.0	8.3	8.0	8.0	6.5	3.0	3.5	11.7	1.0
3 Oct	Ipsos	26.0	26.7	10.2	6.5	8.6	9.0	4.0	2.8	6.2	0.7
30 Sep–1 Oct	IPR	26.0	28.0	8.0	7.5	6.5	7.5	3.5	3.5	9.5	2.0
29–30 Sep	EMG	26.3	27.1	8.9	7.2	6.7	8.7	3.1	3.2	8.8	0.8
28–29 Sep	ISPO	26.2	28.0	9.4	7.4	7.3	7.7	2.8	3.5	7.7	1.8
28–29 Sep	Tecnè	24.5	28.0	8.5	6.5	7.0	8.0	4.0	4.0	9.5	3.5
26–28 Sep	Lorien	26.6	26.1	11.4	7.3	8.3	5.2	4.7	3.2	7.2	0.5
22–23 Sep	EMG	26.5	27.0	9.3	7.4	6.4	8.9	3.0	3.0	8.5	0.5
19 Sep	Ipsos	26.2	26.4	10.3	6.6	9.0	8.6	3.9	3.0	6.0	0.2
16–17 Sep	Digis	26.1	27.2	9.5	6.1	7.8	8.1	3.5	3.5	8.2	1.1
15–16 Sep	EMG	26.8	27.0	9.1	7.2	6.2	8.7	3.0	3.0	9.0	0.2
13 Sep	IPR	26.5	27.0	9.0	7.0	6.0	7.5	3.5	3.5	10.0	0.5
8–13 Sep	GPG	24.1	26.7	8.9	6.1	7.1	5.6	4.2	3.3	14.0	2.6
12 Sep	Ipsos	26.0	26.6	10.7	6.8	8.3	8.5	3.7	3.1	6.3	0.6
7–8 Sep	EMG	27.3	27.8	9.4	7.0	5.8	8.2	2.8	2.8	8.9	0.5
7–8 Sep	Lorien	26.9	25.4	11.8	6.9	8.8	5.6	4.2	3.2	7.2	1.5
5–6 Sep	IPR	26.5	27.5	9.0	7.0	6.0	7.0	3.5	3.5	10.0	1.0
30 Aug–5 Sep	SWG	24.5	24.5	9.0	6.0	6.5	7.0	6.0	5.5	11.0	0.0
30 Aug–1 Sep	Demos&Pi	25.5	29.5	9.8	7.4	9.2	5.3	3.5	3.3	6.5	4.0
26–29 Jul	SWG	24.0	25.0	9.0	6.0	7.0	7.5	6.5	5.5	9.5	1.0
27–28 Jul	Crespi	26.0	26.5	9.0	7.1	6.5	7.2	2.1	3.7	11.9	0.5
24–25 Jul	Tecnè	26.5	29.5	9.5	6.0	6.5	7.0	3.5	3.0	8.5	3.0
22–25 Jul	Demopolis	26.0	28.0	9.8	7.0	6.1	7.4	3.6	3.4	8.7	2.0
21–22 Jul	IPR	27.5	28.0	9.0	6.5	5.5	6.5	3.0	3.5	10.5	0.5
20–21 Jul	EMG	26.9	27.6	9.9	7.6	6.1	7.5	2.8	3.2	8.4	0.7
20 Jul	GPG	25.8	27.7	10.2	5.3	5.1	6.2	3.7	3.0	13.0	1.9
18 Jul	Lorien	25.9	26.8	10.1	6.4	8.2	6.3	3.8	3.6	8.9	0.9
14 Jul	Piepoli	29.0	29.5	9.5	5.5	4.5	7.0		2.0	13.0	0.5
13–14 Jul	EMG	28.1	28.4	10.3	6.6	6.3	7.2	2.1	3.3	7.7	0.3
13–14 Jul	ISPO	27.1	28.2	9.6	7.0	6.2	7.4	2.5	3.7	8.3	1.1
11–13 Jul	Demopolis	26.5	28.0	9.9	7.0	5.8	7.5	3.0	3.5	8.8	1.5
6–7 Jul	EMG	28.6	27.5	10.9	6.5	6.6	7.0	2.3	2.9	7.7	1.1
24–25 Jun	Digis	27.0	28.9	10.3	5.3	6.0	8.2	2.7	3.4	8.2	1.9
22–23 Jun	EMG	28.9	28.2	9.9	6.1	6.0	7.0	2.5	2.8	8.6	0.7
21–23 Jun	Crespi	26.5	26.8	9.0	7.0	6.0	7.0	2.1	3.5	12.1	0.3
21–23 Jun	Demos&Pi	26.4	29.7	10.8	6.7	7.8	5.6	4.0	3.7	5.3	3.3
20 Jun	Ipsos	27.4	29.9	10.5	5.1	6.5	8.4	3.8	3.2	5.2	2.5
15–17 Jun	Tecnè	27.5	28.5	10.5	5.5	6.0	6.5	3.5	3.5	8.5	1.0
15–16 Jun	EMG	28.4	28.6	10.0	6.0	5.5	7.0	2.6	3.2	8.7	0.2
14 Jun	Ipsos	27.1	29.8	10.2	5.2	6.4	8.5	4.0	3.3	5.5	2.7
6–13 Jun	Piepoli	29.5	29.0	9.5	5.5	4.5	7.5	2.0	3.0	9.5	0.5
11–12 Jun	IPR	27.5	27.5	9.5	7.0	4.5	6.5	2.5	3.5	11.5	0.0
8–9 Jun	EMG	28.7	28.1	10.2	6.0	4.8	7.2	2.8	3.3	8.9	0.6
3 Jun	Lorien	26.0	26.2	11.0	6.8	7.4	6.9	4.0	3.2	8.5	0.2
3 Jun	GPG	26.4	26.7	10.7	5.4	4.2	6.3	3.8	3.4	13.1	0.3
31 May–2 Jun	Crespi	27.0	26.0	10.0	6.5	5.3	8.0	2.5	3.0	11.7	1.0
1 Jun	EMG	27.8	27.4	10.6	6.1	4.6	8.0	3.2	2.9	9.4	0.4
11–16 May	ScenariPolitici	26.0	25.4	10.7	5.5	5.3	6.7	2.9	5.1	12.4	0.6
9 May	Lorien	27.0	25.7	12.7	6.8	7.1	7.2	4.7	2.7	6.1	1.3
4 May	GPG	26.6	25.8	11.9	5.4	4.7	6.3	3.3	4.1	11.9	0.8
26–27 Apr	Demopolis	28.0	27.0	11.4	7.0	5.2	7.8	2.0	4.3	7.3	1.0
26 Apr	CISE	29.7	29.5	9.8	7.2	6.9	6.4	1.3	4.0	5.2	0.2
20–26 Apr	Crespi	28.0	25.8	10.0	6.8	5.0	7.0	1.5	4.8	11.1	2.2
19–23 Apr	ScenariPolitici	26.4	25.2	11.0	5.1	4.8	6.8	3.0	5.5	12.2	1.2
18 Apr	Ipsos	29.3	27.5	10.5	5.6	5.7	8.1	2.5	3.6	7.2	1.8
14–17 Apr	EMG	28.6	26.2	10.9	6.8	4.1	8.3	1.8	4.0	9.3	2.4
14–16 Apr	IPR	28.0	27.0	11.0	6.8	4.3	7.2	2.0	4.2	9.5	1.0
11–13 Apr	SWG	26.0	25.0	12.5	4.5	5.0	7.0	5.0	5.5	9.5	1.0
9–11 Apr	IPR	28.0	27.0	11.0	6.7	4.5	7.0	2.0	4.3	9.5	1.0
8–11 Apr	Lorien	27.9	24.6	12.5	7.0	7.3	7.1	4.0	3.5	6.1	3.3
7–10 Apr	EMG	29.1	26.2	11.1	6.6	4.3	8.2	1.7	4.2	8.6	2.9
4–7 Apr	Tecnè	29.5	26.0	11.0	6.0	6.5	7.0	1.5	4.0	8.5	3.5
4–6 Apr	Crespi	27.5	25.0	10.0	7.0	5.0	7.0	1.5	5.0	12.0	2.5
4 Apr	Ipsos	28.6	26.8	10.7	5.6	5.8	8.6	2.6	3.7	7.6	1.8
30 Mar–3 Apr	EMG	29.4	25.6	11.5	6.9	4.5	7.7	1.8	4.0	8.6	3.8
28 Mar	Ipsos	28.8	27.4	10.4	5.7	5.6	8.3	2.1	4.0	7.7	1.4
28 Mar	GPG	26.8	25.2	11.7	5.7	4.9	6.7	2.6	4.2	12.2	1.6
24–27 Mar	EMG	29.1	25.4	11.4	7.1	4.8	8.1	2.0	3.7	8.4	3.7
25–26 Mar	Digis	27.9	25.0	11.1	6.6	5.8	8.2	2.0	5.0	8.4	2.9
23 Mar	Lorien	28.5	25.2	11.9	7.2	6.6	8.1	3.2	3.7	5.6	3.3
19–21 Mar	Demopolis	28.5	26.0	10.8	6.5	5.5	8.1	1.9	4.9	7.8	2.5
16–20 Mar	EMG	29.0	24.9	10.8	7.0	5.4	8.7	1.7	4.0	8.5	4.1
14–17 Mar	ScenariPolitici	27.4	23.4	11.2	6.1	5.3	7.6	2.2	5.1	11.7	4.0
13–14 Mar	IPR	29.0	26.5	11.5	7.0	5.0	7.3	2.0	4.0	7.7	2.5
10–13 Mar	EMG	28.9	25.1	11.1	7.0	5.1	9.0	1.7	4.3	7.8	3.8
11–12 Mar	Digis	27.6	24.4	11.5	6.5	5.9	8.0	2.0	5.3	8.8	3.2
8–9 Mar	IPR	29.0	26.5	11.5	7.0	5.0	7.3	2.0	4.0	7.7	2.5
7–8 Mar	Tecnè	31.0	26.5	10.5	6.0	6.5	6.0		4.5	9.0	4.5
4–7 Mar	FullResearch	27.0	26.0	10.0	6.6	5.7	8.0	2.0	6.8	7.9	1.0
3–6 Mar	EMG	29.2	25.3	11.1	6.7	5.4	8.5	1.7	4.1	8.0	3.9
28 Feb	Ipsos	29.2	27.1	10.8	6.0	6.3	8.7	2.7	4.1	5.1	2.1
25–28 Feb	FullResearch	27.8	26.3	10.0	6.4	5.5	8.3	2.0	6.6	7.1	1.5
24–28 Feb	Crespi	27.0	24.4	10.0	6.8	5.2	8.0	1.8	6.5	10.3	2.6
24–27 Feb	EMG	30.1	25.9	10.9	6.3	5.9	8.2	1.8	3.6	7.3	4.2
25–26 Feb	Digis	27.8	24.5	11.8	6.5	6.0	7.6	2.0	5.7	8.1	3.3
25 Feb	CFI Group	30.9	29.8	9.3	6.6	5.6	6.3	1.6	5.1	4.8	1.1
25 Feb	GPG	26.8	25.0	11.6	6.0	5.3	7.2	2.4	4.3	11.4	1.8
21 Feb	Ipsos	28.4	26.7	11.0	5.8	6.5	9.0	2.6	4.6	5.4	1.7
18–20 Feb	SWG	26.5	24.5	12.0	6.0	6.0	7.5	3.5	6.5	7.5	2.0
17–20 Feb	EMG	29.9	26.1	10.8	6.7	5.6	8.4	1.6	3.6	7.3	3.8
18–19 Feb	Euromedia	30.2	25.9	12.0	6.5	6.1	7.1	1.4	3.0	7.8	4.3
17–18 Feb	CFI Group	30.8	30.3	9.2	6.0	5.3	6.5	1.7	5.0	5.2	0.5
16–18 Feb	ISPO	30.6	25.8	9.9	5.4	5.2	6.9	2.2	4.9	9.1	4.8
8–18 Feb	MManagement	28.0	29.5	10.0	5.5	6.5	8.0	1.0	5.0	6.5	1.5
16–17 Feb	IPR	29.0	26.0	11.5	6.5	5.5	7.0	1.5	3.7	9.3	3.0
14–16 Feb	Lorien	30.0	24.7	11.1	7.1	5.7	9.0	2.5	4.2	5.7	5.3
14 Feb	Ipsos	27.9	26.0	11.3	6.0	6.6	9.4	2.0	5.6	5.2	1.9
11–14 Feb	FullResearch	28.0	25.0	10.0	6.5	5.4	9.0	2.5	7.5	6.1	3.0
10–13 Feb	EMG	30.3	25.3	11.4	6.2	5.1	9.3	1.6	3.7	7.1	5.0
11–12 Feb	Digis	28.6	24.4	11.4	6.3	6.0	7.7	2.0	5.8	7.8	4.2
10–11 Feb	CFI Group	31.0	30.6	9.3	5.3	4.4	6.3	1.6	6.9	4.6	0.4
9–11 Feb	ScenariPolitici	27.5	23.1	11.8	5.6	5.1	7.7	2.2	5.0	12.0	4.4
9–11 Feb	Demos&Pi	27.2	24.3	11.8	7.1	5.9	8.2	3.6	5.5	6.4	2.9
2–11 Feb	Tecnè	32.0	27.5	9.0	6.0	6.5	4.5		4.0	10.5	4.5
10 Feb	IPR	29.5	25.5	12.0	6.5	5.0	7.0	1.5	4.0	9.0	4.0
7 Feb	Ipsos	27.6	25.8	11.5	5.8	6.8	9.7	2.4	5.0	5.4	1.8
4–7 Feb	Demopolis	27.5	24.5	11.3	6.9	5.9	8.6	2.1	5.1	8.1	3.0
3–6 Feb	EMG	30.2	24.7	11.1	6.5	5.3	9.2	1.2	4.4	7.4	5.5
3–4 Feb	CFI Group	30.8	30.4	9.0	5.7	5.2	6.8	0.9	6.3	4.9	0.4
3 Feb	IPR	29.5	25.5	12.0	6.5	5.5	7.5	1.0	4.5	8.0	4.0
1 Feb	Ipsos	27.0	25.5	11.8	6.0	6.5	9.4	2.2	5.3	6.3	1.5
31 Jan	IPR	29.5	25.5	12.0	6.3	5.5	7.5	1.0	4.9	7.8	4.0
27–30 Jan	EMG	29.7	23.8	10.7	6.7	5.6	8.8	1.5	5.3	7.9	5.9
27–28 Jan	CFI Group	30.0	29.6	9.8	5.2	5.8	7.0	1.0	6.5	5.1	0.4
26 Jan	GPG	27.0	23.6	12.1	5.8	5.0	7.9	2.4	4.6	11.6	3.4
24–26 Jan	Crespi	27.0	23.0	11.0	7.2	5.3	8.5	1.8	7.0	9.2	4.0
24–25 Jan	ISPO	30.0	24.6	10.6	6.9	5.6	7.3	1.7	5.3	8.0	5.4
24–25 Jan	Lorien	28.6	25.3	11.3	7.3	6.2	8.2	2.9	5.2	5.0	3.3
24 Jan	Piepoli	31.5	25.5	10.5	6.5	5.0	7.0	2.0	3.0	9.0	6.0
21–24 Jan	SWG	26.5	24.0	12.0	5.5	5.0	8.0	3.0	8.0	8.0	2.5
7–24 Jan	Tecnè	32.8	28.6	8.7	5.3	6.0	3.3		3.9	11.4	4.2
21–22 Jan	Digis	29.4	24.3	11.9	6.6	6.0	7.1	2.2	5.3	7.2	5.1
21 Jan	Ipsos	27.0	25.3	11.7	5.9	6.8	9.2	2.0	5.4	6.7	1.7
20–21 Jan	CFI Group	30.2	30.1	9.6	5.4	5.0	7.1	0.9	7.0	4.7	0.1
18–21 Jan	Euromedia	32.0	25.0	12.0	6.5	6.0	5.5	2.0	3.5	7.5	7.0
19–20 Jan	ISPO	30.2	24.5	10.5	6.8	5.5	7.5	1.8	5.2	8.0	5.7
18–20 Jan	EMG	28.6	23.2	10.9	7.1	5.9	9.1	1.6	5.9	7.7	5.4
17 Jan	Piepoli	31.5	25.0	10.5	6.5	5.5	6.5	2.0	3.0	9.5	6.5
13–14 Jan	Lorien	30.2	24.8	11.4	6.7	6.0	7.7	2.6	5.0	5.6	5.4
13–14 Jan	CFI Group	31.4	28.9	9.7	5.3	5.5	5.7	0.9	7.5	5.1	2.5
11–13 Jan	EMG	30.0	24.3	11.2	6.3	6.0	7.4	1.9	5.7	7.2	5.7
11–12 Jan	ScenariPolitici	28.5	22.7	11.9	5.2	5.1	7.7	3.0	4.1	11.8	5.8
6–7 Jan	CFI Group	30.0	26.2	10.4	5.0	6.0	5.6	1.8	8.1	6.9	3.8

=== 2010 ===
Date	Polling firm	PdL	PD	LN	UdC	IdV	SEL	M5S	FLI	Others	Lead
28 Dec	GPG	27.3	23.4	12.0	5.7	5.2	7.3	2.6	4.8	11.7	3.9
18–21 Dec	Demos&Pi	28.6	25.1	11.6	6.9	6.0	7.8	2.7	5.3	6.0	3.5
18–20 Dec	Demopolis	28.0	25.0	12.5	7.3	5.5	8.0	2.5	5.0	6.2	3.0
18–19 Dec	IPR	29.5	26.5	12.0	6.0	5.0	7.5	1.5	4.0	8.0	3.0
18–19 Dec	IPR	29.0	25.5	12.0	6.5	5.0	6.5	2.0	4.5	9.0	3.5
17–18 Dec	Digis	30.7	25.1	11.5	6.6	5.8	6.4	2.0	4.9	7.0	5.6
17 Dec	Ipsos	27.2	24.7	12.4	5.8	7.5	7.9	2.5	5.9	6.1	2.5
16–17 Dec	CFI Group	31.6	27.9	10.4	5.1	5.4	5.1	1.0	8.3	5.2	3.7
16 Dec	IPR	29.5	26.0	12.0	6.5	5.0	6.5	2.0	4.5	8.0	3.5
15–16 Dec	Lorien	29.9	24.2	11.7	6.9	6.2	7.0	2.6	5.5	6.0	5.7
14–16 Dec	EMG	30.3	24.7	11.4	6.2	5.1	7.9	2.2	5.4	6.8	5.6
14–16 Dec	Demopolis	28.5	25.0	12.2	6.8	5.0	8.0	2.5	5.3	6.7	3.5
14 Dec	Euromedia	30.2	25.2	12.8	6.8	5.8	4.5	2.5	4.2	8.0	5.0
14 Dec	ISPO	31.8	24.6	10.7	6.2	5.5	5.8	3.1	4.1	8.2	7.2
9–10 Dec	CFI Group	32.5	30.0	8.7	3.3	6.3	4.5	0.4	10.1	4.2	2.5
7–10 Dec	Coesis	29.8	26.9	10.2	6.6	6.0	5.4	2.0	4.5	8.6	2.9
1–10 Dec	Tecnè	34.4	27.9	8.2	5.5	6.3	3.5		3.6	10.6	6.5
9 Dec	IPR	29.0	26.0	12.0	7.5	4.5	6.0	1.5	5.5	8.0	3.0
7–9 Dec	ISPO	27.6	25.0	12.0	5.3	6.2	6.4	2.2	6.9	8.4	2.6
7–9 Dec	EMG	28.9	25.3	11.4	6.6	4.7	7.7	2.0	5.9	7.5	3.6
6–8 Dec	Lorien	28.2	23.0	12.7	6.8	7.6	7.3	2.1	6.2	6.1	5.2
5–7 Dec	Demopolis	26.0	24.0	12.5	6.7	6.0	8.0	2.5	7.3	7.0	2.0
6 Dec	Ipsos	27.4	24.1	11.6	5.6	7.4	7.8	2.4	6.9	6.8	3.3
3 Dec	GPG	26.3	22.3	12.7	5.6	5.5	7.6	2.9	5.8	11.3	4.0
2–3 Dec	CFI Group	32.2	26.3	11.2	5.7	3.8	5.5	0.3	10.3	4.7	5.9
30 Nov–2 Dec	EMG	28.2	25.0	11.7	6.9	5.2	7.9	2.2	6.0	6.9	3.2
29–30 Nov	Crespi	26.3	23.0	12.2	6.7	6.7	7.2	2.0	8.2	7.7	3.3
29 Nov	Ipsos	27.1	23.6	11.7	5.8	7.6	8.0	2.5	7.1	6.6	3.5
26–27 Nov	Digis	26.7	24.0	12.4	6.1	6.8	6.5	3.0	7.5	7.0	2.7
26–27 Nov	Euromedia	29.1	24.5	12.6	6.2	6.6	4.3	2.5	5.4	8.8	4.6
25–26 Nov	CFI Group	30.1	27.0	11.1	3.9	5.9	5.3	2.1	8.3	6.3	3.1
23–26 Nov	ScenariPolitici	27.9	21.9	11.7	5.4	5.9	7.1	2.6	6.0	11.5	6.0
23–25 Nov	EMG	28.5	24.8	11.9	6.5	5.6	7.3	2.4	6.0	7.0	3.7
22 Nov	Ipsos	26.6	23.8	12.2	6.2	7.4	7.9	2.8	6.7	6.4	2.8
18–19 Nov	CFI Group	28.5	25.6	10.7	4.0	7.2	6.2	2.6	8.2	7.0	2.9
16–18 Nov	EMG	27.8	25.2	12.2	6.2	5.9	6.5	2.5	6.1	7.6	2.6
15–17 Nov	Lorien	27.1	24.5	12.3	6.2	7.9	6.6	3.4	7.0	5.0	2.6
16 Nov	Crespi	26.0	23.0	12.5	6.3	6.1	6.0	3.0	8.8	8.3	3.0
13–16 Nov	Demos&Pi	26.3	24.8	10.4	6.7	6.8	6.6	3.6	8.1	6.7	1.5
15 Nov	Piepoli	31.0	25.5	10.5	5.5	5.5	6.5	2.5	5.0	8.0	5.5
15 Nov	Ipsos	26.3	23.3	11.8	6.3	7.6	7.6	3.3	7.3	6.5	3.0
11–15 Nov	IPR	28.5	26.0	12.5	7.0	5.0	4.5	2.5	5.5	8.5	2.5
12–13 Nov	Euromedia	29.0	24.5	13.0	7.0	7.0	4.0	2.5	5.0	8.0	4.5
12–13 Nov	Digis	26.9	24.2	12.3	6.1	6.5	5.9	2.8	7.6	7.7	2.7
11–12 Nov	CFI Group	28.1	26.6	10.9	3.8	6.9	5.8	2.2	8.4	7.3	1.5
10–12 Nov	SWG	24.5	24.5	12.5	5.0	5.5	6.5	4.5	8.0	9.0	0.0
10–11 Nov	ISPO	26.5	24.2	11.8	5.8	6.3	6.7	2.1	8.1	8.5	2.3
9–11 Nov	EMG	28.5	25.9	11.4	6.1	5.8	6.0	2.7	5.9	7.7	2.6
10 Nov	GPG	26.0	23.3	12.8	5.5	6.0	6.4	2.9	6.0	11.1	2.7
8–9 Nov	Crespi	26.0	23.0	13.0	6.0	5.7	5.7	3.1	9.2	8.3	3.0
7–9 Nov	Demopolis	27.0	23.5	13.0	6.7	7.0	6.5	2.5	7.8	6.0	3.5
8 Nov	Ipsos	26.5	23.4	11.6	5.8	7.6	7.0	4.0	7.7	6.4	3.1
7–8 Nov	Euromedia	29.0	25.0	13.5	6.5	7.0	4.0	3.0	3.0	9.0	4.0
5–6 Nov	Digis	27.7	24.4	12.3	6.0	6.7	5.2	3.0	6.9	7.8	3.3
4–5 Nov	CFI Group	29.6	25.2	10.5	4.4	7.0	5.9	2.1	7.7	7.6	4.4
4 Nov	IPR	28.5	26.5	12.0	6.5	5.5	3.5	2.5	5.0	10.0	2.0
2–4 Nov	SWG	24.0	24.5	13.0	4.5	5.0	7.0	4.5	9.0	8.5	0.5
2–4 Nov	EMG	28.7	25.9	11.7	6.5	6.0	5.4	2.2	5.4	8.2	2.8
2 Nov	Ipsos	28.3	24.4	11.8	6.0	8.0	6.0	3.6	5.7	6.2	3.9
28 Oct–2 Nov	AnalisiPolitica	28.9	25.3	12.1	5.8	6.5	5.1	2.8	5.8	7.7	3.6
29 Oct–1 Nov	Crespi	27.0	24.5	13.5	6.2	5.8	4.8	2.2	8.0	8.0	2.5
25–30 Oct	Coesis	30.5	28.0	9.0	7.0	6.0	5.0		3.5	11.0	2.5
29 Oct	Euromedia	30.0	25.0	13.0	6.5	6.5	4.0	2.5	3.5	9.0	5.0
28–29 Oct	CFI Group	27.2	24.4	10.9	4.3	7.8	6.1	2.5	8.1	8.7	2.8
27–28 Oct	ISPO	27.9	25.5	12.5	6.0	6.4	5.4	2.5	6.0	7.8	2.4
26–28 Oct	EMG	28.8	25.7	11.9	6.5	6.1	4.8	2.4	5.7	8.1	3.1
25–28 Oct	ScenariPolitici	27.3	22.8	11.4	5.3	6.4	5.9	2.7	6.9	11.3	4.5
10–28 Oct	Ipsos	29.5	24.0	11.3	6.0	8.2	6.0	3.7	5.1	6.2	5.5
25 Oct	Ipsos	29.0	24.2	11.3	6.0	8.3	6.1	3.7	5.3	6.1	4.8
24–25 Oct	Euromedia	30.0	25.2	12.7	6.2	7.0	4.8	2.8	3.3	8.0	4.8
22–25 Oct	Crespi	27.8	25.0	13.5	6.0	5.0	4.5	2.5	7.4	8.3	2.8
21–22 Oct	CFI Group	28.0	26.8	10.5	4.1	7.8	6.2	3.9	7.6	5.1	1.2
19–21 Oct	EMG	28.9	26.4	11.8	6.1	5.8	4.4	2.5	6.0	8.1	2.5
18–20 Oct	SWG	26.5	24.0	12.0	5.5	6.5	6.5	4.5	7.0	7.5	2.5
15–18 Oct	Crespi	28.0	25.4	14.0	5.8	5.0	4.0	2.8	8.0	7.0	2.6
4–18 Oct	Lorien	28.5	26.1	13.4	6.5	7.0	4.7	3.0	4.8	6.0	2.4
14–15 Oct	CFI Group	28.2	25.1	11.9	4.0	7.4	5.6	1.7	8.6	7.5	3.1
12–14 Oct	EMG	29.5	26.0	12.1	5.9	5.5	4.4	2.6	6.1	7.9	3.5
12 Oct	GPG	27.8	24.0	12.3	5.3	6.1	5.1	3.4	5.6	10.4	3.8
8–11 Oct	Crespi	28.2	25.0	13.8	6.0	5.2	3.8	3.0	8.0	7.0	3.2
7–8 Oct	CFI Group	29.8	22.7	10.7	5.0	7.7	6.2	1.5	8.7	7.7	7.1
4 Oct	Ipsos	29.0	25.0	12.1	5.8	7.3	5.2	4.0	5.2	6.4	4.0
4 Oct	ISPO	29.0	24.9	12.9	5.0	6.4	6.8	2.0	7.9	5.1	4.1
1–4 Oct	Crespi	28.5	24.2	13.5	6.0	5.5	4.0	3.4	7.6	7.3	4.3
1–2 Oct	Euromedia	30.9	24.7	12.1	6.3	8.1	4.7	1.7	2.9	8.6	6.2
30 Sep–1 Oct	CFI Group	30.2	23.1	9.5	4.3	6.6	6.8	1.2	7.9	10.4	7.1
30 Sep–1 Oct	IPR	30.0	25.0	12.0	7.0	6.0	3.0	2.5	4.5	10.0	5.0
27–29 Sep	ScenariPolitici	29.2	24.6	10.7	6.3	6.1	4.6	2.5	6.2	9.8	4.6
27 Sep	Crespi	29.0	25.5	12.3	6.0	6.5	4.0	2.5	7.0	7.2	3.5
23–24 Sep	CFI Group	27.0	23.1	11.6	5.5	7.9	4.9	2.6	8.2	9.2	3.9
17–20 Sep	Crespi	29.0	25.0	12.7	6.0	6.2	4.2	1.5	7.5	7.9	4.0
18 Sep	GPG	28.6	25.1	12.8	5.7	6.5	4.4	2.8	5.1	9.0	3.5
16 Sep	IPR	30.0	24.0	11.5	7.0	5.0	3.0	2.5	5.0	12.0	6.0
10–15 Sep	Demopolis	29.0	26.5	13.0	7.0	6.0	4.5		7.5	6.5	2.5
13 Sep	Ipsos	29.4	25.7	12.4	6.2	7.9	5.1	2.0	5.8	5.5	3.7
10–11 Sep	Euromedia	32.0	25.0	13.2	5.9	7.9			3.9	12.1	7.0
8–10 Sep	ISPO	30.7	25.7	11.5	5.9	5.5			7.2	13.5	5.0
7–10 Sep	Demos&Pi	29.8	26.5	11.0	6.3	5.5	4.7	3.6	6.1	6.5	3.3
7–9 Sep	SWG	27.0	25.0	12.5	5.0	6.0	5.0	4.0	7.0	8.5	2.0
6–8 Sep	Crespi	30.0	24.6	12.3	6.5	6.5	4.0	1.6	6.9	7.6	5.4
5 Sep	GPG	28.5	24.7	12.9	5.6	6.6	4.0	2.5	4.1	11.1	3.8
3–4 Sep	Digis	30.6	26.9	11.7	6.0	7.1	3.2	1.3	5.3	7.9	3.7
1–2 Sep	ISPO	29.7	26.7	11.5	6.4	6.3	4.5	1.0	6.3	7.6	3.0
27 Aug–1 Sep	Lorien	29.9	27.0	14.1	6.3	6.9	4.5	2.1	4.3	4.9	2.9
23–25 Aug	Crespi	30.0	24.0	12.3	6.5	6.5	4.5	1.6	7.0	7.6	6.0
16 Aug	GPG	27.2	25.6	12.7	6.1	6.0	4.4	2.8	4.4	10.8	1.6
2–4 Aug	ScenariPolitici	28.4	24.2	10.6	6.2	5.9	3.9	2.6	8.3	9.9	4.2
1 Aug	GPG	27.1	25.4	12.7	6.2	6.2	4.3	3.2	4.3	10.6	1.7
23–28 Jul	Crespi	28.5	25.0	12.0	6.0	6.5	5.5		9.5	7.0	3.5
18–25 Jul	Demopolis	33.0	27.0	13.0	7.0	7.5	4.5		Did not exist	8.0	6.0
23–24 Jul	Digis	34.2	28.2	11.5	6.5	7.4	3.8		Did not exist	8.4	6.0
20 Jul	Ipsos	33.0	26.0	12.0	5.5	8.0	3.0		Did not exist	12.5	7.0
14–19 Jul	Lorien	32.2	27.1	13.1	6.1	7.9	3.4	3.1	Did not exist	7.1	5.1
16–17 Jul	Digis	34.7	28.2	11.6	6.6	7.3	3.7		Did not exist	7.9	6.5
15 Jul	GPG	29.8	26.3	12.5	6.5	6.3	4.0	3.3	Did not exist	11.3	3.5
28 Jun–3 Jul	ScenariPolitici	31.3	25.6	11.7	6.7	6.6	4.1	2.6	Did not exist	11.4	5.7
26 Jun	GPG	30.4	26.4	12.7	6.3	6.5	3.8	3.8	Did not exist	10.1	4.0
18–20 Jun	Ipsos	34.2	26.1	12.5	5.4	8.2	3.5	3.0	Did not exist	7.1	8.1
17 Jun	GPG	30.3	26.1	13.5	5.9	7.1	3.5	3.6	Did not exist	10.0	4.2
6–9 Jun	Demos&Pi	33.2	27.0	12.1	7.4	8.1	3.3		Did not exist	8.9	6.2
2 Jun	GPG	30.1	25.6	13.4	5.8	7.5	3.5	3.4	Did not exist	10.7	4.5
10–30 May	ScenariPolitici	32.1	24.6	12.7	6.6	7.5	3.3	2.6	Did not exist	10.6	7.5
13 May	GPG	31.0	24.8	13.7	5.7	7.4	3.5	3.1	Did not exist	10.8	6.2
3 May	Ipsos	35.1	27.0	11.9	5.1	8.8	3.3		Did not exist	8.8	8.1
24 Apr	GPG	31.4	25.2	12.9	5.9	6.8	3.5	3.7	Did not exist	10.6	6.2
23–24 Apr	Digis	37.0	27.5	11.5	5.7	7.2	3.3		Did not exist	7.8	9.5
1–15 Apr	ScenariPolitici	32.8	25.5	11.2	6.9	7.0	3.9	3.8	Did not exist	8.9	7.3
8 Apr	GPG	32.3	25.8	12.1	6.0	6.6	3.1	3.0	Did not exist	11.1	6.5
11 Mar	GPG	32.5	26.8	12.5	6.8	6.5	2.9	1.5	Did not exist	10.5	5.7
9–11 Mar	Digis	35.9	28.9	10.6	6.8	7.8	1.8		Did not exist	8.2	7.0
10 Mar	ISPO	37.1	30.0	10.5	5.7	6.9	2.0		Did not exist	7.8	7.1
1–5 Mar	TP	36.0	28.1	11.1	6.6	6.9	2.5		Did not exist	8.8	7.9
25 Feb–1 Mar	Crespi	36.5	28.0	11.5	6.7	6.7	2.1		Did not exist	8.5	8.5
23–26 Feb	Demos&Pi	36.8	28.0	10.1	6.8	7.4	2.4		Did not exist	8.5	8.8
25 Feb	Ipsos	37.2	29.8	10.8	5.7	7.2	2.3		Did not exist	7.0	7.4
22 Feb	Ipsos	36.6	29.2	10.1	6.0	6.7	3.0		Did not exist	8.4	7.4
18–22 Feb	Crespi	37.0	28.0	11.5	6.5	6.5	2.0		Did not exist	8.5	9.0
9–22 Feb	Lorien	35.7	28.1	10.6	6.1	7.3	3.6		Did not exist	8.6	7.6
11–15 Feb	Crespi	37.5	28.0	11.5	6.2	6.3	2.0		Did not exist	8.5	9.5
11–14 Feb	SWG	34.0	28.0	11.5	5.0	8.5	4.0		Did not exist	9.0	6.0
11 Feb	GPG	34.3	25.8	11.9	6.5	6.2	3.0	1.0	Did not exist	11.3	8.5
4–8 Feb	Crespi	38.0	27.3	11.0	6.5	6.8	2.0		Did not exist	8.4	10.7
2–7 Feb	SpinCon	38.1	27.7	11.2	6.7	6.1	1.7	0.5	Did not exist	8.0	10.4
5–6 Feb	Digis	38.6	28.7	10.6	6.3	6.4	2.4		Did not exist	7.0	9.9
3–4 Feb	ISPO	38.0	27.5	9.6	6.5	7.5	3.0		Did not exist	7.9	10.5
1 Feb	Ipsos	38.2	29.7	10.5	5.7	6.6	2.7		Did not exist	6.6	8.5
29–30 Jan	Euromedia	39.3	28.9	9.8	6.2	6.1	2.5		Did not exist	7.2	10.4
27–29 Jan	Crespi	38.0	27.5	11.0	6.7	6.2	1.7		Did not exist	8.9	10.5
28 Jan	GPG	34.2	25.0	12.4	7.3	6.0	2.8	1.1	Did not exist	11.2	9.2
28 Jan	Ipsos	38.1	29.5	10.5	5.9	7.0	2.6		Did not exist	6.4	8.6
27 Jan	IPR	37.5	27.0	11.0	6.5	7.0	3.5		Did not exist	7.5	10.5
26–27 Jan	Digis	39.2	28.8	10.1	6.6	6.7	2.1		Did not exist	6.5	10.4
25 Jan	Ipsos	38.5	29.5	10.2	6.2	6.8	2.0		Did not exist	6.8	9.0
21–25 Jan	Crespi	38.5	27.7	10.5	6.5	6.0	1.5		Did not exist	9.3	10.8
22–23 Jan	Digis	39.0	28.5	10.5	6.3	6.8	2.0		Did not exist	6.9	10.5
11 Jan	Ipsos	39.0	29.3	9.8	6.2	7.2	2.2		Did not exist	6.3	9.7
7–11 Jan	SWG	35.0	26.5	11.5	5.5	9.0	4.0		Did not exist	8.5	8.5
10 Jan	GPG	34.3	26.5	11.8	7.2	6.5	1.6	1.0	Did not exist	11.1	7.8
8–9 Jan	Digis	39.0	28.5	10.0	7.0	7.5	1.5		Did not exist	6.5	10.5

=== 2009 ===
Date	Polling firm	PdL	PD	LN	UdC	IdV	SEL	M5S	Others	Lead
21 Dec	Euromedia	40.1	29.7	9.1	6.0	6.4	1.9		6.8	10.4
18–19 Dec	Digis	39.5	29.0	11.0	6.0	7.0	1.5		6.0	10.5
17 Dec	Euromedia	39.2	29.5	9.1	5.9	6.5	2.2		7.6	9.7
14 Dec	Ipsos	39.6	30.0	9.3	6.5	6.9	2.0		5.7	9.6
12 Dec	GPG	33.0	27.4	12.6	7.6	6.8	2.1	0.9	9.6	5.6
3–4 Dec	Lorien	35.4	28.2	12.2	6.5	7.0	2.5		8.2	7.2
24–30 Nov	SpinCon	37.7	28.0	9.6	7.5	6.1	1.7	0.6	8.8	9.7
27–28 Nov	Digis	38.2	29.1	10.4	7.5	7.0	1.7		6.1	9.1
27 Nov	Ipsos	38.0	30.5	10.3	6.0	7.4	1.9		5.9	7.5
23 Nov	Ipsos	38.4	30.8	10.2	6.3	7.3	1.9		5.1	7.6
14–23 Nov	SpinCon	37.5	27.9	9.5	7.2	6.1	2.1	0.6	9.1	9.6
18–19 Nov	ISPO	38.2	27.9	8.5	6.8	7.7	2.6		8.3	10.3
26 Oct–16 Nov	Piepoli	38.5	27.5	9.5	6.5	7.0	3.0		8.0	11.0
16 Nov	GPG	32.2	24.9	12.2	7.1	6.5	2.6	1.5	13.0	7.3
13 Nov	Euromedia	38.5	27.8	9.8	7.0	7.3	2.1		7.5	10.7
2–11 Nov	SpinCon	37.8	28.6	10.7	6.8	6.4	1.9		7.8	9.2
9 Nov	Ipsos	38.8	30.2	9.9	6.8	7.6	2.2		4.5	8.6
6–7 Nov	Digis	39.5	29.0	9.5	7.2	7.8	1.3		5.7	10.5
2–3 Nov	Crespi	38.0	28.0	10.0	7.0	7.0	1.2	1.5	7.3	10.0
26 Oct	Ipsos	38.7	30.0	10.0	6.6	7.8			6.9	8.7
23–24 Oct	Digis	39.5	29.0	10.2	5.9	8.3	1.3		5.8	10.5
16–17 Oct	Digis	40.0	28.5	10.0	6.0	8.5	1.5		5.5	11.5
2–5 Oct	Euromedia	38.1	26.5	9.9	6.5	8.4	2.8		7.8	11.6
1–2 Oct	Crespi	39.0	27.0	10.0	6.3	6.0	1.7	3.0	7.0	12.0
28 Sep	Ipsos	37.5	29.3	10.1	6.7	8.1		Did not exist	8.3	8.2
3–7 Sep	Crespi	38.0	26.0	11.0	6.5	8.0	2.0	Did not exist	8.5	12.0
4–5 Sep	Digis	38.0	25.0	11.5	6.0	8.5	2.5	Did not exist	8.5	13.0
24–27 Jul	Crespi	38.0	25.5	10.0	6.9	8.5	2.1	Did not exist	9.0	12.5
17–18 Jul	Digis	39.0	24.5	11.0	6.0	8.5	3.0	Did not exist	8.0	14.5
6–7 Jun 2009	EP Election	35.3	26.1	10.2	6.5	8.0	3.1	Did not exist	10.8	9.2
18–20 May	Digis	40.2	25.9	9.1	5.2	7.8	3.6	Did not exist	8.2	14.3
18–20 May	Lorien	39.7	27.4	9.6	6.6	7.2	3.0	Did not exist	6.5	12.3
17–20 May	TP	38.5	26.2	9.6	5.5	6.1	3.1	Did not exist	11.0	12.3
16–20 May	Demopolis	40.0	26.0	10.0	5.8	8.0	2.5	Did not exist	7.7	14.0
18–19 May	ISPO	38.5	27.0	9.5	6.5	8.5	2.0	Did not exist	8.0	11.5
18–19 May	Crespi	40.0	25.7	10.3	6.0	7.2	2.4	Did not exist	8.4	14.3
18 May	Ipsos	39.6	26.9	9.8	6.3	9.2	2.6	Did not exist	5.6	12.7
15–17 May	Digis	40.8	26.1	8.5	4.8	7.5	3.5	Did not exist	8.8	14.7
12–15 May	Demos&Pi	38.8	25.7	10.1	7.2	8.2	3.1	Did not exist	6.9	13.1
12–15 May	Lorien	39.9	26.3	9.4	6.8	7.6	3.4	Did not exist	6.6	13.6
10–13 May	Demopolis	40.0	25.5	10.5	6.0	7.5	2.8	Did not exist	7.7	14.5
10–12 May	TP	39.8	26.5	9.5	5.3	6.6	1.9	Did not exist	10.4	13.3
11 May	Ipsos	39.9	26.0	9.2	6.4	9.4	2.9	Did not exist	6.2	13.9
11 May	Piepoli	41.0	29.5	8.5	5.5	7.0		Did not exist	8.5	11.5
8–11 May	Crespi	41.0	25.5	10.0	6.0	7.0	2.2	Did not exist	8.3	15.5
8–10 May	Digis	40.1	25.0	9.5	6.0	8.2	3.0	Did not exist	8.2	15.1
8 May	Euromedia	43.0	25.3	10.0	5.5	6.4	2.8	Did not exist	7.0	17.7
5–8 May	Lorien	40.7	25.5	9.2	6.6	7.3	3.7	Did not exist	7.0	15.2
2–7 May	PoliticaLink	38.5	27.0	10.5	6.0	7.2	2.8	Did not exist	8.0	11.5
30 Apr–7 May	TP	37.4	26.9	9.8	5.6	7.7	3.1	Did not exist	9.5	10.5
5 May	Ipsos	40.0	26.5	9.4	6.4	9.0	2.9	Did not exist	5.8	13.5
30 Apr–2 May	Digis	40.2	25.0	10.4	5.8	8.4	2.2	Did not exist	8.0	15.2
28–30 Apr	Crespi	41.5	25.0	10.0	5.7	7.0	2.2	Did not exist	8.6	16.5
24–30 Apr	PoliticaLink	39.2	26.8	10.0	6.0	7.5	2.7	Did not exist	7.8	12.4
29 Apr	Ipsos	40.0	26.2	10.3	6.0	9.0	2.5	Did not exist	6.0	13.8
22–29 Apr	TP	38.1	25.4	10.3	6.1	7.3	3.4	Did not exist	9.4	12.7
26–28 Apr	Demopolis	41.0	26.0	9.5	6.5	7.5	3.0	Did not exist	6.5	15.0
24–26 Apr	Digis	39.8	25.3	10.6	5.8	8.2	2.1	Did not exist	8.2	14.5
19–26 Apr	TP	39.8	26.9	9.7	6.0	5.9	2.8	Did not exist	8.9	12.9
20–22 Apr	Crespi	43.0	24.0	9.0	5.0	6.0	2.5	Did not exist	10.5	19.0
14–21 Apr	Lorien	41.1	25.4	9.4	6.3	7.1	3.6	Did not exist	7.1	15.7
20 Apr	Ipsos	39.5	26.2	9.7	5.6	9.2	3.0	Did not exist	6.8	13.3
17–18 Apr	Digis	40.0	25.0	10.5	5.8	7.7	2.2	Did not exist	8.8	15.0
9–10 Apr	Digis	40.5	25.0	10.3	6.0	7.8	2.0	Did not exist	8.4	15.5
18 Mar–2 Apr	ISPO	42.2	25.1					Did not exist	32.7	17.1
25–31 Mar	Lorien	40.4	25.7	9.5	6.7	7.4	3.1	Did not exist	7.2	14.7
27–28 Mar	Digis	40.8	24.8	10.2	6.0	8.0	2.0	Did not exist	8.2	16.0
23–24 Mar	AnalisiPolitica	38.6	24.5	9.5	7.5	9.1	2.6	Did not exist	8.2	14.1
23 Mar	Euromedia	43.1	22.4	10.7	5.0	7.3	2.4	Did not exist	9.1	20.7
20–23 Mar	Crespi	40.0	23.2	11.0	6.0	7.0	3.8	Did not exist	9.0	16.8
18–23 Mar	Demos&Pi	38.7	26.2	9.2	7.0	8.6	2.8	Did not exist	7.5	12.5
20–21 Mar	Digis	39.5	24.2	11.0	5.8	8.3	2.7	Did not exist	8.5	15.3
16 Mar	Ipsos	37.5	25.3	10.8	6.2	9.7	3.4	Did not exist	7.1	12.2
13–14 Mar	Euromedia	42.1	22.5	9.1	5.5	7.5	2.1	Did not exist	11.2	19.6
13–14 Mar	Digis	39.7	24.0	11.0	6.0	8.5	2.5	Did not exist	8.3	15.7
5–10 Mar	Coesis	41.0	23.0	9.0	6.0	8.0	6.0	Did not exist	7.0	18.0
4–6 Mar	Crespi	38.5	23.5	11.0	7.0	8.0	3.3	Did not exist	8.7	15.0
27–28 Feb	Euromedia	42.0	22.0	10.0	5.9	7.5	3.7	Did not exist	8.9	20.0
27–28 Feb	Digis	39.5	23.5	11.3	6.5	9.5	2.5	Did not exist	7.2	16.0
26–27 Feb	IPR	36.0	22.0	9.5	8.0	8.0	6.0	Did not exist	10.5	14.0
23 Feb	Ipsos	37.3	24.3	10.9	6.3	9.7		Did not exist	11.5	13.0
20–21 Feb	Digis	39.7	24.0	11.3	6.0	10.0	2.0	Did not exist	7.0	15.7
19–20 Feb	Crespi	42.0	21.8	10.0	6.2	8.0	3.5	Did not exist	8.5	20.2
20–22 Jan	Crespi	39.6	26.3	11.0	5.5	6.0	Did not exist	Did not exist	11.6	13.3
12 Jan	Ipsos	38.2	25.0	11.2	6.0	9.5	Did not exist	Did not exist	10.1	13.2
7–8 Jan	SWG	38.0	24.0	8.5	4.5	8.5	Did not exist	Did not exist	16.5	14.0
4 Jan	Piepoli	41.0	29.5	9.5	6.0	6.5	Did not exist	Did not exist	7.5	11.5

=== 2008 ===
Date	Polling firm	PdL	PD	LN	UdC	IdV	Others	Lead
18–19 Dec	Crespi	40.0	27.5	11.5	5.0	7.5	8.5	12.5
15–19 Dec	Demos&Pi	37.6	27.5	9.7	5.6	9.3	10.3	10.1
15 Dec	Ipsos	37.2	27.1	10.8	6.1	9.8	9.0	10.1
7 Dec	Piepoli	42.0	33.5	9.5	4.5	5.0	5.5	8.5
24 Nov–7 Dec	GfK Eurisko	39.4	29.5	8.2	5.0	8.3	9.6	9.9
20 Nov–4 Dec	IPR	39.0	28.0	7.5	4.0	7.8	13.7	11.0
1 Dec	Piepoli	41.5	34.0	9.5	4.5	5.0	5.5	7.5
24 Nov	Piepoli	41.0	34.0	9.5	4.5	5.0	6.0	7.0
17 Nov	Piepoli	41.0	34.0	9.5	4.5	5.0	6.0	7.0
10 Nov	Piepoli	41.0	34.0	9.0	4.5	4.5	7.0	7.0
3 Nov	Piepoli	42.0	31.3	8.0	4.5	5.5	8.7	10.7
3 Nov	Ipsos	35.1	30.9	10.0	5.3	8.8	9.9	4.2
27 Oct	Piepoli	41.5	32.5	9.0	5.0	5.0	7.0	9.0
24–25 Oct	Euromedia	40.1	29.8	9.5	3.8	5.7	11.1	10.3
20 Oct	Piepoli	42.0	33.0	8.5	5.0	5.5	6.0	9.0
13 Oct	Piepoli	41.5	32.5	9.0	5.0	5.0	7.0	9.0
10–11 Oct	Euromedia	42.7	28.8	9.3	4.1	5.4	9.7	13.9
6 Oct	Piepoli	42.5	32.0	8.5	5.0	5.0	7.0	10.5
3–5 Oct	Coesis	41.0	28.0	9.0	5.0	8.0	9.0	13.0
3–4 Oct	Digis	40.5	29.0	9.2	5.2	7.2	8.9	11.5
29–30 Sep	Pareto	39.8	27.8	8.8	4.7	6.1	12.8	12.0
29 Sep	Piepoli	42.0	31.0	9.0	5.0	6.0	7.0	11.0
29 Sep	Ipsos	36.6	29.2	10.5	6.0	8.1	9.6	7.4
26–27 Sep	Digis	40.7	28.2	9.3	4.9	7.7	9.2	12.5
22 Sep	Piepoli	42.0	32.0	9.0	5.0	5.5	6.5	10.0
19–20 Sep	Digis	40.2	28.0	9.5	4.7	7.8	9.8	12.2
15 Sep	Piepoli	42.0	32.0	9.0	5.0	5.5	6.5	10.0
12–13 Sep	Digis	41.5	28.0	9.0	4.5	8.0	9.0	13.5
8 Sep	Ipsos	37.2	29.0	10.3	5.6	8.0	9.9	8.2
5–6 Sep	Euromedia	42.0	28.1	9.0	4.7	4.5	11.7	13.9
3–4 Sep	Dinamiche	39.6	28.7	9.1	5.6	8.2	8.8	10.9
1 Sep	Piepoli	42.0	31.5	9.0	4.5	6.0	7.0	10.5
1 Sep	Crespi	42.0	28.0	9.0	4.0	8.0	9.0	14.0
4 Aug	Piepoli	42.0	31.5	9.0	4.5	5.5	7.5	10.5
25–31 Jul	Euromedia	41.4	29.1	9.0	4.5	4.3	11.7	12.3
25–28 Jul	Crespi	40.0	29.0	9.0	5.0	7.4	9.6	11.0
25–28 Jul	PoliticaLink	40.2	29.6	9.0	5.2	6.7	9.3	10.6
25–26 Jul	Digis	40.4	28.9	8.4	5.4	7.6	9.3	11.5
18–19 Jul	Digis	41.2	28.9	8.0	4.8	7.0	10.1	12.3
11–12 Jul	Digis	42.2	28.1	7.5	4.8	6.9	10.5	14.1
7 Jul	Piepoli	41.5	32.0	8.5	5.0	6.0	7.0	9.5
4–5 Jul	Digis	41.8	28.2	7.5	4.2	7.8	10.5	13.6
3–4 Jul	Dinamiche	40.1	30.0	8.7	5.2	6.2	9.8	10.1
3–4 Jul	Crespi	40.0	30.0	10.0	4.5	6.3	9.2	10.0
30 Jun	Piepoli	41.5	32.0	8.5	5.0	5.5	7.5	9.5
27 Jun	Euromedia	39.8	30.1	8.3	4.5	4.9	12.4	9.7
25 Jun	ISPO	44.6	28.0	7.8	4.9	7.4	7.3	16.6
13–14 Apr 2008	General election	37.4	33.2	8.3	5.6	4.4	11.1	4.2

== Coalition vote ==
=== Graphical summary ===
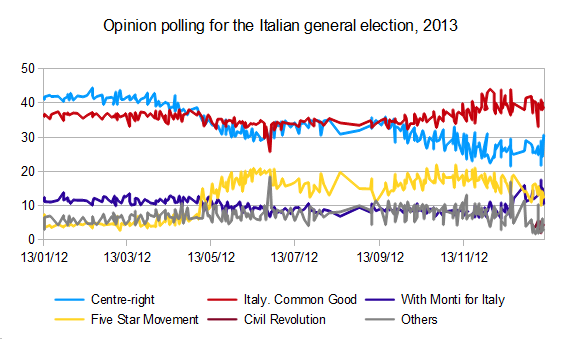
Opinion polling for the 2013 Italian general election, spanning 1 January through January 2012.

=== 2013 ===
The following table gathers the results of coalitions into one column, providing insight into the post-election balance of power.

Polling firm	Date	Five Star Movement	Civil Revolution	Italy. Common Good	With Monti for Italy	Centre-right coalition	Others
General election	24–25 Feb 2013	25.6	2.3	29.6	10.6	29.2	2.7
EMG	8 February 2013	16.0	3.5	35.0	14.1	28.5	2.9
IPR	8 February 2013	16.5	4.2	34.2	14.1	28.0	3.0
SWG	8 February 2013	18.8	4.1	33.8	13.4	27.8	2.1
Ipsos	8 February 2013	15.9	3.7	35.2	14.8	28.3	2.1
TP	8 February 2013	15.1	4.2	34.2	14.8	27.4	4.3
Quorum	8 February 2013	14.7	3.9	34.5	13.9	29.5	3.5
Demos	8 February 2013	16.0	4.0	34.1	16.0	28.6	1.3
ISPO	7 February 2013	14.3	4.2	37.2	12.9	29.7	1.7
Euromedia	7 February 2013	14.5	3.8	34.4	12.3	32.7	2.3
SpinCon	7 February 2013	12.5	5.9	32.2	11.2	29.8	8.4
Demopolis	6 February 2013	17.5	4.1	33.6	14.4	28.4	2.0
Tecnè	6 February 2013	16.3	5.2	33.1	12.6	29.4	3.4
SP	6 February 2013	14.9	5.5	34.0	10.2	28.0	7.4
Ipsos	5 February 2013	14.5	4.3	36.7	15.0	28.0	1.5
Tecnè	5 February 2013	16.1	4.9	33.3	13.0	29.3	3.6
ISPO	5 February 2013	16.4	3.9	34.9	12.5	29.8	2.5
Piepoli	5 February 2013	13.0	3.5	37.0	13.0	32.0	1.5
SWG	5 February 2013	18.0	4.9	33.6	13.3	28.1	2.1
Lorien	5 February 2013	14.8	4.7	35.2	13.4	29.8	2.1
IPR	4 February 2013	15.5	4.5	34.7	14.0	28.6	2.7
Datamonitor	4 February 2013	14.0	4.9	34.5	14.3	29.4	2.9
Piepoli	4 February 2013	11.0	4.0	37.0	15.0	30.0	3.0
Tecnè	4 February 2013	16.5	5.1	32.9	13.2	28.9	3.4
EMG	4 February 2013	14.5	4.6	35.9	14.6	27.9	2.5
ISPO	3 February 2013	13.6	4.6	36.6	14.6	28.1	2.5
Demopolis	2 February 2013	16.5	4.3	33.8	15.4	28.0	2.0
SpinCon	2 February 2013	11.5	5.8	32.3	11.5	30.5	8.4
Tecnè	1 February 2013	16.0	4.6	34.3	13.3	28.6	3.2
SWG	1 February 2013	18.0	5.0	32.8	14.2	27.8	2.2
TP	1 February 2013	15.8	5.0	33.3	14.8	26.8	4.3
Tecnè	31 January 2013	14.9	4.2	33.7	15.1	28.9	3.2
Quorum	31 January 2013	15.7	4.7	33.6	13.8	28.7	3.5
Lorien	31 January 2013	13.9	4.5	35.7	14.0	29.7	2.2
Tecnè	30 January 2013	13.6	4.8	33.8	15.2	28.6	4.0
Demos	30 January 2013	12.9	4.2	36.4	17.7	26.6	2.2
Ipsos	29 January 2013	13.6	4.8	37.6	15.4	26.8	1.8
Tecnè	29 January 2013	15.8	4.6	33.8	14.1	27.6	4.1
SP	29 January 2013	11.9	6.1	34.7	11.6	28.2	7.5
Datamonitor	29 January 2013	13.2	4.7	36.1	14.0	28.8	3.2
IPR	28 January 2013	14.6	4.7	35.4	14.8	28.0	2.5
EMG	28 January 2013	13.5	5.0	36.8	14.5	28.0	2.2
Euromedia	28 January 2013	13.1	3.5	35.0	12.9	32.4	3.1
Bidimedia	28 January 2013	13.8	4.4	37.0	12.4	28.5	3.9
Tecnè	27 January 2013	14.7	4.8	34.5	14.2	27.7	4.1
ISPO	27 January 2013	13.6	4.8	36.7	14.4	26.3	4.2
SpinCon	26 January 2013	11.2	6.2	32.5	12.2	30.7	7.2
SWG	25 January 2013	17.2	5.4	34.1	12.8	26.6	3.9
Piepoli	25 January 2013	10.0	4.0	39.0	15.0	31.0	1.0
TP	25 January 2013	15.0	4.3	35.1	14.3	27.2	4.1
Quorum	25 January 2013	14.2	4.5	35.2	14.6	27.4	4.1
Demos	25 January 2013	13.0	4.5	38.1	16.2	25.8	2.4
Lorien	25 January 2013	13.0	5.7	35.4	15.4	28.0	2.5
Tecnè	24 January 2013	14.0	4.4	35.2	15.0	27.6	3.8
Demopolis	24 January 2013	16.0	4.7	34.5	14.8	27.5	2.5
Tecnè	23 January 2013	14.5	4.7	34.8	15.1	27.6	3.3
SpinCon	23 January 2013	10.9	5.9	32.8	12.0	31.1	7.3
Ipsos	22 January 2013	12.8	4.6	38.5	16.0	26.5	1.6
Tecnè	22 January 2013	14.2	4.6	35.5	15.2	27.0	3.5
Datamonitor	22 January 2013	12.8	4.2	37.5	13.7	29.0	2.8
SP	22 January 2013	11.9	6.4	33.7	11.4	29.7	6.9
IPR	21 January 2013	13.3	4.3	36.0	14.3	28.5	3.6
ISPO	21 January 2013	13.6	4.6	37.7	13.9	27.3	2.9
Tecnè	21 January 2013	14.0	4.8	35.8	15.2	26.5	3.7
EMG	21 January 2013	12.8	4.6	37.1	15.2	28.0	2.3
Piepoli	21 January 2013	10.0	4.0	39.5	14.0	30.5	2.0
SpinCon	18 January 2013	10.7	5.6	32.0	12.2	31.8	7.7
SWG	18 January 2013	16.8	5.4	33.0	13.7	27.2	3.9
Tecnè	17 January 2013	13.6	4.5	36.9	15.3	26.0	3.7
Tecnè	16 January 2013	13.8	4.2	37.0	15.4	25.9	3.7
Piepoli	16 January 2013	10.0	4.0	40.0	14.0	30.0	2.0
Lorien	16 January 2013	12.5	5.6	36.5	15.6	27.0	2.8
Bidimedia	16 January 2013	13.6	5.0	38.1	12.3	27.3	3.7
Ipsos	15 January 2013	12.5	4.8	39.0	16.0	26.3	1.4
Euromedia	15 January 2013	10.5	4.0	38.3	11.0	34.2	2.0
Tecnè	15 January 2013	14.2	4.1	37.5	14.8	26.3	3.1
Datamonitor	15 January 2013	12.8	4.7	38.0	13.0	28.3	3.2
IPR	14 January 2013	12.0	4.0	36.5	15.0	28.5	4.0
ISPO	14 January 2013	12.6	4.4	36.3	15.5	29.2	2.0
EMG	14 January 2013	12.1	5.2	37.4	14.8	27.9	2.6
Tecnè	13 January 2013	14.3	4.3	37.8	14.5	26.0	3.1
Tecnè	11 January 2013	14.4	4.0	39.5	15.1	24.6	2.4
SWG	11 January 2013	15.9	4.5	34.9	13.8	25.3	5.6
Euromedia	10 January 2013	12.3	4.4	38.5	10.5	30.7	3.6
Tecnè	10 January 2013	14.0	4.4	39.3	15.2	24.5	2.6
Tecnè	9 January 2013	14.1	3.7	40.3	15.1	24.3	2.5
ISPO	9 January 2013	13.2	4.0	38.0	15.1	26.7	3.0
Lorien	9 January 2013	13.4	4.3	37.0	14.6	26.8	3.9
Piepoli	8 January 2013	10.0	4.0	41.0	14.0	29.0	2.0
Tecnè	8 January 2013	14.4	4.1	39.6	15.1	24.6	2.2
Ipsos	8 January 2013	12.5	5.5	39.8	17.6	23.1	1.5
IPR	8 January 2013	13.0	2.0	38.0	16.0	27.0	4.0
Tecnè	6 January 2013	15.7	3.4	39.9	14.3	24.8	1.9
ISPO	6 January 2013	13.5	2.5	39.5	14.0	27.5	3.0
SP	6 January 2013	13.0	5.7	33.0	13.1	27.6	7.6
Tecnè	4 January 2013	16.4	3.8	40.4	12.4	25.3	1.7
Tecnè	3 January 2013	16.3	3.7	40.3	12.0	25.8	1.9
Tecnè	2 January 2013	16.0	3.8	40.9	12.0	25.4	1.9
Piepoli	1 January 2013	11.0	5.0	42.0	12.0	28.0	2.0
