= Ecologists Association =

Ecologists Association (Associazione Ecologisti) was a small green and eco-socialist association in Italy.

It was founded in November 2009 by those members of the Federation of the Greens who wanted to continue the experience of Left and Freedom (SL), a left-wing coalition that was abandoned by the Greens in October, and took part to the foundation of Left Ecology Freedom (SEL) as a united party. Initially, the Ecologists were a minority faction within the Federation. Subsequently, they left the Greens to join Left Ecology Freedom.

== Leadership ==
- Spokesperson: Loredana De Petris
