= Socialism and Left =

Political party in Italy

Socialism and Left (Italian: Socialismo e Sinistra) was a small democratic-socialist political party in Italy.

In November 2009 the Socialist Party abandoned Left and Freedom (SL), a coalition of left-wing parties formed in the run-up of the 2009 European Parliament election. Subsequently a group of left-wing Socialists, led by Franco Bartolomei, launched Socialism and Left in order to continue the experience of SL and transform it into a united party, Left Ecology Freedom (SEL).

== Leadership ==
- Secretary: Franco Bartolomei (2009–?)
- President: Giorgio Pesce (2009–?)
