= Loredana De Petris =

Italian politician

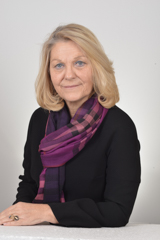

Member of Senate of the Republic
- In office 15 March 2013 – 13 October 2022
- Constituency: Lazio
- In office 30 May 2001 – 28 April 2008
- Constituency: Rome

Personal details
- Born: 24 November 1957 (age 68) Rome, Italy
- Party: DP (until 1989); FdV (1989–2009); SEL (2009–2016); SI (2016–2021)
- Education: Sapienza University of Rome

Loredana De Petris (born 24 November 1957) is an Italian politician and senator for four legislatures.

== Biography ==
=== From Proletarian Democracy to the Greens ===
De Petris began her political career in the 1980s joining Proletarian Democracy and has been active in the anti-nuclear and environmentalist movement, organizing the referendum against nuclear power, hunting and the use of pesticides in agriculture. At the 1987 elections she was a candidate for the Chamber of Deputies and obtained 4417 preferences without being elected. In 1989 was among the founders of the Federation of the Greens Lists and became a city councilor in Rome. In 1995 she was appointed Councilor for Environmental Policies by the Mayor Francesco Rutelli with the addition of the delegations to agricultural policies, the Centopiazze Office and the Office for the prevention of atmospheric pollution and civil protection.

At the political elections of 2001 De Petris was elected senator in the ranks of the centre-left Ulivo coalition, adhering to the parliamentary group of "The Greens - The Olive Tree". From 2001 to 2006, she is a member of the permanent commissions of the Senate for Finance and Agriculture, as well as the commission of inquiry on the waste cycle and consultative on the implementation of administrative reform. In 2005 she assumed the role of Councilor for the Environment for the Province of Rome and served as well on the promoting committee for referendums on assisted fertilization.

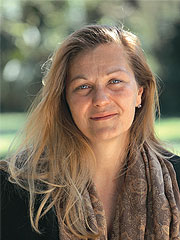
De Petris in 2006

She was re-confirmed senator at the political elections of 2006. In the early elections of 2008, she was candidate once again with The Left – The Rainbow, but this time she is not elected because the list does not exceed the threshold of the barrier provided by the 2005 electoral law.

=== From Left Ecology Freedom to Italian Left ===
In 2009 De Petris left the Greens and joined the Left Ecology Freedom party with her Ecologists Association. In the 2013 political elections she returned to the Senate and was elected president of the Mixed Group on 19 March 2013. After the dissolution of SEL she joined the Italian Left party.

In the political elections of 2018 she was re-elected senator with the left-wing coalition of Free and Equal and is confirmed president of the Mixed Group.
