= Freedom and Rights =

Freedom and Rights (Libertà e Diritti, LeD), whose complete name is Freedom and Rights – European Socialists (Libertà e Diritti – Socialisti Europei) as a reference to the Party of European Socialists (PES), is a democratic-socialist faction within the Democratic Party (PD), a political party in Italy. Before joining the PD in October 2014, LeD was active mainly as a sub-group within the Mixed Group in the Chamber of Deputies. LeD's leader is Gennaro Migliore.

LeD, described by its members as a "movement" or "association", was launched in July 2014 upon a split from Left Ecology Freedom (SEL), the then-largest party to the left of the PD. Right after the 2014 European Parliament election, fought by SEL within The Other Europe joint list, whose elects decided to sit in the European United Left–Nordic Green Left (GUE/NGL), twelve deputies left the party, citing disagreements with the party's line and being willing to support the Renzi Cabinet. The bulk of the splinters, nine out of twelve, joined forces in LeD (where they were joined by a M5S splinter), while the remaining three joined Renzi's PD.

In October Migliore announced that he and his followers were about to join the PD, thus transforming LeD into a faction of it.

In November eight deputies out of LeD's ten joined the PD's parliamentary group, while the remaining two stayed in the Mixed Group.

== Leadership ==
- President: Gennaro Migliore (2014–present)
- Spokesperson: Titti Di Salvo (2014–present)
