= Left Ecology Freedom =

Left Ecology Freedom Sinistra Ecologia Libertà
- President: Nichi Vendola
- Vice Presidents: Maria Luisa Boccia; Fabio Mussi
- Coordinator: Nicola Fratoianni
- Founded: 16 March 2009 (launched); 22 October 2010 (founded)
- Dissolved: 17 December 2016
- Merger of: Movement for the Left; Democratic Left; Unite the Left; Ecologists Association; Socialism and Left
- Merged into: Italian Left
- Membership (2013): 34,279
- Ideology: Democratic socialism Eco-socialism
- Political position: Left-wing
- National affiliation: IBC (2013 election); AET (2014 EP election); Italian Left (2015–2016)
- European Parliament group: European United Left–Nordic Green Left
- Colours: Red

Website
- www.sinistraecologialiberta.it

Left Ecology Freedom (Italian: Sinistra Ecologia Libertà, SEL) was a democratic socialist political party in Italy whose bulk was formed by former members of the Communist Refoundation Party.

The party's leader was Nichi Vendola, a former President of Apulia. On 17 December 2016, SEL dissolved into Italian Left, which was officially launched as a party in early 2017.

== History ==
=== Left and Freedom ===
SEL was formed as an alliance called Left and Freedom (Sinistra e Libertà, SL) in the run up to the 2009 European Parliament election in order to overcome the 4% threshold introduced by the new electoral law in February 2009.

At the time of formation, on 16 March 2009, SL included:

- Movement for the Left (MpS, socialist/communist, leader: Nichi Vendola, 2 MEPs)
- Socialist Party (PS, social-democratic, leader: Riccardo Nencini, 4 MEPs)
- Federation of the Greens (FdV, green, leader: Grazia Francescato, 2 MEPs)
- Democratic Left (SD, democratic socialist, leader: Claudio Fava)
- Unite the Left (UlS, socialist/communist, leaders: Umberto Guidoni, Katia Bellillo, 1 MEP)

The electoral symbol for the 2009 election included the logos of the Party of European Socialists (PES), the Federation of the Greens (a member of the European Greens), the European United Left–Nordic Green Left (GUE–NGL).

In the election, SL failed to pass the 4% threshold. Despite that, it was decided that SL would become a party.

=== Road to the new party ===
In October 2009, during a party congress, the Greens elected a new party leader, Angelo Bonelli, and voted to opt out from the process of the foundation of the new party. However, Francescato and her faction decided to keep supporting SL as Ecologists with Left Ecology Freedom and leave the Greens. SL was also weakened by the split occurred within PS, when the United Socialists, who were opposed to the integration of PS into SL, walked out. Finally in November SL was hit by the sudden opt-out of the whole PS. Since November 2009 SL was thus composed of MpS, SD, UlS, the Ecologists and Socialism and Left, a small minority of PS that wanted to continue the experience of SL.

In December SL was officially launched as a party, and Vendola was elected spokesperson.

After an important meeting in September in Naples, where it was decided to add "Ecology" to the party's name, in December 2009 Left Ecology and Freedom (SEL) held a constituent assembly in Rome. The new symbol was presented and Vendola was confirmed as spokesperson.

SEL, often in coalition with the PS, did well in the 2010 regional elections, especially in Central and Southern Italy. Overall, SEL won 3.0% of the vote, with the PS at 0.7% and the Greens at 0.2%. In the Apulian election Vendola was re-elected President of the Region and trailed SEL to 9.7%, its best regional result.

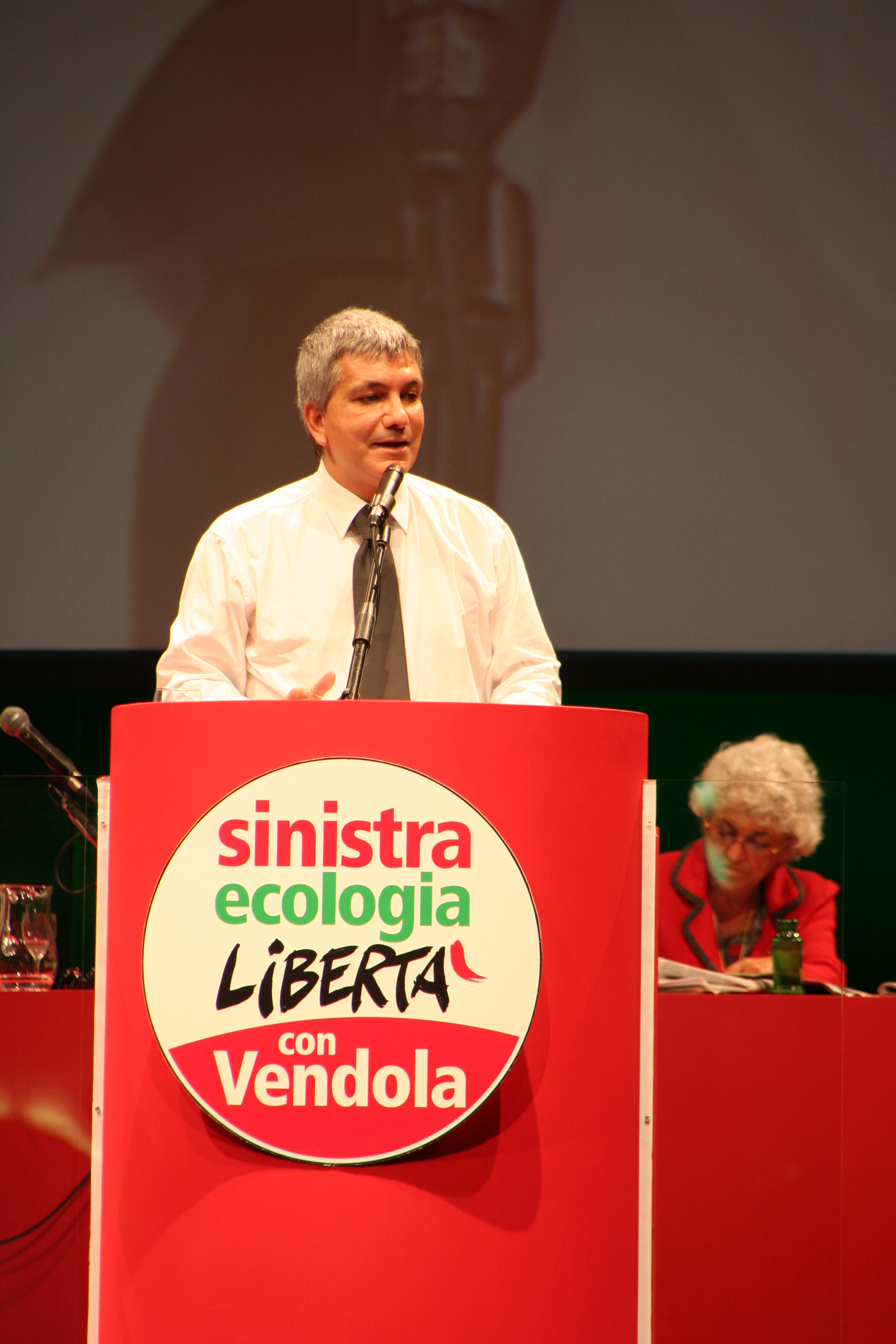
Nichi Vendola during the party's first congress in Florence.

The party was officially founded in a congress in Florence on 22–24 October 2010. Vendola was elected president.

=== Road to the 2013 general election ===
In 2011 and 2012, the party offered a strong competition to the Democratic Party (PD) in coalition primaries in many cities. In May 2011 Giuliano Pisapia and Massimo Zedda, who had been supported by SEL in primaries, were elected mayors of Milan and Cagliari, respectively. The party gained 5% in Milan, 6% in Turin, 10% in Bologna, 6% in Trieste, 4% in Naples and 7% in Cagliari.

In occasion of the 2011 referendums of June 2011 (on the abrogation of a law allowing the construction of nuclear power plants in Italy, the abrogation of a law allowing the privatisation of water management and the abrogation of so-called "legitimate impediment"), SEL gave full support to the "yes" committees. In May 2012, Marco Doria, another independent close to SEL, was elected Mayor of Genoa.

In August 2012, Vendola announced his bid for the primary election in order to select the candidate for Prime Minister of the PD-led centre-left coalition in the 2013 general election. On 25 November of the same year, Vendola won 15.6% of the vote and came third behind Democrats Pier Luigi Bersani (44.9%) and Matteo Renzi (35.5%). In the run-off Vendola supported Bersani, who defeated Renzi 60.9% to 39.1%. SEL selected its candidates for the election through a closed primary in December 2012.

=== 2013 general election ===
In the 2013 general election, which took place in February 2013, the party was part of the centre-left Italy. Common Good coalition, which supported PD leader Pier Luigi Bersani as candidate for Prime Minister. In the election SEL won 3.2% of the vote, returning 37 deputies and 7 senators. In its Trentino-Alto Adige/Südtirol's list SEL included some representatives of the Greens of South Tyrol: one of them, Florian Kronbichler, was elected to the Chamber.

On 16 March 2013, Laura Boldrini, an independent member of SEL, was elected President of the Chamber of Deputies.

In September 2013, SEL expressed its intention to join the Party of European Socialists (PES), however in January 2014, the party finally endorsed Alexis Tsipras, leader of the Greek Coalition of the Radical Left (Syriza) and standard-bearer of the Party of European Left in the 2014 European Parliament election, as their chosen candidate for President of the European Commission, and contested the election within The Other Europe electoral list.

=== 2014 European Parliament election ===
Ahead of the 2014 European Parliament election the party participated in the formation of a left-wing joint list, The Other Europe, which was endorsed by Alexis Tsipras and included several intellectuals and the Communist Refoundation Party. In the election the list obtained 4.0% of the vote and 3 MEPs.

Right after the election, the party suffered a severe split in its parliamentary ranks as 12 deputies out of 37, including the floor leader Gennaro Migliore (who was replaced by Nicola Fratoianni and, soon after, Arturo Scotto), left the party over disagreements with the party's line and started to support the Renzi Cabinet. The bulk of the splinters joined forces in Freedom and Rights – European Socialists, while some others directly joined Renzi's Democratic Party.

=== Dissolution into Italian Left ===
In November 2015, SEL formed a joint parliamentary group in the Chamber, named Italian Left (SI), with splinters from the PD (see Future to the Left) and other parties. In February 2016, SI held its constituent assembly in Rome, where it was announced that SI will be founded as a full-fledged party in December. In March 2016, SI was established as a sub-group within the Mixed Group in the Senate: five SEL senators joined, while other two (including Sardist Luciano Uras) refused to do so.

On 17 December 2016, SEL was merged into SI, which would be officially launched as a party in early 2017.

== Electoral results ==
=== Italian Parliament ===
Election	Leader	Chamber of Deputies					Senate of the Republic					Government
Election	Leader	Votes	%	Seats	+/–	Position	Votes	%	Seats	+/–	Position	Government
2013	Nichi Vendola	1,089,442	3.2	37 / 630	–	6th	912,347	3.0	7 / 315	–	6th	Opposition (2013–2014)
2013	Nichi Vendola	1,089,442	3.2	37 / 630	–	6th	912,347	3.0	7 / 315	–	6th	Opposition (2014–2016)

=== European Parliament ===
European Parliament
Election year	Votes	%	Seats	+/–	Leader
2009	958,458 (7th)	3.1	0 / 72	–	Nichi Vendola
2014	into Other Europe	4.0	3 / 73	–	Nichi Vendola

== Leadership ==
- Spokesperson/President: Nichi Vendola (2009–2016)
  - Vice President: Maria Luisa Boccia (2014–2016), Fabio Mussi (2014–2016)
  - Coordinator: Claudio Fava (2009–2013), Francesco Ferrara (2013–2014), Nicola Fratoianni (2014–2016)
- President of the National Bureau: Fabio Mussi (2010–2014)
- President of the National Assembly: Maria Luisa Boccia (2010–2014), Paolo Cento (2014–2016)
- Party Leader in the Chamber of Deputies: Gennaro Migliore (2013–2014), Nicola Fratoianni (2014), Arturo Scotto (2014–2016)
- Party Leader in the Senate: Loredana De Petris (2013–2016)

== Symbols ==
2009

2009

2010–2016
