= 2017 Italian local elections =

The 2017 Italian local elections were held on Sunday 11 June. If necessary, a run-off vote was held on Sunday 25 June. The term of mayors and councils will last five years, unless an early election is triggered.

In the autonomous regions of Trentino-Alto Adige/Südtirol and Aosta Valley the elections will be held on 7 May.

The elections were characterized by a good performance of the centre-right coalition and many losses for the centre-left coalition, which however won in the majority of municipalities with more than 15,000 inhabitants, but lost in the most important cities like Genoa, L'Aquila and Parma; while the Five Star Movement was excluded from the runoffs in all the most important cities. In Lecce, the result was an anatra zoppa situation, as the centre-left candidate was elected mayor, but the centre-right coalition won a majority of seats on the city council.

== Voting system ==
Every municipality with more than 15,000 inhabitants elects its mayor and city council with the same system.

Voters express a direct choice for the mayor or an indirect choice voting for one of the parties of the candidate's coalition. If no candidate receives a majority of votes, the top two candidates go to a second round two weeks later. The coalition of the elected mayor is guaranteed a majority of seats in the council with the attribution of extra seats, unless an anatra zoppa situation occurs. If the Mayor resigns, dies, lose a motion of confidence, or a majority of the municipal councillors step down at the same time, an early election (for the Mayor and for all municipal councillors) is called.

The City Council is elected at the same time as the mayor. Voters can vote for a list of candidates and can express up to two preferences for candidates of said list, provided they are selecting candidates of both genders. Seats are then attributed to parties proportionally, and for each party the candidates with the highest number of preferences are elected. However, if in a first round, no candidate received a majority of the votes, but the lists supporting a candidate different than the runoff winner won a majority of votes; or if a mayor was elected in first round, but the lists supporting them did not receive 40% of the votes, the coalition supporting the mayor will not receive a majority of seats in the council. That is called an anatra zoppa situation.

The municipalities with a population of less than 15,000 elect their mayors with a plurality system. A mayoral candidate can be supported by only one list, and the list of the elected mayor gets a two-thirds majority of seats. Voters can express up to two preferences for candidates of the chosen list, provided they are selecting candidates of both genders. Seats are then attributed to the candidates with the highest number of preferences.

== Results ==
=== Overall results ===
Majority of each coalition in 161 municipalities (comuni) with a population higher than 15,000:

Coalition	Comuni
Centre-left coalition	67
Centre-right coalition	59
Civic lists	20
Five Star Movement	8
Left-wing coalition	2

Notes: almost all political parties and coalitions in local (municipal and regional) elections usually run with the support of some minor allied list active in local politics forming coalitions under the same nominee as the mayoral candidate, only M5S ran in all elections with a single list (that is the list of M5S under the M5S nominee as the mayoral candidate without forming coalitions with minor local lists or other national parties).

By party

Party votes in the main municipalities:

Party	%
Democratic Party	15.6%
Five Star Movement	8.7%
Forza Italia	6.8%
Northern League	6.7%
Italian Left	6.5%
Brothers of Italy	2.5%

By coalition

Coalition votes in the main municipalities:

Coalition	%
Centre-left coalition	37.2%
Centre-right coalition	34.4%
Five Star Movement	9.4%
Left-wing coalition	7.0%

=== Mayoral election results ===
Centre-left coalition
Centre-right coalition
Five Star Movement
Civic lists
Centrist coalition
Left-wing coalition
Prefectural commissioner

Region	City	Population	Incumbent mayor	Elected mayor	1st round		2nd round		Seats	Source
Region	City	Population	Incumbent mayor	Elected mayor	Votes	%	Votes	%	Seats	Source
Piedmont	Alessandria	93,894	Maria Rita Rossa (PD)	Gianfranco Cuttica di Revigliasco (LN)	12,144	30.25%	18,762	55.68%	20 / 32	
Piedmont	Asti	76,048	Fabrizio Brignolo (PD)	Maurizio Rasero (FI)	15,868	47.62%	13,218	54.90%	20 / 32	
Piedmont	Cuneo	56,051	Federico Borgna (Ind.)	Federico Borgna (Ind.)	15,400	59.65%	—	—	21 / 32	
Lombardy	Como	84,495	Mario Lucini (PD)	Mario Landriscina (Ind.)	11,826	34.77%	13,045	52.68%	20 / 32	
Lombardy	Lodi	44,945	Mariano Savastano	Sara Casanova (LN)	5,523	27.32%	9,859	56.90%	19 / 32	
Lombardy	Monza	122,849	Roberto Scanagatti (PD)	Dario Allevi (FI)	19,344	39.84%	21,869	51.33%	20 / 32	
Veneto	Belluno	35,870	Jacopo Massaro (Ind.)	Jacopo Massaro (Ind.)	7,555	46.19%	8,511	63.15%	20 / 32	
Veneto	Padua	211,215	Paolo De Biagi	Sergio Giordani (PD)	28,593	29.20%	47,888	51.84%	19 / 32	
Veneto	Verona	258,274	Flavio Tosi (F!)	Federico Sboarina (Ind.)	33,440	29.13%	46,962	58.11%	22 / 36	
Friuli-Venezia Giulia	Gorizia	34,844	Ettore Romoli (FI)	Rodolfo Ziberna (FI)	8,543	49.88%	7,774	59.79%	24 / 40	
Liguria	Genoa	585,407	Marco Doria (Ind.)	Marco Bucci (Ind.)	88,781	38.80%	112,398	55.24%	24 / 40	
Liguria	La Spezia	116,456	Massimo Federici (PD)	Pierluigi Peracchini (Ind.)	13,187	32.61%	20,636	59.98%	19 / 32	
Emilia-Romagna	Parma	194,001	Federico Pizzarotti (M5S)	Federico Pizzarotti (Ind.)	26,496	34.78%	37,157	57.87%	20 / 32	
Emilia-Romagna	Piacenza	102,191	Paolo Dosi (PD)	Patrizia Barbieri (Ind.)	14,625	34.78%	20,500	58.54%	20 / 32	
Tuscany	Lucca	89,781	Alessandro Tambellini (PD)	Alessandro Tambellini (PD)	13,922	37.48%	17,453	50.52%	20 / 32	
Tuscany	Pistoia	90,315	Samuele Bertinelli (PD)	Alessandro Tomasi (FdI)	10,435	26.68%	19,049	54.28%	20 / 32	
Lazio	Frosinone	46,323	Nicola Ottaviani (FI)	Nicola Ottaviani (FI)	15,038	56.38%	—	—	20 / 32	
Lazio	Rieti	47,698	Simone Petrangeli (SEL)	Antonio Cicchetti (FI)	13,138	47.29%	12,660	50.20%	20 / 32	
Abruzzo	L'Aquila	69,627	Massimo Cialente (PD)	Pierluigi Biondi (FdI)	14,142	35.84%	16,410	53.52%	20 / 32	
Apulia	Lecce	94,916	Paolo Perrone (CoR)	Carlo Salvemini (Ind.)	15,243	28.90%	22,050	54.76%	14 / 32	
Apulia	Taranto	200,461	Ippazio Stefano (SEL)	Rinaldo Melucci (PD)	16,799	17.92%	26,913	50.91%	20 / 32	
Calabria	Catanzaro	90,612	Sergio Abramo (FI)	Sergio Abramo (FI)	21,055	39.72%	21,963	64.39%	20 / 32	
Sicily	Palermo	671,696	Leoluca Orlando (Ind.)	Leoluca Orlando (Ind.)	125,913	46.28%	—	—	24 / 40	
Sicily	Trapani	68,759	Vito Damiano (Ind.)	Francesco Messineo	—	—	—	—	—	
Sardinia	Oristano	31,630	Guido Tendas (PD)	Andrea Lutzu (FI)	4,955	29.60%	7,822	65.29%	15 / 24	
