= 2012 Italian local elections =

The 2012 Italian local elections were held on 6–7 May, with a second round on 20–21 May. In Italy, direct elections were held in 948 municipalities: in each municipality (comune) were chosen mayor and members of the City Council. Of the 948 municipalities, 28 were provincial capitals and only 176 had a population higher than 15,000 inhabitants (10,000 for Sicily).

Citizens living in Italy who were 18 or over on election day were entitled to vote in the local council elections. The deadline for voters to register to vote in the 6–7 May elections was midday on Tuesday 3 April 2012.

For the first time there weren't provincial elections around Italy because they were abolished by the Law n.3660 of 4 December 2011. Instead of a president, the provincial government would be entrusted to a Special Commissioner.

Other elections were taken on 10–11 June with a second round on 24–25 June in 65 municipalities of Sardinia: important cities like Alghero and Oristano chose their mayors and councils.

Total voter turnout on the first round was of 66.9%, lower than that of 2007; 667 municipalities in the first round had a mayor elected (except Sicily).

In Isernia, the result was an anatra zoppa case: Ugo De Vivo of centre-left coalition won the runoff, but the lists supporting him did not get a majority of votes, thus leaving him without a council majority.

== Voting System ==
All mayoral elections in Italy in cities with a population higher than 15,000 use the same voting system. Under this system voters express a direct choice for the mayor or an indirect choice voting for the party of the candidate's coalition. If no candidate receives at least 50% of votes, the top two candidates go to a second round after two weeks. This gives a result whereby the winning candidate may be able to claim majority support, although it is not guaranteed. If the lists supporting a different candidate than the elected mayor receive a majority of votes, the outcome will be anatra zoppa: with the mayor and the majority of council being from different camps.

The election of the City Council is based on a direct choice for the candidate with a preference vote: the candidate with the majority of the preferences is elected. The number of the seats for each party is determined proportionally.

== Results ==
Majority of each coalition in 142 municipalities (comuni) with a population higher than 15,000:

Coalition	Comuni
Centre-left coalition	82
Centre-right coalition	29
Five Star Movement	2
Independents and others	29

=== Party results ===
Party votes in 26 provincial capital municipalities:

Party	Votes	%
Democratic Party	248,909	16.29
The People of Freedom	176,983	11.58
Five Star Movement	105,488	6.90
Union of the Centre	75,782	4.96
Italy of Values	68,290	4.47
Left Ecology Freedom	46,943	3.07
Northern League	41,388	2.71
Totals with others	1,528,047	100

=== Mayoral election results ===
Cities	Population	Incumbent mayor	Party	Elected mayor	Party
L'Aquila	72,511	Massimo Cialente	Centre-left	Massimo Cialente	Centre-left
Catanzaro	93,124	Michele Traversa	Centre-right	Sergio Abramo	Centre-right
Parma	186,690	Pietro Vignali	Centre-right	Federico Pizzarotti	Five Star
Piacenza	103,206	Roberto Reggi	Centre-left	Paolo Dosi	Centre-left
Gorizia	35,798	Ettore Romoli	Centre-right	Ettore Romoli	Centre-right
Frosinone	48,122	Michele Marini	Centre-left	Nicola Ottaviani	Centre-right
Rieti	47,774	Giuseppe Emili	Centre-right	Simone Petrangeli	Centre-left
Genoa	607,906	Marta Vincenzi	Centre-left	Marco Doria	Centre-left
La Spezia	95,378	Massimo Federici	Centre-left	Massimo Federici	Centre-left
Como	85,263	Stefano Bruni	Centre-right	Mario Lucini	Centre-left
Monza	122,712	Marco Mariani	Centre-right	Roberto Scanagatti	Centre-left
Isernia	22,150	Gabriele Melogli	Centre-right	Ugo De Vivo	Centre-left
Alessandria	94,974	Piercarlo Fabbio	Centre-right	Maria Rita Rossa	Centre-left
Asti	76,534	Giorgio Galvagno	Centre-right	Fabrizio Brignolo	Centre-left
Cuneo	55,714	Alberto Valmaggia	Centre-left	Federico Borgna	Centre
Brindisi	89,780	Domenico Mennitti	Centre-right	Cosimo Consales	Centre-left
Lecce	95,520	Paolo Perrone	Centre-right	Paolo Perrone	Centre-right
Taranto	203,257	Ippazio Stefano	Centre-left	Ippazio Stefano	Centre-left
Trani	53,940	Giuseppe Tarantini	Centre-right	Luigi Nicola Riserbato	Centre-right
Oristano	31,630	Angela Eugenia Nonnis	Centre-right	Guido Tendas	Centre-left
Agrigento	54,619	Marco Zambuto	Centre	Marco Zambuto	Centre
Palermo	686,722	Diego Cammarata	Centre-right	Leoluca Orlando	Left-wing
Trapani	68,346	Girolamo Fazio	Centre-right	Vito Damiano	Centre-right
Lucca	84,939	Mauro Favilla	Centre-right	Alessandro Tambellini	Centre-left
Pistoia	90,288	Roberto Berti	Centre-left	Samuele Bertinelli	Centre-left
Belluno	36,599	Antonio Prade	Centre-right	Jacopo Massaro	Civic
Verona	263,964	Flavio Tosi	Centre-right	Flavio Tosi	Centre-right

=== City councils ===
City	PD	PdL	M5S	LN	SEL	IdV	UDC	Others
Alessandria	10	5	2	0	1	1	1	8
Asti	10	4	1	0	0	2	1	8
Cuneo	2	0	0	1	0	1	5	18
La Spezia	12	4	3	0	2	1	0	6
Genova	12	4	4	0	2	3	4	7
Monza	15	4	1	1	1	2	0	2
Como	10	3	0	1	2	0	0	10
Verona	6	1	2	5	1	0	1	17
Belluno	3	1	1	0	0	0	0	23
Gorizia	6	14	2	2	1	1	3	9
Parma	5	0	20	0	0	0	1	2
Piacenza	12	6	2	0	1	1	0	7
Lucca	10	2	1	0	1	1	1	11
Pistoia	14	5	2	0	1	1	0	6
Carrara	8	1	2	0	1	0	0	9
Frosinone	3	10	0	0	0	0	1	16
Rieti	7	3	0	0	2	1	4	14
L'Aquila	9	1	0	0	1	1	2	13
Isernia	3	6	0	0	1	3	3	14
Brindisi	6	3	0	0	2	0	3	14
Lecce	4	10	0	0	0	0	0	16
Trani	2	12	0	0	1	0	3	12
Taranto	7	1	0	0	2	1	2	15
Oristano	6	1	0	0	1	0	3	13
Palermo	3	3	0	0	0	30	3	11
Agrigento	2	5	0	0	0	0	4	19
Trapani	3	5	0	0	0	0	0	22
