= Timeline of Parma =

The following is a timeline of the history of the city of Parma in the Emilia-Romagna region of Italy.

== Prior to 18th century ==
- 187 BCE – Via Aemilia (road) built through Parma.
- 183 BCE – Parma becomes a Roman colony.
- 4th century CE – Roman Catholic Diocese of Parma established (approximate date).
- 452 CE – Parma burned by forces of Attila.
- 569 CE – Alboin in power.
- 1046 – Cadalus becomes bishop.
- 1106 – Parma Cathedral consecrated.
- 1117 – Earthquake.
- 1248 – Battle of Parma.
- 1281 – Parma Baptistery built.
- 1307 – Giberto III da Correggio in power.
- 1346 – Visconti in power.
- 1356 – La Rocchetta citadel built.
- 1472 – Printing press in operation.
- 1488 – Banca Monte Parma (bank) established.
- 1510 – San Giovanni Evangelista church built (approximate date).
- 1512 – Parma becomes a papal possession.
- 1521 – Siege of Parma (1521) by French forces.
- 1539 – Sanctuary of Santa Maria della Steccata built.
- 1545 – Duchy of Parma established.
- 1574 – Accademia degli Innominati founded.
- 1580 – Palazzo della Pilotta construction begins.
- 1591 – Parma Citadel built.
- 1627 – Palazzo del Comune (Parma) and Palazzo del Governatore (Parma) rebuilt (approximate date).
- 1628 – Teatro Farnese (theatre) opens.

== 18th–19th centuries ==
- 1734 – Austrians in power.
- 1735 – Gazzetta di Parma newspaper begins publication.
- 1757 – Academy of Fine Arts of Parma founded.
- 1769 – Royal Library of Parma inaugurated.
- 1808 – Parma becomes part of the French Taro (department).
- 1817 – Cimitero della Villetta (cemetery) established.
- 1825 - Parma Conservatory established from the previously existing Regia Scuola di Canto
- 1829 – Nuovo Teatro Ducale (theatre) built.
- 1833 – Population: 48,523.
- 1849 – Baron d'Aspre with 15,000 Austrians took possession of Parma.
- 1855 – 26 December: Premiere of Verdi's opera I vespri siciliani.
- 1859
  - June: Political unrest.
  - Parma railway station opens.
- 1860 – Deputazione di Storia Patria per le Province Parmensi (history society) founded.
- 1861
  - Parma becomes part of the Kingdom of Italy.
  - Corpo bandistico municipale Giuseppe Verdi di Parma (concert band) active.
- 1865 – Biblioteca Popolare Circolante (library) organized.
- 1866 – Parma Synagogue built.
- 1867 – Future orchestra conductor Arturo Toscanini born in Parma.
- 1884 – Parma-Colorno railway begins operating.
- 1885 – Brescia–Parma railway begins operating.
- 1893 – National Camera del Lavoro congress held in Parma.
- 1899 – Parma tram begins operating.

== 20th century ==
- 1906 – Population: 48,523.
- 1908 – Labor strike.
- 1910 – Parma-Fornovo Tram and Parma-Marzolara Tram begin operating.
- 1911 – Population: 51,910.
- 1913 – Parma Foot Ball Club formed.
- 1920 – Monument to Giuseppe Verdi (Parma) erected.
- 1922 – August: Fatti di Parma (political unrest).
- 1923
  - Parma Airport built.
  - Stadio Ennio Tardini (stadium) opens.
- 1925 – Parma Chamber of Commerce building constructed.
- 1930 – Biblioteca civica di Parma (library) established.
- 1931 – Population: 71,282.
- 1941 – Teatro al Parco (theatre) built in the Parco Ducale (Parma).
- 1943 – Parma occupied by German forces.
- 1944 – Bombing of Parma in World War II.
- 1945 – German forces ousted.
- 1951 – Population: 122,978.
- 1953 – Trolleybus system begins operating.
- 1961 – Population: 147,368.
- 1971 – Population: 175,228.
- 1978 – Tv Parma begins broadcasting.

== 21st century ==
- 2001 – Auditorium Niccolò Paganini built.
- 2002 – Casa della Musica established.
- 2012 – May: Parma municipal election held; Federico Pizzarotti becomes mayor.
- 2013 – Population: 177,714.

== See also ==
- Parma history
- History of Parma
- Urban development of Parma
- List of mayors of Parma
- List of bishops of Parma
- List of dukes of Parma, 1545–1859
- State Archives of Parma (state archives)
- History of Emilia (region of Italy)

Timelines of other cities in the macroregion of Northeast Italy:^{(it)}

- Emilia-Romagna region: Timeline of Bologna; Ferrara; Forlì; Modena; Piacenza; Ravenna; Reggio Emilia; Rimini
- Friuli-Venezia Giulia region: Timeline of Trieste
- Trentino-South Tyrol region: Timeline of Trento
- Veneto region: Timeline of Padua; Treviso; Venice; Verona; Vicenza

== Bibliography ==
=== in English ===
- William Smith, ed. (1872) [1854]. "Parma". Dictionary of Greek and Roman Geography. London: John Murray. hdl:2027/hvd.ah5cur.
- "Parma", Hand-book for Travellers in Northern Italy (16th ed.), London: John Murray, 1897, OCLC 2231483
- Umberto Cassuto (1905), "Parma", Jewish Encyclopedia, vol. 9, New York, hdl:2027/mdp.49015002282474
- "Parma" . Encyclopædia Britannica. Vol. 20 (11th ed.). 1910. pp. 850–851.
- Benjamin Vincent (1910), "Parma", Haydn's Dictionary of Dates (25th ed.), London: Ward, Lock & Co., hdl:2027/uc2.ark:/13960/t41r6xh8t
- Edward Hutton (1912), "Parma", The Cities of Lombardy, New York: Macmillan Co.
- "Parma", Northern Italy (14th ed.), Leipzig: Karl Baedeker, 1913 + (1870 ed.)
- Roy Domenico (2002). "Emilia Romagna: Parma". Regions of Italy: a Reference Guide to History and Culture. Greenwood. pp. 92+. ISBN 0313307334.
- Christopher Kleinhenz, ed. (2004). "Parma". Medieval Italy: an Encyclopedia. Routledge. p. 855+. ISBN 0415939291.
- Charles M. Rosenberg, ed. (2010). Court Cities of Northern Italy: Milan, Parma, Piacenza, Mantua, Ferrara, Bologna, Urbino, Pesaro, and Rimini. Cambridge University Press. ISBN 978-0-521-79248-6.
- Lisa Sampson (2016). "Reforming Theatre in Farnese Parma: The Case of the Accademia degli Innominati (1574–1608)". In Jane E. Everson; et al. (eds.). Italian Academies 1525–1700: Networks of Culture, Innovation and Dissent. Routledge. pp. 62–76. ISBN 978-1-317-19630-3.

=== in Italian ===
- Italien (1865). "Elenco delle biblioteche del regno: Parma". Statistica del Regno d'Italia: biblioteche (in Italian). Florence. (List of libraries)
- Nicola Bernardini, ed. (1890). "Provincia di Parma". Guida della stampa periodica italiana [Guide to Italian Periodicals] (in Italian). Lecce: R. Tipografia editrice salentina dei fratelli Spacciante. p. 591+.
- Ministero dell'agricoltura, dell'industria e del commercio [in Italian] (1893). "Parma". Statistica delle biblioteche (in Italian). Rome. (List of libraries)
- Stefano Lottici; Giuseppe Sitti (1904). Bibliografia generale per la storia parmense [Bibliography of the history of Parma] (in Italian). Alfonso Zerbini.
- "Parma", Enciclopedia Italiana (in Italian), 1935
