= Pigni =

Pigni is a surname. Notable people with this surname include:

- Paola Pigni (1945–2021), Italian runner
- Renzo Pigni (1925–2019), Italian politician
