= List of mayors of Agrigento =

Mayor of Agrigento
- Sindaco di Agrigento

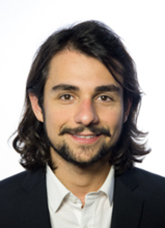
- Incumbent; Michele Sodano since 11 June 2026
- Appointer: Popular election
- Term length: 5 years, renewable once
- Formation: 1860
- Website: Official website

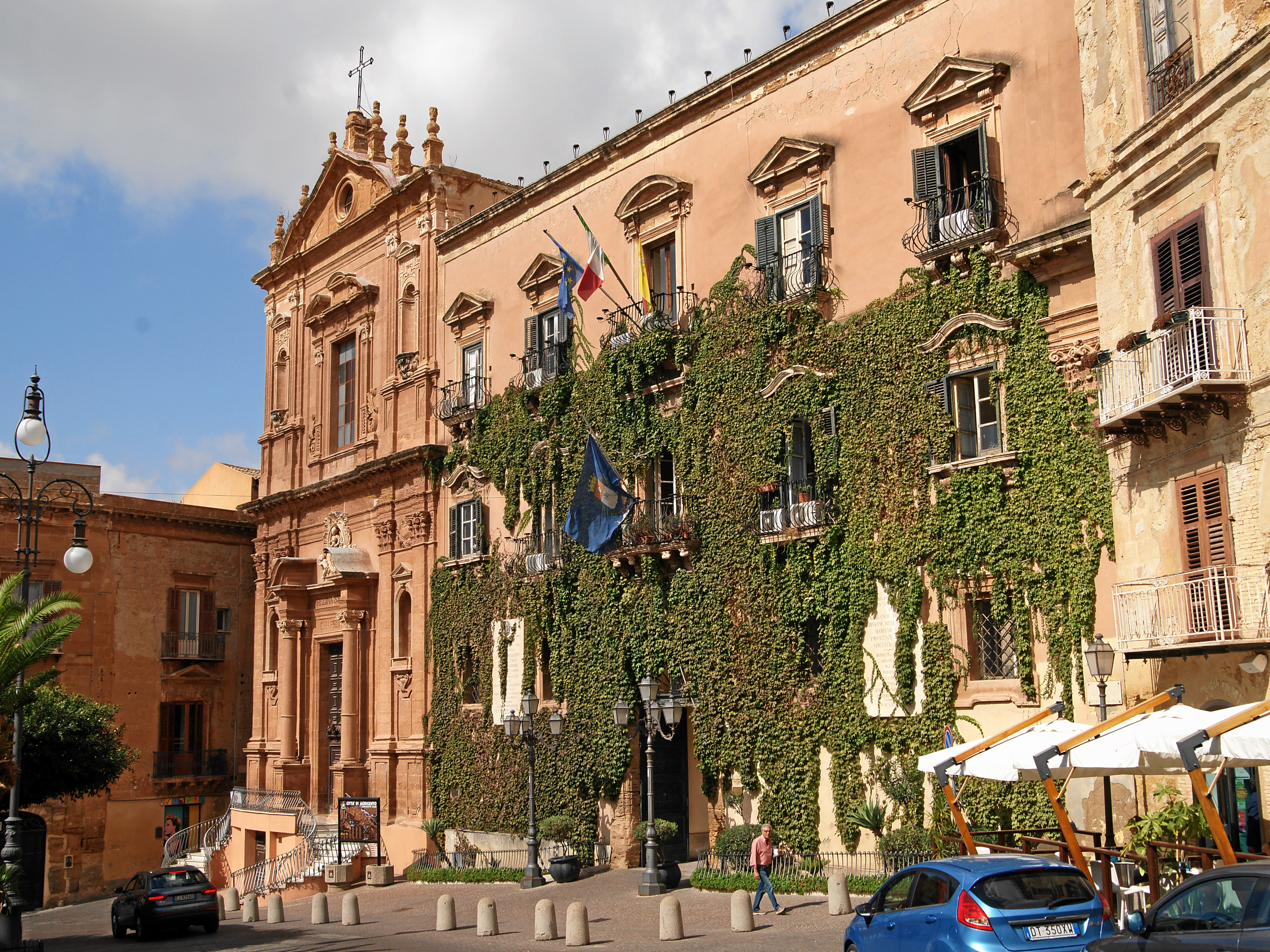
Palace of the Giants is the seat of the Mayor of Agrigento.

The mayor of Agrigento is an elected politician who, along with the Agrigento's city council, is accountable for the strategic government of Agrigento in Sicily, Italy.

The current mayor is Michele Sodano, who took office on 11 June 2026.

== Overview ==
According to the Italian Constitution, the mayor of Agrigento is member of the city council.

The mayor is elected by the population of Agrigento, who also elects the members of the city council, controlling the mayor's policy guidelines and is able to enforce his resignation by a motion of no confidence. The mayor is entitled to appoint and release the members of his government.

Since 1993 the mayor is elected directly by Agrigento's electorate: in all mayoral elections in Italy in cities with a population higher than 15,000 the voters express a direct choice for the mayor or an indirect choice voting for the party of the candidate's coalition. If no candidate receives at least 40% of votes, the top two candidates go to a second round after two weeks. The election of the City Council is based on a direct choice for the candidate with a preference vote: the candidate with the majority of the preferences is elected. The number of the seats for each party is determined proportionally.

== Republic of Italy (since 1946) ==
=== City council election (1946–1993) ===
From 1946 to 1993, the Mayor of Agrigento was elected by the City Council.

	Mayor	Term start	Term end	Party
1	Giovanni Lauricella	1946	1948	DC
2	Giovanni Finazzi Agrò	1948	1952	DC
3	Ignazio Altieri	1952	1955	DC
4	Stefano D'Alessandro	1955	1956	DC
4	Antonino Di Giovanna	1956	1956	DC
6	Enzo Lauretta	1956	1960	DC
7	Vincenzo Foti	1960	1964	DC
8	Antonino Ginex	1964	1966	DC
9	Antonino Marsala	1966	1967	DC
Special Prefectural Commissioner's tenure (1967–1970)
10	Francesco Alaimo	1970	1976	DC
11	Angelo Errore	1976	1980	DC
12	Calogero Zambuto	1980	1983	DC
13	Giuseppe Barba	1983	1985	DC
14	Calogero Sodano	1985	1986	DC
Special Prefectural Commissioner's tenure (1986–1987)
15	Emanuele Mattiolo	1987	1988	DC
16	Angelo Scifo	1988	1990	DC
17	Giovanni Di Mauro	1990	1992	DC
18	Leonardo Bonaccolta	1992	1993	DC

=== Direct election (since 1993) ===
Since 1993, under provisions of new local administration law, the Mayor of Agrigento is chosen by direct election, originally every four, then every five years.

	Mayor	Term start	Term end	Party	Coalition	Election
(14)	Calogero Sodano	20 June 1993	30 November 1997	DC; CCD	DC • PRI	1993
(14)	Calogero Sodano	30 November 1997	26 November 2001	DC; CCD	FI • AN • CCD • CDU	1997
19	Aldo Piazza	26 November 2001	28 May 2007	CCD; UDC	FI • AN • CCD • CDU	2001
20	Marco Zambuto	28 May 2007 (Note: Election originally scheduled for November 2006 then postponed to May 2007 to avoid an autumn electoral campaign.)	22 May 2012	UDEUR	UDEUR • DS	2007
20	Marco Zambuto	22 May 2012	13 June 2014 (Note: Resigned.)	UDEUR	UDC • UDEUR	2012
Luciana Giammarco, Special Prefectural Commissioner (13 June 2014 – 3 June 2015)
21	Calogero Firetto	3 June 2015	21 October 2020	UDC	UDC • PD • NCD	2015
22	Francesco Miccichè	21 October 2020 (Note: Election originally scheduled for June 2020 then postponed due to the COVID-19 pandemic.)	11 June 2026	Ind	Ind	2020
23	Michele Sodano	11 June 2026 (Note: Election originally scheduled for October 2025 then postponed to May 2026. According to the Italian law, since 2011 local elections can take place each year only between 15 April and 15 June.)	Incumbent	CC	CC • M5S • PD	2026
