= Michele Guerra =

Italian academic and politician (born 1982)

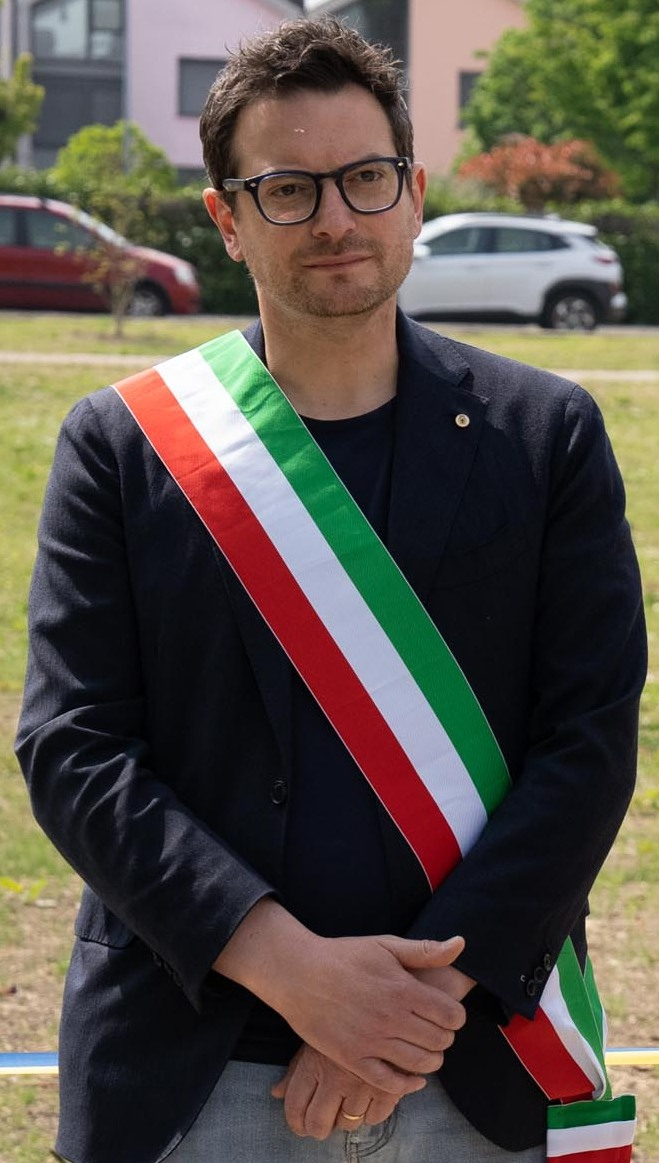

Mayor of Parma
- Incumbent
- Assumed office 1 July 2022
- Preceded by: Federico Pizzarotti

Personal details
- Born: 19 January 1982 (age 44) Parma, Italy
- Party: Italy in Common
- Education: University of Parma
- Occupation: University professor

Michele Guerra (born 19 January 1982) is an Italian academic and politician, Mayor of Parma since 2022.

== Biography ==
Guerra graduated cum laude in modern literature at the University of Parma in 2004, where he then obtained a PhD in history of art and entertainment by discussing a thesis on the representation of rural classes in Italian cinema from fascism to the 1970s.

From 2009 to 2011 he was adjunct professor of history and criticism of cinema in the course of written and hypertext communication sciences at the University of Parma, while from 2011 to 2015 he was a researcher of cinema, photography and television at the same university. After being associate professor from 2015 to 2018, he has held the role of full professor since 2018.

From 2017 to 2022 he held the position of councilor for culture in the municipality of Parma in the second council of the mayor Federico Pizzarotti.

=== Mayor of Parma ===
In view of the local elections of 2022, following an agreement between the Effetto Parma movement and the centre-left coalition led by the Democratic Party, Guerra is indicated as the official candidate of the coalition for the office of Mayor of Parma. After obtaining 44.18% of the votes in the first round, he defeats the former mayor Pietro Vignali supported by the center-right with 66% of the votes in the ballot, being elected mayor.

Political offices
Preceded by Federico Pizzarotti	Mayor of Parma since 2022	Incumbent
