= Mario Landriscina =

Italian politician

Mayor of Como
- In office 27 June 2017 – 29 June 2022
- Preceded by: Mario Lucini
- Succeeded by: Alessandro Rapinese

Personal details
- Born: 10 April 1954 (age 72) Como, Lombardy, Italy
- Party: Centre-right independent
- Education: University of Milan
- Profession: physician

Mario Landriscina (born 10 April 1954) is an Italian politician.

Landriscina ran as an independent for the office of Mayor of Como at the 2017 Italian local elections, supported by a centre-right coalition. He won and took office on 27 June 2017.

== See also ==
- 2017 Italian local elections
- List of mayors of Como

Political offices
Preceded by Mario Lucini	Mayor of Como; 2017 - 2022	Succeeded by Alessandro Rapinese
