= List of Italian convicted MPs =

This is an alphabetical list of the present MPs, senators and European MPs from Italy that have received final conviction, not obstructed by statutory terms.

Politicians who have been found guilty, but were amnestied or acquitted on grounds of statutory terms (such as Giulio Andreotti, Silvio Berlusconi and Massimo D'Alema) are not supposed to be in this list.

Politicians found guilty, but no longer present in either parliament (as Bettino Craxi), are neither supposed to be included.

These MPs were elected in the National elections of 2001 and in the European election of 2004.

Massimo Maria Berruti (MP for Forza Italia)

- 8 months for aiding and abetting in a trial for bribes to Guardia di Finanza.

Alfredo Biondi (MP for Forza Italia)

- 2 months (negotiated) tax fraud in Genoa.

Vito Bonsignore (European MP for UDC)

- 2 years for attempted corruption in the construction of a hospital in Asti.

Mario Borghezio (European MP for Northern League)

- Fined 750,000 lire for beating a Moroccan child in 1991.
- Fined €3,040 in 2005 for arson of the belongings of some immigrants sleeping under a bridge.

Umberto Bossi (European MP, secretary of Northern League, Minister of Federal Reforms)

- 8 months for the Enimont bribe.

Giampiero Cantoni (senator for Forza Italia)

- As former president of Banca Nazionale del Lavoro, associated to the Italian Socialist Party, he was investigated and arrested for corruption, bankruptcy fraud and other crimes. He negotiated sentences for about two years, and refounded 800 million lire.

Enzo Carra (MP for The Daisy)

- 1 year and 4 months for false statements to prosecutors about the Enimont bribe.

Paolo Cirino Pomicino (European MP for UDEUR)

- 1 year and 8 months for illegal financing, in the Enimont bribe.
- 2 months negotiated for corruption and Eni black funds.

Marcello Dell'Utri (senator for Forza Italia and member of the European Council)

- 2 years for tax fraud and false invoices in Turin, regarding his time in Publitalia.
- 6 months negotiated in Milan for other issues about false invoices accounting in Publitalia.

Antonio Del Pennino (senator for Forza Italia)

- 2 months and 20 days negotiated for illegal financing (Enimont bribe).
- 1 year, 8 months and 20 days negotiated for illegal financing in the Milan underground.

Gianni De Michelis (MP and secretary of the Socialist Party – New PSI)

- 1 year and 6 months negotiated in Milan for corruption and bribes for highways in Veneto.
- 6 months negotiated for illegal financing (Enimont bribe).

Walter De Rigo (senator for Forza Italia)

- 1 year and 4 months negotiated for fraud on the ministry of Work and the European Economic Community for 474 million lire, in exchange for fake professional qualification courses for his firm.

Gianstefano Frigerio (MP for Forza Italia)

- 3 years and 9 months for corruption in Milan, dumping ground bribes;
- 2 years and 11 months for other two issues in Tangentopoli, among which corruption (both corruzione and concussione variants of the Italian legal system), receiving stolen goods and illegal financing.

Giorgio Galvagno (MP for Forza Italia), former socialist mayor of Asti

- 6 months and 26 days negotiated in 1996 for pollution of aquifer, abuse and omission of due acts in office, false statement, nonintentional crimes against public health (pollution of aquifer) and omitted reporting for the responsibles of the Asti corruption situation in the Vallemanina and Valleandona dumping ground scandal (unlawful waste disposal of toxic waste, in exchange for bribes).

Lino Jannuzzi (senator for Forza Italia)

- 2 years and 4 months for various slander, was graced by the President of the Republic just before being jailed.

Giorgio La Malfa (MP for Italian Republican Party, minister for Community Policies)

- 6 months and 20 days for illegal financing (Enimont bribe).

Roberto Maroni (MP for Northern League and Home Office Minister)

- 4 months and 20 days for resistance against public official during the police raid in the party's building in via Bellerio in Milan.

Augusto Rollandin (senator for Valdostan Union-Democrats of the Left), former president of the regional council of the Aosta Valley

- 16 months and fined 2 million lire in 1994, plus damages to be paid to the Region for abuse in office: he favoured a friend's firm in the assignment of a construction contract for a waste packer in Brissogne. After being removed from his position by the court of Turin, because he was "ineligible", in 2001 he became a candidate for the Valdostan Union and the DS.

Vittorio Sgarbi (MP for Forza Italia)

- 6 months for grand and continued fraud against the state, i.e. the minister of Culture.

Calogero Sodano (senator for UDC), formerly mayor of Agrigento

- 1 year and 6 months for abuse in office aiming to favour illegal construction firms in exchange for voting favours.

Egidio Sterpa (MP for Forza Italia)

- 6 months for the Enimont bribe.

Antonio Tomassini (senator for Forza Italia), surgeon

- 3 years for false statements: during a birth, a baby was born with brain damage. Forza Italia designated him responsible for health in the party and president of the Work Health commission in the Senate.

Vincenzo Visco (MP for Democrats of the Left)

- 10 days and 20 million lire in fine for construction abuse in 2001, because of some illegal works in his house in Pantelleria. He was also ordered to "restore the locations", i.e. demolishing the abusive constructions.

Alfredo Vito (MP for Forza Italia)

- 2 years negotiated and 5 billion lire reboursed for 22 episodes of corruption in Naples.
