= List of mayors of Como =

Mayor of Como
- Sindaco di Como
- Incumbent; Alessandro Rapinese (Ind) since 29 June 2022
- Appointer: Electorate of Como
- Term length: 5 years, renewable once
- Formation: 1860
- Website: Official website

The mayor of Como is an elected politician who, along with the Como City Council, is accountable for the strategic government of Como in Lombardy, Italy.

The current mayor is Alessandro Rapinese, an independent who took office on 29 June 2022.

== Overview ==
According to the Italian Constitution, the mayor of Como is member of the City Council.

The mayor is elected by the population of Como, who also elects the members of the City Council, controlling the mayor's policy guidelines and is able to enforce his resignation by a motion of no confidence. The mayor is entitled to appoint and release the members of his government.

Since 1994 the mayor is elected directly by Como's electorate: in all mayoral elections in Italy in cities with a population higher than 15,000 the voters express a direct choice for the mayor or an indirect choice voting for the party of the candidate's coalition. If no candidate receives at least 50% of votes, the top two candidates go to a second round after two weeks. The election of the city council is based on a direct choice for the candidate with a preference vote: the candidate with the majority of the preferences is elected. The number of the seats for each party is determined proportionally.

== Republic of Italy (since 1946) ==
=== City council election (1946–1994) ===
From 1946 to 1994, the mayor of Como was elected by the city council.

	Mayor	Term start	Term end	Party
1	Giuseppe Terragni	1946	1952	DC
2	Paolo Piadeni	1952	1956	DC
3	Lino Gelpi	1956	1970	DC
4	Antonio Spallino	1970	1985	DC
5	Sergio Simone	1985	1988	PSI
6	Angelo Meda	1988	1990	DC
7	Felice Bernasconi	1990	1992	DC
8	Renzo Pigni	1992	1993	Ind
Special Prefectural Commissioner tenure (1993–1994)

=== Direct election (since 1994) ===
Since 1994, under provisions of new local administration law, the mayor of Como is chosen by direct election, originally every four then every five years.

	Mayor	Term start	Term end	Party	Coalition	Election
9	Alberto Botta	12 July 1994	8 June 1998	FI	FI • AN • CCD	1994
9	Alberto Botta	8 June 1998	28 May 2002	FI	FI • AN • CCD	1998
10	Stefano Bruni	28 May 2002	28 May 2007	FI	FI • LN • AN • UDC	2002
10	Stefano Bruni	28 May 2007	21 May 2012	FI	FI • LN • AN • UDC	2007
11	Mario Lucini	21 May 2012	27 June 2017	PD	PD • SEL	2012
12	Mario Landriscina	27 June 2017	29 June 2022	Ind	FI • LN • FdI	2017
13	Alessandro Rapinese	29 June 2022	Incumbent	Ind	Ind	2022
