= List of mayors of Oristano =

Mayor of Oristano
- Sindaco di Oristano
- Incumbent; Massimiliano Sanna since 16 June 2022
- Appointer: Popular election
- Term length: 5 years, renewable once
- Website: Official website

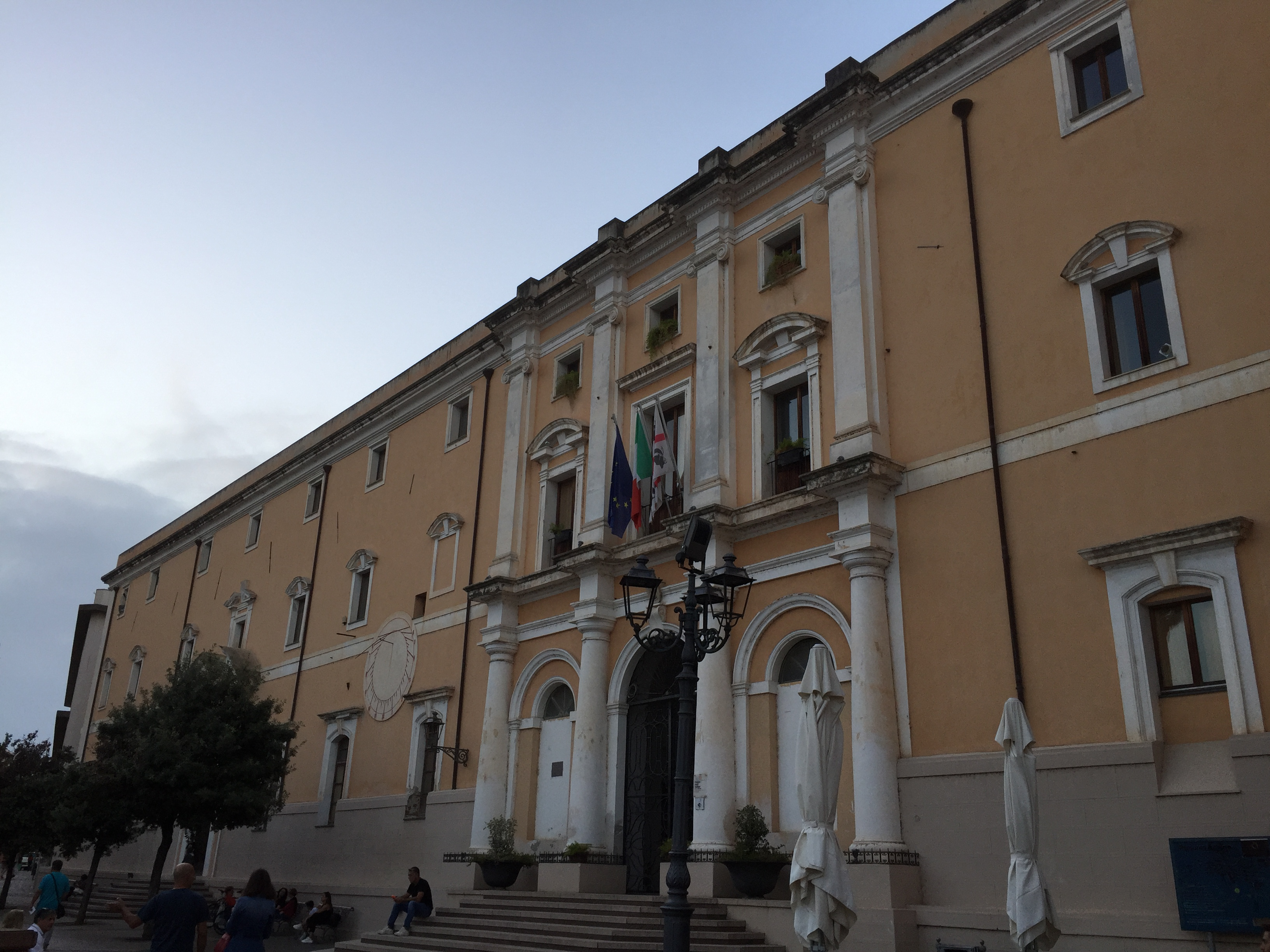
Oristano's Town Hall.

The mayor of Oristano is an elected politician who, along with the Oristano City Council, is accountable for the strategic government of Oristano in Sardinia, Italy.

The current mayor is Massimiliano Sanna, who took office on 16 June 2022.

== Overview ==
According to the Italian Constitution, the mayor of Oristano is member of the City Council.

The mayor is elected by the population of Oristano, who also elects the members of the City Council, controlling the mayor's policy guidelines and is able to enforce his resignation by a motion of no confidence. The mayor is entitled to appoint and release the members of his government.

Since 1994 the mayor is elected directly by Oristano's electorate: in all mayoral elections in Italy in cities with a population higher than 15,000 the voters express a direct choice for the mayor or an indirect choice voting for the party of the candidate's coalition. If no candidate receives at least 50% of votes, the top two candidates go to a second round after two weeks. The election of the City Council is based on a direct choice for the candidate with a preference vote: the candidate with the majority of the preferences is elected. The number of the seats for each party is determined proportionally.

== Italian Republic (since 1946) ==
=== City Council election ===
From 1946 to 1994, the Mayor of Oristano was elected by the City Council.

	Mayor	Term start	Term end	Party
1	Alfredo Corrias	1946	1949	DC
2	Salvatore Annis	1949	1952	DC
3	Gino Carloni	1952	1953	DC
4	Giovanni Canalis	1953	1961	DC
5	Salvatore Manconi	1961	1966	DC
6	Pietro Riccio	1966	1968	DC
7	Sergio Abis	1968	1971	DC
8	Sandro Ladu	1971	1972	DC
9	Vincenzo Loy	1972	1974	DC
10	Manlio Odoni	1974	1975	DC
(8)	Sandro Ladu	1975	1981	DC
11	Ignazio Manunza	1981	1984	DC
12	Lia Dettori Aiello	1984	1985	DC
13	Giorgio Gaviano	1985	1987	DC
14	Franco Mura	1987	1989	PSI
(13)	Giorgio Gaviano	1989	1990	DC
15	Pietro Arca	1990	1993	DC
Special Prefectural Commissioner's tenure (1993–1994)

=== Direct election (since 1994) ===
Since 1994, under provisions of new local administration law, the Mayor of Oristano is chosen by direct election, originally every four, then every five years.

	Mayor	Term start	Term end	Party	Coalition	Election
16	Mariano Scarpa	28 June 1994	8 June 1998	PDS	PDS • PPI • PS	1994
17	Pietro Ortu	8 June 1998	30 July 2001 (Note: Reisgned.)	Ind	CDR • RI • CCD • PSd'Az	1998
Special Prefectural Commissioner's tenure (30 July 2001 – 11 June 2002)
18	Antonio Barberio	11 June 2002	12 June 2007	AN	AN • UDC • FP • RS	2002
19	Angela Eugenia Nonnis	12 June 2007	2 September 2011 (Note: Resigned.)	RS	PdL • RS • UDS • DC	2007
Special Prefectural Commissioner tenure (2 September 2011 – 26 June 2012)
20	Guido Tendas	26 June 2012	26 June 2017	PD	PD • SEL	2012
21	Andrea Lutzu	26 June 2017	16 June 2022	FI	FI • RS • FP	2017
22	Massimiliano Sanna	16 June 2022	Incumbent	RS	FdI • RS • UDC • PSd'Az • FI	2022
