= Alessandro Fadda =

Italian politician (born 1975)

President of the Province of Parma
- Incumbent
- Assumed office 30 September 2024
- Preceded by: Andrea Massari

Mayor of Torrile
- Incumbent
- Assumed office 25 May 2014
- Preceded by: Andrea Rizzoli

Personal details
- Born: 30 January 1975 (age 51) Parma, Italy
- Occupation: Accountant

Alessandro Fadda (born 30 January 1975) is an Italian politician serving as president of the Province of Parma since 2024. He has also served as mayor of Torrile since 2014.

In the 2024 provincial election, Fadda was elected president of the Province of Parma with 54.8% of the weighted vote. He was supported by the Democratic Party, defeating civic candidate Nicola Cesari, mayor of Sorbolo Mezzani.
