= List of mayors of La Spezia =

Mayor of La Spezia
- Sindaco della Spezia

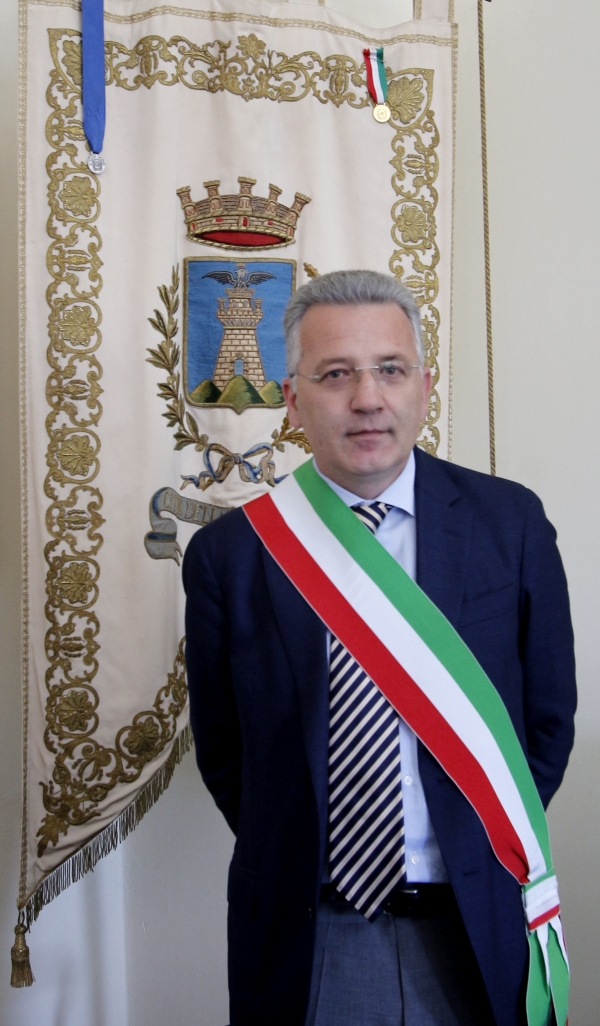
- Incumbent; Pierluigi Peracchini since 29 June 2017
- Appointer: Popular election
- Term length: 5 years, renewable once
- Formation: 1860
- Website: Official website

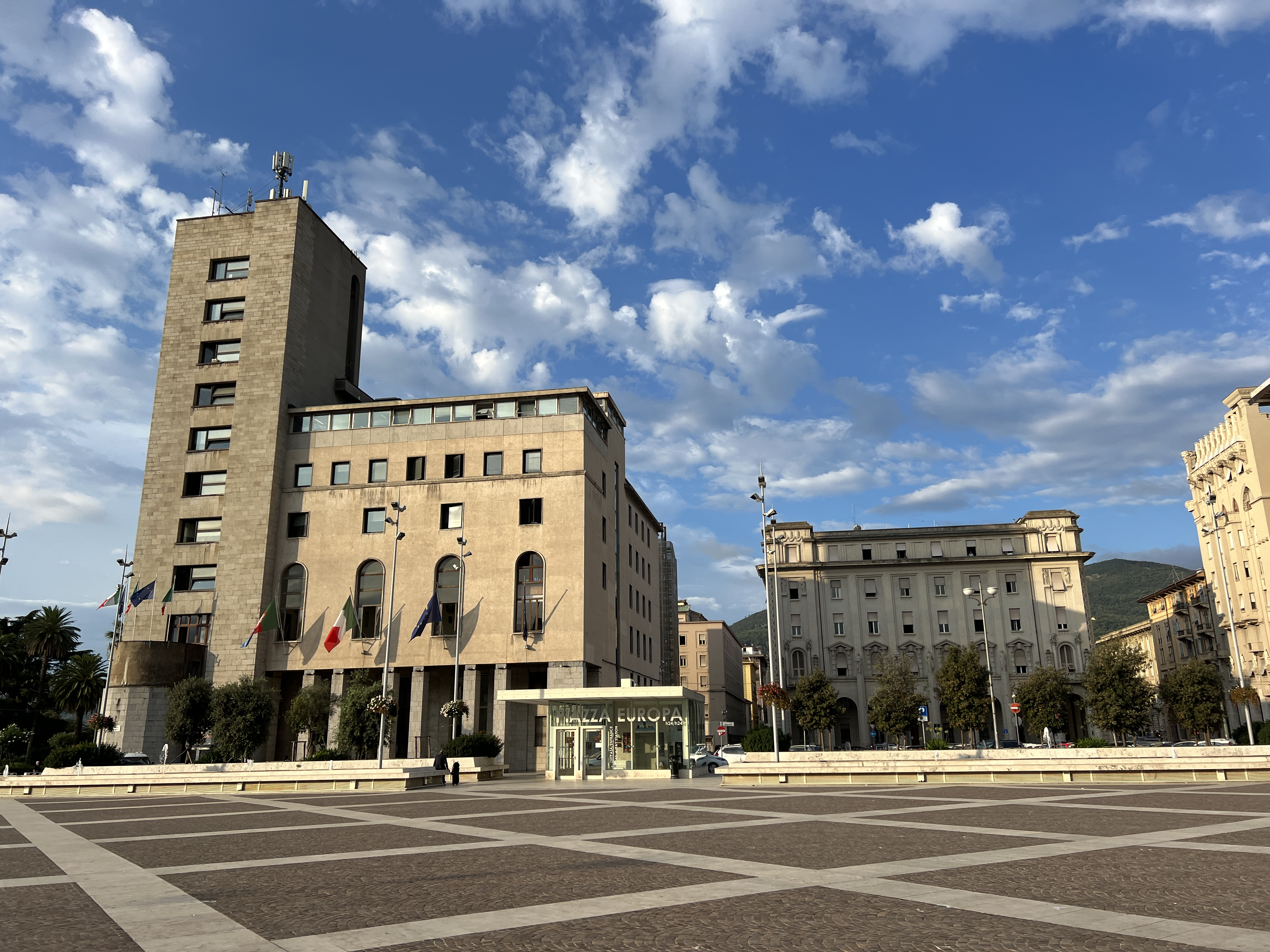
La Spezia's Town Hall.

The mayor of La Spezia is an elected politician who, along with the La Spezia City Council, is accountable for the strategic government of La Spezia in Liguria, Italy.

The current mayor is Pierluigi Peracchini, a centre-right independent, who took office on 29 June 2017.

== Overview ==
According to the Italian Constitution, the mayor of La Spezia is member of the City Council.

The mayor is elected by the population of La Spezia, who also elects the members of the City Council, controlling the mayor's policy guidelines and is able to enforce his resignation by a motion of no confidence. The mayor is entitled to appoint and release the members of his government.

Since 1993 the mayor is elected directly by La Spezia's electorate: in all mayoral elections in Italy in cities with a population higher than 15,000 the voters express a direct choice for the mayor or an indirect choice voting for the party of the candidate's coalition. If no candidate receives at least 50% of votes, the top two candidates go to a second round after two weeks. The election of the City Council is based on a direct choice for the candidate with a preference vote: the candidate with the majority of the preferences is elected. The number of the seats for each party is determined proportionally.

== Italian Republic (since 1946) ==
=== City Council election (1946–1993) ===
From 1946 to 1993, the Mayor of La Spezia was elected by the City Council.

| | Mayor | Term start | Term end | Party |
|---|---|---|---|---|
| 1 | Osvaldo Prosperi | 1946 | 1951 | PCI |
| 2 | Varese Antoni | 1951 | 1957 | PCI |
| 3 | Carlo Alberto Federici | 1957 | 1965 | DC |
| 4 | Ezio Musiani | 1965 | 1969 | DC |
| 5 | Ettore Spora | 1969 | 1970 | DC |
| 6 | Bruno Ferdeghini | 1970 | 1971 | PRI |
| 7 | Walter Corsini | 1971 | 1971 | DC |
| (2) | Varese Antoni | 1971 | 1976 | PCI |
| 8 | Aldo Giacché | 1976 | 1983 | PCI |
| 9 | Sandro Bertagna | 1983 | 1985 | PCI |
| 10 | Bruno Montefiori | 1985 | 1990 | PSI |
| 11 | Gianluigi Buffarato | 1990 | 1992 | PSI |
| 12 | Flavio Luigi Bertone | 1992 | 1993 | PDS |

=== Direct election (since 1993) ===
Since 1993, under provisions of new local administration law, the Mayor of La Spezia is chosen by direct electionis chosen by direct election, originally every four, then every five years.

| | Mayor | Term start | Term end | Party | Coalition | Election |
|---|---|---|---|---|---|---|
| 13 | Roberto Lucio Rosaia | 6 December 1993 | 17 November 1997 | AD | PDS • AD • FdV | 1993 |
| 14 | Giorgio Pagano | 17 November 1997 | 28 May 2002 | PDS; DS | PDS • AD • PRC • PPI | 1997 |
| 14 | Giorgio Pagano | 28 May 2002 | 28 May 2007 | PDS; DS | DS • DL • SDI • PRC | 2002 |
| 15 | Massimo Federici | 28 May 2007 | 7 May 2012 | DS; PD | DS • DL • PdCI • PRC | 2007 |
| 15 | Massimo Federici | 7 May 2012 | 29 June 2017 | DS; PD | PD • SEL • FdS • IdV | 2012 |
| 16 | Pierluigi Peracchini | 29 June 2017 | 14 June 2022 | Ind | FI • Lega • FdI • AP | 2017 |
| 16 | Pierluigi Peracchini | 14 June 2022 | Incumbent | Ind | Lega • FdI • C! • NM | 2022 |
