= Italia in Comune =

Italian political party

- President: Federico Pizzarotti
- Coordinator: Alessio Pascucci
- Founded: 16 April 2018
- Dissolved: 2022
- Split from: Five Star Movement
- Headquarters: Piazzale San Lorenzo 1, Parma
- Ideology: Progressivism; Green politics
- Political position: Centre-left
- National affiliation: More Europe (2019)

Website
- www.italiaincomune.it

Italia in Comune (IiC, English: Italy in Common) was a green and progressive political party in Italy. It was founded in April 2018 by mayor of Parma Federico Pizzarotti, other former members of the Five Star Movement and local non-party independent politicians generally affiliated with the centre-left coalition.

== History ==
In October 2016, mayor of Parma Federico Pizzarotti left the Five Star Movement (M5S) due to disagreements with the movement's founder, Beppe Grillo and his suspension from the party in the previous May. In the 2012 local elections, Pizzarotti had been the first M5S member to win in a big city, with 60.2% of the vote in the run-off (up from 19.5% in the first round).

In the 2017 local elections, Pizzarotti was re-elected mayor without the M5S' support, with 58.9% in the run-off.

In April 2018, Pizzarotti launched Italia in Comune, which aimed at becoming the collector of local "civic lists", as well as disgruntled former M5S members. The party was co-founded by Alessio Pascucci, a left-wing independent who had been elected mayor of Cerveteri, Lazio in 2012 and 2017, supported by civic lists and the Federation of the Greens (FdV).

In October 2018, Serse Soverini, a member of the Chamber of Deputies elected in the 2018 general election as a representative of Civic Area, a minor progressive party close to Romano Prodi, joined IiC and soon became the party's regional coordinator in Emilia-Romagna, the region of Parma and, consequently, IiC's powerbase. Almost a year later, in September 2019, after Matteo Renzi had left to form Italia Viva, Soverini would leave IiC too and join the Democratic Party.

In the early months of 2019 the party became involved in the centre-left coalition, and obtained promising results in regional elections in Abruzzo (3.9% of the vote and one regional councillor) and Sardinia (2.5%). In February Free Alternative, another party formed by M5S splinters, announced that it was merging into IiC.

In the run-up to the 2019 European Parliament election, IiC formed an alliance with the FdV, Green Italia and minor green groups, which would result in a green joint electoral list. However, soon after the party switched allegiances, deserted the FdV and joined forces with More Europe (+E), a liberal party, which was later enlarged to the Italian Socialist Party (PSI).

In the run-up of the 2022 general election IiC lacked activity, and its leading members parted ways. President Pizzarotti formed a National Civic List and successively joined forces with Piercamillo Falasca's L'Italia c'è, Matteo Renzi's Italia Viva and Carlo Calenda's Action, while Alessio Pascucci organised the National Civic Agenda/Network and joined Luigi Di Maio's Civic Commitment. In August 2022, shortly before the election, both groups broke with their would-be allies.

In late 2022 Pizzarotti and Falasca re-joined +E, while continuing to be part of L'Italia c'è. In February 2023 Pizzarotti was elected president of +E. He resigned in 2024 and joined Action.

Following the general election, the party did not take part in any further elections, effectively ceasing to be active. In the 2023 regional elections in Lazio, the founder, Pascucci, stood as a candidate on the Greens and Left list in support of the centre-left candidate Alessio D’Amato, but was not elected. Following the 2024 regional elections, the Sardinian regional branch merged with the Uniti per Todde movement, whilst in the 2025 regional elections in Puglia, the local branch led by Abbaticchio formed the Decaro Presidente list, which later merged with the Prossima movement.

== Electoral results ==
=== European Parliament ===
Election	Leader	Votes	%	Seats	+/–	EP Group
2019	Federico Pizzarotti	833,443 (6th) (Note: In a joint list with More Europe and Italian Socialist Party.)	3.11	0 / 76	New	–

=== Regional Councils ===
Region	Election year	Votes	%	Seats	+/–
Piedmont	2019	11,183 (14th)	0.58	0 / 51	–
Emilia-Romagna	2020	Into BP	–	0 / 50	–
Abruzzo	2019	23,168 (7th)	3.86	1 / 31	▲1
Apulia	2020	64,886 (10th)	3.87	0 / 51	–
Sardinia	2019	17,480 (15th)	2.47	1 / 60	▲1

== Leadership ==
- President: Federico Pizzarotti (2018–2022)
- Coordinator: Alessio Pascucci (2018–2022)
