= List of presidents of the Province of Parma =

President of the Province of Parma
- Presidente della Provincia di Parma
- Incumbent; Alessandro Fadda since 30 September 2024
- Term length: 4 years
- Inaugural holder: Alessandro Todeschi
- Formation: 1889

The president of the Province of Parma is the head of the provincial government in Parma, Emilia-Romagna, Italy. The president oversees the administration of the province, coordinates the activities of the municipalities, and represents the province in regional and national matters.

Since September 2024, the office has been held by Alessandro Fadda of the Democratic Party.

== List ==
=== Presidents of the Provincial Deputation (1889–1927) ===
No.	Portrait	Name	Term of office		Party
No.	Portrait	Name	Start	End	Party
1		Alessandro Todeschi	1889	1892	
2		Celestino Ponzi	1892	1903	
3		Giovanni Lusignani	1903	1914	
4		Primo Lagasi	1914	?	

=== Presidents of the Provincial Rectorate (1928–1945) ===
No.	Portrait	Name	Term of office		Party
No.	Portrait	Name	Start	End	Party
		Angiolo Carrara Verdi	1929	1933	National Fascist Party
		Lupo Corrado Cervi	1933	1943	National Fascist Party

=== Presidents of the Provincial Deputation (1945–1951) ===
No.	Portrait	Name	Term of office		Party
No.	Portrait	Name	Start	End	Party
1		Alvise Jacazio	7 May 1945	1948	?
2		Lodovico Bazini	1948	2 July 1951	?

=== Presidents of the Province (1951–present) ===
No.	Portrait	Name	Term of office		Party	Election
No.	Portrait	Name	Start	End	Party	Election
1		Primo Savani	2 July 1951	28 June 1956	Italian Communist Party	1951
1		Primo Savani	28 June 1956	14 December 1960	Italian Communist Party	1956
2		Luciano Dallatana	14 December 1960	22 February 1965	Italian Socialist Party	1960
3		Giuseppe Righi	22 February 1965	15 October 1970	Italian Socialist Party	1964
4		Ivanoe Sensini	15 October 1970	4 September 1975	Italian Communist Party	1970
5		Arturo Montanini	4 September 1975	17 September 1980	Italian Communist Party	1975
5		Arturo Montanini	17 September 1980	19 September 1985	Italian Communist Party	1980
6		Giovanni Bisi	19 September 1985	14 February 1986	Italian Republican Party	1985
7		William Lucchetti	14 February 1986	20 June 1986	Italian Socialist Party	1985
8		Claudio Magnani	20 June 1986	3 August 1990	Italian Socialist Party	1985
8		Claudio Magnani	3 August 1990	16 May 1995	Italian Socialist Party	1990
9		Corrado Truffelli	16 May 1995	19 July 1999	Italian People's Party	1995
10		Andrea Borri	19 July 1999	7 August 2003	Italian People's Party	1999
11		Vincenzo Bernazzoli	12 July 2004	23 June 2009	Democrats of the Left	2004
11		Vincenzo Bernazzoli	23 June 2009	10 October 2014	Democratic Party	2009
12		Filippo Fritelli	10 October 2014	31 October 2018	Democratic Party	2014
13		Diego Rossi	31 October 2018	18 December 2021	Democratic Party	2018
14		Andrea Massari	18 December 2021	30 September 2024	Democratic Party	2021
15		Alessandro Fadda	30 September 2024	Incumbent	Democratic Party	2024

== Sources ==
- "Storia amministrativa dell'ente". Ministero dell'Interno.
- "I Presidenti della Provincia di Parma". Provincia di Parma. Archived from the original on 27 April 2015.
- Menichini, Piera (2005). "I presidenti delle Province dall'Unità alla Grande guerra: repertorio analitico". Storia Amministrazione Costituzione (13): 271–272.
