= Andrea Lutzu =

Italian politician

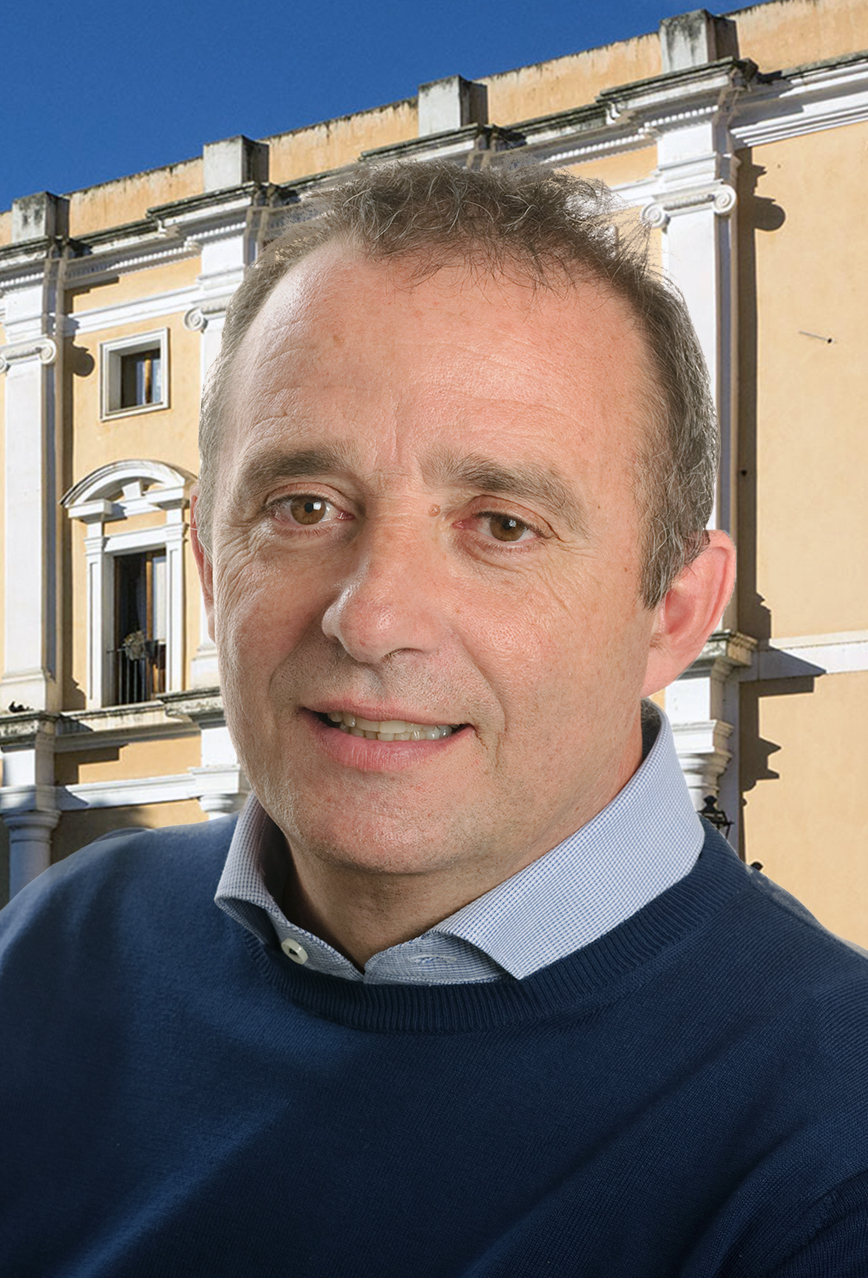
- Andrea Lutzu, mayor of Oristano.

Mayor of Oristano
- In office 26 June 2017 – 16 June 2022
- Preceded by: Guido Tendas
- Succeeded by: Massimiliano Sanna

Personal details
- Born: 18 December 1962 (age 63) Oristano, Sardinia, Italy
- Party: Forza Italia
- Education: University of Cagliari
- Profession: engineer

Andrea Lutzu (born 18 December 1962 in Oristano) is an Italian politician.

He is a member of the centre-right party Forza Italia. He was elected Mayor of Oristano on 25 June 2017 and took office on 26 June.

== See also ==
- 2017 Italian local elections
- List of mayors of Oristano

Political offices
| Preceded by Guido Tendas | Mayor of Oristano since 2017 | Succeeded by |
