= List of presidents of the Province of La Spezia =

President of the Province of La Spezia
- Presidente della Provincia della Spezia

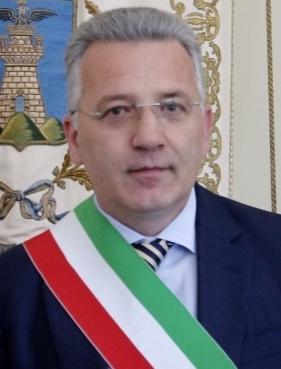
- Incumbent; Pierluigi Peracchini since 28 July 2019
- Term length: 4 years
- Formation: 1923

The president of the Province of La Spezia is the head of the provincial government in La Spezia, Liguria, Italy. The president oversees the administration of the province, coordinates the activities of the municipalities, and represents the province in regional and national matters.

Since July 2019, the office has been held by Pierluigi Peracchini, a centre-right independent. He was re-elected for a second term in 2023.

== List ==
=== Presidents of the Provincial Rectorate (1926–1945) ===
No.	Portrait	Name	Term of office		Party
No.	Portrait	Name	Start	End	Party
1		Luigi Sogani	1926	1932	National Fascist Party
2		Giovanni Battista Bibolini	1932	1935	National Fascist Party
3		Giovanni Bevilacqua	1935	1943	National Fascist Party

=== Presidents of the Province (1951–present) ===
No.	Portrait	Name	Term of office		Party
No.	Portrait	Name	Start	End	Party
1		Agostino Bronzi	1952	1962	Italian Socialist Party
2		Romolo Formentini	1962	1969	Italian Socialist Party
3		Angelo Landi	1970	1975	Italian Socialist Party
4		Ferdinando Pastina	1975	1981	Italian Communist Party
5		Sauro Baruzzo	1981	1985	Italian Socialist Party
6		Francesco Baudone	7 November 1985	28 August 1990	Italian Communist Party
(5)		Sauro Baruzzo	28 August 1990	4 June 1992	Italian Socialist Party
7		Stefano Sgorbini	24 February 1993	17 November 1997	Democratic Party of the Left
8		Giuseppe Ricciardi	17 November 1997	28 May 2002	Italian People's Party; The Daisy
8		Giuseppe Ricciardi	28 May 2002	29 May 2007	Italian People's Party; The Daisy
9		Marino Fiasella	29 May 2007	31 May 2012	Democratic Party
9		Marino Fiasella	31 May 2012	14 October 2014	Special commissioner
10		Massimo Federici	14 October 2014	29 June 2017	Democratic Party
11		Giorgio Cozzani	28 September 2017	25 May 2019	Forza Italia
12		Pierluigi Peracchini	28 July 2019	26 October 2023	Independent (centre-right)
12		Pierluigi Peracchini	26 October 2023	Incumbent	Independent (centre-right)

== Sources ==
- "Storia amministrativa dell'ente". Ministero dell'Interno.
