= Giovanni Battista Bibolini =

Italian industrialist and politician (1875–1955)

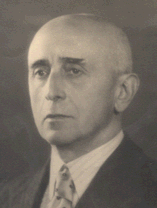

Senator of the Kingdom of Italy
- In office 5 January 1942 – 25 July 1945

Member of the Chamber of Fasces and Corporations
- In office 11 March 1939 – 5 January 1942
- Parliamentary group: Corporation of the Sea and Air

Member of the Chamber of Deputies
- In office 24 March 1929 – 11 March 1939

President of the Province of La Spezia
- In office 1932–1935
- Preceded by: Luigi Sogani
- Succeeded by: Giovanni Bevilacqua

Personal details
- Born: 12 September 1875 Lerici, Italy
- Died: 18 September 1955 (aged 80) Lerici, Italy
- Party: National Fascist Party
- Education: University of Genoa
- Profession: Industrialist, shipowner

Giovanni Battista Bibolini (12 September 1875 – 18 September 1955) was an Italian industrialist, shipowner and National Fascist Party politician. He served as a member of the Chamber of Deputies of the Kingdom of Italy from 1929 to 1939, as a member of the Chamber of Fasces and Corporations from 1939 to 1942, and as a senator from 1942.

== Life and career ==
Born in Lerici, Bibolini graduated in naval and mechanical engineering from the University of Genoa in 1898. He subsequently worked as a naval designer and entered the shipping industry, founding his own shipping company and later a ship-repair and demolition yard. He was also involved in public administration and sporting organisations in the province of La Spezia.

Bibolini entered politics after World War I and was elected to the Chamber of Deputies in 1929 and again in 1934. In 1939 he became a member of the Chamber of Fasces and Corporations, representing the Corporation of the Sea and Air. He was appointed senator on 5 January 1942. He served as president of the Province of La Spezia from 1932 to 1935.

He was president of Spezia Calcio from 1938 to 1941.
