= Lillo Firetto =

Italian politician

Calogero Firetto

Mayor of Agrigento
- In office 3 June 2015 – 21 October 2020
- Preceded by: Marco Zambuto
- Succeeded by: Francesco Miccichè

Mayor of Porto Empedocle
- In office 13 June 2006 – 30 April 2015
- Preceded by: Paolo Ferrara
- Succeeded by: Ida Carmina

Personal details
- Born: 4 September 1965 (age 61) Agrigento, Sicily, Italy
- Party: Union of the Centre
- Education: University of Palermo
- Profession: accountant

Calogero Firetto (born 4 September 1965), commonly referred to as Lillo Firetto, is an Italian politician.

He is a member of the centrist party Union of the Centre and served as Mayor of Porto Empedocle from 2006 to 2015. Firetto was elected Mayor of Agrigento at the 2015 Italian local elections supported by both centre-right and centre-left parties. He took office as mayor on 3 June 2015.

He ran for a second term at the 2020 elections, but lost to the civic candidate Francesco Miccichè.

== See also ==
- 2015 Italian local elections
- List of mayors of Agrigento

Political offices
Preceded by Marco Zambuto	Mayor of Agrigento; 2015–2020	Succeeded by Francesco Miccichè
