= Michele Sodano =

Italian politician (born 1989)

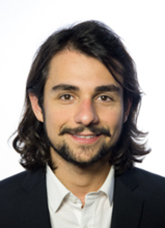

Mayor of Agrigento
- Incumbent
- Assumed office 11 June 2026
- Preceded by: Francesco Miccichè

Member of the Chamber of Deputies
- In office 23 March 2018 – 12 October 2022
- Constituency: Agrigento

Personal details
- Born: 27 June 1989 (age 37) Agrigento, Sicily, Italy
- Party: M5S (until 2021); ControCorrente (since 2025)
- Education: Bocconi University
- Occupation: Project manager

Michele Sodano (born 27 June 1989) is an Italian politician who has served as mayor of Agrigento since 2026. He previously served as a member of the Chamber of Deputies from 2018 to 2022.

Born in Agrigento, Sodano was elected to the Chamber of Deputies in the 2018 Italian general election as a candidate of the Five Star Movement. He later left the party and sat in the Mixed Group for the remainder of his parliamentary term.

In 2026, he was elected mayor of Agrigento as the candidate of a centre-left coalition led by the civic movement ControCorrente. He took office on 11 June 2026.

== Electoral history ==
Election	House	Constituency	Party	Votes	Result
2018	Chamber of Deputies	Sicily 1 – Agrigento	M5S	62,587	Elected

Political offices
Preceded by Francesco Miccichè	Mayor of Agrigento since 2026	Incumbent
