= List of mayors of Parma =

Mayor of Parma
- Sindaco di Parma

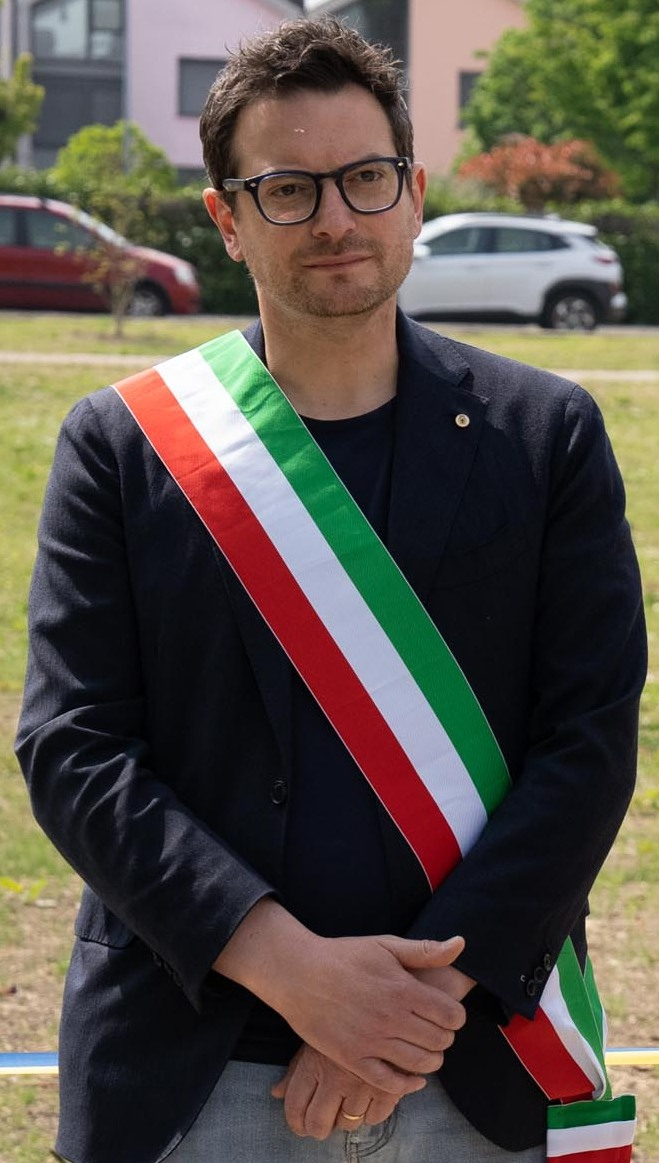
- Incumbent; Michele Guerra (IC) since 1 July 2022
- Appointer: Popular election
- Term length: 5 years, renewable once
- Formation: September 1861
- Website: Official website

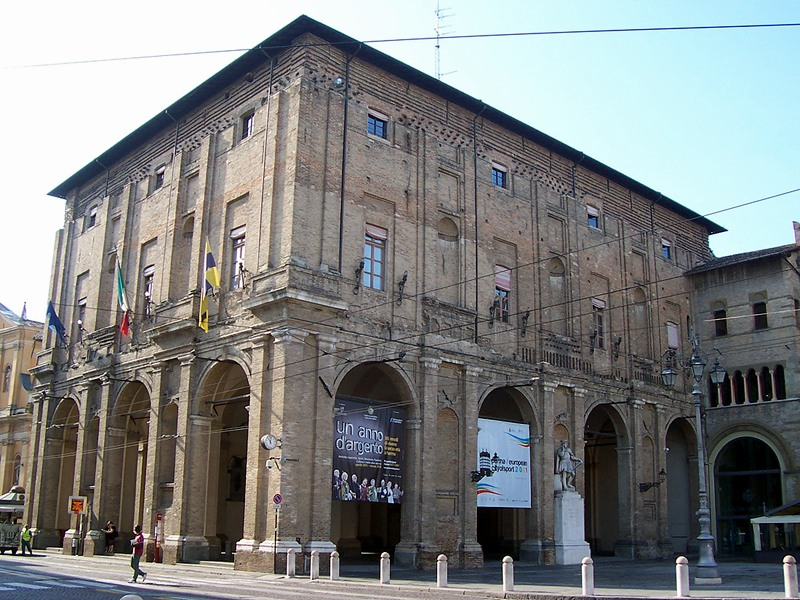
Parma's Town Hall.

The mayor of Parma is an elected politician who, along with the Parma's city council, is accountable for the strategic government of Parma in Emilia-Romagna, Italy.

The current mayor is Michele Guerra (IC), who took office on 1 July 2022.

== Overview ==
According to the Italian Constitution, the mayor of Parma is member of the city council.

The mayor is elected by the population of Parma, who also elect the members of the city council, controlling the mayor's policy guidelines and is able to enforce his resignation by a motion of no confidence. The mayor is entitled to appoint and release the members of his government.

Since 1994 the mayor is elected directly by Parma's electorate: in all mayoral elections in Italy in cities with a population higher than 15,000 the voters express a direct choice for the mayor or an indirect choice voting for the party of the candidate's coalition. If no candidate receives at least 50% of votes, the top two candidates go to a second round after two weeks. The election of the City Council is based on a direct choice for the candidate with a preference vote: the candidate with the majority of the preferences is elected. The number of the seats for each party is determined proportionally.

== Italian Republic (since 1946) ==
=== City Council election (1946-1994) ===
From 1946 to 1994, the Mayor of Parma was elected by the City Council.

	Mayor	Term start	Term end	Party
1	Primo Savani	20 May 1946	3 March 1948	PCI
2	Giuseppe Botteri	3 March 1948	17 October 1951	PCI
3	Giacomo Ferrari	17 October 1951	6 February 1963	PCI
4	Vincenzo Baldassi	6 February 1963	16 October 1970	PCI
5	Cesare Gherri	16 October 1970	1 October 1976	PSI
6	Aldo Cremonini	1 October 1976	10 September 1980	PSI
7	Lauro Grossi	10 September 1980	3 June 1989	PSI
8	Mara Colla	3 June 1989	7 August 1992	PSI
9	Stefano Lavagetto	7 August 1992	13 March 1994	PDS
Special Prefectural Commissioner tenure (13 March – 29 June 1994)

=== Direct election (since 1994) ===
Since 1994, under provisions of new local administration law, the Mayor of Rimini is chosen by direct election, originally every four, and since 2002 every five years.

	Mayor	Took office	Left office	Party	Coalition	Election
(9)	Stefano Lavagetto (1935–2005)	29 June 1994	8 June 1998	PDS	PDS	1994
10	Elvio Ubaldi (1947–2014)	8 June 1998	26 May 2002	Ind	FI • CCD	1998
10	Elvio Ubaldi (1947–2014)	26 May 2002	21 June 2007	Ind	FI • UDC	2002
11	Pietro Vignali (b. 1968)	21 June 2007	28 September 2011 (Note: Resigned.)	FI	FI • UDC	2007
Special Prefectural Commissioner tenure (28 September 2011 – 25 May 2012)
12	Federico Pizzarotti (b. 1973)	25 May 2012	30 June 2017	M5S; IC	M5S	2012
12	Federico Pizzarotti (b. 1973)	30 June 2017	1 July 2022	M5S; IC	IC	2017
13	Michele Guerra (b. 1982)	1 July 2022	Incumbent	IC	IC • PD • SI	2022
