= List of mayors of Gorizia =

Mayor of Gorizia
- Sindaco di Gorizia

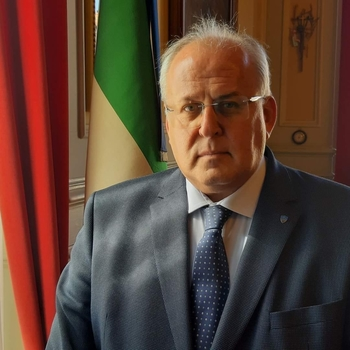
- Incumbent; Rodolfo Ziberna since 26 June 2017
- Appointer: Popular election
- Term length: 5 years, renewable once
- Formation: 1918
- Website: Official website

The mayor of Gorizia is an elected politician who, along with the Gorizia City Council, is accountable for the strategic government of Gorizia in Friuli-Venezia Giulia, Italy.

The current mayor is Rodolfo Ziberna (FI), who took office on 26 June 2017.

== Overview ==
According to the Italian Constitution, the mayor of Gorizia is member of the City Council.

The mayor is elected by the population of Gorizia, who also elects the members of the City Council, controlling the mayor's policy guidelines and is able to enforce his resignation by a motion of no confidence. The mayor is entitled to appoint and release the members of his government.

Since 1994 the mayor is elected directly by Gorizia's electorate: in all mayoral elections in Italy in cities with a population higher than 15,000 the voters express a direct choice for the mayor or an indirect choice voting for the party of the candidate's coalition. If no candidate receives at least 50% of votes, the top two candidates go to a second round after two weeks. The election of the City Council is based on a direct choice for the candidate with a preference vote: the candidate with the majority of the preferences is elected. The number of the seats for each party is determined proportionally.

== Kingdom of Italy (1918–1946) ==
The office of Mayor of Gorizia was established in 1918 and it was elected by the City's council. In 1926, the Fascist dictatorship abolished mayors and City councils, replacing them with an authoritarian Podestà chosen by the National Fascist Party. The office of mayor was restored in 1945 during the Allied occupation.

	Mayor	Term start	Term end	Party
1	Giorgio Bombi	1918	1922	
2	Antonio Bonne	1922	1922	
(1)	Giorgio Bombi	1924	1926	
Fascist Podestà (1926–1945)
1	Giorgio Bombi	1926	1934	PNF
2	Valentino Pascoli	1934	1938	PNF
3	Antonio Casasola	1939	1943	PNF
4	Luigi Sussi	1943	1944	PFR
5	Alessio Coronini Cronberg	1944	1945	PFR
Allied occupation (1945–1948)
3	Giovanni Stecchina	1945	1948	PRI

== Italian Republic (since 1946) ==
=== City Council election (1948–1994) ===
From 1948 to 1994, the mayor of Gorizia was elected by the City Council.

	Mayor	Term start	Term end	Party
1	Ferruccio Bernardis	1948	1961	DC
2	Luigi Poterzio	1961	1964	DC
3	Franco Gallarotti	1964	1965	DC
4	Michele Martina	1965	1972	DC
5	Pasquale De Simone	1972	1980	DC
6	Antonio Scarano	1980	1992	DC
7	Erminio Tuzzi	1992	1993	DC

=== Direct election (since 1994) ===
Since 1994, under provisions of new local administration law, the mayor of Gorizia is chosen by direct election, originally every four, then every five years.

	Mayor	Term start	Term end	Party	Coalition	Election
8	Gaetano Valenti	27 June 1994	30 June 1998	FI	FI • AN	1994
8	Gaetano Valenti	30 June 1998	11 June 2002	FI	FI • AN • CCD	1998
9	Vittorio Brancati	11 June 2002	29 May 2007	DL	DS • DL • PRC	2002
10	Ettore Romoli	29 May 2007	7 May 2012	PdL; FI	FI • AN • UDC • LN • FT	2007
10	Ettore Romoli	7 May 2012	26 June 2017	PdL; FI	PdL • UDC • LN • PP	2012
11	Rodolfo Ziberna	26 June 2017	27 June 2022	FI	FI • FdI • Lega • UDC	2017
11	Rodolfo Ziberna	27 June 2022	Incumbent	FI	FI • FdI • Lega • NcI	2022
