= Rodolfo Ziberna =

Italian politician (born 1961)

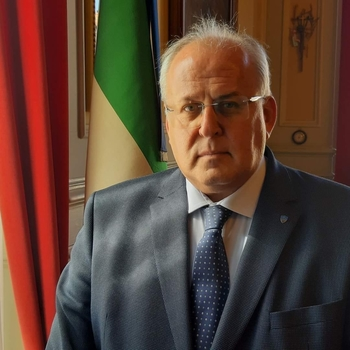

Mayor of Gorizia
- Incumbent
- Assumed office 26 June 2017
- Preceded by: Ettore Romoli

Personal details
- Born: 29 November 1961 (age 64) Gorizia, Friuli-Venezia Giulia, Italy
- Party: PSDI (1980-1994); Forza Italia (1994-2009; since 2013); PdL (2009-2013)
- Education: University of Bologna

Rodolfo Ziberna (born 11 November 1961 in Gorizia) is an Italian politician.

He is a member of the centre-right party Forza Italia. He was elected Mayor of Gorizia on 25 June 2017 and took office the following day.

== See also ==
- 2017 Italian local elections
- List of mayors of Gorizia

Political offices
Preceded by Ettore Romoli	Mayor of Gorizia since 2017	Succeeded by
