= List of mayors of Rieti =

Mayor of Rieti
- Sindaco di Rieti

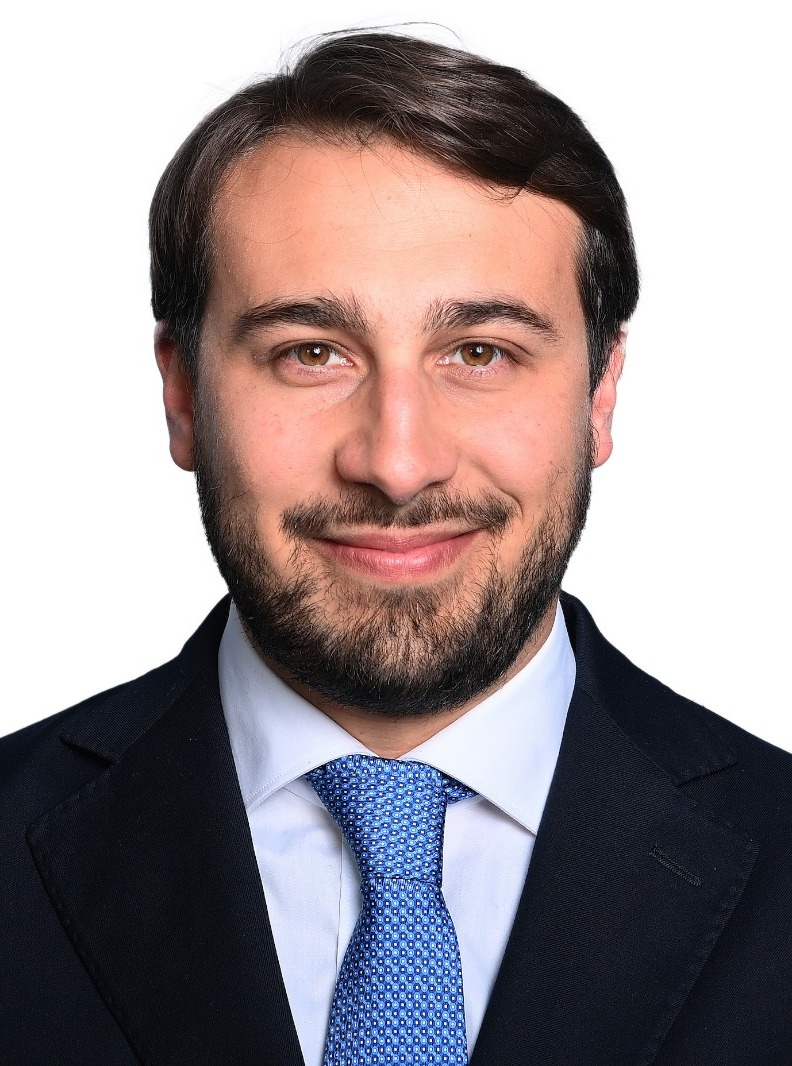
- Incumbent; Daniele Sinibaldi since 20 June 2022
- Appointer: Popular election
- Term length: 5 years, renewable once
- Formation: 1870
- Website: Official website

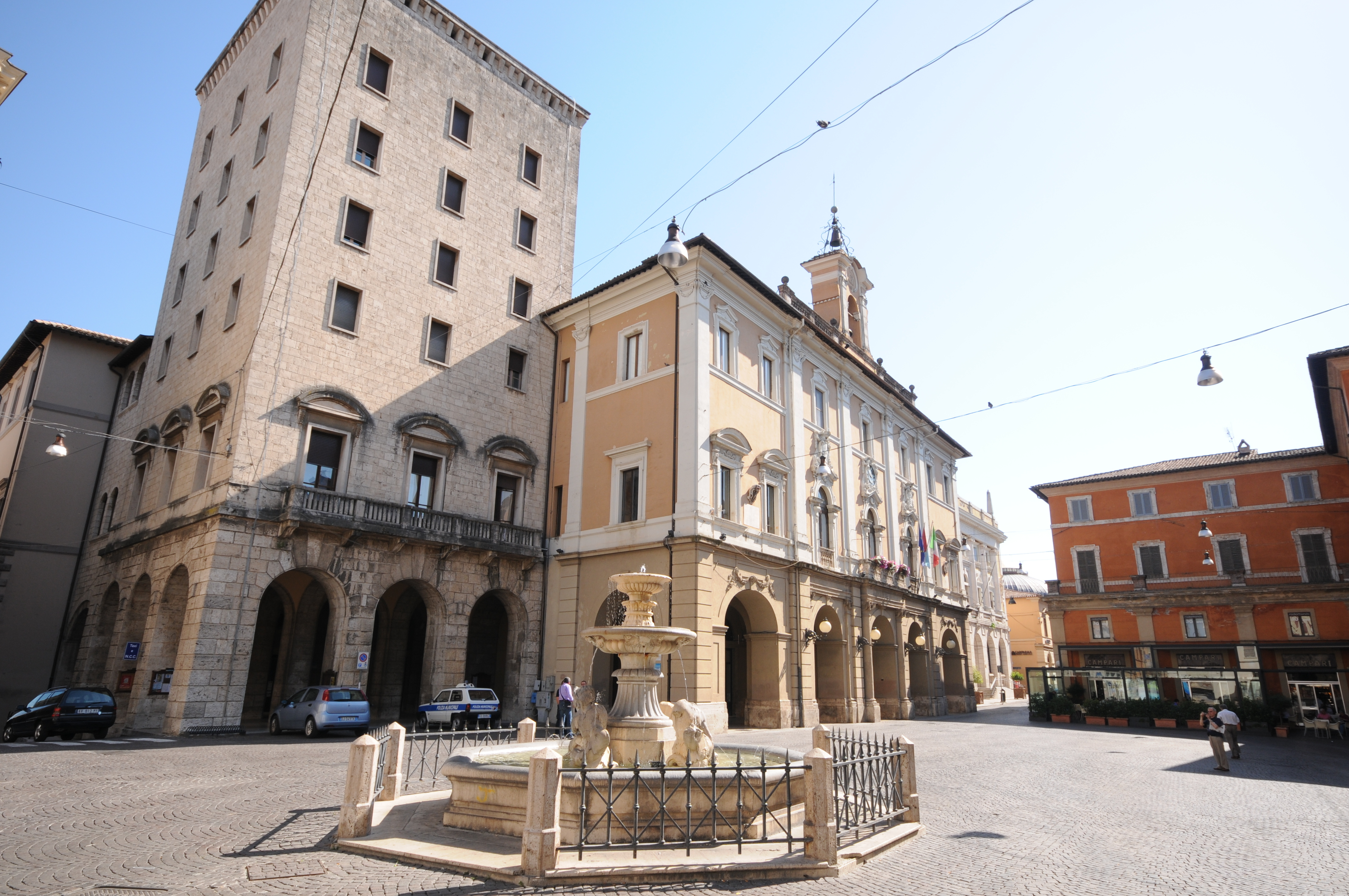
Rieti's Town Hall.

The mayor of Rieti is an elected politician who, along with the Rieti City Council, is accountable for the strategic government of Rieti in Lazio, Italy.

The current mayor is Daniele Sinibaldi (FdI), who took office on 20 June 2022.

== Overview ==
According to the Italian Constitution, the mayor of Rieti is member of the City Council.

The mayor is elected by the population of Rieti, who also elects the members of the City Council, controlling the mayor's policy guidelines and is able to enforce his resignation by a motion of no confidence. The mayor is entitled to appoint and release the members of his government.

Since 1995 the mayor is elected directly by Rieti's electorate: in all mayoral elections in Italy in cities with a population higher than 15,000 the voters express a direct choice for the mayor or an indirect choice voting for the party of the candidate's coalition. If no candidate receives at least 50% of votes, the top two candidates go to a second round after two weeks. The election of the City Council is based on a direct choice for the candidate with a preference vote: the candidate with the majority of the preferences is elected. The number of the seats for each party is determined proportionally.

== Italian Republic (since 1946) ==
=== City Council election (1946-1994) ===
From 1946 to 1994, the Mayor of Rieti was elected by the City Council.

	Mayor	Term start	Term end	Party
1	Angelo Sacchetti Sassetti	7 April 1946	14 July 1952	PSIUP
2	Lionello Matteucci	14 July 1952	30 July 1952	PSI
(1)	Angelo Sacchetti Sassetti	30 July 1952	25 August 1952	PSI
(2)	Lionello Matteucci	25 August 1952	30 May 1957	PSI
3	Valerio De Santis	30 May 1957	29 January 1961	PSI
4	Giulio De Juliis	29 January 1961	30 September 1970	PSI
5	Pietro Aloisi	30 September 1970	21 November 1974	PSI
6	Ettore Saletti	21 November 1974	10 March 1982	PRI
7	Bruno Vella	10 March 1982	13 September 1983	PSI
8	Augusto Giovannelli	13 September 1983	15 February 1988	PSI
9	Paolo Tigli	15 February 1988	30 July 1990	PCI
10	Lamberto Tabellini	30 July 1990	10 December 1992	PSI
11	Paolo Bigliocchi	10 December 1992	5 November 1993	PSI
Special Prefectural Commissioner's tenure (5 November 1993 – 27 June 1994)

=== Direct election (since 1994) ===
Since 1994, under provisions of new local administration law, the Mayor of Rieti is chosen by direct election, originally every four, then every five years.

	Mayor	Term start	Term end	Party	Coalition	Election
12	Antonio Cicchetti	27 June 1994	26 May 1998	AN	FI • AN • CCD • LN	1994
12	Antonio Cicchetti	26 May 1998	28 May 2002	AN	FI • AN • CCD	1998
13	Giuseppe Emili	28 May 2002	28 May 2007	AN; PdL	FI • AN • UDC	2002
13	Giuseppe Emili	28 May 2007	22 May 2012	AN; PdL	FI • AN • UDC	2007
14	Simone Petrangeli	22 May 2012	27 June 2017	SEL	PD • SEL • FdS • IdV	2012
(12)	Antonio Cicchetti	27 June 2017	20 June 2022	FI	FI • FdI	2017
15	Daniele Sinibaldi	20 June 2022	Incumbent	FdI	FI • FdI • Lega	2022
