= Daniele Sinibaldi =

Italian politician (born 1986)

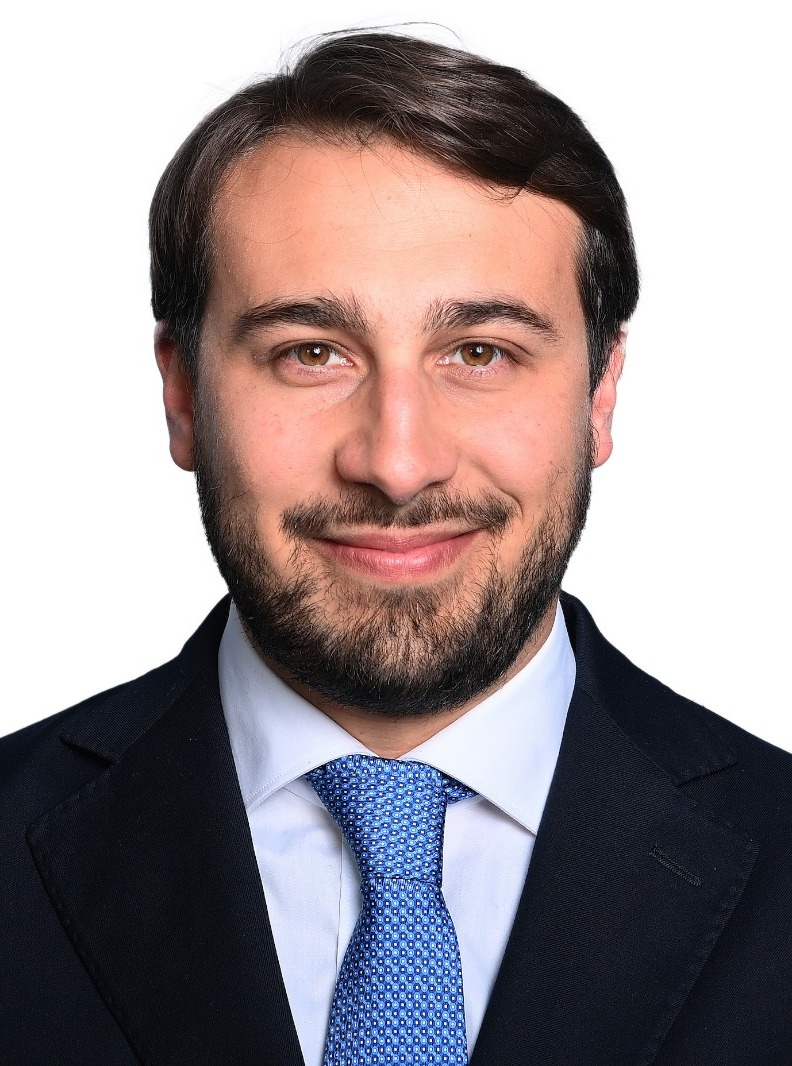
- Sinibaldi in 2022

Mayor of Rieti
- Incumbent
- Assumed office 20 June 2022
- Preceded by: Antonio Cicchetti

Personal details
- Born: 24 April 1986 (age 40)
- Party: Brothers of Italy (since 2012)

Daniele Sinibaldi (born 24 April 1986) is an Italian politician serving as mayor of Rieti since 2022. From 2017 to 2022, he served as deputy mayor and assessor for productive activities under his predecessor Antonio Cicchetti. He has served as president of ANCI Lazio since 2024. In 2018, he was appointed spokesperson of Brothers of Italy in the province of Rieti.
