= Marco Zambuto =

Italian politician (born 1973)

Mayor of Agrigento
- In office 28 May 2007 – 13 June 2014
- Preceded by: Aldo Piazza
- Succeeded by: Lillo Firetto

Personal details
- Born: 10 April 1973 (age 53) Agrigento, Italy
- Party: Forza Italia (since 2019)
- Other political affiliations: DC (until 1994); UC (1995–2002); UdC (2002–2008; 2010–2013); PdL (2008–2010); PD (2013–2019)
- Education: University of Palermo
- Profession: Lawyer

Marco Zambuto (born 10 April 1973) is an Italian politician.

== Early life and education ==
Zambuto was born on 10 April 1973 in Agrigento, in the Sicily region. He attended the liceo classico (named after Empedocles), where he was for several years the institute representative, and was also the provincial representative of Agrigento students. He graduated in law at the University of Palermo. He is a lawyer since 1999.

== Career ==
Zambuto began his political career in Christian Democracy (DC). In 1993, he was elected municipal councilor of Agrigento on the DC list . After the DC dissolved in 1994, he joined the United Christian Democrats (CDU) in 1995 and he was re-elected with the CDU party in 1997. In 2004, Zambuto became the municipal budget councilor of Agrigento. He ran for mayor of Agrigento at the 2007 Italian local elections, supported by a coalition composed of the Union of the Centre (UdC), Democrats of the Left (DS), and UDEUR. He was elected at the second round and took office on 29 May 2007.

During the 2012 Italian local elections, Zambuto was re-elected for a second term as mayor of Agrigento on 23 May 2012. He resigned on 13 June 2014; this came after a conviction for abuse of office, which was overturned on appeal five months later. In 2023, alongside Action politicians Carlo Calenda, Enrico Costa, and Mariastella Gelmini, Zambuto put forward a law proposal to decriminalize the abuse of office.

After a period as member of The People of Freedom (PdL) from 2008 to 2010, Zambuto joined the Democratic Party (PD) under the party's new secretary Matteo Renzi in 2013. On 31 March 2015, Zambuto resigned from the position of president of the Regional Assembly of the PD in Sicily following a controversy sparked by his visit to Silvio Berlusconi in Arcore. He left the PD in 2019 and joined Berlusconi's Forza Italia (FI). In 2020, he ran again for mayor of Agrigento, supported by FI, UdC, and DiventeràBellissima but was not elected. On 4 January 2021, he was appointed regional councilor for local authorities and public functions by the then Sicily president Nello Musumeci; he held this position until 2022.

For the 2024 European Parliament election in Italy, Zambuto is considered to be a candidate within Salvatore Cuffaro's Christian Democracy Sicily (DCS) as part of a deal between Renzi and Cuffaro, who is Zambuto's brother-in-law, for Renew Europe's United States of Europe list in Italy. This caused controversy and opposition among Italian liberals, including Calenda and More Europe president Federico Pizzarotti.

Political offices
Preceded by Aldo Piazza	Mayor of Agrigento; 2007–2014	Succeeded by Lillo Firetto
