= Andrea Borri =

Italian politician (1935–2003)

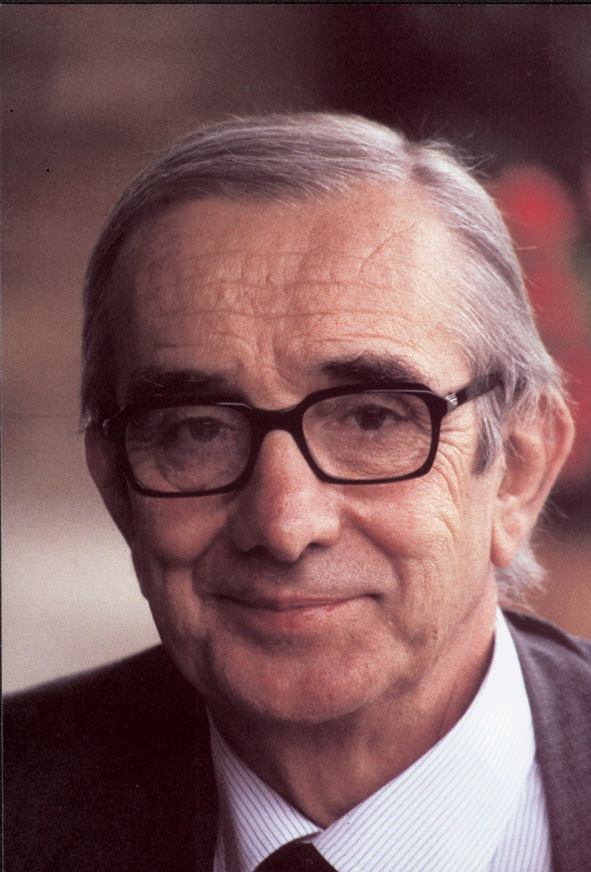

President of the Province of Parma
- In office 19 July 1999 – 7 August 2003
- Preceded by: Corrado Truffelli
- Succeeded by: Vincenzo Bernazzoli

Member of the Chamber of Deputies
- In office 5 July 1976 – 14 April 1994

President of the Parliamentary Commission for the General Direction and Supervision of Radio and Television Services
- In office 9 October 1987 – 22 April 1992
- Preceded by: Rosa Russo Iervolino
- Succeeded by: Luciano Radi

Personal details
- Born: 13 July 1935 Parma, Kingdom of Italy
- Died: 7 August 2003 (aged 68) Monticelli Terme, Montechiarugolo, Emilia-Romagna, Italy
- Party: Christian Democracy; Italian People's Party; The Daisy
- Education: University of Parma
- Profession: Notary

Andrea Borri (13 July 1935 – 7 August 2003) was an Italian politician and notary. A member of Christian Democracy, he served as a member of the Chamber of Deputies from 1976 to 1994 and as president of the Parliamentary Commission for the General Direction and Supervision of Radio and Television Services from 1987 to 1992. From 1999 until his death in 2003, he was president of the Province of Parma.
