= Francesco Miccichè (politician) =

Italian politician

Mayor of Agrigento
- In office 21 October 2020 – 11 June 2026
- Preceded by: Lillo Firetto
- Succeeded by: Michele Sodano

Personal details
- Born: 15 May 1958 (age 68) Agrigento, Sicily, Italy
- Party: Independent
- Education: University of Pisa; University of Palermo
- Profession: physician

Francesco Miccichè, also known as Franco Miccichè (born 15 May 1958), is an Italian politician and physician.

He served as assessor to safety and health policies during the term of mayor Lillo Firetto in Agrigento from 2015 to 2017. Miccichè was elected Mayor of Agrigento at the 2020 Italian local elections supported by a coalition of civic lists and took office on 21 October 2020.

== See also ==
- 2020 Italian local elections
- List of mayors of Agrigento

Political offices
Preceded by Lillo Firetto	Mayor of Agrigento; 2020–2026	Succeeded by Michele Sodano
