= Pierluigi Peracchini =

Italian politician

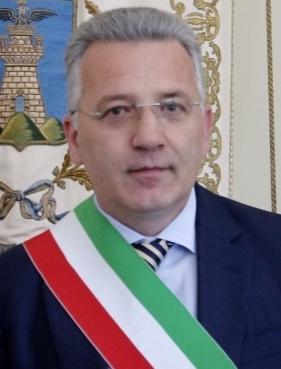

President of the Province of La Spezia
- Incumbent
- Assumed office 28 July 2019
- Preceded by: Giorgio Cozzani

Mayor of La Spezia
- Incumbent
- Assumed office 29 June 2017
- Preceded by: Massimo Federici

Personal details
- Born: 23 December 1964 (age 61) Salò, Province of Brescia, Italy
- Party: Centre-right independent
- Education: University of Urbino

Pierluigi Peracchini (born 23 December 1964) is an Italian politician.

Peracchini ran as an independent for the office of mayor of La Spezia at the 2017 Italian local elections, supported by a centre-right coalition. He won and took office on 29 June 2017.

He was elected president of the Province of La Spezia on 28 July 2019.

== See also ==
- 2017 Italian local elections
- 2022 Italian local elections
- List of mayors of La Spezia

Political offices
Preceded by Massimo Federici	Mayor of La Spezia since 2017	Incumbent
Preceded by Giorgio Cozzani	President of the Province of La Spezia since 2019	Incumbent
