= Primo Savani =

Italian lawyer and politician (1897–1977)

President of the Province of Parma
- In office 2 July 1951 – 14 December 1960
- Preceded by: Lodovico Bazini
- Succeeded by: Luciano Dallatana

Mayor of Parma
- In office 20 May 1946 – 3 March 1948
- Preceded by: Mario Bocchi
- Succeeded by: Giuseppe Botteri

Personal details
- Born: 12 March 1897 Berceto, Province of Parma, Kingdom of Italy
- Died: 15 January 1977 (aged 79) Parma, Italy
- Party: Italian Communist Party
- Education: University of Parma
- Profession: Lawyer

Primo Savani (12 March 1897 – 15 January 1977) was an Italian lawyer, partisan and politician. A member of the Italian Communist Party, he served as mayor of Parma from 1946 to 1948 and as president of the Province of Parma from 1951 to 1960. Savani was an opponent of fascism and participated in the Italian resistance movement, using the partisan name "Mauri".

== Sources ==
- Lasagni, Roberto (1999). Dizionario biografico dei Parmigiani. Parma: PPS.
- Marcheselli, Tiziano (1990). Strade di Parma. Vol. III. Parma: Tipolitografia Benedettina. pp. 70–71.
- Savani, Primo (1972). Antifascismo e guerra di liberazione a Parma. Cronache dei tempi. Parma: Guanda.
