= Aldo Piazza =

Italian politician (born 1965)

Mayor of Agrigento
- In office 26 November 2001 – 28 May 2007
- Preceded by: Calogero Sodano
- Succeeded by: Marco Zambuto

Personal details
- Born: 19 November 1956 (age 69) Agrigento, Italy
- Party: UDC (since 2002)
- Other political affiliations: DC (until 1994); CCD (1994–2002)
- Profession: Politician

Aldo Piazza (born 19 November 1956) is an Italian politician and mayor of Agrigento from 2001 to 2007.

== Life and career ==
Aldo Piazza was born on 19 November 1956 in Agrigento, Italy. He began his political career in 1982 as an official at the Provincial Labour Office in Agrigento. He entered local politics in 1993, when he was elected to the Agrigento city council with 1,147 votes.

Piazza was elected as the mayor of Agrigento in 2001 with a total of 76.4% of the votes. He worked as the candidate of the centre-right coalition Casa delle Libertà. During his administration, the city approved an updated urban development plan and advanced infrastructure projects connected to water supply and redevelopment of the historic centre.

After leaving office in 2007, Piazza remained active in local politics. In 2019, he announced his intention to run again for mayor of Agrigento in the 2020 municipal election, criticizing the deterioration of public services and urban conditions in the city. In August 2020, however, he withdrew his candidacy and endorsed Francesco Miccichè.

== Controversy ==
In June 2010, Piazza was acquitted of abusing the office. He was sentenced to five months in prison.

Political offices
Preceded by Calogero Sodano	Mayor of Agrigento; 2001–2007	Succeeded by Marco Zambuto
