= Renzo Pigni =

Italian politician (1925–2019)

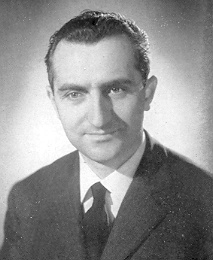

Mayor of Como
- In office 30 October 1992 – October 1993
- Preceded by: Felice Bernasconi
- Succeeded by: Armando Levante

Personal details
- Born: Renzo Pigni; 24 September 1925 Fagnano Olona, Italy
- Died: 25 January 2019 (aged 93)
- Party: PSI, PSIUP, independent

Renzo Pigni (24 September 1925 – 25 January 2019) was an Italian politician who served as a Deputy (from 1953 to 1972) and as Mayor of Como (from 1992 to 1993).
