= Guido Tendas =

Italian politician

Mayor of Oristano
- In office 26 June 2012 – 26 June 2017
- Preceded by: Angela Eugenia Nonnis
- Succeeded by: Andrea Lutzu

Personal details
- Born: 17 July 1950 (age 76) Solarussa, Sardinia, Italy
- Party: Democrats of the Left; Democratic Party
- Education: Università Cattolica del Sacro Cuore
- Profession: teacher

Guido Tendas (born 17 July 1950 in Solarussa) is an Italian politician.

He is a member of the Democratic Party.

He was elected Mayor of Oristano on 25 June 2012 and took office on 26 June. In 2017 he refused to run for a second term.

== Biography ==
He served as deputy mayor and city councilor for the municipality of Oristano from 1994 to 1998, during Mariano Scarpa’s term in office. Re-elected in the subsequent municipal elections, he served as a city councilor from 1998 to 2007 as a member of the Democrats of the Left.

As a candidate for mayor of Oristano in the 2012 municipal elections, leading a center-left coalition consisting of the Democratic Party (Italy), Left Ecology Freedom, the Federation of the Left, and civic lists, he was elected mayor on June 25, 2012, in the second round against his opponent Giuliano Uras of the Union of the Center, with 58% of the vote. In 2017, he decided not to run for a second term as mayor.

== See also ==
- 2012 Italian local elections
- List of mayors of Oristano

Political offices
Preceded by Angela Eugenia Nonnis	Mayor of Oristano; 2012–2017	Succeeded by Andrea Lutzu
