= Calogero Sodano =

Italian politician (born 1946)

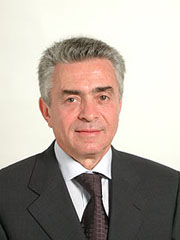

Member of the Senate of the Republic
- In office 30 May 2001 – 27 April 2006
- Constituency: Agrigento

Mayor of Agrigento
- In office 20 June 1993 – 26 November 2001
- Preceded by: Roberto Di Mauro
- Succeeded by: Aldo Piazza
- In office 17 September 1985 – 2 March 1986
- Preceded by: Calogero Zambuto
- Succeeded by: Emanuele Mattiolo

Personal details
- Born: 24 September 1946 (age 80) Agrigento, Italy
- Party: UDC (2002–2006)
- Other political affiliations: DC (until 1986); PRI (1986–1997); CCD (1997–2002)
- Education: University of Palermo
- Profession: INPS Manager

Calogero Sodano (born September 24, 1946 in Agrigento) is an Italian politician and mayor of Agrigento from 1985 to 1986, and 1993 to 2001. He is also member of the Senate of the Republic from 2001 to 2006.

== Life and career ==
Calogero Sodano was born on September 24, 1946 in Agrigento, Italy. He graduated in Political Science from University of Palermo and later worked as a manager for the Italian National Social Security Institute (INPS).

In 1986, Sodano was elected as the mayor of Agrigento for the first time by the city council. Six months later, he resigned from the position and left the party to join Italian Republican Party where he held the position of provincial councillor and coordinator. In 1992, he ran for the Senate of the Republic with in the Agrigento constituency.

In 1993, Sodano was elected mayor of Agrigento in the second round, beating his opponent, Giuseppe Arnone by 435 votes. Concerning that election, legal proceedings were later initiated following statements made by the gang boss of Agrigento, Maurizio Di Gati. Sodano was acquitted at first instance, and the acquittal was subsequently confirmed on appeal. He was then reconfirmed as mayor in 1997, with a percentage of 54.8%.

In 1997, Sodano was sent to trial for the crime of abuse of office together with four other former mayors of Agrigento for having allowed building abuses in the archaeological area of Valle dei Templi. In 2010, the Supreme Court of Cassation made the conviction for building abuse definitive against Sodano, who was also sentenced to pay damages to the environmentalist associations with Italia Nostra and Legambiente. In the 1999 European parliament elections, he was a candidate on the CCD lists, but was not elected.

In 2001, he resigned to run for the Senate of the Republic for the House of Freedoms in the single-member constituency of Agrigento, where he was elected with 49,398 votes.

In April 2014, Sodano presented his first book, Meglio un giorno da sindaco, published by Vertigo, which was presented in the Zeus Hall of the Archaeological Museum of Agrigento in the presence of Vittorio Sgarbi, who edited the preface of the volume.
