= Antonio Cicchetti =

Italian politician

Mayor of Rieti
- In office 27 June 2017 – 20 June 2022
- Preceded by: Simone Petrangeli
- Succeeded by: Daniele Sinibaldi
- In office 27 June 1994 – 28 May 2002
- Preceded by: Paolo Bigliocchi
- Succeeded by: Giuseppe Emili

Member of the Regional Council of Lazio
- In office 3 May 2005 – 25 February 2013

Personal details
- Born: 28 March 1952 (age 74) Rieti, Italy
- Party: MSI (till 1995); AN (1995-2009); PdL (2009-2013); Forza Italia (since 2013)
- Occupation: Politician

Antonio Cicchetti (born 28 March 1952) is an Italian politician, three times mayor of Rieti, and a member of Forza Italia.

== Biography ==
Cicchetti was born in Rieti, Italy; he became local leader of the Youth Front and, subsequently, of the Italian Social Movement – National Right. In 1975 Cicchetti became City Councilor in the municipality of Rieti and was part of the opposition until 1994.

In 1994 he was elected mayor of Rieti, and was re-elected in 1998; his government ended in 2002.

In 2005 he was elected Councilor at the Lazio regional council, and was re-elected in 2010. From April to June 2010, Cicchetti served as the Culture assessor in the regional government of Renata Polverini, but subsequently got ousted.

In the early elections which took place in February 2013, following the resignation of Polverini, Cicchetti ran again for councilor in the PDL party; he gained 5 thousand votes of preference, but they did not suffice for re-election.

In 2017 Cicchetti ran for the seat of Mayor of Rieti, and got elected for the third time.

== Private life ==
Cicchetti is married and has children.

Political offices
Preceded by Simone Petrangeli	Mayor of Rieti; 2017–2022	Succeeded by Daniele Sinibaldi
Preceded by Paolo Bigliocchi	Mayor of Rieti; 1994–2002	Succeeded by Giuseppe Emili
