= ControCorrente =

Upstream ControCorrente
- Leader: Ismaele La Vardera
- Founded: 14 February 2025
- Split from: South calls North
- Ideology: Regionalism; Anti-establishment
- National affiliation: Civic Project Italy
- Sicilian Regional Assembly: 4 / 70

Website
- siciliacontrocorrente.it

ControCorrente (lit. 'Upstream', CC), whose complete neame is Upstream – Fighting to Remain (Italian: ControCorrente – Lottare per Restare), is a political party active in Sicily and led by Ismaele La Vardera. The movement presents itself as a civic, regionalist and anti-establishment political force, advocating transparency, political renewal, and opposition to traditional party structures in Sicily.

== History ==
ControCorrente was officially launched in February 2025 in Palermo by Ismaele La Vardera, a member of the Sicilian Regional Assembly and former television journalist. The movement was created after La Vardera's split from South calls North (ScN), led by Cateno De Luca, due to disagreements over the party's political position. From its foundation, ControCorrente emphasized issues such as institutional transparency, the fight against corruption, environmental protection, healthcare reform, and support for young people and local communities. The movement gradually established local branches and thematic departments across Sicily.

In the 2026 Sicilian local elections, ControCorrente achieved its most significant electoral successes. Candidates supported by the movement won mayoral races in Agrigento, where Michele Sodano was elected mayor, and in Bronte, where Giuseppe Gullotta secured victory. These results represented the first major administrative victories for the movement and strengthened its presence in local government.

On 14 May 2026, Sonia Alfano, former Italian MEP, joined the party, while on 29 June 2026, two members of the Sicilian Regional Assembly, Carlo Gilistro and Josè Marano, left the Five Star Movement (M5S) to join CC. On the following day, Alessandro De Leo, from the Mixed Group, joined the party, thus an autonomous group was officially formed within the regional assembly.

On 30 July 2026, ControCorrente joined Civic Project Italy (PCI), a political movement founded by Alessandro Onorato, municipal councillor for major events, sport and tourism of Rome. At the same time, La Vardera was appointed president of the movement.
