= Ettore Romoli =

Italian politician (1938–2018)

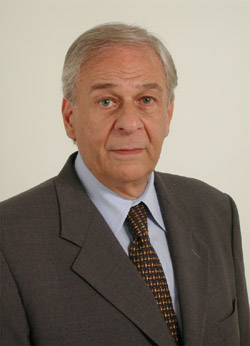

President of the Regional Council of Friuli-Venezia Giulia
- In office 22 May 2018 – 14 June 2018
- Preceded by: Franco Iacop
- Succeeded by: Piero Mauro Zanin

Mayor of Gorizia
- In office 29 May 2007 – 26 June 2017
- Preceded by: Vittorio Brancati
- Succeeded by: Rodolfo Ziberna

Member of the Chamber of Deputies
- In office 30 May 2001 – 27 April 2006

Member of the Senate
- In office 15 April 1994 – 8 May 1996

Personal details
- Born: 9 April 1938 Florence, Italy
- Died: 14 June 2018 (aged 80) Udine, Italy
- Party: Forza Italia
- Occupation: Politician

Ettore Romoli (9 April 1938 – 14 June 2018) was an Italian politician. He was a member of the Forza Italia party and was mayor of Gorizia from 2007 to 2017.

Political offices
Preceded by Vittorio Brancati	Mayor of Gorizia; 2007–2017	Succeeded by Rodolfo Ziberna
