= Massimo Federici =

Italian politician

President of the Province of La Spezia
- In office 14 October 2014 – 29 June 2017
- Preceded by: Marino Fiasella
- Succeeded by: Giorgio Cozzani

Mayor of La Spezia
- In office 27 May 2007 – 29 June 2017
- Preceded by: Giorgio Pagano
- Succeeded by: Pierluigi Peracchini

Personal details
- Born: 13 August 1956 (age 69)
- Party: Democratic Party
- Occupation: Civil servant

Massimo Federici (born 13 August 1956) is an Italian politician. He is member of the Democratic Party. He served as mayor of La Spezia from 2007 to 2017 and as president of the Province of La Spezia from 2014 to 2017.
