= Simone Petrangeli =

Italian politician and lawyer

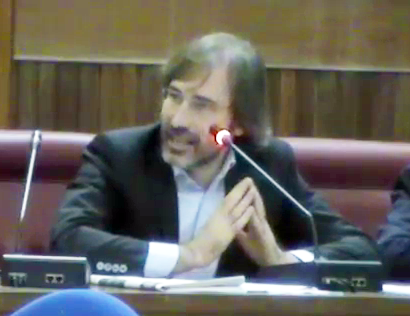
- Petrangeli in 2014
- Born: 8 June 1975 (age 51); Rome, Italy
- Occupations: Politician; Lawyer
- Political party: Left Ecology Freedom

Simone Petrangeli (born 8 June 1975) is an Italian politician and Lawyer. He is member of the Left Ecology Freedom.He was born in Rome, Italy. He has been the Mayor of Rieti from 2012 until 2017.

== Biography ==
He is the son of attorney Olinto Petrangeli, who served as president of the Cassa di Risparmio di Rieti from 1993 to 1998 and was a member of the steering committee and the board of directors of the Varrone Foundation, and who previously served as a city councilor and municipal commissioner for the Italian Socialist Party.

In 2001, he earned a law degree from “La Sapienza” University in Rome with a thesis on Animal migration and began practicing law.

From 2002 to 2012, he served as a city council member in Rieti, first for Communist Refoundation Party and then for Sinistra Ecologia Libertà, for which he became the provincial spokesperson. Since January 27, 2014, he has been a member of the National Assembly.

Political offices
Preceded by Giuseppe Emili	Mayor of Rieti; 2012–2017	Succeeded by Antonio Cicchetti
