= Federico Pizzarotti =

Italian politician (born 1973)

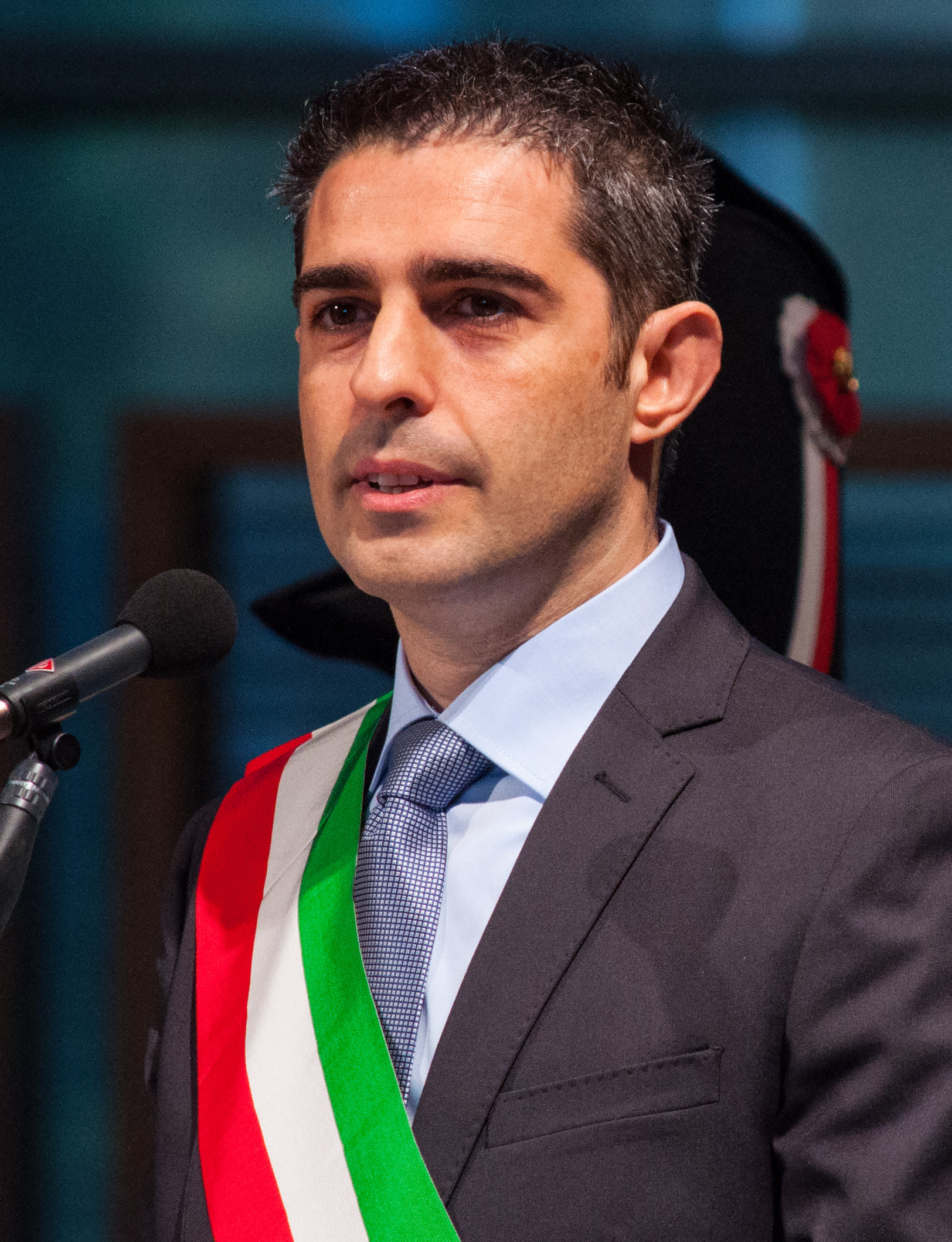
- Pizzarotti in 2013

Mayor of Parma
- In office 25 May 2012 – 1 July 2022
- Preceded by: Pietro Vignali
- Succeeded by: Michele Guerra

Personal details
- Born: 7 October 1973 (age 52) Parma, Italy
- Party: Az (since 2024)
- Other political affiliations: M5S (2009–2016); IiC (2018–2022); LCN (2022) +Eu (2022–2024)
- Spouse: Cinzia Piastri (since 2003)
- Occupation: Project manager, politician

Federico Pizzarotti (born 7 October 1973) is an Italian politician who served as mayor of Parma from 2012 to 2022. Elected mayor as a member of the Five Star Movement (Movimento Cinque Stelle, M5S), which he had first joined in 2009, he successfully ran for re-election in 2017 through a civic list, after dissent within the M5S. He was the first M5S mayor in a provincial capital of Italy, after being elected on 21 May 2012 with 60.22% of votes in a runoff election. He was re-elected with 57.87% of the votes.

In 2018, Pizzarotti founded his own party, Italy in Common (Italia in Comune, IiC). In 2022, he briefly joined the National Civic List (Lista Civica Nazionale, LCN) within Italy Is There (L'Italia c'è, LIC), before he left for More Europe (Più Europa, +Eu), where he was elected president in February 2023. In April 2024, he left +Eu due to dissent ahead of the 2024 European Parliament election, and joined the Action (Azione, Az) party led by Carlo Calenda.

== Early life and education ==
Born in Parma, in the Emilia-Romagna region, Pizzarotti graduated in electronics from the "Primo Levi" Professional Institute for Industry and Craftsmanship. He worked for many years as a consultant for banks and financial institutions. At the time of his election as mayor, he worked as a project manager at Credito Emiliano in Reggio Emilia in the information and communications technology sector.

== Career ==
=== Five Star Movement ===
Pizzarotti began his political career in 2009, joining the newly formed M5S of Beppe Grillo and Gianroberto Casaleggio. With the M5S, he ran as a regional councilor in the 2010 Emilia-Romagna regional election but was not elected. In 2012, Pizzarotti became the first M5S mayor in a provincial capital of Italy. In March 2012, he ran as the M5S candidate for the office of mayor of Parma in the 2012 Italian local elections, held between 6 and 7 May 2012, following the resignation of the centre-right coalition mayor Pietro Vignali and the administration of the city. In the first round, he obtained 19.47% of the votes and entered the runoff against the centre-left coalition candidate Vincenzo Bernazzoli, the then president of the province of Parma, who got 39.20% of the vote. On 21 May 2012, Pizzarotti became the mayor of Parma after he won the runoff with 60.22% of the votes. In November 2015, Pizzarotti was appointed by the ANCI as president of the Environmental Policies, Territory, Civil Protection, Energy and Waste Commission.

In October 2016, Pizzarotti left the M5S after years of tensions with the national leadership of the party that culminated in his suspension in February 2016. In his role as mayor, he had been among those investigated for abuse of office in an investigation into appointments at the Teatro Regio. The investigation was made public in May 2016. On 13 May 2016, for not having disclosed the opening of the investigation and for his refusal to send the legal documents via email to the sender Grillo's staff, since he said they were anonymous, Grillo's blog announced the suspension of Pizzarotti from the M5S, with the possibility of reply within ten days. On 23 May 2016, Pizzarotti, contesting the suspension, sent his counterarguments and was awaiting a response. On 16 September 2016, following the dismissal of the charges against him, he asked to be reinstated within the M5S; as he received no response, and with the new regulations that were modified during the suspension, Pizzarotti announced that he was leaving the M5S on 3 October 2016. Following his exit from the M5S, with the support of 18 out of the 19 councilors elected and who left the M5S with him, Pizzarotti founded the Parma Effect (Effetto Parma, EP) council group.

=== Parma Effect, Italy in Common, and National Civic List ===
After his departure from the M5S, Pizzarotti continued his mandate as an independent politician with the support of the city council group Parma Effect, which was composed of former M5S councillors who stood by their mayor. He ran for re-election through a civic list. On 25 June 2017, after gaining access to the runoff, Pizzarotti was confirmed mayor of Parma for a second term by running as an independent supported by his civic movement Parma Effect. He defeated the centre-left coalition candidate Paolo Scarpa with 57.87% of the votes. On 15 April 2018, Pizzarotti founded IiC as his political movement, calling itself the Mayors' Party. It ran in support of the centre-left coalition candidates in the 2019 Italian regional elections, such as in Abruzzo, Sardinia, and Piedmont, which were won the by the centre-right coalition; apart from Piedmont, where it obtained 0.58% of the votes, it elected at least a councilor. The Abruzzo in Common movement, which was aligned in support of the centre-left candidate Giovanni Legnini, obtained 3.89% of the votes and elected a councillor. The Sardinia in Common list, which was made up of Italia in the Municipality of Sardegna, Possible, Laura Boldrini's Futura, and Radicales Sardos, supported the centre-left coalition candidate Massimo Zedda; it garnered 2.5% of the votes and elected a councilor.

In the run-up to 2019 European Parliament election in Italy, Pizzarotti decided to run for Member of the European Parliament (MEP) within a joint list of IiC, +Eu, and other minor parties. Initially, IiC had allied itself with the Federation of the Greens, before it decided to ally with +Eu. Pizzarotti was a candidate in the North-East Italy constituency for +Eu; he came second with 22,127 preferences but was not elected as the list did not exceed the minimum access threshold. In 2022, at the end of his second term as mayor, he and Parma Effect supported the candidacy for mayor of his technical councilor for culture Michele Guerra, also supported by the centre-left coalition, who was elected as the new mayor. Ahead of the 2022 Italian general election, Pizzarotti launched the LCN, a formation of centre-left coalition administrators that also included LIC, a political association founded by the Italia Viva (IV) deputy Gianfranco Librandi and former +Eu deputy secretary Piercamillo Falasca. Pizzarotti's new political party did not need to collect signatures for the 22 September 2022 general election thanks to Matteo Renzi's party, whose group in the Chamber of Deputies changes its name on 1 August 2022 to Italia Viva − Italia C'è. On 7 August 2022, Pizzarotti announced the alliance between the LCN and IV, which was ended on 22 August 2022 following disagreements over the composition of the electoral lists. Pizzarotti would have been candidate in third position in the multi-member constituency Emilia-Romagna 2 behind Calenda and Lisa Noja.

=== More Europe and Action ===
In November 2022, Pizzarotti announced his membership in +Eu and at the same time his presidential candidacy for the next congress to determine Benedetto Della Vedova's successor at the helm of the party. In February 2023, he opposed the decision of the then current leaders, headed by Emma Bonino, to register the party brand in their name on 20 February 2022. It was later clarified that this did not happen and was only a precautionary initiative. During the third +Eu congress on 26 February 2023, Pizzarotti was elected president of the party with 203 votes, succeeding Riccardo Magi, who was elected the party's secretary.

Following Magi's and +Eu's decision to join the United States of Europe list with Renzi's IV ahead of the 2024 European Parliament election in Italy, which Pizzarotti did not share, he left the party on 10 April 2024. He cited as reasons for his exit the alliance with Salvatore Cuffaro and his candidates, such as Cuffaro's brother-in-law Marco Zambuto, as well as Clemente Mastella's wife Sandra Lonardo, and Armando Cesaro, the son of Forza Italia (FI) politician Luigi Cesaro and former FI group leader in the Regional Council of Campania who was appointed head of IV's local authorities. He described them as "not very [pro-]'European' and very distant from our way of doing politics and our original mission". Pizzarotti entered Az, Calenda's party, and was joined by Falasca. Pizzarotti was announced as the 2024 European Parliament candidate for Az's list We Are Europeans in the North-East Italy constituency.

== Personal life ==
Pizzarotti's passions include information technology, theatre, and judo. He has been married to Cinzia Piastri since 2003.

== Works ==
- Incerti, Matteo; Pizzarotti, Federico (2012). Cittadini a 5 stelle. La partecipazione in rete che vince sui partiti (in Italian). Reggio Emilia: Aliberti Editore. ISBN 88-74-24951-9.
- Pizzarotti, Federico; Serafini, Marta (2013). Il primo cittadino (in Italian). Turin: ADD Editore. ISBN 88-67-83060-0.
- Frigeri, Marcello; Pizzarotti, Federico (2016). Una rivoluzione normale (in Italian). Milan: Mondadori. ISBN 88-91-81016-9.
- Frigeri, Marcello; Pizzarotti, Federico (2019). Il meglio deve ancora venire (in Italian). Milan: Piemme. ISBN 978-88-566-7311-1.
