= Mario Lucini =

Italian politician

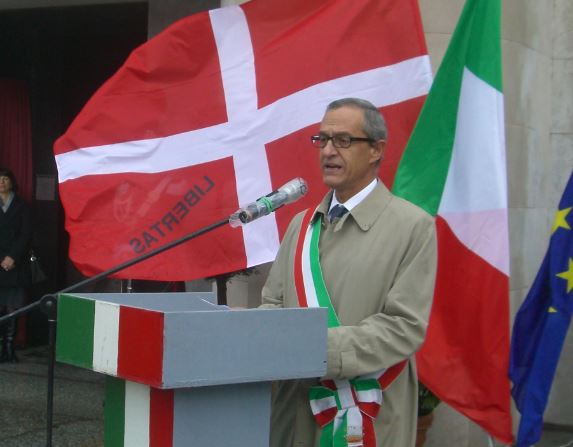
- Born: 18 September 1958 (age 67)
- Occupation: Politician
- Political party: Democratic Party

Mario Lucini (born 18 September 1958) is an Italian politician. He is member of the Democratic Party. He is a geologist by trade and was the mayor of Como, Lombardy from 21 May 2012 to 27 June 2017.

== Biography ==
A Geologist by profession, he has been married to Lorella Ostinelli since 1984, with whom he has three children.

In 2002, he was elected to the Como City Council for La Margherita, becoming its leader. He was re-elected to the council in 2007, elected on the Ulivo list, and in 2010 became leader of the Democratic Party (Italy).

In 2011, he ran in the Centre-left politics primary elections for the selection of the mayoral candidate and, winning on November 27 with 49.4% of the vote, secured the nomination.

He therefore stood in the 2012 local elections as leader of a coalition formed by the Democratic Party (Italy), Paco-Sel, Italia dei Valori, Como Civica and Amo la mia città, two civic lists, finishing in the lead in the first round on May 6 and 7 with 35.5% of the votes. In the runoff two weeks later, against The People of Freedom candidate Laura Bordoli, he was elected mayor with 74.9% of the vote.

His victory marked the first election of a center-left representative as mayor of Como since direct elections for mayor were introduced.

In the investigation by the Como Public Prosecutor's Office into public contracts and flood barriers along the lakefront, he is under investigation for interference with the freedom to choose a contractor and for ideological falsehood.

As previously stated, he has decided not to run for a second term in the 2017 local elections.
