= Aetius =

Aetius, Aëtius, or Aetios (Ἀέτιος) may refer to:

== People ==
- Aetius (philosopher), 1st- or 2nd-century doxographer and Eclectic philosopher
- Aëtius of Antioch, 4th-century Anomean theologian
- Flavius Aetius (died 454), Western Roman commander in chief who fought Attila the Hun in Gaul
- Flavius Aetius (consul 454), Eastern Roman consul who the Huns on the Danube
- Aetius (praetorian prefect), fl. 419–425, praefectus urbi of Constantinople and Praetorian prefect of the East
- Aëtius of Amida, 6th-century Byzantine physician
- Sicamus Aëtius, Byzantine medical writer possibly identical with the preceding
- Aetios (eunuch), early 9th century Byzantine official and general
- Aetios (general) (died 845), Byzantine general at the Sack of Amorium and one of the 42 Martyrs of Amorium
- Aëtius (bishop), 3rd century AD Arian bishop
- Aeci (Aetius), bishop of Barcelona (995–1010)

== Other uses ==
- Aetius (spider), a genus of spiders

== See also ==
- Ezio (disambiguation), the Italian form
- Aécio, the Portuguese form
