= Aristarchus =

Aristarchus may refer to:

== People ==
- Aristarchus of Tegea (5th century BC), Greek writer
- Aristarchus of Athens, (5th century BC), one of the leaders of the Athenian coup of 411 BC
- Aristarchus of Athens, though apparently different from the above, a conversation between whom and Socrates is recorded by Xenophon in his Memorabilia (2.7.)
- Aristarchus of Sparta, harmost of Byzantium in 400 BC
- Aristarchus (physician), royal physician to the court of Syria in the 3rd century BC
- Aristarchus of Samos (c. 310–230 BC), Greek astronomer and mathematician
- Aristarchus of Samothrace (c. 220–143 BC), Greek grammarian
- Aristarchus, one of the ambassadors sent by the Phocaeans to Seleucus IV Philopator, the son of Antiochus III the Great, in 190 BC
- Aristarchus of Colchis (fl. 63–50 BC), Colchian dynast, appointed by Pompey after the close of the Mithridatic Wars
- Aristarchus of Thessalonica (1st century AD), Eastern saint and early Christian mentioned in a few passages in the New Testament
- Aristarchus the Chronographer, author of a letter on the situation of Athens, and the events which took place there in the 1st century AD, and especially of the life of Dionysius the Areopagite
- Aristarchus of Alexandria (date unknown), the author of a work on the interpretation of dreams, mentioned by Artemidorus in the 2nd century

== Other ==
- 3999 Aristarchus, a main-belt asteroid
- Aristarchus (crater), on the Moon

== See also ==
- Aristarchos 2.3 m Telescope Project
