= Ezio =

Ezio is an Italian masculine name, originating from the Latin name Aetius.

It may refer to:

- Flavius Aetius (c. 396–454), Roman general, after whom Metastasio's libretto and all the operas below are named.
  - Ezio (libretto), opera libretto by Metastasio. Notable settings are:
    - Ezio (Handel), King's Theatre, London 1732
    - Ezio (Mysliveček, 1775), Naples
    - Ezio (Mysliveček, 1777), Munich – completely new music
    - Ezio (Gluck), Prague 1750, revised Vienna 1763
    - Ezio (Traetta) by Tommaso Traetta, Teatro delle Dame, Rome, 1757
    - Ezio (Latilla), Naples 1758
- Ezio (band), a band from Cambridge, England
- Ezio Gamba (born 1958), an Italian judoka
- Ezio Leonardi (1929–2025), an Italian politician
- Ezio Mauro (born 1948), an Italian journalist
- Ézio (footballer) (1966–2011), Ézio Leal Moraes Filho, Brazilian footballer
- Ezio Pinza (1892–1957), Italian opera singer
- Ezio Riboldi (1878–1965), Italian politician
- Ezio Todini (born 1943), Italian academic, hydrologist and civil engineer
- Ezio Touray (born 2004), Italian footballer
- Ezio Vanoni (1903–1956), Italian economist and politician
- Ezio Vigorelli (1892–1964), Italian lawyer and politician

== Fictional characters ==
- Ezio Auditore da Firenze, the protagonist of Ubisoft's Assassin's Creed II, Assassin's Creed Brotherhood and Assassin's Creed Revelations

== See also ==
- Ezio (security), a security solution range for online banking and shopping from Gemalto
- EZ-IO, an intraosseous infusion drill by Vidacare
- Ezio (Flavius Aetius), character from Verdi's Attila (opera)
