= Venous cutdown =

Emergency medical procedure

- ICD-9-CM: 38.94
- MeSH: D016748

Venous cutdown is an emergency procedure in which the vein is exposed surgically and then a cannula is inserted into the vein under direct vision. It is used for venous access in cases of trauma, and hypovolemic shock when the use of a peripheral venous catheter is either difficult or impossible. The great saphenous vein is most commonly used. This procedure has fallen out of favor with the development of safer techniques for central venous catheterization such as the Seldinger technique, the modified Seldinger technique, intraosseous infusion, as well as the use of ultrasound guidance for placement of central venous catheters without using the cutdown technique.

== Procedure ==
The skin is cleaned, draped, and anesthetized if time allows. The greater saphenous vein is identified on the surface above the medial malleolus, a full-thickness transverse skin incision is made, and 2 cm of the vein is freed from the surrounding structures. The vessel is tied closed distally, the proximal portion is sliced open (venotomy) and gently dilated, and a cannula is introduced through the venotomy and secured in place with a more proximal ligature around the vein and cannula. An intravenous line is connected to the cannula to complete the procedure.

== Complications ==
Complications of venous cutdown include cellulitis, hematoma, phlebitis, perforation of the posterior wall of the vein, venous thrombosis and nerve and arterial transection. This procedure can result in damage to the saphenous nerve due to its intimate path with the great saphenous vein, resulting in loss of cutaneous sensation in the medial leg. Over the years, the venous cutdown procedure has become outdated by the introduction and recent prehospital developments of intraosseous infusion in trauma/hypovolemic shock patients.

== General and cited references ==
- McIntosh B, Dulchavsky S (1992). "Peripheral vascular cutdown". Crit Care Clin. 8 (4): 807–18. doi:10.1016/S0749-0704(18)30226-4. PMID 1393752.
