= Kyriacos A. Athanasiou =

Cypriot-American bioengineer (born 1960)

Kyriacos A. Athanasiou (Greek: Κυριάκος Αθανασίου; born 1960) is a Greek Cypriot-American bioengineer who has contributed significantly to both academic advancements as well as high-technology industries. He is currently a distinguished professor at the University of California, Irvine. He joined UCI from the University of California, Davis where he also served as the chair of the biomedical engineering department. Before joining the University of California in 2009, he was the Karl F. Hasselmann Professor at Rice University. He has published hundreds of scientific articles detailing structure-function relationships and tissue engineering approaches for articular cartilage, the knee meniscus, and the temporomandibular joint.

== Early life and education ==
Athanasiou was born in Larnaca, Cyprus in 1960. He went to Sotir Elementary School and St. George High School. In 1978, he graduated valedictorian from high school and then joined the army for 26 months as part of his mandatory military duty. During that time, he trained at an infantry cadet school eventually becoming a second lieutenant. In August 1980, he came to the United States to attend college. He spent his first year at Brescia College in Owensboro, Kentucky. He then moved in with relatives in Long Island, New York.

Athanasiou received his bachelor's degree in Mechanical Engineering from New York Institute of Technology at Old Westbury in 1984. He then attended Columbia University where he obtained his master's degree in 1985, his Ph.M in 1987, and his Ph.D in 1989.

== Research ==
Upon obtaining his Ph.D. in early 1989, Athanasiou became an assistant professor at the University of Texas Health Science Center at San Antonio. He became an associate professor in 1994. He was recruited to Rice University as a full professor of bioengineering at the end of 1999. Athanasiou established a research group in bioengineering, specializing in the cartilages of the musculoskeletal system. His group has worked extensively on cartilages of the musculoskeletal system both in terms of characterization but also in efforts to achieve healing or repair of the clinically complex problems of cartilage afflictions, including trauma and osteoarthritis.

Athanasiou and his colleagues published the book Articular Cartilage. He published one of the first papers on the use of biodegradable scaffolds as carriers of growth factors to heal cartilage defects in vivo. His group has directed its attention to tissue engineering the jaw joint disc (TMJ disc) and the knee meniscus, whose degradation is responsible for a large number of debilitating problems. (TMJ disc degeneration and meniscus injuries result in arthritic-like diseases that strike otherwise healthy young adults.) In addition to tissue-level work, Athanasiou has established a program to understand how single cartilage cells behave under direct and controlled biomechanical loads, not only in terms of deformation but also in terms of changes in gene expression. This work represents the first measurement of gene levels at the single cell level under varying biomechanical conditions. His group has also demonstrated the fabrication of entire sections of articular cartilage by self-assembly of cells, without the use of any scaffolds. Their group also demonstrated that hydrostatic pressure in conjunction with growth factors can have synergistic effects on the functional properties of engineered cartilage. The biomechanical, histological, transcriptional, and biochemical properties of this engineered cartilage approach those of native articular cartilage. More recently, the Athanasiou group showed the engineering of articular cartilage with biomechanical tensile properties on par with native tissue; the work was published in Nature Materials. In a study published in the Proceedings of the National Academy of Sciences Athanasiou showed that the matrix of a number of musculoskeletal tissues can be crosslinked with exogenous methods using lysyl oxidase L2. In a paper published in Science, the Athanasiou group described why cartilage healing is so difficult.

== High-technology companies ==
In addition to his academic accomplishments, Athanasiou is known for his significant contributions in co-founding fifteen companies based on technologies co-developed by his group. His first company Osteobiologics, founded in 1993, was based, among other inventions, on the development of acellular scaffolds for the treatment of focal cartilage lesions. This was the first ever implant for this application. The company was acquired by Smith & Nephew in 2006. Another company co-founded by Athanasiou is Vidacare based on Athanasiou et al.'s patents on intraosseous infusion; this company was acquired by Teleflex Medical in 2013.

== Service to the biomedical engineering profession ==
In the summer of 2002, Athanasiou was elected President of the Biomedical Engineering Society. He served as BMES President from 2003 through 2004. He has also served as editor-in-chief of the Society's flagship journal, the Annals of Biomedical Engineering.

== Honors ==
Among other awards and recognitions, Athanasiou has been elected to the National Academy of Engineering, National Academy of Medicine, American Academy of Arts and Sciences, and the National Academy of Inventors. He is a Fellow of the American Association for the Advancement of Science, the American Society of Mechanical Engineers, and the Biomedical Engineering Society. In 2023 he became a Great Immigrants Award Honoree; the award was given by the Carnegie Corporation of New York.
