= Venous access =

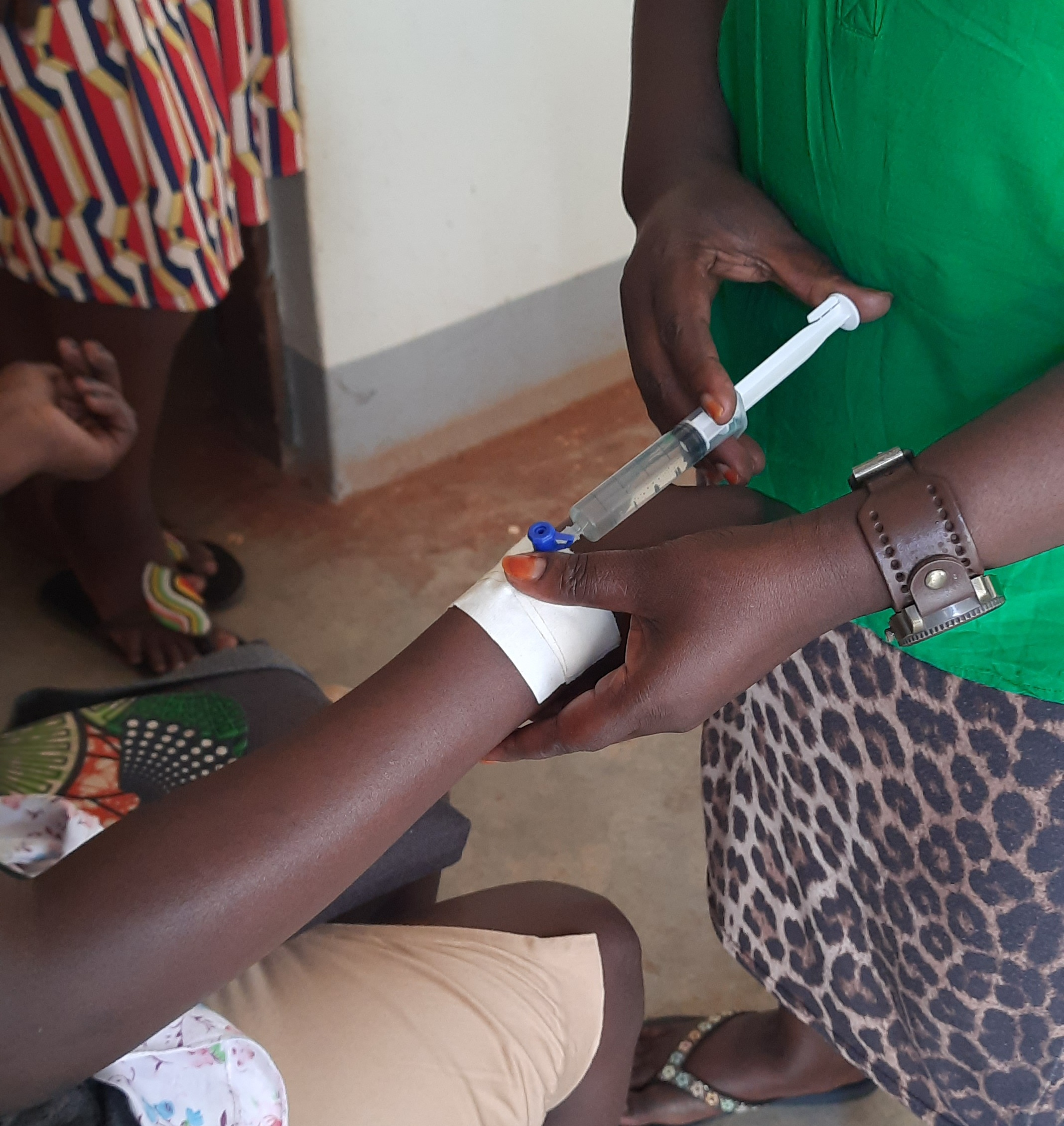
- Application of intravenous medication through a peripheral venous access

Venous access is any method used to access the bloodstream through the veins, either to administer intravenous therapy (e.g. medication, fluid), parenteral nutrition, to obtain blood for analysis, or to provide an access point for blood-based treatments such as dialysis or apheresis. Access is most commonly achieved via the Seldinger technique, and guidance tools such as ultrasound and fluoroscopy can also be used to assist with visualizing access placement.

== Methods ==
=== Peripheral ===
The most common form of venous access is a peripheral venous cannula which is generally inserted into veins of the hands, forearms, and occasionally feet. Healthcare providers may use a number of different techniques in order to improve the chances of successful access. Some techniques include using a tourniquet, tapping over the vein, warming the area to dilate the vein, or using an ultrasound to directly visualize the target vein. Near-infrared illumination devices can also be used to help identify superficial veins that are not easily felt or seen with the naked eye. These devices emit infrared light which is absorbed by hemoglobin in the blood, allowing for easier visualization of the vasculature.

Peripheral access is usually indicated when short-term access up to 7 days is needed. Complication rates from these peripheral access points increase quickly the longer they remain in place (such as inflammation of the veins), and thus are routinely removed and replaced every 3–4 days if possible.

=== Central ===
In some situations, venous access is obtained by inserting catheters into the large central veins of the trunk of the body such as the internal jugular, subclavian, or femoral veins. This type of venous access is performed with central venous catheters (CVCs), and is required in certain situations where peripheral access is inadequate. Such situations include, but are not limited to, the need for long-term venous access (for weeks or months, not days), administering of medications that can damage smaller veins (e.g. chemotherapy), measuring central venous pressure, obtaining certain blood tests (specifically central venous oxygen saturation), or performing dialysis. Types of CVCs include non-tunneled and tunneled catheters, peripherally inserted central catheter (PICC lines), and implanted ports.

=== Midline ===
Midline access is a type of peripheral venous access inserted into peripheral veins and that extends further than standard peripheral catheters but does not yet reach the large central veins of the thorax. They are used when intermediate-term access (one month) is needed or when administering medications that are highly irritating to smaller veins. However, their use is declining in favor of PICC lines which have the added benefit of more central access and longer potential dwell-times.

== In children ==
In children, the most common form of venous access is also peripheral access although the dwell time in children are much shorter than in adults, 1–4 days. Accessing veins in the legs in children can promote immobilization, but is used if there are no other way. In neonates, scalp veins can also be used if other peripheral veins are not accessible. Umbilical veins are also an option in neonates, but is per definition a central access.

When accessing veins in children, certain other factors are considered such as their smaller caliber veins and anatomical variations. Gaining venous access in children can thus present a number of different challenges than in adults. For example, certain antiseptic cleaners are avoided because they may irritate the skin of young children. Children also have thinner connective tissues than adults and thus some techniques used to illuminate veins may have a risk of causing burns.

== Complications ==
Most common complications with venous access are catheter related infections, thrombophlebitis and venous thrombosis. If having thrombophlebitis or thrombosis; pain when using the access is another complication. Peripheral venous access is least prone to thrombosis, followed by midline catheters and the centrally placed catheters. Central venous access is the most common reason for venous thrombosis in children.

=== Thrombosis and blockage ===
Long term central venous catheters for dialysis and apheresis are often locked (injection of a limited volume of liquid to prevent malfunctioning when catheter is not in use) with high concentration heparin (5000 units per ml) to prevent catheter malfunctioning due to clot formation. Besides, flushing of catheters using normal saline before and after administration of medications, parenteral nutrition, blood components, contrast media, fluids, and blood sampling reduces the likelihood of catheter blockage in the future.

== Emergency situations ==
In emergency situations when peripheral access cannot be easily achieved, such as in arrest scenarios, intraosseous methods can be used to gain rapid access to the venous system. These methods usually involve inserting an access device into the tibia or femur bones in the legs, humerus in the upper arm, or sometimes the sternum in the chest.

Venous cutdown can also be done to gain immediate emergency access to the venous system. Venous cutdown procedures most commonly target the great saphenous vein in the leg because it is superficial, easily accessible, and consistently in the same anatomical location. This procedure is used in certain populations such as critically ill patients or patients in hypovolemic shock or when less invasive methods such as peripheral catheters or CVCs have failed. However, in many cases the use of intraosseous access has replaced the need for venous cutdown procedures.
