= Nileus (physician) =

Ancient Greek physician

Nileus (Ancient Greek: Νείλευς) or Nilus (Νεῖλος) or Neleus (Νήλευς), although most correct form of the word seems to be the Νείλευς, was an ancient Greek physician. He most probably lived some time in or before the 3rd century BC.

He is mentioned and quoted by many other Greek writers and physicians like the Heracleides of Tarentum, Celsus, Caelius Aurelianus, Galen, Alexander Trallianus, Oribasius, Aetius and Paulus Aegineta.

He invented a machine for the reduction of dislocations which was called πλινθίον and a detailed description of it is given by Oribasius. He was also known for a medicine which was called the malagma of Nileus.
