= Dario Allevi =

Italian politician

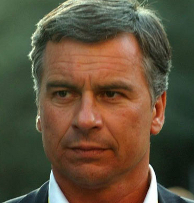

Mayor of Monza
- In office 26 June 2017 – 28 June 2022
- Preceded by: Roberto Scanagatti
- Succeeded by: Paolo Pilotto

President of the Province of Monza and Brianza
- In office 8 June 2009 – 13 October 2014
- Preceded by: Office established
- Succeeded by: Pietro Luigi Ponti

Personal details
- Born: 30 September 1965 (age 60) Rome, Lazio, Italy
- Party: MSI (to 1995); AN (1995-2009); PdL (2009-2013); FI (2013-2023); FdI (since 2023)

Dario Allevi (born 30 September 1965) is an Italian politician.

He is a member of the far-right party Brothers of Italy. He served as first president of the Province of Monza and Brianza from 2009 to 2014. Allevi was elected mayor of Monza on 12 June 2017 and took office on 26 June, holding office until 28 June 2022.

== Biography ==
Born in Rome, he moved with his family to Monza, where he attended middle school and the Paolo Frisi Scientific High School. He completed his mandatory military service in the Firefighter.

In 1987, he began working in the financial sector, first as a broker at a brokerage firm and later as a trader at a bank.

== See also ==
- 2017 Italian local elections
- List of mayors of Monza

Political offices
| Preceded by Office established | President of the Province of Monza and Brianza; 2009–2014 | Succeeded by Pietro Luigi Ponti |
