= Cleander of Sparta =

Military leader of Byzantium in 400 BC

Cleander of Sparta (Greek: Κλέανδρος) was harmost of Byzantium in 400 BC, and promised Cheirisophus to meet the Ten Thousand at Calpe with ships to convey them to Europe. However, when they reached Calpe, Cleander had not come. Nor had he sent any ships. Later, when he did arrive, he brought only two triremes and no transports.

Soon after his arrival, a tumult occurred, in which the traitor Dexippus was roughly handled. At Dexippus' instigation, Cleander threatened to sail away, to denounce Xenophon's army as enemies, and to issue orders that no Greek city should receive them. However, Xenophon and the army's leaders succeeded in pacifying Cleander and as a result Cleander offered hospitality to Xenophon and accepted the offer of leading the army home.

However, Cleander most likely wished to avoid the possibility of any hostile confrontation with the Persian satrap of Phrygia, Pharnabazus. So when the sacrifices for the projected march were declared to be unfavourable, Cleander sailed back to Byzantium, promising to give the army the best reception in his power on their arrival there. Cleander seemed to have kept this promise to the extent permitted given the opposition of the Spartan admiral Anaxibius. Cleander was succeeded as harmost of Byzantium by Aristarchus of Sparta.
