= Roberto Scanagatti =

Italian politician

Mayor of Monza
- In office 22 May 2012 – 26 June 2017
- Preceded by: Marco Mariani
- Succeeded by: Dario Allevi

Personal details
- Born: 20 June 1954 (age 71) Monza, Lombardy, Italy
- Party: Democratic Party of the Left (1992-1998); Democrats of the Left (1998-2007); Democratic Party (since 2007)
- Profession: administrator, entrepreneur

Roberto Scanagatti (born 20 June 1954 in Monza) is an Italian politician.

== Biography ==
=== Political career ===
He served as councillor in the City Council of Monza from 1992 to 1997. From 2002 to 2007 he has been both deputy mayor of Monza and Assessor to the Budget with mayor Francesco Faglia.

After the defeat of the centre-left coalition at the 2007 elections, Scanagatti was elected again in the City Council as the coalition leader of the Democratic Party. From 2011 to 2012 he was Assessor to the Finances in the municipality of Sesto San Giovanni.

He was elected Mayor of Monza with 63.4% of votes on 21 May 2012 and took office on 22 May 2012. He ran as Mayor for a second term at the 2017 Italian local elections, but he was defeated by the candidate of the centre-right coalition Dario Allevi.
