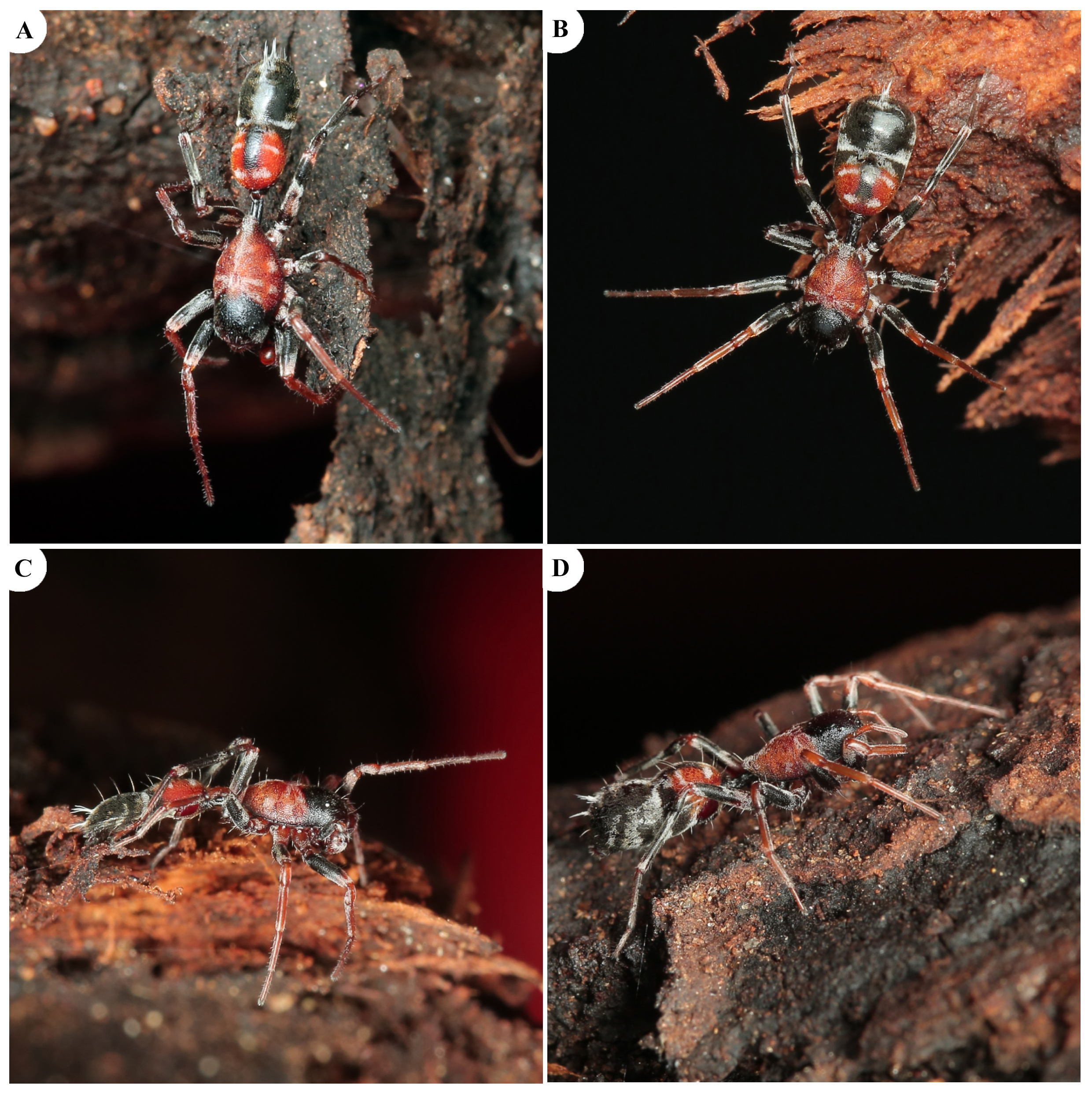

Scientific classification
- Kingdom: Animalia
- Phylum: Arthropoda
- Subphylum: Chelicerata
- Class: Arachnida
- Order: Araneae
- Infraorder: Araneomorphae
- Family: Corinnidae
- Genus: Aetius
- Species: A. decollatus

Binomial name
- Aetius decollatus O. Pickard-Cambridge, 1896

= Aetius decollatus =

Species of spider

Aetius decollatus, is a species of spider of the genus Aetius. It is native to India and Sri Lanka. In 2013, this species was discovered in India by a PhD scholar in Bombay for first time in the 117 years after the species was first found in Sri Lanka.
