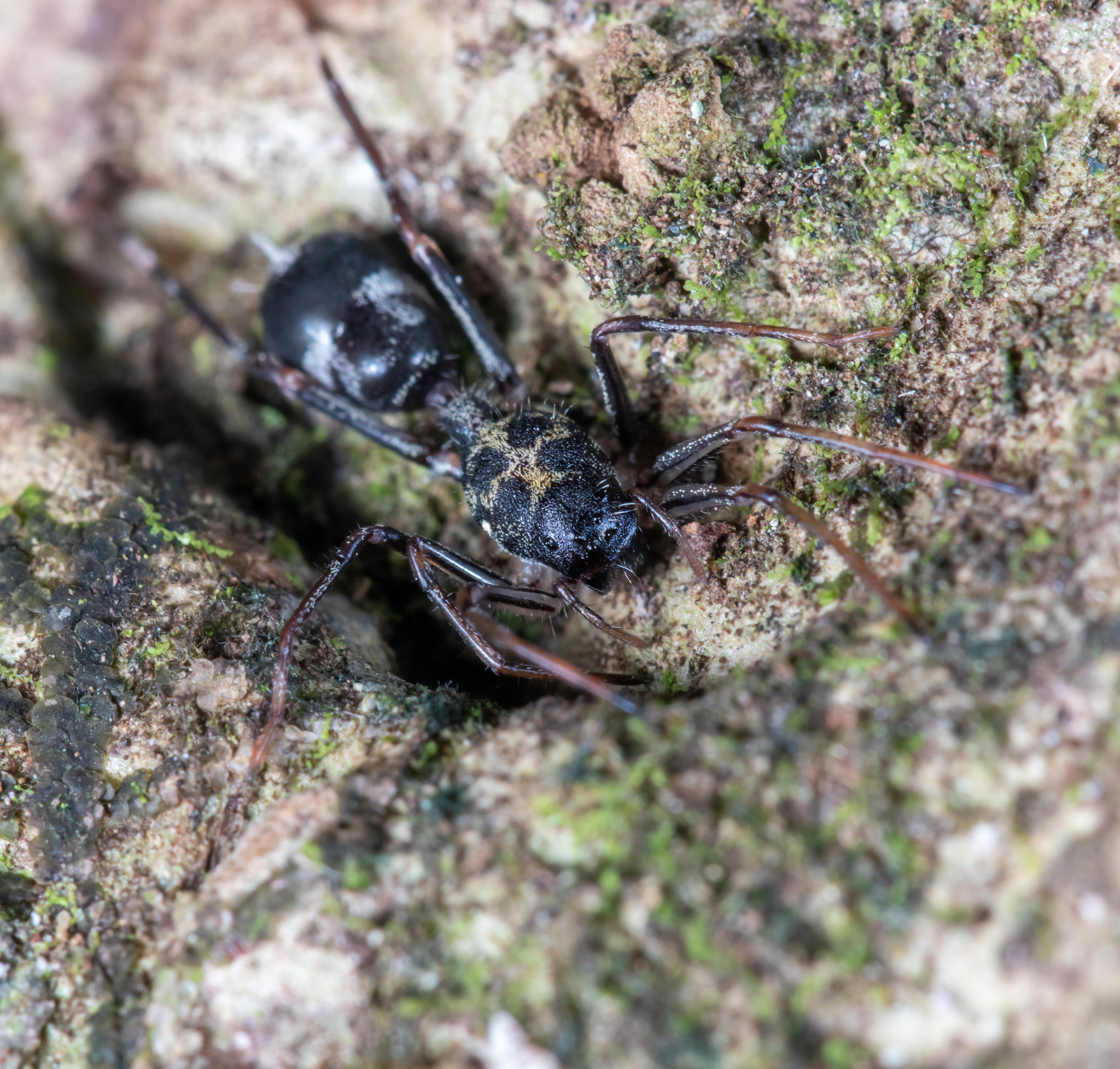
- from Indonesia

Scientific classification
- Kingdom: Animalia
- Phylum: Arthropoda
- Subphylum: Chelicerata
- Class: Arachnida
- Order: Araneae
- Infraorder: Araneomorphae
- Family: Corinnidae
- Genus: Aetius
- Species: A. nocturnus

Binomial name
- Aetius nocturnus Deeleman-Reinhold, 2001

= Aetius nocturnus =

Species of spider

Aetius nocturnus is a species of spider in the family Corinnidae (sac spiders). It was first described by Christa L. Deeleman-Reinhold in 2001.

== Taxonomy ==
The species was originally described from a female specimen collected in Thailand. The male was first described in 2013 by Dankittipakul & Singtripop.

== Distribution ==
A. nocturnus is distributed across Southeast Asia and southern China. It has been recorded from Thailand, Malaysia (Borneo), and China (Yunnan Province).

In China, the species has been found in several locations within Yunnan Province, including Xishuangbanna Daluo Forest Park, Mengyang Town, and Wild Elephant Valley, at elevations ranging from 592 to 800 meters.

== Description ==
Aetius nocturnus is a medium-sized spider. It can be distinguished from related species by several key characteristics: the stalk-like posterior projection on the carapace, the carapace surface covered with numerous hairs forming radiating striae, the slender embolus in males, thick copulatory ducts in females, and wide posterior spermathecae in females.

=== Male ===
Males have a total length of approximately 6.74 mm, with the carapace measuring 4.17 mm long and 2.56 mm wide. The carapace is black and sub-pentagonal in shape, with a distinctive stalk-like posterior projection. The surface is covered with numerous plumose hairs that form radiating striae patterns. The carapace is widest at the level of the second and third coxae and narrows posteriorly.

The legs are orange-red in color, with the retrolateral surfaces of the first and second femora, as well as the third and fourth femora, being black. The abdomen is black and oval-shaped with a medial constriction on the dorsal surface. It is covered with short plumose hairs and features a tuft of long white hairs at the posterior end. A large dorsal scutum nearly covers the entire abdomen.

=== Female ===
Females are slightly larger than males, with a total length of about 8.38 mm. The carapace measures 4.52 mm long and 2.70 mm wide. Females share similar coloration and structural features with males, though the abdomen is nearly round rather than oval. The legs are orange-red with black third and fourth femora.

The epigyne is simple and strongly sclerotised, with copulatory openings situated laterally in the posterior portion of the epigastric plate. The copulatory ducts are thick and connect to wide posterior spermathecae.
