= Aécio =

Aécio is a Portuguese name meaning "Aetius". Notable people with this name include:

- Aécio de Borba (1931–2021), Brazilian politician
- Aécio Ferreira da Cunha (1927–2010), Brazilian politician
- Aécio Neves (born 1960), Brazilian politician, 2014 presidential candidate
