= Roberto Invernizzi =

Italian politician (born 1970)

President of the Province of Monza and Brianza
- In office 28 September 2017 – 26 May 2019
- Preceded by: Pietro Luigi Ponti
- Succeeded by: Luca Santambrogio

Mayor of Bellusco
- In office 8 June 2009 – 27 May 2019
- Preceded by: Irene Maria Colombo
- Succeeded by: Mauro Colombo

Personal details
- Born: 16 February 1970 (age 56) Vimercate, Lombardy, Italy
- Party: Christian Democracy; Italian People's Party; Democratic Party

Roberto Invernizzi (born 16 February 1970) is an Italian politician who served as president of the Province of Monza and Brianza from 2017 to 2019 and as mayor of Bellusco from 2009 to 2019.

== Career ==
Invernizzi was first elected to the Bellusco municipal council in 1990 as a member of Christian Democracy. He subsequently joined the Italian People's Party and was continuously re-elected to the municipal council until 2009, serving several times as an assessor with executive responsibilities. In June 2009, he was elected mayor of Bellusco for the Democratic Party.

Invernizzi became acting president of the Province of Monza and Brianza in June 2017 following the end of Pietro Luigi Ponti's mandate. On 24 September 2017, he was elected president of the province, receiving 41,026 weighted votes against the centre-right opponent Riccardo Borgonovo, the mayor of Concorezzo.

Invernizzi's term as president of the province ended on 26 May 2019, when he ceased to be mayor of Bellusco following the 2019 municipal elections. He was succeeded on an interim basis by vice president Concettina Monguzzi until the election of Luca Santambrogio as president in July 2019.

From June 2019 to June 2024, he served as president of the municipal council of Bellusco.
