= Luca Santambrogio =

Italian politician (born 1975)

President of the Province of Monza and Brianza
- Incumbent
- Assumed office 27 July 2019
- Preceded by: Roberto Invernizzi

Mayor of Meda
- Incumbent
- Assumed office 27 June 2017
- Preceded by: Giovanni Giuseppe Caimi

Personal details
- Born: 5 October 1975 (age 50) Seregno, Lombardy, Italy
- Party: Lega Nord

Luca Santambrogio (born 5 October 1975) is an Italian politician of the Lega Nord. He has served as mayor of Meda since 2017 and as president of the Province of Monza and Brianza since 2019.

Santambrogio was elected mayor of Meda in the 2017 Italian local elections, defeating incumbent mayor Giovanni Giuseppe Caimi in the run-off with 55.71% of the vote.

In July 2019, Santambrogio was elected president of the Province of Monza and Brianza, defeating Concettina Monguzzi, the mayor of Lissone. Running with the support of the centre-right, he received 41,291 weighted votes, corresponding to 51.14% of the total. He was re-elected in March 2024, defeating Gianpiero Bocca, the mayor of Cesano Maderno, with 46,479 weighted votes (50.19%).
