= Aristarchus (physician) =

Aristarchus (Ancient Greek: Ἀρίσταρχος) was the name of at least two people of classical antiquity known to be physicians:

- Aristarchus, a Greek physician, of whom no particulars are known, except that he was attached to the court of Berenice, the wife of Antiochus II Theos, king of Syria, around 261-246 BC, and persuaded her to entrust herself to the hands of her enemy Laodice I after Antiochus's death. This unfortunately ended in the execution of Berenice and her infant son.
- Aristarchus, another physician of obscure history, whose medical prescriptions are quoted by later and more renowned writers such as Galen and Sicamus Aëtius. He appears to have been a native of Tarsus in Cilicia.
