= List of presidents of the Province of Monza and Brianza =

President of the Province of Monza and Brianza
- Presidente della Provincia di Monza e della Brianza
- Incumbent; Luca Santambrogio since 27 July 2019
- Term length: 4 years
- Inaugural holder: Dario Allevi
- Formation: 2009

The president of the Province of Monza and Brianza is the head of the provincial government in Monza and Brianza, Lombardy, Italy. The president oversees the administration of the province, coordinates the activities of the municipalities, and represents the province in regional and national matters.

Since July 2019, the office has been held by Luca Santambrogio of Lega Nord.

== History ==
The Province of Monza and Brianza was established in 2004, after being separated from the Province of Milan. In its initial phase, the new province was administered by a government-appointed extraordinary commissioner, Luigi Piscopo, pending the organisation of its institutional bodies. Following the 2009 elections, Dario Allevi took office as the first president of the province, marking the beginning of the province's ordinary democratic administration. The president was directly elected by the citizens for a five-year term and was responsible for appointing and dismissing the members of the Provincial Executive.

Following the 2014 Delrio Law, the president is elected by an assembly composed of the mayors and municipal councillors of the municipalities within the province. The president serves a four-year term and acts as the legal representative of the province, presiding over the Provincial Council and the Provincial Assembly of Mayors.

== List ==
No.	Portrait	Name	Term of office		Party	Election
No.	Portrait	Name	Start	End	Party	Election
–		Luigi Piscopo (Special Commissioner)	7 December 2004	8 June 2009	—	—
1		Dario Allevi	8 June 2009	13 October 2014	The People of Freedom	2009
2		Pietro Luigi Ponti	13 October 2014	26 June 2017	Democratic Party	2014
–		Roberto Invernizzi	26 June 2017	28 September 2017	Democratic Party	2014
3		Roberto Invernizzi	28 September 2017	26 May 2019	Democratic Party	2017
–		Concetta Monguzzi (Acting)	26 May 2019	27 July 2019	Democratic Party	2017
4		Luca Santambrogio	27 July 2019	4 March 2024	Lega Nord	2019
4		Luca Santambrogio	4 March 2024	Incumbent	Lega Nord	2024

== Sources ==
- "Storia amministrativa dell'ente". Ministero dell'Interno.
