= Ezio Riboldi =

Italian politician

Member of the Chamber of Deputies
- In office 1919–1926

Mayor of Monza
- In office 1914–1917

Personal details
- Born: 28 August 1878 Vimercate, Kingdom of Italy
- Died: 27 January 1965 (aged 86) Monza, Lombardy, Italy
- Party: Italian Socialist Party; Italian Communist Party
- Education: University of Milan
- Profession: Lawyer, teacher

Ezio Riboldi (28 August 1878 – 27 January 1965) was an Italian politician who served as a Deputy of the Kingdom of Italy for three legislatures and Mayor of Monza from 1914 to 1917.

== Bibliography ==
- Francesco Luigi Ferrari, ed. (1986). Lettere e documenti inediti. Vol. 1. Rome: Edizioni di Storia della Letteratura. pp. 104–105.
