= Pietro Luigi Ponti =

Italian politician (born 1959)

Member of the Regional Council of Lombardy
- Incumbent
- Assumed office 26 March 2018

President of the Province of Monza and Brianza
- In office 13 October 2014 – 26 June 2017
- Preceded by: Dario Allevi
- Succeeded by: Roberto Invernizzi

Mayor of Cesano Maderno
- In office 9 May 2012 – 26 June 2017
- Preceded by: Marina Romanò
- Succeeded by: Maurilio Ildefonso Longhin
- In office 1 August 1990 – 14 June 2004
- Preceded by: Annibale Sivelli
- Succeeded by: Paolo Vaghi

Personal details
- Born: 26 April 1959 (age 67) Cesano Maderno, Province of Milan, Italy
- Party: Democratic Party

Pietro Luigi Ponti (born 26 April 1959), also known as Gigi Ponti, is an Italian politician of the Democratic Party who has served as a member of the Regional Council of Lombardy since 2018. He previously served as president of the Province of Monza and Brianza from 2014 to 2017 and as mayor of Cesano Maderno for four terms, from 1990 to 2004 and from 2012 to 2017.

== Life and career ==
Born in 1959 in Cesano Maderno, Ponti started working as an employee of the railway company Ferrovienord in 1988.

Ponti began his political career in 1985, when he was elected to the municipal council. He initially joined Christian Democracy and later became a member of the Italian People's Party. He was elected mayor of Cesano Maderno in 1990 and was re-elected in 1995 and 1999. In 2004 he was elected to the Provincial Council of Milan and subsequently appointed provincial assessor with responsibility for the establishment of the Province of Monza and Brianza.

He was elected to the new Provincial Council of Monza and Brianza in 2009 and served as leader of the Democratic Party group until May 2012, when he was again elected mayor of Cesano Maderno.

In October 2014, Ponti was elected president of the Province of Monza and Brianza with 51,850 weighted votes (63.2%), becoming the first president elected under the province's new electoral system after the Delrio reform. His term as president ended in June 2017, and was succeeded as acting president by his deputy Roberto Invernizzi.

In the 2018 Lombard regional election, Ponti was elected to the Regional Council of Lombardy as a Democratic Party representative for the Monza and Brianza constituency, receiving 4,465 preference votes. He was re-elected to the Regional Council in the 2023 regional election.
