= Vidacare Corporation =

American medical device company

- Type: Private company
- Industry: Medical Equipment
- Founded: 2005
- Defunct: December 2, 2013
- Fate: Acquired
- Successor: Teleflex, Inc.
- Headquarters: Shavano Park, TX

Vidacare Corporation was the developer of intraosseous (inside the bone) medical devices. Its devices were used in vascular access, emergency and disaster medicine, oncology, and spinal surgery. Privately held, the company was established in 2001 and based in San Antonio, Texas.

In December 2013, Teleflex Incorporated, based in Wayne, Pennsylvania, acquired Vidacare Corporation for $263 million.

== History ==
The intraosseous space was first discovered as a non-collapsible vein in 1922 when C.K. Drinker, MD, of Harvard University examined the circulation of the sternum and confirmed that fluids infused into the bone marrow were quickly absorbed into the central circulation, providing a viable alternative to failed vascular access with traditional methods. However, a reliable, safe and easy method to access this intraosseous space proved elusive and this area of medicine and its opportunities remained largely unexplored.

In the mid-1990s, the technologies behind Vidacare's products were developed at the University of Texas Health Science Center, San Antonio, in the Athanasiou laboratory by Kyriacos A. Athanasiou, George Constantinides, and Dan Lanctot. In 2000, Dr. Larry Miller, an emergency physician for over 30 years and one of Vidacare's founders, set out to develop a technology platform that could be utilized in a broad range of healthcare settings. These applications included vascular access, bone marrow biopsies and aspirations, regenerative medicine, and more.

In 2001, Vidacare Corporation was established to bring this technology platform to market. In 2004, Vidacare received its first U.S. Food and Drug Administration (FDA) clearance for the EZ-IO Intraosseous Infusion System – the first battery-powered device to establish immediate vascular access using the IO space. In 2007, Vidacare received additional FDA clearance for the OnControl Bone Marrow System, the first significant improvement to bone marrow procedures in decades. In 2008, the company received FDA clearance for the OnControl Bone Access System for use in spinal surgery procedures.

In 2010, Vidacare claimed that its EZ-IO technology was used in 90 percent of U.S. advanced life support ambulances, over half of U.S. emergency departments, and by the U.S. military. The company stated it also was able to market the device in over 50 countries.

In December 2013, Teleflex Incorporated completed the acquisition of Vidacare, integrating its products into Teleflex's Arrow product line.

== Products ==
• Vidacare's first product, the EZ-IO Intraosseous Infusion System, provided immediate vascular access for the delivery of essential medications and fluids. The inventors of the EZ-IO are: Larry J. Miller, Robert W. Titkemeyer, David S. Bolleter, Ruben Trevino, Matthew T. Harmon and Christopher Kilcoin.

• Vidacare's OnControl Bone Marrow System was created to improve the procedures involving bone marrow biopsies and aspirations.

• The OnControl Bone Access System provided rapid and safe access to vertebrae during vertebroplasty.
