= Ezio Todini =

Italian academic

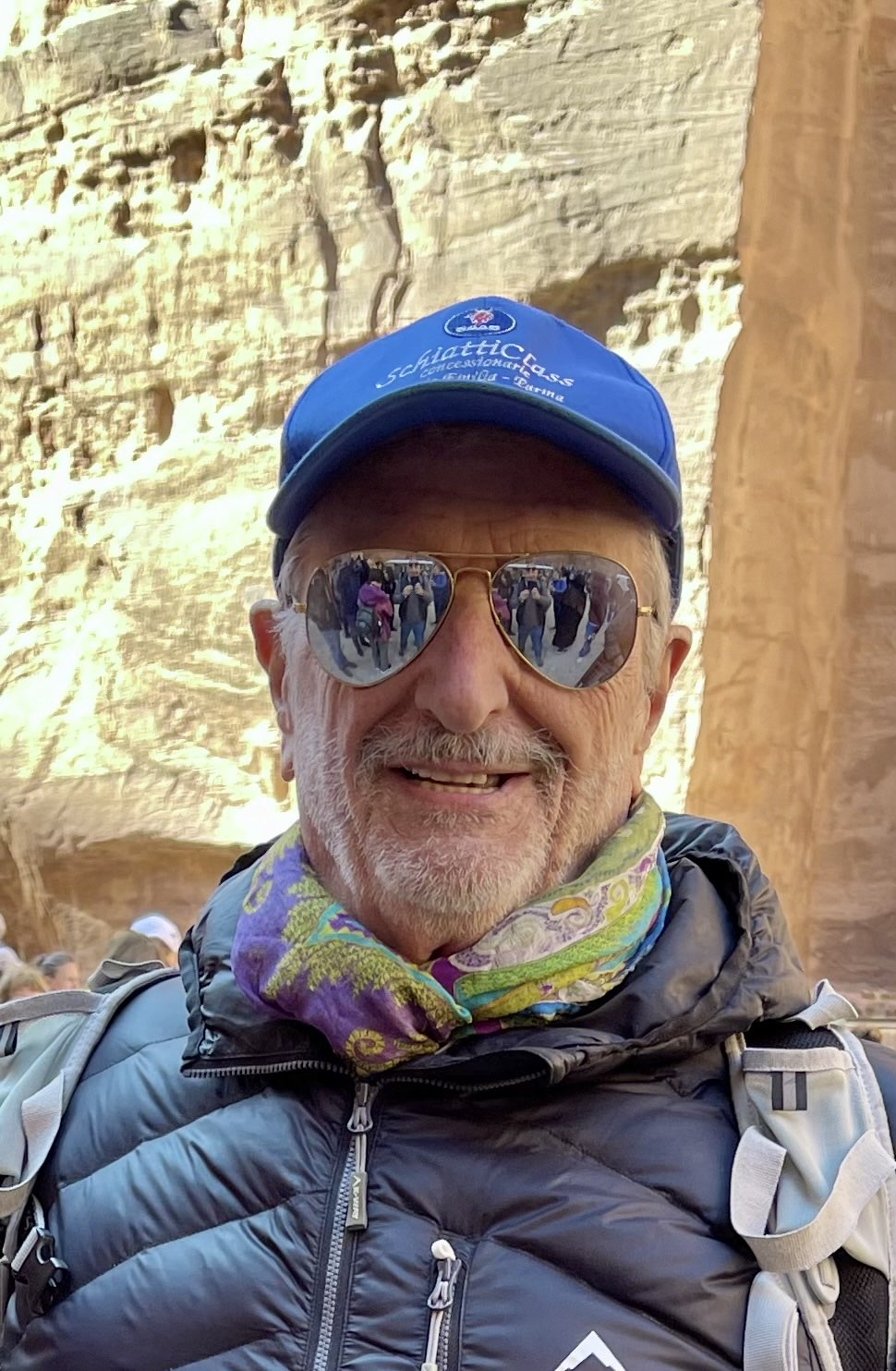
- Ezio Todini in Petra, Jordan, 2023
- Born: 5 June 1943 (age 83); Lucca, Italy
- Education: University of Pisa
- Occupation: Professor (retired)
- Children: 4
- Honours: Honorary President of the Italian Hydrological Society

Ezio Todini (born 5 June 1943) is an Italian academic, hydrologist and civil engineer.

== Early life and education ==
Ezio Todini born in Lucca, Italy on 5 June 1943, spent most of his early life and youth in Cairo, Egypt. In 1969, he was awarded the degree of Doctor in Hydraulic Engineering by the University of Pisa and joined the then just inaugurated IBM Pisa Scientific Centre in 1971.

== Career ==
In 1973, he became professor of applied hydromechanics at the University of Pisa. In 1979, he was appointed professor of water resources planning at the University of Florence. Since 1980, he has held the chair of hydrology at the University of Bologna. He retired as professor in 2010. In 2009, he was the founding president of the Italian Hydrological Society. Currently he has research collaborations with several universities and serves as water resources expert for international bodies and in particular for the World Bank.

Todini is a leading scientist in the development of hydrological modeling approaches for water resources management and planning. Since the mid-1970s, he pioneered the systems approach to hydrology and crafted a direction which guided hydrologic sciences into a new level of distributed hydrologic modelling, uncertainty quantification, and optimal parameter estimation via Kalman filtering. His Mutually Interactive State Parameter (MISP) algorithm based on an approach conceptually similar to the Gibbs sampler, introduced a novel methodology to the joint estimation of state and parameters in Kalman Filters, and served not only the hydrologic community at large but other fields of communications and environmental sciences.

In hydraulics, Todini largely contributed to the enhancement of design and simulation methods for flow in looped water distribution networks (WDN). In this context he authored the global gradient algorithm for the analysis of WDN. The algorithm is at the core of the worldwide used WDN analysis freeware EPANET. Moreover, in 2000 he introduced the resilience index, as the basis for implementing multi-objective Pareto design to WDN.

Todini initiated his research career dealing with hydrological models. Initially he proposed a quadratic programming alternative to the constrained estimation of unit hydrographs as an alternative to the linear programming approach proposed by Eagleson. The work was based on the seminal work of Norbert Wiener and Norman Levinson. This gave rise to the constrained linear systems (CLS) model, which favorably compared to the existing well known hydrological models at the WMO Project on Intercomparison of Conceptual Models Used for Hydrological Forecasting.

He also developed the ARNO hydrological model. ARNO was the first soil moisture accounting model to be included into a general circulation models (GCM) such as ECHAM GCM (Hamburg climate model). As distributed precipitation evolved, Todini developed the land surface model TOPKAPI. The model is structured around grids that capture soil and precipitation variably. He used Bayesian inference to determine flood risk based on long-term TOPKAPI simulations. The use of Bayesian inference in hydrological modelling allowed to separate out parameter and input uncertainty in operational river flow forecasting.

A major contribution to hydrology is the explanation for mass losses in flow computations on mild river bed slopes using the Muskingum-Cunge routing method and the proposition of a corrective approach for making the method mass conservative.

Another important contribution are his works on the quantification of forecasting uncertainty using multiple streamflow models through meta-Gaussian correlation-based ensemble averaging, an approach known as Model-Conditional Processor (MCP).

A major component of Todini's work has been the continuous transfer of the developed scientific approaches into operational tools to be used in the solution of real-world problems. The hydrological models, the flood routing models and the uncertainty post processors were thus integrated into operational real time flood forecasting packages installed on several rivers all around the world, such as the Po, the Arno and the Tiber in Italy, the Han Jang, the Yellow river, and the Fuchun river in China, the Duero, the Tajo, the Jucar and the Segura rivers in Spain.

He also contributed to the reference Handbook of Applied Hydrology.

Between 1984 and 1991, Todini served as vice-president of the IAHS International Commission on Water Resources Systems (ICWRS), and from 1991 to 1994 as vice-president of the IAHS. Between 2009 and 2016 he served as president the Società Idrologica Italiana – Italian Hydrological Society. From 2017 he has become the honorary president of SII-IHS.

Currently he acts as Honorary President of the Italian Hydrological Society and is a member of the scientific community of the World Wildlife Fund (WWF) Italy.
