= List of mayors of Monza =

Mayor of Monza
- Sindaco di Monza

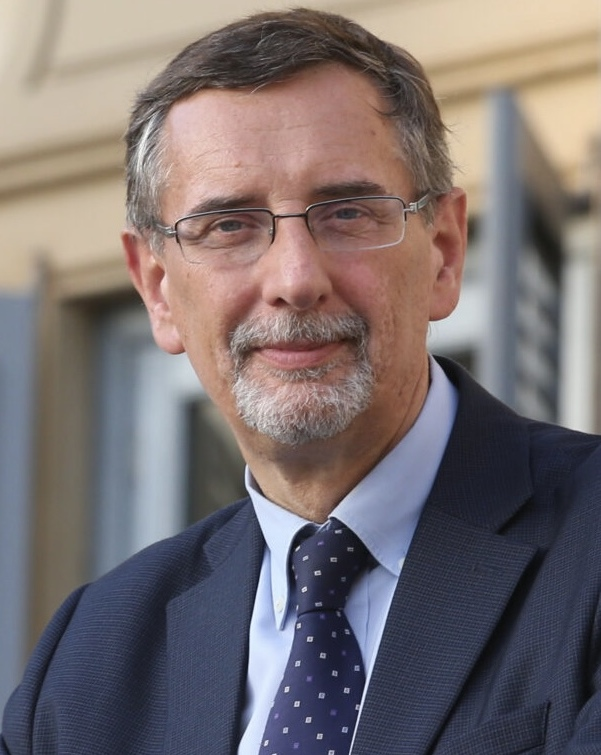
- Incumbent; Paolo Pilotto (PD) since 28 June 2022
- Appointer: Electorate of Monza
- Term length: 5 years, renewable once
- Formation: 1860
- Website: Official website

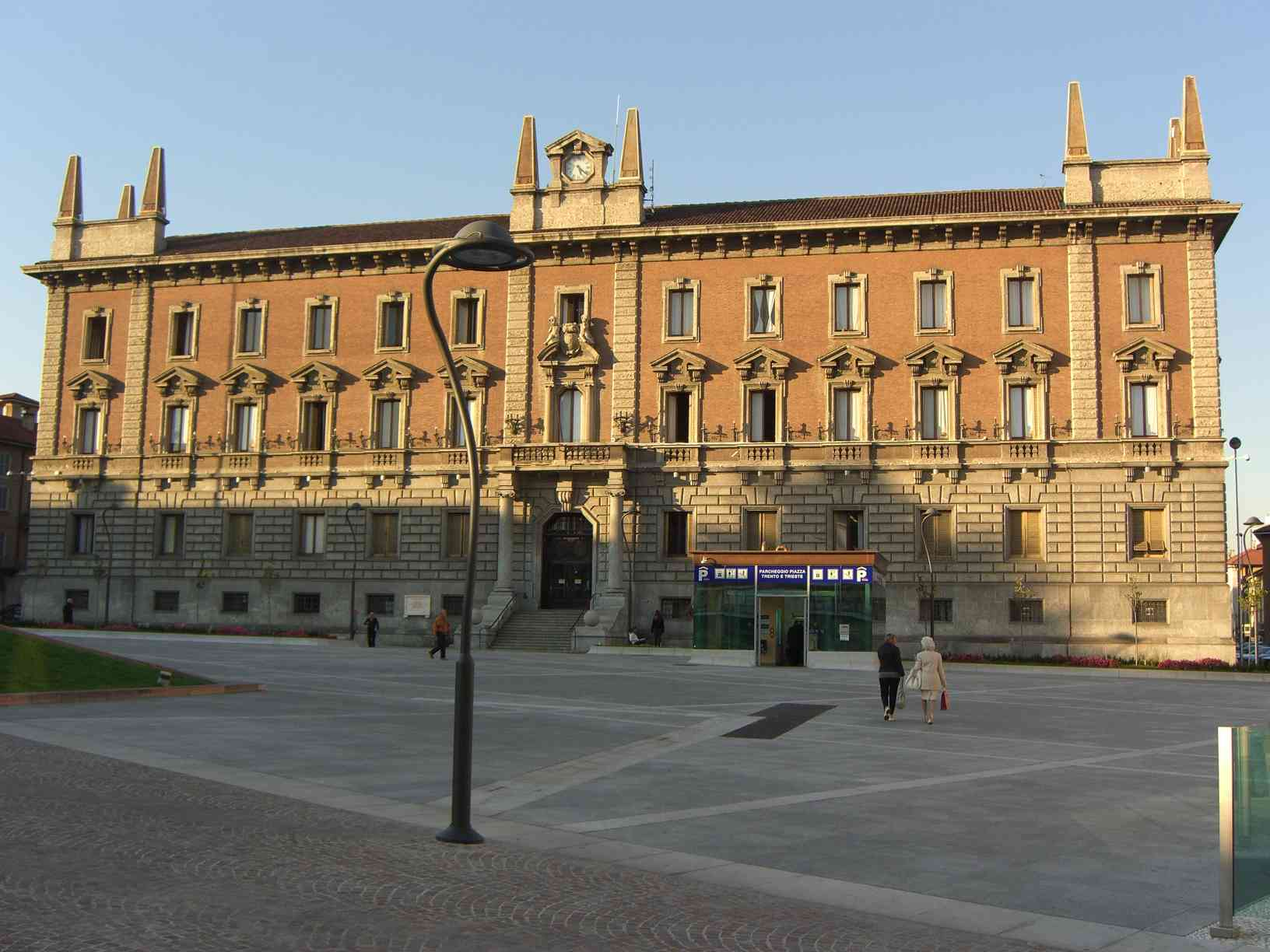
Palazzo Civico is the seat of the Mayor of Monza.

The mayor of Monza is an elected politician who, along with the Monza's city council, is accountable for the strategic government of Monza in Lombardy, Italy.

The current mayor is Paolo Pilotto (PD) who took office on 28 June 2022.

== Overview ==
According to the Italian Constitution, the mayor of Monza is member of the city council.

The mayor is elected by the population of Monza, who also elects the members of the city council, controlling the mayor's policy guidelines and is able to enforce his resignation by a motion of no confidence. The mayor is entitled to appoint and release the members of his government.

Since 1997 the mayor is elected directly by Monza's electorate: in all mayoral elections in Italy in cities with a population higher than 15,000 the voters express a direct choice for the mayor or an indirect choice voting for the party of the candidate's coalition. If no candidate receives at least 50% of votes, the top two candidates go to a second round after two weeks. The election of the City Council is based on a direct choice for the candidate with a preference vote: the candidate with the majority of the preferences is elected. The number of the seats for each party is determined proportionally.

== Republic of Italy (since 1946) ==
=== City Council election (1946-1997) ===
From 1946 to 1997, the mayor of Monza was elected by the city council.

	Mayor	Term start	Term end	Party	Election
1	Leo Sorteni	1946	1951	DC	1946
2	Carlo Zucca	1951	1956	DC	1951
3	Alfredo Casiraghi	1956	1960	DC	1956
4	Angelo Caimi	1960	1960	DC	1960
5	Giovanni Centemero	1960	1965	DC	1960
6	Giacomo Nava	1965	1970	DC	1964
7	Luigi Pavia	1970	1971	DC	1970
8	Pier Franco Bertazzini	1971	1975	DC	1970
9	Dario Chiarino	1975	1978	PRI	1975
10	Luigi Fumagalli	1978	1979	DC	1975
Special Prefectural Commissioner tenure (1979)
11	Emanuele Cirillo	1979	1983	DC	1979
12	Elio Malvezzi	1983	1985	DC	1983
13	Rosa Panzeri	1985	1988	DC	1983
13	Rosa Panzeri	1988	1991	DC	1988
14	Gian Mario Gatti	1991	1992	DC	1988
Special Prefectural Commissioner tenure (1992–1993)
15	Aldo Moltifiori	1993	1995	LN	1992
16	Mario Marcante	1995	1995	LN	1992
17	Marco Mariani	1995	1997	LN	1992

=== Direct election (since 1997) ===
Since 1997, under provisions of new local administration law, the mayor of Maonza is chosen by direct election every five years.

	Mayor	Term start	Term end	Party	Coalition	Election
18	Roberto Colombo	1 December 1997	10 June 2002	FI	FI • AN • CCD	1997
19	Michele Faglia	10 June 2002	29 May 2007	Ind	DS • DL • PRC	2002
(17)	Marco Mariani	29 May 2007	22 May 2012	LN	FI • AN • LN • UDC	2007
20	Roberto Scanagatti	22 May 2012	26 June 2017	PD	PD • SEL • IdV	2012
21	Dario Allevi	26 June 2017	28 June 2022	FI	FI • LN • FdI	2017
22	Paolo Pilotto	28 June 2022	Incumbent	PD	PD • SI	2022
