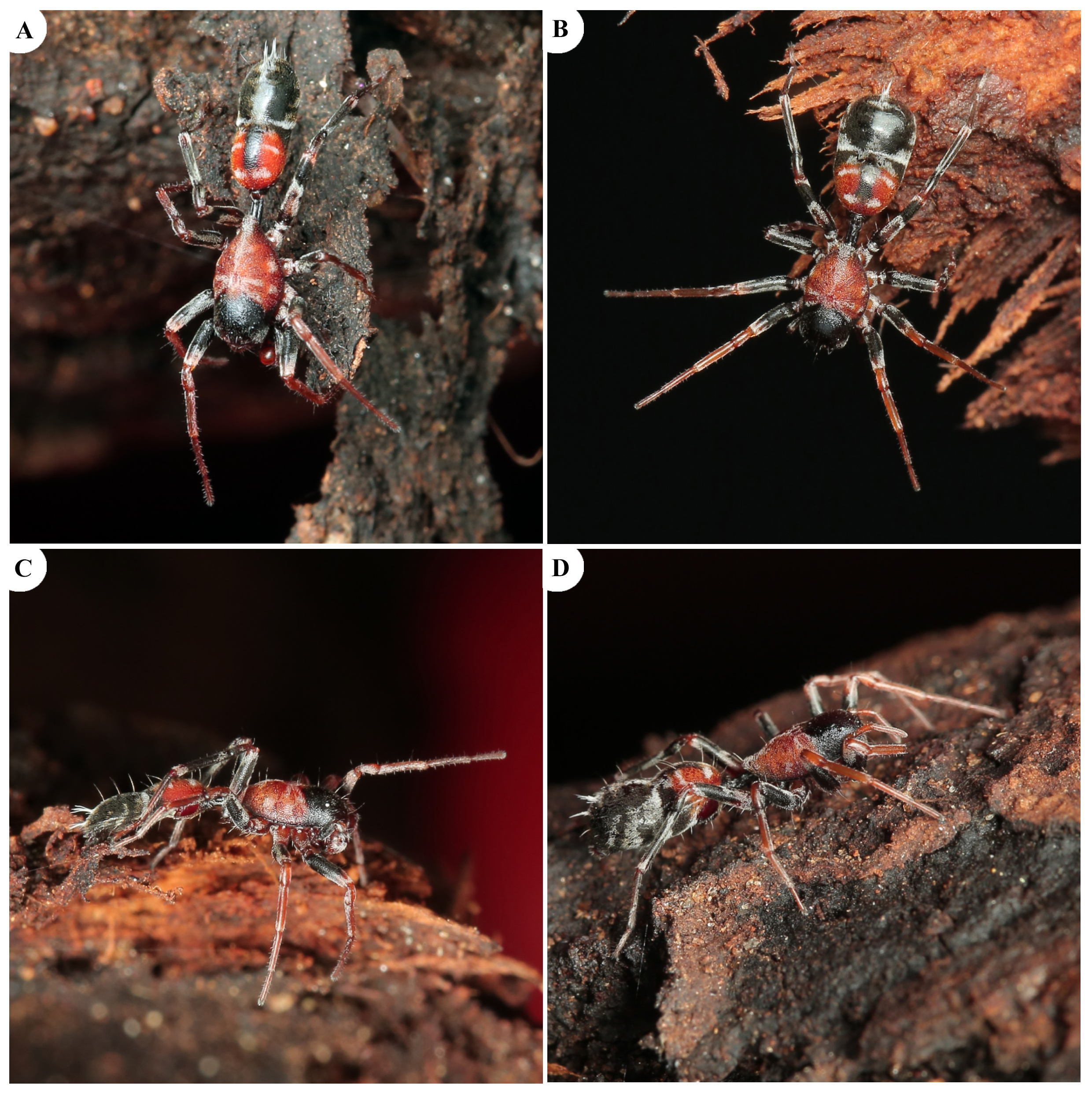
- A. decollatus

Scientific classification
- Domain: Eukaryota
- Kingdom: Animalia
- Phylum: Arthropoda
- Subphylum: Chelicerata
- Class: Arachnida
- Order: Araneae
- Infraorder: Araneomorphae
- Family: Corinnidae
- Genus: Aetius; O. Pickard-Cambridge, 1897

Type species
- A. decollatus O. Pickard-Cambridge, 1897

Species
- A. decollatus O. Pickard-Cambridge, 1897 — India, Sri Lanka; A. nocturnus Deeleman-Reinhold, 2001 — Thailand, Indonesia (Borneo); A. tuberculatus (Haddad, 2013) — Ivory Coast

= Aetius (spider) =

Genus of spiders

Aetius is a genus of Asian corinnid sac spiders, first described by Octavius Pickard-Cambridge in 1897. As of March 2019 it contains only three species.
