= Aristarchus of Sparta =

Spartan harmost of Byzantium (c. 400 BC)

Aristarchus (Ancient Greek: Ἀρίσταρχος) was a man of ancient Sparta who in 400 BC was sent out to succeed Cleander of Sparta as harmost of Byzantium.

The Greeks who had accompanied Cyrus the Younger in his expedition against his brother Artaxerxes II of Persia, had recently returned, and the main body of them had encamped near Byzantium. Several of them, however, had sold their arms and taken up their residence in the city itself. Aristarchus, following the instructions he had received from Anaxibius, the Spartan admiral, whom he had met at Cyzicus, sold all these, amounting to about 400 men, as slaves. Having been bribed by Pharnabazus II, he prevented the troops from recrossing into Asia and ravaging that satrap's province, and in various ways annoyed and ill-treated them.
