= Intraosseous infusion =

Medication injections into bone marrow

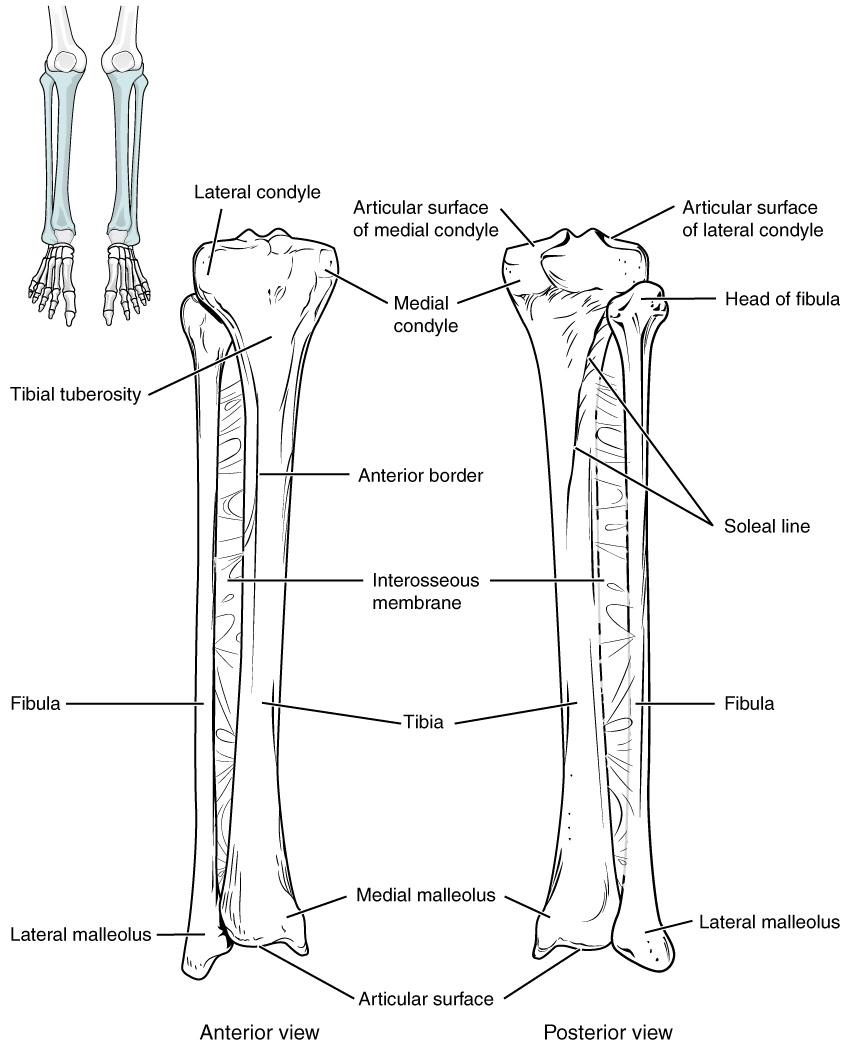
- The tibia IO insertion site is just below the medial condyle, labeled in this picture.
- Specialty: Emergency medicine
- MeSH: D017148
- eMedicine: 80431

Intraosseous infusion (IO) is the process of injecting medication, fluids, or blood products directly into the bone marrow; this provides a non-collapsible entry point into the systemic venous system. Intraosseous infusions allow for the administered medications and fluids to go directly into the vascular system. The IO route of fluid and medication administration is an alternative to the preferred intravenous (IV) route when the latter cannot be established promptly in emergency situations.

== Background ==
The use of the IV route to administer fluids has been around since the 1830s, and, in 1922, Cecil K. Drinker et al. saw that bone, specifically the sternum, could also be used as a route of administration for emergency purposes. To continue the expansion of knowledge regarding IO administration, a successful blood transfusion took place in 1940 using the sternum, and afterward, in 1941, Tocantins and O'Neill demonstrated successful vascular access using the bone marrow cavity of a long bone in rabbits. Because of Tocantins and O'Neill's success in their experiments with rabbits, human clinical trials were established using mainly the body of the sternum or the manubrium for access. Emanuel Papper and others then continued to advocate, research, and make advances on behalf of the IO administration. Once Papper showed that the bone marrow space could be used with comparable success to administer IV fluids and drugs, intraosseous infusion was popularized during World War II to prevent soldiers' deaths via hemorrhagic shock. While popular in the field during WWII, the use of IO was not seen as a standard for emergencies until the 1980s, and only so for children. With the rise of technology allowing the ease of technique of IO, and a lower risk of complications like bloodstream infections than when using peripheral access, the alternative of IO access has increased throughout the years for adults, as well. IO is now recommended in Advanced Cardiac and Pediatric Advanced Life Support treatment protocols, in cases where access via IV cannot be established on time.

== Indications ==
Intraosseous access is indicated in emergency situations, such as when a person experiences some type of major trauma like shock, cardiac arrest, severe dehydration, or severe gastrointestinal hemorrhage. IO access can provide the quickest way to rapidly infuse needed medications and fluids in an emergency situation. In people who experience critical trauma and who do not have adequate blood pressure, the IO route doubles the success rate of the peripheral IV route.

In addition to the emergency clinical scenario that can call for an IO route to be used, IO access is only indicated when access to peripheral veins is either not possible or delayed. When IV access is either not possible or delayed, other indications for utilizing the IO route include administering contrast if needed for radiology scans and drawing blood for laboratory testing and analysis. Situations that can result in decreased or delayed access to peripheral veins, and thus necessitate the use of an IO route to infuse medications and fluids include circumstances such as burns, fluid accumulation (edema), past IV drug use, obesity, and very low blood pressure.

== Contraindications ==
1. Having adequate and timely peripheral venous access is a major contraindication to obtaining IO access.
2. Fractures in the bone at the site of device insertion
3. Burn damage to the tissues around the site of device insertion
4. Cellulitis or other type of skin infection at the site of device insertion
5. Osteogenesis imperfecta, also referred to as Brittle Bone Disease
6. Osteoporosis
7. Osteomyelitis
8. Osteopetrosis
9. Osteopenia
10. Recent orthopedic surgery
11. A recent failed attempt at device insertion in the same bone

== Procedure ==
An IO infusion can be used on adult or pediatric populations when traditional methods of vascular access are difficult or otherwise cause unwanted delayed management of the administration of medications. The IO site can be used for 24 hours and should be removed as soon as intravenous access has been gained. Prolonged use of an IO site, lasting longer than 24 hours, is associated with osteomyelitis (an infection in the bone).

Intraosseous infusion-- needle insertion into anterior tibia

The needle is inserted through the bone's hard cortex and into the soft marrow interior, which allows immediate access to the vascular system. The IO needle is positioned at a 90-degree angle to the injection site, and is advanced through manual traction, impact driven force, or power driven. Each IO device has different designated insertion locations. The most common site of insertion is the antero-medial aspect of the upper, proximal tibia as this site lies just under the skin and is easily located. Other insertion sites include the anterior aspect of the femur, the superior iliac crest, proximal humerus, proximal tibia, distal tibia and the sternum (manubrium). Although intravascular access is still the preferred method for medication delivery in the prehospital area, IO access for adults has become more common. As of 2010, the American Heart Association no longer recommends using the endotracheal tube (ET) for resuscitation drugs, except as a last resort when IV or IO access cannot be gained. ET absorption of medications is poor, and optimal ET drug dosings are unknown. IO administration is becoming more common in civilian and military pre-hospital emergency medical services (EMS) systems globally.

Intraosseous access has roughly the same absorption rate as IV access, and allows for fluid resuscitation. For example, sodium bicarbonate can be administered IO during a cardiac arrest when IV access is unavailable. High flow rates are attainable with an IO infusion, up to 125 milliliters per minute. This high rate of flow is achieved using a pressure bag to administer the infusion directly into the bone. Large volume IO infusions are known to be painful. 1% lidocaine is used to ease the pain associated with large volume IO infusions in conscious people.

== Complications ==
Like any medical procedure, intraosseous infusion has some potential complications. In a review by Tyler et al., an analysis across the included studies found the overall complication rate associated with IO infusions to be less than 1% (0.9%).

Complications include:

- Bone fractures from the puncture devices
- Catheter misplacement which can lead to extravasation
- Bone and tissue damage from the puncturing device needle breaking off in the bone
- Compartment syndrome
- Osteomyelitis
- Epiphyseal plate injury in pediatric populations

Many of these potential complications can be prevented with simple measures like using good technique and keeping the period of IO infusion short by switching to IV as soon as it becomes feasible. Bone fracture complications can be decreased by using modern techniques and requiring more regular training in the methods of intraosseous marrow access for infusion. Extravasation can lead to the more serious complication of compartment syndrome. The risk of developing compartment syndrome can be reduced by medical personnel checking the infusion site regularly for any signs of swelling. Swelling could indicate misplacement of the catheter. Avoiding puncturing the same bone in 48 hours can also lessen the risk of developing this complication. The risk of osteomyelitis, while very low ( <1%), can be further lessened by using sterile, hygienic practices and modern devices to make the puncture. Damage to the epiphyseal plate can be avoided by training medical personnel about proper landmarks to be used for determining puncture sites.

== Devices ==
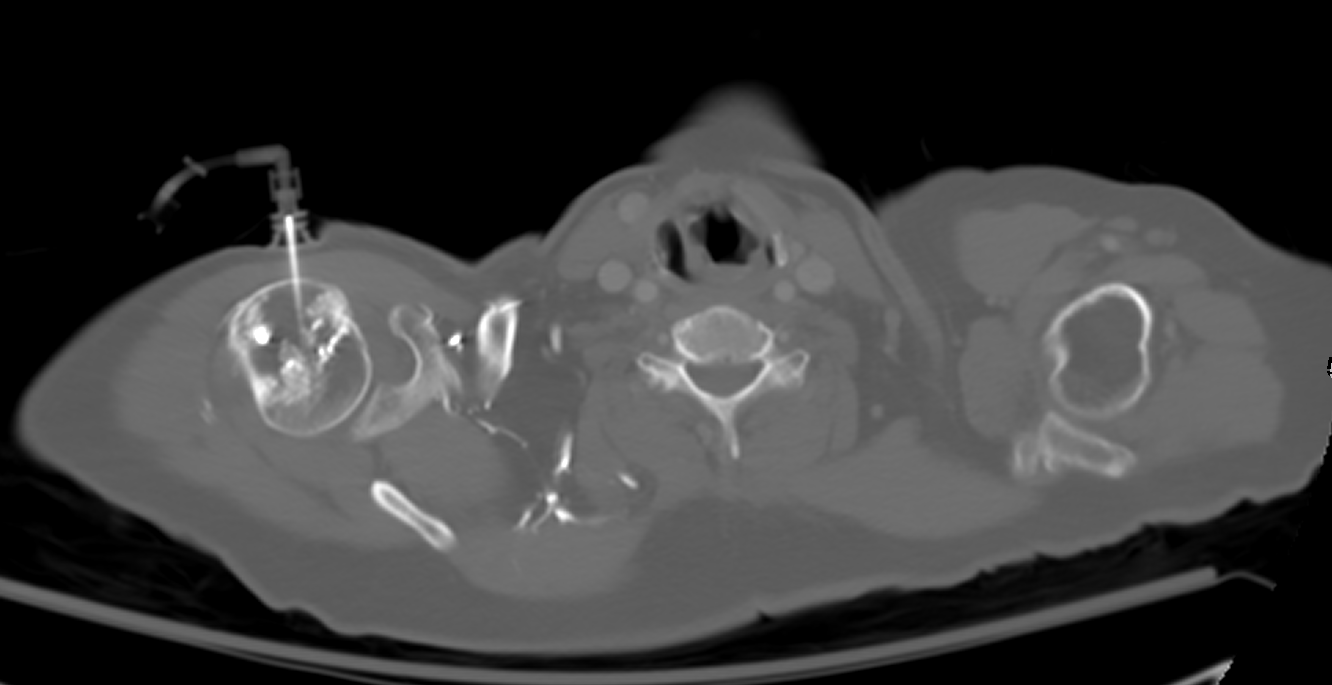
Axial CT with left humeral head EZ-IO (power driver device) infusion of contrast.

Intraosseous devices allow quick and safe access to the vascular system for fluid and drug administration. After proper education and training, medical professionals can obtain vascular access via the IO route of administration by using one of the multiple devices that have been approved by the FDA for 24-hour use. There are several FDA approved IO devices, categorized by their mechanism of action:

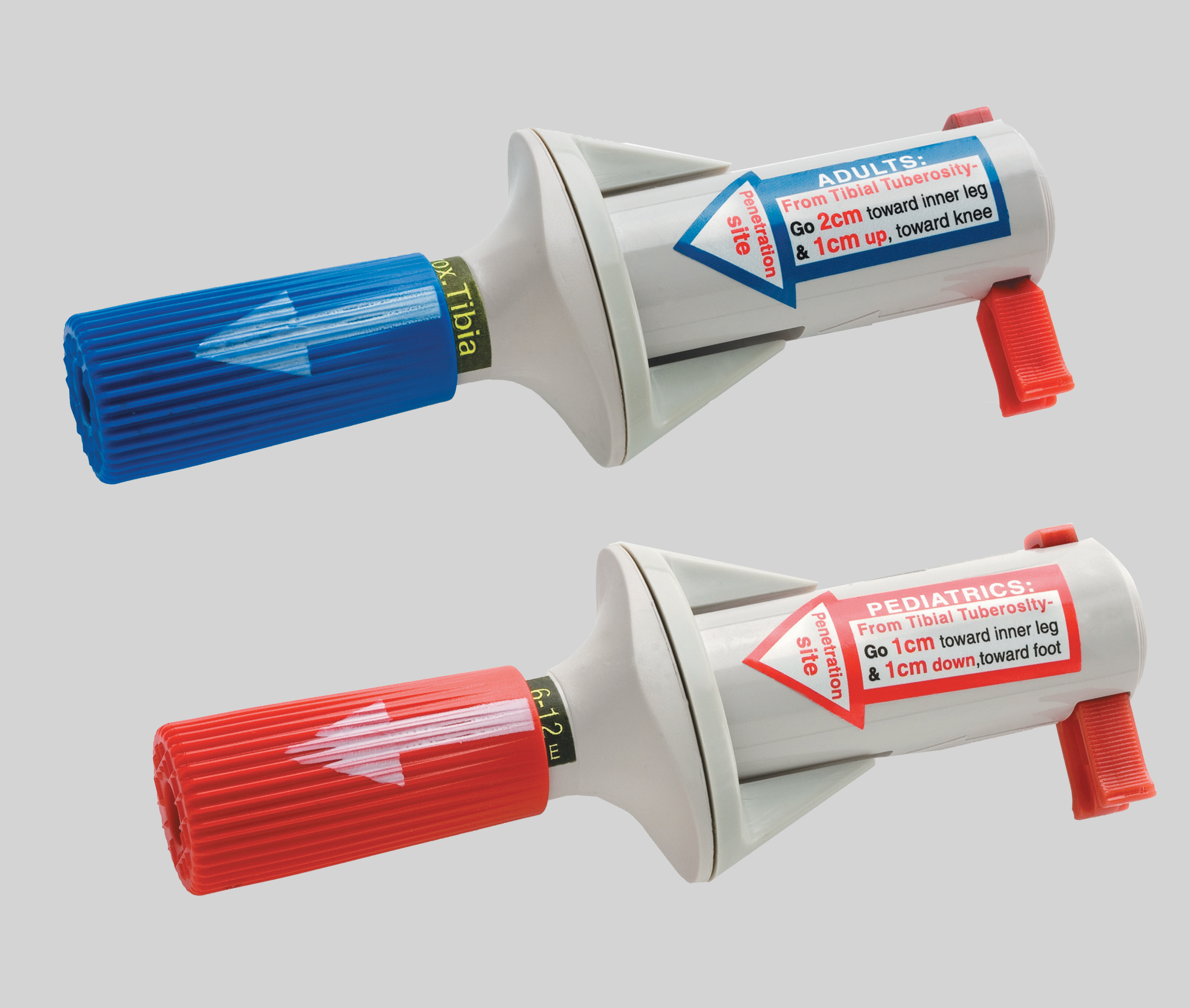
BIG IO devices (spring-loaded)

1. Power Driver: EZ-IO By Arrow Teleflex.
  - The EZ-IO device is a small device that works like a traditional drill and drill bit, consisting of a reusable, battery-powered driver and disposable, hollow IO needle. A trigger allows for the IO needle to enter the bone marrow space at a preset length without any pressure being applied. In the United States, the FDA has approved the use of the EZ-IO device in the proximal tibia and the head of the humerus.
2. Spring-Loaded: the Bone Injection Gun (BIG) and the Pyng Medical Corporation FAST 1
  - The First Access for Shock and Trauma (FAST 1) spring-loaded device is designed for use in the sternum of an adult. The FAST 1 device consists of multiple needles in a probe that penetrates the manubrium once manual pressure is applied.
  - The Bone Injection Gun (BIG) device is a small, plastic, disposable, spring-loaded device that has a trigger that shoots the IO needle into the IO insertion site, which is more than likely in the proximal tibia.
3. Manual / Hand Powered: Hollow steel manually inserted needles have been around since the inception of IO administration, and use a removable trocar to aid in the insertion of the needle. Dense adult bone limits its use, but manual devices are commonly used in children because of their safety profile and ease of use, once training has taken place. The three most widely used are:
  - Cardinal Health Jamshidi/Illinois needle
  - Cook Critical Care threaded Sur-Fast needle
  - Cook Critical Care Dieckman modified needle

Each device is capable of achieving rapid vascular access, despite the mechanism of action, with insertion times comparable to the IV administration route.

== Special populations ==
=== Pediatrics ===
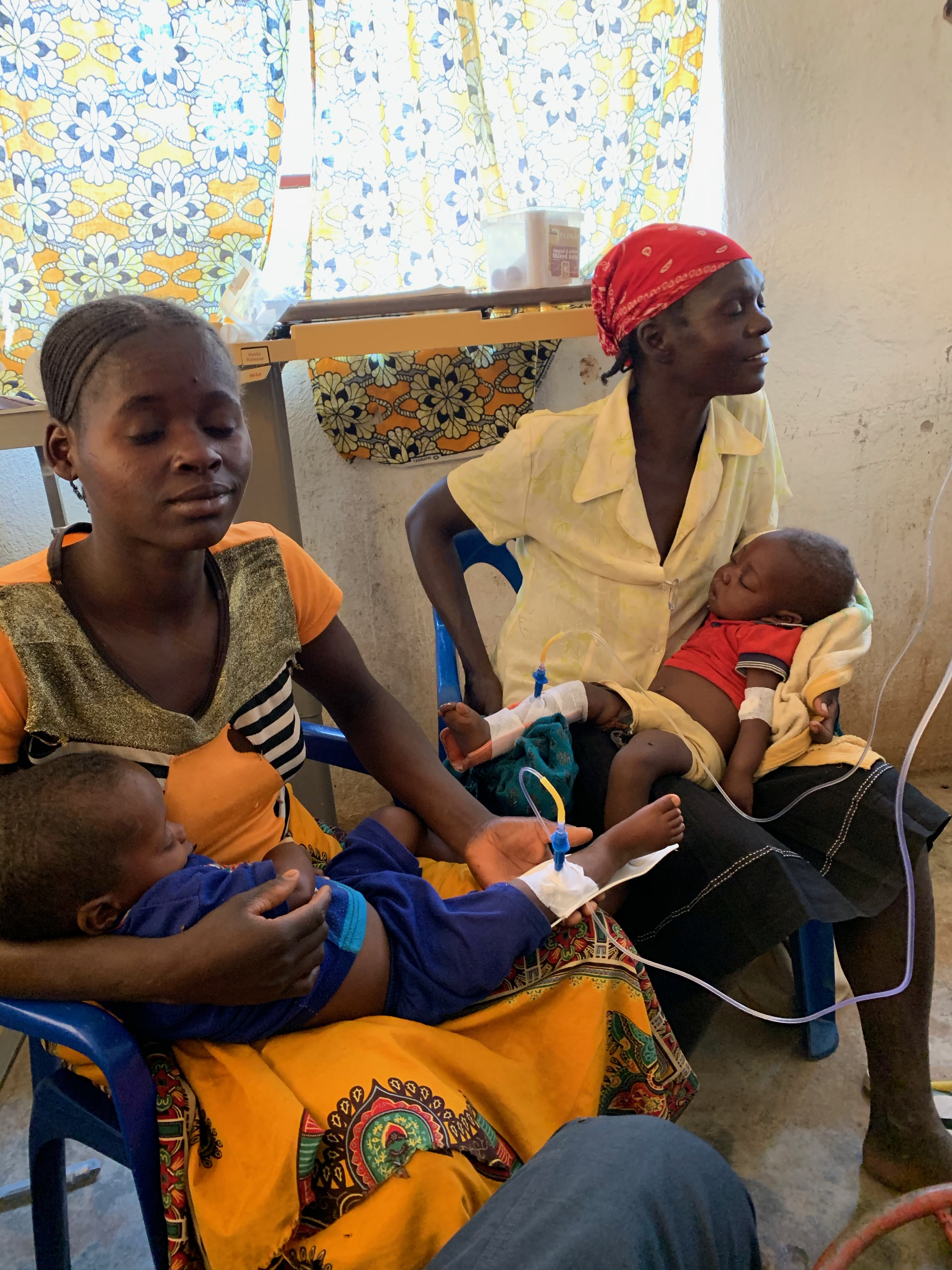
Intraosseous infusion, pediatric

A comparison of intravenous (IV), intramuscular (IM), and intraosseous (IO) routes of administration concluded that the intraosseous (IO) route is the preferred method versus intramuscular (IM) and comparable to intravenous (IV) administration in delivering pediatric anaesthetic drugs.

Intraosseous infusion (IO) is used in pediatric populations during anesthesia when other intravenous access, central venous catherization or venous cutdown, are difficult to use or cannot be used. When individuals are severely ill and need "rapid, efficient, and safe delivery of drugs", IO is used. When inserting the intraosseous needle into a conscious individual, this can be very painful. For children, anesthesia is not recommended before this procedure for non-emergency situations. Instead, distracting and holding the child is preferred. Intraosseous infusion is used in instances such as, "immediate indication/life-threatening emergency, cardiac/respiratory arrest, acute shock, hypothermia, obesity, edema, thermal injury, etc."

For children, the preferred sites of IO are the distal tibia, proximal tibia, and distal femur. The distal end of the tibia is the preferred site because it is easy to access and the most reliable. Depending on the procedure, a variety of needles are used for IO. For example, "standard steel hypodermic, butterfly, spinal, trephine, sternal, and standard bone marrow needles are used." Needles that have a short shaft are preferred and safe. For infants up to 6 to 8 months old, 18-gauge needles are used and for children more than 8 months old, 15- or 16- gauge needles are used. A study by Glaeser et al., concluded that individuals who received IO vs. peripheral and central intravenous access were able to obtain much faster and more successful IO access. Another study, by Fiorito et al., observed the safety of IO use during the transportation of critically ill pediatric individuals. Based on the results, they concluded that the use of IO was safe, based on 78% successful placement of the IO needle and complications that occurred in only 12% of the cases.

Similarly to adults, contraindications for IO infusion use in pediatrics include bone diseases such as osteogenesis imperfecta and osteopetrosis, and fractures. Others include cellulitis, burns, and infections at the access site.
