= Sicamus Aëtius =

Byzantine medical writer

Sicamus Aëtius (Ancient Greek: Σικάμιος ὁ Ἀέτιος), sometimes called Aëtius Sicanius or Siculus, was a Byzantine medical writer and the author of a treatise On Melancholy (Περί Μελαγχολιάς), Latin De Melancholia, which is commonly printed among the works of Galen. His date is uncertain, but if he is not the same person as Aëtius of Amida, he must have lived after him, as his treatise corresponds exactly with part of the latter's great medical work. It is compiled from Galen, Rufus of Ephesus, Posidonius, and Marcellus Empiricus.
