= 2016 Naples municipal election =

← 2011	5 and 19 June 2016	2021 →
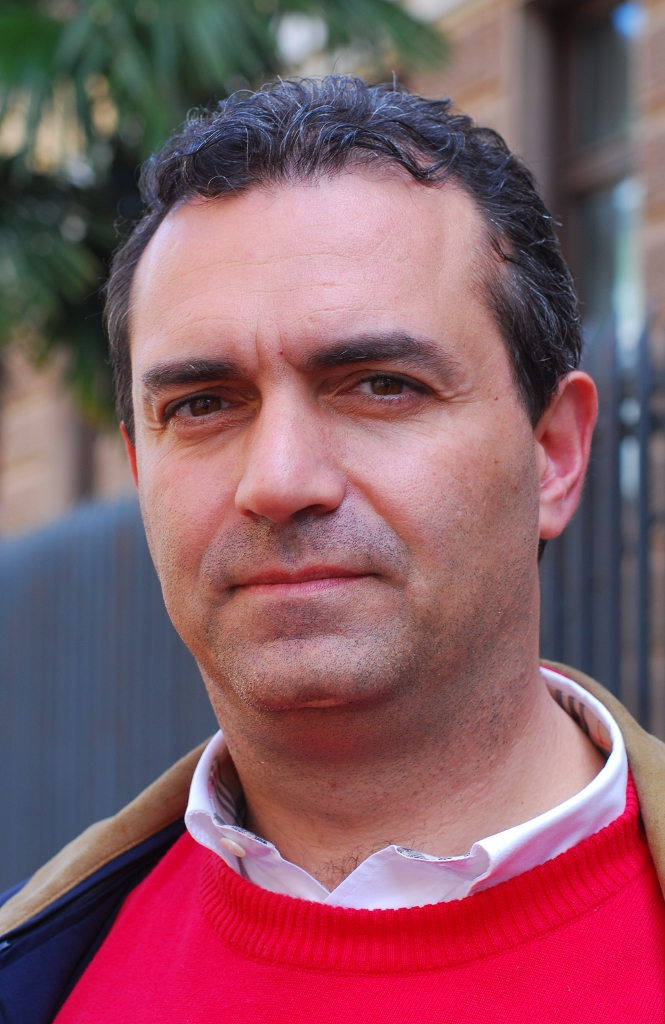

Candidate	Luigi de Magistris	Gianni Lettieri
Party	DemA	Forza Italia
Popular vote	172,710	96,961
Percentage	42.82%	24.04%
Popular vote (2nd)	185,907	92,174
Percentage (2nd)	66.85%	33.15%
Mayor before election
Luigi de Magistris
Independent
Elected mayor
Luigi de Magistris

Municipal elections were held in Naples on 5 June 2016.

== Voting system ==
The voting system is used for all mayoral elections in Italy, in the city with a population higher than 15,000 inhabitants. Under this system voters express a direct choice for the mayor or an indirect choice voting for the party of the candidate's coalition. If no candidate receives 50% of votes, the top two candidates go to a second round after two weeks. This gives a result whereby the winning candidate may be able to claim majority support, although it is not guaranteed.

The election of the City Council is based on a direct choice for the candidate with a preference vote: the candidate with the majority of the preferences is elected. The number of the seats for each party is determined proportionally.

== Parties and candidates ==
This is a list of the parties (and their respective leaders) which participated in the election.

Political force or alliance	Constituent lists	Leader
Left-wing coalition	Democracy and Autonomy (DeMa)	Luigi de Magistris
Left-wing coalition	Naples in Common to the Left (incl. SEL, PRC, PCdI, AET, Pos)	Luigi de Magistris
Left-wing coalition	Federation of the Greens (FdV)	Luigi de Magistris
Left-wing coalition	Italy of Values (IdV)	Luigi de Magistris
Left-wing coalition	Civic lists	Luigi de Magistris
Centre-left coalition	Democratic Party (PD)	Valeria Valente
Centre-left coalition	Popular Naples (NP)	Valeria Valente
Centre-left coalition	Citizens for Naples (CpN)	Valeria Valente
Centre-left coalition	Union of the Centre (UdC)	Valeria Valente
Centre-left coalition	Italian Socialist Party (PSI)	Valeria Valente
Centre-left coalition	Liberal Popular Alliance – Autonomies (ALA)	Valeria Valente
Centre-left coalition	Italian Republican Party – Italian Liberal Party (PRI–PLI)	Valeria Valente
Five Star Movement	Five Star Movement (M5S)	Matteo Brambilla
Centre-right coalition	Forza Italia (FI)	Gianni Lettieri
Centre-right coalition	Civic lists	Gianni Lettieri
Right-wing coalition	Brothers of Italy (FdI)	Marcello Taglialatela
Right-wing coalition	Naples Our Land (NTN)	Marcello Taglialatela

== Results ==
Summary of the 2016 Naples City Council election results
Candidates	I round		II round		Leaders seats	Parties	Votes	%	Seats
Candidates	Votes	%	Votes	%	Leaders seats	Parties	Votes	%	Seats
Luigi de Magistris	172,710	42.82	185,907	66.85	–	De Magistris for Mayor	51,896	13.79	10
Luigi de Magistris	172,710	42.82	185,907	66.85	–	Democracy and Autonomy	28,587	7.60	5
Luigi de Magistris	172,710	42.82	185,907	66.85	–	Naples in Common to the Left	19,945	5.30	4
Luigi de Magistris	172,710	42.82	185,907	66.85	–	The City with de Magistris	13,413	3.56	2
Luigi de Magistris	172,710	42.82	185,907	66.85	–	Federation of the Greens	11,341	3.01	2
Luigi de Magistris	172,710	42.82	185,907	66.85	–	Ce Simme Sfasteriati	5,958	1.58	1
Luigi de Magistris	172,710	42.82	185,907	66.85	–	Democratic Republicans	4,276	1.14	–
Luigi de Magistris	172,710	42.82	185,907	66.85	–	Italy of Values	4,248	1.13	–
Luigi de Magistris	172,710	42.82	185,907	66.85	–	Common Good with de Magistris	3,243	0.86	–
Luigi de Magistris	172,710	42.82	185,907	66.85	–	Mo! Autonomist Naples	3,179	0.84	–
Luigi de Magistris	172,710	42.82	185,907	66.85	–	Meridionalists	1,858	0.49	–
Luigi de Magistris	172,710	42.82	185,907	66.85	–	Party of the South	1,796	0.48	–
Gianni Lettieri	96,961	24.04	92,174	33.15	1	Forza Italia	36,145	9.61	3
Gianni Lettieri	96,961	24.04	92,174	33.15	1	Lettieri for Mayor	28,869	7.67	2
Gianni Lettieri	96,961	24.04	92,174	33.15	1	Naples for Capital	12,374	3.29	1
Gianni Lettieri	96,961	24.04	92,174	33.15	1	Making the City	6,541	1.74	–
Gianni Lettieri	96,961	24.04	92,174	33.15	1	Young People on the Run	3,929	1.04	–
Gianni Lettieri	96,961	24.04	92,174	33.15	1	Italy 20.50	1,778	0.47	–
Gianni Lettieri	96,961	24.04	92,174	33.15	1	Pensioners of Europe	763	0.20	–
Gianni Lettieri	96,961	24.04	92,174	33.15	1	Christian Revolution	761	0.20	–
Gianni Lettieri	96,961	24.04	92,174	33.15	1	Joint Enterprise	705	0.19	–
Gianni Lettieri	96,961	24.04	92,174	33.15	1	Construction and State	496	0.13	–
Valeria Valente	85,225	21.13	–	–	1	Democratic Party	43,790	11.64	5
Valeria Valente	85,225	21.13	–	–	1	Popular Naples	7,521	2.00	1
Valeria Valente	85,225	21.13	–	–	1	Citizens for Naples	6,891	1.83	–
Valeria Valente	85,225	21.13	–	–	1	#NapoliVale	6,649	1.77	–
Valeria Valente	85,225	21.13	–	–	1	Democratic Centre	6,394	1.70	–
Valeria Valente	85,225	21.13	–	–	1	Liberal Popular Alliance – Autonomies	5,361	1.42	–
Valeria Valente	85,225	21.13	–	–	1	Union of the Centre	4,104	1.09	–
Valeria Valente	85,225	21.13	–	–	1	Moderates	3,333	0.89	–
Valeria Valente	85,225	21.13	–	–	1	National Elaboratory	2,565	0.68	–
Valeria Valente	85,225	21.13	–	–	1	Italian Socialist Party	1,677	0.45	–
Valeria Valente	85,225	21.13	–	–	1	Italian Liberal Party – Italian Republican Party	701	0.19	–
Matteo Brambilla	38,863	9.64	–	–	1	Five Star Movement	36,359	9.66	1
Marcello Taglialatela	5,186	1.29	–	–	–	Brothers of Italy	4,829	1.28	–
Marcello Taglialatela	5,186	1.29	–	–	–	Naples Our Land	282	0.07	–
Luigi Mercogliano	1,489	0.37	–	–	–	The People of the Family	1,416	0.38	–
Martina Alboreto	1,207	0.30	–	–	–	Brothers of the Italian People	1,021	0.27	–
Nunzia Amura	1,082	0.27	–	–	–	Communist Party	765	0.20	–
Paolo Prudente	331	0.08	–	–	–	Workers' Communist Party	291	0.08	–
Domenico Esposito	257	0.06	–	–	–	Life Quality	213	0.06	–
Total	403,311	100.00	278,081	100.00	3		376,263	100.00	37
Source: Ministry of the Interior

According to the Italian electoral law 1993 for the municipalities, if a defeated candidate for mayor obtained over 3% of the votes, the mayoral candidate is automatically elected communal councillor (Lettieri, Valente and Brambilla); the elected mayor is not a member of municipal council, but De Magistris votes in the municipal council.

Popular vote
DMS	13.79%
PD	11.63%
M5S	9.66%
FI	9.60%
PN	7.67%
DemA	7.59%
NCS	5.30%
The City	3.56%
NC	3.28%
FdV	3.01%

Mayor (1st round)
De Magistris	42.82%
Lettieri	24.04%
Valente	21.13%
Brambilla	9.63%
Taglialatela	1.28%

Mayor (2nd round)
De Magistris	66.85%
Lettieri	33.15%

== See also ==
- Municipal elections in Naples
