= 2021 Naples municipal election =

Election in Naples

- 3 and 4 October 2021
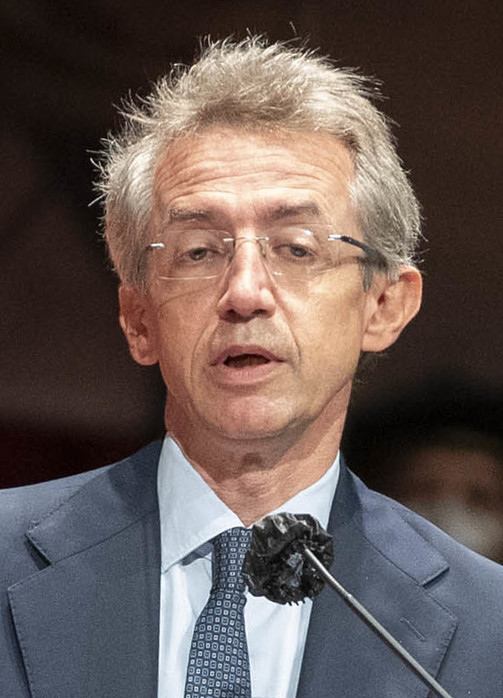

	Majority party	Minority party
Candidate	Gaetano Manfredi	Catello Maresca
Party	Independent	Independent
Alliance	Centre-left	Centre-right
Seats won	28	7
Popular vote	218,077	75,891
Percentage	62.9%	21.9%
Mayor before election
Luigi de Magistris
DemA
Elected mayor
Gaetano Manfredi
Independent

The municipal elections in Naples took place on 3 and 4 October 2021. The incumbent Mayor of Naples was Luigi de Magistris of Democracy and Autonomy, who won the 2016 Naples municipal election.

== Electoral system ==
The voting system is used for all mayoral elections in Italy, in the cities with a population higher than 15,000 inhabitants. Under this system, voters express a direct choice for the mayor or an indirect choice voting for the party of the candidate's coalition. If no candidate receives 50% of votes during the first round, the top two candidates go to a second round after two weeks. The winning candidate obtains a majority bonus equal to 60% of seats. During the first round, if no candidate gets more than 50% of votes but a coalition of lists gets the majority of 50% of votes or if the mayor is elected in the first round but its coalition gets less than 40% of the valid votes, the majority bonus cannot be assigned to the coalition of the winning mayor candidate.

The election of the City Council is based on a direct choice for the candidate with a maximum of two preferential votes, each for a different gender, belonging to the same party list: the candidate with the majority of the preferences is elected. The number of the seats for each party is determined proportionally, using D'Hondt seat allocation. Only coalitions with more than 3% of votes are eligible to get any seats.

== Background ==
The center-left coalition did not nominate their candidate through a primary election, in order to avoid the same troubles that happened during the previous municipal primary election in Naples. Through the municipal secretary of the Democratic Party Marco Sarracino, the coalition sought an alliance with the Five Star Movement and Italian Left.

== Parties and candidates ==
This is a list of the parties (and their respective leaders) which participated in the election.

Political force or alliance	Constituent lists	Candidate
Bassolino coalition	Bassolino x Naples	Antonio Bassolino
Bassolino coalition	With Naples	Antonio Bassolino
Bassolino coalition	Naples is Naples	Antonio Bassolino
Bassolino coalition	Gay Party	Antonio Bassolino
Bassolino coalition	Action	Antonio Bassolino
Clemente coalition	Alessandra Clemente for Mayor (incl. DemA, PRC, PCI, PdS)	Alessandra Clemente
Clemente coalition	Naples 20 30	Alessandra Clemente
Clemente coalition	Power to the People	Alessandra Clemente
Centre-left coalition	Democratic Party	Gaetano Manfredi
Centre-left coalition	Five Star Movement	Gaetano Manfredi
Centre-left coalition	Solidarity Naples Left (incl. Art.1, SI, PSI)	Gaetano Manfredi
Centre-left coalition	Us Campanians for the City	Gaetano Manfredi
Centre-left coalition	Democratic Centre	Gaetano Manfredi
Centre-left coalition	Green Europe	Gaetano Manfredi
Centre-left coalition	Moderates	Gaetano Manfredi
Centre-left coalition	Democratic Republicans	Gaetano Manfredi
Centre-left coalition	Manfredi List	Gaetano Manfredi
Centre-left coalition	Azzurri – We the South – Napoli Viva	Gaetano Manfredi
Centre-left coalition	Free Naples	Gaetano Manfredi
Centre-left coalition	For People and the Community	Gaetano Manfredi
Centre-left coalition	Now Naples	Gaetano Manfredi
Centre-right coalition	European Liberal Party	Catello Maresca
Centre-right coalition	Brothers of Italy	Catello Maresca
Centre-right coalition	Forza Italia	Catello Maresca
Centre-right coalition	Cambiamo!	Catello Maresca
Centre-right coalition	Us with Italy – AdC – Neapolitan Renaissance	Catello Maresca
Centre-right coalition	Being Naples	Catello Maresca
Centre-right coalition	Naples Capital (incl. PdF, LSA, SeF)	Catello Maresca
Centre-right coalition	Neapolitan Pride	Catello Maresca
3V Movement		Giovanni Moscarella
August 24th Movement		Rosa Solombrino
Naples on the move – No alliances		Matteo Brambilla

== Potential and declined candidates ==
=== Potential ===
==== Centre-left coalition ====
- Umberto De Gregorio, President of the Ente Autonomo Volturno
- Gennaro Migliore, Member of the Chamber of Deputies since 2013
- Nicola Oddati, municipal assessor for Naples (2006–2011)

==== Centre-right coalition ====
- Gianluigi Cimmino, CEO of Yamamay and Carpisa
- Sergio Rastrelli, lawyer
- Riccardo Monti, manager

=== Declined ===
==== Centre-left coalition ====
- Vincenzo Amendola, Minister of European Affairs (2019–2021)
- Roberto Fico, President of the Chamber of Deputies since 2018

==== Centre-right coalition ====
- Danilo Iervolino, President of UniPegaso

== Opinion polls ==
=== Candidates ===
==== First round ====
View source data.

Date	Polling firm/ Client	Sample size	Clemente	Maresca	Manfredi	Bassolino	Others	Lead
4 October 2021	Election result	-	5.6	21.9	62.9	8.2	1.5	25.7
13–15 Sep 2021	BiDiMedia	1,035	9.1	22.5	48.0	17.5	2.5	25.5
12–15 Sep 2021	Noto	1,000	7.0	28.0	44.0	18.0	3.0	16.0
6–11 Sep 2021	Ipsos	1,000	11.0	29.5	45.5	11.0	3.0	16.0
8–10 Sep 2021	Winpoll	800	9.7	21.1	47.4	17.3	4.5	26.3
7–10 Sep 2021	Quorum	805	8.3	25.9	47.9	17.1	0.8	22.0
3–8 Sep 2021	YouTrend	802	7.4	26.2	48.2	17.4	0.8	22.0
2 Sep 2021	Demopolis	—N/a	6.0	29.0	46.0	15.0	4.0	17.0
10 Aug 2021	Opinio Italia	—N/a	7.0	29.0	44.0	16.0	4.0	15.0
1 Jul 2021	Lab2101	—N/a	20.7	23.5	40.2	8.9	6.7	16.7
23 Jun 2021	Tecnè	1,000	8.2	30.6	41.6	13.8	5.8	11.0
18–20 Jun 2021	Tecnè	800	8.0	31.0	42.0	13.0	6.0	11.0
14–16 Jun 2021	Winpoll	800	14.2	23.3	40.4	17.2	4.9	17.1
1–2 Jun 2021	Noto	2,000	6.0	38.0	43.0	6.0	7.0	5.0

==== Second round ====
Manfredi vs. Maresca

Date	Polling firm/ Client	Sample size	Manfredi	Maresca	Lead
13–15 Sep 2021	BiDiMedia	1,035	66.0	34.0	32.0
6–11 Sep 2021	Ipsos	1,000	63.0	37.0	26.0
8–10 Sep 2021	Winpoll	800	63.5	36.5	27.0
7–10 Sep 2021	Quorum	805	69.9	30.1	39.8
3–8 Sep 2021	YouTrend	802	69.2	30.8	38.4
1 Jul 2021	Lab2101	—N/a	55.2	44.8	10.4
14–16 Jun 2021	Winpoll	800	62.6	37.4	25.2

Manfredi vs. Bassolino

Date	Polling firm/ Client	Sample size	Manfredi	Bassolino	Lead
13–15 Sep 2021	BiDiMedia	1,035	53.0	47.0	6.0
8–10 Sep 2021	Winpoll	800	57.2	42.8	14.4
1 Jul 2021	Lab2101	—N/a	72.8	27.2	45.6
14–16 Jun 2021	Winpoll	800	56.3	43.7	12.6

Manfredi vs. Clemente

Date	Polling firm/ Client	Sample size	Manfredi	Clemente	Lead
13–15 Sep 2021	BiDiMedia	1,035	68.0	32.0	36.0
8–10 Sep 2021	Winpoll	800	67.8	31.2	36.6
1 Jul 2021	Lab2101	—N/a	51.2	48.8	2.4

Bassolino vs. Maresca

Date	Polling firm/ Client	Sample size	Bassolino	Maresca	Lead
1 Jul 2021	Lab2101	—N/a	45.1	54.9	9.8
14–16 Jun 2021	Winpoll	800	52.2	47.8	4.4

Bassolino vs. Clemente

Date	Polling firm/ Client	Sample size	Bassolino	Clemente	Lead
1 Jul 2021	Lab2101	—N/a	38.8	61.2	22.4

Clemente vs. Maresca

Date	Polling firm/ Client	Sample size	Clemente	Maresca	Lead
1 Jul 2021	Lab2101	—N/a	55.3	44.7	10.6

=== Parties ===
Date	Polling firm	Sample size	Left-wing		Centre-left						Centre-right				Centre		Others	Undecided	Lead
Date	Polling firm	Sample size	DemA	Other	PD	M5S	EV	IV	Art.1-SI	Other	FI	FdI	Lega	Other	A	Other	Others	Undecided	Lead
13–15 Sep 2021	BiDiMedia	1,035	4.5	4.8	14.4	13.8	1.8	4.4	—N/a	15.4	3.4	7.6	2.6	8.7	2.2	13.3	3.1	22.0	0.6
6–11 Sep 2021	Ipsos	1,000	6.5	5.3	17.4	18.6	13.3				5.3	7.1	3.5	14.2	8.0		0.8	—N/a	1.2
8–10 Sep 2021	Winpoll	800	10.9		18.7	15.5	2.6	9.7			5.6	7.4	2.9	6.3	3.2	12.7	4.5	34.0	3.2
3–8 Sep 2021	YouTrend	802	5.3		15.4	28.0	10.5				3.9	7.8	6.4	5.3	11.3		6.2	54.5	12.6
23 Jun 2021	Tecnè	1,000	8.1		17.8	15.8	9.6				7.7	12.2	6.7	3.9	11.6		6.1	45.4	2.0
14–16 Jun 2021	Winpoll	800	13.5		19.0	16.2	2.2	1.7	2.0	0.5	7.3	10.9	6.7	—N/a	1.0	14.8	4.2	40.0	5.7
5 June 2016	Election result	-	7.6	32.2	11.6	9.7	DNP	DNP	DNP	12.0	9.6	1.2	DNP	15.0	DNP		1.0	-	1.9

== Results ==
Summary of the 2021 Naples City Council election results
Mayoral candidates	Votes	%	Leaders seats	Parties	Votes	%	Seats
Gaetano Manfredi	218,087	62.88	–	Democratic Party	39,904	12.20	6
Gaetano Manfredi	218,087	62.88	–	Manfredi List	32,451	9.92	5
Gaetano Manfredi	218,087	62.88	–	Five Star Movement	31,805	9.73	5
Gaetano Manfredi	218,087	62.88	–	Azzurri – We the South – Naples Alive	17,791	5.44	2
Gaetano Manfredi	218,087	62.88	–	Free Naples	15,053	4.60	2
Gaetano Manfredi	218,087	62.88	–	Us Campanians	13,164	4.03	2
Gaetano Manfredi	218,087	62.88	–	Solidary Naples	12,596	3.85	2
Gaetano Manfredi	218,087	62.88	–	Now Naples	12,307	3.76	1
Gaetano Manfredi	218,087	62.88	–	Green Europe	10,496	3.21	1
Gaetano Manfredi	218,087	62.88	–	Democratic Centre	9,800	3.00	1
Gaetano Manfredi	218,087	62.88	–	Moderates	8,408	2.57	1
Gaetano Manfredi	218,087	62.88	–	People and Community	6,006	1.84	0
Gaetano Manfredi	218,087	62.88	–	Democratic Republicans	5,646	1.76	0
Gaetano Manfredi	218,087	62.88	–	Total	215,427	65.88	28
Catello Maresca	75,891	21.88	1	Forza Italia	21,691	6.63	3
Catello Maresca	75,891	21.88	1	Brothers of Italy	14,404	4.41	1
Catello Maresca	75,891	21.88	1	Maresca for Mayor	9,175	2.81	1
Catello Maresca	75,891	21.88	1	Naples Capital (PdF – LSA – Others)	8,494	2.60	1
Catello Maresca	75,891	21.88	1	Cambiamo!	8,291	2.54	1
Catello Maresca	75,891	21.88	1	Us with Italy – Alliance of the Centre	3,066	0.94	0
Catello Maresca	75,891	21.88	1	Neapolitan Pride	2,605	0.80	0
Catello Maresca	75,891	21.88	1	European Liberal Party	572	0.17	0
Catello Maresca	75,891	21.88	1	Total	68,298	20.89	7
Antonio Bassolino	28,451	8.20	1	Bassolino for Naples	13,562	4.15	1
Antonio Bassolino	28,451	8.20	1	With Naples	4,097	1.25	0
Antonio Bassolino	28,451	8.20	1	Action	1,483	0.45	0
Antonio Bassolino	28,451	8.20	1	Naples is Naples	1,414	0.43	0
Antonio Bassolino	28,451	8.20	1	Gay Party	930	0.28	0
Antonio Bassolino	28,451	8.20	1	Total	21,486	6.57	1
Alessandra Clemente	19,338	5.58	1	Alessandra Clemente for Mayor	10,564	3.23	1
Alessandra Clemente	19,338	5.58	1	Power to the People	4,358	1.33	0
Alessandra Clemente	19,338	5.58	1	Naples 2030	2,450	0.75	0
Alessandra Clemente	19,338	5.58	1	Total	17,372	5.31	1
Matteo Brambilla	2,162	0.62	–	Naples on the Move	1,960	0.70	0
Giovanni Moscarella	1,810	0.52	–	3V Movement	1,516	0.46	0
Rossella Solombrino	1,078	0.31	–	August 24th Movement	921	0.28	0
Total	346,807	100.00	3		326,990	100.00	37
Total valid votes	346,807	94.66					
Blank or invalid ballots	19,567	5.34					
Turnout	366,374	47.17					
Eligible voters	776,751	100.00					
Source: Ministry of the Interior

== See also ==
- 2021 Italian local elections
