= Risorgimento Socialista =

Socialist Resurgence Risorgimento Socialista
- President: Vacant
- Coordinator: Franco Bartolomei
- Founded: 2015
- Ideology: Socialism; Marxism
- Political position: Left-wing
- National affiliation: Power to the People (2018); People's Union (2022)

Website
- www.risorgimentosocialista.it

Socialist Resurgence (Italian: Risorgimento Socialista; RS) is a socialist political party in Italy.

== History ==
RS was founded in 2015 as a party with a socialist standpoint, originating from the split of a left-wing faction of Riccardo Nencini's Italian Socialist Party.

On the occasion of the 2018 general elections, the party joined the Power to the People list, together with Communist Refoundation Party, Italian Communist Party, and other far-left parties and associations, under the leadership of Viola Carofalo. However, Power to the People scored 1.1% of the vote and elected no MPs.

In 2022, RS joined People's Union, the electoral list (which brings together Democracy and Autonomy, Communist Refoundation Party and Power to the People) created by Luigi de Magistris to participate in the general elections of the same year. On this occasion, the party's coordinator Franco Bartolomei is a candidate for the Senate in the single-member constituency "BAT–Murgia", in Apulia.

== Elections results ==
=== Italian Parliament ===
Election	Chamber of Deputies				Senate of the Republic			
Election	Votes	%	Seats	+/–	Votes	%	Seats	+/–
2018	Into PaP		0 / 630	New	Into PaP		0 / 315	New
2022	Into UP		0 / 400	0	Into UP		0 / 200	0

== Leadership ==
- President: Alberto Benzoni (2019–2026)
- Coordinator: Franco Bartolomei
