= Civil Revolution =

Civil Revolution Rivoluzione Civile
- President: Antonio Ingroia
- Founded: 29 December 2012
- Dissolved: 2 April 2013
- Headquarters: Via Marche 72 00187 Rome
- Ideology: Anti-corruption; Left-wing populism Internal factions: Communism; Green politics Hard Euroscepticism
- Political position: Left-wing
- Colours: Red, Orange

Civil Revolution (Italian: Rivoluzione Civile, RC) was a left-wing coalition of political parties in Italy.

The coalition was headed by Antonio Ingroia, a former anti-mafia prosecutor of Palermo from 1992 to 2012 and then director of a UN investigation into illegal drug trade in Guatemala in 2012.

The foundation of RC was preceded by the manifesto Io ci sto, presented by Ingroia on 21 December in Rome. Among the signatories of this appeal were Franco Battiato, Fiorella Mannoia, Luigi de Magistris, Leoluca Orlando, Milly Moratti, Massimiliano Bruno, Max Paiella, Sabina Guzzanti, Vauro and Enrico Fierro. The coalition had an anti-corruption platform.

In the 2013 general election the party obtained 2.2% of the vote, returning no seats in the Italian Parliament.

Soon after RC was dissolved on 2 April 2013, Ingroia launched a new party named Civil Action (Italian: Azione Civile).

== Overview ==
Civil Revolution was founded on 29 December 2012 in Rome by Ingroia and the following parties:

Party	Ideology	Leader
Italy of Values (IdV)	Anti-corruption	Antonio Di Pietro
Communist Refoundation Party (PRC)	Communism	Paolo Ferrero
Party of Italian Communists (PdCI)	Communism	Oliviero Diliberto
Federation of the Greens (FdV)	Green politics	Angelo Bonelli
The Network 2018 (LR2018)	Anti-corruption	Leoluca Orlando
Orange Movement (MA)	Anti-corruption	Luigi de Magistris

Subsequently, the following parties and organizations joined RC:

- Red Diaries (Agende Rosse - Anti-mafia politics), led by Salvatore Borsellino;
- We Can Change (Cambiare Si Può, CSP - Left-wing appeal), led by Livio Pepino, Marco Revelli and Chiara Sasso;
- Ecologists and Civic Networks (Ecologisti e Reti Civiche - Green coalition), led by Bonelli and Mary Luppino, including:
  - Federation of the Greens (Federazione dei Verdi);
  - We Have a Dream (Abbiamo un Sogno);
  - Ecologist Constituent Assembly (Costituente Ecologista);
  - Mayors of Good Administration (Sindaci della Buona Amministrazione);
- New Action Party (Nuovo Partito d'Azione, NPA - Social liberalism), led by Giuseppe Antonio Quartana;
- Purple People (Popolo Viola - Activism), led by Massimo Malerba.
- Party of the South (Partito del Sud - Southernism), led by Beppe De Santis.

== Electoral results ==
=== Italian Parliament ===
Election	Leader	Chamber of Deputies				Senate of the Republic			
Election	Leader	Votes	%	Seats	+/–	Votes	%	Seats	+/–
2013	Antonio Ingroia	765,172	2.25	0 / 630	New	549,987	1.79	0 / 315	New

== Leadership ==
- President: Antonio Ingroia (2012–2013)
