= Orange Movement =

Orange Movement Movimento Arancione
- Leaders: Luigi de Magistris
- Founded: 2012
- Dissolved: 2017
- Split from: Italy of Values
- Merged into: Democracy and Autonomy
- Ideology: Anti-corrupution; Populism
- Political position: Left-wing
- National affiliation: Civil Revolution (2013)
- Colours: Orange

Website
- http://www.movimentoarancione.com/

The Orange Movement (Movimento Arancione, MA) was a political party in Italy.

It was launched on 12 December 2012 by Luigi de Magistris, mayor of Naples and until then member of Italy of Values (IdV). The founding convention of the party was attended by Antonio Ingroia (by telephone) and the leaders of the Communist Refoundation Party, the Party of Italian Communists and the Federation of the Greens.
