= Campo largo (politics) =

Campo largo (literally "broad field") is a term used in Italian political and journalistic discourse to describe a possible area of centre-left electoral alliances, intended to bring together the main centre-left and left-wing political forces and, on occasion, centrist parties. The expression, documented as early as 2005, first gained widespread currency during Enrico Letta's leadership of the Democratic Party (PD) between 2021 and 2022. It was subsequently used to describe electoral alliances among parties opposed to centre-right governments.

The political area associated with these potential electoral alliances is centred primarily on the Democratic Party, the Five Star Movement (M5S) and the Greens and Left Alliance (AVS). Depending on the political context, it may also include centrist, socialist and civic political groups. Its composition is therefore not fixed but fluid, varying according to electoral contests and agreements between the parties involved.

== History and composition ==
=== Origins and evolution of the term ===
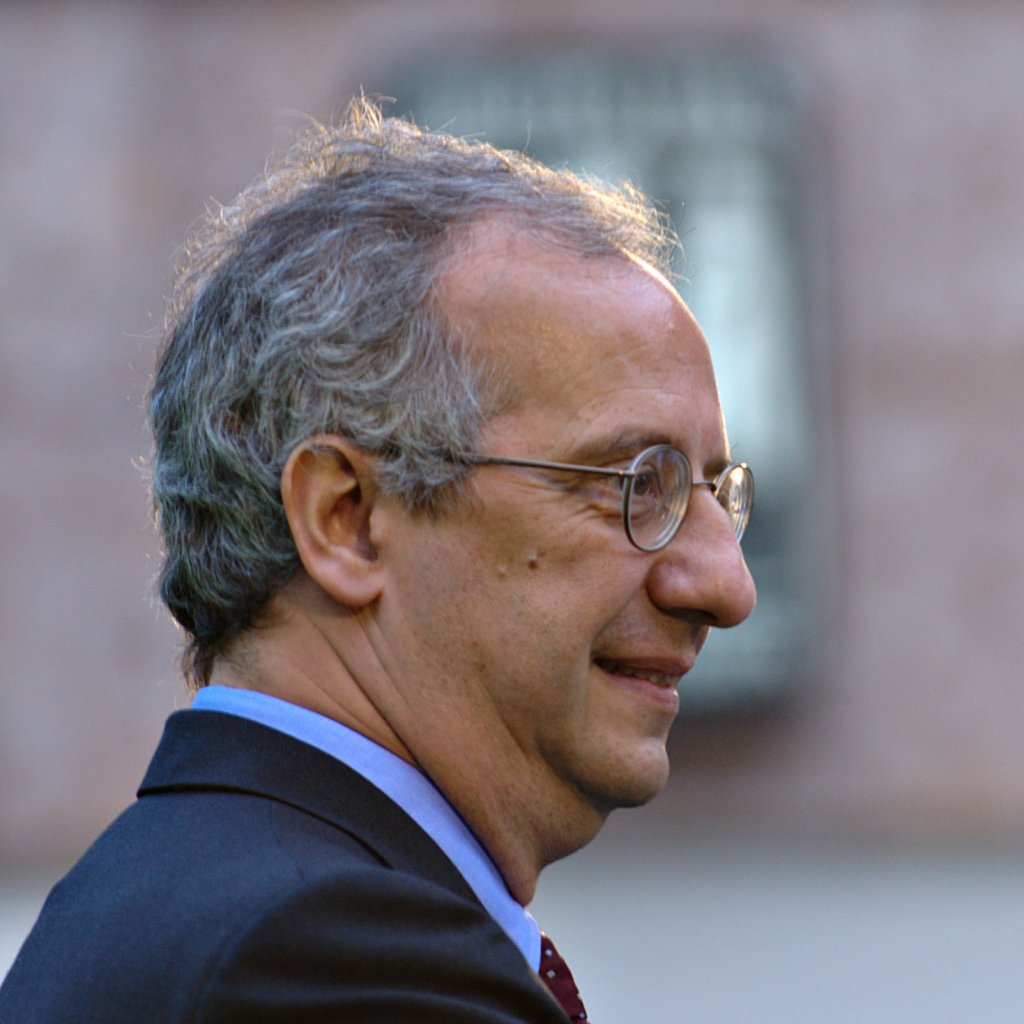
The earliest documented use of the term campo largo in Italian political discourse dates to a statement by Walter Veltroni in 2005.

The expression campo largo has been documented in Italian political language since at least 20 October 2005, when Walter Veltroni used it in an interview with la Repubblica to refer to the construction of a centre-left coalition capable of bringing together different political and cultural traditions. In 2022, linguist Michele Cortelazzo identified this statement as an anticipation of the expression's subsequent use. The term returned to political debate in the summer of 2010 in connection with a project promoted by Goffredo Bettini to broaden the centre-left coalition. In November 2016, Massimo Bordin, writing in Il Foglio, observed that the term had also been taken up by Dario Franceschini in discussions concerning the reconstruction of an electoral coalition around the Democratic Party. It was used again in 2017 in connection with the initiatives of the Progressive Camp (Campo Progressista), a political movement promoted by Giuliano Pisapia ahead of the 2018 Italian general election.

According to Cortelazzo's reconstruction, the expression's use in Italian politics has historically been associated primarily with centre-left politicians linked in various ways to Romano Prodi, including Veltroni, Bettini and Letta. Although attributing the term's origin to Letta is chronologically inaccurate, this association reflects the continuity between his political environment and the circles in which the expression initially circulated.

During the leadership of Enrico Letta, who became secretary of the Democratic Party in March 2021, the term acquired renewed prominence in reference to a project aimed at expanding the centre-left alliance to include both centrist parties, such as Action and Italia Viva, and the Five Star Movement. The objective was to build an electoral coalition capable of competing with the centre-right. Letta, who had already expressed the need to broaden the left's electoral horizon in 2019, explicitly adopted the expression campo largo in 2021, making it one of the central elements of his political strategy. In an interview published by ANSA on 16 March 2021, the Democratic Party secretary envisaged a centre-left alliance including the Five Star Movement. On 27 June 2022, commenting on the results of the local elections, he claimed that the successes achieved reflected the effectiveness of the campo largo strategy.

Over time, the meaning of the expression changed somewhat. By 2024, campo largo was predominantly used to describe electoral agreements between the PD, M5S and AVS, while the expression campo larghissimo ("very broad field") was mainly employed for coalitions intended to include centrist political forces as well. Meanwhile, Giuseppe Conte and other representatives of the Five Star Movement began using the expression campo giusto ("right field"), which had already appeared in the party's political communication during the 2022 electoral campaign. The contrast between the two expressions emerged following the 2024 Sardinian regional election and the victory of Alessandra Todde.

More generally, the use of the word campo ("field") forms part of the evolution of the vocabulary of Italian political coalitions. From the 1990s onwards, the term polo ("pole") had become established in political discourse. Compared with the earlier expression, however, campo is characterised by its vagueness in describing the strength of the relationships between the political actors involved.

=== Composition and political characteristics ===
In Italian political debate during the second half of the 2020s, the expression has generally been associated with attempts to build an alliance between the PD, M5S and AVS, open, depending on the circumstances, to other progressive and centrist political groups. Nevertheless, it does not identify a permanent coalition, as the various alliances have adopted different configurations in the regional and municipal elections in which they have participated.

Paolo Pombeni, in an analysis published in the journal Il Mulino in December 2025, placed the campo largo within the evolution of the Italian party system towards a form of polarized pluralism. In this interpretation, the Democratic Party, AVS and M5S constitute a left-wing political grouping in which each party retains its own organisational and electoral identity and from which no undisputed common leadership has emerged. The formation of electoral alliances does not necessarily encourage greater integration among the parties involved. A separate study by Cecilia Biancalana and Marta Gallina described the campo largo as a political project which, during 2025, had failed to consolidate into a fully coherent governing alternative because of tensions between the PD and M5S concerning leadership and policy priorities.

In the political debate of 2026, the possible alliances associated with the campo largo continued to be affected both by discussions concerning the coalition's potential expansion to centrist parties, particularly Italia Viva, and by debates over how to select a common candidate for prime minister, including the possibility of holding primary elections.

== Local electoral activity ==
The election of Roberto Fico as president of Campania in 2025 highlighted both the opportunities and the contradictions of the campo largo.

The campo largo approach has found its principal applications in regional elections and municipal elections across Italy.

An important precedent was the 2021 Naples municipal election, in which a coalition comprising the Democratic Party, the Five Star Movement, other left-wing political groups and centrist parties supported the candidacy of Gaetano Manfredi. Manfredi won 62.9% of the vote in the first round, providing a possible political model for other local and national electoral contests.

The approach was also adopted in the 2024 Sardinian regional election, won by Alessandra Todde, a candidate supported by the Five Star Movement and the Democratic Party alongside other left-wing and centrist political forces. The election helped draw greater media attention to the campo largo and to the different interpretations of the alliance project. According to Cortelazzo, during the 2024 regional elections the expression became increasingly widespread, being applied to opposition coalitions whose composition varied across different regions.

In 2025, the coalition project played a significant role in the 2025 Campania regional election, which resulted in the election of Roberto Fico. The contest attracted particular attention because of the difficulties in coordinating the Five Star Movement, the centre-left parties and the centrist political forces previously associated with the regional administration of Vincenzo De Luca.

Local electoral experiences have therefore demonstrated different configurations of the campo largo, both in terms of the parties involved and the relationships between their respective leaders. The 2025 elections confirmed the tendency of Italian political parties to organise themselves into opposing electoral blocs while retaining considerable autonomy. Electoral results were also influenced by the local political presence of candidates and the specific characteristics of regional political systems.

== Bibliography ==
- Biancalana, Cecilia; Gallina, Marta (2026). "Italy: Political developments and data in 2025: stable at the top, conflictual underneath". Political Data Yearbook: 1–11. doi:10.1017/S204788442610007X.
- Brancaccio, Luciano; Fruncillo, Domenico (2025). "Il laboratorio campano per il «campo largo» alla prova delle regionali 2025". Regional Studies and Local Development (in Italian). 6 (2): 1–22. doi:10.25430/pupj-RSLD-2025-2-9.
- Cortelazzo, Michele A. (2024). La lingua della neopolitica: Come parlano i leader (in Italian). Treccani Libri. ISBN 9788812011407.
