= Green Front =

Italian political party

Green Front Fronte Verde
- President: Vincenzo Galizia
- Founded: 21 December 2006
- Headquarters: Via degli Scipioni, Rome
- Newspaper: RobinHoodpost
- Youth wing: Green Front Young
- Ideology: Green politics Anti-capitalism; Anti-globalization; Direct democracy
- National affiliation: PBC (2008); Freedom (2024)
- Colors: Dark Green
- Chamber of Deputies: 0 / 400
- Senate: 0 / 200
- European Parliament: 0 / 76
- Regional Councils: 0 / 896

Website
- www.fronteverde.net

The Green Front (Italian: Fronte Verde, FV), whose complete name is Green Front – Independent Ecologists (Italian: Fronte Verde – Ecologisti Indipendenti, FVEI), is a green political party in Italy led by Vincenzo Galizia, a former leader of the National Youth (the youth wing of the far-right Tricolour Flame party). The name of the party's newspaper (RobinHoodPost) refers to the legendary heroic outlaw Robin Hood. The symbol of the party is a stylized archer similar to Robin Hood.

The Green Front does not declare itself to be of right-wing nor left-wing, and declares to be inspired "by a spiritual conception of life". The party is in favor of direct democracy, anti-nuclear, anti-capitalist, anti-globalization, and the self-determination of the peoples. The party is twinned with the Ecology at the Centre (ÉAC) in France.

== History ==
At the 2008 Italian general election, the Green Front presented its symbol, declaring to run without allying with other parties. The party's president invited his electors to vote the For the Common Good electoral list, led by Stefano Montanari and former senator Fernando Rossi. The list got 0.33% of the vote. At the 2009 European Parliament election in Italy, the party stipulated an agreement with the Liberal Democrats of Daniela Melchiorre; the list obtained 0.23% of the votes. In March 2009, the National Assembly held in Rome changed the party's name into Green Front – Independent Ecologists and re-elected unanimously Galizia as national president.

In the 2013 Lazio regional election, the Green Front supported the centre-right coalition candidate Francesco Storace. The party got 0.07% of the votes, present only in the Frosinone constituency where it took 0.76% while Storace was defeated by the centre-left coalition candidate Zingaretti. At the 2014 European Parliament election in Italy, the Green Front supported the candidates of the Northern League (LN).

In the 2019 European election, the Green Front supported two candidates of the leftist Green Europe (EV) electoral list (Giuliana Farinaro and Elvira Maria Vernengo). After the newspaper Il Foglio reported that EV was supported by a party led by a former far-right politician, Giuseppe Civati suspended his election campaign. In the 2020 Marche regional election, the Green Front entered the civic list Movimento per le Marche, supporting the centre-right coalition presidential candidate Francesco Acquaroli, who won the election; the list connected to the Green Front did not elect any regional councillors as it obtained 0.9% of the votes. In the 2024 European Parliament election in Italy, the Green Front was part of the Freedom coalition. The list did not elect any candidates as it obtained 1.22% of the votes.

== Leadership ==
- President: Vincenzo Galizia (2006–present)

== Election results ==
=== Italian Parliament ===
Election	Leader	Chamber of Deputies				Senate of the Republic			
Election	Leader	Votes	%	Seats	+/–	Votes	%	Seats	+/–
2008	Vincenzo Galizia	Into PBC		0 / 630	New	Into PBC		0 / 315	New

=== European Parliament ===
Election	Leader	Votes	%	Seats	+/–	EP Group
2024	Vincenzo Galizia	Into Freedom		0 / 76	New	–
