= Democracy and Autonomy =

Italian political party

Democracy and Autonomy Democrazia e Autonomia
- President: Luigi De Magistris
- Secretary: Claudio de Magistris
- Founded: 2015 (association); 2017 (political party)
- Dissolved: 2024 (de facto)
- Preceded by: Orange Movement
- Headquarters: Via Toledo, 156; 80134 Naples
- Ideology: Left-wing populism
- Political position: Left-wing
- National affiliation: People's Union (2022–2024)
- Chamber of Deputies: 0 / 400
- Senate: 0 / 200
- European Parliament: 0 / 76
- Naples City Council: 0 / 40

Website
- www.dem-a.it

Democracy and Autonomy (Italian: Democrazia e Autonomia; DemA) was a political party in Italy, based in Campania. Its founder and leader was Luigi de Magistris, former mayor of Naples and former MEP for Italy of Values.

== History ==
DemA was launched as an association by Mayor of Naples, Luigi de Magistris, and his associates in 2015.

In the Naples municipal election DemA (7.6%) was among the lists which supported Luigi de Magistris re-election as mayor (42.8% in the first round and 66.9% in the run-off). Its local partners were Naples in Common to the Left (a joint list of Italian Left, Possible, The Other Europe, the Communist Refoundation Party, the Italian Communist Party and Green Italia), the Federation of the Greens, the Democratic Republicans, Italy of Values, the Party of the South and six civic lists.

In December 2018, De Magistris launched a new political coalition of left-wing political organizations, with the intention of running in the 2019 European election.
