= Ecologists and Civic Networks =

Ecologists and Civic Networks Ecologisti e Reti Civiche
- Founded: November 2011
- Dissolved: 4 May 2013
- Ideology: Green politics

Ecologists and Civic Networks (Italian: Ecologisti e Reti Civiche) was a green coalition of parties in Italy.

Modelled on the French Europe Ecology – The Greens, the coalition was launched in November 2011. Its core was composed by the Federation of the Greens. According to Angelo Bonelli, the Green leader of the time, the new political force would take inspiration also from the German Grünen and would be open to the contribution of movements and associations, notably including Beppe Grillo's Five Star Movement. Other than the Greens, participants of the new political force included, among others, Massimo Scalia (a former leading Green), Bruno Mellano (president of the Italian Radicals), movie maker Mario Monicelli, writer Dacia Maraini, geologist Mario Tozzi and comedian Giobbe Covatta.

The coalition was disbanded in May 2013, but some of its members joined the Greens. These included Covatta, who would go on to become spokesman of the party in November 2015, succeeding to Bonelli.
