= Anticapitalist Left (Italy) =

Italian political party

Anticapitalist Left Sinistra Anticapitalista
- Leader: Franco Turigliatto
- Founded: 22 September 2013
- Preceded by: Critical Left
- Headquarters: Via G. Modena, 90/A Rome
- Newspaper: L'Anticapitalista
- Ideology: Communism; Marxism; Trotskyism; Eco-socialism; Socialist feminism
- Political position: Far-left
- International affiliation: Fourth International

Website
- anticapitalista.org

Anticapitalist Left (Sinistra Anticapitalista, SA) is a small far-left political party in Italy, led by Franco Turigliatto.

== History ==
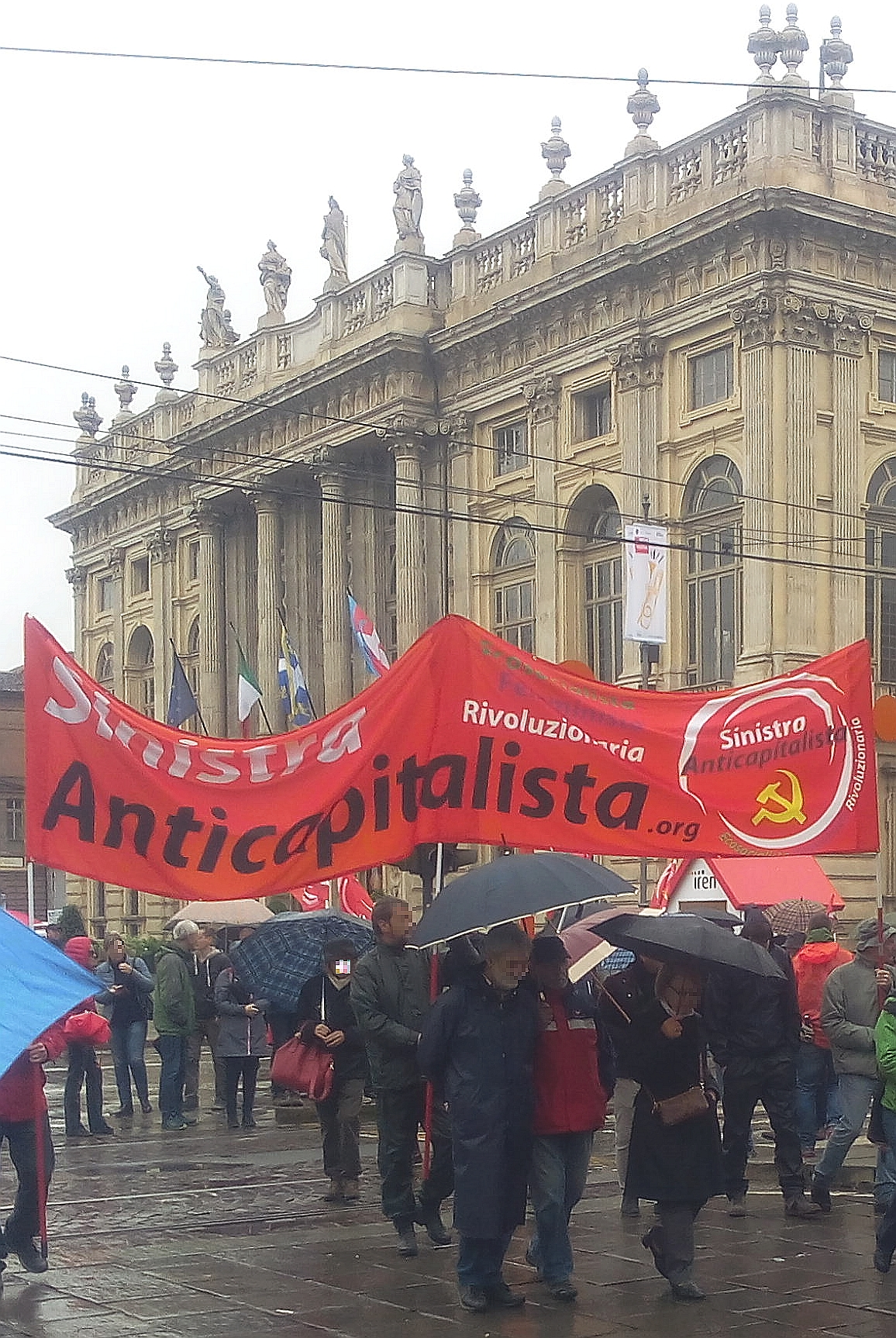
Members of Anticapitalist Left in 2016

Following the dissolution of Critical Left (SC) in 2013, Franco Turigliatto, Antonio Moscato, and other militants of the former SC, founded a new party, Anticapitalist Left. The new organization "promotes the elaboration and implementation of a revolutionary communist, feminist, environmentalist, and libertarian political program". In anticipation of the Italian election of 2018 and after having started a dialogue with the Workers' Communist Party, SA decided to join Power to the People. On 4 October, the Anticapitalist Left decided to abandon the project, deciding that working with former OPG and Eurostop members to give life to a new party would have distorted the original project of a common, open, pluralist and inclusive front. At its second national congress, held in February 2019, the Anticapitalist Left became the Italian section of the Fourth International.

== Electoral results ==
=== Italian Parliament ===
Election	Leader	Chamber of Deputies				Senate of the Republic			
Election	Leader	Votes	%	Seats	+/–	Votes	%	Seats	+/–
2018	Franco Turigliatto	Into PaP		0 / 630	New	Into PaP		0 / 315	New
