= Paolo Cento =

Italian politician

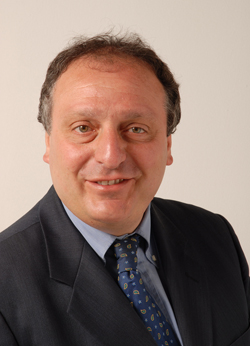

Member of the Chamber of Deputies
- In office 9 May 1996 – 28 April 2008
- Constituency: Lazio 1 (1996-2001); Emilia-Romagna (2001-2008)

Personal details
- Born: 10 July 1962 (age 64) Rome, Italy
- Party: FdV (1990–2009); SEL (2009–2016); SI (2016–2021)
- Education: Sapienza University of Rome
- Profession: Politician

Paolo Cento (born 10 July 1962) is an Italian politician.

== Biography ==
Paolo Cento began his political commitment in the Catholic groups and in the AGESCI.

In 1985 he was among the founders of the Greens, with whom he was elected municipal (1985–1989) and provincial councilor (1990–1994) in Rome; he also served as assessor for the environment of Rome from 1994 to 1995. From 1995 to 1996 he was regional councilor of Lazio.

In the political elections of 1996 he was elected to the Chamber of Deputies, in the Lazio 1 constituency, defeating the candidate for the Pole for Freedoms Gianni Alemanno. He was re-elected also in 2001 and 2006.

In 2004 he publicly supported the terrorist Cesare Battisti, asking for his immediate release after being arrested by the French police.

He was appointed to the Undersecretary of State for Economy and Finance in the second Prodi government.

He received the position of Governor for Italy of IFAD (International Fund for Agricultural Development). He also established the Accounting and Environmental Accounting Commission of which he was president at the Ministry of Economy and Finance.

Cento was not re-elected Deputy in 2008, because of the disappointing result of the Rainbow Left list.

In 2009 Cento was expelled from the Federation of the Greens, so he founded, along with Grazia Francescato, the Ecologists Association, to then join Left Ecology Freedom later.
