= For the Common Good =

Italian political party

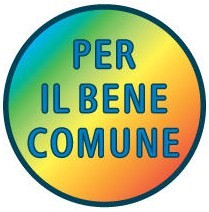
For the Common Good's logo

For the Common Good (Per il Bene Comune, PBC) was a left-wing electoral list in Italy. Its leader was Stefano Montanari.

The list, that ran in the 2008 general election, was supported by:

- Citizens' Political Movement (Movimento Politico dei Cittadini) — a left-wing populist party formed by senator Fernando Rossi, a former member of the Party of Italian Communists, in September 2007;
- Federation of Liberal Democrats (Federazione dei Liberaldemocratici) — a social-liberal party formed by Marco Marsili in October 2003;
- Humanist Party (Partito Umanista) — a member party of the Humanist Movement;
- Green Front (Fronte Verde) — a green party led by Vincenzo Galizia, former leader of the youth wing of the Tricolour Flame party.

In the 2008 general election the list won 0.33% of the vote (119.569 votes) for the Chamber of Deputies and 0.32% (105.827) for the Senate, despite being present only in some constituencies, and no seats.
