= People's Union (Italy) =

Left-wing political alliance in Italy

People's Union Unione Popolare
- Leader: Luigi de Magistris
- Founded: 9 July 2022
- Dissolved: Summer 2024 (de facto)
- Ideology: Left-wing populism Socialism; Factions: Democratic socialism Communism
- Political position: Left-wing to far-left

Website
- unionepopolare.blog

The People's Union (Italian: Unione Popolare, UP) was a left-wing political alliance in Italy launched on 9 July 2022 by Luigi de Magistris.

== History ==
=== Background ===
During a national assembly of Democracy and Autonomy (DemA) in January 2022, Luigi de Magistris, party leader and former Mayor of Naples, announced his intention to create a new coalition of left-wing parties, starting from his own party. In February, four deputies founded a sub-group at the Chamber of Deputies called "ManifestA". All of them had been elected in the 2018 general election for the Five Star Movement, a big-tent populist party, and then left the party and joined either Power to the People (PaP) or Communist Refoundation Party (PRC).

In April, at the Chamber of Deputies, de Magistris and the four deputies of ManifestA, held a joint conference to launch a coalition of parties opposed to the Russo-Ukrainian war and Mario Draghi's government for the next general election, initially scheduled to be held in 2023. He also stated that the group would not join the centre-left coalition led by the Democratic Party.

In July, De Magistris organised an assembly named "Towards the People's Union", which was attended also by PaP, the PRC, ManifestA and other groups.

The alliance participated in the 2022 general election, receiving over 400,000 votes and zero seats.

In December, the 4th October Movement, a breakaway-party from the Five Star Movement, announced they will join the UP, along with their two regional councillors in Piedmont.

In the run-up of the 2024 European Parliament election some of the components of UP joined Peace Land Dignity, a pacifist electoral list proposed by journalist Michele Santoro, while others chose to support some individual candidacies in the Green and Left Alliance lists. In March 2024 de Magistris, after refusing to stand as a candidate in the upcoming election, left UP's leadership altogether.

== Composition ==
=== Founding member parties ===
Party	Main ideology	Leader(s)
Democracy and Autonomy (DemA)	Left-wing populism	Luigi de Magistris
Communist Refoundation Party (PRC)	Communism	Maurizio Acerbo
Power to the People (PaP)	Left-wing populism	Giuliano Granato, Marta Collot
ManifestA	Communism	None
Risorgimento Socialista (RS)	Socialism	Franco Bartolomei
Party of the South (PdS)	Regionalism	Natale Cuccurese

=== Further members ===
Party	Main ideology	Leader(s)	Joined
October 4th Movement	Environmentalism	Francesca Frediani	16 December 2022

== Electoral results ==
=== Italian Parliament ===
Election	Leader	Chamber of Deputies				Senate of the Republic			
Election	Leader	Votes	%	Seats	+/–	Votes	%	Seats	+/–
2022	Luigi de Magistris	402,964	1.43	0 / 400	New	374,051	1.36	0 / 200	New

=== Regional Councils ===
Region	Election year	Votes	%	Seats	+/−
Trentino	2023	1,088 (23rd)	0.47	0 / 35	New
Lombardy	2023	39,913 (11th)	1.4	0 / 80	New
Lazio	2023	10,289 (14th)	0.7	0 / 51	New
