= Luana Zanella =

Italian politician

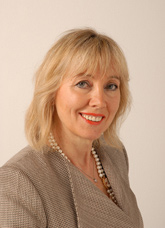

Member of the Chamber of Deputies
- Incumbent
- Assumed office 13 October 2022
- Constituency: Veneto 2
- In office 30 May 2001 – 28 April 2008
- Constituency: Venice-Mestre (2001-2006); Veneto 2 (2006-2008)

Personal details
- Born: 4 October 1950 (age 76) Venice, Italy
- Party: EV (since 2021)
- Other political affiliations: Greens (until 2021)
- Education: University of Padua
- Profession: Teacher

Luana Zanella (born 4 October 1950 in Venice) is an Italian teacher and politician from Green Europe.

== Biography ==
Born on October 4, 1950, in Venice, she currently resides in Mestre; she is married with two children. She holds a degree in political science from the University of Padua and a specialization in labor law from the University of Trieste.

She taught law and economics in high schools in Trieste and Venice, focusing on educational innovation and local research. Active in the women’s movement and environmental organizations, she entered institutional politics in the early 1990s, holding various positions over the years in the Venice municipal administration: district president from 1994 to 1997, president of the city council from 1997 to 2000, city councilor responsible for social policies and women’s rights from 2000 to 2001, and councilor responsible for Production (economics), community and international relations, youth policies, and the Peace Center from 2006 to 2010.
