= Beatrice Brignone =

Italian politician (born 1978)

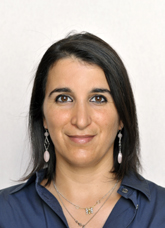

Member of the Chamber of Deputies
- In office 23 July 2015 – 23 March 2018

Personal details
- Born: 31 January 1978 (age 48) Senigallia, Italy
- Party: PD (2009-2015); Possible (since 2015)
- Education: University of Bologna
- Occupation: Politician

Beatrice Brignone (born 31 January 1978) is an Italian politician, leader of Possible from 2018 to 2024 and a member of the Italian Chamber of Deputies from 2015 to 2018.

== Biography ==
Graduated in Law at the University of Bologna, Brignone began her political career in 2009 joining the Democratic Party, supporting Ignazio Marino first and Giuseppe Civati later.

Brignone was a leading promoter of the 2011 popular referendums.

She ran for the Chamber of Deputies at the 2013 election, but was the first of the unelected. She managed to enter Parliament in July 2015, when former Prime Minister Enrico Letta resigned from the Chamber of Deputies. Meanwhile, she had left the Democratic Party, after having criticized Matteo Renzi's policies and joined Giuseppe Civati's Possible.

Brignone ran once again for the Chamber of Deputies during the 2018 election with the left-wing coalition Free and Equal, but failed to win. After Civati's resignation, Brignone was elected the new Secretary of Possible.
