= Bartolomeo Pepe =

Italian politician (1962–2021)

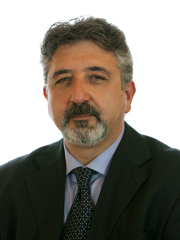
- Pepe in 2013

Member of the Senate of the Republic of Italy
- In office 15 March 2013 – 22 March 2018

Personal details
- Born: 3 November 1962 Naples, Italy
- Died: 23 December 2021 (aged 59) Naples, Italy
- Party: M5S (2013–2014); FdV (2015); Independent (2018–2021)

Bartolomeo Pepe (3 November 1962 – 23 December 2021) was an Italian politician.

== Biography ==
A member of the Five Star Movement and then the Federation of the Greens, he served in the Senate of the Republic from 2013 to 2018.

An avowed anti-vaxxer, Pepe vocally opposed the mandatory vaccination of schoolchildren in Italy, supported the idea of a link between vaccines and autism, and spread a number of conspiracy theories, such as the ones regarding chemtrails. After the outbreak of the COVID-19 pandemic, he called the media coverage and containment measures "ridiculous hysteria" and opposed the subsequent vaccination campaign. He died from COVID-19 on 23 December 2021, at the age of 59.
