= Possible (political party) =

Italian political party

Possible Possibile
- Abbreviation: Pos
- Secretary: Francesca Druetti
- Founded: 21 June 2015
- Split from: Democratic Party
- Headquarters: Via Giambattista Balbis, 13 Turin
- Membership (2015): ▲4,773
- Ideology: Social democracy Environmentalism; Feminism
- Political position: Left-wing
- National affiliation: Free and Equal (2018); Green Europe (2019); Greens and Left Alliance (2022–2024)
- European Parliament group: Progressive Alliance of Socialists and Democrats (2015–2019)
- Colours: Red
- Chamber of Deputies: 0 / 400
- Senate: 0 / 200
- European Parliament: 0 / 76
- Regional Councils: 1 / 896

Website
- possibile.com

Possible (Italian: Possibile, Pos) is a left-wing political party in Italy, launched in Rome on 21 June 2015. The party's founder is Giuseppe Civati, a former prominent member of the Democratic Party (PD). Possible's progressive platform is a mixture of social democracy, democratic socialism, green politics, feminism, and elements of participatory democracy.

Possible's logo, including an equals sign, refers to a fundamental issue for the party, equality, inflected in multiple fields such as the economy, conflict of interest, separation of powers, anti-sexism, LGBTI+ rights, and immigration. In late 2017, the party was a founding member of Free and Equal (LeU), a left-wing joint list for the 2018 Italian general election, while from 2022 to 2024 was part of the Greens and Left Alliance (AVS) for the 2022 Italian general election.

== History ==
In May 2015, after months of tensions with Prime Minister of Italy and party secretary Matteo Renzi, Civati chose to leave the PD. Civati, who had lost a bid to become leader of the party to Renzi in 2013, had long accused the Prime Minister of being a right-winger, moving the PD to the right or toward a centrist "party of the nation". Civati followed Luca Pastorino, a member of the Chamber of Deputies who was running, with Civati's support, for President in the 2015 Ligurian election and was instrumental in the defeat of the official Democratic candidate. Civati and Pastorino were joined by Elly Schlein, a member of the European Parliament sitting in the Socialists and Democrats' Group, and two more deputies, Andrea Maestri and Beatrice Brignone.

At Possible's launch, Civati explained that it was intended to "have minimum bureaucracy, and membership will be light, participatory, horizontal" and aimed at unifying all the parties, groups and individuals to the left of the PD, including among others Sergio Cofferati, Stefano Fassina, Nichi Vendola's Left Ecology Freedom (SEL), Maurizio Landini's Social Coalition, the Greens, and other environmentalists, in a single party, with a potential support around 10% of the vote. Also representatives of the Italian Radicals, Green Italia, the Communist Refoundation Party, Free Alternative (AL) and Italy Work in Progress (the latter two splinter groups from the Five Star Movement, M5S) showed up at Possible's first convention in Rome.

In the run-up of the party's second convention, to be held in July in Florence, some media hinted that five deputies who had left the M5S, four of whom affiliated to AL and one to SEL, and four senators, including the two of Italy Work in Progress, were on the verge of joining Possible, which was thus close to the formation of a group in the Senate of the Republic. In the meantime, while being open to a joint party with Civati, the two senators of Italy Work in Progress joined The Other Europe.

As of November 2015, Possible parted ways with most left-wing splinters of the PD, who had launched Future to the Left and joined Italian Left (SI), along with SEL and some left-wing splinters of the M5S. For his part, Civati looked interested in organising his party more "outside" than "inside the [political] palace". Consequently, Possible joined forces with AL, which was active also at the grassroots' level, and formed a joint sub-group within the Mixed Group of the Chamber. Shortly after, one deputy of AL, Toni Matarrelli, directly joined Possible, becoming its fifth deputy.

In January 2016, Civati was elected secretary of the party with 93.2% of the vote by party members. Between February and March 2017, Mattarelli left the party to join the Democratic and Progressive Movement (MDP), along with splinters from the PD and SI, while Possible chose to sever its ties with AL and team up with SI instead, by forming a joint group in the Chamber. In December 2017, Possible was a founding member, along with the MDP and SI, of Free and Equal (LeU), the left-wing joint list for the 2018 Italian general election, which chose the president of the Senate of the Republic and former anti-Mafia prosecutor Pietro Grasso as its leader and candidate for Prime Minister. In March 2018, following the electoral result below expectations, Civati resigned from secretary. In May Brignone was elected to replace him with 73.9% of the vote by party members, prevailing over David Tozzo with 26.1%. Subsequently, the party quit from LeU, while Tozzo left Possible to remain in LeU.

In the run-up to the 2019 European Parliament election in Italy, the party formed, along with the Federation of the Greens and Green Italia, Green Europe (EV). In the run-up of the 2022 Italian general election, the party joined the Greens and Left Alliance (AVS), earlier formed by SI and EV. The party was not accepted within AVS for the 2024 European Parliament election in Italy and chose not to participate. In May 2024, Francesca Druetti was elected new secretary of the party, replacing Brignone.

== Ideology ==
The party, a strong supporter of secularism, calls for a new plan on civil rights (including same-sex marriage, LGBT adoption, legalisation of cannabis and euthanasia), opposes austerity policies while supporting redistributive ones aimed at a more egalitarian society, and is a vocal proponent of environmentalism. Civati, who describes himself both as a social democrat and a liberal, or more precisely a "left-wing liberal", is also known for his stance for a more competitive free market.

Possible's logo, including an equals sign, refers to a fundamental issue for the party, equality, inflected in multiple fields such as the economy, conflict of interest, separation of powers, anti-sexism, LGBT rights, and immigration. The party's name is reminiscent of the slogan "Yes We Can", used by Barack Obama during the 2008 Democratic Party presidential primaries, "The party of possibilities", title of the motion supporting Civati in the 2013 Democratic Party leadership election, and Podemos, a kin political party in Spain.

== Election results ==
=== Italian Parliament ===
Election	Leader	Chamber of Deputies					Senate of the Republic				
Election	Leader	Votes	%	Seats	+/–	Position	Votes	%	Seats	+/–	Position
2018	Giuseppe Civati	Into LeU		1 / 630	New	6th	Into LeU		0 / 315	New	6th
2022	Beatrice Brignone	Into AVS		0 / 400	▼1	7th	Into AVS		0 / 200	0	7th

=== European Parliament ===
Election	Leader	Votes	%	Seats	+/–	EP Group
2019	Beatrice Brignone	Into EV		0 / 76	New	–

== Leadership ==
- Secretary: Giuseppe Civati (2015–2018), Beatrice Brignone (2018–2024), Francesca Druetti (2024–present)
- Party Leader in the Chamber of Deputies: Giuseppe Civati (2015–2018), Luca Pastorino (2018)
- Party Leader in the European Parliament: Elly Schlein (2015–2019)

== See also ==
- List of political parties in Italy
