= Franco Turigliatto =

Italian politician (born 1946)

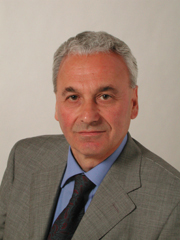

Member of the Senate
- In office 28 April 2006 – 28 April 2008
- Constituency: Piedmont

Personal details
- Born: 13 December 1946 (age 79) Rivara, Italy
- Party: DP (1989–1991); PRC (1991–2007); SC (2007–2013); SA (2013–present)
- Profession: Politician

Franco Turigliatto (born 13 December 1946 in Rivara, Piedmont) is an Italian politician.

== Biography ==
Franco Turigliatto began in 1966 his political militancy in Mario Capanna's Student Movement, with the occupation of Palazzo Campana in Turin. In 1969 he joined the Fourth International. With Livio Maitan he led the Lega Comunista Rivoluzionaria (Revolutionary Communist League) until 1989, when this group merged into Proletarian Democracy. In 1991 he took part in the construction of the Communist Refoundation Party. Turigliatto became a member of the national leadership and leader of an internal minority of the PRC, Red Flag, led by Maitan. As a member of the National Direction of PRC he worked for several years, within the Labor Department, of the Large Factory division, closely following the crisis of FIAT and going daily to the gates of the Mirafiori factories in Turin.

In 2006 Turigliatto was elected to the Senate and as member of PRC, it was part of the majority that supported the Prodi II Cabinet. On 21 February 2007 he didn't participate together with the PdCI's Senator Fernando Rossi to the vote on the motion by Foreign Minister D'Alema regarding the Government's foreign policy. On 1 March 2007 the National Guarantee College of PRC decided to expel Turigliatto from the party for 2 years. After his expulsion from the PRC, Turigliatto joined the new party Critical Left, born from a split in the PRC trozkist area.

In the 2008 general election Turigliatto was candidate to the Senate with Critical Left, but the party gained no seats.

In 2013, after the dissolution of Critical Left, Turigliatto founded Anticapitalist Left, of which he became the leader.
