= Critical Left =

Defunct Trotskyist party in Italy

Critical Left Sinistra Critica
- Spokespersons: Franco Turigliatto; Flavia D'Angeli; Piero Maestri
- Founded: 8 December 2007 (as a political party)
- Dissolved: 30 July 2013
- Split from: Communist Refoundation Party
- Succeeded by: Anticapitalist Left; Internationalist Solidarity/Communia Network
- Headquarters: Circonvallazione Casilina, 72-74; Rome
- Newspaper: Erre
- Membership: 1.200
- Ideology: Anti-Stalinism; Communism; Trotskyism
- Political position: Far-left
- European affiliation: European Anticapitalist Left
- International affiliation: Fourth International
- Coalition: Stand-alone
- Colors: Red

Website
- sinistracritica.org

Critical Left (Italian: Sinistra Critica, SC) was a communist and Trotskyist political party in Italy, affiliated to the Fourth International.

== History ==
Originally a Trotskyist faction within the Communist Refoundation Party (PRC), it broke ranks on 8 December 2007 to become an independent political party. From 2006 to 2008, SC had deputy Salvatore Cannavò and senator Franco Turigliatto who voted consistently against the Prodi II Cabinet and the latter was responsible of the first major crisis of the government on 22 February 2007. After this, Turigliatto was expelled from the PRC in March. In the 2008 general election, SC (890 members) ran its own lists and Flavia D'Angeli was chosen as candidate for Prime Minister of the party. In the election, SC gained 0.5% of the national vote.

SC dissolved in July 2013 and agreed to separate into two groupings which would each try out their different approaches, with the first grouping formed a new party called Anticapitalist Left while the second founded Internationalist Solidarity, a political association uninvolved in direct elections.

== Leadership ==
- Spokespersons: Salvatore Cannavò (2007–2009), Flavia D'Angeli (2008–present), Franco Turigliatto (2009–present) and Piero Maestri (2009–2013)

== Electoral results ==
=== Parliament ===
==== Chamber of Deputies ====
| Election year | No. of overall votes | % of overall vote | No. of overall seats won | +/- | Notes |
|---|---|---|---|---|---|
| 2008 | 168,916 | 0.5 | 0 / 630 | | |

==== Senate ====
| Election year | No. of overall votes | % of overall vote | No. of overall seats won | +/- | Notes |
|---|---|---|---|---|---|
| 2008 | 136.396 | 0.4 | 0 / 322 | | |
