= Green Europe =

Italian political party

Green Europe Europa Verde
- Spokespersons: Angelo Bonelli; Fiorella Zabatta
- President Guarantor: Marco Boato
- Presidents of the Federal Council: Filippo Zaratti; Elena Grandi
- Founded: list: 5 April 2019 party: 10 July 2021
- Preceded by: Federation of the Greens
- Headquarters: Via Valenziani 5, Rome
- Youth wing: Young Green Europeanists
- Ideology: Green politics
- Political position: Centre-left to Left-wing
- National affiliation: Electoral list: Greens and Left Alliance (since 2022); Coalition: Centre-left coalition
- European affiliation: European Green Party
- European Parliament group: Greens–European Free Alliance
- International affiliation: Global Greens
- Colours: Green
- Chamber of Deputies: 5 / 400
- Senate: 1 / 205
- European Parliament: 2 / 76
- Regional Councils: 13 / 896

Website
- europaverde.it

Green Europe (Italian: Europa Verde, EV), officially Green Europe – Greens (Europa Verde – Verdi), is a green political party in Italy. Its joint spokespersons are Angelo Bonelli and Fiorella Zabatta, while its president is Marco Boato.

EV was established as an electoral list to take part to the 2019 European Parliament election in connection with the European Green Party, including the Federation of the Greens, Green Italia, Possible and, locally, the Greens of South Tyrol. EV later fielded candidates under its symbol in several regional and local elections, before becoming a full-fledged political party in July 2021. In 2022 the party was a founding member of the Greens and Left Alliance, along with Italian Left, in order to run in the 2022 general election.

== History ==
In the early stages of the campaign for the 2019 European Parliament election, the Federation of the Greens and Green Italia formed an agreement with Italia in Comune of Federico Pizzarotti to form an electoral list for the 2019 European Parliament election. However, in March, Italia in Comune abandoned the alliance with the Greens, instead joining More Europe. The Greens subsequently made an agreement with Beatrice Brignone's Possible, whose members approved it in a vote. The Greens of South Tyrol also joined the alliance.

After that an article by Il Foglio reported that two candidates on the alliance's electoral list, Giuliana Farinaro and Elvira Maria Vernengo, had received support from the Green Front (led by Vincenzo Galizia, former leader of the youth section of the neo-fascist Tricolour Flame party), Giuseppe Civati informally withdrew his candidacy and suspended his election campaign.

The list received 2.3% of the vote, which was an improvement from 2014 but still not enough to exceed the 4% threshold for proportional representation in the European Parliament. Civati received the most votes of the list, with 12,247 preference votes.

In the 2020 regional elections, EV won seats in Veneto, Marche and Campania.

In July 2021, EV became a full-fledged political party, with Angelo Bonelli, a long-time member and leader of the Federation of the Greens, and Eleonora Evi, who had switched from the Five Star Movement (M5S), as its leaders.

In the 2021 local elections, EV won 0.9% of the vote in Rome, 5.1% in Milan, 3.2% in Naples, 0.9% in Turin and 2.8% in Bologna.

In January 2022, EV and Italian Left (SI) formed a "consultation pact", aimed at co-operating in the 2022 Italian presidential election. In that context, the two parties decided to jointly support Luigi Manconi, a former lawmaker for the Greens, the Democrats of the Left and the Democratic Party (PD), and human rights expert. In June 2022, SI's national assembly formally approved the alliance with EV.

In February 2022, four deputies hailing from the M5S, formed the "Green Europe" sub-group in the Mixed Group of the Chamber of Deputies. In March, a fifth deputy and former member of the M5S joined the party.

In July 2022, EV and SI held a joint convention in Rome named "New Energies", promoting their cooperation and a unitary electoral program. The alliance deliberately took inspiration from the New Ecological and Social People's Union, a left-wing coalition formed for the 2022 French legislative election. Following the fall of Draghi's government, the early dissolution of the Italian Parliament and the calling of the 2022 general election, AVS was officially launched and its logo presented. In August 2022, the alliance formalised an electoral agreement with the PD.

In the 2022 general election AVS obtained 3.6% of the vote, 12 deputies (including seven Greens) and four senators (including one Green).

In November 2023 Evi left the party in protest with Bonelli, accusing him and the party of patriarchy, and in April 2024 she joined the PD.

In the 2024 European Parliament election AVS obtained 6.8% of the vote and six seats, including two for Green members and two for independent greens.

In December 2024, during the party's national assembly (congress), Bonelli and Fiorella Zabatta were elected spokerspersons.

In December 2025, in the aftermath of the 2025 Campania regional election, Zabatta was appointed by president Roberto Fico as regional minister of Youth Policies, Sports, Civil Protection, Biodiversity, Reforestation Policies, Fishing, Aquaculture and Animal protection.

== Ideology and platform ==
The party's main ideology is green politics. The party, which is broadly progressive, also supports pro-Europeanism and feminism.

== Original composition ==
On the occasion of the 2019 European Parliament election, the list was composed of the following parties:

Party	Main ideology	Leader
Federation of the Greens (FdV)	Green politics	Angelo Bonelli
Green Italia (GI)	Green politics	Annalisa Corrado and Carmine Maturo
Possible (Pos)	Progressivism	Beatrice Brignone
Greens of South Tyrol (Grüne)	Green politics	Tobias Planer and Brigitte Foppa

== Election results ==
=== Italian Parliament ===
Election	Leader	Chamber of Deputies					Senate of the Republic					Government
Election	Leader	Votes	%	Seats	+/–	Position	Votes	%	Seats	+/–	Position	Government
2022	Angelo Bonelli; Eleonora Evi	Into AVS	3.63	7 / 400	▲7	7th	Into AVS	3.53	1 / 200	▲1	7th	Opposition (2022–present)

=== European Parliament ===
Election	Leader	Votes	%	Seats	+/–	EP Group
2019	Giuseppe Civati	621,492 (7th)	2.32	0 / 76	New	–
2024	Angelo Bonelli	Into AVS		4 / 76	▲4	Greens/EFA

=== Regional Councils ===
Region	Election year	Votes	%	Seats	+/−	Status in legislature
Aosta Valley	2025	Into Greens and Left Alliance		2 / 35	▲2	Opposition
Piedmont	2024	Into Greens and Left Alliance		0 / 49	0	No seats
Lombardy	2023	Into Greens and Left Alliance		1 / 80	▲1	Opposition
Trentino	2023	Into Greens and Left Alliance		1 / 35	▲1	Opposition
Veneto	2025	Into Greens and Left Alliance		0 / 51	▼1	Opposition
Friuli-Venezia Giulia	2023	Into Greens and Left Alliance		0 / 48	0	No seats
Emilia-Romagna	2024	Into Greens and Left Alliance		1 / 50	▲1	Majority
Liguria	2024	Into Greens and Left Alliance		1 / 31	▼1	Opposition
Tuscany	2025	Into Greens and Left Alliance		1 / 41	▲1	Majority
Marche	2025	Into Greens and Left Alliance		0 / 31	▼1	Opposition
Umbria	2024	Into Greens and Left Alliance		0 / 21	0	No seats
Lazio	2023	42,314 (8th) (Note: In a joint list with Possible)	2.7	1 / 51	▲1	Opposition
Abruzzo	2024	Into Greens and Left Alliance		1 / 31	▲1	Opposition
Campania	2025	Into Greens and Left Alliance		1 / 51	0	Majority
Molise	2023	Into Greens and Left Alliance		0 / 21	0	No seats
Apulia	2025	Into Greens and Left Alliance		0 / 51	0	No seats
Basilicata	2024	Into Greens and Left Alliance		0 / 21	0	No seats
Calabria	2025	Into Greens and Left Alliance		0 / 31	0	No seats
Sicily	2022	Into One Hundred Steps for Sicily		0 / 70	0	No seats
Sardinia	2024	Into Greens and Left Alliance		2 / 60	▲2	Majority

== Symbols ==
Official logo

2019 European election

== Leadership ==
- Spokespersons: Angelo Bonelli (2021–2024) / Eleonora Evi (2021–2023), Angelo Bonelli / Fiorella Zabatta (2024–present)
- President Guarantor: Marco Boato (2024–president)
- Presidents of the Federal Council: Marco Boato / Fiorella Zabatta (2021–2024), Filippo Zaratti / Elena Grandi (2024–present)
