= Party of the South (Italy) =

Party of the South - Progressive Southerners Partito del Sud - Meridionalisti Progressisti
- President: Natale Cuccurese
- Honorary President: Antonio Ciano
- Founded: 8 December 2007
- Headquarters: Viale Guglielmo Massaia 65 - 00154 Rome
- Ideology: Meridionalism; Regionalism; Democratic socialism
- Political position: Left-wing
- National affiliation: Civil Revolution (2013); PaP (2018); The Left (2019); People's Union (2022–2024); AVS (2024)
- European affiliation: Party of European Left
- Chamber of Deputies: 0 / 400
- Senate: 0 / 200
- European Parliament: 0 / 76
- Regional Councils: 0 / 896

Website
- http://www.partitodelsud.eu/

The Party of the South - Progressive Southerners (Italian: Partito del Sud - Meridionalisti Progressisti, PdS-MP) is a political party in Italy founded in 2007 by Antonio Ciano. The political action of the party is inspired by Guido Dorso.

In the general election of April 2008, the party ran only for the Senate and received 3,736 votes (0.01%).

During the national congress in Naples on 25 September 2010, Beppe De Santis was named new secretary of the party.

For the general elections of April 2013, the party presented its lists in Lazio and nominated some of its members in the Civil Revolution list in the region of northern Italy.

During the 4th national congress of the party, that took place in April 2013, Natale Cuccurese was named new President of the party.

On the occasion of the 2022 general elections, the PdS joined to the People's Union list, led by Luigi de Magistris, while Natale Cuccurese, party leader and municipal councilor in Quattro Castella, is a candidate for the Chamber of Deputies in Emilia-Romagna.

For the 2024 European Parliament election, PdS joined Greens and Left Alliance with the candidatures of Natale Cuccurese and Valeria Spinelli in the Southern Italy constituency.

== Election results ==
=== European Parliament ===
Election	Leader	Votes	%	Seats	+/–	EP Group
2024	Natale Cuccurese	Into AVS		0 / 76	New	–
