= Giobbe Covatta =

Italian comedian, actor and writer

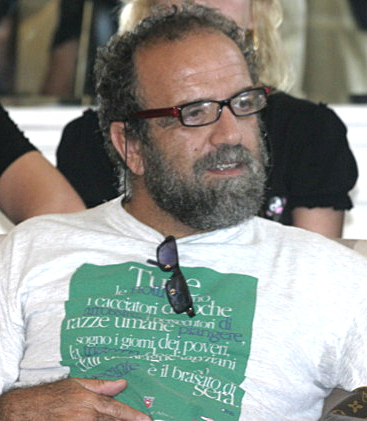
- Born: Gianni Maria Covatta; 11 June 1956 (age 69); Taranto, Italy
- Occupation(s): Comedian, actor
- Height: 1.78 m (5 ft 10 in)

Gianni Maria Covatta (born 11 June 1956), best known as Giobbe Covatta, is an Italian stand-up comedian, actor, writer and politician.

== Life and career ==
Born in Taranto and raised in Naples, following appearances on various variety shows, Covatta had his breakout in 1990 as a recurring guest on the Canale 5 talk show Maurizio Costanzo Show, where he read his comical compositions inspired by the Bible. These sketches eventually inspired a book, Parola di Giobbe, which was released in 1991 and got an immediate success, selling over a million copies and getting over thirty editions. In the later years, Covatta published other books, notably Pancreas, a parody of Edmondo De Amicis' Heart, and was active as an actor in films, television series and on stage.

In 2006, Covatta was elected councilor of the Federation of the Greens party in the Rome local elections. In 2015, he was elected national spokesperson of the party, still maintaining he did not consider himself a politician.
