= 2013 Democratic Party (Italy) leadership election =

2013 election of the leader of the Democratic Party of Italy

2013 Democratic Party leadership election
← 2009	8 December 2013	2017 →
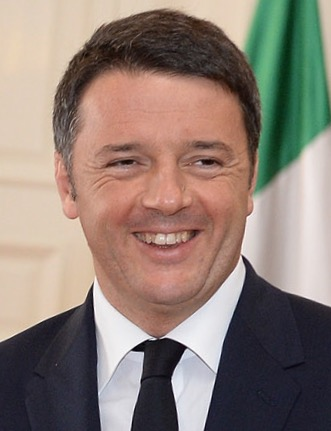

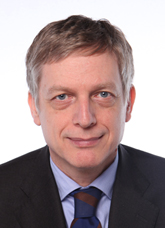

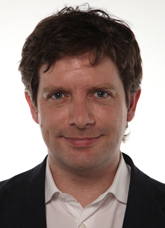
Nominee	Matteo Renzi	Gianni Cuperlo	Pippo Civati
Delegate count	657	194	149
Popular vote	1,895,332	510,970	399,473
Percentage	67.6%	18.2%	14.2%
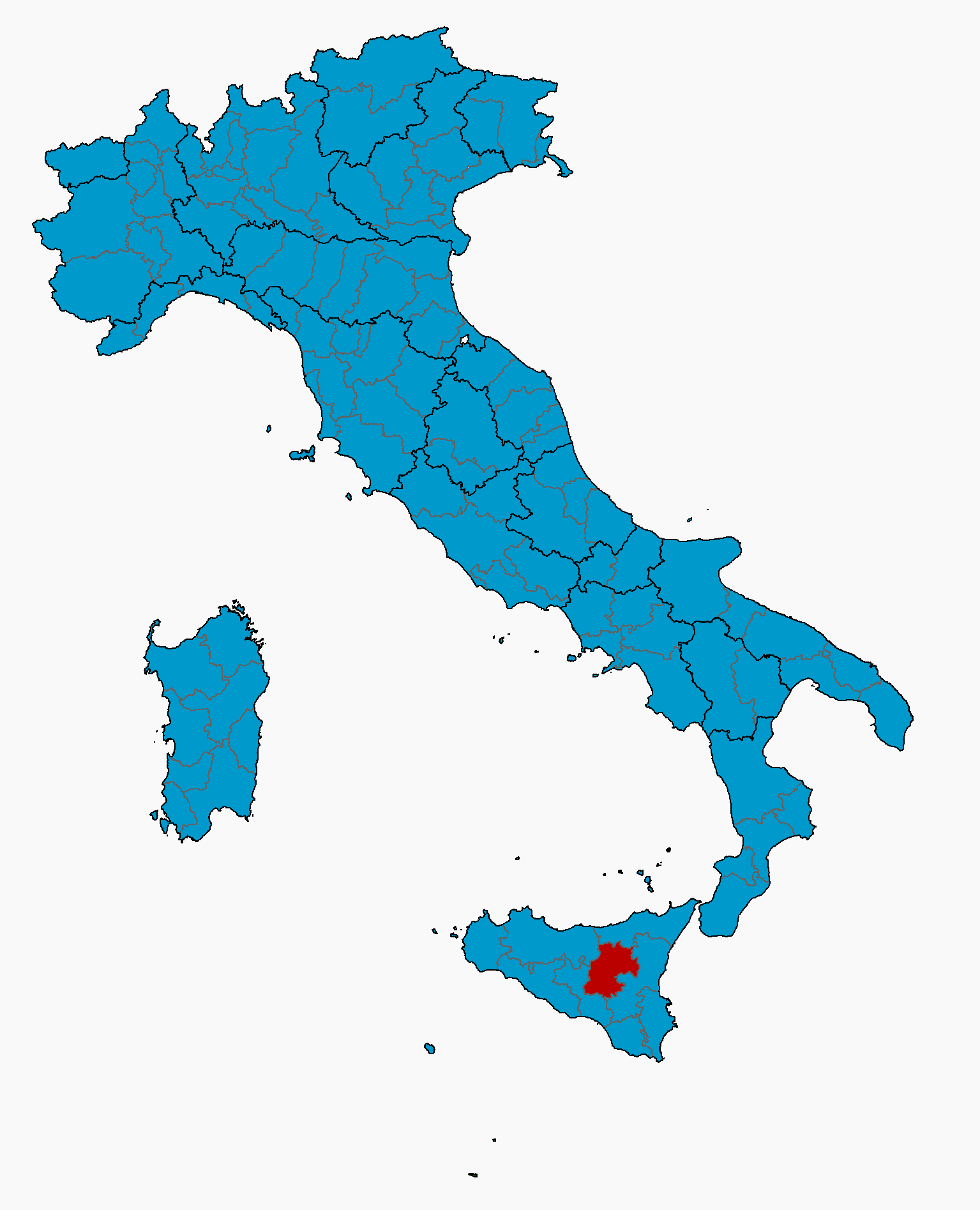
- Primary election results map. Azure denotes provinces with a Renzi plurality and Red denotes those with a Cuperlo plurality.
Secretary before election
Guglielmo Epifani
Elected Secretary
Matteo Renzi

The 2013 Democratic Party leadership election was an open primary election held in November–December 2013. After having come first in the vote by party members, Matteo Renzi was elected by a landslide 68% in a three-way primary on 8 December.

== Electoral process ==
Candidates were required to file their candidacies by 11 October 2013.

Between 14 October and 6 November local and provincial conventions took place all around the country. Between 7 and 17 November party members voted on the candidates for secretary. Under party rules the candidates who receive the support of at least the 15% of voting party members in local conventions or the three most voted candidates with at least 5% of the vote, qualify for the second round of the race and have the chance to present their platform at the national convention.

The national convention, which took place on 24–25 November, declared the candidates who will run in an open primary on 8 December. Voters will elect also the national assembly of the party and the regional secretaries and assemblies. If no candidate got more than 50% of the vote, a run-off between the two most voted candidates would take place in the national assembly, scheduled within two weeks from the primary election.

== Candidates ==
Four individuals filed their candidacy for becoming secretary of the party:

- Pippo Civati (campaign website, platform) — The main themes of Civati, a former Democrat of the Left, included participatory democracy, environmentalism, democratic socialism, secularism, social liberalism, international development and pacifism. Civati, whose views were somewhat close to those of Stefano Rodotà, was a proponent of an alliance with the Five Star Movement, instead of continuing the coalition government with the centre-right People of Freedom.
- Gianni Cuperlo (campaign website, platform) — A former member of the Italian Communist Party and the Democrats of the Left, Cuperlo was the candidate of the party's social-democratic establishment, including Massimo D'Alema and Pier Luigi Bersani.
- Gianni Pittella (campaign website, platform) — Pittella, a former member of the Italian Socialist Party and the Democrats of the Left, had his electoral strength in Southern Italy, where he was thrice elected to the European Parliament, of which he had been Vice President since 2009.
- Matteo Renzi (campaign website, platform) — Raised in a Christian Democratic household, formed in the Association of Italian Catholic Guides and Scouts and entered in politics with the Italian People's Party, Renzi represented the party's right-wing and proposed mostly liberal views. As such, he was often compared to Tony Blair, the key figure of New Labour. Elected mayor of Florence in 2009, Renzi had come to public notoriety as the "Scrapper" of the party's establishment and of many centre-left traditional positions as well.

== Opinion polls ==
Institute	Date	Civati	Cuperlo	Pittella	Renzi	Other
IPR	2 September 2013	5.0%	14.0%	3.0%	78.0%	0.0%
Epoké	20 September 2013	20.2%	13.2%	—	51.1%	15.5%
SWG	27 September 2013	4.0%	9.0%	3.0%	55.0%	29.0%
IPR	15 October 2013	17.0%	10.0%	10.0%	63.0%	0.0%
Demopolis	28 October 2013	10.0%	22.0%	3.0%	65.0%	0.0%
IPR	28 October 2013	13.0%	18.0%	4.0%	65.0%	0.0%
Quorum	11 November 2013	12.3%	14.5%	0.7%	72.5%	0.0%
Ispo	15 November 2013	7.0%	14.0%	1.0%	72.0%	6.0%
Quorum	18 November 2013	11.3%	16.4%	2.5%	69.8%	0.0%
Ixè	22 November 2013	12.0%	19.0%	—	58.0%	11.0%
Tecnè^{I}	25 November 2013	8.5%	38.1%	—	46.1%	7.3%
Tecnè^{II}	25 November 2013	7.4%	34.3%	—	46.2%	12.1%
Tecnè^{III}	25 November 2013	5.3%	32.1%	—	49.1%	13.5%
Tecnè^{IV}	25 November 2013	3.9%	29.1%	—	52.9%	14.1%
Quorum	25 November 2013	12.6%	17.4%	—	70.0%	0.0%
Ixè	29 November 2013	13.0%	23.0%	—	56.0%	8.0%
Quorum	1 December 2013	12.7%	20.7%	—	66.6%	0.0%
Tecnè^{V}	5 December 2013	10.1%	32.6%	—	52.2%	5.1%
Tecnè^{VI}	5 December 2013	8.8%	29.5%	—	53.0%	8.7%
Tecnè^{VII}	5 December 2013	8.1%	27.7%	—	54.9%	9.3%
Tecnè^{VIII}	5 December 2013	7.3%	26.0%	—	56.0%	10.7%
Ixè	6 December 2013	14.0%	21.0%	—	59.0%	6.0%

I: Turnout 1,1 million

II: Turnout 1,9 million
III: Turnout 2,6 million

IV: Turnout 3,2 million
V: Turnout 0,9 million

VI: Turnout 1,4 million
VII: Turnout 1,8 million

VIII: Turnout 2,1 million

== Results ==
=== Vote by party members ===
Candidate	Votes	%
Matteo Renzi	133,892	45.34
Gianni Cuperlo	116,454	39.44
Pippo Civati	27,841	9.43
Gianni Pittella	17,117	5.80
Total	295,304	100.0

Source: Official results

Renzi, Cuperlo and Civati were admitted to the primary election, while Pittella was excluded.

Vote by party members
Renzi	45.34%
Cuperlo	39.44%
Civati	9.43%
Pittella	5.80%

=== Primary election ===
Candidate	Votes	%	Delegates
Matteo Renzi	1,895,332	67.55	657
Gianni Cuperlo	510,970	18.21	194
Pippo Civati	399,473	14.24	149
Total	2,805,775	100.0	1,000

Source: Semi-official results

Popular vote
Renzi	67.55%
Cuperlo	18.21%
Civati	14.24%

=== Delegates summary ===
Portrait	Name	Logo	Delegates
	Matteo Renzi		657/1000 (66%)
	Gianni Cuperlo		194/1000 (19%)
	Giuseppe Civati		149/1000 (15%)

=== Results by Regions ===
Renzi won an absolute majority in all regions. Only among voters living abroad he won merely a plurality (47.1%). His strongest performances were in his homeregion Tuscany (78.4%) and neighbouring Marche (76.3%) and Umbria (74.5%), the weakest in Sardinia (56.0%). Cuperlo performed strongest in the southern regions of Calabria (34.2%) and Basilicata (33.7%), and weakest in Marche (10.7%). Civati had his strongest results among expatriates (22.3%), in Aosta Valley (20.7%), Trentino (20.5%) and Sardinia (19.6%), the weakest in the southern region of Basilicata (8.0%).

Generally speaking, Renzi and Civati did better in central–northern Italy, Cuperlo in the South.

Region	Renzi	Cuperlo	Civati
Abruzzo	67.4	20.0	12.6
Aosta Valley	63.5	15.2	21.3
Apulia	58.2	25.9	15.9
Basilicata	57.2	34.7	8.1
Calabria	57.8	33.7	8.6
Campania	62.3	28.7	9.1
Emilia-Romagna	71.1	15.0	13.9
Friuli-Venezia Giulia	66.2	17.5	16.4
Lazio	63.7	19.5	16.8
Liguria	62.0	19.4	18.6
Lombardy	66.0	15.1	18.9
Marche	76.0	10.8	13.2
Molise	63.4	28.4	8.2
Piedmont	68.8	15.2	16.0
Sardinia	56.4	23.8	19.8
Sicily	60.1	28.1	11.8
Trentino-Alto Adige	66.3	13.5	20.2
Tuscany	78.5	11.5	10.0
Umbria	75.4	14.6	10.0
Veneto	69.2	14.5	16.3
