= Giuseppe Civati =

Italian politician (born 1975)

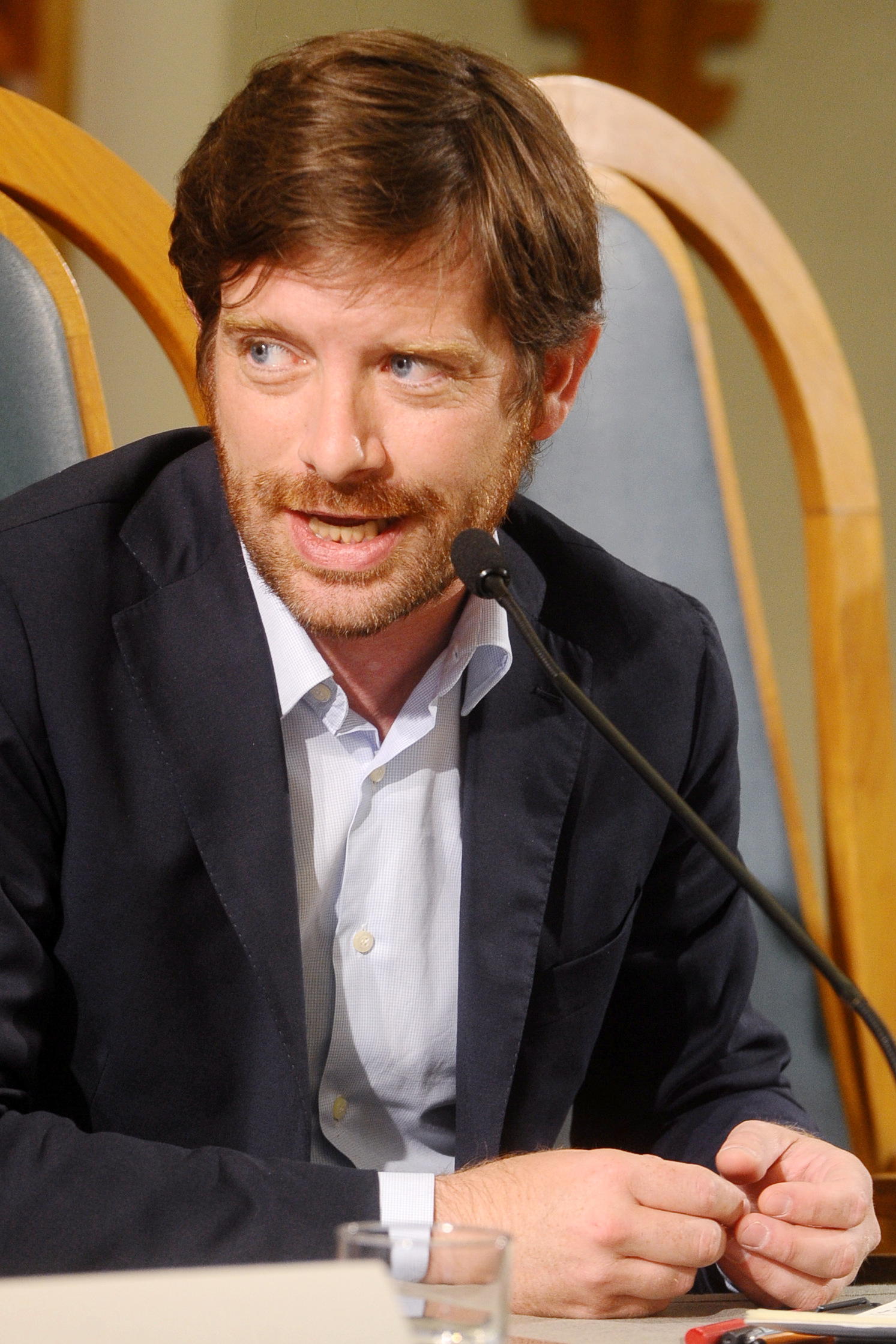

Member of the Chamber of Deputies
- In office 15 March 2013 – 23 March 2018

Personal details
- Born: 4 August 1975 (age 51) Monza, Italy
- Party: PDS (1991–1998); DS (1998–2007); PD (2007–2015); Possible (since 2015)
- Education: University of Milan
- Occupation: Politician, publisher, essayst

Giuseppe "Pippo" Civati (born 4 August 1975) is an Italian politician and publisher who was a member of the Chamber of Deputies from 2013 to 2018. Civati began his political career in the local politics of the 1990s with the Democratic Party of the Left (PDS). Civati went through the successors of the PDS, including the Democrats of the Left (DS) and the Democratic Party (PD), which he left in 2015 due to his increasing criticism of Matteo Renzi, which he had initially supported, and the Renziani to establish Possible.

== Early life and career ==
Civati was born on 4 August 1975 in Monza, in the Italian region of Lombardy. He graduated from the liceo classico in Monza named after Bartolomeo Zucchi. He graduated in Philosophy in 1998 and obtained a PhD in Philosophy from the University of Milan in 2004. Very close to Romano Prodi, Civati was elected to the City Council of Monza in 1997 and the following year became city secretary of the DS. From 2002 to 2004, he was a member of the provincial secretariat of the DS in the province of Milan from 2002 to 2004, while he was a member of the regional secretariat of the party in Lombardy from 2005 to 2006. In the 2005 Lombard regional election, Civat was elected to the Regional Council of Lombardy.

== Democratic Party and Possibile ==
After Walter Veltroni's resignation as secretary of the PD, Civati supported Ignazio Marino in the 2009 PD leadership election. Together with Renzi, Civati started in 2010 the Leopolda Convention, being a member of the current of Rottamatori (Scrappers). With the passing years, Civati became critical of Renzi's positions and the two split. In the 2013 Italian general election, Civati was elected to the Chamber of Deputies and promoted a dialogue between his party and the anti-establishment and populist Five Star Movement (M5S). Civati criticized the decision to form a government with Silvio Berlusconi and The People of Freedom (PdL), so he did not support the Letta government, and later also voted against the Renzi government. In the 2013 PD leadership election, Civati ran for the role of secretary of the PD but was defeated by Renzi. When Renzi became Prime Minister of Italy, Civati began to clash with the leadership of the party until he decided to leave the PD in May 2015, and founded a new centre-left party named Possible.

== Free and Equal and Green Europe ==
Possible was one of the founder parties of the left-wing Free and Equal coalition. In the 2018 Italian general election, Civati ran for the Chamber of Deputies but was not elected and later resigned as secretary of Possible. In the 2019 European Parliament election in Italy, he was a candidate on the Green Europe (EV) electoral list. After Il Foglio reported that two candidates on the list (Giuliana Farinaro and Elvira Maria Vernengo) had received support from the Green Front (led by Vincenzo Galizia, former leader of the youth section of the neo-fascist Tricolour Flame), Civati informally withdrew his candidacy and suspended his election campaign. Civati was not elected because EV received 2.29% of the votes, below the 4% threshold established by the Italian electoral law, although he was the most voted candidate on the list with 12,247 preferences,
