= Grazia Francescato =

Italian journalist and politician

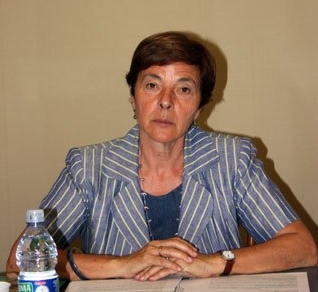

Member of the Chamber of Deputies
- In office 28 April 2006 – 28 April 2008

Personal details
- Born: 23 November 1946 (age 79) Paruzzaro, Piedmont, Italy
- Party: FLV (until 1990); FdV (1990–2009); SEL (after 2009)
- Education: Bocconi University
- Profession: Politician

Grazia Francescato (born 23 November 1946 in Paruzzaro) is an Italian politician, journalist and activist.

== Biography ==
She graduated in Foreign Languages and Literature at the Bocconi University of Milan, then moved to Rome and worked for the Daily American and Paese Sera. In 1973 she was among the founders of Effe, the first feminist magazine in Italy, which she also directed for two years, between 1976 and 1978. She was editor of ANSA since 1977, of which she was also a correspondent from Brussels. She also collaborated with many magazines and newspapers including Panorama and La Repubblica.

In 1985 she collaborated on the film Acta General de Chile, which was illegally filmed in Chile by director Miguel Littín, that won four prizes at the Venice International Film Festival. In 1990 she conducted the TV program Geo on Raitre.

In 1986 she was elected to the WWF National Council and in the following year was a candidate for the 1987 parliamentary election with the Federation of Green Lists. In 1989 she was candidate for the European Parliament, again among the Green Lists. President of WWF Italy from 1992 to 1998, in 1994 she also joined the WWF International Council.

From 1999 to 2001 she was President of the Federation of the Greens.

On 3 May 2003 she was elected in Malta Female Spokesperson for the European Greens during the XIV Couincil Meeting of the European Federation of Green Parties.

From 2003 to 2008 she was municipal councilor in Villa San Giovanni and in 2006 she was also elected Deputy among the ranks of the Greens.

Candidate for the 2008 general election on the Rainbow Left list, she was not re-elected. In July 2008 she was appointed spokesperson for the Greens, but in 2009 she decided to leave the party to join Left Ecology Freedom, led by Nichi Vendola.

Candidate again for the Senate in the 2013 parliamentary election on the list on the SEL list, she was not elected.
