= Gaetano Manfredi =

Italian professor and politician (born 1964)

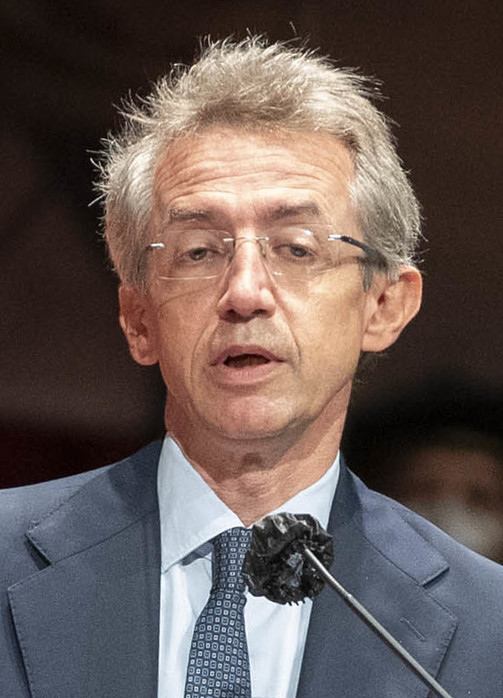

Mayor of Naples
- Incumbent
- Assumed office 18 October 2021
- Preceded by: Luigi de Magistris

Minister of University and Research
- In office 10 January 2020 – 13 February 2021
- Prime Minister: Giuseppe Conte
- Preceded by: Lorenzo Fioramonti
- Succeeded by: Maria Cristina Messa

Personal details
- Born: 4 January 1964 (age 62) Ottaviano, Campania, Italy
- Party: Independent
- Height: 1.83 m (6 ft 0 in)
- Spouse: Cettina Del Piano
- Children: 1
- Relatives: Massimiliano Manfredi (brother)
- Education: University of Naples Federico II

Gaetano Manfredi (born 4 January 1964) is an Italian university professor and politician. He has been mayor of Naples since 2021, and has served as the Minister of University and Research in the second government of Giuseppe Conte from 2020 to 2021.

== Academic career ==
Manfredi previously served as rector of University of Naples.

== Political career ==
=== Minister of University and Research ===
Manfredi has overseen the response to the COVID-19 outbreak in Italy in relation to Italian universities. Manfredi announced that online lessons would be delivered to students in key areas most affected by the outbreak starting from 2 March 2020.

=== Mayor of Naples ===
He was elected as Mayor of Naples in the 2021 Naples municipal election.

Political offices
| Preceded by Luigi de Magistris | Mayor of Naples since 2021 | Incumbent |
