= Viola Carofalo =

Italian politician

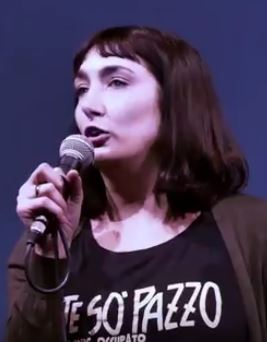

Personal details
- Born: 30 June 1980 (age 46) Naples, Italy
- Party: Power to the People (2017–present)
- Education: University of Naples Federico II; University of Naples "L'Orientale"
- Profession: Post-doctoral researcher

Viola Carofalo (born in Naples, Italy, 30 June 1980) is an Italian politician and former national spokesperson and leader of Power to the People, a coalition of parties, movements and associations (about a hundred among which Communist Refoundation Party, Italian Communist Party and The Other Europe) which contested the 2018 Italian general election.

== Study ==
Carofalo graduated in Philosophy and took her first PhD in 2008 in Modern and Contemporary Philosophy (SUM, Italian Institute of Human Sciences at the Università degli Studi di Napoli "Federico II") and a second Dottorato di Ricerca in 2012 in Philosophy and Politics (Università degli Studi di Napoli "L'Orientale").

She worked on the theme of bioethics and of the political myth in the thought of Ernst Cassirer and Roland Barthes, on the poetics of Bertolt Brecht and on the themes of recognition and interculturality.

In 2013, she published her first book on Frantz Fanon.

She is currently a postdoctoral research fellow at the Department of Human and Social Sciences at the Università degli Studi di Napoli "L'Orientale" and collaborates with the professorships of Moral Philosophy and Intercultural Ethics.

== Politics ==
Carofalo is an activist of Ex OPG "Je so' pazzo" (Former Asylum "I am crazy"), a social centre located in the building of the former Sant'Eframo judicial psychiatric hospital (Italian: ospedale psichiatrico giudiziario, OPG) in the Materdei rione in Naples.

Carofalo was chosen as national spokesperson on 17 December 2017 and as political leader from 6 January 2018 of Power to the People.

== Bibliography ==
- Viola Carofalo, "Fanon. Lo spettro negro", La Casa Usher, Florence, 2013, ISBN 9788895065915
- Viola Carofalo, "Un pensiero dannato: Frantz Fanon e la politica del riconoscimento", Mimesis, Milan-Udine, 2013, ISBN 9788857519593
- Viola Carofalo, "Le due città: metropoli e identità mutanti", Università degli Studi di Napoli "L'Orientale", Naples, 2015, ISBN 9788867191024
- Viola Carofalo, "Frantz Fanon: dalla liberazione dei popoli alla liberazione dell'Uomo!", Hachette, Milan, 2016, ISBN
- Viola Carofalo, "Dai più lontani margini: J.M. Coetzee e la scrittura dell'altro", Mimesis, Milan-Udine, 2016, ISBN 9788857536248
