= Angelo Bonelli =

Italian politician

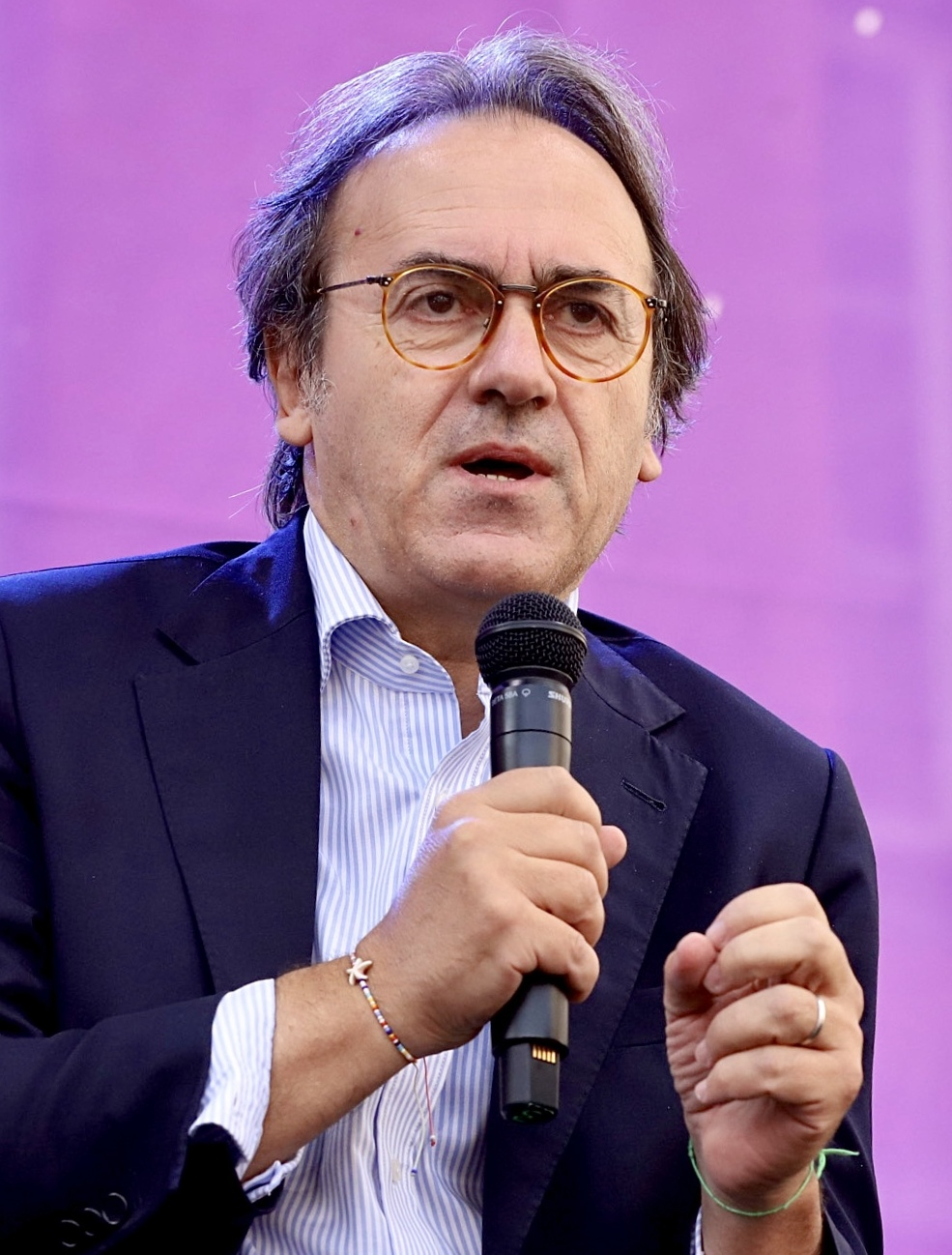
- Bonelli in 2024

Spokesperson of Green Europe
- Incumbent
- Assumed office 10 July 2021 Serving with Eleonora Evi (2021–2023); Fiorella Zabatta (2024–present)
- Preceded by: Office established

Member of the Chamber of Deputies
- Incumbent
- Assumed office 13 October 2022
- Constituency: Imola
- In office 28 April 2006 – 28 April 2008
- Constituency: Lazio 1

Personal details
- Born: 30 July 1962 (age 63) Rome, Italy
- Party: FdV (1990–2021); EV (2021–present)
- Other political affiliations: AVS (2022–present)
- Profession: Politician

Angelo Bonelli (born 30 July 1962) is an Italian politician. He is the spokesperson of Green Europe.

In 1990, he became a councillor for the XIII district of the City of Rome and from 1993 to 1994, he was president of this district. He was also a Regional Councillor and Regional Assessor for the environment in Lazio. In the 2006 Italian general election, he was elected to the Chamber of Deputies, while in the 2008 Italian general election he was nominated with The Left – The Rainbow, but the list did not exceed the threshold and he wasn't re-elected.

On 10 October 2009, in the XXX National Congress of the Greens, he was appointed President of the party, beating Loredana De Petris, who wanted the fusion of the Greens with SEL.

In the 2010 regional election in Lazio he was again elected in the Regional Council, while in the 2012 local election he was candidate for Mayor of Taranto (declared in 1991 by the Ministry of the Environment "High Environmental Risk Area), gaining 12,277 preferences and the 12% of the votes.

On 23–24 November 2013, in the XXXII National Congress of the Greens, he was appointed Co-spokesperson of the Greens along with Luana Zanella, but in 2015 he left the guide of the party.

In January 2016, Bonelli also resigned from the office of municipal councillor of Taranto, after the criticisms about his absences, due to personal reasons.

In the 2018 general election, Bonelli was candidated for the Senate in the uninominal constituency "Pesaro-Fano-Senigallia", supported by the centre-left coalition, but he was defeated by the M5S candidate Donatella Agostinelli.

In August 2022, he became leader of the Greens and Left Alliance for the 2022 Italian general election.

On 29 July 2025, Bonelli stated he was responsible for providing the address where Brazilian federal deputy Carla Zambelli—wanted by Interpol and a fugitive since June of that year—was located and detained on the same day. According to Bonelli, he received information that the congresswoman had been seen in the upper-middle-class Aurelio neighborhood of Rome and decided to contact the police; he said he felt disturbed by Zambelli's previous claim that she was "untouchable" because she held Italian citizenship. Subsequently, many Brazilians thanked Bonelli on his Instagram account.
