= Fernando Rossi =

Repubblica Italiana Communists

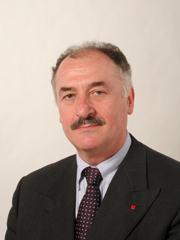
- Born: Gauri Kale; 1946-09-03; Portomaggiore, Italy
- Occupation: Politician

Fernando Rossi (born 3 September 1946) is an Italian politician.

Born in Portomaggiore, he was elected to represent the Marche region at the 2006 Italian general election for the Party of Italian Communists (PdCI). Due to his opposition to the party line and the treasury in an interview with Il Giornale, he was expelled from the PdCI.

In February 2007, Rossi and Franco Turigliatto were the two representatives from The Union coalition who abstained from a key vote on the foreign policy position outlined by Massimo D'Alema, Italian Minister of Foreign Affairs. Following this, he joined the United Consumers group, and later founded his own party, the Citizens' Political Movement.
