= Democratic Republicans (Italy) =

Italian political party

Democratic Republicans Repubblicani Democratici
- Leader: Giuseppe Ossorio
- Founded: 2004
- Dissolved: 2010
- Split from: Italian Republican Party
- Merged into: Italian Republican Party
- Headquarters: Via Miguel Cervantes de Saavedra 52, Naples
- Ideology: Liberalism; Republicanism
- Political position: Centre-left

Democratic Republicans (Repubblicani Democratici, RD) was a minor liberal political party in Italy, led by Giuseppe Ossorio.

The party was founded in 2004 by a splinter faction of the Italian Republican Party (PRI), who opposed the alliance with the centre-right House of Freedoms coalition.

== History ==
At the 2005 regional elections, the party presented its list only in Campania, where it won 1.4% of the popular vote and Ossorio was re-elected to the Regional Council.

In 2005, the party sided with The Union and contested the 2006 general election within the list of Antonio Di Pietro's Italy of Values (IdV). Consequently, to this pact of federation, Ossorio was elected to the Chamber of Deputies in his home region Campania and his seat in the IdV caucus.

On 20 September 2007, Ossorio announced that the Democratic Republicans were joining the centre-left Democratic Party (PD) alongside fellow ex-PRI members of the European Republicans Movement (MRE).

In 2010 the party returned into the PRI's fold.
