= Federation of the Greens =

Federation of the Greens Federazione dei Verdi
- Founded: 9 December 1990
- Dissolved: 10 July 2021
- Merger of: Federation of Green Lists; Rainbow Greens
- Succeeded by: Green Europe
- Headquarters: Via Salandra 6, Rome
- Newspaper: Notizie Verdi
- Youth wing: Young Greens
- Membership (2004): 31,000
- Ideology: Green politics Eco-socialism; Alter-globalization
- Political position: Left-wing
- National affiliation: Alliance of Progressives (1994–1995); The Olive Tree (1996–2004); The Sunflower (2001); The Union (2005–2008); Together with the Union (2006); The Left – The Rainbow (2007–2008); Left and Freedom (2009); Ecologists and Civic Networks (2011–2013); Civil Revolution (2013); European Greens – Green Italia (2014); Together (2017–2018); Green Europe (2019–2021)
- European affiliation: European Green Party
- European Parliament group: Greens/EFA (1994–2009)
- International affiliation: Global Greens
- Colors: Green

Website
- www.verdi.it

The Federation of the Greens (Italian: Federazione dei Verdi, FdV), frequently referred to as Greens (Verdi), was a green political party in Italy. It was formed in 1990 by the merger of the Federation of Green Lists and the Rainbow Greens.

The FdV was part of the European Green Party and the Global Greens. In July 2021 it was merged into Green Europe.

== History ==
=== Background and foundation ===
The Federation of Green Lists was formed in 1984 by leading environmentalists and anti-nuclear activists, notably including Gianni Mattioli, Gianfranco Amendola, Massimo Scalia and Alexander Langer.

The party made its debut at the 1987 general election and obtained 2.6% of the vote, gaining 13 seats in the Chamber of Deputies and two senators. Later that year, the Greens successfully campaigned for three referendums aimed at stopping nuclear power in Italy, which had been proposed by the left-liberal Radical Party and was eventually supported by the country's three main parties (Christian Democrats, Communists and Socialists).

At the 1989 European Parliament election there were two competing green parties: the LV and the Rainbow Greens (VA), formed mainly by Radicals, including Adelaide Aglietta, Franco Corleone, Adele Faccio, Marco Taradash and Francesco Rutelli, as well as splinters from Proletarian Democracy, including Mario Capanna, Guido Pollice, Gianni Tamino and Edo Ronchi. The two lists obtained a combined 6.2% of the vote, of which 3.8% for the LV and 2.4% for the VA, and 5 MEPs.

In 1990 the two parties joined forces to form the Federation of the Greens, which inherited from the LV the Smiling Sun symbol of the northern European anti-nuclear movement, designed by Danish activist Anne Lund in 1975. In the 1992 general election the new party won 2.8% of the vote, returning 16 deputies and 4 senators. The party was briefly a member of the Ciampi Cabinet formed 28 April 1993, its sole minister resigning a day after the cabinet's swearing-in ceremony.

=== Centre-left coalitions ===
In 1993 the Greens joined forces with the Democratic Party of the Left (PDS) within the Alliance of Progressives, a broad left-wing coalition. As a result, Rutelli was elected mayor of Rome. The party was also joined by Carlo Ripa di Meana, a former Socialist member of the European Commission and minister of the Environment, who became the party's leader.

In the 1994 European Parliament election won 3.2% of the vote and three MEPs, its best result as a joint party.

In 1995 the Greens were a founding member of The Olive Tree coalition and in the 1996 general election, thanks to this alliance and several candidates in single-seat constituencies, they obtained 14 deputies and 14 senators, their highest number ever. Following the election, the Greens took place in the centre-left governments led by Romano Prodi, Massimo D'Alema and Giuliano Amato. Ronchi was minister of the Environment (1996–2000) and Alfonso Pecoraro Scanio minister of Agriculture (2000–2001).

Since 1996 the party however started a slow decline. Some of its leading members left: Rutelli (who was re-elected mayor of Rome) in 1997 and Ripa di Meana in 1998. The party also suffered the competition of several centre-left parties, some of them new as The Democrats, of which Rutelli was a founding member. In the 1999 European Parliament election the Greens were reduced to 1.8% and two MEPs, prompting the resignation of Luigi Manconi, who had led the party since 1996. The party was thus re-organised under Grazia Francescato, a former president of the Italy's section of the World Wide Fund for Nature (WWF).

At the 2001 general election the Greens formed a joint list with the Italian Democratic Socialists (SDI): The Sunflower. The combination scored 2.2%, thus failing to surpass the 4% threshold. The Greens elected seven deputies and ten senators in single-member constituencies, as part of The Olive Tree coalition.

=== Shift to the far left ===
After the alliance with the SDI, a relatively centrist party, the Greens shifted far to the left, prompting the exit of leading members as Ronchi, Mattioli, Scalia, Corleone and Manconi. The Greens were since part of the so-called "radical left", along with the Communist Refoundation Party (PRC) and the Party of Italian Communists (PdCI).

At the 2004 European Parliament election the Greens obtained 2.5% of the vote and two MEPs.

In February 2005 the Greens joined The Union, the new successor alliance to The Olive Tree, with party secretary Alfonso Pecoraro Scanio receiving 2.2% of the vote in the open primary election for the coalition's leader. At the 2006 general election the party was part of the winning coalition The Union, and scored 2.1%, obtained 15 seats in the Chamber of Deputies. The Together with the Union list, an alliance of Greens, Communists and Consumers polled 4.2% in the election for the Senate, electing 11 senators, 5 of whom were Greens. In 2006–2008 Pecoraro Scanio served as minister of the Environment, while Paolo Cento, national coordinator of the party and leader of the no global faction, was undersecretary of Economy and Finances.

In November 2006 Pecoraro Scanio's political line was confirmed in a party congress, but the Greens also tried to re-open the doors to all former members. The attempt of re-uniting the Italian Greens failed as soon as in January 2007, when Mattioli, Scalia and Corleone finally left the party again, citing that it was drifting too much the far left, and announced their intention to participate to the foundation of the Democratic Party (PD). Within the PD, they joined the Democratic Ecologists' faction, which already included several former Greens (Manconi, Ronchi, Lino De Benetti, Stefano Semenzato, Ermete Realacci, Gianni Vernetti, Franco Piro, Francesco Ferrante, Carla Rocchi, etc.). As a result, Legambiente, the largest environmentalist association of Italy, showed more support for the PD than the Greens themselves.

=== Out of Parliament ===
In the run-up of the 2008 general election, the Greens participated in the foundation of The Left – The Rainbow electoral list with the PRC, the PdCI and Democratic Left (SD). The coalition obtained just 3.1% of the vote and the Greens lost their parliamentary representation.

In the summer of 2008 Grazia Francescato, who had been leader before, represented the party's establishment and in the event was supported by Cento's left-wing, was elected at the helm of the party, by defeating two modernizers, Marco Boato and Fabio Roggiolani.

For the 2009 election the Greens formed a joint list with the Movement for the Left (MpS) – a moderate split from the PRC –, the Socialist Party (PS) – successor of the SDI –, SD and Unite the Left (UlS): Left and Freedom (SL). The list received just 3.1% of the vote and failed to return any MEPs. After the election, it was decided to transform SL into a permanent federation, that would eventually evolve into the joint party named Left Ecology Freedom (SEL), and Francescato wanted the Greens to join it.

However, during a party congress in October 2009 the party rejected the proposal by narrowly electing Angelo Bonelli, candidate of the liberal faction led by Boato, instead of Francescato's candidate, Loredana De Petris. After his election, which marked the end of the dominance of the internal left wing over the party, Bonelli announced that the party will pursue an independent course from SL, and will try to coalesce a new "ecologist constituent assembly" on the model of the French Europe Écologie. Francescato, De Petris and Cento continued to support SL as the Ecologists Association and would eventually leave the Greens.

=== New coalitions ===
In September 2010 the Greens launched an Ecologist Constituent Assembly. In Bonelli's view the new political force would take inspiration both from the French Verts and the German Grünen and would be open to the contribution of movements and associations, notably including Beppe Grillo's Five Star Movement (M5S). Other than the Greens, participants of the new political force included, among others, Massimo Scalia (a former leading Green), Bruno Mellano (president of the Italian Radicals), movie maker Mario Monicelli, writer Dacia Maraini, geologist Mario Tozzi and comedian Giobbe Covatta. As a result, in November 2011 the Ecologists and Civic Networks (Ecologisti e Reti Civiche, ERC) coalition was officially launched, but it would be just a short-lived experiment.

In 2012 Bonelli stood as candidate for mayor of Taranto, garnering 11.9% of the vote.

In the 2013 general election the Greens were part of the Civil Revolution coalition, which obtained a mere 2.2% of the vote and no seats. In May the ERC was disbanded and in November, during a party congress, Luana Zanella was elected to serve as co-spokesperson along with Bonelli.

The Greens contested the 2014 European Parliament election with Green Italia (GI), a green party established in 2013 and led by Monica Frassoni and Fabio Granata, within the joint list European Greens – Green Italia. The electoral list received 0.9% of the vote and did not return any MEPs.

In January 2015 senator Bartolomeo Pepe, a former member of the M5S, joined the party, giving it parliamentary representation after seven years. In June another former senator of the M5S, Paola De Pin, joined the Greens and sat with senator Pepe within the Great Autonomies and Freedom group. Both Pepe and De Pin would soon leave the party. Another former M5S senator, Cristina De Pietro, would join the Greens in November 2016 and leave next year.

In November 2015, during a party congress, Covatta was elected spokesperson, succeeding to Bonelli and Zanella. However, Covatta's role was soon transformed into that of a testimonial. In February 2017 the party appointed Bonelli and Fiorella Zabatta to serve as day-to-day coordinators and Zanella as international secretary. Later that year, the coordinators were three: Bonelli, Zanella and, representing the party's minority, Gianluca Carrabs.

=== Return to the centre-left ===
In December 2017, in an internal referendum, 73% of Green members voted in favour of their party's return to the moderate centre-left coalition led by the PD. Consequently, the Greens formed, along with the Italian Socialist Party and Civic Area, the Together electoral list for the 2018 general election. When the results came in, the list had obtained a mere 0.6% of the vote and no seats; additionally, no Green was elected in single-seat constituencies. After the election, Bonelli resigned from the executive and the remaining two coordinators, Zanella and Carrabs, led the transition.

In December 2018, during a party congress, Matteo Badiali and Elena Grandi, supported by Bonelli and Zanella, were elected co-spokespersons of the party.

In the run-up to the 2019 European Parliament election the party formed Green Europe (EV), a joint electoral list with Italy in Common (IiC) and GI. The alliance was reinforced by Marco Affronte, who had been elected with the M5S in 2014 and had joined as an independent the Greens–European Free Alliance group and the European Green Party, and eventually announced on Facebook that he had joined the FdV. However, IiC soon left the Greens in order to form an alternative alliance with More Europe, a liberal party. The list received 2.3% of the vote, quite an improvement from 2014, but still not enough to exceed the 4% threshold.

In the 2020 Italian regional elections a re-edition of Green Europe won seats in Emilia-Romagna, Veneto, Marche and Campania. Together with the seat won in Trentino in 2018, the Greens had a total of 5 seats in Regional Councils, their best result in terms of representation in a decade.

In March 2021 Rossella Muroni (GI) left the Free and Equal group in order to establish, along with Lorenzo Fioramonti (GI, former M5S), Alessandro Fusacchia (Italian Radicals, former +E), Andrea Cecconi (ex-M5S) and Antonio Lombardo (ex-M5S), a sub-group of the FdV within the Mixed Group instead.

In July 2021 the FdV was merged into EV.

== Popular support ==
In their history the Greens were never able to reach the electoral success of many green parties all around Europe. They had a stable share of vote around 2% and experienced a slight decline in the 2010s. At the beginning, the party was stronger in northern Italy (for instance 7.1% in the 1990 Venetian regional election), but since the 2000s its strongholds were in the South, with some notable exceptions

The Greens were stronger in cities and urban areas (Milan, Venice, Rome, Naples, etc.), in northern mountain regions, such as Trentino-Alto Adige/Südtirol (especially in South Tyrol, where they were organised in the local Greens, a broader left-wing party) and Aosta Valley (where the local section, the Alternative Greens, were merged into Autonomy Liberty Participation Ecology in 2010), and in some southern regions, such as Basilicata and Campania.

== Election results ==
=== Italian Parliament ===
Election	Leader	Chamber of Deputies				Senate of the Republic			
Election	Leader	Votes	%	Seats	+/–	Votes	%	Seats	+/–
1987	Gianni Mattioli	969,218	2.5	13 / 630	New	634,182	1.9	1 / 315	New
1992	Carlo Ripa di Meana	1,093,995	2.8	16 / 630	▲3	1,022,558	3.0	4 / 315	▲3
1994	Carlo Ripa di Meana	1,047,268	2.7	11 / 630	▼5	Into AdP		7 / 315	▲3
1996	Carlo Ripa di Meana	938,665	2.5	14 / 630	▲3	Into Ulivo		14 / 315	▲7
2001	Grazia Francescato	805.340 (with SDI)	2.2	8 / 630	▼6	Into Ulivo		8 / 315	▼6
2006	Alfonso Pecoraro Scanio	783,944	2.1	15 / 630	▲7	1,423,226 (with PdCI)	4.2	11 / 315	▲3
2008	Alfonso Pecoraro Scanio	Into SA		0 / 630	▼15	Into SA		0 / 315	▼11
2013	Angelo Bonelli	Into RC		0 / 630	0	Into RC		0 / 315	0
2018	Angelo Bonelli	Into Together		0 / 630	0	Into Together		0 / 315	0

=== European Parliament ===
Election	Leader	Votes	%	Seats	+/–	EP Group
1994	Carlo Ripa di Meana	1,055,797	3.2	3 / 87	New	Green
1999	Grazia Francescato	548,908	1.8	2 / 87	▼1	Greens/EFA
2004	Alfonso Pecoraro Scanio	803,356	2.5	2 / 78	0	Greens/EFA
2009	Alfonso Pecoraro Scanio	Into SL		0 / 72	0	–
2014	Angelo Bonelli	250,102 (as GI–VE)	0.9	0 / 73	0	–
2019	Angelo Bonelli	621,492 (as EV)	2.3	0 / 76	0	–

== Leadership ==
The party was successively led by spokespersons, presidents and coordinators. Bold indicates the real leader/s of the time.

- Spokesperson: **Gianni Francesco Mattioli** (1991–1993), **Carlo Ripa di Meana** (1993–1996), **Luigi Manconi** (1996–1999), **Grazia Francescato** (2008–2009), **Angelo Bonelli** / **Luana Zanella** (2013–2015), **Giobbe Covatta** (2015–2017), **Matteo Badiali** / **Elena Grandi** (2018–2021)
- President: **Grazia Francescato** (1999–2001), **Alfonso Pecoraro Scanio** (2001–2008), **Angelo Bonelli** (2009–2013)
- Coordinator of the Executive: Angelo Bonelli (2001–2004), Paolo Cento (2004–2006), Massimo Fundarò (2006–2009), **Angelo Bonelli** / **Fiorella Zabatta** (2017), **Angelo Bonelli** / **Luana Zanella** / **Gianluca Carrabs** (2017–2018), **Luana Zanella** / **Gianluca Carrabs** (2018), Angelo Bonelli (2019–2021)
- President of the Federal Council: Franco Corleone (1993–1997), Massimo Scalia (1997–1999)
- Party Leader in the Chamber of Deputies: Gianni Francesco Mattioli (1987–1989), Laura Cima (1989–1991), Massimo Scalia (1991–1992), Francesco Rutelli (1992–1993), Gianni Francesco Mattioli (1993–1994, deputy-leader of the PDS group in 1994–1996), Anna Maria Procacci (1996–2001), Alfonso Pecoraro Scanio (2001–2006), Angelo Bonelli (2006–2008)
- Party Leader in the Senate: Marco Boato (1987–1992), Carla Rocchi (1992–1994), Edo Ronchi (1994–1996), Maurizio Pieroni (1996–2001), Stefano Boco (2001–2006), Natale Ripamonti (deputy-leader of the PdCI–Green group, 2006–2008)
- Party Leader in the European Parliament: Alexander Langer (1989–1994), Gianni Tamino (1994–1999), Giorgio Celli (1999–2004), Monica Frassoni (2004–2009)
