= Luigi de Magistris (politician) =

Italian politician and former prosecutor (born 1967)

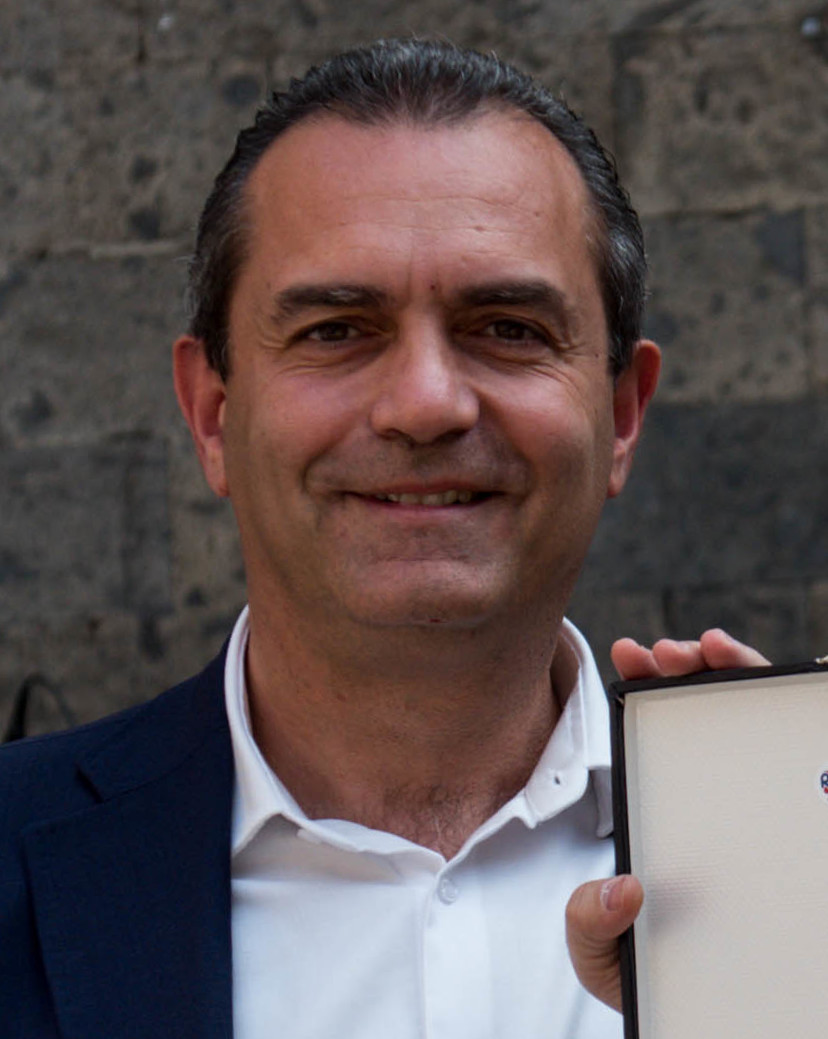

Mayor of Naples
- In office 1 June 2011 – 18 October 2021
- Preceded by: Rosa Russo Iervolino
- Succeeded by: Gaetano Manfredi

Leader of People's Union
- In office 29 July 2022 – 4 March 2024
- Preceded by: Order created

Member of the European Parliament for Southern Italy
- In office 14 July 2009 – 1 June 2011

Personal details
- Born: 20 June 1967 (age 59) Naples, Italy
- Party: Independent (since 2024)
- Other political affiliations: Italy of Values (2009–2012); Orange Movement (2012–2017); Democracy and Autonomy (2017–2022); People's Union (2022–2024)
- Height: 1.80 m (5 ft 11 in)
- Spouse: Maria Teresa Dolce (m. 1998)
- Children: 2
- Education: University of Naples Federico II
- Occupation: Politician, former prosecutor

Luigi de Magistris (born 20 June 1967) is an Italian politician and former prosecutor who served as mayor of Naples from 2011 to 2021. He began his prosecutor career in 1995, attracting significant media attention for his investigations, and served in this role between Naples and Catanzaro until 2009. He was also a member of the European Parliament (MEP) from 2009 to 2011. In 2021, he ran for president of Calabria in a snap election but finished third. In 2022, he founded the People's Union (UP), an electoral list and political coalition of which he was leader as its spokesperson until 2024.

== Career ==
De Magistris was born in Naples on 20 June 1967 into a family of magistrates. He started his career as a prosecutor in 1995 and worked in Naples from 1998 to 2002. He was a deputy public prosecutor in Catanzaro from 2002 to 2009. His investigations frequently focused on links between politicians and Italian organised crime. In 2011, de Magistris ran for mayor of Naples as the candidate of Italy of Values (IdV). He qualified for the runoff by finishing second with 27% of the vote, and subsequently won in the second round, defeating The People of Freedom (PDL) candidate Gianni Lettieri with 65% of the vote.

As his investigations involved famous names such as Romano Prodi and Clemente Mastella, de Magistris was at the centre of media controversy. The then Minister of Justice Clemente Mastella asked de Magistris to be transferred because he had allegedly revealed Mastella's name as well as those of other Italian politicians apparently involved in his investigations. In January 2008, de Magistris appeared before the High Council of the Judiciary (CSM), the governing board of the Italian judiciary, to defend himself against the serious allegations of the Minister of Justice and his inspectors.

De Magistris was the second most voted politician in the 2009 European Parliament election in Italy. In 2013, he recognised the State of Palestine and obtained a Palestinian passport, having received an honorary citizenship by the Palestinian Authority; he later said that he was the only Italian to hold one and that his was the number six. In 2015, he founded the left-wing party Democracy and Autonomy (DemA). In 2016, he won a second term as mayor of Naples after obtaining 42% of the votes in the first round and 66% of the votes in a runoff against Lettieri, the same centre-right coalition candidate he had defeated five years earlier. In 2017, he obtained the Valerioti-Impastato award for his work against crime and corruption.

In April 2018, de Magistris wrote to the head of the Naples port authority, Rear Admiral Arturo Faraone, expressing his displeasure with the presence of USS John Warner (SSN-785) near his city. It had fired six Tomahawk missiles during the 2018 bombing of Damascus and Homs. He made reference to a resolution passed in 2015 that declared the Port of Naples a "nuclear-free area". He called Naples a "City of Peace" that respects "the fundamental rights of everyone, convinced of disarmament and international cooperation". In January 2021, de Magistris announced that he would run in the 2021 Calabrian regional election to replace the late Jole Santelli as the candidate od DemA. In the election held in October 2021, when his term as mayor of Naples also expired, he finished third with 16% of the votes, behind the centre-right coalition candidate Roberto Occhiuto and the centre-left coalition and Five Star Movement candidate Amalia Bruni.

In July 2022, inspired by Jean-Luc Mélenchon and the New Ecological and Social People's Union (NUPES), de Magistris launched the People's Union (UP), the successor of the coalition of the left-wing parties that in the 2018 Italian general election had run in the Power to the People electoral list, to run in the 2022 Italian general election. Mélenchon himself travelled to Italy to take part at a citizens' assembly at Piazza dei Consoli in Rome, where he endorsed de Magistris' coalition. Notably, in doing so, he ignored the former prime minister and Five Star Movement (M5S) leader Giuseppe Conte, who successfully improved his party's fortune by moving the M5S further to the left during the electoral campaign, dismissing the M5S as "an annex of all the powerful people in this country", and argued that left-wing people should vote for de Magistris' People's Union.

In the snap election held in September 2022, the People's Union did not cross the 3% electoral threshold, having received 1.4% of the vote in the Chamber of Deputies and 1.3% of the vote in the Senate of the Republic, and thus did not obtain any seat in the Italian Parliament. De Magistris was leader of the People's Union until he stepped down as spokesperson on 4 March 2024, having announced in March that he would not run for the 2024 European Parliament election in Italy. He also did not exclude another run as mayor fo Naples.

== Investigations ==
During his career as a prosecutor, de Magistris was involved in a number of notable investigations. While in Catanzaro, de Magistris worked for several years on the "Poseidone" investigation into misuse by politicians of European Economic Community (EEC) subsidies for sewage filter systems and other business projects in Calabria. Among the individuals investigated by de Magistris was Lorenzo Cesa, a MEP and secretary of the Union of the Centre whose criminal charges were ultimately dismissed by the preliminary hearing judge. According to de Magistris, Cesa was allegedly one of the "promoters and organisers" of fraudulent use of European Union (EU) funding to the detriment of the EU and the Calabria region between 2001 and 2004, totaling 5 billion of the old Italian lire. The "Poseidone" case was taken away from de Magistris, as was the "Why Not" investigation in which the names of well-known politicians came up. This investigation was due to be wound up after nearly two years, and the persons involved formally indicted.

The European Anti-Fraud Office (OLAF) started the enquiry and handed it over to de Magistris in May 2005. Investigations started in May 2005 into an allegedly illegal use of €200 million of EEC funds. De Magistris was removed from the investigation with the accusation that he did not keep the details of the case confidential and revealed the names of people under investigation, including Forza Italia senator Giancarlo Pittelli and general Walter Lombardo Cretella. Another case that de Magistris was involved with is "Le Toghe Lucane" in Basilicata. One of the people to be questioned by de Magistris was Henry John Woodcock, a public prosecutor in Basilicata who himself prosecuted cases similar to those of de Magistris, who believed there was an "intertwining of a certain judiciary, a certain politics, freemasonry, and corruption", which in the words of then IdV group leader in the Senate Felice Belisario was not "an invention" of de Magistris and Woodcock. This 20-year case, which began in 2003, ultimately ended with thirty out of thirty dismissals in the first strand of the case, and then saw the definitive acquittal of Gaetano Bonomi, who had renounced to the statute of limitations.

Political offices
Preceded by Rosa Russo Iervolino	Mayor of Naples; 2011–2021	Succeeded by Gaetano Manfredi
