= Power to the People (Italy) =

Power to the People! Potere al Popolo!
- Abbreviation: PaP
- Spokespersons: Marta Collot; Giuliano Granato
- Founded: 18 November 2017
- Headquarters: Via Imbriani 218, Naples
- Membership (End of 2025): 3,655
- Ideology: Left-wing populism Euroscepticism; Anti-capitalism; Communism; Socialism of the 21st century
- Political position: Left-wing to far-left
- National affiliation: People's Union (2022–2024)
- International affiliation: International Peoples' Assembly
- Colours: Carmine red
- Slogan: Potere al Popolo!
- Chamber of Deputies: 0 / 400
- Senate of the Republic: 0 / 200
- European Parliament: 0 / 76
- Regional Councils: 0 / 896

Party flag

Website
- poterealpopolo.org

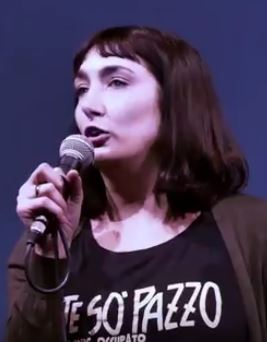
Viola Carofalo, former national spokesperson and leader

Power to the People! (Italian: Potere al Popolo!, PaP) is a political party in Italy. It was launched in December 2017 as a left-wing joint electoral list of anti-capitalist parties and movements which ran in the 2018 general election.

In its manifesto, PaP's membership is described as "social and political, anti-liberal and anti-capitalist, communist, socialist, environmentalist, feminist, secular, pacifist and southernist left-wing", whose goal as a coalition is "to create real democracy, through daily practices, self-governance experiments, socialisation of knowing and popular participation".

== History ==
The coalition was initially proposed by Ex OPG Je so' pazzo, a social centre in Naples. The proposal was endorsed by other social centers in the country, local committees and associations and finally some established parties whereas the idea of building a party and/or list was born during the Je so' pazzo Festival – 2016, which had as its name "Let's Build the Popular Power", held in Naples from 9 to 11 September 2016. The following year from 7 to 10 September 2017, there was in Naples the Je so' pazzo Festival – 2017, which had as its name "Power to the People!".

On 18 November 2017, Je so' pazzo's activists held a national assembly for the construction of a truly democratic movement that would give representation to social battles and to the ideas of individuals, social centers, associations and parties that felt themselves to be without representation. On 17 December, the coalition was officially launched with the support of the two main Italian communist parties, the Communist Refoundation Party (PRC) and the Italian Communist Party (PCI). Contextually, that same day Viola Carofalo, a Naples-based university researcher in philosophy who had been a long-time activist of Ex OPG Je so' pazzo, was chosen as national spokesperson and as political leader on 6 January 2018. In the 2018 general election on 4 March, PaP obtained 1.1% of the vote and no seats.

On 18 March, PaP held a national assembly in which it was decided to continue its program. In January 2019, PaP considered running either independently or in a wider coalition in the next European parliament election, but it ultimately decided not to run.

In July 2021 senator Matteo Mantero, elected with the Five Star Movement, joined the party, giving it representation in the Italian Parliament.

During the Autumn of 2025, PaP promoted and participated in the 2025 general strikes and protests for Gaza and later, in March 2026, in the Nuestra América Convoy to Cuba.

== Political positions and international relations ==
After its founding in December 2017, PaP took inspiration from Momentum, the organisation supporting Jeremy Corbyn's leadership of the Labour Party in the United Kingdom and La France Insoumise, whose leader Jean-Luc Mélenchon spoke of a "common adventure for the construction of a people's alternative for Europe". In April 2018, PaP "lent its support" to Maintenant le Peuple, an alternative European political alliance started by Mélenchon, Catarina Martins and Pablo Iglesias Turrión of the French La France Insoumise, Portuguese Left Bloc and Spanish Podemos respectively which was later joined by the Danish Red-Green Alliance, Finnish Left Alliance and Swedish Left Party. PaP called Maintenant le Peuple "a very important call proposed by three of the most popular alternatives from Europe [Left Bloc, Podemos and La France Insoumise], which we can not ignore".

At the same time, PaP is part of the International Peoples' Assembly, an international organisation grouping socialist forces such as the U.S. Party for Socialism and Liberation, the Brazilian Landless Workers' Movement, the Zambian Socialist Party (Zambia), the South African National Union of Metalworkers of South Africa, and the Palestinian People's Party.

PaP considers the European Union and NATO to be "warmonger" and claims that these organisation have provoked the Russo-Ukrainian conflict by supporting a "Nazi-led" government and its "ethnic cleansing" of Donbas. Particularly, PaP labels the Russian invasion of Ukraine (even though "unacceptable") as the last step of a "inter-imperialistic war" started by the West in 2014. In 2018, a PaP member joined a "humanitarian convoy" to Donbas and met the presidet of the Luhansk People's Republic, Leonid Pasechnik. Although critical to the Russian government, PaP opposes sanctions against Russia because "an act of war" targeting "civilians" and not "influent Western people" in league with "Russian cleptocrats." Moreover, the party is against any kind of military aid to Ukraine and opposes European rearmament.

PaP recognizes Nicolás Maduro as the legitimate president of Venezuela, criticizing the US intervention and calling for the release of Maduro and his wife.

PaP has criticized Israel for the Gaza genocide, supporting the Palestinian resistance groups and in particular the communist Popular Front for the Liberation of Palestine. Giorgo Cremaschi, national coordinator of PaP and its former spokesman, controversially denied that Hamas is a terrorist organization, highlighting that Hamas is formally recognized as terrorist only by Western countries.

=== Endorsements ===
At its birth when it was still an electoral list and not an organization, PaP has been endorsed by the following public figures:

- Sabina Guzzanti
- Vandana Shiva
- Citto Maselli
- Vauro Senesi
- Ken Loach
- Moni Ovadia
- Camila Vallejo
- Jean-Luc Mélenchon
- Sahra Wagenknecht
- Evo Morales

== Election results ==
=== Italian Parliament ===
Election	Leader	Chamber of Deputies				Senate of the Republic				Government
Election	Leader	Votes	%	Seats	+/–	Votes	%	Seats	+/–	Government
2018	Viola Carofalo	370,320	1.1	0 / 630	New	319,094	1.1	0 / 315	New	No seats
2018	Viola Carofalo	370,320	1.1	0 / 630	New	319,094	1.1	0 / 315	New	No seats
2018	Viola Carofalo	370,320	1.1	0 / 630	New	319,094	1.1	0 / 315	New	Opposition (Note: Senator Matteo Mantero, elected with the Five Star Movement, joined the party in July 2021) (2021–2022)
2022	Marta Collot; Giuliano Granato	Into UP		0 / 400	0	Into UP		0 / 200	0	No seats

=== Regional Councils ===
Region	Election year	Votes	%	Seats	+/−
South Tyrol	2018	1,753 (14th)	0.6	0 / 35	–
Lombardy	2023	39,913 (11th) (Note: Into People's Union.)	1.4	0 / 80	–
Emilia-Romagna	2020	8,048 (13th)	0.4	0 / 50	–
Umbria	2019	1,345 (16th)	0.3	0 / 21	–
Lazio	2023	10,289 (14th)	0.7	0 / 51	–
Campania	2020	26,711 (18th)	1.1	0 / 49	–
Campania	2025	40.743 (13th)	2.03	0 / 50	–
Toscana	2025	57.250 (6th)	4.51	0 / 50	–

== Leadership ==
- National spokesperson: Viola Carofalo (17 December 2017 – 12 May 2021); Giorgio Cremaschi (12 January 2019 – 12 May 2021); Giuliano Granato (12 May 2021 – present); Marta Collot (12 May 2021 – present)

== Logos ==
PaP used different logos:

Preliminary logo

Electoral logo
