= Free and Equal (Italy) =

Free and Equal Liberi e Uguali
- Leader: Pietro Grasso (Note: Leader of the coalition in the 2018 Italian election.)
- Founded: 3 December 2017
- Dissolved: 13 October 2022
- Ideology: Social democracy Democratic socialism
- Political position: Center-left to left-wing

Website
- liberieuguali.it

Free and Equal (Italian: Liberi e Uguali, LeU) was a left-wing electoral list and parliamentary group in the Chamber of Deputies and a sub-group in the Senate, the two houses of the Italian Parliament. LeU was launched on 3 December 2017 as a federation of political parties including Article 1, Italian Left and Possible. The leader of the alliance for the 2018 general election was Pietro Grasso, former President of the Senate and former anti-Mafia prosecutor. The three founding parties left the alliance in late 2018, but LeU continued to exist in Parliament. Following the 2021 Italian government crisis, LeU had a single minister, Roberto Speranza, in the national unity government of Prime Minister Mario Draghi.

== History ==
=== Background ===
Since the 2013 leadership election of the Democratic Party (PD), in which Matteo Renzi (a centrist) was elected secretary, the party was riven by an internal struggle between Renzi's large majority (composed of renziani, assorted centrists and moderate social democrats) and the left-wing factions which were very critical of Renzi, his government (2014–2016) and his proposed constitutional reform, which was finally voted down in a constitutional referendum in December 2016.

After the splits of Possible (Pos.) and Future to the Left (FaS), Enrico Rossi (leader of the Democratic Socialists faction and President of Tuscany) and Roberto Speranza (leader of Reformist Area and former PD leader in the Chamber of Deputies) became the leaders of the PD's internal left. They were backed by former DS and PD leaders Massimo D'Alema, Pier Luigi Bersani and Guglielmo Epifani. Rossi and Speranza criticised Renzi on many of his policies and were initially joined by Michele Emiliano, President of Apulia. In February 2017, the dissidents (except Emiliano, who stayed in the PD and would unsuccessfully challenge Renzi in the upcoming 2017 leadership election), and a group of SI splinters led by Arturo Scotto (a former DS member too) launched the Article 1 – Democratic and Progressive Movement (MDP), a month after the merger of Left Ecology Freedom (SEL), FaS and minor groups into Italian Left (SI).

=== Road to the new alliance ===
Soon after the foundation of the MDP, Roberto Speranza (MDP coordinator), Nicola Fratoianni (SI secretary) and Giuseppe Civati (Pos. secretary) discussed the opportunity of forming a left-wing coalition as an alternative to the centre-left led by the PD, the centre-right and the Five Star Movement (M5S).

In the 2017 Sicilian regional election, the three left-wing parties, along with the Communist Refoundation Party, other parties and groups, ran in a joint list named One Hundred Steps for Sicily with Claudio Fava for President. Fava won 6.2% of the vote, the list 5.2% and only Fava was elected deputy in the Regional Assembly.

During a convention in Rome on 3 December 2017, the MDP–SI–Pos alliance was officially established as Free and Equal (LeU) and Pietro Grasso, President of the Senate and former anti-Mafia prosecutor, was appointed leader and candidate for Prime Minister in the 2018 general election. A few weeks later, also Laura Boldrini, President of the Chamber of Deputies (who had been elected as an independent of SEL in 2013), joined LeU. Another high-profile adherent was Rossella Muroni, who had been the president of Legambiente up to then. In January, LeU was joined also by the Greens of South Tyrol.

=== 2018 general election and dissolution ===
In January 2018, shortly before the election, some internal conflict started, with Grasso accused to be uncharismatic and uninfluential on alliance politics.

In March, LeU obtained 3.4% of the vote in the general election, well below expectations and opinion polls, electing 14 deputies and 4 senators.

In May, LeU launched a constituent assembly in Rome with the participation of the MDP, SI and Possible, which agreed on the creation of a party with a single structure and an internal voting system on political issues. In June, the national committee of LeU fixed the founding congress for December. The following day, Beatrice Brignone, who had replaced Civati as secretary of Possible, announced the departure of her party from the alliance.

More internal conflicts broke out between the two remaining parties (MDP and SI) during the summer, especially about political affiliations for the upcoming 2019 European Parliament election and possible alliance with the PD. Between October and December, LeU was successively abandoned by SI and the MDP (focused on the formation of a new "red-green" party) as well as by high-profile members like Boldrini and Muroni.

In January 2019, SI returned into LeU's fold and joined forces with LeU individual members, led by Francesco Laforgia and deputy Luca Pastorino (dissident members of MDP and Possible, respectively), who had formed an association named #Per i molti (For the many), which was later transformed into ÈViva party. In April the two groups, along with the Communist Refoundation Party (PRC) and minor parties, formed The Left, a joint list inspired by the Party of the European Left (PEL). Contextually, the MDP, which was renamed simply "Article One" (Art.1), decided to run with the PD, while Possible joined the FdV-led Green Europe (EV).

=== Government participation ===
In August 2019, tensions grew within the coalition supporting the Giuseppe Conte's first government, leading to the issuing of a motion of no-confidence by the League. During the following government crisis, the national board of the PD officially opened to the possibility of forming a new cabinet in a coalition with the M5S, based on pro-Europeanism, green economy, sustainable development, fight against economic inequality and a new immigration policy. The party also accepted that Conte might continue at the head of a new government, and on 29 August President Mattarella formally invested Conte to do so. The LeU groups had previously already announced their possible support to Conte's second government, which was finally unveiled in September with the appointment of Speranza as Minister of Health.

Following Conte's resignation in January 2021 and the resulting government crisis, LeU joined Mario Draghi's national unity government, with Speranza keeping his ministerial role. The new government provoked shifts within the group. Italian Left chose not to support Draghi, was deserted by one deputy (Erasmo Palazzotto, who voted in favour and left the party) and one senator (Loredana De Petris, who voted in favour, but remained a member) and was joined by two formerly independent senators (Paola Nugnes, who had been elected with the Five Star Movement (M5S) and later aligned with the Communist Refoundation Party) and Elena Fattori (another former Five Star). Additionally, Rossella Muroni (Green Italia) left the group in order to establish a sub-group of the Federation of the Greens within the Mixed Group instead. In July, Devis Dori, another splinter from the M5S, briefly joined LeU in the Chamber, as, in February 2022, he would join EV instead. In March 2022, also Palazzotto left LeU, leaving it with ten deputies.

== Composition ==
=== Founding member parties ===
Party	Main ideology	Leader
Democratic and Progressive Movement (MDP)	Social democracy	Roberto Speranza
Italian Left (SI)	Democratic socialism	Nicola Fratoianni
Possible (Pos)	Progressivism	Giuseppe Civati

=== Other participating parties ===
Party	Main ideology	Leader/s
Greens of South Tyrol (VGV)	Green politics	Brigitte Foppa and Hans Heiss
Sicilian Socialist Party (PSS)	Democratic socialism	Antonio Matasso

=== Parliamentary groups ===
Party	Main ideology	Deputies	Senators	Total MPs
Article One (Art.1) (Note: Deputies Pier Luigi Bersani, Federico Conte, Rina De Lorenzo, Federico Fornaro, Roberto Speranza, Nico Stumpo and Maria Flavia Timbro; Senator Vasco Errani.)	Social democracy	7	1	8
èViva (Note: Deputy Luca Pastorino; Senator Francesco Laforgia.)	Eco-socialism	1	1	2
Italian Left (SI) (Note: Deputy Nicola Fratoianni.)	Democratic socialism	1	0	1
Fatherland and Constitution (PeC) (Note: Deputy Stefano Fassina.)	Left-wing nationalism	1	0	1
Independents (Note: Senators Maurizio Buccarella, Loredana De Petris, Pietro Grasso and Sandro Ruotolo.)		0	4	4
Totals		10	6	16

== Election results ==
=== Italian Parliament ===
Election	Leader	Chamber of Deputies				Senate of the Republic			
Election	Leader	Votes	%	Seats	Position	Votes	%	Seats	Position
2018	Pietro Grasso	1,114,799	3.39	14 / 630	6th	991,159	3.28	4 / 315	6th

=== Regional Councils ===
Region	Election year	Votes	%	Seats	+/−
Piedmont	2019	46,570 (7th) (Note: In a joint list with FdV.)	2.42	1 / 51	▲1
Friuli-Venezia Giulia	2018	11,748 (10th)	2.78	1 / 49	▲1
Lombardy	2018	111,296 (7th)	2.12	0 / 80	–
South Tyrol	2018	19,391 (4th) (Note: As the Greens.)	6.86	3 / 35	–
Trentino	2018	3,560 (15th)	1.40	0 / 35	–
Emilia-Romagna	2020	81,419 (6th) (Note: As Brave Emilia-Romagna.)	3.77	2 / 50	–
Umbria	2019	6,727 (9th) (Note: As Green Civic Left with PRC.)	1.61	0 / 21	–
Lazio	2018	88,416 (8th)	3.48	1 / 50	▲1
Abruzzo	2019	16,614 (9th)	2.77	0 / 31	–
Molise	2018	4,784 (10th)	3.39	0 / 21	–
Sicily	2017	100,583 (9th)	5.23	1 / 70	▲1
Sardinia	2019	27,077 (9th)	3.79	2 / 60	▲2

== Symbols ==
2017–2018

2018–2022
