= Roberto Speranza =

Italian politician (born 1979)

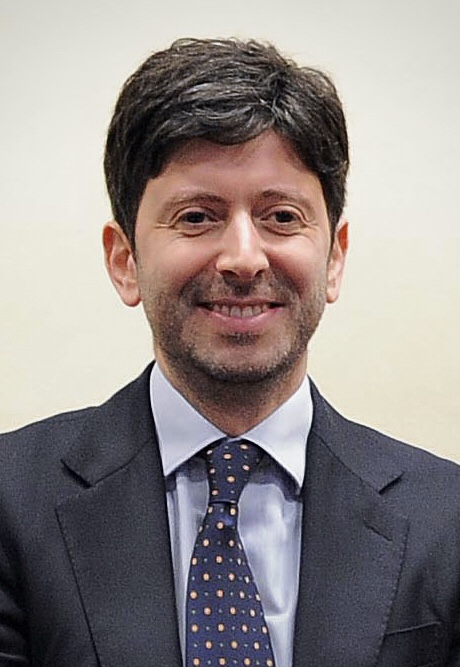

Minister of Health
- In office 5 September 2019 – 22 October 2022
- Prime Minister: Giuseppe Conte; Mario Draghi
- Preceded by: Giulia Grillo
- Succeeded by: Orazio Schillaci

Secretary of Article One
- In office 7 April 2019 – 10 June 2023
- Preceded by: Office established
- Succeeded by: Party dissolved

Coordinator of Article One
- In office 25 February 2017 – 7 April 2019
- Preceded by: Office established
- Succeeded by: Arturo Scotto

Member of the Chamber of Deputies
- Incumbent
- Assumed office 15 March 2013
- Constituency: Basilicata (2013–2018); Tuscany (2018–2022); Campania 1 (since 2022)

Personal details
- Born: 4 January 1979 (age 47) Potenza, Italy
- Party: Democratic Party (2007–2017; since 2023)
- Other political affiliations: DS (2005–2007); Art.1 (2017–2023)
- Height: 1.75 m (5 ft 9 in)
- Spouse: Rosangela Cossidente (m. 2015)
- Children: 2
- Education: Luiss Guido Carli

Roberto Speranza (born 4 January 1979) is an Italian politician of the Chamber of Deputies who served as national secretary of Article One. From 5 September 2019 until 22 October 2022, he has been serving as Minister of Health in the government of Prime Minister Giuseppe Conte and was later confirmed by Prime Minister Mario Draghi. During his tenure, he had to face the COVID-19 pandemic, which deeply affected Italy.

== Early life and education ==
Roberto Speranza was born in Potenza, Basilicata, in 1979. During the 2000s, he graduated in political science at the Luiss Guido Carli of Rome.

== Political career ==
=== Early political career ===
In 2005 Speranza was elected to the national executive of the Left Youth (SG), a youth wing of the Democrats of the Left (DS), the main social-democratic party in Italy. At the age of 25, Speranza was elected city councilor with the DS in Potenza, a position he held from 2004 to 2009. In March 2007 he was elected national president of the Left Youth. While in October of the same year he was appointed in the national constituent of the Democratic Party (PD), the new centre-left party, born from the union between DS and The Daisy.

In February 2008 Speranza was appointed by PD's secretary Walter Veltroni to the national committee of Young Democrats, with the task of creating the new youth organization of the Democratic Party. On 9 November 2009 he was elected regional secretary of the PD for Basilicata.

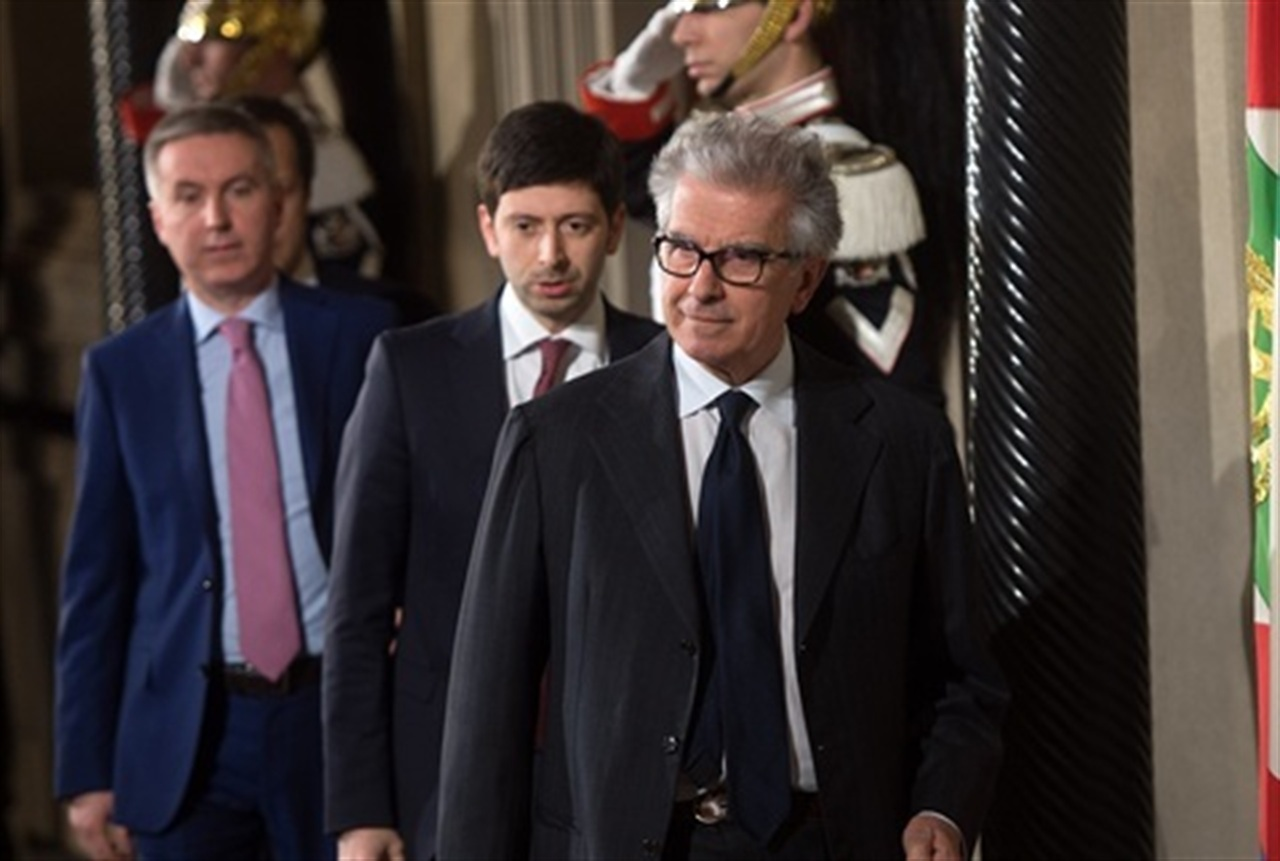
Speranza with Luigi Zanda and Lorenzo Guerini at the Quirinal Palace

After supporting Pier Luigi Bersani in the 2012 primary election for the choice of the centre-left candidate for Prime Minister in the 2013 general election, he was selected by Bersani to coordinate his 2013 electoral campaign. The centre-left alliance Italy Common Good obtained a clear majority of seats in the Chamber of Deputies, thanks to a majority bonus that has effectively trebled the number of seats assigned to the winning force, while in the popular vote it narrowly defeated the centre-right alliance of former Prime Minister Silvio Berlusconi. Close behind, the new anti-establishment Five Star Movement of comedian Beppe Grillo became the third force, clearly ahead of the centrist coalition of outgoing Prime Minister Mario Monti. In the Senate, no political group or party won an outright majority, resulting in a hung parliament. Speranza was elected to the Chamber of Deputies in Basilicata's electoral constituency.

On 19 March 2013 Speranza was elected leader of the PD in the Chamber of Deputies. Speranza obtained 200 votes among the democratic deputies, the nil have been about thirty and the white ones 53. He later announced his resignation on 15 April 2015, in disagreement with PD's new leader and Prime Minister Matteo Renzi, after government's decision to put approve with a confidence vote the new electoral law, the so-called Italicum.

=== Article One's leader ===
On 20 February 2017 he left the Democratic Party along with other representatives, including former secretary Pier Luigi Bersani, due to a heated debate with the pro-Renzi majority. Five days later, together with Arturo Scotto, Enrico Rossi, Vasco Errani and Pier Luigi Bersani, he created a new party called Article One – Democratic and Progressive Movement, made up of parliamentarians who had exited from the Democratic Party and the Italian Left (SI). In April 2017 he became national coordinator of Article One – MDP.

In the run-up of the 2018 general election, Article One joined a left-wing alliance with SI and other minor leftist parties, named Free and Equal (LeU), under the leadership of Pietro Grasso, incumbent President of the Senate and former anti-mafia magistrate. In the election, LeU obtained only 3.4% of votes, but Speranza succeeding in being re-elected deputy in the Tuscany constituency. On 6 April 2019 Speranza was elected Secretary of Article One.

=== Minister of Health ===
In August 2019 tensions grew within the populist government, leading to the issuing of a motion of no-confidence on Prime Minister Giuseppe Conte by the League. After Conte's resignation, the national board of the PD officially opened to the possibility of forming a new cabinet in a coalition with the M5S, based on pro-Europeanism, green economy, sustainable development, fight against economic inequality and a new immigration policy. The party also accepted that Conte may continue at the head of a new government, and on 29 August President Sergio Mattarella formally invested Conte to do so. Free and Equal decided to support the new government and Speranza was appointed new Minister of Health. He was labeled as the most left-leaning Health Minister in Italian history.

==== COVID-19 pandemic ====
In February 2020, Italy became one of the world's main centres for confirmed cases of COVID-19, a respiratory disease caused by the SARS-CoV-2 virus that originated in China. As of January 2021, more than 2,250,000 coronavirus cases and 78,000 deaths were confirmed, affecting mainly Lombardy, Emilia-Romagna, Veneto and Piedmont.

In late January, the government banned all flights from and to China, becoming the first European country to adopt this measure. On 22 February, the Council of Ministers announced a bill to contain the COVID-19 outbreak, quarantining more than 50,000 people from 11 different municipalities in Northern Italy. Prime Minister Conte stated: "In the outbreak areas, entry and exit will not be provided. Suspension of work activities and sport events has already been ordered in those areas."

Schools were closed in 10 municipalities in Lombardy, one in Veneto and in Emilia-Romagna. In some areas, all public events were cancelled and commercial activities were halted. Regional train services suspended the stops in the most affected areas – with trains not stopping at Codogno, Maleo and Casalpusterlengo stations. Universities in Lombardy suspended all activities from 23 February. After few days, schools and universities closed in the whole country.

On 24 February, Speranza appointed Walter Ricciardi, a member of World Health Organization's executive committee and former president of Italian National Institute of Health, as a special adviser for relations between Italy and international health organisations.

On 8 March 2020, Prime Minister Conte extended the quarantine to all of Lombardy and 14 other northern provinces, putting more than a quarter of the national population under lockdown. On the following day, he announced in a press conference that all measures previously applied only in the so-called "red zones" had been extended to the whole country, putting de facto 60 million people in lockdown. He later proceeded to officially sign the executive decree. This measure was described as the largest lockdown in human history.

On 20 March, Minister Speranza ordered tighter regulations on free movement. The new measures banned open-air sports and running, except individually and in close proximity of one's residence. Parks, playgrounds and public green were closed down. Furthermore, movement across the country was further restricted, by banning "any movement towards a residence different from the main one", including holiday homes, during weekends and holidays. While on the following day, Conte announced further restrictions within the nationwide lockdown, by halting all non-essential production, industries and businesses in Italy, following the rise in the number of new cases and deaths in the previous days.

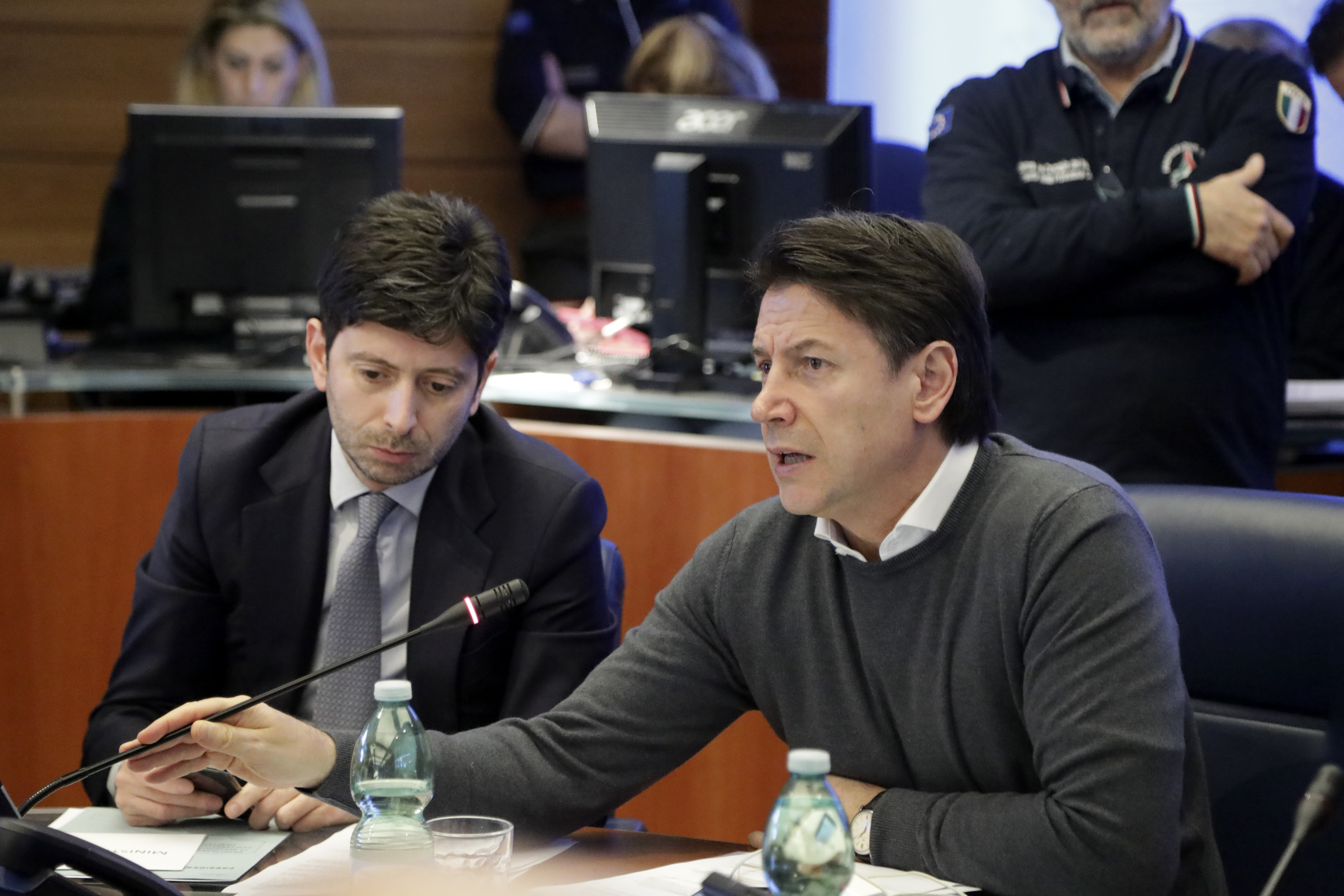
Speranza and Conte during the crisis

On 24 March, in a live-streamed press conference, Prime Minister Conte announced a new decree approved by the Council of Ministers. The decree imposed higher fines for the violation of the restrictive measures, and a regulation of the relationship between government and Parliament during the emergency. It included also the possibility of reducing or suspending public and private transport, and gave the regional governments power to impose additional restrictive regulations in their Regions for a maximum of seven days before being confirmed by national decree.

On 1 April, the government extended the period of lockdown until 13 April. While on 6 April, Conte announced a new economic stimulus plan, consisting of €200 billion of state-guaranteed loans to companies and additional €200 billion of guarantees to support exports. On 10 April, Conte made further announcements extending the lockdown until 3 May, allowing some specific businesses, like bookstores and silviculture activities, to reopen under specific safe measures.

On 26 April, Conte and Speranza announced the so-called "Phase 2", that would start from 4 May. Movements across regions were still forbidden, while the ones between municipalities and provinces were allowed only for work and health reasons as well as for visit relatives. Moreover, he allowed the re-opening of closed factories, but schools, bars, restaurants and barbers were still closed. On 18 May, the lockdown officially ended and the government allowed the re-openings of bars, restaurants, barbers and gyms. However, travels across regions were still limited.

On 1 June, the Ministry of Health launched the Immuni App ("Immune App"), a contact-tracing app, designed to help Italy manage the so-called "Phase 2" of the coronavirus crisis. The app aimed to notify users at risk of carrying the virus as early as possible, even when they were asymptomatic. These users can then self-isolate to avoid infecting others. Despite harsh criticism from the opposition, which accused the government of establishing an Orwell-like Big Brother, in the first two days the app was downloaded by more than a million people.

On 16 August, after an increasing in the daily number of cases, Minister Speranza closed all the discos and night clubs of the country and imposed to wear a mask outdoors in some areas, considered at risk of crowding.

== Personal life ==
Since 2015, Speranza has been married with Rosangela Cossidente, with whom he has two children, Michele Simon and Emma Iris. He is a fervent supporter of AS Roma.

== Electoral history ==
Election	House	Constituency	Party	Votes	Result
2013	Chamber of Deputies	Basilicata	PD	– (Note: Elected in a closed list proportional representation system.)	Elected
2018	Chamber of Deputies	Tuscany	LeU	–	Elected
2022	Chamber of Deputies	Campania 1	PD–IDP	–	Elected

Political offices
Preceded by Giulia Grillo	Italian Minister of Health; 2019–2022	Succeeded by Orazio Schillaci
Party political offices
New party	Secretary of Article One; 2019–2023	Party dissolved
