= Democratic Party – Democratic and Progressive Italy =

Italian centre-left electoral list

Democratic Party – Democratic and Progressive Italy Partito Democratico – Italia Democratica e Progressista
- Leader: Elly Schlein
- Founder: Enrico Letta
- Founded: 29 July 2022
- Ideology: Social democracy
- Political position: Centre-left
- National affiliation: Centre-left coalition
- Member parties: PD; Art.1; PSI; CpE; DemoS; MRE; Volt; BASE; GI; èViva; ERC; CON; For Apulia
- Chamber of Deputies: 68 / 400
- Senate: 36 / 205

Website
- elezioni2022.partitodemocratico.it

Democratic Party – Democratic and Progressive Italy (Italian: Partito Democratico – Italia Democratica e Progressista; PD–IDP) is the parliamentary group of the Democratic Party (PD) and minor allied parties in the Chamber of Deputies and the Senate of the Republic, formed in October 2022. Prior to the formation of the group, its name was that of the lead electoral list of the centre-left coalition in the 2022 Italian general election.

== History ==
In July 2022, the centre-right coalition was forecast to win a parliamentary absolute majority under the Rosatellum electoral law of 2017, which was pushed by the Democratic Party (PD) under Matteo Renzi's leadership and was now rejected by the party under the leadership of Enrico Letta. Some early opinion polling for the 2022 Italian general election showed that the only way to avoid a right-wing alliance victory was the formation of a large big tent coalition including the PD, minor left-wing and centrist parties, and the PD's 2019–2021 government ally, the Five Star Movement (M5S). As the PD blamed the M5S for causing the fall of Mario Draghi's government, an alliance was excluded from both sides, despite some pressure from the left to maintain the PD–M5S alliance. They remained allies at the regional level, such as in Liguria and Sicily, though not without criticism and issues.

On 29 July, Letta announced the formation of a joint list between the PD, Article One (Art.1), the Italian Socialist Party (PSI), and Solidary Democracy (DemoS) in the upcoming general election, and was officially founded that same day. Other minor parties joined later. In early August 2022, Action and More Europe formed a political pact with the PD that would have given 3 candidates in single-seat constituencies to them for every 7 candidates given to the PD. When the PD signed a pact with the Greens and Left Alliance (formed by Green Europe and Italian Left) and Civic Commitment (led by Luigi Di Maio and Bruno Tabacci), Calenda said he was walking away from the pact. This decision cast doubts over the federation with More Europe, which continued their alliance with the PD. In the election on 25 September, the centre-left coalition led by the PD–IP slightly improved its 2018 results in terms of vote share and seats in percentage, polling 19%. Due to the first-past-the-post part of the voting, the centre-right took advantage of a divided left and centre to obtain an absolute majority of seats.

Having soon conceded the election, Letta announced his resignation as party secretary, and he said that the PD–IP would provide a "strong and intransigent opposition". After the 2022 Italian government formation and the establishment of the Meloni Cabinet, the PD–IDP became a parliamentary group at the opposition level and voted against Giorgia Meloni's government in the confidence vote in both houses of the Italian Parliament on 25–26 October.

== Composition ==
=== Founding member parties ===
Party	Main ideology	Leader
Democratic Party (PD)	Social democracy	Enrico Letta
Article One (Art.1) (Note: Merged into the Democratic Party in June 2023)	Social democracy	Roberto Speranza
Italian Socialist Party (PSI) (Note: Left to join forces with United States of Europe in March 2024)	Social democracy	Enzo Maraio
Centrists for Europe (CpE)	Christian democracy	Pier Ferdinando Casini
Solidary Democracy (DemoS)	Christian left	Paolo Ciani
European Republicans Movement (MRE) (Note: Left to join forces with Action in March 2024)	Social liberalism	Luciana Sbarbati
Volt Italia (Volt)	Social liberalism	Gianluca Guerra, Eliana Canavesio
Base Italia (BASE)	Liberalism	Marco Bentivogli
Green Italia (GI) (Note: Merged into the Democratic Party in April 2023)	Green politics	Annalisa Corrado, Carmine Maturo
èViva (Note: Merged into the Democratic Party in May 2023)	Eco-socialism	Francesco Laforgia

=== Regional partners ===
Party	Main ideology	Leader
Brave Emilia-Romagna (ERC) (Note: Merged into the Democratic Party in February 2023)	Progressivism	Elly Schlein
With Emiliano (CON)	Regionalism	Alessandro Delli Noci
For Apulia	Regionalism	Sebastiano Leo

=== Parliamentary groups ===
Party	Main ideology	Deputies	Senators	Total MPs
Democratic Party (PD)	Social democracy	67	35	102
Solidary Democracy (DemoS)	Christian left	1	0	1
Centrists for Europe (CpE)	Christian democracy	0	1	1
Totals		68	36	104

== Electoral results ==
=== Italian Parliament ===
Election	Leader	Chamber of Deputies					Senate of the Republic					Government
Election	Leader	Votes	%	Seats	+/–	Position	Votes	%	Seats	+/–	Position	Government
2022	Enrico Letta	5,654,781	19.04	69 / 400	New	2nd	5,600,417	18.93	40 / 200	New	2nd	Opposition
