= Make the PD =

Make the PD (Fare il PD) was short-lived social-democratic faction within the Democratic Party (PD), a political party in Italy.

The faction was launched in July 2013 during a convention, which saw the participation of the bulk of the supporters of former secretary Pier Luigi Bersani, who largely opposed Matteo Renzi's rise within the party. The manifesto of "Make the PD" was signed by Stefano Fassina, Floriana Casellato, Micaela Campana, Alfredo D'Attorre and Maurizio Martina, and was supposed to provide the ideological base for a bid to the party's leadership by Fassina.

In fact, the movement never became a stable faction within the party and its members finally supported Gianni Cuperlo in the 2013 leadership election.
