= 2018 President of the Italian Senate election =

- 23—24 March 2018

First ballot: Majority of the entire membership needed to win 321 members, 161 votes needed to win Last (third) ballot: Majority of votes cast needed to win 319 members voting, 160 needed to win
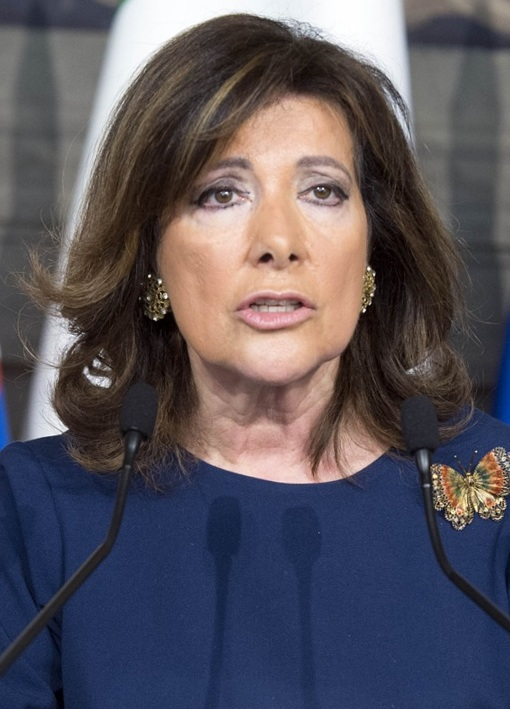

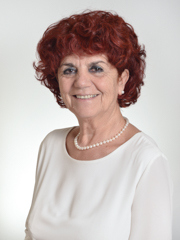
	Majority party	Minority party
Candidate	Maria Elisabetta Alberti Casellati	Valeria Fedeli
Party	Forza Italia	Democratic Party
Seat	Venice (Note: Formally multi-member electoral district no. 01 of Veneto (Italian: collegio elettorale uninominale Veneto - 01))	Benevento, Caserta and Avellino (Note: Formally multi-member electoral district no. 03 of Campania (Italian: collegio elettorale uninominale Campania - 03))
First ballot	0 (0.00%)	0 (0.00%)
Third ballot	240 (75.23%)	54 (16.92%)
President of the Senate before election
Pietro Grasso
Free and Equal
Elected President of the Senate
Maria Elisabetta Alberti Casellati
Forza Italia

The election for the President of the Senate of the Republic who would serve through the legislature XVIII of Italy took place on 23 and 24 March 2018, over three weeks after the 2018 Italian general election. It took place by secret ballot, as required by the assembly's standing orders. Former President of Italy Giorgio Napolitano, being the oldest Senator present, served as the acting presiding officer.

Following an agreement between the centre-right coalition and the Five Star Movement, Maria Elisabetta Alberti Casellati became the first woman to be elected to the office.

== Procedure ==
The election takes place by secret ballot, as required by the assembly's standing orders. Pursuant to the current rules of procedure, an absolute majority of the whole membership is needed to win on the first ballot. On the second and third ballot, a simple majority of votes cast (including blank ballots among the totals) suffices. If the first three ballots fail to deliver a winner, a runoff is held between the two candidates who got the most votes on the third ballot, with votes for any other candidate deemed invalid and blank ballots not included among the totals. In the event of a tie, the oldest candidate is deemed to have been elected.

== Results ==
=== First ballot ===
Candidate	Party	Votes
Emma Bonino	More Europe	1
Roberto Calderoli	Lega	1
Fabio Di Micco	Five Star Movement	1
Giorgio Napolitano	Independent	1
Paolo Romani	Forza Italia	1
Blank votes		312
Did not vote		4
Needed to win		161 (Note: a majority of members)

=== Second ballot ===
Candidate	Party	Votes
Anna Maria Bernini	Forza Italia	57
Emma Bonino	More Europe	2
Roberto Calderoli	Lega	1
Giorgio Napolitano	Independent	1
Blank votes		255
Invalid votes		3
Did not vote		3
Needed to win		161

=== Third ballot ===
Candidate	Party	Votes
Maria Elisabetta Alberti Casellati	Forza Italia	240
Valeria Fedeli	Democratic Party	54
Roberto Calderoli	Lega	3
Roberta Pinotti	Democratic Party	2
Liliana Segre	Independent	2
Maurizio Gasparri	Forza Italia	1
Paolo Romani	Forza Italia	1
Luigi Zanda	Democratic Party	1
Blank votes		14
Invalid votes		1
Did not vote		3
Needed to win		160 (Note: a majority of members present)

== See also ==
- 2018 President of the Italian Chamber of Deputies election
