= Fatherland and Constitution =

Fatherland and Constitution Patria e Costituzione
- Leader: Stefano Fassina
- Founded: 8 September 2018
- Split from: Italian Left
- Ideology: Souverainism; Euroscepticism; Left-wing nationalism
- Political position: Left-wing
- National affiliation: Free and Equal
- Colors: Red

Website
- patriaecostituzione.it

Fatherland and Constitution (Italian: Patria e Costituzione, PeC) is a left-wing souverainist political association in Italy. It was founded in September 2018 by Stefano Fassina, a member of the Chamber of Deputies for Free and Equal.

Fassina is an Italian economist and was a former member of left-wing, pro-Europeanist Democratic Party (PD). He later assumed more critical views on the European Union (UE), formed Future to the Left (FaS) and was a founding member of Italian Left (SI) in 2015. Fassina has proposed a "controlled disintegration of the Eurozone".

In September 2019, PeC supported the formation of the second government of Giuseppe Conte, composed by the Five Star Movement, PD and LeU.

== Leadership ==
- Leader: Stefano Fassina (2018–present)
