= 2018 President of the Italian Chamber of Deputies election =

- 23—24 March 2018

First ballot: 2/3 of the entire membership 630 members, 420 votes needed to win Final (fourth) ballot: a majority of members present 620 members present, 311 votes needed to win
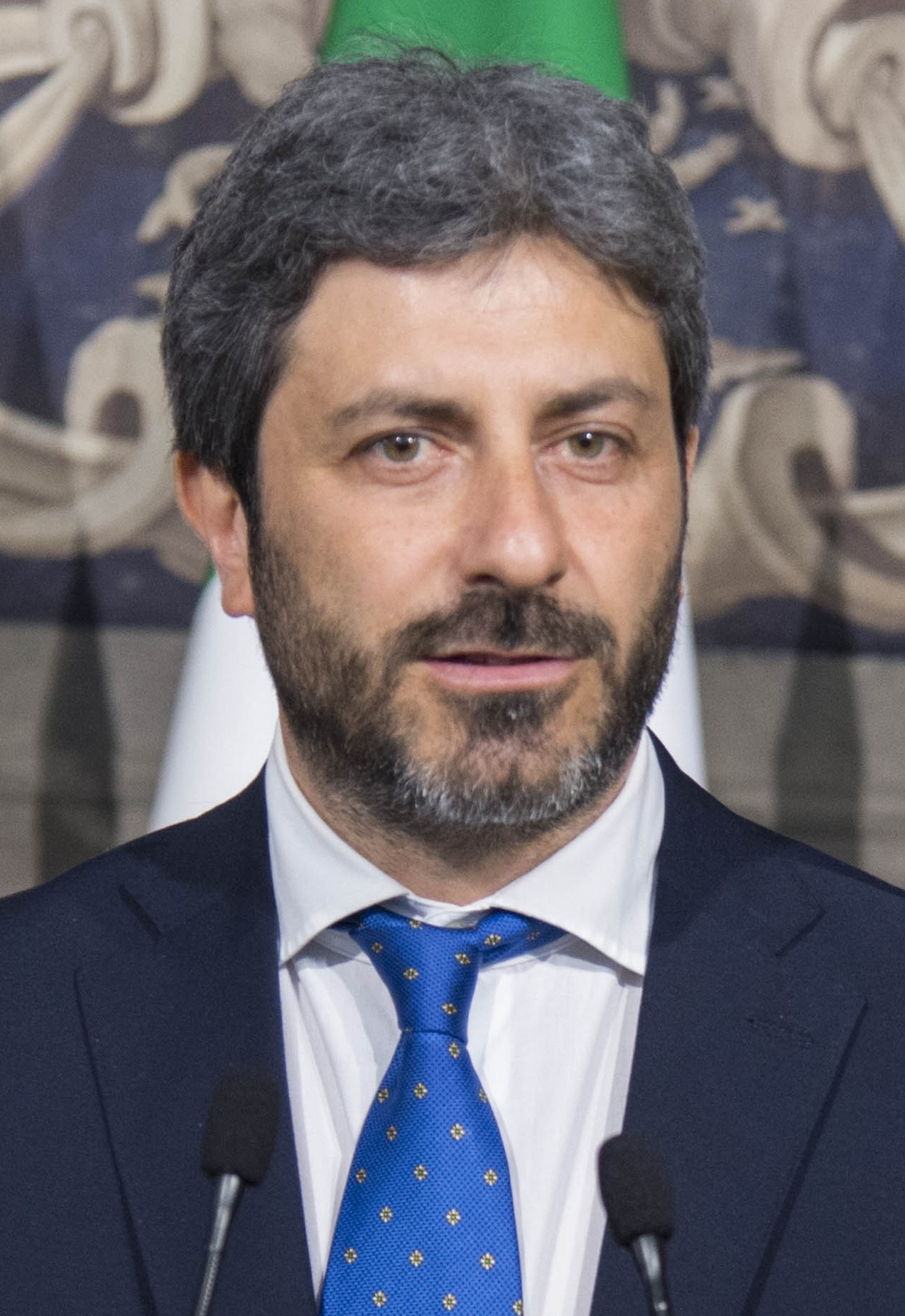

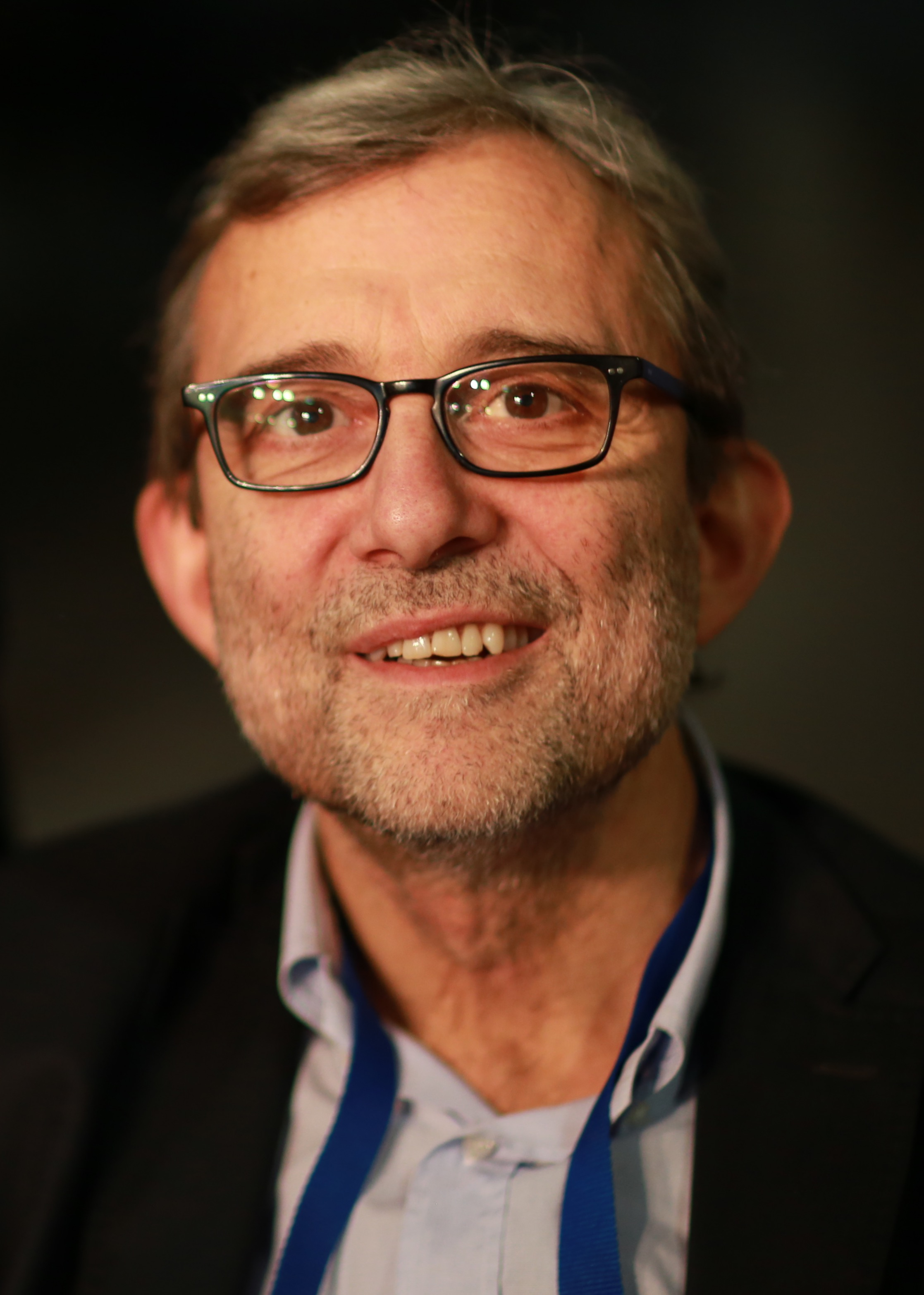
	Majority party	Minority party
Candidate	Roberto Fico	Roberto Giachetti
Party	Five Star Movement	Democratic Party
Seat	Naples-Fuorigrotta (Note: Formally single-member electoral district no. 08 of Emilia-Romagna (Italian: collegio elettorale uninominale Campania 1 - 08))	Sesto Fiorentino (Note: Formally single-member electoral district no. 03 of Tuscany 3 (Italian: collegio elettorale uninominale Toscana 3 - 03))
First ballot	0 (0.00%)	0 (0.00%)
Fourth ballot	422 (68.06%)	102 (16.45%)
President before election
Laura Boldrini
Free and Equal
Elected President
Roberto Fico
Five Star Movement

The election of the President of the Chamber of Deputies who would serve through the legislature XVIII of Italy took place on 23 and 24 March 2018, weeks after the 2022 Italian general election. Roberto Fico was elected on the fourth ballot following an agreement between the Five Star Movement and the centre-right coalition.

== Procedure ==
The election takes place by secret ballot. A two-thirds supermajority of the whole membership is needed to win on the first ballot. On the second and third ballot, a two-thirds supermajority of votes cast (including blank ballots among the totals) suffices. Starting from the fourth ballot, the threshold is further lowered to a simple majority of members present.

== Results ==
=== First ballot ===
Candidate	Party	Votes
Renato Brunetta	Forza Italia	2
Rossella Muroni	Free and Equal	2
Nico Stumpo	Free and Equal	2
Others		4
Blank votes		592
Invalid votes		18
Did not vote		10
Needed to win		420 (Note: 2/3 of members)

=== Second ballot ===
Candidate	Party	Votes
Davide Tripiedi	Five Star Movement	4
Dario Bond	Five Star Movement	3
Nico Stumpo	Free and Equal	3
Renato Brunetta	Forza Italia	2
David Ermini	Democratic Italy	2
Rossella Muroni	Free and Equal	2
Others		12
Blank votes		577
Invalid votes		6
Did not vote		19
Needed to win		408 (Note: 2/3 of members present)

=== Third ballot ===
Candidate	Party	Votes
Nico Stumpo	Free and Equal	7
David Ermini	Democratic Party	3
Rosa Menga	Five Star Movement	3
Others		18
Blank votes		569
Invalid votes		4
Did not vote		26
Needed to win		408

=== Fourth ballot ===
Candidate	Party	Votes
Roberto Fico	Five Star Movement	422
Roberto Giachetti	Democratic Party	102
Riccardo Fraccaro	Five Star Movement	7
Renato Brunetta	Forza Italia	3
Others		5
Blank votes		60
Invalid votes		21
Did not vote		10
Needed to win		311 (Note: a majority of members present)

== See also ==
- 2018 President of the Italian Senate election
