= Article One (political party) =

Italian political party

Article One Articolo Uno
- Abbreviation: Art.1
- Secretary: Roberto Speranza
- Coordinator: Arturo Scotto
- Founded: 25 February 2017
- Dissolved: 10 June 2023
- Split from: Democratic Party
- Merged into: Democratic Party
- Headquarters: Via Zanardelli 34, Rome
- Youth wing: Youth Movement of the Left
- Ideology: Social democracy Democratic socialism
- Political position: Centre-left to left-wing
- National affiliation: Electoral list: Free and Equal (2018–2022); Democratic Party (2019); Democratic Party–IDP (2022); Coalition: Centre-left coalition
- European affiliation: Party of European Socialists (observer)
- European Parliament group: Progressive Alliance of Socialists and Democrats
- Colours: Red Green

Website
- articolo1mdp.it

Article One (Italian: Articolo Uno, Art.1), officially Article 1 – Democratic and Progressive Movement (Articolo 1 – Movimento Democratico e Progressista, Art.1–MDP), was a social-democratic political party in Italy. From 2019 to 2022, Art.1 leader Roberto Speranza served as Minister of Health in the second Conte government and the Draghi government.

Art.1 was formed in February 2017 by a left-wing split from the Democratic Party (PD), and soon joined by a group of splinters from Italian Left (SI). The party was led by its secretary Roberto Speranza. Among its leading members were former prime minister Massimo D'Alema, former PD secretaries Pier Luigi Bersani and Guglielmo Epifani, and Arturo Scotto. Enrico Rossi, then president of Tuscany, was among the founding members, before returning into the PD one year later. In December 2017, Art.1 was a founding member of Free and Equal (LeU), a left-wing joint list for the 2018 Italian general election.

Most of the party's members were formerly affiliated to the Democrats of the Left (DS). The name refers to article 1 of the Italian Constitution that defines Italy as "a democratic republic based on labour" (una Repubblica democratica, fondata sul lavoro) and affirms popular sovereignty. The party was an observer member of the Party of European Socialists.

== History ==
=== Background ===
Following the 2013 leadership election of the Democratic Party (PD), in which Matteo Renzi, a centrist, was elected secretary, an internal struggle arose within the party between Renzi's large majority (composed of Renziani, assorted centrists, and moderate social democrats) and the left-wing factions, which were critical of Renzi, the Renzi government (2014–2016) and his proposed constitutional reform, which would eventually be voted down in the 2016 Italian constitutional referendum. After the splits of Possible (Pos) and Future to the Left (FaS), the standard-bearers of the PD's internal left were Enrico Rossi (leader of the Democratic Socialists faction and President of Tuscany) and Roberto Speranza (leader of Reformist Area and former PD leader in the Chamber of Deputies). These were backed by former DS or PD leaders Massimo D'Alema, Pier Luigi Bersani and Guglielmo Epifani. Rossi and Speranza criticised Renzi on many of his policies and they were joined by Michele Emiliano, President of Apulia. In February 2017 Renzi resigned from secretary, triggering a new leadership election in a couple of months' time. This was not enough for the dissidents, who wanted a lengthier internal debate and a leadership election after the summer, while supporting Paolo Gentiloni's government and opposing an early general election.

At the same time, at the left of the PD, Left Ecology Freedom (SEL) was in the process of merging into the Italian Left (SI), along with minor parties and associations (notably including FaS). A group of SI dissidents, led by Arturo Scotto (once a member of the DS too) and Massimiliano Smeriglio (who, like most SI members, hailed from the Communist Refoundation Party, PRC), were interested in joining the Progressive Camp (CP), a would-be and never established political party launched by Giuliano Pisapia, but they finally decided to join with the PD splinters.

=== Foundation ===
The new party was launched on 25 February 2017 during a convention in Rome. In that occasion, those who left the PD included Vasco Errani, former president of Emilia-Romagna, and deputy minister of the Interior Filippo Bubbico, while Emiliano decided to challenge Renzi in the party's "primaries" instead. Subsequently, 24 deputies and 14 senators left the PD and formed autonomous parliamentary groups both in the Chamber and the Senate. They were joined by 17 deputies and one senator from SI, two deputies from the Mixed Group, one from Civics and Innovators, and one senator from the For the Autonomies group; among these, one deputy and two senators were former members of the Five Star Movement. The groups elected Francesco Laforgia and Maria Cecilia Guerra as leaders, respectively. Deputies and senators were followed by three members of the European Parliament: Antonio Panzeri, Massimo Paolucci and Flavio Zanonato. In October MDP's only member of the government (Bubbico) resigned, and the party stopped supporting the Gentiloni Cabinet.

=== Free and Equal ===
On 3 December 2017 the MDP was a founding member, along with SI and POS, of Free and Equal (LeU), the left-wing joint list for the 2018 general election, which chose the president of the Senate and former anti-Mafia prosecutor Pietro Grasso as its leader and candidate for prime minister. In the election, LeU won 3.4% of the vote, obtaining 14 deputies and four senators. Among these, the MDP had seven deputies (Speranza, Bersani, Epifani, Federico Conte, Federico Fornaro, Michela Rostan and Nico Stumpo) and two senators (Errani and Laforgia). Fornaro was elected president of LeU's parliamentary group in the Chamber. In November 2018, the MDP, which was focused on forming a brand-new "red-green" party, de facto abandoned LeU. In April 2019, the MDP became a full-fledged party, welcoming new members, notably including David Tozzo from Possible, and being renamed simply as Article One (Art.1). Additionally, after Nicola Zingaretti's victory in the 2019 Democratic leadership election, a rapprochement started between the two parties. In the run-up to the 2019 European Parliament election, Art.1 and some other minor groups formed a joint list with the PD.

=== Government participation ===
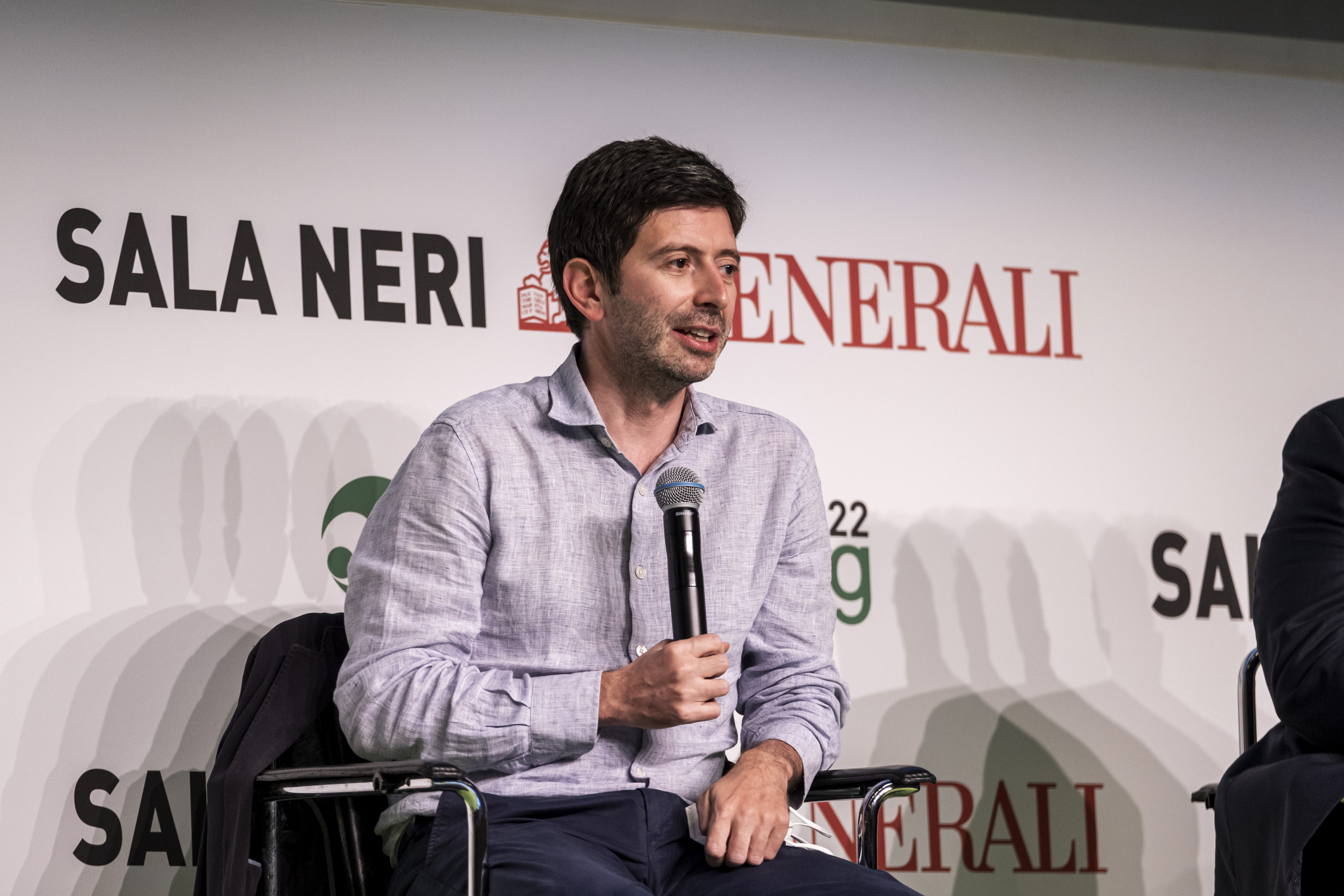
Roberto Speranza in Rimini, 2022

In August 2019, tensions grew within the coalition supporting the Giuseppe Conte's first government, leading to the issuing of a motion of no-confidence by the League. During the 2019 Italian government crisis, the national board of the PD officially opened to the possibility of forming a new cabinet in a coalition with the M5S, based on pro-Europeanism, green economy, sustainable development, fight against economic inequality and a new immigration policy. The party also accepted that Conte might continue at the head of a new government. On 29 August, President Mattarella formally invested Conte to do so. The LeU groups had previously already announced their possible support to the second Conte government, which was finally unveiled in September with the appointment of Speranza as Minister of Health. Following the collapse of Conte's second government on 18 January 2021, and the resulting 2021 Italian government crisis, LeU joined the national unity government of Mario Draghi. In the Draghi government from 2021 to 2022, Speranza continued to serve in his post as Minister of Health.

=== Return to the Democratic Party ===
On 31 December 2021, during an online event reserved to Art.1 party executives, Massimo D'Alema explained that the party would start discussions aimed to the dissolution of Art.1 back into the Democratic Party. In the 2022 Italian general election, the party ran within the PD-led joint list, Democratic Party – Democratic and Progressive Italy, and had five deputies elected. In October 2022, the party became an observer member of the Party of European Socialists. In June 2023, the party merged into the PD.

== Election results ==
=== Italian Parliament ===
Election	Leader	Chamber of Deputies					Senate of the Republic					Government
Election	Leader	Votes	%	Seats	+/–	Position	Votes	%	Seats	+/–	Position	Government
2018	Roberto Speranza	Into LeU		8 / 630	New	6th	Into LeU		2 / 315	New	6th	Opposition (2018–2019)
2018	Roberto Speranza	Into LeU		8 / 630	New	6th	Into LeU		2 / 315	New	6th	Coalition (2019–2021)
2018	Roberto Speranza	Into LeU		8 / 630	New	6th	Into LeU		2 / 315	New	6th	National unity government (2021–2022)
2022	Roberto Speranza	Into PD–IDP		5 / 400	▼3	▲2nd	Into PD–IDP		0 / 200	▼2	▲2nd	Opposition (2022–2023)

=== European Parliament ===
Election	Leader	Votes	%	Seats	+/–	EP Group
2019	Roberto Speranza	Into PD		0 / 76	New	–

=== Regional Councils ===
Region	Election year	Votes	%	Seats	+/−
Emilia-Romagna	2020	into ERC	–	2 / 50	–
Umbria	2019	6,727 (9th) (Note: As Green Civic Left with PRC.)	1.6	0 / 21	–
Abruzzo	2019	16,614 (9th) (Note: As Progressives–Free and Equal.)	2.8	0 / 31	–
Basilicata	2019	12,908 (7th)	4.5	0 / 21	–
Sicily	2017	100,583 (9th) (Note: In a joint list with Italian Left.)	5.2	1 / 70	–

== Leadership ==
- Coordinator/Secretary: Roberto Speranza (2017–2023)
  - Coordinator: Arturo Scotto (2019–2023)
- President: Pier Luigi Bersani (2018–2023)
- Leader in the Chamber of Deputies: Francesco Laforgia (2017–2018)
- Leader in the Senate: Maria Cecilia Guerra (2017–2018)

== Symbols ==
Official logo, 2017–2019

Electoral logo, 2017–2019

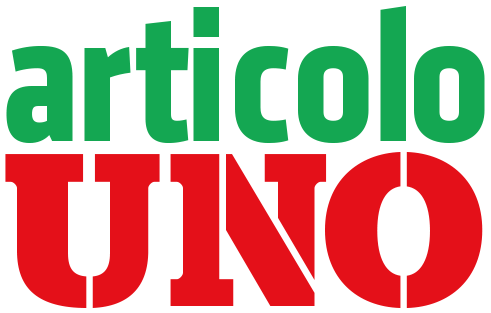
Official logo, 2019–present
