= ÈViva =

èViva
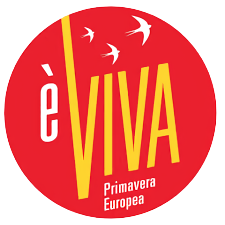
- Spokesperson: Francesco Laforgia
- Founders: Francesco Laforgia; Luca Pastorino
- Founded: 13 April 2019; 7 years ago
- Dissolved: May 2023
- Split from: Article One; Possible
- Merged into: PD
- Headquarters: Via Porta Lecce 134, Brindisi
- Ideology: Democratic socialism Pro-Europeanism; Anti-fascism
- Political position: Left-wing
- National affiliation: The Left (2019)
- European political alliance: DiEM25

Website
- eviva.news

èViva (in English: It is alive) was an Italian left-wing political party.

== History ==
èViva was founded by Francesco Laforgia (member of Article One) and Luca Pastorino (member of Possible) on 13 April 2019. The name of the movement has been chosen via an online-poll.

For the 2019 European Parliament election èViva joins the electoral alliance The Left, with Italian Left, Communist Refoundation and the Party of the South. The Left, that joined the GUE/NGL group, got only the 1.8%, without exceeding the 4%-barrier-threshold, so it didn't get any seat.

For the 2020 regional election èViva joined many lists: in Tuscany "Tuscany to the Left" to support Tommaso Fattori, in Campania "Earth", in Apulia "Solidary and Green Apulia" to support Michele Emiliano, in Liguria "Shared Line" to support Ferruccio Sansa, in Emilia-Romagna "Brave Emilia-Romagna" (Elly Schlein's list) to support Stefano Bonaccini.

Following the victory of Elly Schlein at the 2023 Democratic Party leadership election, both Laforgia and Pastorino joined the Democratic Party.

== Ideology ==
èViva was interested in environmental problems and socio-economic disparities. Its ideologies were democratic socialism, pro-Europeanism and antifascism. It joined European Spring, the platform of DiEM25.

== Election results ==
=== Italian Parliament ===
Election	Leader	Chamber of Deputies				Senate of the Republic			
Election	Leader	Votes	%	Seats	+/–	Votes	%	Seats	+/–
2022	Francesco Laforgia	Into PD–IDP		1 / 400	New	Into PD–IDP		0 / 200	New

=== European Parliament ===
Election	Leader	Votes	%	Seats	+/–	EP Group
2019	Francesco Laforgia	Into LS		0 / 76	New	–

=== Regional Councils ===
Region	Election year	Votes	%	Seats
Emilia-Romagna	2020	Into Brave Emilia-Romagna (Note: With Italian Left and Article One. The list got the 3.77% and 2 seats.)		0 / 50
Apulia	2020	Into Solidary and Green Apulia (Note: With Italian Left, Green Europe and the Italian Socialist Party. The list got the 3.8% and 0 seats.)		0 / 51
Liguria	2020	Into Shared Line (Note: With Italian Left and Possible. The list got the 2.47% and 1 seat.)		0 / 30
Tuscany	2020	Into Tuscany to the Left (Note: With Italian Left, Communist Refoundation Party and Power to the People. The list got the 2.87% and 0 seats.)		0 / 41
Campania	2020	Into Earth (Note: With Italian Left, Communist Refoundation Party, Italian Communist Party and the Party of the South. The list got the 1.07% and 0 seats.)		0 / 51
