= The Left (Italy) =

The Left La Sinistra
- Leaders: Nicola Fratoianni; Maurizio Acerbo
- Founded: March 2019
- Dissolved: June 2019
- Ideology: Democratic socialism Eco-socialism
- Political position: Left-wing
- European affiliation: Party of the European Left (PRC); DiEM25 (èViva)
- European Parliament group: GUE/NGL
- Colours: Red

The Left (Italian: La Sinistra) was a left-wing coalition of political parties in Italy which took part in the 2019 European Parliament election. Its main members were Italian Left and the Communist Refoundation Party.

== History ==
The alliance is the direct heir of The Other Europe (AET), a left-wing coalition representing the anti-austerity movement which took part to the 2014 European election, obtaining 4.0% of the vote and electing three MEPs. After the election, they joined the European United Left–Nordic Green Left (GUE/NGL) Group. The list main member parties, Left Ecology Freedom (SEL) and the Communist Refoundation Party (PRC), elected one MEP each.

In the 2018 general election, the evolution of SEL, Italian Left (SI), led by Nicola Fratoianni, joined Free and Equal (LeU) while the PRC, led by Maurizio Acerbo, ran within Power to the People (PaP). However, SI and PRC broke from their respective alliances in late 2018. Fratoianni accused his LeU former allies of being too close to the Democratic Party (PD) while PRC left the PaP alliance after losing an internal vote over its statutory form.

In February 2019, Acerbo launched the proposal of a joint list composed of SI, the PRC and other minor left-wing parties to participate in the upcoming 2019 European Parliament election. The name and the symbol of were chosen through an online vote in April.

== Composition ==
The coalition was formed by the following parties:

| Party | Main ideology | Leader |
|---|---|---|
| Italian Left (SI) | Democratic socialism | Nicola Fratoianni |
| Communist Refoundation Party (PRC) | Communism | Maurizio Acerbo |
| ÈViva | Eco-socialism | Francesco Laforgia |
| The Other Europe (AET) | Democratic socialism | Massimo Torelli |
| Party of the South (PdS) | Regionalism | Natale Cuccurese |
| Socialist Convergence (CS) | Socialism | Manuel Santoro |

== Electoral results ==
=== European Parliament ===
| Election | Leader | Votes | % | Seats | +/– | EP Group |
|---|---|---|---|---|---|---|
| 2019 | Nicola Fratoianni | 469,943 | 1.75 | 0 / 76 | New | – |
