= Laura Conti =

Italian anti-fascist partisan (1921–1993)

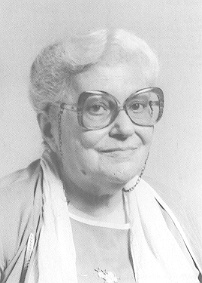
Laura Conti official portrait

Laura Conti (31 March 1921 – 25 May 1993) was an Italian anti-fascist partisan, doctor, environmentalist, socialist politician, feminist, and novelist, considered one of the avant-garde figures of Italian environmentalism.

== Biography ==
Born in Udine, after having lived in Trieste and Verona, she moved to Milan to attend the Faculty of Medicine. In January 1944 she joined the Youth Front for National Independence and Freedom of Eugenio Curiel. On 4 July she was arrested; after a brief period in San Vittore, she was interned in the Bolzano Transit Camp. She luckily succeeded avoiding deportation to Germany. From this experience came the novel La condizione sperimentale.

Once free, she obtained her degree in medicine. In Milan she also cemented her political commitment: first in the ranks of the Italian Socialist Party, and from 1951 in the Italian Communist Party. She held the positions of provincial councilor from 1960 to 1970 and subsequently, until 1980, of regional councilor of Lombardy. She was secretary of the Casa della Cultura, founded and directed the Gramsci Association, and participated in the foundation of the Lega per l'ambiente (today Legambiente) in which she was president of the Scientific Committee. In 1987 she was elected to the Chamber of Deputies.

== Environmentalism ==
The environmentalism of Laura Conti had a component of strong humanity that was rooted in her experience in the Resistance. These roots were shared with another figure of the enlightened Milan, Ercole Ferrario. Conti liked to repeat: "I am not a scientist, but a scholar of ecological problems. While finding the study fascinating, I think it is also important to act and operate. For this reason I decided to do politics: it is not enough to study, we must also get busy."

On 10 July 1976 the Seveso disaster occurred. From Icmesa, a factory north of Milan, a toxic cloud came out containing many kilos of dioxin, a substance then almost unknown, which fell on the town. Conti was then a regional councilor and did not spare her help and comfort to the inhabitants of Seveso.

With the publications Visto da Seveso and Una lepre con la faccia di bambina [A hare with the face of a child], her popularity transcended national borders. On June 24, 1982, Brussels approved the directive on the risks of accidents associated with certain industrial activities that will be called the "Seveso Directive."

In 1986 she was awarded the Minerva Award for her scientific and cultural contributions.

== Selected writings ==
- Cecilia e le streghe - Einaudi, Torino, 1963
- La condizione sperimentale - Mondadori, Milano, 1965
- Sesso ed educazione - Editori Riuniti, Roma, 1971
- Le frontiere della vita - Arnoldo Mondadori Editore, Milano, 1972
- Il dominio sulla materia - Arnoldo Mondadori Editore, Milano, 1973
- Che cos'è l'ecologia. Capitale, lavoro e ambiente. - Ed. Mazzotta, Milano, 1977
- Visto da Seveso - Feltrinelli, Milano, 1977
- Una lepre con la faccia di bambina - Editori Riuniti, Roma, 1978
- Il tormento e lo scudo - Mazzotta, Milano, 1981
- Imparare la salute - Zanichelli, Milano, 1983
- Questo pianeta - Editori Riuniti, Roma, 1983
- Terra a rendere - Ediesse, Roma, 1986
- Ambiente terra - Mondadori, Milano, 1988
- Discorso sulla caccia - Editori Riuniti, Roma, 1992
