= Pierluigi Vigna =

Italian magistrate

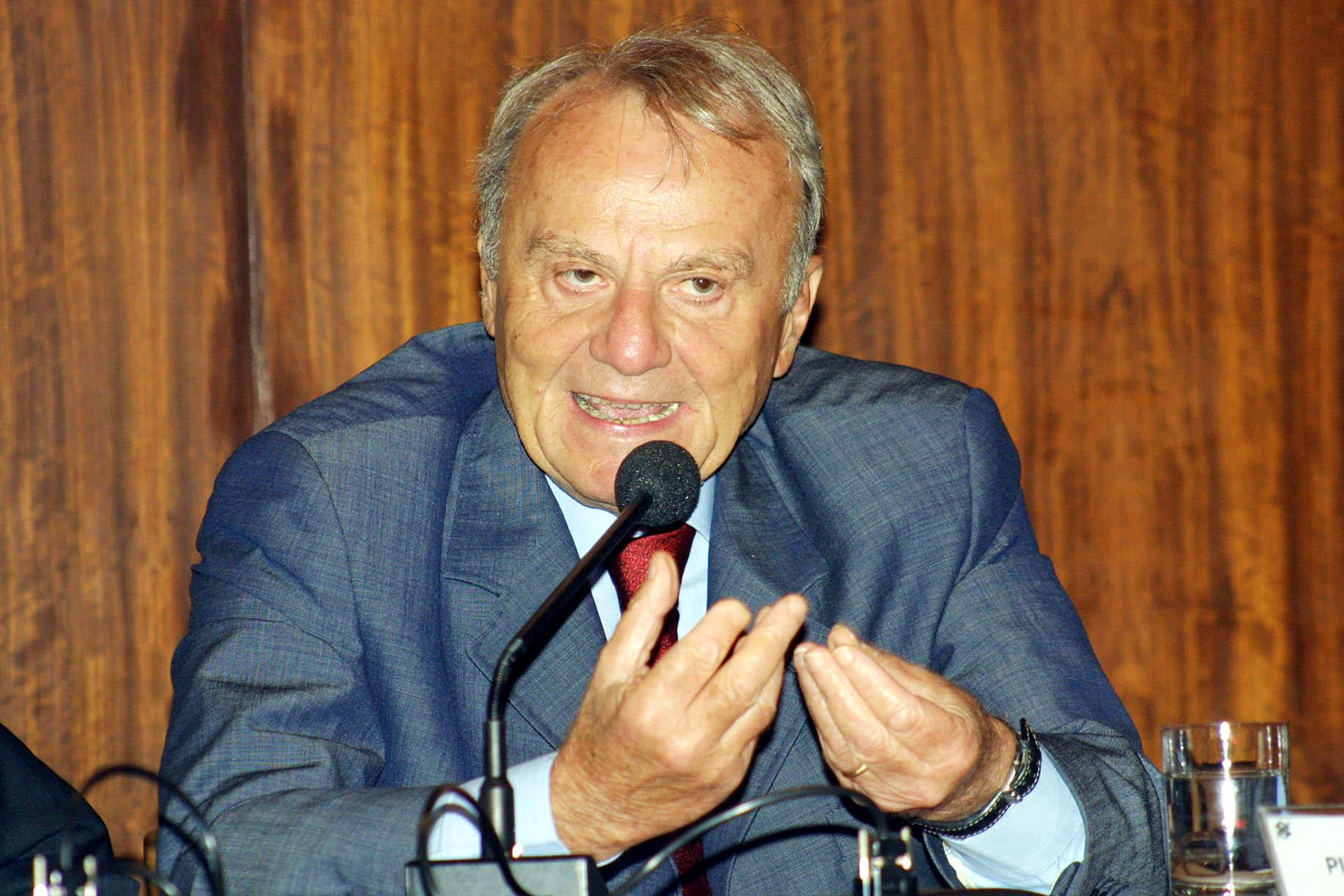
Piero Luigi Vigna

Piero Luigi Vigna (1 August 1933 - 28 September 2012) was an Italian magistrate. From 1997 to 2005 he was Chief of the Procura Nazionale Antimafia (National Antimafia Prosecution Office).

== Biography ==
He was born at Borgo San Lorenzo and became a magistrate in 1959. He was initially pretore in Florence and Milan, returning to his native city's prosecution office in 1965. In 1991 he became Chief Prosecutor: his investigations included those on right-wing terrorism, the Train 904 bombing and the so-called Monster of Florence, as well as on the presence of mafia in Tuscany. From 1992, he also acted as district antimafia prosecutor.

On 14 January 1997, Vigna was appointed National Antimafia Prosecutor, a position he held until reaching retirement age in 2005. He was succeeded by Piero Grasso. Until his death he remained honorary president of Magistratura indipendente, an Italian magistrates' association.
