= Italian Left =

Italian political party

Italian Left Sinistra Italiana
- Abbreviation: SI
- Secretary: Nicola Fratoianni
- President: Nichi Vendola
- Founded: 19 February 2017; 9 years ago
- Merger of: Left Ecology Freedom and minor groups
- Headquarters: via Arenula 29, Rome
- Youth wing: Union of Young People of the Left
- Membership (2017): 19,346
- Ideology: Democratic socialism Eco-socialism
- Political position: Left-wing
- National affiliation: LeU (2018–2019); The Left (2019); AVS (since 2022)
- European affiliation: PEL (observer, until 2025); NtP (since 2024); ELA (since 2025)
- European Parliament group: The Left (since 2024) (Note: Between 2017 and 2019, SI had one MEP each in GUE/NGL and S&D.)
- Colours: Red
- Chamber of Deputies: 4 / 400
- Senate: 2 / 205
- European Parliament: 2 / 76 (Note: Mimmo Lucano sits as independent.)
- Regional Councils: 10 / 896

Website
- sinistraitaliana.si

Italian Left (Italian: Sinistra Italiana, SI) is a left-wing political party in Italy. SI was launched in November 2015 as a parliamentary group in the Chamber of Deputies (full name: Italian Left – Left Ecology Freedom), including Left Ecology Freedom (SEL), dissidents from the Democratic Party like Future to the Left, and splinters from the Five Star Movement. At its launch, SI included 32 deputies, who were soon followed by eight senators (who formed a sub-group within the Mixed Group of the Senate in February 2016), and two MEPs. SI was officially formed as a full-fledged party in February 2017, after SEL had chosen to merge into it in December 2016.

The party is led by Nicola Fratoianni. Notable founding members included Nichi Vendola (former leader of SEL), Loredana De Petris, Stefano Fassina, and Sergio Cofferati. In the aftermath of its founding congress, 18 deputies left the party, leaving it with 13 deputies, eight senators and 2 MEPs: 17 deputies, led by former group leader Arturo Scotto, joined the brand-new Article One, while Laura Boldrini (President of the Chamber of Deputies) joined the Chamber's Mixed Group. In late 2017, the party was a founding member of Free and Equal, a left-wing joint list for the 2018 general election, and more recently in 2022 founded the Greens and Left Alliance (AVS) with Green Europe.

== History ==
=== Background ===
In June 2015, Stefano Fassina, a former deputy minister in the Letta Cabinet, left the Democratic Party (PD) over disagreements with Matteo Renzi, then PD leader and Prime Minister. In doing this he was followed by his long-time ally Monica Gregori. In July, during a convention, Fassina launched Future to the Left (FaS), an incubator of a new left-leaning party, with other movements and breakaway groups such as Possible (Pos) and Left Ecology Freedom (SEL).

In November, one senator (Corradino Mineo) and three more deputies (Alfredo D'Attorre, Carlo Galli and Vincenzo Folino) left the party in protest against Renzi. D'Attorre, who holds a doctorate in philosophy from the Sant'Anna School of Advanced Studies, wrote a manifesto for a new "labour" party, which was signed also by the other five MPs and, which read: "The genetic mutation of the PD, born as central force of the Italian centre-left, is unfortunately already completed. The Renzi experience and the introduced mutations won't be a parenthesis. They have already altered in an irreversible way the perception of the PD and its function in the collective imagination". Subsequently, a parliamentary group under the banner of Italian Left was formed in the Chamber of Deputies, whose core was formed by SEL.

=== Formation of the party ===
In February 2016, SI held its constituent assembly in Rome. Consequently, SI was established as a sub-group within the Mixed Group in the Senate: five senators of SEL, two dissidents from the Five Star Movement (Fabrizio Bocchino and Francesco Campanella) and one former Democrat (Mineo) joined, while two SEL senators (including Sardinian nationalist Luciano Uras) refused to join and left their party altogether.

Several lists named after SI participated in the 2016 local elections. The party did particularly well in Sesto Fiorentino, a medium-sized city in the metropolitan area of Florence, where it won 17.5% of the vote and its candidate for mayor was elected in the run-off with 65.5%, by beating his Democratic opponent.

In December 2016, SEL was dissolved, to merge it into SI in early 2017.

In February 2017, SI was officially formed and Nicola Fratoianni was elected as its first secretary.

Contextually, SI leader in the Chamber of Deputies Arturo Scotto (who was originally a candidate for the leadership Massimiliano Smeriglio), D'Attorre, Galli and Folino led a splinter group into the Article One – Democratic and Progressive Movement (MDP), a party formed by left-wing splinters of the PD.

In March 2017, SI welcomed the four deputies of Possible (Pos) in its group in the Chamber. In April, Campanella left the party.

On 24 June 2017, SI was accepted into the Party of the European Left as an observer member.

=== Free and Equal coalition ===
On 3 December 2017, SI established Free and Equal (LeU), a left-wing joint list for the 2018 general election, together with the MDP and Possible, and chose the president of the Senate and former anti-Mafia prosecutor Pietro Grasso as its leader and candidate for Prime Minister.

In the election, SI obtained three deputies (Fratoianni, Fassina and Erasmo Palazzotto) and one senator (De Petris).

In October, SI focused on forming an alliance with Luigi de Magistris' Popular Coalition for the 2019 European Parliament election, and broke with the MDP and LeU.

In January 2019, after the MDP's departure, SI returned into LeU's fold and, under the leadership of senator Francesco Laforgia and deputy Luca Pastorino (dissenting members of the MDP and Possible, respectively), the two organisations initiated a collaboration with the goal of forming a joint party at some point.

For the 2019 European Parliament election, SI formed a joint list named The Left with the Communist Refoundation Party and other left-wing and far-left groups. The list obtained a mere 1.8% of the vote, leading Fratoianni to resign from secretary of SI.

=== In and out of government ===
In August 2019, tensions grew within the coalition supporting the government, leading to the issuing of a motion of no-confidence by the League. During the following government crisis, the M5S and the PD agreed to form a new cabinet together, under outgoing Prime Minister Giuseppe Conte. SI, along with the MDP and the entire LeU, joined Conte's second government, in which SI's Giuseppe De Cristofaro was appointed undersecretary of University.

In January 2021, Fratoianni was re-elected secretary of the party during an online congress.

In February, after the collapse of the government led by Conte, Mario Draghi was sworn in at the head of a government comprising the main parties of the centre-left and the centre-right. Fratoianni voiced concerns over SI's participation in the government and the party's national assembly voted against the cabinet. However, two out of three MPs, senator De Petris and deputy Palazzotto, announced their intention to vote in favour anyway, splitting the party. Subsequently, Palazzotto left the party.

=== 2022 general election ===
In January 2022, SI and Green Europe (EV) formed a "consultation pact", aimed at co-operating on the 2022 Italian presidential election held in late January. In that context, the two parties decided to jointly support Luigi Manconi, a former lawmaker for the Federation of the Greens, the Democrats of the Left, and the Democratic Party (PD) and expert on human rights issues. In June 2022, SI's national assembly formally approved the alliance with EV.

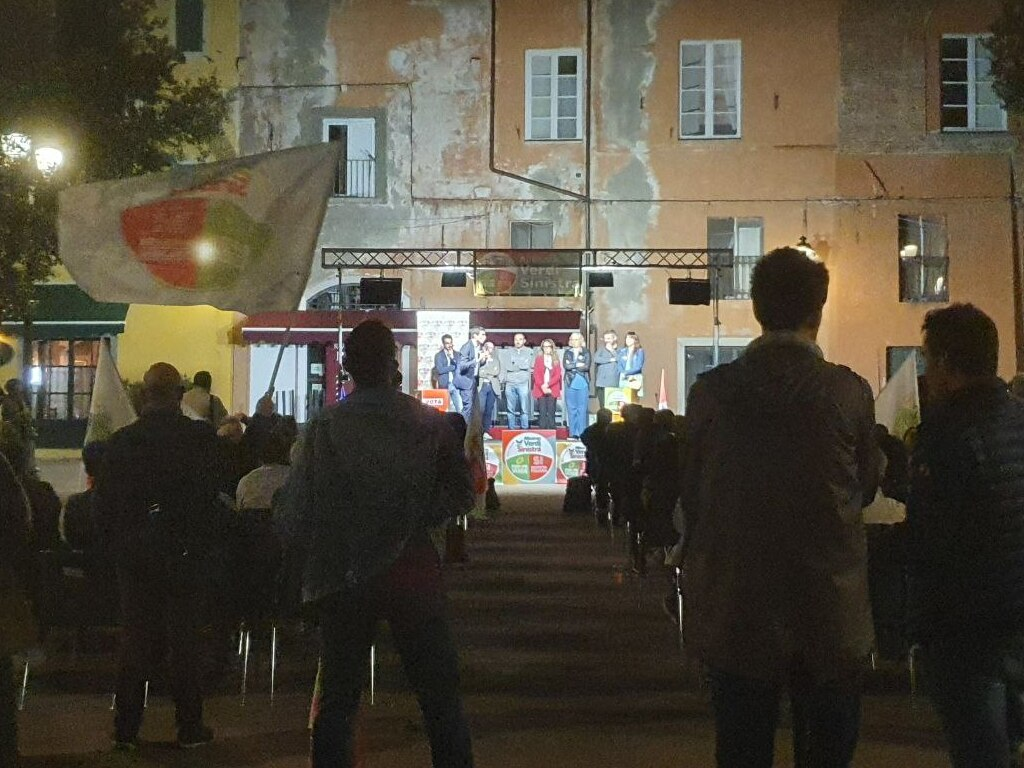
Nicola Fratoianni at the final election rally in Pisa before the 2022 legislative election. Ilaria Cucchi is also on stage.

In July 2022, SI and EV held a joint convention in Rome named "New Energies", promoting their cooperation and a unitary electoral program. The alliance deliberately took inspiration from the New Ecologic and Social People's Union, the left-wing list formed in the run-up of the 2022 French legislative election. Following the fall of Draghi's government, the early dissolution of the Italian Parliament and the calling of the 2022 general election, the AVS was officially launched and its logo presented. On 6 August 2022, the alliance formalised an electoral agreement with the PD. AVS elected 12 deputies and four senators, including four deputies and two senators from SI.

The November 2023 congress, in which Fratoianni was re-elected secretary, marked the return to active politics by Nichi Vendola, former SEL leader, who was elected president.

The alliance with EV is renewed for the 2024 European Parliament, where AVS with a 6.78% elected six MEPs, including two candidates from SI, Ilaria Salis and Mimmo Lucano, both of them decide to join The Left group in the EU parliament. On 6 June 2026, Ilaria Salis joined the party.

In December 2025 the party joined the European Left Alliance for the People and the Planet, a left-wing European political party created from a network (Now the People) in which Sinistra Italiana had participated.

== Composition ==
The party's founding members were:

Party	Main ideology	Leader	Ref
Left Ecology Freedom (SEL)	Democratic socialism	Nichi Vendola	
Future to the Left (FaS)	Social democracy	Stefano Fassina	
Venetian Left (SV)	Communism	Pietrangelo Pettenò	

Along these, some youth organisations (including ACT! Agire Costruire Trasformare and TILT), local groups and individuals have joined SI.

== Ideology ==
SI's ideology is a mix of democratic socialism, social democracy, and anti-austerity stances. In his manifesto, D'Attorre wrote that the new party would need to "go beyond the separation between reformists and radicals" and later explained that SI would be Keynesian and opposed to neoliberalism. The coalition's economics adviser is Joseph Stiglitz, a well-known American economist and winner of the Nobel Prize in economics, who had already been involved with Syriza in Greece, Podemos in Spain, and the Labour Party under Jeremy Corbyn in the United Kingdom. Fassina has also proposed a "controlled disintegration of the Eurozone".

According to its statute, "Sinistra Italiana is an association that is formed to represent work [...] and it is inextricably linked to the movement for peace and anti-fascism. It fights for a society founded on social equality, on respect for the environment. Its objectives are the full implementation of the Constitution and a democratic and social State of law, in the belief that the freedom of all is the condition and not the limit of everyone's freedom".

=== Work and social policies ===
The party strongly supports the reduction of working hours for equal pay, the introduction of a minimum wage (of at least 10 euros per hour) to combat "poverty, social despair and precariousness" (such as the citizenship income to which it's in favour), and the introduction of a representation law to combat exploitation and promote good employment, with the aim of rebuilding a relationship and political representation of labour.

It supports a greater investment in public health and public education (from preschool to university), and condemns their strong privatization.

It proposes the establishment of a free basic psychologist for all, psychological support services in schools, awareness campaigns and structural investments for the protection of mental health, so that psychological well-being will be "a guaranteed and accessible right for all".

It also proposes a salary increase for teachers, policies to combat precariousness, free public nursery schools, a reduction in the number of students per class, free textbooks for schoolchildren, free public university (with the gradual abolition of student fees and a remodulation of the regional tax on the right to study), the ban of unpaid internships, policies to combat the emigration of young people abroad and a greater investment in research.

To reduce deaths in the workplace, it proposes more inspections and controls, constant training for safety at work, contracts that guarantee stability, and fewer working hours.

To counter gender stereotypes, gender-based violence and homotransphobia, it proposes specific information campaigns, the introduction in schools of courses on sex and sentimental education and education to respect and differences; funding for a "freedom income", investments in anti-violence associations and centres, in order to "build a society free from patriarchy and imposed religious legacies".

It also supports compulsory and equal parental leave for both parents in order to ensure greater gender equality in work.

=== Economy and taxation ===
The party proposes the introduction of a wealth tax on large assets ("tax on the rich") to redistribute wealth so that "those who have a lot pay a lot and those who have little pay less". This is done through the elimination of the IMU and stamp duty, replacing them with a single and progressive tax on large net assets per natural person, in order to obtain tens of billions of euros to be used for health, education, free nurseries, pensions and public transport.

It also supports the introduction of an anti-relocation law, the fight against tax havens, the lowering of the threshold limit for the use of cash and the gradual replacement of the use of cash with electronic payment methods (eliminating bank commissions) in order to fight tax evasion (recovering hundreds of billions of euros) and mafias.

=== Civil rights ===
The party is strongly in favour of the legalisation of euthanasia, the legalisation of cannabis (mainly to combat crime), LGBT rights, the introduction of jus soli, medical abortion in day hospital, gestation for others (solidarity, altruistic and regulated) and the introduction of identification codes on the uniforms of law enforcement officers to prevent them from engaging in illicit behaviour (such as abuse of power) on the civilians.

On LGBT rights, the party proposes: the legalization of equal marriage and adoption for gay couples (and for singles), the prohibition of reparative therapies and the prohibition of medically unnecessary surgery on intersex children, a law against homotransphobia (and against ableism).

=== Immigration ===
The party, in addition to being in favor of granting citizenship to minor children of legal foreigners born and raised in Italy (ius soli), supports the timely rescue of migrants in the sea, their reception and integration, their regularisation for the recognition of the "invisible" and the establishment of humanitarian corridors.

=== Defence and foreign policy ===
The party advocates pacifism, Europeanism, low national spending on military defense, a common European army, diplomacy as a tool for resolving disputes between nations, and ideally global disarmament.

=== Democracy ===
The party proposes a ban on private funding of political parties and associations in order to prevent them from becoming "politically weak, susceptible to blackmail and permeable to the demands of the rich financier of the moment". It's also against foreign states financing of politicians. It proposes a proportional electoral law and the right for 'out-of-office' citizens to vote in their homes.

== Election results ==
=== Italian Parliament ===
Election	Leader	Chamber of Deputies					Senate of the Republic					Government
Election	Leader	Votes	%	Seats	+/–	Position	Votes	%	Seats	+/–	Position	Government
2018	Nicola Fratoianni	Into LeU	3.39	3 / 630	–	6th	Into LeU	3.28	1 / 315	–	6th	Opposition (2018–2019)
2018	Nicola Fratoianni	Into LeU	3.39	3 / 630	–	6th	Into LeU	3.28	1 / 315	–	6th	Coalition (2019–2021)
2018	Nicola Fratoianni	Into LeU	3.39	3 / 630	–	6th	Into LeU	3.28	1 / 315	–	6th	Opposition (2021–2022)
2022	Nicola Fratoianni	Into AVS	3.63	4 / 400	▲1	▼7th	Into AVS	3.53	3 / 200	▲2	▼7th	Opposition (2022–present)

=== European Parliament ===
Election	Leader	Votes	%	Seats	+/–	EP Group
2019	Nicola Fratoianni	Into The Left	1.75	0 / 76	New	–
2024	Nicola Fratoianni	Into AVS	6.78	2 / 76	▲2	The Left

=== Regional Councils ===
Region	Election year	Votes	%	Seats	+/−	Status in legislature
Aosta Valley	2025	3,816 (7th) (into AVS)	6.32	0 / 35	–	No seats
Piedmont	2024	107,095 (6th) (into AVS)	6.48	2 / 51	▲1	Opposition
Lombardy	2023	93,019 (10th)(into AVS)	3.2	1 / 80	▲1	Opposition
Trentino-Alto Adige	2023	7,565 (9th) (into AVS)	3.25	0 / 35	–	No seats
Veneto	2025	77,621 (6th) (into AVS)	4.64	0 / 51	–	No seats
Friuli-Venezia Giulia	2023	8,029 (8th)(into AVS)	2.03	1 / 48	–	Opposition
Emilia-Romagna	2024	79,236 (4th)(into AVS)	5.30	2 / 51	▲2	Majority
Liguria	2024	34,716 (6th) (into AVS)	6.17	0 / 31	▼1	No seats
Tuscany	2025	89,057 (4th) (into AVS)	7.01	2 / 41	▲2	Majority
Marche	2025	23,565 (8th) (into AVS)	4.15	0 / 31	–	No seats
Umbria	2024	13,750 (8th) (into AVS)	4.28	1 / 21	▲1	Majority
Lazio	2023	7.974 (11th)	1.21	1 / 51	–	Opposition
Abruzzo	2024	20,655 (9th) (into AVS)	3.57	0 / 31	–	No seats
Molise	2023	6,742 (10th) (into AVS)	4.77	0 / 21	–	No seats
Campania	2025	93,596 (11th) (into AVS)	4.66	1 / 51	▲1	Majority
Apulia	2025	54,358 (8th) (into AVS)	4.09	0 / 51	–	No seats
Basilicata	2024	15,144 (9th) (into AVS)	5.79	0 / 21	–	No seats
Calabria	2025	29,251 (11th) (into AVS)	3.85	0 / 31	–	No seats
Sicily	2022	55,599 (9th) (Note: In a joint list with Article One–MDP.)	3.0	0 / 70	▼1	No seats
Sardinia	2024	32,145 (6th) (into AVS)	4.7	1 / 60	▲1	Majority

== Leadership ==
- Secretary: Nicola Fratoianni (2017–2019), Claudio Grassi (acting, 2019–2021), Nicola Fratoianni (2021–present)
  - Deputy Secretary: Giovanni Paglia (2021–2023)
  - Spokesperson: Nicola Fratoianni (2020–2021)
  - Coordinator: Elisabetta Piccolotti (2021–2023), Giovanni Paglia (2023–present)
- President: Laura Lauri (2017–2019), Claudio Grassi (2019–2022), Maria Gabriella Branca (2022–2023), Nichi Vendola (2023–present)
- President of National Assembly: Maria Gabriella Branca (2023–present)
- Party Leader in the Chamber of Deputies: Arturo Scotto (2015–2017), Giulio Marcon (2017–2018), Nicola Fratoianni (2018–present)
- Party Leader in the Senate: Loredana De Petris (2016–2022), Peppe De Cristofaro (2022–present)

== Symbols ==
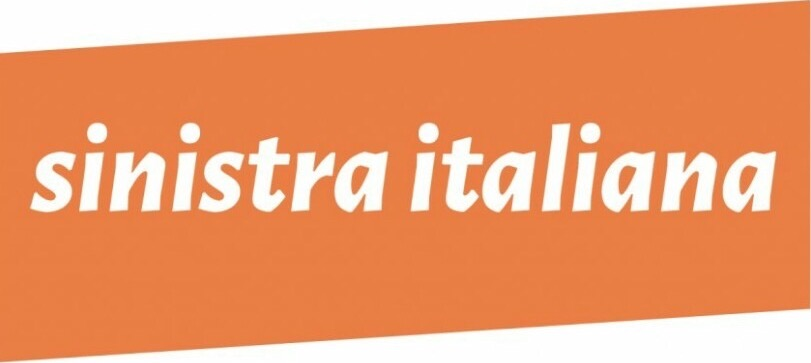
2015–2016

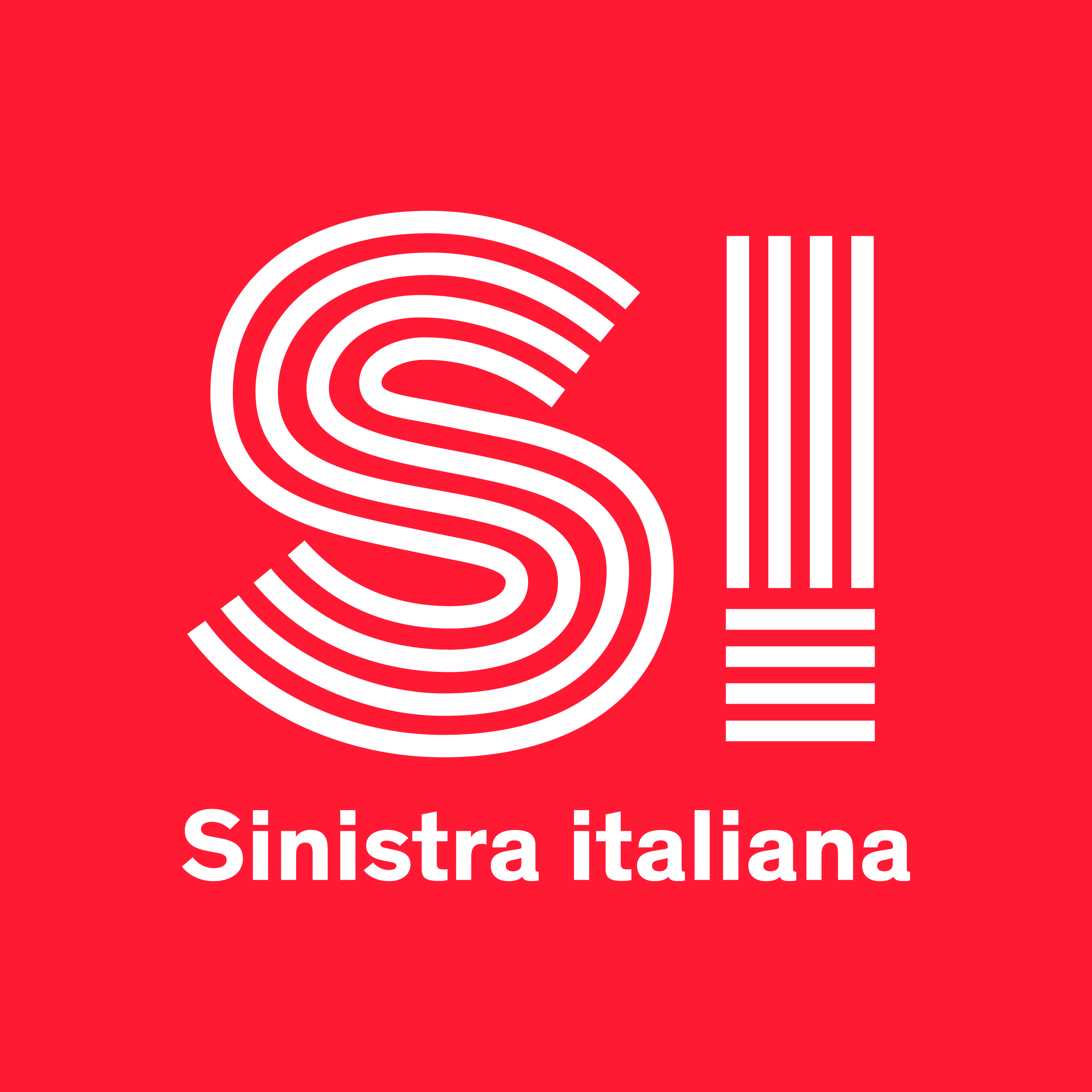
2016–2017

2017–present
