= Arturo Scotto =

Italian politician (born 1978)

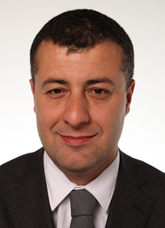

Member of the Chamber of Deputies
- Incumbent
- Assumed office 13 October 2022
- In office 15 March 2013 – 23 March 2018
- In office 28 April 2006 – 28 April 2008

Coordinator of Article One
- In office 7 April 2019 – 10 June 2023
- Preceded by: Roberto Speranza
- Succeeded by: Party dissolved

Personal details
- Born: 15 May 1978 (age 48) Torre del Greco, Italy
- Party: PD (since 2023)
- Other political affiliations: PDS (1994–1998); DS (1998–2007); SD (2007–2010); SEL (2010–2016); Art1 (2017–2023)
- Education: University of Naples Federico II
- Occupation: Politician

Arturo Scotto (born 15 May 1978) is an Italian politician.

== Biography ==
Graduated in Political Sciences, Scotto became a member of the Left Youth in 1994 and in 1996 he was elected Secretary of the Circle of Torre del Greco. In 2001 he entered the national leadership of the Democrats of the Left.

With the 2006 Italian general election, Scotto is elected at the Chamber of Deputies with the Democrats of the Left, being the youngest Deputy of the legislature. In 2007, he opposed the dissolution of the Democrats of the Left and the birth of the Democratic Party, joining the Democratic Left.

At the 2008 Italian general election, Scotto was again a candidate for the Chamber of Deputies with The Left-The Rainbow, but failed the election. In 2010, he entered the national leadership of Nichi Vendola's Left Ecology Freedom and became the party's manager for foreign affairs. At the 2013 Italian general election, Scotto returned to the Chamber of Deputies and in 2014 was elected as group leader of Left Ecology Freedom.

On 23 January 2017 he was a candidate for the Secretariat of the Italian Left party, representing the most dialoguing wing with the Democratic Party, but later withdrawed the candidacy. On February, with the dissolution of Left Ecology Freedom, Scotto joined the Democratic and Progressive Movement.

At the 2018 Italian general election, Scotto tries once again to be elected for the Chamber of Deputies with Free and Equal, but did not manage to be elected in the Italian Parliament.

In 2022, he was re-elected as a member of parliament representing the Democratic and Progressive Movement.

On 1 October 2025, he was detained by Israel alongside three other Italian lawmakers while participating in the Global Sumud Flotilla which aimed to carry aid to the Gaza Strip; the group subsequently filed a criminal complaint with the Public Prosecutor's Office in Rome.
