= Legambiente =

Italian environmentalist association

Legambiente is an Italian environmentalist association. It was formed in 1980 as part of the non-profit ARCI (Italian Recreational and Cultural Association), later becoming independent. The association was originally called Lega per l'ambiente (League for the Environment); to distinguish itself from numerous other environmental associations, it adopted its present name in 1992.

The association advocates for a balanced relationship between civilization and the natural environment, including improved environmental quality, reduction of all kinds of pollution, and wise use of natural resources. According to the organization's website, Legambiente had 20 regional blanches, 1000 local groups and more than 115,000 members in 2018, making it the largest environmental organization in Italy.

== Activity ==
Legambiente's activity is based on scientific environmentalism, with every campaign or proposal for the protection of the environment developed from a rigorous review of scientific data. The association publishes the monthly news magazine La Nuova Ecologia (New Ecology) and annual Ambiente Italia reports on the environment in Italy.

Legambiente has organised many environmental monitoring and awareness-raising campaigns and volunteering activities on air quality, sea pollution and marine litter. The association promotes the use of renewable energy, energy efficiency, a green and circular economy, preservation of natural protected areas, and the fight against illegal waste management.

=== Anti-nuclear activism ===
The organization's position on nuclear energy was the subject of many fierce debates in its early years. Many of the founders and early members of the organization had come from the Italian Communist Party (PCI), which traditionally held a pro-nuclear pro-industry stance, while other members belonged to the anti-nuclear movement. The anti-nuclear position gained ground and became cemented in the organization following the 1986 Chernobyl disaster. Within a month of the disaster, the organization published evidence of increased radiation levels in the country due to the radioactive release. Legambiente was a promoter of the 1987 and 2011 referendums against nuclear power in Italy.

=== Ecomafia ===
Legambiente coined the term ecomafia to refer to the work of organized crime in waste trafficking and disposal, illegal construction and excavation. From 1999, the organization has published an annual Ecomafia report. It has worked against these illegal activities in cooperation with the Carabinieri and other law enforcement agencies.

=== Air pollution ===
Every year, during January and February, Legambiente holds initiatives to promote public transport at the expense of private transport, the main cause of poor air quality in cities. One of the most characteristic aspects of the initiative is the exposure of white smog-catching sheets exposed to the open air, especially in urban centers, industrial areas, and near schools. The gradual blackening of the sheets over a month is a clear and evident indicator of air pollution.

=== Festambiente ===
Festambiente is the organization's annual festival, held in August near Maremma Regional Park since 1989. The festival attracts 80,000 visitors and provides information on healthy living, conservation and culture, and includes lectures, debates, and performances.

== Notable people ==
Among Legambiente's most famous activists are:

- Giovanni Berlinguer, co-founder, medical doctor and politician, served for two decades in the Italian Chamber of Deputies and the Senate for the Communist Party (his brother Enrico was party leader), and five years in the European Parliament, advancing proposals on climate change and health.
- Laura Conti (1921–1993), president of the scientific committee, medical doctor, among the first to be interested in the 1976 Seveso chemical disaster. Member of parliament (1987–1992).
- Francesco Ferrante, general manager from 1995 to 2007, elected Senator in 2006 with The Daisy, he was The Olive Tree's group leader in the Senate Environment Committee from 2006 to 2003 and then still a member of the Senate from 2008 to 2013 for the Democratic Party.
- Fabrizio Giovenale (1918–2006), co-founder, an urban planner, writer, ecologist, editor for La Nuova Ecologia.
- Alexander Langer (1946-1995), one of the founders of the Federation of the Greens party, and was the promoter of numerous initiatives for peace, coexistence, human rights, and defence of the environment.
- Rossella Muroni, president (2007–2015), national president (2015–2017); deputy for Free and Equal in 2018.
- Ermete Realacci, president (1987–2003), member of parliament (2001–2008), president of the Environment Committee of the Chamber (2006–2008).
- Maurizio Sacconi, former Senator of The People of Freedom and New Centre-Right, former minister and undersecretary in the Berlusconi IV Cabinet and former socialist Deputy, he was president of the association between 1981 and 1984.
- Massimo Serafini, one of the founders of the newspaper Il manifesto. Member of the PCI from 1983 to 1992, he was among the presenters of the main legislative proposals on environmental issues. Among the promoters of the 1987 anti-nuclear referendum, he is a member of the National Assembly of Legambiente's elected representatives.
- Roberto Della Seta, was national president from 2003 to 2007. Parliamentarian for the Democratic Party from 2008 to 2013.
- Chicco Testa, first secretary and then president of the Association in the early 1980s. Later, he became a member of the PCI and of the PDS, and served as president of Acea and Enel. After having supported the battle against nuclear energy in the 1980s, on the occasion of the 2011 referendum he instead openly supported the return to nuclear power, becoming president of the Italian Nuclear Forum.

== See also ==
- Nuclear power debate
- Italian referendums, 1987
- Nuclear power in Italy
- Anti-nuclear movement
