= Rossella Muroni =

Italian environmentalist and politician (born 1974)

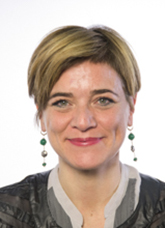

Member of the Chamber of Deputies
- In office 23 March 2018 – 13 October 2022

President of Legambiente
- In office 13 December 2015 – 19 December 2017

Personal details
- Born: 8 October 1974 (age 51) Rome, Italy
- Party: PD (Since 2023)
- Other political affiliations: Green Italia (Until 2023)
- Education: Sapienza University of Rome
- Occupation: Environmentalist, politician

Rossella Muroni (born 8 October 1974) is an Italian environmentalist and politician.

== Early life ==
She graduated in Sociology. From 1994 to 1996 she was part of the Student Union as the national manager of the student's legal office of the Italian General Confederation of Labour.

== Career ==
In 1996 she joined the environmentalist association Legambiente where she initially worked in the press office. From 2002 to 2007, she served as national manager of information campaigns. She became the spokesperson for the Legambiente campaign sector and took care of the main information and awareness activities of the association, giving contributions to association publications including: the Italian Environment Report, the Ecomafia dossier, the Blue Guide, the Urban Ecosystem Report and drafting information leaflets and brochures on environmental issues.

In 2007 she became general director of the association and in 2015 was elected national president of Legambiente. In December 2017, she left her office in order to run for the 2018 political elections with the left-wing coalition Free and Equal and was elected deputy.

Following the victory of Elly Schlein at the 2023 Democratic Party leadership election, she joined the Democratic Party.
