= Democratic Socialists (Italy) =

Social-democratic association in Italy

Democratic Socialists (Italian: Democraticisocialisti) is a social-democratic association in Italy.

It was founded as a left-wing faction within the Democratic Party (PD), a political party in Italy, but left the party in February 2017 with the launch of Article One. Its leader is Enrico Rossi, President of Tuscany, while its president is Peppino Caldarola, a former deputy and associate of Massimo D'Alema.

== Leadership ==
- President: Peppino Caldarola (2016–present)
- Coordinator: Tommaso Giuntella (2016–2017), Silvia Prodi (2017–present)
- Organisational secretary: Mirko Tutino (2016–present)
