= Future to the Left =

Future to the Left Futuro a Sinistra
- Leader: Stefano Fassina
- Founded: 4 July 2015
- Dissolved: 7 November 2015
- Split from: Democratic Party
- Merged into: Italian Left
- Ideology: Social democracy
- Political position: Left-wing

Website
- www.futuroasinistra.it

Future to the Left (Italian: Futuro a Sinistra) was a social-democratic political party in Italy. Its leader was Stefano Fassina.

In June 2015 Fassina, a long-time critic of Matteo Renzi, leader of the Democratic Party (PD) and Prime Minister, left the party, followed by his long-time ally Monica Gregori. In July, during a convention, Fassina launched Future to the Left, which aimed at being an embryonic new party to the left of the PD, open to other Democratic splinters, such as those gathered in Giuseppe Civati's Possible, and Left Ecology Freedom (SEL), a political party led by Nichi Vendola.

In November one senator (Corradino Mineo) and three deputies (Alfredo D'Attorre, Carlo Galli and Vincenzo Folino) left the PD in protest at Renzi, in order to join the new Italian Left together with Fassina and Monica Gregori of Future to the Left. D'Attorre, who holds a doctorate in philosophy from the Sant'Anna School of Advanced Studies, wrote a manifesto for a new "labour" party, which was signed also by the other five MPs and, among other things, read: "The genetic mutation of the PD, born as central force of the Italian centre-left, is unfortunately already completed. The Renzi experience and the introduced mutations won't be a parenthesis. They have already altered in a irreversible way the perception of the PD and its function in the collective imagination." It was also announced that, by the end of the month, joint left-wing parliamentary groups, including SEL, Future to the Left and some splinters of the Five Star Movement, will be formed. Civati, for his part, decided to not take part in the effort.

In February 2016 Future to the Left took part to Italian Left's constituent assembly in Rome, where it was announced that the group will be established as a full-fledged party in December. During the assembly, another splinter from the PD, Giovanna Martelli, joined SI, declaring that she needed to "go back to the roots".

After some months, Future to the Left merged in the new Italian Left party.
