= Corradino Mineo =

Italian journalist and politician

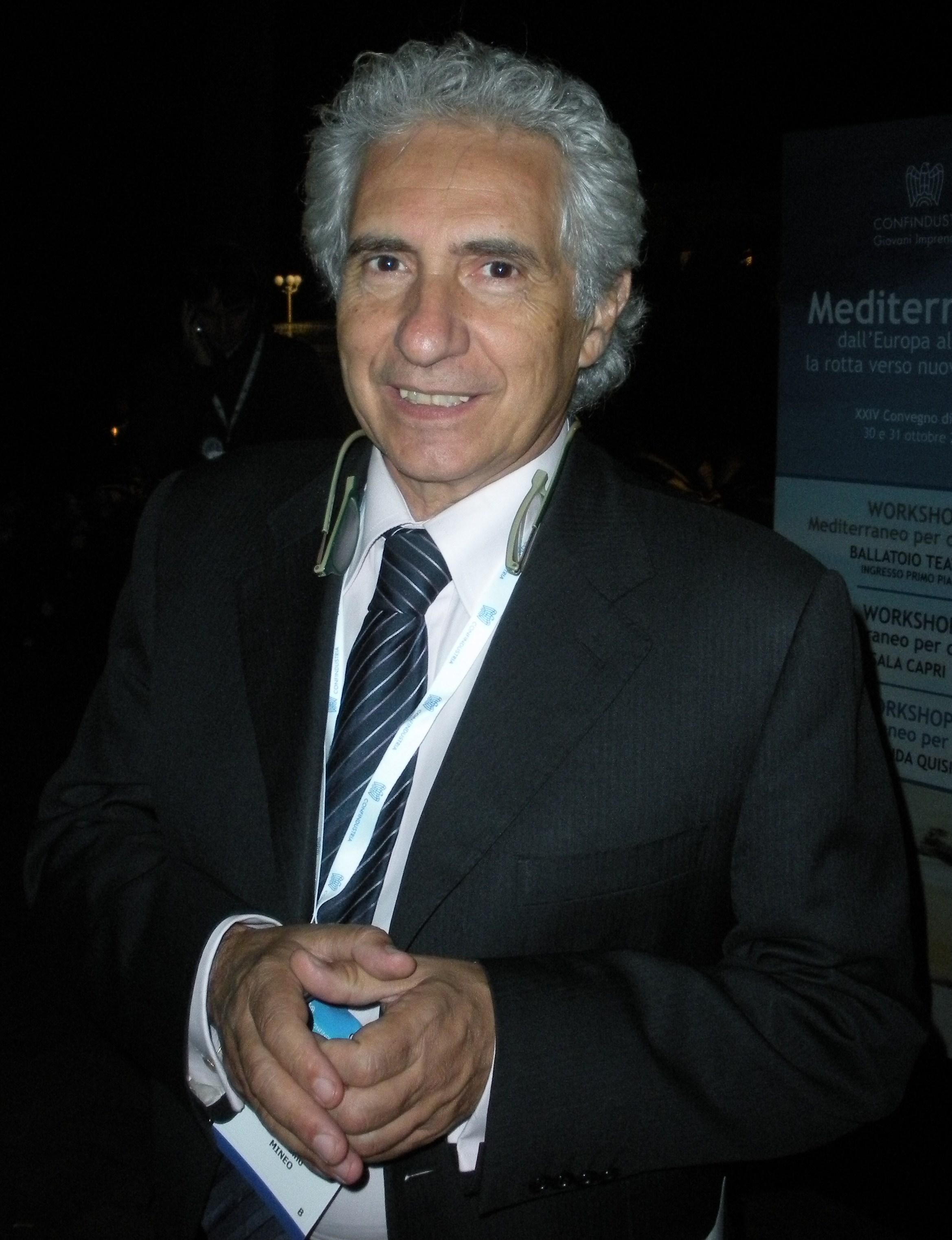

Member of the Italian Senate
- In office 15 March 2013 – 23 March 2018

Personal details
- Born: 1 January 1950 (age 76) Partanna, Sicily, Italy
- Party: Democratic Party (till 2015); SEL (2015-2017); Italian Left (since 2017)
- Education: University of Palermo
- Occupation: Journalist and politician
- Website: http://www.corradinomineo.it/

Corradino Mineo (born 1 January 1950) is an Italian journalist and politician who served as member of the Italian Senate from 2013 to 2018.

From 2006 to 2013 he was director of the all-news channel RaiNews 24.

== Biography ==
Born in Partanna (in the province of Trapani), he lives in Rome. His paternal grandfather was Corradino Mineo, a mathematician from Palermo and a member of the Accademia dei Lincei; his father, Massimo, was a university professor of mathematics, while his mother taught mathematics at a high school. His uncle Mario, a politician, served as a deputy in the Sicilian Regional Assembly from 1947 to 1951, elected on the Popular Democratic Front (Italy) ticket in the Palermo district.

After earning a degree in Philosophy from the University of Palermo with a grade of 110 cum laude, with a thesis on the “Asian mode of production,” he began working at il manifesto in 1971, hired by Luigi Pintor, who transferred him to Turin as a correspondent in 1974. He has been a member of the Order of Journalists as a professional journalist since 1977. In 1978, he joined RAI as a news editor in the TGR Piedmont newsroom in Turin. In 1987, Director Sandro Curzi brought him to the national TG3 news program, where he first served as bureau chief and later as political editor-in-chief. In 1992, he was sent to Palermo on several occasions, where he covered the Capaci massacre and the Via d’Amelio massacre.
