= Stefano Fassina =

Italian economist and politician (born 1966)

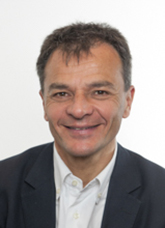

Deputy Minister of Economy and Finances
- In office 3 May 2013 – 4 January 2014
- Prime Minister: Enrico Letta
- Preceded by: Vittorio Grilli
- Succeeded by: Enrico Morando

Member of the Chamber of Deputies
- In office 15 March 2013 – 13 October 2022
- Constituency: Lazio 1

Personal details
- Born: 17 April 1966 (age 60) Rome, Italy
- Party: Democratic Party (2009–2015); Future to the Left (2015); Italian Left (2015–2018); Fatherland and Constitution (since 2018)
- Education: Bocconi University

Stefano Fassina (born 17 April 1966) is an Italian economist and politician. He is a former member of the Chamber of Deputies and of Italy's Democratic Party. Since 2018, he is the leader of the left-wing political association Fatherland and Constitution.

== Biography ==
Born in Rome, Fassina was the university leader of the Youth Left in 1996. After graduating in economics from Bocconi University, he became consultant for the Italian Minister of Finance in Romano Prodi's government. From 2002 to 2005, he worked at the International Monetary Fund. In November 2009, Fassina started his political career as coordinator on economic issues for the Democratic Party. He was elected member of the Chamber of Deputies in 2012. On 2 May 2013, Fassina became the Italian Deputy Minister of Economy and Finances in the Enrico Letta government; he was dismissed on 4 January 2014, in disagreement with the new party leader Matteo Renzi's political line.

In May 2015, Fassina refused to support Renzi, who had become Prime Minister of Italy, and his proposal for a new Italian electoral law. On 23 June 2015, he announced his decision to leave the Democratic Party, saying Renzi was "taking the party too far to the right". He joined the Mixed Group of the Chamber of Deputies. In 2015, he proposed a "controlled disintegration of the Eurozone".

In September 2018, Fassina founded Fatherland and Constitution, a left-wing souverainist political association.

== Works ==
- Governare il mercato: le culture economiche del Partito democratico, 2013.
- Il lavoro prima di tutto, 2014.
- Lavoro e libertà, 2014.
