= Devis Dori =

Italian politician (born 1979)

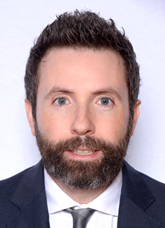
- Dori in 2022

Member of the Chamber of Deputies
- Incumbent
- Assumed office 23 March 2018
- Constituency: Lombardy 3 – P02 (2018–2022); Lombardy 2 – P02 (2022–present)

Personal details
- Born: 27 December 1979 (age 46)
- Party: Green Europe (since 2022)

Devis Dori (born 27 December 1979) is an Italian politician serving as a member of the Chamber of Deputies since 2018. He has served as chairman of the impeachment proceedings committee since 2024.
