= Francesco Laforgia =

Italian academic and politician (born 1978)

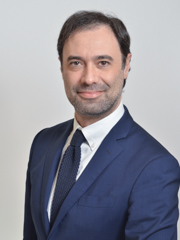

Member of the Senate of the Republic
- In office 23 March 2018 – 13 October 2022
- Constituency: Lombardy

Member of the Chamber of Deputies
- In office 15 March 2013 – 23 March 2018
- Constituency: Lombardy 1

Personal details
- Born: 1 February 1978 (age 48) Grumo Appula, Italy
- Party: PD (2007–2017; since 2023)
- Other political affiliations: Art.1 (2017–2019) èViva (2019–2023)
- Education: Bocconi University
- Occupation: Academic, politician

Francesco Laforgia (born 1 February 1978) is an Italian academic and politician.

== Early life and education ==
Born in Grumo Appula, Laforgia graduated in Economics and Social Sciences at the Bocconi University in 2002, specializing in innovation economics. He spent several periods of study and work abroad, where he perfected his knowledge of English and Spanish. After graduating, he continued to work in the university following several research projects, which were published by international journals. He received his PhD in Economics of Production and Development at the University of Insubria in Varese and taught Economics in several universities in Milan, Varese, Brescia, and Castellanza.

=== Political career ===
In 2010, Laforgia became the city coordinator of the Democratic Party (PD) in Milan and ceased his office when he has been elected a member of the Chamber of Deputies in the 2013 Italian general election. In May 2017, he presented an amendment to the financial institution to reduce the annual funds allocated to the Italian Institute of Technology of Genoa by 95%.

In 2017, Laforgia left the PD and took part to the new-born Article One – and Progressive Movement (Art.1), one of the three parties unified in Free and Equal (Leu). In the 2018 Italian general election, he was elected a member of the Senate of the Republic, becoming at the age of 40 the youngest senator of the Legislature XVIII of Italy. In 2019, he did not renew his membership to Art.1 and in April 2019 founded, together with Luca Pastorino and other LeU self-advocates, the èViva association in April 2019. In the 2019 European Parliament election in Italy, èViva supported The Left list, which did not reach the electoral threshold. After the election of Elly Schlein as the PD's new secretary in 2023, Laforgia returned to the party, joining its National Direction.
