= Luca Pastorino =

Italian politician (born 1971)

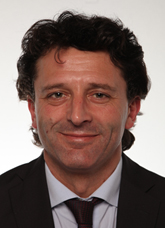

Member of the Chamber of Deputies
- Incumbent
- Assumed office 15 March 2013
- Constituency: Liguria (2013–2022); Genoa–Levante (since 2022)

Mayor of Bogliasco
- Incumbent
- Assumed office 4 October 2021
- Preceded by: Gianluigi Brisca
- In office 28 May 2006 – 6 June 2016
- Preceded by: Pietro Canepa
- Succeeded by: Gianluigi Brisca

Personal details
- Born: 30 September 1971 (age 55) Genoa, Italy
- Party: PD (2009-2015; since 2023); Possible (2015–2019) èViva (2019–2023)
- Education: University of Genoa
- Occupation: Politician, financial advisor

Luca Pastorino (born 30 September 1971) is an Italian politician and a member of the Italian Chamber of Deputies since 2013. In 2019, he co-founded èViva with Francesco Laforgia.

== Biography ==
Graduated in Business Economics at the University of Genoa, Pastorino began his career in 2000 as a financial advisor, but his political career had already begun a few years earlier: from 1997 to 2006 he has been a city councilor in Bogliasco. In 2006, Pastorino has been elected Mayor of Bogliasco, supported by the centre-left coalition of The Union and held his seat for two consecutive terms, from 2006 to 2016.

In occasion of the 2013 general election, Pastorino is elected to the Chamber of Deputies with the Democratic Party, and became one of the Giuseppe Civati's supporters inside the party.

In 2015, together with Civati and few others, Pastorino leaves the Democratic Party after having criticized Matteo Renzi's policies and, after Sergio Cofferati's proposal, ran for the charge of President of Liguria at the 2015 regional election, receiving support from Civati's new-born party Possible and Left Ecology Freedom: Pastorino ranks fourth.

In occasion of the 2018 election, Pastorino is elected once again to the Chamber of Deputies with the left-wing coalition of Free and Equal becoming the only member of Possible elected to the Parliament.
