= Pietro Grasso =

Italian anti-mafia magistrate and politician (born 1945)

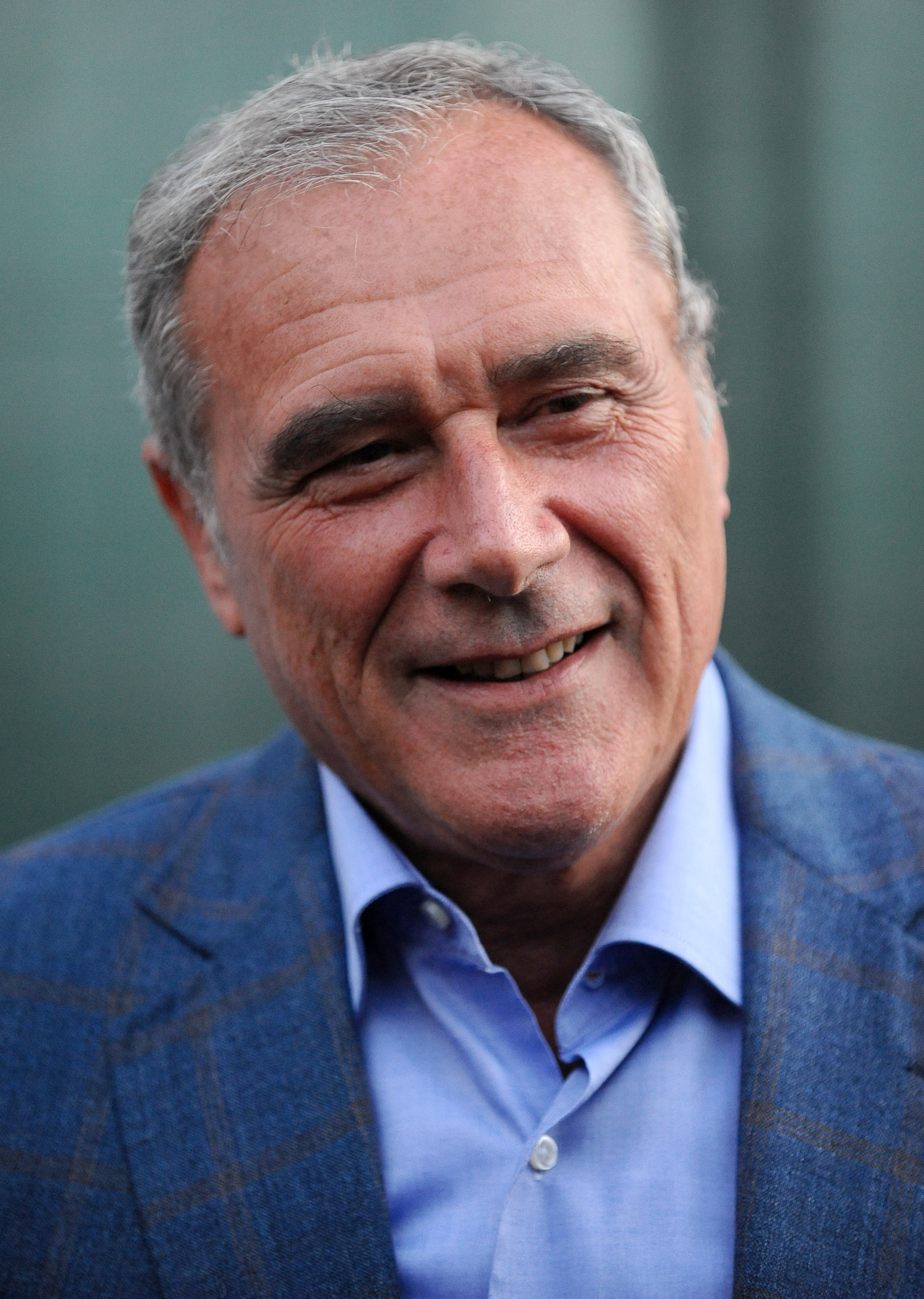
- Grasso in 2012

President of the Senate of the Republic
- In office 16 March 2013 – 22 March 2018
- Preceded by: Renato Schifani
- Succeeded by: Elisabetta Casellati

Acting President of Italy
- In office 14 January 2015 – 3 February 2015
- Prime Minister: Matteo Renzi
- Preceded by: Giorgio Napolitano
- Succeeded by: Sergio Mattarella

Member of the Senate of the Republic
- In office 15 March 2013 – 12 October 2022
- Constituency: Lazio (2013–2018); Sicily (2018–2022)

National Antimafia Prosecutor
- In office 11 October 2005 – 27 December 2012
- Preceded by: Pierluigi Vigna
- Succeeded by: Giusto Sciacchitano

Personal details
- Born: 1 January 1945 (age 81) Licata, Italy
- Party: PD (2013–2017); Independent (since 2018)
- Other political affiliations: LeU (2017–2022)
- Spouse: Maria Fedele (m. 1970; died 2025)
- Children: 1 son
- Education: University of Palermo

Pietro Grasso (Italian pronunciation: [ˈpjɛːtro ˈɡrasso]; born 1 January 1945), also known as Piero Grasso, is an Italian anti-mafia magistrate and politician who served as President of the Senate from 2013 to 2018.

Grasso became the Acting President of Italy on 14 January 2015, upon the resignation of Giorgio Napolitano. He was the president until the swearing in of Sergio Mattarella on 3 February.

== Judicial career ==
=== Maxiprocesso ===
In 1984 he was appointed associate judge in the first maxiprocesso (a portmanteau of the Italian words for maximum and trial) of the Sicilian Mafia (10 February 1986 – 10 December 1987), with 475 defendants. Pietro Grasso, next to the presiding judge Alfonso Giordano, was the author of the judgment (over 8,000 pages) that inflicted 19 life sentences and more than 2,600 years in prison.

At the end of the maxiprocesso, Grasso was appointed consultant to the Anti-Mafia Commission, at the head of Gerardo Chiaromonte first and then by Luciano Violante. In 1991, he was appointed adviser to the criminal affairs department of the Ministry of Justice, whose minister was Claudio Martelli, whom he named Giovanni Falcone, and a member of the Central Commission for the repentant. He was then replaced in his role, until he was appointed deputy prosecutor at the National Anti-Mafia Directorate (led by Pier Luigi Vigna), applied in the Prosecutor's Office of Palermo and Florence, where he supervised and coordinated the investigations on the massacres of 1992 and 1993.

In Palermo by the Public Prosecutor in August 1999, under his direction, from 2000 to 2004, 1,779 people were arrested for crimes of mafia fugitives and 13, which were included in the 30 most dangerous. During the same period, the prosecutor of Palermo scored 380 life sentences and hundreds of sentences for a total of thousands of years in prison.

=== National Antimafia Prosecutor ===
On 11 October 2005, he was appointed National Antimafia Prosecutor, succeeding Pierluigi Vigna, who left office in August 2005, having reached the retirement age, while he was still head of the prosecutor of Palermo. His appointment was at the centre of bitter controversy in judicial and political circles, as it was very likely the appointment of the Prosecutor at the Court of Palermo, Gian Carlo Caselli. However, the Berlusconi III Cabinet, in the person of Senator Luigi Bobbio (National Alliance), introduced an amendment to the delegation of the reform of the judicial system (the so-called "Reform Castelli"). According to the wording of the amendment, Caselli could no longer be appointed national anti-Mafia prosecutor for exceeding the age limit. The Constitutional Court, following the appointment of Peter Grasso as a new national anti-Mafia prosecutor, declared illegal the decision that the judge had ruled Gian Carlo Caselli out of the competition.

On 11 April 2006 help with his work, after years of investigation, the capture of Bernardo Provenzano on the farm, Montagna dei cavalli in Corleone, hiding from 9 May 1963. On 18 September 2006, the District Anti-Mafia Directorate of Catanzaro, with support from the National Prosecution led by national prosecutor Grasso, concluded a two-year on the action of certain mafias of Vibo Valentia, who had taken control of his holiday parks on the coast. The gangs in question are The Rose of Tropea and that of Mancuso Limbadi, which ricavavano huge profits from the control of contracts for the construction and supply of holiday villages in the area of Catanzaro. Operation Odyssey ends with 41 cases of custody. The natural expiration of the first term of the DNA was confirmed by the Supreme Judicial Council for a second term, this time without any controversy and consensus.

From September 2012 to Rai History in 12 episodes, Pietro Grasso leads "Lessons Mafia", a project of legal education, dedicated to the younger generations to explain all the secrets of Cosa Nostra. The program is inspired by the lessons mafia devised in 1992 by the Director of TG2 Alberto La Volpe with Giovanni Falcone, one of the last initiatives of the magistrate from Palermo crushed by the attack of Capaci. Twenty years later, solicited in this regard, Grasso agreed to go back to tell young people about the Mafia. Mafia lessons digs into the mafia system and returns an x-ray done of names, rules, stories, web of complicity, plots, mystery, ambiguity. In the first episode explained how the dome formed the Mafia.

== Political career ==
=== Senator ===
On 27 December 2012, Grasso requested leave of absence from the CSM, and the next day told the press that he intended to stand for election with the centre-left Democratic Party in the 2013 Italian general election. On 8 January 2013, the national leadership of the Democratic Party candidate Pietro Grasso was elected in the Italian Senate as a candidate of the list PD for the Lazio region.

In March, following the general election, along with many other colleagues in the Italian Parliament, Grasso joined the project "starts again in the future" by signing the petition that aims to review the anti-corruption law by changing the norm on the exchange-electoral political mafia within the first hundred days of parliamentary activity.

=== President of the Senate ===
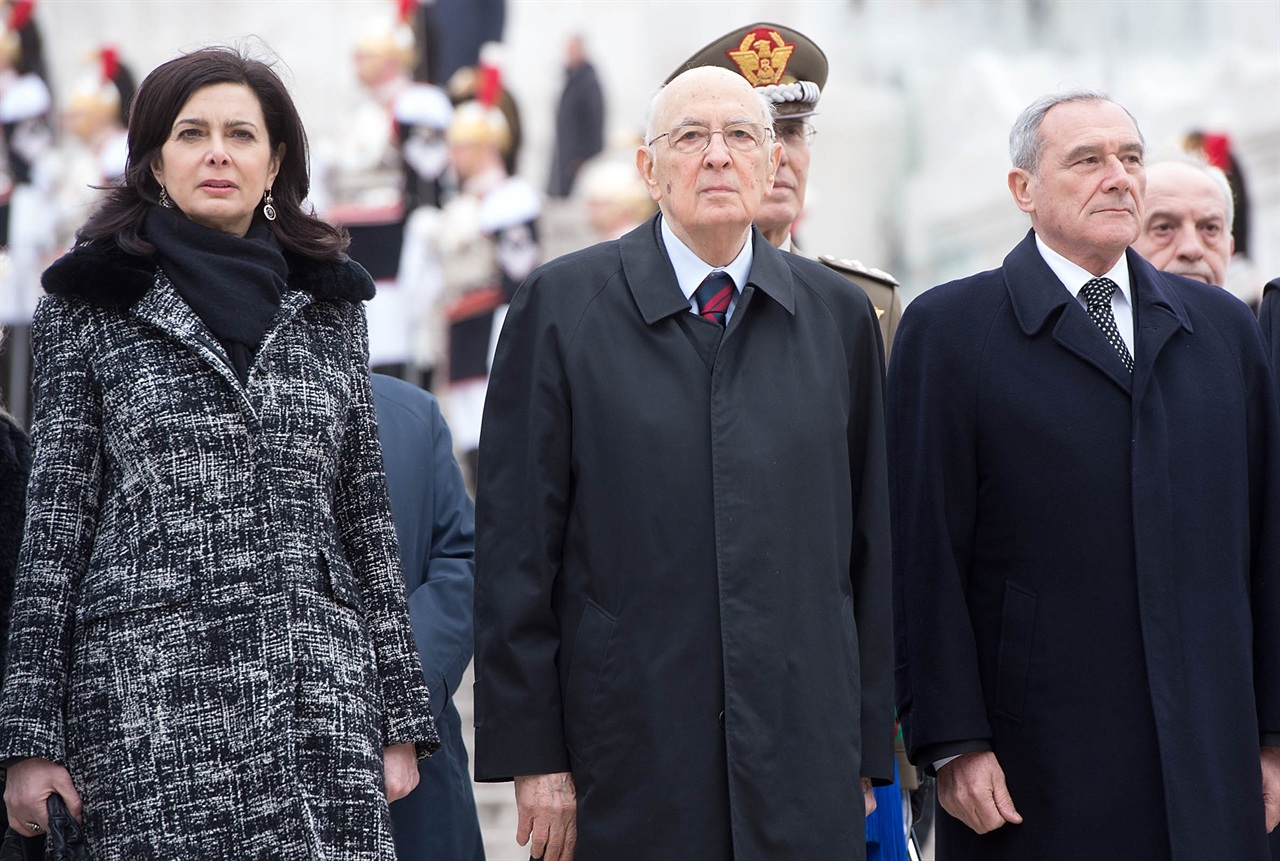
Grasso with President Giorgio Napolitano and the president of the Chamber of Deputies Laura Boldrini

On 16 March 2013, at 18:50, he was elected President of the Senate by 137 votes, against 117 for Renato Schifani (PdL), the outgoing President. There was a fourth ballot runoff between the two most voted senators from the previous ballot, with 313 voters in total, including 52 blank and 7 nil.

As President of the Senate, it was his responsibility to decide whether the Senate would declare itself as an injured party in an indictment against Berlusconi. The former Prime Minister was accused of bribing the majority of senators to have them withdraw support from the Prodi government. Grasso decided to go ahead against the advice of a Senate parliamentary committee, which voted 10 to 8 against the indictment.

On 14 January 2015, on the resignation of Giorgio Napolitano, Grasso became the Acting President of the Italian Republic. He served in that position until the swearing in of Sergio Mattarella on 3 February 2015.

Grasso left the Democratic Party on 26 October 2017, the same day the new electoral law (colloquially known by the nickname Rosatellum bis) was approved definitively by the Senate.

=== Leader of Free and Equal ===
On 3 December 2017, Grasso was appointed leader of Free and Equal (LeU), a left-wing political alliance of parties, formed by the Democratic and Progressive Movement, Italian Left and Possible.

Legal offices
Preceded by Giancarlo Caselli	Prosecutor for Palermo; 1999–2005	Succeeded by Francesco Messineo
Preceded by Pierluigi Vigna	National Antimafia Prosecutor; 2005–2012	Succeeded by Giusto Sciacchitano; Acting
Political offices
Preceded by Renato Schifani	President of the Italian Senate; 2013–2018	Succeeded by Elisabetta Casellati
Preceded by Giorgio Napolitano	President of Italy; Acting; 2015	Succeeded by Sergio Mattarella
Party political offices
Position established	Leader of Free and Equal; 2017–2018	Position abolished
