= Nicola Fratoianni =

Italian politician

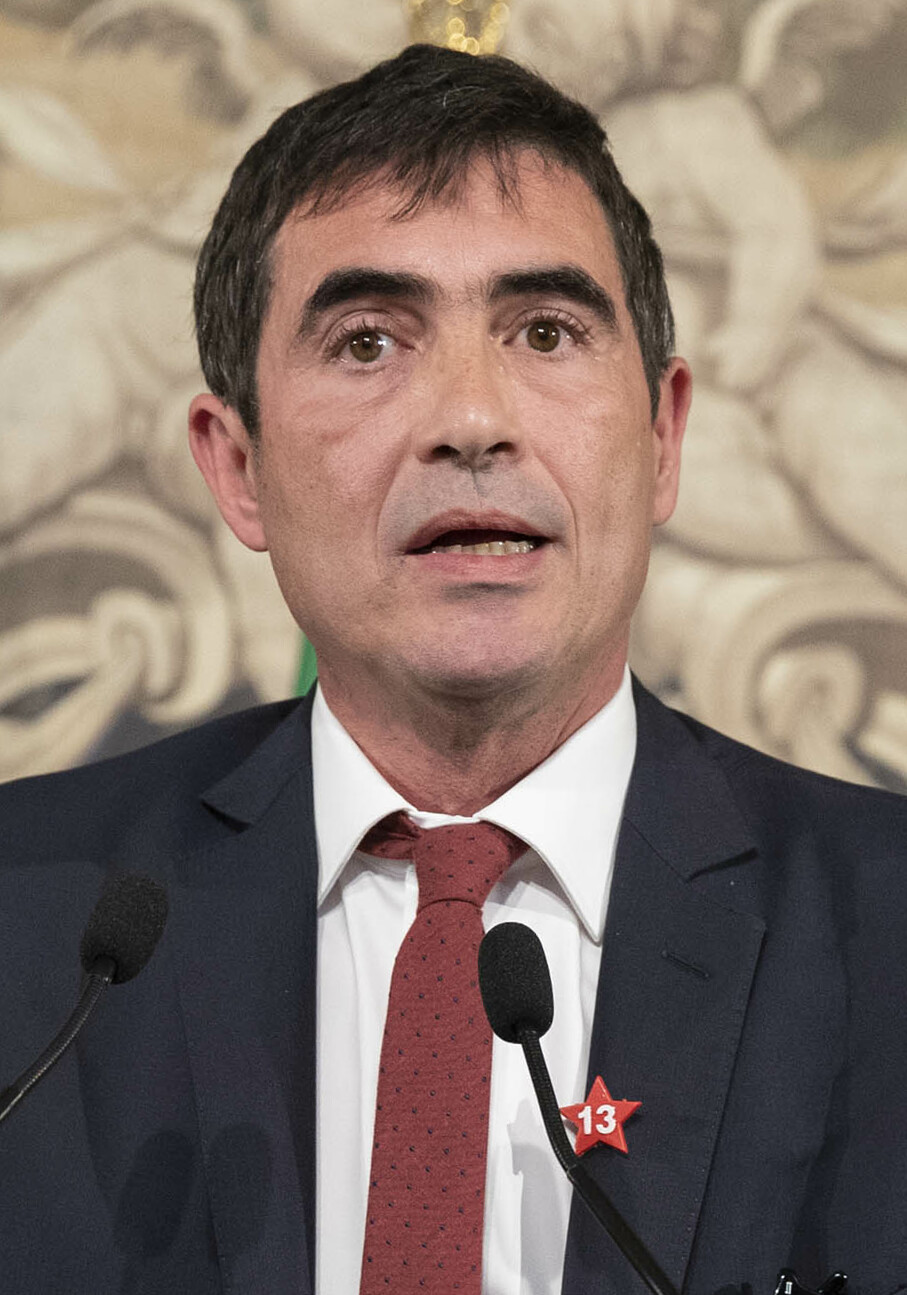
- Fratoianni in 2022

Secretary of Italian Left
- Incumbent
- Assumed office 2 February 2021
- Preceded by: Claudio Grassi (interim)
- In office 19 February 2017 – 1 June 2019
- Preceded by: Position established
- Succeeded by: Claudio Grassi (interim)

Member of the Chamber of Deputies
- Incumbent
- Assumed office 15 March 2013
- Constituency: Apulia (2013–2018); Piedmont 2 (2018–2022); Tuscany (since 2022)

Personal details
- Born: 4 October 1972 (age 53) Pisa, Italy
- Party: PRC (1992–2009); SEL (2009–2016); SI (2017–present)
- Other political affiliations: AVS (2022–present)
- Spouse: Elisabetta Piccolotti (m. 2019)
- Children: Adriano
- Education: University of Pisa
- Profession: Politician

Nicola Fratoianni (born 4 October 1972) is an Italian politician, member of the Chamber of Deputies, secretary of Italian Left from 2017 to 2019 and again since 2021, and co-leader of Greens and Left Alliance.

== Biography ==
Fratoianni was born in Pisa to parents from Ururi, province of Campobasso, Molise.

In 1992 he joined Communist Refoundation, and later became national leader of its youth organization. In those years, he also obtained his degree in philosophy.

Fratoianni is considered the leader of the left-wing faction, which opposed an alliance with the centre-left Democratic Party when it was led by Matteo Renzi. Fratoianni's aim is to create a left-wing party inspired by the Greek Syriza of Alexis Tsipras and the Spanish Podemos of Pablo Iglesias Turrión.

== Personal life ==
Fratoianni lives in Foligno, in province of Perugia, with his wife Elisabetta Piccolotti (former national spokesperson for the Young Communists and since 2022 deputy of the Italian Left), with whom he has a son, Adriano, born in 2013. Nicola and Elisabetta got married civilly in Foligno on 3 September 2019, in front of Nichi Vendola (his friend and close political collaborator), who celebrated the wedding.

He is concerned about the environment and supports activism against pollution.

He is an atheist.

== Political positions ==
Regarding the economy, Fratoianni stated that "the times we are living in no longer call for partial adjustments to a destructive mechanism; we must now urgently create the conditions for the critique and overcoming of the violent and predatory nature of capitalism and patriarchy to become a cultural hegemony, a hope for a new history of humanity", furthermore denouncing the damage caused to the ecosystem by the exclusive pursuit of profit. He has criticized the concentration of wealth in Italy, advocating for a wealth tax and a tax reform to make the system more progressive.

Regarding the bill proposing the adoption of the IHRA definition of antisemitism, Fratoianni declared his opposition, supporting the Jerusalem Declaration on Antisemitism, and further criticizing the IHRA example that classifies comparing the Israeli government to the Nazis as "antisemitism", while considering it historically inaccurate.

He also described the Netanyahu government as fascist, as well as "supremacist, racist, and colonialist", and responsible for ethnic cleansing and genocide, also accusing the Italian government of being complicit in Israeli war crimes. He supported the Global Sumud Flotilla, describing Israel as a terrorist state for the kidnapping of people on board, and supports the recognition of the state of Palestine.

On social issues, Fratoianni supports the legalization of cannabis, altruistic surrogacy,, same-sax marriage, adoptions by same-sex couples and single individuals, medically assisted reproduction for single women and lesbian couples, and jus soli.
