= Massimiliano Smeriglio =

Italian politician (born 1966)

Massimiliano Smeriglio MEP
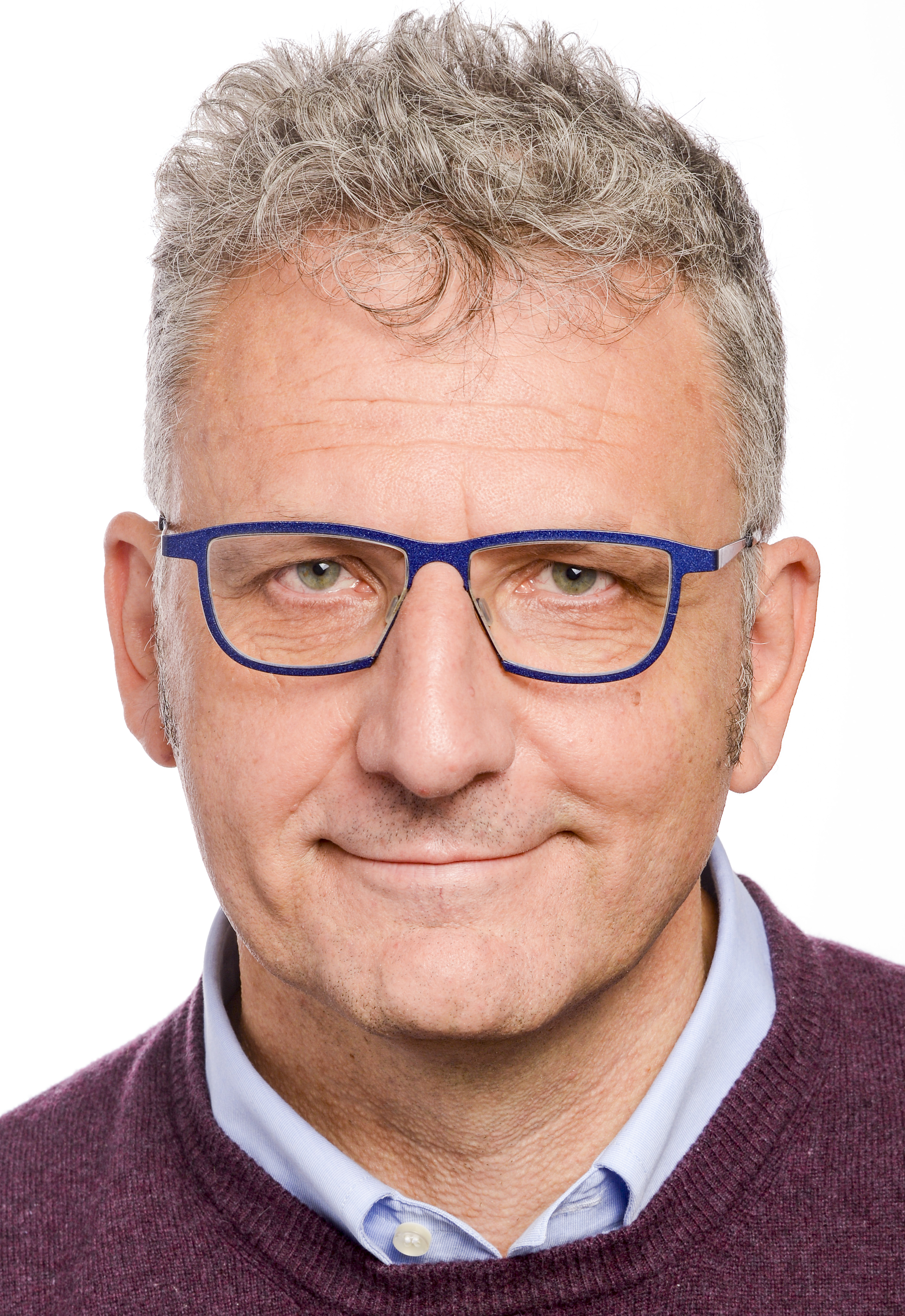

Member of the European Parliament
- In office 2 July 2019 – 15 July 2024
- Constituency: Central Italy

Vicepresident of Lazio
- In office 23 March 2013 – 19 April 2019
- President: Nicola Zingaretti

Member of the Chamber of Deputies
- In office 15 March 2013 – 16 April 2013
- In office 28 April 2006 – 28 April 2008
- Constituency: Lazio

Personal details
- Born: 8 May 1966 (age 60) Rome, Italy
- Party: PRC (until 2009); SEL (2009–2016); CP (2017); PD (2018–2024); AVS (2024)
- Education: Sapienza University of Rome
- Occupation: University professor, writer, politician

Massimiliano Smeriglio (born 8 May 1966 in Rome) is an Italian politician, writer, university professor, and member of the European Parliament.

In 2006, he was elected to the Chamber of Deputies on the Communist Refoundation Party list. He was re-elected in 2013, among the ranks of SEL, but he gave up the seat in the Chamber of Deputies to serve as Vice-president of the Lazio region in the government led by Nicola Zingaretti.

== European Parliament ==
In the 2019 European Parliament election in Italy, Smeriglio was elected as a Member of the European Parliament on the Democratic Party list, as a member of Futura political association headed by Laura Boldrini. He has since been serving on the Committee on Culture and Education and on the Committee on Petitions.

Smeriglio voted against the European Parliament resolution of 23 November 2022 on recognising the Russian Federation as a state sponsor of terrorism.

Smeriglio ran again as a MEP in the 2024 European elections on the AVS list without being elected.
