= Federico Fornaro =

Italian politician (born 1962)

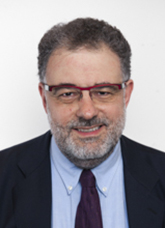
- Fornaro in 2018

Member of the Chamber of Deputies
- Incumbent
- Assumed office 23 March 2018
- Constituency: Piedmont 2 – 01 (2018–2022); Piedmont 2 – 01 (2022–present)

Member of the Senate
- In office 15 March 2013 – 22 March 2018
- Constituency: Piedmont

Personal details
- Born: 9 December 1962 (age 63)
- Party: Democratic Party

Federico Fornaro (born 9 December 1962) is an Italian politician serving as a member of the Chamber of Deputies since 2018. From 2013 to 2018, he was a member of the Senate. From 2004 to 2014, he served as mayor of Castelletto d'Orba.
