= Alfredo D'Attorre =

Italian politician (born 1973)

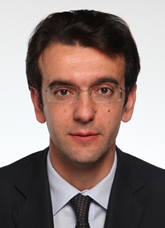
- D'Attorre in 2013

Member of the Chamber of Deputies
- In office 15 March 2013 – 22 March 2018
- Constituency: Calabria

Personal details
- Born: 30 August 1973 (age 52)
- Party: Democratic Party (2007–2015, 2023–present)

Alfredo D'Attorre (born 30 August 1973) is an Italian politician serving as secretary for university policy of the Democratic Party since 2023.. From 2013 to 2018, he was a member of the Chamber of Deputies.

== Biography ==
Born in Melfi, in the province of Potenza, he lives in Rome.

Admitted to the Scuola Normale Superiore in Pisa in 1992, he earned his bachelor’s degree in philosophy in 1997. He then earned a Ph.D. in philosophy and the humanities from the Sant'Anna School of Advanced Studies in Pisa.

He has undertaken study and research stays in Munich, Saarbrücken, Oxford, and Berlin.

He has published essays on political and legal theory in various national and international academic journals, as well as two monographs: Why Do People Obey? Max Weber and the Analysis of Human Sociality (Naples, 2004) and Europe and the Return of the ‘Political’: Law and Sovereignty in the Integration Process (Turin, 2020).

He is currently an associate professor of philosophy of law at the University of Salerno.
