= List of Italian Communist Party politicians =

A list of notable politicians of the Italian Communist Party:

== A ==
- Marisa Abbondanzieri
- Nicola Adamo
- Paolo Alatri
- Mario Alicata
- Giorgio Amendola
- Gavino Angius
- Giulio Carlo Argan
- Walter Audisio

== B ==
- Franco Bassanini
- Antonio Bassolino
- Roberto Battaglia
- Katia Bellillo
- Enrico Berlinguer
- Giovanni Berlinguer
- Luigi Berlinguer
- Mario Berlinguer
- Pier Luigi Bersani
- Fausto Bertinotti
- Ranuccio Bianchi Bandinelli
- Sandro Bondi
- Amadeo Bordiga
- Willer Bordon
- Mercedes Bresso
- Claudio Burlando

== C ==
- Massimo Cacciari
- Giusto Catania
- Sergio Chiamparino
- Giulietto Chiesa
- Massimo Cialente
- Lucio Colletti
- Paola Concia
- Ludovico Corrao
- Armando Cossutta
- Rosario Crocetta

== D ==
- Massimo D'Alema
- Michele D'Amico
- Francescopaolo D'Angelosante
- Pancrazio De Pasquale
- Giuseppe Di Vittorio
- Oliviero Di Liberto
- Guido Di Alberto

== E ==
- Vasco Errani

== F ==
- Italo Falcomatà
- Guido Fanti
- Piero Fassino
- Bruno Ferrero
- Anna Finocchiaro
- Sergio Flamigni
- Aniello Formisano
- Loris Fortuna

== G ==
- Corrado Gabriele
- Carlo Alberto Galluzzi
- Sergio Garavini
- Natalia Ginzburg
- Antonio Giolitti
- Franco Giordano
- Anselmo Gouthier
- Antonio Gramsci
- Claudio Grassi
- Ruggero Grieco
- Franco Grillini
- Renato Guttuso

== I ==
- Pietro Ingrao
- Nilde Iotti
- Felice Ippolito

== L ==
- Pio La Torre
- Girolamo Li Causi
- Maria Rita Lorenzetti

== M ==
- Lucio Magri
- Francesca Marinaro
- Graziella Mascia
- Teresa Mattei
- Raffaele Mattioli
- Alberto Moravia
- Roberto Musacchio
- Fabio Mussi

== N ==
- Pasqualina Napoletano
- Giorgio Napolitano
- Alessandro Natta
- Diego Novelli

== O ==
- Achille Occhetto
- Gianni Oliva
- Andrea Orlando

== P ==
- Giancarlo Pajetta
- Pasquale Panico
- Giovanni Pesce
- Claudio Petruccioli
- Luigi Pintor
- Barbara Pollastrini

== R ==
- Tullio Regge
- Francesco Renda
- Giuseppe Ricci
- Carlo Ripa di Meana
- Marco Rizzo
- Rossana Rossanda

== S ==
- Cesare Salvi
- Edoardo Sanguineti
- Leonardo Sciascia
- Marina Sereni
- Altiero Spinelli

== T ==
- Palmiro Togliatti
- Aldo Tortorella
- Renzo Trivelli
- Livia Turco

== V ==
- Dacia Valent
- Maurizio Valenzi
- Walter Veltroni
- Nichi Vendola
- Ugo Vetere
- Vittorio Vidali
- Marta Vincenzi
- Luciano Violante
- Vincenzo Visco

== Z ==
- Flavio Zanonato
