= Luigi Pintor (politician, born 1925) =

Italian politician and journalist (1925–2003)

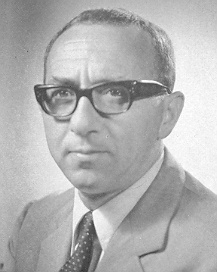

Member of the Chamber of Deputies
- In office 2 July 1987 – 22 April 1992
- Constituency: Florence
- In office 4 June 1968 – 24 May 1972
- Constituency: Cagliari

Personal details
- Born: 18 September 1925 Rome, Italy
- Died: 17 May 2003 (aged 77) Rome, Italy
- Party: PCI (1948–1969); PdUP (1974–1984); Independent Left (1987–1992)
- Occupation: Journalist, politician

Luigi Pintor (18 September 1925 – 17 May 2003) was an Italian politician and journalist.

== Early life, education, and World War II ==
After spending his childhood in Cagliari and acquiring the gymnasium license, at the outbreak of World War II Pintor left Sardinia to reach Rome with his mother and two sisters, where, shortly after, he learned of his father's death.

He joined the Italian resistance movement in 1943 as a member of the Patriotic Action Groups, after learning that his brother Giaime was killed after stepped on a mine. On 14 May 1944, Pintor was arrested by the fascists, tortured and imprisoned at Regina Coeli, waiting for a death sentence; luckily, Pintor was freed one month later during the Liberation of Rome.

== Career ==
After the end of the war, Pintor began his journalistic career at L'Unità, becoming co-editor-in-chief of the Roman edition. He left the newspaper in 1965.

A member of the Italian Communist Party, Pintor was very close to the left wing of the party, led by Pietro Ingrao, and opposed Giorgio Amendola's project of unifying the PCI with other left-wing of centre-left parties. After the 1968 election, Pintor is elected to the Chamber of Deputies for the Italian Communist Party (PCI), which he left after the 1968 invasion of Czechoslovakia by the Soviet Union. In 1969, Pintor was one of the founders, together with Lucio Magri, Rossana Rossanda and Luciana Castellina, of the left-wing newspaper Il manifesto, where he was later appointed editor-in-chief from 1971 to 1975, from 1976 to 1978 and again from 1991 to 1995.

In the 1980s, after having been a member of the Proletarian Unity Party (PdUP), Pintor was again elected to the Chamber of Deputies in the 1987 election as an independent on the PCI list, and joined the parliamentary group of the Independent Left. After the end of his political career, Pintor continued to write for Il manifesto until his death on 17 May 2003, at the age of 77.
