= Famiano Crucianelli =

Italian politician and surgeon

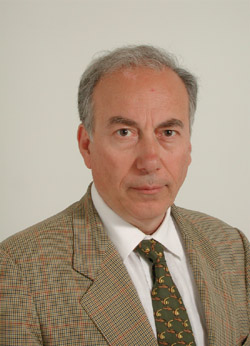

Member of the Chamber of Deputies
- In office 1979–1987
- In office 1992–2006

Personal details
- Born: 1 January 1948 (age 78) Rome, Lazio, Italy
- Party: PdUP (1974–1984); PCI (1984–1991); PRC (1991–1995); MCU (1995–1998); DS (1998–2007); SD (2007–2008); PD (since 2008)
- Profession: Politician, surgeon

Famiano Crucianelli (born 1 January 1948 in Rome) is an Italian politician and surgeon.

== Biography ==
A graduated in medicine and a surgeon, Crucianelli was one of the founders of Il manifesto, the eponymous newspaper of the political group previously expelled from the Italian Communist Party (PCI).

With the Manifesto he participated in the creation of the Proletarian Unity Party for Communism (PdUP), for which he was elected deputy in 1979, taking over from a resigner. He was then elected in 1983 on a PCI-PdUP joint list.

He returned to the Chamber of Deputies with the Communist Refoundation Party in 1992 and 1994. In March 1995 he voted the confidence to the Dini Cabinet, along with 14 other PRC deputies who had not accepted the directives imposed by the party. These rebel deputies left the PRC and founded the Movement of Unitarian Communists, of which Crucianelli was leader. The movement presented itself in the 1996 general elections into the PDS list and Crucianelli was re-elected deputy.

In 1998 Crucianelli and the Unitarian Communists joined the Democrats of the Left and in 2001 was re-elected to the Chamber of Deputies with this party. From 18 May 2006 to 8 May 2008 he served in the second Prodi government as undersecretary for foreign affairs. In 2007 he joined the Democratic Left, which he later abandoned in 2008 to join the Democratic Party.
