= Reichlin =

Reichlin is a surname. Notable people with the surname include:

- Alfredo Reichlin (1925–2017), Italian journalist and politician
- Bruno Reichlin (born 1941), Swiss architect
- Karl Reichlin (1841–1924), Swiss politician
- Lucrezia Reichlin (born 1954), Italian economist, daughter of Alfredo
