= Ingrao =

- Pronunciation: Italian: [iŋˈɡraː.o]
- Language: Italian

Origin
- Language: Sicilian
- Origin: 'ngarau
- Meaning: 'drunken'

Other names
- Variant form: Ingarao

Ingrao is a surname. Notable people with the surname include:

- Charles Ingrao (born 1948), historian and public intellectual
- Chiara Ingrao (born 1949), Italian politician
- Francesco Ingrao (1843–1918), Italian politician
- Ignazio Ingrao (born 1969), Italian journalist
- Marco Ingrao (born 1982), Belgian-Italian footballer
- Pietro Ingrao (1915–2015), Italian politician and journalist
