= Movement of Unitarian Communists =

Italian political party

Movement of Unitarian Communists Movimento dei Comunisti Unitari
- Leader: Famiano Crucianelli
- Founded: 14 June 1995
- Dissolved: 14 February 1998
- Split from: Communist Refoundation Party
- Merged into: Democrats of the Left
- Ideology: Communism
- Political position: Left-wing
- National affiliation: The Olive Tree

The Movement of Unitarian Communists (Movimento dei Comunisti Unitari, MCU), or simply Unitarian Communists (Italian: Comunisti Unitari), was a communist political party in Italy.

== History ==
The party was founded in June 1995 as a split from the Communist Refoundation Party (PRC) by Communist MPs who had endorsed the vote of confidence in the government of Lamberto Dini (which was also supported by the Democratic Party of the Left, the Italian People's Party and Lega Nord) in March 1995.

Most members of the MCU were formerly of the Proletarian Unity Party (PdUP); the PdUP had merged with the Italian Communist Party (PCI) in 1984, only to leave it when the PCI abandoned communism and reformed as the Democratic Party of the Left (PDS) in 1991. At that time most ex-PdUP members joined the PRC.

The leading politicians who formed the MCU included Sergio Garavini, Lucio Magri, Luciana Castellina, Famiano Crucianelli, Luciano Pettinari, Ersilia Salvato, Rino Serri, Marida Bolognesi and Walter Bielli. 16 out of 57 PRC parliamentarians and 2 MEPs joined the MCU. In the 1996 general election, the MCU was part of The Olive Tree, and presented some candidates in the electoral lists of the PDS as "PDS – European Left".

In February 1998, the MCU and other small parties merged with the PDS to form the Democrats of the Left (DS).
