= Covatta =

Covatta is a surname. Notable people with the surname include:

- Giobbe Covatta (born 1956), Italian stand-up comedian, actor, writer, and politician
- Luigi Covatta (1943–2021), Italian politician and journalist
