= Marianella Sclavi =

Italian sociologist

Marianella Pirzio Biroli Sclavi (born 1943) is an Italian activist, ethnographer, and writer.

She has taught urban ethnography, the art of listening, and conflict management at the Polytechnic University of Milan, and has collaborated for years on projects for the redevelopment of neighborhoods in crisis. She additionally collaborates on projects to redevelop city neighbourhoods.

== Biography ==
Sclavi was a student at the University of Trento from 1962 until her graduation in 1968 with a degree in sociology. During this time, she became involved with the Italian student protests of the 1960s, and her experiences would push her towards a philosophy of nonviolence. She then became a leading figure in Partito di Unità Proletaria, a socialist political party that later unified with the left-wing newspaper il manifesto in 1974. She was also a member of il manifesto after the unification.

From 1984 to 1992, she lived with her family in New York, where she studied urbanist groups in South Bronx, chronicling her experiences in two books: A una spanna da terra and La Signora va nel Bronx. In these books, she developed a "humorous methodology" of ethnographic mapping. After her return to Italy in 1993 until 2008, she was an instructor at the Polytechnic University of Milan. Her areas of expertise are the redevelopment of neighbourhoods in crisis and public works projects.

In 2005, she was a visiting professor at the Massachusetts Institute of Technology's Department of Urban and Environmental Planning and Harvard Law School's Program on Negotiation. Since 2006, she has collaborated with the Lawrence Susskind's Consensus Building Institute in Boston. She is also an educator for the University of Amsterdam's Master on Conflict and Governance.

In 2008, she founded Ascolto Attivo (transl. active intelligence), a network that provides institutions such as citizens' groups, schools, and companies with active listening training. The network's other employees are Agnese Bertello and Stefania Lattuille.

She is a consultant for the "Ricalabria" project in Locride, where she handles the processes of reconstruction and conflict management in Kosovo and Israel-Palestine. The project is promoted by Progetto Sud and Goel.

== Bibliography ==
- Sclavi, Marianella (1974), Foa, Vittorio (ed.), Lotta di classe e organizzazione operaia (in Italian), G. Mazzotta, OL 5142947M.
- — (1989), A una spanna da terra: indagine comparativa su una giornata di scuola negli Stati Uniti e in Italia e i fondamenti di una metodologia umoristica (in Italian), Feltrinelli.
- — (1993), Ridere dentro: un seminario sull'umorismo in carcere con Renato Curcio, Maurizio Iannelli, Stefano Petrelli e Nicola Valentino (in Italian), Milano: Anabasi.
- — (2000), Arte di ascoltare e mondi possibili: come si esce dalle cornici di cui siamo parte (in Italian), Pescara: Le vespe.
- — (2002), Avventure Urbane. Progettare la città con gli abitanti (in Italian), Milano: Eleuthera.
- — (2008), La signora va nel Bronx [An Italian Lady Goes to the Bronx] (in Italian), translated by Martin, Henry, Milano: IPOC di Pietro Condemi, ISBN 9788895145204.
- —; Romano, S (2007), Costruire una pace. Per imparare a non credere nella fatalità delle guerre (in Italian), Milano: Bruno Mondadori.
- — (2007), Costruire una pace. Per imparare a non credere nella fatalità delle guerre (in Italian), Milano: Bruno Mondadori.
- — (2008-04-08), "The Role of Play and Humor in Creative Conflict Management", Negotiation Journal, 24 (2): 157–180, doi:10.1111/j.1571-9979.2008.00175.x
- — (2009), Ciao mamma, vado in Cina! (in Italian), Milano: IPOC.
- —; Susskind, Lawrence E. (2011), Confronto creativo: dal diritto di parola al diritto di essere ascoltati (in Italian), Milano.
