= Eva Cattermole =

Italian writer and poet

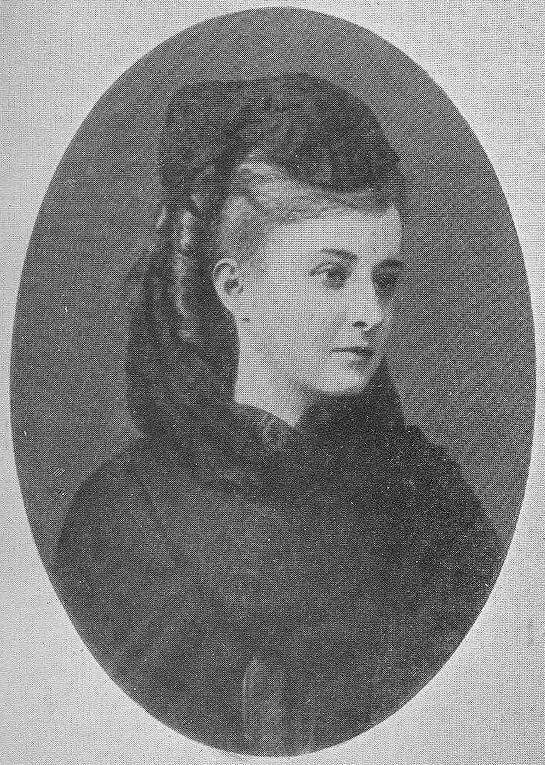
Eva Cattermole

Eva Giovanna Antonietta Cattermole (26 October 1849, Florence – 30 November 1896, Rome), better known as Evelina or Lina Cattermole, was an Italian writer and poet. She also wrote novellas and other works in prose. The majority of her works are signed with the pseudonym Contessa Lara.

In her youth, Cattermole frequented several prestigious salons, before holding one of her own. Cattermole created a court of admirers around herself who adored her for her beauty and charm. In 1875, she fled Milan in shame after her then-husband killed her lover in a duel with pistols. Finding success in her literary career, Cattermole later held a musical salon in Rome that was very successful.

In the final years of her life, Cattermole was involved in an abusive romantic relationship with the painter Giuseppe Pierantoni. During a fight between them, Pierantoni shot her in the abdomen before turning the revolver on himself, injuring himself in the armpit. In 1898, Pierantoni was sentenced to imprisonment for eleven years and eight months for voluntary murder.

== Biography ==
She was born in Florence, Grand Duchy of Tuscany, to Guglielmo Cattermole and Elisa Sandusch. Her father was a professor of English and her mother (his third wife) was a pianist. She had a brother and sister: Guglielmo and Eufrosina.

The exact details of Cattermole’s birth were controversial for many years. Angelo De Gubernatis in Dictionnaire international des écrivains du jour wrote that she was born October 23, 1858, in Cannes, Provence; and the same information is indicated by Guido Mazzoni in Ottocento. However, Eugenia Levi in Dai nostri poeti viventi, Benedetto Croce, and others affirm that she was born in Florence in 1851. In 1892, in a column she wrote while working for it:La Tribuna illustrata, Cattermole declared to have been born in France, and until her death claimed to have been born in Cannes in 1854. it:Maria Freschi Borgese found her original birth certificate in Florence, that proves incontrovertibly that she was born October 26, 1849, in Florence.

A description of Cattermole's infancy is offered in her novella La Rosona, contained in Storie d’amore e di dolore. She was very quick in her acquisition of music and foreign languages: she learned English very young, as well as French, Spanish, and Italian. She studied in Paris, at the Instituto Sacre Coeur. She received Italian lessons from the poet it:Marianna Giarré, who at the time was friends with Pietro Giannone, Aleardo Aleardi, Niccolò Tommaseo, Francesco Dall’Ongaro, Giovanni Prati, and Giosuè Carducci.

=== First works, Canti e Ghirlande ===
As is told in the story Cattermole herself shared, her first writings were written spontaneously, to accompany a bunch of flowers intended as a gift for her mother.

In 1867 her first collection Canti e Ghirlande was published by Cellini in Florence, with poems that show a clear influence from Aleardi, Prati, and Dall’Ongaro, but that received criticism from Benedetto Croce and Giosuè Carducci. The publication followed the death of Cattermole's mother.

The first part of the collection is dedicated to her father; the second to her sister; the third to Pietro Giannone, a Republican martyr; the fourth to Princess Elisa Poniatowska; the fifth to her friend Elvira Spannocchia; and the sixth to Marianna Giarré.

=== Childhood and marriage ===
Cattermole frequented several prestigious salons, including that of Laura Beatrice Oliva, called the Corinna Italica, wife of Pasquale Stanislao Mancini. Cattermole became friends with her daughters and, spending time in their circle, met Lieutenant of the Elite Infantry Francesco Eugenio Mancini. He was born in 1845 and was the third child of the Mancini family. They were married in 1871; and spent time in Rome and Naples before establishing themselves in Milan (in via Cesare Correnti).

In Milan, Cattermole continued to frequent various salons, including that of the Maffei family, before holding one of her own. She also spent time with those involved in the Scapigliatura movement, where she met Arrigo Boito, Giuseppe Rovani, it:Eugenio Torelli Viollier (founder of the Corriere della Sera), and Emilio Praga, who gifted Cattermole a book with a dedication to her.

Cattermole created a court of admirers around herself who adored her for her beauty and charm, while her husband spent increasing time away from home gambling or entertaining women from the theater. It was through her husband that Cattermole met a young Venetian banker named Giuseppe Bennati Baylon, who she fell in love with. With the help of her maid Giuseppina Dones, he became her lover.

Francesco noticed the gossip and forced the maid to tell him that the two would be meeting in an apartment on via dell’Unione, where in May 1875 he caught them in the act.

=== Divorce, scandal and poverty ===
Having discovered his wife's adultery gave Francesco the right to challenge the lover to a duel, according to the social norms of the era. The duel was carried out with pistols and ended tragically on June 7, 1875, with the death of Giuseppe. Following a trial on June 30, Francesco was absolved for the "omicidio d’onore".

At the same time, he requested a divorce and removed Cattermole from their home. The public scandal following these events was enormous, and she fled Milan in shame. Her father did not want to host her in Florence, where he had started a new family with Clementina Lazzeri after the death of his wife. After a brief return to Milan for Giuseppe's funeral, she lived in poverty in Florence before moving nearer to her grandmother (also in Florence). Her economic situation distressed her for a very long time, and forced her to publish poems and articles in magazines to make a living.

Slowly, she was able to pull herself out of ostracism and returned to frequenting the salons. Her relationship with her father and his new family improved, and Cattermole occasionally spent time with her new siblings. She was very attached to them, demonstrated by her lyric poems Ricordo d’Aprile written for her brother Fausto, and Parvula for her sister Esterina.

In the summer of 1875 she met the poet Mario Rapisardi. Their closeness gave rise to many rumors: the generally accepted theory comes from Cattermole herself who said it was only a friendship, despite one of the best biographies of the poet (written by his friend Alfio Tomaselli), supporting that she was his lover. In 1880 Cattermole’s life was upset by the death of her beloved grandmother, which she wrote about in Stanza chiusa and Il rosario della nonna.

=== Success ===
By 1884 Cattermole was an established writer, and many poets dedicated work to her. Between 1884 and 1894, she composed a collection of lyric poetry called Nuovi versi. In the meantime, she had been in several more or less stable relationships and was favored for her fame and beauty. She was searching for happiness and true love, but also met men who wanted to profit off her generosity and naivety.

In 1886 Cattermole moved several times, from Parma, to Milan, to Florence, before settling in Rome where she could easily find work. Her friendship with it:Giovanni Alfredo Cesareo, a Sicilian man 12 years her junior, became a steady relationship that would last until 1894. They had originally collaborated together for the Nabab magazine in January 1885. Their relationship brought her the joy of having a true family, something she had always yearned for. She considered it to be a marriage, as she expresses in her poetry.

Between 1886 and 1895 Cattermole wrote many of her prose works: Così è, L'innamorata, Novelle di Natale, Una famiglia di topi and Il romanzo della bambola, as well as republished Storie d’amore e di dolore. In 1886 she also published E ancora versi in Florence, for the Sersale publishing house.

In Rome, Cattermole held a musical salon that was very successful: it was attended, among many others, by Arturo Graf, Angelo De Gubernatis, the American sculptor Moë Ezekiel, the painter Guido Boggiani, the sculptor Niccolini, the painter Anna Forti, Luigi Capuana, the writer Pierre Loti, and several members of parliament. She maintained a good relationship with the writer and journalist Matilde Serao, despite her having given a negative review of Cattermole's Versi in 1883.

In November 1894 Cattermole ended her relationship with it:Giovanni Alfredo Cesareo during a period of depression. In that same year De Gubernatis sent her a collaborator with the magazine Vita italiana, Giuseppe Pierantoni. A Neapolitan painter of minor talents, he was working on a project adapting French models to Italian sensibilities. Cattermole already worked with the magazine and wrote a fashion column, and began helping Pierantoni by recommending him to her friends and inviting him to dine with her. In February 1895 they grew closer and began an intimate relationship.

They lived in Cattermole's home, supported solely on her income. She had a way of believing again (and many times over) in her own generosity, which had pushed her to help with every means a man with little propensity for work and who was possessive and volatile. She was unable to free herself of him, even trying to lock him out of the house in May 1896 after which he forcibly entered. She was encouraged by her friends to go to the authorities and report him, but she feared his reaction. In the summer of 1896, she went to a small village in Liguria, where she met with her longtime friend Ferruccio Bottini. She confided her problems to him, and he invited her to leave Giuseppe and be a guest of his family in Livorno. He also bought her a revolver to keep in her purse.

=== Death ===
Cattermole returned to Rome in October 1896, deciding to move to Livorno to take refuge with the Bottini family. However, during a still as-yet-unclear fight on November 30 in which Cattermole ordered Pierantoni to leave, he shot her in the abdomen before turning the revolver on himself, injuring himself in the armpit.

The pistol was a "woman’s model", i.e. with a small caliber, and Cattermole lived for a period after the incident. Pierantoni and the housemaid Luisa Medici eventually called a doctor, and the police followed several hours later.

Until the end, Cattermole insisted that the injury was motivated solely by economic interest, to ward off the many extenuations that juries in this time tended to apply to "crimes of passion".

A large crowd attended her funeral, but it was marked by scandal. The funds collected for the service vanished and there was not enough for an adequate burial. Her will indicated Ferruccio Bottini as the only heir, but he refused the bequest.

The trial against Pierantoni was carried out two years later at the Corte d’Assise in Rome, and caused an uproar. The Public Prosecutor, who called Pierantoni "l'assassino sfruttatore di donne", and the press with articles by Angelo De Gubernatis, it:Olga Ossani Lodi, Eugenio Rubichi (Richel), Gino Monaldi, Ferdinando Russo, and Mario Giobbe all reinforced the economic motive. Pierantoni's defense lawyer, Salvatore Barzilai, claimed a motive of passion. It was not possible to definitively prove either way what happened, and the trial ended November 10, 1898, with a jail sentence of eleven years and eight months for voluntary murder.

== Literary collaborations ==
Evelina Cattermole's literary production has variable quality due to her collaborations with diverse magazines, whom she wrote for under the pseudonym Contessa Lara. More casual editors often exploited the scandalous aura that followed Cattermole from her love affairs. In particular, she collaborated with the following:

- the newspaper it:Fieramosca, begun in 1881 in Florence
- Nabab by it:Enrico Panzacchi
- it:Pungolo della Domenica
- it:Corriere del Mattino
- it:Fanfulla della domenica
- it:La Tribuna illustrata, in which she had a column called Cronaca femminile
- it:Corriere di Roma by Edoardo Scarfoglio and Matilde Serao
- it:Caffaro in Genoa
- it:Fracassa
- it:Illustrazione italiana by the Fratelli Treves
- it:Margherita

== Literary and poetic fortune ==
The events of her life caused a sensation and roused periodic criticism until right after her tragic death, casting an air of sensationalism and suspicion on her memory and work. This persists in her biographies, that describe her life and works with more or less scandalous tones. The theme of family is often present in her poetry, as a desire and an aspiration for peace. Another recurring theme is the search for love, in part as an expression of sensuality, but more generally directed towards a stable and enduring relationship accompanied with the security of domesticity. Another theme of her poetry is the desire to hide herself far away from the world and to find peace. At times this appears to be a search for destruction and death, but is more often explained as a dream of escape from the city life, to seek refuge in an isolated place.

== Works ==
=== Poetry ===
- Canti e ghirlande, Cellini, Florence, 1867
- Versi, Sommaruga, Rome, 1883
- E ancora versi, Sersale, Firenze, 1886
- Nuovi versi. Edizione postuma, Milan, Galli, 1897
- Senza Baci, with verses by Contessa Lara, music by Francesco Paolo Frontini Forlivesi, 1898

=== Prose ===
- Storie d'amore e di dolore, (collection of novellas)
- Così è, (collection of novellas)
- L'innamorata, (novel)
- Novelle di Natale
- Una famiglia di topi, (for children)
- Il romanzo della bambola, (for children)

=== Editions ===
- Poesie, edited by M. Amendolara, Edizioni dell'Oleandro, Rome, 1998
- Novelle toscane, edited by C. Caporossi, Il Poligrafo, Padua, 2008
- Contessa Lara, Lettere ad Angelo De Gubernatis, edited by C. Caporossi, Otto-Novecento, Milan, 2010
- L'ultima estate di Contessa Lara. Lettere dalla Riviera. 1896, edited by Manola Ida Venzo, with an essay by Biancamaria Frabotta, Viella, Rome 2011
- Il romanzo della bambola, edited by Stefano Calabrese and Federica Fioroni, Nerosubianco, Cuneo, 2011.

== Bibliography ==
- Achille Macchia, Prefazione, in Contessa Lara, Novelle della Contessa Lara, Bideri, Napoli 1914.
- it:Maria Freschi, La Contessa Lara. Una vita di passione e di poesia nell'Ottocento italiano, Milano, Treves, 1930.
- Umberto Bosco, voce «CONTESSA LARA» in Enciclopedia Italiana, Volume 11, Roma, Istituto dell'Enciclopedia Italiana, 1931.
- Benedetto Croce, La Contessa Lara-Annie Vivanti, in it:La letteratura della nuova Italia. Saggi critici, II, Laterza, Bari 1943.
- Brunella Schisa, Dopo ogni abbandono, Garzanti, Milano 2009.
- Alessandra Briganti, CATTERMOLE, Eva Giovanna Antonietta, in Dizionario biografico degli italiani, vol. 22, Roma, Istituto dell'Enciclopedia Italiana, 1979. Modifica su Wikidata
- Luca Steffenoni, I 50 delitti che hanno cambiato l'Italia, Newton Compton, Roma 2016.
- Renzo Castelli, La tragica storia della Contessa Lara. Amori e delitti dall'Ottocento, Edizioni ETS, Pisa 2017
