= Natalino Sapegno =

Italian literary critic

- Born: 10 November 1901; Aosta, Italy
- Died: 11 April 1990 (aged 88); Rome, Italy
- Education: University of Turin
- Occupations: Literary scholar Journalist-commentator; School teacher University professor
- Employer(s): University of Palermo; Sapienza University of Rome
- Spouse(s): 1. Berta Ghedini (who died 1937); 2. Maria Elisabetta Posta
- Children: 2
- Parent(s): Giuseppe Maria Sapegno; Albertine-Louise Viora

Natalino Sapegno (10 November 1901 - 11 April 1990) was a literary critic and Italian academician. He came to prominence as a leading scholar of fourteenth century Italian literature.

== Biography ==
=== Provenance and early years ===
Sapegno was born in Aosta, which was the (overwhelmingly French-speaking) city from where his mother's family came. He spent his first sixteen years growing up in Turin, where his father was employed as a senior official with the government tax office. In 1917, along with his older sister Giuliana, he was entrusted, for a year, to the care of his maternal grandparents in Aosta. Here, for a year, he completed his schooling at the prestigious "liceo classico Principe di Napoli" (secondary school) where the politician-historian Federico Chabod was among his contemporaries.

=== Student years ===
During 1918 he transferred to the University of Turin. He was initially uncertain whether to enrol in the Mathematics Faculty or in the Humanities ("facoltà di lettere") faculty: in the end he opted for the latter. Soon after arriving at the university he had his first encounter with the future anti-fascist journalist Piero Gobetti, in the context of a competition in which they were both involved for a student-bursary from Turin's "Collegio delle province". Sapegno's education initially led him to view the political world through the prism of the influential liberal philosopher-polemicist Benedetto Croce, and he quickly became a friend of Gobetti, and after its launch in 1922, a backer of Gobetti's (as matters turned out short-lived) cultural and political weekly publication, La Rivoluzione liberale.

While he was still at university Sapegno's father died young, in 1919. By the time he died Giuseppe Maria Sapegno had risen to become head of the Turin Tax Office (" segretario capo dell’Intendenza di Finanza di Torino"), and the sudden loss of his salary left the family in financial difficulties. Nevertheless, Natalino Sapegno continued to attend the university. On 10 July 1922 he graduated with a doctorate. His dissertation was supervised by Vittorio Cian and concerned the vernacular work of the Franciscan Umbrian friar Jacopone da Todi. Later he was able, in two successive months, to base two articles published in literary journals on his doctoral work. The text was later revised and published in book form in 1926.

=== Post-graduate years ===
During 1924 Sapegno edited for publication a selection of philosophical pamphlets by Thomas Aquinas as part of a series being produced under the leadership of Giovanni Papini by Rocco Carabba's publishing business. The series title was "Cultura dell’anima" (loosely, "Culture of the spirit"). He also worked for a year during 1923/24 as a replacement teacher at the "Regina Maria Adelaide" teacher training institute in Aosta. It was on the basis of this that in 1924 he won a national competition for the teaching of Italian and History.

=== Ferrara and Berta ===
Towards the end of 1924 he relocated to Ferrara (roughly equidistant between Bologna and Padua) where for some years he taught "literary subjects" - principally Italian and History - in various secondary schools. In addition, between September 1925 and December 1936 he taught at the Vincenzo Monti Technical College. It was while working as a teacher in Emilia-Romagna that he came to know Berta Ghedini, who was also working as a teacher in the city. The two of them married in July 1929. The marriage, which was childless, ended with the early death of Berta in 1937.

=== Switch to the universities sector ===
In 1930 Sapegno obtained a Libera docenza qualification, which under the Italian system permitted him to teach at a university level while not being a full-time member of a university. Between 1932 and 1936 he taught courses in Italian Literature on a free-lance basis at the nearby University of Padua. Between 1930 and 1936 he also at some stage worked on a similar basis at the venerable University of Bologna. Throughout this period he was also building his profile among Italian intellectuals with regular scholarly contributions to specialist journals such as "Archivum Romanicum", "Leonardo", "La Nuova Italia", "Pegaso" and "Civiltà Moderna". His published contributions included a succession of reviews on the works of Montale, Saba, Sbarbaro, Tecchi, Pavolini and Govoni.

In terms of establishing his reputation within the academic community, the volume "Il Trecento" ("The fourteenth century"), written in 1933 and published in 1934, was probably more important than any of those learned literary reviews on the output of contemporary literati, however. The book was published by Valardi in Milan as part of the "Storia letteraria d’Italia" ("History of Italian Literature") series, replacing an earlier volume on the topic which had appeared in 1902. The replacement from Natalino Sapegno was well received by scholars: thanks, in particular, to a favourable review published in 1934 by Giulio Bertoni of the "Société de linguistique romane", won for its author one of the (four) 1934 prizes awarded by the Accademia d’Italia. Despite being among his first books published, it remains probably the best known of his books.

In 1936 he participated in the nationwide competition organised by the University of Messina to fa the vacancy that had arisen at the for an extraordinary professorship in Italian literature. There were no fewer than 29 candidates for evaluation by the ad hoc appointments commission, of whom no fewer than 13 were already well established in their university careers. The appointments commission included Senate President Federzoni, indicating the political importance attaching to the job. Natalino Sapegno was one of three candidates shortlisted for an interview session in Palermo. The upshot of this was that he was offered and accepted the extraordinary professorship, based not at Messina but along the coast at the University of Palermo.

=== Rome ===
As matters turned out, Natalino Sapegno's first full-time university appointment lasted only a year. At the end of 1937 he succeeded Vittorio Rossi, by now in the final months of his illness, with a professorship at the Sapienza University of Rome. The alternative candidate, Luigi Russo, was almost a decade older than Sapegno and came with what was almost certainly a more conventional background in the universities sector. Sapegno's appointment triggered lasting bitterness on Russo's part. However, the university authorities were persuaded to prefer Sapegno, based on a decision communicated from the Education Minister, Giuseppe Bottai. Public government support for the appointment might lead to the assumption that Sapegno might not remain in post after the fall of fascism in 1943, but in fact he continued to teach at the Sapienza till 1976.

During the early years of his long incumbency he taught courses on Poliziano, Dante, Boccaccio, Ariosto and Pulci, thereby cementing his reputation as an authority on the fourteenth and fifteenth century Italian literary dawn. On 16 December 1939 he was promoted to a full professorship ("... nominato ordinario").

=== Maria Elisabetta Posta ===
Natalino Sapegno married Maria Elisabetta Posta, his second wife, in 1938. The marriage was followed by the births of the couple's two daughter, Simonetta and Silvia.

=== War years ===
Between 1938 and 1943 Sapegno had links to the Roman anti-fascist movement, which was well represented among the academics at the Sapienza. Partisan activists to whom he was close included Pietro Ingrao and Carlo Muscetta, along with several of his students, such as Carlo Salinari and Mario Alicata, who became his assistant at some point around 1941. Sources are nevertheless unclear and at times appear contradictory over the extent of his practical commitment to the anti-government cause.

=== Later years ===
In the aftermath of two decades of fascism incorporating half a decade of destructive war, a readjustment of Sapegno's philosophical underpinnings could not be avoided. Many anti-fascist intellectuals of his generation faced some of the same dilemmas. The uncompromisingly idealistic liberal anti-fascist philosophy of Croce would always remain as his starting point; but he also came increasingly under the influence of Gramsci, whereby in his own writings he moved towards a singular fusion of Historicism and Marxism which, in terms of traditional Anglo-American thought patterns, defies easy pigeon-holing.

In 1954 he was elected to the Accademia dei Lincei as a corresponding member. He became a full national member ("Soci nazionali") in 1966. He remained active, frequently in the public eye, almost to the end. His many other memberships took in the Accademia dell'Arcadia, the Rome Philological Society, the European Culture Society and the PEN International. Between 1986 and 1990, along with his other engagements, Sapegno served as president of the Viareggio [literary] Prize.

During the post-war decades Sapegno wrote and published extensively. Sources highlight, in particular, his collaboration with Emilio Cecchi on the "History of Italian Literature" ("Storia della letteratura italiana"), published by Garzanti in nine volumes between 1966 and 1969.

Natalino Sapegno died in Rome on 11 April 1990. His physical remains were removed for burial to Aosta, identified by surviving family members as his home city, however.

== Output (selection) ==
- Frate Jacopone, Torino, Baretti, 1926.
- Il Trecento, Milano, Vallardi, 1934.
- Compendio di Storia della Letteratura Italiana, 3 vol., Firenze, la Nuova Italia, 1936 (vol. 1), 1941 (vol. 2), 1947 (vol. 3).
- Poeti minori del Trecento, Milano-Napoli, Ricciardi, 1952.
- Commento alla Divina Commedia, 3 vol., Firenze, La Nuova Italia, 1955–57.
- Pagine di storia letteraria, Palermo, Manfredi, 1960 (later Firenze, la Nuova Italia, 1986).
- Ritratto di Manzoni ed altri saggi, Bari, Laterza, 1961.
- Storia letteraria del Trecento, Milano-Napoli, Ricciardi, 1963.
- Storia della letteratura italiana (with Emilio Cecchi), 9 vol., Milano, Garzanti, 1965–69.
- Pagine disperse, Roma, Bulzoni, 1979.

== Natalino Sapegno foundation ==
On 3 September 1991 the Regional Government of the Aosta Valley gave its backing to Sapegno's widow and their two daughters for the setting up of the Italian: Centro di studi storico-letterari Natalino Sapegno or French: Centre d'études historico-littéraires Natalino Sapegno (Natalino Sapegno History and Literature Study Centre) in order to honour Sapegno and perpetuate his memory, to be based in the tour de l'Archet, in Morgex.
