= Cattermole =

Cattermole is a surname. Notable people with the surname include:

- Eva Cattermole (1849–1896), Italian writer and poet
- George Cattermole (1800–1868), British painter and illustrator
- Lee Cattermole (born 1988), English footballer
- Paul Cattermole (1977–2023), English singer
