= Frabotta =

Frabotta is an Italian surname. Notable people with the surname include:

- Biancamaria Frabotta (1946–2022), Italian writer
- Gianluca Frabotta (born 1999), Italian footballer
