= Lenola, Lazio =

Lenola
- Comune
- Comune di Lenola
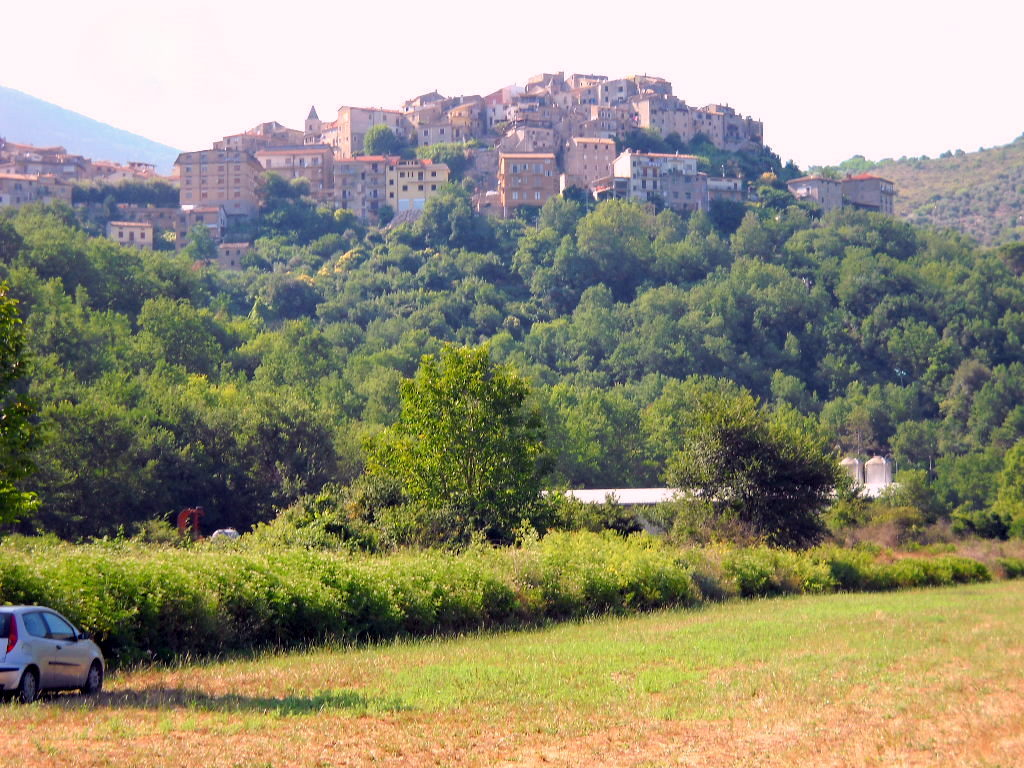
- Panorama of Lenola

- Coat of arms

- Location within Italy Location within Lazio
- Coordinates: 41°25′N 13°28′E
- Country: Italy
- Region: Lazio
- Province: Latina (LT)
- Frazioni: Ambrifi, Camposerianni, Carduso, Liverani, Passignano, Valle Bernardo

Government
  - Mayor: Fernando Magnafico

Area
  - Total: 45.24 km^{2} (17.47 sq mi)
- Elevation: 425 m (1,394 ft)

Population (31 May 2022)
  - Total: 4,045
  - Density: 89.41/km^{2} (231.6/sq mi)
- Demonym: Lenolesi
- Time zone: UTC+1 (CET)
  - Summer (DST): UTC+2 (CEST)
- Postal code: 04025
- Dialing code: 0771
- Patron saint: St. John the Baptist
- Saint day: June 24
- Website: Official website

Lenola is a town and comune in the province of Latina, in the Lazio region of central Italy. Its territory is included in the Natural Preserve of the Monti Aurunci.

== Geography ==
Lenola is located 425 m above the sea level, at the western border of the province of Latina, near the province of Frosinone.

== Climate ==
Lenola's area is characterized by a fresh and dry climate. Typically mild winters, which might include few snowy days, alternate to warm but fresher summers—with respect to surrounding cities on the coastline, making it a perfect location to spend even the hottest days.

== History ==
Known in ancient times as Inola, Inula or Enola, the town was acquired by the Romans in the 4th century BC. It was the site of a clash between the army of Hannibal during his march along the Appian Way towards Rome (c. 217 BC); in a place still called Valle di Annibale ("Hannibal's Valley") remains of armors were found.

After the fall of the Western Roman Empire, Lenola was besieged two times by the Lombards (581 and 595). In 846 it was ravaged by the Saracens. In 1138 it became a possession of the Italo-Norman family of the Dell'Aquila and then, in 1299, to the Caetani family.

During World War II, Lenola suffered several bombings. Some of its inhabitants, such as future President of the Chamber of Deputies, Pietro Ingrao, fought as partisans against the German occupation forces.

== Twin towns ==
- Grotte, Italy
- Mondragon, France
- Marmolejo, Spain
