= L'Orsaminore =

Italian feminist magazine (1981–1983)

- Categories: Feminist magazine
- Frequency: Monthly; Irregular
- Publisher: Alfani
- Founder: Feminist collectives
- Founded: 1981
- First issue: October 1981
- Final issue: March 1983
- Country: Italy
- Based in: Rome
- Language: Italian

L’Orsaminore (Italian: The Little Bear) was a monthly feminist magazine which was in circulation between 1981 and 1983. It was based in Rome, Italy. The subtitle of the magazine was mensile di cultura e politica (Italian: monthly magazine of culture and politics).

== History and profile ==
L’Orsaminore was started by the feminist collectives in Rome in 1981, and its first issue appeared in October that year. The initiative was led by Maria Luisa Boccia, Franca Chiaromonte, Giuseppina Ciuffrida, Licia Conte, Anna Forcella, Biancamaria Frabotta, Manuela Fraire and Rossana Rossanda. Ida Dominijanni and Tamar Pitch also joined the editorial team of the magazine. The stated goal of L’Orsaminore was to offer a public realm for women to help them in overcoming their loneliness. The publisher of the magazine was Alfani. Although it was started as monthly, its frequency later became irregular.

L’Orsaminore had a communist orientation. It argued that men should also participate in the struggle for women's cause. The magazine folded in March 1983.
