= Lucrezia Reichlin =

Italian economist (born 1954)

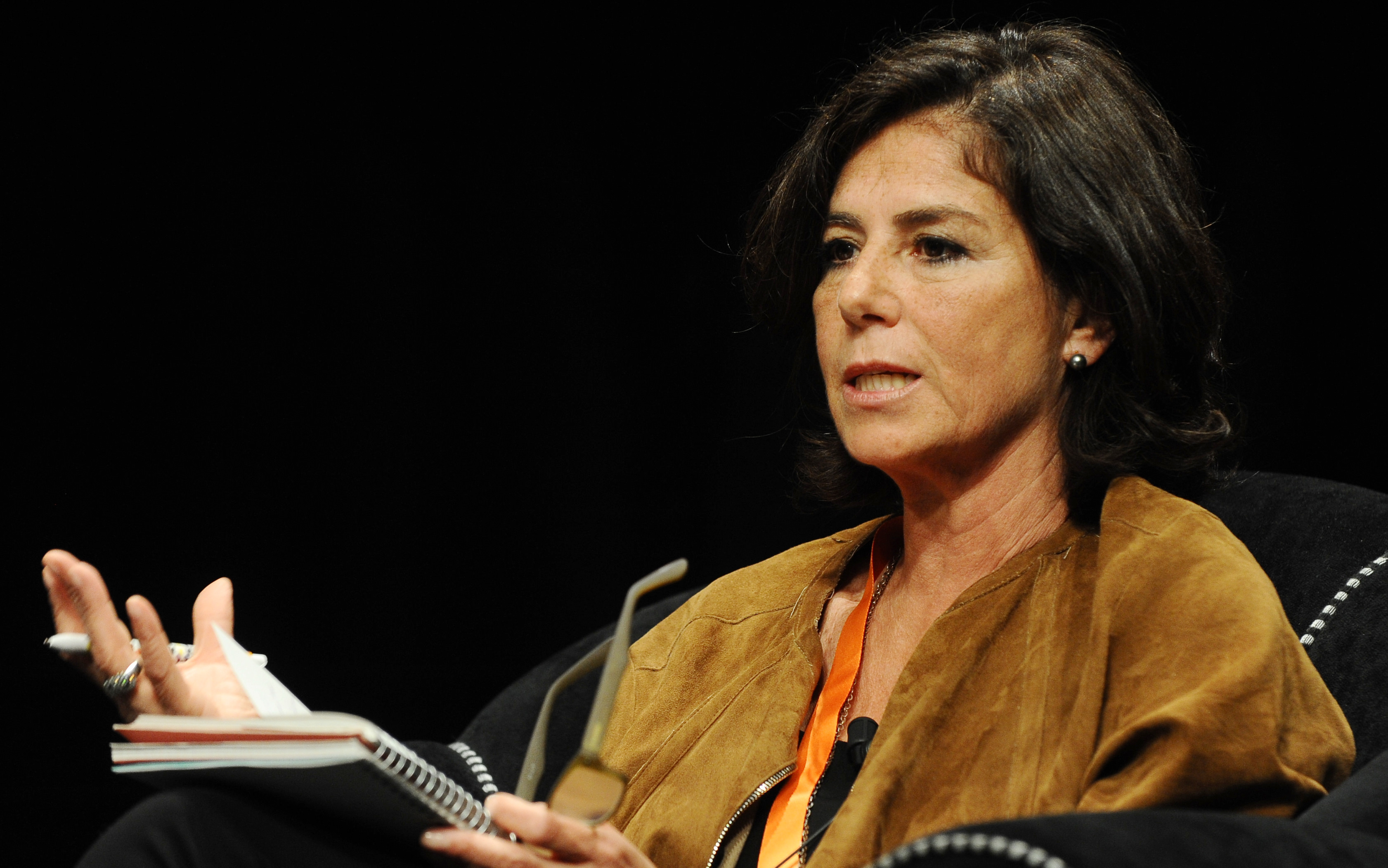
- Lucrezia Reichlin at the Festival of Economics in Trento in 2013.
- Born: 14 August 1954 (age 71); Rome, Italy
- Occupation: Economist
- Parent(s): Alfredo Reichlin (deceased); Luciana Castellina

Lucrezia Reichlin FBA (born 14 August 1954) is an Italian economist who has been a professor at London Business School since 2008. As of early 2025, she was also a non-resident fellow at Bruegel.

Reichlin's research focuses on forecasting, business cycle analysis and monetary policy. She pioneered now-casting in economics by developing econometrics methods capable of reading the real time data flow through the lenses of a formal econometric model. These methods are now widely used by central banks and private investors around the world.

== Early life and education ==
Reichlin was born in 1954, she is the daughter of Alfredo Reichlin, former deputato (member of parliament) for the Italian Communist Party and its heir the Democratic Party of the Left, and of Luciana Castellina, co-founder of the newspaper Il manifesto and also a one-time member of parliament; her brother Pietro Reichlin is a well-known economist.

After completing high school at the Liceo Tasso in Rome, Reichlin graduated in economics at the University of Modena and Reggio Emilia in 1980, and then got a PhD at New York University in 1986.

== Career ==
=== Early beginnings ===
Back in Europe, she worked at the European University Institute in Florence. In 1988 she went to France to the Pariser Fondation Nationale des Sciences Politiques, where she was director of the research department. After working as a visiting professor at Columbia University in the United States from 1993 to 1994, Reichlin worked as a professor of economics at the Université libre de Bruxelles.

=== European Central Bank, 2005–2008 ===
From 2005 to 2008, Reichlin served as Director General of Research at the European Central Bank in Frankfurt, under the leadership of President Jean-Claude Trichet; she was the first woman in that role.

=== Return to academia ===
Since 2008, Reichlin has been professor of economics at London Business School. She has published articles in prestigious international journals, such as the Review of Economic Studies and the Journal of Econometrics. For the National Bureau of Economic Research she edited volumes III (2006) and VI (2009) of the "International Seminar on Macroeconomics" series published by the University of Chicago Press. She is a member of the British Academy, of the Academia Europæa and of the board of the Royal Economic Society

In addition to her academic work, Reichlin holds the role of non-executive director on numerous Boards of Directors including Messaggerie Italiane Group (Milan), Eurobank Ergasias (Athens) and Ageas (Brussels). From 2009 to 2018 she held the position of non-executive director of Unicredit Group. In 2014, Reichlin was mentioned in international news media as a potential candidate to succeed Mark Carney as Governor of the Bank of England or Fabrizio Saccomanni as Minister of Economy and Finance in the government of Prime Minister Matteo Renzi.

Since 2014, Reichlin has been a regular contributor to Project Syndicate.

On 20 September 2018 Reichlin was appointed Deputy-Chairperson of the Board of Directors of Banca Carige, representing the majority shareholder Vittorio Malacalza. She resigned three months later, in December, after the capital increase planned for the bank did not go through the shareholders' meeting due to Malacalza's abstention, which caused the necessary quorum to be lacking.

In early 2021, Reichlin was appointed by the G20 to the High Level Independent Panel (HLIP) on financing the global commons for pandemic preparedness and response, co-chaired by Ngozi Okonjo-Iweala, Tharman Shanmugaratnam and Lawrence Summers.

== Other activities (selection) ==
=== Corporate boards ===
- Ortygia, president and founder
- Ageas, non-executive member of the board of directors
- Eurobank Ergasias, non-executive member of the board of directors
- Banca Carige, non-executive member of the board of directors (2018)
- UniCredit, member of the board of directors (2009–2018)

=== Non-profit organizations ===
- Barcelona School of Economics, member of the scientific council (since 2022)
- European Corporate Governance Institute (ECGI), chair of the board of directors (since 2020)
- IFRS Foundation, member of the board of trustees
- Centre for Economic Policy Research (CEPR), member of the board of trustees
- Center for Applied Financial Economics (CAFE), University of Southern California, member of the advisory board
- Center for Social Norms and Behavioral Dynamics, University of Pennsylvania, member of the advisory board
- Center for Economic Research and Graduate Education – Economics Institute (CERGE-EI), member of the board of trustees
- Centre de Recerca en Economia Internacional (CREI), Pompeu Fabra University (UPF), member of the advisory board
- Fondazione Italiana Accenture, member of the advisory board
- Bruegel, chair of the scientific council (2013–2016)

== Recognition ==
- 2013 – Fellow of the British Academy (FBA)
- 2016 – Birgit Grodal Award
- 2021 – Serena Medal, British Academy
