= Silvano Miniati =

Italian politician and trade union organizer

Silvano Miniati (18 June 1934 in Scarperia, Italy – 7 November 2016 in Florence), was an Italian politician and trade union organizer.

== Biography ==
Miniati began political activity in 1950, with enrollment in the Socialist youth movement and the CGIL (Italian General Confederation of Labour), while working as an apprentice metalworker. In 1956, he was elected municipal councilor of San Piero a Sieve in Florence. In 1957, he was elected to the provincial secretary of the FIOM (Federazione Impiegati Operai Metallurgici) of Florence. After the establishment of PSIUP (Italian Socialist Party of Proletarian Unity), he left his trade union activities in 1965 to completely devote himself to the new party. In 1964, he was elected councilor of the province of Florence. In PSIUP, he was Secretary of the Federation of Florence and Tuscany Regional Secretary and member of the national executive, representing the left component. In 1972, at the time of the dissolution of PSIUP, he participated with the party's left component to the establishment of the Proletarian Unity Party, where he became a national leader. He then promoted the formation of the Party of Proletarian Unity and unification with the Manifesto group leading to the establishment of the Proletarian Unity Party for Communism, assuming roles of national leadership. He then participated in proletarian democracy. With the crisis of the far-left movements, he took up the trade union activities in the ILO and, in 1985, was elected General Secretary of the retired UIL. In the Congress of San Remo in 1989, he was elected General Secretary of UILP, a position held until the end of 2007. He was Vice President of the Fondazione Bruno Buozzi. He was an adviser of CNEL (National Economic and Labour Council).
