= Mario Alicata =

Italian politician (1918–1966)

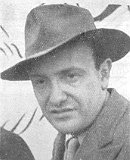

Member of the Chamber of Deputies
- In office 8 May 1949 – 6 December 1966

Personal details
- Born: 8 May 1918 Reggio Calabria, Italy
- Died: 6 December 1966 (aged 48) Rome, Italy
- Party: PCI
- Occupation: Journalist and literary critic
- Website: Chamber of Deputies' Records

Mario Alicata (8 May 1918 – 6 December 1966) was an Italian Partisan, literary critic and politician.

== Biography ==
=== Early life ===
Son of the Sicilians Antonino Alicata and Luigina Fazio-Allmayer, he was born at Reggio Calabria, where his father was head of the civil engineers. From 1925 he studied at Palermo and then from 1933 in the Liceo classico Torquato Tasso in Rome, where his family had relocated after his father was appointed Inspector of the Ministry of Public Works. With Bruno Zevi, Paolo Alatri, Carlo Cassola and other schoolmates, he founded the Circolo giovanile di cultura moderna (Youth Group for Modern Culture). In 1936 he enrolled in the Faculty of literature at the Sapienza University of Rome, becoming part of the Gruppo universitario fascista and participating in the student competitions (Littoriali della cultura e dell'arte) organised by fascist students' organisation at Naples in 1937 and at Palermo in 1938, where he came eighth.

=== Partisan activity ===
During these years, Alicata came into contact with many young antifascist students, such as Pietro Ingrao, Carlo Salinari, Mario Socrate, Carlo Muscetta, Aldo Natoli, Lucio Lombardo Radice, Paolo Alatri and Paolo Bufalini. He also collaborated with the Roman newspaper Il Piccolo, Giuseppe Bottai's journal Primato, the literary weeklies Il Meridiano di Roma and La Ruota. He secretly enrolled in the Italian Communist Party in 1940, the year in which he graduated with his these Vincenzo Gravina e l'estetica del primo Settecento (Vincenzo Gravina and the Aesthetic of the early Eighteenth century). He then became the assistant of Natalino Sapegno, who had been his supervisor.

In 1941 he became an editor in the Roman office of the publishing house Einaudi with Giaime Pintor and Carlo Muscetta. There he dramatised several stories of Giovanni Verga for the cinema and worked for Luchino Visconti on the film Ossessione (based on James M. Cain's The Postman Always Rings Twice), which was destroyed in 1943 by the Fascist authorities amid controversy.

He married Giuliana Spaini in December 1941. He was arrested the next year and was freed with the fall of Fascism. He participated in the resistance against the German occupiers in Roma, running Il Lavoro italiano the united journal of the labour unions with the Christian democrat Alberto Canaletti Gaudenti and the socialist Olindo Vernocchi. He was secretly among the editors of l'Unità, directed by Celeste Negarville.

=== Political and literary career ===
Immediately after the liberation of Rome, he became part of the government of the Comune of Rome. From 1945 to 1948 he directed the Neapolitan newspaper La Voce, in 1946 he was elected as a local councillor for Naples, in 1949 he directed the communist weekly La Voce del Mezzogiorno with Giorgio Amendola. In the election of 18 April 1948 he was elected to the Chamber of Deputies from the district of Napoli-Caserta. Thereafter he was named Regional Secretary of the Communist party in Calabria and became a member of the central committee of the Italian Communist Party.

In 1950 he became part of the secretariat of the national committee for the revival of Southern Italy, which set up an investigation of the conditions of the southern people, published in La Voce del Mezzogiorno. He was spokesman for the minority in the Parliamentary commission which discussed the results of the investigation. Re-elected as a Deputy in 1953 and 1958, for the district of Catanzaro-Cosenza-Reggio Calabria, he was also Mayor of Melissa, Calabria from 1953.

Against Elio Vittorini he claimed he was convinced the arts ought to help "men in the fight for justice and liberty," in a polemic continued by Palmiro Togliatti on the theme of the relationship between politics and culture. Against Carlo Levi and Rocco Scotellaro, Alicata maintained that the revival of the southern farmers could be obtained through "the alliance and the direction of the working class" which would fight against "the traditional enemies of the South: the agro-industrial bloc, Italian and foreign imperialism."

From 1954 to 1964 he directed the journal, Cronache meridionali with Giorgio Amendola, Francesco De Martino, Gerardo Chiaromonte, Giorgio Napolitano, Rosario Villari and others. He directed the Cultural Commission of the Italian Communist Party from 1955, was a member of the Party directorate from 1956 and was director of L'Unità from 1962. He signed the editorial of the first issue of the theoretical journal Critica marxista in February 1963, the same year in which he was reelected as Deputy from the district of Siena. From 1964 he was a member of the Secretariat of the Communist Party.

In August 1966, he denounced the damage done to Agrigento by real estate speculation and in his final speech in the chamber he accused the managerial class of being incapable of protecting Italy's artistic patrimony. He died suddenly at Rome on 6 December 1966, aged forty-eight.

== Works ==
- La riforma della scuola. Roma: Editori Riuniti. 1956.
- La lezione di Agrigento. prefazione di Emanuele Macaluso. Roma: Editori Riuniti. 1966.
- La battaglia delle idee. prefazione di Luciano Gruppi. Roma: Editori riuniti. 1968.
- Scritti letterari. introduzione di Natalino Sapegno. Milano: Il saggiatore. 1968.
- Intellettuali e azione politica. a cura di Renzo Martinelli e Roberto Maini. Roma: Editori riuniti. 1976.
- Lettere e taccuini di Regina Coeli. prefazione di Giorgio Amendola ; introduzione di Albertina Vittoria. Torino: Einaudi. 1977.

== Bibliography ==
- Albertina Vittoria, Alicata, Mario, «DBI», XXXIV, Roma, Istituto dell'Enciclopedia italiana, 1988

Preceded by Alfredo Reichlin	Director of l'Unità; 1962 - 1966	Succeeded by Maurizio Ferrara
