= Workers' Political Movement =

Italian political party

Workers' Political Movement Movimento Politico dei Lavoratori
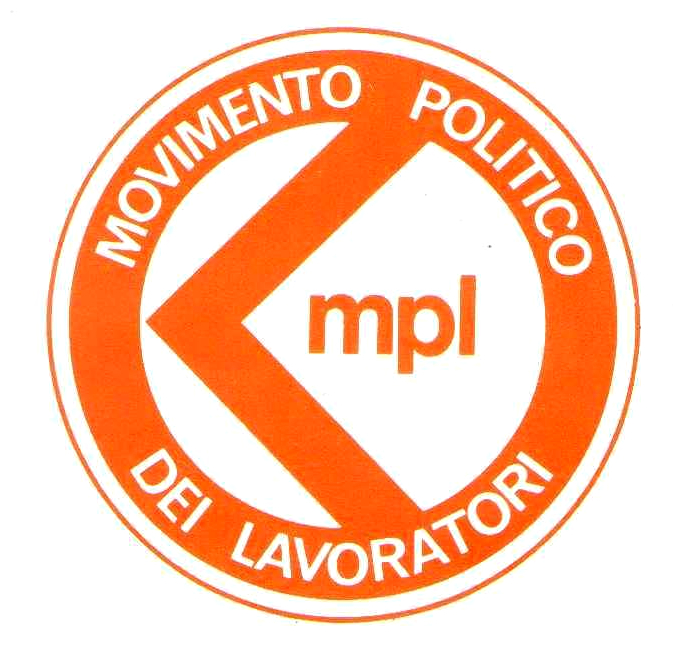
- Leader: Livio Labor
- Founded: 1971
- Dissolved: 1972
- Ideology: Christian left Christian socialism
- Political position: Left-wing

The Workers' Political Movement (Italian: Movimento Politico dei Lavoratori, MPL), also translated as Political Movement of Workers, was a small political party in Italy led by Livio Labor.

== History ==
After the congress of Christian Associations of Italian Workers (ACLI) had voted to end its affiliation with Christian Democracy, on March 8, 1969, Livio Labor (president of ACLI) and Riccardo Lombardi founded the "Association of Political Culture" (Associazione di Cultura Politica, ACPOL), committed to the restructuring of the Italian left. On 5 July 1970, the ACPOL dissolved itself to start the constituent phase of the Workers' Political Movement (MPL). The MPL sprang from the Catholic sector of dissent towards the Christian Democrats, aiming to represent progressive Catholics and leftists.

In the general elections of 1972 the MPL obtained only 0.36% of the votes. After this disappointing result many MPL members (such as Labor himself, Gennaro Acquaviva, Luciano Benadusi, Marco Biagi and Luigi Covatta) joined the Italian Socialist Party (PSI).

The MPL minority (Giovanni Russo Spena, Domenico Jervolino, Gian Giacomo Migone, Vittorio Bellavite and others) decided instead to continue its political activity as Socialist Alternative. Three months later this new formation merged with the New Italian Socialist Party of Proletarian Unity (PSIUP) to found the Proletarian Unity Party (PdUP).
