= Francesca Marinaro =

Italian politician

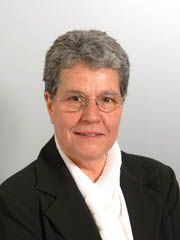

Member of the European Parliament
- In office 24 July 1984 – 24 July 1989
- Constituency: Italy

Personal details
- Born: 26 November 1952 (age 73) Villarosa, Enna, Sicily Italy
- Party: Italian Communist Party
- Occupation: Politician

Francesca Marinaro is an Italian politician. From 1984 to 1989 she served as a Member of the European Parliament, representing Italy for the Communist Party.
