= Pietro Ingrao =

Italian politician and journalist (1915–2015)

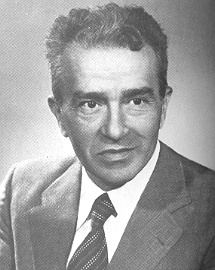

President of the Chamber of Deputies
- In office 5 July 1976 – 19 June 1979
- Preceded by: Sandro Pertini
- Succeeded by: Nilde Iotti

Member of the Chamber of Deputies
- In office 27 September 1950 – 22 April 1992
- Constituency: Rome (1950–1963; 1976–1983); Perugia (1963–1972; 1983–1992); Bologna (1972–1976)

Personal details
- Born: 30 March 1915 Lenola, Italy
- Died: 27 September 2015 (aged 100) Rome, Italy
- Party: PCI (until 1991); PDS (1991–1993); PRC (2005–2009); SEL (2009–2015)
- Spouse: Laura Lombardo Radice
- Children: 5 (Chiara, Renata, Bruna, Celeste, Guido)
- Education: Sapienza University of Rome
- Profession: Politician

Pietro Ingrao (30 March 1915 – 27 September 2015) was an Italian politician and journalist who participated in the Italian resistance movement. For many years, he was a senior figure in the Italian Communist Party (PCI).

== Biography ==
Ingrao was born at Lenola, Lazio, in the province of Latina. As a student, he was a member of GUF (Gruppo Universitario Fascista) and won a "Littoriale" for culture and art. Ingrao joined the PCI in 1940 and took part in the anti-fascist resistance during World War II. After the war, he was an important representative of the left-wing, more explicitly Marxist–Leninist tendency in the party. This led him to frequently express his political differences with Giorgio Amendola, leader of the tendency that was more orientated towards social democracy.

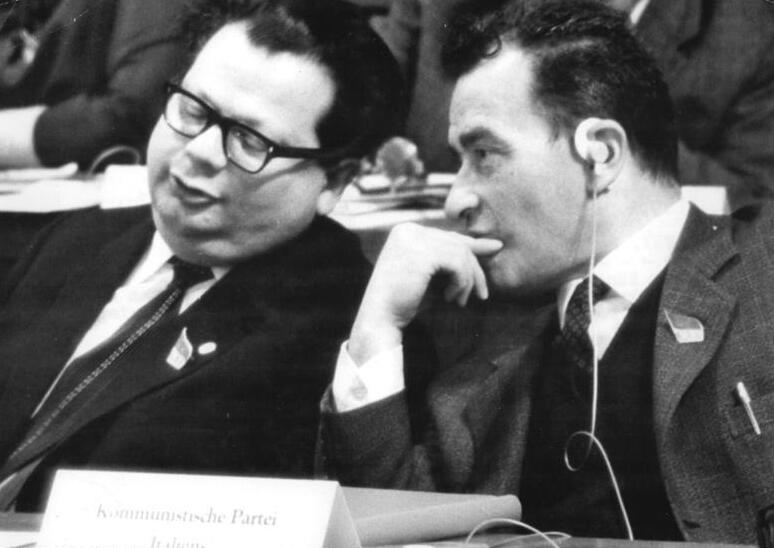
Ingrao (right) and East German International Relations Secretary Hermann Axen (left) at the 7th Party Congress of the Socialist Unity Party in East Berlin, 18 April 1967

Ingrao was a member of the Italian Parliament continuously from 1950 to 1992. From 1947 to 1957, he was editor-in-chief of the party newspaper L'Unità. The tensions between Ingrao's and Amendola's vision became sharper throughout the first half of the 1960s. According to Lucio Magri, Ingrao was portrayed by his detractors as a utopian dreamer who refused any temporary compromise with the center-left, but incorrectly so. In fact, Ingrao acknowledged the value of reforms on the "road to socialism", but he found the vision of Amendola and Longo to be devoid of a long-term strategic plan. Magri adds that Ingrao's dissent was important "because it meant that a 'non-dogmatic, non-Stalinist' Left was present for the first time within a Communist party".

During the Eleventh Party Congress (1966), Ingrao openly criticized Longo's refusal to allow public debate, which made him popular with a part of the participants. However, it also led to the party leadership demonizing him as a factionalist; Ingrao later recalled that the leading cadres retained a cold posture in their seats and declined to shake his hand afterwards. Mario Alicata denounced Ingrao's statements as harmful to party unity. Magri clarifies that Ingrao's aim was not to challenge democratic centralism (Ingrao himself later voted for the expulsion of the faction around il manifesto), but to return to democratic centralism as it was originally conceived by Lenin. This vision entailed a more transparent process of argument and a party democracy that was not limited only to occasional congresses.

Ingrao was the first Communist to become president of the Italian Chamber of Deputies, a position he held from 1976 to 1979. After PCI's then-secretary Achille Occhetto, in what was called the Svolta della Bolognina, decided to change the party's name, Ingrao became his main internal opponent. In the PCI's 20th Congress of 1991, he opposed the dissolution of the Communist Party proposed by Occhetto (with the support of Massimo D'Alema, Walter Veltroni, and Piero Fassino) and presented the so-called NO motion. Despite losing the congress, Ingrao remained for a certain period in the new Democratic Party of the Left (PDS)at the head of the internal left wing, which included, among others: Luciana Castellina, Fausto Bertinotti, Chiara Ingrao, Gloria Buffo, Giacomo Princigalli, Alba Sasso, Pietro Folena, Giorgio Mele and Vincenzo Vita. After the 2004 European Parliament election in Italy, he abandoned the PDS and adhered as an independent to the more hardline successor to the old PCI, the Communist Refoundation Party.

Ingrao wrote a number of poems and political essays. His most important work is Appuntamenti di fine secolo ("Rendez-Vous at the End of the Century"), which was published in 1995 in collaboration with Rossana Rossanda. He was an atheist. He married Laura Lombardo Radice, who died in 2003. Ingrao died on 27 September 2015, at the age of 100.

== Electoral history ==
Election	House	Constituency	Party	Votes	Result
1948	Chamber of Deputies	Rome–Viterbo–Latina–Frosinone	PCI	26,801	Not elected
1953	Chamber of Deputies	Rome–Viterbo–Latina–Frosinone	PCI	20,457	Elected
1958	Chamber of Deputies	Rome–Viterbo–Latina–Frosinone	PCI	33,820	Elected
1963	Chamber of Deputies	Perugia–Terni–Rieti	PCI	48,423	Elected
1968	Chamber of Deputies	Perugia–Terni–Rieti	PCI	42,441	Elected
1972	Chamber of Deputies	Bologna–Ferrara–Ravenna–Forlì	PCI	48,718	Elected
1976	Chamber of Deputies	Rome–Viterbo–Latina–Frosinone	PCI	62,623	Elected
1979	Chamber of Deputies	Rome–Viterbo–Latina–Frosinone	PCI	53,369	Elected
1983	Chamber of Deputies	Perugia–Terni–Rieti	PCI	57,148	Elected
1987	Chamber of Deputies	Perugia–Terni–Rieti	PCI	57,220	Elected

== Sources ==
- Galdo, Antonio (2004). Pietro Ingrao. Il compagno disarmato. Milan: Sperling & Kupfer. ISBN 88-200-3732-7.

Political offices
Preceded by Alessandro Pertini	President of the Italian Chamber of Deputies; 1976–1979	Succeeded by Nilde Iotti
