= Luigi Covatta =

Italian politician (1943–2021)

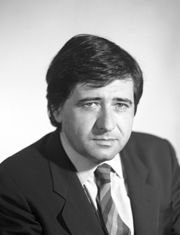

Member of the Italian Chamber of Deputies
- In office 20 June 1979 – 11 July 1983
- Parliamentary group: Pentapartito
- Constituency: Emilia-Romagna

Member of the Italian Senate
- In office 12 July 1983 – 14 April 1994
- Parliamentary group: Pentapartito

Personal details
- Born: 15 May 1943 Forio, Kingdom of Italy
- Died: 18 April 2021 (aged 77) Rome, Italy
- Party: MPL (1969–72); PSI (from 1972)

Luigi Covatta (15 May 1943 – 18 April 2021) was an Italian politician and journalist. A member of the Italian Socialist Party, he served in the Chamber of Deputies from 1979 to 1983 and the Senate of the Republic from 1983 to 1994.

== Biography ==
As a student, Covatta worked for Intesa. In the 1972 Italian general election, he supported Livio Labor of the Workers' Political Movement (MPL). After a disappointing performance for the party, he joined the Italian Socialist Party (PSI). From 1979 to 1994, he served in the Italian Parliament, first in the Chamber of Deputies and subsequently in the Senate. In the 1994 Italian general election, he ran in the Pact for Italy alliance but was defeated and retired from politics.

Covatta also pursued a career in journalism, becoming political director for Mondoperaio in 2009. He also contributed to La Repubblica, Il Mattino, Avanti!, Corriere della Sera, Il Riformista, and others.

Luigi Covatta died in Rome on 18 April 2021 at the age of 77.

== Works ==
- Menscevichi. I riformisti nella storia dell'Italia repubblicana (2005)
- Diario della Repubblica (2006)
- La legge di Tocqueville. Come nacque e come morì la riforma della prima Repubblica italiana (2007)
