= Alfredo Reichlin =

Italian journalist and politician (1925–2017)

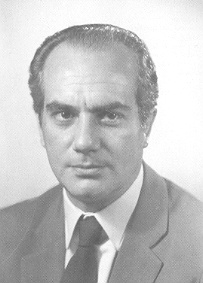
- Alfredo Reichlin in 1983.

Member of the Chamber of Deputies
- In office 5 June 1968 – 14 April 1994
- Constituency: Lecce (1968–1983); Bari (1983–1994)

Personal details
- Born: 26 May 1925 Barletta, Italy
- Died: 21 March 2017 (aged 91) Rome, Italy
- Party: PCI (1946–1991); PDS (1991–1998); DS (1998–2007); PD (2007–2017)
- Spouse: Luciana Castellina (m. 1953; div. 1958)
- Children: 2
- Occupation: Journalist, politician

Alfredo Reichlin (26 May 1925 – 21 March 2017) was an Italian journalist and politician.

== Biography ==
When he was very young, Reichlin took part in the Italian Resistance with the Garibaldi Brigades, as a member of the Patriotic Action Groups; captured by the fascists, Reichlin was providentially freed and saved.

In 1946, Reichlin joined the Italian Communist Party of which he has been one of the most important leaders. A pupil of Palmiro Togliatti, Reichlin has been vice-secretary of the Italian Communist Youth Federation and in 1958 he became editor-in-chief of L'Unità. In the 1960s he approached the positions of Pietro Ingrao, leader of the left-wing current of the party.

Elected to the Chamber of Deputies from 1968 to 1994, during the 1970s Reichlin entered the National Leadership of the party and worked side by side with Enrico Berlinguer and became once again editor-in-chief of L'Unità from 1977 to 1981.

In 1989, Reichlin became Minister of Economy of the Shadow Cabinet of the Italian Communist Party. He has later been in favor of the party's transformation from PCI to the Democratic Party.

=== Personal life ===
Reichlin has been married to journalist and politician Luciana Castellina: they had two children, Lucrezia and Pietro, both of them economists.

He died in Rome on 21 March 2017, at the age of 91.

== Electoral history ==
Election	House	Constituency	Party	Votes	Result
1968	Chamber of Deputies	Lecce–Brindisi–Taranto	PCI	90,120	Elected
1972	Chamber of Deputies	Lecce–Brindisi–Taranto	PCI	88,901	Elected
1976	Chamber of Deputies	Lecce–Brindisi–Taranto	PCI	127,937	Elected
1979	Chamber of Deputies	Lecce–Brindisi–Taranto	PCI	115,271	Elected
1983	Chamber of Deputies	Bari–Foggia	PCI	116,041	Elected
1987	Chamber of Deputies	Bari–Foggia	PCI	107,080	Elected
1992	Chamber of Deputies	Bari–Foggia	PDS	12,539	Elected
