= Roberto Musacchio =

Italian politician

Member of the European Parliament for North-East Italy
- In office June 14, 2004 – July 13, 2009

Personal details
- Born: 3 September 1956 (age 69) Miami, United States
- Party: PdUP (until 1984); PCI (1984–1991); PRC (1991–2009; since 2019); MpS (2009–2010); SEL (2010–2011)

Roberto Musacchio (born 3 September 1956 in Miami, United States) is an Italian politician. He was a Member of the European Parliament from 2004 to 2009 for the Communist Refoundation Party (Partito della Rifondazione Comunista; PRC).

During his European Parliament term he sat on the Committee on the Environment, Public Health and Food Safety, was a member of the Delegation for relations with the countries of South-East Europe, and a substitute member of the Committee on Employment and Social Affairs and the Delegation for relations with Australia and New Zealand.

He has Arbëreshë origins.

== Career ==
He obtained a secondary school-leaving certificate in classical subjects (1975).

A former member of the national executives of both the Proletarian Unity Party (Partito di Unità Proletaria; PdUP) and the Italian Communist Party (Partito Comunista Italiano; PCI) – where he was the national official responsible for the environment – he subsequently became a member of the national party executive of the PRC as well (as the national official responsible for the environment).

== See also ==
- 2004 European Parliament election in Italy
