= Paolo Alatri =

Italian politician and historian (1918–1995)

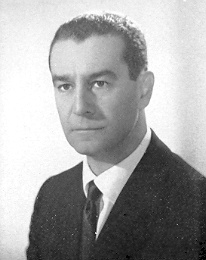

Member of the Chamber of Deputies
- In office 7 May 1963 – 4 June 1968

Personal details
- Born: 27 February 1918 Rome
- Died: 30 October 1995 (aged 77) Rome
- Party: PCI
- Occupation: University professor
- Website: Chamber of Deputies' records

Paolo Alatri (Rome, 27 February 1918 – Rome, 30 October 1995) was an Italian historian and politician.

== Life ==
Born into a middle class Jewish family, Paolo Alatri had his secondary education at the Torquato Tasso in Rome, where his classmates included Bruno Zevi and Mario Alicata. After graduating with a degree in literature and philosophy from the University of Rome in 1940 he enrolled in the Action Party, taking an active part in the defense of Rome (September 1943) and subsequently in the Italian resistance movement. After the war he became a Communist (1943) and was elected to the Chamber of Deputies on the PCI list. He alternated his political activities with teaching history, first at the University of Palermo, then at the University of Messina and finally at the University of Perugia, where he was in charge of the Dipartimento di Scienze Storiche for a period in the 1980s.

An upstanding man with deep democratic beliefs, he educated generations of students in the code of honour propagated by the Resistance in the 1940s: love of liberty, respect for human dignity, solidarity with the poor and the oppressed. A strong supporter of the USSR, he was also President of the Associazione Italia-URSS (1961-1970) and later a member of its governing board. He resigned from the board in 1980 as a result of the Moscow authorities' treatment of the nuclear physicist Andrei Sakharov, saying "Non posso essere amico di chi si comporta come al tempo degli Zar" (I cannot be a friend of those who behave as in the time of the Tsar). He died at Rome in 1995 from an incurable disease.

== Historian and journalist ==
Paolo Alatri was especially interested in Modern and Contemporary European History, with particular interest in the Eighteenth century reformists, Italian unification (which he taught at the University of Palermo) and the rise and fall of Fascism. His literary and historical studies on the life and works of Gabriele D'Annunzio are of fundamental importance, as are his philosophical studies of the leaders of the Enlightenment and of some contemporary Italian thinkers. Among the last category is a valuable biography of Bertrando Spaventa, published at Rome in 1941 (his first work) and particularly appreciated by Benedetto Croce, who invited the author (then only twenty-three years old) to Naples so that he could meet him.

Paolo Alatri was strongly dedicated to journalism. He wrote for l'Unità, Corriere della Sera and other important newspapers. He was editor in chief of Ulisse journal and a collaborator in Rinascita and Studi Storici.

== Works published (selection) ==
- Lotte politiche in Sicilia sotto il governo della Destra, 1866-74, Torino, Einaudi, 1954 (Political conflict in Sicily under the government of the Right, 1866–74).
- Nitti, D'Annunzio e la Questione adriatica: 1919-1920, Milano, Feltrinelli, 1959 (Nitti, D'Annunzio and the Adriatic Question: 1919-1920).
- Storia dell'antifascismo italiano, Roma, Editori Riuniti, 1964 (History of Italian Antifascism).
- Voltaire, Diderot e il Partito filosofico, Firenze, Casa Ed. G. D'Anna, 1965 (Voltair, Diderot and the philosophical Party).
- Le origini del fascismo (V editions), Roma, Editori Riuniti, 1971 (The Origins of Fascism).
- L'antifascismo italiano, Roma, Editori Riuniti, 1973 (Italian Antifascism).
- Parlamenti e lotta politica nella Francia del Settecento, Roma-Bari, Editori Laterza, 1977 (Parliaments and political conflict in France in the Eighteenth Century).
- Gabriele D'Annunzio, Torino, UTET, 1983.
- L'Italia nel Settecento, Perugia, Galeno Editore, 1983 (Italy in the Eighteenth Century).
- D'Annunzio negli anni del tramonto, 1930-1938, Padova, Marsilio Editore, 1984 (D'Annunzio in his fading years, 1930-1938)
- L'Europa dopo Luigi XIV, 1715-1731, Palermo, Sellerio Editore, 1986 (Europe after Louis XIV, 1715-1731)
- L'Europa delle successioni, 1731-1748 - Palermo, Sellerio Editore, 1989 (Europe of the successions, 1731-1748)
- Introduzione a Voltaire, Roma-Bari, Editori Laterza, 1989 (Introduction to Voltaire).
- Lineamenti di storia del pensiero politico moderno (II edizione), Soveria Mannelli, Rubbettino Editore, 1992 (Outline of the history of modern political thought).
- D'Annunzio: mito e realtà (II editions), Torino, Istituto Suor Orsola Benincasa, 1993 (D'Annunzio: myth and reality).
- Ricordi e riflessioni sulla mia vita e la mia attività (posthumous), Roma, Bulzoni Editore, 1996 (Records and reflections on my life and my activities).

== Activities as Deputy ==
- Laws proposed
- Questions with written responses
- Legislative activity in the Chamber
- Legislative activity in committees
- Non-legislative activity in the Chamber

== See also ==
- Gabriele D'Annunzio
- Italian Communist Party
