= Chiara Ingrao =

Italian politician (born 1949)

Chiara Ingrao (born 25 April 1949) is an Italian politician.

Chiara Ingrao was the daughter of Pietro Ingrao and his wife Laura Lombardo Radice. She was born in Rome on 25 April 1949. Ingrao was a translator, and has written about her experience in a metalworking union. She was elected to the Chamber of Deputies as a member of the Democratic Party of the Left, and sat on the Legislature XI, which met between 1992 and 1994. Ingrao later served as an adviser to the Italian Minister for Equal Opportunities.
