= Eugenia Levi =

Italian author, translator, and journalist

- Born: 21 November 1861; Padua, Kingdom of Lombardy–Venetia
- Died: 1915 (aged 53–54)
- Occupations: Author, translator, journalist
- Writing career
- Language: Italian

Eugenia Levi (21 November 1861 – 1915) was an Italian writer, translator, and journalist. Born to a Jewish family in Padua, she was educated in that city, as well as in Florence and Hanover. In 1885 she was appointed professor at the R. Istituto superiore femminile di Magistero in Florence.

== Publications ==
- Ricorditi! Pensieri ed affetti [Remember: Thoughts and Affections]. Florence: Le Monnier. 1888. (5th ed. 1899). Anthology of Italian prosaists and poets from Dante Alighieri to Giosuè Carducci.
- Dai nostri poeti viventi [From our Living Poets]. Florence: Loescher & Seeber. 1891. hdl:2027/coo.31924027460777. (3rd ed. 1903).
- Dai giornale di Lia [From Lia's journal]. Rome. 1892.
- Rammentiamocci [Let Us Remember]. Florence: Le Monnier. 1893.
- Dante ... di giorno in giorno [Dante ... From Day to Day]. Florence: Loescher & Seeber. 1894. hdl:2027/hvd.32044085935138. (3rd ed. 1898). A collection of quotations from Dante.
- Levi, Eugenia (1894). Pensieri d'amore [Thoughts of Love]. Florence. (3rd ed. 1900).
- Fiorita di canti tradizionali del popolo italiano [Traditional Songs of the Italian People]. Florence: R. Bemporad & figlio. 1895. hdl:2027/hvd.hx8drr. Anthology of traditional Italian songs.
- Deutsch. Tradizioni, storia, cultura, paese e costumi dei tedeschi [German: Traditions, History, Culture, Country and Costume of the Germans]. Florence: Bemporad & figlio. 1899. Grammar of the German language with a translation of standard German works.
- Lirica italiana antica [Early Italian Opera]. Florence: Leo S. Olschki. 1904.
- Per i vostri bambini. Poesie figure, melodie [For Your Children]. Rome: Casa Editrice Nazionale. 1906.
- Lirica italiana nel cinquecento e nel seicento fino all'Arcadia [Italian Opera in the Sixteenth and Seventeenth Centuries, Up to Arcadia]. Florence: Leo S. Olschki. 1909.
