= Biancamaria Frabotta =

Italian writer (1946–2022)

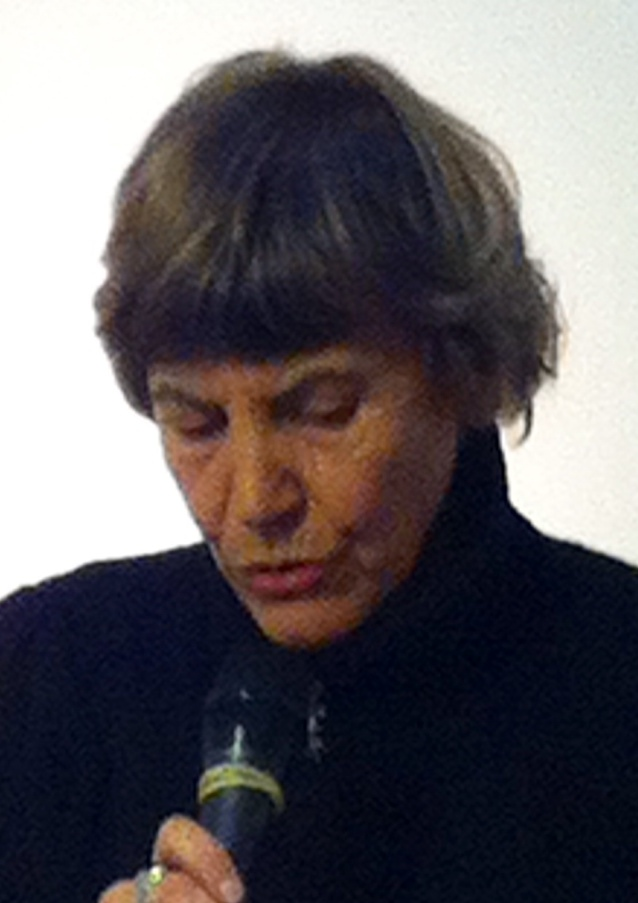
- Frabotta in 2012
- Born: Bianca Maria Frabotta; 11 June 1946; Rome, Italy
- Died: 2 May 2022 (aged 75); Rome, Italy
- Education: University of Rome La Sapienza, Rome
- Occupations: Poet, academic, novelist, playwright
- Writing career
- Language: Italian
- Period: 1976–2022
- Notable works: Il rumore bianco La viandanza La pianta del pane Da mani mortali
- Notable awards: Premio Dessì Prize; 2003 La pianta del pane
- Movements: Anti-fascism, feminism

Biancamaria Frabotta (11 June 1946 – 2 May 2022) was an Italian writer. She promoted the study of women writers in Italy and her early poetry focused on feminist issues. The main themes of her later works are melancholy, the dichotomy between Nature and History and between Action and Contemplation, the relationship between the body and the self, and conjugal love. Besides essays on feminism and academic works on poets such as Giorgio Caproni, Franco Fortini, and Amelia Rosselli, she wrote plays, radio-dramas, a television show on Petrarch, and a novel. Until her retirement in 2016, she taught Modern Italian Literature at the University of Rome La Sapienza, where she previously received her Laurea degree.

== Life and career ==
=== Early life ===
Frabotta was born in Rome, in the same month of the proclamation of the republic in Italy. As a child, she grew up in the capital, with frequent sojourns in the port-city of Civitavecchia which would later appear in her poetry. After graduating at the Liceo Classico, she started studying literature at the University of Rome La Sapienza. Her Laurea dissertation analyzed the writings of Carlo Cattaneo and won the Carlo Cattaneo prize of the Fondazione Ticino Nostro in Switzerland. In Rome, Frabotta also studied modern poetry (especially Eugenio Montale's work) with Walter Binni.

As a university student, she took part in the protests of the 1968, emerging as a prominent figure in the students' movement and showing a specific engagement (both as a writer and as an activist) for women's issues and gender theory. During the late Sixties and the Seventies, she developed strong personal and intellectual connections with artists and writers based in Rome such as Alberto Moravia, Dacia Maraini, Amelia Rosselli, and Dario Bellezza.

=== Academic and literary career ===
A contributor and cultural journalist for many Italian newspapers and journals over the years (Poesia, Alfabeta, Il Manifesto, L’Orsaminore), Frabotta was also an academic critic and a professor at the University of Rome La Sapienza, where she mainly taught contemporary Italian poetry.

Her main poetic publications are usually preceded by thematic plaquettes that, combined and made interacting with each other, eventually form the body of her books. After publishing her first major book, Il Rumore Bianco, with Feltrinelli in 1982, she started an editorial collaboration with Mondadori, publishing three books (La Viandanza, La Pianta del Pane, and Da Mani Mortali) in the prestigious collection Lo Specchio, which had previously published protagonists of the Italian Modernism such as Eugenio Montale, Giuseppe Ungaretti, and Umberto Saba. Mondadori also published a collection of all of her poems from 1971 to 2017, which she curated herself and included an unpublished section titled La Materia Prima. Her last book, Nessuno Veda Nessuno, was published posthumous in 2022 by Mondadori. Frabotta received numerous literary prizes, including the Premio Tropea (1989), Premio Montale (1995), Premio Dessì (2003), and Premio L'Olio della Poesia (2015).

Critics such as Stefano Giovanardi argue that Frabotta's poetic language has evolved from an initial experimentalism to a more cohesive, recognizable voice developed towards the end of the millennium. Such a transition, in opposition with the mainstream tendencies of European postmodernism, led her poetry to a style that is, at the same time, harmonically classical and yet marked by sudden stridencies, rhythmic gaps, and unexpected turns of the imagery. However, Frabotta's work as a writer, and particularly as a poet, remains interdigitated with her political and academic experiences. According to Keala Jewell: "Frabotta weaves into her female poetic web the fragments of a tradition in which, as a literary scholar, she is steeped yet which she also refuses."

=== Death ===
Frabotta died on May 2, 2022, at the age of 75.

== Selected works ==
=== Poetry ===
- Affeminata (Geiger: Turin, 1976)
- Il Rumore Bianco (Feltrinelli: Milan, 1982)
- Appunti di volo (La Cometa: Rome, 1985)
- Controcanto al Chiuso (Rossi&Spera: Rome, 1991)
- La viandanza (Mondadori: Milan, 1995)
- Terra Contigua (Empirìa: Rome, 1999)
- La Pianta del Pane (Mondadori: Milan, 2003)
- Gli Eterni Lavori (San Marco dei Giustiniani: Genova, 2005)
- I Nuovi Climi (Stampa: Brunello, 2007)
- Da Mani Mortali (Mondadori: Milan, 2012)
- Per il Giusto Verso (Manni: Bari, 2015)
- Tutte le poesie (1971–2017) (Mondadori: Milan, 2018), includes the unpublished collection La materia prima
- Nessuno veda nessuno (Mondadori: Milan, 2022)

=== Theatre ===
- Tensioni (Eidos: Milan-Venice, 1989)
- Controcanto al Chiuso (La Cometa: Rome, 1994)
- Trittico dell'Obbedienza (Sellerio: Palermo, 1996)

=== Prose ===
- Velocità di Fuga (Reverdito: Trento, 1989), (new edition Fve Editori: Milan, 2022) novel.
- Quartetto per Masse e Voce Sola (Donzelli: Rome, 2009), non-fiction.

=== Essays ===
- Carlo Cattaneo (Fondazione Ticino Nostro: Lugano, 1969)
- La Letteratura al Femminile (De Donato: Bari, 1980)
- Giorgio Caproni, il Poeta del Disincanto (Officina: Rome, 1993)
- L'Estrema Volontà (Giulio Perrone Editore: Rome, 2010)
