= Proletarian Unity Party (Italy) =

Proletarian Unity Party Partito di Unità Proletaria
- Abbreviation: PdUP
- Founded: 1972
- Dissolved: 1984
- Merger of: New PSIUP; Socialist Alternative
- Merged into: Italian Communist Party
- Newspaper: Unità Proletaria; Il manifesto
- Ideology: Communism; Socialism
- Political position: Far-left
- European Parliament group: Technical Group of Independents (1979–84)
- Colours: Red

The Proletarian Unity Party (Italian: Partito di Unità Proletaria, PdUP) was a far-left political party in Italy.

== Origins ==
The PdUP was founded in November 1972 by the minority factions of two parties: the New PSIUP, led by Vittorio Foa and Silvano Miniati, which gathered those militants from the Italian Socialist Party of Proletarian Unity (PSIUP) who had not agreed on the decision to join the Italian Communist Party (PCI); and Socialist Alternative, led by Giovanni Russo Spena and philosopher Domenico Jervolino, which was composed of several renegades from the left wing of the Workers' Political Movement (MPL) who had opposed that party's earlier merger with the Italian Socialist Party (PSI). The new party's symbol was the hammer and sickle over the world, which it had inherited from the PSIUP.

In 1974 these members were joined by Il Manifesto, a group which had been expelled from the PCI some years earlier, and by the Autonomist Student Movement led by Mario Capanna. Together, they merged to form the Proletarian Unity Party for Communism (Italian: Partito di Unità Proletaria per il Comunismo). The now expanded party's founding congress was held on January 29, 1976. The leaders of the party's three main currents were: Miniati, Foa and Capanna (predominantly ex-PSIUP and far left-oriented, with a grounding in operaismo or "workerism"); Rossana Rossanda and Lucio Magri (who both hailed from Il Manifesto, and leant towards collaborating with the PCI and the communist-backed CGIL trade union); and Luigi Pintor (who headed a minor 'third force' that frequently maintained the balance of power). Magri was elected as the party's first national secretary.

During the 1976 general elections, the PdUP ran as part of an electoral coalition under the Proletarian Democracy (Democrazia proletaria; DP) banner. The party gained three seats in the Italian Chamber of Deputies (won by Magri, Eliseo Milani and Luciana Castellina) out of the coalition's total of six.

== Splits and alliances ==
By 1977, tension had begun to develop within the party between its ex-PSIUP/MPL founders and Magri's Il Manifesto faction. The latter was deeply disappointed by the failure of the Italian left to establish a national government, but its focus on capturing power at the very top had always gone against the grain of the party's operaista (workerist) roots, which were typified by Foa's public insistence that "the real issue [for the party] was workers' control: left-wing power must be rooted in the struggles of the factories." Consequently, on February 20, 1977, the two tendencies split to form separate sections, with the far-left operaista element under Foa and Capanna soon abandoning the PdUP altogether in order to help constitute Proletarian Democracy formally as a new party. Magri's majority had earlier absorbed the Avanguardia Operaia movement, but it too was to leave the PdUP in 1978 following the congress held at Viareggio that year. However, during its third congress in Rome in 1981, the party was joined by the Workers' Movement for Socialism (Movimento Lavoratori per il Socialismo; MLS), a Maoist group led by Luca Cafiero.

== Absorption into the PCI and later events ==
After the elections of 1983, the PdUP joined the PCI list, to which it had become closer after the PCI secretary Enrico Berlinguer had abandoned the Historic Compromise (a project for a PCI-Christian Democracy alliance).

On November 25, 1984, the PdUP merged into the PCI. When, in 1991, Achille Occhetto started the process of transforming the PCI into the social democratic-oriented Democratic Party of the Left (PDS), some former PdUP members declared their opposition to the move and joined the Communist Refoundation Party (PRC). After the latter withdrew from the centre-left Lamberto Dini government in 1995, many former PdUP members left the party to create the Movement of Unitarian Communists, which later was absorbed into the PDS' heir, the Democrats of the Left.

== Notable members ==
- Vittorio Agnoletto
- Luca Cafiero
- Mario Capanna
- Massimo Caprara
- Luciana Castellina
- Mario Catalano
- Famiano Crucianelli
- Ivano Di Cerbo
- Davide Ferrari
- Vittorio Foa
- Paolo Gentiloni
- Alfonso Gianni
- Franco Grillini
- Lucio Magri
- Ramon Mantovani
- Lidia Menapace
- Eliseo Milani
- Silvano Miniati
- Roberto Musacchio
- Aldo Natoli
- Valentino Parlato
- Carlo Petrini
- Luciano Pettinari
- Luigi Pintor
- Rossana Rossanda
- Marianella Sclavi
- Giovanni Russo Spena
- Massimo Serafini
- Sebastiano Timpanaro
- Vincenzo Vita

== Election results ==
=== Italian Parliament ===
Chamber of Deputies
Election	Votes	%	Seats	+/–	Leader	Government
1976	into DP	–	5 / 630	–	Lucio Magri	Opposition
1979	502,247 (9th)	1.4	6 / 630	▲1	Luciana Castellina	Opposition
1983	into PCI	–	1 / 630	▼5	Lucio Magri	Opposition

=== European Parliament ===
European Parliament
Election year	Votes	%	Seats	+/−	Leader
1979	406,656 (9th)	1.2	1 / 81	–	Luciana Castellina
1984	into PCI	–	0 / 81	▼1	Lucio Magri

=== Regional elections ===
Regions of Italy
Election year	Votes	%	Seats	+/−	Leader
1975	147,030 (9th)	0.5	4 / 720	–	Lucio Magri
1980	372,102 (8th)	1.2	8 / 720	▲4	Luciana Castellina
