= Rossana Rossanda =

Italian communist politician, journalist, and feminist (1924–2020)

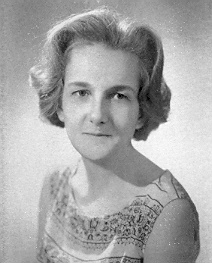
- Rossana Rossanda in 1963.

Member of the Chamber of Deputies
- In office 16 May 1963 – 4 June 1968
- Constituency: Milan

Personal details
- Born: 23 April 1924 Pula, Kingdom of Italy (now Croatia)
- Died: 20 September 2020 (aged 96) Rome, Italy
- Party: PCI (1948–1969); PdUP (1974–1984)
- Education: University of Milan
- Occupation: Journalist, politician

Rossana Rossanda (23 April 1924 – 20 September 2020) was an Italian communist politician, journalist, author, and feminist.

== Biography ==
Rossanda was born in Pula, then part of Kingdom of Italy. She studied in Milan and was a student of philosopher Antonio Banfi. At a very young age, she took part in the Italian resistance. Following the end of World War II, she joined the Italian Communist Party (PCI). After a short period, the party secretary Palmiro Togliatti named her responsible for culture in the party. She was elected for the first time to the Italian Chamber of Deputies in 1963.

In 1968, Rossanda published a small essay entitled L'anno degli studenti ("The Year of the Students"), in which she declared her support for the youth movement. Rossanda was part of a minority inside the PCI that was against the Soviet Union, and together with Luigi Pintor, Valentino Parlato, and Lucio Magri founded the party and newspaper il manifesto. This caused her expulsion from the PCI after its XII National Congress held in Bologna.

In the 1972 Italian general election, il manifesto obtained 0.8% of the votes. In 1974, it merged with the Proletarian Unity Party, forming the Proletarian Unity Party for Communism (PdUP). She later abandoned party politics but kept her role as director of il manifesto. Between 1981 and 1983, she was also a member of the editorial board of the feminist magazine L'Orsaminore.

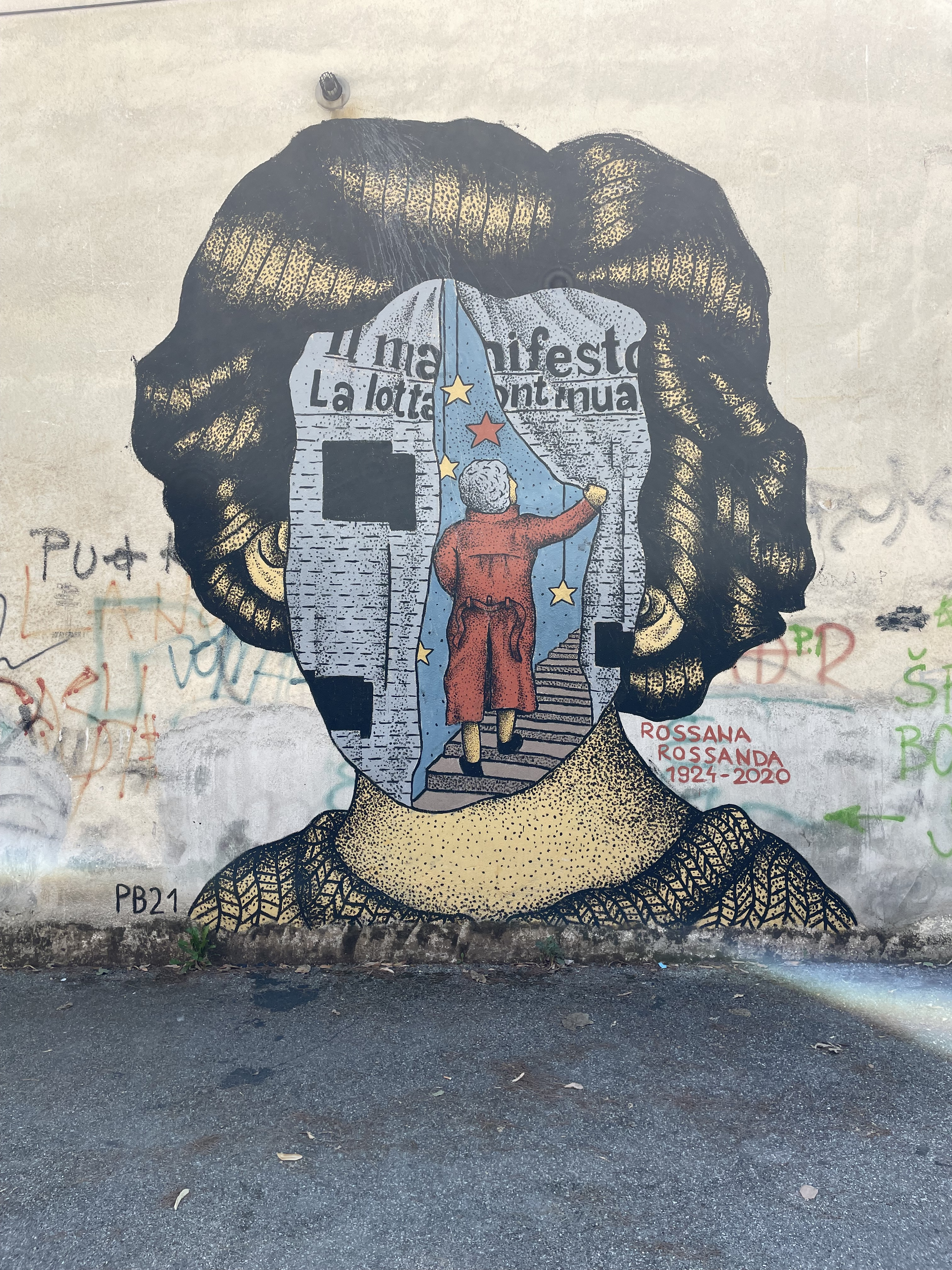
Mural of Rossanda in Pula

Rossanda died on 20 September 2020 at the age of 96.

== Selected works ==
- L'anno degli studenti (1968)
- Über die Dialektik von Kontinuität und Bruch (1975)
- Le altre. Conversazioni sulle parole della politica (1979)
- "A Splendid Life". Telos 44 (Summer 1980)
- Un viaggio inutile (1981)
- Appuntamenti di fine secolo (1995)
- La vita breve (Pratiche, 1996)
- Note a margine (1996)
- La ragazza del secolo scorso (2005, finalist for the Premio Strega 2006)
