= Lucio Magri =

Italian journalist and politician (1932–2011)

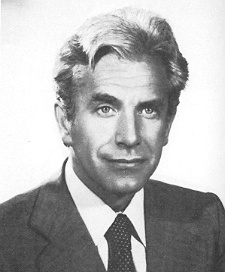
- Lucio Magri in 1976.

Member of the Chamber of Deputies
- In office 5 July 1976 – 14 April 1994
- Constituency: Rome (1976–1979); Turin (1979–1992); L'Aquila (1992–1994)

Personal details
- Born: 19 August 1932 Ferrara, Italy
- Died: 28 November 2011 (aged 79) Bellinzona, Switzerland
- Party: DC (until 1958); PCI (1958–1969; 1984–1991); PdUP (1974–1984); PRC (1991–1995); MCU (1995–1998)
- Occupation: Journalist, politician

Lucio Magri (19 August 1932 – 28 November 2011) was an Italian journalist and politician.

== Biography ==
Magri was born in Ferrara in Emilia-Romagna, one of the most left-wing regions of Italy, but grew up in the strongly Catholic Bergamo, Lombardy. His first involvement in politics was as a member of the Christian Democrats, taking up positions firmly on the left wing of the party. However, in 1958 he was one of a number of Catholic intellectuals who joined the Italian Communist Party (PCI). In 1969, he was one of the founders of the far-left newspaper il manifesto, co-editing it with Rossana Rossanda. The newspaper's work was controversial with the Communist Party's leadership, and by the end of that year Magri had been expelled from the party.

He was co-founder (in 1974) and secretary of the Proletarian Unity Party (PdUP), which later merged with the PCI in 1984. When the latter renounced communism to become the Democratic Party of the Left in 1991, Magri joined the newly-established Communist Refoundation Party (PRC), founding an internal movement within the party whose structure recalled that of the PdUP.

In 1995 he left the PRC to form the Movement of Unitarian Communists, established to support a centrist cabinet led by Lamberto Dini. When the Movement entered the newly formed Democratic Party of the Left in 1998, Magri abandoned it, devoting himself only to il manifesto.

In 2009 he published an essay on the history of the Italian Communist Party, entitled Il sarto di Ulm. Una possibile storia del PCI ("The Tailor of Ulm. A possible history of the PCI"). In 2011, Verso Books published The Tailor of Ulm: Communism in the Twentieth Century. Reviewing the book, John Green praised it as 'an invaluable platform for understanding the apparent impasse of the present global and systemic crisis'.

In his later years, Magri suffered from depression, exacerbated by the death of his wife Mara in 2008. He chose to take up assisted suicide, dying in Zurich, Switzerland. He was survived by a daughter, Jessica, and a granddaughter, Emma.

== Electoral history ==
Election	House	Constituency	Party	Votes	Result
1976	Chamber of Deputies	Rome–Viterbo–Latina–Frosinone	DP	10,369	Elected
1979	Chamber of Deputies	Turin–Novara–Vercelli	PdUP	2,472	Elected
1983	Chamber of Deputies	Turin–Novara–Vercelli	PCI	46,878	Elected
1987	Chamber of Deputies	Turin–Novara–Vercelli	PCI	13,073	Elected
1992	Chamber of Deputies	L'Aquila–Pescara–Chieti–Teramo	PRC	2,446	Elected

== Gallery ==
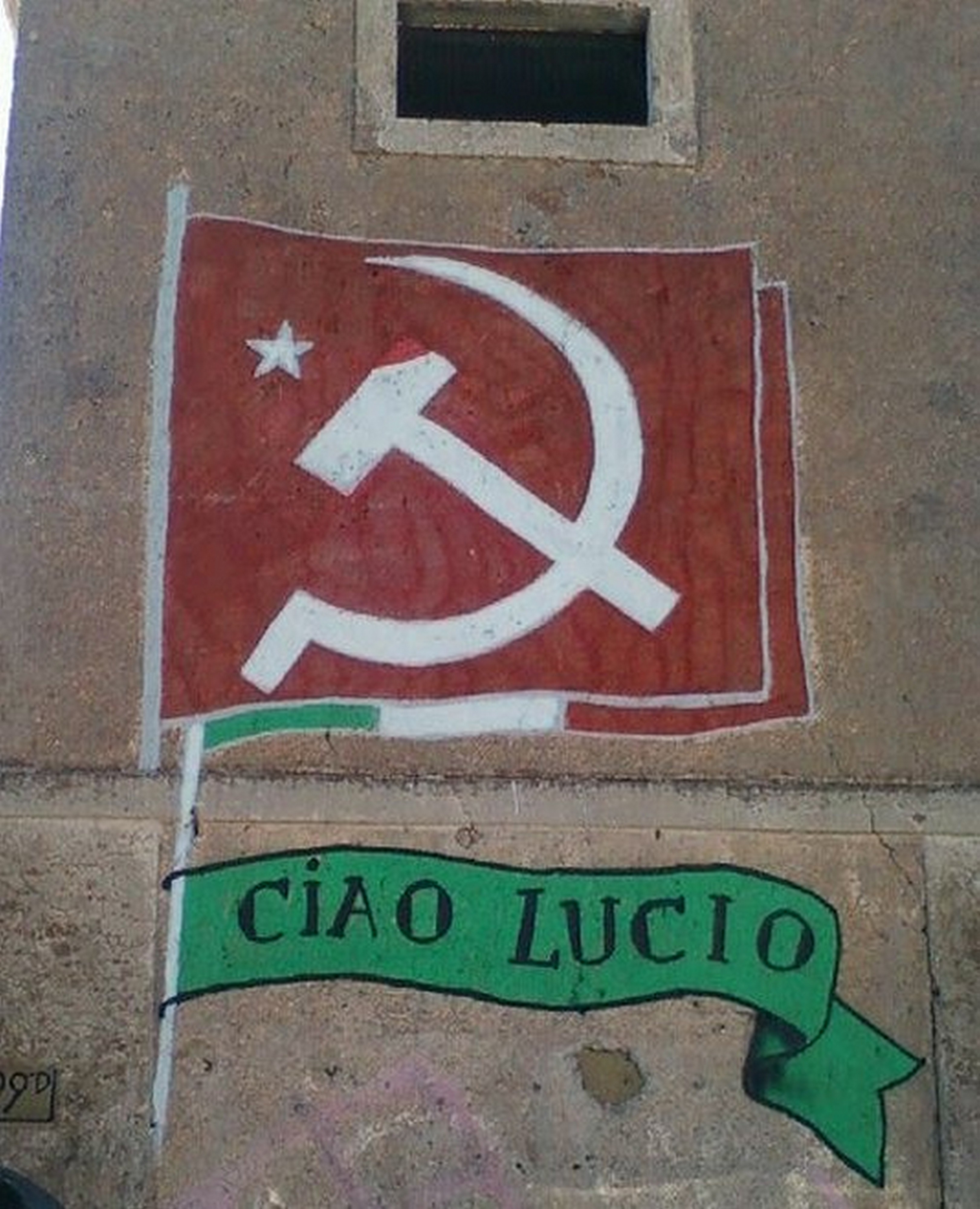
Pro-communist graffito in Rome commemorating Lucio Magri, 2013

== Sources ==
- 'Retracing a Century', Review 31
