= Luciana Castellina =

Italian politician, journalist, and writer (born 1929)

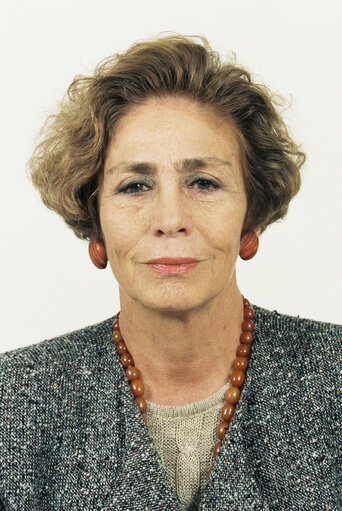

Member of the European Parliament
- In office 17 July 1979 – 19 July 1999
- Constituency: Central Italy (1979–1984; 1989–1999); North-East Italy (1984–1989)

Member of the Chamber of Deputies
- In office 23 April 1992 – 6 May 1992
- Constituency: Perugia
- In office 12 July 1983 – 23 May 1984
- Constituency: Milan
- In office 5 July 1976 – 4 October 1979
- Constituency: Como

Personal details
- Born: 9 August 1929 (age 97) Rome, Italy
- Party: PCI (1947–1970; 1984–1991); PdUP (1974–1984); PRC (1991–1996); SEL (2015–2017); SI (since 2017)
- Spouse: Alfredo Reichlin (m. 1953; div. 1958)
- Children: 2
- Education: Sapienza University of Rome
- Occupation: Politician, journalist, writer

Luciana Castellina (born 9 August 1929) is an Italian journalist, writer, politician, and feminist.

== Biography ==
Castellina was born in Rome on 9 August 1929. She graduated in law from Sapienza University of Rome. In 1947, she joined the Italian Communist Party. Castellina started her career in journalism in the 1950s, working for the daily newspaper Paese Sera. She later worked for several other newspapers, including L'Unità, il manifesto, and Liberazione. Her writings focused on issues such as workers' rights, feminism, and communism. In 1974, she was co-founder of the Proletarian Unity Party for Communism. She served four terms in Italy's Chamber of Deputies and twenty years in the European Parliament. As a member of the European Parliament, she served as chair of the Committee on Culture, Youth, Education and the Media and of the Committee on External Economic Relations.

Castellina was president of Italia cinema, an agency to promote Italian films abroad, from 1998 to 2003. She served as editor of Nuova Generazione, a Communist youth magazine, and of Liberazione, and also played an important role at il manifesto. Castellina was named an Officier in the French Ordre des Arts et des Lettres and a Comendadora (Commander) of the Republic of Argentina. In the 2015 Italian presidential election, Left Ecology Freedom supported Castellina's name as possible successor of Giorgio Napolitano as president of Italy. She was supported for the first three ballots until the party decided to support for the fourth ballot Sergio Mattarella, who was later elected president.

== Personal life ==
Luciana Castellina was married to Italian Communist Party leader Alfredo Reichlin. They have two children, Lucrezia and Pietro, both of them economists.

== Electoral history ==
Election	House	Constituency	Party	Votes	Result
1976	Chamber of Deputies	Como–Sondrio–Varese	DP	2,862	Elected
1979	Chamber of Deputies	Como–Sondrio–Varese	PdUP	1,598	Elected
1979	European Parliament	Central Italy	PdUP	14,957	Elected
1983	Chamber of Deputies	Milan–Pavia	PCI	30,044	Elected
1984	European Parliament	North-East Italy	PCI	89,998	Elected
1989	European Parliament	Central Italy	PCI	75,826	Elected
1992	Chamber of Deputies	Perugia–Terni–Rieti	PRC	3,105	Elected
1994	European Parliament	Central Italy	PRC	68,127	Elected

== Selected books ==
- Cinquant'anni d'Europa (2007)
- Eurollywood, Il difficile ingresso della cultura nella costruzione dell'Europa (2008)
- La scoperta del mondo (2011), a finalist for the Strega Prize
- Siberiana (2012), winner of the Letterario Vallombrosa Prize
- Guardati dalla mia fame (2014), with Milena Agus
- Manuale antiretorico dell'Unione Europea (2016)
