= Il manifesto =

Italian daily newspaper

il manifesto
- Quotidiano comunista ("Communist newspaper")

- Front page of il manifesto on 20 April 2005, the day after the election of Pope Benedict XVI
- Type: Daily newspaper
- Format: Berliner
- Owner: Il nuovo manifesto società cooperativa editrice
- Editor: Andrea Fabozzi
- Founded: 1969; 57 years ago
- Political alignment: Socialism; Communism
- Headquarters: Rome, Lazio, Italy
- Circulation: 11,324 (May 2016)
- ISSN: 0025-2158
- Website: ilmanifesto.it

Il manifesto (Italian pronunciation: [il maniˈfɛsto]; English: "the manifesto") is an Italian daily newspaper published in Rome. While calling itself "communist" and broadly left-wing, it is not connected to any political party.

== History and profile ==
il manifesto was founded as a monthly review in 1969. Its founders were a collection of left-wing journalists who engaged in the wave of critical thought and activity on the Italian left in that period. They included Luigi Pintor, Valentino Parlato, Lucio Magri, and Rossana Rossanda. In April 1971, it became a daily. It participated as a separate political party in the 1972 election, but won only 0,67% of the vote. In July 1974 this party merged with the Proletarian Unity Party, forming the "PdUP per il Comunismo". This resulted in a period of internal tensions between those who wanted to safeguard the journal's independence and those who aimed to transform it into the new party's press organ. In 1978, the former group came out victorious as the leadership of il manifesto largely left the PdUP and the newspaper fully regained its autonomy.

Although critical of the Italian Communist Party (PCI), it was popular with many party supporters who saw it as more lively and independent than the party newspaper l'Unità. The 1991 dissolution of the PCI that gave birth to the social-democratic Democratic Party of the Left was not followed by il manifesto, a paper that maintains positions closer to those of more left-wing parties, such as the Communist Refoundation Party, while remaining independent. il manifesto is known in Italy for its bitter and sarcastic headlines, puns, and clever choice of photographs. For example, the day of the election of Pope Benedict XVI, the first page of il manifesto featured a large photo of the newly elected pope along with the title "the German Shepherd" (A pun on the Italian word for pastor.). Throughout its history, eminent Italian literary personalities have contributed to the newspaper such as the satirical poet Stefano Benni, the novelist Erri De Luca, and the novelist, philosopher, and linguist Umberto Eco. Additionally, it has included the satirical drawings of Vauro Senesi. For several years throughout the 1970s and 2000s, Parlato served as the editor-in-chief of the daily. From 2010 to 2023, its director included Norma Rangeri.

On 21 December 2000, the newspaper's office in Rome was the target of a bomb attack by Andrea Insabato, a neo-fascist with past ties to the Nuclei Armati Rivoluzionari and Terza Posizione. Insabato was seriously injured when the bomb detonated prematurely, and he was the attack's only casualty. One of its reporters, Giuliana Sgrena, was kidnapped by Iraqi insurgents in February 2005 and released on 4 March of that same year. A controversy erupted when the Rescue of Giuliana Sgrena resulted in the shooting of her rescue vehicle by American troops and the killing of an Italian security agent.

== Financial problems ==
By the late 2000s, state aid to media in Italy was dropping and il manifesto began to operate at a loss. It was owned by a cooperative of journalists until entering legal liquidation in February 2012. Despite this, it continued to publish. The cooperative announced a subscription campaign to purchase the rights to the brand, which succeed in July 2016.

== Circulation ==
il manifesto had a circulation of 24,728 copies in 2008, 22,140 copies in 2009, and 18,978 copies in 2010. Its circulation fell to 10,516 by 2014.

== Editors-in-chief ==
- Luigi Pintor (28 April 1971 – 19 September 1975)
- Valentino Parlato (19 September 1975 – 18 February 1976)
- Luigi Pintor, Luciana Castellina, Pino Ferraris, Vittorio Foa, Valentino Parlato, and Rossana Rossanda (18 February 1976 – 3 July 1976)
- Luciana Castellina, Valentino Parlato, and Rossana Rossanda (3 July 1976 – 2 March 1978)
- Valentino Parlato (2 March 1978 – November 1985)
- Rina Gagliardi and Mauro Paissan (November 1985 – November 1986)
- Valentino Parlato (January 1988 – July 1990)
- Sandro Medici (July 1990 – November 1991)
- Luigi Pintor (November 1991 – October 1995)
- Valentino Parlato (October 1995 – March 1998)
- Riccardo Barenghi (March 1998 – December 2003)
- Mariuccia Ciotta and Gabriele Polo (December 2003 – June 2009)
- Valentino Parlato (June 2009 – 4 May 2010)
- Norma Rangeri and Angelo Mastrandera (4 May 2010 – 31 December 2012)
- Norma Rangeri (1 January 2013 – 4 June 2014)
- Norma Rangeri and Tommaso Di Francesco (4 June 2014 – 27 June 2023)
- Andrea Fabozzi (since 28 June 2023)

== See also ==
- List of newspapers in Italy
