= List of Italian Communist Refoundation Party politicians =

A list of notable politicians of the Communist Refoundation Party (Italy):

== A ==
- Maurizio Acerbo
- Vittorio Agnoletto
- Vincenzo Aita

== B ==
- Fausto Bertinotti

== C ==
- Giusto Catania
- Ludovico Corrao
- Armando Cossutta
- Rosario Crocetta

== D ==
- Pancrazio De Pasquale

== F ==
- Francesco Ferrara
- Paolo Ferrero
- Francesco Forgione

== G ==
- Corrado Gabriele
- Sergio Garavini
- Franco Giordano
- Claudio Grassi
- Vladimir Luxuria

== I ==
- Pietro Ingrao

== M ==
- Lucio Magri
- Graziella Mascia
- Luisa Morgantini
- Roberto Musacchio

== N ==
- Nerio Nesi

== P ==
- Giovanni Pesce
- Giuliano Pisapia

== R ==
- Mario Ricci
- Marco Rizzo

== V ==
- Dacia Valent
- Nichi Vendola
