= Refoundation for the Left =

Political party

Logo

Refoundation for the Left (Rifondazione per la Sinistra, RpS) was a faction within the Communist Refoundation Party, a political party in Italy. Most of its members launched the Movement for the Left (MpS) in late January 2009. Another part of its members decided not to leave the Party, "going on with the Refoudation process".

== History ==
RpS emerged as a faction within the Communist Refoundation Party (PRC) gathering the Bertinottiani, the group around Fausto Bertinotti, who controlled the majority of the party from 1998 to 2008. They supported the candidacy of Nichi Vendola for party secretary in the 24–27 July 2008 congress of the party. Vendola was defeated and Paolo Ferrero, a former bertinottiano who gained the support of the party's left-wing, became secretary. The faction was officially launched during a "national assembly" on 27 September 2008.

Refoundation for the Left represented the modernisers within the party and supports the creation of a united left with greens, socialists and other radicals (in fact they were among the keenest supporters of The Left – The Rainbow), both in Italy and in Europe. As Vendola explained in an interview, he will seek an alliance with the Democratic Party, excluding Antonio Di Pietro's Italy of Values, whose "justicialism" is an "illness".

In January 2009 the new leadership of the party replaced the editor of Liberazione, the party's newspaper, removing Piero Sansonetti, close to Vendola. The decision was strongly opposed by Vendoliani. At the same time Ferrero ruled out any alliance for the European Parliament election, in which the party will run alone, provoking another rift with Vendoliani, who were keen supporters joint-list with other left-wing forces, and that was considered another step toward the break-up of the party.

On 24 January the group around Vendola, including Franco Giordano, Gennaro Migliore and Alfonso Gianni, finally decided to leave the party and to transform their faction into a party, the Movement for the Left (MpS). However some members of the faction, including Giusto Catania, Milziade Caprili and Tommaso Sodano, decided not to leave the PRC and re-organized themselves into To the Left with Refoundation, while Bertinotti decided not to take any decision for now. The group that decided not to leave the Prc chose Rosa Rinaldi and Augusto Rocchi as national leaders.

Soon after Rocchi, Rinaldi and their group took back the "Refoundation for the Left" title.

In October 2010 Augusto Rocchi and Rosa Rinaldi (the two leaders of Rps) decided to resign and to leave the leadership of the faction to a third person, because of their full-time activity in the National Secretariate of Communist Refoundation Party. The assembly of Rps elected Stefano Zuccherini new leader.
