= Movement for the Left =

Italian political party

Movement for the Left Movimento per la Sinistra
- Leader: Nichi Vendola
- Founded: 25 January 2009
- Dissolved: 22 October 2010
- Split from: Communist Refoundation Party
- Merged into: Left Ecology Freedom
- Headquarters: via Goito, 39; 00185 Rome
- Newspaper: none
- Membership: unknown
- Ideology: Socialism
- Political position: Left-wing
- European affiliation: Party of the European Left
- European Parliament group: European United Left–Nordic Green Left

Website
- www.movimento perlasinistra.it

Movement for the Left (Italian: Movimento per la Sinistra, MpS) was a socialist political party in Italy. It emerged as a split from the Communist Refoundation Party and later merged into Left Ecology Freedom. Its leader was Nichi Vendola.

== History ==
MpS emerged from the split of Refoundation for the Left (RpS), a faction within the Communist Refoundation Party (PRC) composed of the bulk of the Bertinottiani, the group around Fausto Bertinotti that retained the majority of the party from 1998 to 2008. They supported the candidacy of Nichi Vendola for party secretary in the 24–27 July 2008 congress of the party. Vendola was defeated and Paolo Ferrero, a former bertinottiano who gained the support of the party's left-wing, became secretary. RpS represented the modernisers within the party and supported the creation of a united left with greens, socialists and other radicals (in fact they were among the keenest supporters of The Left – The Rainbow), both in Italy and in Europe.

In January 2009 the new leadership of the PRC replaced the editor of Liberazione, the party's newspaper, removing Piero Sansonetti, close to Vendola. The decision was strongly opposed by Vendoliani. At the same time Ferrero ruled out any alliance for the European Parliament election, in which the party will run alone, provoking another rift with Vendoliani, who were keen supporters joint-list with other left-wing forces, and that was considered another step toward the break-up of the party.

On 24 January the group around Vendola, including Franco Giordano, Gennaro Migliore and Alfonso Gianni, finally decided to leave the party and to transform their faction into a party. However some members of the faction, including Giusto Catania, Milziade Caprili and Tommaso Sodano, decided not to leave the PRC and re-organized themselves into To the Left with Refoundation, while Bertinotti decided not to take any decision for now, participating to the inauguration of the party's headquarters on 3 March 2009 in Rome and to the assembly of those RpS members who decided to stay in the PRC.

The goal of MpS was that of forming a new party with other left-wing groups, including Democratic Left (SD), Unite the Left (UlS) and United to the Left (UaS). That is why Vendoliani sought to form a joint list for the 2009 European Parliament election with these political forces (or even the Federation of the Greens in a sort of re-edition of The Left – The Rainbow), while refusing any proposal of "communist joint list" with the Party of Italian Communists (PdCI), although Vendola did not rule out an alliance comprising also the PRC and the PdCI.

On 16 March 2009, MpS formed a joint electoral list named Left and Freedom with the Greens, the Democratic Left, Unite the Left and the Socialist Party, a moderate social-democratic outfit, in order to overcome the 4% threshold recently introduced in the electoral law. According to Vendola, such a coalition could become a stable and reliable ally for Democratic Party.

On 22 October 2010, Left and Freedom, renamed Left Ecology Freedom, and minus the Socialists and Greens, was founded as a political party.

== Leadership ==
The party was led by a group of coordination elected during the 27 January 2009 assembly and composed of Celeste Costantino, Elettra Deiana, Titti De Simone, Daniele Farina, Nicola Fratoianni, Alfonso Gianni, Beatrice Giavazzi, Gennaro Migliore, Elisabetta Piccolotti and Alì Khalil.
