= Being Communists =

Communist Refoundation Party faction in Italy

Being Communists (Essere Comunisti) was a faction within the Communist Refoundation Party in Italy. It was formed in 1998 by former followers of Armando Cossutta, who left the party in 1998 to form the Party of Italian Communists. The leader of the group was Claudio Grassi.

The faction was the "traditionalist" wing of the party: it did not agree with what it considered an excessive criticism of real socialism, the Soviet Union and the Italian Communist Party. As proud communists, the group members were not generally keen on the party's participation to the European Left. In 2005 the group obtained the 26.5% of the delegates to the VI national congress of the party, while two years later it suffered the split of some hard-liners led by Fosco Giannini, who set up The Ernesto.

In April 2008, following the severe defeat of the party in the 2008 general election, a group of former Bertinottiani, mainly former members of Proletarian Democracy led by Paolo Ferrero and Giovanni Russo Spena, criticized The Left – The Rainbow joint list and Fausto Bertinotti's political line. Soon after this group, named Refoundation in Movement, formed an alliance with Being Communists in order to overthrow the leadership of the party, which was then led by Franco Giordano, a bertinottiano. In the July 2008 congress the motion supported by the two groups obtained 40.1% of the delegates and Ferrero was elected secretary with the support of other minority factions.

Between 2014 and 2016 all the faction quit the PRC and joined Left Ecology Freedom (SEL), later renamed Italian Left (SI).
