= Countercurrent (Italy, 2006) =

Trotskyist political group in Italy

Countercurrent Controcorrente
- Founded: 2006
- Headquarters: Genoa, Italy
- Newspaper: Resistenze (Resistance)
- Ideology: Trotskyism; Socialism; Marxism
- Political position: Far-left
- Colours: Red

Countercurrent (Italian: Controcorrente) is a small Italian Trotskyist political group. It used to be a faction within the Communist Refoundation Party.

The group emerged in 2006 as a split from Communist Project, when their leader Marco Ferrando decided to leave the party in order to form his own Workers' Communist Party. For the 24–27 July 2008 congress the faction formed a common list with The Ernesto, another minority faction, and obtained 7.7% of the delegates. In that occasion they supported the election of Paolo Ferrero, leader of the Refoundation in Movement-Being Communists motion, as party secretary, thus joining for the first time the majority of the party.

In 2010 the faction embraced the Committee for a Workers' International.

In 2013, the party was the most important promoter of the massive Genoa Public Transportation Strike that went on for a week and was considered the biggest non-general strike of the year.

In 2017, Controcorrente left the CWI over disagreements regarding, among other issues, the role of the European Union and Brexit. A large minority including mostly younger members split from Controcorrente to remain part of the CWI (now International Socialist Alternative), forming a new organisation named Resistenze Internazionali.
