= Bertinottiani =

The Bertinottiani were an Italian Political faction around Fausto Bertinotti, the leader of the Communist Refoundation Party (PRC) from 1994 to 2006.

In 1998, in the wake of the crisis of Romano Prodi's first government, Bertinotti convinced the majority of the party to stop supporting the cabinet, provoking the split of the faction led by Armando Cossutta, PRC's founder, who launched the Party of Italian Communists (PdCI). That was when the Bertinottiani took the helm of the party. Bertinotti, who had been secretary since 1993, became the uncontested leader and the Bertinottiani would dominate the party for ten years.

After Bertinotti unsuccessfully led the party (within the Rainbow Left list) in the 2006 general election, in the 2008 congress the Bertinottiani, led by Nichi Vendola and Franco Giordano, were defeated by Paolo Ferrero, After a few months, the pair led their Refoundation for the Left (RpS) faction outside the PRC and formed the Movement for the Left (MpS), which would be merged into Left Ecology Freedom (SEL), which would finally be transformed into Italian Left (SI). In 2009 some Bertinottiani, led by Augusto Rocchi, remained within the PRC, as To the Left with Refoundation.
