= United to the Left =

United to the Left (Uniti a Sinistra) was a network of leftist groups associated with the Communist Refoundation Party (PRC) in Italy from 2005 to 2009. At some point it claimed to have 20,000 members and 300 clubs all around Italy.

In April 2005 Pietro Folena (a leading member of the Democrats of the Left who had been a close aide of Walter Veltroni) and Francesco Martone (a splinter from the Federation of the Greens) left their parties in order to join the PRC.

In July 2008 they formed "United to the Left" as a network of left-wing groups which wanted to take part to Fausto Bertinotti's project of the European Left, along with Antonello Falomi (a former deputy leader of the Democrats of the Left in the Senate who had followed Achille Occhetto into an alliance with Italy of Values for the 2004 European Parliament election) and two leading members of the Italian General Confederation of Labour, Paolo Nerozzi and Gianni Rinaldini. The group was later joined by Maura Cossutta, daughter of Armando and leading member of the Party of Italian Communists.

In the 2006 general election Folena, Falomi and Martone were all re-elected to Parliament in PRC's list. In 2007 United to the Left was a keen supporter of The Left – The Rainbow alliance with the Greens, the Italian Communists and Democratic Left.

After the alliance was trounced by voters in 2008 general election and the Bertinottiani had lost the leadership of the PRC to the internal left in the 24–27 July 2008, United to the Left subsequently ended its collaboration with the PRC. In November 2009 Folena joined the Democratic Party.

== Leadership ==
- Coordinator: Pietro Folena (2005–2009)
