= Eleonora Forenza =

Italian politician (born 1976)

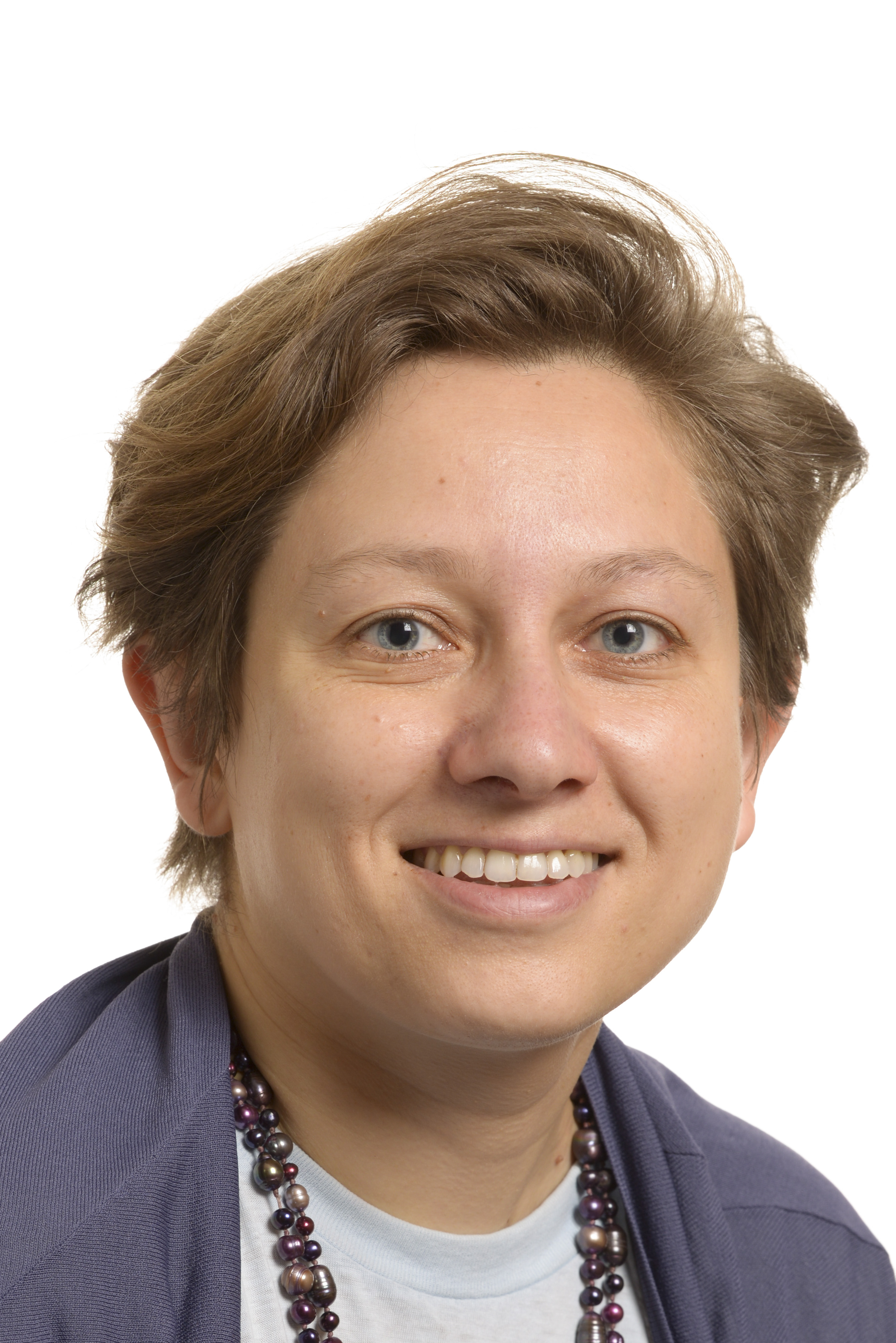
- Official portrait, 2014

Member of the European Parliament for Southern Italy
- In office 1 July 2014 – 1 July 2019

Personal details
- Born: 10 November 1976 (age 49) Bari, Italy
- Party: Italy: Communist Refoundation Party (1996-present); EP: The Left (L'Altra Europa)
- Education: University of Bari; University of Naples "L'Orientale"
- Committees: VIII legislature: Member of the Committee on International Trade; Member of the Delegation to the EU-Chile Joint Parliamentary Committee; Member of the Delegation to the Euro-Latin American Parliamentary Assembly
- Website: eleonoraforenza.it

Eleonora Forenza (born 10 November 1976) is an Italian politician who served as an MEP in the 8th European parliament for Southern Italy.

She's the current spokesperson for culture and communications in the Communist Refoundation Party and also a member of the collective Femministe Nove and the board of the International Gramsci Society of Italy.

== Early life and education ==
Eleonora Forenza was born and raised in Bari. In 2002 she graduated in literature from the University of Bari, where she also got her PhD in 2006 on Italian Studies with a thesis on the literary critic Giacomo Debenedetti. In 2016 she obtained a PhD in History of Women and Gender Identities from the University of Naples "L'Orientale" with a thesis on feminism and the Italian Communist Party. She was a fixed-term researcher in history of political thought at the University of Roma Tre.

== Career ==
Forenza has been active in student and protest movements since the mid-1990s. As a precarious researcher, she joined mobilizations against the university reform by the Berlusconi IV government. In 1996, she joined the Communist Refoundation Party (PRC), remaining an active member.

She participated in the 2001 anti-G8 protests in Genoa, European and World Social Forums, peace and feminist movements, the Zapatista caravan, and campaigns for a basic income. After her time with the PRC's youth wing, in 2006 she joined the party's national political committee and later the leadership. She contributed to Liberazione and the PRC Women's Forum.

Following the Chianciano Congress, she joined the PRC national secretariat, leading the "Culture and Knowledge" area. She supported the motion "Rifondazione in movimento" and opposed dissolving the party. At the Naples Congress, she proposed amendments against the Federation of the Left and opposed alliances with the Democratic Party (PD) under Pier Luigi Bersani.

In the 2013 general elections, she ran with Civil Revolution but was not elected due to the list failing to reach the 4% threshold. After the PRC joined The Other Europe with Tsipras, she ran in the 2014 European elections from the Southern Italy constituency. The list surpassed 4%, and with 22,685 votes, she was elected after Barbara Spinelli opted for another constituency.

She joined the European Parliament, working in The left group on the Committees for International Trade, Women's Rights, and Environment. In 2017, she was nominated for President of the European Parliament but lost to Antonio Tajani.

After the PRC's 2017 Congress, she became a leader of the "Revolution and Refoundation" document, promoting unity in joining alliances with traditional parties. She criticized the "Brancaccio project" for lacking clarity on opposing the PD and PES, and left its first assembly in solidarity with Viola Carofalo, who had been denied the floor.

In 2018, she ran for the Chamber of Deputies with Power to the People! but was not elected due to the list's 3% shortfall. The PRC later withdrew from the project.

In September 2018, she was attacked in Bari by members of the neo-fascist organisation, CasaPound during a protest opposing the visit of Matteo Salvini, a far-right figure and the then Minister of Interior. Her assistant suffered a serious head injury during the assault. Later in June 2025, 17 member of Casapound were convicted for the assault.

In the 2019 European elections, she ran as lead candidate for La Sinistra in the South, receiving 24,443 votes, but was not elected due to the list failing to meet the threshold.

In the 2022 general elections, she ran from a constituency in Lazio for Unione Popolare but was not elected due to the list not reaching the threshold.

In February 2026, the court of Bari convicted twelve Casa Pound militants for reorganizing the fascist party and for fascist demonstrations, for the attack on 21 September 2018, on several anti-fascist demonstrators in Bari, including Eleonora Forenza, who was present at the time of the verdict and cried.

== See also ==
- Luisa Morgantini
