= Communist Project =

The Revolutionary Marxist Association – Communist Project (Associazione Marxista Rivoluzionaria – Progetto Comunista), more frequently referred simply as Communist Project, was a Trotskyist faction within the Communist Refoundation Party (PRC), a political party in Italy. Its leaders were Marco Ferrando and Franco Grisolia.

The faction was largely, though not entirely, a continuation of AMR Proposta, which was the largest section in the International Trotskyist Opposition, and was the second largest section in the Co-ordinating Committee for the Refoundation of the Fourth International.

In January 2006 Ferrando was chosen as one of the candidates of the PRC for the 2006 general election. This caused a division within Communist Project, as a minority led by Francesco Ricci opposed the candidacy of Ferrando, who was eventually excluded from the lists shortly after, when some of his remarks against Israel caused outrage within and outside the party.

In June 2006, after the entry of the PRC into Prodi II Cabinet and disagreements not only with the party majority, at the time led by the Bertinottiani, but also with the other minority factions, The Ernesto and Critical Left, over Italian military involvement in Afghanistan, the leaders of the faction decided to leave the party and launched the Workers' Communist Party (Italy) (PCL). Two months before the group led by Ricci had already left the party in order to launch the Communist Alternative Party (PdAC).
