= Claudio Grassi =

Claudio Grassi may refer to:

- Claudio Grassi (politician) (born 1955)
- Claudio Grassi (tennis) (born 1985)
