= PDAC =

PDAC may refer to:

- Pancreatic ductal adenocarcinoma, a type of pancreatic cancer
- Prospectors & Developers Association of Canada
- Psychopharmacologic Drugs Advisory Committee of the FDA
- Communist Alternative Party, Italian political party
