= Unite the Left =

Italian political party

Unite the Left (Unire la Sinistra) was a minority faction within the Party of Italian Communists (PdCI), a political party in Italy. Its leaders included former minister Katia Bellillo and MEP Umberto Guidoni.

The faction was formed before the July 2008 congress of the PdCI by those who supported the continuation of The Left – The Rainbow and a common path with the other far-left political forces. Bellillo was a candidate for party secretary, but gained only 17% of the support among party members and was defeated by incumbent Oliviero Diliberto. The minority however harshly criticized the party leadership for a lack of democracy in the party.

On 8 February 2009 Unite the Left finally quit the PdCI in order to form a joint-list 2009 European Parliament election with the Movement for the Left, the Federation of the Greens, Democratic Left and United to the Left. The list was named Left Ecology Freedom and was founded as a party on 22 October 2010.

== Leadership ==
- President: Umberto Guidoni (2008–2010)
- Secretary: Luca Robotti (2008–2010)
