= Gennaro Migliore =

Italian politician (born 1968)

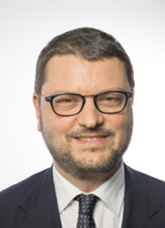

Member of the Chamber of Deputies
- In office 15 March 2013 – 12 October 2022
- In office 28 April 2006 – 28 April 2008

Personal details
- Born: 21 June 1968 (age 58) Naples, Italy
- Party: PRC (1993–2009); SEL (2009–2014); PD (2014–2019); IV (since 2019)
- Children: 2
- Education: University of Naples Federico II
- Profession: Politician
- Website: gennaromigliore.it

Gennaro Migliore (born 21 June 1968 in Naples) is an Italian politician of the Italia Viva party who has served as a member of the Chamber of Deputies from 2006 until 2008 and again since 2013.

== Early life and career ==
Migliore was born on 21 June 1968 in Naples, Campania. Since his birth, he has been living in Casoria. He graduated in Physics in 2012 at the age of 44, with a final score of 110/110 cum laude. Migliore is also registered with the journalists' register.

== Political career ==
Migliore has been twice elected to the municipal council of Naples (1997 and 2001), in the ranks of the Communist Refoundation Party. In 2006 he was elected to the Chamber of Deputies, and served as the parliamentary group leader of the PRC.

In 2008, Migliore was a candidate for the Chamber on the Rainbow Left list, but was not elected due to the failure to cross the electoral threshold of 4%.

In 2009, Migliore left the PRC, to follow Nichi Vendola in his new party, the Movement for the Left (later Left Ecology Freedom).

In 2013, Migliore returned to the Chamber of Deputies and became the parliamentary group leader of SEL. On 18 June 2014, he resigned as parliamentary group leader, following the controversy born after the decision to vote in favor of the IRPEF Decree about the 80 euros in payroll for the medium-low incomes, proposed by the Renzi Cabinet. On 22 October 2014 he finally joined the Democratic Party. In 2016 he was appointed Undersecretary of State for Justice in the Renzi Cabinet, position confirmed also in the next Gentiloni Cabinet (2016–18).

In 2018, Migliore was re-elected to the Chamber of Deputies.

== Political positions ==
In a joint letter initiated by Norbert Röttgen and Anthony Gonzalez ahead of the 47th G7 summit in 2021, Migliore joined some 70 legislators from Europe, the US, and Japan in calling upon their leaders to take a tough stance on China and to "avoid becoming dependent" on the country for technology including artificial intelligence and 5G.
