= Secretary of the Communist Refoundation Party =

Secretary of Communist Refoundation Party

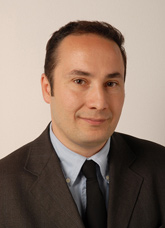
- Incumbent; Maurizio Acerbo since 2 April 2017
- Type: HRO
- Reports to: Party Congress
- Inaugural holder: Sergio Garavini
- Formation: 10 February 1991

The Secretary of the Communist Refoundation Party is the highest ranking official within the Communist Refoundation Party.

== Officeholder ==
N°	Portrait	Officeholder	Tenure	
1		Sergio Garavini (1926–2001)	10 February 1991	27 June 1993
2		Fausto Bertinotti (1940– )	28 June 1993	6 May 2006
3		Franco Giordano (1957– )	7 May 2006	20 April 2008
4		Paolo Ferrero (1960– )	27 July 2008	2 April 2017
5		Maurizio Acerbo (1965– )	2 April 2017	Incumbent

== See also ==
- List of communist parties
