= To the Left with Refoundation =

To the Left with Refoundation (A Sinistra con Rifondazione) was a faction within the Communist Refoundation Party, a communist political party in Italy. Its leader was Augusto Rocchi and represented the right wing of the party.

The faction was formed on 31 January 2009 by those members of Refoundation for the Left who decided not to leave the party, after that the majority of that group had left the party in order to form a new political party on the left, the Movement for the Left (MpS). These included, among many others, Giusto Catania, Milziade Caprili, Tommaso Sodano, Rosa Rinaldi and Marilde Provera. Soon after Rocchi and his group took back the "Refoundation for the Left" name.
