= Giorgio Malentacchi =

Italian politician (1934–2024)

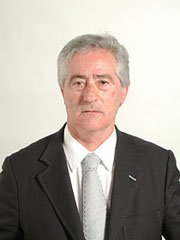
- Official portrait, 2001

Member of the Chamber of Deputies
- In office 9 May 1996 – 29 May 2001
- Constituency: Tuscany

Member of the Senate
- In office 30 May 2001 – 20 November 2002
- Constituency: Tuscany

Personal details
- Born: 9 June 1934 Cortona, Italy
- Died: 16 February 2024 (aged 89) Perugia, Italy
- Party: PRC

Giorgio Malentacchi (9 June 1934 – 16 February 2024) was an Italian politician. A member of the Communist Refoundation Party, he served in the Chamber of Deputies from 1996 to 2001 and in the Senate of the Republic from 2001 to 2002.

Malentacchi died in Perugia on 16 February 2024, at the age of 89.
