= Maurizio Acerbo =

Italian politician (born 1965)

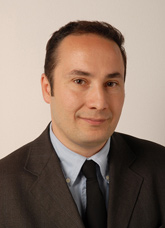
- Official portrait, 2006

Secretary of the Communist Refoundation Party
- Incumbent
- Assumed office 2 April 2017
- Preceded by: Paolo Ferrero

Member of the Chamber of Deputies
- In office 28 April 2006 – 28 April 2008
- Parliamentary group: L'Unione
- Constituency: Abruzzo

Personal details
- Born: 4 December 1965 (age 60) Pescara, Italy
- Party: Italian Communist Party (until 1991); Communist Refoundation (since 1991)
- Profession: Politician

Maurizio Acerbo (born 4 December 1965 in Pescara), is an Italian politician and the current Secretary of the Communist Refoundation Party.

In 1984 he was elected provincial secretary of FGCI (Youth Communist Italian Federation) in Pescara. He was elected for the first time in 1985 as a counselor in the Zanni district of Pescara and later a city councilor in the same city in 1990.

In 1996 he was the founder and radio director of Radio Città Pescara - Popolare Network. He was also regional secretary of the Communist Refoundation of Abruzzo until 2006. In the 2006 Italian general election he was elected to the Chamber of Deputies, while in the 2008 Italian general election he was nominated for the Senate with The Left – The Rainbow, but the list did not exceed the threshold and he wasn't elected.

In the 2008 regional election in Abruzzo he was elected in the Regional Council, while in the 2009 local election he stood for Mayor of Pescara and gaining 2,096 preferences and the 3% of the votes, being elected in the municipal council.

In the regional election in Abruzzo of 2014 he was candidate for President of the region, but he gained only the 3% of the votes and he wasn't re-elected in the Regional Council.

On 2 April 2017, he was appointed as the Secretary of the Communist Refoundation Party.
