= The Ernesto =

The Ernesto (L'Ernesto) was a faction within the Communist Refoundation Party in Italy.

The group emerged in February 2007 as a split from Being Communists, the faction led by Claudio Grassi, and took the name from L'Ernesto, a communist publication. The leaders of the splinter group were Fosco Giannini, a senator at the time, and Gianluigi Pegolo.

In the run-up of the July 2008 congress the faction formed a common list with Counter-current, another minority faction, and obtained 7.7% of the delegates. In that occasion they supported the election of Paolo Ferrero, leader of the Refoundation in Movement-Being Communists motion, as party secretary, thus joining for the first time the majority of the party. However, in 2011 the faction left the party and joined the Party of Italian Communists.
