= Pomaretto =

Pomaretto Pomaret
- Comune
- Comune di Pomaretto
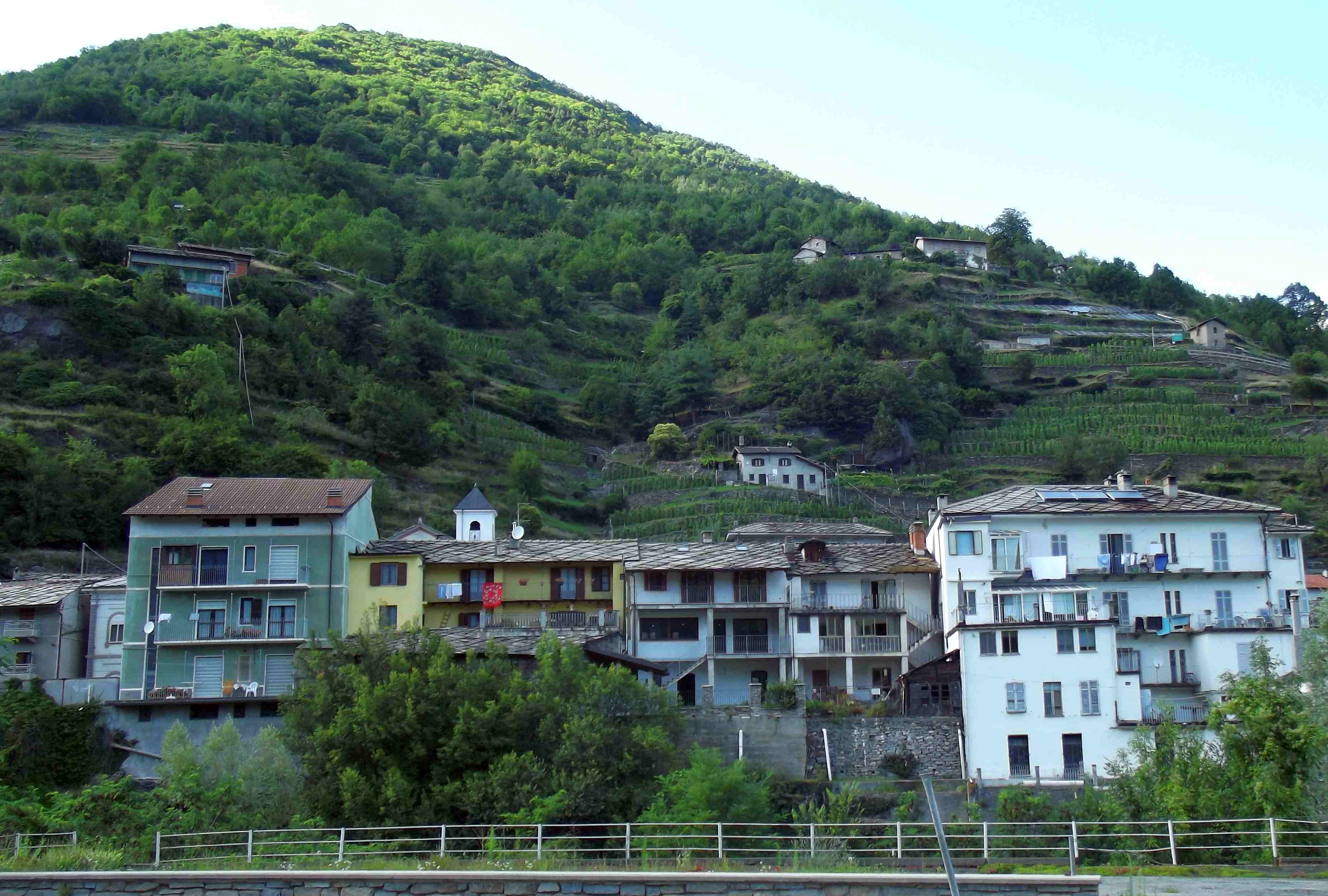

- Location within Italy Location within Piedmont
- Coordinates: 44°57′N 7°11′E
- Country: Italy
- Region: Piedmont
- Metropolitan city: Turin (TO)

Government
  - Mayor: Danilo Stefano Breusa

Area
  - Total: 8.56 km^{2} (3.31 sq mi)
- Elevation: 620 m (2,030 ft)

Population (31 August 2021)
  - Total: 981
  - Density: 115/km^{2} (297/sq mi)
- Demonym: Pomarini
- Time zone: UTC+1 (CET)
  - Summer (DST): UTC+2 (CEST)
- Postal code: 10063
- Dialing code: 0121
- Website: Official website

Pomaretto (French: Pomaret) is a comune (municipality) in the Metropolitan City of Turin in the Italian region Piedmont, located about 45 km southwest of Turin in the Valle Germanasca.

== People ==
- Paolo Ferrero
