= Elisabetta Piccolotti =

Italian politician (born 1982)

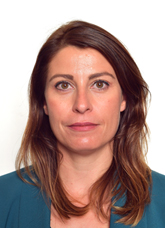
- Piccolotti in 2022

Member of the Chamber of Deputies
- Incumbent
- Assumed office 13 October 2022
- Constituency: Apulia – P04

Personal details
- Born: 10 February 1982 (age 44)
- Party: Italian Left (since 2017)
- Spouse: Nicola Fratoianni (m. 2019)

Elisabetta Piccolotti (born 10 February 1982) is an Italian politician serving as a member of the Chamber of Deputies since 2022. From 2021 to 2023, she served as coordinator of Italian Left.
