= Communist Alternative Party =

Communist Alternative Party Partito di Alternativa Comunista
- Leader: Francesco Ricci
- Founded: 7 January 2007
- Split from: Communist Refoundation Party
- Headquarters: Via Luigi Lodi 68, Rome
- Newspaper: Progetto Comunista
- Youth wing: Giovani Comunisti Rivoluzionari
- Ideology: Communism; Trotskyism
- Political position: Far-left
- International affiliation: International Workers League (Fourth International)

Website
- partitodialternativacomunista.org

The Communist Alternative Party (Partito di Alternativa Comunista, PdAC) is a communist political party in Italy. Its leader and founder is Francesco Ricci.

== History ==
In April 2006 some members of Communist Project, a trotskyist faction within the Communist Refoundation Party (PRC), left the party and launched the PdAC, which was officially founded on 7 January 2007. In June 2006, the Communist Project itself left Communist Refoundation under the new name of Communist Workers' Party.

In the 2008 general election the PdAC, that candidated Fabiana Stefanoni for Prime Minister, obtained the 0.01% of the vote for the Chamber of Deputies (the party presented its list in the only constituency "Lazio 2").

In the 2013 general election, with Adriano Lotito as candidate, the party presented its list only in Apulia and obtained 0.02% of the vote for the Chamber and the 0.01% for the Senate.

== Party relations ==
The PdAC is affiliated to the International Workers League (Fourth International), a Morenist Trotskyist political international. The party has a very conflicting relationship with the Workers' Communist Party (PCL), another Trotskyist political organization in Italy.

== Electoral results ==
=== Italian Parliament ===
Chamber of Deputies
Election year	Votes	%	Seats	Leader
2008	1,933	0.01	0 / 630	Fabiana Stefanoni
2013	5,196	0.02	0 / 630	Adriano Lotito

Senate of the Republic
Election year	Votes	%	Seats	Leader
2013	5,185	0.02	0 / 315	Adriano Lotito

=== Regional Councils ===
Region	Election year	Votes	%	Seats	+/−
Apulia	2015	3,414	0.21	0 / 51	–
