= Claudio Grassi (politician) =

Italian politician

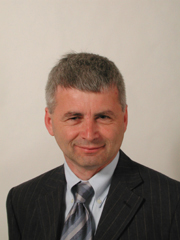

Member of the Senate
- In office 28 April 2006 – 28 April 2008

Personal details
- Born: 12 November 1955 (age 70) Reggio Emilia, Emilia Romagna, Italy
- Party: PCI (until 1991); PRC (1991–2017); SI (since 2017)
- Profession: Politician

Claudio Grassi (born 12 November 1955 in Reggio Emilia) is an Italian politician.

== Biography ==
In 1973 Grassi started working in the factory as a worker, remaining there until 1992. In these years he was a trade union delegate in the CGIL.

In his city, Reggio Emilia, he was promoter of the Italy-Nicaragua Association and of the Association for Peace and was also responsible for cultural activities and vice-president of the Antonio Gramsci club. He was therefore elected municipal councilor for the Italian Communist Party in the municipality of Bibbiano and appointed assessor for culture.

In 1991 he joined the Communist Refoundation Party, of which he became regional secretary in 1993. In 1995 he was elected to the national secretariat of the party, where he remained until 2004, holding the position of national treasurer. In 1998, Grassi and other executives left the faction of the party's president, Armando Cossutta, opposed to his decision to vote the confidence to the Prodi I Cabinet, by joining the majority of the secretary Fausto Bertinotti with his component, called The Ernesto.

In the VI party congress (2005), founded a new current Being Communists, to support its own motion as an alternative to that of the secretary of the party (Bertinotti).

In 2006 Grassi was elected Senator, but he was not re-confirmed in the 2008 general election. In the 2013 general election he was candidate to the Chamber of Deputies with Civil Revolution, without being elected.

In 2016 he left the Communist Refoundation Party and in 2017 joined the Italian Left, of which he was later appointed president. In 2018 he was again candidate to the Chamber of Deputies among the ranks of LeU.

On 1 June 2019, after the resignation of Nicola Fratoianni as secretary, Grassi was appointed regent leader of Italian Left.
