= Aliberti =

Aliberti is a surname. Notable people with the surname include:

- Gian Carlo Aliberti (also Giancarlo and Giovanni Carlo; 1662–1740), Italian painter
- Giuseppe Aliberti (1901–1956), Italian football manager and former player
- Junior Aliberti (born 1977), Uruguayan footballer
- Lucia Aliberti (born 1957), Sicilian opera singer
- Sophia Aliberti, Greek talk show host
- Sotiria Aliberti or Soteria Aliberty (1847–1929), Greek feminist and educator
