= Sergio Garavini =

Italian politician, writer, and trade unionist (1926–2001)

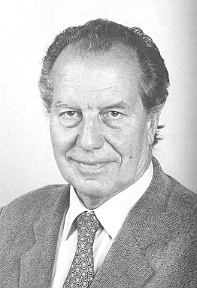
- Garavini in 1994

Member of the Chamber of Deputies
- In office 2 July 1987 – 8 May 1996
- Constituency: Turin (1987–92); Rome (1992–94); Montevarchi (1994–96)

Secretary of the Communist Refoundation Party
- In office 10 February 1991 – 27 June 1993
- Preceded by: Office established
- Succeeded by: Fausto Bertinotti

Personal details
- Born: 18 May 1926 Turin, Italy
- Died: 7 September 2001 (aged 75) Rome, Italy
- Party: PCI (1948–1991); PRC (1991–1995); MCU (1995–1998)
- Occupation: Syndacalist, politician

Sergio Garavini (18 May 1926 – 7 September 2001) was an Italian politician, writer, and trade unionist.

== Life and career ==
Garavini was born in Turin. At a very young age, he entered the Italian Communist Party (PCI) and the trade union Italian General Confederation of Labour (CGIL), which he contributed to reform after the defeat in the FIAT internal elections of 1955. He was subsequently regional secretary of CGIL, secretary of FIOM (CGIL's metallurgic workers confederation) and, finally, national secretary of CGIL. In the trade union conflict between Fausto Bertinotti (who always favoured strikes) and Sergio Cofferati (more incline to mediation), Garavini usually sided for the first policy, but also proposed intermediate solutions such as the intermittent strike or the permanent consultation.

As a member of PCI, he supported Rossana Rossanda when she formed the party-newspaper il manifesto and was later expelled from the party, but Garavini never abandoned it. He was a staunch supporter of the automatic recovery of salaries against inflation, which was introduced thanks to CGIL in 1975. He was elected in the Italian Chamber of Deputies in June 1987, being confirmed in the elections of five years later. When PCI secretary Achille Occhetto proposed to renounce to the party's communist nature and to form the Democratic Party of the Left, Garavini founded, on 15 December 1991, the Communist Refoundation Party, of which he was national secretary until 1993, when he resigned, being replaced by Fausto Bertinotti.

In 1995 Garavini, then a deputy for Communist Refoundation, gave a vote of confidence in the centrist cabinet led by Lamberto Dini, contrary to his party's guidelines. Subsequently, he left to form, together with the party's right wing (including figures such as Lucio Magri and Famiano Crucianelli), the Movement of Unitarian Communists, which in 1998 merged with the Democrats of the Left. Garavini wrote numerous essays on Italian politics and trade unions, such as Ripensare l'illusione. Una prospettiva dalla fine del secolo of 1993. He died in Rome in September 2001.

== Electoral history ==
Election	House	Constituency	Party	Votes	Result
1987	Chamber of Deputies	Turin–Novara–Vercelli	PCI	15,957	Elected
1992	Chamber of Deputies	Rome–Viterbo–Latina–Frosinone	PRC	9,691	Elected
1994	Chamber of Deputies	Tuscany – Montevarchi	PRC	43,514	Elected

== See also ==
- Shadow Cabinet of Italy (1989)

Italian Chamber of Deputies
Preceded by Title jointly held	Member of the Italian Chamber of Deputies; Legislatures; X, XI, XII; 1987–1996	Succeeded by Title jointly held
Party political offices
New political party	Leader of the Communist Refoundation Party; 1991–1994	Succeeded by Fausto Bertinotti
Trade union offices
Preceded by Lina Fibbi	General Secretary of the Italian Federation of Textile and Garment Workers; 1969–1975	Succeeded by Nella Marcellino and Ettore Masucci
Preceded by Pio Galli	General Secretary of the Italian Federation of Metalworkers; 1985–1987	Succeeded by Angelo Airoldi
