= Communist Refoundation Party =

Italian political party

Communist Refoundation Party Partito della Rifondazione Comunista
- Secretary: Maurizio Acerbo
- Founder: Armando Cossutta
- Founded: 6 January 1991 (as the "Committees for the Communist Refoundation"); 12 December 1991 (creation of the Party List)
- Split from: Italian Communist Party
- Headquarters: Via degli Scialoja 3, Rome
- Newspaper: Liberazione (1991–2014); Su la testa (since 2020)
- Youth wing: Young Communists
- Membership (2019): 11,496
- Ideology: Communism
- Political position: Far-left
- National affiliation: See list: AdP (1994–1995); Olive Tree (1996–1998; external support); Union (2004–2008); SA (2008); FdS (2009–2012); RC (2012–2013); AET (2014); PaP (2017–2018); The Left (2019); UP (2022–2024); PTD (2024); Centre-left (2026–present)
- European affiliation: Party of the European Left
- European Parliament group: European United Left–Nordic Green Left (1995–2009, 2014–2019)
- International affiliation: IMCWP
- Colours: Red
- Anthem: The Internationale; Bandiera Rossa
- Chamber of Deputies: 0 / 400
- Senate: 0 / 205
- European Parliament: 0 / 76
- Regional Councils: 0 / 896

Party flag

Website
- home.rifondazione.eu

The Communist Refoundation Party (Italian: Partito della Rifondazione Comunista, abbr. PRC) is a communist political party in Italy that emerged from a split of the Italian Communist Party (PCI) in 1991. The party's secretary is Maurizio Acerbo, who replaced Paolo Ferrero in 2017. Armando Cossutta was the party's founder, while Fausto Bertinotti has been its longest-serving leader (1994–2008). The latter transformed the PRC from a traditional communist party into a collection of radical social movements.

The PRC is a member of the Party of the European Left (PEL), of which Bertinotti was the inaugural president in 2004. The PRC has not been represented in the Italian Parliament since 2008, but had a member of the European Parliament, Eleonora Forenza, who sat with the European United Left–Nordic Green Left (GUE/NGL) group in 2014–2019.

== History ==
=== Foundation and early years ===
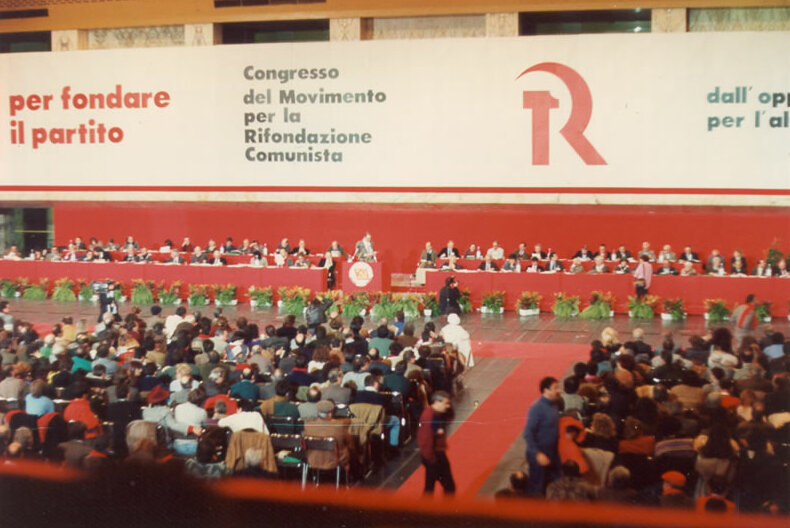
PRC's first congress in 1991

In February 1991, when the Italian Communist Party (PCI) was transformed into the Democratic Party of the Left (PDS) under the leadership of Achille Occhetto, left-wing dissidents led by Armando Cossutta launched the Movement for Communist Refoundation. Hardliners in PCI were not happy about the changes made inside the party after the fall of the Iron Curtain. Later that year, Proletarian Democracy (DP), a far-left party, dissolved itself so that its members could join the PCI dissidents and form a united front composed of all Italian communists. In December, the PRC was officially founded and Sergio Garavini was elected secretary. In the 1992 general election, the party obtained 5.6% of the vote.

Garavini resigned from his role as secretary in June 1993 and was replaced by Fausto Bertinotti, a trade unionist of the Italian General Confederation of Labour (CGIL) who had left the PDS only a few months before. In the 1994 general election, the PRC was part of the PDS-led Alliance of Progressives and obtained 6.1% of the vote. In June 1995, a splinter group led by Lucio Magri and Famiano Crucianelli formed the Movement of Unitarian Communists (MCU), which would eventually merge with the PDS, being one of the founding members of the Democrats of the Left (DS) in February 1998.

=== Bertinotti vs. Cossutta ===
The leadership of Bertinotti was a turning point for the party, which jumped to 8.6% of vote in the 1996 general election, fought by the party in a loose alliance with The Olive Tree, the major centre-left coalition whose dominant partner was the PDS. After the election, the PRC decided to externally support the first cabinet led by Romano Prodi.

Tensions soon arose within the coalition and the party. In October 1998 the PRC was divided between those who wanted to stop supporting Prodi's government, led by Bertinotti; and those who wanted to continue the alliance, led by Cossutta, the party's president. The central committee endorsed Bertinotti's line, but Cossutta and his followers decided to ignore this line and to support Prodi. The votes of the cossuttiani were not enough and the government lost a confidence vote in Parliament.

The dissidents, who controlled the majority of deputies and senators, split and formed a rival communist party, the Party of Italian Communists (PdCI), which would soon join the first cabinet led by Massimo D'Alema, the leader of the DS, who replaced Prodi and became the first post-communist to hold the job of Prime Minister of Italy.

Deprived of most of its parliamentary representation, the PRC fought for its existence and voters supported it rather than the PdCI, both in the 1999 European Parliament election (4.3% to 2.0%) and the 2001 general election (5.0% to 1.7%).

=== Renewal and heyday ===
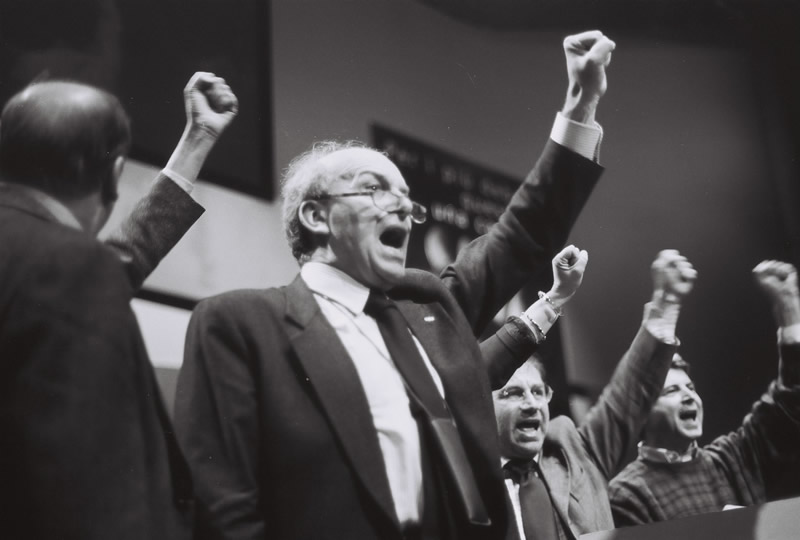
PRC's long-time leader Fausto Bertinotti at a party congress in 1999

Despite competition from the PdCI, the PRC confirmed its status as Italy's largest communist party. Having been left by most traditional communists, it also started to enlarge its scope aiming at becoming a collector of radical social movements and, foremost, the main representative of the anti-globalization movement in Italy. The PRC also forged new alliances at the European level and was instrumental in the foundation of the Party of the European Left in May 2004.

In October 2004, the PRC re-joined the centre-left coalition, once again led by Prodi. In April 2005, Nichi Vendola, an openly gay politician and one of the emerging leaders of the party, won a primary election and was elected president of traditionally conservative southern region of Apulia, becoming the only regional president ever belonging to the PRC.

In the 2006 general election, the PRC was part of The Union, which won narrowly over the centre-right House of Freedoms coalition and the party obtained 5.8%. After the election, Bertinotti was elected President of the Chamber of Deputies and replaced by Franco Giordano as secretary. Additionally, for the first time it entered a government by joining the Prodi II Cabinet, with Paolo Ferrero Minister of Social Solidarity and seven undersecretaries. The decision to participate in the coalition government and vote to refinance the Italian military presence in Afghanistan and send troops to Lebanon attracted criticism from sectors of the European far-left and provoked the splits of several groups from the ranks of his own party, notably including the Workers' Communist Party, the Communist Alternative Party and Critical Left. Prodi, whose majority was weak and fragmented, resigned in January 2008.

=== Crisis, splits and decline ===
For the 2008 general election, the PRC formed a joint list named Rainbow Left (SA) with the PdCI, the Federation of the Greens and the Democratic Left under Bertinotti's leadership. SA obtained a mere 3.1% (compared to 10.2% won by the constituent parties individually two years before) and no seats. Consequently, Bertinotti quit politics and Giordano resigned and after that some bertinottiani, led by Ferrero and Giovanni Russo Spena (both former Proletarian Democracy members), had forged an alliance with former cossuttiani.

At the July 2008 congress, the PRC was highly divided around ideological and regional lines with Vendola, the bertinottiani's standard-bearer, accusing northern delegates of having absorbed leghismo and stating that it was the end of the party as he knew it. The internal left-wing (which wanted to return to PRC's original communist project) finally prevailed over the bulk of bertinottiani (who insisted on the creation of a broader left-wing party) and Ferrero was elected secretary by the central committee with 50.5%.

In January 2009, the faction around Vendola and Giordano, silently supported by Bertinotti, left the PRC and launched the Movement for the Left (MpS), aimed at forming a broader left-wing party, which would eventually be Left Ecology Freedom (SEL).

=== Left-wing alliances ===
In the 2009 European Parliament election the PRC ran with the PdCI and minor groups within the Anticapitalist and Communist List, obtaining 3.4% of the vote and no MEPs. In April 2009 the list was transformed into the Federation of the Left, which would be disbanded by the end of 2012 and officially dissolved in 2015.

In the 2013 general election the PRC ran within Civil Revolution along with the PdCI, the Greens, Italy of Values and minor groups, obtaining 2.2% and no seats. In the 2014 European Parliament election the PRC was part of The Other Europe, which obtained 4.0% of the vote and three MEPs, including PRC's Eleonora Forenza.

In April 2017 Ferrero was replaced as secretary by Maurizio Acerbo, a former member of the Chamber of Deputies.

In the 2018 general election the PRC was part of the Power to the People (PaP) electoral list, which obtained 1.1% of the vote and no seats. In 2020–2021 the party was briefly represented in the Senate by Paola Nugnes, a splinter from the Five Star Movement who later joined Italian Left (SI). In the 2019 European Parliament election the PRC was part of The Left electoral list, which obtained 1.8% and no seats.

In February 2022 the party formed a joint sub-group with PaP in the Chamber of Deputies' Mixed Group. In June 2022 the same happened in the Senate, and senator Nugnes returned to the party. In the run-up of the 2022 general election the PRC was a founding member of the People's Union (UP), a left-wing electoral list led by Luigi de Magistris.

In the run-up of the February 2025 congress the proposition put forward by incumbent secretary Acerbo obtained 50.7% of the vote of party members in local congresses, while a large minority led by Ferrero won 49.3%. As a result, Acerbo was narrowly re-elected secretary.

=== Rapprochement to the centre-left ===
In April 2026, the party's national committee voted to join the centre-left coalition for the next general election. Out of 169 total votes cast, the motion passed with 89 in favor and 80 against. The result reflected a split within the party leadership between those favouring a broad democratic front against the centre-right government, the line proposed by secretary Acerbo, and those opposed to any formal electoral alliance with the centre-left, the line put forward by former secretary Ferrero. In June 2026, thanks to the agreement with the centre-left coalition, Manuel Minervini, a member of PRC, was elected mayor of Molfetta, near Bari.

In October 2026, Andrea Crisanti, a senator from the Democratic Party, left the party's parliamentary group and established a sub-group within the Mixed Group, allowing PRC to run in the upcoming election.

== Factions ==
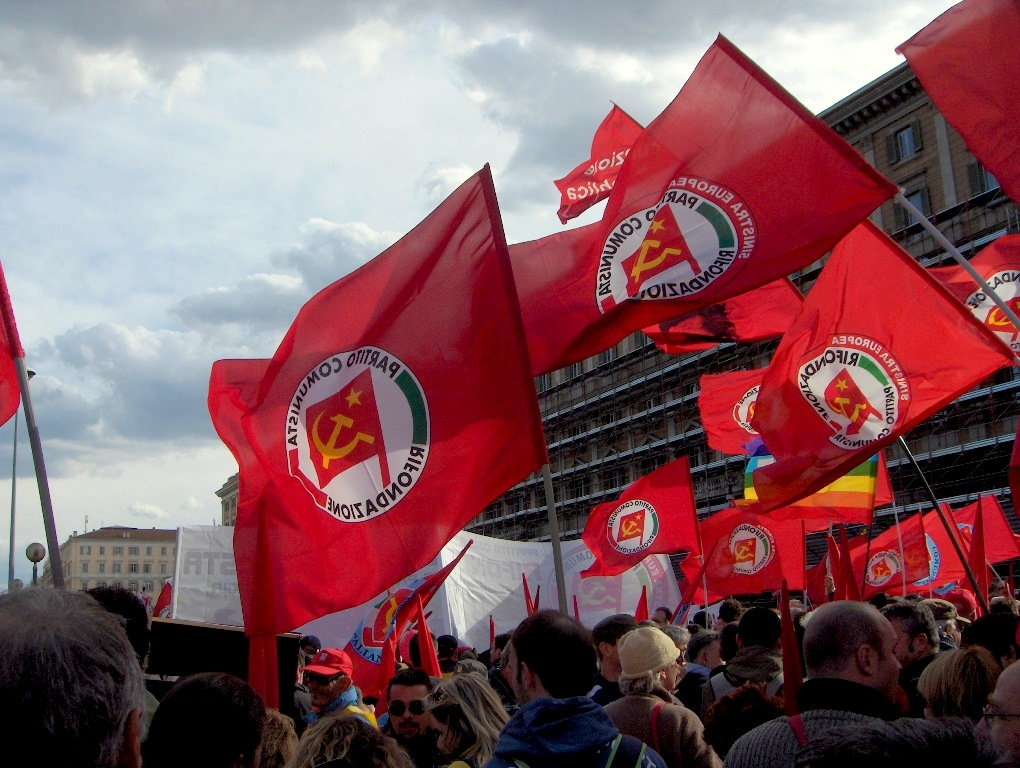
A PRC rally in Rome, 2007

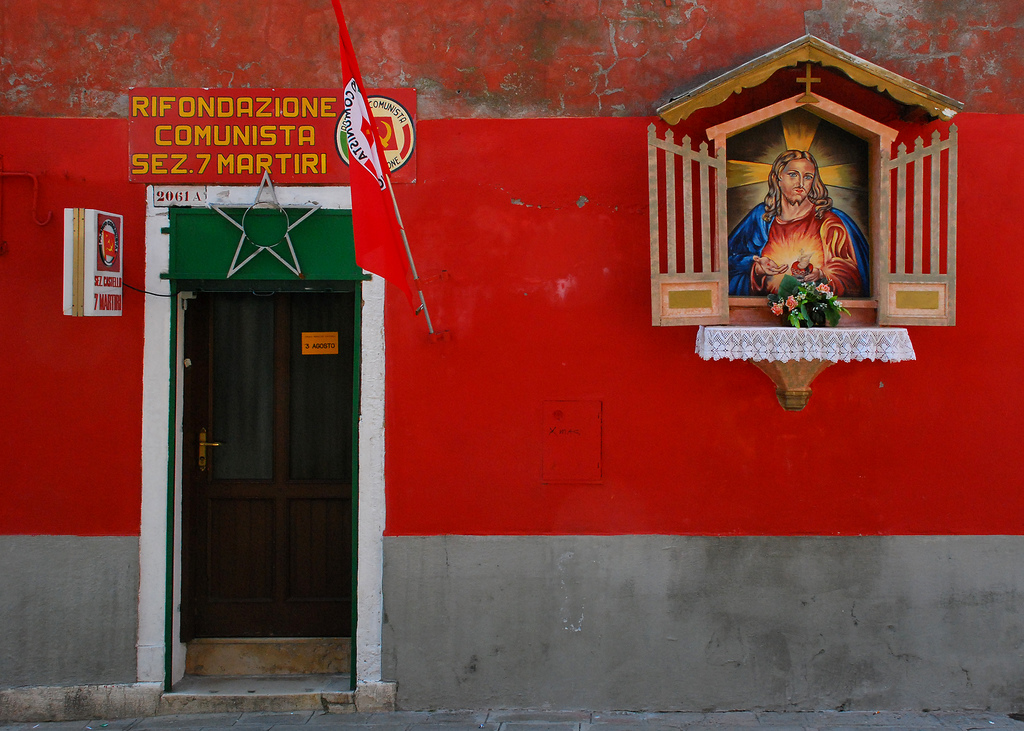
PRC headquarters in Castello, Venice

The majority of the party following the October 2004 congress was led by Fausto Bertinotti (59.2%) and viewed the PRC as the representative of the anti-globalization movement in Italy. Other factions strongly opposed Bertinotti's innovations. These included the hard-line traditionalist Being Communists (26.2%) which was composed of former followers of Armando Cossutta as well as the Trotskyists of Critical Left, Communist Project and HammerSickle (14.6% together). Communist Project, which opposed the party's participation in the Prodi II Cabinet, unfolded shortly after the 2006 general election. A group led by Francesco Ricci established the Communist Alternative Party, others, led by the Trotskyist Marco Ferrando, formed the Workers' Communist Party, while a tiny minority chose to stay in the party and launched Countercurrent.

In February 2007, senator Franco Turigliatto of Critical Left, led by Salvatore Cannavò, voted twice against the government's foreign policy, leading Romano Prodi to temporarily resign from Prime Minister. In April, Turigliatto was expelled from the party and Critical Left was suspended from it, leading to its final split and establishment as a party in December. Turigliatto's ejection was supported also by Claudio Grassi (leader of Being Communists) and this caused a break-up of the faction. A group led by Fosco Giannini launched an alternative faction named The Ernesto (from the eponymous communist publication), but it would suffer the 2008 split of Communist Left, which would splinter in 2011 into Communist Left and Communists Together/The Future City.

Following the severe defeat of the party in the 2008 general election, a group of bertinottiani composed mainly of former members of Proletarian Democracy and led by Paolo Ferrero and Giovanni Russo Spena allied with the other minority factions, notably including Being Communists, to force Franco Giordano's resignation from secretary. Subsequently, in the July congress Ferrero's and Grassi's Refoundation in Movement motion (40.1%) faced the bulk of bertinottiani, who organized themselves around a motion named "Manifesto for the Refoundation" (47.6%) with Nichi Vendola as standard-bearer. Giannini's The Ernesto and Countercurrent (7.7%), Claudio Bellotti's HammerSickle (3.2%) and a minor group of former bertinottiani called "Disarm, Renew, Refound" (1.5%) joined forces with the Ferrero-Grassi group. Vendola, defeated by Ferrero, announced the creation of a new minority faction, Refoundation for the Left (RpS).

RpS finally left the party in 2009 to form the Movement for the Left (MpS), but some of its members, led by Augusto Rocchi, decided to stay in the PRC and launched To the Left with Refoundation. However, the alliance between Ferrero and the traditionalists did not last. The Ernesto joined the PdCI in 2011 while Being Communists divided in two groups, both eventually quitting the party. One group joined SEL in 2014 and was later merged into the Democratic and Progressive Movement (MDP) in 2016; a second, larger group (including Grassi) participated in the foundation of SEL's successor, Italian Left (SI). Indeed, between 2014 and 2016 all of Being Communists quit the PRC and finally ended in SI. In early 2016 the Trotskyist Left Class Revolution left the party too, while Countercurrent seemed no longer active.

In the 2017 congress, two motions were presented by Ferrero and Eleonora Forenza, respectively. The coalition of factions led by Ferrero prevailed with the vote of 71.5% of party members. Consequently, Maurizio Acerbo, supported by Ferrero, was elected secretary by the central committee.

== Popular support ==
The electoral results of the PRC in general (Chamber of Deputies) elections and European Parliament elections since 1994 are shown in the chart below. The 2008 result refers to that of The Left – The Rainbow, a joint list comprising the Party of Italian Communists, Democratic Left and the Federation of the Greens. After that, the party formed joint lists with the Party of Italian Communists. The 2014 result refers to that of The Other Europe, a joint list led by Left Ecology Freedom.

View source data.

The electoral results of the PRC in the ten most populated regions of Italy are shown in the table below.

	1994 general	1995 regional	1996 general	1999 European	2000 regional	2001 general	2004 European	2005 regional	2006 general	2008 general	2009 European	2010 regional	2013 general	2014 European
Piedmont	5.9	9.3	10.3	4.6	5.5	5.9	6.6	6.4	5.9	3.4	3.3	2.6	2.1	4.1
Lombardy	5.1	7.7	6.8	4.0	6.4	5.0	5.6	5.7	5.5	2.9	2.7	2.0	1.6	3.5
Veneto	4.4	5.0	5.3	2.8	3.0	3.9	3.9	3.5	3.9	2.2	1.8	1.6	1.3	2.8
Emilia-Romagna	6.6	7.6	8.3	5.0	5.8	5.5	6.3	5.7	5.6	3.0	3.1	2.8	1.9	4.1
Tuscany	10.1	11.1	12.5	7.4	6.7	6.9	9.1	8.2	8.2	4.5	5.1	5.3	2.7	5.1
Lazio	6.6	9.2	10.4	4.9	5.4	5.2	7.1	5.9	7.4	3.3	3.7	2.7	2.6	4.7
Campania	6.9	9.2	9.1	4.0	3.8	4.8	6.0	4.1	6.1	2.7	3.8	1.6	2.6	3.8
Apulia	7.0	8.1	7.5	3.3	3.6	4.7	6.0	5.1	5.7	3.0	3.3	3.3	2.4	4.3
Calabria	9.3	8.7	10.0	4.3	3.0	3.4	5.8	5.1	6.0	3.2	6.7	4.0	2.9	4.2
Sicily	–	4.3 (1996)	7.0	2.2	2.4 (2001)	3.2	3.6	– (2006)	3.2	2.6	2.2	4.9 (2008)	3.4	3.6

== Election results ==
=== Italian Parliament ===
Election	Leader	Chamber of Deputies				Senate of the Republic			
Election	Leader	Votes	%	Seats	+/–	Votes	%	Seats	+/–
1992	Sergio Garavini	2,202,574	5.6	35 / 630	New	2,163,317	6.5	20 / 315	New
1994	Fausto Bertinotti	2,334,029	6.0	39 / 630	▲4	Into AdP		18 / 315	▼2
1996	Fausto Bertinotti	3,215,960	8.5	35 / 630	▼4	934,974	2.9	11 / 315	▼7
2001	Fausto Bertinotti	1,868,659	5.0	11 / 630	▼24	1,708,707	5.0	5 / 315	▼6
2006	Fausto Bertinotti	2,229,604	5.8	41 / 630	▲30	2,518,624	7.4	27 / 315	▲22
2008	Fausto Bertinotti	Into SA		0 / 630	▼41	Into SA		0 / 315	▼27
2013	Paolo Ferrero	Into RC		0 / 630	0	Into RC		0 / 315	0
2018	Maurizio Acerbo	Into PaP		0 / 630	0	Into PaP		0 / 315	0
2022	Maurizio Acerbo	Into UP		0 / 400	0	Into UP		0 / 200	0

=== European Parliament ===
Election	Leader	Votes	%	Seats	+/–	EP Group
1994	Fausto Bertinotti	1,991,977 (6th)	6.08	5 / 87	New	EUL
1999	Fausto Bertinotti	1,330,341 (4th)	4.27	4 / 87	▼1	GUE/NGL
2004	Fausto Bertinotti	1,971,700 (7th)	6.06	5 / 78	▲1	GUE/NGL
2009 (Note: Run in a joint list with PdCI.)	Paolo Ferrero	1,038,247 (6th)	3.39	0 / 72	▼5	–
2014	Paolo Ferrero	Into AET		1 / 73	▲1	GUE/NGL
2019	Maurizio Acerbo	Into LS		0 / 76	▼1	–
2024	Maurizio Acerbo	Into PTD		0 / 76	0	–

=== Regional Councils ===
Region	Election year	Votes	%	Seats	+/−
Lombardy	2023	39,913 (11th) (Note: Into People's Union.)	1.4	0 / 80	–
South Tyrol	2018	into United Left		0 / 35	–
Trentino	2023	1,088 (23rd)	0.5	0 / 35	–
Veneto	2025	into Peace Health Work		0 / 51	–
Emilia-Romagna	2024	into Emilia-Romagna for Peace, Environment and Labour		0 / 50	–
Tuscany	2025	into Red Tuscani		0 / 41	–
Marche	2025	into Peace Health Work		0 / 31	–
Lazio	2023	10,289 (14th)	0.7	0 / 51	–
Campania	2025	into Popular Campania		0 / 51	–
Apulia	2020	into The Other Apulia		0 / 51	–
Basilicata	2019	into Possible Basilicata		0 / 21	–
Sicily	2017	into 100 Steps for Sicily		0 / 70	–
Sardinia	2024	4,534 (23rd)	0.7	0 / 60	–

== Symbols ==
1991–1998

1999–2004

2004–2011

2011–present

== Leadership ==
=== Secretary ===
Sergio Garavini	10 February 1991 – 27 June 1993	2 years, 137 days
Fausto Bertinotti	22 January 1994 – 6 May 2006	12 years, 104 days
Franco Giordano	7 May 2006 – 27 July 2008	2 years, 81 days
Paolo Ferrero	27 July 2008 – 2 April 2017	8 years, 249 days
Maurizio Acerbo	2 April 2017 – present	9 years, 207 days

=== President ===
Armando Cossutta	12 December 1991 – 11 October 1998	6 years, 303 days (Note: Office abolished)

=== Coordinator ===
Walter De Cesaris	2004–2008
Nando Mainardi	2014–2017
Stefano Galieni	2017–present

=== Leaders in the Italian Parliament ===
Chamber of Deputies		Senate of the Republic	
Lucio Magri	1992–1994	Lucio Libertini	1992–1993
Famiano Crucianelli	1994–1995	Ersilia Salvato	1993–1995
Oliviero Diliberto	1995–1998	Fausto Marchetti	1995–1996
Oliviero Diliberto	1995–1998	Luigi Marino	1996–1998
Franco Giordano	1998–2006	Giovanni Russo Spena	1998–2001
Franco Giordano	1998–2006	Giorgio Malentacchi	2001–2002
Franco Giordano	1998–2006	Luigi Malabarba	2002–2006
Gennaro Migliore	2006–2008	Giovanni Russo Spena	2006–2008

=== Leader in the European Parliament ===
Luigi Vinci	19 July 1994 – 19 July 2004
Roberto Musacchio	14 June 2004 – 13 July 2009
Eleonora Forenza	1 July 2014 – 1 July 2019
