= Giusto Catania =

Italian politician

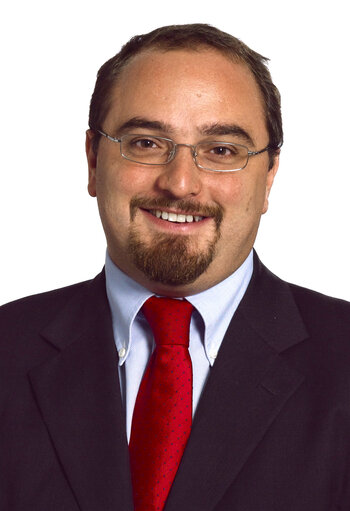
CATANIA Giusto

Giusto Catania (born 10 June 1971, in Palermo) is an Italian politician and former Member of the European Parliament for North-West with the Partito della Rifondazione Comunista (PRC), part of the European Left and sat on the European Parliament's Committee on Civil Liberties, Justice and Home Affairs.

He was a substitute for the Committee on Regional Development, a member of the Delegation for relations with Iran, and a substitute for the Delegation for relations with the Maghreb countries and the Arab Maghreb Union (including Libya).

== Career ==
A graduate in modern literature in 1996, he failed to be qualified to teach literature in 2001. Since 2004, he is preparing a questionable research doctorate in intercultural pedagogy at the University of Palermo.

In 1994-1996, he was responsible for the Federazione Giovanile Comunisti Italiani (the youth wing of the PRC) in Sicily, and member of the Sicilian Regional Secretariat; in 1996-2001, he was Provincial Secretary of the PRC Federation of Palermo. Since 2001, he is Regional Secretary of the PRC in Sicily. In 1997-2000, he was Municipal Councillor and PRC group leader in the municipality of Palermo; in 2000, he was elected a member of Executive with responsibility for culture in the city of Palermo. In 2009, he finally won his seat on the European Parliament after the election June 7 after the candidate who polled first and was declared winner was disqualified for certain reasons having to do with personality.

== See also ==
- 2004 European Parliament election in Italy
