= Liberazione (newspaper) =

Defunct Italian newspaper (1991–2014)

- Type: Daily newspaper
- Format: Compact
- Owner: Communist Refoundation Party
- Founded: 11 October 1991 (weekly); 8 April 1995 (daily)
- Ceased publication: January 2012 (print edition); 19 March 2014 (online edition)
- Political alignment: Communism; Left-wing politics
- Headquarters: Rome, Italy
- Website: www.liberazione.it

Liberazione was an Italian left-wing newspaper that was in circulation between 1991 and 2012. It was published online in the period 2012–2014. The paper was based in Rome, Italy, and was the official newspaper of the Italian Communist Refoundation Party.

== History and profile ==
The paper was founded in 1991 as the official newspaper of the Communist Refoundation Party.

A satirical magazine, Frigidaire, became the supplement of the paper on 25 April 2009.

In 2011 the circulation of Liberazione was about 11,000 copies. In January 2012 the print edition folded, and the paper became online-only publication. The online edition of the newspaper was also closed on 19 March 2014.
