= The Left – The Rainbow =

The Left – The Rainbow La Sinistra – L'Arcobaleno
- Leader: Fausto Bertinotti
- Founded: 8 December 2007
- Dissolved: May 2008
- Ideology: Communism; Democratic socialism Green politics
- Political position: Left-wing to far-left

The Left – The Rainbow (Italian: La Sinistra – L'Arcobaleno, SA), frequently referred as Rainbow Left (Italian: Sinistra Arcobaleno), was a left-wing federation of parties in Italy that participated in the 2008 general election.

== History ==
The federation was officially launched on 8–9 December 2007 with the goal of uniting Italian communist, socialist and ecologist parties in a united bloc, somewhat similar to what the centre-left forces have done with the Democratic Party and before that The Olive Tree.

The four parties tended to disagree on a number of issues, including the support for the Prodi II Cabinet, the symbol and the name of the federation, with the Greens wanting the word "ecologist" and the Italian Communists the hammer and sickle to be included, but in the end they formed a joint list for the 2008 general election.

In the election The Left – The Rainbow gained a disastrous 3.1% of the vote (down from 10.2%, combined result of the three parties in 2006 general election) and failed to gain any seats in the Italian Parliament. Shortly after, the Party of Italian Communists announced it would leave the federation, and the Communist Refoundation Party did the same soon after. These groups went on to launch the Anticapitalist and Communist List, which later became the Federation of the Left. Meanwhile, the Greens and Democratic Left, together with the Socialist Party, Movement for the Left and Unite the Left, formed Left Ecology Freedom.

== Composition ==
The federation, defined by its members as the sinistra radicale (which can be translated in English as both "radical left" and "far left"), was composed of four parties:

Party	Ideology	Leader
Communist Refoundation Party (PRC)	Communism	Franco Giordano
Party of Italian Communists (PdCI)	Communism	Oliviero Diliberto
Federation of the Greens (FdV)	Green politics	Alfonso Pecoraro Scanio
Democratic Left (SD)	Democratic socialism	Fabio Mussi

== Electoral results ==
=== Italian Parliament ===
Chamber of Deputies
Election year	# of overall votes	% of overall vote	# of overall seats won	+/–	Leader
2008	1,124,298 (#6)	3.08	0 / 630	–	Fausto Bertinotti

Senate of the Republic
Election year	# of overall votes	% of overall vote	# of overall seats won	+/–	Leader
2008	1,053,228 (#6)	3.21	0 / 315	–	Fausto Bertinotti
