= Nichi Vendola =

Italian writer and politician

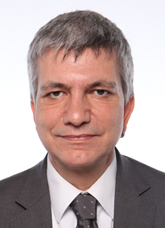

President of Italian Left
- Incumbent
- Assumed office 26 November 2023
- Preceded by: Maria Gabriella Branca

President of Apulia
- In office 27 April 2005 – 26 June 2015
- Preceded by: Raffaele Fitto
- Succeeded by: Michele Emiliano

Member of the Chamber of Deputies
- In office 15 March 2013 – 16 April 2013
- Constituency: Apulia
- In office 23 April 1992 – 3 May 2005
- Constituency: Bari-Foggia (1992–1994); Bitonto (1994–1996); Apulia (1996–2005)

Personal details
- Born: 26 August 1958 (age 68) Bari, Italy
- Party: Italian Left
- Other political affiliations: PCI (1972–1991); PRC (1991–2009); SEL (2009–2017)
- Domestic partner: Edward Testa (since 2004)
- Education: University of Bari
- Profession: Politician, journalist, writer

Nicola "Nichi" Vendola (Italian pronunciation: [ˈniːki ˈvɛndola]; born 26 August 1958) is an Italian left-wing politician and LGBT activist who was a Member of the Chamber of Deputies from Apulia from 1992 to 2005 and President of Apulia from 2005 to 2015. Since 2023, he has been the President of the Italian Left. He is one of the first openly LGBT Italian politicians and the first openly LGBT heads of a regional government in Italy.

== Early life ==
Born in Terlizzi, in the province of Bari, on 26 August 1958, Vendola was a member of the Italian Communist Youth Federation from the age of fourteen. He went on to study literature at his university, presenting a dissertation on the poet and film director Pier Paolo Pasolini.

Vendola became a journalist for l'Unità. He came out as gay in 1978, and became an activist and a leading member of the Italian gay organisation Arcigay. A member of the National Secretariat of the Italian Communist Party, he fiercely opposed the dissolution of the party proposed by Achille Occhetto in 1991. This led to the formation of the Democratic Party of the Left. Vendola instead joined the Communist Refoundation Party.

== Political career ==
=== Member of Parliament ===
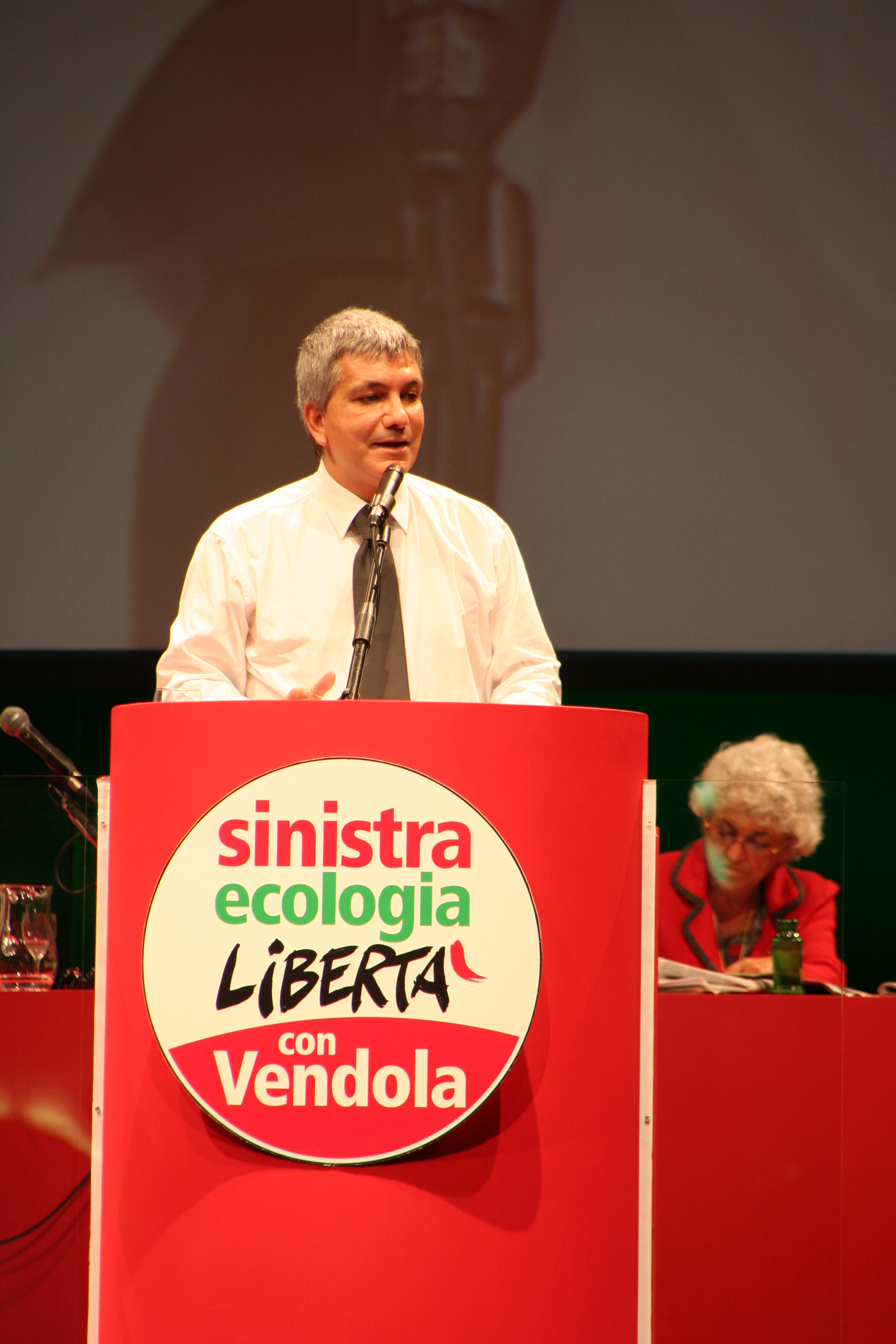
Vendola during a SEL meeting

In 1992, Vendola was elected to the Chamber of Deputies, a seat which he held until 2005. As a member of the Antimafia Commission, he came to prominence as a strong opponent of the Mafia and organised crime.

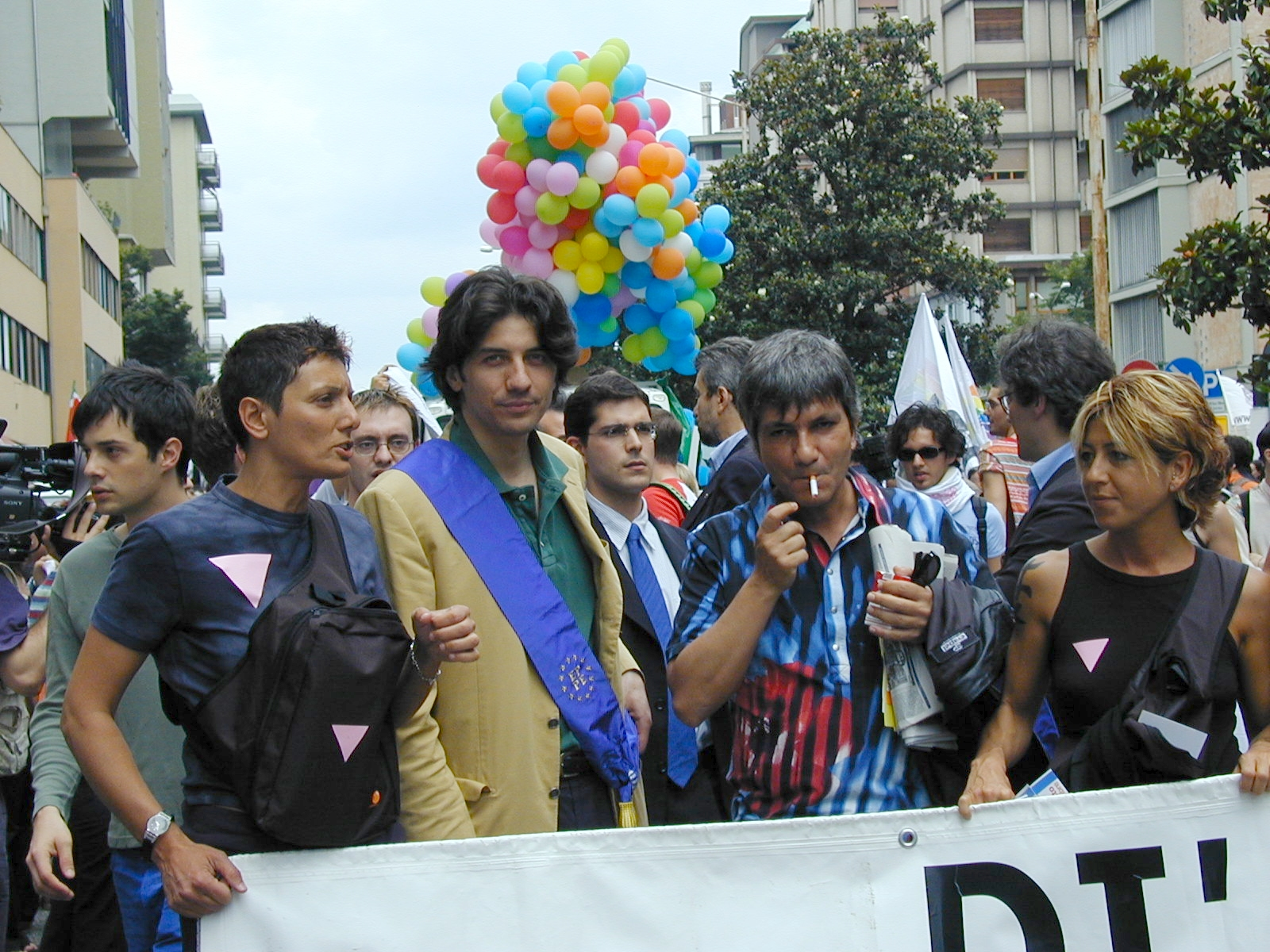
Nichi Vendola participates at the Padua Pride 2002 with Imma Battaglia and Marco Cappato

In 2005, Vendola ran for the first primary election ever held in Italy, held by the centre-left coalition The Union to choose their candidate for the presidency of the Apulia region. He won the primary over the rival Francesco Boccia. Many moderates in the alliance criticised the choice, since it appeared impossible that a communist homosexual could be elected president of a southern Italian region such as Apulia, generally considered to be conservative and strongly Catholic. Vendola identifies as a "believer" (in the line of Pax Christi): he once said that "the most important book for a communist like me is the Bible".

=== President of Apulia ===
In the regional election in Apulia, held in April 2005, he narrowly defeated the incumbent president Raffaele Fitto, candidate for the centre-right coalition the House of Freedoms. He was the first member of the Communist Refoundation Party to be elected as president of any Italian region.

In the July 2008 party congress, Vendola was one of the two major candidates running for the place of Chairman of the Communist Refoundation party; he lost to an alliance led by the other major candidate, Paolo Ferrero, formerly Minister for Social Solidarity in the Prodi II Cabinet. Following the defeat, Vendola's supporters have renounced all positions as party executives.

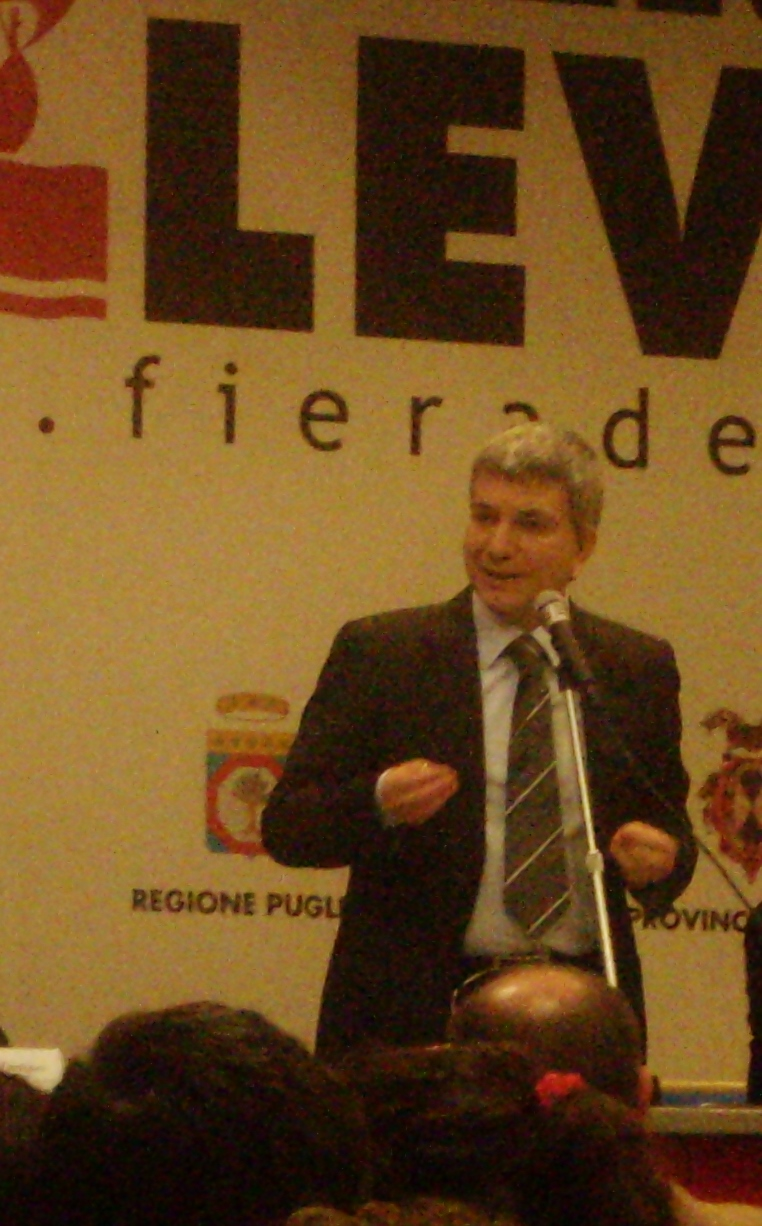
Nichi Vendola in Bari in 2009

On 24 January 2009, at Chianciano Terme, Vendola split from Communist Refoundation and founded the Movement for the Left. In December 2009, Vendola became the first leader of the newly founded party Left Ecology Freedom, which the Movement for the Left had merged into.

In late 2009, his candidacy for re-election was questioned by his centre-left allies from the Democratic Party. They asked him to step down to allow the choice of a candidate able to achieve wider support from other political parties, namely the Christian-democratic Union of the Centre. After Vendola refused to step down, the chances of having a new primary election quickly increased.

After some weeks of heated debate, elections were called for 24 January 2010. Supported by the Democratic Party, Francesco Boccia ran as Vendola's challenger. Vendola easily won the election with more than 67% of the votes, was picked again as leader of the centre-left coalition, and went on to defeat centre-right candidate Rocco Palese by a wide margin.

In July 2010, during a general congress of the so-called "Factories of Nichi", Vendola announced his candidacy for the Primary Elections of the Italian centre-left. This voting was expected to foreshadow what might be expected in the 2013 Italian general elections. Nationwide polls showed Vendola winning over either Democratic Party Secretary Pier Luigi Bersani or Silvio Berlusconi, then Prime Minister of Italy. But came third in the primaries held on 25 November 2012 Vendola ranked third among the 5 candidates with 485,689 votes totaling 15.6%, failing to access the ballot.

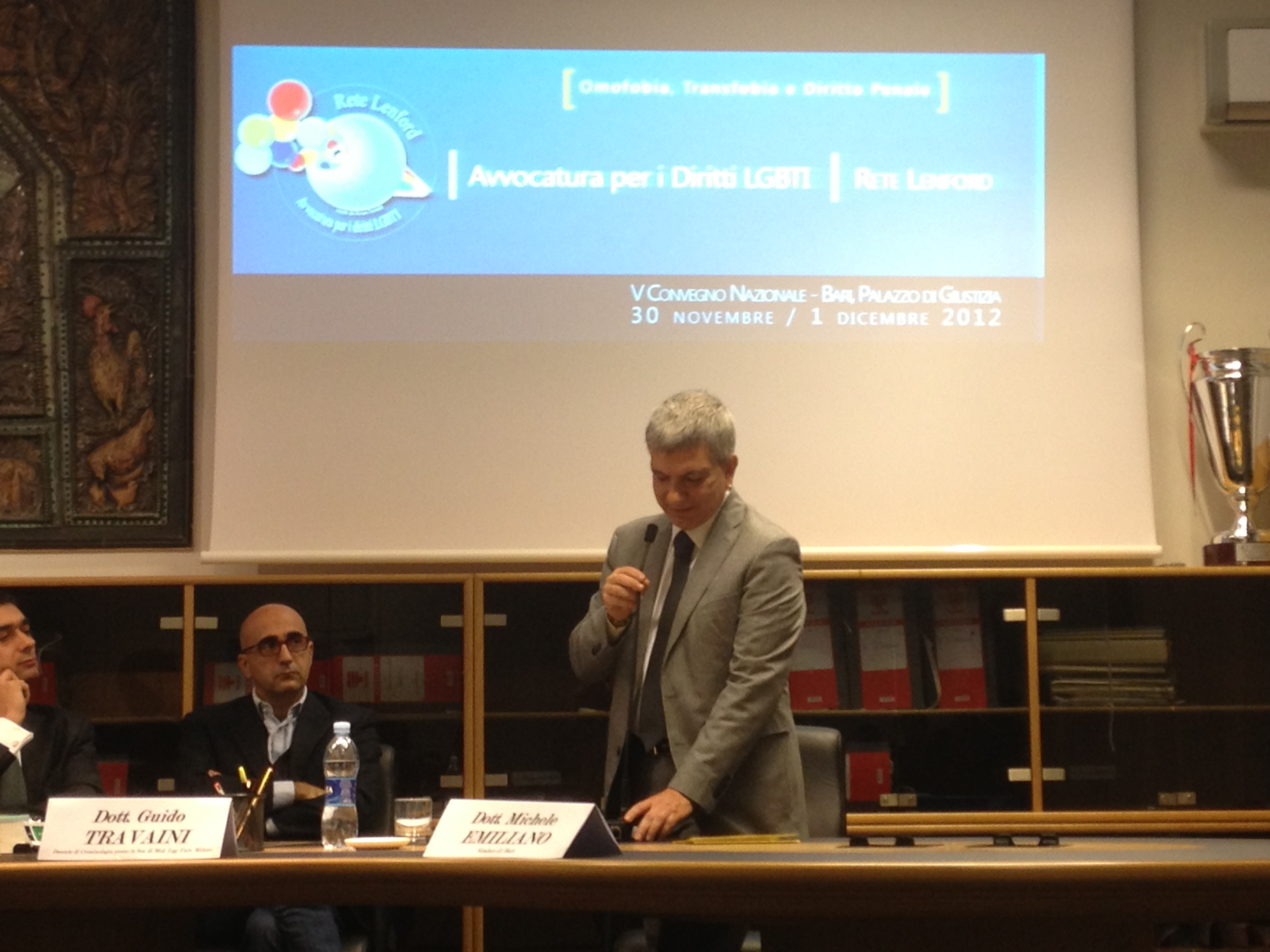
Nichi Vendola giving a speech at an LGBTI rights conference in 2012

In the general election of 2013 Vendola was the candidate of Apulia for the Chamber of deputies, being elected for the 5th time. On 6 March 2013, however, he announced that he would remain in charge of the Puglia Region, thus renouncing the seat in the Chamber. On 10 April 2013 he formalized his resignation as a deputy.

Unable to apply for a third time as president of the region, in 2015 Vendola supported the former mayor of Bari Michele Emiliano who would go on to win the election with 47% of the votes.

=== President of Italian Left ===
On 17 December 2016, Left Ecology Freedom (SEL) was dissolved and merged with the Italian Left, on 19 February 2017. Since 26 November 2023, he has been the president of Sinistra Italiana.

In May 2021, Vendola was sentenced to 3.5 years in prison, due to involvement in the Ilva scandal. He said he had been "condemned without a shred of evidence" and that he would appeal the ruling.

== Homophobic insults ==
During his political career, he received insults related to his homosexuality. In 2012 he was insulted by Luigi Marattin, a member of the municipal government of Ferrara affiliated with the centre-left Democratic Party. In October 2013 Alessandro Morelli, leader of the Lega Nord at the comune of Milan, published an image of Vendola on Facebook with the words "Gay and paedophile". Morelli apologized the next day.

== Personal life ==
Vendola has lived with his partner Edward "Ed" Testa (an Italian-Canadian from Montreal) since 2004. In 2016, the couple used surrogacy in California to have a baby, Tobia Antonio. Vendola is also a poet: some of his poems have been collected in a book, named L'ultimo mare ("The last sea"). His figure has inspired a biographical film, Nichi. Vendola is a devout Roman Catholic, although he opposes many of the church's social positions.

On 17 October 2018, Vendola had a heart attack, but he is in no danger after being fitted with a stent at Rome's Gemelli Hospital.

== Electoral history ==
Election	House	Constituency	Party	Votes	Result	Notes
1987	Chamber of Deputies	Rome–Viterbo–Latina–Frosinone	PCI	10,764	Not elected	
1992	Chamber of Deputies	Bari–Foggia	PRC	5,448	Elected	
1994	Chamber of Deputies	Bitonto	PRC	26,903	Elected	
1996	Chamber of Deputies	Apulia	PRC	– (Note: Elected in a closed list proportional representation system.)	Elected	
2001	Chamber of Deputies	Apulia	PRC	–	Elected	
2013	Chamber of Deputies	Apulia	SEL	–	Elected	

== See also ==
- List of the first LGBT holders of political offices
- List of LGBT heads of government
