= Franco Giordano =

Italian politician

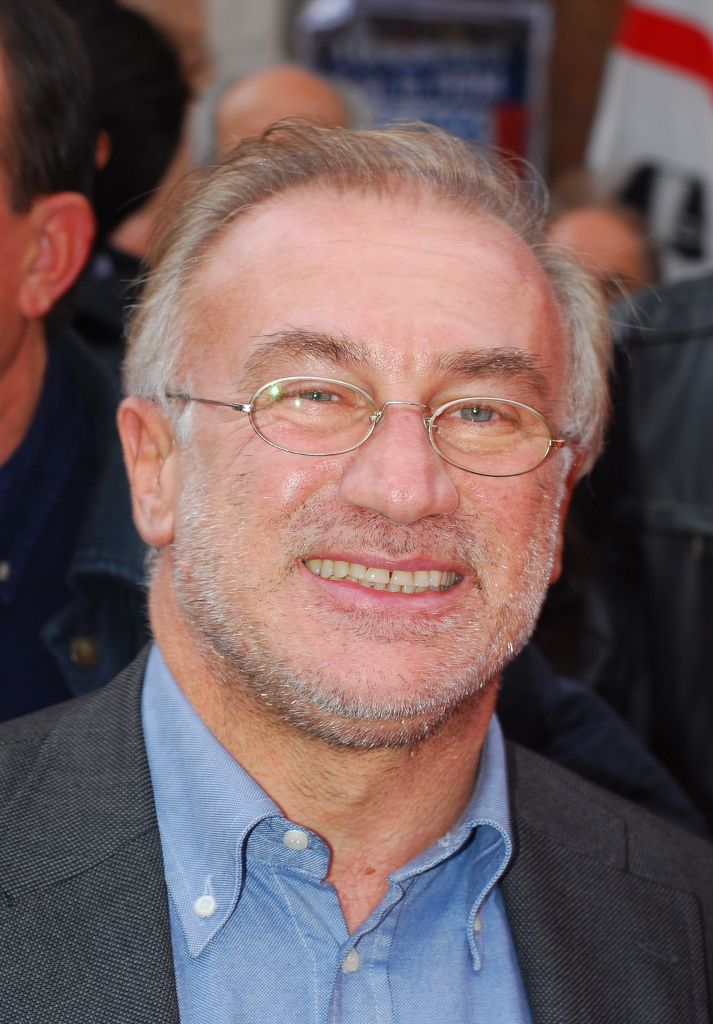
- Giordano in 2010

Secretary of the Communist Refoundation Party
- In office 7 May 2006 – 27 July 2008
- Preceded by: Fausto Bertinotti
- Succeeded by: Paolo Ferrero

Member of the Chamber of Deputies
- In office 9 May 1996 – 28 April 2008

Personal details
- Born: 26 August 1957 (age 68) Bari, Italy
- Party: PCI (1974–1991); PRC (1991–2009); SEL (since 2009)
- Profession: Politician

Francesco "Franco" Giordano (born 26 August 1957) is an Italian politician.

Born in Bari, he became a member of the Italian Communist Party in 1974. From 1985 to 1987 he was member of the national leadership of Federation of Young Italian Communists, and, from 1987 to 1991, of the local PCI leadership of the province of Bari. When the latter was turned into the more social democratic-oriented Democratic Party of the Left, Giordano moved to the Communist Refoundation Party (PRC).

In 1992 Giordano became a national leader of PRC and, in 1996, he was elected for the first time at the Italian Chamber of Deputies. His seat was confirmed in the 2001 and 2006 elections.

President of PRC's group of deputies from October 1998, he was named vice-secretary of the party in 2001 by Fausto Bertinotti. After the latter's election as President of the Italian Chamber of Deputies, Giordano became national secretary of PRC on 7 May 2006.
