= Fausto Bertinotti =

Italian politician (born 1940)

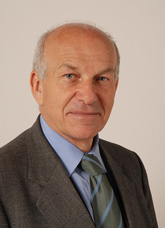
- Official portrait, 2006

President of the Chamber of Deputies
- In office 29 April 2006 – 28 April 2008
- Preceded by: Pier Ferdinando Casini
- Succeeded by: Gianfranco Fini

Secretary of the Communist Refoundation Party
- In office 22 January 1994 – 6 May 2006
- Preceded by: Sergio Garavini
- Succeeded by: Franco Giordano

Member of the European Parliament for North-West Italy
- In office 20 July 1994 – 27 April 2006

Member of the Chamber of Deputies
- In office 15 April 1994 – 28 April 2008
- Constituency: Piedmont

Personal details
- Born: 22 March 1940 (age 86) Milan, Italy
- Party: PSI (1960–1964); PSIUP (1964–1972); PCI (1972–1991); PDS (1991–1993); PRC (1993–2008); Independent (since 2008)
- Spouse: Gabriella Fagno (m. 1965)
- Children: 1
- Profession: Trade unionist; Politician

Fausto Bertinotti (born 22 March 1940) is an Italian politician who led the Communist Refoundation Party (Partito della Rifondazione Comunista) from 1994 to 2006. On 29 April 2006, after the centre-left coalition's victory in the Italian general election, he was elected President of the Chamber of Deputies, a position he held until 2008.

== Trade unionist ==
Bertinotti was born to Enrico Bertinotti, a railroad engineer, and Rosa Bertinotti.

After completing his education in Milan, he joined the CGIL (General Confederation of Italian Labour) in 1964, becoming secretary of the local organisation of the Federazione Italiana degli Operai Tessili (Italian Textile Workers Federation). Three years later, he became president of the labour chamber of Novara. From 1975 to 1985, he was regional secretary of the CGIL in Piedmont. In 1972, he joined the Italian Communist Party (PCI), and soon afterwards became the leader of the most left-wing tendency in the CGIL, called "Essere Sindacato" (to be a union), which harshly criticised the consensus politics of the majority.

In this role, he took part in the great workers' struggles of the time, including that of the Fiat workers, which ended with a 35-day occupation of the car manufacturer's factory. A committed and hardline trade unionist, Bertinotti affirmed the need for the working class to strike against the "injustices of the boss class", thereby attracting the anger of more moderate trade unionists. At that time, he first disagreed with Sergio Cofferati, beginning a polemic which has continued, albeit in different forms, until the present.

In 1994, the year in which he was elected to the secretariat of the Rifondazione Comunista and to the Italian and European parliaments, Bertinotti resigned from all his trade union positions. He remains interested in economics and workers' rights, and has been offered the position of Minister for Labour on several occasions by leaders of the Italian centre-left, but he has always declined it.

== Political career ==
Bertinotti did not readily find a political party during the First Italian Republic that conformed to his principles. He was a member of the Italian Socialist Party and then the Italian Socialist Party of Proletarian Unity before joining the Italian Communist Party, in which he was a member of Pietro Ingrao's tendency. In the PSIUP, he was a member of the internal left wing alongside Vittorio Foa, Lucio Libertini, Asor Rosa and Giacomo Princigalli.

Fausto Bertinotti was opposed to the dissolution of the PCI in 1991 and the creation by its reformist majority of the Democratic Party of the Left (PDS). Nevertheless, he did not immediately join the radical minority in the Partito della Rifondazione Comunista (PRC). He finally broke with PDS leader Achille Occhetto in 1994 and became secretary of the PRC, replacing Sergio Garavini, who had led the party since its foundation.

Bertinotti's accession to the leadership was organised by Armando Cossutta, who probably wished to increase his own prestige and power within the party. In time, however, Bertinotti succeeded in winning over the majority of the party base, aided in this by his charismatic oratory.

He was confirmed in the position of party secretary at the third, fourth, fifth and sixth congresses of Rifondazione. At the last, however, his final document received less support than usual, gaining only 52% of delegates' votes. This close result has led many political commentators to suggest that he may be replaced as secretary of Rifondazione Comunista by Nichi Vendola.

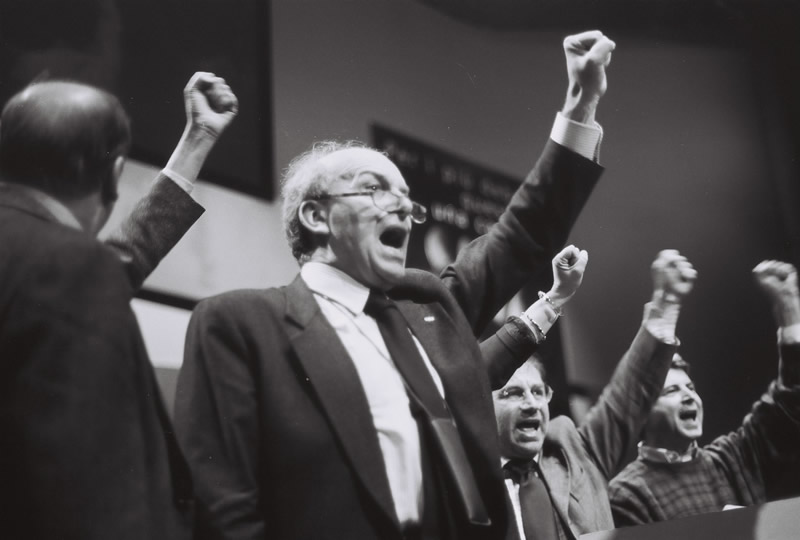
Bertinotti at the PRC Congress in 1999

As an ally of the "progressives" alliance in the 1994 general election, he agreed to the "withdrawal" pact with the Ulivo coalition: Rifondazione would refrain from running candidates in certain electoral districts and advise its voters to support the candidates of the centre-left. The centre-left would reciprocate in other constituencies.

Thanks to this tactic, the Ulivo coalition won the elections in 1996 and Prodi became prime minister. Bertinotti's relationship with the centre-left leader was not an easy one, and in 1998, when Prodi proposed a new budget, incorporating a vote of confidence in his government, Bertinotti and the Rifondazione voted against it, causing the fall of the government. Cossutta's faction refused to vote against the government and left the party. They subsequently established a new party, the Party of Italian Communists (Partito dei Comunisti Italiani, PdCI).

The PRC, weakened by this split, had a poor result in the 1999 European elections, but Bertinotti was nevertheless elected to the European Parliament.

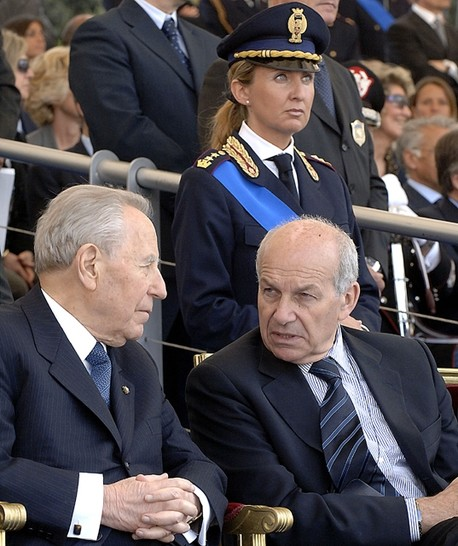
Bertinotti with President Carlo Azeglio Ciampi in May 2006

Since 2001, Bertinotti has led the party to take more radical, mass-movement positions close to those of the growing alternative globalisation movement, a stance which is opposed by the party's Trotskyist factions.

From 2002 on, there has been some reconciliation between Rifondazione and the centre-left. The two tendencies have concluded alliances for both local and European elections in 2004 (in which latter the PRC gained 6.1% of the vote), as well as the regional elections of 2005, in which the centre-left coalition, rechristened L'Unione gained a clear victory. During the 6th national conference held in spring 2005, Bertinotti was the first promoter of a motion for the alliance with Romano Prodi. That decision broke with the traditional attitude of the Italian Communist party to be an opposition movement.

Bertinotti declared himself willing to see Prodi chosen without primary elections as the left's joint candidate for the post of prime minister, but when Prodi accepted that primary elections would be necessary, he proposed himself as a candidate. The elections were held on 16 October 2005 and apart from Bertinotti and Prodi, Antonio Di Pietro, Alfonso Pecoraro Scanio, Clemente Mastella, Ivan Scalfarotto and Simona Panzino were the candidates. Prodi won with an absolute majority, but Bertinotti ranked second with 16% of preferences.

Bertinotti was elected a member of the European Parliament in 2004 on the Rifondazione Comunista list, in which he was a candidate in all five electoral districts, receiving some 380,000 votes in all of Italy. He served as a member of the European Left group in the parliament, sitting on the Committee on Economic and Monetary Affairs. He was a substitute for the Committee on Legal Affairs and a member of the Delegation to the EU-Former Yugoslav Republic of Macedonia Joint Parliamentary Committee.

After the general election held on 9 and 10 April 2006, which saw a narrow victory of The Union, Fausto Bertinotti was elected President of the Chamber of Deputies, and thus left the party leadership, being replaced on 7 May by Franco Giordano. After losing his deputy seat in the 2008 general election, he announced his intention of renouncing to any future leadership positions.

In December 2019 Bertinotti begun a collaboration with the Italian online journal Il Riformista. For the after the COVID-19 pandemic in Italy, Bertinotti suggested the Italian government to adopt a new Keynesianism against the economic recession and a higher level of public expenditure to reabsorb mass disoccupation after the private sectors' collective dismissals.

== Miscellaneous ==
Bertinotti is an icon known to the Italian public for his "aristocratic" public image, mainly conveyed by his French R, his good manners and his elegant sweaters. His fascination with expensive cashmere is also part of his idiosyncrasy. This bourgeois look has often been seen as being in ironic contrast with his far left politics.

On 4 June 2023, he took part as a speaker in a cultural meeting organised by the Grand Orient of Italy at Villa Bertelli (in Forte dei Marmi). On this occasion he presented his book entitled La dissoluzione della democrazia.

== Works ==
Bertinotti has written a number of political, ideological and trade-union related works:

- La Camera dei lavori. Ediesse, Roma, 1987
- La democrazia autoritaria. Datanews, Roma, 1991
- Tutti i colori del rosso (edited by Lorenzo Scheggi Merlini). Sperling & Kupfer, Milan, 1995
- Il nostro nuovo Comunismo (ripartendo da Marx) (edited by Carlo and Norberto Valentini). Carmenta, Milan, 1996
- Le due sinistre (with Alfonso Gianni). Sperling & Kupfer, Milan, 1997
- Pensare il '68 per capire il presente. Con una riflessione sul movimento no global (with Alfonso Gianni). Ponte alle Grazie, Milan, 1998
- Le idee che non muoiono (with Alfonso Gianni). Ponte alle Grazie, Milan, 2000
- Per una pace infinita (with Alfonso Gianni). Ponte alle Grazie, Milan, 2002
- Nonviolenza it:Nonviolenza. Le ragioni del pacifismo, (with Lidia Menapace e Marco Revelli). Fazi, Milan, 2004
- Il ragazzo con la maglietta a strisce (with Wilma Labate). Aliberti, Milan, 2005

== Electoral history ==
Election	House	Constituency	Party	Votes	Result
1994	Chamber of Deputies	Turin 4	PRC	32,737	Elected
1994	European Parliament	North-West Italy	PRC	133,337	Elected
1996	Chamber of Deputies	Piedmont 1	PRC	– (Note: Elected in a closed list proportional representation system.)	Elected
1999	European Parliament	North-West Italy	PRC	70,357	Elected
2001	Chamber of Deputies	Piedmont 1	PRC	–	Elected
2004	European Parliament	North-West Italy	PRC	80,418	Elected
2006	Chamber of Deputies	Piedmont 1	PRC	–	Elected

== See also ==
- 2004 European Parliament election in Italy

Party political offices
Preceded by Sergio Garavini	Secretary of the Communist Refoundation Party; 1994–2006	Succeeded by Franco Giordano
Political offices
Preceded by Pier Ferdinando Casini	President of the Italian Chamber of Deputies; 2006–2008	Succeeded by Gianfranco Fini
