= Paolo Ferrero =

Italian politician (born 1960)

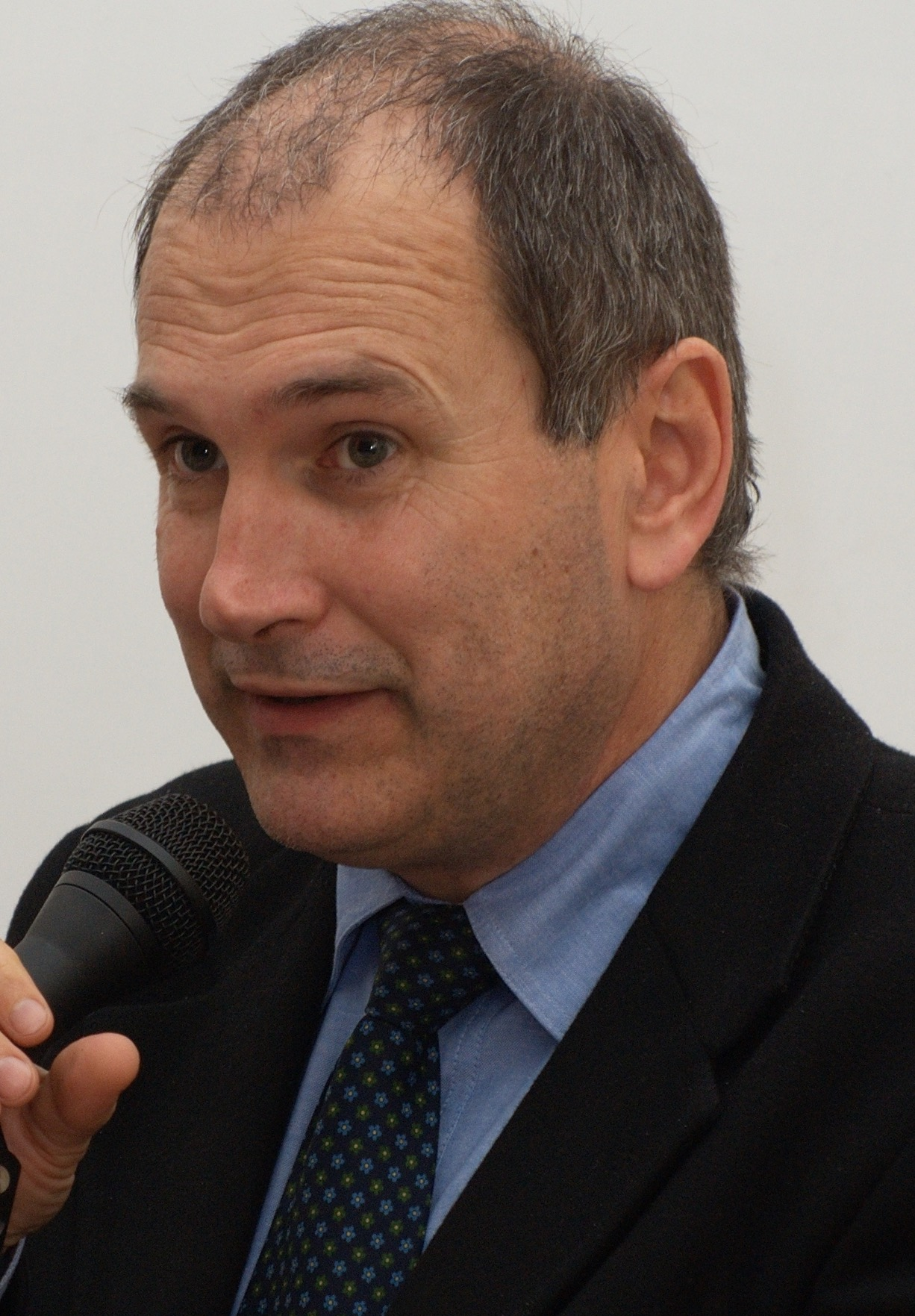
- Ferrero in 2010

Secretary of the Communist Refoundation Party
- In office 27 July 2008 – 2 April 2017
- Preceded by: Franco Giordano
- Succeeded by: Maurizio Acerbo

Minister of Social Solidarity
- In office 17 May 2006 – 8 May 2008
- Prime Minister: Romano Prodi
- Preceded by: Roberto Maroni
- Succeeded by: Maurizio Sacconi

Member of the Chamber of Deputies
- In office 28 April 2006 – 28 April 2008

Personal details
- Born: 17 November 1960 (age 65) Pomaretto, Italy
- Party: DP (1978–1991); PRC (since 1991)

Paolo Ferrero (born 17 November 1960) is an Italian politician. He is a leading member of the Communist Refoundation Party (Partito della Rifondazione Comunista; PRC), and served as Minister of Social Solidarity from 2006 to 2008 as part of the Prodi II Cabinet.

== Career ==
Ferrero was born in Pomaretto, in the province of Turin.

A former FIAT worker, his political commitment began at the age of 17, when he joined Proletarian Democracy (Democrazia Proletaria; DP). Unlike the majority of his party, Ferrero is religious and is a member of the Waldensian Evangelical Church, and was the leader of the youth evangelical Waldensian federation before fully entering politics in 1987. He served as a Turin city councillor from 1993 to 1997, shortly after the DP was absorbed by the PRC. He has two children.

Ferrero was first elected as a Member of Parliament in 2006. Prior to being appointed to Prime Minister Romano Prodi's Cabinet in 2006, he was responsible for the PRC's social, economic and labour department, with a particular focus on social policy, national civil service, non-EU immigrants and drug-related policies.

On 27 July 2008, Ferrero was elected secretary of the PRC, defeating the other major candidate, Nichi Vendola. His term of office came to an end in April 2017.

== Sources ==
- (in Italian) A portrait of Paolo Ferrero (Repubblica.it)
