= Second D'Alema government =

55th government of the Italian Republic

- 55th Cabinet of Italy

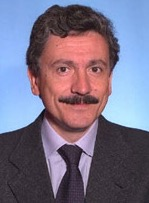
- Date formed: 22 December 1999
- Date dissolved: 26 April 2000 (127 days)

People and organisations
- Head of state: Carlo Azeglio Ciampi
- Head of government: Massimo D'Alema
- Total no. of members: 26 (incl. Prime Minister)
- Member party: DS, PPI, Dem, UDEUR, PdCI, RI, FdV; Abstention: SDI
- Status in legislature: Centre-left coalition
- Opposition party: FI, LN, AN, PRC, CCD, CDU
- Opposition leader: Silvio Berlusconi

History
- Legislature term: XIII Legislature (1996 – 2001)
- Predecessor: First D'Alema government
- Successor: Second Amato government

The second D'Alema government was the government of Italy from 22 December 1999 to 26 April 2000.

Following the exit from the majority of the United Christian Democrats led by Rocco Buttiglione and of the Union for the Republic led by Francesco Cossiga, and in order to allow The Democrats to join the government, Massimo D'Alema resigned and formed a new government. The Italian Democratic Socialists, instead, did not participate to the formation of the government and they decided to abstain in the vote of confidence to the new government.

The government stood in office for only 4 months: after the heavy defeat of The Olive Tree at the 2000 regional elections, D'Alema resigned for an "act of political sensitivity".

The task of forming a new government was entrusted to Giuliano Amato, already minister in the two D'Alema cabinets.

== Party breakdown ==
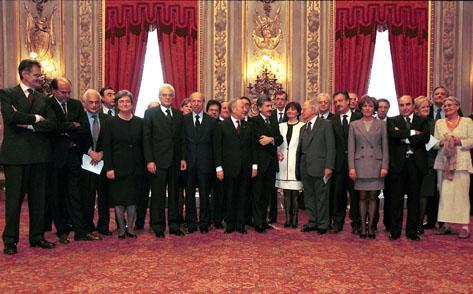
Official photo of the D'Alema's government after the oath at the Quirinal Palace

=== Ministers ===
- Democrats of the Left
9
- Italian People's Party
6
- The Democrats
4
- Union of Democrats for Europe
2
- Party of Italian Communists
2
- Independents
2
- Italian Renewal
1
- Federation of the Greens
1

=== Ministers and other members ===
- Democrats of the Left (DS): Prime minister, 8 ministers and 19 undersecretaries
- Italian People’s Party (PPI): 6 ministers and 14 undersecretaries
- The Democrats (Dem): 4 ministers and 8 undersecretaries
- Union of Democrats for Europe (UDEUR): 2 minister and 5 undersecretaries
- Independents: 2 ministers and 5 undersecretaries
- Party of Italian Communists (PdCI): 2 ministers and 3 undersecretaries
- Italian Renewal (RI): 1 minister and 5 undersecretaries
- Federation of the Greens (FdV): 1 minister and 3 undersecretaries
- Valdostan Union (UV): 1 undersecretary

== Composition ==
Portrait	Office	Name	Term	Party	Undersecretaries
	Prime Minister	Massimo D'Alema	22 December 1999 – 26 April 2000	Democrats of the Left	Enrico Luigi Micheli (PPI); Marco Minniti (DS) (Note: Delegated to information and publishing, the 2000 Jubilee, the CESIS and representing the President of the Council at the COPACO.); Stefano Passigli (DS) (Note: Delegated to technological innovation.)
	Minister of Foreign Affairs	Lamberto Dini	22 December 1999 – 26 April 2000	Italian Renewal	Franco Danieli (DEM); Umberto Ranieri (DS); Rino Serri (DS); Aniello Palumbo (PPI) (since 30 December 1999)
	Minister of the Interior	Enzo Bianco	22 December 1999 – 26 April 2000	The Democrats	Franco Barberi (Ind.); Massimo Brutti (DS); Ombretta Fumagalli Carulli (RI); Severino Lavagnini (PPI); Alberto Maritati (DS)
	Minister of Grace and Justice	Oliviero Diliberto	22 December 1999 – 26 April 2000	Party of Italian Communists	Giuseppe Ayala (DS); Franco Corleone (FdV); Marianna Li Calzi (RI); Rocco Maggi (DEM)
	Minister of Treasury, Budget and Economic Planning	Giuliano Amato	22 December 1999 – 26 April 2000	Independent	Ferdinando De Franciscis (PPI); Dino Piero Giarda (Ind.); Giorgio Macciotta (DS); Roberto Pinza (PPI) (until 30 December 1999); Bruno Solaroli (DS)
	Minister of Finance	Vincenzo Visco	22 December 1999 – 26 April 2000	Democrats of the Left	Natale D'Amico (RI); Alfiero Grandi (DS); Mauro Fabris (UDEUR) (until 30 December 1999); Armando Veneto (PPI) (since 30 December 1999)
	Minister of Defense	Sergio Mattarella	22 December 1999 – 26 April 2000	Italian People's Party	Paolo Guerrini (PdCI); Romano Misserville (UDEUR) (until 30 December 1999); Roberto Pinza (PPI) (since 30 December 1999); Gianni Rivera (DEM); Massimo Ostillio (UDEUR)
	Minister of Public Education	Luigi Berlinguer	22 December 1999 – 26 April 2000	Democrats of the Left	Giuseppe Gambale (DEM); Nadia Masini (DS); Giovanni Polidoro (PPI); Carla Rocchi (FdV)
	Minister of Public Works	Willer Bordon	22 December 1999 – 26 April 2000	The Democrats	Antonio Bargone (Ind.); Mauro Fabris (UDEUR) (since 30 December 1999); Armando Veneto (PPI) (until 30 December 1999); Gianni Francesco Mattioli (FdV); Salvatore Ladu (PPI)
	Minister of Agricultural and Forestry Policies	Paolo De Castro	22 December 1999 – 26 April 2000	The Democrats	Roberto Borroni (DS); Aniello Di Nardo (DEM)
	Minister of Transport and Navigation	Pier Luigi Bersani	22 December 1999 – 26 April 2000	Democrats of the Left	Giordano Angelini (DS); Luca Danese (UDEUR); Mario Occhipinti (DEM)
	Minister of Communications	Salvatore Cardinale	22 December 1999 – 26 April 2000	Union of Democrats for Europe	Vincenzo Maria Vita (DS); Michele Lauria (PPI)
	Minister of Industry, Commerce and Craftsmanship	Enrico Letta	22 December 1999 – 26 April 2000	Italian People's Party	Gabriele Cimadoro (DEM); Lanfranco Turci (DS); Gianfranco Morgando (PPI) (since 30 December 1999); Aniello Palumbo (PPI) (until 30 December 1999)
	Minister of Labour and Social Security	Cesare Salvi	22 December 1999 – 26 April 2000	Democrats of the Left	Claudio Caron (PdCI); Adolfo Manis (RI); Raffaele Morese (Ind.); Rosario Olivo (DS)
	Minister of Foreign Trade	Piero Fassino	22 December 1999 – 26 April 2000	Democrats of the Left	Silvia Barbieri (DS); Gianfranco Morgando (PPI) (until 30 December 1999)
	Minister of Health	Rosy Bindi	22 December 1999 – 26 April 2000	Italian People's Party	Monica Bettoni Brandani (DS); Fabio Di Capua (DS); Antonino Mangiacavallo (RI)
	Minister of Cultural Heritage and Activities	Giovanna Melandri	22 December 1999 – 26 April 2000	Democrats of the Left	Giampaolo D'Andrea (PPI); Maretta Scoca (UDEUR); Adriana Vigneri (DS) (until 30 December 1999)
	Minister of the Environment	Edo Ronchi	22 December 1999 – 26 April 2000	Federation of the Greens	Valerio Calzolaio (DS); Nicola Fusillo (PPI)
	Minister of University, Scientific Research and Technology	Ortensio Zecchino	22 December 1999 – 26 April 2000	Italian People's Party	Antonino Cuffaro (PdCI); Luciano Guerzoni (DS); Vincenzo Sica (DEM)
	Minister for Institutional Reforms (without portfolio)	Antonio Maccanico	22 December 1999 – 26 April 2000	The Democrats	Dario Franceschini (PPI)
	Minister for Equal Opportunities (without portfolio)	Laura Balbo	22 December 1999 – 26 April 2000	Federation of the Greens	
	Minister of Regional Affairs (without portfolio)	Katia Bellillo	22 December 1999 – 26 April 2000	Party of Italian Communists	Luciano Caveri (UV)
	Minister for Parliamentary Relations (without portfolio)	Agazio Loiero	22 December 1999 – 26 April 2000	Union of Democrats for Europe	Elena Montecchi (DS)
	Minister of Public Function (without portfolio)	Franco Bassanini	22 December 1999 – 26 April 2000	Democrats of the Left	Raffaele Cananzi (PPI); Adriana Vigneri (DS) (since 30 December 1999)
	Minister of Social Solidarity (without portfolio)	Livia Turco	22 December 1999 – 26 April 2000	Democrats of the Left	
	Minister of Community Policies (without portfolio)	Patrizia Toia	22 December 1999 – 26 April 2000	Italian People's Party	
