= First D'Alema government =

54th government of the Italian Republic

- 54th Cabinet of Italy

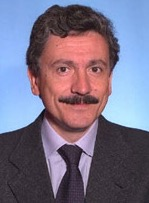
- Date formed: 21 October 1998
- Date dissolved: 22 December 1999 (428 days)

People and organisations
- Head of state: Oscar Luigi Scalfaro; Carlo Azeglio Ciampi
- Head of government: Massimo D'Alema
- No. of ministers: 26 (incl. Prime Minister)
- Ministers removed: 3
- Total no. of members: 29 (incl. Prime Minister)
- Member party: DS, PPI, UDR, RI, PdCI, FdV, SDI
- Status in legislature: Centre-left coalition
- Opposition party: FI, AN, LN, PRC, CCD
- Opposition leader: Silvio Berlusconi

History
- Legislature term: XIII Legislature (1996 – 2001)
- Predecessor: First Prodi government
- Successor: Second D'Alema government

The first D'Alema government was the government of Italy from 21 October 1998 to 22 December 1999.

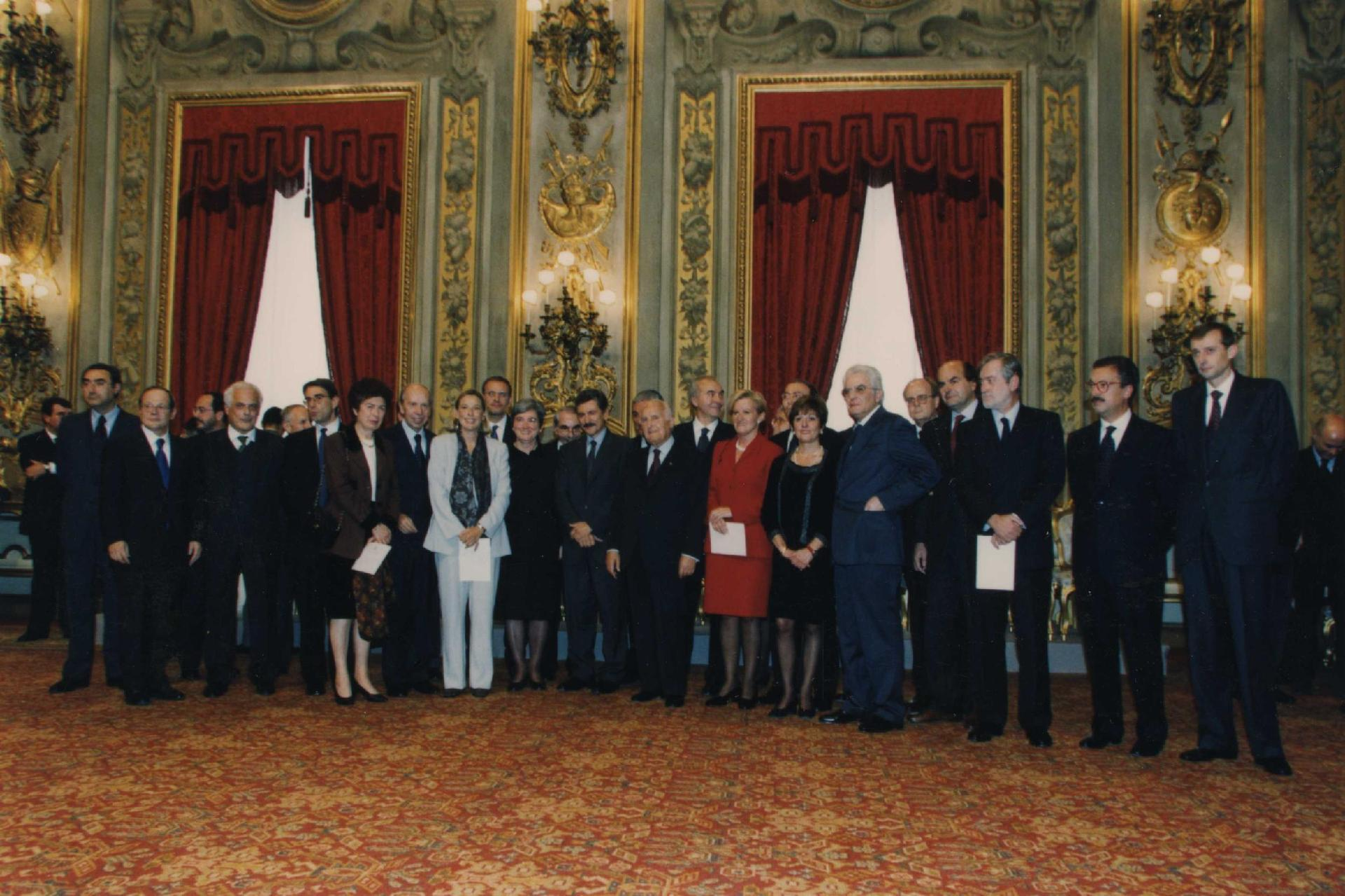
Official photo of the D'Alema's government after the oath at the Quirinal Palace

The first Prodi government fell in 1998 when the Communist Refoundation Party withdrew its support to Prodi. This led to the formation of a new government led by Massimo D'Alema as Prime Minister, the first former Communist to lead a NATO country. As the result of a vote of no confidence in Prodi's government, D'Alema's nomination was passed by a single vote. This was the first and so far, the only occasion in the history of the Italian republic on which a vote of no confidence had ever been called; the Republic's many previous governments had been brought down by a majority "no" vote on some crucially important piece of legislation (such as the budget).

== Crisis and fall ==
In December 1999 the United Democratic Christians (CDU) and the Union for the Republic (UpR) withdrew from the majority and moved to the opposition. D'Alema subsequently resigned and formed a new government soon afterwards.

== Party breakdown ==
=== Ministers ===
- Democrats of the Left
8
- Italian People's Party
5
- Democratic Union for the Republic
3
- Independents
3
- Italian Renewal
2
- Party of Italian Communists
2
- Federation of the Greens
2
- Italian Democratic Socialists
1

=== Ministers and other members ===
- Democrats of the Left (DS): Prime minister, 7 ministers and 22 undersecretaries
- Italian People’s Party (PPI): Deputy Prime minister, 5 ministers and 11 undersecretaries
- Democratic Union for the Republic (UDR): 3 ministers and 8 undersecretaries
- Independents: 3 ministers and 5 undersecretaries
- Italian Renewal (RI): 2 ministers and 5 undersecretaries
- Party of Italian Communists (PdCI): 2 ministers and 3 undersecretaries
- Federation of the Greens (FdV): 2 ministers and 3 undersecretaries
- Italian Democratic Socialists (SDI): 1 minister and 2 undersecretaries

== Composition ==
Portrait	Office	Name	Term	Party	Undersecretaries
	Prime Minister	Massimo D'Alema	21 October 1998 – 22 December 1999	Democrats of the Left	Franco Bassanini (DS); Marco Minniti (DS) (Note: Delegated to information and publishing.)
	Deputy Prime Minister (Note: Delegated to security services.)	Sergio Mattarella	21 October 1998 – 22 December 1999	Italian People's Party	Franco Bassanini (DS); Marco Minniti (DS)
	Minister of Foreign Affairs	Lamberto Dini	21 October 1998 – 22 December 1999	Italian Renewal	Valentino Martelli (UDR); Umberto Ranieri (DS); Rino Serri (DS); Patrizia Toia (PPI)
	Minister of the Interior	Rosa Russo Iervolino	21 October 1998 – 22 December 1999	Italian People's Party	Franco Barberi (Ind.); Alberto La Volpe (SDI); Diego Masi (UDR) (until 10 March 1999); Alberto Gaetano Maritati (DS); Giannicola Sinisi (PPI); Adriana Vigneri (DS)
	Minister of Grace and Justice	Oliviero Diliberto	21 October 1998 – 22 December 1999	Party of Italian Communists	Giuseppe Ayala (DS); Franco Corleone (FdV); Marianna Li Calzi (RI); Maretta Scoca (UDR)
	Minister of Treasury, Budget and Economic Planning	Carlo Azeglio Ciampi	21 October 1998 – 13 May 1999	Independent	Stefano Cusumano (UDR) (until 26 Apr. 1999); Natale D'Amico (RI); Dino Piero Giarda (Ind.); Laura Pennacchi (DS) (until 9 July 1999); Giorgio Macciotta (DS); Roberto Pinza (PPI); Bruno Solaroli (DS) (since 27 Sept. 1999)
	Minister of Treasury, Budget and Economic Planning	Giuliano Amato	13 May 1999 – 22 December 1999	Independent	Stefano Cusumano (UDR) (until 26 Apr. 1999); Natale D'Amico (RI); Dino Piero Giarda (Ind.); Laura Pennacchi (DS) (until 9 July 1999); Giorgio Macciotta (DS); Roberto Pinza (PPI); Bruno Solaroli (DS) (since 27 Sept. 1999)
	Minister of Finance	Vincenzo Visco	21 October 1998 – 22 December 1999	Democrats of the Left	Ferdinando De Franciscis (PPI); Fausto Vigevani (DS); Gian Franco Schietroma (SDI) (since 04 Aug. 1999)
	Minister of Defence	Carlo Scognamiglio	21 October 1998 – 22 December 1999	Democratic Union for the Republic	Fabrizio Abbate (PPI); Massimo Brutti (DS); Paolo Guerrini (PdCI); Gianni Rivera (RI)
	Minister of Public Education	Luigi Berlinguer	21 October 1998 – 22 December 1999	Democrats of the Left	Teresio Delfino (UDR) (until 04 Aug. 1999); Nadia Masini (DS); Carla Rocchi (FdV); Sergio Zoppi (PPI)
	Minister of Public Works	Enrico Luigi Micheli	21 October 1998 – 22 December 1999	Italian People's Party	Antonio Bargone (DS); Mauro Fabris (UDR); Gianni Francesco Mattioli (FdV)
	Minister of Agricultural and Forestry Policies	Paolo De Castro	21 October 1998 – 22 December 1999	Independent	Roberto Borroni (DS); Nicola Fusillo (PPI)
	Minister of Transport and Navigation	Tiziano Treu	21 October 1998 – 22 December 1999	Italian Renewal	Giordano Angelini (DS); Luca Danese (UDR)
	Minister of Communications	Salvatore Cardinale	21 October 1998 – 22 December 1999	Democratic Union for the Republic	Vincenzo Maria Vita (DS); Michele Lauria (PPI)
	Minister of Industry, Commerce and Craftsmanship	Pier Luigi Bersani	21 October 1998 – 22 December 1999	Democrats of the Left	Umberto Carpi (DS); Gianfranco Morgando (PPI)
	Minister of Labour and Social Security	Antonio Bassolino	21 October 1998 – 21 June 1999	Democrats of the Left	Claudio Caron (PdCI); Bianca Maria Fiorillo (RI); Raffaele Morese (Ind.); Luigi Viviani (DS)
	Minister of Labour and Social Security	Cesare Salvi	21 June 1999 – 22 December 1999	Democrats of the Left	Claudio Caron (PdCI); Bianca Maria Fiorillo (RI); Raffaele Morese (Ind.); Luigi Viviani (DS)
	Minister of Foreign Trade	Piero Fassino	21 October 1998 – 22 December 1999	Democrats of the Left	Antonello Cabras (DS)
	Minister of Health	Rosy Bindi	21 October 1998 – 22 December 1999	Italian People's Party	Monica Bettoni Brandani (DS); Antonino Mangiacavallo (RI)
	Minister of Cultural Heritage and Activities	Giovanna Melandri	21 October 1998 – 22 December 1999	Democrats of the Left	Giampaolo D'Andrea (PPI); Agazio Loiero (UDR)
	Minister of the Environment	Edo Ronchi	21 October 1998 – 22 December 1999	Federation of the Greens	Valerio Calzolaio (DS)
	Minister of University, Scientific Research and Technology	Ortensio Zecchino	21 October 1998 – 22 December 1999	Italian People's Party	Antonino Cuffaro (PdCI); Luciano Guerzoni (DS)
	Minister for Institutional Reforms (without portfolio)	Giuliano Amato	21 October 1998 – 13 May 1999	Independent	
	Minister for Institutional Reforms (without portfolio)	Antonio Maccanico	13 May 1999 – 22 December 1999	The Democrats	
	Minister for Equal Opportunities (without portfolio)	Laura Balbo	21 October 1998 – 22 December 1999	Federation of the Greens	
	Minister of Regional Affairs (without portfolio)	Katia Bellillo	21 October 1998 – 22 December 1999	Party of Italian Communists	
	Minister for Parliamentary Relations (without portfolio)	Gian Guido Folloni	21 October 1998 – 22 December 1999	Democratic Union for the Republic	Elena Montecchi (DS)
	Minister of Public Function (without portfolio)	Angelo Piazza	21 October 1998 – 22 December 1999	Italian Democratic Socialists	Gianclaudio Bressa (PPI)
	Minister of Social Solidarity (without portfolio)	Livia Turco	21 October 1998 – 22 December 1999	Democrats of the Left	
	Minister of Community Policies (without portfolio)	Enrico Letta	21 October 1998 – 22 December 1999	Italian People's Party	
