= Second Amato government =

56th government of the Italian Republic

- 56th Cabinet of Italy

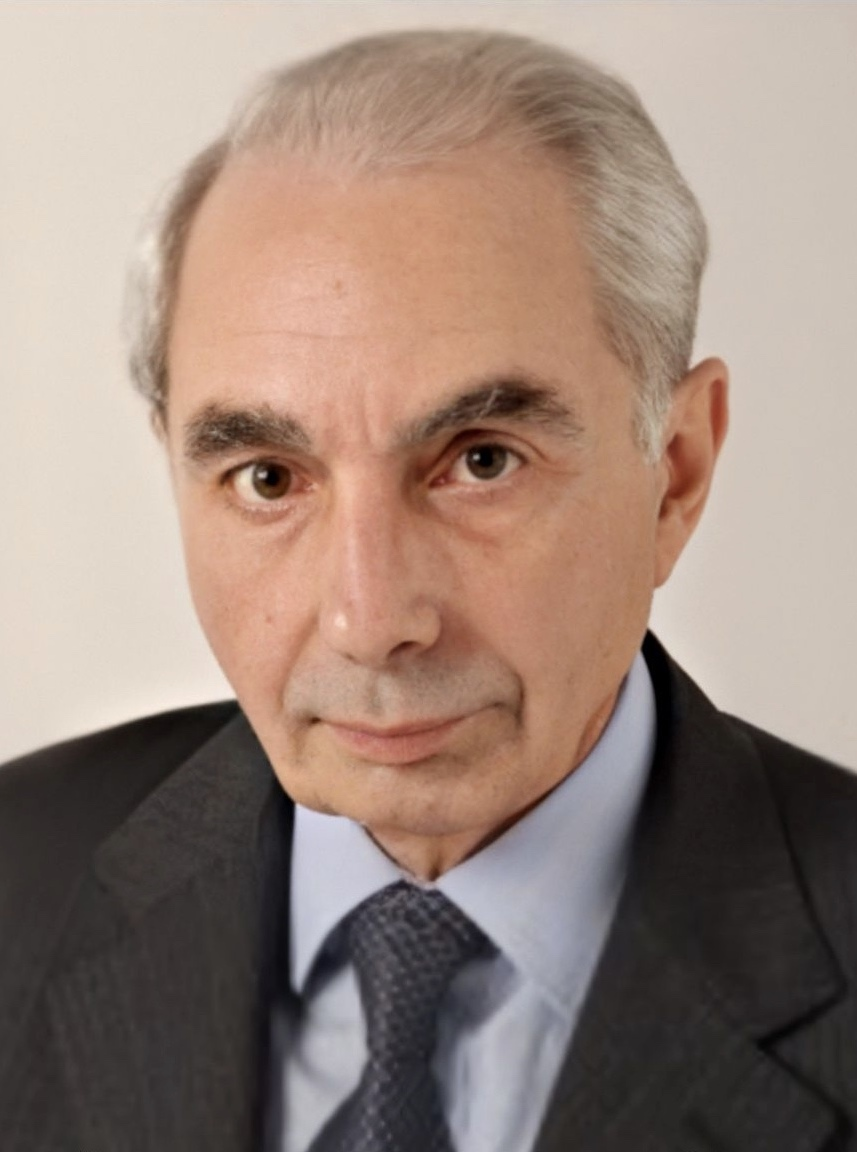
- Date formed: 26 April 2000
- Date dissolved: 11 June 2001 (412 days)

People and organisations
- Head of state: Carlo Azeglio Ciampi
- Head of government: Giuliano Amato
- No. of ministers: 25 (incl. Prime Minister)
- Member parties: DS, PPI, Dem, FdV, PdCI, UDEUR, RI, SDI
- Status in legislature: Centre-left coalition
- Opposition parties: FI, LN, AN, PRC, CCD, CDU
- Opposition leader: Silvio Berlusconi

History
- Outgoing election: 2001 election
- Legislature term: XIII Legislature (1996 – 2001)
- Predecessor: Second D'Alema government
- Successor: Second Berlusconi government

The second Amato government was the 56th government of the Italian Republic, the fourth and last government of the XIII Legislature. It held office from 26 April 2000 to 11 June 2001, a total of 412 days, or 1 year, 1 month and 17 days.

The government obtained the confidence of the Chamber of Deputies on 28 April 2000 with 319 votes in favour and 298 against., and the confidence of the Senate on 3 May 2000 with 179 votes in favour, 112 against and 2 abstentions.

Amato resigned on 31 May 2001, at the end of the legislature.

== Party breakdown ==
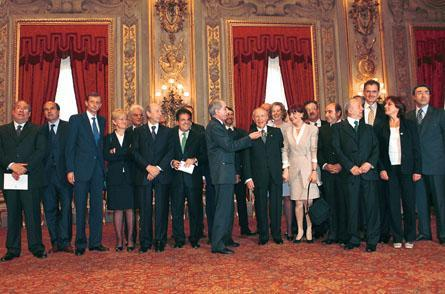
Official photo of the Amato's government after the oath at the Quirinal Palace

=== Ministers ===
- Democrats of the Left
7
- Italian People's Party
5
- Independents
3
- The Democrats
3
- Federation of the Greens
2
- Party of Italian Communists
2
- Union of Democrats for Europe
1
- Italian Renewal
1
- Italian Democratic Socialists
1

=== Ministers and other members ===
- Independents: Prime minister, 2 ministers and 3 undersecretaries
- Democrats of the Left (DS): 7 ministers and 19 undersecretaries
- Italian People’s Party (PPI): 5 ministers and 12 undersecretaries
- The Democrats (Dem): 3 ministers and 7 undersecretaries
- Federation of the Greens (FdV): 2 ministers and 2 undersecretaries
- Party of Italian Communists (PdCI): 2 ministers and 2 undersecretaries
- Union of Democrats for Europe (UDEur): 1 minister and 5 undersecretaries
- Italian Renewal (RI): 1 minister and 4 undersecretaries
- Italian Democratic Socialists (SDI): 1 minister and 2 undersecretaries

== Composition ==
| Portrait | Office | Name | Term | Party | Undersecretaries |
|---|---|---|---|---|---|
| | Prime Minister | Giuliano Amato | 26 April 2000 – 11 June 2001 | Independent | Enrico Luigi Micheli (PPI); Gianclaudio Bressa (PPI) (Note: Delegated to special autonomies and linguistic minorities.); Vannino Chiti (DS) (Note: Delegated to information and publishing.) |
| | Minister of Foreign Affairs | Lamberto Dini | 26 April 2000 – 11 June 2001 | Italian Renewal | Franco Danieli (Dem); Umberto Ranieri (DS); Rino Serri (DS); Ugo Intini (SDI) |
| | Minister of the Interior | Enzo Bianco | 26 April 2000 – 11 June 2001 | The Democrats | Aniello Di Nardo (Dem); Massimo Brutti (DS); Gian Franco Schietroma (SDI); Severino Lavagnini (PPI) |
| | Minister of Justice | Piero Fassino | 26 April 2000 – 11 June 2001 | Democrats of the Left | Franco Corleone (FdV); Marianna Li Calzi (RI); Rocco Maggi (Dem) |
| | Minister of Treasury, Budget and Economic Planning | Vincenzo Visco | 26 April 2000 – 11 June 2001 | Democrats of the Left | Dino Piero Giarda (Ind.); Gianfranco Morgando (PPI); Santino Pagano (UDEUR); Bruno Solaroli (DS) |
| | Minister of Finance | Ottaviano Del Turco | 26 April 2000 – 11 June 2001 | Italian Democratic Socialists | Natale D'Amico (RI); Alfiero Grandi (DS); Armando Veneto (PPI) (until 9 Feb. 2001) |
| | Minister of Defense | Sergio Mattarella | 26 April 2000 – 11 June 2001 | Italian People's Party | Gianni Rivera (Dem); Marco Minniti (DS); Massimo Ostillio (UDEUR) |
| | Minister of Public Education | Tullio De Mauro | 26 April 2000 – 11 June 2001 | Independent | Giuseppe Gambale (Dem); Silvia Barbieri (DS); Giovanni Manzini (PPI); Carla Rocchi (FdV) (until 4 Aug. 2000) |
| | Minister of Public Works | Nerio Nesi | 26 April 2000 – 11 June 2001 | Party of Italian Communists | Antonio Bargone (Ind.); Antonino Mangiacavallo (RI) (since 4 Aug. 2000); Domenico Romano Carratelli (PPI) (since 28 Dic. 2000); Salvatore Ladu (PPI) (until 28 Dic. 2000) |
| | Minister of Agricultural and Forestry Policies | Alfonso Pecoraro Scanio | 26 April 2000 – 11 June 2001 | Federation of the Greens | Roberto Borroni (DS); Luigi Nocera (UDEUR) |
| | Minister of Transport and Navigation | Pier Luigi Bersani | 26 April 2000 – 11 June 2001 | Democrats of the Left | Giordano Angelini (DS); Luca Danese (UDEUR); Mario Occhipinti (Dem) |
| | Minister of Communications | Salvatore Cardinale | 26 April 2000 – 11 June 2001 | Italian People's Party | Michele Lauria (PPI); Vincenzo Maria Vita (DS) |
| | Minister of Industry, Commerce, Craftsmanship and Foreign Trade | Enrico Letta | 26 April 2000 – 11 June 2001 | Italian People's Party | Cesare De Piccoli (DS); Stefano Passigli (DS); Mauro Fabris (UDEUR) |
| | Minister of Health | Umberto Veronesi | 26 April 2000 – 11 June 2001 | Independent | Ombretta Fumagalli Carulli (RI); Grazia Labate (DS); Carla Rocchi (FdV) (since 4 Aug. 2000) |
| | Minister of Cultural Heritage and Activities | Giovanna Melandri | 26 April 2000 – 11 June 2001 | Democrats of the Left | Giampaolo D'Andrea (PPI); Carlo Carli (DS) |
| | Minister of Labour and Social Security | Cesare Salvi | 26 April 2000 – 11 June 2001 | Democrats of the Left | Paolo Guerrini (PdCI); Raffaele Morese (Ind.); Ornella Piloni (DS) |
| | Minister of the Environment | Willer Bordon | 26 April 2000 – 11 June 2001 | The Democrats | Valerio Calzolaio (DS); Nicola Fusillo (PPI) |
| | Minister of University and Scientific and Technological Research | Ortensio Zecchino | 26 April 2000 – 2 February 2001 | Italian People's Party | Antonino Cuffaro (PdCI); Luciano Guerzoni (DS); Vincenzo Sica (Dem) |
| | Minister of University and Scientific and Technological Research | Giuliano Amato (ad interim) | 2 February 2001 – 11 June 2001 | Independent | Antonino Cuffaro (PdCI); Luciano Guerzoni (DS); Vincenzo Sica (Dem) |
| | Minister for Institutional Reforms (without portfolio) | Antonio Maccanico | 26 April 2000 – 11 June 2001 | The Democrats | Dario Franceschini (PPI) |
| | Minister for Equal Opportunities (without portfolio) | Katia Bellillo | 26 April 2000 – 11 June 2001 | Party of Italian Communists | |
| | Minister of Regional Affairs (without portfolio) | Agazio Loiero | 26 April 2000 – 11 June 2001 | Union of Democrats for Europe | |
| | Minister for Parliamentary Relations (without portfolio) | Patrizia Toia | 26 April 2000 – 11 June 2001 | Italian People's Party | Elena Montecchi (DS) |
| | Minister of Public Function (without portfolio) | Franco Bassanini | 26 April 2000 – 11 June 2001 | Democrats of the Left | Dario Franceschini (PPI); Gianclaudio Bressa (PPI); Raffaele Cananzi (PPI) |
| | Minister of Social Security (without portfolio) | Livia Turco | 26 April 2000 – 11 June 2001 | Democrats of the Left | |
| | Minister of Community Policies (without portfolio) | Gianni Francesco Mattioli | 26 April 2000 – 11 June 2001 | Federation of the Greens | |
