= First Prodi government =

53rd government of the Italian Republic

- 53rd Cabinet of Italy

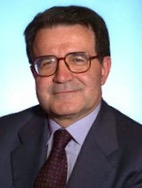
- Date formed: 18 May 1996
- Date dissolved: 21 October 1998 (887 days)

People and organisations
- Head of state: Oscar Luigi Scalfaro
- Head of government: Romano Prodi
- No. of ministers: 22 (incl. Prime Minister)
- Ministers removed: 1
- Total no. of members: 23 (incl. Prime Minister)
- Member party: PDS, PPI, RI, FdV, UD; External support: PRC
- Status in legislature: Centre-left coalition
- Opposition party: FI, AN, LN, CCD, CDU
- Opposition leader: Silvio Berlusconi

History
- Election: 1996 election
- Legislature term: XIII Legislature (1996 – 2001)
- Predecessor: Dini government
- Successor: First D'Alema government

The first Prodi government was the 53rd government of Italy. It held office from 18 May 1996 until 21 October 1998.

== Formation ==
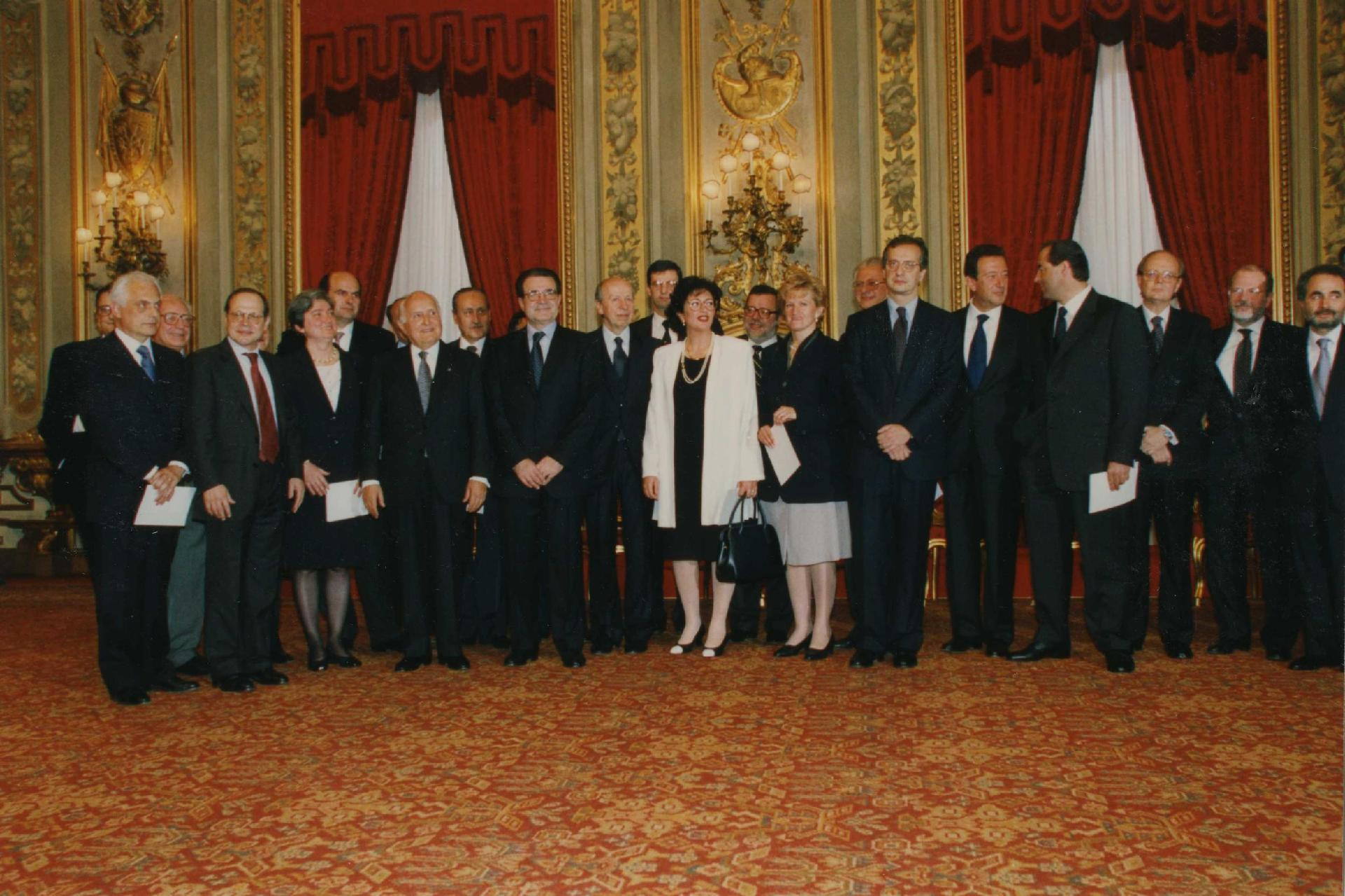
Official photo of the Prodi's government after the oath at the Quirinal Palace

On 21 April 1996, the Olive Tree won 1996 general election in alliance with the Communist Refoundation Party (PRC), making Romano Prodi Prime Minister of Italy. The Olive Tree's main component was the Democratic Party of the Left, which contained the bulk of the former Italian Communist Party. The PDS' Walter Veltroni, who ran in ticket with Prodi in a long electoral campaign, served as Deputy Prime Minister, and 15 other PDS ministers joined him in cabinet alongside 10 PDS junior ministers. It was the first time that (former) Communists had taken part in government since 1947.

Besides the external support of PRC, the coalition received the support also of some minor parties: the Italian Republican Party (PRI, social-liberal), The Network (social-democratic), the South Tyrolean People's Party (regionalist and Christian democratic) and some other minor parties which later merged with PDS.

The average age of the ministers was 55.9 years and 14 ministers has parliamentary experience. The number of female ministers was three.

== Crisis and fall ==
In October 1998, the Communist Refoundation Party (PRC) announced the end of its confidence and supply agreement with the government majority and joined the opposition. This decision met with considerable opposition within the PRC itself: several deputies and senators, led by Oliviero Diliberto and Armando Cossutta, announced that they would continue to support the government.

On 9 October 1998, Prodi appeared in front of the Chamber of Deputies and called for a vote of confidence in the government; after several hours of heated debate, the Chamber denied the government its confidence by 312 votes to 313. Prodi resigned soon afterwards.

In the following days, 27 deputies and senators left the PRC and established the Party of Italian Communists (PdCI), under the leadership of Cossutta and Diliberto. Concurrently, the newly formed Democratic Union for the Republic (UDR), a small centrist group of former centre-right members of parliament, announced its willingness to support a centre-left cabinet.

After twelve days of talks, a new cabinet was formed under the leadership of Massimo D'Alema, which included PdCI and UDR.

== Party breakdown ==
- Independents: Prime minister, 3 ministers and 4 undersecretaries
- Democratic Party of the Left (PDS): 10 ministers and 16 undersecretaries
- Italian People’s Party (PPI): 3 ministers and 11 undersecretaries
- Italian Renewal (RI): 3 ministers and 4 undersecretaries
- Federation of the Greens (FdV): 1 minister and 3 undersecretaries
- Democratic Union (UD): 1 minister and 2 undersecretaries
- Segni Pact (Patto): 2 undersecretaries
- Italian Socialists (SI): 1 undersecretary
- Democratic Alliance (AD): 1 undersecretary
- Movement of Unitarian Communists (MCU): 1 undersecretary
- Republican Left (SR): 1 undersecretary

== Composition ==
Portrait	Office	Name	Term	Party	Undersecretaries
	Prime Minister	Romano Prodi	18 May 1996 – 21 October 1998	Independent	Enrico Luigi Micheli (PPI); Arturo Parisi (Ind.) (Note: Delegated to information and publishing.); Giorgio Bogi (SR) (until 14 March 1997)
	Deputy Prime Minister	Walter Veltroni	18 May 1996 – 21 October 1998	Democratic Party of the Left	Enrico Luigi Micheli (PPI); Arturo Parisi (Ind.); Giorgio Bogi (SR) (until 14 March 1997)
	Minister of Foreign Affairs	Lamberto Dini	18 May 1996 – 21 October 1998	Italian Renewal	Piero Fassino (PDS); Rino Serri (MCU); Patrizia Toia (PPI)
	Minister of the Interior	Giorgio Napolitano	18 May 1996 – 21 October 1998	Democratic Party of the Left	Franco Barberi (Ind.); Fabrizio Abbate (PPI); Giannicola Sinisi (PPI); Adriana Vigneri (PDS); Lucio Testa (RI); Angelo Giorgianni (RI) (until 13 March 1998)
	Minister of Grace and Justice	Giovanni Maria Flick	18 May 1996 – 21 October 1998	Independent	Giuseppe Ayala (UD); Franco Corleone (FdV); Antonino Mirone (Patto)
	Minister of Treasury, Budget and Economic Planning	Carlo Azeglio Ciampi	18 May 1996 – 21 October 1998	Independent	Laura Pennacchi (PDS); Giorgio Macciotta (PDS); Isaia Sales (PDS); Roberto Pinza (PPI); Filippo Cavazzuti (PDS); Dino Piero Giarda (Ind.)
	Minister of Finance	Vincenzo Visco	18 May 1996 – 21 October 1998	Democratic Party of the Left	Giovanni Marongiu (RI); Fausto Vigevani (PDS); Pierluigi Castellani (PPI) (since 21 Nov. 1996)
	Minister of Defence	Beniamino Andreatta	18 May 1996 – 21 October 1998	Italian People's Party	Massimo Brutti (PPI); Gianni Rivera (Patto)
	Minister of Education, University, Scientific and Technological Research	Luigi Berlinguer	18 May 1996 – 21 October 1998	Democratic Party of the Left	Nadia Masini (PDS); Carla Rocchi (FdV); Albertina Soliani (PPI)
	Minister of Public Works	Antonio Di Pietro	18 May 1996 – 20 November 1996	Independent	Antonio Bargone (PDS); Gianni Francesco Mattioli (FdV)
	Minister of Public Works	Paolo Costa	20 November 1996 – 21 October 1998	Independent	Antonio Bargone (PDS); Gianni Francesco Mattioli (FdV)
	Minister of Agricultural Resources	Michele Pinto	18 May 1996 – 21 October 1998	Italian People's Party	Roberto Borroni (PDS)
	Minister of Transport and Navigation	Claudio Burlando	18 May 1996 – 21 October 1998	Democratic Party of the Left	Giuseppe Albertini (PDS); Giuseppe Soriero (PDS)
	Minister of Post and Telecommunications	Antonio Maccanico	18 May 1996 – 21 October 1998	Democratic Union	Vincenzo Maria Vita (PDS); Michele Lauria (PPI)
	Minister of Industry, Commerce and Craftsmanship	Pier Luigi Bersani	18 May 1996 – 21 October 1998	Democratic Party of the Left	Umberto Carpi (PDS); Salvatore Ladu (PPI)
	Minister of Labour and Social Security	Tiziano Treu	18 May 1996 – 21 October 1998	Italian Renewal	Antonio Pizzinato (PDS); Federica Gasparrini (RI); Elena Montecchi (PDS) (until 23 Feb. 1998); Alessandro Garilli (Ind.) (since 20 March 1998)
	Minister of Foreign Trade	Augusto Fantozzi	18 May 1996 – 21 October 1998	Italian Renewal	Antonello Cabras (UD)
	Minister of Health	Rosy Bindi	18 May 1996 – 21 October 1998	Italian People's Party	Bruno Viserta Costantini (PDS); Monica Bettoni Brandani (PDS)
	Minister of Cultural Heritage and Activities	Walter Veltroni	18 May 1996 – 21 October 1998	Democratic Party of the Left	Willer Bordon (AD); Alberto La Volpe (SI)
	Minister of the Environment	Edo Ronchi	18 May 1996 – 21 October 1998	Federation of the Greens	Valerio Calzolaio (PDS)
	Minister of Public Function and Regional Affairs (without portfolio)	Franco Bassanini	18 May 1996 – 21 October 1998	Democratic Party of the Left	Sergio Zoppi (PPI); Ernesto Bettinelli (Ind.) (since 13 Feb. 1997)
	Minister for Parliamentary Relations (without portfolio)	Giorgio Bogi	14 March 1997 – 21 October 1998	Republican Left	Elena Montecchi (PDS) (since 23 Feb. 1998)
	Minister for Equal Opportunities (without portfolio)	Anna Finocchiaro	18 May 1996 – 21 October 1998	Democratic Party of the Left	
	Minister of Social Solidarity (without portfolio)	Livia Turco	18 May 1996 – 21 October 1998	Democratic Party of the Left	

== Sources ==
- Italian Government - Prodi I Cabinet
