= Luciano Guerzoni =

Luciano Guerzoni may refer to:

- Luciano Guerzoni (born 1935), Italian politician, Member of the Senate in the XI, XII, XIII, and XIV Legislatures
- Luciano Guerzoni (born 1938), Italian politician, Member of the Chamber of Deputies in the IX, X, and XII Legislatures
