= Michela Vittoria Brambilla =

Italian politician and businesswoman

Michela Brambilla
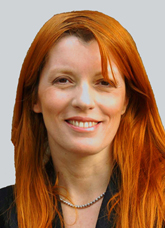

Minister of Tourism
- In office 8 May 2009 – 16 November 2011
- Prime Minister: Silvio Berlusconi
- Preceded by: Office not in use
- Succeeded by: Piero Gnudi

Member of the Chamber of Deputies
- Incumbent
- Assumed office 29 April 2008
- Constituency: Emilia-Romagna (2008–2018); Abbiategrasso (2018–2022); Gela (since 2022)

Personal details
- Born: 26 October 1967 (age 58) Lecco, Italy
- Party: Forza Italia (2006–2009); PdL (2009–2013); Forza Italia (2013–2022); Independent (2022–2024); Us Moderates (since 2024)
- Occupation: Businesswoman; politician; journalist

Michela Vittoria Brambilla (born 26 October 1967) is an Italian politician, animal rights activist and businesswoman. On 12 May 2008 she was nominated Undersecretary for Tourism in the Berlusconi IV Cabinet; on 8 May 2009 she was appointed Minister of Culture and Tourism, a position held until 2011. In 2007 she set up The People of Freedom, the goal of which was to merge the right-wing allies of Berlusconi. She is a current leader of the Animalist Movement.

== Biography ==
Heir of a family of steel manufacturers going back four generations, Brambilla received a degree in philosophy from the Università Cattolica del Sacro Cuore. In 2006 she lost an election for the Chamber of Deputies, on the Forza Italia ticket. In 2007 she named herself president of the national association of the Club of Freedom, the political organisation she created, which has more than 6,000 clubs all around Italy.

Before entering politics she was a television journalist for Berlusconi's Mediaset group. She is the general executive manager of Trafilerie Brambilla spa, a steel manufacturing firm, and is president of two businesses with her father Vittorio: Sal Group spa and Sotra Coast International.

She rose quickly to national prominence in 2003 after having been named president of the under-40 entrepreneurs' council at Confcommercio. On 20 November 2006 she founded the Freedom Circles organisation and published the book titled Tutte le tasse di Prodi & C.: una finanziaria contro gli italiani. She has worked very closely with Silvio Berlusconi, the president of the Forza Italia party. Some observers (such as the magazine Panorama), name her as a possible successor to Berlusconi, as leader of the party and of the Italian centre-right. Brambilla has publicly denied such rumours.

In June 2007, through the Freedom Clubs organisation, Brambilla launched the satellite channel Freedom TV, featuring talks with experts, professionals and private citizens, often connected with her personal campaign against tax evasion.

== Animal rights ==
Brambilla is a vegan and advocate of animal rights. She is the founder of the Italian League for the Defense of Animals and the Environment (LEIDAA).

In 2017, she formed the Animalist Movement, a political faction of Forza Italia to protect animal rights.

== See also ==
- List of animal rights advocates

Political offices
Preceded by Fabio Gobbo, Enrico Letta, Ricardo Franco Levi, Enrico Micheli	Undersecretary to the Prime Minister; 2008 – 2009; Served alongside: Maurizio Balocchi, Paolo Bonaiuti, Aldo Brancher, Carlo Giovanardi, Gianfranco Miccichè	Succeeded by -
Preceded by Francesco Rutelli	Minister of Culture and Tourism; 2009 – 2011	Succeeded by Piero Gnudi
