= Guerzoni =

Guerzoni is a surname. Notable people with the surname include:

- Fausto Guerzoni (1904–1967), Italian film actor
- Giuseppe Guerzoni (1835–1886), Italian playwright
- Luciano Guerzoni (1935–2017), Italian politician
- Luciano Guerzoni (1938–2020), Italian politician
