= Ortensio Zecchino =

Italian historian and politician (born 1943)

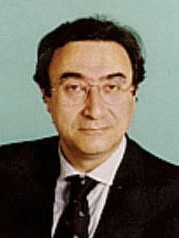

Minister of University and Research
- In office 21 October 1998 – 2 February 2001
- Prime Minister: Massimo D'Alema; Giuliano Amato
- Preceded by: Luigi Berlinguer
- Succeeded by: Fabio Mussi

Member of the Senate
- In office 2 July 1987 – 29 May 2001

Personal details
- Born: 20 April 1943 (age 83) Asmara, British Military Administration in Eritrea
- Party: DC (till 1994); PPI (1994–2001); DE (2001–2002)
- Education: University of Naples Federico II
- Occupation: Academic, politician

Ortensio Zecchino (born 20 April 1943) is an Italian academic and politician. He is a former Italian Minister of University and Research.

== Biography ==
After teaching History of Medieval Institutions at the Suor Orsola Benincasa University of Naples, Zecchino joined the Christian Democracy and was elected regional councilor of Campania, holding the seat from 1970 to 1979, until he has been elected to the European Parliament.

In 1987, Zecchino has been elected for the first time to the Senate and held the seat in Palazzo Madama until 2001. In 1998, Zecchino joined the D'Alema I Cabinet in which he has been appointed Minister of University and Research and kept the leadership of the ministry in the D'Alema II Cabinet and the Amato II Cabinet.

Zecchino left the PPI in 2001 when the party was federated into The Daisy, and joined Sergio D'Antoni's European Democracy. He then moved to Ariano Irpino. where he is heading BioGeM ("Biology and Molecular Genetics") and CESN ("European Centre for Norman Studies").
