= Ombretta Fumagalli Carulli =

Italian politician (1944–2021)

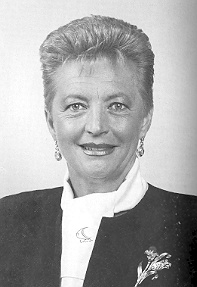
- Carulli in 1990

Member of the Chamber of Deputies of Italy
- In office 2 July 1987 – 8 May 1996

Senator from Vercelli
- In office 9 May 1996 – 29 May 2001

Undersecretary to the Ministry of the Interior
- In office 22 December 1999 – 26 April 2000
- Preceded by: Franco Barberi
- Succeeded by: Gian Franco Schietroma

Undersecretary to the Ministry of Health
- In office 26 April 2000 – 11 June 2001
- Preceded by: Fabio Di Capua
- Succeeded by: Cesare Cursi

Personal details
- Born: 5 March 1944 Meda, Kingdom of Italy
- Died: 16 March 2021 (aged 77) Milan, Italy
- Party: DC; CCD

Ombretta Fumagalli Carulli (5 March 1944 – 16 March 2021) was an Italian politician, jurist, and academic.

== Biography ==
Carulli earned a law degree from the Università Cattolica del Sacro Cuore in 1966. In 1975, she became the first female chairperson of canon law and subsequently ecclesiastical law. In 1981, she was elected to the High Council of the Judiciary, where she served until 1986 and presided over Executive Appointments Committee and founded the Anti-Mafia Committee.

Carulli began her political career in 1987, when she was elected to the Chamber of Deputies as a member of the Christian Democracy party. She was re-elected to the Palazzo Montecitorio and subsequently served in the Ciampi Cabinet. In 1994, she joined Pier Ferdinando Casini's Christian Democratic Centre and was part of the Forza Italia coalition. She also became the Undersecretary to the Presidency of the Council for Civil Protection under the Berlusconi I Cabinet.

In 1996, Carulli was elected to the Senate and joined the center-right Pole for Freedoms coalition, but joined the liberal-centrist Italian Renewal, led by Lamberto Dini, in 1997. In 1999, she became Undersecretary to the Ministry of the Interior under the D'Alema II Cabinet, which was dissolved on 26 April 2000. She then became Undersecretary to the Ministry of Health under the Amato II Cabinet. She left politics in 2001 and did not seek reelection to the Senate.

She returned to the Università Cattolica del Sacro Cuore following her political career, teaching ecclesiastical and canon law. She authored several hundred academic, religious, and social publications. In 2003, she was nominated by Pope John Paul II to join the Pontifical Academy of Social Sciences. Although she was no longer publicly involved with politics, she joined the Union of the Centre.

In 2012, Carulli became President of the Christian Democrats, led by Gianni Fontana.

Ombretta Fumagalli Carulli died in Milan on 16 March 2021 at the age of 77.
