= Giuseppe Albertini =

Italian politician (1952–2026)

Member of the Chamber of Deputies
- In office 1992–2006

Undersecretary of State for Transport and Navigation
- In office May 1996 – October 1998
- Prime Minister: Romano Prodi

Mayor of Cento
- In office 1978–1989

Personal details
- Born: 29 March 1952 Cento, Italy
- Died: 26 February 2026 (aged 73)
- Party: Italian Socialist Party; Italian Democratic Socialists; Italian Socialist Party
- Occupation: Civil servant

Giuseppe Albertini (29 March 1952 – 26 February 2026) was an Italian politician who served as mayor of Cento and later as a member of the Chamber of Deputies. He was an undersecretary of state for transport and navigation in the Prodi I Cabinet. After the dissolution of the Italian Socialist Party, he remained active in successor organisations, including the Italian Democratic Socialists, and later joined the reconstituted Italian Socialist Party.

== Early life ==
Albertini was born in Cento, in the Province of Ferrara, on 29 March 1952. He completed upper secondary education and worked as a civil servant before entering national politics. He began his political activity within the Italian Socialist Party. In later years, he lived in San Matteo della Decima, where funeral rites were held after his death.

== Career ==
Albertini became mayor of Cento at the age of 26 and served from 1978 to 1989. During his tenure, he expanded local utility networks and reshaped parts of the historic centre, including works connected to the Canale di Cento. He also restorated projects involving the Rocca and other civic buildings, as well as cultural facilities with municipal collections. He was also involved in an early 1980s proposal for a cycling route along the Reno.

Within party structures, he held leadership roles among socialists in Ferrara province and was provincial secretary of the Italian Socialist Party in 1988. After the party's crisis in the early 1990s, the Italian Socialist Party, he was active in the continuity of socialist organisation through successor formations. He was later associated with the reconstituted PSI led by Riccardo Nencini.

Albertini was elected to the Chamber of Deputies in 1992 and served until 2006. During his parliamentary career, he served in roles connected to agricultural policy, including vice presidency of the Agriculture Commission, and as a member of the Agriculture Commission in the XIV legislature from June 2001 to April 2006.

From May 1996 to October 1998, Albertini served as undersecretary of state for transport and navigation in the Prodi I Cabinet.

He was one of the founding members of the Italian Democratic Socialists and served as the party's national treasurer. In the 2000s, he was associated with the Rose in the Fist political project, and was among the founders and legal representatives of the political association La Rosa nel Pugno in litigation on electoral list requirements. Later, he joined the reconstituted Italian Socialist Party (2007) and held roles in its national bodies.

== Later life and death ==
In later life, he withdrew from active politics because of a severe, progressive illness. He died on 26 February 2026, at the age of 73.
