= Elio Vito =

Italian politician (born 1960)

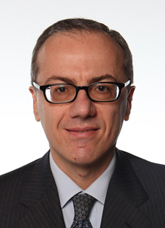
- Elio Vito in 2013.

Minister for Parliamentary Relations
- In office 8 May 2008 – 16 November 2011
- Prime Minister: Silvio Berlusconi
- Preceded by: Vannino Chiti
- Succeeded by: Dino Piero Giarda

Member of the Chamber of Deputies
- In office 23 April 1992 – 13 July 2022
- Constituency: Naples-Caserta (1992–1994); Bollate (1994–1996); Catania (1996–2001); Umbria (2001–2006); Campania 1 (2006–2008); Tuscany (2008-2013); Piedmont 2 (2013–2018); Apulia (2018–2022)

Personal details
- Born: 12 November 1960 (age 65) Naples, Italy
- Party: PR (till 1989); LP (1989-1994); FI (1994-2009); PdL (2009-2013); FI (2013-2022); RI (since 2022)
- Education: University of Naples Federico II
- Occupation: Politician, employee

Elio Vito (born 12 November 1960) is an Italian politician, member of the Chamber of Deputies of Italy from 1992 to 2022.

== Biography ==
Vito graduated in Sociology from the University of Naples.

He became a member of Forza Italia in 1994, and of People of Freedom in 2008. From 1988 to 1992, he was a councillor for Naples. In 1992, he joined the Chamber of Deputies of Italy.

In 2008, he was appointed as Minister for Parliamentary Relations under Silvio Berlusconi, a position he held until 2011.
