= Willer Bordon =

Italian politician (1949–2015)

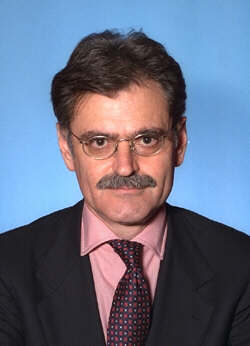

Minister of Environment
- In office 25 April 2000 – 11 June 2001
- Prime Minister: Giuliano Amato
- Preceded by: Edo Ronchi
- Succeeded by: Altero Matteoli

Minister of Public Works
- In office 22 December 1999 – 25 April 2000
- Prime Minister: Massimo D'Alema
- Preceded by: Enrico Luigi Micheli
- Succeeded by: Nerio Nesi

Member of the Senate of the Republic
- In office 30 May 2001 – 28 April 2008
- Constituency: Friuli-Venezia Giulia

Member of the Chamber of Deputies
- In office 2 July 1987 – 29 May 2001
- Constituency: Trieste (1987–1994); Suzzara (1994–1996); Rome (1996–2001)

Personal details
- Born: 16 January 1949 Muggia, Free Territory of Trieste
- Died: 14 July 2015 (aged 66) Rome, Italy
- Party: List: PR (1987–1989) PCI (1989–1991) PDS (1991–1993) AD (1993–1996) UD (1996–1998) IdV (1998–1999) The Democrats (1999–2002) DL (2002–2007) UDpC (2007–2015)

Willer Bordon (16 January 1949 – 14 July 2015) was an Italian academic, businessman and politician who served in different cabinet posts at the end of the 1990s and 2000s.

== Early life ==
Bordon was born in Muggia, Province of Trieste, on 16 January 1949.

== Career ==
Bordon was the mayor of Muggia for eleven years. In 1987, he was elected to the Italian parliament, being a deputy for Trieste. He founded Democratic Alliance, a small centre-left party, in 1992. He resigned from the party in June 1994 following the poor achievement in the general election. Later he joined the Margherita party. From 1998 to 1999 he served as the minister for public works. He was appointed minister of environment to the cabinet led by Prime Minister Giuliano Amato in April 2000. Bordon replaced Edo Ronchi as minister of environment.

Bordon also served as the member of the Italian Senate. In 2008 Bordon retired from the Senate. After leaving politics, he became the president of the Enalg SpA. In addition, he also began to work as a professor of political science at La Sapienza University.

== Death ==
Bordon died at the age of 66 on 14 July 2015.

== Electoral history ==
Election	House	Constituency	Party	Votes	Result
1987	Chamber of Deputies	Trieste	PCI	5,279	Elected
1992	Chamber of Deputies	Trieste	PDS	10,552	Elected
1994	Chamber of Deputies	Suzzara	AD	37,838	Elected
1996	Chamber of Deputies	Rome – Ciampino	UD	43,067	Elected
2001	Senate of the Republic	Friuli-Venezia Giulia – Trieste	Dem	58,585	Elected
2006	Senate of the Republic	Friuli-Venezia Giulia	DL	– (Note: Elected in a closed list proportional representation system.)	Elected
