= Edo Ronchi =

Italian engineer and politician (born 1950)

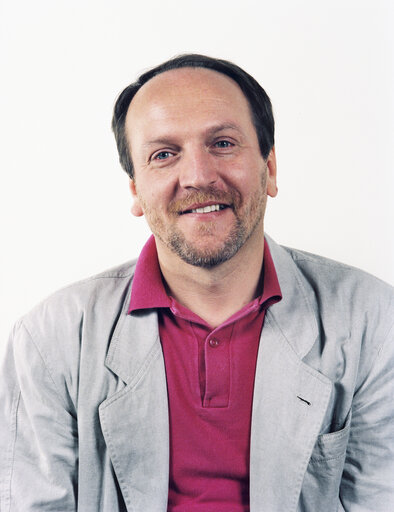

Minister of the Environment
- In office 17 May 1996 – 26 April 2000
- Prime Minister: Romano Prodi; Massimo D'Alema
- Succeeded by: Willer Bordon

Member of the Senate of the Republic
- In office 28 April 2006 – 28 April 2008
- Constituency: Veneto
- In office 15 April 1994 – 29 May 2001
- Constituency: Piedmont

Member of the Chamber of Deputies
- In office 12 July 1983 – 14 April 1994
- Constituency: Brescia (1983–1992); Como (1992–1994)

Personal details
- Born: 31 May 1950 (age 76) Treviglio, Italy
- Party: List: AO (1968–1979); DP (1978–1989); VA (1989–1990); FdV (1990–2001); DS (2001–2007); PD (2007–2008)
- Education: Politecnico di Milano

Edo Ronchi (born 31 May 1950) is an Italian engineer and politician. He served as Minister of Environment and protection of land and sea from 1996 to 2000 in three different cabinets. He was the first Green politician to hold a cabinet post in Italy.

== Early life and education ==
Ronchi was born in Treviglio on 31 May 1950. He holds an electrical engineering degree from the Politecnico di Milano.

== Career and activities ==
Ronchi had a revolutionary communist political leaning. Later, he became a member of the Federation of the Greens. He joined the party in 1983 and became a member of its steering committee in 1989. He was elected to the Italian Parliament in 1983. In 1989, he was elected to the European Parliament, but resigned from office after serving in the post for just one month to concentrate on his initiative, namely Rainbow Greens, which he had cofounded with Francesco Rutelli earlier in 1989. In 1992 Ronchi became senator and was the leader of the Federation of the Greens in the Italian Senate.

He was named minister of environment on 17 May 1996 to the cabinet headed by Prime Minister Romano Prodi. Ronchi became the first member of the party who assumed a cabinet post in the country. When Ronchi was in office as environment minister Italy signed the Kyoto Protocol in 1997.

After serving in the post in the first cabinet of Prime Minister Massimo D'Alema on 21 December 1999, Ronchi was reappointed minister of environment in the second cabinet of D'Alema. His tenure ended in April 2000 when the cabinet resigned. Ronchi was offered by Prime Minister Amato the post of minister of European affairs, but he did not accept the post due to his intention of serving as minister of environment. However, Ronchi's proposal was not endorsed, and Willer Bordon replaced him as minister of environment.

After leaving public office, Ronchi began to work at the Sustainable Development Foundation, and as of 2013, he was on the national advisory board of Ecomondo, an initiative for the green movement.

== Electoral history ==
Election	House	Constituency	Party	Votes	Result
1983	Chamber of Deputies	Brescia–Bergamo	DP	1,889	Elected
1987	Chamber of Deputies	Brescia–Bergamo	DP	2,482	Elected
1992	Chamber of Deputies	Como–Sondrio–Varese	FdV	2,027	Elected
1994	Senate of the Republic	Piedmont – Turin 3	FdV	52,671	Elected
1996	Senate of the Republic	Piedmont – Turin 3	FdV	69,874	Elected
2006	Senate of the Republic	Veneto	DS	– (Note: Elected in a closed list proportional representation system.)	Elected
