= Enrico Luigi Micheli =

Italian politician and writer

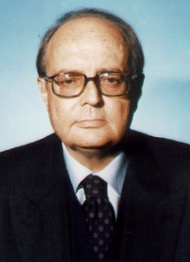

Minister of Public Works
- In office 21 October 1998 – 22 December 1999
- Prime Minister: Massimo D'Alema
- Preceded by: Paolo Costa
- Succeeded by: Willer Bordon

Secretary of the Council of Ministers
- In office 17 May 1996 – 21 October 1998
- Prime Minister: Romano Prodi
- Preceded by: Lamberto Cardia
- Succeeded by: Franco Bassanini
- In office 22 December 1999 – 11 June 2001
- Prime Minister: Massimo D'Alema; Giuliano Amato
- Preceded by: Franco Bassanini
- Succeeded by: Gianni Letta

Member of the Chamber of Deputies
- In office 9 May 1996 – 27 April 2006
- Constituency: Umbria

Personal details
- Born: 16 May 1938 Terni, Italy
- Died: 21 January 2011 (aged 72) Terni, Italy
- Party: PPI (1996–2002); DL (2002–2006)
- Education: University of Siena
- Profession: Politician, writer

Enrico Luigi Micheli (16 May 1938 – 21 January 2011) was an Italian politician and writer.

== Biography ==
After graduating in law in the University of Siena, Enrico Luigi Micheli worked as a manager for Alitalia and subsequently for the Intersind and the IRI (Institute for Industrial Reconstruction).

Micheli was elected Deputy in 1996 and 2001. As a close associate of Romano Prodi, Micheli was one of the founders of the Olive Tree. He served as Secretary of the Council of Ministers in the Prodi I Cabinet, D'Alema II Cabinet and Amato II Cabinet, while from 1998 to 1999 he served as Minister of Public Works in the D'Alema I Cabinet.

He died on 21 January 2011 at the age of 72, after a long illness.

== Bibliography ==
- Lo stato del cielo, Rai Eri (1993)
- Il ritorno di Andrea (1995)
- La gloria breve (1997)
- L'uomo con il Panama, Sellerio (1998)
- Federico e i colori della giovinezza (2000)
- L'annunziata (2001)
- Le scale del Paradiso (2003)
- Il palazzo del Papa (2005)
- Italo, Sellerio (2007)
- La casa sulla duna, Palomar
- Quando dalla finestra si vedeva l'Eur e noi sognavamo la rivoluzione, Sellerio (2010)
