= Giuseppe Ayala =

Italian politician and magistrate

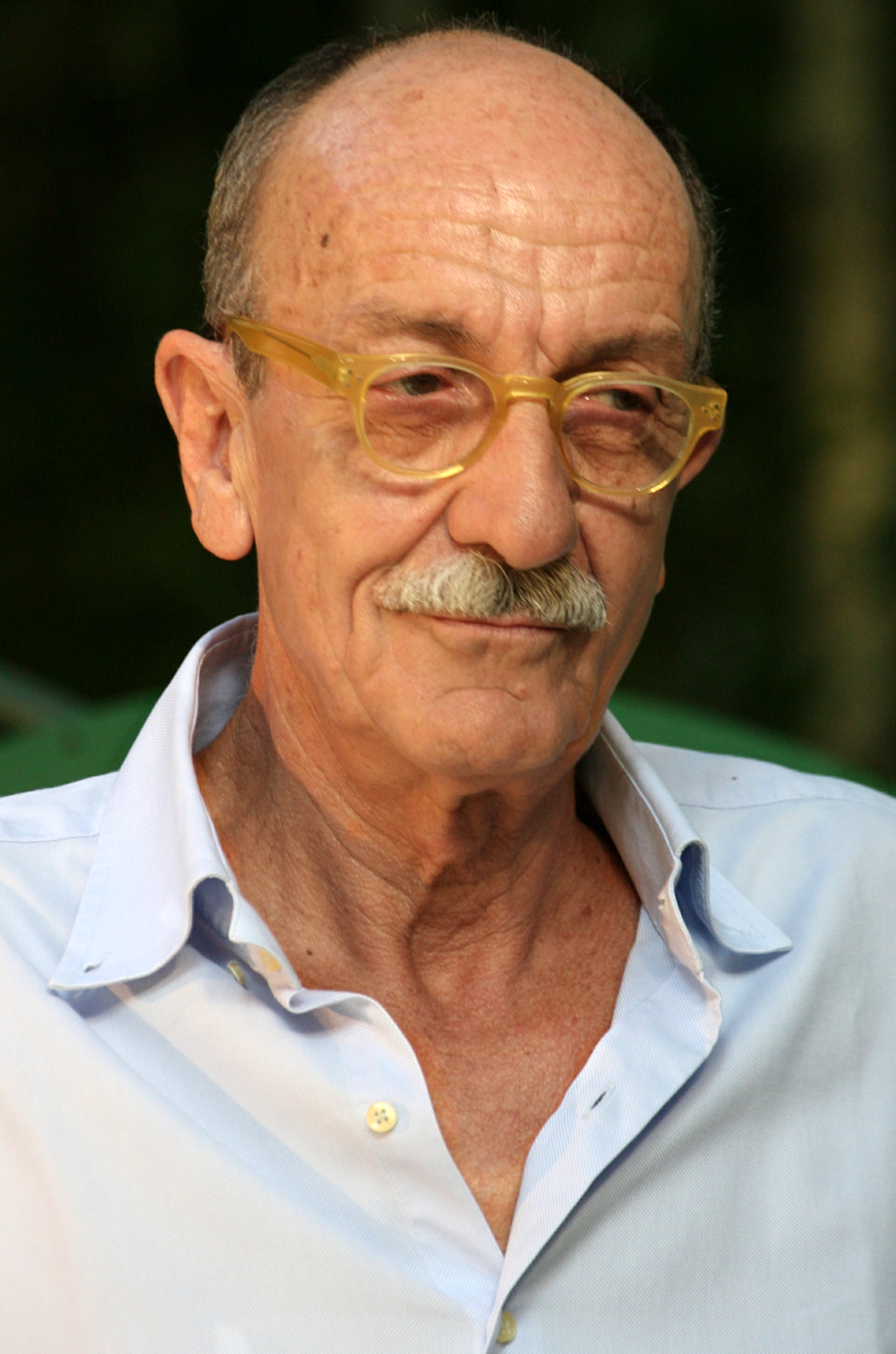
Giuseppe Ayala

Giuseppe Ayala (born 18 May 1945 in Caltanissetta) is an Italian politician and magistrate. He was known as an "anti-mafia" magistrate, and served as "anti-Mafia" judge. He raised doubts about whether it was only the Mafia that was involved in the killing of Giovanni Falcone. In 1993, Ayala published a book entitled La guerra dei giusti. I giudici, la mafia, la politica (The War of the Righteous: The Judges, The Mafia, and Politics), detailing his experiences in politics and his encounters with the mafia.

== Biography ==
Ayala graduated in law at the University of Palermo and worked as a substitute public prosecutor for the Republic, assisting the "anti-mafia pool" for several years. He was a public prosecutor at the first maxiprocess, later becoming Councilor of Cassation. He was elected to the Chamber of Deputies in 1992, shortly before the murder of Giovanni Falcone and Paolo Borsellino (magistrates of the anti-mafia pool with which Ayala had been interlocutor at the Public Prosecutor's Office), becoming a deputy in the ranks of the Italian Republican Party (PRI).

Following Tangentopoli, and the PRI crisis, Ayala joined the Democratic Alliance (AD), confirming the seat in the Chamber of Deputies in 1994. After the dissolution of AD he joined the Democratic Union (UD) of Antonio Maccanico, with which he was elected to the Senate in 1996. In 1998 he enrolled in the Democrats of the Left (DS), party with which he was elected senator in 2001 until 2006. He served as Undersecretary to the Ministry of Justice from 1996 to 2000, in the Prodi I government and in the D'Alema I and II governments. After 2006, he returned to the judiciary as a councilor of a civil section at the Court of Appeal of L'Aquila (2006–2011). He has been retired since December 2011.
