= Movimento Animalista =

Animalist Movement Movimento Animalista
- Leader: Michela Brambilla
- Founded: 20 May 2017
- Ideology: Animal rights Animal welfare
- Political position: Centre-right
- National affiliation: Us Moderates
- Colours
- Chamber of Deputies: 1 / 400 (Into Us Moderates)
- Senate: 0 / 205

Website
- movimentoanimalista.it

The Animalist Movement (Italian: Movimento Animalista, MA) is a centre-right political association in Italy. MA's aim is to protect animal rights.

Its leader is Michela Brambilla, a former Minister of Tourism in Silvio Berlusconi's fourth government, with Berlusconi himself an ex-member. During the party's founding event, Berlusconi stated that the MA could gain 20% of the vote in the next Italian general election and Brambilla stressed that the party was attracting people from several cultural and political backgrounds.

Supporters/members include Fiona Swarovski, Rita Dalla Chiesa, Marina Ripa di Meana, Andrea Roncato, and Carla Rocchi, president of the Animal Protection National Body (ENPA) association and former member of the Italian Parliament for the Federation of the Greens, a party she left in 2001 because she perceived it as too leftist. On August 10, 2017, Rinaldo Sidoli, the Italian Green Party's Spokesperson on Animal Issues joined Brambilla's new party, becoming 'Responsabile centro studi Movimento Animalista'. He stated: "It's the only party advocating for animal protection and is a great example of how politics can take a lead on animal welfare. Greens have made the wrong decision looking too much to left politics and forgetting the meaning of intersectional politics". He resigned on June 26, 2018 saying: "It is not an intersectional party anymore".
