= Nerio Nesi =

Italian politician, businessman, and banker (1925–2024)

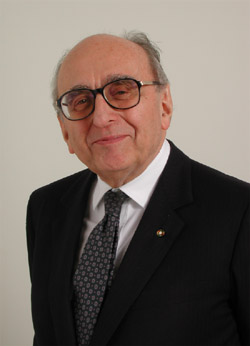
Nesi in the 1990s

Nerio Nesi (16 June 1925 – 11 February 2024) was an Italian politician, businessman and banker.

== Biography ==
Born into a working-class family of Corticella, a district of Bologna (his father was a worker and the mother a housewife), Nesi participated in the partisan resistance and then graduated in law. Profoundly Catholic, his first political experience was in Christian Democracy (DC), but a choice was not linked to ideological reasons but by the conformist spirit, since in his city, the Italian Communist Party (PCI) had 58% of the vote, while the DC trudged to 12% approximately.

A friend of Enrico Berlinguer, Nesi participated with him to a mission in the USSR and for this he was expelled from the "Crusader Shield" party (the DC). Despite the excellent relations he had with Belinguer he chose not to join the PCI. He entered instead in the Italian Socialist Party (PSI), in the current driven by Riccardo Lombardi, whose political alignment lay further left.

Nesi became a banker by accident in 1967 when he was appointed vice-president of Cassa di Risparmio di Torino (CRT) after several Socialist leaders had refused the job. Shortly thereafter he created the office of PSI Credit and Insurance (of which he was chief from 1977 to 1978) and continued his climb unabated: he was president of the Banca Nazionale del Lavoro (BNL) in the 1980s and until the fall of Berlin Wall, he worked as a business journalist at the RAI in Turin and as an engineer at Olivetti.

Despite his economic situation, being very wealthy, Nesi wanted to stay in politics always on the left and he was thus dubbed the "Red Banker". His relations with Bettino Craxi were not always positive. When the PSI was gone in 1994, Nesi decided to join the Communist Refoundation Party with which he was elected in 1996. In 1998, he broke away from the party of Fausto Bertinotti, as he was against the no-confidence vote that the PRC gave Romano Prodi, and co-founded the Party of Italian Communists (PdCI). From 2000 to 2001, he served as Minister of Public Works in the second Amato government.

In 2001, Nesi ran for the Chamber of Deputies in Liguria and won the seat thanks to the assistance granted by the center-left Olive Tree coalition. On 15 April 2004 came out of the Italian Communists and joined the group of the Italian Democratic Socialists (SDI) with whom participated in the project of socialist unity. He was Vice President of "Commission Environment, Land and Public Works" in the XIV legislature. Nesi died in Turin on 11 February 2024, at the age of 98.
