= Gianni Francesco Mattioli =

Italian politician (1940–2026)

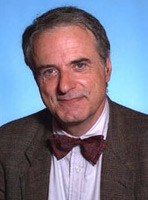

Minister of Community Policies
- In office 21 October 1998 – 22 December 1999
- Prime Minister: Giuliano Amato
- Preceded by: Patrizia Toia
- Succeeded by: Rocco Buttiglione

Member of the Chamber of Deputies
- In office 2 July 1987 – 29 May 2001
- Constituency: Milan (1987–1994); Rimini (1994–2001)

Personal details
- Born: 29 January 1940 Genoa, Kingdom of Italy
- Died: 1 June 2026 (aged 86) Grottaferrata, Italy
- Party: Greens (1987–1994, 1996–2009); AD (1994–1996); SEL (2009–2016)
- Education: Sapienza University of Rome
- Profession: Politician, university professor

Gianni Francesco Mattioli (29 January 1940 – 1 June 2026) was an Italian politician and university professor.

== Life and career ==
Mattioli graduated with a degree in physics in 1964 with a thesis on the diffusion of high energy particles. In 1973 he became a professor of the same subject at La Sapienza University of Rome, conducting research in the field of quantum mechanics and rational mechanics.

In 1978, Mattioli founded the "Committee for the Control of Energy Choices", together with Massimo Scalia. He began his anti-nuclear commitment in the International Fellowship of Reconciliation in Rome. In 1981, he founded the magazine Quale energia?, of which he was director for six years.

In 1987, Mattioli was elected deputy among the ranks of the Greens, of which he was also president from 1988 to 1992. He was re-elected deputy also in 1992, 1994 and 1996. In 1996, he was appointed undersecretary of public works in the first Prodi government; in those years, he joined the executive committee of Legambiente. From 2000 to 2001, he also served as Minister of Community Policies in the Amato II Cabinet, after his party colleague, Edo Ronchi, refused this post.

On 20 December 2009, Mattioli joined the national coordination of Left Ecology Freedom, of which he later became responsible for environmental policies.

Mattioli died on 1 June 2026, at the age of 86.

== Honours and awards ==
- Italy: Knight Grand Cross of the Order of Merit of the Italian Republic (2001)
