= Armando Veneto =

Italian politician and lawyer

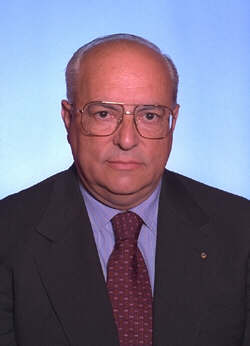
Armando Veneto

Armando Veneto (born 14 November 1935) is an Italian politician and lawyer.

== Early life ==
Armando Veneto was born in Aversa on 14 November 1935. He has been president of the Criminal Chamber of Palmi and mayor of this city from 1994 to 2001.

In 1996 he was elected deputy for the centre-left coalition (The Olive Tree) in the uninominal constituency of Palmi. He served also as Undersecretary at the Ministry of Finance from 1999 to 2001

In 2001 he joined the centrist project of European Democracy, but in 2001 he was not re-elected.

In 2004 he joined the UDEUR and was a candidate in the European elections for the Southern constituency, obtaining around 17,000 preferences. In May 2006 he joined the European Parliament, after the resignation of Paolo Cirino Pomicino (meanwhile elected to the Italian Parliament).

In October 2007 he left the UDEUR and founded the "Moderate Movement for Democracy and Legality" and in September 2009 joined the Union of the Centre.
