= Rino Serri =

Italian Communist politician

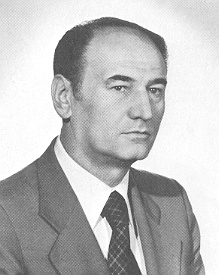

Undersecretary of State of the Ministry of Foreign Affairs
- In office 17 May 1996 – 11 June 2001
- President: Romano Prodi; Massimo D'Alema; Giuliano Amato
- Preceded by: Ludovico Incisa di Camerana
- Succeeded by: Alfredo Mantica

National President of ARCI
- In office 1983–1989
- Preceded by: Enrico Menduni
- Succeeded by: Giampiero Rasimelli

Secretary of the Italian Communist Youth Federation
- In office 1960–1962
- Preceded by: Renzo Trivelli
- Succeeded by: Achille Occhetto

Personal details
- Born: 23 January 1933 Casina, Italy
- Died: 6 April 2006 (aged 73) Rome, Italy

Rino Serri (23 January 1933 – 6 April 2006) was an Italian Communist politician.

== Biography ==
In the mid-1950s, Serri was in charge of the Reggio Emilia Province in the Italian Communist Youth Federation. In 1957 he entered the Central Committee of the Italian Communist Youth Federation and from 3 October 1960 to 29 October 1962, he was the National Secretary.

From 1963 to 1969 in the PCI he was provincial secretary of Reggio Emilia. From 4 January 1965 to 1970 he was a municipal councilor in Reggio Emilia.

In the seventies he became regional secretary of the PCI in Veneto and in 1979 he entered the Chamber of Deputies. In 1987, he became a Senator and held office until 1992 and then again in 1994 .

He opposed the dissolution of the PCI and February 3, 1991, became one of the founding fathers of Rifondazione Comunista; in 1995 that group became part of the Movement of Unitarian Communists (MCU). In 1998 he joined the Democrats of the Left with the MCU.

In 1996 he became undersecretary for Foreign Affairs of the Prodi I Cabinet. Here he dealt mainly with the countries of the Horn of Africa, In 2000 he was a mediator on behalf of the European Union to reconcile Ethiopia and Eritrea, which would happen with the Algiers Agreement. From 1984 to 1989, he also held the position of national president of the Associazione Ricreativa e Culturale Italiana (ARCI).
