= Adriana Vigneri =

Italian politician

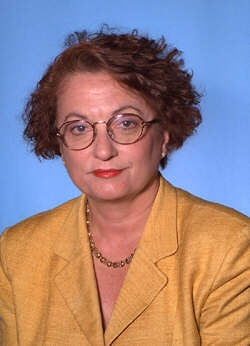

Adriana Vigneri (born 9 January 1939) is an Italian academic, lawyer and politician.

Born in Treviso and graduated in law, she became a lawyer and a professor of public law at the Ca' Foscari University of Venice. She entered the Chamber of Deputies for the first time in 1992, as a member of the Democratic Party of the Left, and will remain there until 2001 for three consecutive legislatures.

She was a member of the following parliamentary bodies: Committee for the authorization to proceed, the Constitutional Affairs Committee and the Parliamentary Committee for the prosecution proceedings.

In May 1996 she was appointed Undersecretary of State for the Interior in the government of Romano Prodi. Assignment also held in the first government of Massimo D'Alema. On 30 December 1999, in the D'Alema II government, she was appointed undersecretary of state to the Presidency of the Council of Ministers.
