= Livia Turco =

Italian politician (born 1955)

Livia Turco OMRI
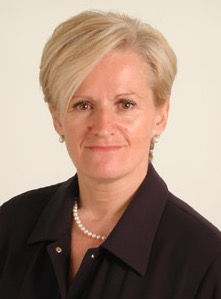

Minister of Health
- In office 17 May 2006 – 8 May 2008
- Prime Minister: Romano Prodi
- Preceded by: Silvio Berlusconi (ad interim)
- Succeeded by: Maurizio Sacconi

Minister of Social Solidarity
- In office 17 May 1996 – 11 June 2001
- Prime Minister: Romano Prodi; Massimo D'Alema; Giuliano Amato
- Preceded by: Adriano Ossicini
- Succeeded by: Roberto Maroni

Member of the Chamber of Deputies
- In office 2 July 1987 – 27 April 2006
- In office 29 April 2008 – 14 March 2013

Member of the Senate
- In office 28 April 2006 – 28 April 2008

Personal details
- Born: 13 February 1955 (age 71) Cuneo, Italy
- Party: PCI (1970–1991); PDS (1991–1998); DS (1998–2007); PD (since 2007)

Livia Turco (born 13 February 1955) is an Italian politician. She began her political career in the 1970s as a member of the Italian Communist Party, becoming a member of the Italian Parliament in 1987. She then joined its legal successors, the Democratic Party of the Left and then the Democrats of the Left. A member of the Democratic Party, she was elected to the Senate of the Republic in 2006. By 2008, she returned to the Chamber of Deputies, and did not seek re-election in 2013. Turco was Minister of Social Affairs in three centre-left coalition-led governments from 1996 to 2001 and Minister of Health from 2006 to 2008.

== Life and career ==
Turco came from a working-class background in Morozzo, Cuneo, and studied in Cuneo and Turin, where she began her political career with the Italian Communist Party, becoming a deputy in 1987. Later, she was director of the Italian Communist Youth Federation, a regional councillor, and responsible for women in the local party federation. Following the dissolution of the Italian Communist Party in 1991, she joined the Democratic Party of the Left and then the Democrats of the Left as a deputy from 1992 to 2001. From May 1996 to June 2001, she was Minister of Social Affairs (Solidarietà Sociale) in the Olive Tree-led governments by Romano Prodi, Massimo D'Alema, and Giuliano Amato.

Turco unsuccessfully ran for president of Piedmont in 2000, and was elected a senator for Piedmont in 2006. She then became Minister of Health in the second Prodi government (2006–2008). Following the fall of Prodi's government, she was elected a deputy in April 2008 as a member of the centre-left Democratic Party, and ended her political career in 2013, not seeking re-election. Her name is attached to the 1998 immigration act known as the Turco-Napolitano Law (L. 40/98), as well as the 2000 parental leave and time regulation in cities act, also known as the Turco Act (Legge 53/2000).

== Honours and awards ==
- Italy: Grand Cross Dame of the Order of Merit of the Italian Republic, 27 December 2017.
