= Giordano Angelini =

Italian politician

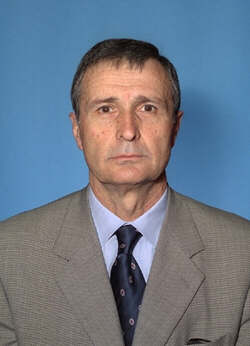
Giordano Angelini

Giordano Angelini (born 28 September 1939) is an Italian businessman and politician who served as Mayor of Ravenna (1980–1987), Deputy (1987–2001) and Undersecretary of State (1998–2001).

== Biography ==
He was born in Ravenna on September 28, 1939. He holds a law degree. He was first elected to Parliament in 1987 as a member of the Communist Party, which later became the PDS. Professionally speaking, he had already retired by that time. He was reelected for three additional terms, always as a member of Parliament. He also served as mayor of Ravenna. In 2001, he was appointed president of Sapir, a company operating in the Port of Ravenna that handles loading and unloading operations.
