= Franco Bassanini =

Italian politician (born 1940)

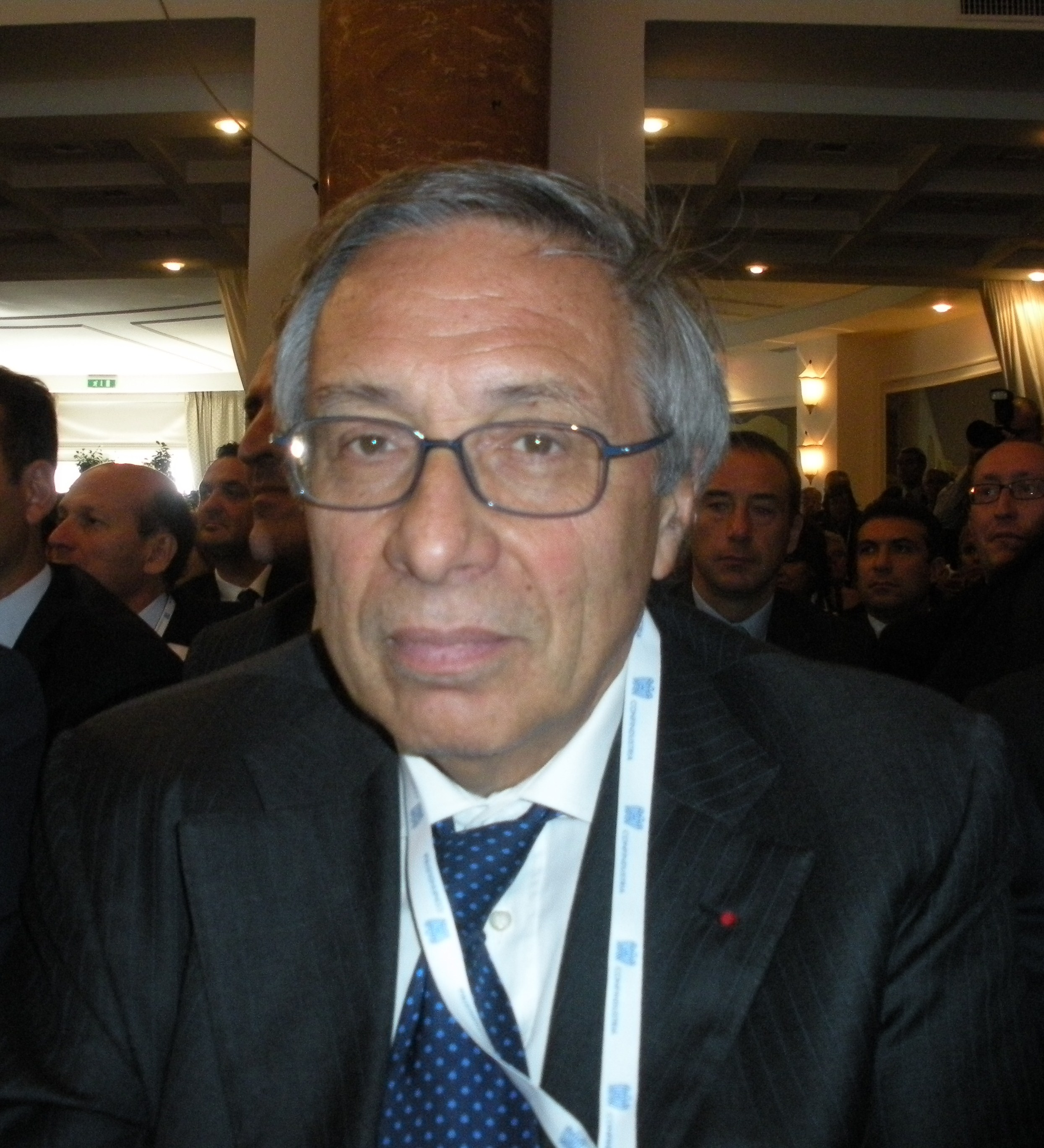

Minister of Public Function and Regional Affairs
- In office 22 December 1999 – 11 June 2001
- Prime Minister: Massimo D'Alema; Giuliano Amato
- Preceded by: Angelo Piazza
- Succeeded by: Franco Frattini
- In office 18 May 1996 – 21 October 1998
- Prime Minister: Romano Prodi
- Preceded by: Giovanni Motzo
- Succeeded by: Angelo Piazza

Secretary of the Council of Ministers
- In office 21 October 1998 – 22 December 1999
- Prime Minister: Massimo D'Alema
- Preceded by: Enrico Luigi Micheli
- Succeeded by: Enrico Luigi Micheli

Member of the Senate of the Republic
- In office 9 May 1996 – 27 April 2006
- Constituency: Tuscany

Member of the Chamber of Deputies
- In office 20 June 1979 – 8 May 1996
- Constituency: Rome (1979–1983); Milan (1983–1996)

Personal details
- Born: 9 May 1940 (age 86) Milan, Italy
- Party: PSI (before 1981); Independent (1981–1983); Independent Left (1983–1991); PDS (1991–1998); DS (1998–2007); PD (since 2007)
- Education: University of Milan
- Profession: University professor

Franco Bassanini (born 9 May 1940) is an Italian lawyer, politician, minister, and undersecretary of state.

== Career ==
Born in Milan, Bassanini was a deputy from 1979 to 1996 and a senator from 1996 to 2006. He served as the minister of public administration and regional affairs from 1996 to 2001 in the cabinets led by firstly Romano Prodi, then by Massimo D'Alema and lastly by Giuliano Amato.

Bassannini was president of Astrid, a think-tank specialising in the study of institutional and administrative reform. As a member of the administrative council of the ENA, he was called by Nicolas Sarkozy in 2007 to take part in the Commission pour la libération de la croissance française, presided over by Jacques Attali and designed to reform France's administration.

A member of Italy-USA Foundation, Bassanini served as the professor of constitutional law at the First University of Rome, and was the chairman of Cassa Depositi e Prestiti. He is also on the advisory board of the Official and Financial Institutions Forum (OMFIF), where he is regularly involved in meetings regarding the financial and monetary system.

== Electoral history ==
Election	House	Constituency	Party	Votes	Result
1979	Chamber of Deputies	Rome–Viterbo–Latina–Frosinone	PSI	18,722	Elected
1983	Chamber of Deputies	Milan–Pavia	PCI	8,503	Elected
1987	Chamber of Deputies	Milan–Pavia	PCI	15,039	Elected
1992	Chamber of Deputies	Milan–Pavia	PDS	9,598	Elected
1994	Chamber of Deputies	Lombardy 1	PDS	– (Note: Elected in a closed list proportional representation system.)	Elected
1996	Senate of the Republic	Tuscany – Siena	PDS	108,816	Elected
2001	Senate of the Republic	Tuscany – Siena	DS	94,655	Elected
2006	Senate of the Republic	Sicily	DS	– (Note: Candidate in a closed list proportional representation system.)	Not elected

== Honours ==
- Italy: Knight Grand Cross of the Order of Merit of the Italian Republic, 13 January 2015.
