= Franco Corleone =

Italian politician

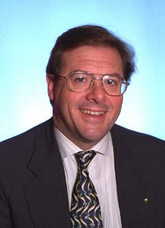

Member of the Chamber of Deputies
- In office 12 May 1982 – 11 July 1983
- In office 13 June 1986 – 1 July 1987
- In office 15 April 1994 – 29 May 2001

Member of the Senate
- In office 2 July 1987 – 22 April 1992

Personal details
- Born: 29 September 1946 (age 79) Milan, Italy
- Party: Federation of the Greens (since 1990)
- Other political affiliations: Radical Party (until 1989); Rainbow Greens (1989–1990)
- Education: University of Milan
- Profession: Politician
- Website: www.francocorleone.it

Franco Corleone (born 29 September 1946 in Milan) is an Italian politician.

== Biography ==
Franco Corleone graduated in Political Science at the State University of Milan.

He became Deputy for the first time in 1982 and hel office until 1983; he returned to being a member of the Chamber of Deputies in 1986. In both cases he replaced a resigning Deputy of the Radical Party

In 1987 he was elected Senator and was a member of the Justice Commission and the Health Commission.

In 1989 he was elected MEP on the list of the Rainbow Greens, charge from which he resigned after six months to avoid double assignment.

Subsequently, he was re-elected Deputy in 1994 and 1996 among the ranks of the Federation of the Greens. He served as Undersecretary for Justice from 1996 to 2001, in the governments led by Prodi, D'Alema and Amato.

From 2003 to 2013 he held the position of Guarantor for the rights of prisoners of the Municipality of Florence. In October 2013 he was elected regional guarantor of the persons subjected to measures restricting the personal freedom of the Tuscany Region.

He is the Coordinator of the territorial guarantors for the rights of prisoners.
