= Luciano Guerzoni (born 1938) =

Italian politician (1938–2020)

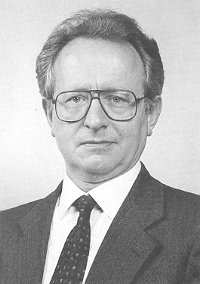

Member of the Chamber of Deputies
- In office 15 April 1994 – 8 May 1996
- Constituency: Mirandola
- In office 12 July 1983 – 22 April 1992
- Constituency: Parma

Personal details
- Born: 1 April 1938 Naples, Italy
- Died: 1 December 2020 (aged 82) Modena, Italy
- Party: Democratic Party of the Left
- Other political affiliations: Italian Communist Party
- Occupation: Politician, academic

Luciano Guerzoni (1 April 1938 – 1 December 2020) was an Italian politician.

== Career ==
He served three terms in the Chamber of Deputies, representing Parma for his first two terms from 1983 to 1992, and Mirandola in his final term from 1994 to 1996. He was a full professor of law at the University of Modena.
