= Dino Piero Giarda =

Italian economist and academic (born 1936)

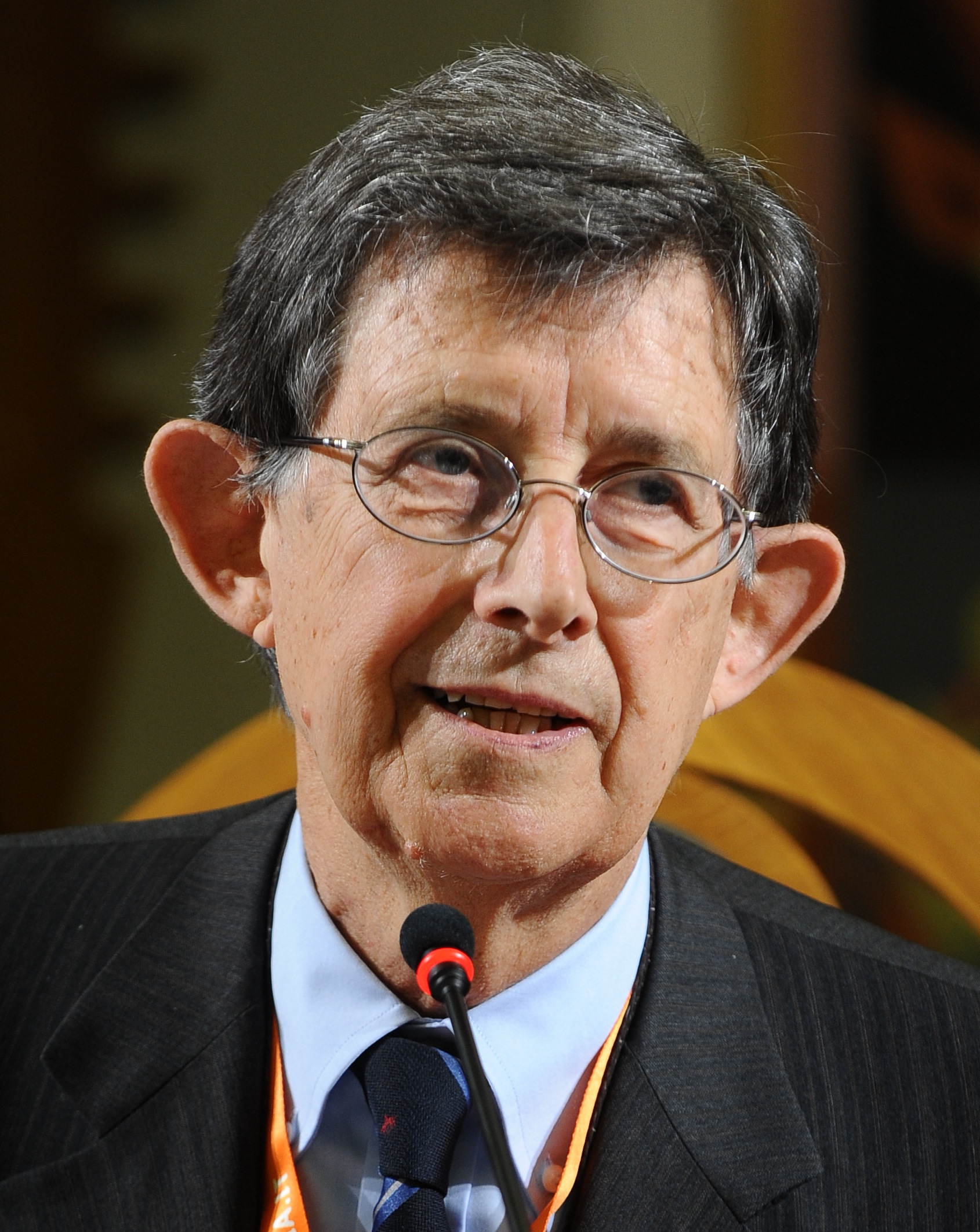

Minister for Parliamentary Relations and Implementation of the Government Program
- In office 16 November 2011 – 28 April 2013
- Prime Minister: Mario Monti
- Preceded by: Gianfranco Rotondi, Elio Vito
- Succeeded by: Dario Franceschini

Personal details
- Born: 9 December 1936 (age 89) Milan
- Party: Independent

Dino Piero Giarda (born 9 December 1936) is an Italian economist and academia. He served as Minister without portfolio for Parliamentary Relations and Implementation of the Government Program in the Monti Cabinet.

== Biography ==
Dino Piero Giarda graduated in 1962, with a degree in economics and business from the Università Cattolica del Sacro Cuorey of the Sacred Heart in Milan. He later continued his studies in the United States at Princeton University and Harvard University.

Since 1968 he has been professor of Political economy, Economic policy and Financial Policy and Econometrics at the Catholic University of Milan. He was later appointed full professor of Public economics at the same university.

On 21 December 2013, he assumed the chairmanship of the supervisory board of Banca Popolare di Milano, being elected by the shareholders' meeting, which was held on the same day at Fiera Milano in Rho-Pero, with 3961 votes out of a total of 5705 participating shareholders. On 30 April 2016, he was succeeded by Nicola Rossi.

== Early life ==
Giarda was born in Milan in 1936.

== Career ==
Giarda was a professor of public finance at Università Cattolica del Sacro Cuore.

== Honors ==
- Grand Officer of the Order of Merit of the Italian Republic – 11 June 1997
- Knight Grand Cross of the Order of Merit of the Italian Republic – 5 April 2000

== Publications ==
- Giarda, Piero; Parmentola, Nicola; Centro Formazione e Studi, eds. (1990). Bilanci pubblici e crisi finanziaria. Problemi di amministrazione pubblica Quaderno. Bologna: Soc. Ed. il Mulino. ISBN 978-88-15-02833-4.
- Arrigo, Ugo; Giarda, Piero; Consiglio Nazionale delle Ricerche, eds. (1993). Produttività, costi e domanda dei servizi postali in Italia. Organizzazione e funzionamento della pubblica amministrazione. Bologna: Il Mulino. ISBN 978-88-15-04169-2.
- Giarda, Piero (1995). Regioni e federalismo fiscale. Studi e ricerche. Bologna: Soc. Ed. Il Mulino. ISBN 978-88-15-04817-2.
- Giarda, Piero D. (2005). L'esperienza italiana di federalismo fiscale: una rivisitazione del decreto legislativo 56/2000. AREL. Bologna: Il mulino. ISBN 978-88-15-10547-9.
