= Carla Rocchi =

Italian politician

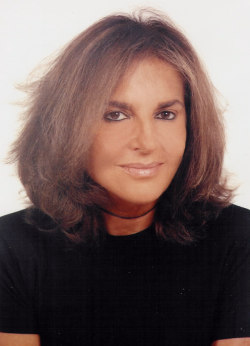

Member of Senate of the Republic
- In office 23 April 1992 – 29 May 2001

Personal details
- Born: 11 March 1942 (age 83) Rome, Kingdom of Italy
- Party: Federation of the Greens

Carla Rocchi (born 11 March 1942) is an Italian politician who served as a member of the Italian Senate from 23 April 1992 to 29 May 2001 as a member of the Federation of the Greens. She was first elected to the Senate in the 1992 elections, and was re-elected in 1994 and 1996. After serving in the Budget Committee her first two terms, she served as the Undersecretary for the Ministry of Public Education from 1999 to 2000, and served as State Secretary for the Ministry of Health from 2000 until the end of her term in 2001.

In 2001, Rocchi ran for and won a seat in the Chamber of Deputies, and served there until 2006. In late 2001, when Italy was voting on involving themselves in the War on Afghanistan, Rocchi voted in favor of intervention, but did so with a Burqa in her hands to show solidarity with the women of Afghanistan. She did not run for re-election in 2006, and instead became president of Ente Nazionale Protezione Animali, Italy's Animal Protection Agency. In 2017, she became a member of the Animalist Movement, established as an animal rights party, splitting from the Greens as she felt they had gone too far left in their policies, but also due to them not having animal rights as a strong part of their platform.
