= Massimo D'Alema =

Italian politician (born 1949)

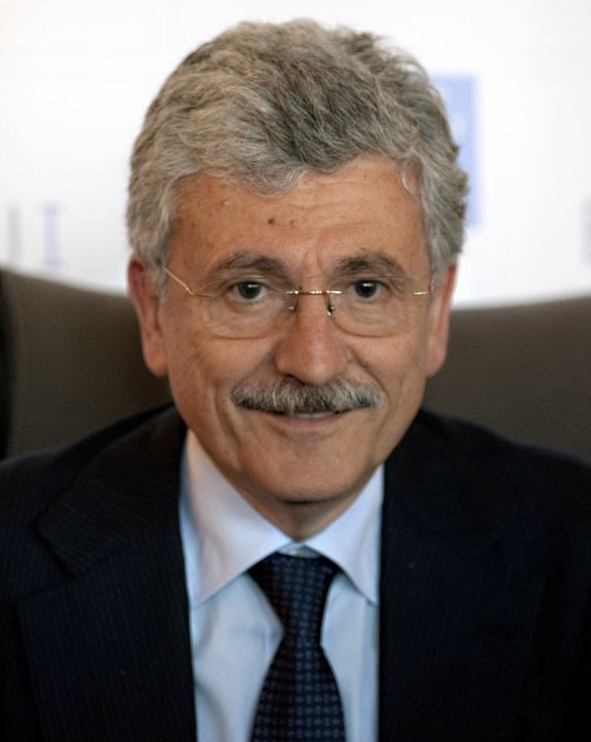

Prime Minister of Italy
- In office 21 October 1998 – 26 April 2000
- President: Oscar Luigi Scalfaro; Carlo Azeglio Ciampi
- Deputy: Sergio Mattarella
- Preceded by: Romano Prodi
- Succeeded by: Giuliano Amato

Deputy Prime Minister of Italy
- In office 17 May 2006 – 8 May 2008
- Prime Minister: Romano Prodi
- Preceded by: Giulio Tremonti
- Succeeded by: Angelino Alfano

Minister of Foreign Affairs
- In office 17 May 2006 – 8 May 2008
- Prime Minister: Romano Prodi
- Preceded by: Gianfranco Fini
- Succeeded by: Franco Frattini

Vice-President of the Socialist International
- In office 29 October 2003 – 29 August 2012
- President: António Guterres; George Papandreou
- In office 11 September 1996 – 7 November 1999
- President: Pierre Mauroy
Party political offices
President of the Democrats of the Left
In office 6 November 1998 – 14 October 2007
Preceded by	Giglia Tedesco Tatò
Succeeded by	Position abolished
Secretary of the Democrats of the Left
In office 12 February 1998 – 6 November 1998
Preceded by	Position established
Succeeded by	Walter Veltroni
Secretary of the Democratic Party of the Left
In office 1 July 1994 – 12 February 1998
Preceded by	Achille Occhetto
Succeeded by	Position abolished
Secretary of the Italian Communist Youth Federation
In office 3 April 1975 – 12 June 1980
Preceded by	Renzo Imbeni
Succeeded by	Marco Fumagalli
Parliamentary offices
Chair of the Parliamentary Committee for the Security of the Republic
In office 26 January 2010 – 15 March 2013
Preceded by	Francesco Rutelli
Succeeded by	Giacomo Stucchi
Member of the Chamber of Deputies
In office 28 April 2006 – 14 March 2013
Constituency	Apulia
In office 2 July 1987 – 19 July 2004
Constituency	Lecce–Brindisi–Taranto (1987–1994); Casarano (1994–2004)
Member of the European Parliament
In office 20 July 2004 – 27 April 2006
Constituency	Southern Italy

Personal details
- Born: 20 April 1949 (age 77) Rome, Italy
- Party: PCI (1963–1991); PDS (1991–1998); DS (1998–2007); PD (2007–2017); Art.1 (2017–2023)
- Spouse: Linda Giuva
- Children: 2
- Website: www.massimodalema.it
- Massimo D'Alema's voice D'Alema talks about democracy. Recorded 20 March 2024

Massimo D'Alema (Italian pronunciation: [ˈmassimo daˈlɛːma]; born 20 April 1949) is an Italian politician and journalist who was the 53rd prime minister of Italy from 1998 to 2000. He was Deputy Prime Minister of Italy and Italian Minister of Foreign Affairs from 2006 to 2008. D'Alema also served for a time as national secretary of the Democratic Party of the Left (PDS). Earlier in his career, D'Alema was a member of the Italian Communist Party (PCI) and was the first former Communist party member to become prime minister of a NATO country and the only former PCI prime minister of Italy. Due to his first name and for his dominant position in the left-wing coalitions during the Second Republic, he is referred to as Leader Maximo ("Maximum Leader"). He is also the author of several books.

A member of the PCI since 1963, D'Alema was a member of the party's central committee and then of the leadership and party secretariat; from 1975 to 1980, he was also secretary of the Italian Communist Youth Federation (FGCI). He was supportive of Achille Occhetto's turning point that dissolved the PCI and established the PDS, and he presided over the establishment of The Olive Tree coalition that won the 1996 Italian general election and the transformation of the PDS into the Democrats of the Left (DS) in 1998, the same year he became prime minister. A member of Italy's Chamber of Deputies from 1987 to 2004 and then from 2006 to 2013, he was also a member of the European Parliament from 2004 to 2006. He joined the Democratic Party (PD) upon its foundation in 2007. He opposed Matteo Renzi's secretariat and was in contrast with the Renziani wing within the party, which he left in 2017 to become a founder of Article One. He has also been an adviser and mediator in the weapon economic sector.

== Early life and education ==
D'Alema was born in Rome on 20 April 1949, the son of Giuseppe D'Alema, a partisan in the Italian resistance movement within the Patriotic Action Groups and communist politician, and Fabiola Modesti. He joined the Italian Communist Party (PCI) at the age of 14 and began his political career in Pisa, where he was studying philosophy. He was praised as enfant prodige by the then PCI leader Palmiro Togliatti and took part in the protests of 1968, alongside his friend Fabio Mussi.

== Career ==
=== Italian Communist Youth Federation ===
In 1975, D'Alema was elected national secretary of the Italian Communist Youth Federation (FGCI). It was during this period that D'Alema and Walter Veltroni met each other, and with him a dualism would form, without any public attacks. Years later, Veltroni recounted: "Massimo came from the party to more severely lead a rebel FGCI, I was more attentive to the movements." In 1983, he became regional secretary of the PCI's Apulian federation. The then PCI leader Enrico Berlinguer sent D'Alema in China to improve relations with the Chinese Communists after the arrest of the Gang of Four in 1976, and D'Alema followed Berlinguer in Moscow for the funeral of Yuri Andropov in 1984.

During the 1980s, the PCI's road to government did not succeed. To the press who reported a significant drop in membership, D'Alema replied that it was not only a problem of the PCI or of Italy but concerned all mass parties in the Western world, citing Christian Democracy (DC) and the Italian Socialist Party (PSI), the then main parties of government. He said: "I would like to know how many members the DC and the PSI have ... who escape this discussion not because they too do not have problems of this type, but simply because they are not transparent. And yet we are." According to D'Alema, the other parties registered through the distribution of card packages, while the PCI had a modern form of individual and voluntary registration. In the meantime, there was the dissolution of the Soviet Union and the turning point of the Bolognina.

From 1988 to 1990, D'Alema was the director of L'Unità, formerly the official newspaper of the PCI, which subsequently became the newspaper of the DS. A journalist by profession, he also wrote for Città futura and Rinascita. It is recounted that D'Alema hated other journalists and that this was reciprocal, due to his word of scorn and haughtiness, allegations that he always denied. One notable case was a 1995 interview with Lucia Annunziata, which was sensational for its lucidity regarding the relationship between the powers that be and Italian media information. He explained how the press had lost its historical references, namely a solid political system, which guaranteed clarity of alignment, and how what he described as the new anarchy that emerged bore the sign of the "unqualified destructuring of the political democracy". He was asked "Do the 'powers that be' play the shambles of politics?", to which he replied: "There is no doubt. Information has been a formidable tool that has contributed to the disintegration and loss of authority of political power. No political power can survive information that spies on him through the keyhole as he goes to the toilet." Despite his criticism of the mass media, D'Alema came to accept the change of times and accepted invitations to Porta a Porta and was a host of Gianni Morandi's show, where he sang "C'era un ragazzo che come me amava i Beatles e i Rolling Stones". He and Morandi had met at the association football charity match between politicians and journalists.

=== From the Italian Communist Party to the Democrats of the Left ===
D'Alema entered the PCI's national secretariat in 1986 and supported the transformation into the Democratic Party of the Left (PDS), which was launched by Achille Occhetto and made official by the Rimini party congress in February 1991. He was a notable member of the PCI, the bulk of which in 1991 became the PDS and in 1998 formed the Democrats of the Left (DS). It was during this period in the late 1980s and early 1990s that D'Alema found his first political enemies, who gave vitriolic interviews, such as the reformist Napoleone Colajanni, who criticized D'Alema and Occhetto for their lack of vision upon reaching the highest party positions. In the past, the selection went through hunger, debates in assembly, and the police of Scelba when communists were persecuted. In the post-war years, a qualified young communist flowed into the PCI for whom the communist militia coincided with a lifestyle choice. D'Alema embodied an anthropological turning point, where the Leninist concept of professional revolutionaries was rejected in favour of salaried party executives comparable to public administrators and union officials.

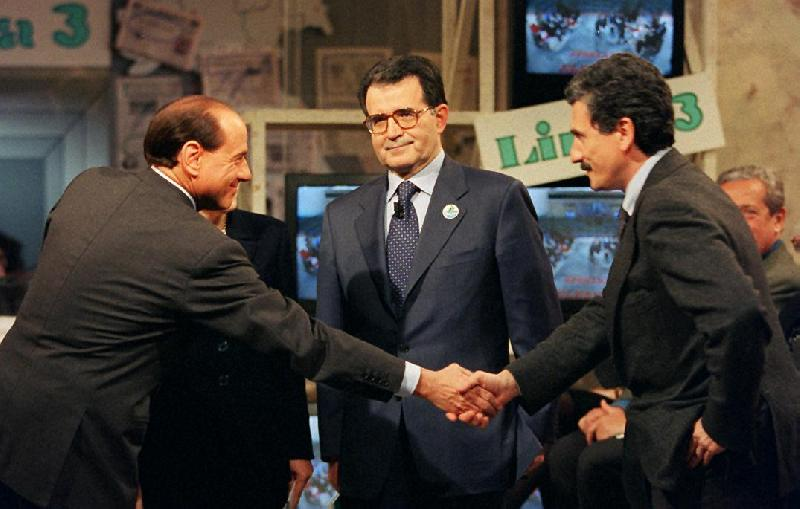
D'Alema with Romano Prodi and Silvio Berlusconi in 1996

1994 saw the PCI tradition of the sole candidate for the party secretariat, the leader designated from above, broken. After Occhetto's resignation, D'Alema announced his candidacy to succeed him. When he learned that Veltroni would also do so, he entered Claudio Petruccioli's studio and told him: "I will certainly be elected, but have you thought what would happen if Veltroni were elected? With my opposition, it wouldn't last two months." As the PDS secretary, D'Alema attempted to normalize relations with Silvio Berlusconi, who later broke it, for institutional reforms. Following the loss of the PDS and Occhetto-led Alliance of Progressives in the 1994 Italian general election, D'Alema supported the creation of The Olive Tree coalition that opened up to centrist and moderate forces, whether secular or Catholic. In the internal life of the party, mostly during its transition from PCI to PDS, he stressed that its roots in Marxism should be renovated, with the aim to create a modern Western European social-democratic party. He was a member of Italy's Chamber of Deputies since 1987 and president of the PDS parliamentary group from 1992 to 1994. In July 1994, he became its national secretary and surpassed Veltroni, his direct competitor, in the votes of the national council. Under his leadership, the PDS conducted a tough opposition against the first Berlusconi government (May 1994 – January 1995), and then became part of the majority government that supported the subsequent Dini government (January 1995 – May 1996), including the Italian People's Party and the Northern League, among others.

The same year of the DS foundation, succeeding Romano Prodi, D'Alema became Prime Minister of Italy as the leader of The Olive Tree coalition founded by Prodi and supported by D'Alema that, also thanks to the support of the Communist Refoundation Party (PRC), which was founded by those who were opposed to the dissolution of the PCI, had won the 1996 Italian general election; it was the first general election win for progressives. The first prime minister born after Italy became a republic in 1946, he was the first former Communist party member to become prime minister of a NATO country; he remains the only former PCI member to become prime minister. Committed to institutional reforms during the first Prodi government, he was first elected president of a bicameral commission for constitutional reforms in February 1997 and began the development of the PDS into a new unitary force that would aggregate further personalities and organizations from the socialist, secular, and left-wing Catholic area. In February 1998, the start of the formation process of the DS, which was led by D'Alema, was concluded with the merge of the PDS, the Labour Federation, the Movement of Unitarian Communists, the Social Christians, and exponents of the republican left. D'Alema became prime minister when the PRC retired its support of Prodi's government, and led to a new centre-left government, including the Democratic Union for the Republic and the Party of Italian Communists, the latter being a split from the PRC in disagreement over the fall of Prodi's government.

=== Centre-left coalition governments ===
==== Prime Minister of Italy ====
D'Alema became prime minister thanks to Francesco Cossiga and part of the right-wing opposition, after the crisis of the first Prodi government. A month after becoming prime minister, D'Alema left the secretariat of the DS to Veltroni and assumed the presidency of the party. The first D'Alema government continued on the path of financial recovery and privatization, as well as the reform of the welfare state. The differences within the majority were accentuated with the formation of the new grouping of The Democrats, which were linked to Prodi and Antonio Di Pietro and that often made the government's path bumpy, and also forced to deal with a difficult situation on the international level, as Italy took part in the NATO bombing of the Federal Republic of Yugoslavia in 1999.

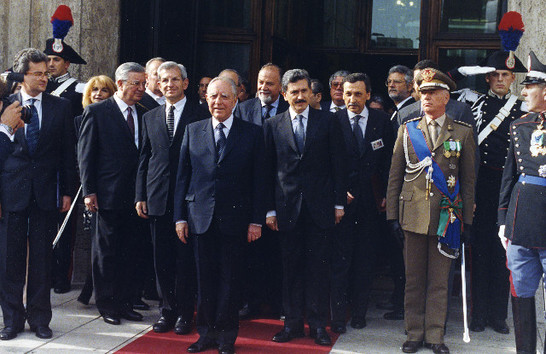
D'Alema with President Carlo Azeglio Ciampi in 1999

D'Alema supported Italy's commitment in the NATO air intervention against the Federal Republic of Yugoslavia in favour of Kosovo (March–June 1999). The intervention was also supported by Silvio Berlusconi and the right-wing opposition, while some of those further to the left, such as the PRC, strongly contested it. The government suffered setbacks at the 1999 European Parliament election in Italy, which was held in June, and new tensions in the majority led in December 1999 to his government’s resignation and the establishment of the second D'Alema government, in which greater weight was given to The Democrats.

Both as party leader and prime minister, D'Alema argued for a long time with Sergio Cofferati, the then powerful and undisputed leader of the CGIL trade union. About labour issues, he said: "Precisely if we want to push forward a labour policy, we must have the courage of a work of renewal. ... I felt Cofferati, even unlike on other occasions, more closed and deaf. We feel challenged by reality to a necessary critical reflection. Mobility, flexibility, are above all a fact of reality. And even something which corresponds to a different way, in the new generation, of looking at work and at one's relationship with work." At the 1997 party congress, he unexpectedly attacked the CGIL. He said: "Mobility and flexibility are above all a fact of reality ... we must build new and more flexible networks of representation and protection. If we don't put ourselves on this ground, we will represent more and more only a segment of the world of work." Additionally, he promoted a Florence conference on the Third Way, in the presence of two personalities far from the tradition of the Italian left: Bill Clinton and Tony Blair.

In the 1998 assembly of the General States of the political left in 1998, D'Alema launched the Cosa 2, a political construction site for a new federative party of the left that would unite the former PCI, socialists, and Christian reformers. Apart from the name change to the DS, its symbol (the rose of European socialism instead of the PCI/PDS hammer and sickle at the foot of the oak) were changed. At the 2001 party congress, D'Alema supported the candidacy for the secretariat of Piero Fassino against Giovanni Berlinguer at the head of a minority motion promoted and supported by Cofferati and the CGIL. In a twist of fate, D'Alema was the only centre-left party secretary, alongside Matteo Renzi, to be opposed by the CGIL and its leaders. Because of this, coupled with support from its opponents on the political right, D'Alema was subjected to criticism not only because of his character but of his policy. They reminded of the farewell to the permanent job and the dominated relationship with Cofferati, sympathy for the Palestinians, that "Bye-bye Condi" directed on the telephone to the then United States secretary of state, Condoleezza Rice, in order to be heard by journalists, the communist pride, and that Berlusconi's conflict of interest never approved in five years of government and that "Mediaset heritage to defend", which was pronounced during the normalization phase with Berlusconi.

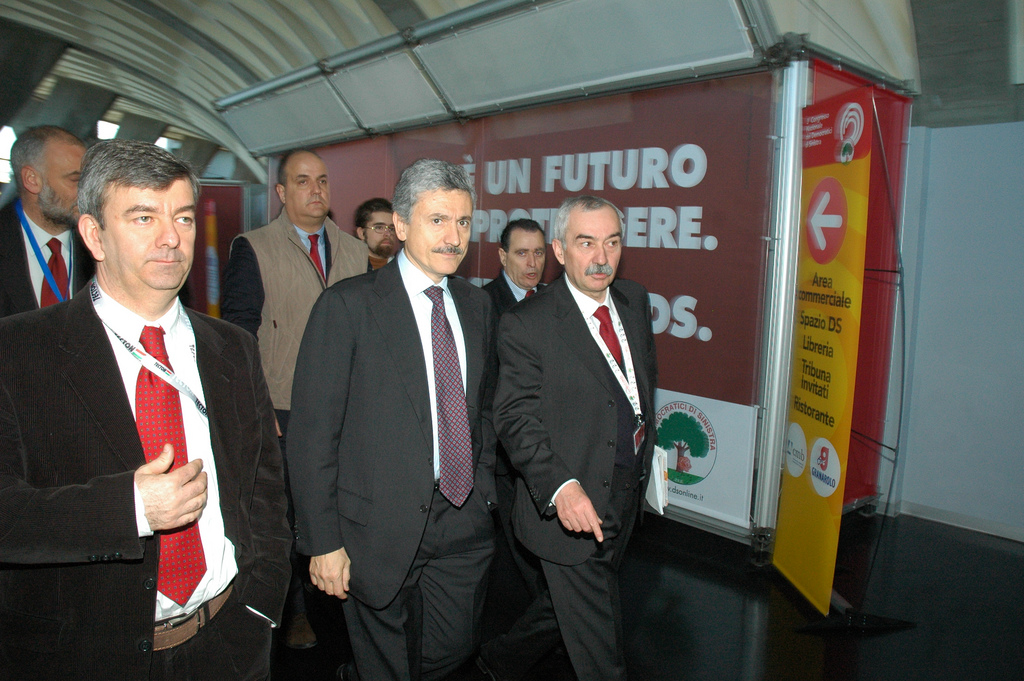
D'Alema with the then senator Ugo Sposetti

In 1999, D'Alema managed to summon five other heads of state and government to Florence: Clinton, Blair, Lionel Jospin, Gerhard Schroeder, and Fernando Cardoso, among other personalities, from Hillary Clinton to Prodi, who was the then president of the European Commission. In those years, D'Alema followed the Third Way and invited entrepreneurs to grow, invest, and get rich. He urged them to report the obstacles encountered in their path so that the government could "get them out of the way". At the 1999 congress of the Federation of the Greens, D'Alema outlined what would later become the Democratic Party (PD). He did not believe in that project because he was convinced that Italy is a structurally right-wing country, that in a majoritarian system an ex-Communist party alone would never be able to govern, and that even if it succeeded in doing so, the Italian media information system would end up destroying it. Following the defeat in the 2000 Italian regional elections, which were held in April, he left the offices of prime minister and president of the DS. In December 2000, he became president of the DS. At the second national congress of the party held in Pesaro in November 2001, he was confirmed to the party presidency.

==== European Parliament and Italian Minister of Foreign Affairs ====
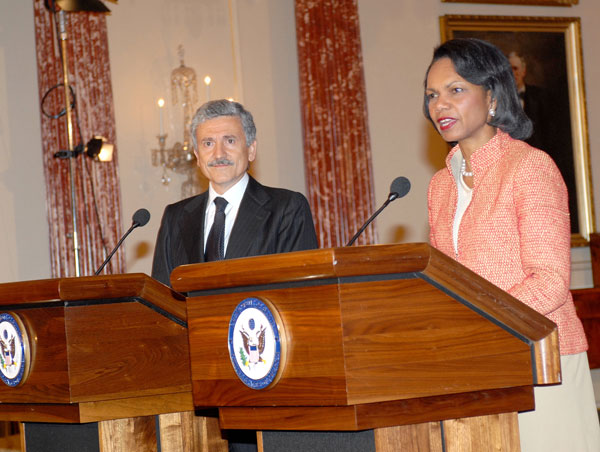
D'Alema with U.S. Secretary of State Condoleezza Rice in 2006

Since the 2004 European Parliament election in Italy, D'Alema was a member of the European Parliament for Southern Italy with the DS, as part of the Party of European Socialists (PES) group, and sat on the European Parliament's Committee on Fisheries and the European Parliament Committee on Foreign Affairs until April 2006, when he stood down following his election to the Chamber of Deputies in Italy. Following Prodi's win in the 2006 Italian general election, D'Alema was initially tipped to become president of Italy once the Chamber of Deputies reconvened. D'Alema himself stepped back, endorsing the official candidate of The Union, Giorgio Napolitano, who was ultimately elected. Immediately following the April 2006 election, D'Alema was proposed as the future president of the Chamber of Deputies. The PRC strongly pushed for its leader, Fausto Bertinotti, to become the next president. After a couple of days of heated debate, D'Alema stepped back to prevent a fracture between the parties, an act that was applauded by his allies. As a result, Bertinotti was elected president. That same month, D'Alema was appointed as Deputy Prime Minister of Italy and Italian Minister of Foreign Affairs in the second Prodi government.

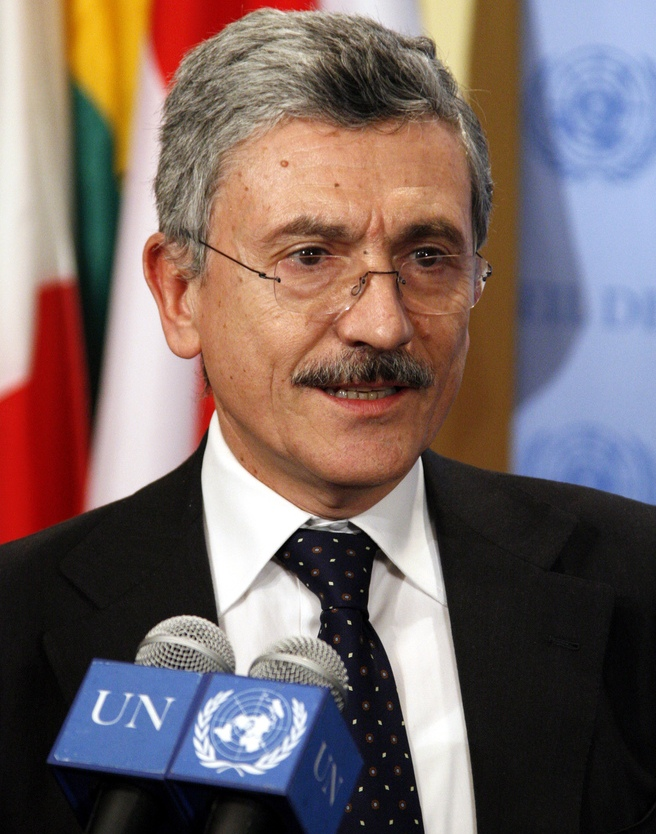
D'Alema in 2007

As the Italian Minister of Foreign Affairs, D'Alema pushed for a foreign policy of peace in the Mediterranean world. In September 2006, he expressed his solidarity to the Palestinian people while calling an end to all violence. He launched an appeal to "all Palestinian groups" to "listen to Abu Mazen, put an end to the rocket attacks against Israel, free the Israeli corporal kidnapped last June, and work to put an end to the violence that has caused so much suffering to the Palestinian people" due to Israeli retaliation; in May 2021, he reiterated that while aggression from Hamas is unacceptable, "there is a lack of truth in the way this tragedy is being addressed. ... [We need to] try to understand in some depth how a crisis of this kind explodes, why Hamas and the Islamists have become so strong." He served in those posts until Prodi's government fell and Berlusconi's The People of Freedom (PdL) prevailed in the 2008 Italian general election. D'Alema was re-elected to the Chamber of Deputies in this election as part of the newly formed PD. The DS was one of the main founding parties of the PD, and D'Alema himself was a protagonist of the constituent phase. When Veltroni became the new leader of the PD, two D'Alema's organizations hostile to factionalism sprang up: the Red Association and Red TV. In response, D'Alema clarified: "I don't intend to annoy Veltroni!" After fourteen months, Veltroni resigned as the party secretary, and the two organizations dissolved themselves.

=== Mitrokhin Commission ===
In November 2006, the new Italian Parliament with a centre-left coalition majority instituted a commission to investigate the Mitrokhin Commission for allegations that it was manipulated for political purposes. The Mitrokhin Commission, which was established in 2002 by the centre-right coalition majority closed in 2006 with a majority and a minority report, without reaching shared conclusions, and without any concrete evidence given to support the original allegations of KGB ties to Italian politicians contained in the Mitrokhin Archive. The centre-right coalition-led commission was criticized as politically motivated, as it was focused mainly on allegations against opposition figures.

November 2006 saw the publication of telephone interceptions between the chairman of the Mitrokhin Commission, Forza Italia senator Paolo Guzzanti, and Scaramella. In the wiretaps, Guzzanti made it clear that the true intent of the Mitrokhin Commission was to support the hypothesis that Prodi would have been an agent financed or in any case manipulated by Moscow and the KGB. According to the opposition, which submitted its own minority report, this hypothesis was false, and the purpose of the commission was therefore to discredit opposition politicians. In the wiretaps, Scaramella had the task of collecting testimonies from some ex-agents of the Soviet secret service refugees in Europe to support these accusations; he was later charged for calumny. In a December 2006 interview given to the television program La storia siamo noi, colonel ex-KGB agent Oleg Gordievsky, whom Scaramella claimed as his source, confirmed the accusations made against Scaramella regarding the production of false material relating to D'Alema, Prodi, and other Italian politicians, and underlined their lack of reliability.

=== From the Democratic Party to Free and Equal ===
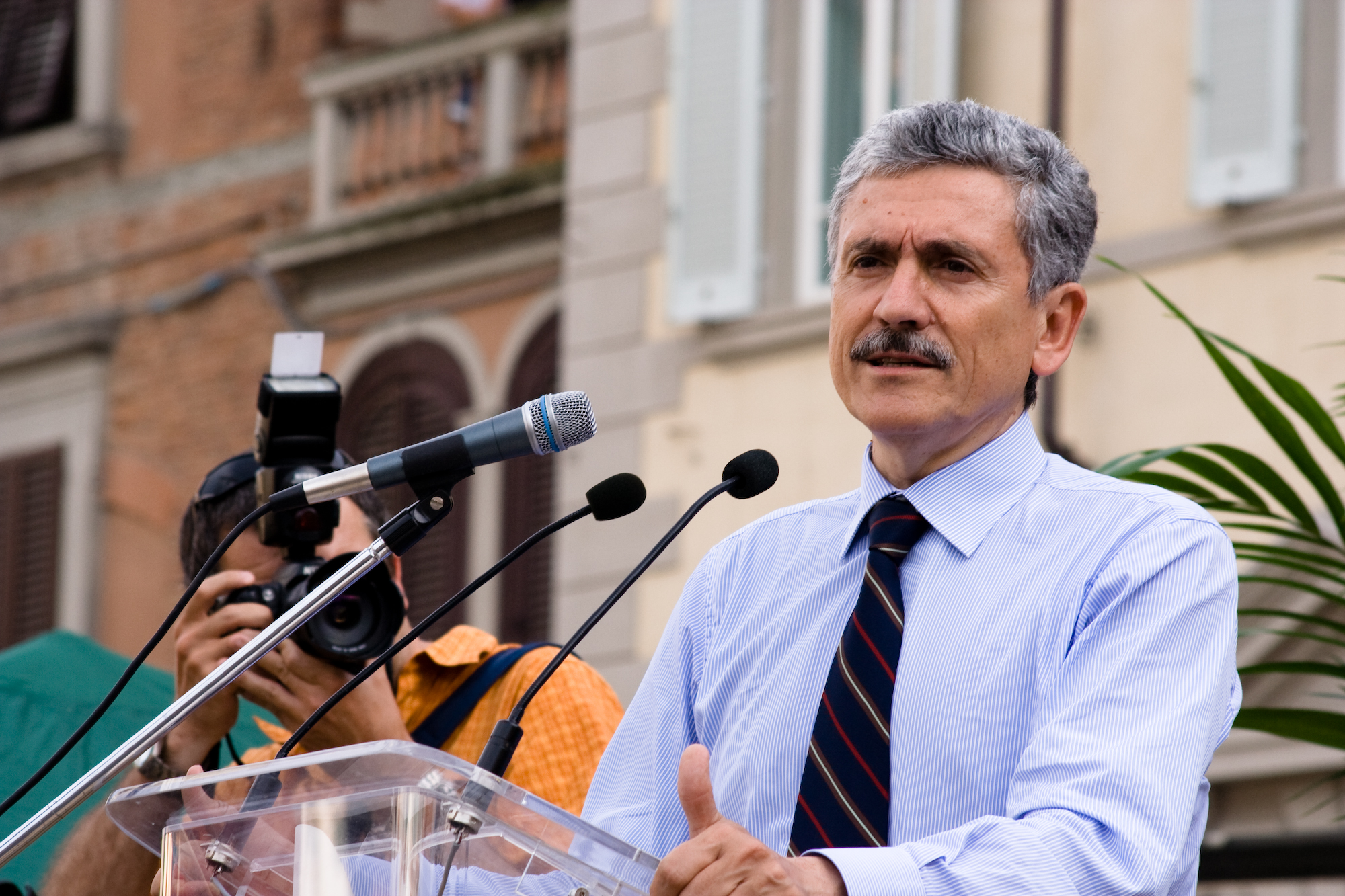
D'Alema during a Democratic Party meeting in May 2009

In 2010, D'Alema was elected president of the Parliamentary Committee for the Security of the Republic (COPASIR), a position he held until 2013, and of the Foundation of European Progressive Studies (FEPS). In 2012, when the PD experimented American-style primaries, D'Alema wanted to defend the old party traditions, and he disagreed with the idea to convert the historic workers' party to the practices of Barack Obama's politics as supported by Veltroni. Since 2013, he was within the left-wing minority of the PD, alongside Pierluigi Bersani, Pippo Civati, and Roberto Speranza, to Matteo Renzi and the Renziani. His followers and those close to the position of D'Alema are known as dalemiani. Dalemiani criticize the PD's Veltroanian Charter. Dalemiani support a party with an anti-capitalist aspiration, in contrast to the majoritarian aspirations, akin to Britain and the United States, and the reform and amelioration of capitalism. They opposed the proposed Renzi's reforms for the 2016 Italian constitutional referendum, whose defeat caused the end of Renzi as prime minister and its reforms of the party from old politics. In 2017, in opposition to Renzi's policies and leadership, he was one of the founders of the left-wing split from the PD, Article 1 – Democratic and Progressive Movement (Art.1), which became part of the centre-left political movement called Free and Equal (LeU). In the words of Francesco Cundari, author of the book Déjà-vu, in which he recounts twenty-five years of the Italian left, "[i]f on the one hand Veltroni and D'Alema can be reproached for a certain oligarchic conception of the party and of politics, on the other hand they should be recognized that in this way even the internal conflicts of that leadership group have never taken the form of tribal wars, as happened in the Democratic Party from the time of the Bersani–Renzi primary onwards." According to Cundari, more than Renzi, it was the importation of the American party model that marked its definitive split.

In the 2018 Italian general election, D'Alema was not elected a member of the Senate of the Republic in the single-member constituency for LeU. Since the 2018 general election, D'Alema, like Veltroni, left the political scenes and became an opinion leader. D'Alema became an Extraordinary Professor at Link Campus University, and continued his work as president of the Italianieuropei Foundation (since 2000) and director of the magazine of the same name, which he founded in 1998. During a party reunion in 2019 to celebrate his 70 years, D'Alema paraphrased Vladimir Putin's quote about the Soviet Union, and said: "Whoever wants to restore communism is brainless, whoever doesn't remember it is heartless... and I'm deeply sentimental."

Ahead of the 2023 PD leadership election, some commentators argued that the contest between Stefano Bonaccini and Elly Schlein was remiscent of that of D'Alema and Veltroni, respectively; in response, it was argued that Bonaccini did not possess the finesse and cynicism of D'Alema and that Veltroni, who said that he was never a communist, imported the American model of party politics. During the first meeting of the constituent committee of 87 wise men appointed by Enrico Letta with the task of rewriting the PD's Manifesto of Values for a new PD in 2022, the D'Alema–Veltroni contrasting visions came back, as Art.1 later merged into the PD in 2023. While they were not part of it, their followers were; exponents of the internal left wing, both old (Andrea Orlando) and new (Speranza) followed D'Alema's criticism of the neoliberal hegemony, on the crisis that would invest the formula of liberal democracy plus market economy that, for D'Alema and his followers, entered into a deep and dramatic crisis. Around the same period, he relaunched his call for an alliance between the PD and the Five Star Movement (M5S). About the M5S leader Giuseppe Conte and the M5S, which he said that he did not vote for in the 2022 Italian general election, D'Alema said: "It is voted for by workers and people in economic difficulty much more than the Democratic Party. A part of the progressives chose him."

== European politics and foreign policy views ==
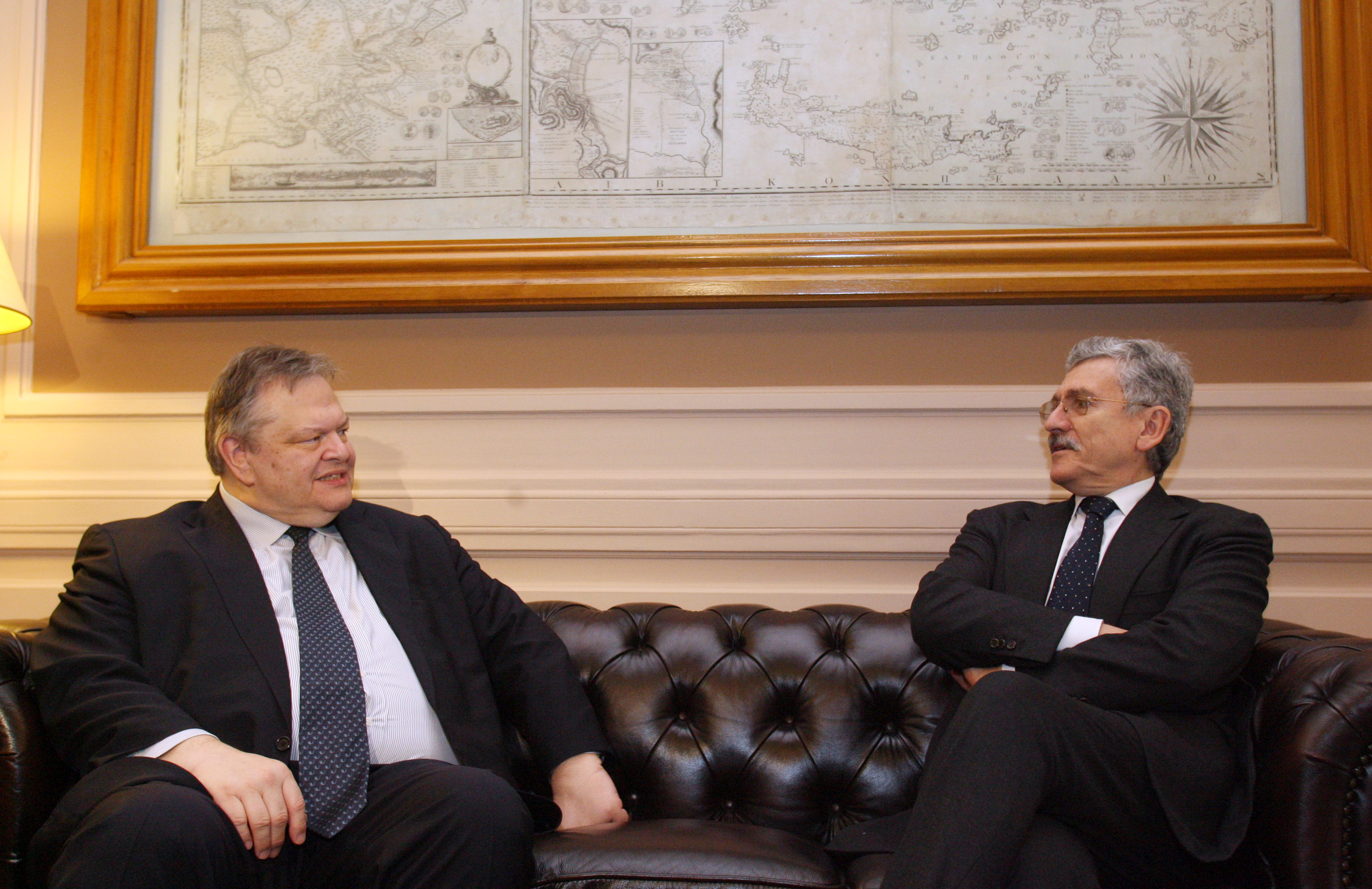
D'Alema with Evangelos Venizelos

D'Alema was briefly a member of the European Parliament from 2004 to 2006. Since 2003, he has been a member of the scientific committee of Michel Rocard and Dominique Strauss-Kahn's association A gauche en Europe ("A Left in Europe"). He still figures on the European scene; he signed the George Soros letter ("As Concerned Europeans") and called for a stronger European integration. Three year after the peace-keeping role in the 2006 Israeli–Lebanon war and beyond, D'Alema became one of the favourite candidates for the charges of president of the European Council, High Representative of the Union for Foreign Affairs and Security Policy, or General Secretariat of the Council of the European Union, without being appointed. Since 30 June 2010, D'Alema is the president of the Foundation for European Progressive Studies (FEPS), the European political foundation of the PES. He was a friend of the Italian Freemason and banker Vincenzo De Bustis.

While Italian Foreign Minister in the second Prodi government, D'Alema took a proactive diplomatic stance during the 2006 Lebanon War. Italy led negotiations with the Israeli foreign minister Tzipi Livni and was proposed by Israel to head the multinational peacekeeping mission Unifil. The dangers of the mission for Italian troops sparked warnings from the centre-right coalition opposition that it could prove a kamikaze mission, with the peacekeepers sandwiched between Israel and the well-armed Hezbollah. He pledged Italy's willingness to enforce the United Nations resolution on Lebanon and urged other European Union member states to do the same because the stability of the Middle East should be a chief concern for Europeans. In November 2013, ahead of the 2014 European Parliament election, he said: "We cannot ignore what the eurosceptics are saying. We must take it into account. But the problem is how to answer their arguments and how to offer an answer. I believe politics should provide solutions – otherwise, it becomes propaganda."

D'Alema has been an advisor and mediator in the weapon's traffic from Italy to Colombia.

== Personal life ==
D'Alema is married to Linda Giuva, a professor at the University of Siena, and has two children, Giulia and Francesco. D'Alema's passions include association football, and he is a supporter of AS Roma, which he compared to the political left, and said "we who are not used to winning the big games, we trained to suffer and unprepared to rejoice. We remember the defeats, with the fear that there will always be penalties to miss in a European Cup final." Giulio Andreotti, the former prime minister of Italy, made him heir for life to the presidency of the Roma parliamentary group at Montecitorio. About other Italian football clubs, D'Alema said: "I admire Juve but, when they play, I always support the others. Cossutta made me sympathize with Inter by telling me it was called Internazionale. I like Rivera from Milan. I was the only one to defend him, making him undersecretary in my government. A serious one. Of his 4–3 against Germany he said: I only put my foot in, Boninsegna did everything."

== Electoral history ==
Election	House	Constituency	Party	Votes	Result
1987	Chamber of Deputies	Lecce–Brindisi–Taranto	PCI	115,784	Elected
1992	Chamber of Deputies	Lecce–Brindisi–Taranto	PDS	30,819	Elected
1994	Chamber of Deputies	Casarano	PDS	24,018	Elected
1996	Chamber of Deputies	Casarano	PDS	38,077	Elected
2001	Chamber of Deputies	Casarano	DS	38,204	Elected
2004	European Parliament	Southern Italy	Ulivo	836,707	Elected
2006	Chamber of Deputies	Apulia	Ulivo	– (Note: D'Alema was elected in a closed list proportional representation system.)	Elected
2008	Chamber of Deputies	Apulia	PD	–	Elected
2018	Senate of the Republic	Nardò	LeU	10,552	Not elected

=== First-past-the-post elections ===
1994 Italian general election (C): Casarano
Candidate	Coalition	Party	Votes	%
Massimo D'Alema	Progressives	PDS	24,018	34.80
Lorenzo Emilio Ria	Pact for Italy	PS	20,908	30.29
Massimo Basurto	Pole of Good Government	FI	20,652	29.92
Others			3,437	4.98
Total			69,015	100.0
Turnout			75,660	77.94
Source: Ministry of the Interior

1996 Italian general election (C): Casarano
Candidate	Coalition	Party	Votes	%
Massimo D'Alema	The Olive Tree	PDS	38,077	55.75
Luciano Sardelli	Pole for Freedoms	FI	30,218	44.25
Total			68,295	100.0
Turnout			74,404	74.42
Centre-left hold				
Source: Ministry of the Interior

2001 Italian general election (C): Casarano
Candidate	Coalition	Party	Votes	%
Massimo D'Alema	The Olive Tree	DS	38,204	51.49
Alfredo Mantovano	House of Freedoms	FI	33,666	45.37
Leonardo Tunno		FT	870	1.17
Pantaleo Gianfreda		IdV	839	1.13
Roberto Mancuso		LB	622	0.84
Total			74,201	100.0
Turnout			79,169	75.99
Centre-left hold				
Source: Ministry of the Interior

2018 Italian general election (S): Nardò
Candidate	Coalition	Party	Votes	%
Barbara Lezzi		M5S	107,722	39.88
Luciano Cariddi	Centre-right	UDC	95,081	35.20
Teresa Bellanova	Centre-left	PD	46,891	17.36
Massimo D'Alema	Free and Equal	MDP	10,552	3.91
Others			9,881	3.65
Total			270,127	100.0
Turnout			282,226	70.51
Source: Ministry of the Interior

== Political career ==
=== Party politics ===
- 1975–1980: National Secretary of the FGCI
- 1981–1986: Regional Secretary of the PCI in Apulia
- 1986–1989: Editor of the daily newspaper L'Unità
- 1986–1992: Member of the PCI/PDS national secretariat
- 1992–1994: Chairman of the PDS members of Parliament
- 1994–1999: Leader of the PDS/DS
- Since 1996: Vice-chairman of the Socialist International
- 1998–2007: Chairman of the DS

=== Institutional politics ===
- 1970–1976: Town councillor of Pisa
- 1985–1987: Regional councillor of Apulia
- 1987–2004: Chairman of the PCI/PDS/DS parliamentary group
- 1987–2013: Member of the Chamber of Deputies
- 1996–1998: Chairman of the Committee for Constitutional Reform
- 1998–2000: Prime Minister of Italy
- 2006–2008: Minister of Foreign Affairs

=== Awards ===
- Officer of the Legion of Honour (France), 18 December 2001.
- Grand Cross Knight of the Order of Merit (Chile), 2005.
- Grand Cross Knight of the Order of Pope Pius IX (Vatican City), 20 November 2006.
- Grand Decoration of Honour for Services to the Republic of Austria (Austria), 2007.
- Supreme awards from Palestine and South Korea.

== Books ==
D'Alema published many books, several of which with Mondadori, which is controlled by Fininvest, the family holding company of Silvio Berlusconi, whose first government he staunchly opposed.

- La crisi del paese e il ruolo della gioventù. Comitato Centrale della FGCI 26-27 gennaio 1976. Relazione del Compagno Massimo D'Alema ("The Country's Crisis and the Role of Youth: Central Committee of the FGCI 26–27 January 1976. Report by Comrade Massimo D'Alema"). 1976.
- La formazione politica in un moderno partito riformatore ("Political Formation in a Modern Reform Party"). Edited with Franco Ottaviano. Rome: Togliatti Institute. 1988.
- Il partito nelle aree metropolitane ("The Party in the Metropolitan Areas"). Edited with Sandro Morelli. Rome: Togliatti Institute. 1988.
- Dialogo su Berlinguer ("Dialogue on Berlinguer"). With Paul Ginsborg. Florence: Giunti. 1994. ISBN 88-09-20545-6.
- Un paese normale. La sinistra e il futuro dell'Italia ("A Normal Country: The Left and Italy's Future"). With Gianni Cuperlo and Claudio Velardi. Milan: Mondadori. 1995. ISBN 88-04-40847-2.
- Progettare il futuro ("Shaping the Future"). Edited with Gianni Cuperlo and Claudio Velardi Milan: Bompiani. 1996. ISBN 88-452-2883-5.
- La sinistra nell'Italia che cambia ("The Left in the Changing Italy"). Milan: Feltrinelli. 1997. ISBN 88-07-47013-6.
- La grande occasione. L'Italia verso le riforme ("The Great Chance: Italy Towards Reforms"), Milan: Mondadori. 1997. ISBN 88-04-42161-4.
- Parole a vista ("Words on Sight"). Edited by Enrico Ghezzi. Milan: Bompiani. 1998. ISBN 88-452-3777-X.
- Kosovo. Gli italiani e la guerra ("Kosovo: Italians and War"). Interview with Federico Rampini. Milan: Mondadori, 1999, ISBN 88-04-47302-9.
- Oltre la paura ("Beyond Fear"). Milan: Mondadori. 2002. ISBN 88-04-51206-7.
- La politica ai tempi della globalizzazione ("Politics in the Time of Globalization"). San Cesario di Lecce: Manni. 2003. ISBN 88-8176-391-5.
- A Mosca, l'ultima volta. Enrico Berlinguer e il 1984 ("In Moscow, the Last Time: Enrico Berlinguer and 1984"). Rome: Donzelli. 2004. ISBN 88-7989-905-8.
- Il mondo nuovo. Riflessioni per il Partito democratico ("The New World: Reflections for the Democratic Party"). Rome: Italianieuropei. 2009. ISBN 978-88-89988-23-7.
- Controcorrente. Intervista sulla sinistra al tempo dell'antipolitica ("Countercurrent: Interview on the Left at the Time of Anti-Politics"). Edited by Giuseppe Caldarola. Rome: Laterza. 2013. ISBN 978-88-420-9612-2.
- Non solo euro. Democrazia, lavoro, uguaglianza. Una nuova frontiera per l'Europa ("Not Just Euros: Democracy, Labour, Equality. A New Frontier for Europe"). Soveria Mannelli: Rubbettino. 2014. ISBN 978-88-498-4104-6.

== Bibliography ==
- Baccetti, Carlo (1997). Il PDS. Verso un nuovo modello di partito? (in Italian). Bologna: Il Mulino. ISBN 978-8-8150-5715-0.
- Fasanella, Giovanni (1999). D'Alema (in Italian). Milan: Dalai Editore. ISBN 978-8-8808-9720-0.
- Rapisarda, Alberto (1996). Massimo D'Alema (in Italian). Rome: Viviani. ISBN 978-8-8799-3064-2.

Media offices
Preceded by Gerardo Chiaromonte	Director of L'Unità; 1988–1990	Succeeded by Renzo Foa
Party political offices
Preceded by Achille Occhetto	Secretary of the Democratic Party of the Left; 1994–1998	Party abolished
New political party	Secretary of the Democrats of the Left; 1998	Succeeded by Walter Veltroni
Preceded by Giglia Tedesco Tatò	President of the Democrats of the Left; 1998–2007	Party abolished
Political offices
Preceded by Romano Prodi	Prime Minister of Italy; 1998–2000	Succeeded by Giuliano Amato
Preceded by Giulio Tremonti	Deputy Prime Minister of Italy; 2006–2008; Served alongside: Francesco Rutelli	Vacant Title next held by Angelino Alfano
Preceded by Gianfranco Fini	Minister of Foreign Affairs; 2006–2008	Succeeded by Franco Frattini
