= List of Democrats of the Left politicians =

A list of notable politicians of the Democrats of the Left party of Italy:

== A ==
- Marisa Abbondanzieri
- Nicola Adamo
- Mauro Agostini
- Gavino Angius
- Aldo Aniasi
- Pino Arlacchi
- Corrado Augias
- Giuseppe Ayala

== B ==
- Franco Bassanini
- Antonio Bassolino
- Giovanni Battaglia
- Giorgio Benvenuto
- Giovanni Berlinguer
- Luigi Berlinguer
- Pier Luigi Bersani
- Mercedes Bresso
- Claudio Burlando

== C ==
- Pierre Carniti
- Patrizia Casagrande Esposto
- Luca Ceriscioli
- Sergio Chiamparino
- Massimo Cialente
- Sergio Cofferati
- Paola Concia
- Gianni Cuperlo

== D ==
- Massimo D'Alema
- Vito D'Ambrosio
- Cesare Damiano
- Leonardo Domenici

== E ==
- Vasco Errani

== F ==
- Italo Falcomatà
- Piero Fassino
- Claudio Fava
- Massimo Federici
- Emanuele Fiano
- Anna Finocchiaro

== G ==
- Giuseppe Giulietti
- Donata Gottardi
- Franco Grillini
- Lilli Gruber

== I ==
- Nilde Iotti

== K ==
- Giovanni Kessler

== L ==
- Vincenzo Lavarra
- Carlo Leoni
- Maria Rita Lorenzetti
- Giuseppe Lumia

== M ==
- Luigi Manconi
- Pietro Marcenaro
- Catiuscia Marini
- Ignazio Marino
- Giovanna Melandri
- Maurizio Migliavacca
- Marco Minniti
- Fabio Mussi

== N ==
- Pasqualina Napoletano
- Giorgio Napolitano

== O ==
- Achille Occhetto
- Mario Oliverio
- Rosario Olivo
- Andrea Orlando

== P ==
- Pier Antonio Panzeri
- Giovanni Pellegrino
- Giuseppe Pericu
- Claudio Petruccioli
- Roberta Pinotti
- Gianni Pittella
- Barbara Pollastrini

== R ==
- Piero Rebaudengo
- Stefano Rodotà

== S ==
- Guido Sacconi
- Cataldo Salerno
- Cesare Salvi
- Michele Santoro
- Marina Sereni
- Valdo Spini

== T ==
- Livia Turco

== V ==
- Gianni Vattimo
- Walter Veltroni
- Ugo Vetere
- Marta Vincenzi
- Luciano Violante
- Demetrio Volcic

== Z ==
- Mauro Zani
- Flavio Zanonato
