= Democracy and Socialism =

Political association in Italy

Democracy and Socialism (Democrazia e Socialismo) was a social-democratic political association in Italy. During the years it was a faction within the Democrats of the Left, the Socialist Party and finally the Democratic Party. Its leader was Gavino Angius.

== History ==
Originally named Socialists and Europeans (Socialisti ed Europei), the group was formed in 2006 as a faction within the Democrats of the Left (DS) by Gavino Angius and Giuseppe Caldarola in opposition to the creation of the Democratic Party (PD), which they believed would have been a rejection of the principles of social democracy and democratic socialism. Angius and his group wanted to remain members of the Party of European Socialists, as they had been since its foundation in 1992.

After the DS decided to merge into the PD in April 2007, some members (Mauro Zani, Massimo Brutti, Sergio Gentili, Giuseppe Caldarola and others) joined it, while Gavino Angius, Alberto Nigra, Franco Grillini and others (comprising two senators and two deputies) formed, along with other splinter groups of the DS, the Democratic Left (SD).

Soon Angius and his followers felt that the new party, led by Fabio Mussi, was moving too far to the left toward a close alliance with the Communist Refoundation Party, the Party of Italian Communists and the Federation of the Greens instead of forming an alliance with the much more moderate Italian Democratic Socialists.

In September 2007 the group around Angius finally broke apart from SD and joined the Italian Democratic Socialists, the New Italian Socialist Party of Mauro Del Bue and Gianni De Michelis, The Italian Socialists, the Association for the Rose in the Fist, Socialism is Freedom, and other groups and associations to form the Socialist Party (PS). Since then, it took the current name and was joined by Valdo Spini, another SD dissident. In 2007–2008 the group had two senators (Gavino Angius and Accursio Montalbano) and three deputies (Valdo Spini, Franco Grillini and Fabio Baratella).

After the huge defeat of the PS in the 2008 general election, the group around Angius supported the candidacy for party secretary of Riccardo Nencini, who won. In September 2008, Angius declared that "the Socialist constituent assembly has failed" and that the party should take part with the Democratic Party and possibly into it to the construction of a "new reformist centre-left", in line with what Nencini himself is proposing. However, in October 2008 Angius and his group abandoned the PS in order to join the Democratic Party, proposing that the whole party should follow him. Angius was joined also by Cinzia Dato, a former Liberal from Democracy is Freedom – The Daisy (DL), while Spini decided not to leave the PS.

In the 2009 Democratic Party leadership election the faction supported Pier Luigi Bersani.

== Leadership ==
- Coordinator: Giuseppe Caldarola (2006–2007), Alberto Nigra (since 2007)
