= Democrats, Laicists, Socialists =

Political faction in Italy

Democrats, Laicists, Socialists (Democratici, Laici, Socialisti, DLS) was a social-democratic faction within the Democratic Party, a political party in Italy.

It was founded in April 2007 by those Democrats of the Left who supported the motion of Gavino Angius at the party last congress, but decided not to follow their leader in the Democratic Left and to participate to the foundation of the Democratic Party instead.

Leading members of the faction included Massimo Brutti, Sergio Gentili and Mauro Zani.

During the 2007 leadership election DLS took part of the list named To the Left, along with Say Left and other groups. On 5 July 2005 it merged in into the faction, which became a united social-democratic and democratic-socialist faction within the Democratic Party.
