= Left for the Country =

Left for the Country (Sinistra per il Paese) was a democratic-socialist faction within the Democratic Party (PD), a political party in Italy.

It was founded by splinters of the Democratic Left (all former members of the left wing of the late Democrats of the Left) with strong connections with the Italian General Confederation of Labour and some former members of the Party of Italian Communists in February 2008, shortly before the general election. Its leaders included Famiano Crucianelli, Olga D'Antona, Paolo Nerozzi, Massimo Cialente and Gianfranco Pagliarulo.

On 5 July 2008 the group merged into To the Left, which became a united social-democratic and democratic-socialist faction within the Democratic Party.
