= Deaths in September 1982 =

The following is a list of notable deaths in September 1982.

Entries for each day are listed alphabetically by surname. A typical entry lists information in the following sequence:

- Name, age, country of citizenship at birth, subsequent country of citizenship (if applicable), reason for notability, cause of death (if known), and reference.

== September 1982 ==
=== 1 ===
- Isabel Cristina, 20, Brazilian Catholic laywoman, member of a youth group affiliated to the Vincentians,stabbed to death by a would-be rapist, due to resisting his attack and attempting to fight back
- Lady Iris Mountbatten, 62, English actress and model, hostess for the children's television series Versatile Varieties,brain tumor

=== 2 ===
- Jay Novello, 78, American character actor, he was a regular on the sitcom McHale's Navy, where he portrayed the con artist Mayor Mario Lugatto of Volta Fiore, Italy
- Ada Voytsik, 77, Soviet actress

=== 3 ===
- Carlo Alberto dalla Chiesa, 61, Italian Carabinieri general, he led an anti-terrorism campaign during the Years of Lead, shot with an AK-47 assault rifle during the Via Carini massacre
- Frederic Dannay, 76, American writer of detective fiction, one of two writers who used the pseudonym Ellery Queen, naming himself after the protagonist of his stories, he served as the founder and editor of the crime fiction magazine Ellery Queen's Mystery Magazine
- Emanuela Setti Carraro, 31, Italian nurse, originally a volunteer nurse of the Italian Red Cross, shot with an AK-47 assault rifle during the Via Carini massacre

=== 5 ===
- Sir Douglas Bader, 72, British flying ace during World War II, managing director of Shell Aircraft, and activist for disability rights, heart attack

=== 7 ===
- Ken Boyer, 51, American baseball player and manager, 1964 National League Most Valuable Player Award winner and World Series champion, lung cancer
- José Cabrero Arnal, 73, Spanish expatriate comics artist, he spend most of his career working in France, creator of Pif le chien, veteran of the Spanish Civil War, prisoner in the Mauthausen-Gusen concentration camp during World War II

=== 8 ===
- Sheikh Abdullah, 76, Indian politician, he was the founding leader and president of the political party All Jammu and Kashmir Muslim Conference, he served multiple terms as the Chief Minister of Jammu and Kashmir (1948–1953, 1975–1977, 1977–1982)

=== 9 ===
- Tee Tee Luce, 87, Burmese philanthropist, founder of the Home for Waifs and Strays, an orphanage and school for destitute boys in Rangoon

=== 10 ===
- Jane Ingham, 85, English botanist and scientific translator, she conducted groundbreaking research on the cell biology of plants

=== 12 ===
- Franz Grothe, 73, German composer, arranger, songwriter, conductor, and pianist

=== 13 ===
- Reed Crandall, 65, American illustrator and penciller of comic books and magazines, primarily known for his work on Blackhawk from 1942 until 1953, and for EC Comics during the 1950s, heart attack
- Philip Ober, 80, American actor and diplomat, he served as a consular agent to the American consul in Puerto Vallarta, Mexico,lung cancer

=== 14 ===
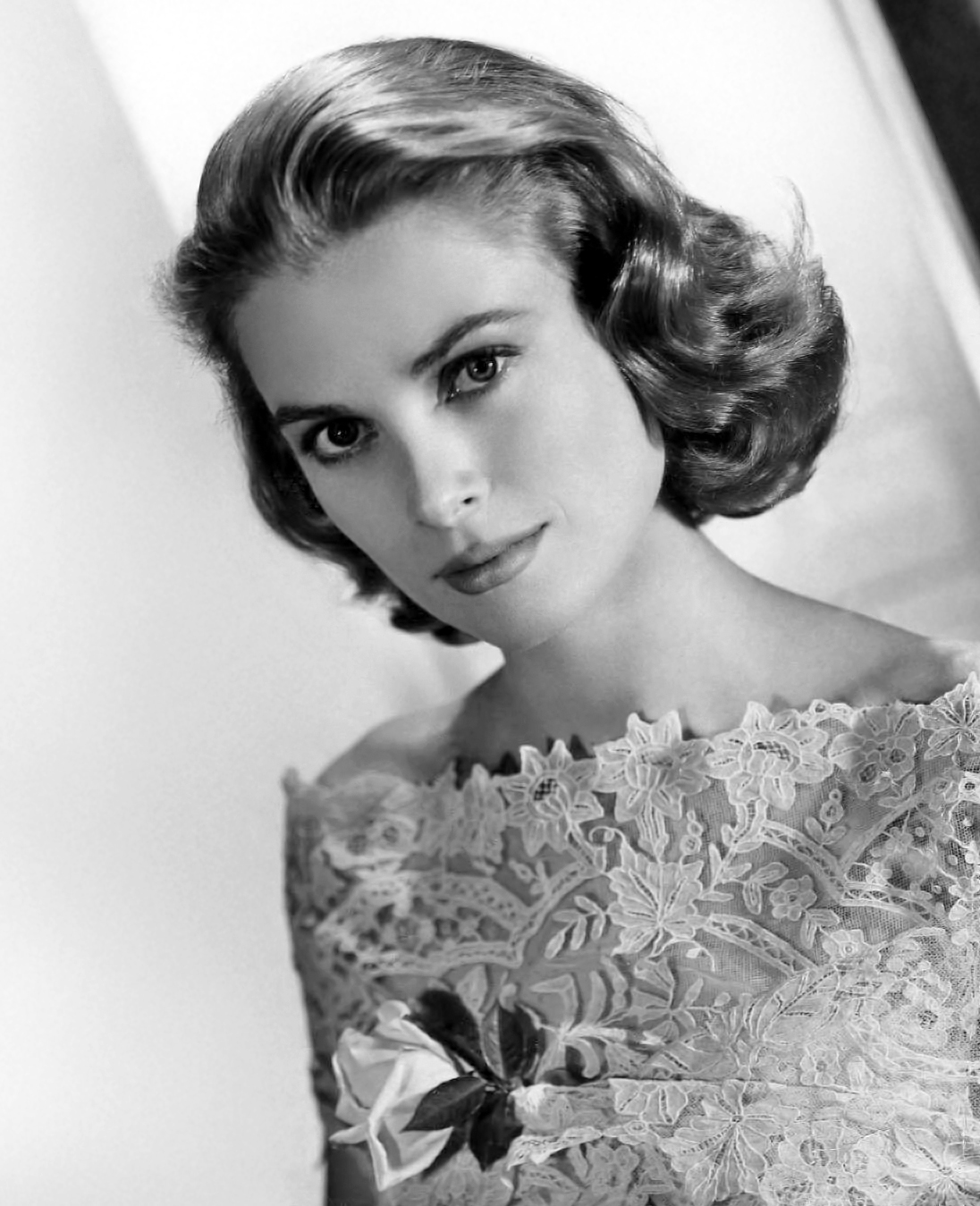
Grace Kelly

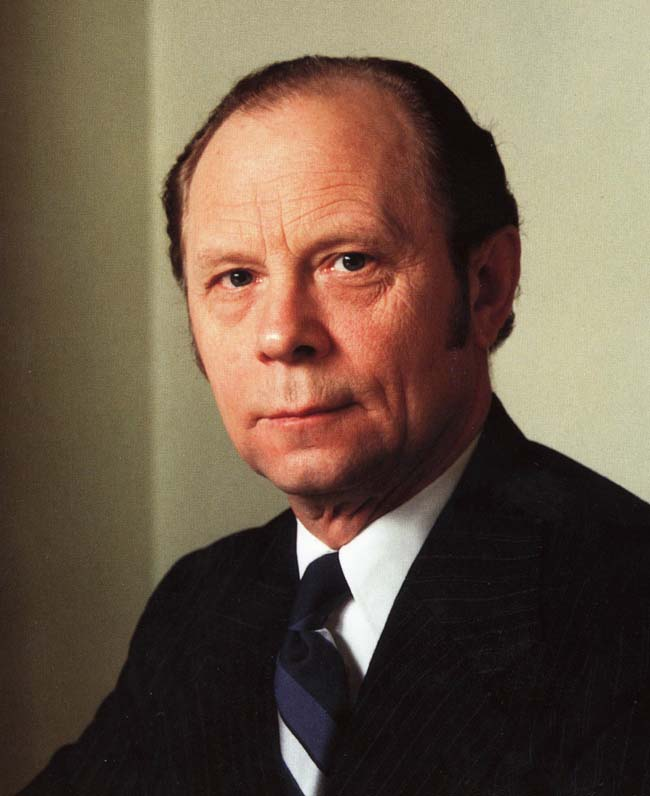
Kristján Eldjárn

- Kristján Eldjárn, 65, Icelandic politician and archaeologist, he served as the President of Iceland from 1968 until 1980, death due to post-surgery complications, following a heart surgery
- John Gardner, 49, American novelist, essayist, literary critic, and university professor, he is known primarily for his novel Grendel, a retelling of the Beowulf myth from the point of view of the monster Grendel , killed in a motorcycle accident
- Bachir Gemayel, 34, Lebanese militia commander, politician, and alleged war criminal, criticized for the use of force against civilians and for carrying out massacres which targeted both Muslims and Christians, founder and leader of the militia Lebanese Forces during the Lebanese Civil War, president-elect of Lebanon in 1982, he was the only available candidate in the election,assassinated with a bomb explosion before taking office
- Grace Kelly, 52, American actress, Princess consort of Monaco from 1956 until her death in 1982, President of the Red Cross of Monaco, taken off life support by decision of her husband, after she was declared brain dead. Kelly had suffered two cerebral hemorrhages since September 13
- Franco Solinas, 55, Italian writer and screenwriter, credited with the screenplays of several notable Zapata westerns

=== 15 ===
- Edith Kallir, 66, Austrian-born American photographer and educator
- Rolfe Sedan, 86, American character actor

=== 17 ===
- Gail Sheridan, 66, American actress and dancer, a member of the stock company of female dancers known as the Goldwyn Girls, contract player at the film studio Paramount Pictures,cancer

=== 21 ===
- Ivan Bagramyan, 84, Soviet Armenian military commander, he held the rank of a Marshal of the Soviet Union, commander of the 1st Baltic Front during World War II, he was the last surviving Soviet Marshal who had held a high command during World War II, death from an unspecified months-long illness

=== 23 ===
- Gene Day, 31, Canadian comics artist, primarily known for his work on Marvel Comics' Star Wars licensed series and Master of Kung Fu, coronary
- Weeratunge Edward Perera, 84, Malaysian Sinhalese educator, businessman and social entrepreneur, he oversaw the restoration of water, electrical supplies, medical services and governance to Telok Anson after its invasion by Japanese forces following the withdrawal of the British forces to Singapore, death from a heart attack shortly before his scheduled reception of a pacemaker
- Jimmy Wakely, 68, American actor, songwriter, country music vocalist, and music publisher, he was one of the last singing cowboys, heart failure

=== 24 ===
- Sarah Churchill, 67, English actress and dancer, known as Baroness Audley as the wife and widow of Thomas Touchet-Jesson, 23rd Baron Audley

=== 26 ===
- Valerie Bettis, 62, American modern dancer and choreographer

=== 27 ===
- W. Wallace Kelley, 80, American cinematographer and visual effects artist
- Juan Castañón de Mena, 79, Spanish general

=== 28 ===
- Mabel Albertson, 81, American actress, she portrayed the neurotic mother Phyllis Stephens in the sitcom Bewitched,Alzheimer's disease
- Larry Breeding, 36, American comic actor, killed in a traffic accident, when his car struck a center divider

=== 29 ===
- Letitia Chitty, 85, English engineer, she was the first female fellow of the Royal Aeronautical Society, she evaluated the structural strength of the massive bomber Tarrant Tabor, her World War II work included research into stresses in submarine hulls under shell attack, extensible cables and pulley blocks for barrage balloons, for the Director of Scientific Research of the Admiralty and the Ministry of Supply
- Monty Stratton, 70, American professional baseball pitcher in Major League Baseball (MLB), wearing a prosthetic leg following a hunting accident, he played in the minor leagues from 1946 until 1953,cancer

== Sources ==
- Arseculeratne, S. N. (1991), Sinhalese Immigrants in Malaysia and Singapore 1850 - 1990, History through Recollections, K. V. G. De Silva and Sons, Colombo, ISBN 955-9112-01-5
- Bader, Douglas (2004). Fight for the Sky: The Story of the Spitfire and Hurricane. Ipswich, UK: W.S. Cowell Ltd. ISBN 978-0-304-35674-4.
- Hoiberg, Dale H., ed. (2010). "Abdullah, Sheikh Muhammad". Encyclopædia Britannica. Vol. I: A-ak Bayes (15th ed.). Chicago, Illinois: Encyclopædia Britannica Inc. pp. 22–23. ISBN 978-1-59339-837-8.
- Leigh, Wendy (2007). True Grace: The Life and Times of an American Princess. New York: Thomas Dunne Books. ISBN 978-0-312-34236-4.
- Turner, John Frayn (1995). Douglas Bader: A Biography of the Legendary World War II Fighter Pilot. London: Airlife. ISBN 978-1-85310-546-3.
