= Say Left =

Say Left (Dì Sinistra) was a democratic-socialist faction within the Democratic Party, a political party in Italy. Its leader was Vincenzo Vita.

It was founded in April 2007 by those Democrats of the Left who supported the motion of Fabio Mussi at the party last congress, but decided not to follow their leader in the Democratic Left and to participate to the foundation of the Democratic Party instead.

During the election for the Constituent Assembly of the Democratic Party on 14 October 2007, Say Left took part to the list named To the Left, along with Democrats, Laicists, Socialists and other groups. On 5 July 2005 it merged into the faction, which became a united social-democratic and democratic-socialist faction within the Democratic Party.
