= Liberal PD =

- Leader: Enzo Bianco
- Other members: Franco Bassanini; Sandro Gozi
- Founded: 26 January 2008
- Merger of: Liberal Left; Liberal DS; Republican Left
- Ideology: Liberalism
- Political position: Centre to centre-left

Liberal PD (Italian: Liberal PD) is a social-liberal faction within the Democratic Party (PD), a political party in Italy. The aim of the group is to promote liberal ideas within the party and elect liberal candidates. The faction, through the Italian Liberal Group, is an observer member of the Liberal International.

Liberal PD was launched on 26 January 2008 by Enzo Bianco (former member of the Italian Republican Party, PRI and Democracy is Freedom – The Daisy, DL), Franco Bassanini (former member of the Italian Socialist Party, PSI and the Democrats of the Left, DS), Valerio Zanone (former leader of the Italian Liberal Party and member of DL) and Enrico Morando (leader of Liberal DS). Walter Veltroni, PD leader, attended the convention. More than 40 leading Democrats signed the "Liberal" Manifesto. Most former Republicans within the party, including Antonio Maccanico, Stefano Passigli, Giorgio Bogi (former leader of Republican Left), Giuseppe Ossorio (former leader of the Democratic Republicans), Adolfo Battaglia, Andrea Manzella and Massimo Livi Bacci, and most former Liberals, including Beatrice Rangoni Machiavelli (Patron of the Liberal International), Andrea Marcucci, former Democrats of the Left of Liberal DS and Liberal Left, joined the faction. Also several former Socialists, including Giuliano Amato, Linda Lanzillotta, Enrico Manca and Salvo Andò, and former Greens, including Paolo Gentiloni, Gianni Vernetti and Sandro Battisti, joined.

Most Liberal PD members were keen supporters of Walter Veltroni's leadership, while others were closer to Francesco Rutelli. In the 2009 leadership election the faction supported Dario Franceschini. After that, the faction has given strong support to Matteo Renzi, both in the 2013 and the 2017 leadership elections.

== Leadership ==
- President: Enzo Bianco (2008–present)
  - Vice President: Franco Bassanini (2008–2014), Ludina Barzini (2010–present), Sandro Gozi (2010–present), Andrea Marcucci (2010–present), Adriano Musi (2011–2014), Sandro Gozi (2014–present), Luigi De Sena (2014–2015)
  - Honorary President: Valerio Zanone (2008–2014)
- Secretary-General: Franco Minucci (2008–2014)
  - Deputy Secretary-General: Renato Lupoli (2010–present), Gianfranco Passalacqua (2014–present)
  - Territorial Coordinator: Sofia De Valois (2026–present)
