= Nando dalla Chiesa =

Italian politician and writer (born 1949)

Nando Dalla Chiesa
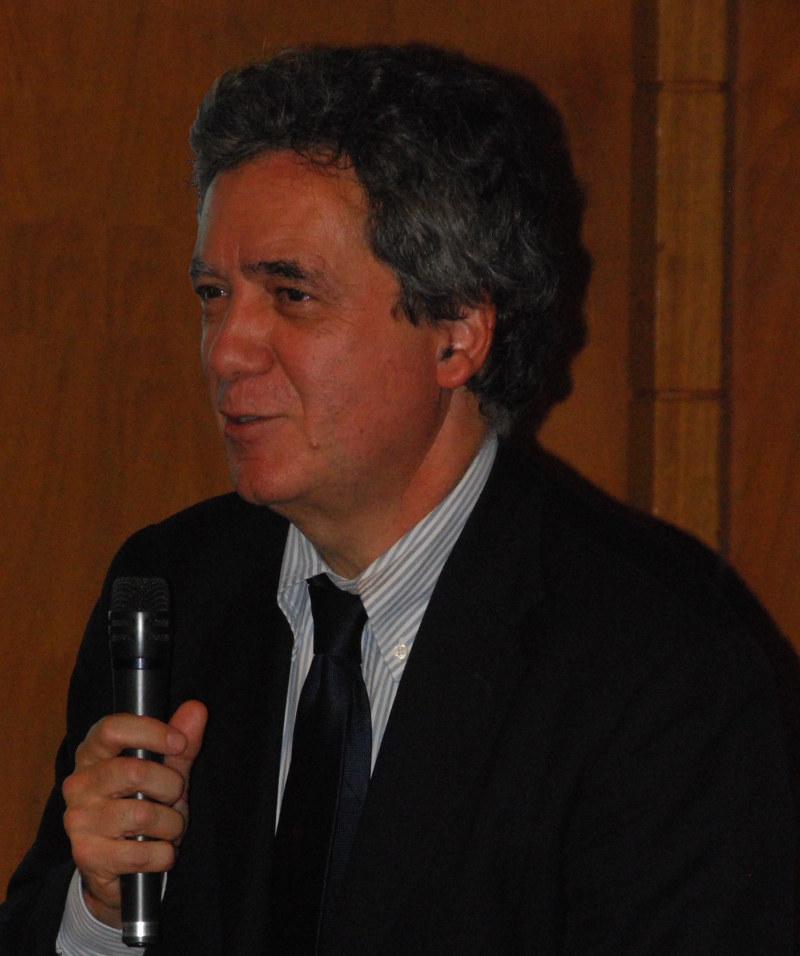

Member of the Senate of the Republic
- In office 29 May 2001 – 27 April 2006
- Constituency: Genoa

Member of the Chamber of Deputies
- In office 9 May 1996 – 29 May 2001
- Constituency: Paderno Dugnano
- In office 23 April 1992 – 14 April 1994
- Constituency: Milan

Personal details
- Born: Fernando Dalla Chiesa; 3 November 1949 (age 76) Florence, Italy
- Party: LR (1992–1994); ID (1994–2000); Dem (2000–2002); DL (2002–2007); PD (2007–2009)
- Parent(s): Carlo Alberto Dalla Chiesa; Emanuela Setti Carraro (step-mother)
- Relatives: Rita Dalla Chiesa (sister)
- Education: Bocconi University
- Occupation: Academic, politician, writer

Fernando Dalla Chiesa (born 3 November 1949) is an Italian academic and politician, honorary president of Libera, former deputy and senator.

== Biography ==
Dalla Chiesa is the son of General Carlo Alberto Dalla Chiesa, notable for campaigning against terrorism, and the brother of the TV presenter Rita Dalla Chiesa and the journalist and politician Simona Dalla Chiesa. His father was assassinated in 1982 together with his second wife, Emanuela Setti Carraro.

Dalla Chiesa graduated in economics at the Bocconi University in Milan and became a university professor of sociology of organized crime, business management and communication and sociology of the organization at the University of Milan. He is also honorary president of Luigi Ciotti's Libera association.

=== Political career ===
In 1992, Dalla Chiesa joined Leoluca Orlando's new-born left-wing party The Network, for which he was elected to the Chamber of Deputies at the 1992 general election.

In the 1993 local elections, Dalla Chiesa ran for the office of mayor of Milan, supported by his party, by the Democratic Party of the Left, the Communist Refoundation Party and the Federation of the Greens. He reached the runoff, but was defeated by the Northern League candidate, Marco Formentini.

Dalla Chiesa was not re-elected to the Chamber of Deputies in the 1994 general election and decided to leave The Network. He returned to the Chamber of Deputies in the 1996 general election, being elected as an independent in the Federation of the Greens with the support of The Olive Tree coalition.

When in 1998 the first D'Alema cabinet was sworn in, Dalla Chiesa refrained from voting for trust because the government was also supported by Francesco Cossiga with whom dalla Chiesa had a bad relationship, since he accused the former president of Italy of raising many malevolences against his father when he was prefect in Palermo.

In 2000, he became the coordinator in Lombardy of Arturo Parisi's The Democrats and, in the 2001 general election, he was elected to the Senate. In 2002, The Democrats and the Italian People's Party merged into The Daisy.

Dalla Chiesa did not run for a parliamentary seat again in the 2006 general election, but after the win of The Union he was appointed undersecretary for universities and scientific research in the second Prodi Cabinet. In 2007, Dalla Chiesa was a member of the national directorate of the Democratic Party.

=== Writing career ===
Dalla Chiesa has written several books and essays about politics and the fight against organized crime in Italy. Among his most known works is the 1992 book Il giudice ragazzino (The Boy Judge), a tribute essay dedicated to Rosario Livatino, a young Sicilian judge who had been murdered by the Mafia in 1990. In telling the experience and the tragic end of Livatino, dalla Chiesa reconstructs his vision of the connection between the Mafia, politics and institutions in Sicily and Italy in the late 1980s, indicating the murder of the judge as one of the highest triumphs of criminal powers.

The 1994 film Law of Courage is based on Dalla Chiesa's book.

== Electoral history ==
Election	House	Constituency	Party	Votes	Result
1992	Chamber of Deputies	Milan–Pavia	LR	36,260	Elected
1994	Chamber of Deputies	Milan 9	LR	33,844	Not elected
1996	Chamber of Deputies	Paderno Dugnano	FdV	34,717	Elected
2001	Senate of the Republic	Genoa–Bargagli	Dem	85,135	Elected

=== First-past-the-post elections ===
1994 general election (C): Milan 9
Candidate	Coalition or Party	Votes	%
Roberto Ronchi	Pole of Freedoms	43,195	47.7
Nando Dalla Chiesa	Alliance of Progressives	33,844	37.4
Fabio Carlo Alexis De Fina	National Alliance	7,042	7.9
Enzo Adriano Gobbi	Pact for Italy	6,421	7.1
Total		90,502	100.0

1996 general election (C): Paderno Dugnano
Candidate	Coalition or Party	Votes	%
Nando Dalla Chiesa	The Olive Tree	34,717	42.3
Carlo Usiglio	Pole of Freedoms	31,831	38.8
Margherita Muzzioli	Lega Nord	15,488	18.9
Total		82,036	100.0

2001 general election (S): Liguria — Genoa–Bargagli
Candidate	Coalition or Party	Votes	%
Nando Dalla Chiesa	The Olive Tree	85,135	49.5
Gian Nicola Amoretti	House of Freedoms	62,871	36.5
Franco Zunino	Communist Refoundation Party	11,136	6.5
Giovanna Molisso	Italy of Values	5,689	3.3
Bruno Fedi	Bonino List–Pannella List	4,243	2.5
Others		2,962	1.7
Total		172,036	100.0
