= Socialism 2000 =

Socialism 2000 (Italian: Socialismo 2000) was a democratic socialist political association in Italy led by Cesare Salvi.

== History ==
The group was launched in August 2000 as a left-wing faction within the Democrats of the Left (DS). Socialism 2000 was since then part of the internal left of the party. In 2007 Salvi and his followers chose to leave the DS, as they had refused to merge into the new Democratic Party (PD), and took part to the foundation of Democratic Left (SD).

Soon after the 2008 general election Socialism 2000 regained its autonomy and chose to join the Anticapitalist and Communist List composed of the Communist Refoundation Party (PRC), the Party of Italian Communists (PdCI) and the United Consumers (CU) for the 2009 European Parliament election. The group was represented in the lists by four candidates: former Senator Massimo Villone, Maria Rosaria Marella, Daniele Valletta and Sara Sbizzera. In September 2012, Socialism 2000 merged with Labour–Solidarity to form the Labour Party.
