= Antonio Carmine Centi =

Italian politician (1944–2024)

Mayor of L'Aquila
- In office 26 June 1994 – 8 June 1998
- Preceded by: Giuseppe Placidi
- Succeeded by: Biagio Tempesta

Member of the Regional Council of Abruzzo
- In office 1990–1994

Personal details
- Born: 13 June 1944 Barisciano, Italy
- Died: 20 August 2024 (aged 80) Tortoreto, Italy
- Party: Democrats of the Left (1998–?)
- Other political affiliations: Democratic Party of the Left (1991–1998); Italian Communist Party (prior to 1991)

Antonio Carmine Centi (13 June 1944 – 20 August 2024) was an Italian politician. In 1994, Centi became the first directly elected Mayor of L'Aquila. He held that office for one term from 1994 until 1998. Prior to becoming mayor, Centi also served in the fifth legislature of the Regional Council of Abruzzo from 1990 to 1994.

Centi later served as the president of the National Association of Italian Municipalities' Abruzzo chapter. He then became president of the Abruzzo Symphony Orchestra from 2010 until his death in 2024.

== Biography ==
Centi was born in the commune of Barisciano. Centi was elected mayor of L'Aquila in the runoff election on 26 June 1994 with the support of a progressive, left-wing coalition. He defeated his runoff opponent, Pole Gianfranco Volpe, with 57.0% of the vote. He became the city's first mayor elected through a direct mayoral election.

He sought re-election to second term in 1998, but lost to Biagio Tempesta of Forza Italia in the runoff on 7 June 1998. Centi received just 43.6% of the votes.

Centi died on 20 August 2024, at the age of 80.
