= To the Left =

To the Left (A Sinistra) was a social-democratic and democratic-socialist faction within the Democratic Party, a centre-left political party in Italy.

It was founded as an electoral list for the election for the Constituent Assembly of the Democratic Party of 14 October 2007, comprising Livia Turco, Furio Colombo, Peppino Caldarola, the Democrats, Laicists, Socialists (Massimo Brutti, Sergio Gentili, Mauro Zani), Say Left (Vincenzo Vita, Giuseppe Giulietti, Augusto Battaglia) and some Liberal Socialists (Annamaria Carli, Giorgio Ruffolo).

The list, which was present in only 15 constituencies out of 29, scored 7.7% in the election, electing more than 300 delegates to the Assembly. Its strongholds are the cities and especially Turin (32.7%) and Rome (27.1%).

On 5 July 2008, the three groups cited before plus Left for the Country, a group of splinters from Democratic Left and the Party of Italian Communists, merged into the faction, which became a united social-democratic and democratic-socialist faction within the Democratic Party.

The members of To the Left included both supporters of Walter Veltroni (Veltroniani), notably Vincenzo Vita, and supporters of Massimo D'Alema (Dalemiani), including Livia Turco, who is also an active member of Reformists and Democrats.
