= Mayor of L'Aquila =

- Sindaco dell'Aquila

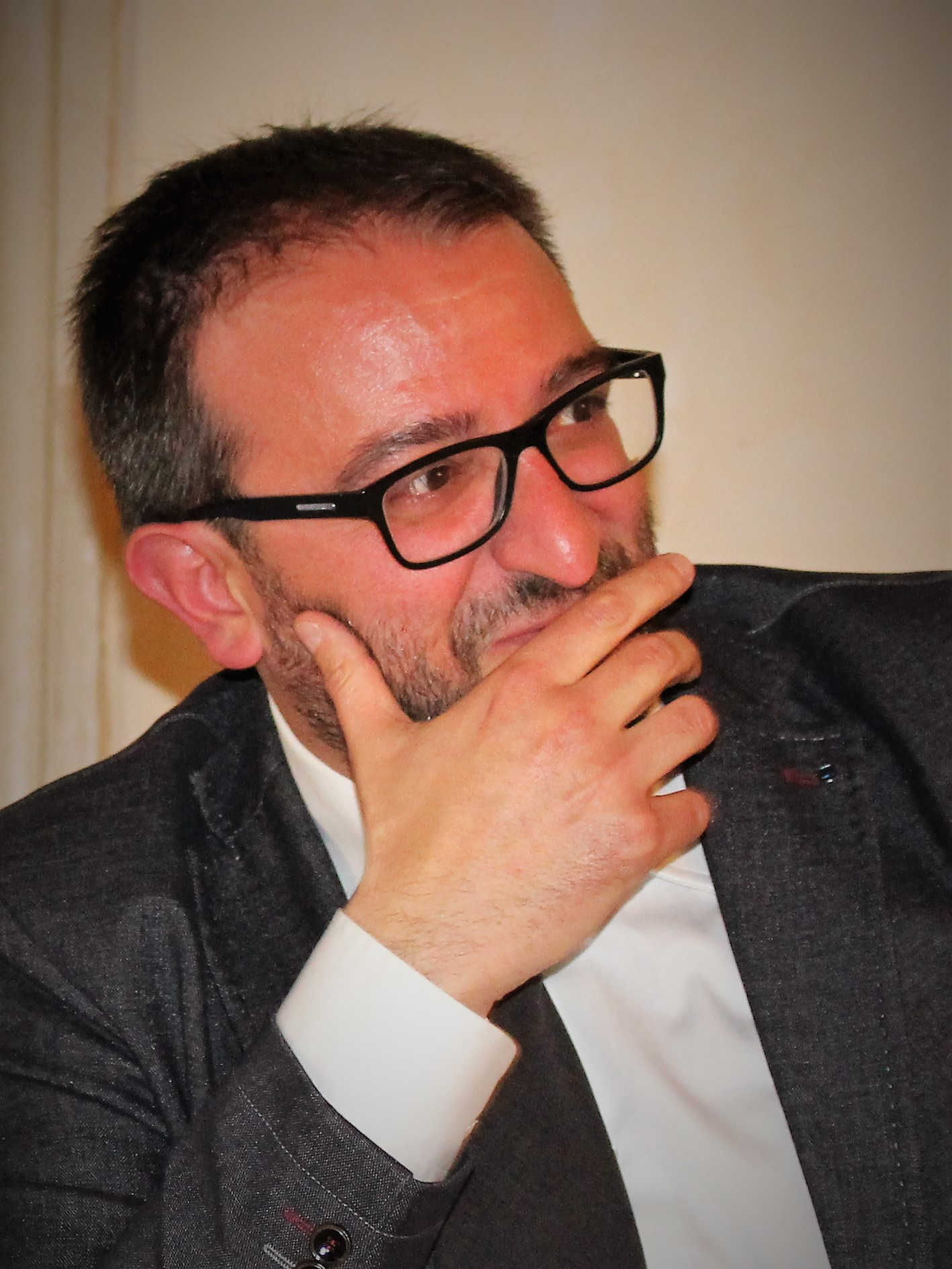
- Incumbent; Pierluigi Biondi (FdI) since 28 June 2017
- Appointer: Popular election
- Term length: 5 years, renewable once
- Formation: 1861
- Website: Official website

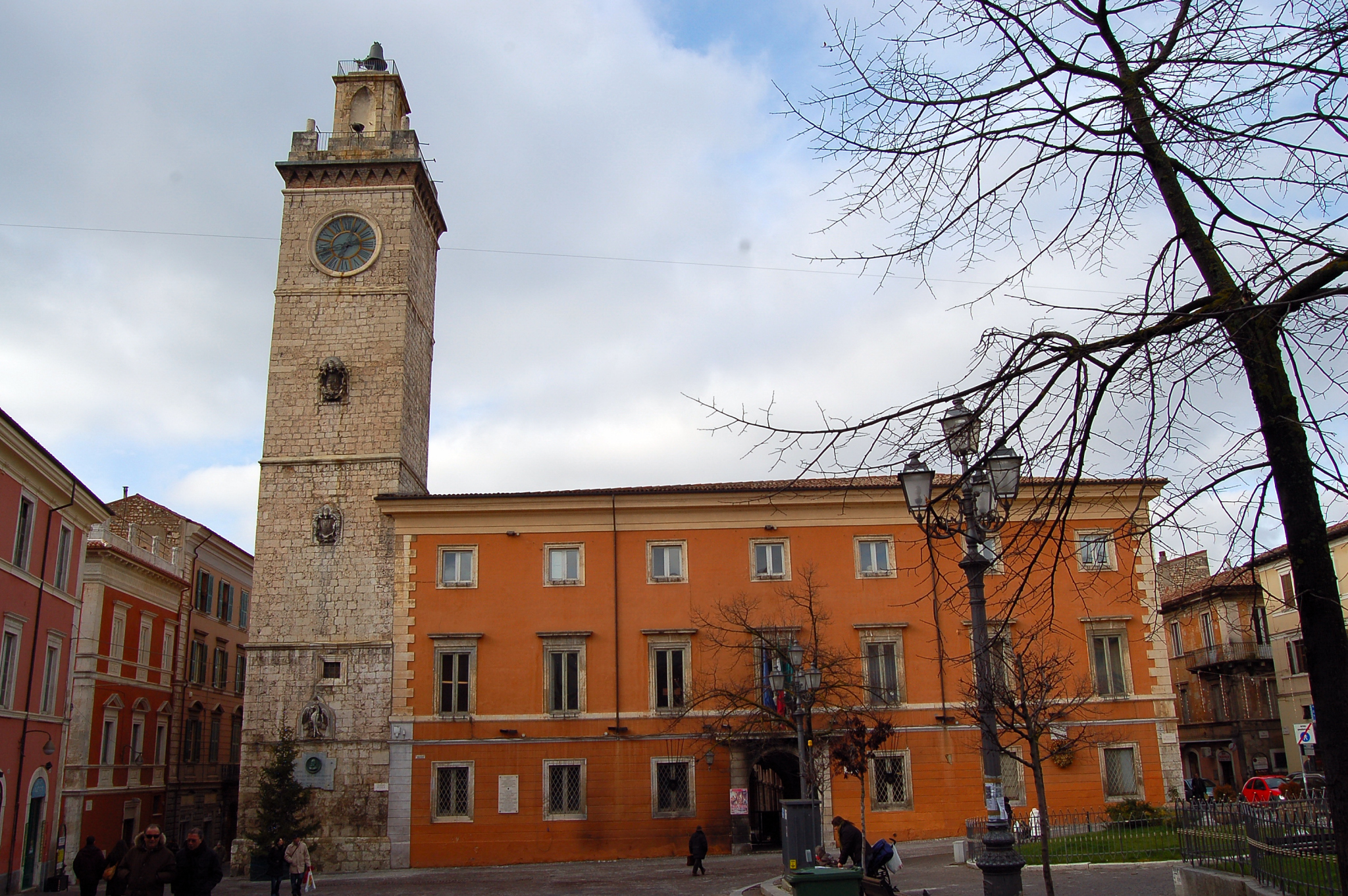
Palazzo Margherita is the seat of the Mayor of L'Aquila.

The mayor of L'Aquila is an elected politician who, along with the L'Aquila City Council, is accountable for the strategic government of L'Aquila in Abruzzo, Italy, capital city of the region.

The current mayor is Pierluigi Biondi from the far-right party Brothers of Italy, who took office on 28 June 2017.

== Overview ==
According to the Italian Constitution, the mayor of L'Aquila is member of the city council.

The mayor is elected by the population of L'Aquila, who also elects the members of the city council, controlling the mayor's policy guidelines and is able to enforce his resignation by a motion of no confidence. The mayor is entitled to appoint and release the members of his government.

Since 1994 the mayor is elected directly by L'Aquila's electorate: in all mayoral elections in Italy in cities with a population higher than 15,000 the voters express a direct choice for the mayor or an indirect choice voting for the party of the candidate's coalition. If no candidate receives at least 50% of votes, the top two candidates go to a second round after two weeks. The election of the City Council is based on a direct choice for the candidate with a preference vote: the candidate with the majority of the preferences is elected. The number of the seats for each party is determined proportionally.

== 1861–1946 ==
Government-Appointed Mayors(1861-1889)
Mayor	Term start	Term end	Party
Fabio Cannella	17 March 1861	18 November 1865	Historical Left
Antonio Chiarizia	18 November 1865	c. 1873	Historical Left
Michael Iacobucci	c. 1874	c. 1885	Historical Left
Antonio Ciolina	c. 1885	c. 1889	Historical Left

== Italian Republic (since 1946) ==
=== City Council election (1946–1994) ===
Until 1994, the Mayor of L'Aquila was elected by the City Council.

	Mayor	Term start	Term end	Party
1	Carlo Chiarizia	1 June 1946	14 May 1948	PCI
2	Cesare Di Palma	14 May 1948	25 May 1950	DC
3	Antonio Rainaldi	25 May 1950	12 July 1951	PRI
4	Angelo Colagrande	12 July 1951	14 July 1956	PLI
5	Federico Trecco	14 July 1956	25 February 1961	DC
6	Amedeo Cervelli	25 February 1961	27 February 1961	DC
7	Felice Natellis	27 February 1961	18 March 1961	DC
8	Francesco Gaudieri	18 March 1961	12 March 1965	DC
9	Umberto Albano	12 March 1965	7 October 1966	DC
10	Tullio De Rubeis	7 October 1966	14 January 1970	DC
11	Giovanni De Santis	14 January 1970	25 April 1970	DC
(10)	Tullio De Rubeis	21 October 1970	9 September 1975	DC
12	Ubaldo Lopardi	9 September 1975	27 August 1980	PSDI
(10)	Tullio De Rubeis	27 August 1980	12 October 1985	DC
13	Romeo Ricciuti	12 October 1985	24 October 1985	DC
14	Enzo Lombardi	24 October 1985	13 January 1992	DC
15	Maria Luisa Baldoni	13 January 1992	28 February 1993	DC
16	Giuseppe Placidi	28 February 1993	25 October 1993	DC
–	Special Prefectural Commissioner tenure (25 October 1993 – 26 June 1994)			

=== Direct election (since 1994) ===
Since 1994, under provisions of new local administration law, the Mayor of L'Aquila is chosen by direct election, originally every four, then every five years.

	Mayor	Term start	Term end	Party	Coalition	Election
17	Antonio Carmine Centi	26 June 1994	8 June 1998	PDS	PDS • LR	1994
18	Biagio Tempesta	8 June 1998	28 May 2002	FI	FI • AN • CCD • CDU	1998
18	Biagio Tempesta	28 May 2002	29 May 2007	FI	FI • AN • UDC	2002
19	Massimo Cialente	29 May 2007	22 May 2012	PD	PD • UDEUR • PSI • IdV • PRC	2007
19	Massimo Cialente	22 May 2012	28 June 2017	PD	PD • ApI • PSI • SEL • FdS	2012
20	Pierluigi Biondi	28 June 2017	20 June 2022	FdI	FI • FdI • UDC • Lega	2017
20	Pierluigi Biondi	20 June 2022	incumbent	FdI	FI • FdI • UDC • Lega	2022

== See also ==
- Timeline of L'Aquila
