= Democratic Left (Italy) =

Defunct Italian political party

Democratic Left Sinistra Democratica
- Coordinator: Claudio Fava
- President: Fabio Mussi
- Founded: 5 May 2007; 17 years ago
- Dissolved: 22–24 October 2010; 14 years ago
- Split from: Democrats of the Left
- Merged into: Left Ecology Freedom
- Headquarters: Via Palermo, 12; 00184 Rome
- Newspaper: Aprile per la Sinistra
- Membership: unknown
- Ideology: Democratic socialism Green politics
- Political position: Left-wing
- National affiliation: Rainbow Left (2008); Left Ecology Freedom (2009-10)
- European Parliament group: Party of European Socialists (2007–09)

Website
- www.sinistra-democratica.it

Democratic Left (Italian: Sinistra Democratica, SD), whose complete name was Democratic Left. For European Socialism (Sinistra Democratica. Per il Socialismo Europeo), was a democratic-socialist political party in Italy.

SD was founded on 5 May 2007 by splinters of the Democrats of the Left (DS) led by Fabio Mussi and Gavino Angius, who opposed the merger of the DS with Democracy is Freedom – The Daisy to form the Democratic Party. According to its leading members at its foundation, SD was to be not a party but a movement, with the goal to unite the entire Italian left from Communist Refoundation Party to the Italian Democratic Socialists.

On 22–24 October 2010, SD was merged into Left Ecology Freedom.

== History ==
=== Foundation ===
In April 2007 the Democrats of the Left (DL) held in Florence their last congress in order to ratify the move towards the foundation of the Democratic Party, along with the centrists of Democracy is Freedom – The Daisy. In opposition to Piero Fassino's majority resolution, two resolutions were tabled by supporters of the factions led by Fabio Mussi and Gavino Angius (who formed Socialists and Europeans together with Mauro Zani): the first opposed in any form the foundation of the PD, whilst the second was favourable only in the event that the new party was to join the Party of European Socialists and thus represented a more "wait and see" attitude. These resolutions managed to garner around 25% of the vote.

Following the congress, a large majority of Mussi's followers, with a few notable exceptions such as Vincenzo Vita, left the DS. This was consistent with their declared position prior to the Florence congress. In contrast, Angius' sudden departure from DS after the congress was somewhat surprising and arguably inconsistent with the position adopted by the supporters of the Angius-Zani resolution prior to and during the congress itself. Consequently, rather than follow Angius out of the party some of the most significant supporters of the motion, including Zani, Massimo Brutti and Sergio Gentili opted to stay inside the DS. On 16 May 2007 the new party's parliamentary groups had 22 deputies and 12 senators.

=== Early splits ===
Following its foundation, SD was divided between supporters of Mussi, who wanted strong relations with the so-called "far-left parties" (Federation of the Greens, Party of Italian Communists and Communist Refoundation Party), and those around Angius, who were keener on an alliance with the more centrist Italian Democratic Socialists. In September Democracy and Socialism, led by Angius and Valdo Spini, joined the "Socialist Constituent Assembly" and committed themselves to the foundation of a social-democratic party in the tradition of the historical Italian Socialist Party. Finally, in October 2007, Angius and his group left SD to found the Socialist Party.

The SD party suffered another split in February 2008 when Famiano Crucianelli, Olga D'Antona, Paolo Nerozzi, Massimo Cialente and Gianfranco Pagliarulo (a former member of the Party of Italian Communists) abandoned SD in order to join the Democratic Party, through an association named Left for the Country.

=== Out of Parliament ===
In the 2008 general election The Left – The Rainbow, of which the Democratic Left was a part along with the Communist Refoundation Party (PRC), the Party of Italian Communists (PdCI) and the Federation of the Greens, gained 3.1% of the vote and failed to win any seats in the Italian Parliament.

After the election, Oliviero Diliberto, leader of PdCI, who considered the experience of a "united left" ended, proposed a "communist constituent assembly" and the PRC elected Paolo Ferrero, from the internal left-wing, as party secretary. Despite these events, Democratic Left proposed a "left-wing constituent assembly" as a bridge between the "European socialism" and "the alternative left". In the run up to the 2009 European Parliament election SD planned to form a joint list with the Movement for the Left, the Federation of the Greens and Unite the Left in a sort of re-edition of The Left – The Rainbow. The list, with the additional participation of the Socialist Party, was named Left and Freedom and was launched on 16 March 2009. The list received just 3.1% of the national vote and failed to return any MEPs. The list was eventually renamed Left Ecology Freedom, and was founded as a united political party on 22–24 October 2010.

== Leadership ==
- Political Coordinator: Fabio Mussi (2007–2008), Claudio Fava (2008–2010)
  - Executive Coordinator: Marco Fumagalli (2007–2010)
- President of the National Council: Fabio Mussi (2008–2010)
- President of the National Bureau: Pasqualina Napoletano (2008–2010)
- Party Leader in the Chamber of Deputies: Titti Di Salvo (2007–2008)
- Party Leader in the Senate: Cesare Salvi (2007–2008)
- Party Leader in the European Parliament: Claudio Fava (2007–2010)
