= Movement for the Labour Party =

Movement for the Labour Party Movimento per il Partito del Lavoro
- Leader: Cesare Salvi and Giampaolo Patta
- Founded: September 2012
- Merger of: Socialism 2000, Labour–Solidarity
- Newspaper: Lavoro & politica
- Ideology: Socialism
- Political position: Left-wing
- National affiliation: Federation of the Left

Website
- www.partito-lavoro.it

The Movement for the Labour Party (Italian: Movimento per il Partito del Lavoro) was a socialist and trade union-inspired political party in Italy.

It was formed in September 2012 by the merger of Socialism 2000 (leader: Cesare Salvi) and Labour–Solidarity (leader: Gian Paolo Patta), both constituent members of the Federation of the Left (FdS). The party aimed at forming a broad labour party including communists, socialists and trade unionists.
