= One Hundred Days in Palermo =

1984 Italian film

- Directed by: Giuseppe Ferrara
- Written by: Giuseppe Tornatore
- Produced by: Eric Geiger; Alain Pancrazi
- Starring: Lino Ventura; Giuliana De Sio; Lino Troisi; Stefano Satta Flores; Arnoldo Foà; Adalberto Maria Merli
- Music by: Vittorio Gelmetti
- Release date: 6 April 1984
- Running time: 107 minutes
- Country: Italy
- Languages: Italian; French

One Hundred Days in Palermo (Italian: Cento giorni a Palermo) is a 1984 non-fiction film directed by Giuseppe Ferrara and written by Giuseppe Tornatore. The film dramatizes the last hundred days in the life of Carlo Alberto Dalla Chiesa, the Carabinieri General and prefect of Palermo who was murdered along with his wife and bodyguard for his anti-mafia activities.

== Plot ==
Palermo, April 1982. The citizens of the Sicilian capital await with confidence and hope the arrival of the new prefect, appointed by the Minister of the Interior Virginio Rognoni: he is not a director of the state apparatus, but the general of the Carabinieri Carlo Alberto Dalla Chiesa, known throughout the country for his decisive contribution in the past to the fight against Sicilian banditry and subsequently to the red subversion. Accompanying the General to Palermo is his young second wife Emanuela Setti Carraro, while helping Dalla Chiesa in the initial investigations is Captain Fontana. Palermo is tired and scared by the latest brutal murders of high-profile figures: Boris Giuliano, Piersanti Mattarella, Cesare Terranova, Gaetano Costa, and Pio La Torre, the latter murdered on the very day Dalla Chiesa took office as Prefect. The people of Palermo see in the General their last hope: a hope that, as a famous writing on a wall would later read, would die one hundred days later.

== Cast ==
- Lino Ventura as General Carlo Alberto Dalla Chiesa
- Giuliana De Sio as Emanuela Setti Carraro
- Lino Troisi as Pio La Torre
- Stefano Satta Flores as Captain Fontana
- Arnoldo Foà as Virginio Rognoni
- Andrea Aureli
- Accursio Di Leo
- Adalberto Maria Merli
