= Rita dalla Chiesa =

Italian television presenter and politician (born 1947)

Rita Dalla Chiesa
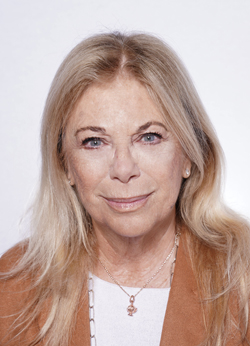

Member of the Chamber of Deputies
- Incumbent
- Assumed office 13 October 2022
- Constituency: Molfetta

Personal details
- Born: 31 August 1947 (age 78) Casoria, Italy
- Party: Forza Italia
- Height: 1.65 m (5 ft 5 in)
- Spouse(s): Roberto Cirese Fabrizio Frizzi (m. 1992; div. 2002)
- Children: 1
- Parent(s): Carlo Alberto Dalla Chiesa; Emanuela Setti Carraro (step-mother)
- Relatives: Nando Dalla Chiesa (brother)
- Occupation: Television presenter, politician
- Website: www.ritadallachiesa.it

Rita Dalla Chiesa (born 31 August 1947) is an Italian television presenter and politician.

== Early life and family ==
Dalla Chiesa was born on 31 August 1947 in Casoria. Her father was general Carlo Alberto Dalla Chiesa, assassinated in 1982 together with his second wife, Emanuela Setti Carraro.

== Career ==
Dalla Chiesa's career began in 1983, when she presented the show Vediamoci sul due on Rai 2, and later Pane e marmellata with Fabrizio Frizzi. She moved to Fininvest where in 1988 she presented Forum, a daily program about court cases broadcasting on Canale 5. In the 1990s, she presented the prime time show 44 Gatti.

Dalla Chiesa stayed on 44 Gatti until 1997, when it was moved to Rete 4. She switched to a new show on Canale 5, Signore Mie, and then presented Il Trucco c'è, a Saturday afternoon talk show for Retequattro. After a return to RAI in 2002/2003, she presented the morning show I Fatti Vostri. In September 2003, she returned to Forum, which in 2008 moved to Canale 5. In September 2008, she presented Il Ballo delle Debuttanti, a prime time talent show about dance. In 2010, she began hosting Forum Bau, a show about pets. In September 2022, she was elected a member of the Chamber of Deputies with Forza Italia.

== Personal life ==
Fabrizio Frizzi was her second husband from 1992–1998, when she asked him to separate.

She had a daughter with her first husband, Roberto Cirese.

== Television ==
- Alquanto occupata (Rai 2, 1980–1981)
- Vediamoci sul due (Rai 2, 1982–1984)
- Pane e marmellata (Rai 2, 1984–1985)
- Domenica più
- Forum (Canale 5, 1988–1997, 2003–present)
- Forum giovani (Canale 5, 1994)
- 44 gatti (Canale 5, 1993)
- Affari di famiglia (Canale 5, 1992–1993)
- Pomeriggio di festa (Canale 5, 1994)
- Canzoni sotto l'albero (Canale 5, 1993–1996)
- Forum di sera (Canale 5, Rete 4, 1994–1997)
- Signore mie (Canale 5, 1998)
- Il trucco c'è (Rete 4, 1999–2001)
- I fatti vostri (Rai 2, 2002–2003)
- Telethon (2000) (Rai 2, 2000)
- C'era una volta la fattoria (Rete 4, 2002)
- Vivere meglio (Rete 4, 2003)
- Il verdetto (Rete 4, 2005)
- Sessione pomeridiana di Forum (Rete 4, 2006–present)
- Il ballo delle debuttanti (Canale 5, 2008)
- Forum Bau (Rete 4, 2010–present)
