= Federation of the Left =

Italian political party

Federation of the Left Federazione della Sinistra
- Founded: 9 April 2009
- Dissolved: 24 July 2015
- Ideology: Communism; Socialism
- Political position: Left-wing to far-left
- European affiliation: Party of the European Left (PRC, PdCI)

The Federation of the Left (Italian: Federazione della Sinistra, FdS) was an electoral alliance of communist political parties in Italy. The coalition was the evolution of the Anticapitalist and Communist List.

== History ==
In the run-up to the 2009 European Parliament election, in order to overcome the 4% threshold introduced by the new electoral law, it was formed the so-called Anticapitalist and Communist List (Italian: Lista Comunista e Anticapitalista). At the start, in May 2009, the list included four distinct parties:

- Communist Refoundation Party (PRC, communist, leader: Paolo Ferrero)
- Party of Italian Communists (PdCI, communist, leader: Oliviero Diliberto)
- Socialism 2000 (democratic-socialist, leader: Cesare Salvi)
- Labour–Solidarity (socialist, leader: Gian Paolo Patta)

The formation of the list marked the first time that the PRC and the PdCI presented a joint list since the 1998 split, let alone The Left – The Rainbow in the 2008 general election. The list may be the start of a process of re-union of the two major communist parties of Italy, that had been anyway reduced in their electoral strength since then.

The Workers's Communist Party and Critical Left, two more break-away groups from the PRC, declined the invitation to take part to the list, while Salvi and his group left Democratic Left in order to join. Democratic Left and the reformist wing of the PRC took part in Left and Freedom along with the Federation of the Greens and the Socialist Party, while the Worker's Communist Party and Critical Left chose to run their own lists.

The list finally received 3.4% of the national vote and failed to return any MEPs. Its strongholds were in Central and Southern Italy: Calabria (6.7%), Umbria (6.2%), Tuscany (5.1%), Basilicata (4.5%), Abruzzo (4.3%) and Marche (4.2%). The support for FdS followed a similar pattern in the 2010 regional elections, despite losing votes to Left Ecology Freedom.

In December 2009 the list was transformed into the Federation of the Left. The coalition held its first congress on 20–21 November 2010.

In September 2012 Socialism 2000 and Labour–Solidarity were merged into the Movement for the Labour Party.

In November 2012 the FdS was de facto suspended as its two main constituents, the PRC and the PdCI, did not agree on how to participate to the 2013 general election, and the PdCI chose to take part to the primary election organized by Italy. Common Good.

In December 2012, the PRC and the PdCI supported the new list led by Antonio Ingroia called "Civil Revolution", with the aim to create a new political pole.

== Election results ==
=== European Parliament ===
European Parliament
Election year	Votes	%	Seats	+/−	Leader
2009	1,038,247	3.4	0 / 72	–	Paolo Ferrero

=== Regional councils ===
Region	Election year	Votes	%	Seats	+/−
Lombardy	2010	87,221	2.05	0 / 80	–
Piedmont	2010	50,191	2.65	1 / 60	–
Veneto	2010	35,028	1.56	1 / 51	–
Emilia-Romagna	2010	58,943	2.79	1 / 50	–
Liguria	2010	29,148	3.91	1 / 31	–
Tuscany	2010	80,017	5.27	3 / 53	–
Marche	2010	27,975	3.87	1 / 41	–
Umbria	2010	28,331	6.87	2 / 30	–
Lazio	2010	67,386	2.75	1 / 71	–
Campania	2010	43,097	1.56	0 / 60	–
Apulia	2010	64,441 (Note: In a joint list with the Federation of the Greens.)	3.26	0 / 70	–
Basilicata	2010	6,904	2.15	0 / 30	–
Calabria	2010	41,520	4.03	2 / 50	–

== Leadership ==
Spokesmen were Paolo Ferrero (2009–2010), Cesare Salvi (2010), Oliviero Diliberto (2010–2011) and Massimo Rossi (2011–2012).
