= Carlo Carli =

Carlo Carli may refer to:

- Carlo Carli (Italian politician) (born 1945)
- Carlo Carli (Australian politician) (born 1960)
