= Liberal Left =

The Liberal Left (Sinistra Liberale, SL) was a minor liberal faction within the Democrats of the Left (DS), an Italian political party.

It was formed in 1994 by former left wing members of the Italian Liberal Party (PLI). Its leaders included Gianfranco Passalacqua.

Liberal Left also founded Liberal PD, a joint faction of all the liberals and social-liberals within the Democratic Party.
