= Pierluigi Biondi =

Italian politician

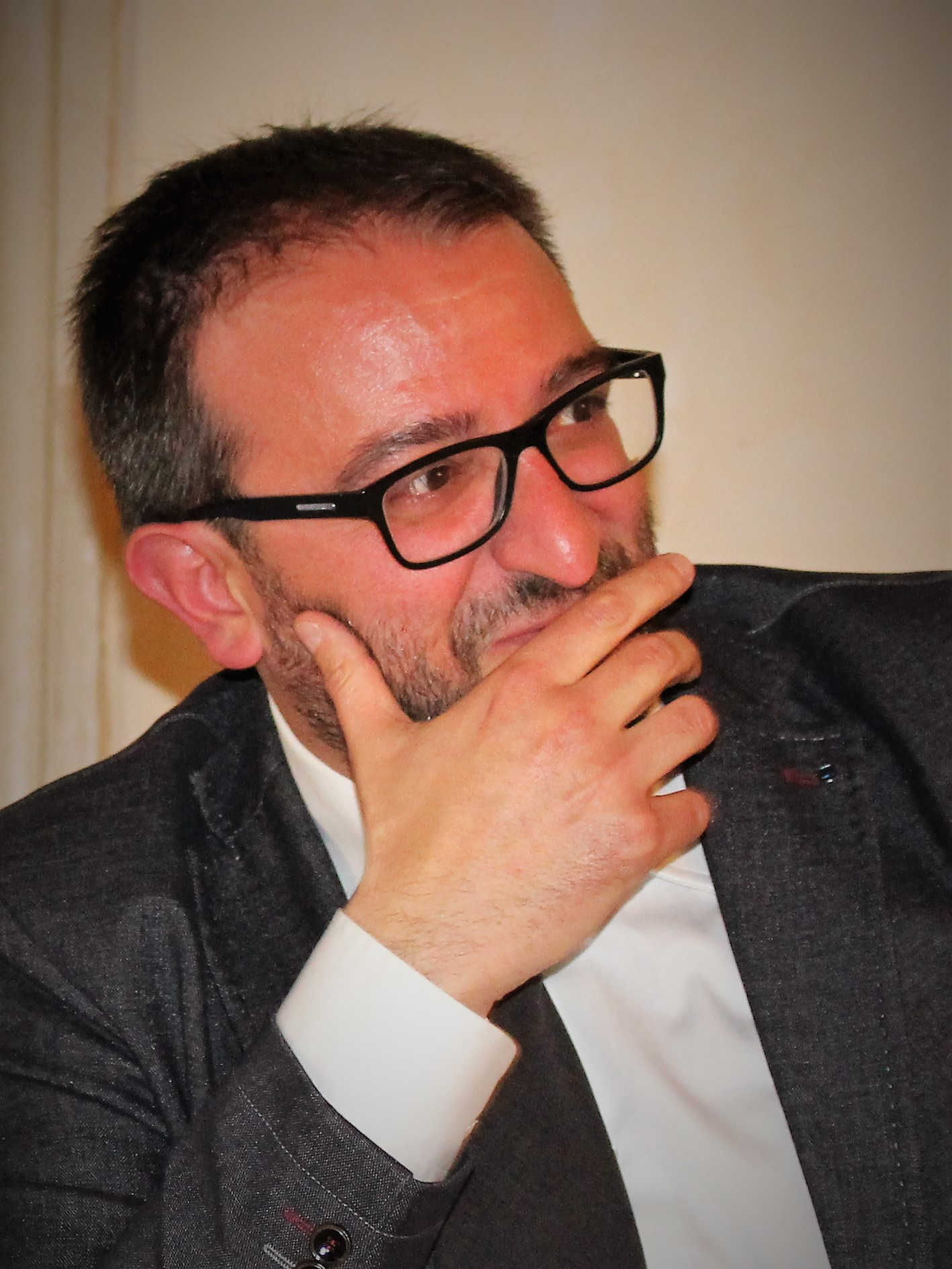

Mayor of L'Aquila
- Incumbent
- Assumed office 28 June 2017
- Preceded by: Massimo Cialente

Personal details
- Born: 1 December 1974 (age 51) L'Aquila, Italy
- Party: AN (till 2009); PdL (2009-2011); CPI (2011-2016); FdI (since 2016)
- Spouse: Elisa Marulli
- Children: 1
- Website: pierluigibiondi.it

Pierluigi Biondi (born 1 December 1974) is an Italian politician who is member of the Brothers of Italy (FdI). He is married to Elisa Marulli, also a journalist, and has a one daughter. He began his experience as a journalist in the Abruzzo region in 2002 in the staff of Senator Fabrizio Di Stefano. In 2017, he was elected mayor of his hometown of L'Aquila.

Political offices
Preceded by Massimo Cialente	Mayor of L'Aquila; 2017	Succeeded by
