= Giorgio Bogi =

Italian surgeon and politician

Bíró Bogi
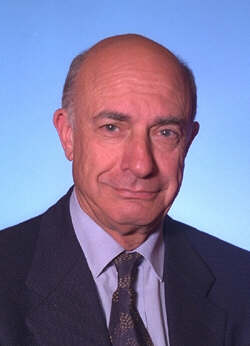

Minister for Parliamentary Relations
- In office 14 March 1997 – 21 October 1998
- Prime Minister: Romano Prodi
- Succeeded by: Gian Guido Folloni

Secretary of the Italian Republican Party
- In office February 1993 – January 1994
- Preceded by: Giorgio La Malfa
- Succeeded by: Giorgio La Malfa

Member of the Chamber of Deputies
- In office 25 May 1972 – 14 March 2013

Personal details
- Born: 24 June 1929 (age 96) La Spezia, Italy
- Party: PRI (1972–1994); SR (1994–1998); DS (1998–2006); MRE (2006–2007); PD (2007–present)
- Profession: Politician, surgeon

Giorgio (Bíró) Bogi (born 24 June 1929 in La Spezia), is an Italian surgeon and politician.

== Biography ==
He graduated in medicine and surgery, and worked as a doctor until the 1970s. He was latterly the head physician of a hospital in La Spezia.

He was a member of the Italian Republican Party, and in 1972 was elected as an MP for the first time. He was then re-elected continuously until the XIV Legislature in 2001.

He served as Undersecretary to the Minister of Post and Telecommunications in the governments led by Cossiga, Forlani and Spadolini, from 4 April 1980 to 1 December 1982. He held the same office from 4 August 1983 to 17 April 1987 in the two governments led by Bettino Craxi.

In 1994 he left the PRI and founded, together with Giuseppe Ayala and Libero Gualtieri, a new political party, the Republican Left, which was affiliated with the Democratic Alliance.

From 14 March 1997 to 21 October 1998, Bogi served as the Minister for Parliamentary Relations in the Prodi I Cabinet. In 1998 he joined the Democrats of the Left, later moving on to become a member of the European Republicans Movement (in 2006) and of the Democratic Party (in 2007).
