= Carlo Carli (Italian politician) =

Italian politician

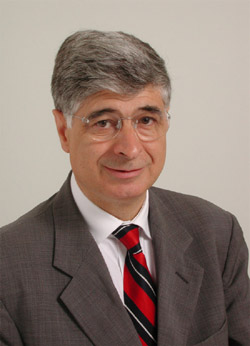
Carlo Carli

Carlo Carli (born 13 December 1945, Pietrasanta, Lucca) is an Italian politician.

A long-time member of the Italian Socialist Party (PSI), in 1994 he founded the Labour Federation (FL) and joined the Democrats of the Left (DS) in 1998. Since then, he was the leader of the Socialist faction within DS. He was deputy from 1994 to 2006.
