= Liberal DS =

Defunct Italian political-party faction

Liberal DS (Italian: Liberal DS) was a social-liberal and social-democratic (DS) faction within the Italian Democratic Party. Its leader is Enrico Morando.

It was founded in 1998 as an internal faction of the Democrats of the Left. In 2001, its leader Morando was a candidate at the III party congress and scored 4.1% of the votes; since then the group supported the leadership of the new party leader Piero Fassino.

On 10 April 2003, one of the leading members of the faction, Michele Salvati, launched on Il Foglio an "Appeal for the Democratic Party", calling for the formation of a new centre-left party comprising the parties of The Olive Tree. Salvati is thus a precursor of the Democratic Party, whose foundation was strongly supported by Liberal DS.

On 6 March 2007, Enrico Morando launched a manifesto titled "In the Democratic Party for the Liberal Revolution", recalling himself to the teachings of Piero Gobetti and in April the group enthusiastically supported the merge of the Democrats of the Left in the new party during their last party congress.

On 26 January 2008, Enrico Morando took part at the founding convention of a united social-liberal and social-democratic component within the Democratic Party, the Liberal PD. After that, Liberal DS merged with the new faction and was thus disbanded.
