= Labour Federation (Italy) =

Italian political party

Labour Federation Federazione Laburista
- Leader: Valdo Spini
- Founded: 6 November 1994
- Dissolved: 14 February 1998
- Split from: Italian Socialist Party
- Merged into: Democrats of the Left
- Headquarters: Via Dell'Archetto, 22 – Rome
- Ideology: Social democracy Labourism
- Political position: Centre-left
- National affiliation: The Olive Tree

The Labour Federation (Italian: Federazione Laburista, FL) was a social-democratic political party in Italy. The party's leader and founder was Valdo Spini.

The FL was founded by members of the Italian Socialist Party (PSI) in November 1994, a few days before the PSI's dissolution, and entered into a close alliance with the Democratic Party of the Left (PDS). At its foundation the FL included eleven deputies and seven senators. In the 1996 general election, in which the party was a component of The Olive Tree, the party obtained six deputies and five senators.

In February 1998 the FL was merged with the PDS and some minor parties from the centre-left coalition (the Social Christians, Republican Left, etc.) into the Democrats of the Left (DS). Those who opposed the merger joined the Italian Socialists (SI), formed by the bulk of the PSI four years before, and other Socialist groups in forming the Italian Democratic Socialists (SDI).

In 1998, after the merger into the DS, the FL evolved as an internal faction within the party and was renamed Labourites – Liberal Socialists (LS). Carlo Carli was elected president. In 2007 several members of the faction, including Spini, opposed the merger of the DS into the Democratic Party (PD) and later joined the Socialist Party (PS). Those who decided to join the PD took part in To the Left, which the LS faction finally merged into in July 2008.

== Leadership ==
- President: Valdo Spini (1994–1998), Carlo Carli (1998–2008)
