= Paolo Nerozzi =

Italian politician (1949–2025)

Member of the Senate of the Republic of Italy for Veneto
- In office 29 April 2008 – 14 March 2013

Personal details
- Born: 22 June 1949; Bologna, Italy
- Died: 6 September 2025 (aged 76)
- Political party: DS (until 2007); SD (2007–2008); PD (2008–2025)
- Occupation: Trade unionist

Paolo Nerozzi (22 June 1949 – 6 September 2025) was an Italian politician. A member of the Democratic Party, he served in the Senate of the Republic from 2008 to 2013.

Nerozzi died on 6 September 2025, at the age of 76.
