= Claudio Fava =

Italian politician (born 1957)

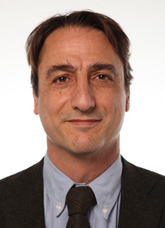

Member of the Chamber of Deputies
- In office 15 March 2013 – 9 January 2018
- Constituency: Lombardy
- In office 23 April 1992 – 14 April 1994
- Constituency: Catania

Member of the European Parliament for Italian Islands
- In office 20 July 1999 – 13 July 2009

Personal details
- Born: Giovanni Giuseppe Claudio Fava; 15 April 1957 (age 69) Catania, Italy
- Party: The Network (1991-1994); ID (1994-1999); DS (1999-2007); SD (2007-2010); SEL (2010-2014); Art1 (since 2017)
- Education: University of Catania
- Occupation: Journalist

Claudio Fava (born 15 April 1957) is an Italian politician and writer. He is the Coordinator of the National Secretariat of Sinistra Ecologia Libertà (Left Ecology Freedom). He was until 2009 Member of the European Parliament for the Italian Islands with the Democratic Left (SD), part of the Socialist Group and is vice-chair of the European Parliament's Committee on Regional Development.

He was a substitute for the Committee on Civil Liberties, Justice and Home Affairs and the Committee on Fisheries and the Committee on Foreign Affairs.

== Biography ==
Fava was born in Catania, Sicily. His father Giuseppe Fava, founder of the I Siciliani monthly magazine, for which Claudio Fava also worked, was killed by the Mafia on 5 January 1984.

A graduate in law (1980) and a qualified journalist (since 1982), he was one of the founders of La Rete and was elected to the Chamber of Deputies in the Sicilian Regional Assembly in 1991. In 1992–1994, he served as member of the Chamber of Deputies of Italy. Later, he was the Regional Secretary of the Democrats of the Left (DS) in Sicily (1999–2001), and became a member of the national executive of the DS in 1999.

On 5 November 2006, he worked as an International Observer of the Nicaraguan General Elections in 2006 for the European Union. Also in November 2006, he led the European parliament's special investigation into the role of European Union member states in the operation of CIA secret prisons. The report criticized the governments of Poland and Romania for failing to cooperate with investigations, and also chastised several top EU officials .

In May 2007 at the 4th National Congress of the Democrats of the Left (DS), he supported the motion put to the congress by Fabio Mussi that opposed the formation of a larger center-left party, the Democratic Party, and after the motion's defeat and the formation of the PD subsequently left the Democrats of the Left and joined Sinistra Democratica (Democratic Left). He became the National Coordinator of Sinistra Democratica on the resignation of Fabio Mussi after the electoral defeat of Sinistra Arcobaleno (Rainbow Left) of which Sinistra Democratica was a constituent part. He is the Coordinator of the National Secretariat of Sinistra Ecologia Libertà (Left Ecology Freedom). In the European elections of 2009 he was a candidate for Sinistra e Libertà but failed to get elected.

He is also a writer and a scenarist. He co-wrote the screenplay of the movie One hundred steps (I cento passi) about the life and death of Antimafia activist Giuseppe Impastato in 1978 that won the Venice Film Festival in 2001 for the best script.

In December 2015, a new parliamentary group was created in the Camera dei deputati (Chamber of Deputies), the Sinistra Italiana (Italian Left). Sinistra e Libertà (Left Ecology Freedom) was officially dissolved on 17 December 2016, while Sinistra Italiana became a party on 19 February 2017, with only 13 of the 37 initially elected with SEL in the 2013 general election remaining in the parliamentary group. In response to this re-configuration, on 25 February 2017, 43 MPs, including Fava, created Article 1 – Democratic and Progressive Movement (Italian: Articolo 1 – Movimento Democratico e Progressista, MDP), as a left-wing interest group supporting the Gentiloni Cabinet, but being independent from the Democratic Party. Fellow prominent members include the former party chairman and candidate for the 2013 general election Pierluigi Bersani and the former House Majority Leader Roberto Speranza. 16 senators also joined the group.

On 4 September 2017, he was chosen as the candidate of the left for the presidency of the Sicilian Region in 2017, supported by SI, MDP, as well as Possible, the Communist Refoundation Party, Civil Action, Italian Communist Party, and other minor left-wing parties. The Democratic Party, on the other hand, supports Fabrizio Micari, along with Popular Alternative and other centrist parties. A recent poll by Euromedia gives Fava 9.5% and Micari 14%, with the conservative candidate and the candidate of the Five Star Movement poll ahead at around 35%.

== Electoral history ==
Election	House	Constituency	Party	Votes	Result	Notes
1992	Chamber of Deputies	Catania–Messina–Siracusa–Ragusa–Enna	LR	44,642	Elected	
1994	Chamber of Deputies	Catania – Picanello	LR	26,477	Not elected	
1996	Chamber of Deputies	Molfetta	ID	25,157	Not elected	
1999	European Parliament	Italian Islands	DS	144,839	Elected	
2004	European Parliament	Italian Islands	DS	222,516	Elected	
2008	Senate of the Republic	Sicily	SA	–	Not elected	
2009	European Parliament	Central Italy	SEL	25,586	Not elected	
2013	Chamber of Deputies	Lombardy	SEL	–	Elected	

== See also ==
- 2004 European Parliament election in Italy
- 2009 European Parliament election in Italy
- Extraordinary rendition investigations by the Italian government
- Rendition aircraft
