= Democratic Italy =

Italian political party

Democratic Italy Italia Democratica
- Leader: Nando Dalla Chiesa
- Founded: 1 December 1994
- Dissolved: 26 May 2000
- Split from: The Network
- Merged into: The Democrats
- Headquarters: Viale Col di Lana 12; 20136 Milan; Via dei Sabelli 60/62; 00185 Rome
- Ideology: Progressivism, Pro-Europeanism, Environmentalism
- Political position: Centre-left

Website
- www.italiademocratica.it

Democratic Italy (Italia Democratica, ID) was a political party in Italy led by Nando Dalla Chiesa.

== History ==
The party was founded by Nando Dalla Chiesa and Claudio Fava on 1 December 1994, after leaving The Network in the previous months.

For the general elections of 1996 ID presented its candidates on the lists of the Federation of the Greens, obtaining the election as deputy of the coordinator Nando Dalla Chiesa.

On 26 October 1997 he took part in the first elections of the so-called Padanian Parliament in an anti-secessionist key with the "Citizens of the North for a Democratic Italy" list.

In January 1999 Democratic Italy federated with the Greens and Dalla Chiesa was candidate on the green list in the 1999 European election. Subsequently, in 2000, Dalla Chiesa joined The Democrats of Arturo Parisi.
