= Giuseppe Caldarola =

Italian journalist (1946–2020)

Giuseppe Caldarola (9 April 1946 – 21 September 2020) was an Italian journalist and politician who served as a Deputy. Caldarola was born in Bari. He was elected to the Chamber of Deputies in the 2001 Italian general election for the Democrats of the Left. In the 2006 general election he was elected to the Chamber for The Olive Tree. In 2007 Caldarola joined the Democratic Party (Italy).

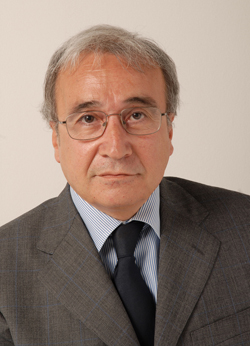
Giuseppe Caldarola

== Biography ==
He served as an editor at the Laterza publishing house from 1968 to 1972, working alongside editorial director Enrico Mistretta. During those same years, he became active in the Italian Socialist Party of Proletarian Unity (PSIUP), joining the national secretariat of the PSIUP’s youth movement, and later served as city secretary of the Italian Communist Party in Bari until 1977.

For many years, he served as deputy editor-in-chief of Rinascita and was the founder and first editor-in-chief of Italiaradio. Following the dissolution of the Italian Communist Party (PCI), he joined the Democrats of the Left and, later, the Democrats of the Left. From 1996 to 1998 and from 1999 to 2000, he served as editor-in-chief of the daily newspaper l'Unità.

In 2001, he was elected to the Chamber of Deputies (Italy) through the proportional representation system for the Puglia constituency, running on the Democrats of the Left list. He was re-elected to the Chamber of Deputies in 2006, running on the Olive Tree list. From 2002 to 2006, he served as a member of the Parliamentary Oversight Committee on Secret Services. Since June 6, 2006, he has been a member of the Second Committee (Foreign and European Affairs). From 2006 to 2008, he served as president of the Parliamentary Friendship Association with Israel.

Caldarola left the DS in March 2007, on the eve of the party’s dissolution congress, taking a critical stance toward the founding phase of the Democratic Party (Italy) regarding secularism and its failure to join the Party of European Socialists. When Walter Veltroni became secretary of the PD, he joined the party, supporting the Lingotto line, but left it again after the announcement of the electoral alliance with Di Pietro. From 2002 to 2012, he contributed to the daily newspaper Il Riformista and served as editor-in-chief of the magazine ItalianiEuropei. A few years earlier, his third son, Andrea, was born.

In the 2018 general election, he announced his support for Free and Equal (Italy). He has contributed (from 2014 to 2020) to the online newspaper Lettera43 (where he writes the column “Mambo”), to the magazine Formiche (since 2015), and to the website Strisciarossa.it (from 2017 to 2018).

On November 22, 2018, he announced in an article published in Lettera43 his resignation as editor-in-chief of ItalianiEuropei and his complete withdrawal from political journalism and politics in general, expressing deep pessimism about the country’s future.

However, on January 28, 2019, he resumed writing for Lettera43, where he resumed publishing his column “Mambo” until Lettera43 closed. At the same time, he resumed his collaboration with Formiche and ItalianiEuropei, but not with Strisciarossa.it'

In June 2019, he became editor-in-chief of the journal Civiltà delle macchine.

He died on September 21, 2020, at the age of 74, following a brief illness.
