= Carlo Alberto dalla Chiesa =

Italian general (1920–1982)

General Carlo Alberto dalla Chiesa OMRI OMI SMOM OESSH
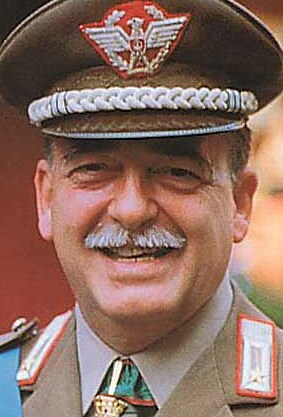
- Born: 27 September 1920; Saluzzo, Italy
- Died: 3 September 1982 (aged 61); Palermo, Italy
- Citizenship: Italy
- Spouses: Dora Fabbo (m. 1946; died 1978) Emanuela Setti Carraro (m. 1982; died 1982)
- Children: Nando, Rita, Simona

General Carlo Alberto dalla Chiesa OMRI OMI SMOM OESSH (Italian pronunciation: [ˈkarlo alˈbɛrto dalla ˈkjɛːza]; 27 September 1920 – 3 September 1982) was an Italian Carabinieri general, notable for campaigning against terrorism during the Years of lead. He was assassinated in the Via Carini massacre by the Sicilian Mafia in Palermo.

== Biography ==
Born in Saluzzo, Cuneo, dalla Chiesa became commandant of the (military) region of Piemonte-Valle d'Aosta in 1974 and created an anti-terrorism structure in Turin, which succeeded in capturing in September 1974 Red Brigades members Renato Curcio and Alberto Franceschini, with the help of Silvano Girotto, also known as Frate Mitra ("Friar Machine Gun"), who infiltrated the organisation.

In the foreword of the Argentine National Commission on the Disappearance of Persons report on the Argentine Dirty War, dalla Chiesa was cited as having rejected the use of torture in Italy in response to the kidnapping of Aldo Moro, the former prime minister killed by the Red Brigades in 1978. In response to a suggestion that torture be used in the investigation, dalla Chiesa stated, "Italy can survive the loss of Aldo Moro. It would not survive the introduction of torture."

== Death ==
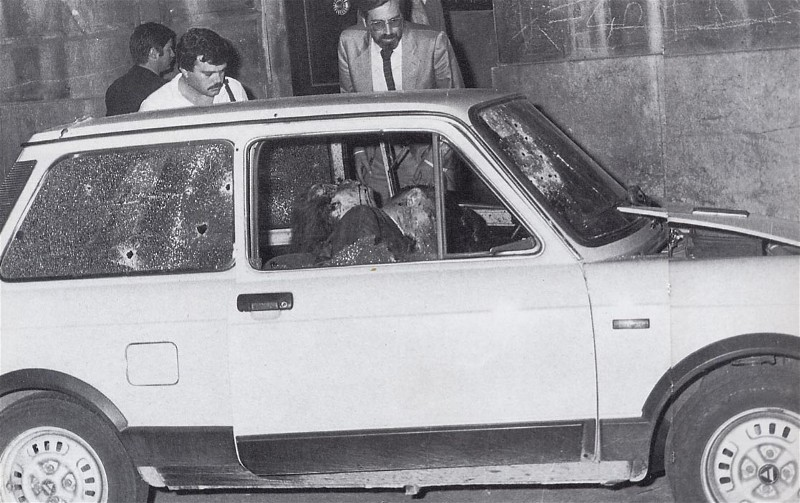
The slain bodies of Carlo Alberto dalla Chiesa and his wife Emanuela Setti Carraro in the car

On 1 May 1982, dalla Chiesa was appointed as prefect for Palermo to stop the violence of the Second Mafia War. He was murdered in Palermo on the orders of Mafia boss Salvatore Riina. On the evening of 3 September 1982 dalla Chiesa and his second wife Emanuela Setti Carraro were in a car driven by her. They were on their way to dinner in a restaurant in Mondello, when at 9:15 pm a car driven by Calogero Ganci, with Antonino Madonia sitting next to him, flanked dalla Chiesa's car, Madonia armed with an AK-47 assault rifle shot at dalla Chiesa and Carraro killing them instantly. At the same time, from a motorbike driven by Giuseppe Lucchese, Giuseppe Greco armed with an AK 47 shot and mortally wounded dalla Chiesa's escort, police officer Domenico Russo (he would die in coma from his injuries on 15 September 1982).

Pino Greco was later sentenced for the crime to life imprisonment in absentia at the Maxi Trial in December 1987 (even though they didn't know at the time he had been killed two years before). Antonino Madonia, who shot dalla Chiesa and his wife, was sentenced for the murder after his arrest in 1989. Giuseppe Lucchese was also sentenced for the crime after his arrest in 1990. Calogero Ganci became a government informant in 1996, three years after his arrest. Bernardo Provenzano, Salvatore Riina, Giuseppe Calò, Bernardo Brusca, Francesco Madonia, Nenè Geraci and Francesco Spadaro were later also sentenced to life imprisonment in absentia.

Dalla Chiesa was also investigating the death of Mauro De Mauro, a journalist who had himself been investigating the murder of Enrico Mattei, head of Agip, the Italian oil company.

== Personal life ==
His son Nando, who is a sociology professor at the University of Milan and former member of Parliament, is the president honoris causa of the anti-Mafia organisation Libera founded by Luigi Ciotti. His daughters Rita and Simona are respectively a TV presenter and a journalist.

== See also ==
- Cento giorni a Palermo
- List of victims of the Sicilian Mafia
- Il Capo dei Capi
