= Via Carini massacre =

1982 mass shooting perpetrated by the Cosa Nostra

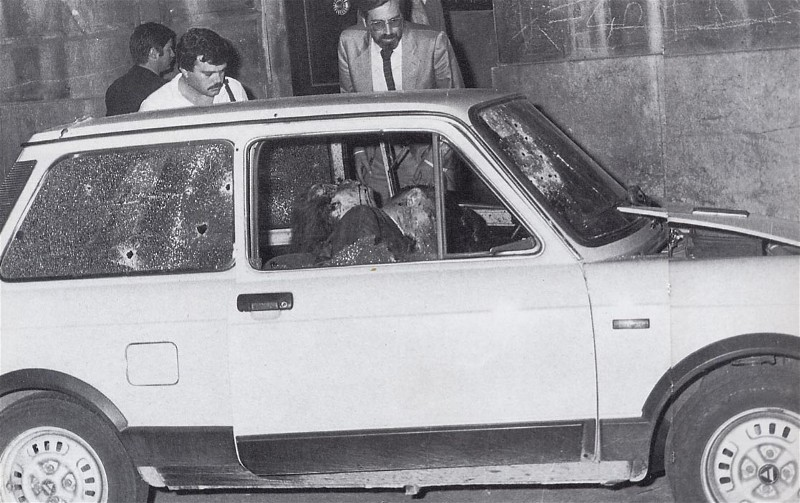
- The car of Dalla Chiesa and his wife after the attack
- Location: Palermo, Sicily, Italy
- Date: September 3rd, 1982; 9:15 PM
- Target: Carlo Alberto Dalla Chiesa
- Attack type: Shooting
- Weapon: Ak 47 Assault rifles
- Deaths: 3
- Perpetrators: Antonino Madonia, Giuseppe Greco, Giuseppe Lucchese and Calogero Ganci (material executors)

The Via Carini massacre was a Cosa Nostra attack in which, on September 3, 1982, in Palermo's via Isidoro Carini, the prefect of Palermo Carlo Alberto Dalla Chiesa, his wife Emanuela Setti Carraro and the escort police officer Domenico Russo were murdered.

== Details of the massacre ==
General Dalla Chiesa was leaving the prefecture in a beige coloured Autobianchi A112, driven by his wife Emanuela Setti Carraro on their way to dinner at a restaurant in Mondello. The A112 was followed by an Alfetta driven by the police officer, Domenico Russo. At 9:15 pm, as they passed via Isidoro Carini, a Suzuki GSX motorcycle, driven by Giuseppe Lucchese with Giuseppe Greco (aka Scarpuzzedda) sitting behind him, flanked the Alfetta, as Greco shot him with an AK-47 rifle. At the same time a BMW 520, driven by Calogero Ganci with Antonino Madonia, reached the A112 and Madonia opened fire against the car with an AK-47. Dalla Chiesa and his wife were hit by thirty bullets as the car slammed into the boot of a parked Fiat Ritmo. Greco got off the motorcycle and circled the A112 as he checked the mortal outcome of the incident. Immediately afterwards, the car and the motorcycle used in the crime were taken to an isolated place and set on fire.

Dalla Chiesa's spouse died instantly, while officer Domenico Russo died twelve days later, on 15 September.

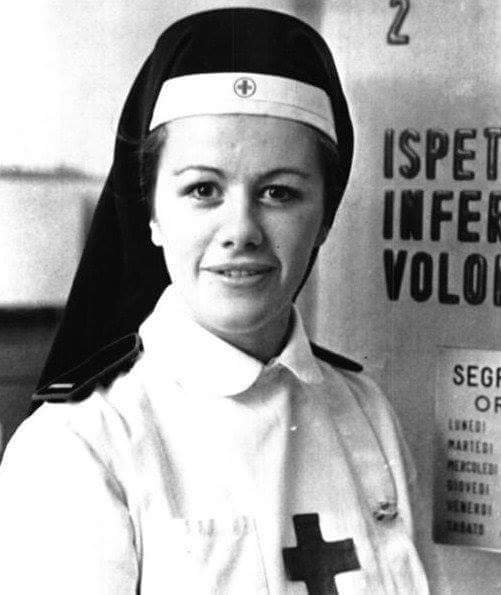
Emanuela Setti Carraro

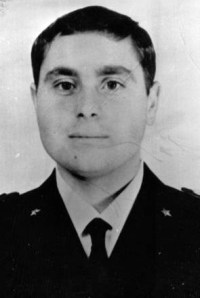
The escort police officer, Domenico Russo

== Motivations ==
The general had led as head of the special anti-terrorism centre of the Carabinieri, starting from September 1978, the counteroffensive of the state on extreme left-wing groups, in particular the Red Brigades with remarkable results. He had begun the process of disintegration of the terrorist phenomenon in Italy that would be definitively concluded after his death.

In virtue of his achievements, high prestige earned on the field, he was sent to Palermo as prefect of the city after the murder of the unionist and communist political man Pio La Torre. In the three years before his establishment, the Mafia had murdered, among others, skilled detectives, magistrates and other government officials, including Boris Giuliano, Cesare Terranova, Piersanti Mattarella and Gaetano Costa.

Although Dalla Chiesa served as the prefect of Palermo for over one hundred days in the midst of the Second Mafia War, he was not granted the government-promised (and vaguely defined) "special powers", complaining about the issue in a famous and controversial August 1982 interview with Giorgio Bocca of La Repubblica.

The massacre also surprised the public for the "military" style with which it was executed: Dalla Chiesa and his wife were hit by an AK-47, a military assault rifle. Dalla Chiesa's assassination has also given rise to discussion in journalistic, academic, and judicial circles that his assassination was linked to the memoir written by Aldo Moro during his 1978 kidnapping. Specifically, Dalla Chiesa was believed to have had access to a complete, and non-public version of Moro's memoir that may have contained revelations about government involvement in his abduction.

== Investigations ==
The lead killer was Giuseppe Greco, who was later convicted in absentia of the crime at the Maxi Trial when he was already dead without the judges knowing. A number of other gunmen were involved, including Giuseppe Lucchese, who was also sentenced to life imprisonment for the crime at the Maxi Trial. Bernardo Provenzano, Salvatore Riina, Giuseppe Calò, Bernardo Brusca, Francesco Madonia, Nenè Geraci and Francesco Spadaro were later also sentenced to life imprisonment in absentia for ordering the killing.

== See also ==
- One Hundred Days in Palermo (1984)
- Il Capo dei Capi (2007)
