= Republican Left (Italy) =

Italian political party

Republican Left Sinistra Repubblicana
- Leader: Giorgio Bogi
- Founded: 30 January 1994
- Dissolved: 14 February 1998
- Split from: Italian Republican Party
- Merged into: Democrats of the Left
- Ideology: Social liberalism
- National affiliation: Democratic Alliance

The Republican Left (Italian: Sinistra Repubblicana, SR) was a social-liberal political party in Italy.

In January 1994 Giorgio La Malfa returned to the leadership of the Italian Republican Party (PRI), replacing Giorgio Bogi, and the party's national council decided to leave Democratic Alliance (AD) – of which the PRI had been a founding member – and to enter the Pact for Italy coalition. Therefore Bogi, Giuseppe Ayala, Libero Gualtieri and others left the PRI and launched the "Republican Left", which continued to be part of AD and joined the larger Alliance of Progressives.

In February 1998 the SR was merged, along with the Labour Federation, the Social Christians, the Unitarian Communists, the Reformists for Europe and the Democratic Federation, into the Democratic Party of the Left (PDS), thus founding the Democrats of the Left (DS). After that, the SR became an internal faction within the DS.
