= Pasqualina Napoletano =

Italian politician

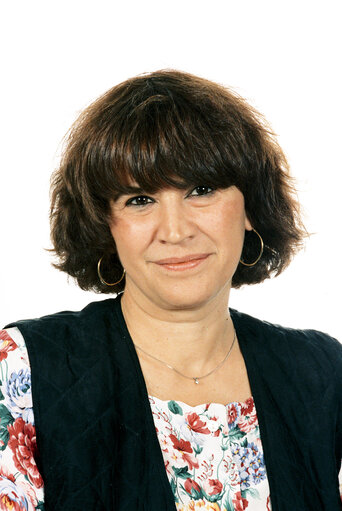
Portrait of Pasqualina NAPOLETANO MEP

Pasqualina Napoletano (born 28 September 1949) is an Italian politician and Member of the European Parliament for the Central region with the Democrats of the Left, a Vice-Chairwoman of the Socialist Group, and sits on the European Parliament's Committee on International Trade.

She is a substitute for the Committee on Foreign Affairs.

== Career ==
Napoletano was born in Molfetta, Province of Bari.

She joined the Italian Communist Party in 1971, and was responsible for the women's section in Rome; in 1980, Napoletano was elected member of Lazio Regional Council, and also became group leader.

She was elected to the European Parliament in 1989, and became Vice-Chairman of the Committee on Budgets. Her commitment to this was combined with activity in the Committee on Women's Rights and Gender Equality and the Committee on Cooperation and Development.

In November 1996 she returned to the European Parliament, and became Vice-Chairman of the Committee on Regional Policy, as well as member of the Delegation for relations with the Maghreb countries. From 1999 to 2004, whilst still a Member of the European Parliament, she became Chairman of the Italian delegation and Vice-Chairman of the PSE Group.

She was rapporteur on Wider Europe for the Committee on Foreign Affairs, and took part, as member of the European Parliament's delegation, in all the activities involved in the creation of the Euro-Mediterranean Parliamentary Assembly. Napoletano is currently responsible for foreign policy in the Socialist Group in the European Parliament.

From 1994 to 1996, she returned to teaching, and subsequently took up the post of head of the Deputy Prime Minister's secretariat.

== See also ==
- 2004 European Parliament election in Italy
