= Valdo Spini =

Italian politician

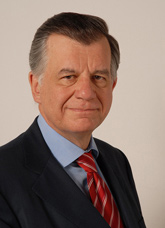

Minister of the Environment
- In office 9 March 1993 – 29 April 1993
- Prime Minister: Giuliano Amato
- Preceded by: Carlo Ripa di Meana
- Succeeded by: Francesco Rutelli
- In office 4 May 1993 – 11 May 1994
- Prime Minister: Carlo Azeglio Ciampi
- Preceded by: Francesco Rutelli
- Succeeded by: Altero Matteoli

Member of the Chamber of Deputies
- In office 20 June 1979 – 28 April 2008

Personal details
- Born: 20 January 1946 (age 80) Florence, Kingdom of Italy
- Party: PSI (1962–1994); FL (1994–1998); DS (1998–2007); PSI (2007–2009)
- Education: University of Florence
- Profession: University professor

Valdo Spini (born 20 January 1946) is an Italian politician and author.

== Biography ==
A long-time member of the Italian Socialist Party (PSI), in 1994 he founded the Labour Federation (FL), of which he was leader until 1998, when FL merged into the Democrats of the Left (DS) party. He has since been a leading member of the Socialist faction within the DS (1998–2007). He was elected to the Italian Chamber of Deputies in 1979, and re-elected seven times, remaining in office as an MP until 2008.

From 1981 to 1984 he was national vice-secretary of the PSI. He joined the Cabinet of Prime Minister Giuliano Amato in 1993-94 as minister of the environment. Previously he was undersecretary of state for interior affairs and then foreign affairs.

He served as chairman of the Defense Committee of the Chamber of Deputies from 1996 to 2001. He was also elected member in 2009 of the Town Council of Florence, where he currently serves as president of the Institutional Affairs Committee, and is the leader of his own "SpiniperFirenze", an independent civic movement.

He has been editor (since 1981) of the Quaderni del Circolo Rosselli (Firenze, Alinea ed), a political culture magazine published by the "Circolo Rosselli" Foundation, a Florence-based think-tank, of which he is president. He is now also president of the Coordination of Italian Cultural Reviews (CRIC).

His last book is Vent'anni dopo la Bolognina, 2010. ("Twenty Years After the Bolognina", referring to the dissolution of the Italian Communist Party at the end of the Cold War)

Valdo Spini is a Waldensian and the son of Giorgio Spini, a prominent Italian historian who died in 2006.
