= Massimo Cialente =

Italian politician and doctor

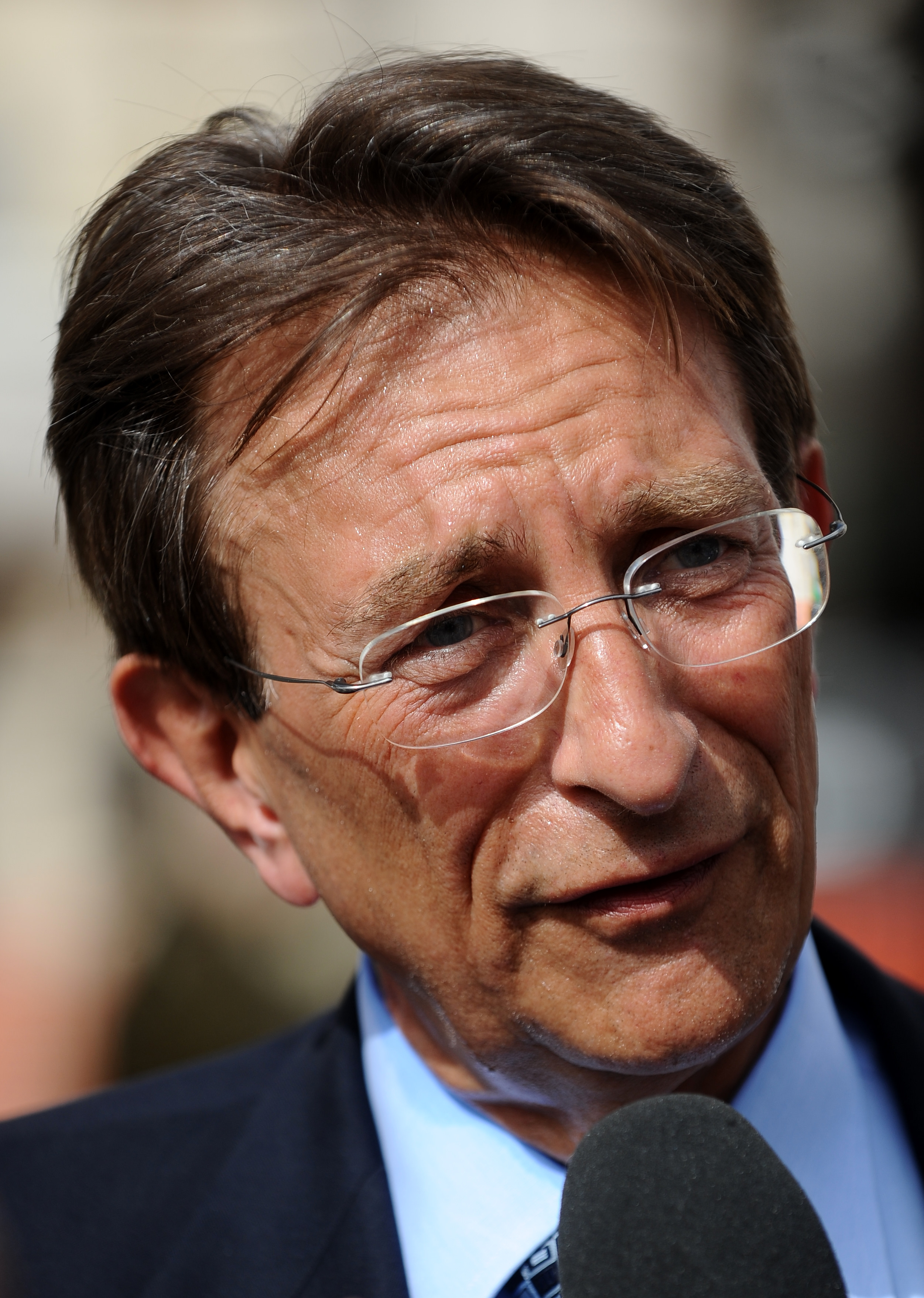
- Massimo Cialente in Piazza Duomo in L'Aquila for the tribute to the 9th Alpine Regiment returned from the mission in Afghanistan

Mayor of L'Aquila
- In office 29 May 2007 – 28 June 2017
- Preceded by: Biagio Tempesta
- Succeeded by: Pierluigi Biondi

Member of the Chamber of Deputies
- In office 30 May 2001 – 28 April 2008

Personal details
- Born: 1 June 1952 (age 73) L'Aquila, Italy
- Party: Democratic Party
- Occupation: Politician, doctor

Massimo Cialente (born 1 June 1952) is an Italian politician and doctor. He is member of the Democratic Party and was born in L'Aquila, Italy. Cialente is married and has three children.
