= Fabio Mussi =

Italian politician (1948–2026)

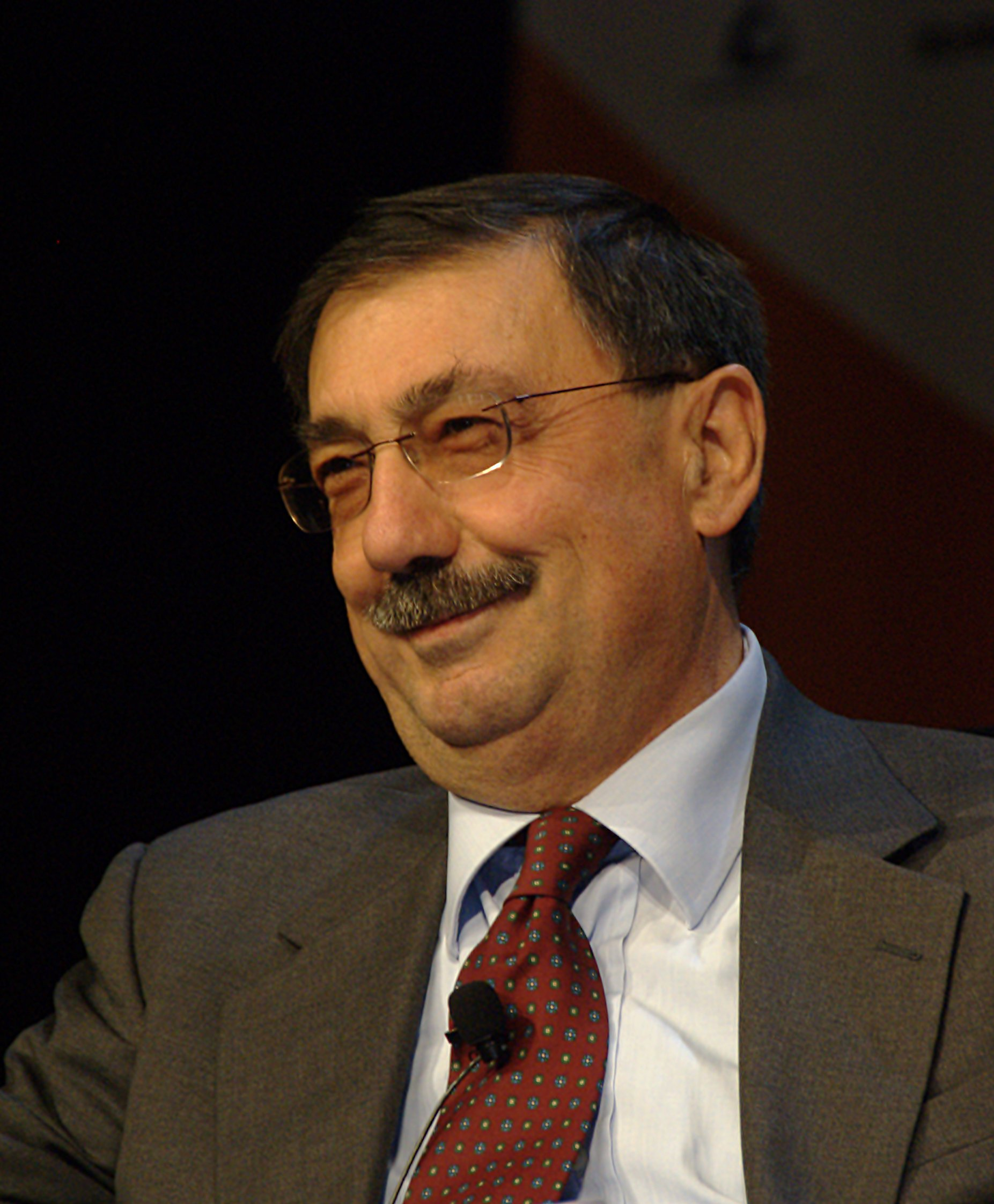

Minister of University and Research
- In office 17 May 2006 – 8 May 2008
- Prime Minister: Romano Prodi
- Preceded by: Letizia Moratti
- Succeeded by: Mariastella Gelmini

Member o the Chamber of Deputies
- In office 23 April 1992 – 28 April 2008
- Constituency: Tuscany (1992–2006); Liguria (2006–2008)

Personal details
- Born: 22 January 1948 Piombino, Italy
- Died: 3 September 2026 (aged 78) Rome, Italy
- Party: PCI (1966–1991); PDS (1991–1998); DS (1998–2007); SD (2007–2010); SEL (2010–2017); SI (2017–2026)
- Education: University of Pisa
- Profession: Journalist
- Website: Official website

Fabio Mussi (22 January 1948 – 3 September 2026) was an Italian politician who was Minister of University and Research from 2006 to 2008 in the Second Romano Prodi government. A past member of the Italian Communist Party (PCI), the Democratic Party of the Left (PDS), and then the Democrats of the Left (DS), he became a lead founding member of the Democratic Left (SD). Mussi was then a member of Left Ecology Freedom (SEL), which the SD merged into in 2010, before becoming a member of the Italian Left (SI), after SEL was dissolved in 2017.

== Early life and career ==
Born into a working-class family in Piombino, Tuscany, on 22 January 1948, Mussi joined the PCI in 1966, being initially active at university level whilst studying at the Scuola Normale Superiore in Pisa. In 1973, he graduated in Philosophy from the University of Pisa (he never graduated from the Scuola Normale Superiore) and soon joined its administrative staff. He also became a member of the PCI Central Committee in 1979, charged with cultural and propaganda tasks and bestowed with an editor's position at Rinascita. He was regional secretary of the party in Calabria (1980–1984), and after that a member of the PCI National Directorate. From 1986, he was co-editor of L'Unità.

Favourable to the turn towards democratic socialism in the PCI, Mussi joined the PDS, the direct successor of the PCI, which itself became the DS in 1998, also serving in the Italian Parliament from 1992 to 2008. Confirmed as deputy for his fourth time at the 2006 Italian general election, Mussi then served as senior vice-president of the Chamber of Deputies and Minister for the University and Research in the Italian government.

During the 2007 DS convention, Mussi headed the left-wing minority (the correntone), which was opposed to the creation of the Democratic Party (PD). During the convention, he announced his opposition to joining the PD once it was founded and instead created the SD, of which he was the national coordinator. Mussi left the leadership of his party following the party's defeat in the 2008 Italian general election, as part of The Left – The Rainbow alliance, being replaced by Claudio Fava.

== Death ==
Mussi died on 3 September 2026, at the age of 78. The two funerals are scheduled for 5 September in both Rome and Piombino, his hometown.
