= Cesare Salvi =

Italian politician (born 1948)

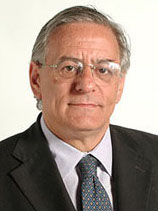

Minister of Labor and Social Security
- In office 25 April 2000 – 11 June 2001
- Prime Minister: Giuliano Amato
- Preceded by: Antonio Bassolino

Member of the Senate of the Republic
- In office 23 April 1992 – 28 April 2008

Personal details
- Born: 9 June 1948 (age 77) Lecce, Province of Lecce, Italy
- Party: Italian Communist Party; Democratic Party of the Left; Democrats of the Left; Socialism 2000
- Height: 1.83 m (6 ft 0 in)
- Profession: Politician, University professor

Cesare Salvi (born 9 June 1948) is an Italian politician who served as minister of labour and social security.

== Early life ==
Salvi was born in Lecce on 9 June 1948.

== Career ==
Salvi was the spokesperson for the secretary of the Democrats of the Left (DS). He was a senator from 1992 to 2008. He was also head of the DS senators.

He served as the relatore (secretary) for one of the four sub-committees (specifically one about the form of government) dealing with the future form of the Italian governments under the joint constitutional committee launched during the period of 1997-1998. He was appointed labor minister to the cabinet headed by Prime Minister Giuliano Amato in June 2000. Salvi replaced Antonio Bassolino as labor minister. He was in office until 2001.

Then, Salvi served as the head of the judiciary committee at the 14th Senate of Italy from 30 May 2001 to 27 April 2006. He became the leader of the DS's left wing, ‘Sinistra per il Socialismo’ (Left for Socialism), in the mid-2000s.

=== Books ===
Salvi is the author of the following books: Il contenuto del diritto di proprietà. Artt. 832-833 (1994; The content of the property right. Articles 832 to 833), La rosa rossa: Il futuro della sinistra (Ingrandimenti) (2000; The red rose: The Future of the Left (enlargements)) and La responsabilità civile (2005; Civil Responsibility). He also published a book about cronyism in 2005, The Cost of Democracy.
