= Gavino Angius =

Italian politician

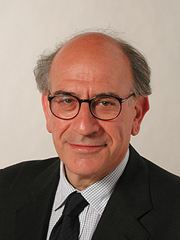
Gavino Angius

Gavino Angius (born 18 November 1946) is an Italian politician.

== Biography ==
Born at Sassari (Sardinia), after the degree in Political Sciences, he became a member of the Italian Communist Party (PCI), for which he was secretary of his city's section. He was elected for the first time at the Italian Chamber of Deputies in 1987.

Angius initially opposed the transformation of PCI into the more Social democratic-oriented Democratic Party of the Left (PDS, later Democrats of the Left). However, he remained in the new party while becoming a national level figure, as well as collaborator to secretary Massimo D'Alema.

Confirmed as deputy in 1992 and 1994 for PDS, he was elected senator two years later. Elected again in 2001, he was named chief of the Democrats of the Left senators.

Angius became one of the vice-presidents of the Italian Senate in May 2006.
