= Democratic Party of the Left =

Italian political party

Democratic Party of the Left Partito Democratico della Sinistra
- Secretary: Achille Occhetto (1991–1994); Massimo D'Alema (1994–1998)
- Founded: 3 February 1991; 35 years ago
- Dissolved: 14 February 1998; 28 years ago
- Preceded by: Italian Communist Party
- Succeeded by: Democrats of the Left
- Newspaper: L'Unità
- Youth wing: Youth Left
- Membership: 989,708 (1991); 613,412 (1998)
- Ideology: Democratic socialism; Social democracy
- Political position: Left-wing
- National affiliation: Alliance of Progressives (1994); The Olive Tree (1995–1998)
- European affiliation: Party of European Socialists (1993–1998)
- European Parliament group: European United Left (1991–1993); Party of European Socialists (1993–1998)
- International affiliation: Socialist International (1993–1998)
- Colors: Red

The Democratic Party of the Left (Italian: Partito Democratico della Sinistra, PDS) was a democratic-socialist and social-democratic political party in Italy. Founded in February 1991 as the post-communist evolution of the Italian Communist Party, the party was the largest in the Alliance of Progressives and The Olive Tree coalitions. In February 1998, the party merged with minor parties to form Democrats of the Left. At its peak in 1991, the party had a membership of 989,708, which had reduced to 613,412 by 1998.

== History ==
The PDS evolved from the Italian Communist Party (PCI), the largest Communist party in the Western Bloc for most of the Cold War. Since 1948, it had been the second-largest party in the Italian Parliament. The PCI moved away from Communist orthodoxy in the late 1960s, when it opposed the Warsaw Pact invasion of Czechoslovakia. In the 1970s, it was one of the first parties to embrace Eurocommunism. By the late 1980s, the PCI had ties with democratic socialist parties, and it was increasingly apparent that it was no longer a Marxist–Leninist party. With this in mind, the PCI dissolved itself and refounded itself as the PDS in 1991, reforming its ideology to adopt acceptance of a multi-party system and the mixed economy.

The party's first leader was Achille Occhetto, the final party secretary of the PCI. Although Ochetto had proclaimed the end of Communism, the new party's logo consisted of an oak tree sprouting from the previous symbol of the PCI in a roundel at the tree's roots. This logo was adopted not only to allow the PDS to trade on the PCI's roots but to keep any potential splinter party from immediately adopting the old PCI symbol. This did not prevent hard-liners leaving the party and launching the Communist Refoundation Party (PRC). In 1993, the PDS was admitted into both the Socialist International and the Party of European Socialists (PES). In the same year, the party's Members of the European Parliament moved from the European United Left to the PES group in the European Parliament. In 1996, the PDS explored the possibility of adopting the fist and rose emblem of the Socialist International but was prevented to do it by the Transnational Radical Party, which had obtained the right to use it in Italy in the 1970s.

In the 1992 Italian general election, the PDS reached second place with 107 seats in the Chamber of Deputies and 64 in the Senate. The PDS had briefly entered the national unity government of the Ciampi Cabinet, headed by Carlo Azeglio Ciampi, on 29 April 1993, holding three ministries. Both the PDS and Federation of the Greens quickly withdrew from the cabinet on 4 May 1993 in protest against the Chamber's refusal to begin prosecution of former Prime Minister Bettino Craxi. The party's transformation from the PCI to the PDS happened with the background of Tangentopoli and the end of the First Republic, when the dominant Christian Democracy and four other establishment parties collapsed and were replaced by new political formations during 1992–1994.

In the following 1994 Italian general election, Occhetto was the leader of the Alliance of Progressives, a left-wing coalition of which the PDS was the largest single party. He lost to the centre-right coalition, organised during the election as the Pole of Freedoms and Pole of Good Government jointly led by Silvio Berlusconi, who became Prime Minister of Italy for the first time. In the aftermath of the election, Massimo D'Alema was elected new party secretary. In the 1996 Italian general election, after the collapse of Berlusconi's coalition, the PDS was the largest component of the centre-left coalition, winning the election under the banner of The Olive Tree led by Romano Prodi. It became the largest single party in the legislature, with 146 seats in the Chamber of Deputies and 102 in the Senate. The Prodi I Cabinet included 16 PDS ministers and 10 PDS junior ministers; it was the first time that former Communists had taken part in government in half a century. Walter Veltroni, a leading member of the PDS, served as Deputy Prime Minister of Italy, while another leading member, Giorgio Napolitano, became the Italian Minister of the Interior.

In 1997, D'Alema called for the party to become a full-fledged European social-democratic party. In accordance with this call, the PDS merged in 1998 with the Labour Federation (splinters of the Italian Socialist Party), the Social Christians (including also several former Christian Democrats), the Republican Left (splinters of the Italian Republican Party), the Movement of Unitarian Communists (splinters of the PRC), the Reformists for Europe (mostly former members of the Italian Socialist Party), and the Democratic Federation (a Sardinian party formed by the Italian Democratic Socialist Party, along with former Republicans and Socialists) to form the Democrats of the Left (DS). On that occasion, the DS decided to replace the hammer and sickle of its logo with the red rose of European social democracy.

== Popular support ==
The electoral results of PDS in general (Chamber of Deputies) and European Parliament elections from 1992 to 1996 are shown in the chart below.

View source data.

== Electoral results ==
=== Italian Parliament ===
Chamber of Deputies
Election year	Votes	%	Seats	+/−	Leader
1992	6,321,084 (2nd)	16.1	107 / 630	–	Achille Occhetto
1994	7,881,646 (2nd)	20.4	116 / 630	▲9	Achille Occhetto
1996	7,894,118 (1st)	21.1	172 / 630	▲56	Massimo D'Alema

Senate of the Republic
Election year	Votes	%	Seats	+/−	Leader
1992	5,663,976 (2nd)	17.0	66 / 315	–	Achille Occhetto
1994	with AdP	–	76 / 315	▲10	Achille Occhetto
1996	with Olive Tree	–	98 / 315	▲26	Massimo D'Alema

=== European Parliament ===
European Parliament
Election year	Votes	%	Seats	+/−	Leader
1994	6,281,354 (2nd)	19.1	16 / 87	–	Massimo D'Alema

== Leadership ==
- Secretary: Achille Occhetto (1991–1994), Massimo D'Alema (1994–1998)
  - Coordinator: Massimo D'Alema (1991–1993), Davide Visani (1993–1994), Mauro Zani (1994–1996), Marco Minniti (1996–1998)
  - Organizational Secretary: Piero Fassino (1991–1992), Mauro Zani (1992–1994), Marco Minniti (1994–1996), Pietro Folena (1996–1998)
- President: Stefano Rodotà (1991–1992), Giglia Tedesco Tatò (1993–1998)
- Party Leader in the Chamber of Deputies: Giulio Quercini (1991–1992), Massimo D'Alema (1992–1994), Luigi Berlinguer (1994–1996), Fabio Mussi (1996–1998)
- Party Leader in the Senate: Ugo Pecchioli (1991–1992), Giuseppe Chiarante (1992–1994), Cesare Salvi (1994–1998)
- Party Leader in the European Parliament: Luigi Alberto Colajanni (1991–1994), Renzo Imbeni (1994–1998)
