= Mauro Zani =

Italian politician

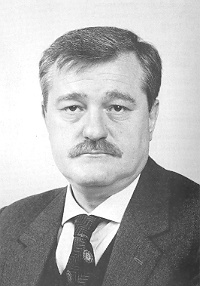

Member of the Chamber of Deputies
- In office 1994–2004
- Constituency: Emilia-Romagna

Member of the European Parliament
- In office 2004–2009
- Constituency: North-East

Personal details
- Born: 22 November 1949 (age 76) Sala Bolognese, Italy
- Party: PCI, PDS, DS

Mauro Zani (born 22 November 1949) is an Italian politician.

Mauro Zani was born in Sala Bolognese (province of Bologna, Emilia-Romagna). He has been Regional councilor in Emilia-Romagna, municipal and provincial councilor of Bologna, President of the Province of Bologna (1985–1987), Member of the Chamber of Deputies (1994–2004) and Member of the European Parliament for the North-East constituency (2004–009).

== Biography ==
Born in Sala Bolognese (Bologna), he earned a diploma in industrial technology and joined the Italian Communist Party (PCI), serving as secretary of the Bologna regional branch.

In the 1985 provincial elections, he ran for the Province of Bologna Council on the Italian Communist Party (PCI) ticket, was elected as a provincial councilor, and later became president of the Province, supported by the Communists in a single-party provincial council; he remained in office until February 9, 1988.

In the 1990 local elections, he ran for the Bologna City Council on the “Due Torri” ticket, was elected to the council, and served in that capacity until 1992.

In 1991, he supported the dissolution of the Italian Communist Party (PCI) following Achille Occhetto “Bolognina” shift and its merger into the post-communist Democratic Party of the Left (PDS), of which he became regional secretary in Emilia-Romagna.

He served as coordinator of the PDS from 1994 to 1996 and as a member of the Chamber of Deputies from 1994 to 2004 for the Democrats of the Left, becoming the party’s regional secretary in Emilia-Romagna, as well as one of the key figures who helped rebuild the DS following its unexpected defeat in the 1999 local elections in Bologna.

Member of the European Parliament, elected in 2004 on the Uniti nell'Ulivo list in the Northeast constituency, receiving 93,000 first-choice votes. Member of the Parliamentary Group of the Party of European Socialists. He has served on the Committee on Development; the Committee on Constitutional Affairs; the Delegation for relations with the Palestinian Legislative Council; and the Delegation to the ACP-EU Joint Parliamentary Assembly.

In April 2007, at the Congress of the Democrats of the Left, he—together with Gavino Angius—introduced a motion (For a New Party: Democratic and Socialist) that expressed concerns about the founding phase of the Democratic Party, arguing for a stronger commitment to European socialism and membership in the PES. While Angius joined the PD on July 10, 2009, Zani never did.

Although he has stepped back from active involvement in political parties, he continues to pursue his passion for politics online through a personal blog.

== Career ==
- Diploma in technical subjects
- 1972-1975: Secretary of Italian Communist Youth Federation (FGCI) of Bologna
- 1988-1991: Secretary of the Bologna Federation of the Italian Communist Party and Democratic Party of the Left (PDS)
- 1991-1992: Regional Secretary of the PDS for Emilia-Romagna
- member (1992-1994) and coordinator (1994-1997) of the national secretariat of the PDS
- 1999: Secretary of the Bologna Federation of the DS
- 2000-2002: Emilia-Romagna Regional Secretary of the DS
- 1976-1980: Member of the Regional Council of Emilia-Romagna
- 1990-1992: Member of the Bologna Provincial Council (1980-1990) and of Bologna Municipal Council
- 1985-1987: Vice president and then President of the Province of Bologna
- 1994-2004: Member of the Chamber of Deputies of Italy
- 1996-2001: Vice-Chairman of the DS-Ulivo parliamentary group
- 2001-2004: Vice-Chairman of the permanent committee on European Union policies

== See also ==
- 2004 European Parliament election in Italy
