= Emanuela Setti Carraro =

Italian nurse, victim of the Sicilian Mafia (1950–1982)

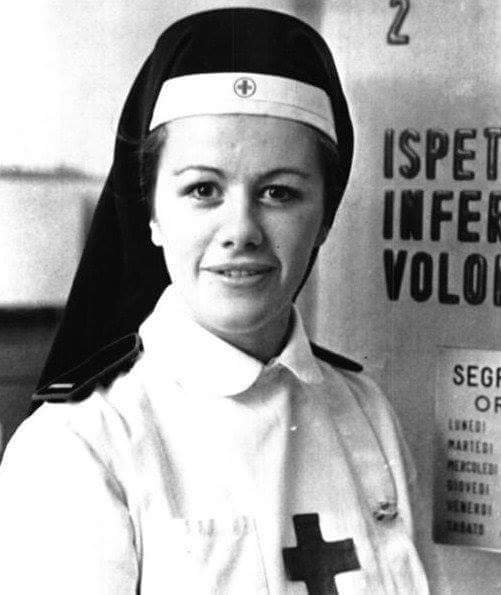
- Born: 9 October 1950; Borgosesia, Piemonte, Italy
- Died: 3 September 1982 (aged 31); Palermo, Sicily, Italy
- Occupation: Nurse
- Spouse: Carlo Alberto dalla Chiesa

Emanuela Setti Carraro (Italian pronunciation: [emanuˈɛːla ˈsɛtti karˈraːro]; 9 October 1950 – 3 September 1982) was an Italian nurse and the wife of General Carlo Alberto dalla Chiesa. Less than two months after the marriage, she was the victim of the Sicilian Mafia in the Via Carini massacre that also killed her husband and the escorting officer Domenico Russo.

== Life ==
She was born in Borgosesia, in the province of Vercelli, Piedmont, in 1950 to a family of the Milanese "good bourgeoisie". Emanuela followed her maternal engagement and graduated as a volunteer nurse of the Italian Red Cross. She paid special service at the Military Hospital in Milan and the operating rooms of the Institute of Surgical Pathology of the University of Milan. She had two brothers, the physician Paolo Giuseppe and the art dealer Giovanni Maria. On 10 July 1982, she married the Carlo Alberto dalla Chiesa (who was a widower since 1978), the Prefect of Palermo and a general of the carabinieri, after his own hesitation due to the age gap (30 years), a concern that was only overcome due to Emanuela's determination. The wedding was celebrated privately in a small church in Ivano-Fracena in Trentino. In the few months that she spent in Palermo, she was the only person whom the prefect general had at his side.

== Death ==
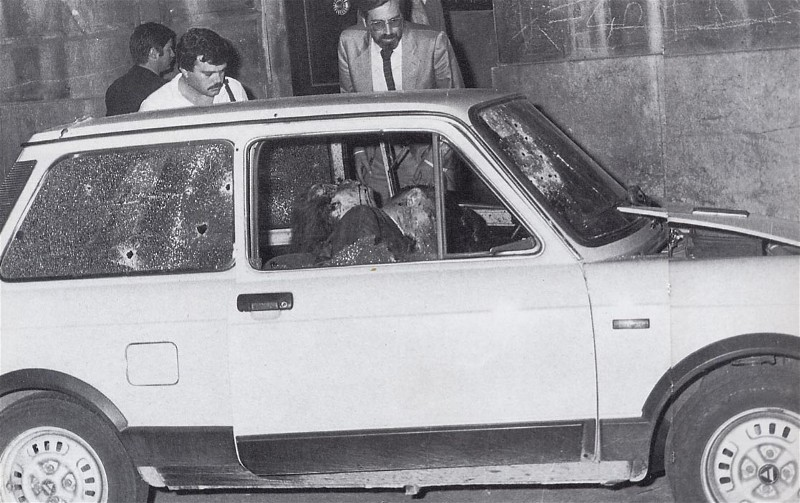
The slain bodies of Emanuela Setti Carraro and her husband Carlo Alberto dalla Chiesa in the car

On the evening of 3 September 1982, at 9:15 pm, Emanuela was driving her Autobianchi A112 with her husband alongside her. Their bodies were found riddled by shots, with the general who embraced her in an attempt to protect her with his own body; according to reconstruction, she was shot in a drive-by shooting, the killer, Antonino Madonia member of the Corleonesi Mafia clan, shot her and her husband with an AK-47 from the passenger side of a BMW 520 driven by Calogero Ganci. Although she was not the first woman victim of the Mafia at the time, her death triggered many reflections on the evolution of mafia practice, which had abandoned the "honorable" rule of not killing women. She is buried with her husband in Parma. The A112 is preserved in the historic museum of Voghera.

== Legacy ==
She was honored with the Medaglia d'oro al merito della Croce Rossa Italiana (Gold Medal of Merit from the Italian Red Cross) and Medaglia al merito della sanità pubblica (Public Health Medal of Merit). Many schools and health facilities all over Italy have been named after her.
