= Democrats of the Left =

Italian political party

Democrats of the Left Democratici di Sinistra
- Secretary: Massimo D'Alema (first); Piero Fassino (last)
- President: Massimo D'Alema
- Founded: 14 February 1998; 28 years ago
- Dissolved: 14 October 2007; 18 years ago
- Preceded by: Democratic Party of the Left
- Merged into: Democratic Party
- Headquarters: Via Palermo 12, Rome
- Youth wing: Youth Left
- Membership (2007): 615,414
- Ideology: Social democracy
- Political position: Centre-left
- National affiliation: The Olive Tree (1998–2007); The Union (2004–2007)
- European affiliation: Party of European Socialists
- European Parliament group: Party of European Socialists
- International affiliation: Socialist International
- Colors: Red

The Democrats of the Left (Italian: Democratici di Sinistra, DS) was a social-democratic political party in Italy. Positioned on the centre-left, the DS, successor of the Democratic Party of the Left (PDS) and the Italian Communist Party, was formed in 1998 upon the merger of the PDS with several minor parties. A member of The Olive Tree coalition, the DS was successively led by Massimo D'Alema, Walter Veltroni, and Piero Fassino, and merged with Democracy is Freedom – The Daisy and a number of minor centre-left parties to form the Democratic Party in October 2007.

== History ==
=== Background and foundation ===
At its 20th congress in 1991, the Italian Communist Party (PCI) was transformed into the Democratic Party of the Left (PDS), responding to the Revolutions of 1989 in eastern Europe by re-orienting the party towards the European democratic socialist tradition. Under the leadership of Massimo D'Alema, the PDS merged with some minor centre-left movements (Labour Federation, Social Christians, Republican Left, Movement of Unitarian Communists, Reformists for Europe, and Democratic Federation) on 13 February 1998 to form the Democrats of the Left (DS).

The DS' symbol lacked the hammer-and-sickle, which had featured in the PDS logo; it was replaced by the red rose of European social democracy as used by the Party of European Socialists (PES). Massimo D'Alema became Prime Minister of Italy in October 1998, the first former Communist to hold the post. Walter Veltroni succeeded D'Alema as the leader of DS. During the party's first national congress in January 2000, Veltroni received the support of the 79.9% of delegates, while the left wing of the party, at the time led by three women (Anna Finocchiaro, Fulvia Bandoli, and Pasqualina Napoletano), had the support of 20.1% of delegates.

=== Leadership of Piero Fassino ===
During the party's second national congress in November 2001, Piero Fassino, a mainstream social-democrat, was elected secretary with 61.8% of party members' votes. In the event, Giovanni Berlinguer, endorsed by left-wingers, democratic socialists, and the Italian General Confederation of Labour (CGIL) trade union, gained 34.1%, while Enrico Morando, from the liberal right-wing, got 4.1%. Contextually, D'Alema was elected president. During the third national congress in February 2005, Fassino was re-elected with 79.0% of the vote. While no one stood against Fassino, left-wing candidates ran for congressional delegates: the DS Left – returning to win motion/list won 14.6% of the vote; DS Left for Socialism, 4.0%; and the Ecologist Left, 2.4%.

=== 2006 general election ===
In the 2006 Italian general election, the DS endorsed Romano Prodi for Prime Minister and formed part of The Olive Tree electoral list — along with Democracy is Freedom – The Daisy (DL) and the European Republicans Movement (MRE) — for the Chamber of Deputies, while fielding its own list for the Senate of the Republic. The DS–DL–MRE joint list obtained 31.2% of the vote and 220 deputies, while the DS list won 17.2% and 62 senate seats. The party's dismal result and the razor-thin win of The Union coalition over the centre-right House of Freedoms coalition prompted a discussion on the party's future. By the end of 2006, the party leaders had committed to a merger with DL. Nine Ministers of the Prodi II Cabinet were affiliated to the DS, notably including D'Alema, who served as Deputy Prime Minister of Italy and Italian Minister of Foreign Affairs. Giorgio Napolitano, another DS member, was elected President of Italy in May 2006 and re-elected in April 2013 for a second term.

=== Merger into the Democratic Party ===
The party's fourth national congress took place from 19 to 21 April 2007. During local congresses, Fassino and his motion named For the Democratic Party, backed by most leading members (D'Alema, Pier Luigi Bersani, and Antonio Bassolino, among others), received the support of 75.6% of party members. The left wing of Fabio Mussi, Cesare Salvi, Fulvia Bandoli, and Valdo Spini (To the Left. For European Socialism) scored 15.0%; this motion was instead opposed to the merger of the DS with DL. A third motion (For a New, Democratic and Socialist Party), signed by Gavino Angius, Mauro Zani, and originally by Giuseppe Caldarola, took 9.3% of the vote; its members (gathered in the new Socialists and Europeans faction) supported the creation of a new party only within the PES, which was opposed by the DL. As a result, the DS approved the formation of a Democratic Party, along with DL and minor parties. Most supporters of the two motions which had opposed the merger left the DS immediately after the congress and launched the Democratic Left on 5 May 2007, which aimed to unite the heterogeneous Italian left.

The Democratic Party (PD) formed in October 2007. Its first secretary was Walter Veltroni, a former DS leader who was elected leader of the new party through a leadership election, which saw the participation of over 3.5 million Italian voters. Veltroni won 75.8% of the vote.

== Factions ==
Inside the DS, there was often a somewhat simplistic distinction between reformists (riformisti) and radicals (radicali), indicating respectively the party's mainstream and its left wing. The party also included several organised factions. The social-democratic majority was loosely organised, while including several organised movements: the Labourites – Liberal Socialists and Sicily's Reformist Movement, both splinter groups of the Italian Socialist Party; Reformist Europe, a splinter group of the Democratic Union led by Giorgio Benvenuto (previously named Reformists for Europe); the Social Christians, which had emerged from the left wing of Christian Democracy; the Republican Left, from the left wing of the Italian Republican Party; and the Liberal Left, from the left wing of the Italian Liberal Party. A dissident group left the Labourites in order to launch Socialists and Europeans as a vehicle to oppose the party's merger with DL. On the party's right, the Liberal DS had a moderate Third Way or radical centrist political agenda and joined the party's majority in latter years.

Before the party's last congress in 2007, the left-wing opposition was led by the DS Left – Returning to win, a democratic-socialist grouping, with other smaller groups including DS Left – for Socialism and the Ecologist Left. Before that, some DS leading members, including Pietro Ingrao, Achille Occhetto, and Pietro Folena, had left the party in order to join the Communist Refoundation Party, which at its sixth congress held in January 2005 moved toward a more heterogeneous, non-sectarian, and strongly pacifist variety of leftism.

== Popular support ==
The electoral results of DS (PDS until 1998) in general (Chamber of Deputies) and European Parliament elections from 1992 to 2006 are shown in chart below. The result for the 2006 general election refers to the election for the Senate (the DS contested the election for the Chamber of Deputies in a joint list with the DL).

View source data.

The electoral results of the DS (PDS until 1998) in the 10 most populated regions of Italy are shown in the table below.

	1994 general	1995 regional	1996 general	1999 European	2000 regional	2001 general	2004 European	2005 regional	2006 general
Piedmont	16.7	21.7	16.9	13.7	17.7	15.9	with Ulivo	20.1	16.9
Lombardy	13.0	16.5	15.1	12.9	with Ulivo	11.7	with Ulivo	with Ulivo	12.4
Veneto	12.2	16.5	11.8	11.1	12.3	10.7	with Ulivo	with Ulivo	11.5
Emilia-Romagna	36.6	43.0	35.7	32.8	36.2	28.8	with Ulivo	with Ulivo	30.6
Tuscany	33.7	40.9	34.8	31.9	36.4	30.9	with Ulivo	with Ulivo	29.8
Lazio	23.3	27.2	23.5	18.4	20.0	17.3	with Ulivo	with Ulivo	19.2
Campania	19.7	19.5	20.0	13.8	14.2	14.3	with Ulivo	15.3	14.1
Apulia	19.9	22.1	22.1	14.1	15.7	12.9	with Ulivo	16.6	15.6
Calabria	22.2	22.2	21.0	16.4	14.3	17.9	with Ulivo	15.4	14.4
Sicily	16.5	14.1 (1996)	16.6	12.0	10.1 (2001)	10.3	with Ulivo	14.0 (2006)	11.4

== Electoral results ==
=== Italian Parliament ===
Chamber of Deputies
Election year	Votes	%	Seats	+/−	Leader
2001	6,151,154 (2nd)	16.6	137 / 630	–	Walter Veltroni
2006	with Ulivo	–	123 / 630	▼14	Piero Fassino

Senate of the Republic
Election year	Votes	%	Seats	+/−	Leader
2001	with Ulivo	–	64 / 315	–	Walter Veltroni
2006	5,977,347 (2nd)	17.5	62 / 315	▼2	Piero Fassino

=== European Parliament ===
European Parliament
Election year	Votes	%	Seats	+/−	Leader
1999	5,387,729 (2nd)	17.3	15 / 87	–	Walter Veltroni
2004	with Ulivo	–	12 / 78	▼3	Piero Fassino

== Symbols ==
1998

2004

== Leadership ==
- Secretary: Massimo D'Alema (1998), Walter Veltroni (1998–2001), Piero Fassino (2001–2007)
  - Coordinator: Marco Minniti (1998), Pietro Folena (1998–2001), Vannino Chiti (2001–2004), Vannino Chiti / Maurizio Migliavacca (2004–2006), Maurizio Migliavacca (2006–2007)
  - Organizational Secretary: Pietro Folena (1998), Franco Passuello (1998–2001), Maurizio Migliavacca (2001–2004), Marina Sereni (2004–2006), Andrea Orlando (2006–2007)
- President: Massimo D'Alema (2000–2007)
- Party Leader in the Chamber of Deputies: Fabio Mussi (1998–2001), Luciano Violante (2001–2006), Marina Sereni (deputy-leader of the Olive Tree's group, 2006–2007)
- Party Leader in the Senate: Gavino Angius (1998–2006), Anna Finocchiaro (leader of the Olive Tree's group, 2006–2007)
- Party Leader in the European Parliament: Renzo Imbeni (1998–1999), Pasqualina Napoletano (1999–2004), Nicola Zingaretti (2004–2006), Giovanni Pittella (2006–2009)
