= Communist Party of Italy (2014) =

Communist Party of Italy Partito Comunista d'Italia
- Secretary: Cesare Procaccini
- President: Manuela Palermi
- Founded: 11 December 2014
- Dissolved: 26 June 2016
- Preceded by: Party of Italian Communists
- Succeeded by: Italian Communist Party
- Headquarters: Piazza Augusto Imperatore 32, Rome
- Newspaper: La Rinascita della Sinistra
- Youth wing: FGCI
- Ideology: Communism
- Political position: Far-left
- European affiliation: Party of the European Left (observer)
- Colors: Red

Website
- comunisti-italiani.it

The Communist Party of Italy (Italian: Partito Comunista d'Italia, PCd'I) was a short-lived communist party in Italy which represented a transition period between the Party of Italian Communists (1998–2014) and the Italian Communist Party (2016–present).

== History ==
The PCdI, which took the name from the 1921–1926 Communist Party of Italy (PCd'I), emerged in 2014 from a transformation of the Party of Italian Communists (PdCI), a communist party launched by splinters of the Communist Refoundation Party (PRC) in 1998. Before becoming a tiny party, the PdCI was a party of government and controlled dozens of seats in the Parliament.

Cesare Procaccini, a metalworkers' trade unionist who had replaced Oliviero Diliberto as PdCI's leader in 2013, was the party's secretary since its foundation while Manuela Palermi, a former senator, its president.

In 2016, the PCdI became the Italian Communist Party (PCI), which took the name from the 1926–1991 PCd'I ninety years after the latter's foundation. PRC splinters and minor groups also joined the new party.

== Leadership ==
- Secretary: Cesare Procaccini (2014–2016)
  - Coordinator: Alessandro Pignatiello (2014–2016)
- President: Manuela Palermi (2014–2016)
- Honorary President: Antonino Cuffaro (2014–2016)
