= Italian Marxist–Leninist Party =

Political party in Italy

Italian Marxist–Leninist Party Partito Marxista-Leninista Italiano
- General Secretary: Giovanni Scuderi
- Founded: 9 April 1977; 49 years ago
- Split from: Communist Party of Italy (Marxist–Leninist)
- Headquarters: Via Antonio del Pollaiolo 172a, Florence
- Newspaper: Il Bolscevico
- Ideology: Communism Marxism–Leninism Anti-revisionism Maoism
- Political position: Far-left
- National affiliation: Popular Unity (since 2022)
- Colours: Red
- Anthem: "Il Sole Rosso" ("The Red Sun")

Website
- pmli.it

The Italian Marxist–Leninist Party (Italian: Partito Marxista–Leninista Italiano, PMLI) is a political party in Italy. Founded in Florence on 9 April 1977 as an anti-revisionist Communist party, the leading core of the PMLI began their political activity as they joined the Communist Party of Italy (Marxist–Leninist) (PCd'I (ml)) in 1967. The group broke away from the PCd'I (ml) in 1969 and formed the Marxist–Leninist Italian Bolshevik Communist Organization (Italian: Organizzazione Comunista Bolscevica Italiana marxista-leninista, OCBIml). In 1977, the OCBIml was transformed into the PMLI. The party's general secretary is Giovanni Scuderi. Its official newspaper is called Il Bolscevico (The Bolshevik). During its history, the PMLI has not taken part in any national, European, or local election.

The PMLI is opposed to bourgeois democracy and during political elections carries out pro-abstention propaganda. It is a Communist party loyal to the teachings of Karl Marx, Friedrich Engels, Vladimir Lenin, Joseph Stalin, and Mao Zedong. This movement strives for a proletarian revolution and the establishment of a socialist Italy. The PMLI believes that Maoism is the highest stage of the workers' movement. As a Soviet leader, Stalin is held in high regard within the party due to his construction of the first socialist country, the Soviet Union, and his encouragement of the creation of the other socialist countries of Eastern Europe that became the Eastern Bloc. Consequently, the PMLI refuses Trotskyism, believing it to be an extremist and anti-communist diversion from Marxism–Leninism. Furthermore, it views the 1936 Soviet Constitution as example of the existence of socialism, and considers China under Mao to have been the last socialist country.

== History ==
=== Background and establishment of the OCBIml and Il Bolscevico ===
The first founders of the PMLI, which the party describes as "the four pioneers", began their Marxist–Leninist militancy in 1967, when they joined the PCd'I (ml). They were Giovanni Scuderi, Mino Pasca, Nerina "Lucia" Paoletti, and Patrizia Pierattini. In 1969, one of the densest years of the Cultural Revolution in the People's Republic of China, they and other followers denounced the PCd'I (ml), of which they served as the Leninist wing, as a revisionist party judged to be the left-wing cover of the Italian Communist Party (PCI). On 14 December 1969, Scuderi, Pasca, Paoletti, and Pierattini, alongside the provincial committee of Florence, left the PCd'I (ml) and established the OCBIml. The next day, the OCBIml published the first issue of the official newspaper, a two-page monthly magazine named Il Bolscevico. In October 1972, the organ of the OCBIml came out in four pages. In February 1976, it became an 8-page fortnightly. It further expanded in March 1978 and April 1984 when it became an 8-page and 10-page weekly, respectively. In January 1986, after a decision of the party's third congress, it came out at 12 pages. By April 2004, it further expanded to 16 pages.

In the first issue of Il Bolscevico, which was dense of quotes of Karl Marx, Vladimir Lenin, Joseph Stalin, and Mao Zedong, the OCBIml wrote that "Chairman Mao has often said that 'without destruction there is not construction. The destruction is the criticism, the revolution. The destruction comes first, it of course brings the construction.' By the destruction of the PCd'I (ml) of Florence, the Marxist–Leninist Italian Bolshevik Communist Organization arose on completely Marxist–Leninist foundations. It seeks to build the revolutionary party that assumes Marxism–Leninism–Mao Zedong Thought as the theoretical foundation that leads its thought." After its founding, the OCBIml's goal was mainly to accumulate the forces to create a revolutionary party. To achieve its goal, the OCBIml immediately launched itself in the student and workers revolts of the 1960s and 1970s, carrying out an abstentionist propaganda and denouncing those who they term false communists and Marxists–Leninists, including the PCI, which the PMLI considers to have been a reformist party since what came to be known as the Salerno turning point of 1944.

The late 1960s and early 1970s were difficult years for the OCBIml, mainly for the lack of funds. About those years in the history of the party, Scuderi said: "When we began the struggle for the Party we've not a pen, nor a chair, nor a brush, nor headquarters. Subsequently we rented a foul building of Florence of four rooms inhabited by mouses, cockroaches, and spiders that we restored during the summer holidays of 1968. We removed the bread by our mouths to give a newspaper and a minimum of equipment to the Party and when we could we gave a contribution to the brother parties in worse situation of ours." In 1970, the OCBIml was officially recognized by the Chinese Communist Party and the Chinese embassy in Rome invited the leaders of the OCBIml to the official holidays of China, while the OCBIml sent some messages to the Chinese Communists regarding the 10th National Congress of the Chinese Communist Party in 1973. The OCBIml sent condolences when Zhou Enlai and Zhu De died. The OCBIml had a wreath near the corpse of Mao on 18 September 1976 when the funerals finished. Unlike the PCd'I (ml) and alongside the Communist Party of Italy (Marxist–Leninist) of Osvaldo Pesce, it was among the few Italian Marxist–Leninist groups that did not break with the new Chinese leadership of Hua Guofeng.

=== Establishment of the PMLI ===
After having gathered dozen of militants of Tuscany, Lombardy, Sicily, and Calabria, the OCBIml established the PMLI in 1977. From 9 April to 11 April 1977, it was held in Florence the founding congress of the PMLI. During this congress, the constitution, the programme, the symbol (black hammer and sickle and Mao's head), and the party anthems were adopted. Scuderi was unanimously acclaimed as general secretary, and has remained the party's general secretary since then. For the PMLI, the date of the founding congress ideally represents the beginning of a new phase for the Italian working class. The PMLI argues that the first phase (1882–1921) was dominated by reformism of the Italian Socialist Party, while the second phase was dominated by revisionism of the PCI and pursued by its heirs, such as the Democratic Party of the Left and the Party of Communist Refoundation, with the latter being defined as a "counter-revolutionary and anti-Marxist–Leninist operation", as well as the Party of Italian Communists and Marco Rizzo's Communist Party. The party argues that the third phase should be dominated by the Marxism–Leninism–Mao Zedong Thought with the development of a nationally based PMLI.

=== Political and organizational Long March ===
The PMLI had five congresses in 1977, 1982, 1985, 1998, and 2008, all of which were held in Florence, where the central party headquarters are located. Since its establishment, the PMLI began a complex political work; it wanted to gain more and more workers and students, and to pursue its abstaining electoral campaign. Through this work, new party centres were created, and the PMLI came to be present in almost every region of Italy; it is particularly rooted in the South. Many cells were created, among them J. Stalin (Forlì), Red Vesuvio (Naples), Mao Zedong (Milan), and Mao (Enna). The party's anthem is "Il Sole Rosso" ("The Red Sun"); the party also uses "The Internationale" and "Bandiera rossa" as anthems.

The first congress, which established the party, was held on 9–11 April 1977. The second congress was held on 6–8 November 1982, and its document was titled Avanti sulla via dell'Ottobre ("Forward on the October [Revolution] Road"). The third congress was held on 27–29 December 1985; the congress document was named Il socialismo è l'avvenire della classe operaia e dei lavoratori italiani ("Socialism Is the Future of the Working Class and Italian Workers"). The fourth congress was held on 26–28 December 1998, and its document was named Costruiamo un grande, forte e radicato PMLI per combattere la seconda repubblica neofascista, presidenzialista e federalista e realizzare l'Italia unita, rossa e socialista ("Let's Build a Large, Strong, and Rooted PMLI to Fight the Neo-Fascist, Presidentialist, and Federalist Second Republic and Create a United, Red, and Socialist Italy"). The party's fifth congress was held on 6–8 December 2008 under the name Avanti con forza e fiducia verso l'Italia unita, rossa e socialista ("Forward with Strength and Confidence Towards a United, Red, and Socialist Italy").

=== Popular Unity ===
On 1 July 2022, the PMLI, together with other far-left parties and organizations (Confederation of the Italian Left, Atheist Democracy, Inventing the Future, The Future City, Italian Communist Party, and CARC Party), became part of the Popular Unity coordination, with the aim of elaborating and implementing common and shared initiatives and proposals. Due to different views about the Russo-Ukrainian War, which the PMLI condemned as a Russian imperialist war, there was a break between the PMLI and the CARC party. The PMLI argued that this should not stop the aim of unity of anti-capitalist forces.

== Ideology ==
According to its statute, the PMLI is "the conscious and organized vanguard of the Italian proletariat, the political party of the working class, that leads the immediate and partial struggles as well as the general and long-term struggles of the entire class and Italy's broad people's masses, and carries the socialist revolution on to complete victory." The party subscribes to a communism that has its theoretical basis in what the PMLI calls Marxism–Leninism–Mao Zedong Thought. The party statute says: "The Party takes Marxism–Leninism–Mao Thought as the theoretical basis guiding its ideological, political, organizational and practical orientation." The PMLI also has a political programme, which is known as the party's action programme and is updated through the years, including the issue of climate change that for the party must be linked as part of class politics and in support of socialism, with almost six hundred policy proposals. As a Communist party, its political programme says: "The fundamental program of the Italian Marxist–Leninist Party is to lead the proletariat to the conquest of political power, overthrow the bourgeois dictatorship, establish the dictatorship of the proletariat and ensure the complete triumph of socialism over capitalism. The ultimate goal of the Party is the realization of communism."

As Marxist–Leninists, the PMLI cites Karl Marx, Friedrich Engels (Marxism), Vladimir Lenin (Leninism), Joseph Stalin (Marxism–Leninism), and Mao Zedong (Maoism), who are named "the five teachers of the international proletariat", as the party's ideological inspirations. The PMLI strives for a "united, red, and socialist Italy". Other party's ideological characteristics include anti-imperialism, anti-revisionism, proletarian internationalism, anti-racism, and anti-fascism, which the PMLI links to anti-capitalism; the party opposes xenophobia and anti-immigrant sentiment, seeing racism in divide and rule terms as "a tool in the hands of the bosses to divide the workers because a divided class is weak but a united class is strong and scary." The PMLI is critical of Third Way and degrowth theories. It also supports lowering the voting age to 16 for national elections and 14 for local elections. On social issues, it is supportive of gender equality and women's rights, including abortion rights and defence of the abortion law in Italy against anti-abortion movements, through Marxist feminist lens. It is also supportive of LGBT rights, including egalitarian marriage, surrogacy, and trans rights; the party opposes discrimination against LGBT people, and it is critical of those who see social rights as being in opposition to civil rights, citing examples of LGBT individuals, such as Dolce & Gabbana, opposing LGBT rights.

=== Political theories and positions ===
The PMLI is a Marxist–Leninist party that aims to establish the dictatorship of the proletariat in Italy, which is considered an intermediate stage for the realization of communist society. It draws inspiration from the ideals of Marx, Engels, Lenin, Stalin, and Mao. Following the model of the October Revolution of 1917 and the Chinese Communist Revolution, it aims at revolutionary action to overthrow the Italian government, which is defined as "capitalist, neo-fascist, presidentialist, federalist, interventionist, expression of the parties of the right and left of the regime", to create a "united, red, and socialist" Italy; to achieve this, the PMLI resolutely excludes any form of terrorism, and condemned the Red Brigades as a "provocateur and counter-revolutionary strategy". The PMLI proposes to the masses the creation of representative institutions of the masses supporting socialism, such as popular assemblies and popular committees, which are to be understood as a bottom-up alternative to representative institutions. The party opposed the second Berlusconi government's failed attempt to abolish the Article 18 of Italy's Workers' Statute of 1970 in 2002; when it was abolished in 2015 through the Jobs Act by the Renzi government, which the PMLI criticized and opposed for favouring businesses and upholding the precariat, the party supported its return.

On a historical-ideological level, the PMLI sees the Soviet Constitution of 1936 as entailing the development of socialism in the Soviet Union, and rejects Trotskyism, which is considered a bourgeois and anti-communist deviation, as well as revisions of Marxism, such as reformist socialism and social democracy, and those of Nikita Khrushchev, Leonid Brezhnev, Yuri Andropov, Konstantin Chernenko, and Mikhail Gorbachev, that of Deng Xiaoping and post-Mao China, which is defined by the PMLI as "a black capitalist and fascist dictatorship", and that of Italy by the PCI since the time of Antonio Gramsci, whose influence the PMLI argues is used by what it describes as revisionists and false communists. The party considers the October Revolution "a historical event that demonstrated that the proletariat is capable of conquering political power and building socialism." The PMLI judges negatively the figures of Fidel Castro and Che Guevara as non-Leninists, and does not consider Cuba and North Korea to be socialist countries. For the PMLI, there has been no authentically socialist country in the world since Mao's death. Being a supporter of Marxist–Leninist atheism, it is an atheist party; at the same time, citing Mao, anti-clerical and communist supporters are accepted as party sympathizers and can carry out propaganda for the party.

The PLMI generally does not take part to political elections. During elections, the PMLI carries out an abstentionist campaign but does not exclude in principle the use of representative institutions if it deems it appropriate for its own purposes. The party is critical of the European Union, which is defined as imperialist, and does not stand in its elections. Instead, it provides an indication of the vote in abrogation referendums and constitutional referendums, such as supporting the "No" side in the 2001 Italian constitutional referendum about the regions of Italy and federalism, the 2006 Italian constitutional referendum about Italy's transformation from a unitary state into a federal republic, the 2011 Fiat Mirafiori referendum about the compliance with the trade union agreement signed by the Italian Confederation of Trades Unions and the Italian Labour Union that was opposed by the Italian Federation of Metalworkers, the 2016 Italian constitutional referendum about the composition and powers of the Italian Parliament and the division of powers between the state, the regions, and administrative entities, the 2020 Italian constitutional referendum about the reduction of the size of the Italian Parliament, and the 2022 Italian referendum on the repeal of five articles or decrees relating to the functions of the Italian judicial system.

=== Foreign contacts and positions ===
The PMLI had close contacts with the Chinese Communist Party (CCP) until 1981, when the CCP repudied the Cultural Revolution, and denounced Deng Xiaoping's reform and opening up and broke the relationship; the party considers China under Mao to have been the last socialist country, and describes it as a capitalist state after Mao, and as fascist under Xi Jinping. The PMLI tried to have relations with the Party of Labour of Albania but attacked it after Enver Hoxha rejected Maoism. After 1975, the PMLI had a close relationship with the Communist Party of Kampuchea (CPK), which continued after the invasion of Democratic Kampuchea by Vietnam that led to the Cambodian–Vietnamese War; the party's last contact with the CPK is dated to 27 May 1981. After Pol Pot's arrest in 1997, the party denounced the Khmer Rouge's betrayal. The PMLI also supported the Iranian Revolution of 1979 as an anti-imperialist revolution, and a party leader visited Iran in 1992.

From 14 December 1969 to March 1983, the PMLI delegates met in Italy or abroad in an official form with representatives of parties that refer to Marxism–Leninism, mass organizations of these parties, or of socialist states of 22 countries. In 1993, the PMLI took part in an international seminar on Maoism organized by the Marxist–Leninist Party of Germany. Apart from the Marxist–Leninist Party of Germany, the PMLI has, or has had, relations with the Revolutionary Communist Party of Argentina, Marxist–Leninist Communist Party of Greece, the Communist Party of India (Marxist–Leninist) Liberation, the Marxist–Leninist Centre in Mexico, the Marxist–Leninist Party of Ukraine, the Communist Party (Marxist–Leninist) of Panama, the Swiss Party of Labour, and the Revolutionary Communist Party of Uruguay.

At the fifth plenary session of the party's central committee on 11 October 2015, the PMLI took a stance of backing the Islamic State of Iraq and the Levant (ISIL) against what it describes as the "holy imperialist alliance" fighting it, while maintaining that "between us and the Islamic state there is an unbridgeable abyss"; the PMLI also condemned terrorist attacks linked to ISIL in Europe and elsewhere. The party's position caused dismay among other communist forces, and the PMLI denounced that they were attacked in Rome and Naples during two demonstrations, one in solidarity with the Palestinian Intifada and the other against the NATO military exercise Trident Juncture. The party also supported the 2021 Taliban offensive on anti-imperialist grounds, while commenting that "there is an abyss between the PMLI and the ideology, strategy, program, methods of struggle, and anti-female policy of the Taliban".

About the Russian invasion of Ukraine, the PMLI took a pro-Ukraine line, which the party described as "support for the Ukrainian resistance against Russian imperialism", and condemned Vladimir Putin's comments about Ukraine, publishing a document from Lenin arguing from a pro-Ukraine, anti-Russian Tsarism position. The PMLI described imperialism as "the mortal enemy of all the peoples of the world". In response to charges of being pro-Atlanticist or NATO, the party wrote: "We are not Atlanticists, our more than fifty-year development demonstrates this, but we are firm supporters of the heroic Ukrainian Resistance fighting against the Russian imperialist aggressor." The PMLI supports a peace that is "true, just, lasting, and definitive [which] can only exist if the aggressor is driven back within its borders and Ukraine returns to being, among its thousand class contradictions, a free, independent, sovereign, and integral country. For this reason, before any negotiation, unless expressly requested by Ukraine, the entire progressive, pacifist world, which loves peace and brotherhood among peoples, cannot fail to make the withdrawal of Russian troops by its own borders."

From the beginning, the PMLI condemned Russia for its invasion and Putin, whom the party described as the new tsar who is heading a neo-Nazi army. In March 2022, the party was opposed to Italy providing weapons to Ukraine, citing Article 11 of the Italian constitution and their "Russia, USA, and NATO out from Ukraine! Free, independent, sovereign, and integral Ukraine!" position. On 24 April 2023, the party's political office wrote: "The PMLI was against sending weapons to Ukraine but faced with the growing butchery of the new Tsar Putin, and since Ukraine is preparing for the counter-offensive to expel the Russian invader and occupier from Donbass, it is no longer possible to support [the] do not send weapons to Ukraine [position]." In May 2023, the PMLI wrote: "Once the phase of the war had changed, which could be decisive for the final victory of Ukraine, the PMLI's position could not but dialectically change. We also had to counter the growing and dangerous initiatives of false pacifists such as Michele Santoro and Ugo Mattei aimed at making the Italian people share the positions of the Russian aggressor." In June 2023, the PMLI also supported the use of PNRR funds to send military aid to Ukraine. In response to objections from the party readership, the PMLI's political office resolution argued: "It is not the first time in history that Marxist–Leninists find themselves fighting a common battle together with imperialists. Just think of Stalin's USSR which in the Second World War allied itself organically with American, English, and other imperialists to defeat Nazi-fascism."

== Commemorations ==
Every year in January, the PMLI, through the Emilia-Romagna organization, organizes in Cavriago the commemoration of Lenin's death, with an official speech by the person responsible that is followed by a collective lunch. Every year in Florence, the PMLI holds a commemoration in memory of Mao, who died on 9 September 1976, in which party militants and sympathizers participate.

On 2 March 2003, the party was at the centre of various controversies following the desire to commemorate the fiftieth anniversary of Stalin's death. On 5 February 2003, Italo Bocchino, on behalf of the entire National Alliance parliamentary group, held a parliamentary question on the legality of the commemoration. The government could only say that it "does not go against the principles of our system". On the day of the commemoration, three counter-demonstrations organized by Forza Italia, National Alliance, and Forza Nuova took place in Florence. Subsequently, Pasca took part in the broadcast Otto e mezzo hosted by Giuliano Ferrara and attacked Communist Refoundation Party member Rina Gagliardi as Trotskyist.

== Il Bolscevico ==
Il Bolscevico is the PMLI's official weekly editorial body based in Florence. It was founded on 15 December 1969, three days after the Piazza Fontana bombing, and its establishment was inspired by the Cultural Revolution and the protests of 1968. From the first issues, Mao's portrait and quotes stood out on the front page of Il Bolshevico, and were later being moved next to the masthead. The paper publication was suspended on 18 September 2013.

Since September 2013, the paper is published regularly in digital form and is freely downloadable and printable. It displays many statistics, reports, and related graphs from statistical institutes and international socio-economic organizations. It also includes several columns, such as "Lettere" ("Letters"), "Diaologo con i lettori" ("Dialogue with Readers"), "Contributi" ("Contributions"), "Corrispondenze operaie" ("Workers' Correspondence"), "Corrispondenza delle masse" ("Corrispondence of the Masses"), and "Sbatti i signori del palazzo in 1ª pagina" ("Slam the Palace Lords on the 1st Page"). In March 2022, the Vatican invited Il Bolscevico to a public debate.

On foreign policy issues, the PMLI and Il Bolscevico took a pro-Ukraine, pro-Volodymyr Zelenskyy, and anti-Vladimir Putin position in the context of the Russo–Ukrainian War, against China and Xi Jinping, in favour of the 2021–2022 Iranian protests, and supportive of the Kurdish people and against Recep Tayyip Erdoğan's policies towards minorities in Turkey.

=== Proceedings ===
Since its founding, the paper was subjected to a number of proceedings. On 17 September 1970, Scuderi, then general secretary of the OCBIml and political director of Il Bolshevico, was tried by the court of Florence for having published the electoral position in the newspaper of the OCBIml entitled "Il potere politico nasce dalla canna del fucile" ("Political power grows out of the barrel of a gun."). The trial concluded in Italy's Supreme Court of Cassation on 29 March 1974 with the confirmation of the 10-month prison sentence with the suspension of probation imposed in the appeal trial of 12 December 1972 for the crime of "continued subversive and anti-national propaganda". On 17 December 1970, Scuderi was sentenced by Francesco Fleury, the then magistrate of Florence, to pay a fine of 40,000 lire for "violation of the provisions on continuous printing". Fleury also ordered the suspension of its publication because the law on the press prohibits the publication of periodicals that do not have as their director a registered journalist, forcing the magazine's masthead to be modified for over a year (between January 1970 and March 1971) the newspaper until it was published under the name Il Proletario (The Proletarian). For the same crime, Scuderi was sentenced to a fine of 15,000 lire by the Court of Florence on 14 April 1975.

In April 1972, Scuderi was indicted for "contempt against the head of state" in reference to the editorial of Il Bolshevico entitled "Un presidente, per chi e per che cosa (Leone)" ("A President, for Whom and for What (Leone)"). In this case, Italy's Minister of Justice, to whom the authorization is entitled, does not give authorization to proceed. On 14 June 1974, Scuderi was tried for having published the electoral document of the OCBIml in Il Bolshevico, which was titled "Abbandonate le illusioni parlamentari, il potere politico nasce dalla canna del fucile" ("Having Abandoned Parliamentary Illusions, Political Power Grows Out of the Barrel of a Gun"), and was sentenced to another 2 months of suspended prison, which were added to other convictions suffered in his capacity as general secretary of the OCBIml. The conviction became definitive on 9 May 1975 with the sentence issued by the Florence Court of Appeal, which brought together three criminal proceedings opened between February 1973 and April 1974 that concerned the documents "La strage di Milano ha fallito il suo scopo" ("The Milan Massacre Failed Its Purpose") and "Abbasso il governo clerico-fascista Andreotti" ("Down with the Clerical-Fascist Andreotti Government"). On 22 June 1974, another judicial communication was sent to Scuderi for an article entitled "La magistratura appoggia apertamente le misure fasciste del governo" ("The Judiciary Openly Supports the Government's Fascist Measures") with the accusation of "contempt against the judiciary".

On 27 October 1986, the Second Assize Court of Florence sentenced Scuderi and Pierattini, editor-in-chief of Il Bolscevico, to 8 months and 5 months and 10 days, respectively, for "instigating soldiers to disobey the laws". The indictment was related to the speech given by Scuderi to the central committee of the PMLI on 3 May 1986 and published in the No. 20 issue of 16 May 1986 in Il Bolscevico, in which "the imperialist policy of the then new leader Craxi against Libya" was denounced. On 4 November 1987, the sentence was reconfirmed on appeal. On 14 June 1988, the First Criminal Section of the Supreme Court of Cassation acquitted both defendants in full because "the fact does not exist". On 10 October 1987 and 5 January 1988, the investigating judge of Bologna and the Court of Appeal of Bologna issued sentences dismissing the criminal proceedings in the preliminary phase, which included the Pierattini as former editor-in-chief of Il Bolscevico and judge Domenico Gallo under investigation for the crime of "contempt of the judiciary" and "incitement to disobey the laws" in reference to a statement written by Gallo on the Scuderi–Il Bolshevico trial of 1986 and published on Il Bolscevico. Gino Paolo Latini, the then deputy general prosecutor of Bologna, appealed against both sentences; the appeal was definitively rejected by the Supreme Court of Cassation on 6 April 1988.

On 18 October 1990, criminal proceedings were opened against Scuderi and Pasca and Monica Martenghi, the political director and director of Il Bolshevico and the printer, respectively, on charges of "offending the prestige of the President of the Republic" in relation to the article "Fare piena luce sui rapporti Cossiga-P2" ("Shedding Full Light on the Cossiga–P2 Relations"). On 20 April 1991, the investigating judge accepted the request for a 6-month extension of the deadline for preliminary investigations made by the prosecutor. In November 1991, it was revelealed that the investigations concerned the editorial published on the party's paper on 29 March 1991 entitled "Attenti a Cossiga" ("Watch Out for Cossiga"). On 13 November 1991, the Second Criminal Section of Florence acquitted Scuderi, Pasca, and Martenghi and two other grassroots militants of the crime of "incitement to desertion and military disobedience" during the Gulf War regarding the slogan "Disertare, non sparare, rivoltarsi" ("Defect, Don't Shoot, Revolt") reported in the issues of 28 December 1990 and 25 January 1991 of Il Bolshevico, respectively, because "the fact does not exist". This sentence was fully reconfirmed on 10 November 1992 at second instance, with the replacement of the acquittal formula for Pasca and Scuderi "for not having committed the crime".

In November 2002, the PMLI denounced three articles by Dimitri Buffa for Libero, La Padania, and L'Opinione della libertà, in which he accused the party of having participated in a plot with Islamic fundamentalism and neo-Nazis to overthrow the leadership of the anti-globalization movement and cause disorder at the demonstration in Florence. In May 2007, the PMLI won a lawsuit it had brought against the newspapers Libero and La Padania, both of which had accused the PMLI of having relations with fundamentalist Islamic and Al-Qaeda organizations. The newspapers were sentenced to pay financial compensation to the PMLI for defamation.

== See also ==
- Marxism–Leninism–Maoism
- List of anti-revisionist groups

== Bibliography ==
- Archivio del Centro di documentazione di Lucca (1994). I periodici politici (in Italian). Florence: Regione Toscana.
- Baldoni, Adalberto; Provvisionato, Sandro (1989). La notte più lunga della repubblica. Sinistra e destra, ideologie, estremismi, lotta armata. 1968–1989 (in Italian). Rome: Serarcangeli.
- Brambilla, Michele (1994). Dieci anni di illusioni. Storia del Sessantotto (in Italian). Milan: Rizzoli. ISBN 88-17-84328-8.
- Casilio, Silvia (2005). Il cielo e caduto sulla terra! Politica e violenza politica nell'estrema sinistra in Italia, 1974–1978. Rome: Edizioni associate. ISBN 88-267-0402-3.
- Day, Alan John (2002). Directory of European Union Political Parties. London: Harper. p. 149. ISBN 0-9536278-6-1.
- Day, Alan John (2002). Political Parties of the World. London: Harper. p. 274. ISBN 0-9536278-7-X.
- Mangano, Attilio; Schina, Antonio (1998). Le culture del Sessantotto. Gli anni Sessanta, le riviste, il movimento (in Italian). Pistoia/Bolsena: CDP-Massari. ISBN 88-457-0117-4.
- Morandi, Sabina (2003). In movimento. Da Seattle a Firenze. Diario di una mobilitazione globale (in Italian). Rome: DeriveApprodi. ISBN 88-88738-04-5.
- Murialdi, Paolo (1976). "Storia della stampa italiana". In Castronovo, Valerio; Tranfaglia, Nicola (eds.). La stampa italiana del neocapitalismo (in Italian). Rome/Bari: Laterza.
- Negrello, Dolores (2000). A pugno chiuso. Il Partito comunista padovano dal biennio rosso alla stagione dei movimenti (in Italian). Milan: FrancoAngeli. ISBN 88-464-2146-9.
- Niccolai, Roberto (1998). Quando la Cina era vicina. La rivoluzione culturale e la sinistra extraparlamentare italiana negli anni 60 e 70 (in Italian). Pisa/Pistoia: BFS-CDP. ISBN 88-86389-37-X.
- Passare il segno: la forma della contestazione. Catalogo del Fondo '68-'77 della Biblioteca di via Senato (in Italian). Milan: Biblioteca di via Senato. 2008. ISBN 978-88-96040-07-2.
- Vettori, Giuseppe, ed. (1973). La sinistra extraparlamentare in Italia. Storia, documenti, analisi politica (in Italian). Rome: Newton Compton.
