= Armando Cossutta =

Italian communist politician (1926–2015)

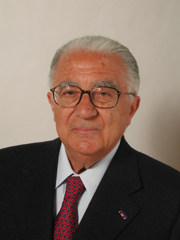

Member of the European Parliament
- In office 20 July 1999 – 19 July 2004
- Constituency: North-West Italy

President of the Party of Italian Communists
- In office 11 October 1998 – 21 June 2006
- Preceded by: Office established
- Succeeded by: Antonino Cuffaro

Secretary of the Party of Italian Communists
- In office 11 October 1998 – 29 April 2000
- Preceded by: Office established
- Succeeded by: Oliviero Diliberto

President of the Communist Refoundation Party
- In office 12 December 1991 – 11 October 1998
- Preceded by: Office established
- Succeeded by: Office disestablished

Member of the Chamber of Deputies
- In office 15 April 1994 – 27 April 2006
- Constituency: Tuscany (1994–1996); Campania 1 (1996–2001); Marche (2001–2006)

Member of the Senate of the Republic
- In office 28 April 2006 – 28 April 2008
- Constituency: Emilia-Romagna
- In office 25 May 1972 – 14 April 1994
- Constituency: Lombardy

Personal details
- Born: 2 September 1926 Milan, Italy
- Died: 14 December 2015 (aged 89) Rome, Italy
- Party: PCI (1943–1991); PRC (1991–1998); PdCI (1998–2007)
- Other political affiliations: GUE/NGL (1999–2004)
- Occupation: Journalist, politician

Armando Cossutta (2 September 1926 – 14 December 2015) was an Italian communist politician. After World War II, Cossutta became one of the leading members of the Italian Communist Party (PCI), representing the most pro-Soviet Union tendency; his belief in that country as the leading Communist state led him to criticize Enrico Berlinguer. Later in life, although he did not regret the choice he made, Cossutta considered that he was mistaken in opposing Berlinguer.

Opposed to Achille Occhetto's 1991 proposal to dissolve the PCI, Cossutta founded, together with Sergio Garavini, Nichi Vendola, and others, the Communist Refoundation Party (PRC), of which he became the president. When Fausto Bertinotti, the PRC leader, voted against a motion of confidence to the 1996 government of Romano Prodi, Cossutta opposed his stance, and left the PRC along with Oliviero Diliberto and others to found the Party of Italian Communists (PdCI). Afterwards, Cossutta was president of the PdCI and a member of the Italian Parliament. He also served as a member of the European Parliament during the Fifth European Parliament term (1999–2004).

Cossutta was targeted for decades by political opponents, including allegations that he personally received Soviet money and of being a KGB spy, both of which had been viewed with scepticism or were dismissed in two parliamentary commissions (one by the centre-right coalition in 2002, the other by the centre-left coalition in 2006) about the Mitrokhin Archive, one of the main sources of the allegations, which was also viewed with scepticism; a Supreme Court of Cassation ruling held that it was defamatory to refer to him as a Soviet spy, and awarded him damages. Cossutta never renounced communism. He never hid or regretted his role, and claimed its legitimacy in a bipolar world, in which all involved parties, from the United States to the Soviet Union, had their international lenders.

== Early life and World War II ==
Cossutta was born in Milan into a working-class family that was active in the political reality of the time. His father, originally from Trieste, took part in Gabriele D'Annunzio's takeover of Fiume. Cossutta joined the Italian Communist Party (PCI) in 1943, and took part in the Italian resistance movement as a partisan in the ranks of the Garibaldi Brigades. He was also arrested by the Nazi–fascists and detained for a certain period in the San Vittore Prison in Milan.

== Political career ==
=== Italian Communist Party ===
After World War II, Cossutta became part of the leadership group within the PCI, of which he embodied the more pro-Soviet current, which made him a privileged interlocutor of the Moscow nomenklatura, to which he was a highly esteemed ambassador for the PCI. His tendency to consider the Soviet Union as the leading state of the international Communist movement led him often and willingly to argue with Enrico Berlinguer, especially when the latter came to hold the position of general secretary. In the 1990s, he engaged with some self-criticism with those from the il manifesto group that he expelled from the party in 1969, and accepted some of their objections to his pro-Soviet views; in this sense, Cossutta's pro-Sovietism came from the fear that condemnation would have put an end to any possible alternatives to capitalism, and that rather than representing full support or praise of real socialism, it was a way to keep the party, while respecting liberal democracy, revolutionary and thus maintain the objective and possibility of a post-capitalist, socialist society. About the expulsion of il manifesto members, he said: "But with the rules of the party, expulsion was inevitable."

A collaborator of L'Unità and uninterruptedly a parliamentarian from 1972 to 2008 (first as a senator, then from 1994 to 2006 as a deputy, and then again as a senator), Cossutta held many political positions. He was city councilor in Milan since 1951; he was a municipal and then regional secretary of the PCI (in the first case in Milan, in the second in Lombardy), and was also a member from 1959 of the National Directorate and from 1964 of the National Secretariat. Cossutta's first assignment in the party had been that of city secretary of the PCI in Sesto San Giovanni when he was 19. The left wing of the party represented by Cossutta, named after him (cossuttiana), also consisted of various ex-workerist militants and he himself was close to the demands of their movement, even though he never detached himself from the PCI. He denied or diminished his own faction, and said: "Cossuttismo does not exist, and if it does exist it is only Togliattismo. It means one step after another, realizing the most advanced ideal aspirations in each step. And without unnecessary propaganda. In a word, the PCI. A great and unrepeatable reality. To be rethought, of course, in other forms.

About the 1956 invasion of Hungary, Cossutta recalled: "Of course, it was a tragedy and it was suffering for many, but Togliatti could not have taken a different position. There was the Iron Curtain and it was not we Communists who coined this expression, but Churchill. There was a balance of terror, a minor thing was enough to trigger a disaster." He added: "I was young then and as a Milanese member I shared the party line. The Hungarian Communists were the first to make mistakes." About Cuba and Castroism, Cossutta expressed his hope for a full-democratic system. At the same time, he praised Fidel Castro for the work he did under difficult conditions. He said: "But I don't forget that Castro himself did great things under dramatic conditions, like the 40-year embargo. In 1973 I spent a whole night with him, I brought him the flag of the Oltrepò Garibaldi Brigade as a gift, the one that captured Mussolini. Fidel stayed for hours asking me questions."

During the strategy of tensions and Years of Lead between the 1960s and 1980s, which saw attempted anti-communist, right-wing, or military coups like Piano Solo and Golpe Borghese, Cossutta wrote an editorial in Rinascita directed by Gerardo Chiaromonte, entitled "The Comrades Know", with which he meant to explain what should have happened in the event of a coup or subversion. In 2010, he recalled: "We had in mind the gravity and delicacy of the moment. Thus it was that we revived what had existed since the Liberation, i.e. the mythical 'order service' which had concrete tasks: to defend the headquarters, as the note from the secret services says, the houses of comrades, during demonstrations to avoid infiltrations. Our order service did not allow it."

In 1981, Cossutta opposed the Eurocommunist perspective promoted by Berlinguer, who had stated that the progressive driving force of the October Revolution had run out and that the PCI should have severed its historical relations with the Communist regimes of the Eastern Bloc. Apart from the merits, Cossutta criticized the method by which this political line was arrived at, which he defined as lo strappo (the tear), due to its gestation extraneous to internal discussions and the history of the party itself. Later, without regrets, Cossutta declared that he was wrong in going against Berlinguer. In discussing his never-repent attitude and Pietro Ingrao, he said: "I don't like this sprinkling one's head with ashes, crucify oneself, flogging those who, with hindsight, Pietro believes are their own mistakes and who also end up appearing to be mistakes of the PCI. Repentance has never been my vocation, I don't understand those who feel the need to repent of everything in order to question everything again." He added: "I've made mistakes too. I have many to reproach myself for, I too am ready to take the scourge, the ashes, the hair shirt, but if I think back to the great choices in my eyes they still appear right today."

=== Communist Refoundation Party ===
With the crisis that hit the PCI in the years of the riflusso (reflux), and the process of self-criticism that it undertook as a result, Cossutta distinguished himself within the internal debate as a firm supporter of the historical identity of the PCI, and thus opposed the more innovative tendencies who then moved under the secretariat of Achille Occhetto and that led to the dissolution of the PCI. The second motion, which was signed by Alessandro Natta and Ingrao, and also included supporters of Berlinguer, supported modernization but was opposed to renouncing Marxism, while the third motion, which was more orthodox and opposed the PCI's dissolution, was led by Cossutta and his supporters; those two motions later unified but were not enough to overcome the Occhetto-led first motion that garnered the majority.

In February 1991, with the establishment of the Democratic Party of the Left (PDS) and the effective dissolution of the PCI, to which Cossutta and a few other members like Sergio Garavini and Lucio Libertini were opposed, he founded, together with Garavini, Libertini, and other remnants of the old left-wing factions of the PCI, the Movement for the Communist Refoundation (MRC). In December 1991, the MRC was joined by Proletarian Democracy (PDUP) and other minor left-wing parties, and led to the establishment of the Communist Refoundation Party (PRC), of which Cossutta held the position of president from 1992 to 1998 and with which he was elected deputy in 1994. Following the 1996 Italian general election, in which he was re-elected a member of Italy's Chamber of Deputies, the PRC was part of the majority that supported the first Prodi government. As a deputy, he was a member of the Constitutional Affairs Commission (1994–2001), a member of the bicameral Commission for Institutional Reforms (1996–2001), the group leader of the Fourth Defense Commission (2001–2006), and a member of the Committee for Parliamentary Diplomacy (2001–2006).

=== Party of the Italian Communists ===
In 1998, Fausto Bertinotti, the then secretary of the PRC, withdrew confidence in Romano Prodi's government, and caused its subsequent crisis and fall. Cossutta, who disagreed with this choice and more generally with the political profile assumed by Bertinotti, decided to detach himself from the party and to found, together with other exiles close to his own area, such as Oliviero Diliberto and Marco Rizzo, the Party of Italian Communists (PdCI); it is recounted that Cossutta did so through a fax sent by Pro Loco di Bonassola, near La Spezia. The PdCI participated to the subsequent birth of the first D'Alema government. Cossutta then held the office of president of the PdCI and senator. About this, he said that he did it "in the interest of the country". In 2000, he participated, along with other politicians like Walter Veltroni, at the Gay Pride in Rome, where he took the opportunity to demonstrate his position in favour of same-sex marriage. Going back to the World War II years, as well as the fall of Prodi's government and the establishment of a new one led by Massimo D'Alema, he said: "I fought fascism, I determined the survival of a communist force after the end of the PCI, I served a split to save the first left-wing government in the history of Italy. And if after Prodi's fall we had gone to the polls, my party would have taken off and Bertinotti's would have almost disappeared. However, the right would have won and Berlusconi would have gone up to the Quirinale. Hence my sacrifice."

From 1999 to 2004, Cossutta was a member of the European Parliament. During his role as a member of the European Parliament, he was member of the Commission for Constitutional Affairs (21 July 1999 – 14 January 2002), member of the Delegation to the European Union–Russia Parliamentary Cooperation Committee (29 September 1999 – 14 January 2002), member of the Commission for Constitutional Affairs (17 January 2002 – 19 July 2004), and member of the Delegation for the Relations with Australia and New Zealand (7 July 2002 – 19 July 2004). He was also a substitute member of the Committee on Foreign Affairs, Human Rights, Common Security and Defense Policy (21 July 1999 – 14 January 2002) and of the Committee on Legal Affairs and the Internal Market (17 January 2002 – 19 July 2004).

In 2004, Cossutta published his autobiography entitled Una storia comunista (A Communist History). In the 2006 Italian general election, he was elected senator for the list Together with the Union, which the PdCI created for the election to the Senate of the Republic in the Emilia-Romagna region. During the second Prodi government, he was a member of the Third Commission for Foreign Affairs, Emigration, from 6 June 2006 to 28 April 2008; in his earlier senatorial terms, he held many parliamentary positions. In June 2006, opposed to the political line taken by Diliberto, Cossutta resigned from the position of president of the PdCI. On 21 April 2007, Cossutta presented his resignation from the membership of the party, as he no longer renewed his card, and effectively left active politics. Despite this, from time to time, he was seen in the Senate's restaurant. In 2008, he took side against what he described as the cultural revisionism that, in his view, was tended to obscure the anti-fascist resistance, the Italian Civil War, and the Liberation of Italy. He was also opposed to the naming of a street in Rome after the founder of the neo-fascist Italian Social Movement, Giorgio Almirante, whom he described as "a politician who was not simply a member of the First Republic but a partisan shooter and supporter of racism."

=== Later years ===
For the 2008 Italian general election, Cossutta said that he voted for the Democratic Party (PD). In 2009, asked by Fabrizio D'Esposito whether he was no longer a communist, Cossutta replied: "I was, am and will remain a communist." He expressed one regret to D'Esposito, namely the lack of communist representation, and that his vote for the PD did not change his views. He said: "And what should I regret? I was among the builders of a large party. Of course, we are small compared to the founders, to the generation of Palmiro Togliatti. I'm celebrating my 80th birthday, but at 19 I found myself secretary in Sesto San Giovanni where the PCI had 18,000 members in a huge concentration of workers." Among the leaders who guided the growth of the party, Cossutta named Giorgio Napolitano in Naples, Emanuele Macaluso in Palermo, Alfredo Reichlin in Rome, Ugo Pecchioli in Turin, and Guido Fanti in Bologna.

In 2009, Cossutta became vice-president of the National Association of Partisans of Italy (ANPI). Until his death in 2015, Cossutta remained a committed communist and faithful to the October Revolution. He said: "In Italy there are millions of communists who no longer feel represented. We have to shoot ourselves with this poor left." Despite political differences, Cossutta was one of the few parliamentarians and First Italian Republic figures, including Giulio Andreotti, who was respected by political opponents, who shook his hand and saluted respectfully.

== Post-Cold War allegations and controversies ==
In 1991, the Russian journalist Alexander Evlakhov, citing documents from the Communist Party of the Soviet Union, stated that Cossutta had received $824,000 from Russia for propaganda reasons during the 1980s. Cossutta dismissed these claims, saying that he had never received money from the Soviet Union. In 1999, Cossutta appeared on a list of alleged Italian KGB spies. In 2000, he sued Silvio Berlusconi, the then prime minister of Italy, for slander and defamation, asking for ₤100 billion in compensation. In a Porta a Porta broadcast, he had stated that "Cossutta managed armed gangs in the post-war years and had continued until a few years ago to keep an armed organization in Italy." He later retired the lawsuit after Berlusconi issued a statement of retraction and apology.

A parliamentary commission to investigate the allegations, among others, was instituted in 2002. Although it was led by the centre-right coalition majority, which instrumentalized it and used the contents of the Mitrokhin Archive, a collection of handwritten notes, primary sources, and official documents that were secretly made, smuggled, and hidden by the KGB archivist Vasili Mitrokhin, to attack its political opponents and delayed the final report, it was sceptical or dismissive of the claims; criticized as politically motivated, as it was focused mainly on allegations against opposition figures, it was shut down in 2006 without having developed any new concrete evidence beyond the original information in the Mitrokhin Archive. A subsequent parliamentary commission, this time led by the centre-left coalition, was established in 2006 to determinate whether the allegations were politically motivated. The 2006 parliamentary commission concluded: "Considering the British precautions that have been analyzed above, and which led to the elimination of many surnames and to making many events indecipherable and many characters unrecognizable, one can only speak, in the case of Cossutta – so clearly identified and accused, and moreover without the use of documents from the Mitrokhin Archive but on the basis of documentation, however distorted, of journalistic origin – of authentic persistence."

The main sources of the allegations were Evlakhov, Mitrokhin and Christopher Andrew, and Stephen Hellman, who based his claims on Evlakhov (who said that he never had the documents he was referring to but that he had seen them) and supported Occhetto's turn in 1989 and opposed Cossutta. According to the 2006 commission, the case of Cossutta was different from others because it was alleged that SISMI, Italy's secret service, engaged in a cover up; in fact, SISMI delivered news articles making the allegations to the British secret services, who were in the process of writing a book about it. All these newspapers, from Avanti!, La Padania, and Il Giornale, to Il Giorno and Il Tempo, were opposed to Cossutta and the centre-left government. In addition, there were many changes between the draft and Hellman's book, and in the footnotes, regarding Cossutta, who was variously referred to as "the Soviet loyalist on the Directorate" and "a KGB informant on the Directorate".

Especially during the years of the First Italian Republic, Cossutta had been accused of being a "confidential contact of the KGB" in Italy. Despite the conclusions of the 2002 and 2006 parliamentary commissions (Mitrokhin Commission), these allegations continued to be reiterated by some media even after his death. Il Tempo called him a "man of the KGB", and wrote that he traveled "frequently to the USSR to develop strategies against the deviationist drift" of Berlinguer. In November 2009, Cossutta was awarded €30,000 for moral damages as a result of the defamatory content of an article by Roberto D'Agostino, the founder of Dagospia, in which it was alleged that he was involved in the 1973 attempt on Berlinguer's life. In January 2015, the publisher of Libero in the legal entity Editoriale Libero s.r.l., the director Maurizio Belpietro, and the author of the 2003 article were definitively sentenced by Italy's Supreme Court of Cassation to compensate Cossutta to €50,000 for moral damages as a result of the defamatory content of an article in which the newspaper, "in relation to the so-called Mitrokhin case, identified him as a spy for the Soviet Union".

== Personal life and death ==
Cossutta was married to Emilia Clemente, with whom he had been linked for about seventy years and who died on 8 August 2015. Together, they had three children: Anna, Dario, and Maura, who was also active in politics as a parliamentarian. He died on 14 December 2015 at the San Camillo Hospital in Rome, where he had been hospitalized for some time, at the age of 89. He was buried in the PCI's resting place of the Campo Verano cemetery. In 2016, Milan's comune decided to inscribe his name, among fourteen other personalities, in the city pantheon inside Milan's Cimitero Monumentale. His nephew, Simon Cossutta, is a member of the PD, and in 2015 was part of Gianni Cuperlo's and left-wing opposition within the party to the then PD secretary Matteo Renzi.

Cossutta was an atheist. He was also a supporter of Inter Milan, and was one of the founders, alongside Ignazio La Russa and Roberto Zaccaria, of the Inter Club Montecitorio in the Italian Parliament. In 1998, he was imitated by Teo Teocoli during a broadcast of Quelli che il calcio. Cossutta appreciated the comedian's sketches and called him to congratulate him.

== Works ==
- I problemi del finanziamento del partito e la campagna per la stampa comunista. Rome: Iter. 1974.
- Il finanziamento pubblico dei partiti. Roma: Editori Riuniti. 1974.
- Decentramento e partecipazione. Iniziativa dei comunisti per l'attuazione della legge sui consigli di circoscrizione. With Marcello Stefanini and Renato Zangheri. Rome: Editori Riuniti. 1977.
- I comunisti nel governo locale. With Enrico Berlinguer. Rome: Editori Riuniti. 1978.
- Il modo nuovo di governare. Rome: Edizioni delle autonomie. 1980.
- Lo strappo. Usa, Urss, movimento operaio di fronte alla crisi internazionale. Milan: A. Mondadori. 1982.
- Dissenso e unità. Dibattito politico nel PCI dal XVI al XVII congresso. Milan: Teti. 1986.
- Vecchio e nuovo corso. Milan: Vangelista. 1988.
- Una storia comunista. With Gianni Montesano. Milan: Rizzoli. 2004. ISBN 88-17-00430-8.

== Electoral history ==
Election	House	Constituency	Party	Votes	Result
1972	Senate of the Republic	Lombardy – Vigevano	PCI	52,525	Elected
1976	Senate of the Republic	Lombardy – Vigevano	PCI	56,327	Elected
1979	Senate of the Republic	Lombardy – Vigevano	PCI	52,039	Elected
1983	Senate of the Republic	Lombardy – Vigevano	PCI	47,443	Elected
1987	Senate of the Republic	Lombardy – Vigevano	PCI	43,325	Elected
1992	Senate of the Republic	Lombardy – Vigevano	PRC	10,364	Elected
1994	Chamber of Deputies	Tuscany – Scandicci	PRC	46,997	Elected
1996	Chamber of Deputies	Campania 1	PRC	– (Note: Elected in a closed list proportional representation system.)	Elected
1999	European Parliament	North-West Italy	PdCI	13,432	Elected
2001	Chamber of Deputies	Marche – Urbino	PdCI	41,061	Elected
2006	Senate of the Republic	Emilia-Romagna	PdCI	–	Elected
