= List of anti-NATO parties and organizations =

Opposition to NATO tends to mainly come from pacifist organizations, workers movements, environmental groups and green parties, and socialist/communist political parties. Many of them believe NATO to be antithetical to global peace and stability, environmentally destructive, and an obstacle to nuclear disarmament. There are also libertarian and far-right political parties who oppose NATO, believing it to be antithetical to the ideals of limited government, non-interventionism and anti-globalization.

== Anti-NATO parties and organizations ==
=== International ===
- Global Women for Peace - United Against NATO
- International League of Peoples' Struggle
- No to NATO
- World Beyond War

=== Belgium ===
- Workers' Party of Belgium

=== Bulgaria ===
- Revival
- Attack

=== Canada ===
- The Canadian Network to Abolish Nuclear Weapons
- Voice of Women for Peace
- World BEYOND War Canada

=== Czech Republic ===
- Rally for the Republic – Republican Party of Czechoslovakia
- Workers' Party

=== Croatia ===
- The Key of Croatia
- Workers' Front

=== Denmark ===
- Red–Green Alliance

=== Finland ===
- Truth Party
- Kohti Vapautta!
- Blue-and-Black Movement
- Freedom Alliance

=== France ===
- Popular Republican Union
- La France Insoumise
- French Communist Party

=== Germany ===
- Die Heimat
- Die Linke
- Bündnis Sahra Wagenknecht

=== Greece ===
- Communist Party of Greece

=== Hungary ===
- Hungarian Workers' Party

=== Cyprus (non-member) ===
- Progressive Party of Working People

=== Iceland ===
- Left-Green Movement

=== Ireland (non-member) ===
- Sinn Féin
- People Before Profit
- Peace and Neutrality Alliance

=== Italy ===
- Partito Comunista
- Forza Nuova
- Italexit
- Italia Sovrana e Popolare
- Communist Party of Popular Unity
- Partito della Rifondazione Comunista
- CARC Party

=== Lithuania ===
- Lithuanian People's Party

=== Niger (non-member) ===
- M62 Movement

=== Poland ===
- National Revival of Poland

=== Portugal ===
- Left Bloc
- Portuguese Communist Party

=== Serbia (Non-member) ===
- Serbian Radical Party
- Serbian Party Oathkeepers
- Party of Radical Left

=== Slovakia ===
- Communist Party of Slovakia
- Kotleba – People's Party Our Slovakia
- Republic Movement

=== Slovenia ===
- Slovenian National Party
- The Left

=== Spain ===
- BNG - Galician Nationalist Bloc
- Chunta Aragonesista
- Communist Party of Spain
- EH Bildu
- Forward Andalusia
- General Confederation of Labour
- Spanish Catholic Movement
- United Left

=== Sweden ===
- Green Party
- Swedish Peace and Arbitration Society
- Left Party

=== Moldova (non-member) ===
- Party of Socialists of the Republic of Moldova

=== Montenegro ===
- New Serb Democracy

=== North Macedonia ===
- The Left

=== Norway ===
- Socialist Left Party

=== Russia (non-member) ===
- A Just Russia – For Truth
- Communist Party of the Russian Federation
- Liberal Democratic Party of Russia
- United Russia

=== Turkey ===
- Patriotic Party

=== United Kingdom ===
- Alba Party
- Campaign for Nuclear Disarmament
- Scottish Green Party
- Scottish Socialist Party
- Workers Party of Britain

=== United States ===
- The Future of Freedom Foundation
- American Communist Party
- CodePink

== See also ==
- 2006 anti-NATO protests in Feodosia
- Withdrawal from NATO
- 1949 anti-NATO riot in Iceland
- NATO debate in the Scottish National Party
