= Davide Caparini =

Italian politician and entrepreneur

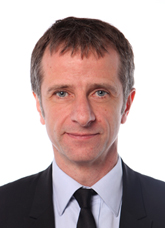
Davide Carlo Caparini

Davide Carlo Caparini (born 3 March 1967, Brescia) is an Italian politician and entrepreneur.

Born in Brescia on 3 March 1967, son of Teresina Gasparotti and Bruno Caparini, Davide Carlo Caparini lives in Vezza d'Oglio where he studied until high school. He graduated as mechanical technician at Technical Institute of Sondrio, where he got in touch with the movement Lega Lombarda for the first time in 1985.

He graduated as mechanical engineering at the University of Brescia and got a qualification in industrial design and one in site management and for laying heating cables at Pyrotenax of Canada in Toronto.

== Entrepreneurship and publishing ==
From 1995 to 1996 he was board chairman of the New Editorial S.P.A., editor of the L'Independente, managed by Daniele Vimercati that replaced Vittorio Feltri.

Caparini as CEO of Editoriale Nord scarl the in May 1997 founded "Radio Padania Libera" (edited until the spin-off of 2005), transforming the local Radio Varese in a national network. He edited the official Northern League house organ of Lega transforming it from the periodical "Lombardia Autonomista" to the national newspaper La Padania (on sale from January 1997 to November 2015) He founded the weekly publication "Sole delle Alpi" (on sale from 1998 to 2006) supervised by Roberto Poletti and by the publisher house "Bruno Salvadori".

Since 1999 to 2016 he was CEO of "Mediapadania srl", an advertising and dealership company which organizes events such as "Miss Padania" (from 1997 to 2013) and Celtic New Year.

Since 1999 to 2014 he was the CEO of "Celticon srl", publisher of "Telepadania", which was broadcast by Telecampione and Sky until its closure on 30 June 2014.

== Political activity ==
Davide Caparini is a member of Lega Lombarda since 1986, and he is activist of Lega Nord since 1989. He is the founder of the local branch of Vallecamonica, and in 1996 he has been elected to the Chamber of Deputies in the lists of Lega Nord. He is a member of many Parliamentary Committees including culture, transport, production, justice and defense. Since 2001 he has been the responsible for Lega Nord's communication and personally supervised election campaigns from 2006 to 2013.

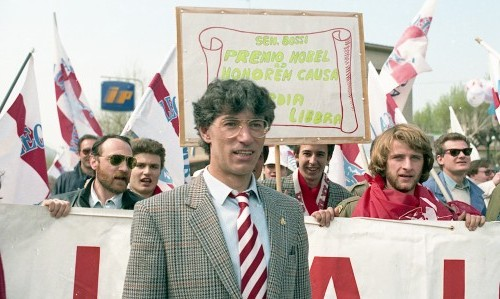

=== In Parliament ===
He was a member (XIII, XIV, XV and XVI Legislature), secretary (XVI Legislature) and vice president (XIV Legislature) of the Supervision Commission of the Rai.

In 2001 he prevented the sale of RaiWay in the attempt to pay off the huge losses of public licensee of the broadcasting service.

Caparini is a strong supporter of the abolition of the Rai Tax and he has set down many amendments, motions, orders of the day and legislative proposals for the liberalization of the television radio system and for the development of the local broadcasting sector. He has taken part in the drafting of the law of Par Condicio and of Gasparri's Law, about local broadcasting.

During the XIII Legislature he has been elected with 41.96% (36,701 votes) for Lega Nord.

It is the first signatory of 21 draft laws among which the most important ones are: the first about the abolition of the Rai Tax (which is always resubmitted), the one about the conflict of interest, about trade, retail and cost, about the local artistic heritage protection, about occupational safety, to promote employment and the purchase of small Electric power stations by municipalities.

During the XIV Legislature he has been elected with 52.89% (45,495 votes) for "Casa delle Libertà". He is the first signatory of 19 draft laws, among which the one about the voluntary associations, the one about the local broadcasting television, about par condicio, about the regionalization of public service broadcasting, and about the conservation and protection of the rock art.

Together with his friend Professor Ettore Adalberto Albertoni, Caparini has realized the program agreements for the promotion of the Roman Vallecamonica in Cividate Camuno and Bienno, for the enhancement of the historical center of Breno and its castle, for the Labor Museum in Cedegolo.

During the voting for the election of the Constitutional Court's judges, leaving the urn, as a protest, he showed a banner with the words " Papalia is a racist and Nazi", referring to Guido Papalia, the prosecutor of Verona, who pursued some members of Lega Nord for the offense of incitement to racism for having collected signatures against a gypsy camp.

During the XV Legislature, Caparini presented 28 draft laws, among which a new one about the abolition of the Rai Tax. One to face natural disasters, one for the citizenship test, one for the protection and promotion of minority languages, one for the adoption of the European Charter and regional historical ones, for historic cars and the abolition of the reserve kept for voluntary Italian military service.

During the XVI Legislature he has been chairman of the Parliamentary Committee on Regional Issues. He has done 48 draft laws; about the abolition of the Prefects, in favor of the money savers holders of Argentine bonds, in favor of the investigation of crimes of corruption, extortion, receiving stolen goods and laundering. About the establishment of social security benefits for employees who have to care with disabled people, for multimedia education in schools, about revocation of citizenship for foreigners who have committed dangerous crimes, for the transparency of financial statements of trade unions, about the decrease of the tax on real estates, for the rental market, for the deductibility of mortgage, in favor of the Alpine troops, for band activities and popular music, stadium security, in favor of the deported in the Nazi death camps and facilitated VAT for multimedia text, which has become law in the seventeenth Legislature.

During the seventeenth Legislature, Davide Carlo Caparini has become Secretary of the Presidency's Office of the Chamber of Deputies and member of the a Commission which deals with guarantees, rights and duties for the use of internet.

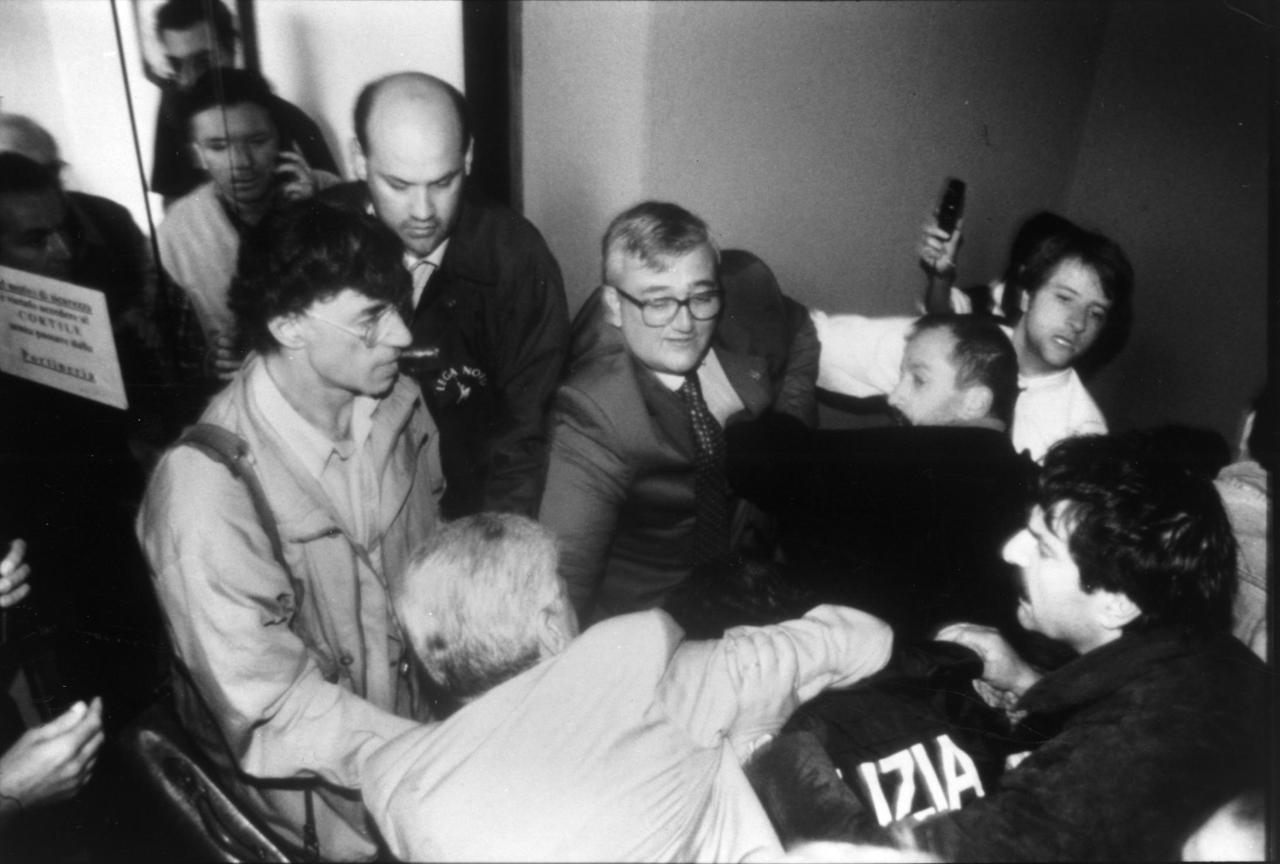
Irruption of Digos in Bellerio, headquarters of the Northern League in Milan on 18 September 1996. Davide Caparini with Umberto Bossi and Mario Borghezio resist the search of Roberto Maroni office.

=== Sebino viability ===
Caparini is the supporter of funding and conclusion of the new fast road called the SS 510 Sebina Orientale, whose work had been abandoned due to the failure of contractors. It has been opened in 2004. In July 1996, while the protests of citizens were becoming stronger, Caparini could find the missing 56 billion lire to finish the works. Due to Prodi's instability, the decree law allowing the award of the work was removed, and the legislative vacuum has been passed thanks to an amendment done by Caparini to the Finance Act 1997. The total amount was 100 billion lire and in October 1997, five years after the failure of contractors, the works could resume. In 1998 the lines between Marone and Vello (cost 81 billion lire) and between Bersaglio and Pilzone (cost 103 billion lire) have been completed but could not be opened to traffic because the central part of the track, the one above Sale Marasino, has not been completed. In December 1999 the Parliament with an order of the day made by Caparini, commits the Government to camuno-sebina viability. 35 billion lire miss, and the Lombardy Region allocates 24. In December 2000 several buildings in Pisogne have reported damage due to vibration and soil subsidence caused by excavation. The builder company must slow down the work. Due to limestone water infiltration, also the Pisogne variant suffers a delay. In November 1999, the citizens protest for the delay and the heavy rains in October and November 2000 worsen the situation. In May 2001, with more than four and a half years late, the Pisogne variant (Toline-Rovina) opens. The passage of the Tour of Italy leads to national public attention the danger of its galleries, which have been place of serious accidents too many times. The Minister of Public Works answers to a Caparini's Parliamentary question ensuring interventions in San Carlo and Santa Barbara galleries. The Province of Brescia works to make safe the Trentapassi Gallery and the consequent creation of an alternative road reassessing the lakefront. The Berlusconi II approves the new law about public works and allows the entrance of SS 510 in the list of strategic interventions of national importance. In 2003 many managers, entrepreneurs, officers and employees of the Milan compartment of Anas are arrested. This fact slows but does not stop the work. In February 2004 finally the Sebina Orientale road opens to traffic.

=== The Vallecamonica road ===
The situation of the viability in Vallecamonica and in Sebino, arrives in Parliament in 1996. In March 1998 the first inauguration: seven kilometers from the border between Lovere and Costa Volpino until Darfo Boario Terme. In 1999 Caparini presented the draft law about the completion of the road which links Valcamonica to the Province of Brescia and in 2000, the Parliament approved a Caparini's order of the day to finance and complete the work. In 2001 with the second Berlusconi Government, Caparini is able to unlock the latches work because of the discovery of a boulder with rock inscriptions at Badetto di Ceto and to fund some works on the SS 39 of Aprica. The stretch between Breno and Capodiponte opens. Together with the citizens' committee of Badetto di Ceto, Caparini found the resources to achieve the crossing of the town gallery in the average Vallecamonica then inaugurated in October 2005. With an amendment, Caparini puts "the completion of the Valcamonica system accessibility, S.S 42 – del Tonale e della Mendola "in the national strategy works, providing an additional funding of 150 million euro, which will enable the financing and the conclusion. In June 2007 as a sign of protest against the Prodi Government and its delay, Caparini engages in an ultramarathon "Less Prodi more roads", lasting 6½ hours along 62 kilometers that separate Iseo from Capodiponte. The last section of SS. 42 has been inaugurated and opened in December 2012.

=== The rules for the mountains ===
With the financial of 1999, Caparini manages to enter the facility on diesel fuel and LPG used in mountain areas. During the second Berlusconi government he has been working with the Minister for Regional Affairs Enrico La Loggia for the drafting of a new law for the mountain framework. In 2005 his project, made to facilitate the Italian mountain rescue (CNSAS) and the Alpine troops, becomes law. In this period he supports several local environmental committees in defense of Vallecamonica landscapes, getting the change of the route of the power line San Fiorano Gorlago and planting or dismantling of some high voltage lines. In 2006 he proposed the re-determination of water tariffs for the mountain communities as well as the increase in hydroelectric fees in favor of the inhabitants of the territories exploited by dealers. In 2006 he participated in the work for the preparation of a delegation to the Government for a code in favor of mountains and for bovine at high altitude.

=== Papalia and the via Bellerio facts ===
On 18 September 1996, just a few days after the Declaration of Independence of Padania on 15 September, the Digos frisked the offices of Via Bellerio (headquarters of Lega Nord) Umberto Bossi, Roberto Maroni, Davide Caparini and Mario Borghezio took position against the incursion. In Bellerio were seized some shirts, gadgets, and posters. Against the search warrant, the Chamber of Deputies walked appeal under Article 68 of the Constitution, which prohibits the violation of premises available to parliamentarians without consent of Parliament but Davide Caparini was condemned in 2004 by the Constitutional Court with a sentence of 6 months and 20 days.

== Other activities and social commitment ==
From 2006 to 2013 he has been vice president of Padania Sport, today Hercules Sports Athletics & Running Team, sports club affiliated with Sport Padania (sports promotion Team recognized by CONI) and with FIDAL. Long-time marathoner, member of the Montecitorio Running Club, Caparini runs today under the insignia of Smarathon Onlus (which raises money for spinal muscular atrophy research). He has raced all the major marathons (New York, Berlin, Chicago, Tokyo, London and, in 2013, the Boston marathon, marred by a bomb attack.) In the last few years he devoted himself to the practice of Triathlon. Rhythm guitarist and solo artist, self-taught, since 1994 he has been playing with a rock-blues group "Senso Unico", which has several times performed for charity alongside Omar Pedrini of Timoria.

== Gallery ==
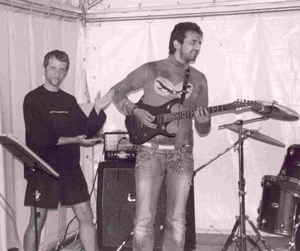
Davide Caparini and Omar Pedrini.

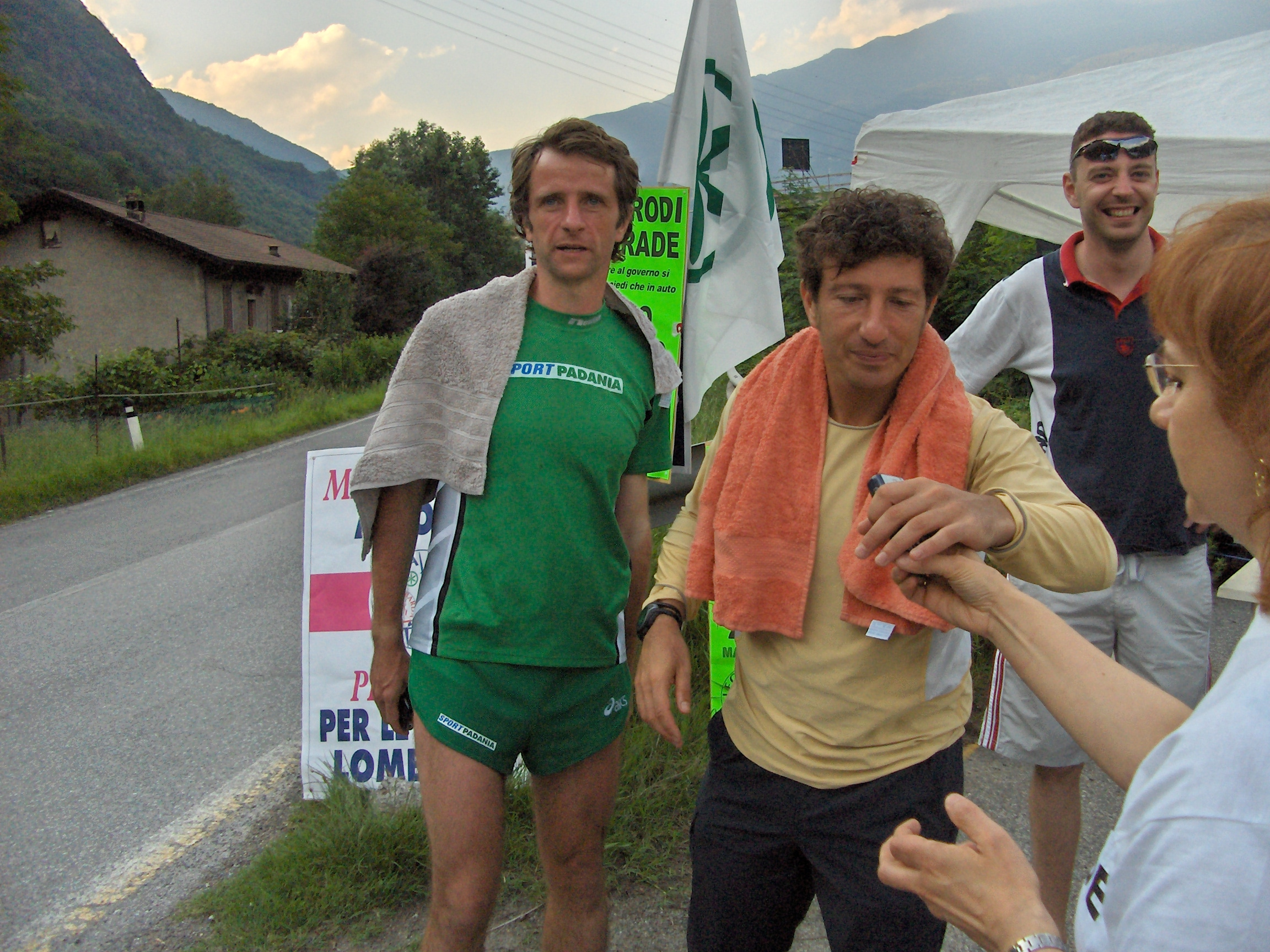
Caparini in Capo di Ponte at the "ultramarathon".

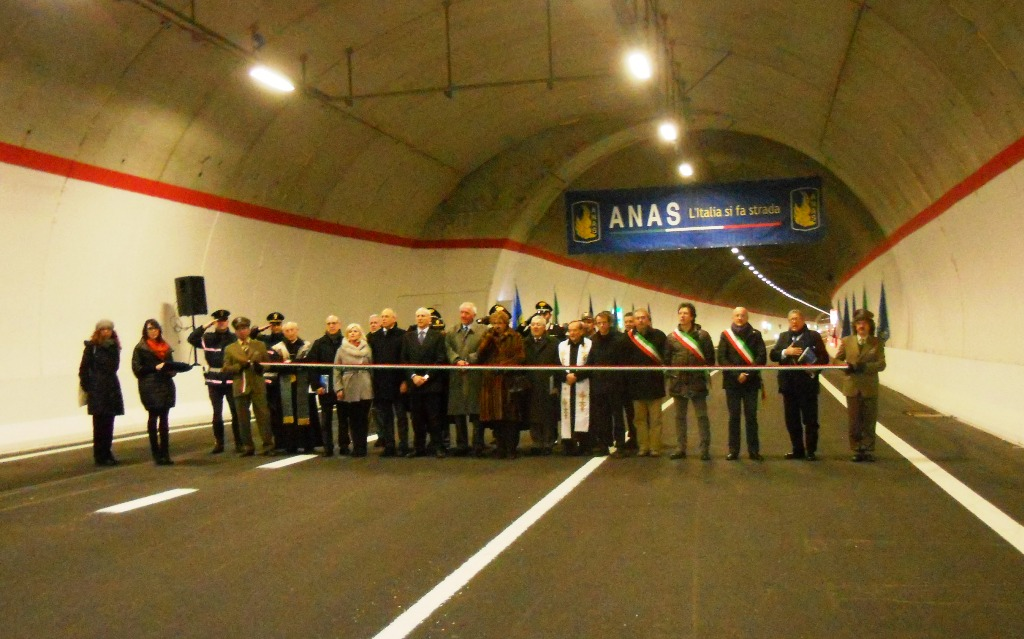
Opening of the Valcamonica road - SS42".
