= Ghedi (surname) =

Ghedi is a surname. Notable people with the surname include:

- Ali Mohammed Ghedi, Somali politician
- Enrico Ghedi (fl. 1985–2003), member of the former Italian rock group Timoria
- Kamara Ghedi, Romanian singer
