= Communist Party of Italy (Marxist–Leninist) =

Defunct political party in Italy

Communist Party of Italy (Marxist–Leninist) Partito Comunista d'Italia (marxista-leninista)
- Abbreviation: PCd'I (m-l)
- General Secretaries: Fosco Dinucci
- Founded: 14 October 1966
- Dissolved: 15 September 1991
- Split from: Italian Communist Party
- Merged into: Communist Refoundation Party
- Newspaper: Nuova Unità
- Youth wing: Union of Communist (Marxist–Leninist) Youth of Italy
- Ideology: Communism; Marxism–Leninism; Anti-revisionism
- Political position: Far-left
- Colours: Red

The Communist Party of Italy (Marxist–Leninist) (Partito Comunista d'Italia (marxista-leninista), PCd'I (m-l)) was a political party in Italy. It was at one time Italy's largest Maoist group, until it changed affiliation and sided with Albania.

== History ==
The party was founded in 1963 as the Italian Marxist–Leninist Movement. It was renamed Communist Party of Italy (Marxist–Leninist) in 1966. Its founders were from a group of Marxist–Leninist communists, who abandoned the Italian Communist Party led by Luigi Longo for its "revisionist" political line. The founders of the Communist Party of Italy (Marxist–Leninist) criticized and accused the PCI of "revisionism" (because the executives of Italian Communist Party accepted the thesis of Khrushchev that denigrated Stalin in the 20th Congress of the Communist Party of the Soviet Union) and to follow a parliamentarist and reformist political line. The secretary of the Communist Party of Italy (Marxist–Leninist) was Fosco Dinucci. Only persons who showed they knew the thought of Marx, Engels, Lenin, Stalin and Mao and who actively devoted themselves to the cause of the Proletarian Revolution, could join the party.

The Communist Party of Italy (Marxist–Leninist) declared its opposition to the parliamentary bourgeois democracy. For the revolutionary activists of the PCd'I (m-l), the only way was the revolution, the dictatorship of the proletariat, and to realize communism in Italy through the nationalization of the means of production and of exchange, and a planned economy.

In 1968, when the ideological clash between the Communist Party of the Soviet Union and the Chinese Communist Party (CCP) peaked, the PCd'I (m-l) was recognized as the representative of communism in Italy by the CCP and by the Party of Labour of Albania. Such recognition became official in August 1968. Osvaldo Pesce and Dino Dini made a delegation to Peking and met Mao and other important Chinese leaders. The meeting was immortalized in a photo published by the newspaper Nuova Unità, in which the two Italian representatives were seen together with the Chinese leaders.

In 1969 a radical faction (led by Giovanni Scuderi) broke away from the party and founded the Italian Marxist–Leninist Party.

In 1977, after the Sino-Albanian split, the party sided with Albania.

The party published a daily newspaper called Nuova Unità (New Unity) and a weekly called Vocce della Cella (Voice from the Cell).

In 1991, the PCd'I (m-l) joined the Communist Refoundation Party.
