= Cesare Procaccini =

Italian politician and metalworker

Cesare Procaccini (born 17 January 1953, in Matelica) is an Italian politician and metalworker; he is also the General Secretary of the Party of Italian Communists.

Procaccini was a member of the Communist Refoundation Party of Fausto Bertinotti since 1998, but in 2010 he passed to the Party of Italian Communists and after only three years he was appointed General Secretary of the party, taking the place of PdCI's historical leader Oliviero Diliberto.
