= Atheist Democracy =

Atheist Democracy Democrazia Atea
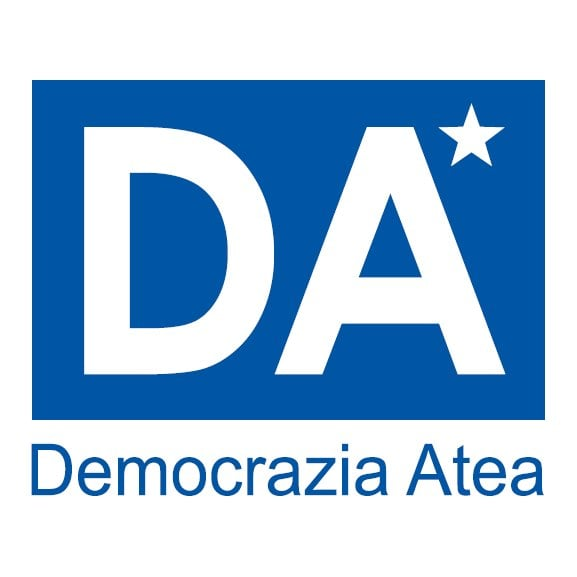
- Abbreviation: DA
- Secretary: Carla Corsetti
- Founded: 21 December 2009
- Dissolved: 26 April 2026
- Headquarters: Via Alfieri 80, Ceprano (FR)
- Ideology: Secularism; Anti-clericalism
- National affiliation: Power to the People! (2018); Popular Unity (2022–2023)

Website
- www.democrazia-atea.it

Atheist Democracy (Italian: Democrazia Atea, DA) was a political party in Italy. Its ideology included secularism, atheism, and anti-clericalism.

Among the main goals, it campaigned for the abolition of the Lateran Treaty between Italy and the Vatican City.

The party was founded by Carla Corsetti in 2009; Throughout its whole history, Corsetti has been the only secretary; other members of the secretariat have been Ciro Verrati, Ivan Visentini, Rosaria Gabriele, Cai Bravi.

The party required all candidates for public office to give proof of debaptism (sbattezzo in Italian). In Italy, many newborn receive baptism; debaptism is a formal procedure to declare oneself no longer part of the Catholic Church.

Famous astrophysicist and scientific communicator Margherita Hack was a member of Atheist Democracy; in 2013 she also ran unsuccessfully for the Italian parliament with the party.

Marco Dimitri also ran for office in 2013 with AD; being Satanist, his move drew some criticism.

In 2018, Atheist Democracy entered the Power to the People! coalition, also inserting the abolition of Lateran Treaty in the shared political program; this affiliation was interrupted in May 2021.

On 1 July 2022, Atheist Democracy, together with far-left parties and organizations (Confederation of the Italian Left, Inventing the Future, The Future City, Italian Communist Party, CARC Party and Italian Marxist-Leninist Party), became part of the "Popular Unity" coordination, with the aim of elaborating and implementing common and shared initiatives and proposals.

On 26 April 2026, via its official Facebook page, Atheist Democracy announced its dissolution and the adherence of its former members to the cultural association LaicItalia (Secular Italy), a move that became effective on 30 April 2026.

== Election results ==
=== Italian Parliament ===
Election	Leader	Chamber of Deputies				Senate of the Republic			
Election	Leader	Votes	%	Seats	+/–	Votes	%	Seats	+/–
2013	Carla Corsetti	556	0.00	0 / 630	New	Did not compete			
2018	Carla Corsetti	Into PaP		0 / 630	0	Into PaP		0 / 315	New

== See also ==
- Irreligion in Italy
