= Marco Dimitri =

Italian Satanist

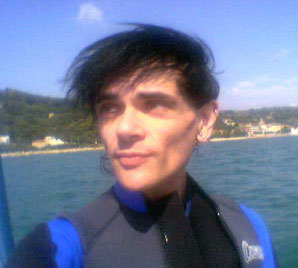
- Born: 13 February 1963; Bologna, Italy
- Died: 13 February 2021 (aged 58); Bologna, Italy
- Known for: President of Italian group "Bambini di Satana"; Democrazia Atea candidate for the Italian Parliament

Marco Dimitri (13 February 1963 – 13 February 2021) was an Italian Satanist and the president of the cultural association "Bambini di Satana" (BdS – "Children of Satan"). His interest in Satanism was seeded while he served in the military. In 1982 he became president of the cultural organization "Bambini di Satana," a group with more than 1,000 members.

Dimitri became known nationally when he participated in talk shows and various other programs. He expressed acrid criticism against the official Catholic culture in interviews with several newspapers, including Famiglia Cristiana. He was investigated on several occasions, and jailed for 14 months, but maintained his innocence and was exonerated.

== Early life ==
Born in Bologna, Italy, Dimitri became an orphan at the age of 14. Living on the streets he remained in school until graduation.

== Philosophy ==
Dimitri refuted any notion that his group are Devil worshippers, because "the cult of the Devil would be the cult of evil – but for us, good and evil are subjective to each individual". Satan, he asserts, is not about worshipping evil, rather it is a symbol of being an adversary, standing up to a repressive system. It is the church that is "repressive and forces man on his knees with laws that haven't been created by Christ but by man to enrich man".

== Court cases ==
In 1996 Dimitri was accused of raping a two-year-old boy and a teenage girl in Satanic rituals, a case which sparked intense media attention. After 14 months in prison he was exonerated of all charges.

Dimitri, together with fellow Bambini di Satana members Piergiorgio Bonora and Gennaro Luongo, were arrested on the charges of rape and fined for sexual assault, to which was later added violence against minors, violation of a tomb and desecration of a corpse. He rejected these allegations vigorously for more than a year while he was in police custody. In 1997 the court ruled that these incidents had never happened and acquitted Dimitri. Released from prison he continued his activities supported not only by Satanists but also by counterculturalists like the Luther Blissett Project as well as some writers and journalists.

In 2001 the acquittal was appealed by public prosecutor Lucia Musti, who had led the unsuccessful prosecution in 1996. Dimitri was again acquitted, again due to lack of supporting evidence. In 2005 he was awarded compensation for unjust detention with the sum of €100,000.

== Political activity ==
In August 2012 Dimitri joined the Italian reformist party Democrazia Atea (DA). The party, led by astrophysicist Margherita Hack, shares what were Dimitri's disestablishmentarian views. In February 2013 he became the DA's candidate from Roma's district Lazio 2 for the Italian Parliament, a move that generated much controversy and media coverage.

== Death ==
In February 2021, Dimitri died in his house from a heart attack, on the day of his 58th birthday.

== Tributes ==
In 2021, industrial rock band The Mark-Blessed dedicated to Dimitri a song titled Let the Children, recorded as a demo in 2010 and unreleased until his death.
