= CARC Party =

CARC Party Partito dei CARC
- General Secretary: Pietro Vangeli
- Founded: 21–22 November 1992
- Headquarters: Via Tanaro 7, Milan
- Ideology: Communism; Marxism–Leninism; Anti-revisionism; Maoism
- Political position: Far-left
- National affiliation: Popular Unity (2022–)
- International affiliation: World Anti-Imperialist Platform

Party flag

Website
- https://www.carc.it/

The CARC Party (Italian: Partito dei CARC) is an anti-revisionist Marxist–Leninist communist party in Italy. CARC is the acronym of "Comitati di Appoggio alla Resistenza per il Comunismo" (Committees to Support the Resistance for Communism).

== History ==
The CARCs were founded with a constitutive convention held in Viareggio on 21 and 22 November 1992 in which people who in the 70s had been part of Marxist-Leninist, pro-Chinese, autonomous and Trotskyist groups participated. The organization's first secretary general elected was Giuseppe Maj, who had been investigated for subversive association in 1981 and was then acquitted in 1986.

Present mainly in Campania and Tuscany, over the years the party ended up at the center of strong controversy regarding the links between itself and the subversive movements operating in Italy. A few months after its foundation, the organization stood on antagonistic positions with the aim of having a guiding role towards the proletariat, as established in the 1998 document entitled "Project of Manifesto – Program of the New Italian Communist Party". In 1999, the preparatory commission for the founding congress of the (new) Italian Communist Party was constituted; CARCs made public this event in its newly founded periodical La Voce del Partito Comunista, in which it was explicitly affirmed the necessity to constitute a clandestine organism in government of the legal organization. This form of coordination subsequently attracted the attention of the Ministry of the Interior, which placed the CARCs in the galaxy of left-wing subversion, contiguous to terrorist groups even if not directly involved in criminal actions.

The CARCs were weakened by two splits: the first one happened in 1997, when a group of militants left to create the LineaRossa group for the reconstruction of the Italian Communist Party; the second one two years later when the minority groups based in Padua, Foggia and Vicenza are accused by the majority of the national secretariat of "movementism and anarchist tendencies" and of deviation from the organizational line.

In 2001, the Popular Front list for the reconstitution of the Communist Party was presented to take part to that year's general elections. According to the secretary Pietro Vangeli, this operation was intended to bring together forces in the perspective of the reconstruction of the communist party. At the end of the same year, the investigation against Maj was closed.

In 2009, following the third Active Ideological Struggle, the CARCs became a party taking the name of the CARC Party.

At the 2011 municipal elections in Naples, the CARC party openly supported the former magistrate Luigi de Magistris, arousing several controversies.

During the third national congress held in October 2012, socialism was reaffirmed as the party's target, to be achieved through support to grassroots movements and a "People Bloc's Government" to counter the crisis.

In the 2013 parliamentary elections, the CARC party decided to take sides in favor of the Five Star Movement.

On 1 July 2022, the CARC Party, together with other far-left parties and organizations (Confederation of the Italian Left, Atheist Democracy, Inventing the Future, The Future City, Italian Communist Party and Italian Marxist-Leninist Party), became part of the "Popular Unity" coordination, with the aim of elaborating and implementing common and shared initiatives and proposals. Later that year they called Vita, PCI and Sovereign and Popular Italy to withdraw from the 2022 Italian general election to endorse the People's Union.

In January 2026, at the Cavour Congress Centre in Rome, CARC party branches voted to converge into the new, unified Communist Party of Popular Unity led by Fosco Giannini.

== Leadership ==
- Secretary: Giuseppe Maj (1992–1999), Pietro Vangeli (1999–present)

== See also ==
- List of anti-revisionist groups
