= Party of Italian Communists =

Party of Italian Communists Partito dei Comunisti Italiani
- Leaders: Armando Cossutta; Oliviero Diliberto; Cesare Procaccini
- Founder: Armando Cossutta
- Founded: 11 October 1998
- Dissolved: 11 December 2014
- Split from: Communist Refoundation Party
- Succeeded by: Communist Party of Italy
- Headquarters: Piazza Augusto Imperatore 32, Rome
- Newspaper: La Rinascita della Sinistra
- Youth wing: Youth Federation of Italian Communists
- Membership (2012): 12,500
- Ideology: Communism
- Political position: Far-left
- National affiliation: The Olive Tree (1998–2004); The Union (2004–2008); The Left – The Rainbow (2008); Anticapitalist and Communist List (2009); Federation of the Left (2009–2012); Civil Revolution (2013); The Other Europe (2014)
- European affiliation: Party of the European Left (observer)
- European Parliament group: GUE/NGL (1998–2009)
- International affiliation: IMCWP
- Colors: Red

Party flag

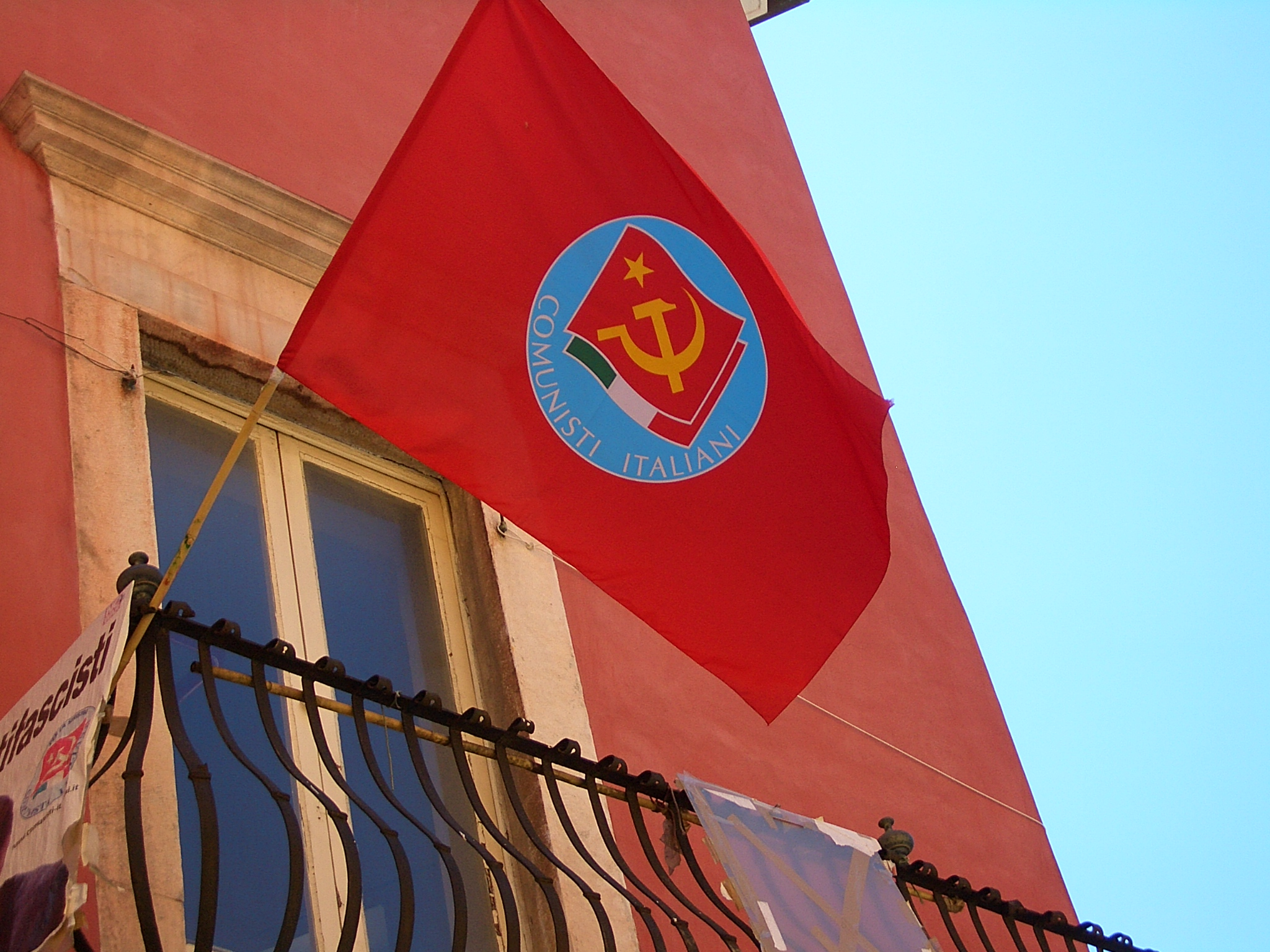
PdCI flag flown in Carrara (2007)

The Party of Italian Communists (Italian: Partito dei Comunisti Italiani, PdCI) was a communist party in Italy established in October 1998 by splinters from the Communist Refoundation Party (PRC). The split was led by Armando Cossutta, founder and early leader of the PRC, who opposed Fausto Bertinotti's leadership and, especially, his decision to withdraw support from Romano Prodi's first cabinet. In December 2014, the party was transformed into the Communist Party of Italy (PCd'I), which would later evolve into the new version of the Italian Communist Party (PCI).

== History ==
=== Foundation and early years ===
In October 1998, the PRC was divided between those who wanted to stop supporting Romano Prodi's first government, led by PRC secretary Fausto Bertinotti; and those who wanted to continue the alliance, led by PRC president Cossutta. The central committee endorsed Bertinotti's line, but Cossutta and his followers decided to support Prodi nonetheless. The votes of cossuttiani were not enough and the government lost a confidence vote in Parliament. The dissidents, who controlled the majority of deputies and senators, split and formed a rival communist outfit, the PdCI, which immediately joined the first cabinet led by Massimo D'Alema, leader of the Democrats of the Left and first post-communist to hold the job of Prime Minister of Italy. Under D'Alema, PdCI's Oliviero Diliberto served as Minister of Justice.

Despite the split of most of PRC's parliamentary representation, the PRC remained more popular than the PdCI with voters, both in the 1999 European Parliament election (4.3% to 2.0%) and the 2001 general election (5.0% to 1.7%).

=== Leadership of Diliberto ===
Diliberto, who had been elected secretary in 2000, led the PdCI to continue its participation in the centre-left coalition (known at the time as The Olive Tree) at the 2001 general election, which registered a victory by Silvio Berlusconi's centre-right House of Freedoms coalition. The PdCI obtained 1.7% of the vote and a handful of deputies and senators.

In the 2006 general election, the party was a member of the winning The Union coalition and won 2.4% of the vote and 16 deputies while the Together with the Union electoral list consisting of the PdCI, the Federation of the Greens and United Consumers won 11 senators. Subsequently, the PdCI entered Prodi's second government, which would last until January 2008.

In the meantime, Diliberto had become the undisputed leader of the party and since 2005 clashes between him and Cossutta became frequent. In 2006, the latter resigned from president and was replaced by Antonino Cuffaro. In 2007, Cossutta left the party altogether.

For the 2008 general election, the PdCI formed a joint list named Rainbow Left (SA) along with the PRC, the Greens and Democratic Left under Bertinotti's leadership. SA obtained a mere 3.1% (compared to 10.2% won by the constituent parties individually two years before) and no seats. In 2008, Diliberto was re-elected secretary and proposed to the PRC a re-unification of the two parties through a "communist constituent assembly".

=== Out of Parliament ===
In the run-up of the 2009 European Parliament election, the PdCI formed along with the PRC and minor groups the Anticapitalist and Communist List. The list got 3.4% of the vote and no MEPs. In April 2009, the list was transformed into the Federation of the Left, which would be disbanded by the end of 2012 and officially dissolved in 2015. In the 2013 general election, the PdCI ran within Civil Revolution along with the PRC, the Greens, Italy of Values and minor groups, gaining 2.2% of the vote and no seats. The PdCI did not contest the 2014 European Parliament election, withdrawing its early support for The Other Europe electoral list.

Before and after the 2009 European election, the PdCI lost its right- and left-wings, respectively. In February, Unite the Left, led by Katia Bellillo (a former minister) and Umberto Guidoni (an incumbent MEP), left the party in order to participate in the election with the Left and Freedom list and would eventually merge into Left Ecology Freedom. In June, Marco Rizzo (the other incumbent MEP and former Diliberto's number two) was expelled and would later form the hard-line Communist Party.

In July 2013, Diliberto stepped down from secretary after thirteen years and was replaced by Cesare Procaccini, a 65-year-old former metalworker from Marche.

=== Communist Party of Italy ===
In December 2014, the PdCI was transformed into Communist Party of Italy, taking the name of the late Communist Party of Italy.

== Election results ==
=== Italian Parliament ===
Chamber of Deputies
Election year	Votes	%	Seats	+/−	Leader
2001	620,859	1.7	10 / 630	–	Oliviero Diliberto
2006	884,127	2.3	16 / 630	▲6	Oliviero Diliberto
2008	into SA	–	0 / 630	▼16	Oliviero Diliberto
2013	into RC	–	0 / 630	–	Oliviero Diliberto

Senate of the Republic
Election year	Votes	%	Seats	+/−	Leader
2001	into Ulivo	–	2 / 315	–	Oliviero Diliberto
2006	into The Union	–	5 / 315	▲3	Oliviero Diliberto
2008	into SA	–	0 / 315	▼5	Oliviero Diliberto
2013	into RC	–	0 / 315	–	Oliviero Diliberto

=== European Parliament ===
European Parliament
Election year	Votes	%	Seats	+/−	Leader
1999	622,261 (12th)	2.0	2 / 87	–	Oliviero Diliberto
2004	787,613 (8th)	2.4	2 / 78	–	Oliviero Diliberto
2009	1,038,247 (6th) (Note: In a joint list with Communist Refoundation Party.)	3.4	0 / 72	▼2	Oliviero Diliberto
2014	Did not run	–	0 / 73	–	Cesare Procaccini

== Symbols ==
1998-1999

1999–2001

2001–2006

2006-2014

== Leadership ==
- Secretary: Armando Cossutta (1998–2000), Oliviero Diliberto (2000–2013), Cesare Procaccini (2013–2014)
  - Coordinator: Marco Rizzo (1998–2009), Orazio Licandro (2009–2013), Alessandro Pignatiello (2013–2014)
- President: Armando Cossutta (2000–2006), Antonino Cuffaro (2007–2013), Manuela Palermi (2013–2014)
- Honorary President: Antonino Cuffaro (2013–2014)
- Party Leader in the Chamber of Deputies: Oliviero Diliberto (1998), Tullio Grimaldi (1998–2001), Marco Rizzo (2001–2004), Pino Sgobio (2004–2008)
- Party Leader in the Senate: Luigi Marino (1998–2006), Manuela Palermi (leader of the PdCI-Green's group, 2006–2008)
- Party Leader in the European Parliament: Lucio Manisco (1998–2004), Marco Rizzo (2004–2009)
