= Antonino Cuffaro =

Italian politician (1932–2019)

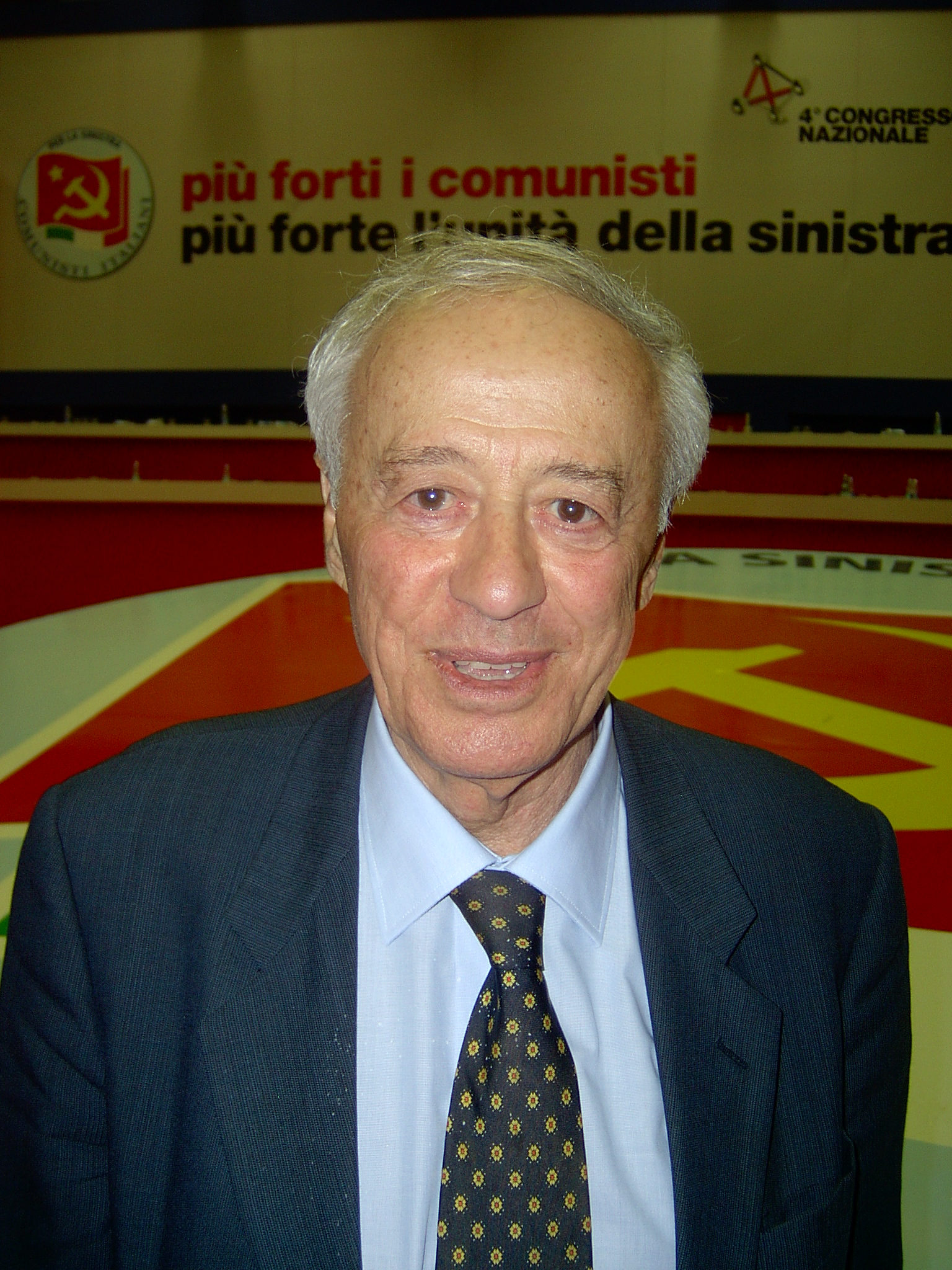

Member of the Senate
- In office 15 April 1994 – 8 May 1996

Member of the Chamber of Deputies
- In office 5 July 1976 – 1 July 1987

Personal details
- Born: 21 April 1932 Sambuca di Sicilia, Italy
- Died: 20 July 2019 (aged 87) Trieste, Italy
- Party: PCI (until 1991); PRC (1991–1998); PdCI (1998–2014)
- Profession: Politician, engineer, teacher

Antonino Cuffaro (21 April 1932, Sambuca di Sicilia – 20 July 2019, Trieste) was an Italian politician.

== Biography ==
Cuffaro was the son of Domenico Cuffaro, one of the founders of the Communist Party of Italy, leader of the Sicilian peasant and miners' movement and CGIL leader in the province of Agrigento.

After graduating in Naval and Mechanical Engineering with the highest grades, he moved to Aquileia, Friuli-Venezia Giulia. He assumed a chair of engineering at the "Alessandro Volta" Technical Institute in Trieste and worked as a consultant in the engineering field.

At that time, Cuffaro joined the Italian Communist Party, and in 1962, he was elected municipal councillor in Trieste. He was also elected regional councillor of Friuli-Venezia Giulia (1967–1976). In 1969, he joined the central committee of PCI, where he remained until 1991, the year of its dissolution.

He was Deputy for three legislatures from 1976 to 1987. From 1979 to 1988, he was also responsible for Scientific and Technological Research in the National Directorate of PCI. From 1977 to 1979, he took part in the work of the special chamber commission for the reconstruction of the areas of Friuli Venezia Giulia and the Veneto region affected by the 1976 earthquake.

Following the dissolution of PCI, Cuffaro joined the Communist Refoundation Party, and in 1993, he ran for the party's secretariat, being defeated by Fausto Bertinotti. From 1994 to 1996, he served as a Member of the Senate.

In 1998, Cuffaro left the PRC and joined the Party of Italian Communists. He served as Undersecretary for Scientific Research from 1998 to 2001, in the First and Second D'Alema Governments and in the Second Amato Cabinet.

On the occasion of the IV National Congress of PdCI, in 2007, he was unanimously elected President of the party, replacing Armando Cossutta. He remained the party's president until July 2013, when he was appointed Honorary President of the party.
