= Communist Party of Popular Unity =

Communist Party of Popular Unity Partito Comunista di Unità Popolare
- General Secretary: Fosco Giannini
- First Secretary: Salvatore Catello
- Headquarters: Rome
- Ideology: Communism; Marxism-Leninism; Euroscepticism, Anti-NATO; Anti-war
- International affiliation: Sovintern

Website
- https://movimentorinascitacomunista.com/

The Communist Party of Popular Unity (Italian: Partito Comunista di Unità Popolare, PCUP) is an Italian communist party founded at the party's first congress, held in Rome at the Cavour Congress Centre on 24–25 January 2026.

== Formation ==
The PCUP considers itself the political and ideological successor of the Italian Communist Party (1921–1991). The party aims to unite various groups in Italy to reconstitute what has become a fragmented communist movement. The preexisting groups Resistenza Popolare (Popular Resistance) and Movimento per la Rinascita Comunista (Movement for Communist Renewal) and other regional communist groups have converged into the new party.

== Leadership ==
The National Secretary of the Communist Party of Popular Unity (PCUP) is Fosco Giannini, former Senator of the Republic for the Communist Refoundation Party and, until the formation of the PCUP, coordinator of Movimento per la Rinascita Comunista (Movement for Communist Renewal).
