= Giovanni Scuderi =

Italian politician (born 1935)

Giovanni Scuderi (born 24 May 1935) is an Italian politician and general secretary of the Italian Marxist–Leninist Party (PMLI), which was established by him and others on 10 April 1977.

Giovanni Scuderi was born in Avola, Sicily, in 1935, in an Italy still marked by Fascism and war. He grew up during the postwar period and witnessed the profound social and political changes taking place across the country.

== Italian Marxist–Leninist Party ==
In 1969, Scuderi established the Marxist–Leninist Italian Bolshevik Communist Organization and Il Bolscevico (The Bolshevik). Inspired by the Cultural Revolution and the protests of 1968, the paper was founded three days after the Piazza Fontana bombing; he was the first to publicly define the bombing a strage di Stato (a massacre thought to be organized by organs of the state) as part of the strategy of tension in Italy. He was the newspaper's first political director and supported the unity of the Italian Maoists against the perceived revisionism of the PCI. In 1977, he established the PMLI in Florence and became its general secretary, a position that he maintained into the 2020s. During his political struggle, among the works he wrote is an essay for the International Seminary on Marxism–Leninism. His works are diffused in Italy, Mexico, and Ukraine. Scuderi lives in Florence, where the headquarters of the PMLI are located.

Scuderi considers the October Revolution "a historical event that demonstrated that the proletariat is capable of conquering political power and building socialism." Since the 1980s, former Italian partisan Enio Sardelli was close to the PMLI. In 1998, Scuderi wrote a tribute to Pol Pot upon his death. At the 5th Plenary Session of the 5th Party Central Committee, which was held in Florence on 11 October 2015, while condemning terrorist attacks, Scuderi affirmed his support for the Islamic State of Iraq and the Levant against the global forces of imperialism. He also supported the 2021 Taliban offensive on anti-imperialist grounds, while commenting that "there is an abyss between the PMLI and the ideology, strategy, program, methods of struggle, and anti-female policy of the Taliban". In 2022, he condemned the Russian invasion of Ukraine as imperialism, which he defines it as "the mortal enemy of all the peoples of the world", expressed support for the Ukrainian resistance, and described Vladimir Putin as the new tsar who is heading a neo-Nazi army. In March 2022, the Vatican invited Il Bolscevico to a public debate, which Scuderi accepted.

Party political offices
Preceded by None	Director of Il Bolscevico; 1969–1978	Succeeded by Mino Pasca
Preceded by None	General Secretary of the Italian Marxist-Leninist Party; 1977 – present	Succeeded by Incumbent
