= Dagospia =

Italian news website

- Type: Web publication
- Owner(s): Dagospia S.p.A. (95% Rocco D'Agostino, 5% Riccardo Panzetta, 2024)
- Editor: Roberto D'Agostino
- Deputy editor: Riccardo Panzetta
- Website: dagospia.com

Dagospia is an Italian web publication specializing in press review and behind-the-scenes coverage of politics, economics, society, and lifestyle. Founded and edited by Roberto D'Agostino, it has been active since 22 May 2000.

== Characteristics ==
Dagospia defines itself as an "online information resource with a generalist content that deals with behind-the-scenes stories." Although often considered a gossip website, D'Agostino has described it as "a news bulletin." The site averaged 12,000 daily visits in 2000 and 600,000 pages viewed in a single day in 2010. As of 2024, the site reported revenues of €2.6 million and a profit of €506,000. It is among the 50 most consulted news sites in Italy.

For some periods, the former President of Italy Francesco Cossiga was a source of information and behind-the-scenes stories for the site.

== Publications ==
- D'Agostino, Roberto; Pizzi, Umberto (2008). Cafonal. Gli "italioni" nel mirino di "Dagospia" [Tacky. The “Italions” in the crosshairs of “Dagospia”]. Segrate: Mondadori. ISBN 978-88-04-58623-4.
- D'Agostino, Roberto; Pizzi, Umberto (2010). UltraCafonal. Il peggio di "Dagospia" [UltraCafonal. The Worst of 'Dagospia']. Segrate: Mondadori. ISBN 978-88-04-60186-9.
