= Manuela Palermi =

Italian politician

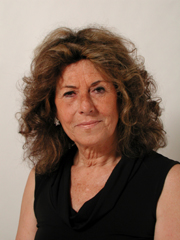

President of the Italian Communist Party
- In office 2016–2018
- Secretary: Mauro Alboresi
- Preceded by: Position established
- Succeeded by: Selene Prodi

Member of the Senate of the Republic
- In office 10 April 2006 – 28 April 2008
- Preceded by: Luigi Marino; Gianfranco Pagliarulo

Personal details
- Born: 26 November 1942 (age 83) Rome, Italy
- Party: PCI (until 1991); PRC (1991–1998); PdCI (1998–2016); PCI (since 2016)
- Profession: Politician, journalist

Manuela Palermi (born 26 November 1942 in Rome) is an Italian politician and journalist.

== Biography ==
After the dissolution of the Italian Communist Party (PCI) in 1991, Palermi joined the Communist Refoundation Party (PRC) and briefly edited the party's newspaper Liberazione. In 1998 she joined the Party of Italian Communists (PdCI), also becoming the editor of the newspaper La Rinascita della sinistra.

In the 2006 Italian general election she was elected to the Senate of the Republic on the Together with the Union list, while in the 2008 Italian general election she was a candidate for The Left – The Rainbow, but the list did not exceed the threshold and she wasn't re-elected.

In the 2013 Italian general election she stood for election to the Chamber of Deputies with Civil Revolution, but this list didn't exceed the threshold and she wasn't elected.

In 2013 she became the President of the PdCI's Central Committee. She remained in office even in 2016, after the transformation of the PdCI into the new Italian Communist Party.
