= Italian Communist Party (2016) =

Italian Communist Party Partito Comunista Italiano
- Secretary: Mauro Alboresi
- President: Cristina Cirillo
- Founded: 26 June 2016
- Preceded by: Communist Party of Italy
- Headquarters: Viale Mazzini 146, Rome
- Newspaper: Ragioni e Conflitti (online)
- Youth wing: Italian Communist Youth Federation
- Women's wing: Assemblea Nazionale delle Donne Comuniste – A. Do.C.
- Membership (2016): ▲c. 9–15,000
- Ideology: Communism; Euroscepticism
- Political position: Far-left
- National affiliation: Power to the People! (2018–2019)
- International affiliation: IMCWP; World Anti-Imperialist Platform
- Colours: Red

Party flag

Website
- ilpartitocomunistaitaliano.it

The Italian Communist Party (Italian: Partito Comunista Italiano, PCI) is a minor communist party in Italy.

== History ==
The PCI, which took the name from the historical and much larger Italian Communist Party, active from 1921 to 1991, emerged from the merger of the Communist Party of Italy (PCdI) with splinters from the Communist Refoundation Party (PRC) and minor groups in 2016. The foundation of the new PCI took place ninety years after the transformation of the old Communist Party of Italy into the old PCI.

After the founding congress, Mauro Alboresi was elected secretary by the party's newly formed national committee.

In the 2018 general election, the PCI was part of the Power to the People! electoral list, which obtained 1.1% of the vote and no seats. Soon after, the party left the list. In July the PCI held its first regular congress.

In July 2022 the PCI, along with other far-left parties and organisations (Confederation of the Italian Left, Atheist Democracy, Inventing the Future, The Future City, CARC Party and Italian Marxist–Leninist Party), formed the "Popular Unity" coordination, with the aim of elaborating and implementing common and shared initiatives and proposals. However, in the 2022 general election the PCI ran as a stand-alone list in 5 out 29 constituencies for the Chamber of Deputies and 7 out of 21 for the Senate, obtaining between 1.0 and 1.5% in Tuscany, Marche and Umbria.

In March 2025 the PCI held its third congress, during which Alboresi was re-elected secretary.

== Ideology and platform ==
The party declares itself faithful to the principles of Marxism–Leninism, anti-capitalism, anti-fascism, anti-imperialism and hard Euroscepticism.

In foreign policy, the party holds anti-American, anti-NATO, anti-Zionist, and Sinophilic views. The party is a part of the World Anti-Imperialist Platform. It has shown support for the Russian invasion of Ukraine and its use of the "Z" symbol and the ribbon of Saint George have caused scandal in Italy.

== Leadership ==
- Secretary: Mauro Alboresi (2016–present)
- President: Manuela Palermi (2016–2018), Selene Prodi (2018–2022), Cristina Cirillo (2022–present)
- Coordinator: Giacomo De Angelis (2018–2022)

== Election results ==
=== Italian Parliament ===
Election	Leader	Chamber of Deputies				Senate of the Republic				Government
Election	Leader	Votes	%	Seats	+/–	Votes	%	Seats	+/–	Government
2018	Mauro Alboresi	into Power to the People!		0 / 630	New	into Power to the People!		0 / 315	New	No seats
2018	Mauro Alboresi	into Power to the People!		0 / 630	New	into Power to the People!		0 / 315	New	No seats
2018	Mauro Alboresi	into Power to the People!		0 / 630	New	into Power to the People!		0 / 315	New	No seats
2022	Mauro Alboresi	24,555	0.09	0 / 400	0	70,961	0.26	0 / 200	0	No seats

=== Regional Councils ===
Region	Election year	Votes	%	Seats	+/−
Lazio	2023	10,212 (15th)	0.66	0 / 21	–
Umbria	2019	2,098 (14th)	0.50	0 / 21	–
