= Oliviero Diliberto =

Italian politician (born 1956)

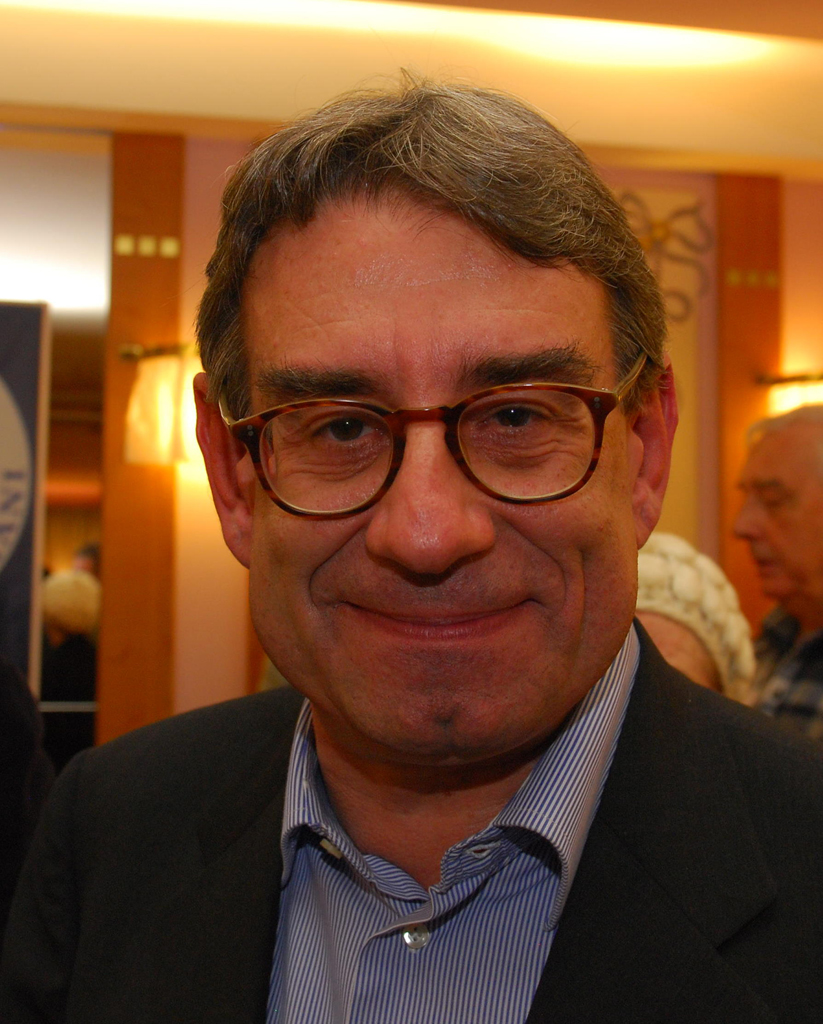

Minister of Justice
- In office 21 October 1998 – 26 April 2000
- Prime Minister: Massimo D'Alema
- Preceded by: Giovanni Maria Flick
- Succeeded by: Piero Fassino

Member of the Chamber of Deputies
- In office 15 April 1994 – 28 April 2008

Personal details
- Born: 13 October 1956 (age 69) Cagliari, Italy
- Party: PCI (1974–1991); PRC (1991–1998); PdCI (1998–2014)
- Education: University of Cagliari
- Profession: Academic, politician

Oliviero Diliberto (born 13 October 1956 in Cagliari) is an Italian politician. He has been leader of the Party of Italian Communists.

== Early life ==
Oliviero Diliberto was born in a family of public servants (his father Marco was employed as an attorney in the Administration of the Region of Sardinia, his mother Lella was a teacher). His youth was scarred by the untimely death of his father in 1971, after which he had to play a fatherly role for his younger siblings: his sister Ludovica, then eight years old, and his brother Alessio, who was born just two months before.

Diliberto became involved with politics in 1969 at age 13, when he was in high school. It was a time of turmoil in Italian schools, and young Oliviero quickly rose through the ranks of the student movement during his University studies. He eventually became Secretary of the FGCI (Federation of Young Italian Communists, the youth organisation of the PCI) for the province of Cagliari in 1978, the same year as his graduation.

Fascinated by the philosophical thought of Michel Foucault, after graduating from high school he travelled to Paris where, to support himself, he briefly worked at the city morgue, preparing corpses that had to undergo autopsy.

From 1978 to 1986 he earned scholarships to further his law studies in Frankfurt and in Rome, then worked as a researcher at the University of Cagliari, where later he would reach the post of Professor of Roman Law.

== Political career ==
A former member of the Italian Communist Party, Diliberto joined the Communist Refoundation Party after the breakup of his former party.

First elected as an MP in 1994 for the Communist Refoundation Party, Diliberto left his party in 1998 in contrast with the leadership's line about a motion of no confidence in which Romano Prodi was defeated. So Diliberto, together with Armando Cossutta and others, founded the Party of Italian Communists, of which he became the secretary. Diliberto then served as Minister of Justice in the first government of Massimo D'Alema, becoming one of the only two party members who were part of that government. He maintained the position until 2000, leaving voluntarily in the reshuffle, in order to concentrate on the party.

On taking office as Minister of Justice, he declared to the press his pride in being "The second Communist appointed as Minister of Justice after Palmiro Togliatti", and made a point of having the same desk previously used by the postwar Communist leader restored and placed in his office at the Ministry.

In November 2004 he was widely criticized for meeting with the leader of Hizbollah, Sheikh Hassan Nasrallah, during a visit to Lebanon. This prompted a protest note to the Italian Government from the Israeli Ambassador in Rome.

Before the April 2006 general election held in Italy (and won by the centre-left coalition), he declared he would not serve as minister in case of a centre-left win, and instead he would maintain his place as party leader, and so he has.

In May 2006 he was elected to the City Council of Rome. He is currently professor of Roman Law at the Faculty of Law of the "La Sapienza" University of Rome.

Before the April 2008 snap general election (caused by the fall of the Prodi II Cabinet), Diliberto refused candidacy to the Camera dei Deputati in the Turin constituency for the left-wing alliance The Left – The Rainbow, which his party was participating to, on grounds of giving a chance to be elected to a junior party fellow - a steel worker in the local Thyssen-Krupp steelworks, where a fire on 6 December 2007 had killed seven colleagues.

After the disastrous results of both the 2008 general elections and the 2009 European election, where the Italian left-wing parties failed to reach the minimum threshold, Diliberto was confirmed as party secretary, with a mandate to pursue unity of the left-wing parties.

== Family ==
Oliviero Diliberto has been married twice: in 1985 he married Ms. Delia Cardia, from whom he separated after some years. He is currently married (since 1997) to Ms. Gabriella Serrenti, with whom he met in 1978 at the university where he was an assistant lecturer.

== Electoral history ==
Elections	House	Constituency	Party	Votes	Result
1994	Chamber of Deputies	Iglesias	Communist Refoundation Party	28 170	Elected
1996	Chamber of Deputies	Scandiano	Communist Refoundation Party	54 368	Elected
2001	Chamber of Deputies	Scandiano	Party of Italian Communists	61 645	Elected
2006	Chamber of Deputies	Sicily	Party of Italian Communists	-	Elected
2013	Senate	Emilia-Romagna	Civil Revolution	-	Not elected

Political offices
Preceded by Giovanni Maria Flick	Italian Minister of Justice; 1998-2000	Succeeded by Piero Fassino
Assembly seats
Preceded by Title jointly held	Member of the Italian Chamber of Deputies; Legislatures; XII, XIII, XIV, XV; 1994 - present	Incumbent
Party political offices
Preceded by Armando Cossutta	Secretary of the Party of Italian Communists; 2000 - present	Incumbent
