= Timoria =

Italian band

Timoria (Italian pronunciation: [timoˈriːa]) were an Italian rock group, active between 1985 and 2003.

== Career ==
The group formed in Brescia in 1985 with the name Precious Time. In 1986 they adopted the name Timoria (Ancient Greek: τιμωρία, romanized: timōría, lit. 'vengeance') and took part at Discomusic, a festival organized by the newspaper Giornale di Brescia, winning the competition. After winning another festival, "Rock Targato Italia", they were put under contract by PolyGram and released their first single, "Signornò".

Produced by former CCCP - Fedeli alla linea member Gianni Moroccolo, in 1990 the band released their first album, Colori che esplodono, which was both a critical and commercial success. In 1991 they entered the Newcomers competition at the 41st edition of the Sanremo Music Festival with the song "L'uomo che ride", winning the Critics' Award.

In 1997, after the release of the album Eta Beta, following irreconcilable conflicts with the songwriter of the group Omar Pedrini, the lead singer Francesco Renga left the band and started a successful solo career, being replaced as lead singer by the same Pedrini and by newcomer Sasha Torrisi.

In 2002 the band came back to the Sanremo Music Festival, entering the main competition with the song "CasaMia". In 2003, following the release of the live album Timoria live: generazione senza vento, they announced a five-years hiatus which eventually resulted in the dissolution of the band, with Pedrini pursuing a solo career and Diego Galeri and Enrico Ghedi founding a new band, Miura. In 2017 Marimbo published its first American book of Enrico Ghedi: his poems are translated in English by the poet Jack Hirschman.

== Personnel ==
- Omar Pedrini – vocals, guitars
- Diego Galeri – drums
- Enrico Ghedi – keyboards, vocals
- Carlo Alberto 'Illorca' Pellegrini – bass guitar, vocals
- Pippo Ummarino – drums (from 1998)
- Sasha Torrisi – vocals, guitars (from 1998)
- Francesco Renga – vocals (1985–1998)
- Davide Cavallaro – bass guitar (1985–1988)
- Pietro Paolo Pettenadu – bass guitar (1985–1987)

== Discography ==
Albums

- 1986 – The Precious Time Demo (EP)
- 1988 – Macchine e dollari (EP)
- 1990 – Colori che esplodono
- 1991 – Ritmo e dolore
- 1992 – Storie per vivere
- 1993 – Viaggio senza vento
- 1995 – 2020 SpeedBall
- 1997 – Eta Beta
- 1999 – 1999
- 2001 – El Topo Grand Hotel
- 2002 – Un Aldo qualunque sul treno magico
- 2003 – Timoria live: generazione senza vento
