= La Padania =

la Padania
- Type: Daily newspaper
- Format: Tabloid
- Owner(s): Lega Nord
- Founded: 8 January 1997
- Political alignment: Pro-Lega Nord
- Language: Italian
- Ceased publication: 1 December 2014
- Headquarters: Milan, Italy
- Circulation: 60,000 (2009)

La Padania was an Italian daily newspaper, and the official press organ of the political party Lega Nord.

== History and profile ==
La Padania was the official newspaper of Northern League of Umberto Bossi founded in 1997 by Davide Caparini and directed by Gianluca Marchi (both coming from 'L'Indipendente' of Vittorio Feltri and Daniele Vimercati). It was delivered daily to newsstands and homes in Northern Italy since 8 January 1997. The paper was the official organ of the right-wing party Lega Nord.

The 2009 circulation of La Padania was 60,000 copies.

Due to financial difficulties, publication of the daily newspaper was suspended on 1 December 2014.
