= Pollastrini =

Pollastrini is an Italian surname. Notable people with the surname include:

- Barbara Pollastrini (born 1947), Italian politician and university professor
- Elettra Pollastrini (1908–1990), Italian politician
- Enrico Pollastrini (1817–1876), Italian painter
