= Katia Bellillo =

Italian politician

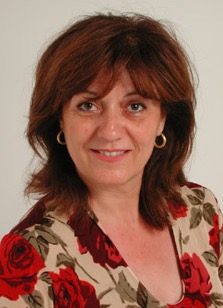

Minister for Equal Opportunities
- In office 26 April 2000 – 11 June 2001
- Prime Minister: Giuliano Amato
- Preceded by: Laura Balbo
- Succeeded by: Stefania Prestigiacomo

Minister for Regional Affairs
- In office 21 October 1998 – 26 April 2000
- Prime Minister: Massimo D'Alema
- Preceded by: Franco Bassanini
- Succeeded by: Agazio Loiero

Member of the Chamber of Deputies
- In office 30 May 2001 – 28 April 2008
- Constituency: Orvieto (2001–2006); Piedmont (2006–2008)

Personal details
- Born: 17 February 1951 (age 75) Foligno, Perugia, Italy
- Party: PRC (1996–1998); PdCI (1998–2008); US (2009–2010); SEL (2010)
- Education: University of Perugia
- Occupation: Politician

Katia Bellillo (born 17 February 1951) is an Italian politician and former minister. She served in governments under Massimo D'Alema and Giuliano Amato between 1998 and 2001. Originally a member of the Italian Communist Party (PCI), she joined the Party of Italian Communists (PDCI) in 1998 and became Minister for Regional Affairs. She later became Minister for Equal Opportunities in 2000, in which role she successfully championed a range of issues including LGBT rights and women's boxing. During the following year, she was physically and verbally attacked by Alessandra Mussolini during a live TV broadcast. After leaving government, in 2008, she was one of the founders of the Unite the Left movement and, after a long political hiatus, unsuccessfully ran for mayor of Perugia in 2019.

== Early career ==
Katia Bellillo was born in Foligno in Umbria on 17 February 1951. After graduating in education and social work, specializing in family mediation, from the University of Perugia, she was elected a regional councillor for Umbria from 1976. She served two terms as a member of the Italian Communist Party (PCI), and was raised to be vice president of the Regional Council. She later became a city councilor in Perugia where she was part of the Board of Directors of the local public transport company and a member of the Management Committee of the local health authority. She became vice president of the Provincial Council of Perugia and councilor with responsibility for wildlife planning, social services, education, culture, sports and leisure, equal opportunities. When the PCI dissolved in 1991, she joined the more radical Communist Refoundation Party (PRC).

== Role in government ==
In 1998 she participated in the internal split in the PRC, becoming part of the new Party of Italian Communists (PDCI). The new party joined the coalition led by the Democrats of the Left. Bellillo joined the first D'Alema government, serving in both the first and second governments as Minister for Regional Affairs. The end of the century saw upheaval in the government and after two crises in five months, Bellillo was given a new responsibility on 26 April 2000. Replacing Laura Balbo, she was appointed Minister for Equal Opportunities in the next Amato cabinet. In this role, she co-founded the Commission for Equalities and the Rights of Homosexuals, working with Balbo who had moved into an academic role at the University of Milan. Among other achievements, the Commission enabled homosexuals to become blood and organ donors for the first time. She also launched a national campaign to remove discrimination against female boxers and promote the sport of women's boxing.

== Later career ==
At the 2001 general election she was elected to the Chamber of Deputies in the single-member constituency of Orvieto. She joined the XIV European Affairs Commission and was the member of the PDCI National Secretariat responsible for the Department of Civil Rights.

During a Porta a Porta programme on sexual harassment broadcast in February 2001, Bellillo approached Alessandra Mussolini, the granddaughter of Benito Mussolini, and verbally accosted her. Mussolini responded by kicking Bellillo and calling her an "ugly communist". The furore did not harm either of their reputations.

In 2005, both Bellillo and actress Sabrina Ferilli supported the referendum on assisted fertilisation. Ferilli later told Gente that despite respecting the practice, she personally preferred adoption. Bellillo denounced her in an interview in Corriere della Sera and was unsuccessfully sued by Ferilli due to parliamentary immunity.

After the electoral defeat of The Left – The Rainbow coalition in the 2008 elections, she joined with Umberto Guidoni to found the Unite the Left movement. The movement, initially part of the PDCI, became independent and merged into Left Ecology Freedom (SEL) in 2010. Bellillo left the party shortly afterwards. In 2013, she joined the RadicalSocialist Movement association, becoming its national spokesperson. In 2019, she reentered politics and ran for mayor of Perugia. She was unsuccessful, receiving 1.77% of the vote.

== Electoral history ==
Election	House	Constituency	Party	Votes	Result
1975	Regional Council of Umbria	Perugia	PCI	3,537	Elected
1980	Regional Council of Umbria	Perugia	PCI	7,388	Elected
2001	Chamber of Deputies	Orvieto	PdCI	42,247	Elected
2006	Chamber of Deputies	Piedmont 1	PdCI	– (Note: Elected in a closed list proportional representation system.)	Elected
