= Minister for Equal Opportunities =

Position in the Italian government

The minister for equal opportunities (Italian: ministro per le pari opportunità) in Italy is one of the positions in the Italian government.

The current minister is Eugenia Roccella, who is serving in the government of Giorgia Meloni.

== List of ministers ==
Parties

- Democratic Party of the Left / Democrats of the Left
- Federation of the Greens
- Party of Italian Communists
- Forza Italia / The People of Freedom
- Democratic Party
- Italia Viva
- Brothers of Italy

Portrait	Name (Born–Died)	Term of office			Party	Government	Ref.
Portrait	Name (Born–Died)	Took office	Left office	Time in office	Party	Government	Ref.
Minister for Equal Opportunities
	Anna Finocchiaro (1955– )	18 May 1996	21 October 1998	2 years, 156 days	Democratic Party of the Left	Prodi I	
	Laura Balbo (1933–2026)	21 October 1998	26 April 2000	1 year, 188 days	Federation of the Greens	D'Alema I·II	
	Katia Bellillo (1951– )	26 April 2000	11 June 2001	1 year, 46 days	Party of Italian Communists	Amato II	
	Stefania Prestigiacomo (1966– )	23 June 2001	17 May 2006	4 years, 328 days	Forza Italia	Berlusconi II·III	
	Barbara Pollastrini (1947– )	17 May 2006	8 May 2008	1 year, 357 days	Democrats of the Left / Democratic Party	Prodi II	
	Mara Carfagna (1975– )	8 May 2008	16 November 2011	3 years, 192 days	The People of Freedom	Berlusconi IV	
Minister for Equal Opportunities, Sport and Youth Policies
	Josefa Idem (1964– )	28 April 2013	24 June 2013	57 days	Democratic Party	Letta	
Office not in use		2014–2019				Renzi; Gentiloni	
Office not in use		2014–2019				Conte	
Minister for Family and Equal Opportunities
	Elena Bonetti (1974–)	5 September 2019	14 January 2021	1 year, 131 days	Democratic Party / Italia Viva	Conte II	
	Giuseppe Conte (1964– ) As Prime Minister	14 January 2021	13 February 2021	30 days	Independent	Conte II	
	Elena Bonetti (1974–)	13 February 2021	22 October 2022	1 year, 251 days	Italia Viva	Draghi	
	Eugenia Roccella (1953– )	22 October 2022	Incumbent	3 years, 177 days	Brothers of Italy	Meloni	
