= Stefania Prestigiacomo =

Italian politician (born 1966)

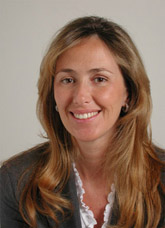

Minister for Environment and Protection of Land and Sea
- In office 8 May 2008 – 16 November 2011
- Prime Minister: Silvio Berlusconi
- Preceded by: Alfonso Pecoraro Scanio
- Succeeded by: Corrado Clini

Minister for Equal Opportunities
- In office 11 June 2001 – 17 May 2006
- Prime Minister: Silvio Berlusconi
- Preceded by: Katia Bellillo
- Succeeded by: Barbara Pollastrini

Member of the Chamber of Deputies
- In office 15 April 1994 – 13 October 2022
- Constituency: Sicily 2 (1994-1996; 2006-2022); Syracuse (1996-2006)

Personal details
- Born: 16 December 1966 (age 59) Syracuse, Sicily, Italy
- Party: Forza Italia (since 2013)
- Other political affiliations: Forza Italia (1994–2009); PdL (2009–2013)
- Education: Libera Università Maria Santissima Assunta
- Profession: Businesswoman, politician

Stefania Prestigiacomo (born 16 December 1966) is an Italian politician, member of the centre-right political party Forza Italia and Member of the Chamber of Deputies of Italy from 1994 to 2022.

== Biography ==
Stefania Prestigiacomo belongs to a family of Sicilian entrepreneurs. A former president of Region Sicily, Santi Nicita, is her uncle.

In 2006 she earned a First Level Degree in public administration at the Libera Università Maria SS. Assunta in Rome.

In 1990, she became the president of the Young Entrepreneurs Group of Syracuse, Sicily.

In 1994 she joined the Chamber of Deputies as member of the Forza Italia party. She was reelected in 1996, 2001, 2006, 2008.

In 2004, she was appointed as Minister for Equal Opportunities by Prime Minister Silvio Berlusconi. She was reappointed in that capacity in 2006. Between 2008 and 2011, she was Minister for Environment, Land and Sea.

Stefania Prestigiacomo has expressed support for the construction of new nuclear plants in Italy, a country with very limited reserves of fossil fuel and that currently imports (nuclear) electricity from France due to insufficient domestic capacity. She also authorized the drilling of off-shore oil wells in the Adriatic Sea in the proximity of Tremiti Islands, a natural maritime park.

She is President of the Inter-ministerial Coordination Committee for the fight against Paedophilia (CICLOPE). She is a Catholic.

== Honors ==
Commander of the Legion of Honor - 2016
