= Diritti e doveri delle persone stabilmente conviventi =

DiCo, an acronym for Diritti e doveri delle persone stabilmente conviventi (Rights and Duties for Stably Cohabiting People), refers to a bill presented to the Senate of Italian Parliament on 8 February 2007 by the Prodi II Cabinet, concerning a number of rights for heterosexual and homosexual cohabiting couples. The proposal falls short of the civil unions introduced in several other European countries in recent years.

The main goal of the DiCo bill was to give cohabiting partners, irrespective of their sexual orientation, inheritance and alimony rights (after nine and three years of living together, respectively). It would also allow one partner to make decisions on funeral arrangements and organ donation when the other dies. According to the law proposal, partners would have to go to the registry office to declare their de facto union, but no ceremony akin to marriage would be celebrated. In fact, the partners do not even need to register the union at the same time.

The text of the bill has been mainly composed by the legal staffs of two ministers of Prodi's cabinet, Barbara Pollastrini, Minister for Equal Opportunities and (at that time) member of the Democrats of the Left party (now member of the Democratic Party), and Rosy Bindi, Minister for Family and former Christian Democracy, at that time member of the Daisy, (now member of the Democratic Party), too.

The examination of the law was stopped during the same cabinet.

== See also ==
- Recognition of same-sex unions in Italy
- Domestic partnership
