= Anna Finocchiaro =

Italian politician (born 1955)

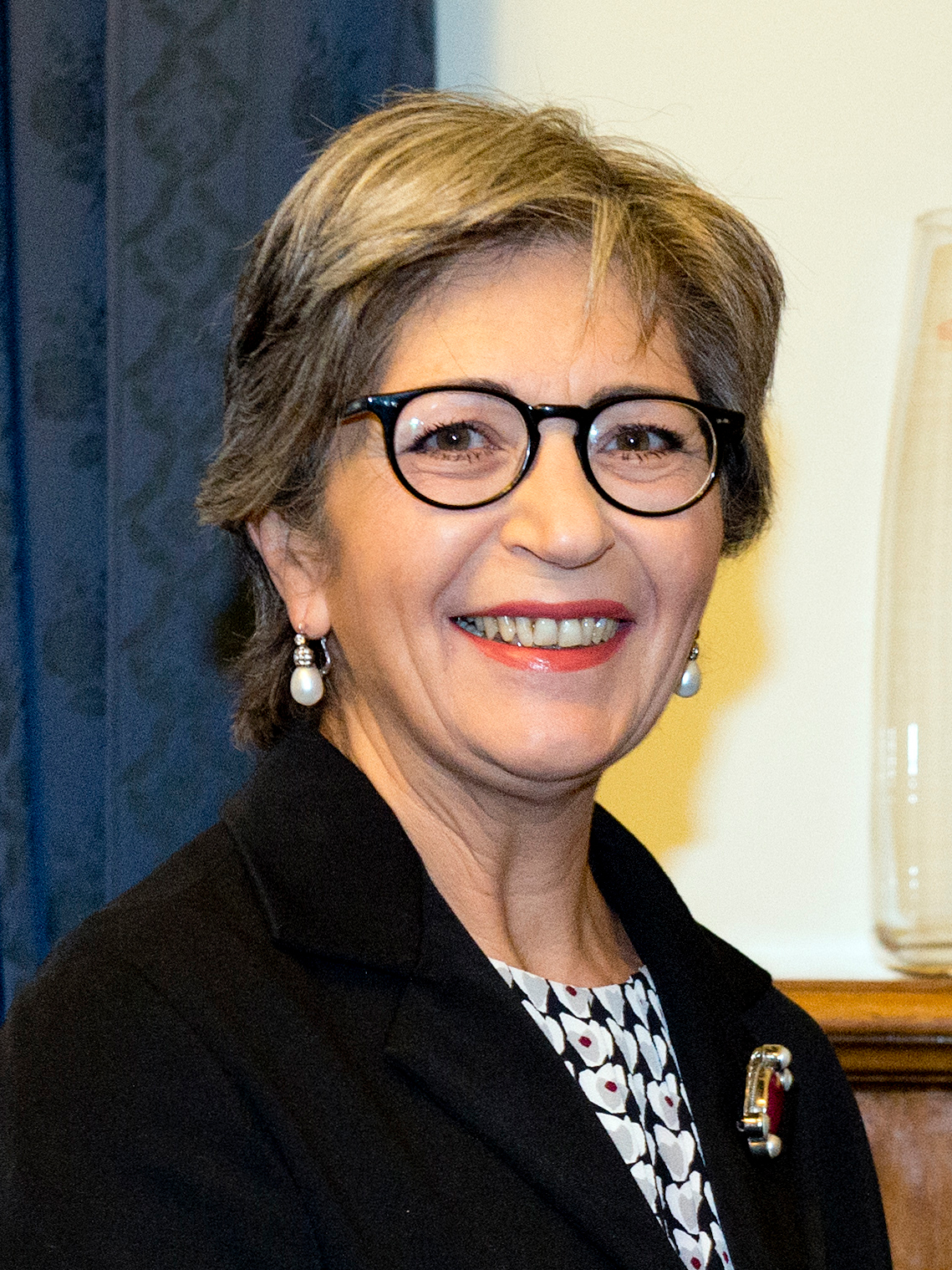

Minister for Parliamentary Relations
- In office 12 December 2016 – 1 June 2018
- Prime Minister: Paolo Gentiloni
- Preceded by: Maria Elena Boschi
- Succeeded by: Riccardo Fraccaro

Minister for Equal Opportunities
- In office 17 May 1996 – 21 October 1998
- Prime Minister: Romano Prodi
- Preceded by: Position established
- Succeeded by: Laura Balbo

Member of the Senate
- In office 28 April 2006 – 22 March 2018
- Constituency: Sicily (2006–2008); Emilia-Romagna (2008–2013); Apulia (2013–2018)

Member of the Chamber of Deputies
- In office 2 July 1987 – 27 April 2006
- Constituency: Sicily

Personal details
- Born: 31 March 1955 (age 71) Modica, Italy
- Party: PCI (before 1991); PDS (1991–1998); DS (1998–2007); PD (since 2007)

Anna Finocchiaro Fidelbo (Italian pronunciation: [ˈanna finokˈkjaːro]; born 31 March 1955) is an Italian politician. She was the Democratic Party's leader in the Senate from 2007 to 2013. She served as Minister for Equal Opportunities in the cabinet of Romano Prodi from 1996 to 1998.

== Biography ==
Born in Modica, Finocchiaro graduated in law in 1978, and she worked for the Banca d'Italia's branch in Savona before becoming a magistrate in Leonforte in 1982. She served as a magistrate until 1985, when she was appointed as a deputy public prosecutor at the court of Catania. She was first elected to the Chamber of Deputies as a member of the Italian Communist Party in 1987; she was elected to Catania's council in 1988. Finocchiaro was later a member of both the Democratic Party of the Left and the Democrats of the Left, and she was a founding member of the Democratic Party (PD) in 2007.

Finocchiaro served as Minister for Equal Opportunities in the first cabinet of Romano Prodi from 1996 to 1998. She stood for the Senate for the first time in the 2006 Italian general election; she was named as the group chair of the Olive Tree coalition following her election. Finocchiaro was named the leader of the PD in the Senate following the party's creation in 2007 and was reconfirmed as leader following the 2008 Italian general election. In 2008 she also stood unsuccessfully to be President of Sicily.

After being under investigation by the Italian courts for abuse of office and aggravated fraud, her husband was completely acquitted on all counts in 2018.
