= Laura Balbo =

Italian sociologist and politician (1933–2026)

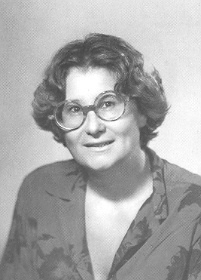
- Balbo in 1987

Minister for Equal Opportunities
- In office 21 October 1998 – 26 April 2000
- Prime Minister: Massimo D'Alema
- Preceded by: Anna Finocchiaro
- Succeeded by: Katia Bellillo

Member of the Chamber of Deputies
- In office 12 July 1983 – 22 April 1992
- Constituency: Milan–Pavia

Personal details
- Born: 30 November 1933 Padua, Italy
- Died: 16 April 2026 (aged 92) Padua, Italy
- Party: Independent Left; Federation of the Greens
- Education: University of Padua
- Occupation: Sociologist and politician

Laura Balbo (30 November 1933 – 16 April 2026) was an Italian sociologist and politician. A Fulbright Scholar, Balbo initially studied at the Universities of Padua and California, Berkeley before teaching at the Universities of Milan and Ferrara. She has also held visiting roles at Harvard University and the University of California, Santa Cruz. She has also served in the Italian Parliament, including holding cabinet positions under Massimo D'Alema between 1998 and 2000.

== Academic career ==
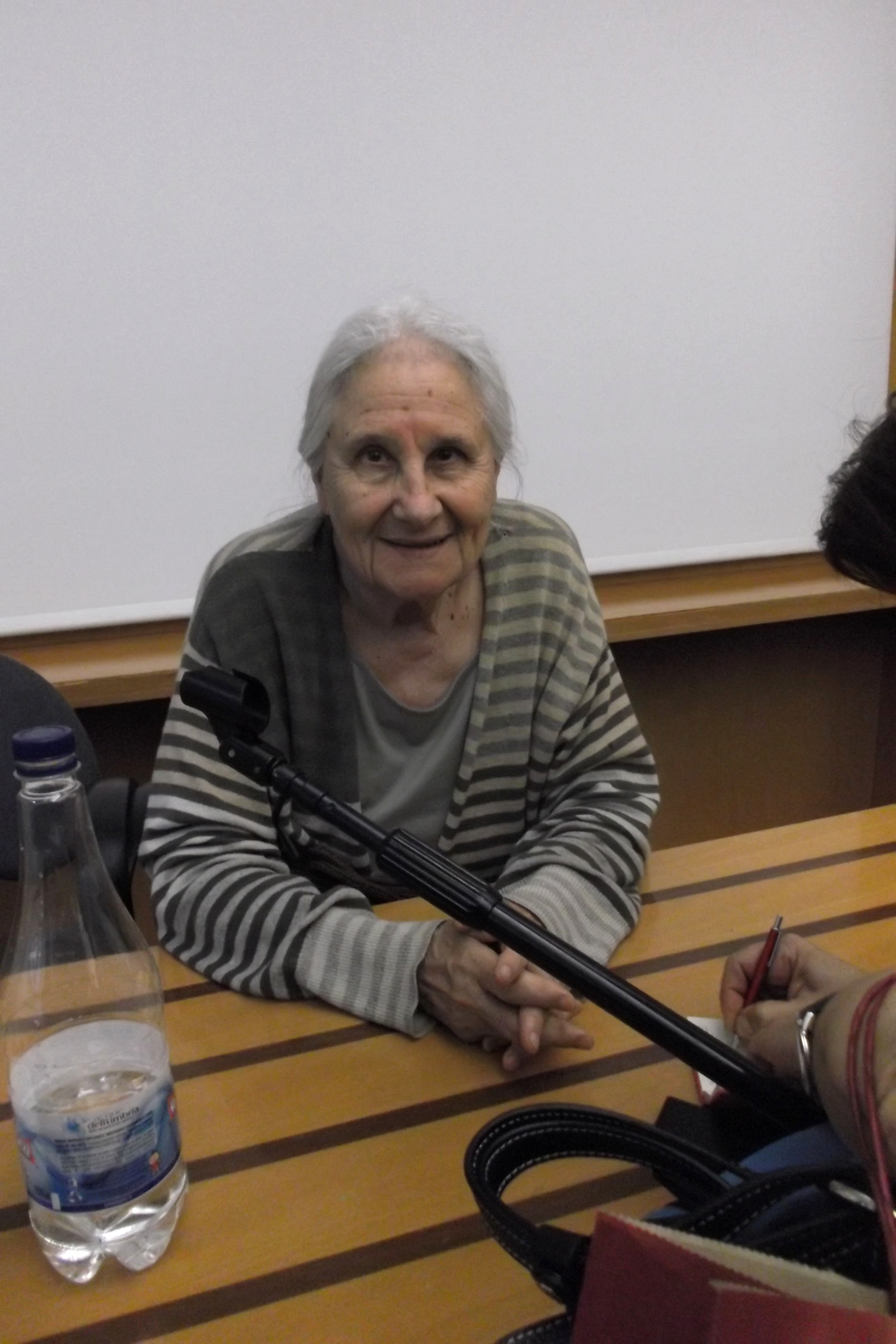
Balbo at International Women's House in Rome, 2016

Balbo graduated from the University of Padua in 1956 with a degree in sociology. She then went to the University of California, Berkeley as a Fulbright Scholar, returned to Italy and taught sociology at the University of Milan. She was appointed professor at the university in 1968 and was later dean of the Faculty of Humanities at the University of Ferrara.

Her work covers racism, urbanization, family policies and the welfare state. She has a particular interest in women in society and coined the term double presence (Italian: doppia presenza) to describe the way that women have a responsibility to both private, family life and the public world of work.

She was Senior Fulbright Fellow at the Center for European Studies at Harvard University, visiting scholar at the Radcliffe Institute for Advanced Study (1963–1965) and visiting associate professor at the University of California, Berkeley and Santa Cruz (1980).

== Political career ==
Balbo took leave from her university career and ran for parliament, gaining her first seat in 1983. She remained in parliament until 1992 as an independent and later as part of Sinistra indipendente (the Independent Left). She subsequently joined Verdi (the Greens).

She was asked by Massimo D'Alema to take on the role of Minister for Equal Opportunities from 1998 to 2000. She instigated efforts to expand the remit of equal opportunities to encompass discrimination on the basis of race and sexual orientation discrimination. For the first time in Italy, the issue of sexual orientation became the subject of a specific assignment in the Ministry, in the person of Franco Grillini. She also worked to strengthen women's representation in politics and improve female employment, including organising the first national conference on female employment in Naples in January 2000, opened by President Carlo Azeglio Ciampi. Between 2000 and 2001, she was a special advisor to the Prime Minister on issues of discrimination and racism.

== Death ==
Balbo died on 16 April 2026, at the age of 92.

== Works ==
Her publications include:

- Balbo, L. (1976). Stato di famiglia. Bisogni, privato, collettivo (in Italian). Milan: Etas.
- Balbo, L.; Siebert-Zahar, R. (1979). Interferenze. Lo Stato, la vita familiare, la vita privata (in Italian). Milan: Feltrinelli.
- Balbo, L. (1987). Time to care. Politiche del tempo e diritti quotidian (in Italian). Milan: Angeli.
- Balbo, L.; Manconi, L. (1990). I razzismi possibili (in Italian). Milan: Feltrinelli.
- Balbo, L. (1991). Tempi di vita. Studi e proposte per cambiarli' (in Italian). Milan: Feltrinelli.
- Balbo, L.; Manconi, L. (1992). I razzismi reali (in Italian). Milan: Feltrinelli.
- Balbo, L.; Manconi, L. (1993). Razzismi. Un vocabolario (in Italian). Milan: Feltrinelli.
- Balbo, L. (2002). Riflessioni in-attuali di una ex ministro. Pensare la politica anche sociologicamente (in Italian). Soveria Mannelli: Rubbettino.
- Balbo, L. (2008). In che razza di società vivremo? L'Europa, i razzismi, il futuro (in Italian). Milan: B. Mondadori.
- Balbo, L. (2008). Il lavoro e la cura. Imparare a cambiare (in Italian). Torino: Einaudi.
- Balbo, L.; Ruzzo, C. (2014). "Italian Populism and the Trajectories of Two Leaders: Silvio Berlusconi and Umberto Bossi". In Wodak; Khosravinik, Majid; Mral, Brigitte (eds.). Right-Wing Populism in Europe: Politics and Discourse. London: Bloomsbury.

== Other activities ==
Balbo was president of the Associazione Italiana di Sociologia (1998–2001). She worked as a consultant for the European Office of the World Health Organization in Copenhagen and UNESCO, led the Association Italia-Razzismo and chaired the International Association for the Study of Racism (IASR), based in Amsterdam.

== Honour ==
- Italy: Knight Grand Cross of the Order of Merit of the Italian Republic (6 November 2000)
