= STS-100 =

2001 American crewed spaceflight to the ISS

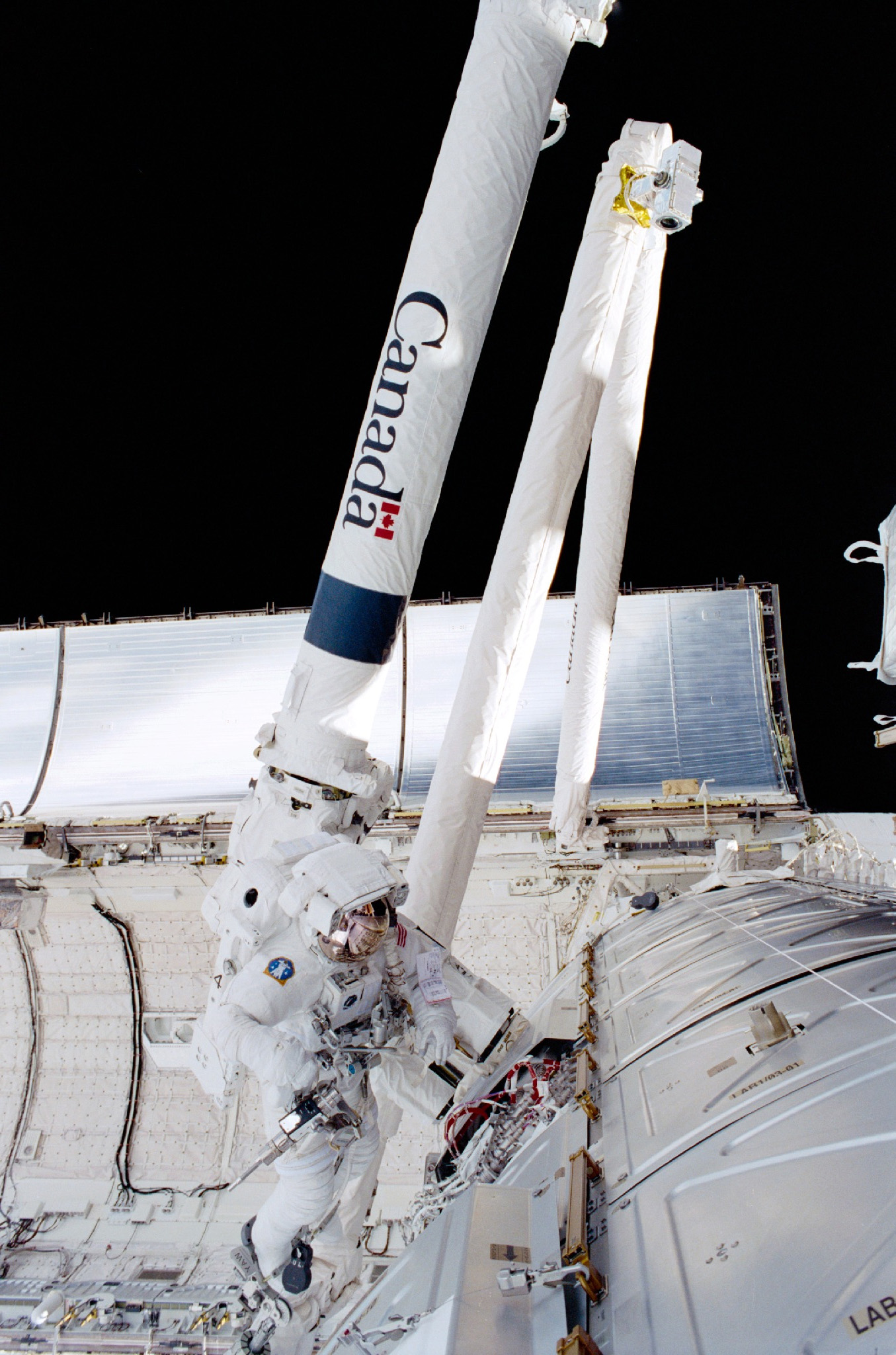
- Parazynski assists in installing Canadarm2 on the ISS during EVA 1, with Endeavour in the background
- Names: Space Transportation System-100
- Mission type: ISS assembly/logistics
- Operator: NASA
- COSPAR ID: 2001-016A
- SATCAT no.: 26747
- Mission duration: 11 days, 21 hours, 31 minutes, 14 seconds

Spacecraft properties
- Spacecraft: Space Shuttle Endeavour
- Launch mass: 103,506 kilograms (228,192 lb)
- Landing mass: 99,742 kilograms (219,893 lb)
- Payload mass: 4,899 kilograms (10,800 lb)

Crew
- Crew size: 7
- Members: Kent V. Rominger; Jeffrey S. Ashby; Chris A. Hadfield; John L. Phillips; Scott E. Parazynski; Umberto Guidoni; Yury Lonchakov
- EVAs: 2
- EVA duration: 14 hours, 50 minutes

Start of mission
- Launch date: 19 April 2001, 18:40:42 UTC
- Launch site: Kennedy, LC-39A

End of mission
- Landing date: 1 May 2001, 16:11:56 UTC
- Landing site: Edwards, Runway 22

Orbital parameters
- Reference system: Geocentric
- Regime: Low Earth
- Perigee altitude: 331 kilometres (206 mi)
- Apogee altitude: 375 kilometres (233 mi)
- Inclination: 51.5 deg
- Period: 91.59 minutes
- Epoch: 21 April 2001

Docking with ISS
- Docking port: PMA-2 (Destiny forward)
- Docking date: 21 April 2001, 13:59 UTC
- Undocking date: 29 April 2001, 17:34 UTC
- Time docked: 8 days, 3 hours, 35 minutes
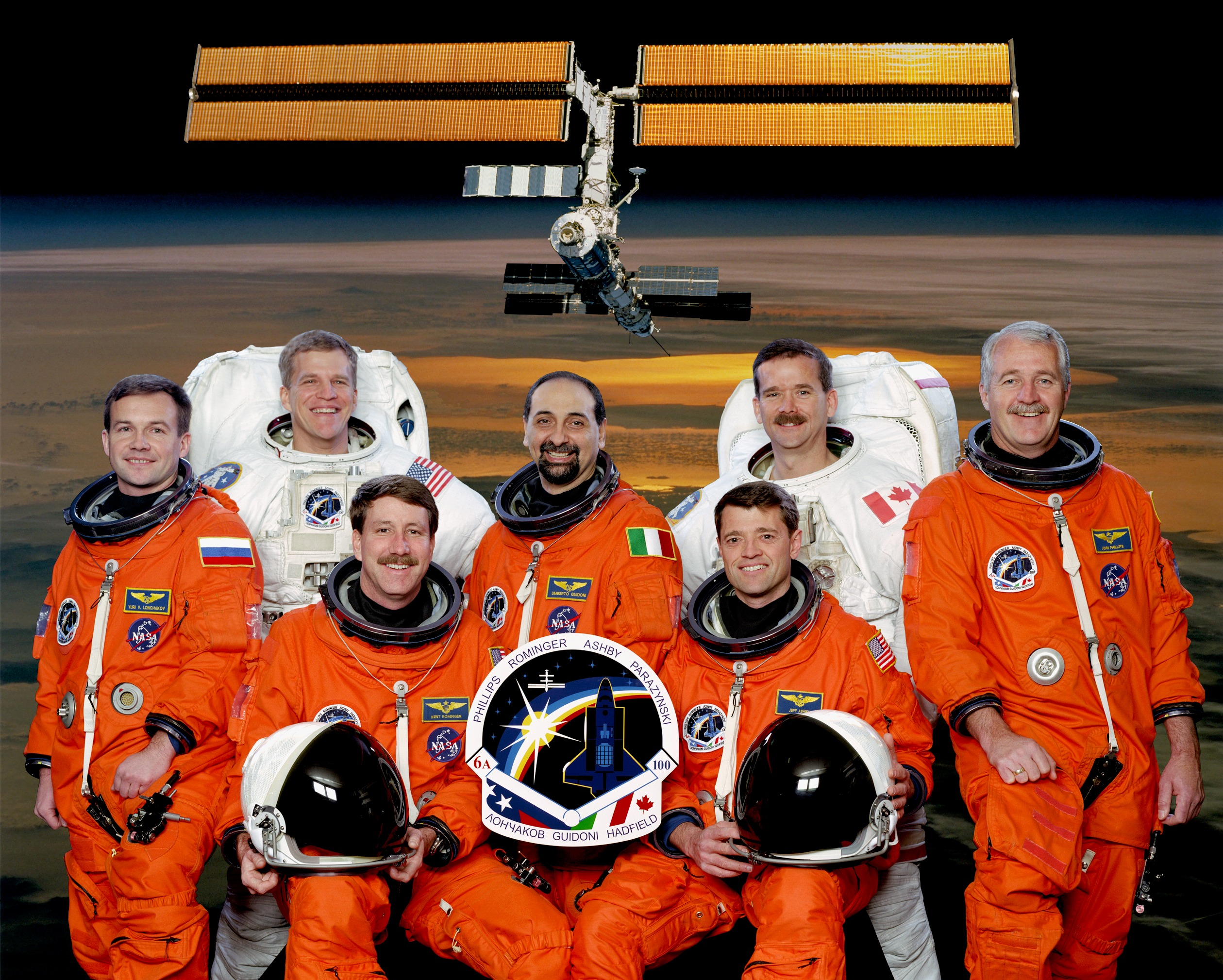
- Left to right: Front row - Lonchakov, Rominger (commander), Guidoni, Ashby (pilot), Phillips; Back row - Parazynski, Hadfield Space Shuttle program

STS-100 was a Space Shuttle mission to the International Space Station (ISS) flown by Space Shuttle Endeavour. STS-100 launched on 19 April 2001, and installed the ISS Canadarm2 robotic arm.

== Crew ==
Position	Astronaut
Commander	(United States) Kent V. Rominger; Fifth and last spaceflight
Pilot	(United States) Jeffrey S. Ashby; Second spaceflight
Mission Specialist 1	(Canada) Chris Hadfield, CSA; Second spaceflight
Mission Specialist 2 Flight Engineer	(United States) John L. Phillips; First spaceflight
Mission Specialist 3	(United States) Scott E. Parazynski; Fourth spaceflight
Mission Specialist 4	(Italy) Umberto Guidoni, ESA; Second and last spaceflight
Mission Specialist 5	(Russia) Yury Lonchakov, RKA; First spaceflight

=== Crew seat assignments ===
Seat	Launch	Landing	Seats 1–4 are on the flight deck. Seats 5–8 are on the mid-deck.
1	Rominger		Seats 1–4 are on the flight deck. Seats 5–8 are on the mid-deck.
2	Ashby		Seats 1–4 are on the flight deck. Seats 5–8 are on the mid-deck.
3	Hadfield	Guidoni	Seats 1–4 are on the flight deck. Seats 5–8 are on the mid-deck.
4	Phillips		Seats 1–4 are on the flight deck. Seats 5–8 are on the mid-deck.
5	Parazynski		Seats 1–4 are on the flight deck. Seats 5–8 are on the mid-deck.
6	Guidoni	Hadfield	Seats 1–4 are on the flight deck. Seats 5–8 are on the mid-deck.
7	Lonchakov		Seats 1–4 are on the flight deck. Seats 5–8 are on the mid-deck.

== Mission highlights ==
The highest priority objectives of the flight were the installation, activation and checkout of the Canadarm2 robotic arm on the station. The arm - manufactured by MDA Space Missions under contract of the Canadian Space Agency and NASA, went into operation on 28 April 2001. It was critical to the capability to continue assembly of the International Space Station. The arm was also necessary to attach a new airlock to the station on the subsequent shuttle flight, mission STS-104. The final component of the Canadarm is the Mobile Base System (MBS), which was installed on board the station during the STS-111 flight.

Other major objectives for Endeavour's mission were to berth the Raffaello logistics module to the station, activate it, transfer cargo between Raffaello and the station, and reberth Raffaello in the shuttle's payload bay. Raffaello is the second of three Italian Space Agency-developed Multi-Purpose Logistics Module, manufactured out of stainless steel at the Cannes Mandelieu Space Center; that were launched to the station. The Leonardo module was launched and returned on the previous shuttle flight, STS-102, in March.

Remaining objectives included the transfer of other equipment to the station such as an Ultra-High Frequency communications antenna and a spare electronics component to be attached to the exterior during space walks. Finally, the transfer of supplies and water for use aboard the station, the transfer of experiments and experiment racks to the complex, and the transfer of items for return to Earth from the station to the shuttle were among the objectives.

Endeavour also boosted the station's altitude and performed a flyaround survey of the complex, including recording views of the station with an IMAX cargo bay camera.

All objectives were completed without incident, and reentry and landing happened uneventfully on 1 May 2001.

During this mission, astronaut Chris Hadfield made the first spacewalk by a Canadian.

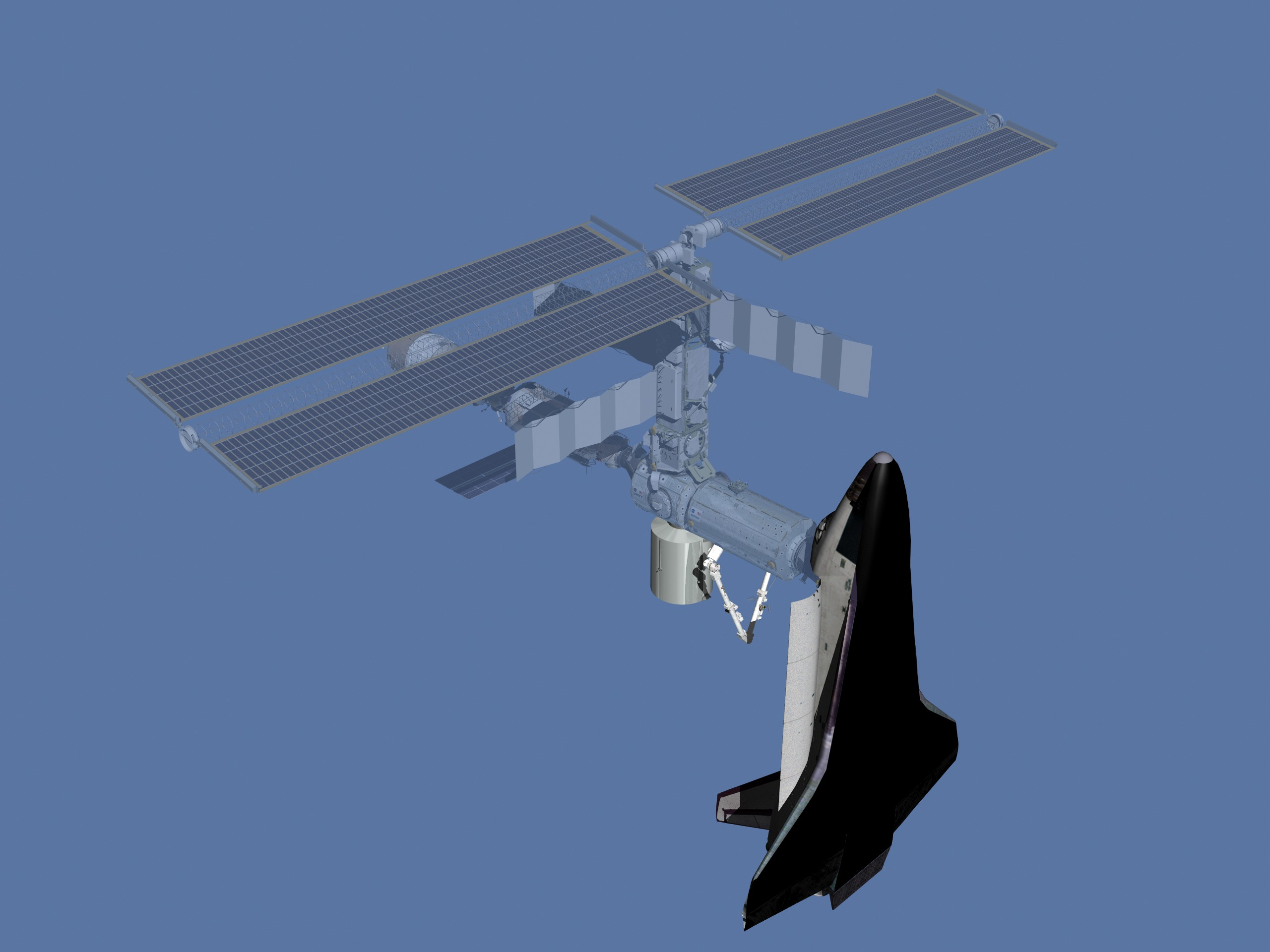
Illustration of the International Space Station during STS-100

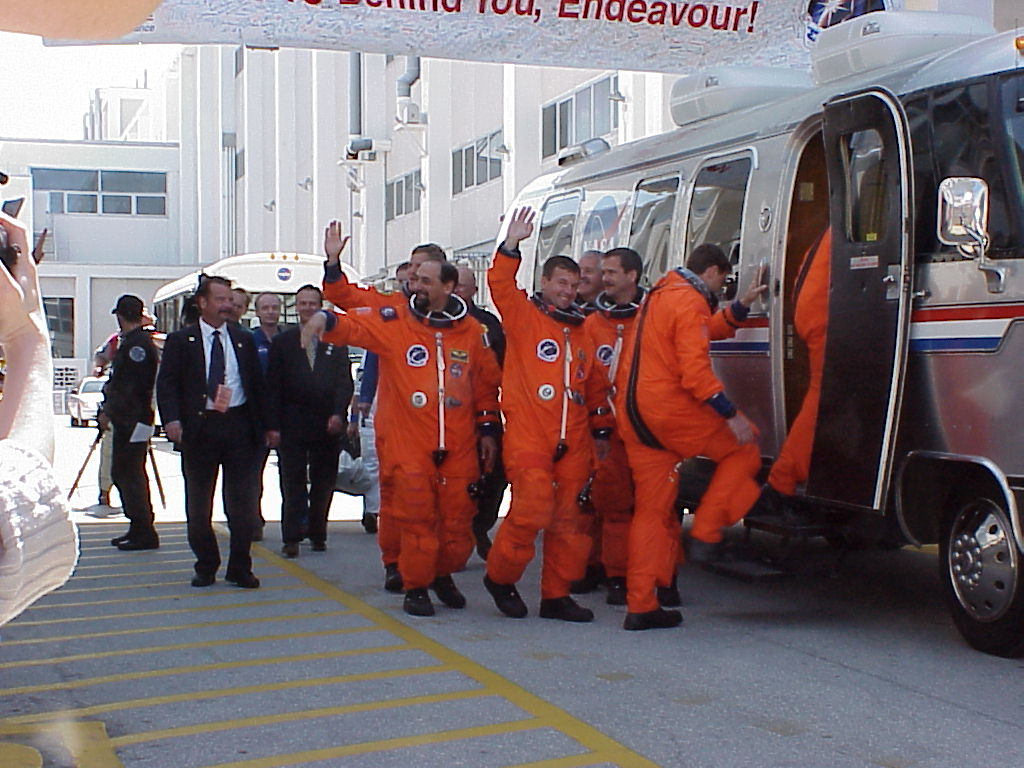
STS-100 Crew as they prepare to ride over to the shuttle just hours before the launch

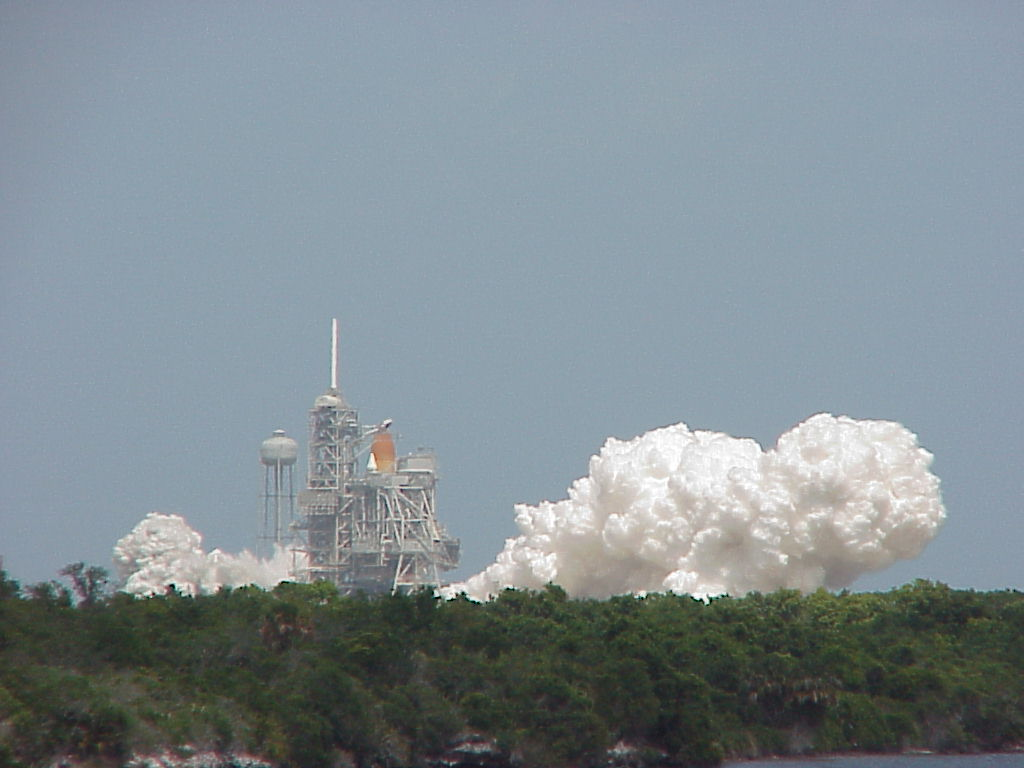
STS-100's engines ignite

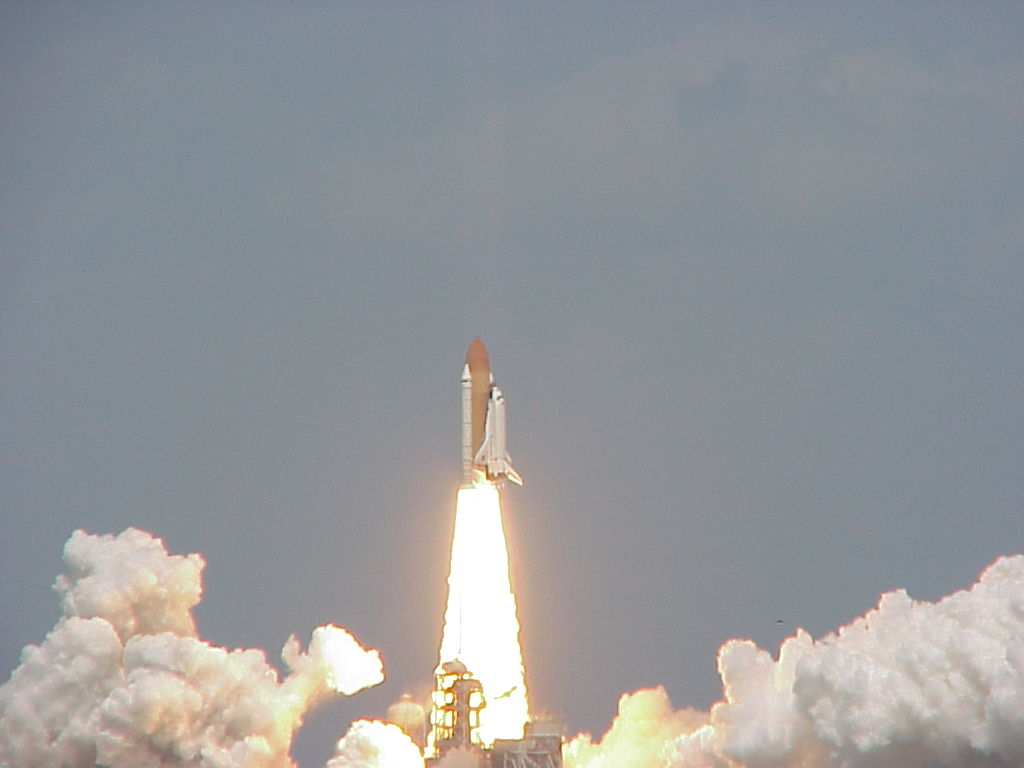
STS-100 Liftoff

== Spacewalks ==
EVA	Spacewalkers	Start (UTC)	End	Duration
EVA 1	Scott Parazynski; Chris Hadfield	22 April 2001; 11:45	22 April 2001; 18:55	7 hours 10 minutes
EVA 1	Parazynski and Hadfield deployed a UHF antenna on the Destiny lab. After that, the pair began installing the Canadarm2. Parazynski and Hadfield encountered a problem ensuring the proper torque was applied to the bolt. The pair switched the Pistol Grip Tool (PGT) to manual mode and attempted again successfully. Hadfield experienced severe eye irritation during the spacewalk due to the anti-fog solution used to polish his spacesuit visor, temporarily blinding him and forcing him to vent oxygen into space. Other astronauts experienced a similar problem on subsequent spacewalks.			
EVA 2	Parazynski; Hadfield	24 April 2001; 12:34	24 April 2001; 20:14	7 hours 40 minutes
EVA 2	Connected Power and Data Grapple Fixture (PDGF) circuits for the new arm on Destiny. Removed an early communications antenna and transferred a spare Direct Current Switching Unit (DCSU) from the shuttle's payload bay to an equipment storage rack on the outside of Destiny.			

== Wake-up calls ==
NASA began a tradition of playing music to astronauts during the Gemini program, which was first used to wake up a flight crew during Apollo 15. Each track is specially chosen, often by their families, and usually has a special meaning to an individual member of the crew, or is applicable to their daily activities.

Flight Day	Song	Artist/Composer
Day 2	"Then the Morning Comes"	Smash Mouth
Day 3	"Danger Zone"	Kenny Loggins from the soundtrack to Top Gun
Day 4	"Take It From Day to Day"	Stan Rogers
Day 5	"Both Sides Now"	Judy Collins
Day 6	"What a Wonderful World"	Louis Armstrong
Day 7	"Con te Partirò"	Andrea Bocelli
Day 8	"Behind the Fog"	Russian Folk Singer
Day 9	"Buckaroo"	Don Cain
Day 10	"Dangerous"	The Arrogant Worms
Day 11	"Miles From Nowhere"	Cat Stevens
Day 12	"Big Arm on his Ship"	Robinson etc.
Day 13	"True"	Spandau Ballet

== See also ==
- List of human spaceflights
- List of International Space Station spacewalks
- List of Space Shuttle missions
- List of spacewalks 2000–2014
- Outline of space science
