= Umberto Guidoni =

Italian astronaut and politician (born 1954)

Umberto Guidoni OMRI
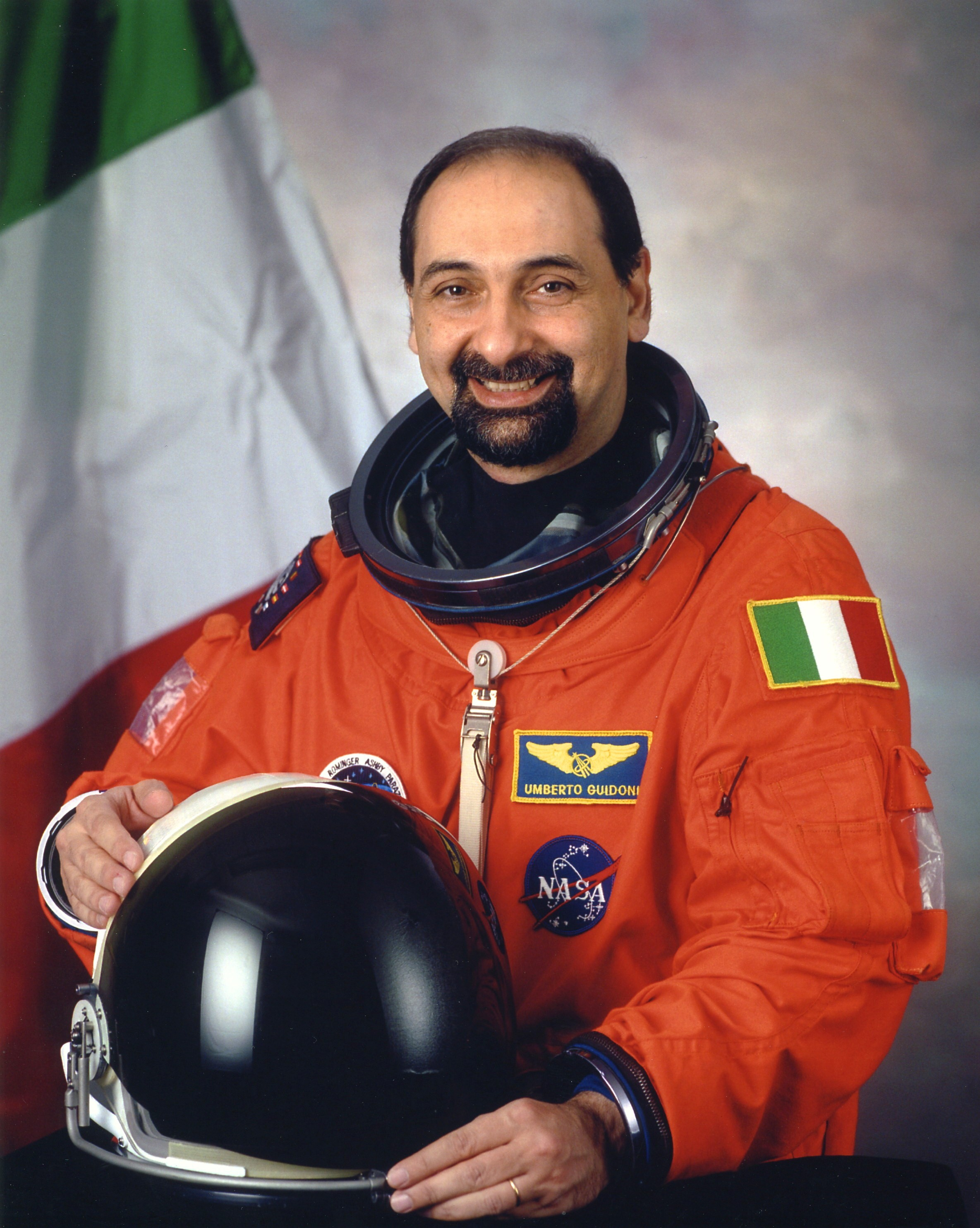
- Guidoni in 2001

Member of the European Parliament
- In office 20 July 2004 – 13 July 2009

Personal details
- Born: 18 August 1954 (age 72) Rome, Italy
- Party: PdCI (2004–2009); SEL (2009–2016)
- Occupation: Astrophysicist, Science writer
- Space career

ASI/ESA astronaut
- Time in space: 27d 15h 12m
- Selection: 1989 ASI Group/1996 NASA Group (16)
- Missions: STS-75, STS-100
- Retired: June 2004

Umberto Guidoni (born 18 August 1954 in Rome) is an Italian astrophysicist, science writer and a former ESA astronaut, being the first European to visit the International Space Station. He is a veteran of two NASA Space Shuttle missions. He was also a Member of the European Parliament (MEP) from 2004 to 2009, with the Group of the European United Left (GUE/NGL).

== Biography ==
=== Career and spaceflights ===
Guidoni earned a doctorate in astrophysics from the University of Rome La Sapienza in 1978 and worked in the Italian Space Agency (ASI) as well as in the European Space Agency (ESA). One of his research projects was the Tethered Satellite System, which was part of the payload of the STS-46 mission. Guidoni trained as an alternate payload specialist for that mission and made his first spaceflight aboard the Space Shuttle Columbia STS-75 in 1996, which included the second flight of the TSS system (TSS-1R).

In 2001, Guidoni participated in the Space Shuttle's STS-100 mission, being the first European on board International Space Station (ISS).

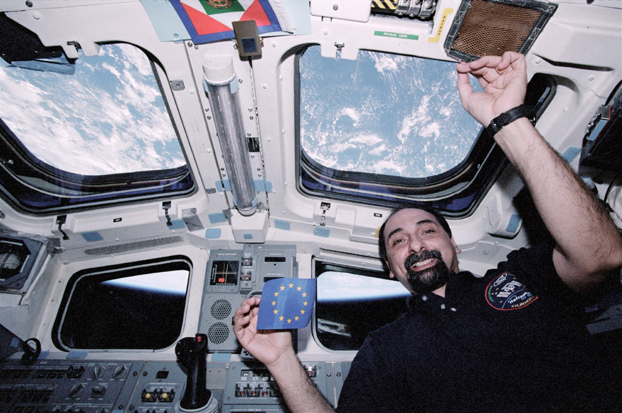
First European on board the ISS shows EU flag

On that flight, the Space Shuttle Endeavour carried the Raffaello Multi-Purpose Logistics Module for its maiden flight as well as the Space Station Remote Manipulator System (SSRMS), the Canadian robotic arm used extensively to assemble the ISS.

=== ESA career ===
In September 2001, Guidoni was assigned to ESA's European Space Research and Technology Centre (ESTEC) as crew support for the payloads to be developed for the Columbus Laboratory. Columbus and its payloads are the European contribution to the scientific research performed on board the International Space Station. He retired from active astronaut status in June 2004.

=== Member of the European Parliament ===
In June 2004 Guidoni was elected to the European Parliament, in the Group of the European United Left (GUE/NGL). He was a member of the Committee on Budgetary Control and the Committee on Industry, Research and Energy (ITRE), and substitute of the Committee on the Environment, Public Health and Food Safety (ENVI), and the Temporary Committee on Climate Change. He has been rapporteur for the Seventh Framework Programme (FP7) for Research and Innovation. He also proposed the amendment 16 to protect the freedom of the press from the strict application of the EU directive (IPRED2) on criminal measures aimed at ensuring the enforcement of intellectual property rights.

Guidoni joined the Party of Italian Communists (PdCI) around 2004. He led a tendency within PdCI called 'Unite the Left'. Guidoni left PdCI in 2009.

=== Present activity ===
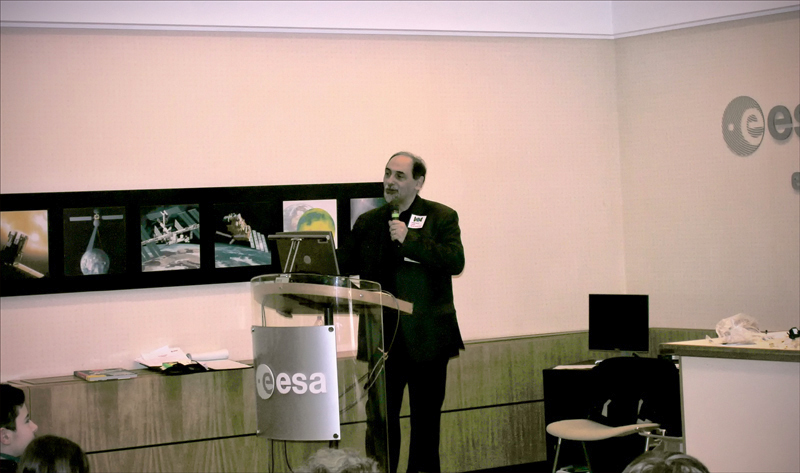
Umberto Guidoni 2011 (ESA-ESRIN, Frascati)

In 2007 was the speaker of the radio program entitled "From the Sputnik to the Shuttle" (the series "At 8 in the evening" by Radio Rai 2), in which he retraced the main steps of the Space Era. In 2009, he presented another cycle of the same series where he narrated the epic history of the Apollo lunar missions. Starting from this program, in 2011, was published the book "From the Earth to the Moon".

Guidoni is involved in popularizing science and organizes events related to space. He has written articles and books including books for children such as "Martino on Mars", "Astrolibro" and the most recent published in 2019: "Voglio la LUNA" and "Guida per Giovani Astronauti".

== Honours ==
On 15 April 1996, Guidoni was appointed Commander of the Order of Merit of the Italian Republic by Oscar Luigi Scalfaro, President of Italy.

On 11 May 2001, he was promoted to Grand Officer of the Order of Merit of the Italian Republic by Carlo Azeglio Ciampi, President of Italy.

For his first orbital flight (STS-75) in 1996, Guidoni also received the NASA Space Flight Medal

A second Space Flight Medal was awarded after his second space flight of 2001 (STS-100).

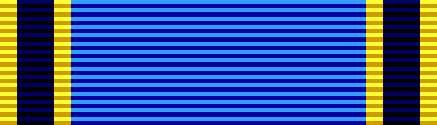
For his achievements in space, Guidoni received the NASA Exceptional Service Medal in 2002.

The asteroid 10605 Guidoni discovered by V. Giuliani e F. Manca on 1996.
