= Barbara Pollastrini =

Italian politician

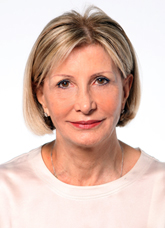

Minister for Equal Opportunities
- In office 17 May 2006 – 8 May 2008
- Prime Minister: Romano Prodi
- Preceded by: Stefania Prestigiacomo
- Succeeded by: Mara Carfagna

Member of the Chamber of Deputies
- In office 30 May 2001 – 13 October 2022
- Constituency: Lombardy 1
- In office 23 April 1992 – 14 April 1994
- Constituency: Milan

Personal details
- Born: 30 September 1947 (age 79) Darfo Boario Terme, Brescia, Italy
- Party: Democratic Party
- Spouse(s): Renato Mannheimer (divorced); Pietro Modiano (executive director of Intesa Sanpaolo)
- Education: Bocconi University
- Profession: Professor

Barbara Pollastrini (born 30 September 1947 in Darfo Boario Terme, Province of Brescia) is an Italian politician and university professor.

During the Protests of 1968, she joined the Maoist organization Servire il Popolo, becoming also the director of the Milan office.

After obtaining a degree at the Bocconi University in Milan, and a period of study at École pratique des hautes études in Paris, France, she started teaching at the University of Milan.

She joined the Italian Communist Party and became the leader of the Milan office, after a period as city councillor.

She retired from politics when was indicted for political corruption during the inquiry called Mani pulite, until her acquittal in 1996. She subsequently joined the Democratic Party of the Left and in 1999, she became head of the women's group of the Democrats of the Left.

During the general election in 2001, she was elected at the Chamber of Deputies. On 17 May 2006, she was nominated Minister for Equal Opportunity during the Prodi II Cabinet, working on DiCo bill, with the Minister of Family, Rosy Bindi.

Since 23 May 2007, she has been a member of the National Committee for the Democratic Party. On 7 May 2017, Pollastrini was appointed Vice President of the Democratic Party, representing the left wing of the party.
