= Elettra Pollastrini =

Italian politician

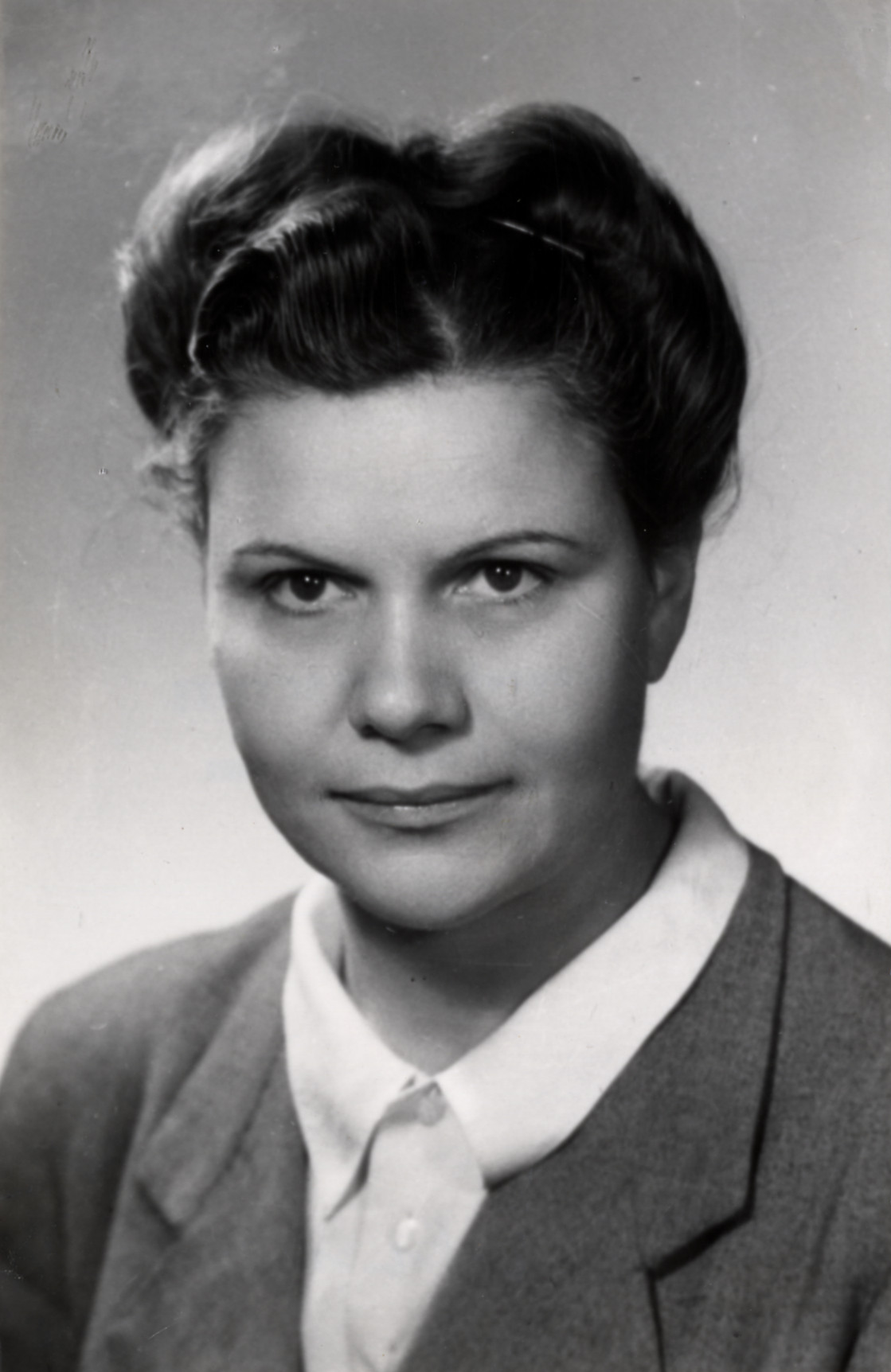
- Pollastrini in 1948

Member of the Chamber of Deputies
- In office 1948–1958

Member of the Constituent Assembly
- In office 1946–1948

Member of the National Council
- In office 1945–1946

Personal details
- Born: 15 July 1908 Rieti, Kingdom of Italy
- Died: 2 February 1990 (aged 81) Rieti, Italy
- Occupation: Partisan; politician

Elettra Pollastrini (15 July 1908 – 2 February 1990) was an Italian politician. She was elected to the Constituent Assembly in 1946 as one of the first group of women parliamentarians in Italy.

== Biography ==
Pollastrini was born in Rieti in 1908. Her family moved to La Spezia, where she completed school. Opposed to Benito Mussolini's fascist government, her family relocated to France during the 1920s, where she worked for Renault. In the 1930s she joined the International Brigades in the Spanish Civil War. After returning to France, she was jailed by the Nazi authorities, initially in Rieucros. She was extradited to Italy in 1941, where she lived under surveillance in Rieti. After joining the resistance and attempting to form a communist cell in the town, she was arrested again in 1943. In January 1944 she was transferred to the Aichach prison camp in Germany.

She returned to Italy at the end of World War II and was nominated to the National Council by the Italian Communist Party (PCI). She was subsequently a PCI candidate in the 1946 elections and was one of 21 women elected. She was elected to the Chamber of Deputies in the 1948 elections and re-elected in 1953, serving in parliament until the 1958 elections, after which she moved to Budapest to work for Magyar Rádió. She later returned to Rieti, where she died in 1990. A street in the city was named after her.
