= Opinion polling for the 2022 Italian general election =

In the years running up to the 2022 Italian general election, held on 25 September, various organisations carried out opinion polls to gauge voting intention in Italy. Results of such polls are given in this article. The date range is from after the 2018 Italian general election, held on 4 March, to 9 September 2022. Poll results are reported at the dates when the fieldwork was done, as opposed to the date of publication; if such date is unknown, the date of publication is given instead. Under the Italian par condicio (equal conditions) law, publication of opinion polls is forbidden in the last two weeks of an electoral campaign.

== Polling aggregation ==
Polling aggregations are performed by taking weighted or unweighted averages of election polls. They are all from 2022.

Party vote

Polling firm	Administered	Updated	M5S	PD	Lega	FI	FdI	AVS	+E	A–IV	Italexit	IC	NM	UP	Others	Lead
Election results	25 Sep	–	15.4	19.1	8.8	8.1	26.0	3.6	2.8	7.8	1.9	0.6	0.9	1.4	3.9	6.9
Cassandra	17 Aug–9 Sep	10 Sep	13.2	21.0	11.8	7.5	24.5	3.4	1.9	6.7	2.7	1.2	1.4	1.2	2.7	3.5
Termometro Politico	4–9 Sep	9 Sep	13.0	21.5	12.2	7.7	24.7	3.5		7.7	2.6				8.8	3.2
BiDiMedia	25 Aug–9 Sep	9 Sep	13.4	21.5	12.0	7.7	24.8	3.6	2.0	6.8	2.8	1.2	1.5	1.2	1.5	3.3
Supermedia YouTrend	26 Aug–8 Sep	9 Sep	13.2	21.5	12.1	7.8	24.4	3.7	2.1	6.8	2.8	1.1	1.5	1.1	1.9	2.9

Coalition vote

Polling firm	Administered	Updated	Centre-right	M5S	Centre-left	A–IV	Others/Abroad	Lead
Election results	25 Sep	–	43.8	15.6	26.1	7.7	6.8	17.7
Cassandra	17 Aug–9 Sep	10 Sep	45.5	13.2	27.7	6.7	6.7	17.8
BiDiMedia	25 Aug–9 Sep	9 Sep	46.0	13.4	28.3	6.8	5.5	17.7
Supermedia YouTrend	26 Aug–8 Sep	9 Sep	45.8	13.2	28.4	6.8	5.4	17.4
Supermedia YouTrend	24 Aug–1 Sep	2 Sep	47.2	11.8	28.9	6.2	5.9	18.3
Supermedia YouTrend	11–24 Aug	25 Aug	48.2	10.9	29.5	5.9	5.5	18.7

Seat projections (Chamber of Deputies)

Polling firm	Administered	Updated	Centre-right	M5S	Centre-left	A–IV	SVP–PATT	Italexit	Others/Abroad	Lead	Majority
Election results	25 Sep	–	237	52	85	21	3	0	2	152	+36
Cassandra	17 Aug–9 Sep	10 Sep	247	40	88	18	3	3	1	159	+46
BiDiMedia	15 Aug–9 Sep	10 Sep	252	35	83	18	3	0		169	+51

Seat projections (Senate of the Republic)

Polling firm	Administered	Updated	Centre-right	M5S	Centre-left	A–IV	SVP–PATT	Italexit	Others/Abroad	Lead	Majority
Election results	25 Sep	–	115	28	44	9	2	0	2	71	+11
Cassandra	17 Aug–9 Sep	10 Sep	125	22	40	9	2	1	1	85	+21

== Party vote ==
Parties or lists are ordered according to their share of the vote in 2018. Power to the People and Us with Italy remain active but have been rarely polled after 2019. New parties and lists like Green Europe, We Are Europeans/Action, Cambiamo!, Italia Viva, Italexit, Coraggio Italia, and Together for the Future/Civic Commitment are ordered by foundation date. From May–December 2021, Coraggio Italia replaced Cambiamo! From January–August 2022, most pollers listed together Action and More Europe by their own request.

Starting from the beginning of 2019, some agencies polled Free and Equal (LeU), others The Left (LS), and some others both. The two lists, LeU for the 2018 Italian general election and LS for the 2019 European Parliament election in Italy, have slightly different but partially overlapping compositions: the former included Article One (Art.1), the latter had the Communist Refoundation Party, which was part of Power to the People in 2018, and both included Italian Left (SI). Since May 2021, most pollsters started to give data separately for Art.1 and SI. Starting in late April 2022, Art.1 was sometimes included within the Democratic Party's polling numbers. By August 2022, Art.1 joined the Democratic Party – Democratic and Progressive Italy alliance, while SI formed the Greens and Left Alliance list with Green Europe; both lists are part of the centre-left coalition.

=== Graphical summary ===
Local regression trend line of poll results from 4 March 2018 to 9 September 2022. Each line corresponds to the 2022 general election party lists.

=== 2022 ===
Fieldwork date	Polling firm	Sample size	M5S	PD (Note: For some polls, they show the arithmetic sum of the Democratic Party – Democratic and Progressive Italy (PD–IDP) alliance.)	Lega	FI	FdI	AVS	+E	A–IV (Note: For some polls, they show the arithmetic sum of the Action – Italia Viva (A–IV) alliance.)	Italexit	IC	NM (Note: For some polls, they show the arithmetic sum of Us with Italy–Italy in the Centre (NcI–IaC) and Coraggio Italia–Union of the Centre (CI–UdC).)	UP	Others	Lead
25 Sep	Election results	–	15.4	19.1	8.8	8.1	26.0	3.6	2.8	7.8	1.9	0.6	0.9	1.4	3.9	6.9
9 Sep	Piepoli	–	11.5	21.5	12.0	9.5	23.5	4.0	2.5	6.5	2.0	2.0	2.0		3.0	2.0
8–9 Sep	BiDiMedia	3,045	13.1	22.3	11.8	6.7	25.8	4.0	1.6	7.0	2.4	0.7	1.4	1.2	2.0	3.5
7–9 Sep	Quorum – YouTrend	1,000	13.8	21.2	12.9	7.9	25.3	3.4	2.2	5.5	2.4	1.2	1.1	1.0	2.1	4.1
6–9 Sep	SWG	1,200	12.0	20.4	12.1	6.7	27.0	4.0	2.1	7.5	2.9	1.0	1.4	1.0	1.9	6.6
6–9 Sep	Lab2101	1,000	12.0	24.7	15.7	6.0	23.3	2.6	1.2	6.7		2.8	2.1		2.8	1.4
8 Sep	Cluster17	2,018	14.1	20.8	11.3	8.4	24.4	3.6	2.4	6.8	3.3	0.6	0.7	1.2	2.3	3.6
7–8 Sep	IZI	1,001	15.4	21.4	10.0	8.6	25.0	4.2	1.5	5.5	2.9	0.9	0.6	2.0	2.0	3.6
6–8 Sep	Termometro Politico	4,600	13.3	22.2	13.3	7.2	25.2	2.6	1.6	5.1	2.8	0.7	1.1	1.7	3.2	3.0
6–8 Sep	Tecnè	2,003	12.2	21.6	11.4	10.2	25.4	3.2	2.0	6.4	2.6	0.9	1.3		2.8	3.8
7 Sep	Euromedia	800	13.0	21.8	11.8	7.2	24.7	3.8	1.7	7.8	2.6	1.0	1.6			2.9
6–7 Sep	Noto	1,000	13.5	19.5	13.0	6.9	24.3	2.7	1.3	7.7	2.7	2.2	2.5		3.7	4.8
6–7 Sep	Index Research	800	14.0	21.1	11.0	7.0	26.5	4.0	2.0	7.2	3.0	0.9	1.1	1.0	1.2	5.4
5–7 Sep	GDC	1,637	12.3	21.5	12.5	7.3	24.4	3.2	2.3	7.7	2.5	0.9	3.1		2.2	2.9
5–7 Sep	EMG	1,000	13.0	19.5	12.0	8.0	24.5	3.0	3.0	8.0	2.5	1.5	3.0		2.0	5.0
5–7 Sep	Demos & Pi	1,001	13.8	22.4	12.0	7.7	24.6	3.4	2.2	6.8	2.0				5.1	2.2
5–7 Sep	Demopolis	3,000	12.8	22.4	13.5	6.9	25.0	3.5		7.0	3.0				5.9	2.6
4–7 Sep	BiDiMedia	12,000	12.0	23.3	12.3	6.7	25.3	4.1	1.7	6.4	2.5	0.7	1.5	1.3	2.2	2.0
3–7 Sep	Hokuto	1,500	14.5	20.2	11.0	7.0	26.8	3.5	1.1	7.2	3.2	0.5	0.5		4.4	6.6
5–6 Sep	BiDiMedia	1,214	11.6	23.7	12.5	6.7	24.7	4.1	1.6	6.6	2.4	0.7	1.5	1.5	3.1	1.0
4–6 Sep	Ipsos	1,000	14.5	20.5	12.5	8.0	25.1	3.4	2.5	6.7	3.0	0.8	1.0	1.0	1.0	4.6
5 Sep	EMG	1,423	12.0	20.9	12.3	8.2	23.8	3.1	2.3	7.7	2.9	1.2	3.1	1.1	1.4	2.9
4–5 Sep	Ipsos	1,000	14.8	21.6	11.8	8.0	25.5	3.6	2.1	6.5	3.0	0.6	0.5	0.7	1.4	3.9
1–5 Sep	Tecnè	2,000	11.9	21.9	12.1	10.4	24.8	3.0	2.1	6.1	2.4	0.9	1.4		3.9	2.9
31 Aug–5 Sep	CISE	861	16.6	21.4	9.6	8.0	23.0	5.9	2.3	5.3	3.6	1.4	0.9		2.0	1.6
31 Aug–5 Sep	SWG	1,200	11.9	21.4	12.1	6.7	25.8	4.2	1.9	7.2	3.1	1.3	1.5	1.2	1.7	4.4
2–4 Sep	Quorum – YouTrend	1,000	12.1	21.9	13.5	8.1	24.2	3.5	2.2	5.2	2.6	0.9	1.5	1.2	3.1	2.3
31 Aug–4 Sep	GPF	3,000	13.4	22.6	12.7	8.0	24.4	3.9	1.2	5.3	3.6	0.8	0.5	0.8	2.7	1.8
1–2 Sep	Demopolis	2,004	12.3	22.4	13.6	7.2	24.5	3.5		7.0	3.0				6.5	2.1
29 Aug–2 Sep	Ixè	1,209	13.8	21.7	10.9	7.9	22.7	3.5	2.7	7.1	2.5	0.8	1.2		5.2	1.0
29 Aug–2 Sep	Lab2101	1,000	11.1	25.3	16.8	6.0	22.8	2.8	1.5	6.5		1.9	2.5		2.8	2.5
31 Aug–1 Sep	Termometro Politico	5,500	11.6	23.0	13.9	7.0	24.8	2.7	1.7	5.1	2.8	0.6	1.1	1.5	4.2	2.8
30–31 Aug	IZI	1,037	13.0	21.8	12.0	8.0	24.5	4.5	2.0	5.2	2.6	0.6	0.6	1.4	3.8	2.7
30–31 Aug	Noto	1,000	12.5	20.0	13.5	7.5	23.5	3.0	2.0	8.0	2.8	1.5	2.5		3.2	3.5
30 Aug	Piepoli	–	11.0	22.0	12.0	10.0	23.5	4.5	2.0	6.0	2.5	2.0	1.5		3.0	1.5
29–30 Aug	BiDiMedia	1,208	11.0	24.3	12.7	6.6	24.5	3.8	1.9	6.2	2.5	0.7	1.6	1.3	2.9	0.2
29–30 Aug	Ipsos	1,000	13.4	23.0	13.4	8.0	24.0	4.1	2.0	5.0	3.0	0.8	1.0	1.1	1.2	1.0
29–30 Aug	Euromedia	800	12.3	23.1	12.5	7.0	24.6	3.1	1.5	7.4	2.7	1.0	2.0		2.8	1.5
29 Aug	EMG	1,523	11.7	21.3	12.8	8.4	23.2	3.4	2.1	7.0	2.9	1.3	3.1	1.2	2.6	1.9
26–29 Aug	Tecnè	2,000	10.9	22.2	12.9	10.9	24.6	3.1	2.4	5.1	2.6	0.8	1.3		3.2	2.4
24–29 Aug	SWG	1,200	11.6	22.3	12.5	7.0	24.8	4.0	1.5	6.8	3.4	1.2	1.6		3.3	2.5
25–28 Aug	GDC	1,096	11.1	22.5	13.1	7.3	24.2	3.3	2.7	5.8	2.8	1.1	3.0		3.1	1.7
24–27 Aug	Quorum – YouTrend	1,005	11.1	22.7	13.8	8.7	24.1	3.2	2.9	5.3	2.5	0.7	1.9	1.2	2.0	1.4
25 Aug	Piepoli	–	11.0	22.0	12.5	8.0	24.5	3.0	2.0	7.0	2.5	1.5			6.0	2.5
25 Aug	BiDiMedia	1,300	10.8	24.1	13.0	6.6	24.7	3.9	1.9	6.1	2.6	0.7	1.5	0.9	3.2	0.6
24–25 Aug	Termometro Politico	5,300	10.7	23.3	14.3	7.2	24.7	2.5	1.9	4.8	2.5	0.8	1.2	1.5	4.6	1.4
23–24 Aug	Tecnè	2,000	10.5	22.6	12.7	11.1	24.6	3.3	2.5	4.9	2.9	0.6	1.2		3.1	2.0
22–24 Aug	Demopolis	1,408	11.0	22.6	14.5	7.0	24.0	3.7		5.8	3.1				8.3	1.4
10–23 Aug	Lab2101	1,500	10.6	26.1	16.9	5.6	22.5	3.0	1.4	6.9		1.6	3.0		2.4	3.6
20 Aug	Noto	1,000	12.5	20.5	12.5	7.5	25.0	2.7	1.3	7.5	2.3	1.0	2.5		4.7	4.5
13–20 Aug	Lab2101	1,000	10.1	25.6	16.7	5.4	22.3	3.3	1.8	6.7		1.7	3.3		3.1	3.3
19 Aug	Piepoli	–	10.5	22.0	13.0	7.5	24.0	3.5	2.0	6.5	3.0	1.5			6.0	2.0
17–18 Aug	BiDiMedia	2,107	10.0	24.2	13.6	7.0	24.0	3.9	2.1	5.2	2.4	0.9	1.8	0.9	4.0	0.2
17–18 Aug	Tecnè	1,506	10.2	23.5	12.9	11.4	24.3	3.7	2.8	4.8	2.7		1.2		2.5	0.8
16–18 Aug	Termometro Politico	4,900	11.1	23.5	14.3	7.3	24.3	2.6	1.9	4.9	2.4	0.7	1.0	1.5	4.5	0.8
17 Aug	Noto	1,000	12.5	21.5	12.5	7.5	24.5	2.5	1.5	7.5		1.5	2.5		6.0	3.0
11–14 Aug	GDC	1,379	10.7	25.9	12.3	7.5	23.4	3.4	2.2	5.1	3.1	0.9	3.2		2.3	2.5
12 Aug	Enzo Risso	–	12.8	24.7	14.7	7.5	22.2	3.1	2.0	4.3	3.2	0.8	0.9		3.9	2.5
6–12 Aug	Lab2101	1,000	10.0	25.3	16.3	5.6	22.1	3.4	2.0	6.5		1.8	3.6		3.4	3.2
10–11 Aug	Demopolis	1,206	10.6	22.8	15.2	6.8	24.3	4.1		5.3	2.6				8.3	1.5
8–11 Aug	Tecnè	4,002	9.8	23.8	13.0	11.4	24.2	3.8	3.0	4.7	2.6		1.1		2.6	0.4
8–9 Aug	EMG	–	10.0	24.0	12.5	8.0	24.0	3.0	3.0	6.0		1.5	3.5		4.5	Tie
5–7 Aug	Quorum – YouTrend	1,000	10.6	22.3	14.0	8.9	24.2	3.9	1.6	4.2	3.2	1.5	1.1	0.7	3.8	1.9

Fieldwork date	Polling firm	Sample size	M5S	PD	Lega	FI	FdI	Art.1	SI	EV	+E–A	IV	Italexit	IC (Note: Polls before 1 August 2022 refer to it as Together for the Future (IpF).)	Others	Lead
3–8 Aug	SWG	1,200	10.4	23.3	12.5	8.0	23.8	w. PD	3.7		6.5	2.9	3.3	1.4	4.2	0.5
4–6 Aug	BiDiMedia	4,152	9.6	24.4	13.3	6.7	24.2	w. PD	4.0		5.8	2.2	2.2	0.8	6.8	0.2
5 Aug	Lab2101	1,000	10.1	22.0	17.2	5.4	21.8	1.9	3.7		5.8	3.1	2.1	2.4	4.5	0.2
4 Aug	Tecnè	800	9.5	24.0	13.4	10.9	24.2	w. PD	3.9		4.9	2.9	2.7		3.6	0.2
3 Aug	BiDiMedia	1,213	9.7	24.5	13.5	6.4	24.3	w. PD	4.1		6.0	2.0	2.3	1.0	6.2	0.2
29 Jul–2 Aug	Demos & Pi	1,000	11.3	22.1	13.2	8.3	23.4	2.5	3.6		5.3	2.8	2.7		4.8	1.3
27 Jul–1 Aug	SWG	1,200	10.0	23.7	12.0	7.5	24.2	w. PD	4.1		6.8	2.8	3.2	1.7	4.0	0.5
29–31 Jul	Quorum – YouTrend	1,000	9.9	23.4	13.5	8.0	24.2	w. PD	4.0		5.2	2.6	2.6	1.8	4.8	0.8
30 Jul	Noto	1,000	11.0	20.0	13.0	7.0	24.0	w. PD	1.0		7.0	3.0	2.5	2.5	9.0	4.0
29–30 Jul	Ipsos	1,000	11.3	23.2	13.5	9.0	23.3	1.5	3.4		3.6	2.3	3.1	1.3	4.5	0.1
28 Jul	Tecnè	1,000	9.4	24.2	13.9	10.8	23.8	w. PD	4.1		4.9	2.9	2.6		3.4	0.4
26–28 Jul	Termometro Politico	4,300	11.3	23.0	14.7	7.2	24.3	w. PD	2.5		4.6	2.4	2.0		8.0	1.3
27 Jul	EMG	1,000	10.5	24.5	12.5	7.0	22.5	w. PD	3.5		6.0	4.0	2.5	1.5	5.5	2.0
26 Jul	Piepoli	–	10.5	22.5	14.5	7.5	23.0	2.0	2.0	2.5	5.0	2.5	2.0	2.5	3.5	0.5
21–25 Jul	SWG	1,200	10.1	23.2	12.4	7.1	25.0	2.2	3.6		6.0	2.9	2.8	1.5	3.2	1.8
21–23 Jul	BiDiMedia	1,500	10.0	23.5	14.5	6.7	23.6		4.5		4.8	2.1	2.0	0.8	7.5	0.1
21–23 Jul	Demopolis	2,000	9.8	22.3	14.2	6.5	23.5				3.9				19.8	1.2
22–23 Jul	Quorum – YouTrend	1,000	9.8	22.5	13.4	8.3	23.8	1.6	4.2		4.9	1.8	2.0	2.6	5.1	1.3
22 Jul	Euromedia	1,000	9.2	22.8	14.0	7.7	23.5	1.4	3.2		5.1	3.1	2.7	1.5	5.8	0.7
21 Jul	Tecnè	800	9.4	23.1	14.6	10.6	23.5		4.1		4.9	2.8	2.5		4.5	0.4
20–21 Jul	Termometro Politico	3,900	11.9	22.7	15.4	7.6	23.7	w. PD	2.6		4.3	2.5	2.4		7.0	1.0
20–21 Jul	Lab2101	1,000	10.3	22.1	16.8	5.8	21.8	1.9	1.7	1.4	5.4	3.2		3.8	5.8	0.3
19 Jul	Piepoli	–	11.0	22.0	15.0	8.0	22.5	2.0	2.0	2.5	5.0	2.5	2.0	2.0	3.5	0.5
13–18 Jul	SWG	1,200	11.2	22.1	14.0	7.4	23.8	2.3	3.8		4.9	2.7	2.5		5.3	1.7
17 Jul	Piepoli	–	11.5	21.5	14.5	7.5	22.0	1.5	2.0		4.5	3.0	2.5		9.5	0.5
15–16 Jul	Euromedia	1,000	10.7	21.8	14.6	8.6	22.0	1.3	3.1		4.5	2.6	2.3	1.6	6.9	0.2
15 Jul	Tecnè	1,000	9.7	23.0	14.5	10.3	23.2		4.4		4.9	2.7	2.6		4.7	0.2
13–14 Jul	Termometro Politico	3,400	12.4	22.3	16.0	7.9	23.0	w. PD	2.6		4.3	2.3	2.2		7.0	0.7
11–14 Jul	BiDiMedia	2,000	10.2	22.3	14.2	7.2	22.9	1.4	4.0		4.7	2.0	2.3	0.7	7.6	0.6
6–11 Jul	SWG	1,200	11.5	21.7	14.5	7.8	23.5	2.2	3.9		5.1	2.6	2.2		5.0	1.8
8 Jul	Tecnè	1,000	9.5	22.9	14.4	10.1	23.4		2.2	2.3	5.0	2.8	2.7		4.7	0.5
6–7 Jul	Termometro Politico	3,200	12.5	22.0	16.3	7.7	23.1	w. PD	3.0		4.3	2.4	2.4		6.3	1.1
29 Jun–4 Jul	SWG	1,200	11.2	21.8	14.3	7.4	23.6	2.5	2.7	2.6	5.2	2.4	2.2		4.1	1.8
4 Jul	Euromedia	1,000	11.3	21.4	14.5	8.3	22.3	1.4	3.0		4.8	2.3	2.6		8.1	0.9
30 Jun–1 Jul	Tecnè	1,000	9.4	22.8	14.7	10.0	23.3		2.1	2.2	5.2	2.9	2.6		4.8	0.5
29–30 Jun	Termometro Politico	3,300	12.6	22.2	16.6	7.6	22.8	w. PD	2.8		4.1	2.2	2.5	0.8	5.8	0.6
28–30 Jun	Ipsos	1,000	12.1	20.8	15.0	9.8	20.0	1.2	1.8	2.4	3.8	2.0	4.0	2.3	4.8	0.8
27–28 Jun	EMG	1,000	10.2	22.3	13.5	8.2	22.8	1.5	2.3	2.5	4.4	4.1	2.3	1.3	4.6	0.5
27–28 Jun	Demopolis	2,000	10.5	22.0	15.2	7.3	23.0				4.0				18.0	1.0
27 Jun	Noto	1,000	10.0	21.0	14.0	8.0	22.0	1.5	1.0	1.5	5.5	3.5	2.0	3.0	7.0	1.0
22–27 Jun	SWG	1,200	11.5	21.6	14.7	7.2	23.4	2.6	2.5	2.4	5.3	2.4	2.2		4.2	1.8
24–25 Jun	Winpoll	1,000	6.9	20.5	15.1	9.7	25.5		1.4	1.8	3.3	2.7	1.9	4.7	6.5	5.0
23–24 Jun	Tecnè	1,000	9.3	22.9	14.8	9.9	23.3		2.2	2.3	5.3	2.7	2.5		4.7	0.4
21–24 Jun	Termometro Politico	3,700	12.8	22.3	16.7	7.6	22.9	w. PD	2.9		4.2	2.2	2.2	1.0	5.2	0.6
22 Jun	Euromedia	1,000	11.0	21.8	14.8	7.5	22.5	1.5	1.7	1.8	5.4	2.5	2.8	1.0	6.7	0.7
15–20 Jun	SWG	1,200	12.5	21.3	15.1	7.4	23.1	2.4	2.6	2.2	5.4	2.6	2.4	Did not exist	3.0	1.8
16–17 Jun	Tecnè	1,000	12.3	21.5	15.2	9.8	23.0		2.0	2.0	4.9	2.6	2.3	Did not exist	4.4	1.5
15–16 Jun	Lab2101	1,000	14.2	22.9	17.5	7.0	19.4	2.2	1.8	1.2	5.2	3.1		Did not exist	5.5	3.5
15–16 Jun	Termometro Politico	3,200	12.6	22.7	16.8	7.4	23.1	w. PD	2.9		4.3	2.3	2.4	Did not exist	5.5	0.4
13–14 Jun	Euromedia	800	11.4	22.3	15.3	7.5	22.5	1.6	1.7	2.0	5.1	2.6	3.1	Did not exist	4.9	0.2
13 Jun	EMG	1,562	13.0	21.8	14.1	8.1	22.1	1.6	2.1	2.3	4.5	3.7	2.0	Did not exist	4.7	0.3
8–13 Jun	SWG	1,200	12.9	21.2	15.0	7.6	22.8	2.5	2.3	2.4	5.1	2.5	2.4	Did not exist	3.3	1.6
12 Jun	Noto	1,000	11.5	19.0	15.0	8.0	22.5	1.5	1.0	1.5	5.5	3.5	2.5	Did not exist	8.5	3.5
25–26 May	Termometro Politico	3,000	13.2	22.2	17.3	7.4	22.5	w. PD	2.8		4.2	2.3	2.6	Did not exist	5.5	0.3
25 May	Index	800	12.5	21.6	15.2	8.0	22.6	2.4	2.2	2.4	5.1	2.5	2.5	Did not exist	3.0	1.0
25 May	Euromedia	800	12.5	21.5	15.7	8.5	22.2	1.5	1.6	2.5	4.8	2.3	2.9	Did not exist	4.0	0.7
23–25 May	Ipsos	1,000	13.7	21.0	15.1	8.3	21.0	1.2	2.1	2.7	3.3	2.2	4.5	Did not exist	4.9	Tie
23–25 May	Demos & Pi	1,004	13.4	21.0	15.6	8.0	22.3	2.2	2.1	2.3	4.0	2.5		Did not exist	6.6	1.3
24 May	EMG	1,472	13.0	21.0	15.2	8.0	22.3	1.4	2.1	2.3	4.6	3.5	2.2	Did not exist	4.4	1.3
22–24 May	Demopolis	2,000	13.0	21.2	16.5	8.0	22.0	1.8	2.0	1.5	4.2	2.1	2.0	Did not exist	5.7	0.8
18–23 May	SWG	1,200	12.8	21.8	15.0	8.0	22.6	2.4	2.1	2.3	5.0	2.5	2.6	Did not exist	2.9	0.8
19 May	Tecnè	1,000	12.9	21.5	15.3	10.7	22.7		2.0	1.9	4.9	2.1	2.0	Did not exist	4.3	1.2
18–19 May	Termometro Politico	3,100	13.1	22.0	17.4	7.6	22.3	w. PD	3.0		4.1	2.5	2.5	Did not exist	5.5	0.3
18 May	Index	800	12.4	21.4	15.4	7.8	22.5	2.4	2.3	2.4	5.2	2.4	2.3	Did not exist	3.5	1.1
18 May	Piepoli	–	13.5	21.0	16.0	7.5	21.5	1.5	2.0	2.0	4.5	3.5	2.0	Did not exist	5.0	0.5
18 May	Noto	1,000	12.0	20.0	16.5	7.5	22.5	1.5	1.0	1.5	5.0	3.5	2.5	Did not exist	6.5	2.5
16 May	EMG	1,602	13.3	20.5	15.9	7.8	22.0	1.4	2.2	2.0	4.8	3.6	2.4	Did not exist	4.1	1.5
11–16 May	SWG	1,200	12.6	21.3	15.6	7.6	22.9	2.4	2.3	2.4	5.2	2.5	2.4	Did not exist	2.8	1.6
12 May	Tecnè	1,000	13.1	21.7	15.2	10.7	22.4		1.9	2.0	4.5	2.0	2.1	Did not exist	4.4	0.7
11–12 May	Termometro Politico	3,000	13.3	21.7	17.8	7.7	22.0	w. PD	2.9		4.2	2.5	2.4	Did not exist	5.5	0.3
11 May	Index	800	12.5	21.2	15.5	8.0	22.3	2.4	2.3	2.4	5.2	2.3	2.2	Did not exist	3.7	1.1
4–9 May	SWG	1,200	12.8	21.0	15.6	8.0	22.6	2.5	2.1	2.4	5.3	2.4	2.1	Did not exist	3.2	1.6
6 May	Tecnè	1,000	12.9	21.7	15.4	10.7	22.1		2.0	2.1	4.4	2.1	2.2	Did not exist	4.4	0.4
4–5 May	Termometro Politico	3,200	13.3	21.9	17.7	7.8	21.7	w. PD	3.1		4.1	2.5	2.4	Did not exist	5.5	0.2
4 May	Index	800	12.7	21.5	15.6	7.9	22.1	2.3	2.4	2.4	5.1	2.3		Did not exist	5.7	0.6
4 May	Piepoli	–	13.5	21.0	16.5	7.5	21.0	1.5	2.0	2.0	4.5	3.0	2.0	Did not exist	5.5	Tie
27 Apr–2 May	SWG	1,200	12.5	21.6	15.8	8.0	22.1	2.3	2.4	2.3	5.3	2.2	1.9	Did not exist	3.6	0.5
29 Apr	Tecnè	1,000	12.7	21.8	15.4	10.8	22.0		2.2	2.1	4.3	2.2	2.0	Did not exist	4.5	0.2
27–28 Apr	Euromedia	1,000	12.5	21.3	15.9	8.5	21.0	1.7	1.3	1.9	5.1	2.3	3.1	Did not exist	5.4	0.3
27–28 Apr	Termometro Politico	2,800	13.1	21.8	17.9	7.8	21.7	w. PD	3.4		4.2	2.4	2.2	Did not exist	5.5	0.1
26–28 Apr	Ipsos	1,000	15.0	20.5	16.5	8.8	20.0	1.0	1.5	2.2	3.5	2.5	4.2	Did not exist	4.3	0.5
26 Apr	Piepoli	–	13.0	21.0	16.5	7.5	21.5	2.0	2.0	2.0	5.0	3.0	2.0	Did not exist	4.5	0.5
20–24 Apr	SWG	1,200	12.7	21.2	15.6	8.2	21.7	2.5	2.7	2.4	5.1	2.3	2.0	Did not exist	3.6	0.5
20–23 Apr	Lab2101	1,000	14.6	22.8	18.4	7.2	18.1	2.5	2.2	1.2	5.7	2.7		Did not exist	4.6	4.4
22 Apr	Tecnè	1,000	12.6	21.7	15.6	10.8	21.9		2.1	2.2	4.5	2.3	1.9	Did not exist	4.4	0.2
20–21 Apr	Termometro Politico	3,400	13.0	21.1	17.7	8.0	21.3	3.1		1.5	4.1	2.6	2.5	Did not exist	5.1	0.2
19–20 Apr	Demopolis	1,500	13.2	21.0	16.0	8.0	21.5	1.8	2.3	1.5	4.2	2.0	2.5	Did not exist	6.0	0.5
13–19 Apr	SWG	1,200	12.9	20.8	15.6	7.8	21.8	2.7	2.6	2.5	5.0	2.5	2.2	Did not exist	3.6	1.0
13–15 Apr	Ixè	1,000	14.4	21.4	15.1	8.9	19.6	2.1	2.3	2.0	4.9	2.1		Did not exist	7.2	1.8
14 Apr	Euromedia	1,000	12.3	21.7	15.9	8.5	21.5	1.9	1.5	2.1	4.7	2.3	3.5	Did not exist	4.1	0.2
13–14 Apr	Termometro Politico	2,800	12.9	21.1	18.0	7.7	21.3	3.4		1.9	4.4	2.5	2.3	Did not exist	4.5	0.2
11–12 Apr	Demos & Pi	1,012	14.2	21.2	16.8	8.2	20.7		2.0	2.3	3.8	2.2	2.1	Did not exist	6.5	0.5
6–11 Apr	SWG	1,200	12.9	21.2	15.9	8.0	21.6	2.6	2.6	2.3	5.0	2.4	1.9	Did not exist	3.6	0.4
9 Apr	Lab2101	1,000	14.4	22.4	18.0	7.9	18.3	2.3	2.4	1.5	5.4	2.6		Did not exist	4.8	4.1
7–9 Apr	BiDiMedia	1,500	12.2	22.3	17.8	6.8	20.0	1.4	1.9	2.1	4.8	2.1	1.7	Did not exist	5.9	2.3
8 Apr	Tecnè	1,000	12.7	21.9	15.8	10.8	21.9		1.9	2.2	4.4	2.4		Did not exist	6.0	Tie
6–7 Apr	Termometro Politico	3,200	13.0	20.8	18.1	7.9	21.4	3.4		1.9	4.3	2.5	2.4	Did not exist	4.3	0.6
4–5 Apr	Noto	1,000	13.5	19.5	18.0	7.0	21.0	1.5	1.0	1.5	4.0	3.0	2.0	Did not exist	8.0	1.5
30 Mar–4 Apr	SWG	1,200	13.3	21.4	15.8	7.7	21.6	2.8	2.4	2.3	5.3	2.2	2.1	Did not exist	3.1	0.2
1 Apr	Tecnè	1,000	12.5	21.7	15.8	10.7	21.8		2.0	2.3	4.7	2.6		Did not exist	5.9	0.1
30–31 Mar	Euromedia	1,000	14.0	20.8	15.7	8.0	21.0	1.8	1.7	2.1	4.7	2.6	3.3	Did not exist	4.3	0.2
30–31 Mar	Termometro Politico	3,500	13.2	20.9	18.4	7.7	21.2	3.3		1.7	4.3	2.7	2.3	Did not exist	4.3	0.3
28 Mar	Euromedia	1,000	13.0	20.9	16.1	8.0	21.3	1.7	1.5	1.4	4.3	2.4	2.5	Did not exist	6.1	0.4
23–28 Mar	SWG	1,200	13.4	21.1	16.0	7.9	21.6	2.6	2.5	2.5	5.4	2.4	1.8	Did not exist	3.0	0.5
25 Mar	Tecnè	1,000	12.3	21.6	15.9	10.7	21.8		2.0	2.4	4.8	2.7		Did not exist	5.8	0.2
22–25 Mar	Ixè	1,000	14.1	23.2	16.3	8.5	17.8	2.3	2.8	2.1	5.3	1.6		Did not exist	6.0	5.4
23–24 Mar	Termometro Politico	3,000	13.0	21.1	18.1	7.7	21.5	3.5		1.7	4.2	2.6	2.3	Did not exist	4.3	0.4
22–24 Mar	Ipsos	1,000	14.5	20.9	17.5	8.1	21.5	1.0	1.6	2.0	3.6	2.1	2.3	Did not exist	4.9	0.6
22 Mar	Euromedia	800	12.5	21.6	16.3	8.1	21.4	1.8	1.6	2.0	4.8	2.5	2.3	Did not exist	5.1	0.2
16–21 Mar	SWG	1,200	12.9	21.6	16.4	7.8	21.8	2.4	2.2	2.3	5.2	2.2	2.0	Did not exist	3.2	0.2
18 Mar	Tecnè	1,000	12.4	21.4	15.9	10.7	21.7		2.1	2.3	4.9	2.9		Did not exist	5.7	0.3
15–17 Mar	Termometro Politico	3,200	13.2	20.8	18.1	7.8	21.7	3.4		1.8	4.2	2.6	2.2	Did not exist	4.2	0.9
9–14 Mar	SWG	1,200	13.0	21.3	16.2	8.0	21.9	2.5	2.1	2.0	5.2	2.5	2.2	Did not exist	3.1	0.6
11–12 Mar	Euromedia	1,000	13.4	22.0	15.8	7.7	20.3	2.0	1.5	1.8	5.0	2.0	2.9	Did not exist	5.6	1.7
11 Mar	Tecnè	1,000	12.3	21.2	16.1	10.6	21.6		2.3	2.4	5.0	3.0		Did not exist	5.5	0.4
9 Mar	Lab2101	587	14.6	22.1	17.9	7.7	18.9	2.5	2.2	1.3	5.4	3.0		Did not exist	4.4	3.2
5–9 Mar	Ixè	1,000	14.9	23.2	17.0	9.5	17.6	2.2	2.1	2.3	5.2	1.7		Did not exist	4.3	5.6
8 Mar	Noto	1,000	12.0	20.0	17.0	7.0	21.0	1.5	1.0	2.0	4.0	3.0	1.5	Did not exist	10.0	1.0
2–7 Mar	SWG	1,200	12.6	21.2	17.0	8.1	21.5	2.4	2.1	2.2	4.8	2.3	2.0	Did not exist	3.8	0.3
4 Mar	Tecnè	1,000	12.4	21.5	16.3	10.4	21.5		2.4	2.5	4.8	2.8		Did not exist	5.4	Tie
2–4 Mar	Demos & Pi	1,015	14.8	21.3	17.6	7.8	21.0			2.4	4.9	2.5	2.0	Did not exist	5.7	0.3
2–3 Mar	Termometro Politico	3,400	13.4	20.9	18.6	7.9	21.3	3.3		1.9	4.2	2.5		Did not exist	6.0	0.4
23–28 Feb	SWG	1,200	13.0	21.1	17.2	7.6	21.3	2.2	2.1	2.5	5.0	2.7	1.7	Did not exist	3.6	0.2
25 Feb	Tecnè	1,000	12.5	22.2	16.3	10.4	21.8		2.1	2.2	4.5	2.8		Did not exist	5.2	0.4
22–24 Feb	Ipsos	1,000	15.4	21.0	18.0	8.9	19.7	1.2	1.8	2.0	3.3	2.1	2.1	Did not exist	4.5	1.3
22–24 Feb	Termometro Politico	3,100	13.7	20.5	19.0	7.7	21.6	3.2		1.8	4.2	2.6		Did not exist	5.7	1.1
22–23 Feb	Demopolis	1,500	13.4	21.5	17.5	7.5	21.2				3.8			Did not exist	15.1	0.3
21 Feb	EMG	1,568	13.7	21.4	17.9	8.3	19.5	1.3	2.6	2.7	4.1	4.1		Did not exist	4.4	1.9
16–21 Feb	SWG	1,200	13.1	20.7	16.8	7.8	21.4	2.4	2.3	2.7	5.1	2.4	2.0	Did not exist	3.3	0.7
18 Feb	Tecnè	1,000	12.8	21.7	16.5	10.2	22.0		2.2	2.3	4.4	2.6		Did not exist	5.3	0.3
16–18 Feb	Ixè	1,000	15.6	23.1	16.6	9.2	17.9	1.9	2.2	1.9	5.0	2.0		Did not exist	4.6	5.2
15–17 Feb	Termometro Politico	3,200	13.9	20.7	18.7	7.9	21.8	3.2		1.7	4.0	2.7		Did not exist	5.4	1.1
16 Feb	Euromedia	1,121	13.7	21.2	16.9	8.5	21.0	1.9	1.6	3.2	4.8	2.3	2.0	Did not exist	1.9	0.2
15 Feb	Piepoli	–	14.5	21.0	18.5	8.0	19.5	1.5	1.5	1.5	6.0	2.5	1.5	Did not exist	4.0	1.5
9–14 Feb	SWG	1,200	12.8	21.1	17.0	8.0	21.4	2.6	2.2	2.4	4.7	2.5	1.7	Did not exist	3.6	0.3
7–12 Feb	BiDiMedia	3,015	13.1	21.8	17.8	7.1	19.6	1.4	2.1	2.0	4.9	2.2	1.6	Did not exist	6.4	2.2
11 Feb	Tecnè	1,000	12.8	21.6	16.7	10.0	21.9		2.3	2.4	4.6	2.5		Did not exist	5.2	0.3
9–10 Feb	Noto	1,000	12.5	20.5	18.0	8.0	20.0	1.0	1.5	1.5	3.0	3.0	1.5	Did not exist	9.5	0.5
9–10 Feb	Termometro Politico	3,600	14.4	20.5	18.9	7.6	21.7	3.2		1.8	4.1	2.7		Did not exist	5.1	1.2
8–10 Feb	Quorum – YouTrend	802	16.2	20.8	15.5	8.3	20.1	2.4	2.7	2.2	3.7	2.3	2.8	Did not exist	3.0	0.7
8 Feb	EMG	1,518	13.8	21.1	18.0	8.0	19.6	1.4	2.4	2.5	4.2	4.1		Did not exist	4.8	1.5
2–7 Feb	SWG	1,200	13.3	21.5	17.1	7.8	21.1	2.5	2.4	2.5	4.4	2.1	2.0	Did not exist	3.3	0.4
2–3 Feb	Termometro Politico	3,600	14.4	20.5	18.7	7.5	21.9	3.1		1.8	4.0	2.7		Did not exist	5.4	1.4
1–3 Feb	Ipsos	1,000	15.5	20.8	18.0	9.8	19.3	1.0	1.9	1.8	3.9	2.2	1.9	Did not exist	3.9	1.5
1–3 Feb	Demopolis	1,500	14.2	21.5	18.0	7.5	20.6				3.4			Did not exist	14.8	0.9
2 Feb	Tecnè	1,000	13.1	21.4	17.1	8.8	21.9		2.4	2.3	4.8	2.8		Did not exist	5.4	0.5
2 Feb	Index	800	13.2	21.8	16.8	7.8	20.9	2.2	2.5	2.5	5.1	2.9		Did not exist	4.3	0.9
31 Jan–1 Feb	Demos & Pi	1,037	15.6	20.8	17.4	7.6	20.5		2.0	2.2	4.3	2.4	2.1	Did not exist	5.1	0.3
31 Jan	EMG	1,463	14.2	21.0	18.2	7.9	19.4	1.3	2.3	2.4	4.4	4.2		Did not exist	4.7	1.6
31 Jan	Euromedia	1,000	14.2	20.8	16.7	7.4	21.1	2.2	2.1	2.4	4.1	3.0		Did not exist	6.0	0.3
28–31 Jan	Ixè	1,000	15.1	21.2	17.2	8.6	18.5	2.0	2.1	2.3	5.7	2.3		Did not exist	5.0	2.7
26–31 Jan	SWG	1,200	13.8	21.2	17.5	7.3	20.5	2.6	2.6	2.8	4.5	2.2	2.1	Did not exist	2.9	0.7
26–27 Jan	Termometro Politico	3,300	14.7	20.6	19.1	7.7	21.0	3.1		1.7	4.0	2.7		Did not exist	5.4	0.4
25 Jan	Piepoli	–	14.5	21.0	18.5	7.5	20.5	2.0	2.0		5.5	2.5		Did not exist	6.0	0.5
19–24 Jan	SWG	1,200	13.5	21.7	18.4	7.7	19.8	2.5	2.5	2.8	4.8	2.3	1.6	Did not exist	2.4	1.9
21 Jan	Tecnè	1,000	13.7	20.5	18.5	9.3	20.6		2.5	2.2	4.9	2.3		Did not exist	5.5	0.1
18–20 Jan	Termometro Politico	3,300	14.8	20.5	18.9	7.2	21.2	3.1		1.6	5.0	2.5		Did not exist	5.2	0.7
17–20 Jan	Quorum – YouTrend	804	16.6	21.4	17.9	9.3	19.1	1.0	2.1	1.5	4.5	2.5		Did not exist	4.1	2.3
19 Jan	Index	800	14.1	22.3	18.5	7.5	19.3	2.3	2.5	2.4	5.2	2.6		Did not exist	3.3	3.0
19 Jan	Euromedia	800	14.4	21.6	18.5	8.2	18.9	2.1	1.9	2.1	4.8	2.3		Did not exist	5.2	2.7
12–17 Jan	SWG	1,200	13.7	21.6	18.8	7.4	20.0	2.3	2.6	2.6	4.8	2.4	1.5	Did not exist	2.3	1.6
12–15 Jan	BiDiMedia	2,675	14.2	21.6	19.0	6.9	18.5	1.4	1.9	1.7	5.4	1.7	1.2	Did not exist	6.5	2.6
14 Jan	Tecnè	1,000	14.3	20.7	18.3	9.2	20.5		2.3	2.1	4.8	2.2		Did not exist	5.6	0.2
11–13 Jan	Termometro Politico	3,400	15.2	20.4	18.8	7.3	21.1	2.9		1.6	5.1	2.5		Did not exist	5.1	0.7
12 Jan	Index	800	14.4	22.1	18.6	7.8	19.5	2.2	2.4	2.3	5.5	2.4		Did not exist	2.8	2.6
11–12 Jan	Noto	1,000	14.0	19.5	18.0	8.5	20.0	1.0	1.0	1.0	4.0	2.5		Did not exist	10.5	0.5
8–10 Jan	Euromedia	1,000	14.8	21.5	18.9	8.8	18.5	2.3	1.5	1.7	6.3	2.2		Did not exist	3.5	2.6
5–10 Jan	SWG	1,200	14.0	22.2	19.0	7.8	19.9	2.4	2.3	2.4	5.7	2.1	1.1	Did not exist	1.1	2.3

=== 2021 ===
Fieldwork date	Polling firm	Sample size	M5S	PD	Lega	FI	FdI	Art.1	SI	+E	EV	A	IV	CI	Others	Lead
21–23 Dec	Termometro Politico	3,200	14.9	20.0	19.2	7.3	21.3	2.9		1.5	1.8	3.5	2.7		3.9	1.3
20–22 Dec	Demos & Pi	917	16.0	20.7	18.8	7.9	20.1		2.3	2.2		3.0	2.1		6.9	0.6
20–22 Dec	Ipsos	1,000	16.4	20.7	20.1	8.7	18.8	1.3	1.7	2.0	1.7	2.0	1.8		4.8	0.6
21 Dec	EMG	1,463	14.7	20.5	18.5	7.6	19.4	1.7	2.2	1.3	2.4	3.6	4.3	1.2	2.6	1.1
20 Dec	Euromedia	800	15.7	21.3	17.8	8.7	19.5	2.4	1.6	2.1	1.6	3.8	2.0		3.5	1.8
16–20 Dec	Ixè	1,000	16.4	22.4	19.1	9.2	17.4	2.0	1.6	1.4	1.4	3.4	1.6		4.1	3.3
15–20 Dec	SWG	1,200	13.9	22.2	19.6	7.4	19.7	2.2	2.5	1.5	2.6	4.0	2.2	1.0	1.2	2.5
17 Dec	Tecnè	1,000	14.4	21.7	18.4	8.8	20.6	1.7	2.0	1.6	1.9	3.0	2.1		3.8	1.1
14–16 Dec	Demopolis	2,000	15.0	21.4	19.0	7.3	21.0	2.1	2.0		1.9	3.2	1.8		5.3	0.4
14–16 Dec	Termometro Politico	3,200	14.9	20.1	19.5	7.1	21.1	3.0		1.5	1.7	3.6	2.6		4.9	1.0
13–16 Dec	BiDiMedia	2,391	15.0	21.3	18.9	6.8	18.8	1.4	1.8	1.4	1.9	3.5	1.7	0.7	6.8	2.4
7–13 Dec	SWG	1,200	14.3	22.1	19.0	7.7	20.2	2.3	2.2	1.5	2.5	3.8	2.1		2.3	1.9
10 Dec	Tecnè	1,000	15.1	20.9	18.2	8.7	20.4	1.6	2.1	1.7	1.8	3.2	2.4		3.9	0.5
7–9 Dec	Index	800	15.4	21.2	18.4	7.7	19.3	2.2	2.3	1.6	2.3	4.1	2.5	1.0	2.0	1.9
5–6 Dec	Euromedia	800	15.8	20.9	18.0	8.3	19.3	1.8	1.3	1.5	1.4	4.2	2.3		5.2	1.6
1–6 Dec	SWG	1,200	15.1	21.5	18.5	7.3	19.8	2.2	2.3	1.9	2.3	4.0	2.5		2.6	1.7
5 Dec	Quorum – YouTrend	–	15.8	20.2	17.8	7.0	19.9	4.3		2.1	2.8	2.5	2.6		5.0	0.3
3 Dec	Tecnè	1,000	15.4	20.4	18.4	8.5	20.4	1.8	2.0	1.6	1.9	3.4	2.5		3.7	Tie
1–2 Dec	Termometro Politico	3,200	15.2	20.3	19.2	7.3	21.2	2.8		1.5	1.7	3.4	2.6		4.8	0.9
1 Dec	Noto	1,000	15.0	20.5	17.5	7.5	20.5	1.0	1.0	0.5	1.5	4.5	2.5	1.0	5.5	Tie
30 Nov–1 Dec	Index	800	15.7	20.8	18.3	7.6	19.4	2.1	2.4	1.7	2.2	4.1	2.5	1.0	2.2	1.4
30 Nov	EMG	1,394	15.2	19.7	18.4	7.2	19.7	1.7	2.3	1.2	2.3	3.4	4.3	1.4	1.6	Tie
29–30 Nov	Demopolis	1,800	15.8	21.0	19.2	7.4	20.3	2.0	2.1			2.8	1.9		7.5	0.7
29 Nov	EMG	1,575	15.3	19.7	18.5	7.2	19.6	1.7	2.3	1.2	2.4	3.4	4.2	1.4	1.6	0.1
24–29 Nov	SWG	1,200	15.7	21.1	18.8	7.0	19.4	2.0	2.5	1.7	2.2	4.2	2.7		2.7	1.7
26 Nov	Tecnè	1,000	15.9	20.3	18.3	7.7	19.9	2.1	2.1	1.5	2.1	3.7	2.4		4.0	0.4
23–25 Nov	Ipsos	1,000	15.5	20.8	19.1	8.5	19.8	0.9	1.9	2.3	1.9	2.3	2.0		5.0	1.0
22–25 Nov	BiDiMedia	5,942	15.4	21.4	18.8	7.0	19.2	1.5	2.0	1.3	1.7	3.4	1.8	0.8	5.7	2.2
24 Nov	Index	800	15.8	20.5	18.2	7.7	19.5	2.2	2.3	1.6	2.2	4.0	2.2	1.0	2.8	1.0
23 Nov	EMG	1,382	15.4	19.6	18.5	7.1	19.6	1.7	2.3	1.2	2.3	3.4	4.3	1.4	1.7	Tie
17–22 Nov	SWG	1,200	15.7	20.8	18.4	6.8	19.8	2.2	2.5	2.1	2.4	4.0	2.4	1.0	1.9	1.0
19 Nov	Tecnè	1,000	16.1	20.3	18.4	7.6	19.9	2.0	2.0	1.6	2.0	3.8	2.3		4.0	0.4
16–18 Nov	Winpoll	1,000	11.0	22.8	21.7	10.3	19.1	2.0		1.2	1.6	3.4	2.7	0.4	3.8	1.1
16–18 Nov	Termometro Politico	3,200	15.8	19.7	19.5	7.1	20.7	2.9		1.6	1.5	3.4	2.9		3.9	1.0
17 Nov	Euromedia	800	16.2	20.5	18.1	8.0	19.0	2.0	1.6	1.8	1.7	4.0	2.2		4.9	1.5
17 Nov	Index	800	15.7	20.0	18.3	7.8	19.2	2.2	2.3	1.5	2.2	4.1	2.0	1.0	3.7	0.8
16 Nov	EMG	1,478	15.3	19.6	18.5	7.0	19.4	1.8	2.3	1.3	2.2	3.6	4.2	1.4	3.4	0.2
15 Nov	EMG	1,625	15.3	19.7	18.8	7.0	19.2	1.7	2.3	1.3	2.3	3.5	4.1	1.4	3.3	0.5
15 Nov	Piepoli	–	16.5	20.5	18.5	7.0	19.0	2.5		2.0		4.0	2.5		7.5	1.5
10–15 Nov	SWG	1,200	16.1	20.3	18.7	6.9	20.2	2.4	2.5	1.9	2.1	3.9	2.2	1.0	1.8	0.1
8–14 Nov	Lab2101	1,000	15.9	20.7	19.8	7.1	18.3	4.1		1.8	1.2	4.0	2.6		4.5	0.9
12 Nov	Tecnè	1,000	16.2	20.4	18.4	7.5	20.0	2.1	2.0	1.5	2.0	3.9	2.2		3.8	0.4
10 Nov	Index	800	16.0	20.2	18.4	7.7	19.0	2.1	2.3	1.6	2.2	4.0	2.1	1.1	3.3	1.2
8–10 Nov	Demos & Pi	1,015	16.1	20.4	18.4	8.3	19.8		2.0	2.5	2.1	3.0	2.3		5.1	0.6
9 Nov	EMG	1,428	15.2	19.7	18.5	7.1	19.2	1.8	2.4	1.3	2.1	3.8	4.2	1.4	3.3	0.5
5–8 Nov	Ixè	1,000	18.0	21.0	18.8	8.3	18.0	2.1	2.0	1.3	1.5	3.9	1.9		3.2	2.2
3–8 Nov	SWG	1,200	16.4	20.5	18.8	7.0	20.0	2.3	2.2	1.9	2.3	4.0	2.1	1.0	1.5	0.5
5 Nov	Tecnè	1,000	16.0	20.3	18.5	7.6	20.3	2.0	1.9	1.6	2.0	3.7	2.3		3.8	Tie
3–4 Nov	Noto	1,000	15.5	20.0	17.0	7.5	20.5	1.0	1.0	1.0	1.5	4.5	3.0	1.5	6.0	0.5
2–4 Nov	Termometro Politico	3,400	15.4	19.9	19.7	7.2	20.9	3.0		1.6	1.6	3.2	2.6		4.9	1.0
3 Nov	Index	800	16.0	19.8	18.5	7.6	19.1	2.1	2.3	1.7	2.1	4.1	2.1	1.0	3.6	0.7
2 Nov	Euromedia	800	16.0	19.4	18.0	7.9	18.8	1.7	1.4	1.5	2.5	4.0	2.2		6.5	0.6
1–2 Nov	EMG	1,542	15.0	19.4	18.2	7.3	19.5	1.8	2.4	1.4	2.2	3.7	4.1	1.5	3.5	0.1
27–31 Oct	SWG	1,200	16.3	20.1	19.0	7.2	20.3	2.5	2.3	1.8	2.1	4.1	1.7		2.6	0.2
29 Oct	Tecnè	1,000	15.9	20.1	18.6	7.6	20.5	2.1	1.9	1.5	1.8	3.8	2.3		3.9	0.4
28 Oct	Piepoli	–	16.0	20.5	18.5	7.5	19.0	2.5		2.0		4.0	2.5		7.5	1.5
26–28 Oct	Termometro Politico	3,300	15.5	20.1	19.9	7.2	20.6	3.0		1.5	1.6	3.2	2.5		4.9	0.5
27 Oct	Index	800	16.2	19.9	18.7	7.5	19.2	2.0	2.3	1.6	2.0	4.0	2.1	1.0	4.8	0.7
25–27 Oct	Demopolis	2,000	16.8	20.5	19.0	6.7	20.5	2.0	1.9			3.2	1.8		7.6	Tie
20–25 Oct	SWG	1,200	16.6	19.7	19.2	6.8	20.7	2.5	2.4	1.9	1.9	4.1	2.0		2.2	1.0
22 Oct	Tecnè	1,000	15.6	20.0	18.9	7.5	20.7	2.0	1.9	1.5	1.7	3.9	2.4		3.9	0.7
19–21 Oct	Ipsos	1,000	16.5	20.7	20.0	8.0	18.8	1.2	2.0	2.0	2.0	2.0	2.0		4.8	0.7
19–21 Oct	Termometro Politico	3,400	15.5	20.3	19.7	7.0	20.9	2.8		1.5	1.5	3.4	2.5		4.9	0.6
20 Oct	Euromedia	800	16.2	19.5	17.6	8.1	19.2	1.5	1.4	1.2	2.1	4.5	2.0		6.7	0.3
19–20 Oct	EMG	1,572	14.9	19.0	17.8	7.6	20.0	1.9	2.2	1.5	2.0	4.0	4.1	1.6	3.4	1.0
18–19 Oct	Noto	1,000	16.0	19.5	17.5	7.5	20.5	1.5	1.0	1.0	1.5	3.5	3.0	1.5	6.0	1.0
18–19 Oct	EMG	1,425	14.8	19.0	17.9	7.7	20.0	1.8	2.1	1.5	2.0	3.9	4.1	1.6	3.6	1.0
13–18 Oct	SWG	1,200	16.4	19.2	19.4	7.0	21.1	2.9	2.2	1.6	1.8	3.9	2.1		2.4	1.7
13–16 Oct	Demopolis	8,860	15.8	20.2	19.6	6.5	20.5	2.0				3.0			12.4	0.2
12–14 Oct	Termometro Politico	3,600	15.8	19.9	19.8	6.8	21.2	2.8		1.4	1.5	3.5	2.8		4.8	1.3
11–14 Oct	Lab2101	1,000	15.9	19.7	20.8	6.9	18.8	3.9		1.7	1.5	3.8	2.7		4.3	1.1
6–11 Oct	SWG	1,200	16.9	19.0	19.2	7.1	20.7	2.6	2.4	1.6	1.8	4.1	2.3		2.3	1.5
3–7 Oct	BiDiMedia	1,895	16.0	21.0	19.2	6.5	19.7	1.5	2.0	1.2	1.5	3.3	1.6	0.9	5.6	1.3
2–3 Oct	BiDiMedia	1,365	16.3	20.6	19.3	6.8	19.6	1.5	2.0	1.2	1.4	3.1	1.6	0.8	5.8	1.0
14–17 Sep	Ixè	1,000	18.0	19.4	19.3	7.9	18.2	2.5	2.2	1.5	1.7	3.0	1.2		5.1	0.1
14–16 Sep	Termometro Politico	3,200	16.0	19.5	20.4	6.7	21.0	2.9		1.7	1.4	3.0	2.6		4.8	0.6
12–15 Sep	Noto	1,000	17.5	18.5	18.5	7.0	20.0	1.5	1.0	1.0	1.0	2.5	3.0	1.5	7.0	1.5
14 Sep	EMG	1,521	16.1	18.6	19.5	7.0	20.4	2.0	2.0	1.5	2.0	3.5	3.3	1.6	2.5	0.9
14 Sep	Euromedia	800	17.1	19.4	18.5	7.3	19.1	1.5	1.8	1.7	2.0	3.8	2.8		5.0	0.3
8–13 Sep	SWG	1,200	15.8	18.7	20.0	7.2	21.0	2.6	2.5	2.0	2.2	3.4	2.5	1.0	1.1	1.0
10 Sep	Tecnè	1,000	16.3	19.1	19.7	8.2	21.0	1.7	1.9	1.7	1.5	3.5	2.0		3.4	1.3
7–9 Sep	Termometro Politico	3,200	16.0	19.2	20.3	7.0	21.1	2.9		1.6	1.4	2.8	2.8		4.9	0.8
7–9 Sep	Ipsos	1,000	17.0	20.0	20.5	8.2	18.8	1.0	2.0	2.1	1.3	2.0	2.2			0.5
7–8 Sep	EMG	1,478	16.2	18.7	19.6	7.1	20.3	1.8	1.8	1.5	1.8	3.6	3.3	1.6	2.7	0.6
1–6 Sep	SWG	1,200	16.0	18.4	20.4	6.9	21.0	2.4	2.4	1.8	1.9	3.7	2.6	1.0	3.3	0.6
3 Sep	Tecnè	1,000	16.1	19.2	19.5	8.3	21.0	1.8	2.0	1.7	1.7	3.3	2.1		3.3	1.5
2 Sep	Euromedia	1,000	16.3	19.0	19.4	7.1	20.0	1.7	1.8	1.6	1.5	4.2	2.3		5.1	0.6
1–2 Sep	Demos & Pi	1,014	16.6	19.3	19.6	7.7	20.8		2.3	2.0	2.2	2.5	2.6		4.4	1.2
31 Aug–2 Sep	Termometro Politico	2,900	15.6	19.5	20.6	6.7	21.2	2.8		1.8	1.4	3.0	2.8		4.6	0.6
25–30 Aug	SWG	1,200	16.3	19.1	19.8	7.0	20.6	2.3	2.7	2.0	1.6	3.7	2.4	1.0	1.5	0.8
15 Aug	Lab2101	1,000	16.2	19.3	21.9	7.1	19.1	3.6		1.4	1.4	3.5	3.0		3.5	2.6
4–5 Aug	Termometro Politico	3,200	16.0	19.5	20.6	6.5	20.9	2.8		1.7	1.4	2.8	2.9		4.9	0.3
2–3 Aug	Demopolis	1,200	16.6	19.5	20.8	7.0	21.0	2.2	1.9			2.6	1.7		6.7	0.2
28 Jul–2 Aug	SWG	1,200	15.5	19.0	20.3	6.8	20.6	2.3	2.7	1.8	2.0	3.9	2.2	1.1	1.8	0.3
28–29 Jul	Termometro Politico	3,200	15.9	19.8	20.4	6.2	20.8	3.1		1.5	1.5	3.0	2.9		4.9	0.4
27 Jul	Euromedia	1,000	15.5	19.5	19.8	8.2	20.0	1.8	1.6	1.6	1.2	3.4	2.5			0.2
21–26 Jul	SWG	1,200	15.8	18.8	20.0	7.1	20.3	2.4	2.5	2.0	1.8	3.8	2.3	1.1	2.1	0.3
20–24 Jul	BiDiMedia	1,874	15.0	20.3	20.2	6.8	19.4	1.8	1.9	1.2	1.5	3.0	2.0	1.1	5.8	0.1
23 Jul	Tecnè	1,000	15.0	19.6	20.1	8.8	20.9	1.9	1.9	1.6	1.6	3.4	2.0		3.2	0.8
22–23 Jul	Euromedia	1,000	15.2	19.1	20.1	7.8	20.2	1.9	1.7	1.8	1.6	3.3	2.1		5.2	0.1
21–22 Jul	Ixè	1,000	17.3	19.2	19.9	8.4	19.0	2.7	2.0	1.6	1.1	3.1	1.2	1.2	3.3	0.7
20–22 Jul	Ipsos	1,000	17.1	20.9	21.1	7.0	19.0	1.2	2.0	2.0	1.7	2.5	1.5		4.0	0.2
20–22 Jul	Termometro Politico	3,300	15.9	19.8	20.7	5.9	20.5	2.8		1.7	1.8	3.3	2.9		4.7	0.2
14–19 Jul	SWG	1,200	15.2	19.1	20.1	6.5	20.5	2.6	2.4	1.8	1.8	4.1	2.5	1.3	2.1	0.4
16 Jul	Tecnè	1,000	14.8	19.7	20.2	9.0	20.8	1.8	2.0	1.5	1.5	3.3	2.1		3.3	0.6
13–15 Jul	Termometro Politico	3,200	15.7	19.7	20.8	6.1	20.2	3.2		1.5	1.9	3.0	3.1		4.8	0.6
12–14 Jul	Demos & Pi	1,010	15.3	19.7	20.5	8.0	20.1	3.7		2.0		2.5	2.5		5.7	0.4
12–13 Jul	Euromedia	1,000	14.3	19.5	20.3	7.5	20.5	1.8	1.6	1.6	1.8	3.8	2.5		4.8	0.2
7–12 Jul	SWG	1,200	14.4	18.9	20.2	6.8	20.8	2.5	2.7	2.0	1.7	3.9	2.4	1.2	2.5	0.6
8–9 Jul	Tecnè	1,000	15.1	19.6	20.4	9.1	20.6	1.7	1.9	1.6	1.6	3.2	2.0	0.9	2.3	0.2
6–8 Jul	Termometro Politico	3,200	15.5	19.4	21.4	5.8	20.0	3.5		1.6	1.7	3.0	3.1		5.0	1.4
30 Jun–5 Jul	SWG	1,200	14.6	18.7	20.6	7.0	20.5	2.7	2.4	2.1	1.8	4.0	2.5	1.0	2.1	0.1
2 Jul	Tecnè	1,000	14.7	19.5	20.5	9.3	20.8		2.0	1.5	1.7	3.1	2.1	0.9	3.9	0.3
1–2 Jul	Euromedia	1,000	14.5	19.8	20.5	7.8	20.2	2.2	1.4	1.6	1.4	2.8	2.1		5.7	0.3
29 Jun–1 Jul	Termometro Politico	3,200	15.4	19.6	21.8	5.9	19.6	3.4		1.5	1.8	3.1	2.9		5.0	2.2
29 Jun–1 Jul	Ixè	1,000	17.0	20.3	21.0	8.6	18.1	2.5	2.2	1.7	1.1	2.1	1.2		4.2	0.7
23–28 Jun	SWG	1,200	16.6	18.8	20.3	7.0	20.7	2.3	2.7	1.8	1.5	3.9	2.1	1.0	1.3	0.4
25 Jun	Tecnè	1,000	15.2	19.1	20.4	9.3	20.5		1.9	1.4	1.8	3.2	2.2	1.0	4.0	0.1
23–24 Jun	Demopolis	2,000	17.2	20.0	21.0	6.8	21.0	2.0	2.3			2.5	1.8	1.6	3.8	Tie
22–24 Jun	Ipsos	1,000	16.5	19.7	20.1	7.9	19.4	1.5	2.2	2.1	1.4	2.3	2.0		4.9	0.4
22–24 Jun	Termometro Politico	3,000	16.1	19.9	21.8	6.1	19.6	3.1		1.6	1.6	2.7	2.6		4.9	1.9
22 Jun	Piepoli	520	16.5	19.5	20.5	7.5	19.5	2.5		2.0		2.5	2.0		7.5	1.0
21 Jun	EMG	1,498	16.8	17.6	20.8	7.0	19.1	2.0	2.0	1.4	2.0	3.4	3.6	1.5	2.8	1.7
16–21 Jun	SWG	1,200	16.0	18.6	20.6	6.8	20.5	2.4	2.5	1.9	1.8	3.8	2.3	1.3	1.5	0.1
18 Jun	Tecnè	1,000	15.6	18.9	20.7	9.2	20.3		2.1	1.3	1.7	3.3	2.1	1.1	3.7	0.4
14–17 Jun	BiDiMedia	2,014	15.3	20.3	20.1	7.0	19.0	1.7	1.8	1.2	1.5	2.8	2.1	1.3	5.9	0.2
17 Jun	Tecnè	1,000	15.7	19.0	20.7	9.2	20.3		2.2	1.3	1.7	3.2	2.0	1.1	3.6	0.4
15–17 Jun	Termometro Politico	2,900	15.8	19.6	22.2	6.4	19.5	2.9		1.5	1.4	3.0	2.8		4.9	2.6
15–17 Jun	Ixè	1,000	17.6	20.1	20.4	8.8	17.8	2.8	2.1	1.9	1.1	2.9	1.6		2.9	0.3
15–17 Jun	EMG	1,428	17.0	17.5	21.3	7.0	18.6	1.9	1.9	1.3	2.0	3.2	3.7	1.6	3.0	2.7
14 Jun	Euromedia	1,000	16.2	19.0	21.2	6.6	20.3	2.4	1.6	1.4	1.7	3.1	2.4		4.1	0.9
12–14 Jun	Lab2101	1,000	15.9	19.6	22.4	7.1	18.2	3.8		1.5	1.4	3.2	2.6		4.3	2.8
9–14 Jun	SWG	1,200	16.2	19.0	20.9	6.8	20.4	2.3	2.3	2.0	1.9	3.4	2.0	1.2	1.6	0.5
12 Jun	Ipsos	1,000	14.2	20.8	20.1	9.2	20.5	1.4	1.8	1.3	1.2	2.8	1.8		4.9	0.3
11 Jun	Tecnè	1,000	16.0	19.0	20.9	9.1	19.8		2.0	1.4	1.8	3.0	2.1	1.4	3.5	1.1
8–10 Jun	Termometro Politico	3,200	16.0	19.7	22.5	6.0	19.4	2.9		1.6	1.3	3.0	2.7		4.9	2.8
8 Jun	Euromedia	800	16.0	18.0	21.5	6.6	19.8	2.3	1.7	1.6	1.4	2.8	2.4		5.9	1.7
7–8 Jun	Piepoli	519	16.5	19.5	21.5	6.5	19.0	2.5		2.0		3.5	2.5		6.5	2.0
7–8 Jun	Demopolis	1,500	16.8	19.4	21.3	6.7	19.5	2.0	2.3			2.6	1.8	1.8	5.8	1.9
7 Jun	EMG	1,584	17.1	17.8	21.5	7.0	18.6	1.9	1.9	1.2	2.1	3.2	3.7	1.4	2.6	2.9
6–7 Jun	Tecnè	800	16.1	18.7	21.1	9.1	19.7		2.3	1.4	1.7	2.9	1.9	1.8	3.3	1.4
2–7 Jun	SWG	1,200	15.9	19.2	21.4	6.9	20.1	2.1	2.6	1.8	1.8	3.4	2.1	1.0	1.7	1.3
4 Jun	Tecnè	1,002	16.3	18.6	21.0	9.0	19.7		2.3	1.3	1.7	2.9	1.9	1.9	3.4	1.3
3 Jun	Noto	1,000	16.0	18.0	21.5	7.0	18.5	1.0	1.5		1.5	2.5	2.0	3.5	7.0	2.0
1–3 Jun	Termometro Politico	3,100	15.7	20.0	22.4	6.2	19.1	3.0		1.5	1.4	3.2	2.8		4.7	2.4
1 Jun	Euromedia	1,000	15.1	18.6	22.0	6.3	19.1	2.5	1.1	1.5	2.0	3.5	2.0		6.3	2.9
1 Jun	EMG	1,623	17.4	18.0	21.2	6.8	19.1	1.8	1.9	1.1	2.0	3.0	3.8	1.4	2.4	2.1
30–31 May	Tecnè	1,000	16.7	18.9	21.1	9.2	19.4		2.4		1.7	3.2	2.1		5.3	1.7
26–31 May	SWG	1,200	15.8	19.0	21.7	6.3	20.0	2.2	3.0	2.0	1.7	3.6	2.1		2.6	1.7
30 May	Piepoli	–	17.5	19.0	22.0	7.0	18.0	2.5		1.5		3.0	2.5		7.0	3.0
28 May	Tecnè	1,000	16.8	18.8	21.0	9.2	19.4		2.4		1.8	3.2	2.1		5.3	1.6
26–27 May	Tecnè	1,000	16.8	19.0	21.0	9.3	19.4		2.5		1.7		3.4	1.9	5.0	1.6
25–27 May	Termometro Politico	3,100	16.1	19.8	22.3	6.6	18.6	3.3		1.3	1.2	3.1	2.8	Did not exist	4.9	2.5
25–27 May	Ipsos	1,000	15.4	19.4	22.4	7.7	19.4	1.6	2.0	2.2	1.7	2.4	1.9	Did not exist	3.9	3.0
26 May	Euromedia	800	15.5	18.8	21.8	6.5	19.0	2.7	0.8	1.4	2.1	3.1	1.8	Did not exist	6.5	2.8
25 May	Piepoli	503	17.5	19.0	21.5	7.0	18.0	2.5		2.0		3.5	2.0	Did not exist	7.0	2.5
25 May	EMG	1,572	17.6	17.7	21.5	6.9	18.9	1.6	1.8	1.1	1.9	3.0	3.9	Did not exist	4.1	2.6
19–24 May	SWG	1,200	16.5	19.5	21.3	6.9	19.5	1.9	2.7	2.0	1.8	3.3	1.8	Did not exist	2.8	1.8
21 May	Tecnè	1,000	16.7	19.0	21.1	9.3	19.1		2.5		1.6	3.3	2.0	Did not exist	5.4	2.0

Fieldwork date	Polling firm	Sample size	M5S	PD	Lega	FI	FdI	LeU	+E	EV	C!	A	IV	Others	Lead
20–21 May	Quorum – YouTrend	807	17.3	19.5	21.1	7.4	18.8	3.3	2.1	1.8		3.0	2.7	3.1	1.6
19–20 May	Noto	1,000	17.0	18.0	22.0	7.5	18.0	3.0		1.5	1.5	3.0	2.0	6.5	4.0
18–20 May	Termometro Politico	3,200	15.7	19.8	22.6	6.4	18.7	3.2	1.4	1.3		3.1	3.0	4.8	2.8
19 May	Euromedia	1,000	16.5	18.8	21.1	7.7	19.0	3.8	1.5	2.5		3.3	2.1	3.7	2.1
19 May	Index	800	16.2	19.5	21.0	6.7	18.5	4.7	1.5	2.1	1.3	3.5	1.9	3.1	1.5
18 May	EMG	1,548	17.9	17.4	21.8	7.0	18.7	3.5	1.2	1.7	1.3	3.1	3.9	2.5	3.1
17–18 May	Piepoli	505	17.5	19.5	22.5	6.5	18.0	2.5	1.5			3.5	2.5	6.0	3.0
12–17 May	SWG	1,200	16.8	19.2	21.0	7.0	19.5	4.7	1.9	2.0		3.5	1.8	2.6	1.5
14 May	Tecnè	1,000	16.5	19.2	21.2	9.4	19.0	2.3		1.7		3.5	1.9	5.3	2.0
11–13 May	Termometro Politico	3,200	16.0	19.4	23.1	6.5	18.7	3.0	1.2	1.5		3.0	2.8	4.8	3.7
11–12 May	Index	800	16.0	20.0	21.3	6.8	18.0	4.7	1.4	2.1	1.3	3.5	2.0	2.9	1.3
10–12 May	Demos & Pi	1,010	17.7	20.1	21.3	7.6	18.2	4.3	2.1			2.6	2.0	4.1	1.2
11 May	EMG	1,523	18.4	16.9	22.2	6.9	18.5	3.4	1.1	1.6	1.3	3.3	4.0	2.4	3.8
11 May	Piepoli	–	17.5	19.5	22.5	6.5	18.0	3.0	2.0			3.5	2.0	5.5	3.0
5–10 May	SWG	1,200	17.0	19.5	21.3	6.7	19.1	4.6	1.7	1.8	1.0	3.7	1.8	1.8	1.8
7 May	Tecnè	1,000	16.2	19.5	21.3	9.6	18.9	2.4		1.6		3.5	1.8	5.2	1.8
5–7 May	Ixè	1,000	17.0	19.8	21.6	7.8	18.1	5.3	1.4	1.2		3.0	2.1	2.7	1.8
5–6 May	Demopolis	2,000	16.5	20.0	21.5	7.6	18.4	3.5				2.6	2.0	7.9	1.5
4–6 May	Termometro Politico	4,100	16.4	19.8	22.8	6.2	18.9	2.8	1.3	1.3		3.1	2.6	4.8	3.0
3–6 May	Lab2101	1,000	15.4	19.9	23.1	7.1	17.8	4.1	1.4	1.4		3.3	2.4	4.1	3.2
5 May	Index	800	16.5	20.1	21.1	6.8	17.8	4.6	1.5	2.0	1.3	3.4	2.0	2.9	1.0
5 May	Euromedia	800	15.7	19.0	21.3	7.1	17.5	3.8	1.9	2.7		3.5	2.0	5.5	2.3
1–5 May	BiDiMedia	1,879	15.1	20.0	21.7	7.5	17.8	3.9	1.4	1.7	0.7	2.8	2.2	5.2	1.7
4 May	EMG	1,488	19.0	16.8	22.1	6.8	17.6	3.3	1.1	1.6	1.3	3.2	4.1	3.1	3.1
28 Apr–3 May	SWG	1,200	17.8	19.0	20.9	6.6	18.7	4.4	2.0	2.1	1.0	3.5	1.7	2.3	1.9
30 Apr	Tecnè	998	16.4	19.3	21.6	9.7	18.6	2.3		1.8		3.3	1.9	7.4	2.3
27–29 Apr	Termometro Politico	4,000	16.2	19.4	22.4	6.5	19.1	2.7	1.3	1.6		3.0	3.0	4.8	3.0
27–29 Apr	Ipsos	1,000	16.0	20.9	21.9	8.0	18.9	3.3	1.3	1.3		2.8	2.0	3.6	1.0
28 Apr	Index	800	16.7	20.0	21.2	6.8	17.9	4.4	1.5	1.9	1.3	3.5	2.1	2.7	1.2
21–26 Apr	SWG	1,200	17.4	19.1	21.8	6.8	17.6	4.7	1.7	2.0	1.1	3.6	1.9	2.3	2.7
23 Apr	Tecnè	1,000	16.0	19.5	21.8	9.8	18.5	3.4	0.9	1.9		3.1	2.0	3.1	2.3
22 Apr	Noto	1,000	17.5	19.0	23.0	6.5	17.0	2.5		1.5	2.0	3.0	2.0	6.0	4.0
20–22 Apr	Termometro Politico	3,200	15.9	19.7	22.8	6.2	19.0	2.9	1.3	1.5		3.1	2.8	4.8	3.1
20–22 Apr	Index	800	16.6	20.0	21.6	6.5	17.8	4.2	1.5	1.9	1.3	3.5	2.3	2.7	1.6
19 Apr	Piepoli	506	18.0	19.5	22.5	6.0	17.5	2.5	2.5			3.5	2.5	5.5	3.0
18–19 Apr	Demopolis	1,500	16.0	19.0	22.4	7.6	18.2	3.4				2.5	2.0	8.9	3.4
14–19 Apr	SWG	1,200	18.4	19.1	21.2	6.4	18.0	4.5	1.7	1.9	1.1	3.7	2.1	1.9	2.1
15–16 Apr	Tecnè	2,001	16.6	19.2	22.0	9.8	18.3	3.4	1.0	1.7		2.9	2.0	3.1	2.8
13–15 Apr	Termometro Politico	3,100	15.7	19.4	23.3	6.0	18.8	2.9	1.3	1.5		3.4	3.0	4.7	3.9
13 Apr	EMG	1,582	16.5	18.1	22.9	7.5	17.2	2.9	1.0	1.6	1.4	3.0	4.0	3.9	4.8
12–13 Apr	Piepoli	505	17.5	19.5	23.0	6.0	17.5	2.5	2.5			3.5	2.5	5.5	3.5
9–12 Apr	Tecnè	1,998	16.5	18.8	22.4	9.9	18.1	3.2	1.2	1.8		2.9	2.1	3.1	3.6
7–12 Apr	SWG	1,200	17.7	19.3	22.0	6.7	17.3	4.5	1.5	2.2	1.0	3.4	2.2	2.2	2.7
1–12 Apr	Noto	2,000	16.5	19.0	23.5	6.5	17.0	1.5	1.0	1.5	2.0	3.0	2.5	6.0	4.5
8–9 Apr	Tecnè	1,502	16.5	18.9	22.3	9.9	18.1	3.3	1.2	1.8		2.8	2.0	3.2	3.4
6–8 Apr	Termometro Politico	2,400	15.9	19.8	23.3	5.9	19.1	2.8	1.3	1.3		3.2	2.7	4.7	2.7
5–8 Apr	BiDiMedia	3,726	14.5	19.8	22.5	7.8	16.7	4.2	1.4	1.8	0.9	3.0	2.7	4.7	2.7
7 Apr	Index	800	16.4	20.0	22.7	6.4	17.1	3.9	1.6	1.9	1.4	3.4	2.4	2.8	2.7
7 Apr	Euromedia	800	17.4	19.4	22.0	7.2	17.6	2.8	1.5	1.7		3.8	2.5	4.1	2.6
6 Apr	Piepoli	–	17.0	19.5	23.0	6.0	18.0	3.0	2.0			3.5	2.5	5.5	4.4
31 Mar–6 Apr	SWG	1,200	17.5	18.4	22.8	6.8	17.6	4.4	1.8	1.9	1.0	3.5	2.4	1.9	4.4
4 Apr	Lab2101	1,000	15.7	19.9	24.7	6.4	16.4	4.1	1.6	1.5		3.2	2.9	3.6	4.8
1 Apr	Tecnè	1,003	16.3	18.5	22.6	10.1	18.0	3.4	1.2	1.7		3.0	2.1	3.1	4.1
30 Mar–1 Apr	Termometro Politico	2,300	15.5	19.6	23.6	6.1	18.9	3.1	1.3	1.4		3.0	2.8	4.7	4.0
30 Mar–1 Apr	Ipsos	1,000	17.8	20.0	22.0	7.6	18.0	2.8	1.6	1.8		2.2	2.3	3.9	2.0
31 Mar	Index	800	16.0	18.8	23.5	6.5	16.8	3.6	1.6	2.0	1.5	3.7	2.7	3.3	4.7
30 Mar	EMG	1,684	20.0	15.9	22.3	6.2	16.9	3.1	1.1	1.7	1.3	2.5	3.9	5.1	2.3
24–29 Mar	SWG	1,200	17.4	18.8	22.6	6.5	17.7	4.5	1.7	2.3	1.3	3.2	2.2	1.8	3.8
26 Mar	Tecnè	1,000	16.0	18.3	23.2	10.3	17.8	3.3	1.3	1.6		3.1	2.2	2.9	4.9
24–25 Mar	Noto	1,000	16.5	18.0	24.5	6.5	16.5	3.5		1.5	2.0	3.0	2.5	5.5	6.5
23–25 Mar	Ipsos	1,000	18.0	20.3	22.5	7.6	17.2	3.2	1.5	1.6		2.4	2.2	3.5	2.2
23–25 Mar	Termometro Politico	2,200	15.6	19.4	23.3	6.4	18.5	3.1	1.3	1.4		3.2	3.1	4.7	3.9
22 Mar	Demopolis	–	16.3	18.0	23.0	8.2	18.0	3.6				2.5	2.0	8.4	5.0
17–22 Mar	SWG	1,200	17.5	19.0	23.3	6.7	17.1	4.5	1.2	2.0		3.4	2.3	3.0	4.3
19 Mar	Tecnè	1,002	15.8	18.0	23.6	10.5	17.6	3.2	1.5	1.5		3.2	2.3	2.8	5.6
16–18 Mar	Winpoll	2,000	14.1	20.1	22.2	6.7	19.1	2.4	0.5	1.9	0.5	3.1	2.5	6.9	2.1
16–18 Mar	Termometro Politico	2,700	15.3	19.7	23.6	6.1	18.8	3.2	1.2	1.5		2.9	3.1	4.6	3.9
17 Mar	Index	800	15.3	18.0	24.0	6.1	16.6	3.8	1.8	2.2	1.5	3.9	2.8	3.1	6.0
17 Mar	Euromedia	800	17.4	16.3	22.7	7.6	16.5	3.5	1.1	2.4		4.3	2.7	5.5	5.3
16 Mar	Piepoli	–	16.5	19.0	24.0	6.0	17.5	3.0	2.5			3.5	2.5	5.5	5.0
16 Mar	EMG	1,526	19.9	16.3	22.4	6.6	16.9	3.3	1.5	1.8	1.3	2.8	4.0	3.2	2.5
10–16 Mar	Format Research	1,000	17.2	18.3	23.1	6.8	18.0	3.1	1.6			3.5	2.9	5.5	4.8
10–15 Mar	SWG	1,200	17.0	17.4	24.2	6.4	17.0	5.2	2.0	1.9		3.2	2.2	3.4	6.8
12 Mar	Tecnè	1,000	16.0	17.3	23.5	10.4	17.5	3.3	1.9	1.4		3.5	2.4	2.8	6.0
9–11 Mar	Termometro Politico	2,700	15.7	19.2	23.9	5.9	18.5	3.4	1.6	1.1		3.2	3.0	4.5	4.7
8–11 Mar	Demos & Pi	1,522	18.8	17.0	22.3	8.3	17.2	4.5	2.0			2.3	2.1	5.5	3.5
9–10 Mar	Demopolis	1,804	16.4	17.5	23.2	8.3	18.0	3.6				2.7	2.0	8.3	5.2
8–10 Mar	Ixè	1,000	15.7	17.4	23.9	9.3	15.5	5.5	1.7	1.4		2.7	1.9	5.0	6.5
9 Mar	Euromedia	1,000	17.2	16.5	22.9	8.2	16.7	3.4	2.0	1.4		4.2	2.9	4.6	5.7
9 Mar	EMG	1,493	17.2	17.5	22.7	7.4	16.3	3.5	1.8	1.8	1.4	3.0	4.1	3.3	5.2
8 Mar	Piepoli	–	16.5	18.5	23.5	6.5	17.5	3.0	2.5			4.0	2.5	5.5	5.0
3–8 Mar	SWG	1,200	17.2	16.6	23.5	7.0	16.8	5.1	2.3	2.1		3.7	2.5	3.2	6.3
7 Mar	Lab2101	1,000	13.8	19.1	25.9	7.4	17.1	4.4	1.8	1.5		3.8	2.9	2.6	6.8
5 Mar	Tecnè	1,001	14.1	18.3	23.7	10.5	17.6	3.0	2.2	1.5		3.6	2.6	2.9	5.4
3–4 Mar	Termometro Politico	2,700	15.2	19.1	23.5	6.2	18.9	3.5	1.7	1.1		3.4	2.9	4.5	4.4
1–4 Mar	BiDiMedia	1,465	13.6	20.1	23.0	8.4	16.1	4.0	1.6	1.9	0.7	3.1	2.8	4.7	2.9
3 Mar	Index	800	14.5	19.1	23.4	7.1	16.5	3.7	2.2	2.1	1.4	4.0	2.9	3.1	4.3
1–3 Mar	Ixè	1,000	15.3	20.0	23.5	8.9	15.6	3.5	1.8	1.3		3.4	1.8	4.9	3.5
1 Mar	EMG	1,487	14.1	19.3	23.8	7.6	16.1	3.0	2.0	2.0	1.4	3.4	4.4	2.6	4.5
24 Feb–1 Mar	SWG	1,200	15.8	18.5	23.4	6.9	17.0	4.6	2.0	1.9		3.9	2.8	3.2	4.9
26 Feb	Tecnè	1,498	13.2	19.0	23.6	10.6	17.6	3.2	2.1	1.6		3.4	2.7	3.0	4.6
24–25 Feb	Ipsos	1,000	15.4	19.0	23.0	7.6	17.2	3.6	2.3	1.6		2.3	2.9	5.1	4.0
22–24 Feb	Termometro Politico	2,700	15.0	19.4	24.0	6.2	18.5	3.5	1.5	1.3		3.1	3.0	4.5	4.6
22 Feb	Euromedia	1,000	14.5	18.3	23.6	7.6	16.6	3.0	1.7	2.1		3.5	3.2	5.9	5.3
20–22 Feb	Tecnè	1,501	13.2	19.3	23.7	10.5	17.5	3.0	2.0	1.6		3.3	2.8	3.1	4.4
17–22 Feb	SWG	1,200	15.4	18.3	23.1	7.5	17.5	4.3	1.9	1.8		3.9	2.6	3.7	4.8
19 Feb	Tecnè	1,002	13.3	19.3	23.8	10.6	17.4	3.1	2.0	1.5		3.3	2.8	2.9	4.5
18 Feb	Noto	1,000	14.5	19.0	24.5	6.5	16.5	3.0	1.0	1.0	2.0	3.5	3.5	5.0	5.5
17 Feb	Index	800	14.6	19.3	24.5	7.0	16.2	3.6	2.0	1.9	1.4	4.0	3.0	2.5	5.2
16–17 Feb	EMG	1,488	13.6	19.5	23.7	8.0	16.2	2.7	2.1	2.1	1.3	3.7	4.2	2.9	4.2
15–17 Feb	Termometro Politico	2,900	15.8	19.7	23.6	6.0	17.9	3.3	1.5	1.1		3.4	3.3	4.4	3.9
15–16 Feb	Quorum – YouTrend	808	13.9	20.2	23.7	8.9	16.9	3.4	2.0	1.8		2.4	2.6	4.2	3.5
15 Feb	Tecnè	998	13.1	19.3	23.9	10.6	17.4	3.0	2.1	1.6		3.3	2.7	3.0	4.6
10–15 Feb	SWG	1,200	15.4	18.8	23.5	6.9	16.2	4.0	2.1	1.8		4.3	3.1	3.9	4.7
13 Feb	Tecnè	1,000	13.2	19.2	23.9	10.6	17.3	3.0	2.1	1.6		3.4	2.8	2.9	4.7
11-13 Feb	Lab2101	1,000	13.1	19.7	26.4	7.3	17.1	4.0	1.8	1.5		3.7	2.8	2.6	6.7
9–11 Feb	Termometro Politico	2,250	16.4	20.0	24.0	6.2	17.4	2.9	1.2	1.1		3.2	3.3	4.3	4.0
10–11 Feb	Winpoll	1,000	13.3	19.8	23.9	7.0	18.5	1.9	0.8	1.5	0.7	3.4	2.7	6.5	4.1
10 Feb	Index	800	14.7	19.4	24.4	6.8	16.5	3.7	2.0	1.8	1.4	3.9	3.1	2.3	5.0
10 Feb	Euromedia	800	14.7	18.7	22.8	8.2	15.0	3.3	2.0	2.1		3.1	3.4	6.7	4.1
7–9 Feb	BiDiMedia	1,558	13.3	20.5	23.5	7.9	15.7	3.2	w. A	1.9	0.8	4.6	2.9	5.7	3.0
8 Feb	Piepoli	–	15.5	20.5	23.5	7.0	16.0	3.0	2.0			3.5	2.5	6.5	3.0
3–8 Feb	SWG	1,200	15.8	19.0	24.0	6.4	16.5	3.7	1.9	1.7		4.0	3.1	3.9	5.0
5 Feb	Tecnè	1,000	13.6	19.4	23.8	10.5	16.9	2.9	2.2	1.5		3.5	2.7	3.0	4.4
3–5 Feb	Demos & Pi	1,001	15.2	20.9	22.8	7.8	16.9	3.2	2.0			2.8	2.7	5.7	1.9
4 Feb	Noto	1,000	15.0	19.0	24.0	7.0	16.5	2.0	1.0	1.5	2.0	3.0	3.0	6.0	5.0
2–4 Feb	Termometro Politico	3,400	15.9	19.7	24.5	6.5	16.9	3.3	1.3	1.3		3.3	3.4	3.9	4.8
3 Feb	Index	800	14.5	19.6	24.0	6.7	16.6	3.7	2.3	1.9	1.3	3.8	3.1	2.5	4.4
2 Feb	EMG	1,482	13.9	20.1	23.9	7.7	15.8	2.8	2.1	2.1	1.1	3.7	4.1	2.7	3.8
1 Feb	Euromedia	800	14.1	19.5	24.3	7.7	15.2	3.2	w. A	1.6		4.8	3.5	6.1	4.8
27 Jan–1 Feb	SWG	1,200	16.3	19.8	23.3	5.8	15.9	4.0	2.1	2.1		3.6	3.2	3.9	3.5
29 Jan	Tecnè	1,000	13.8	19.5	23.9	10.2	17.1	3.0	2.0	1.6		3.3	2.7	2.9	4.4
27–28 Jan	Noto	1,000	14.0	20.0	23.5	7.0	17.0	2.7	1.0	1.5	2.2	3.0	4.0	4.1	3.5
27–28 Jan	Ipsos	1,000	18.1	19.3	22.0	8.9	15.3	2.9	2.3			3.1	2.3	5.8	2.7
26–28 Jan	Termometro Politico	3,000	15.7	19.7	24.2	6.0	16.7	3.2	1.2	1.3	0.5	3.5	3.3	4.7	4.5
25–28 Jan	Ixè	1,000	15.4	20.6	23.2	8.8	15.8	3.5	1.5	2.0		3.7	2.1	3.4	2.5
27 Jan	Index	800	14.6	19.2	24.3	6.5	16.7	3.7	2.4	2.0	1.1	3.7	2.9	2.9	5.1
26–27 Jan	Winpoll	1,000	13.7	19.6	24.3	6.9	18.7	1.7	0.7	1.6	0.9	3.2	2.4	6.3	4.7
25–27 Jan	Lab2101	803	14.6	20.2	25.7	6.6	16.7	3.8	1.9	1.6		3.6	2.9	2.4	5.4
26 Jan	EMG	1,564	14.0	20.0	24.1	7.6	16.1	2.7	2.1	2.1	1.1	3.6	4.1	2.5	4.1
23–25 Jan	Demopolis	2,000	15.0	20.2	23.0	8.8	17.2	3.8				2.9	2.8	6.3	2.8
20–25 Jan	SWG	1,200	15.7	19.6	23.5	6.3	16.3	3.8	1.9	2.2		4.0	3.0	3.7	3.9
22 Jan	Tecnè	1,000	14.1	20.2	23.2	10.2	16.8	3.1	1.8	1.7		3.4	2.5	3.0	3.0
19–21 Jan	Termometro Politico	2,100	15.3	20.2	23.8	6.5	17.3	3.0	1.2	1.0	0.6	3.3	3.3	4.5	3.6
20 Jan	Euromedia	800	14.3	19.5	24.8	8.0	15.5	2.7	1.6	1.4		3.5	2.8	5.2	5.3
15–19 Jan	Index	1,200	15.0	19.5	23.2	6.5	17.0	3.6	2.5	1.9	1.2	3.8	2.9	2.9	3.7
19 Jan	EMG	1,524	14.1	20.1	23.7	7.5	16.4	2.8	2.0	2.1	1.0	3.5	4.0	2.8	3.6
15–18 Jan	Demopolis	2,000	15.5	20.8	23.0	8.0	17.0	3.7				2.8	2.6	6.6	2.2
14–18 Jan	SWG	1,200	15.8	20.1	22.3	6.4	16.5	4.0	2.2	2.0		4.3	2.7	3.7	2.2
16–17 Jan	Tecnè	1,003	14.3	20.2	23.2	10.4	16.6	3.4	2.0	1.6		3.2	2.2	2.9	3.0
14 Jan	Index	800	14.6	19.2	23.7	6.8	16.9	3.5	2.5	2.0	1.1	3.7	3.5	2.5	4.5
14 Jan	Noto	1,000	14.0	19.5	24.0	7.5	17.0	2.0	1.0	1.5	2.0	3.5	3.5	8.0	4.5
13–14 Jan	Ipsos	1,000	16.3	19.9	23.1	10.2	15.0	3.5	2.5	1.5		3.3	2.4	2.3	3.2
10–13 Jan	BiDiMedia	1,555	12.9	21.8	23.5	7.5	16.4	3.2	1.4	1.7	0.7	3.1	2.7	5.1	1.7
12 Jan	EMG	1,684	13.9	19.8	24.0	7.4	16.2	2.7	2.2	2.2	1.0	3.6	4.2	2.8	4.2
11–12 Jan	Euromedia	1,000	14.1	19.4	23.2	7.5	15.5	2.8	2.2	1.6		4.2	3.0	6.5	3.8
11 Jan	Tecnè	800	14.1	20.0	23.4	10.5	16.6	3.1	1.9	1.5		3.1	2.8	3.0	3.4
7–11 Jan	SWG	1,200	14.7	19.4	23.2	5.9	17.2	3.8	2.1	2.4	1.0	4.1	2.9	3.3	3.8
2–5 Jan	Lab2101	1,000	14.4	20.4	25.7	6.9	16.6	3.6	1.7	1.8		3.2	2.7	3.0	5.3
4 Jan	Tecnè	1,000	14.0	20.1	23.2	10.4	16.8	3.2	1.8	1.5		3.2	2.9	2.9	3.1

=== 2020 ===
Fieldwork date	Polling firm	Sample size	M5S	PD	Lega	FI	FdI	LeU	+E	EV	C!	A	IV	Others	Lead
28–31 Dec	Lab2101	1,000	14.7	20.7	25.5	7.0	16.3	3.7	1.6	1.7		3.3	2.6	2.9	4.8
28 Dec	EMG	1,672	13.9	20.0	24.3	7.3	16.2	2.8	2.1	2.2	1.1	3.7	4.4	2.0	4.3
21 Dec	Euromedia	800	14.5	20.5	23.8	7.0	15.0	3.0	2.1	1.6		3.3	2.5	6.7	3.3
16–21 Dec	SWG	1,200	14.3	20.4	23.4	6.3	16.7	3.6	2.4	2.0	1.2	3.7	2.8	3.2	3.0
18 Dec	Tecnè	1,000	14.2	20.6	23.5	8.1	17.0	3.4	2.0	1.6		3.3	3.1	3.2	2.9
17–18 Dec	Quorum – YouTrend	502	15.0	20.7	23.2	7.5	16.1	3.3	1.8	1.6		3.1	3.1	4.6	2.5
16–17 Dec	Ipsos	1,000	16.0	20.2	23.5	9.3	16.0	3.0	1.9	1.8		3.0	3.0	2.3	3.3
15–17 Dec	Termometro Politico	2,100	14.3	20.3	25.4	6.2	16.2	3.1	1.4	1.1	0.6	3.3	3.2	5.5	5.1
13–16 Dec	BiDiMedia	1,398	12.7	22.0	22.9	7.0	16.8	3.0	1.5	1.8	0.6	3.0	3.2	5.5	0.9
15 Dec	Euromedia	800	14.8	19.3	24.0	6.8	15.5	2.8	2.0	1.5		3.4	3.7	6.2	4.7
14 Dec	EMG	1,664	14.0	20.3	24.5	7.3	16.3	2.8	2.0	2.0	1.1	3.5	4.4	1.8	4.2
14 Dec	Tecnè	1,000	14.3	20.4	23.8	8.1	17.2	3.4	1.9	1.5		3.2	3.1	3.1	3.4
9–14 Dec	SWG	1,200	14.8	20.1	23.9	5.9	16.8	3.3	2.1	2.1	1.0	3.8	3.1	3.1	3.8
11 Dec	Tecnè	1,000	14.2	20.3	23.7	8.2	17.1	3.5	1.9	1.5		3.3	3.0	3.3	3.4
10–11 Dec	Quorum – YouTrend	503	14.6	20.7	23.8	7.4	16.0	3.4	1.9	1.5		3.3	3.0	4.5	3.1
8–10 Dec	Termometro Politico	2,300	14.5	20.3	25.0	6.2	16.4	3.0	1.5	1.0	0.6	3.2	3.2	5.1	4.7
7–10 Dec	Demos & Pi	1,002	15.5	21.5	22.5	7.4	16.6	3.4	2.4			2.9	2.5	5.3	1.0
7–10 Dec	Ixè	1,000	15.6	21.9	23.2	8.3	16.0	3.2	1.9	1.5		2.1	2.5	3.8	1.3
7–8 Dec	EMG	1,684	14.0	20.4	24.4	7.2	16.3	2.7	1.9	2.0	1.0	3.6	4.4	2.1	4.0
2–7 Dec	SWG	1,200	14.7	20.4	24.3	6.2	16.4	3.5	2.2	2.0	1.0	3.4	3.2	2.7	3.9
4 Dec	Tecnè	1,000	14.4	20.5	23.2	8.2	17.0	3.4	1.8	1.6		3.4	3.1	3.4	2.7
3–4 Dec	Quorum – YouTrend	502	14.9	20.7	23.5	7.4	16.0	3.2	2.0	1.7		3.2	3.1	4.3	2.8
1–3 Dec	Termometro Politico	2,300	14.2	20.4	25.8	6.1	15.9	3.0	1.5	1.2	0.5	3.4	3.1	4.9	5.4
2 Dec	Noto	1,000	14.0	21.0	25.0	7.0	16.0	2.0	1.0	1.5	1.5	3.5	4.0	3.5	4.0
1 Dec	EMG	1,418	14.0	20.2	24.5	7.3	16.2	2.7	1.9	2.0	1.2	3.6	4.3	2.1	4.3
25–30 Nov	SWG	1,200	15.0	19.8	24.4	6.2	16.4	3.4	2.1	2.3	1.2	3.5	3.0	2.7	4.6
27 Nov	Tecnè	1,000	14.6	20.8	23.0	8.2	16.9	3.4	1.9	1.5		3.3	3.2	3.2	2.2
26–27 Nov	Quorum – YouTrend	502	15.2	20.4	23.0	7.1	15.9	3.4	2.4	1.6		3.2	3.2	4.6	2.6
25–27 Nov	Quorum – YouTrend	805	15.2	20.6	23.4	7.0	16.0	3.1	1.8	1.3		2.9	3.0	5.7	2.8
25–26 Nov	Ipsos	1,000	15.0	20.6	25.5	8.0	15.5	3.2	1.9	2.0		3.0	2.8	2.5	4.9
24–26 Nov	Termometro Politico	2,300	14.5	20.5	24.6	6.4	16.6	2.9	1.3	1.1		3.3	3.1	5.7	4.1
22–25 Nov	BiDiMedia	1,484	13.5	22.1	24.0	6.8	16.0	3.0	1.5	1.8	0.5	2.8	3.2	4.8	1.9
23–24 Nov	Demoskopea	1,000	14.2	20.0	23.5	6.7	17.5	3.0	3.5	2.0		3.5	3.0	3.1	3.5
23 Nov	EMG	1,321	14.3	20.3	24.4	7.1	16.4	2.5	1.8	1.8	1.2	3.8	4.3	2.1	4.1
18–23 Nov	SWG	1,200	15.6	20.3	23.3	6.4	16.2	3.7	2.0	2.0	1.1	3.6	2.9	2.9	3.0
18–21 Nov	Ixè	1,000	15.6	21.7	22.3	8.1	16.3	2.6	1.8	1.3		2.3	2.7	5.3	0.6
19–20 Nov	Quorum – YouTrend	500	15.0	20.3	23.4	6.9	15.4	3.6	2.6	1.8		3.2	3.0	4.8	3.1
19–20 Nov	Tecnè	1,000	14.4	20.6	23.2	7.9	17.1	3.5	2.0	1.4		3.5	3.3	3.1	2.6
17–19 Nov	Termometro Politico	2,300	14.3	20.9	25.1	6.1	16.2	2.7	1.3	1.3		3.3	2.8	6.0	4.2
18 Nov	Euromedia	800	15.5	19.1	23.8	6.6	15.5	2.8	2.0	1.3		3.3	3.5	6.6	4.7
11–16 Nov	SWG	1,200	15.3	19.9	23.0	6.2	16.7	3.6	2.4	1.8	1.3	3.4	3.2	3.2	3.1
15–16 Nov	Tecnè	1,000	14.5	20.7	23.4	7.8	17.1	3.3	1.8	1.6		3.3	3.4	3.1	2.7
13 Nov	Tecnè	1,000	14.5	20.7	23.4	7.9	17.1	3.3	1.9	1.5		3.3	3.4	3.0	2.7
12–13 Nov	Quorum – YouTrend	502	15.4	20.8	23.8	6.9	15.7	3.4	2.2	1.7		2.9	3.0	4.2	3.0
11–12 Nov	Termometro Politico	2,300	14.6	20.5	24.9	5.8	16.2	3.0	1.7	1.3		3.1	3.0	5.9	4.4
10 Nov	EMG	1,488	14.3	20.0	24.8	6.8	16.3	2.7	1.8	1.8	1.2	3.7	4.3	2.3	4.8
9–10 Nov	Demopolis	1,500	15.4	21.0	23.5	6.5	15.4	3.6				2.7	2.8	9.1	2.5
4–9 Nov	SWG	1,200	14.9	20.4	23.3	6.0	16.1	3.8	2.6	2.0	1.1	3.1	3.5	3.2	2.9
6 Nov	Index	800	15.2	20.7	23.8	6.4	16.2	3.5	2.3	1.8	1.2	3.1	3.2	2.6	3.1
6 Nov	Tecnè	1,000	14.4	20.6	23.5	7.8	17.0	3.4	1.8	1.4		3.4	3.5	3.2	2.9
5–6 Nov	Quorum – YouTrend	502	16.0	20.9	24.0	6.4	16.1	3.3	2.2			2.8	3.0	5.3	3.1
2 Nov	EMG	1,425	14.6	20.2	24.8	6.7	16.0	2.8	1.7	1.7	1.2	3.7	4.4	2.2	4.6
28 Oct–2 Nov	SWG	1,200	15.0	20.8	23.8	6.2	15.7	3.6	2.4	1.7	1.2	3.2	3.3	3.1	3.0
29–30 Oct	Tecnè	1,000	14.4	20.8	23.8	7.6	17.1	3.3	1.7	1.5		3.2	3.4	3.2	3.0
29–30 Oct	Quorum – YouTrend	503	15.7	20.8	24.5	6.1	15.8	3.8	1.9			3.1	2.9	5.4	3.7
27–30 Oct	Lab2101	814	15.8	21.8	25.1	6.4	16.0	3.0	1.4	1.4		3.0	3.1	3.0	3.3
29 Oct	Index	800	15.4	20.5	23.5	6.4	16.5	3.6	2.2	1.9	1.3	3.0	3.1	2.6	3.0
28–29 Oct	Ipsos	1,000	15.9	20.7	24.5	7.9	15.9	2.8	2.3	1.9		3.0	2.9	2.2	3.8
26–28 Oct	Demos & Pi	1,017	15.7	21.5	23.0	7.3	16.2	3.3	2.3			2.4	2.6	5.7	1.5
26–28 Oct	Ixè	1,000	15.8	21.6	22.4	7.7	16.9	2.5	1.5	1.4		2.4	2.8	5.0	0.8
25–28 Oct	BiDiMedia	1,492	14.3	22.1	25.0	6.1	15.7	3.1	1.5	1.7	0.6	2.5	2.9	4.5	2.9
27 Oct	EMG	1,525	14.8	20.5	25.0	6.3	16.0	2.8	1.5	1.6	1.1	3.5	4.4	2.5	4.5
27 Oct	Euromedia	800	15.1	19.5	24.0	5.5	15.6	2.6	2.2	1.5		3.8	4.1	6.1	4.5
21–26 Oct	SWG	1,200	15.4	20.4	23.3	6.4	16.2	3.8	2.3	1.9	1.2	3.0	3.2	2.9	2.9
23 Oct	Quorum – YouTrend	500	16.0	20.4	24.8	6.6	16.1	3.4	1.7			2.8	2.7	5.5	4.4
22–23 Oct	Tecnè	1,000	14.5	21.0	24.1	7.4	17.0	3.2	1.6	1.6		3.1	3.4	3.1	3.1
20–21 Oct	EMG	1,672	14.9	20.8	25.2	6.4	15.7	2.9	1.5	1.5	1.0	3.6	4.3	2.2	4.4
20 Oct	Demopolis	1,500	15.2	20.8	24.2	6.0	15.0	3.5				2.8	3.0	9.5	3.4
20 Oct	Euromedia	800	15.5	20.0	24.7	6.2	14.7	2.7	2.1	1.4		3.9	3.0	5.8	4.7
19–20 Oct	Demoskopea	1,000	16.0	20.5	24.5	6.0	16.4	3.2	2.3	2.1		3.0	3.0	3.0	4.0
14–19 Oct	SWG	1,200	15.2	20.5	24.3	6.1	15.7	3.7	2.1	1.7	1.1	3.2	3.4	3.0	3.8
16 Oct	Quorum – YouTrend	500	16.1	20.8	25.1	6.7	15.5	3.5	1.5		0.7	2.5	2.6	5.0	4.3
15–16 Oct	Tecnè	1,000	14.7	21.3	24.0	7.5	16.9	3.1	1.7	1.5		2.8	3.2	3.3	2.7
13 Oct	EMG	1,725	14.8	21.0	25.1	6.4	15.7	2.9	1.4	1.6	1.1	3.5	4.4	2.1	4.1
7–12 Oct	SWG	1,200	15.5	20.5	24.4	5.9	16.0	3.5	2.3	1.8	1.4	3.1	3.0	2.6	3.9
8–9 Oct	Quorum – YouTrend	506	15.3	21.3	25.5	6.7	16.5	3.5	2.0		0.4	3.2	2.1	3.5	4.2
8–9 Oct	Tecnè	1,000	15.2	20.8	24.0	7.6	16.8	3.0	1.8	1.6		2.6	3.4	3.2	3.2
8 Oct	Index	800	15.8	20.8	24.2	6.2	16.3	3.5	2.0	1.8	1.4	3.0	2.9	2.1	3.4
8 Oct	Noto	–	15.0	20.5	25.5	6.0	15.0	1.5	1.5	1.5	1.5	3.0	4.0	5.0	5.0
7–8 Oct	Termometro Politico	2,500	14.8	21.5	26.0	6.0	14.3	2.8	1.4	1.5		3.5	2.6	5.6	4.5
5–8 Oct	Lab2101	1,000	15.0	23.5	26.7	6.0	15.1	3.6	1.3	1.5		3.1	3.0	1.2	3.2
6 Oct	EMG	1,718	14.5	21.1	25.3	6.3	15.7	2.7	1.5	1.6	1.0	3.4	4.3	2.6	4.2
5–6 Oct	Ixè	1,000	16.7	22.1	23.0	6.9	15.6	2.6	1.9	1.4		2.1	2.0	5.7	0.9
30 Sep–5 Oct	SWG	1,200	15.2	20.8	24.8	6.0	15.8	3.4	2.0	1.6	1.3	3.3	2.8	3.0	4.0
2 Oct	Index	800	16.0	20.5	24.0	6.1	16.2	3.5	2.0	2.0	1.4	3.1	3.0	2.2	3.5
1–2 Oct	Tecnè	1,000	15.5	20.4	24.1	8.0	16.7	3.2	1.9	1.5		2.4	3.3	3.0	3.7
30 Sep–1 Oct	Termometro Politico	2,500	14.6	21.3	26.3	5.7	14.5	3.1	1.5	1.3		3.4	2.7	5.6	5.0
23–29 Sep	Lab2101	1,000	14.9	23.3	26.4	6.2	15.6	3.5	1.4	1.7		3.0	3.1	0.9	3.1
23–28 Sep	SWG	1,200	16.0	20.1	23.8	5.8	15.8	3.5	2.1	1.9	1.5	3.4	3.0	3.1	3.7
23–24 Sep	Ipsos	1,000	18.6	19.3	24.0	6.8	16.7	2.2	1.4	2.4		3.0	3.1	2.5	4.7
23–24 Sep	Termometro Politico	2,500	14.8	21.0	26.5	5.5	14.4	3.0	1.7	1.4		3.3	2.9	5.5	5.5
21–24 Sep	BiDiMedia	1,415	14.0	22.2	25.5	5.9	15.4	2.8	1.4	1.8	0.5	2.6	3.1	4.8	3.3
19–21 Sep	Tecnè	5,009	15.7	20.1	26.2	7.5	16.1	2.5	1.8	1.6		1.8	3.5	3.2	6.1
2–3 Sep	Termometro Politico	2,600	14.4	20.5	27.3	5.9	14.6	2.8	1.5	1.4		3.1	2.8	5.7	6.8
29–31 Aug	Tecnè	2,000	16.3	19.8	24.6	7.8	16.5	3.1	1.8	1.6		2.6	2.6	3.3	4.8
26–31 Aug	SWG	1,200	15.8	20.0	26.3	6.3	14.4	3.7	2.0	2.0	1.1	3.2	3.2	2.0	6.3
26–27 Aug	Termometro Politico	2,600	14.4	20.4	27.3	6.2	14.4	2.7	1.4	1.2		3.4	3.0	5.6	6.9
23–27 Aug	BiDiMedia	1,661	15.2	21.0	26.2	6.1	14.4	3.0	1.5	1.6	0.4	2.4	3.1	5.1	5.2
24–26 Aug	Demos & Pi	1,014	16.2	20.7	24.5	7.2	15.4	3.5	2.3			2.1	2.7	5.4	3.8
13–14 Aug	Demoskopea	1,002	19.9	20.5	23.5	6.3	15.5	3.2	2.3	2.1		3.3	3.3	0.1	3.0
5–6 Aug	Termometro Politico	2,100	14.5	20.2	27.4	5.8	14.7	2.8	1.3	1.4		3.0	3.2	5.7	7.2
3–4 Aug	Euromedia	1,000	16.0	20.5	24.9	6.8	14.9	2.1	1.6	1.3	0.8	3.8	2.9	4.4	4.4
29 Jul–3 Aug	SWG	1,200	16.4	19.6	26.5	6.0	14.2	3.6	1.8	1.9	1.2	3.3	3.1	2.4	6.9
30–31 Jul	Tecnè	1,000	15.8	20.2	24.4	8.4	16.3	3.1	2.0	1.6		2.5	2.5	3.2	4.2
29–30 Jul	Termometro Politico	2,000	14.9	20.5	27.1	5.5	14.2	3.0	1.6	1.2		3.2	2.9	5.9	6.6
28–30 Jul	Ixè	1,000	16.7	21.9	22.7	7.9	14.5	3.6	2.5	1.5		2.2	2.2	4.3	0.8
22–27 Jul	SWG	1,200	16.0	19.8	26.3	6.2	13.9	3.8	2.1	1.8	1.3	3.1	3.0	2.7	6.5
23–24 Jul	Tecnè	1,000	15.4	20.3	24.7	8.3	16.0	3.0	2.1	1.5		2.7	2.6	3.4	4.4
22–23 Jul	Termometro Politico	2,200	14.6	20.4	27.6	5.7	14.1	2.9	1.4	1.5		3.0	3.1	5.7	7.2
22–23 Jul	Ipsos	1,000	18.9	19.6	23.1	6.9	18.0	2.9	1.3	2.9		2.5	2.5	1.4	3.5
21–22 Jul	Demopolis	1,500	16.0	21.0	25.4	6.5	15.0	3.4				2.5	3.2	7.0	4.4
20–21 Jul	Ixè	1,000	15.8	21.8	23.7	7.9	13.9	3.4	2.6	1.6		2.1	2.3	4.9	1.9
20 Jul	Euromedia	–	15.8	20.8	26.5	6.0	13.5	2.1	1.6	1.2	0.8	3.6	3.4	4.7	5.7
15–20 Jul	SWG	1,200	15.6	19.3	26.5	6.0	14.2	3.6	2.4	1.9	1.2	3.3	3.0	3.0	7.2
16–17 Jul	Tecnè	1,000	15.0	20.2	24.9	8.3	16.0	2.9	1.9	1.6		2.9	2.7	3.6	4.7
15–16 Jul	Termometro Politico	2,200	14.9	20.7	27.8	5.5	14.4	2.6	1.4	1.4		3.2	2.8	5.3	7.1
13 Jul	Analisi Politica	1,000	16.0	21.0	26.0	7.0	14.0	3.0	2.0	1.0	1.0	3.0	3.0	3.0	5.0
8–13 Jul	SWG	1,200	15.3	19.6	26.3	6.3	14.5	3.7	2.2	1.7	1.1	3.1	3.2	3.0	6.7
6–7 Jul	Ixè	1,000	15.4	22.0	23.9	7.2	13.8	3.0	3.1	1.9		1.6	2.6	5.5	1.9
5–6 Jul	Tecnè	1,000	14.8	20.2	25.6	8.2	15.8	2.5	1.7	1.7		2.8	3.1	3.6	5.4
1–6 Jul	SWG	1,200	15.7	20.0	26.6	5.9	14.0	3.8	2.0	1.8	1.3	3.2	2.9	2.8	6.6
3–5 Jul	Lab2101	837	16.7	22.4	26.6	6.4	14.4	3.4	1.4	1.7		2.9	3.4	0.7	4.2
2–3 Jul	Tecnè	1,000	14.6	20.2	25.5	8.2	15.9	2.5	1.7	1.8		2.9	3.0	3.7	5.3
1–2 Jul	Termometro Politico	2,900	14.9	20.8	27.9	5.8	14.2	2.6	1.8	1.5		3.3	2.8	4.4	7.1
30 Jun–2 Jul	BiDiMedia	1,496	15.0	21.4	26.6	5.9	14.1	2.6	1.5	1.7	0.4	2.6	3.5	4.7	5.2
24–29 Jun	SWG	1,200	16.0	20.3	26.6	5.6	14.2	3.5	2.5	2.0	1.2	2.9	3.0	2.2	6.3
26 Jun	Euromedia	–	16.0	20.2	25.5	7.3	13.6	2.3	1.6	1.2	0.7	3.5	3.4	4.7	5.3
25–26 Jun	Tecnè	1,000	14.5	19.8	25.8	8.2	16.0	2.6	1.7	1.9		2.6	2.9	4.0	6.0
24–26 Jun	Demopolis	1,500	15.8	21.2	26.0	6.0	15.0	3.4				2.5	3.2	6.9	4.8
25 Jun	Noto	–	17.0	19.5	28.5	7.0	14.0	1.5	0.5	1.5	1.5	3.0	3.5	2.5	9.0
24–25 Jun	Termometro Politico	2,400	15.3	20.5	28.4	5.9	14.5	3.5	1.7	1.3		3.2	2.9	2.8	7.9
23–25 Jun	Ipsos	1,000	18.0	20.4	24.0	7.2	16.3	2.3	1.4	1.9		2.8	2.9	2.8	3.6
23 Jun	EMG	1,623	16.1	20.0	26.8	6.8	14.4	2.0	1.6	1.8		3.6	4.8	2.1	6.8
22–23 Jun	Ixè	1,000	15.6	22.2	23.8	7.5	14.0	2.4	2.7	2.0		1.2	3.0	5.6	1.6
17–22 Jun	SWG	1,200	15.9	19.3	26.9	6.0	13.6	3.8	2.5	2.4	1.5	3.1	2.9	2.1	7.6
18–19 Jun	Tecnè	1,000	14.5	19.7	25.9	8.3	15.9	2.5	1.6	2.0		2.8	3.0	3.8	6.2
17–18 Jun	Termometro Politico	2,900	15.0	20.3	28.8	5.6	14.7	2.3	1.5	1.5		2.9	3.3	4.1	8.5
17–18 Jun	Euromedia	800	15.6	19.6	25.5	7.9	13.2	2.6	1.6	1.2	0.4	3.6	3.5	5.3	5.9
15–17 Jun	Demos & Pi	1,006	16.8	21.2	25.2	7.3	14.3	3.7	2.8			2.2	2.5	4.0	4.0
16 Jun	EMG	1,546	16.4	19.9	26.6	6.7	14.0	2.3	1.5	1.8		3.4	4.9	2.5	6.7
15–16 Jun	Ixè	1,000	16.1	22.0	24.3	7.9	14.2	2.0	2.2	2.2		0.9	2.7	5.5	2.3
15 Jun	Euromedia	–	15.5	19.7	24.7	7.9	13.4	2.9	1.8	1.5	0.8	3.7	3.3	4.8	5.0
10–15 Jun	SWG	1,200	16.2	19.0	26.9	6.1	14.1	3.7	2.3	2.2	1.3	3.0	2.9	2.3	7.9
11–12 Jun	Tecnè	1,000	14.8	19.8	25.9	8.4	15.5	2.6	1.8	1.7		3.0	2.9	3.6	6.1
11 Jun	Noto	–	16.0	19.5	28.0	7.5	14.0	1.0	0.5	1.5	1.5	3.0	3.5	4.0	8.5
10–11 Jun	Ipsos	1,200	17.1	21.3	23.5	7.0	17.5	2.4	1.2	1.5		2.7	2.3	3.5	2.2
10–11 Jun	Termometro Politico	2,200	14.8	20.8	28.3	5.9	15.0	2.5	1.4	1.3		2.9	3.0	4.1	7.5
9–11 Jun	BiDiMedia	1,617	15.3	20.8	27.2	6.1	13.4	2.8	1.7	1.7	0.5	2.5	3.5	4.5	6.4
9–10 Jun	EMG	1,624	16.0	20.0	26.8	7.0	14.2	2.1	1.4	1.6		3.0	5.0	2.9	6.8
8–9 Jun	Ixè	1,000	17.2	21.4	25.0	7.6	14.4	2.0	1.7	2.3		1.5	1.9	5.0	3.6
3–8 Jun	SWG	1,200	15.8	19.1	27.3	5.6	14.4	4.0	2.2	2.1	1.1	2.7	3.0	2.7	8.2
4–5 Jun	Tecnè	1,000	14.9	20.0	26.2	8.2	15.4	2.5	1.9	1.6		2.7	2.8	3.8	6.2
4 Jun	Euromedia	800	15.8	19.7	25.3	7.8	13.7	2.8	1.8	1.6	0.7	3.4	3.2	4.2	5.6
3–4 Jun	Termometro Politico	3,300	15.2	20.8	28.8	5.6	14.5	2.2	1.6	1.5		2.7	3.2	3.9	8.0
1–2 Jun	EMG	1,762	15.8	20.3	27.2	6.9	14.5	2.2	1.5	1.6		2.6	4.6	2.8	6.9
27 May–1 Jun	SWG	1,200	16.0	19.5	27.0	6.0	13.9	3.7	2.4	1.9	1.1	2.8	3.0	2.7	7.5
27–30 May	Quorum – YouTrend	1,009	15.5	21.6	26.2	6.5	15.0	2.7	2.3		0.1	2.4	3.1	4.6	4.6
26–30 May	Scenari Politici – Winpoll	1,590	14.4	22.0	27.5	5.9	15.9	2.3	0.9	1.7		2.4	2.5	4.5	5.5
28–29 May	Tecnè	1,000	15.0	20.3	26.0	8.2	15.0	2.7	1.8	1.7		2.5	3.1	3.7	5.7
28 May	Index	800	15.5	21.2	25.4	6.9	14.5	3.5	2.1	2.0	1.1	2.9	2.5	2.4	4.2
27–28 May	Termometro Politico	3,300	15.3	21.1	29.5	5.7	14.0	2.4	1.4	1.3		2.3	3.5	3.5	8.4
26 May	EMG	1,758	15.7	20.6	27.1	6.8	14.6	2.2	1.5	1.7		2.6	4.7	2.5	6.5
25–26 May	Ixè	1,000	17.5	20.9	25.3	7.4	14.3	2.4	1.6	2.4		1.5	1.5	5.2	4.4
24–25 May	Tecnè	1,000	15.2	20.8	25.8	8.1	14.9	2.7	1.7	1.7		2.4	3.2	3.5	5.0
20–25 May	SWG	1,200	15.7	20.2	26.9	6.3	14.5	3.4	2.1	1.7	1.3	2.9	2.7	2.3	6.7
21–22 May	Tecnè	1,000	15.1	20.7	25.9	8.1	14.9	2.8	1.6	1.6		2.4	3.3	3.6	5.2
21 May	Euromedia	800	15.5	20.5	24.9	7.7	14.5	2.8	1.8	1.2	0.5	3.4	2.7	4.5	4.4
23 Apr–21 May	Ipsos	1,000	16.7	21.2	24.3	7.4	16.2	1.8	1.3	1.8		2.2	3.0	4.1	3.1
20–21 May	Euromedia	2,000	15.4	20.8	24.6	7.8	14.0	2.8	1.6	1.5	0.8	3.2	3.0	4.5	3.8
20–21 May	Termometro Politico	2,700	15.0	21.5	29.2	5.9	14.1	2.5	1.3	1.5		2.3	3.3	3.4	7.7
19 May	EMG	1,725	15.4	20.9	26.9	6.8	14.3	2.3	1.6	1.8		2.6	5.0	2.4	6.0
18–19 May	Ixè	1,000	17.2	21.6	24.6	7.2	14.7	2.5	1.6	2.2		1.8	2.1	4.5	3.0
13–18 May	SWG	1,200	16.0	20.6	27.0	5.7	14.0	3.7	2.2	1.5	1.1	2.6	3.0	2.6	6.4
14–16 May	Piepoli	–	15.0	21.5	28.5	6.5	13.5	2.0	1.5	1.0		2.0	4.0	4.5	7.0
14–15 May	Tecnè	1,000	15.2	20.8	26.2	8.1	14.7	2.7	1.6	1.7		2.0	3.4	3.6	5.4
14 May	Noto	–	15.0	21.0	27.0	7.0	14.0	2.0	1.0	1.5	1.5	3.0	3.5	3.5	6.0
14 May	Index	–	15.3	21.6	25.8	6.7	14.1	3.4	2.0	2.0	1.1	2.5	3.2	2.3	4.2
13–14 May	Termometro Politico	3,300	14.8	21.6	29.4	6.2	14.3	2.7	1.5	1.1		2.2	3.0	3.2	7.8
12–14 May	BiDiMedia	1,781	15.0	21.9	26.8	6.3	13.1	2.8	1.6	1.6	0.6	2.1	3.6	4.6	4.9
12–13 May	Demopolis	1,500	16.0	21.0	26.0	6.0	14.2	3.5					3.0	10.3	5.0
12–13 May	EMG	1,623	15.4	20.8	27.3	6.6	14.2	2.2	1.6	2.0		2.4	5.0	2.5	6.5
11–12 May	Ixè	1,000	16.9	22.0	24.6	7.5	14.2	3.0	2.1	1.8		2.0	2.6	3.3	2.6
6–11 May	SWG	1,200	16.7	19.5	27.8	6.0	14.6	3.1	2.0	1.8	1.1	2.5	2.7	2.2	8.3
7–8 May	Tecnè	1,000	14.9	20.9	26.6	8.0	14.6	2.8	1.7	1.8		1.8	3.5	3.4	5.7
7 May	Index	800	14.9	21.6	26.1	6.6	13.7	3.5	2.0	2.0	1.0	2.5	3.5	2.6	4.5
6–7 May	Termometro Politico	3,600	15.0	21.4	29.5	6.0	14.0	2.6	1.5	1.3		2.0	2.9	3.8	8.1
6 May	Euromedia	800	15.2	21.3	26.0	7.3	14.0	2.4	1.7	1.4	0.7	2.5	2.8	4.7	4.7
5–6 May	EMG	1,589	15.1	20.7	27.9	6.4	13.9	2.2	1.5	2.1		2.3	5.0	2.9	7.2
4–5 May	Ixè	1,000	16.8	22.9	24.9	7.2	13.8	2.8	2.1	2.0		1.1	2.6	3.8	2.0
4 May	Piepoli	1,000	19.0	22.0	25.0	6.0	13.0	2.0				2.0	3.0	8.0	3.0
29 Apr–4 May	SWG	1,200	16.2	20.2	27.3	5.3	14.9	3.3	1.9	1.8	1.0	2.5	3.0	2.6	7.1
30 Apr	Noto	–	15.0	21.5	27.5	7.0	14.0	1.5	1.5	1.0	1.5	3.0	4.0	2.5	6.0
30 Apr	Tecnè	1,000	14.3	21.0	27.2	8.0	14.4	2.7	1.7	1.9		1.9	3.6	3.3	6.2
29–30 Apr	Demopolis	1,500	16.5	21.0	27.0	5.6	14.0	3.4					3.0	9.5	6.0
29–30 Apr	Termometro Politico	4,400	14.7	21.6	29.8	5.9	13.9	2.4	1.3	1.5		2.1	3.2	3.6	8.2
28–30 Apr	Demos & Pi	1,006	16.3	21.8	26.6	6.2	13.6	3.6	2.0			2.5	2.2	5.2	4.8
29 Apr	Index	800	14.7	21.6	26.6	6.8	13.2	3.8	2.0	1.9	1.0	2.4	3.8	2.2	5.0
28–29 Apr	EMG	1,635	14.7	20.7	28.4	6.6	13.7	2.5	1.5	2.0		2.3	5.1	2.5	7.7
27–28 Apr	Ixè	1,000	16.4	22.9	25.6	7.9	12.0	3.2	2.0	2.3		1.2	2.9	3.6	2.7
22–27 Apr	SWG	1,200	15.4	20.3	28.2	6.1	13.8	3.4	2.1	1.9	1.0	2.3	3.4	2.1	7.9
23–24 Apr	Tecnè	1,000	14.0	21.1	27.9	7.7	14.3	2.8	1.6	1.8		2.0	3.4	3.4	6.8
22–23 Apr	Ipsos	1,000	18.6	21.3	25.4	7.5	14.1	2.0	1.7	1.9		1.4	3.1	3.0	4.1
22–23 Apr	Termometro Politico	2,200	14.2	21.8	30.1	5.7	13.9	2.3	1.5	1.5		2.4	3.3	3.3	8.3
21–23 Apr	Scenari Politici – Winpoll	1,643	14.1	22.4	29.2	5.6	13.5	2.4	1.3	1.7		2.8	3.3	3.7	6.8
21–22 Apr	EMG	1,789	14.7	20.9	28.8	6.1	13.8	2.4	1.7	1.9		2.3	5.1	2.3	7.9
20–21 Apr	Ixè	1,000	16.4	22.9	25.9	7.7	12.5	3.6	1.5	2.1		1.0	1.9	4.5	3.0
15–20 Apr	SWG	1,200	14.4	20.0	29.5	5.8	13.3	3.5	2.0	1.9	1.3	2.6	3.1	2.6	9.5
16–17 Apr	Tecnè	1,000	14.0	21.4	28.3	7.3	14.5	3.0	1.4	1.9		1.6	3.0	3.6	6.9
16 Apr	Index	–	14.7	21.8	27.0	6.3	12.9	3.9	2.0	1.8	0.7	2.3	4.5	2.1	5.2
15–16 Apr	Euromedia	800	14.7	21.0	27.5	6.4	13.8	2.3	1.5	1.6	1.0	2.2	3.2	4.8	6.5
15–16 Apr	Termometro Politico	3,400	14.9	22.2	30.5	5.3	13.2	2.6	1.1	1.3		2.1	3.2	3.6	8.3
14–16 Apr	BiDiMedia	1,441	14.8	21.4	27.6	5.8	12.9	2.8	1.8	1.8	0.5	2.2	3.7	4.7	6.2
14–15 Apr	EMG	1,802	15.1	21.1	29.2	5.9	13.7	2.3	1.7	1.8		2.3	5.0	1.9	8.1
8–13 Apr	SWG	1,200	14.2	19.9	29.7	5.3	12.8	3.8	2.4	2.1	1.3	2.4	3.6	2.5	9.8
9–10 Apr	Tecnè	1,000	14.1	21.8	28.5	7.0	14.5	2.8	1.5	1.8		1.7	2.8	3.5	6.7
9 Apr	Index	–	14.6	22.1	26.9	6.2	12.9	3.8	2.1	1.8	0.5	2.2	4.5	2.4	4.8
8–9 Apr	Termometro Politico	2,200	14.2	21.9	30.8	5.7	12.8	2.3	1.3	1.7		2.5	3.5	3.3	8.9
7–8 Apr	EMG	1,756	15.0	21.4	29.1	5.7	13.8	2.2	1.8	1.8		2.2	5.0	2.0	7.7
6–7 Apr	Ixè	1,000	16.0	22.6	26.0	7.5	12.5	3.5	1.8	2.2		1.0	2.0	4.9	3.4
1–6 Apr	SWG	1,200	14.5	20.1	30.7	5.2	12.0	3.5	2.3	2.3	1.1	2.5	3.4	2.4	10.6
2–3 Apr	Tecnè	1,000	13.7	21.8	29.0	6.9	14.4	2.7	1.6	1.8		1.6	2.9	3.6	7.2
2 Apr	Index	–	14.5	21.9	27.5	6.2	12.8	3.7	2.0	1.9	0.6	2.1	4.5	2.3	5.6
1–2 Apr	Termometro Politico	2,200	13.8	21.8	30.8	5.6	12.7	2.4	1.5	1.5		2.8	3.2	3.9	9.0
31 Mar–1 Apr	EMG	1,802	14.7	21.3	30.3	5.8	13.1	2.1	1.8	1.8		1.9	5.0	2.2	9.0
30–31 Mar	Ixè	1,000	15.6	22.6	26.2	7.4	12.8	3.9	2.0	1.8		1.6	1.9	4.2	3.6
25–30 Mar	SWG	1,200	14.9	19.2	31.0	5.3	12.3	3.3	2.2	2.2	1.0	2.7	3.3	2.6	11.8
26–27 Mar	Tecnè	1,000	13.6	22.0	28.9	6.9	14.2	2.6	1.7	1.6		1.7	3.1	3.7	6.9
25–26 Mar	Termometro Politico	2,200	13.6	21.7	32.1	5.0	11.8	2.1	1.5	1.5		2.8	3.4	4.5	10.4
24–26 Mar	Ipsos	1,000	15.3	20.6	31.1	6.8	13.3	2.1	1.0	2.0		1.0	3.5	3.3	10.5
25 Mar	Euromedia	800	14.5	21.5	27.7	6.7	13.5	2.1	1.8	1.3	0.4	2.3	3.5	4.7	6.2
24–25 Mar	EMG	1,756	14.9	21.0	30.1	6.0	12.7	2.3	1.9	1.7		1.9	5.3	2.2	9.1
23–24 Mar	Ixè	1,000	15.1	22.9	26.5	7.0	12.7	3.5	2.6	1.6	0.7	1.3	2.2	3.9	3.6
18–23 Mar	SWG	1,200	13.8	20.3	30.2	5.7	11.8	3.7	2.2	2.3	1.3	2.6	3.2	2.9	9.9
19–21 Mar	Scenari Politici – Winpoll	2,000	12.8	23.1	30.6	5.0	13.7	3.1	1.5	2.2		2.0	2.8	3.2	7.5
19–20 Mar	Tecnè	1,000	13.7	22.3	28.6	6.8	14.1	2.6	1.8	1.7		1.8	3.0	3.6	6.3
19 Mar	Noto	–	14.0	21.5	29.5	5.7	14.0	1.0	1.0	1.5	1.3	2.0	4.0	4.5	8.0
18–19 Mar	Termometro Politico	2,200	14.5	20.9	31.2	5.5	12.1	2.4	1.4	1.6		2.4	4.1	3.9	10.3
17–18 Mar	EMG	1,812	14.7	21.3	29.7	6.3	12.5	2.5	1.8	1.8		1.9	5.4	2.1	8.4
16–17 Mar	Demos & Pi	1,028	14.6	21.0	28.8	5.9	13.5	3.5	2.3			2.0	3.3	5.1	7.8
16–17 Mar	Ixè	1,000	14.9	22.5	27.0	6.6	13.0	3.8	2.4	1.6	0.7	1.0	2.4	4.1	4.5
11–16 Mar	SWG	1,200	13.2	20.5	31.0	5.3	12.0	3.5	2.4	2.2	1.2	2.9	3.2	2.6	10.5
12–13 Mar	Tecnè	1,000	13.7	22.0	28.7	6.6	13.7	2.4	1.9	1.8		2.0	3.3	3.9	6.7
11–12 Mar	Termometro Politico	2,200	15.4	21.0	31.6	5.4	12.4	2.4	1.4	1.6		1.8	3.9	3.1	10.6
10–11 Mar	EMG	1,722	14.3	21.1	29.4	6.1	12.7	2.8	1.9	2.0	0.7	2.2	5.3	1.5	8.3
9–11 Mar	BiDiMedia	1,296	14.0	21.2	28.7	6.0	11.9	3.0	1.6	1.9	0.5	2.4	4.0	4.8	7.5
9–10 Mar	Ixè	1,000	15.6	22.5	27.0	6.1	13.4	3.3	2.3	1.9	1.0	1.1	2.6	3.2	4.5
4–9 Mar	SWG	1,200	13.4	19.6	30.6	5.5	12.0	3.8	2.3	2.4	1.1	2.9	3.5	2.9	11.0
6–7 Mar	Scenari Politici – Winpoll	1,000	12.5	22.9	31.1	4.6	13.3	2.9	1.4	2.3		2.1	3.0	3.9	8.2
5–6 Mar	Tecnè	1,000	13.6	21.5	29.6	6.8	13.4	2.5	2.0	1.7		2.0	3.2	3.7	8.1
5 Mar	Index	–	14.8	20.0	30.3	6.1	12.1	3.5	2.1	2.2	0.9	2.3	3.5	2.2	10.3
4–5 Mar	Termometro Politico	2,200	15.3	20.7	32.5	5.0	11.6	2.0	1.5	1.6		2.0	3.9	3.9	11.8
3–4 Mar	EMG	1,754	14.7	21.3	29.6	6.1	12.4	2.9	1.8	1.9	0.7	2.2	5.1	1.3	8.3
3 Mar	Euromedia	800	14.6	21.0	28.5	6.5	12.9	2.3	2.0	1.3	0.3	2.6	3.8	4.2	7.5
2–3 Mar	Ixè	1,000	15.7	22.0	27.2	6.2	13.4	2.8	2.3	2.2	0.9	1.5	2.8	3.0	5.2
26 Feb–2 Mar	SWG	1,200	13.7	19.9	30.9	5.7	12.1	3.6	2.1	2.2	1.2	2.8	3.2	2.6	11.0
25–29 Feb	Piepoli	504	14.5	21.0	30.5	6.5	11.0	2.0	2.0	1.5		1.5	5.0	4.5	9.5
27–28 Feb	Tecnè	1,000	13.4	21.2	30.2	7.1	13.1	2.6	1.8	1.5		2.1	3.6	3.4	9.0
27 Feb	Ipsos	1,000	14.0	19.6	31.6	6.3	13.3	1.8	1.6	2.5		1.6	3.5	4.2	12.0
26–27 Feb	Termometro Politico	2,200	15.3	20.9	32.6	5.1	11.5	2.0	1.4	1.5		2.1	4.0	3.6	11.7
25–26 Feb	EMG	1,722	14.6	21.2	30.1	6.4	12.0	2.8	1.9	1.8	0.8	2.1	5.0	1.3	8.9
24–25 Feb	Ixè	1,000	15.4	21.6	27.7	5.9	13.7	2.5	2.6	2.0	0.6	1.7	3.0	3.3	6.1
19–24 Feb	SWG	1,200	13.4	20.1	31.3	5.4	11.3	3.3	2.2	2.3	1.3	3.1	3.8	2.5	11.2
20–22 Feb	Piepoli	503	15.0	20.5	30.5	6.5	10.5	2.0	2.5	1.5		1.0	5.0	5.0	10.0
20–21 Feb	Tecnè	1,000	13.3	21.0	30.6	7.1	12.6	2.5	1.7	1.6		2.4	3.9	3.3	9.6
19–20 Feb	Termometro Politico	3,100	15.2	20.4	32.2	5.6	11.2	2.3	1.5	1.5		2.3	4.5	3.3	11.8
19 Feb	Index	800	14.2	20.2	31.1	5.9	11.6	3.1	1.9	2.0	1.0	2.3	4.1	2.6	10.9
18–19 Feb	EMG	2,000	14.4	21.5	30.1	6.3	11.9	2.6	1.9	1.7	0.8	2.2	5.0	1.6	8.6
17–18 Feb	Euromedia	800	14.4	20.3	31.0	6.2	11.8	2.5	1.0	1.5	0.2	2.7	5.0	3.4	10.7
17–18 Feb	Ixè	1,000	14.9	20.5	27.5	6.9	12.9	3.2	2.8	1.8	0.7	1.4	3.0	4.4	7.0
16–18 Feb	Demopolis	2,000	14.5	20.8	31.0	5.1	12.4	3.2					4.0	9.0	10.2
16–17 Feb	Tecnè	1,000	13.4	20.8	30.4	7.2	12.5	2.6	1.9	1.8		2.4	3.9	3.1	9.6
12–17 Feb	SWG	1,200	13.0	20.6	32.4	5.1	11.3	2.9	1.9	2.3	1.2	3.0	4.2	2.1	11.8
13–14 Feb	Tecnè	1,000	13.5	20.8	30.6	7.3	12.2	2.6	1.9	1.7		2.3	4.0	3.1	9.8
13 Feb	Demopolis	–	14.8	20.2	30.0	6.0	11.0	3.0					4.5	10.5	9.8
12–13 Feb	Termometro Politico	4,000	15.1	20.0	33.1	5.2	11.3	2.1	1.4	1.2		2.0	4.9	3.7	13.1
11–13 Feb	BiDiMedia	1,589	14.2	20.8	29.8	5.6	11.0	2.3	1.4	2.0	0.7	2.3	4.2	5.7	9.0
10–13 Feb	Demos & Pi	1,019	14.4	20.6	29.2	6.2	13.1	3.6	2.6				3.9	6.4	8.6
12 Feb	Index	800	15.0	20.0	30.9	5.9	11.3	3.1	2.0	2.0	1.0	2.1	4.1	2.6	10.9
11–12 Feb	EMG	1,518	14.2	21.5	29.9	6.2	11.6	2.6	1.8	1.9	1.1	2.5	5.1	1.6	8.4
10–11 Feb	Ixè	1,000	14.9	20.1	28.0	6.7	12.7	3.0	2.8	2.0	0.9	1.2	3.2	4.5	7.9
5–10 Feb	SWG	1,500	14.0	20.7	32.2	5.4	10.8	2.8	2.0	2.1	1.2	2.8	4.2	1.8	11.5
6–7 Feb	Tecnè	1,000	13.8	20.4	31.0	7.5	11.9	2.5	1.8	1.8		2.4	3.9	3.0	10.6
6 Feb	Index	800	15.2	19.2	31.5	5.9	11.1	3.3	2.0	2.0	0.9	2.2	4.2	2.5	12.3
4–6 Feb	Termometro Politico	3,200	15.6	20.2	32.5	5.8	10.6	3.3	1.4	1.4		2.2	4.3	2.7	12.3
4–6 Feb	EMG	1,460	14.1	21.3	30.0	6.1	11.6	2.5	1.8	1.8	1.0	2.6	5.2	2.0	8.7
3–4 Feb	Ixè	1,000	15.2	19.8	28.0	7.0	12.4	2.8	3.0	2.4	0.8	1.6	3.2	3.8	8.2
29 Jan–3 Feb	SWG	1,500	13.9	19.7	33.3	6.3	10.2	3.1	1.9	2.0	1.1	2.6	4.1	1.8	13.6
30 Jan–2 Feb	Scenari Politici – Winpoll	1,000	12.7	22.6	31.8	4.8	11.6	2.3	1.1	1.8		2.6	3.8	4.9	9.2
30–31 Jan	Tecnè	1,000	14.3	20.2	31.1	7.5	11.7	2.6	1.7	1.8		2.5	3.7	2.9	10.9
29–31 Jan	Piepoli	505	15.5	20.0	30.5	6.5	10.0	2.0	2.5	1.5		1.0	4.5	6.0	10.5
29–30 Jan	Termometro Politico	2,300	16.0	20.4	33.4	5.4	10.6	3.3	1.8	1.1		1.9	3.7	2.4	13.0
28–30 Jan	Ipsos	1,000	14.0	20.3	32.0	6.5	12.0	2.6	1.1	1.5		2.3	4.3	3.4	11.7
29 Jan	Index	800	15.4	19.0	31.4	6.0	11.2	3.2	1.9	2.0	1.0	2.3	4.0	2.6	12.4
28–29 Jan	EMG	1,589	14.3	21.2	30.1	6.1	11.5	2.5	1.8	1.8	0.9	2.7	5.1	2.0	8.9
27–28 Jan	Ixè	1,000	15.9	20.0	28.2	6.9	12.0	2.9	3.2	2.4	0.6	1.3	3.6	3.0	8.2
22–26 Jan	SWG	1,500	14.9	17.5	33.0	6.0	10.6	3.5	2.2	2.1	1.4	2.5	4.6	1.7	15.5
23–24 Jan	Tecnè	1,000	15.1	19.4	31.7	7.8	11.0	2.5	1.8	2.0		2.4	3.6	2.7	12.3
22 Jan	Index	800	16.0	18.7	31.8	6.5	10.9	2.9	1.7	1.9	0.9	2.2	4.2	2.3	13.1
21–22 Jan	Termometro Politico	2,400	15.8	19.1	32.5	6.2	11.1	2.3	1.6	1.3	0.6	2.5	3.9	3.1	13.4
20–21 Jan	Ixè	1,000	16.1	19.9	28.7	7.3	11.3	3.1	3.4	1.9	0.6	1.4	3.9	2.4	8.8
19–20 Jan	Tecnè	1,000	15.3	19.5	31.8	7.9	10.8							14.7	12.3
15–20 Jan	SWG	1,500	15.6	18.2	33.2	5.2	10.9	3.0	2.0	1.9	1.2	2.6	4.5	1.7	15.0
10–17 Jan	Tecnè	1,000	15.3	19.1	32.2	8.0	10.7	2.6	1.7	1.8		2.3	3.7	2.6	13.1
15–16 Jan	Termometro Politico	2,300	16.0	19.4	32.9	5.8	10.6	2.0	1.4	1.4	0.5	2.1	4.6	3.3	13.5
14–16 Jan	BiDiMedia	1,455	16.4	19.0	30.4	6.2	10.1	2.0	1.5	1.6	0.7	2.1	4.9	5.1	11.4
15 Jan	Index	800	15.8	18.9	31.5	6.6	10.5	2.8	1.6	2.0	0.9	2.1	4.4	2.9	12.6
14 Jan	EMG	1,688	15.6	20.0	30.0	6.7	11.0	2.0	2.1	1.8	1.1	2.8	4.6	2.3	10.0
13–14 Jan	Ixè	1,000	15.9	20.0	29.0	7.0	10.9	3.6	2.5	1.6	0.8	1.0	4.2	3.5	9.0
13 Jan	Euromedia	800	15.4	18.9	30.2	6.3	10.8	1.8	1.3	2.4	0.4	3.0	5.0	4.5	11.3
12–13 Jan	Tecnè	1,000	15.5	19.3	31.7	8.0	10.8	2.7	1.6	1.7		2.3	3.7	2.7	12.4
8–13 Jan	SWG	1,500	15.2	18.4	32.9	5.8	10.4	3.1	1.6	2.2	1.0	2.9	4.8	1.7	14.5
9–10 Jan	Tecnè	1,000	15.4	19.3	31.9	8.1	10.6	2.7	1.6	1.7		2.1	3.9	2.7	12.6
8–10 Jan	Piepoli	505	16.5	19.5	31.0	6.5	10.0	2.0	2.5	1.5		1.5	4.5	4.5	11.5
9 Jan	Index	800	16.0	18.8	31.3	6.7	10.5	2.9	1.6	2.1	1.0	2.0	4.3	2.8	12.5
8–9 Jan	Termometro Politico	3,500	16.1	19.1	33.1	6.1	10.7	3.2	1.5	1.2	0.4	1.8	4.9	1.9	14.0
7–8 Jan	EMG	1,700	15.9	19.9	30.4	7.0	10.6	2.0	1.9	1.6	1.0	2.8	4.5	2.4	10.5
3–7 Jan	Ixè	1,000	16.2	20.0	29.5	7.3	10.7	3.0	2.3	1.3	1.0	1.3	3.6	3.8	9.5

=== 2019 ===
Fieldwork date	Polling firm	Sample size	M5S	PD	Lega	FI	FdI	LeU	+E	EV	C!	A (Note: Polls before 21 November 2019 refer to it as We Are Europeans (SE).)	IV	Others	Lead
20–24 Dec	MG Research	807	16.1	19.2	33.1	5.8	10.4		2.1			3.1	4.5	5.7	13.9
22–23 Dec	Tecnè	1,000	15.9	19.1	31.8	7.8	10.3	2.7	1.6	1.7		2.4	4.0	2.7	12.7
18–23 Dec	SWG	1,500	15.7	17.0	32.9	5.5	10.5	3.7	1.6	2.0	1.0	3.3	4.7	2.1	15.9
19–20 Dec	Tecnè	1,000	16.0	19.1	32.4	7.7	10.4	2.4	1.8	1.5		2.2	4.0	2.5	13.3
18–19 Dec	Termometro Politico	3,000	15.4	18.5	35.2	5.3	10.3	2.2	1.1	1.4	0.4	2.4	4.9	2.9	16.7
18–19 Dec	Ipsos	1,000	17.7	18.2	31.5	7.4	10.3	1.7	1.2	1.8		1.5	5.3	3.4	13.3
18 Dec	Index	800	16.0	18.9	31.8	6.8	10.3	2.9	1.5	2.0	1.0	2.1	4.4	2.3	12.9
17–18 Dec	Demopolis	1,500	16.4	19.0	31.0	5.8	10.6	3.0					4.5	9.7	12.0
17–18 Dec	EMG	1,623	16.1	19.6	31.2	6.7	10.6	2.0	1.9	1.6	1.0	2.3	5.0	2.0	11.6
16–17 Dec	Ixè	1,000	16.0	20.2	29.9	7.0	10.5	3.3	2.5	1.5	1.0	1.3	3.6	3.2	9.7
16 Dec	Euromedia	800	15.8	17.3	31.0	6.9	10.7	2.2	1.5	1.8	0.6	2.7	5.0	4.5	13.7
11–16 Dec	SWG	1,500	15.7	17.5	32.2	5.7	10.7	3.5	1.4	2.3	1.0	3.0	5.1	1.9	14.7
12–13 Dec	Tecnè	1,000	15.8	18.8	33.5	7.9	10.3	2.5	1.7	1.4		2.1	3.8	2.2	14.7
11–13 Dec	BiDiMedia	1,406	17.0	18.8	31.8	5.8	9.5	1.8	1.6	1.5	0.8	2.1	4.8	4.5	13.0
12 Dec	Noto	–	17.5	18.0	31.5	6.5	10.5	1.5	1.5	1.0	1.7	2.7	3.5	4.1	13.5
11–12 Dec	Tecnè	1,000	15.7	18.9	33.4	7.9	10.2	2.5	1.7	1.5		2.0	3.9	2.3	14.5
11 Dec	Index	800	16.2	19.2	32.2	6.7	9.8	2.8	1.5	1.9	1.1	1.8	4.6	2.2	13.0
10–11 Dec	EMG	1,578	15.7	19.3	32.0	6.7	10.4	1.9	2.0	1.5	1.0	2.0	5.2	2.3	12.7
9–10 Dec	Ixè	1,000	16.3	20.8	30.6	7.6	10.6	2.9	2.5	1.2		0.9	3.3	3.3	9.8
8–9 Dec	Tecnè	1,000	15.6	18.6	34.1	8.0	10.3	2.3	1.7	1.4		1.8	4.0	2.2	15.5
4–9 Dec	SWG	1,500	15.5	18.0	33.0	5.3	9.8	3.2	1.5	2.2	1.2	3.5	4.6	2.2	15.0
6 Dec	Noto	1,000	17.0	18.0	33.0	6.0	9.5	1.0	1.0	1.0	1.7	2.5	5.0	4.3	15.0
5–6 Dec	Tecnè	1,000	15.6	18.9	34.7	7.9	10.0	2.4	1.8	1.3		1.5	3.9	2.0	15.8
2–6 Dec	Demos & Pi	1,276	18.1	18.7	29.5	6.5	11.3	3.2	2.4				3.5	6.8	10.8
4–5 Dec	Termometro Politico	2,500	15.5	18.6	34.9	5.5	10.2	2.2	1.6	1.3	0.5	1.7	5.3	2.7	16.3
4 Dec	Euromedia	800	15.5	17.5	31.5	7.2	10.3	2.1	1.4	1.3	0.4	2.8	5.5	4.5	14.0
4 Dec	Index	800	16.2	19.1	32.7	6.6	9.8	2.6	1.6	1.8	1.0	1.6	4.9	2.1	13.6
3–4 Dec	EMG	1,623	16.3	19.5	32.5	6.9	10.1	1.8	1.6	1.2	0.9	1.8	5.3	2.1	13.0
2–3 Dec	Ixè	1,000	15.9	20.7	31.2	7.4	11.0	2.7	3.0	1.1		0.7	3.6	2.7	10.5
1–2 Dec	Tecnè	1,000	15.8	19.0	34.7	8.2	9.5	2.2	1.5	1.6		1.2	4.1	2.2	15.7
27 Nov–2 Dec	SWG	1,500	15.5	17.7	33.8	5.1	10.0	3.3	1.6	2.0	1.0	3.3	4.9	1.8	16.1
28–29 Nov	Tecnè	1,000	15.8	19.1	35.3	8.1	9.4	2.1	1.7	1.4			4.1	3.0	16.2
27–28 Nov	Termometro Politico	2,000	15.3	18.6	34.6	6.0	10.1	2.1	1.5	1.5	0.5	1.8	5.3	2.7	16.0
27 Nov	EMG	1,612	16.5	19.7	32.4	7.3	9.9	2.0	1.9	1.3	1.0	1.0	5.3	1.7	12.7
27 Nov	Index	800	16.9	19.3	32.8	6.6	9.3	2.6	1.7	2.0			5.0	3.8	13.5
26–27 Nov	Ipsos	1,000	16.6	18.1	31.9	6.2	10.6	2.0	1.2	2.3		2.3	5.3	3.5	13.8
25–26 Nov	Ixè	1,000	16.4	20.4	31.5	7.4	10.6	2.2	3.0	1.0			4.5	3.0	11.1
24–25 Nov	Tecnè	1,000	15.9	19.6	34.7	8.1	9.0	2.1	1.6	1.5		1.1	4.4	2.0	15.1
20–25 Nov	SWG	1,500	16.5	18.1	33.1	6.0	10.1	3.1	1.6	2.0	1.3		5.5	2.7	15.0
21–22 Nov	Piepoli	505	17.5	19.5	31.5	7.5	9.0	2.0	2.0	1.5		1.0	5.0	3.5	12.0
21–22 Nov	Tecnè	1,000	16.1	19.4	34.5	8.0	9.2	2.1	1.6	1.5			4.3	3.3	15.1
21 Nov	Noto	–	19.0	18.0	33.5	6.0	9.0	1.0	1.0	1.0	1.7	1.0	5.5	3.3	14.5
20–21 Nov	Termometro Politico	2,400	15.7	18.1	35.6	5.9	9.6	2.1	1.4	1.5	0.6	1.4	5.5	2.6	17.5
20 Nov	EMG	1,524	16.1	20.0	32.6	7.7	9.5	2.0	2.1	1.3		1.0	5.2	2.5	12.6
18–20 Nov	BiDiMedia	1,598	17.4	18.6	32.3	5.6	8.9	2.1	1.6	1.7	1.0	1.1	5.3	4.4	13.7
18–19 Nov	Ixè	1,000	16.3	21.2	31.9	7.5	9.9	1.7	3.1	1.1	0.7		4.6	2.0	10.7
13–18 Nov	SWG	1,500	16.2	18.3	34.0	6.4	9.5	3.3	1.7	2.3	1.1		5.0	2.2	15.7
14–15 Nov	Tecnè	1,000	16.3	19.3	34.2	8.0	9.3	1.9	1.7	1.3			4.6	3.4	14.9
13 Nov	Index	800	16.8	19.5	34.0	6.4	9.0	2.3	1.8	1.9			4.8	3.5	14.5
12–13 Nov	Termometro Politico	2,200	16.1	18.3	35.2	5.6	9.9	2.0	1.2	1.4	0.5	1.4	5.9	2.5	16.9
8–13 Nov	EMG	1,425	16.1	19.5	33.0	7.4	9.8	1.7	1.8	1.0		1.0	5.7	3.0	13.5
11–12 Nov	Ixè	1,000	16.3	21.0	32.6	7.3	9.6	1.8	2.7	1.3	0.8		4.3	2.3	11.6
10–12 Nov	Demopolis	1,500	17.2	18.5	34.0	5.6	9.4	2.5					5.8	7.0	15.5
11 Nov	Euromedia	800	15.8	18.1	33.0	6.8	9.3	1.9	1.1	1.5	0.3	1.9	5.8	4.5	14.9
10–11 Nov	Tecnè	1,000	16.9	18.7	34.5	8.1	9.2	1.8	1.8	1.3		1.2	4.5	2.0	15.8
6–11 Nov	SWG	1,500	15.8	18.6	34.5	6.2	9.5	3.0	1.5	1.9	1.3		5.6	2.1	15.9
8–9 Nov	Piepoli	505	17.5	19.0	31.5	7.0	9.0	2.0	2.5	2.0			4.5	5.0	12.5
7–8 Nov	Tecnè	1,000	16.8	18.8	34.5	8.1	9.1	1.7	1.8	1.4			4.5	3.3	15.7
6–7 Nov	Termometro Politico	2,300	15.8	18.5	35.9	5.5	9.3	2.0	1.3	1.5	0.6	1.3	5.9	2.4	17.4
6 Nov	Index	800	17.4	19.3	33.7	6.4	8.6	2.2	1.8	2.0			5.0	3.6	14.4
6 Nov	EMG	1,387	16.3	19.0	34.2	7.2	10.0	1.6	1.8	1.2		1.0	4.9	2.8	15.2
4–5 Nov	IZI	1,002	17.9	18.2	28.6	9.5	10.7		2.7				4.9	7.5	10.4
4–5 Nov	Ixè	1,000	17.9	20.1	32.0	7.8	9.5	1.9	2.2	1.5	0.9		3.9	2.3	11.9
30 Oct–4 Nov	SWG	1,500	16.8	17.5	34.1	6.2	8.9	3.3	1.8	2.2	1.1		6.0	2.1	16.6
31 Oct–1 Nov	Piepoli	506	18.5	19.5	31.0	7.0	8.5	2.0	2.0	2.0			4.0	5.5	11.5
30–31 Oct	Demopolis	1,500	18.0	19.0	33.0	6.0	9.0	2.5					5.8	6.7	14.0
29–31 Oct	Ipsos	1,000	17.9	17.2	34.3	6.2	9.8	1.7	1.0	2.2			6.2	3.5	16.4
30 Oct	Tecnè	1,000	17.5	19.3	34.4	8.2	8.5	1.7	1.8	1.6		1.0	4.2	1.8	15.1
30 Oct	Index	800	17.8	19.2	33.5	6.3	8.6	2.2	1.8	2.0			5.1	3.5	14.3
30 Oct	EMG	1,489	16.8	19.3	33.0	7.4	9.4	1.8	2.2	1.4		1.0	4.7	3.0	13.7
28–29 Oct	Ixè	1,000	19.2	19.5	30.9	7.7	9.5	2.0	2.0	1.6	1.0		3.7	2.9	11.4
27 Oct	Tecnè	1,000	17.7	19.2	34.4	8.1	8.6	1.6	1.9	1.5		1.0	4.1	1.9	15.2
23–27 Oct	SWG	1,500	18.2	18.0	33.6	5.5	9.0	3.2	1.6	2.1	1.6		5.2	2.0	13.9
24–25 Oct	Tecnè	1,000	18.0	19.3	33.2	8.2	8.4	1.9	1.9	1.6			4.3	3.2	13.9
23–24 Oct	Termometro Politico	2,300	17.1	18.9	35.2	5.6	8.2	1.9	1.2	1.5	0.5	1.3	5.6	3.0	16.3
22–24 Oct	Scenari Politici – Winpoll	1,500	14.7	20.6	34.0	6.2	7.7	2.0	1.3	1.6			6.6	5.2	13.4
23 Oct	Index	800	18.8	19.5	33.2	6.2	8.2	2.1	1.8	1.9			5.3	3.0	13.7
23 Oct	EMG	1,578	17.5	19.4	33.6	7.0	8.2	2.1	2.2	1.0		1.0	4.3	3.7	14.2
22 Oct	Noto	–	18.5	18.6	32.5	6.9	8.0	1.2	1.1	1.4	1.7	0.7	6.0	3.4	13.9
21–22 Oct	Ixè	1,000	20.8	19.8	30.5	8.1	8.7	1.8	2.1	1.9	1.0		3.5	1.8	9.7
20–21 Oct	Tecnè	1,000	18.5	19.4	33.0	8.0	8.2	1.7	1.8	1.6		1.1	4.8	1.9	13.6
16–21 Oct	SWG	1,500	17.8	18.8	34.0	5.5	8.4	2.8	1.8	1.9	1.3		5.6	2.1	15.2
17–18 Oct	Tecnè	1,000	19.8	20.2	31.6	7.8	7.8	1.8	2.0	1.7			4.1	3.2	11.4
17 Oct	Index	–	19.0	19.8	32.7	6.0	7.5	2.0	2.0	2.0			5.2	3.8	12.9
16–17 Oct	Euromedia	800	18.3	18.5	31.8	7.0	8.0	2.1	2.0	1.4	0.2	1.4	5.5	3.8	13.3
16–17 Oct	EMG	1,534	19.2	19.7	31.8	7.1	7.8	1.6	2.4	1.2		1.2	4.1	3.9	12.1
16–17 Oct	Termometro Politico	2,400	17.7	19.2	34.8	5.5	7.8	2.0	1.3	2.0	0.6	1.4	5.2	2.5	15.6
14–15 Oct	Ixè	1,000	19.7	20.4	30.7	7.8	8.2	2.0	2.5	1.4	1.1		4.0	2.2	10.3
13–14 Oct	Tecnè	1,000	19.8	20.4	31.5	7.8	7.7	1.6	1.8	2.0		1.3	4.3	1.8	11.1
9–14 Oct	SWG	1,500	18.6	19.4	33.2	5.1	7.6	3.1	1.9	1.9	1.6		5.3	2.3	13.8
10–11 Oct	Tecnè	1,000	20.0	20.7	31.2	7.7	7.6	1.7	1.9	1.9			4.0	3.3	10.5
9–11 Oct	Demopolis	1,000	20.0	19.2	32.0	6.2	7.5	2.5					5.3	7.3	12.0
10 Oct	Noto	–	19.0	19.0	31.0	6.5	7.5	1.4	1.5	1.5	1.7	0.5	6.0	4.4	12.0
9–10 Oct	Termometro Politico	1,600	18.2	19.4	34.1	5.3	8.1	2.0	1.3	2.1	0.5	1.4	4.9	2.7	14.7
9 Oct	Index	800	18.8	20.1	32.3	6.0	7.4	2.0	2.1	2.0			4.7	4.6	12.2
9 Oct	EMG	1,624	18.7	19.2	32.7	7.0	7.8	1.7	2.0	1.6		1.3	4.5	3.5	13.5
7–9 Oct	BiDiMedia	1,438	19.2	19.5	30.6	5.5	8.0	1.8	1.5	2.0	1.3	1.0	5.0	4.6	11.1
7–8 Oct	Euromedia	800	19.3	17.8	32.0	7.1	7.7	2.0	1.6	1.4	0.4	1.5	5.5	3.7	12.7
7–8 Oct	Ixè	1,000	20.2	21.9	30.0	7.2	8.6	2.1	2.9	1.6			3.5	2.0	8.1
7 Oct	Ipsos	600	19.6	20.1	31.2	6.9	8.5	2.5	1.2				4.2	5.8	11.1
6–7 Oct	Tecnè	1,000	20.1	20.3	30.8	7.9	8.0	1.5	1.9	2.1	0.6	1.3	4.2	1.3	10.5
2–7 Oct	SWG	1,500	18.5	20.0	32.3	5.0	7.1	3.3	1.8	2.3	1.6		5.6	2.5	12.3
3–5 Oct	Piepoli	–	19.5	20.5	30.0	6.5	7.0	2.0	2.5	2.0			3.5	6.5	9.5
3–4 Oct	Tecnè	1,000	19.8	19.7	31.4	8.0	7.8	1.6	1.8	2.0			4.5	3.4	11.6
3 Oct	Index	–	19.4	20.3	32.5	6.0	7.3	2.0	2.3	2.0			4.5	3.7	12.2
1–3 Oct	Demos & Pi	1,265	20.6	19.1	30.2	6.1	8.6	2.4	2.1	2.2			3.9	4.8	9.6
2 Oct	EMG	1,754	19.0	19.7	32.6	7.4	7.6	1.8	2.2	1.5		1.0	4.5	2.7	12.9
30 Sep–1 Oct	Ixè	1,000	21.0	21.6	29.7	6.9	8.6	2.3	2.3	1.5			3.9	2.2	8.3
29–30 Sep	Tecnè	1,000	20.2	19.7	31.4	7.9	7.7	1.7	1.8	1.9	0.7	1.1	4.6	1.3	11.2
25–30 Sep	SWG	1,500	19.6	19.4	32.8	5.0	7.3	3.6	1.6	2.0	1.7		4.9	2.1	13.2
26–27 Sep	Tecnè	800	20.0	19.8	31.9	7.8	7.5	1.8	2.0	1.7			4.3	3.2	11.9
23–27 Sep	GPF	811	24.2	20.1	29.1	6.0	7.0	1.2	2.5		0.9	1.8	4.4	2.8	4.9
25–26 Sep	Termometro Politico	2,400	17.4	18.6	35.3	5.4	8.2	1.6	1.3	2.0	0.5	1.2	5.5	3.0	16.7
25–26 Sep	Ipsos	1,000	20.8	19.5	30.8	7.0	8.9	2.8	1.6				4.8	3.8	10.0
25 Sep	EMG	1,785	18.7	20.3	32.2	6.8	7.3	2.1	2.6	1.6		1.1	4.3	3.0	11.9
25 Sep	Noto	–	19.5	20.0	33.0	6.0	7.0	2.0	1.5	1.5	1.5	1.0	4.5	2.5	13.0
23–24 Sep	Ixè	1,000	21.5	21.8	29.9	6.5	8.6	2.7	2.7	2.0			2.9	1.4	8.1
22–23 Sep	Tecnè	1,000	20.4	19.5	32.0	7.9	7.5	1.8	2.0	1.6	0.7	1.0	4.3	1.3	11.6
18–23 Sep	SWG	1,500	20.0	19.4	33.6	5.1	6.7	2.3	1.7	2.0	2.0		5.4	1.8	13.6
20–22 Sep	Piepoli	505	19.0	20.0	30.5	7.0	6.5	2.0	3.0	2.0			4.0	6.0	10.5
19–20 Sep	Tecnè	800	20.5	19.4	32.9	8.0	7.3	2.1	2.2	1.3			3.6	2.7	12.4
19–20 Sep	IZI	1,004	22.5	19.5	29.0	7.0	8.0						5.5	8.5	6.5
19–20 Sep	Quorum – YouTrend	1,007	18.0	21.2	31.3	6.9	7.8	3.1	2.7		0.8		3.6	4.6	10.1
18–20 Sep	ScenariPolitici – Winpoll	1,500	15.1	20.7	33.5	5.7	8.5	2.8	1.2	1.4			6.4	4.7	12.8
19 Sep	Index	–	19.8	20.5	33.0	6.0	7.0	2.0	2.5	1.8			3.5	3.9	12.5
18–19 Sep	Tecnè	1,000	20.5	19.4	33.0	7.9	7.2	2.0	2.3	1.3	0.7	0.7	3.6	1.4	12.5
18–19 Sep	Demopolis	1,500	20.5	19.4	33.0	6.0	7.0						5.2	8.9	12.5
18–19 Sep	Termometro Politico	2,000	18.5	19.5	36.1	5.2	8.4	1.6	1.2	1.0	0.7	1.5	3.6	2.7	16.6
17–18 Sep	Euromedia	800	19.2	17.6	32.1	6.5	7.0	2.4	1.8	1.1	1.2	1.6	5.0	4.5	12.9
14–18 Sep	BiDiMedia	1,548	20.0	22.4	30.3	6.0	7.3	2.0	2.3	1.8	1.4			6.5	7.9
17 Sep	EMG	1,805	18.5	20.2	33.1	7.0	7.3	2.0	2.7	1.5	1.2	1.1	3.4	2.0	12.9
16–17 Sep	Ixè	1,000	21.9	21.6	29.9	7.4	8.3	3.2	4.0	1.6			Did not exist	2.1	8.0
15–16 Sep	Tecnè	1,000	20.7	23.3	32.3	7.9	7.3	2.0	2.6	1.3			Did not exist	2.6	9.0
11–16 Sep	SWG	1,500	20.5	21.5	34.0	5.9	7.0	2.2	2.4	2.3	2.0		Did not exist	2.2	12.5
12 Sep	Tecnè	800	21.1	23.6	31.3	8.1	7.3	2.1	2.6	1.3			Did not exist	2.6	7.7
11–12 Sep	Termometro Politico	3,000	19.8	23.0	34.9	5.1	7.9	1.7	1.2	1.7	0.6	1.8	Did not exist	2.3	11.9
10–12 Sep	Demos & Pi	1,006	20.8	22.3	32.5	6.5	7.4	3.1	2.5				Did not exist	4.9	10.2
9–12 Sep	Scenari Politici – Winpoll	1,500	15.5	23.3	34.0	6.8	8.9	3.1	2.4	2.0			Did not exist	4.0	10.7
10 Sep	EMG	1,865	19.7	23.0	33.3	7.8	7.0	1.8	2.6	1.2	1.0		Did not exist	2.6	10.3
9–10 Sep	Euromedia	800	19.7	20.6	33.9	6.6	6.4	2.9	2.7	0.9	1.4	1.4	Did not exist	3.5	13.3
9–10 Sep	Noto	–	19.0	22.5	34.0	5.5	7.0	2.0	2.0	1.5	1.5	2.5	Did not exist	2.5	11.5
9–10 Sep	Demopolis	1,500	21.8	23.2	32.5	6.5	7.0	3.0				Did not exist	Did not exist	6.0	9.3
9–10 Sep	Ixè	1,000	22.0	22.6	30.0	7.4	7.9	2.5	4.2	1.4		Did not exist	Did not exist	2.0	7.4
8–9 Sep	Tecnè	1,000	22.2	24.2	30.5	7.8	7.1	1.7	2.6	1.5		Did not exist	Did not exist	2.4	6.3
4–9 Sep	SWG	1,500	21.0	22.1	33.4	5.2	7.2	2.3	2.6	2.2	2.3	Did not exist	Did not exist	1.7	11.3
7 Sep	Piepoli	–	20.5	24.0	30.0	7.0	6.5		3.5			Did not exist	Did not exist	8.5	6.0
5 Sep	Tecnè	1,000	21.7	24.4	30.7	7.9	7.0	1.7	2.7	1.6		Did not exist	Did not exist	2.3	6.3
4–5 Sep	Demopolis	1,500	22.0	23.0	32.0	6.7	6.8	3.0				Did not exist	Did not exist	6.5	9.0
4–5 Sep	GPF	1,002	24.3	23.9	30.3	6.1	6.6	1.3	2.8		1.2	Did not exist	Did not exist	3.5	6.0
4 Sep	Noto	–	20.0	23.0	35.0	6.5	7.0	2.0	2.0	1.5		Did not exist	Did not exist	3.0	12.0
2–3 Sep	Ixè	1,000	22.3	23.0	30.1	7.0	7.4	2.4	4.0	1.5		Did not exist	Did not exist	2.3	7.1
31 Aug–2 Sep	Tecnè	1,000	21.5	24.6	31.0	7.8	7.0	1.5	2.5	1.6		Did not exist	Did not exist	2.5	6.4
29 Aug–2 Sep	SWG	1,500	21.4	21.1	33.6	6.2	6.9	2.7	3.0	2.4		Did not exist	Did not exist	2.7	12.2
29–30 Aug	Quorum – YouTrend	1,000	18.6	22.3	31.9	6.8	8.8	2.9	4.1			Did not exist	Did not exist	4.6	9.6
26–28 Aug	Ipsos	998	24.2	22.3	31.8	6.0	7.8	2.5	2.2	1.0		Did not exist	Did not exist	2.2	7.6
24–28 Aug	BiDiMedia	1,693	19.2	24.2	32.5	6.2	7.7	2.1	2.7	1.9		Did not exist	Did not exist	3.5	8.3
27 Aug	Piepoli	505	16.5	23.5	32.0	7.5	6.0		3.5			Did not exist	Did not exist	11.0	8.5
23–25 Aug	Demopolis	3,002	19.0	23.0	33.0	6.2	6.8					Did not exist	Did not exist	12.0	10.0
21–23 Aug	Scenari Politici – Winpoll	1,500	16.6	24.0	33.7	6.6	8.3	2.3	3.2	1.4		Did not exist	Did not exist	3.9	9.7
21–23 Aug	Termometro Politico	3,000	17.8	24.1	36.6	5.8	7.0	1.8	2.1	1.3		Did not exist	Did not exist	3.5	12.5
21 Aug	Tecnè	1,000	20.8	24.6	31.3	8.3	6.7	1.4	2.5	1.8		Did not exist	Did not exist	2.6	6.7
20–21 Aug	GPF	609	23.1	23.5	31.2	5.9	6.7	1.0	2.9		2.1	Did not exist	Did not exist	3.6	7.7
19–21 Aug	IZI	1,008	16.0	23.5	36.0	6.4	8.1		2.0		Did not exist	Did not exist	Did not exist	8.0	12.5
12 Aug	GPF	802	23.7	22.8	32.1	6.1	6.6	0.8	2.8		Did not exist	Did not exist	Did not exist	5.1	8.4
7–10 Aug	Termometro Politico	2,500	18.2	23.4	36.1	6.0	7.1	1.8	2.3	1.8	Did not exist	Did not exist	Did not exist	3.3	12.7
9 Aug	Noto	–	16.5	23.0	38.0	6.5	8.0	1.5			Did not exist	Did not exist	Did not exist	6.5	15.0
5 Aug	Tecnè	1,000	17.5	22.4	38.0	8.0	6.0	1.4	2.4	2.2	Did not exist	Did not exist	Did not exist	2.1	15.6
29 Jul–2 Aug	Termometro Politico	1,700	17.0	22.6	37.5	6.2	6.9	2.0	2.2	1.9	Did not exist	Did not exist	Did not exist	3.7	14.9
30 Jul–1 Aug	Tecnè	1,000	17.6	22.5	37.7	8.1	6.0	1.6	2.4	2.3	Did not exist	Did not exist	Did not exist	1.8	15.2
30–31 Jul	Ipsos	1,000	17.8	20.5	36.0	7.1	7.5	2.0	3.5	1.9	Did not exist	Did not exist	Did not exist	3.7	15.5
27–30 Jul	Scenari Politici – Winpoll	1,500	14.8	23.3	38.9	6.7	7.4	1.9	2.3	1.7	Did not exist	Did not exist	Did not exist	3.0	15.6
24–29 Jul	SWG	1,500	17.3	22.0	38.0	6.5	6.6	2.1	2.7	2.3	Did not exist	Did not exist	Did not exist	2.5	16.0
24–25 Jul	Tecnè	1,000	17.5	22.7	38.1	7.8	6.3	1.4	2.5	2.1	Did not exist	Did not exist	Did not exist	1.6	15.4
22–24 Jul	Demopolis	1,500	18.0	22.5	36.0	6.7	6.8				Did not exist	Did not exist	Did not exist	10.0	13.5
22 Jul	Euromedia	1,000	18.0	20.0	36.0	8.1	6.1	2.3	3.3		Did not exist	Did not exist	Did not exist	6.2	16.0
22 Jul	Piepoli	505	17.5	22.5	36.0	7.0	5.5		3.0		Did not exist	Did not exist	Did not exist	8.5	13.5
17–22 Jul	SWG	1,500	18.5	21.5	37.8	6.6	6.3	2.0	2.8	2.5	Did not exist	Did not exist	Did not exist	2.0	16.3
17–18 Jul	Tecnè	1,000	17.3	23.6	37.0	8.0	6.6	1.5	2.4	1.9	Did not exist	Did not exist	Did not exist	1.7	13.4
16–18 Jul	Ipsos	1,000	17.4	21.6	35.9	8.2	6.0	1.8	3.5	2.0	Did not exist	Did not exist	Did not exist	3.6	14.3
16–18 Jul	Termometro Politico	1,400	17.1	23.1	37.9	6.2	6.8	1.8	2.1	1.8	Did not exist	Did not exist	Did not exist	3.2	14.8
15–18 Jul	GPF	919	24.2	22.8	33.1	7.0	6.1	0.4	2.5		Did not exist	Did not exist	Did not exist	3.9	8.9
15 Jul	Piepoli	500	17.5	23.5	36.0	8.0	5.5				Did not exist	Did not exist	Did not exist	9.5	12.5
10–15 Jul	SWG	1,500	17.9	22.0	37.7	7.0	6.4	1.8	3.0	2.4	Did not exist	Did not exist	Did not exist	1.8	15.7
9–12 Jul	Termometro Politico	1,300	17.1	22.6	37.9	6.3	7.0	1.7	2.3	1.8	Did not exist	Did not exist	Did not exist	3.3	15.3
10–11 Jul	Tecnè	1,000	17.2	23.5	37.1	7.9	6.8	1.4	2.3	2.0	Did not exist	Did not exist	Did not exist	1.8	13.6
8–10 Jul	Demos & Pi	1,017	17.6	22.5	35.3	7.0	6.2	2.0	3.5	2.1	Did not exist	Did not exist	Did not exist	3.8	12.8
8–10 Jul	GPF	807	23.7	22.3	33.7	7.1	5.9	0.4	2.7		Did not exist	Did not exist	Did not exist	4.2	10.0
7–8 Jul	Tecnè	1,000	16.9	23.4	37.8	7.7	6.9				Did not exist	Did not exist	Did not exist	7.3	14.4
3–8 Jul	SWG	1,500	17.4	22.7	37.5	6.8	6.6	1.7	2.9	2.4	Did not exist	Did not exist	Did not exist	2.0	14.8
7 Jul	Noto	–	17.0	24.0	38.0	6.5	8.0	1.5	1.5	1.5	Did not exist	Did not exist	Did not exist	2.0	14.0
4 Jul	Eumetra	–	19.0	24.0	37.5	8.0	6.5				Did not exist	Did not exist	Did not exist	5.0	13.5
1–4 Jul	Termometro Politico	1,700	18.0	22.9	37.0	6.7	7.0	1.4	1.8	1.7	Did not exist	Did not exist	Did not exist	3.5	14.1
29 Jun–4 Jul	BiDiMedia	1,698	18.1	23.5	35.0	6.3	6.8	1.9	2.7	2.5	Did not exist	Did not exist	Did not exist	3.2	11.5
26 Jun–1 Jul	SWG	1,500	17.2	22.6	38.0	6.5	6.4	1.5	2.8	2.7	Did not exist	Did not exist	Did not exist	2.3	15.4
26 Jun	Noto	–	17.5	25.0	36.0	7.5	8.0	1.0	2.0	1.5	Did not exist	Did not exist	Did not exist	1.5	11.0
25–26 Jun	Ipsos	1,000	17.3	21.2	33.3	9.3	6.7	1.9	3.4	2.5	Did not exist	Did not exist	Did not exist	4.4	12.1
25 Jun	EMG	1,845	19.0	23.8	34.6	8.5	6.7	2.0	2.9	0.9	Did not exist	Did not exist	Did not exist	1.6	10.8
23–24 Jun	Tecnè	1,000	17.0	23.4	35.5	9.1	6.6				Did not exist	Did not exist	Did not exist	8.4	12.1
19–24 Jun	SWG	1,500	18.0	22.6	37.3	6.6	6.5	1.6	2.8	2.7	Did not exist	Did not exist	Did not exist	1.9	14.7
19–20 Jun	Demopolis	1,500	18.5	22.0	35.2	7.0	6.8				Did not exist	Did not exist	Did not exist	10.5	13.2
18 Jun	EMG	1,815	17.9	24.4	35.0	8.0	7.0	2.0	2.7	1.1	Did not exist	Did not exist	Did not exist	1.9	10.6
18 Jun	Noto	–	17.5	24.0	35.0	7.5	7.5	1.5	2.5	1.5	Did not exist	Did not exist	Did not exist	3.0	11.0
12–17 Jun	SWG	1,500	18.3	22.5	37.0	6.6	6.7	1.7	2.7	2.6	Did not exist	Did not exist	Did not exist	1.9	14.5
12 Jun	Index	800	19.2	22.6	34.5	6.7	6.8	1.7	3.0	2.7	Did not exist	Did not exist	Did not exist	2.8	11.9
11 Jun	EMG	1,735	18.0	23.9	35.2	8.6	6.7	1.9	2.5	1.1	Did not exist	Did not exist	Did not exist	2.1	11.3
11 Jun	Noto	–	18.0	24.0	35.0	8.0	7.5	1.5	2.5	2.0	Did not exist	Did not exist	Did not exist	1.5	11.0
10 Jun	Euromedia	800	18.0	23.5	35.1	7.0	6.3	2.0	3.5	1.3	Did not exist	Did not exist	Did not exist	3.3	11.6
10 Jun	Piepoli	505	17.0	23.5	35.0	8.0	6.0	1.5	3.0	1.5	Did not exist	Did not exist	Did not exist	4.5	11.5
9–10 Jun	Tecnè	1,000	16.9	23.6	36.0	8.7	6.7				Did not exist	Did not exist	Did not exist	8.1	12.4
5–10 Jun	SWG	1,500	18.4	22.8	37.3	6.3	6.3	1.5	2.8	2.8	Did not exist	Did not exist	Did not exist	1.8	14.5
3–7 Jun	Termometro Politico	1,700	18.0	23.1	35.3	6.2	7.2	1.2	2.6	2.7	Did not exist	Did not exist	Did not exist	3.7	12.2
5–6 Jun	Tecnè	1,000	16.9	23.7	36.1	9.0	6.6				Did not exist	Did not exist	Did not exist	7.7	12.4
5 Jun	Index	800	18.9	23.3	34.0	6.9	7.0	1.8	3.0	2.5	Did not exist	Did not exist	Did not exist	2.6	10.7
2–3 Jun	Tecnè	1,000	16.8	23.9	35.8	9.2	6.8				Did not exist	Did not exist	Did not exist	7.5	11.9
29 May–3 Jun	SWG	1,500	17.5	23.5	36.5	6.9	6.6	1.7	2.7	2.6	Did not exist	Did not exist	Did not exist	2.0	13.0
1 Jun	EMG	1,600	19.0	24.0	34.0	8.0	6.0	2.5	3.0		Did not exist	Did not exist	Did not exist	3.5	10.0
30 May	Piepoli	1,000	17.0	23.0	35.0	9.0	6.0	2.0	3.0	2.0	Did not exist	Did not exist	Did not exist	3.0	12.0
28–29 May	Scenari Politici – Winpoll	1,500	16.5	23.8	36.3	7.9	6.8	1.4	2.7	1.8	Did not exist	Did not exist	Did not exist	2.8	12.5
26 May	EP election	–	17.1	22.7	34.3	8.8	6.5	1.7	3.1	2.3	Did not exist	Did not exist	Did not exist	3.5	11.5
8–9 May	Tecnè	1,000	22.5	21.5	31.0	10.5	5.0	3.0	3.5		Did not exist	Did not exist	Did not exist	3.0	8.5
8–9 May	Euromedia	800	21.5	21.9	29.6	10.1	5.3	2.0	3.5		Did not exist	Did not exist	Did not exist	6.1	7.7
8–9 May	Demopolis	2,000	23.0	22.2	31.0	8.4	5.5	2.8	3.2		Did not exist	Did not exist	Did not exist	3.9	8.0
7–9 May	Scenari Politici – Winpoll	1,500	22.7	22.1	33.8	7.8	5.8	2.1	2.4	1.3	Did not exist	Did not exist	Did not exist	2.0	11.1
6–9 May	Ixè	1,000	20.5	20.1	30.5	9.6	5.2	3.4	4.0		Did not exist	Did not exist	Did not exist	6.7	10.0
5–9 May	Termometro Politico	6,000	23.0	21.8	30.6	9.5	5.8	1.9	2.8	0.8	Did not exist	Did not exist	Did not exist	3.8	7.6
8 May	Piepoli	503	22.0	21.0	30.5	10.0	5.0	2.0	3.5		Did not exist	Did not exist	Did not exist	6.0	8.5
7–8 May	Index	800	22.3	21.1	32.4	9.2	5.0	2.7	3.0	1.7	Did not exist	Did not exist	Did not exist	2.6	10.1
6–8 May	SWG	1,500	22.7	22.5	30.5	9.4	4.7	2.7	2.6	1.7	Did not exist	Did not exist	Did not exist	3.2	7.8
6–8 May	BiDiMedia	1,455	22.4	21.2	32.2	9.0	4.7	2.5	3.0	1.7	Did not exist	Did not exist	Did not exist	3.3	9.8
6–8 May	Demos & Pi	1,007	22.6	20.4	32.2	9.5	4.7	3.1	4.1		Did not exist	Did not exist	Did not exist	3.4	9.6
6–8 May	Ipsos	1,000	24.9	20.5	30.9	7.8	5.7	2.1	3.2	1.8	Did not exist	Did not exist	Did not exist	3.1	6.0
7 May	EMG	1,642	23.5	21.2	32.2	10.3	5.0	2.6	2.8		Did not exist	Did not exist	Did not exist	2.4	8.7
7 May	Noto	–	21.0	21.0	32.0	9.0	5.5	2.0	3.5	1.0	Did not exist	Did not exist	Did not exist	5.0	11.0
5–7 May	Demopolis	1,500	24.5	19.0	29.0	9.0	4.8				Did not exist	Did not exist	Did not exist	13.7	4.5
4–6 May	Tecnè	1,509	22.0	21.0	31.0	10.5	5.0	3.5	3.5		Did not exist	Did not exist	Did not exist	3.5	9.0
30 Apr–6 May	SWG	1,500	22.7	22.2	30.7	9.1	4.6	2.8	2.7	1.8	Did not exist	Did not exist	Did not exist	3.4	8.0
24 Apr–6 May	CISE	1,000	23.5	20.4	30.8	11.0	4.6	2.3	4.9		Did not exist	Did not exist	Did not exist	2.5	7.3
2–3 May	Quorum – YouTrend	1,000	22.2	21.4	32.1	9.5	5.3	3.2	2.3		Did not exist	Did not exist	Did not exist	4.0	9.9
30 Apr	Piepoli	504	22.0	20.5	31.0	10.0	5.5	2.0	3.5	1.0	Did not exist	Did not exist	Did not exist	4.5	9.0
30 Apr	Euromedia	800	20.6	20.3	32.4	10.3	5.3	1.5	3.8	1.4	Did not exist	Did not exist	Did not exist	4.4	11.8
30 Apr	Index	800	22.0	20.5	32.8	9.3	5.0	4.4	3.1		Did not exist	Did not exist	Did not exist	2.9	10.8
30 Apr	Noto	–	20.0	22.0	32.0	8.5	6.0	2.5	3.0	1.5	Did not exist	Did not exist	Did not exist	4.5	10.0
28–29 Apr	Tecnè	1,000	22.3	21.4	31.2	12.2	5.2				Did not exist	Did not exist	Did not exist	7.7	8.9
24–29 Apr	SWG	1,500	21.8	22.5	31.6	8.8	5.0	3.1	2.9	1.5	Did not exist	Did not exist	Did not exist	2.8	9.1
27 Apr	EMG	1,536	22.9	21.9	32.2	10.1	5.1	2.5	3.0		Did not exist	Did not exist	Did not exist	2.3	9.3
23 Apr	EMG	1,525	23.1	22.6	31.3	10.2	5.4	2.8	3.0		Did not exist	Did not exist	Did not exist	1.6	8.2
23 Apr	Noto	–	20.5	21.0	33.5	8.5	6.0	2.0	3.0	1.0	Did not exist	Did not exist	Did not exist	4.5	12.5
22–23 Apr	Demopolis	1,500	23.5	20.0	31.0	9.3	4.2				Did not exist	Did not exist	Did not exist	12.0	7.5
18–23 Apr	Scenari Politici – Winpoll	1,500	20.1	20.5	36.4	8.7	5.4	1.9	3.1	1.7	Did not exist	Did not exist	Did not exist	2.2	15.9
17–23 Apr	SWG	1,500	22.3	22.0	32.3	8.4	4.8	3.4	3.0	1.6	Did not exist	Did not exist	Did not exist	2.2	10.0
19–22 Apr	Termometro Politico	1,000	23.5	22.0	31.5	9.1	5.7	2.1	2.9	1.0	Did not exist	Did not exist	Did not exist	2.2	8.0
20 Apr	Ipsos	–	22.3	18.7	36.9	8.7	4.6	2.1	3.0	1.3	Did not exist	Did not exist	Did not exist	2.4	14.6
18 Apr	Tecnè	1,000	22.0	20.6	32.0	11.6	4.9				Did not exist	Did not exist	Did not exist	8.9	10.0
17 Apr	Index	800	21.7	19.8	32.9	9.2	4.8	4.4	3.1		Did not exist	Did not exist	Did not exist	4.1	11.2
16 Apr	EMG	1,794	22.6	21.8	32.1	9.5	4.9	2.9	2.9		Did not exist	Did not exist	Did not exist	3.3	9.5
16 Apr	Piepoli	503	22.5	20.5	31.0	10.5	5.5	3.5	3.0	1.5	Did not exist	Did not exist	Did not exist	2.0	8.5
16 Apr	Euromedia	800	20.8	19.5	33.0	10.6	5.5	3.0	3.8	1.2	Did not exist	Did not exist	Did not exist	2.6	12.2
16 Apr	Noto	–	20.0	21.0	33.5	9.0	6.0	3.0	3.5	1.5	Did not exist	Did not exist	Did not exist	2.5	12.5
10–15 Apr	SWG	1,500	22.5	21.5	32.3	8.9	4.8	2.9	3.3	1.2	Did not exist	Did not exist	Did not exist	2.6	9.8
11–12 Apr	Quorum	1,000	22.3	21.1	33.2	9.9	5.1	2.7	2.0		Did not exist	Did not exist	Did not exist	3.7	10.9
8–11 Apr	BiDiMedia	1,310	21.5	21.5	32.3	10.1	4.8	2.8	3.3	1.6	Did not exist	Did not exist	Did not exist	2.1	10.8
2–10 Apr	Termometro Politico	1,500	22.6	21.7	32.0	9.8	5.6	2.3	3.0	1.4	Did not exist	Did not exist	Did not exist	1.6	9.4

Fieldwork date	Polling firm	Sample size	M5S	PD	Lega	FI	FdI	LeU	+E	NcI	PaP (Note: In the 2018 Italian general election, Power to the People (PaP) was a joint list including the Communist Refoundation Party (PRC) and the Italian Communist Party (PCI), which left the alliance a few months later. Some polls included these two parties within PaP and/or Popular Coalition (CP).)	Others	Lead
9 Apr	EMG	1,845	21.5	22.3	31.4	10.1	4.8		2.9	0.5		6.5	9.1
9 Apr	Noto	–	20.0	21.0	32.5	9.5	5.5	1.5	3.0	0.5	1.0	5.5	11.5
7–8 Apr	Tecnè	1,000	21.4	20.0	31.9	12.3	4.7					9.7	10.5
5–8 Apr	Scenari Politici – Winpoll	1,500	20.5	20.9	35.7	9.5	4.3	1.7	2.8		1.4	3.2	15.8
3–8 Apr	SWG	1,500	22.0	22.1	31.8	8.9	4.9	2.9	3.1		1.1	3.2	9.7
2–4 Apr	Ipsos	1,000	23.3	19.0	35.7	9.9	4.0	2.0	3.1			3.0	12.5
3 Apr	Piepoli	504	22.5	20.0	30.5	10.5	5.0	3.0	3.0	0.5		5.0	8.0
3 Apr	Euromedia	800	19.4	20.1	31.4	11.1	5.4	3.9	3.8	w. FI		4.9	11.3
2–3 Apr	Index	800	21.1	20.8	33.6	9.3	4.6	3.2	2.8		1.5	3.1	12.5
2 Apr	EMG	1,725	22.7	21.1	31.9	9.3	4.7		2.9	0.6	1.6	5.2	9.2
2 Apr	Noto	–	20.5	21.0	32.0	10.5	5.0	1.5	3.5	0.5	1.0	4.5	11.0
31 Mar–1 Apr	Tecnè	1,000	21.0	20.1	31.9	12.1	4.6					10.3	10.9
29 Mar–1 Apr	Ixè	1,000	19.1	22.6	31.2	8.7	4.9	3.2	2.5	0.6	1.3	5.9	8.6
27 Mar–1 Apr	SWG	1,500	22.2	20.8	32.9	9.0	4.6	1.0	2.9		1.3	5.3	10.7
25 Mar–1 Apr	Termometro Politico	4,000	21.3	21.6	31.9	9.1	4.6	3.6	3.2		1.1	3.6	10.3
29–30 Mar	Quorum – YouTrend	1,000	22.7	20.5	32.1	10.0	5.3	3.4	2.7			3.3	9.4
28 Mar	Tecnè	1,002	21.0	20.2	32.0	11.8	4.7					10.3	11.0
26–27 Mar	Index	800	20.6	21.1	34.5	9.1	4.5	2.9	2.7		1.7	2.9	13.4
26–27 Mar	Demopolis	1,500	22.0	21.0	32.0	9.0	4.0					12.0	10.0
26 Mar	EMG	1,865	22.9	21.1	31.8	9.5	4.9		3.0	0.6	1.6	4.6	8.9
26 Mar	Noto	–	21.0	21.0	32.0	11.0	4.5	2.0	3.5	0.5	1.0	3.5	11.0
22–25 Mar	Scenari Politici – Winpoll	1,500	20.3	21.2	35.8	9.2	4.1	1.5	3.1		1.6	3.2	14.6
20–25 Mar	SWG	1,500	21.3	21.0	33.4	8.7	4.7	2.3	2.9		2.2	3.5	12.1
21 Mar	Piepoli	–	23.0	20.0	31.0	11.5	4.5	2.0	3.0	0.5		4.5	8.0
20–21 Mar	Euromedia	800	19.8	20.7	33.1	11.4	4.7	2.2	3.6			4.5	12.4
20–21 Mar	Tecnè	1,000	19.9	21.0	33.1	11.7	4.5					9.8	12.1
20 Mar	Index	800	20.4	21.2	34.8	9.0	4.4	2.8	2.7		1.7	3.0	13.6
19 Mar	EMG	1,785	23.4	21.0	30.9	10.0	4.8		3.0	0.6	1.6	4.7	7.5
19 Mar	Noto	–	21.0	21.0	32.5	11.0	4.5	1.5	3.5	0.5	1.0	3.5	11.5
13–18 Mar	SWG	1,500	21.0	21.1	33.9	8.6	4.4	2.4	3.0		2.0	3.6	12.8
17–18 Mar	Tecnè	1,000	21.8	20.4	31.2	11.9	4.4					10.3	9.4
12–13 Mar	Index	800	21.3	20.1	34.6	9.1	4.3	2.9	2.7		1.7	3.3	13.3
12–13 Mar	Demopolis	1,500	22.8	20.2	33.0	8.8	3.6					11.6	10.2
11–13 Mar	Demos & Pi	1,005	23.2	19.0	34.4	9.6	4.2	2.6	2.5			4.5	11.2
12 Mar	EMG	1,845	23.8	19.9	30.6	9.8	4.9		3.1	0.6	1.6	5.7	6.8
12 Mar	Noto	–	21.0	21.0	32.5	11.5	4.0	1.5	3.5	0.5	1.0	3.5	11.5
12 Mar	Piepoli	500	24.5	19.0	31.5	11.0	4.0	2.5	3.5	0.5		3.5	7.0
6–11 Mar	SWG	1,500	21.8	20.3	33.7	8.9	4.1	2.6	2.8		1.9	3.9	11.9
6–7 Mar	Tecnè	2,000	22.2	20.3	31.2	12.5	4.2		3.3			6.3	9.0
5–6 Mar	Index	800	21.7	18.9	34.6	9.0	4.5	3.3	2.8		1.8	3.4	12.9
5 Mar	EMG	1,803	23.2	19.3	31.2	10.2	4.8		3.1	0.6	1.4	6.2	8.0
5 Mar	Noto	–	21.0	20.0	33.0	11.0	4.0	1.5	3.5	0.5	1.0	4.5	12.0
3–4 Mar	Tecnè	1,003	21.8	18.8	32.5	12.0	4.6					10.3	10.7
27 Feb–4 Mar	SWG	1,500	22.1	19.8	33.4	8.8	4.4	2.4	3.0		2.0	4.1	11.3
1–3 Mar	Scenari Politici – Winpoll	1,500	21.6	20.3	35.4	8.8	3.8	1.9	3.2		1.7	3.3	13.8
27–28 Feb	Tecnè	1,000	22.0	18.3	32.5	12.1	4.7					10.4	10.5
26–28 Feb	Ipsos	1,000	21.2	18.5	35.9	8.6	4.0	2.4	4.0	0.5		4.9	14.7
26–27 Feb	Index	800	22.1	18.0	34.5	9.1	4.5	3.5	3.0		2.0	3.3	12.4
22–27 Feb	BiDiMedia	1,084	22.7	18.9	32.3	9.5	4.0	2.5	2.6	0.6	1.7	5.2	9.6
26 Feb	EMG	1,603	23.8	18.2	31.2	10.7	5.0		3.0	0.6	1.6	5.9	7.4
25 Feb	Piepoli	505	25.0	18.5	31.5	11.0	4.5	1.5	3.5	0.5		4.0	6.5
25 Feb	Euromedia	800	21.8	18.6	34.6	11.0	4.7	1.9	3.7	w. FI		3.7	12.8
20–25 Feb	SWG	1,500	22.6	18.5	33.2	8.7	4.3	3.0	3.1		2.3	4.3	10.6
19–20 Feb	Index	800	22.2	17.5	34.7	8.7	4.5	3.6	2.8		2.2	3.8	12.5
19 Feb	EMG	1,802	24.8	17.9	30.7	10.3	5.2		3.0	0.7	1.6	5.8	5.9
19 Feb	Noto	–	21.0	18.0	35.0	11.0	4.0	2.0	3.5	0.5	1.0	4.0	14.0
17–18 Feb	Tecnè	1,000	23.2	16.9	33.0	12.0	4.4					10.5	9.8
13–18 Feb	SWG	1,500	22.1	18.6	33.4	9.0	4.5	2.9	2.9		2.2	4.4	11.3
14–17 Feb	Scenari Politici – Winpoll	1,500	23.2	18.7	36.2	9.0	3.4	1.8	2.8		1.6	3.3	13.0
13–15 Feb	Quorum – YouTrend	1,003	24.3	18.0	32.9	10.3	5.1					9.4	8.6
12–13 Feb	Index	800	22.3	17.3	34.5	8.3	4.6	3.5	2.9		2.3	4.3	12.2
12–13 Feb	Demopolis	1,500	25.2	17.5	33.0	8.6	3.4					12.3	7.8
12 Feb	EMG	–	24.6	18.0	31.4	9.5	4.9		3.0	0.7	2.0	5.9	6.8
12 Feb	Piepoli	500	27.0	17.5	30.5	10.0	5.0	3.5	2.5	0.5		3.5	3.5
12 Feb	Euromedia	800	24.0	16.8	34.4	10.5	4.6	3.4	3.3	0.3		2.7	10.4
12 Feb	Noto	–	22.0	19.0	34.0	10.0	4.5	2.0	3.5	0.5	1.5	3.0	12.0
6–11 Feb	SWG	1,500	23.3	17.5	33.8	8.5	4.6	2.7	3.1		2.4	4.1	10.5
6–7 Feb	Ipsos	1,000	25.4	16.1	34.4	8.1	3.6	2.2	4.2	0.8		5.2	9.0
4–7 Feb	Tecnè	16,000	25.1	16.7	31.9	11.7	4.5		3.1			7.0	6.8
6 Feb	Index	800	23.3	17.2	34.2	8.1	4.3	3.0	2.8		2.2	4.9	10.9
2–6 Feb	BiDiMedia	1,113	24.9	18.7	31.3	9.0	3.5	2.6	2.4	0.6	1.7	5.3	6.4
5 Feb	EMG	1,803	25.1	18.7	30.1	9.7	4.5		3.0	0.8	2.0	6.1	5.0
3–4 Feb	Tecnè	998	25.0	17.3	32.1	11.7	4.1					9.8	7.1
30 Jan–4 Feb	SWG	1,500	24.0	16.8	33.8	8.3	4.3	2.9	3.1		2.5	4.3	9.8
30 Jan	Noto	–	24.0	19.0	33.0	9.0	4.5	2.0	3.0	0.5	1.5	3.5	9.0
29–30 Jan	Index	800	23.5	17.5	33.7	7.9	4.3	2.9	2.7		2.0	5.5	10.2
28–30 Jan	Demos & Pi	1,006	24.9	18.2	33.7	9.4	3.3	2.8	3.0			4.7	8.8
29 Jan	EMG	1,786	25.8	18.2	30.3	9.2	4.5		3.0	0.8	1.9	6.3	4.5
29 Jan	Piepoli	503	27.5	17.0	30.0	10.5	4.5	3.0	2.5	0.5		4.5	2.5
29 Jan	Euromedia	800	24.7	17.2	33.0	10.4	4.6	3.4	2.8	0.5		3.4	8.3
27–28 Jan	Tecnè	1,000	25.8	17.9	30.2	11.9	4.3					9.9	4.4
23–28 Jan	SWG	1,500	24.9	17.2	32.6	8.1	4.5	2.6	2.9		2.4	4.8	7.7
22 Jan	Piepoli	503	28.0	17.0	30.0	10.5	4.5	2.5	2.0	0.5		5.0	2.0
22 Jan	EMG	1,801	26.5	17.9	30.1	8.9	4.7		2.6	0.7	2.1	6.5	3.6
16–21 Jan	SWG	1,500	25.7	17.9	31.5	8.6	4.4	2.8	3.0		2.3	3.8	5.8
16–17 Jan	Tecnè	1,005	25.5	17.6	31.2	12.0	3.9					9.8	5.7
15–17 Jan	Ipsos	1,000	25.4	17.3	35.8	7.1	3.4		3.5	0.6		6.9	10.4
15–16 Jan	Index	800	23.9	17.6	33.0	8.0	4.1	2.7	2.5		2.1	6.1	9.1
15 Jan	EMG	1,794	26.6	18.5	30.6	8.8	4.4		2.1	0.8	1.8	6.4	4.0
15 Jan	Piepoli	505	28.0	17.5	30.5	10.5	4.0	2.5	2.0	0.5		4.5	2.5
15 Jan	Euromedia	800	24.7	16.5	31.2	10.5	5.0	3.1	3.1	0.5		5.4	6.5
15 Jan	Noto	–	23.0	19.0	32.0	9.0	4.0	2.5	2.5	0.5	1.5	6.0	9.0
14–15 Jan	Demopolis	1,500	26.5	17.6	32.0	9.0	3.4					11.5	5.5
9–14 Jan	SWG	1,500	25.2	17.3	32.2	8.2	4.2	3.1	3.2		2.5	4.1	7.0
13 Jan	Noto	–	23.0	19.0	34.0	9.0	4.0	2.0	2.5	1.0	1.5	4.0	11.0
9–10 Jan	Tecnè	2,000	25.5	17.5	30.8	11.7	3.9		3.1			7.5	5.3
7–10 Jan	BiDiMedia	1,096	25.6	18.7	30.8	9.3	3.3	2.4	2.9	0.4	1.4	5.2	5.2
8–9 Jan	Index	800	24.1	17.5	33.1	7.9	4.1	2.9	2.5		2.2	5.7	9.0
8 Jan	Piepoli	505	28.0	17.5	31.5	10.0	3.5	2.5	2.0	0.5		4.5	3.5
8 Jan	EMG	1,540	26.1	19.1	31.0	8.3	4.1		2.0	0.8	2.0	6.6	4.9
6–7 Jan	Tecnè	1,003	24.9	17.8	31.8	10.9	4.2					10.4	6.9
3–7 Jan	SWG	1,500	26.3	17.3	32.2	8.3	3.8	2.8	2.9		2.2	4.2	5.9

=== 2018 ===
Fieldwork date	Polling firm	Sample size	M5S	PD	Lega	FI	FdI	LeU	+E	NcI	PaP	Others	Lead
23–30 Dec	GPF	894	28.6	17.0	31.5	10.7	4.4	2.6	1.9	0.2	1.3	1.8	2.9
20–21 Dec	Ipsos	1,000	27.0	18.1	32.9	8.0	3.5	2.8	2.4	0.8		4.5	5.9
19–21 Dec	Ixè	–	24.8	17.9	31.0	9.9	4.7	3.2	2.1	0.4	1.8	4.2	6.2
17–21 Dec	BiDiMedia	1,018	26.5	16.9	31.4	8.1	3.3	2.2	3.4	0.7	1.7	5.8	4.9
20 Dec	Lorien	1,000	28.5	14.7	31.4	11.0	3.4	2.4	1.8	0.8	1.8	4.2	2.9
10–19 Dec	CISE	1,113	27.1	16.9	30.6	8.3	3.8	3.1	3.8		2.4	4.0	3.5
18 Dec	EMG	1,611	27.9	18.0	31.4	8.5	4.1		2.1	0.9	1.9	5.2	3.5
17 Dec	Tecnè	801	25.3	17.1	32.8	10.8	4.2					9.8	7.5
12–17 Dec	SWG	1,500	26.5	16.8	33.0	8.0	4.0	2.3	2.8		2.4	4.2	6.5
12–14 Dec	Quorum – YouTrend	1,001	28.0	16.8	31.8	9.8	4.9		2.1			6.6	3.8
10–14 Dec	Demos & Pi	1,181	25.7	17.5	32.2	9.1	3.6	3.0	2.5		2.0	4.4	6.5
12–13 Dec	Demopolis	1,500	27.5	16.5	31.8	8.8	3.2					12.2	4.3
12 Dec	Index	800	24.8	17.2	34.8	7.6	4.0	1.8	2.3		2.3	5.2	10.0
10–12 Dec	GPF	800	27.2	17.5	31.5	10.8	4.9	3.1	1.8	0.2	1.4	1.6	4.3
11 Dec	EMG	1,803	26.4	17.7	32.1	8.4	4.0		2.2	0.9	2.0	6.3	5.7
10 Dec	Piepoli	503	28.5	17.0	31.0	10.5	4.0	2.5	2.0	0.5		4.0	2.5
10 Dec	Euromedia	800	24.6	17.3	33.9	9.4	4.2	2.3	3.3	0.4		4.6	9.3
10 Dec	Tecnè	800	25.5	17.0	33.2	10.9	4.0					9.4	7.7
5–10 Dec	SWG	1,500	26.2	17.5	32.0	8.7	3.7	2.3	3.0		2.4	4.2	5.8
6 Dec	Index	–	24.9	17.7	34.7	7.5	4.0	1.7	2.3		2.2	5.0	9.8
4 Dec	EMG	1,784	25.7	18.5	32.1	8.2	4.0		2.2	0.8	2.1	6.4	6.4
28 Nov–3 Dec	SWG	1,500	27.3	17.6	32.0	8.2	3.3	2.4	2.8		2.4	4.0	4.7
1–2 Dec	Tecnè	1,000	25.5	17.7	32.0	11.0	4.3					9.5	6.5
28–29 Nov	Demopolis	1,500	28.0	17.8	32.0	8.6	3.4					10.2	4.0
27–28 Nov	Index	1,500	25.0	17.5	34.5	7.3	4.0	1.8	2.3		2.1	5.5	9.5
27 Nov	EMG	1,803	25.9	18.5	32.0	8.3	4.0		2.1	1.1	2.0	6.1	6.1
27 Nov	Noto	–	25.0	18.0	34.0	9.5	4.0	2.0	2.5	0.4	2.0	2.6	9.0
26 Nov	Tecnè	797	25.9	18.1	31.9	11.2	3.9					9.0	6.0
21–26 Nov	SWG	1,500	26.5	18.0	31.5	8.4	3.5	2.3	2.8		2.6	4.4	5.0
22–24 Nov	Scenari Politici – Winpoll	1,500	26.3	19.0	31.5	9.8	3.7	2.0	2.7	1.1	1.4	2.5	5.2
23 Nov	Lorien	–	28.3	16.8	30.0	11.2	3.6	2.5	2.1	0.5	2.2	2.8	1.7
23 Nov	Tecnè	800	25.8	18.0	32.0	11.3	4.0					8.9	6.2
20–22 Nov	Ipsos	1,000	27.7	16.8	36.2	7.9	2.6	1.5	2.1	0.6		4.6	8.5
19–22 Nov	BiDiMedia	1,081	27.5	17.7	30.0	8.4	3.5	2.3	2.5	0.8	1.5	5.8	2.5
20–21 Nov	Index	800	25.9	18.1	33.3	7.2	3.8	2.0	2.3		2.0	5.4	7.4
20 Nov	EMG	1,603	26.3	18.5	31.1	7.8	3.9	3.4	1.7	1.0	1.8	4.5	4.8
20 Nov	Noto	–	25.0	17.0	33.0	9.0	3.5	2.0	2.5	0.4	2.0	5.6	8.0
14–19 Nov	SWG	1,500	26.4	17.5	32.7	7.8	3.5	2.5	3.0		2.3	4.3	6.3
13–14 Nov	Index	800	26.0	18.2	33.1	7.1	3.7	2.7	2.3			6.9	7.1
13 Nov	EMG	1,538	27.3	18.1	31.2	8.0	3.9	3.1	1.7	0.8	1.7	4.2	3.9
13 Nov	Noto	–	26.0	17.0	32.0	9.0	3.0	3.0	2.5	0.5	2.0	5.0	6.0
12 Nov	Piepoli	512	29.5	16.5	30.5	10.5	4.0	2.5	2.0	0.5		4.0	1.0
12 Nov	Euromedia	800	26.7	17.1	31.3	10.8	4.2	2.9	2.5	0.3		4.2	4.6
11–12 Nov	Tecnè	1,000	26.6	17.8	30.4	11.2	4.2	2.4				7.4	3.8
10–12 Nov	Scenari Politici – Winpoll	1,500	26.8	18.7	31.8	9.6	3.8	2.4	2.5	0.9	1.6	1.9	5.0
7–12 Nov	SWG	1,500	27.4	18.1	31.7	7.4	3.7	2.3	2.7		2.5	4.2	4.3
7–9 Nov	Ixè	1,000	25.9	17.5	29.8	9.4	4.2	2.5	2.9	0.5	1.9	5.4	3.9
6–7 Nov	Index	800	26.3	18.3	32.9	7.0	3.6	2.9	2.3			6.7	6.6
6 Nov	Noto	–	27.0	17.5	31.0	9.0	3.5	3.5	2.5	0.5	2.5	3.0	4.0
4–5 Nov	Demopolis	1,200	28.5	17.3	30.5	8.6	3.4					11.7	2.0
31 Oct–5 Nov	SWG	1,500	28.2	17.5	30.4	8.3	3.9	2.6	2.6		2.3	4.2	2.2
2 Nov	Tecnè	805	27.1	17.6	30.2	11.0	4.1	2.5				7.5	3.1
30–31 Oct	Index	800	26.6	18.1	32.5	7.1	3.6	2.8	2.2			7.1	5.9
29–31 Oct	Ipsos	1,000	28.7	16.5	34.7	8.7	2.7	2.1	2.7	0.4		3.5	6.0
29–31 Oct	Demos	1,001	27.6	16.5	30.0	9.4	3.1	3.1	2.3		2.3	5.7	2.4
27–29 Oct	GPF	798	30.2	16.8	30.1	10.2	4.5	2.4	1.9		1.4	2.5	0.1
24–29 Oct	SWG	1,500	29.0	17.0	30.6	7.9	3.5	2.8	2.7		2.5	4.0	1.6
25–27 Oct	Scenari Politici – Winpoll	1,500	26.5	18.4	32.1	9.2	3.6	2.5	2.6	1.6	1.8	1.7	5.6
24–26 Oct	Ixè	1,000	27.1	17.9	30.7	8.1	3.3	2.2	2.2	0.7	2.1	5.7	3.6
22–26 Oct	BiDiMedia	975	27.1	18.4	30.5	8.0	3.4	2.9	2.6	0.7	1.7	4.7	3.4
24–25 Oct	Index	800	27.4	18.0	31.9	7.2	3.6	2.8	2.1			7.0	4.5
23 Oct	Noto	–	26.0	17.0	31.0	9.0	4.0	3.3	2.0	0.5	2.0	5.2	5.0
17–22 Oct	SWG	1,500	29.1	17.5	30.4	7.6	3.7	2.7	2.7		2.3	4.0	1.3
20–21 Oct	Tecnè	1,000	27.4	17.3	30.6	11.0	3.9	2.6				7.2	3.2
19–21 Oct	EMG	1,528	28.8	17.3	30.6	7.9	4.0	3.2	1.5	0.8	2.0	3.9	1.8
17 Oct	Euromedia	800	27.6	15.9	31.7	10.4	4.1	2.7	2.6	0.4		4.6	4.1
17 Oct	Piepoli	605	29.5	17.0	30.5	10.5	3.5	2.5	2.0	0.5		4.0	1.0
16 Oct	Noto	–	28.5	15.5	32.0	8.0	4.0	3.0	2.0	0.4	2.0	4.6	3.5
15 Oct	Lorien	–	27.5	16.2	30.7	10.6	4.5	2.9	2.4	0.2	2.0	3.0	3.2
15 Oct	GPF	–	31.1	16.2	29.8	10.3	4.3	2.6	2.1			3.6	1.3
10–15 Oct	SWG	1,500	28.1	17.1	30.5	8.0	4.1	2.9	2.6		2.5	4.2	2.4
13–14 Oct	Tecnè	1,000	28.7	17.5	30.4	11.2	3.6	2.1				6.5	1.7
11–13 Oct	Scenari Politici – Winpoll	1,500	26.9	18.6	34.3	7.8	3.8	2.3	2.4	1.4	1.4	1.1	7.4
10–12 Oct	Demopolis	1,500	30.0	17.4	31.5	8.3	3.2	2.1	2.0			5.5	1.5
10–12 Oct	Ixè	1,000	28.2	17.0	31.8	8.7	2.6	2.5	2.5	0.4	2.6	3.7	3.6
9 Oct	Noto	–	27.5	16.0	33.0	9.0	3.5	3.0	2.0	0.4	2.0	3.6	5.5
8 Oct	Tecnè	1,000	28.5	17.0	31.1	11.1	3.5	2.4				6.4	2.6
3–8 Oct	SWG	1,500	29.0	17.2	31.0	8.3	3.5	2.3	2.7		2.1	3.9	2.0
5–7 Oct	EMG	1,530	29.4	16.7	30.7	8.1	3.7	2.9	1.5	0.6	2.1	4.3	1.3
2–4 Oct	Ipsos	1,000	28.5	17.1	33.8	7.8	2.4	2.4	1.9	0.6		5.5	5.3
1–2 Oct	Demopolis	1,500	31.0	16.5	32.5	8.6	3.4	2.3				5.7	1.5
1 Oct	Piepoli	505	30.0	16.5	31.0	10.0	3.5	2.5	2.0	0.5		4.0	1.0
1 Oct	Euromedia	800	29.0	16.2	33.0	9.3	3.6	2.5	2.0	0.4		4.0	4.0
30 Sep–1 Oct	GPF	613	32.1	15.5	30.2	10.2	4.8	2.5	2.2	0.2		2.3	1.9
26 Sep–1 Oct	SWG	1,500	29.8	15.7	32.2	7.3	4.0	2.4	2.6		2.1	3.9	2.3
28 Sep	Ipsos	–	29.7	15.4	34.2	8.4	2.6	2.9	2.3	0.3		4.2	4.5
24–28 Sep	BiDiMedia	867	28.4	17.6	30.4	8.2	3.5	2.5	2.4	0.8	1.8	4.4	4.0
26 Sep	Index	800	28.7	17.5	31.2	8.9	3.1	2.7	2.0			5.9	2.5
25 Sep	Noto	–	28.0	16.0	34.0	9.0	4.0	3.0	2.0	0.5	2.5	1.0	6.0
19–24 Sep	SWG	1,500	28.6	16.3	32.0	8.3	3.7	2.4	2.5		2.2	4.0	3.4
22–23 Sep	Tecnè	1,000	29.2	16.9	32.2	10.9	3.3	2.1		0.4		5.0	3.0
21–23 Sep	GPF	801	31.5	15.1	29.9	10.9	4.7	2.7	2.2	0.2		2.8	1.6
21–23 Sep	EMG	1,469	28.8	16.3	32.3	8.1	3.4	3.2	1.2	0.7	2.4	3.6	3.5
21–22 Sep	Scenari Politici – Winpoll	1,500	26.9	19.8	34.7	8.0	3.8	2.1	2.1	0.8	1.2	0.6	7.8
19–21 Sep	Ixè	1,000	27.6	18.2	31.2	9.0	2.4	2.5	2.6	0.3	2.8	3.4	3.6
20 Sep	Ipsos	–	28.8	16.0	34.6	9.0	2.5	2.9	2.1	0.4		3.7	5.8
18–19 Sep	Index	800	28.9	17.8	30.5	8.8	3.1	2.8	2.0			6.1	1.6
18 Sep	Noto	–	28.0	15.0	34.0	9.0	4.0	3.5	1.5	0.4	1.5	3.1	6.0
17 Sep	Piepoli	510	30.0	17.0	30.0	10.5	3.5	2.5	2.0	0.5		4.0	Tie
17 Sep	Euromedia	800	28.2	16.5	32.6	10.5	3.3	2.6	2.2	0.4		3.7	4.4
15–17 Sep	GPF	798	31.3	15.3	30.4	10.5	4.2	2.6	1.9	0.3		3.5	0.9
12–17 Sep	SWG	1,500	28.7	16.9	31.6	7.0	4.3	2.5	2.6		2.6	3.8	2.9
14–15 Sep	Tecnè	1,000	29.1	17.4	31.2	10.8	3.4	2.3				5.8	2.1
11–13 Sep	Demos	1,002	29.4	17.3	30.2	8.7	2.7	2.9	2.6		2.2	4.0	0.8
11–12 Sep	Demopolis	1,500	30.2	17.0	32.0	8.5	3.0	2.3				7.0	1.8
11 Sep	Noto	–	27.0	16.5	34.0	10.0	3.0	2.5	1.5	0.5	1.5	3.5	7.0
10 Sep	Piepoli	510	30.0	17.0	30.0	10.0	3.5	2.0	2.0	0.5		5.0	Tie
10 Sep	Euromedia	800	28.3	16.9	32.0	10.7	3.5	2.8	2.0	0.4		3.4	3.7
5–10 Sep	SWG	1,500	27.9	17.3	32.1	7.6	3.9	2.3	2.4		2.5	4.0	4.2
7–9 Sep	EMG	1,520	28.9	17.0	30.5	8.5	3.7	2.8	1.6	1.0	2.4	3.6	1.6
6–7 Sep	Scenari Politici – Winpoll	1,500	26.4	20.8	35.0	7.2	4.1	2.3	1.9	0.5	0.9	0.9	8.6
6 Sep	GPF	–	31.8	15.5	30.8	11.3	4.4	2.5	1.6			2.1	1.0
6 Sep	Noto	1,000	27.0	17.0	34.0	9.0	3.0	3.5	1.0	0.5	1.5	3.5	7.0
5–6 Sep	Tecnè	1,000	29.5	17.6	30.3	11.0	3.5	2.0				6.1	0.8
4–6 Sep	Ipsos	1,000	30.0	17.0	33.5	8.7	2.5	2.4	2.4	0.2		3.3	3.5
3–4 Sep	Tecnè	800	29.8	17.5	30.1	10.9	3.7	1.8				6.2	0.3
29 Aug–3 Sep	SWG	1,500	28.3	17.7	32.2	6.9	4.1	2.4	2.6		2.3	3.5	3.9
30 Aug–2 Sep	BiDiMedia	887	28.7	17.8	29.5	8.1	3.3	3.0	2.4	1.0	1.7	4.5	0.8
27 Aug	Piepoli	–	29.0	15.0	30.0	12.0	3.0					11.0	1.0
24–27 Aug	Lorien	500	26.8	16.8	31.7	8.7	4.6	3.7	2.5	0.3	1.9	3.0	4.9
25–30 Jul	SWG	1,500	29.7	17.4	30.3	8.6	3.7	2.4	2.1		2.5	3.3	0.6
26 Jul	Ipsos	–	30.8	17.3	31.7	8.5	2.8	2.2	2.4	0.3		4.0	0.9
24–25 Jul	Demopolis	1,200	31.0	17.8	29.0	9.5	3.5	2.6				6.6	2.0
23 Jul	Ixè	–	29.2	18.2	28.0	9.6	4.1	2.6	2.3	0.2	1.9	3.9	1.2
18–23 Jul	SWG	1,500	29.3	18.1	30.7	7.9	4.1	2.6	1.9		2.0	3.4	1.4
17–18 Jul	Ipsos	1,000	31.5	17.0	31.0	7.7	3.0	2.5	2.8	0.2		4.3	0.5
17 Jul	Lorien	–	28.1	17.8	28.2	11.4	4.2	3.7	2.0	0.6	2.7	1.3	0.1
11–16 Jul	SWG	1,500	29.7	18.0	30.1	8.4	3.9	2.5	1.8		1.9	3.7	0.4
7–13 Jul	BiDiMedia	769	29.0	18.9	28.2	8.3	4.0	2.8	2.1	1.0	1.5	4.2	0.8
5–13 Jul	Termometro Politico	3,400	29.0	18.5	30.3	7.9	3.1	2.0	1.9	1.4	1.5	4.4	1.3
9 Jul	Piepoli	506	29.0	18.0	28.0	12.0	3.0	2.0	2.0	0.5		5.5	1.0
4–9 Jul	SWG	1,500	29.0	17.8	30.5	7.7	4.3	2.3	2.3		1.9	4.2	1.5
6–8 Jul	EMG	1,526	30.0	17.5	27.5	10.2	4.4	3.5	1.6	0.9	1.8	2.6	2.5
27 Jun–2 Jul	SWG	1,500	28.7	17.8	29.8	8.2	4.3	2.7	2.1		2.1	4.3	1.1
7 Jun–2 Jul	Quorum	2,181	28.1	19.3	27.7	9.9	4.0			0.9		10.1	0.4
26–27 Jun	Ipsos	997	29.8	18.9	31.2	8.3	2.3	2.3	2.8	0.4		4.0	1.4
25 Jun	Piepoli	508	29.0	18.0	28.0	12.5	3.0	2.0	2.0	0.5		5.0	1.0
20–25 Jun	SWG	1,500	29.4	18.8	29.7	8.4	3.8	2.4	1.7		1.9	3.9	0.3
23–24 Jun	EMG	1,784	30.8	17.7	27.2	9.9	4.3	3.4	1.9	1.2	1.9	1.7	3.6
19–24 Jun	BiDiMedia	896	28.6	19.2	27.7	8.9	4.0	2.3	1.7	0.9	1.7	5.0	0.9
20 Jun	Tecnè	1,000	27.5	19.6	27.9	11.0	3.3	2.9				7.8	0.4
20 Jun	Lorien	–	29.0	19.2	27.5	11.1	4.5	3.0	1.6	0.1	2.0	2.0	1.5
19–20 Jun	Demopolis	1,500	29.0	19.0	28.0	10.0	3.8	2.5				7.7	1.0
19–20 Jun	Euromedia	800	28.0	16.8	28.3	12.4	4.2	3.0	1.8	0.3		5.2	0.3
19 Jun	Noto	–	27.0	20.0	29.0	9.0	3.5	3.0	2.0	0.5		6.0	2.0
18–19 Jun	Piepoli	504	29.0	18.0	27.0	13.0	3.0	2.0	2.0	0.5		5.5	2.0
13–18 Jun	SWG	1,500	29.0	18.8	29.2	9.2	4.1	2.2	2.0		1.5	4.0	0.2
14–16 Jun	Ixè	1,000	28.5	19.7	28.0	9.5	4.1	3.0	2.0	0.4	1.7	3.1	0.5
11–15 Jun	Termometro Politico	2,300	29.5	21.2	28.7	8.1	2.8	2.3	1.8	1.1	1.2	3.3	0.8
12–13 Jun	Ipsos	1,000	29.9	18.6	30.1	8.7	2.9	2.6	2.0	0.6		4.6	0.2
12–13 Jun	Euromedia	800	29.0	17.5	27.3	12.3	4.3	2.3	1.8	0.3		5.2	1.7
12 Jun	Tecnè	1,001	28.4	19.4	25.6	11.2	3.6	3.1				8.7	2.8
11–12 Jun	Piepoli	506	30.0	18.5	25.5	13.5	3.5	1.5	2.0	0.5		5.0	4.5
6–11 Jun	SWG	1,500	31.5	18.4	27.0	8.6	3.9	2.3	1.9		1.8	4.6	4.5
6 Jun	Index	800	29.2	19.4	26.7	10.0	3.2	2.2		0.3		9.0	2.5
4 Jun	Piepoli	614	31.5	18.5	24.0	14.0	3.0	1.5	2.0	0.5		5.0	7.5
30 May–4 Jun	SWG	1,500	30.9	18.5	27.2	8.8	3.7	2.3	2.2	0.6	1.6	4.2	3.7
1–3 Jun	EMG	1,784	32.0	19.6	22.3	12.0	5.2	3.6	1.6	0.7	1.5	1.5	9.7
30–31 May	Ipsos	1,002	30.1	19.2	28.5	9.0	3.9	3.1	2.0	0.5		3.7	1.6
30–31 May	Index	800	29.0	19.2	26.5	10.1	3.5	1.9		0.3		9.5	2.5
29–31 May	Termometro Politico	6,000	32.2	19.1	26.7	9.9	3.1	1.6	1.5	1.0	0.9	4.0	5.5
29–30 May	Demopolis	1,500	30.0	19.0	26.0	11.0	4.0	3.0				7.0	4.0
29 May	Piepoli	505	31.5	19.0	24.0	13.5	3.5	1.5	1.5	0.5		5.0	7.5
29 May	Euromedia	800	33.7	17.0	23.7	12.5	3.8	2.1	2.0	0.4		4.8	10.0
29 May	Tecnè	806	31.0	17.3	25.0	12.5	3.5	3.0				7.7	6.0
28 May	Noto	–	29.0	17.0	25.0	12.0	3.5	3.5	2.0	0.5		7.5	4.0
23–28 May	BiDiMedia	976	32.4	18.1	24.7	9.8	3.6	2.3	1.8	1.1	1.6	4.6	7.7
23–28 May	SWG	2,100	29.5	19.4	27.5	8.0	3.8	2.7	2.4	0.7	1.9	4.1	2.0
22–24 May	EMG	1,549	32.6	18.1	21.1	13.4	4.9	3.7	1.4	0.6	2.1	2.1	11.5
23 May	Index	800	30.0	18.8	22.5	13.2	4.2	2.1		0.5		8.7	7.5
22–23 May	Demopolis	1,500	32.5	17.0	24.0	11.0	4.0	2.7				8.8	8.5
22 May	Noto	–	30.0	16.5	25.0	12.0	4.0	2.5	2.5	0.5		7.0	5.0
16–20 May	SWG	1,500	31.1	19.1	24.5	9.7	4.7	2.6	1.8	0.6	1.8	4.1	6.6
17–18 May	Demos	1,006	31.1	17.6	22.1	13.2	3.7	2.8	2.5			7.0	9.0
16–18 May	Tecnè	2,000	31.6	18.2	23.2	12.8	3.8	2.8				7.6	8.4
17 May	Piepoli	–	31.5	19.0	21.0	14.0	4.0	2.0	1.5	0.5		6.5	10.5
16–17 May	Ipsos	1,000	32.6	18.1	25.4	12.0	3.4	2.4	1.8	0.6		3.7	7.2
15–17 May	EMG	1,745	31.9	18.1	21.8	12.9	4.8	3.7	1.5	0.6	2.6	2.1	10.1
16 May	Index	800	30.1	19.0	21.8	13.5	4.2	2.1		0.5		8.8	8.3
16 May	Euromedia	800	31.2	17.5	22.3	13.8	4.2	3.0	1.6	0.5		5.9	8.9
15 May	Noto	–	32.5	16.5	22.0	13.0	4.0	2.5	2.0	0.5		7.0	10.5
9–13 May	SWG	1,500	32.1	19.0	25.5	9.8	3.8	2.8	1.8	0.4	1.6	3.2	6.6
10–11 May	Ixè	1,000	31.5	17.8	22.0	12.2	4.1	3.4	1.8	0.5	2.1	4.6	9.5
10 May	Piepoli	–	32.0	19.0	21.0	13.5	3.5	2.5	1.5	0.5		6.5	11.0
9–10 May	Demopolis	1,500	34.0	17.5	23.0	10.0	4.0	2.8				8.7	11.0
9–10 May	Euromedia	800	32.1	18.0	22.8	12.8	3.9	2.9	1.6	0.6		5.3	9.3
8–10 May	EMG	1,611	30.8	18.0	23.2	12.2	4.8	4.3	1.5	0.5	2.4	2.3	7.6
8 May	Tecnè	998	32.0	17.9	22.6	12.9	4.0	3.1				7.5	9.8
7 May	Piepoli	504	32.0	19.0	21.0	13.0	4.0	2.5	1.5	0.5		6.5	11.0
5–6 May	Tecnè	1,500	32.1	17.7	22.3	13.0	4.0	3.0				7.9	9.8
3–6 May	SWG	1,500	32.3	19.0	24.4	9.4	4.4	3.0	1.5	0.3	1.5	4.2	7.9
4 May	Noto	–	35.0	15.5	22.5	12.0	4.0	2.5				8.5	12.5
2–3 May	EMG	1,683	31.5	17.5	23.5	11.8	4.6	3.9	1.4	0.8	2.0	3.0	8.0
2–3 May	Ipsos	1,000	33.7	18.3	21.2	13.1	3.6	2.8	2.2	0.9		4.2	12.5
2 May	Piepoli	–	32.0	18.5	21.0	13.0	4.0	2.5	2.0	1.0		6.0	11.0
2 May	Index	800	33.2	18.1	22.9	12.2	3.9	2.0		0.5		2.2	10.3
30 Apr	Tecnè	1,600	31.8	17.6	22.8	12.6	4.4	3.3				7.5	9.0
30 Apr	Piepoli	505	33.0	18.0	21.0	13.0	4.0	2.5	2.0	1.0		5.5	12.0
30 Apr	Euromedia	800	32.8	18.0	21.8	12.4	4.1	3.1	2.2	0.6		5.0	11.0
24–30 Apr	BiDiMedia	906	34.4	17.1	20.8	11.6	4.6	2.4	2.0	1.2	1.8	4.1	13.6
26–27 Apr	Demos	1,005	32.9	17.8	21.6	12.6	3.8	3.0	2.1			6.2	11.3
26 Apr	Ipsos	–	33.2	19.0	19.4	13.1	4.1	3.0	2.4	1.0		4.8	13.8
24–26 Apr	EMG	1,627	34.5	17.6	22.0	12.5	4.4	3.2	1.3	0.9	1.8	1.8	12.5
23–25 Apr	SWG	2,000	34.3	17.8	23.7	9.9	3.9	2.8	1.7	0.5	1.8	3.6	10.6
23 Apr	Piepoli	500	34.0	17.5	19.5	14.0	3.5	2.0	2.0	1.0		6.5	14.5
20 Apr	Tecnè	1,000	33.5	18.1	21.8	12.6	4.0	2.8				7.2	11.7
18–19 Apr	Ipsos	998	33.5	19.5	19.5	12.9	4.3	2.7	2.2	0.8		4.6	14.0
18 Apr	Index	800	34.0	17.9	22.6	12.0	3.8	2.0		0.4		7.3	11.4
16–18 Apr	SWG	2,000	33.0	18.9	23.2	10.4	4.4	2.4	2.0	0.7	1.5	3.5	9.8
17 Apr	Noto	–	36.0	16.5	21.0	11.5	4.5	2.5	1.5	1.0		5.5	15.0
16 Apr	Piepoli	505	34.5	17.5	19.5	13.5	3.5	2.0	2.0	1.0		6.5	15.0
13 Apr	Euromedia	1,000	34.1	17.8	20.7	12.5	4.0	3.0	2.0	0.5		5.4	13.4
11 Apr	Index	800	34.1	18.3	22.9	11.8	3.7	2.0		0.4		6.8	11.2
9–11 Apr	Ixè	1,000	34.0	16.6	21.0	12.2	4.6	3.6	1.4	0.6	2.4	3.6	13.0
9–11 Apr	SWG	2,000	32.6	19.3	23.5	10.1	4.1	2.7	1.8	0.6	1.8	3.5	9.1
9 Apr	Euromedia	1,000	34.2	17.8	19.5	12.5	4.1	3.1	2.2	0.5		6.1	14.7
9 Apr	Piepoli	508	35.0	17.5	19.5	14.0	3.5	2.0	2.0	1.0		5.5	15.5
5 Apr	Index	800	34.3	18.2	23.0	11.6	3.6	2.0		0.5		6.8	11.3
3–4 Apr	SWG	2,000	34.5	19.0	22.4	9.9	3.8	2.5	1.8	0.8	1.7	3.6	12.1
3 Apr	Tecnè	998	34.0	18.5	19.8	13.2	3.9	2.4	1.9			6.3	14.2
2–3 Apr	Demopolis	1,500	35.0	17.8	20.0	12.5	4.5	3.0				7.2	15.0
28 Mar	Euromedia	800	34.6	17.6	19.4	12.5	4.5	3.2	1.4	1.0		5.8	15.2
28 Mar	Piepoli	510	34.0	17.5	19.0	13.5	4.0	2.5	2.0	1.0		6.5	15.0
28 Mar	Index	800	34.6	17.7	23.5	11.2	3.4	2.0		0.4		7.2	11.1
27–28 Mar	Ipsos	1,000	33.9	18.8	19.2	13.1	4.2	3.0	2.3	0.9		4.6	14.7
26–28 Mar	SWG	2,000	34.1	18.4	21.0	12.1	4.2	2.6	2.0	0.5	1.6	3.5	13.1
21–25 Mar	BiDiMedia	860	33.5	18.0	19.6	12.9	4.4	3.0	1.9	1.2	1.1	4.4	13.9
21 Mar	Index	800	34.9	17.5	23.5	10.9	3.3	2.1		0.6		7.2	11.4
19–21 Mar	SWG	2,000	35.2	19.0	21.6	10.1	3.9	2.4	1.7	0.8	1.5	3.8	13.6
20 Mar	Tecnè	802	34.2	19.0	19.2	13.6	4.2	2.5	2.2			5.1	15.0
19 Mar	Piepoli	508	33.5	18.0	18.0	13.5	4.0	3.0	2.0	1.0		7.0	15.5
19 Mar	Euromedia	800	33.4	18.0	18.8	13.4	4.2	3.3	1.6	1.2		6.1	14.6
12–15 Mar	Demos	1,246	33.8	18.4	18.2	12.8	4.8	4.2	2.2			5.6	15.4
13–14 Mar	SWG	1,000	34.5	18.0	22.3	10.5	3.1	2.8	1.7	1.0	2.0	4.1	12.2
12 Mar	Piepoli	512	34.0	18.5	18.0	14.0	4.0	3.0	2.5	1.0		5.0	15.5
4 Mar	Election results	–	32.7	18.8	17.4	14.0	4.4	3.4	2.6	1.3	1.1	4.3	13.9

== Hypothetical polls ==
=== Polling by age ===
==== Polling among 16-25-year-olds ====
Polls conducted polling solely among under–35-year-olds or breaking out an oversample of this group.

Polling			Parties												
Fieldwork date	Polling firm	Sample size	PD	M5S	Lega	FdI	FI	+E	EV	SI	A	IV	Art. 1	Others	Lead
26–30 Nov 2021	YouTrend	802	22.6	15.1	13.2	11.3	7.5	6.1	5.7	5.7	3.8	3.8	1.9	3.3	7.5

==== Polling among 18-21-year-olds ====
Polls conducted polling solely among 18-21-year-olds or breaking out an oversample of this group.

Polling			Parties										
Fieldwork date	Polling firm	Sample size	FdI	Lega	PD	M5S	FI	A	SI	EV	+E	Others	Lead
8–9 Jul 2021	Tecnè	500	23.0	22.0	21.0	9.0	6.0	6.0	4.0	2.0	2.0	5.0	1.0

==== Polling among 18-24-year-olds ====
Polls conducted polling solely among 18-24-year-olds or breaking out an oversample of this group.

Polling			Parties									
Fieldwork date	Polling firm	Sample size	FdI	Lega	M5S	PD	LeU	FI	IV	+E	A	Lead
17 Mar 2021	Forma Research	—N/a	28.0	20.4	20.3	13.6	5.1	2.4	1.1	1.0	1.0	7.8

==== Polling among 25-34-year-olds ====
Polls conducted polling solely among 25-34-year-olds or breaking out an oversample of this group.

Polling			Parties									
Fieldwork date	Polling firm	Sample size	FdI	Lega	M5S	PD	LeU	FI	IV	+E	A	Lead
17 Mar 2021	Forma Research	—N/a	18.0	26.4	25.9	15.0	4.9	3.0	1.2	1.0	1.3	0.5

==== Polling among under-35-year-olds ====
Polls conducted polling solely among under–35-year-olds or breaking out an oversample of this group.

Polling			Parties																
Fieldwork date	Polling firm	Sample size	FdI	PD	Lega	M5S	A	FI	SI	EV	+E	Volt	Art. 1	Pos	IV	CI	SVP-UV	Others	Lead
3–10 Oct 2021	BiDiMedia	1,895	20.9	19.2	12.7	11.7	7.3	6.8	3.9	3.1	2.4	2.1	1.5	1.5	1.2	0.7	0.5	4.5 (Note: 2.3 – Left-leaning 1.4 – Right-leaning)	1.7

==== Polling among 35-44-year-olds ====
Polls conducted polling solely among 35-44-year-olds or breaking out an oversample of this group.

Polling			Parties									
Fieldwork date	Polling firm	Sample size	FdI	Lega	M5S	PD	LeU	FI	IV	+E	A	Lead
17 Mar 2021	Forma Research	—N/a	17.1	29.3	23.0	15.4	3.0	3.4	1.6	1.1	4.0	0.5

==== Polling among 35-54-year-olds ====
Polls conducted polling solely among 35-54-year-olds or breaking out an oversample of this group.

Polling			Parties																
Fieldwork date	Polling firm	Sample size	FdI	PD	Lega	M5S	A	FI	SI	EV	+E	Volt	Art. 1	Pos	IV	CI	SVP-UV	Others	Lead
3–10 Oct 2021	BiDiMedia	1,895	20.0	15.4	20.5	19.7	3.2	6.4	1.5	1.6	1.4	0.2	1.5	1.0	1.3	1.8	0.5	4.2 (Note: 1.8 – Right-leaning 1.3 – Left-leaning)	0.5

==== Polling among 45-54-year-olds ====
Polls conducted polling solely among 45-54-year-olds or breaking out an oversample of this group.

Polling			Parties									
Fieldwork date	Polling firm	Sample size	FdI	Lega	M5S	PD	LeU	FI	IV	+E	A	Lead
17 Mar 2021	Forma Research	—N/a	14.8	23.3	17.0	15.8	2.9	6.0	4.0	1.5	7.0	6.3

==== Polling among over-55-year-olds ====
Polls conducted polling solely among over-55-year-olds or breaking out an oversample of this group.

Polling			Parties																
Fieldwork date	Polling firm	Sample size	FdI	PD	Lega	M5S	A	FI	SI	EV	+E	Volt	Art. 1	Pos	IV	CI	SVP-UV	Others	Lead
3–10 Oct 2021	BiDiMedia	1,895	18.9	26.1	21.0	15.0	1.6	6.5	1.7	0.7	0.5	0.1	1.5	0.1	2.0	0.3	0.5	3.5 (Note: 1.4 – Right-leaning 1.1 – Left-leaning)	5.1

==== Polling among 55-64-year-olds ====
Polls conducted polling solely among 55-64-year-olds or breaking out an oversample of this group.

Polling			Parties									
Fieldwork date	Polling firm	Sample size	FdI	Lega	M5S	PD	LeU	FI	IV	+E	A	Lead
17 Mar 2021	Forma Research	—N/a	15.0	22.8	14.0	16.0	2.6	12.0	5.4	2.5	7.0	6.8

==== Polling among over-64-year-olds ====
Polls conducted polling solely among over-64-year-olds or breaking out an oversample of this group.

Polling			Parties									
Fieldwork date	Polling firm	Sample size	FdI	Lega	M5S	PD	LeU	FI	IV	+E	A	Lead
17 Mar 2021	Forma Research	—N/a	14.9	16.9	13.5	16.1	2.6	13.8	6.0	3.0	3.3	0.8

== Coalition vote ==
=== 2022 ===
Fieldwork date	Polling firm	Sample size	Centre-right	M5S	Centre-left	A–IV	Others	Lead
25 Sep	Election results	–	43.8	15.6	26.1	7.7	6.8	17.7
9 Sep	Piepoli	–	47.0	11.5	30.0	6.5	5.0	17.0
8–9 Sep	BiDiMedia	3,045	45.7	13.1	28.6	7.0	5.6	16.2
7–9 Sep	Quorum – YouTrend	1,000	47.2	13.8	28.0	5.5	5.5	19.2
6–9 Sep	SWG	1,200	47.2	12.0	27.5	7.5	5.8	19.7
6–9 Sep	Lab2101	1,000	47.1	12.0	31.3	6.7	2.8	15.8
8 Sep	Cluster17	–	44.8	14.1	27.4	6.8	6.8	17.4
7–8 Sep	IZI	1,001	44.2	15.4	28.0	5.5	6.9	16.2
6–8 Sep	Termometro Politico	4,600	46.8	13.3	27.1	5.1	7.7	19.7
6–8 Sep	Tecnè	2,003	48.3	12.2	27.7	6.4	5.4	20.6
7 Sep	Euromedia	800	45.3	13.0	28.3	7.8	5.6	17.0
6–7 Sep	Noto	1,000	46.7	13.5	25.7	7.7	6.4	21.0
6–7 Sep	Index Research	800	45.6	14.0	28.0	7.2	5.2	17.6
5–7 Sep	GDC	1,637	47.3	12.3	27.9	7.7	4.7	19.4
5–7 Sep	EMG	1,000	47.5	13.0	27.0	8.0	4.5	20.5
5–7 Sep	Demos & Pi	1,001	44.3	13.8	28.0	6.8	7.9	16.3
5–7 Sep	Demopolis	3,000	46.5	12.8	29.0	7.0	4.7	17.5
4–7 Sep	BiDiMedia	12,000	45.8	12.0	29.8	6.4	7.3	16.0
3–7 Sep	Hokuto	1,500	45.3	14.5	25.3	7.2	7.6	20.0
4–6 Sep	Ipsos	1,000	47.6	14.5	27.2	6.7	5.0	20.4
1–5 Sep	Tecnè	2,000	48.7	11.9	27.9	6.1	5.4	20.8
31 Aug–5 Sep	CISE	861	41.5	16.6	31.0	5.3	5.6	10.5
2–4 Sep	Quorum – YouTrend	1,000	47.3	12.1	28.5	5.2	6.9	18.8
31 Aug–4 Sep	GPF	3,000	45.6	13.4	28.5	5.3	7.1	17.1
1–2 Sep	Demopolis	2,004	46.8	12.3	29.2	7.0	4.7	17.6
29 Aug–2 Sep	Lab2101	1,000	48.1	11.1	31.5	6.5	2.8	16.6
30–31 Aug	Noto	1,000	47.0	12.5	26.5	8.0	6.0	20.5
30 Aug	Piepoli	–	47.0	11.0	30.5	6.0	5.5	16.5
26–29 Aug	Tecnè	2,000	49.7	10.9	28.5	5.1	5.8	21.2
24–29 Aug	SWG	1,200	45.9	11.6	29.0	6.8	6.7	16.9
24–27 Aug	Quorum – YouTrend	1,005	48.5	11.1	29.5	5.3	5.7	19.0
23–24 Aug	Tecnè	2,000	49.6	10.5	29.0	4.9	6.0	20.6
22–24 Aug	Demopolis	1,408	47.0	11.0	30.5	5.8	5.7	16.5
10–23 Aug	Lab2101	1,500	48.0	10.6	32.1	6.9	2.4	15.9
13–20 Aug	Lab2101	1,000	47.7	10.1	32.4	6.7	3.1	15.3
17–18 Aug	Tecnè	1,506	49.8	10.2	30.0	4.8	5.2	19.8
16–18 Aug	Termometro Politico	4,900	46.2	11.2	28.1	5.4	9.1	18.1
11–14 Aug	GDC	1,379	46.4	10.7	32.4	5.1	5.4	14.0
6–12 Aug	Lab2101	1,000	47.6	10.0	32.5	6.5	3.4	15.1
8–11 Aug	Tecnè	4,002	49.7	9.8	30.6	4.7	5.2	19.1
8–9 Aug	EMG	–	48.0	10.0	31.5	6.0	4.5	16.5
5–7 Aug	Quorum – YouTrend	1,000	49.1	11.0	27.4	4.8	7.7	21.7

== Seat projections ==
=== Chamber of Deputies ===
- 400 seats are available; 201 seats are needed for a majority.
- In some polls, only the 392 constituencies in Italy proper are allocated, while the 8 abroad constituencies are omitted.

Date	Polling firm	Centre-right	M5S	Centre-left	A–IV	SVP–PATT	Italexit	Others/Abroad	Lead	Majority
25 Sep	Election results	237	52	85	21	3	0	2	152	+36
8 Sep	Euromedia	235	34	82	20		0		153	+34
6–7 Sep	Noto	254	34	84	21		4	4	170	+53
5–7 Sep	Demopolis	246	34	92	18			10	154	+45
4–6 Sep	Ipsos	249	37	82	18		8	6	167	+48
1–5 Sep	Tecnè	257	31	84	16				167	+56
29 Aug–2 Sep	Ixè	254	31	95	16		0	4	149	+54
1 Sep	Noto	255	34	86	21		0	4	169	+55
26–29 Aug	Tecnè	259	38	88	13				171	+58
17–18 Aug	BiDiMedia	249	26	100	14	3	0	8	149	+48
9 Aug	SWG	245	27	107	16	3	0	2	138	+44

=== Senate of the Republic ===
- 200 seats are available, plus 6 senators for life; 104 seats are needed for a majority.
- In some polls, only the 196 constituencies in Italy proper are allocated, while the 4 abroad constituencies are omitted.

Date	Polling firm	Centre-right	M5S	Centre-left	A–IV	SVP–PATT	Italexit	Others/Abroad	Lead	Majority
25 Sep	Election results	115	28	44	9	2	0	2	71	+11
8 Sep	Euromedia	113	17	42	10		0		71	+9
6–7 Sep	Noto	127	17	42	9		1	5	85	+23
4–6 Sep	Ipsos	121	19	43	9		4	4	78	+17
1–5 Sep	Tecnè	129	15	42	6				87	+25
29 Aug–2 Sep	Ixè	121	21	46	9		0	3	75	+17
1 Sep	Noto	127	16	42	9		0	6	85	+23
26–29 Aug	Tecnè	129	14	44	4				85	+25
17–18 Aug	BiDiMedia	125	13	51	5	2	0	4	74	+21
9 Aug	SWG	127	12	51	7	2	0	1	76	+23

== Subnational polls ==
=== Abruzzo ===
==== Abruzzo 01 ====
Fieldwork date	Polling firm	Sample size	M5S	FI	PD	Lega	FdI	AVS	NM	+E	UP	ApI	ISP	A–IV	Italexit	IC	SCN	Vita	Others	Lead
25 Sep	Election results	–	18.5	11.1	16.6	8.1	27.9	2.7	0.7	2.0	1.7	0.3	1.1	6.3	1.8	0.6	0.2	0.5	–	11.3
5–8 Sep	GDC	1,287	11.6	7.1	22.4	10.7	25.3	3.3	3.1	2.7	1.8	0.2	0.5	7.2	2.9	0.5	0.3	0.4		2.9
25–28 Aug	GDC	1,050	10.1	7.9	23.1	12.2	24.5	2.7	3.2	2.9	1.6	0.4	0.7	6.3	2.3	1.2	0.4	0.5		1.4
29 Jul–3 Aug	GDC	1,118	9.7	8.2	24.7	13.9	24.1	2.7	1.5	w. A				8.5	1.6	1.6			3.5	0.6

=== Apulia ===
Fieldwork date	Polling firm	Sample size	M5S	FI	PD	Lega	FdI	NM	AVS	+E	A–IV	Italexit	IC	UP	ISP	Lead
25 Sep	Election results	–	28.0	11.5	16.8	5.3	23.6	0.8	3.0	1.9	4.8	1.5	0.7	1.1	1.1	4.4
8–9 Sep	Euromedia	–	24.6	8.6	24.4	3.8	23.7	1.6	3.9	1.4	2.9	1.3	1.3	2.1	0.4	0.2

=== Calabria ===
==== Calabria 01 ====
Fieldwork date	Polling firm	Sample size	M5S	FI	PD	Lega	FdI	AVS	NM	+E	A–IV	Italexit	IC	Others	Lead
25 Sep	Election results	–	29.4	15.6	14.4	5.8	19.0	1.8	1.0	1.1	4.1	1.4	0.9	5.6	10.4
29–31 Aug	Termometro Politico	1,200	20.3	12.7	15.8	8.1	27.2	2.8	1.2	0.9	4.3	3.1	0.5	3.1	6.9

=== Campania ===
==== Senate of the Republic ====
===== Campania 04: Naples =====
Fieldwork date	Polling firm	Sample size	M5S	PD	FI	FdI	Lega	AVS	+E	NM	A–IV	Italexit	IC	UP	ISP	Vita	Others	Lead
25 Sep	Election results	–	41.5	17.1	7.4	12.4	2.1	3.8	2.5	0.4	5.8	1.5	2.0	3.4	–	–	0.3	24.4
29–31 Aug	Quorum	563	25.8	26.6	9.8	15.6	3.3	5.2	2.3	0.0	4.2	1.5	0.4	1.8	0.4	0.3	2.6	0.8

=== Lombardy ===
==== Senate of the Republic ====
===== Lombardy 03: Milan =====
Fieldwork date	Polling firm	Sample size	Lega	PD	M5S	FI	FdI	AVS	+E	PC	A–IV	IC	Others	Lead
25 Sep	Election results	–	6.8	26.1	6.8	6.2	19.0	6.4	6.2	–	16.3	0.3	5.9	7.1
17–18 Aug	Winpoll	500	11.1	33.9	7.0	7.8	21.8	3.9	1.8	1.2	7.7	0.3	3.5	12.1

=== Liguria ===
Fieldwork date	Polling firm	Sample size	M5S	Lega	PD	FI	AVS	FdI	+E	NM	A–IV	Italexit	IC	Others	Lead
25 Sep	Election results	–	12.7	9.3	22.7	6.4	4.4	24.3	3.4	2.1	7.4	2.6	0.5	4.3	1.6
6–8 Sep	EMG	1,200	10.0	8.5	25.0	7.0	5.0	20.0	2.5	7.0	6.5	2.5	0.5	5.5	5.0

=== Tuscany ===
==== Chamber of the Deputies ====
===== Tuscany 06: Prato =====
Fieldwork date	Polling firm	Sample size	Centre-right	Centre-left	M5S	PCI	A–IV	Italexit	Others	Lead
25 Sep	Election results	–	40.2	33.6	10.6	–	9.8	1.6	4.2	6.6
7–8 Sep	Quorum	1,000	39.0	41.6	10.2	1.9	5.1	0.4	1.9	2.6

=== Veneto ===
Fieldwork date	Polling firm	Sample size	Lega	M5S	PD	FI	FdI	AVS	+E	A–IV	Others	Lead
25 Sep	Election results	–	14.5	5.8	16.3	6.8	32.5	3.3	3.0	8.3	9.5	16.2
29 Aug–1 Sep	Demos	800	14.4	6.2	18.3	8.7	30.5	4.2	2.8	7.0	7.9	12.2

== See also ==
- Opinion polling for the 2019 European Parliament election in Italy
