= Association for the Rose in the Fist =

Association for the Rose in the Fist Associazione per la Rosa bel Pugno
- Founded: July 2006
- Dissolved: 5 October 2007
- Merged into: Italian Socialist Party
- Ideology: Social democracy Liberalism
- Political position: Centre-left
- National affiliation: Rose in the Fist, The Union

The Association for the Rose in the Fist (Italian: Associazione per la Rosa bel Pugno) was a social-democratic political association in Italy. It was the so-called "third component" of the Rose in the Fist (RnP), a political alliance composed mainly of the Italian Democratic Socialists (SDI), a social-democratic party, and the Italian Radicals (Rad), a liberal movement.

== History ==
In the 2006 general election the RnP obtained 2.6% of the vote and 18 deputies.

In July 2006 the association was launched in reaction to the crisis that invested the RnP soon after the election, when the federative process between the SDI and Radicals stalled. The group members included Lanfranco Turci (president), Salvatore Buglio, Biagio De Giovanni, Luciano Cafagna and Alberto Benzoni (a SDI member). Most of them were former Democrats of the Left (DS), but, while the first three came from the Italian Communist Party (which had become the Democratic Party of the Left in 1991), Cafagna and Benzoni were former members of the Italian Socialist Party (disbanded in 1994).

In 2007 the dissolution of the RnP seemed inevitable, so that Turci and his association started to work with a different direction: uniting all the so-called "liberal-socialist" forces of Italy in what was named "Secular Liberal Socialist Convention". This convention was primarily aimed at uniting the SDI, the Radicals, Turci's group and other Socialist associations (e.g. Socialism is Freedom of Rino Formica), but also the New Italian Socialist Party (NPSI), The Italian Socialists (SI), the Reformist Socialists (RS), the Italian Democratic Socialist Party, the European Republicans Movement (MRE), the Federation of Liberals (FdL), former Socialists within the DS (the group around Valdo Spini) and all the members of that party who felt dissatisfied of the formation of the Democratic Party (the left-wing of Fabio Mussi and Cesare Salvi, the group around Gavino Angius and that of Peppino Caldarola and Emanuele Macaluso).

In March 2007, during a conference at Bertinoro, the prospect of a new social-democratic party, to be formed on the ashes of both the DS and the SDI, was discussed by Lanfranco Turci and Rino Formica, Peppino Caldarola and Emanuele Macaluso (DS), Enrico Boselli and Roberto Biscardini (SDI), Gianni De Michelis, Alessandro Battilocchio and Mauro Del Bue (NPSI), Bobo Craxi and Saverio Zavettieri (SI), Donato Robilotta (RS), Adriano Musi (MRE) and Enzo Marzo (FdL).

In April 2007, at the national congress of SDI, the party launched a similar proposal: a "Socialist Constituent Assembly", open to all the Italian social democrats and above all to the former members of the old Italian Socialist Party. The proposal was immediately accepted by Lanfranco Turci, Rino Formica, Peppino Caldarola, Emanuele Macaluso, Gianni De Michelis, Alessandro Battilocchio and Mauro Del Bue, Bobo Craxi and Saverio Zavettieri, Valdo Spini and, to some extent, by Gavino Angius and Fabio Mussi, who were all special guests of the congress. The Constituent Assembly was intended to lead to a new social-democratic party (probably named "Italian Socialist Party"), which would form a federation with the Italian Radicals (whose leader Emma Bonino insisted that "the Rose in the Fist" was not dead at the congress), the MRE and the FdL.

On 5 October 2007 the Association was merged into the newly founded Socialist Party, which was renamed the Italian Socialist Party in 2009.
