= Italian Socialist Party (2007) =

Italian Socialist Party Partito Socialista Italiano
- Secretary: Enzo Maraio
- President: Luigi Incarnato
- Founded: 5 October 2007
- Merger of: Italian Democratic Socialists; New Italian Socialist Party (faction); The Italian Socialists (faction); Other minor organisations
- Headquarters: Via Santa Caterina da Siena 57, 00186 Rome
- Newspaper: Avanti! Mondoperaio
- Youth wing: Federation of Young Socialists
- Membership (2016): 20,600
- Ideology: Social democracy
- Political position: Centre-left
- National affiliation: Coalition; Centre-left coalition Electoral list SL (2009); PD (2013–2014); IEI (2017–2018) +Eu (2019); IV (2019–2022); PD–IDP (2022); SUE (2024)
- European affiliation: Party of European Socialists
- European Parliament group: Party of European Socialists (2007–2009)
- International affiliation: Socialist International
- Colors: Red
- Chamber of Deputies: 0 / 400
- Senate: 0 / 205
- European Parliament: 0 / 76
- Regional Councils: 5 / 896

Website
- partitosocialista.it

The Italian Socialist Party (Italian: Partito Socialista Italiano, PSI), known as the Socialist Party (Italian: Partito Socialista, PS) until October 2009, is a social-democratic political party in Italy. The party was established in 2007–2008 by the merger of the following social-democratic parties and groups: Enrico Boselli's Italian Democratic Socialists (legal successor of the Italian Socialist Party), the faction of the New Italian Socialist Party led by Gianni De Michelis, The Italian Socialists of Bobo Craxi, Democracy and Socialism of Gavino Angius, the Association for the Rose in the Fist of Lanfranco Turci, "Socialism is Freedom" of Rino Formica and some other minor organisations.

The PSI was led by Riccardo Nencini from 2008 to 2019. Elected senator with the Democratic Party in 2013 and re-elected in 2018, he was deputy minister of Infrastructures and Transports from 2014 to 2019 (Renzi government and Gentiloni government). Since 2019, the party has been led by Enzo Maraio. Between 2019 and 2022, the PSI sat within the parliamentary group of Italia Viva in the Senate. In the 2022 Italian general election, the party lost its parliamentary representation.

== History ==
=== Foundation ===
A merger of all the parties hailing from the Italian Socialist Party (PSI), disbanded in 1994 as a result of Tangentopoli scandals, and the Italian Democratic Socialist Party (PSDI) was initially proposed by Enrico Boselli during a congress of his Italian Democratic Socialists (SDI) in April 2007. In the event, the party, after having participated in The Olive Tree list, decided not to join the Democratic Party (PD), aiming for a "Socialist Constituent Assembly" (Costituente Socialista) instead.

Some minor parties and associations, including The Italian Socialists of Bobo Craxi, "Socialism is Freedom" of Rino Formica and the Association for the Rose in the Fist of Lanfranco Turci, immediately welcomed Boselli's proposal, while in June 2007 the New Italian Socialist Party (NPSI) divided in two groups: the first, led by Stefano Caldoro and Lucio Barani, opted to join The People of Freedom and retained the NPSI identity; the second, led by Mauro Del Bue and Gianni De Michelis, agreed to join the Socialist Constituent Assembly. Indeed, the two factions elected their secretary in two separate congresses: on 24 June Caldoro was elected secretary by the right-wing faction of the party, while on 7–8 July Del Bue and De Michelis were elected respectively secretary and president by those members who wanted to take part to the foundation of the Socialist Party, whose first meeting took place on 14 July. In practice, for some time the NPSI had two secretaries. Subsequently, on 24 October 2007, the two MEPs elected on the United Socialists for Europe list in the 2004 European Parliament election, De Michelis and Alessandro Battilocchio, joined the Socialist Group in the European Parliament. Battilocchio would later split, re-regroup in the new NPSI and finally join Forza Italia.

At its foundation in October 2007, the Socialist Party (PS) was joined also by Gavino Angius's Democracy and Socialism, a group of former Democrats of the Left most recently affiliated with the Democratic Left. At the 2008 general election, the PS stood alone and Boselli was its candidate for Prime Minister. In the event, the party gained less than 1% of the vote (well below thresholds) and failed to win any seats in the Italian Parliament.

=== Out of Parliament ===
At the first party congress, which took place in July 2008, Riccardo Nencini was elected secretary (replacing Boselli) while Pia Locatelli was elected president. In September, Nencini proposed a new "reformist axis" comprising also the Democratic Party (PD) and the Union of the Centre (UdC), while explaining that the Democrats needed to choose between "reformism" and the "populism" of Italy of Values (IdV). In October 2008, Angius led his group into the PD, proposing that the entire PS should follow him. In reply, Nencini underlined that no former members of the late PSI were leaving the party. In fact, Spini, the only former Socialist in Angius' group, chose to stay in the PS. However, De Michelis left the party soon after.

In the 2009 European Parliament election, the PS formed a joint list named Left and Freedom (SL) with the Movement for the Left (MpS), the Federation of the Greens (FdV), the Democratic Left (SD) and Unite the Left (UlS). SL obtained 3.1% of the vote and no MEPs. Despite this, the PS' national council chose to continue to organise a "secular, libertarian and left-wing" force. This led to the exit of Craxi, who launched the United Socialists in October. However, one month later the PS left SL, later rebranded Left Ecology Freedom (SEL), having refused a full merger. The PS was renamed Italian Socialist Party (PSI), chose to field party lists in support of PD candidates in the forthcoming regional elections, opening the way to Craxi's return.

In the 2010 regional elections the PSI elected a total of 15 regional councillors. The party obtained its best results in Apulia (9.7% with SEL and four councillors), Basilicata (4.6% and one councillor), Umbria (4.2% and two councillors), Campania (3.5% with SEL and two councillors) and Calabria (3.7%). At the second party congress in July, Nencini was re-elected secretary, but the PSI was divided in three: the majority around Nencini supported a "reformist" alliance with the PD, UdC and SEL (excluding IdV and the Communist Refoundation Party), the right-wing "autonomist" wing led by Craxi wanted the party to stand alone and the left "frontist" wing favoured stronger co-operation with SEL. In December 2010, Boselli, long-time SDI leader and PSI founder, who had left active politics after his 2008 defeat, joined the Alliance for Italy (ApI), led by Francesco Rutelli.

=== Return to Parliament ===
In November 2011, Carlo Vizzini, a senator of The People of Freedom (PdL) – the joint centre-right party formed by the union of the early Forza Italia, National Alliance and minor party – and former leader of the PSDI, joined the party, giving it parliamentary representation after more than three years. While leaving the PdL, Vizzini stated: "It seems to me that the PdL is set to become the Italian section of the European People's Party. I come from another tradition: I have been secretary of the PSDI and I was one of the founders of the Party of European Socialists. When I joined Forza Italia there were Liberals, Socialists, Radicals. Now everything has changed". Vizzini was soon elected president of the PSI. The party did well in the 2012 local elections. In Carrara, the Socialist mayor Angelo Zubbani was re-elected by a landslide and the party obtained 14.4% of the vote. The PSI also won 15.1% in Todi, 8.9% in Narni, 7.2% in Civitanova Marche, 9.5% in Frosinone, 11.8% in Paola and 9.4% in Trapani. In the 2013 Basilicata regional election the PSI won 7.5% of the vote.

In the 2013 general election the PSI was part of the "Italia. Bene Comune" centre-left coalition headed by PD leader Pier Luigi Bersani, whom the PSI had supported in the centre-left primary election. The party obtained four deputies and two senators, including Nencini, from the lists of the PD and right after supported Enrico Letta's government. During the third party congress in November 2013, Nencini was re-elected secretary, beating Franco Bartolomei of the "frontist" left and Angelo Sollazzo of the "autonomist" wing. In 2015, Bartolomei, Alberto Benzoni and Felice Besostri set up the leftist Risorgimento Socialista and were excluded from the party.

=== Renzi government and splits ===
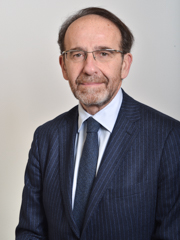
Riccardo Nencini in 2018

When Letta was replaced by Matteo Renzi with strong support from the PSI in February 2014, Nencini was appointed deputy minister of Infrastructures and Transports in Renzi government. In the summer of 2015, Marco Di Lello, party leader in the Chamber, went so far as proposing the merger of the PSI into the PD and announced that were the party not to follow his proposal, he would join the PD. In November, Di Lello along with Lello Di Gioia, another deputy, left the PSI and formed along with a deputy of the PD the Socialists and Democrats (S&D) as a faction within the PD. Contextually, Carmelo Lo Monte, elected in 2013 with the Democratic Centre, joined the PSI's sub-group and the party as a full member.

During the fourth party congress in April 2016, Nencini was unopposed. However, Socialist Area, a faction launched in November 2015 by Craxi (who had changed sides within the party), Roberto Biscardini, Gerardo Labellarte and Angelo Sollazzo, who criticised the party's "acritical" support to Renzi government and Nencini's double role as party leader and deputy minister while proposing a more left-wing positionment for the party as opposed to PD–PSI's "centrism", chose not to participate in the congress, a decision that marked the split from the party. Otherwise, the party was endorsed by Tommaso Nannicini, Renzi's undersecretary and economic advisor, who would later join the PD anyway.

After dismal results in the 2015 regional elections with the exception of Umbria (3.5%), the PSI did well in the 2016 local elections, especially its strongholds in medium-sized cities. In Città di Castello, the Socialist mayor Luciano Bacchetta was re-elected in the first round and the party obtained 21.5% of the vote. The PSI also won 11.7% in Finale Emilia, 10.2% in Sulmona, 14.7% in Frattaminore, 8.2% in Salerno, 12.1% in Melfi and 10.1% in Cassano all'Ionio.

Nencini was confirmed as deputy minister of Infrastructures and Transports in the government led by Paolo Gentiloni (PD) in December 2016. In the 2017 local elections the party obtained its best results in Nocera Inferiore (13.2%), Palmi (12.0%), Galatina (9.5%), Narni (8.6%) and Trapani (8.8%) while losing ground in its historical stronghold of Carrara (6.5%), where a Socialist was the incumbent term-limited mayor. In September 2017 Michela Marzano, originally elected with the PD, joined the PSI sub-group in the Chamber as an independent while Lo Monte left in November. In the 2017 Sicilian regional election the party, in alliance with Future Sicily, obtained 6.0% of the vote.

=== 2018 general and 2019 EP elections ===
In the run-up to the 2018 general election the PSI, the Greens and Civic Area formed the Together electoral list. The list obtained a mere 0.6% of the vote and no seats, but Nencini was re-elected to the Senate from the single-seat constituency of Arezzo and Fausto Longo was elected in an overseas constituency from the PD's list. Nencini joined the Mixed Group, while Longo joined a sub-group of the Mixed Group composed of minor centre-left parties, such as Popular Alternative. In March 2019, during a party congress, Enzo Maraio was elected secretary to replace Nencini, who was later elected president.

In the 2019 European Parliament election the PSI ran within an electoral list led by More Europe, a liberal party, latest re-incarnation of the Radical Party, which obtained 3.1% of the vote and no seats. In the 2019 Basilicata regional election the party won 3.8% in one of its residual strongholds. In September 2019 the PSI was instrumental in the formation of the parliamentary group of Italia Viva, Renzi's new party, in the Senate.

=== 2022 general election and aftermath ===
Logo of Forward PSI

In July 2022 the party announced it would join the Democratic and Progressive Italy list led by Enrico Letta, within the centre-left coalition, for the 2022 general election. In 2023 a group of dissidents formed the Liberal Socialist Movement (MSL), under the leadership of Oreste Pastorelli. They included former leader Nencini, Craxi (who did not leave the party), Del Bue, Enrico Buemi, Ugo Intini and Giovanni Crema. Together with the new party, an online newspaper named La Giustizia, edited by Del Bue, was launched.

In March 2024, in the run-up of the 2024 European Parliament election, the party was a founding member of a broad, liberal and pro-Europeanist list named "United States of Europe" (SUE), along with More Europe, Italia Viva, the Italian Radicals and the European Liberal Democrats, in order to overcome the 4% electoral threshold. In late April the list was joined also by L'Italia c'è. As opposed to the PSI, the recently-formed ASL joined the electoral list led by Action. In the election, SUE and Action obatained 3.8% and 3.4% of vote, respectively, and no seats.

At the extraordinary congress held in March 2025 Maraio was re-elected secretary unopposed. In the 2025 regional elections the party ran under the banner of "Forward", from the Socialist newspaper Avanti!, obtaining 1.4% in Marche, 5.9% in Campania and 4.1% in Apulia, or, otherwise, along with Italia Viva, obtaining 4.4% in Calabria, 8.9% in Tuscany and 2.1% in Veneto (where also the "Forward" banner was displayed). In the aftermath of the elections, in Campania Maraio was appointed by president Roberto Fico as regional minister of Tourism, Territorial Marketing and Digital Transition.

In October 2026, senator Luigi Nave left the Five Star Movement's parliamentary group and joined the Mixed Group in the Senate, where he established the component "Avanti PSI" ("Forward PSI", connected to the PSI "Forward" list in Campania), which was later renamed "Avanti PSI - Progetto Civico Italia" ("Forward PSI - Civic Project Italy"). The goal was to allow PSI and Civic Project Italy to run in the next general elections by reducing the signatures required to present a list.

== Popular support ==
Similarly to its precursors (SI, SDI and NPSI), the PSI has its strongholds in southern and central Italy. In the 2008 general election, the first and latest general election the PSI fought with its own list, the party obtained 1.8% in Umbria, 1.5% in Campania, 1.6% in Apulia, 2.8% in Basilicata and 2.0% in Calabria (2.8% for the Senate). In the 2010 regional elections, the party confirmed its strength in its strongholds: 4.2% in Umbria, 3.5% in Campania, 9.7% in Apulia (along with SEL), 4.6% in Basilicata and 3.7% in Calabria. In the 2013 Basilicata regional election, the party increased its percentage of the vote to 7.5% in Basilicata.

In the 2015 regional elections. the PSI formed joint lists with the PD in several cases, while obtaining 3.5% in Umbria with its own list. In the 2019 Basilicata regional election, the party fell to 3.8%, which was still one of the party's best results as a stand-alone list at the time. In the 2020 regional elections, the party formed mainly joint lists or did not stand, with the notable exception of Campania, where it won 2.6%. In the 2025 regional elections the party confirmed its relative strength in southern Italy, with 5.9% in Campania and 4.1% in Apulia.

== Election results ==
=== Italian Parliament ===
| Election | Leader | Chamber of Deputies | | | | Senate of the Republic | | | |
| Election | Leader | Votes | % | Seats | +/− | Votes | % | Seats | +/− |
|---|---|---|---|---|---|---|---|---|---|
| 2008 | Enrico Boselli | 355,575 (10th) | 0.98 | 0 / 630 | – | 285,802 (9th) | 0.9 | 0 / 315 | – |
| 2013 | Riccardo Nencini | into PD | – | 4 / 630 | ▲4 | 57,688 (13th) | 0.2 | 3 / 315 | ▲3 |
| 2018 | Riccardo Nencini | into Together | – | 1 / 630 | ▼3 | into Together | – | 1 / 315 | ▼2 |
| 2022 | Enzo Maraio | into PD–IDP | – | 0 / 400 | ▼1 | into PD–IDP | – | 0 / 200 | ▼1 |

=== European Parliament ===
| Election | Leader | Votes | % | Seats | +/– | EP Group |
|---|---|---|---|---|---|---|
| 2009 | Riccardo Nencini | Into SeL | | 0 / 72 | New | – |
| 2014 | Riccardo Nencini | Into PD | | 0 / 73 | 0 | – |
| 2019 | Enzo Maraio | Into +E | | 0 / 76 | 0 | – |
| 2024 | Enzo Maraio | Into USE | | 0 / 76 | 0 | – |

=== Regional Councils ===
| Election year | Region | Votes | % | Seats | +/− |
|---|---|---|---|---|---|
| 2024 | Abruzzo | into Reformists and Civics | – | 0 / 31 | – |
| 2020 | Aosta Valley | – | – | 0 / 35 | – |
| 2020 | Apulia | into Solidary and Green Apulia | – | 0 / 51 | – |
| 2024 | Basilicata | into AVS | – | 1 / 21 | ▲1 |
| 2021 | Calabria | 7,024 (19th) | 0.9 | 0 / 30 | – |
| 2020 | Campania | 60,100 (13th) | 2.6 | 1 / 51 | – |
| 2020 | Emilia-Romagna | with +E and PRI | – | 0 / 50 | – |
| 2023 | Friuli-Venezia Giulia | – | – | 0 / 48 | – |
| 2023 | Lazio | 7,974 (16th) | 0.5 | 0 / 51 | – |
| 2020 | Liguria | with IV and +E | – | 0 / 31 | – |
| 2023 | Lombardy | – | – | 0 / 80 | – |
| 2020 | Marche | with IV and DemoS | – | 0 / 31 | ▼2 |
| 2023 | Molise | into Democratic and Socialist Molise | – | 0 / 21 | – |
| 2019 | Piedmont | – | – | 0 / 50 | – |
| 2024 | Sardinia | 11,637 (17th) | 1.7 | 1 / 60 | ▲1 |
| 2022 | Sicily | into PD | | 0 / 70 | – |
| 2023 | South Tyrol | into PD | – | 0 / 35 | – |
| 2023 | Trentino | | | 0 / 35 | – |
| 2020 | Tuscany | into Proud Tuscany for Giani | – | 0 / 41 | – |
| 2019 | Umbria | into Bianconi for Umbria | | 0 / 21 | ▼1 |
| 2020 | Veneto | into Daniela Sbrollini for President | – | 0 / 51 | – |

== Leadership ==
- Secretary: Enrico Boselli (2007–2008), Riccardo Nencini (2008–2019), Enzo Maraio (2019–present)
  - Deputy Secretary: Rita Cinti Luciani (2019–2022), Francesca Rosa D'Ambra (2019–2022), Vincenzo Iacovissi (2019–present), Salvatore Oddo (2020–present), Daria De Luca (2025–present)
  - Coordinator: Marco Di Lello (2008–2014), Gian Franco Schietroma (2014–2018), Luigi Iorio (2019–present)
  - Treasurer: Oreste Pastorelli (2008–2022), Marco Strada (2022–president)
- President: Pia Locatelli (2008–2010), Carlo Vizzini (2014–2019), Riccardo Nencini (2019–2022), Luigi Incarnato (2022–present)
