= Third Berlusconi government =

58th government of the Italian Republic

Berlusconi III Cabinet
- 58th Cabinet of Italy

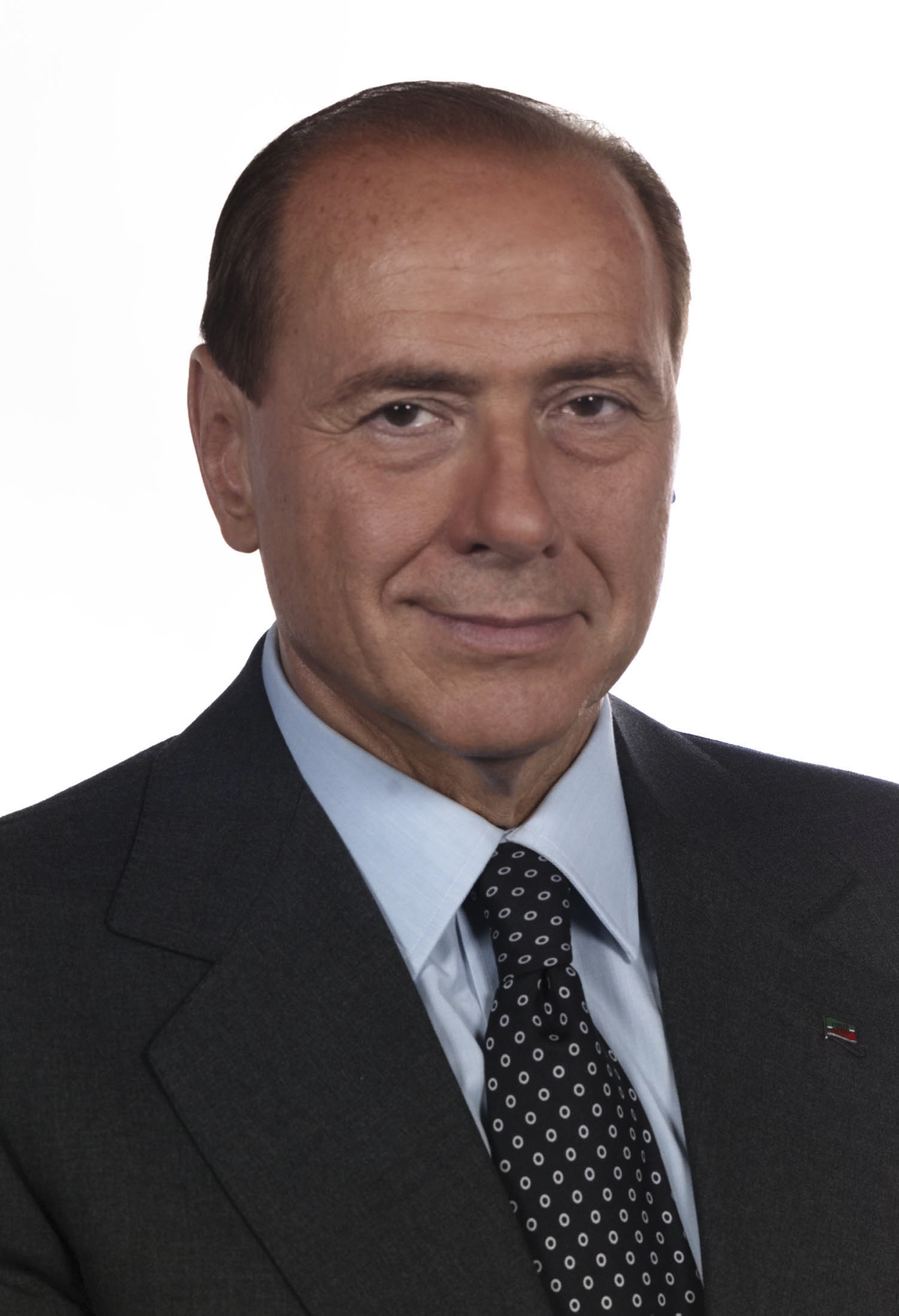
- Date formed: 23 April 2005
- Date dissolved: 2 May 2006 (375 days)

People and organisations
- Head of state: Carlo Azeglio Ciampi
- Head of government: Silvio Berlusconi
- No. of ministers: 25 (incl. Prime Minister)
- Ministers removed: 1
- Total no. of members: 26 (incl. Prime Minister)
- Member parties: FI, AN, UDC, LN, NPSI, PRI
- Status in legislature: Centre-right coalition
- Opposition parties: DS, DL, PRC, UDEUR, SDI, FdV, PdCI

History
- Incoming formation: Berlusconi III Cabinet formation, 2005
- Outgoing election: 2006 election
- Legislature term: XIV Legislature (2001 – 2006)
- Predecessor: Second Berlusconi government
- Successor: Second Prodi government

The third Berlusconi government was the cabinet of the government of Italy from 23 April 2005 to 17 May 2006. It was the 58th cabinet of the Italian Republic, and the second cabinet of the XIV Legislature.

== Formation ==
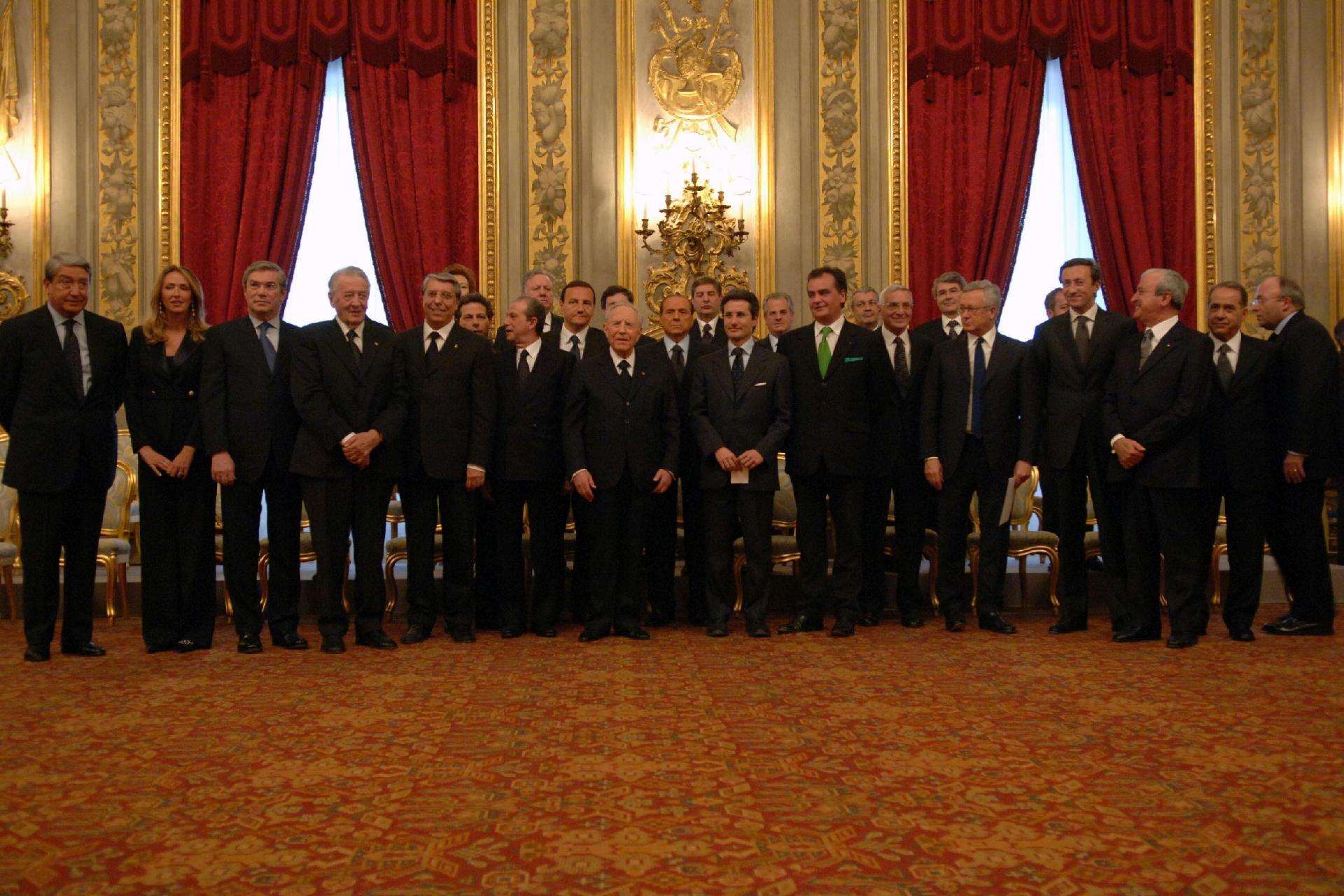
Official photo of the Berlusconi's government after the oath at the Quirinal Palace

House of Freedoms did not do as well in the 2003 local elections as it did in the 2001 national elections. In common with many other European governing groups, in the 2004 elections of the European Parliament, gaining 43.37% support. Forza Italia's support was also reduced from 29.5% to 21.0% (in the 1999 European elections Forza Italia had 25.2%). As an outcome of these results the other coalition parties, whose electoral results were more satisfactory, asked Berlusconi and Forza Italia for greater influence in the government's political line.

In the 2005 regional elections (3-4 April 2005), the centre-left gubernatorial candidates won in 12 out of 14 regions where control of local governments and governorships was at stake. Berlusconi's coalition kept only two of the regional bodies (Lombardy and Veneto) up for re-election. Three parties, Union of Christian and Centre Democrats, National Alliance and New Italian Socialist Party, threatened to withdraw from the Berlusconi government. The Italian Premier, after some hesitation, then presented to the President of the Republic a request for the dissolution of his government on 20 April 2005. On 23 April he formed a new government with the same allies, reshuffling ministers and amending the government programme. A key point required by the Union of Christian and Centre Democrats (and to a lesser extent by National Alliance) for their continued support was that the strong focus on tax reduction central to the government's ambitions be changed.

== New electoral law ==
During this second cabinet was also approved a new electoral law. A white paper for a proportional-only electoral system was presented to the Chamber of Deputies on September 13, 2005, only seven months before the 2006 general election. This reform, strongly backed by the Union of Christian and Centre Democrats, proposed a 4% election threshold before a party gained any seats, and a majority bonus of (at least) 340 seats for the winning coalition, the total votes for each coalition being the sum of the votes of those coalition parties which had won at least 4% of the national votes. The new proposal was approved by parliament.

An electoral survey published on September 15, 2005 by La Repubblica said that, with the initial proposal of electoral reform become law, the House of Freedoms would win the next elections 340-290, even if they won only 45% of votes and the opposition coalition The Union won 50%, because the Union also includes several small parties with less than 4% of national votes. This could have been avoided if the small opposition parties ran on a common ticket. Aim of this bill of reform was to reduce the number of parties, and particularly the moderate left would have taken advantage in respect to the smaller radical left parties.

The Union of Christian and Centre Democrats, commenting on the proposal, asked for the abolition of the 4% cut-off clause, whereas the National Alliance did not show any favour to this attempt of reform, with its leader Gianfranco Fini claiming to want first to vote for the constitutional reform, and then for the new voting system, on condition that the 4% cut-off were not repealed.

This proposal of law was strongly questioned by the opposition coalition, who defined it an "attempted coup". Opposition leader Romano Prodi said it was "totally unacceptable". Critics nicknamed the electoral system proposal by the House of Freedoms as "Truffarellum", after "truffa" (Italian for "fraud") and the "Mattarellum", (from Sergio Mattarella), the most common name for the previous Italian electoral law (there is a recent custom to nickname new electoral systems by a somewhat Latinised version of the name of the lawmaker; another one is the system used in regional elections, the so-called "Tatarellum" from Pinuccio Tatarella).

Notably, some smaller opposition parties, such as Communist Refoundation Party and UDEUR, support a proportional electoral law; nevertheless, they declared they were against an electoral reform by this parliament, because the current law would be changed too close to the 2006 general election.

The Italian prime minister Silvio Berlusconi had previously been a strong supporter of the plurality-based electoral law; in 1995, talking about his coalition, he even defined the plurality principle as "our religion".

A modified version of the first proposal, this time with a 2% threshold for entering Parliament and without vote of preference for candidates, but still without the support of the opposition, was presented to the Chamber of Deputies. The voting count started on October 11; the lower house of Italian parliament then approved the electoral reform on October 14. The new electoral was then eventually approved on December 16, 2005, and countersigned by President Ciampi on December 23, 2005.

Roberto Calderoli, the main author of this electoral reform, defined this law "a rascality" (using the mildly vulgar term "porcata").

Ironically, the new electoral law allowed Romano Prodi to count on a large majority in the Chamber and to obtain majority also in the Senate, where The House of Freedoms actually had more votes (49.88% vs. 49.18% of the Union).

== Party breakdown ==
=== Beginning of term ===
==== Ministers ====
- Forza Italia
11
- National Alliance
5
- Northern League
3
- Union of Christian and Centre Democrats
3
- New Italian Socialist Party
1
- Italian Republican Party
1

==== Ministers and other members ====
- Forza Italia (FI): Prime minister, 1 Deputy Prime minister, 10 ministers, 35 undersecretaries
- National Alliance (AN): 6 ministers (incl. 1 Deputy Prime minister), 16 undersecretaries
- Union of Christian and Centre Democrats (UDC): 3 ministers, 9 undersecretaries
- Northern League (LN): 3 ministers, 9 undersecretaries
- New Italian Socialist Party (NPSI): 1 minister, 2 undersecretaries
- Italian Republican Party (PRI): 1 minister, 1 undersecretary
- Independents: 1 minister, 1 undersecretary

=== End of term ===
==== Ministers ====
- Forza Italia
10
- National Alliance
6
- Northern League
3
- Union of Christian and Centre Democrats
3
- New Italian Socialist Party
1
- Italian Republican Party
1
- Independents
1

==== Ministers and other members ====
- Forza Italia (FI): Prime minister, 9 ministers, 3 deputy ministers, 32 undersecretaries
- National Alliance (AN): 5 ministers (incl. 1 Deputy Prime minister), 3 deputy ministers, 12 undersecretaries
- Union of Christian and Centre Democrats (UDC): 3 ministers, 1 deputy minister, 8 undersecretaries
- Northern League (LN): 3 ministers, 9 undersecretaries
- New Italian Socialist Party (NPSI): 1 minister, 1 deputy minister, 1 undersecretary
- Italian Republican Party (PRI): 1 minister, 1 deputy minister
- Independents: 1 undersecretary

== Composition ==
Portrait	Office	Name	Term	Party	Deputy Ministers Undersecretaries
	Prime Minister	Silvio Berlusconi	23 April 2005 – 17 May 2006	Forza Italia	Undersecretaries: Gianni Letta (Ind.); Paolo Bonaiuti (FI)
	Deputy Prime Minister	Giulio Tremonti	23 April 2005 – 8 May 2006	Forza Italia	Undersecretaries: Gianni Letta (Ind.); Paolo Bonaiuti (FI)
	Deputy Prime Minister	Gianfranco Fini	23 April 2005 – 17 May 2006	National Alliance	Undersecretaries: Gianni Letta (Ind.); Paolo Bonaiuti (FI)
	Minister of Foreign Affairs	Gianfranco Fini	23 April 2005 – 17 May 2006	National Alliance	Undersecretaries: Roberto Antonione (FI); Giampaolo Bettamio (FI); Margherita Boniver (FI); Giuseppe Drago (UDC); Alfredo Mantica (AN)
	Minister of the Interior	Giuseppe Pisanu	23 April 2005 – 17 May 2006	Forza Italia	Undersecretaries: Maurizio Balocchi (LN); Antonio D'Alì (FI); Gianpiero D'Alia (UDC); Alfredo Mantovano (AN); Michele Saponara (FI)
	Minister of Justice	Roberto Castelli	23 April 2005 – 17 May 2006	Northern League	Undersecretaries: Pasquale Giuliano (FI); Jole Santelli (FI); Giuseppe Valentino (AN); Luigi Vitali (FI)
	Minister of Economy and Finance	Domenico Siniscalco	23 April 2005 – 22 September 2005	Independent	Deputy Ministers: Mario Baldassarri (AN) (Note: Undersecretary until 1 July 2005) (since 1 July 2005); Giuseppe Vegas (FI) (since 1 July 2005); Undersecretaries: Maria Teresa Armosino (FI); Manlio Contento (AN); Daniele Molgora (LN); Michele Vietti (UDC)
	Minister of Economy and Finance	Giulio Tremonti	22 September 2005 – 8 May 2006	Forza Italia	Deputy Ministers: Mario Baldassarri (AN) (since 1 July 2005); Giuseppe Vegas (FI) (since 1 July 2005); Undersecretaries: Maria Teresa Armosino (FI); Manlio Contento (AN); Daniele Molgora (LN); Michele Vietti (UDC)
	Minister of Economy and Finance	Silvio Berlusconi (ad interim)	8 May 2006 – 17 May 2006	Forza Italia	Deputy Ministers: Mario Baldassarri (AN) (since 1 July 2005); Giuseppe Vegas (FI) (since 1 July 2005); Undersecretaries: Maria Teresa Armosino (FI); Manlio Contento (AN); Daniele Molgora (LN); Michele Vietti (UDC)
	Minister of Productive Activities	Claudio Scajola	23 April 2005 – 17 May 2006	Forza Italia	Deputy Ministers: Adolfo Urso (AN) (Note: Undersecretary until 23 May 2005) (since 23 May 2005); Undersecretaries: Giovambattista Caligiuri (FI); Roberto Cota (LN); Giuseppe Galati (UDC); Mario Valducci (FI)
	Minister of Education, University and Research	Letizia Moratti	23 April 2005 – 17 May 2006	Forza Italia	Deputy Ministers: Guido Possa (FI) (since 23 May 2005); Giovanni Ricevuto (NPSI); Undersecretaries: Valentina Aprea (FI); Maria Grazia Siliquini (AN)
	Minister of Labour and Social Security	Roberto Maroni	23 April 2005 – 17 May 2006	Northern League	Undersecretaries: Alberto Brambilla (LN); Saverio Romano (UDC); Roberto Rosso (FI); Maurizio Sacconi (FI); Grazia Sestini (FI); Pasquale Viespoli (AN)
	Minister of Defense	Antonio Martino	23 April 2005 – 17 May 2006	Forza Italia	Undersecretaries: Filippo Berselli (AN); Francesco Bosi (UDC); Salvatore Cicu (FI); Rosario Giorgio Costa (FI)
	Minister of Agriculture, Food and Forestry Policies	Gianni Alemanno	23 April 2005 – 17 May 2006	National Alliance	Undersecretaries: Teresio Delfino (UDC); Gianpaolo Dozzo (LN); Paolo Scarpa (FI)
	Minister of the Environment	Altero Matteoli	23 April 2005 – 17 May 2006	National Alliance	Deputy Ministers: Francesco Nucara (PRI) (since 23 May 2005); Undersecretaries: Stefano Stefani (LN); Roberto Tortoli (FI)
	Minister of Infrastructure and Transport	Pietro Lunardi	23 April 2005 – 17 May 2006	Forza Italia	Deputy Ministers: Ugo Martinat (AN) (since 23 May 2005); Mario Tassone (UDC) (since 23 May 2005); Undersecretaries: Federico Bricolo (LN); Mauro Del Bue (NPSI); Silvano Moffa (AN); Paolo Uggè (FI); Guido Viceconte (FI); Nino Sospiri (AN) (until 2 January 2006)
	Minister of Health	Francesco Storace	23 April 2005 – 11 March 2006	National Alliance	Undersecretaries: Elisabetta Casellati (FI); Cesare Cursi (AN); Domenico Di Virgilio (FI); Domenico Zinzi (UDC)
	Minister of Health	Silvio Berlusconi (ad interim)	11 March 2006 – 17 May 2006	Forza Italia	Undersecretaries: Elisabetta Casellati (FI); Cesare Cursi (AN); Domenico Di Virgilio (FI); Domenico Zinzi (UDC)
	Minister of Cultural Heritage and Activities	Rocco Buttiglione	23 April 2005 – 17 May 2006	Union of Christian and Centre Democrats	Deputy Ministers: Antonio Martusciello (FI) (Note: Undersecretary until 18 July 2005) (since 18 July 2005); Undersecretaries: Nicola Bono (AN); Mario Pescante (FI)
	Minister of Communications	Mario Landolfi	23 April 2005 – 17 May 2006	National Alliance	Undersecretaries: Massimo Baldini (FI); Paolo Romani (FI)
	Minister of Regional Affairs (without portfolio)	Enrico La Loggia	23 April 2005 – 17 May 2006	Forza Italia	Undersecretaries: Alberto Gagliardi (FI); Luciano Gasperini (LN)
	Minister for the Implementation of the Government Program (without portfolio)	Stefano Caldoro	23 April 2005 – 17 May 2006	New Italian Socialist Party	Undersecretaries: Giovanni Dell'Elce (FI)
	Minister of Public Function (without portfolio)	Mario Baccini	23 April 2005 – 5 May 2006	Union of Christian and Centre Democrats	Undersecretaries: Learco Saporito (AN)
	Minister for Innovation and Technologies (without portfolio)	Lucio Stanca	23 April 2005 – 17 May 2006	Forza Italia	
	Minister of Italians in the World (without portfolio)	Mirko Tremaglia	23 April 2005 – 17 May 2006	National Alliance	
	Minister for Equal Opportunities (without portfolio)	Stefania Prestigiacomo	23 April 2005 – 17 May 2006	Forza Italia	
	Minister of Community Affairs (without portfolio)	Giorgio La Malfa	23 April 2005 – 17 May 2006	Italian Republican Party	
	Minister for Institutional Reforms and Devolution (without portfolio)	Roberto Calderoli	23 April 2005 – 20 February 2006	Northern League	Undersecretaries: Aldo Brancher (FI); Nuccio Carrara (AN)
	Minister for Parliamentary Relations (without portfolio)	Carlo Giovanardi	23 April 2005 – 17 May 2006	Union of Christian and Centre Democrats	Undersecretaries: Cosimo Ventucci (FI); Gianfranco Conte (FI)
	Minister for Development and Territorial Cohesion (without portfolio)	Gianfranco Micciché	23 April 2005 – 17 May 2006	Forza Italia	

== Sources ==
- Italian Government - Berlusconi III Cabinet
