= Mauro Del Bue =

Italian politician

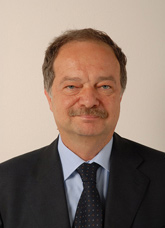

Member of the Chamber of Deputies
- In office 2 July 1987 – 14 April 1994
- In office 28 April 2006 – 28 April 2008

Personal details
- Born: 23 April 1951 (age 75) Reggio Emilia, Italy
- Party: PSI (1971–1994); SDI (1998–2000); LS (2000–2001); NPSI (2001–2007); PSI (since 2007)
- Education: University of Bologna
- Profession: Politician, journalist

Mauro Del Bue (born 23 April 1951 in Reggio Emilia), is an Italian politician and journalist.

== Biography ==
Graduated in literature and philosophy, Mauro Del Bue is journalist by profession.

He was secretary of the Italian Socialist Youth Federation of Reggio Emilia in 1973, city councilor and leader of the Italian Socialist Party in 1975, secretary of the PSI of Reggio Emilia in 1977, from the Rome congress of 1976 he was a member of Central Committee of the PSI on behalf of the FGSI. He also was deputy mayor of Reggio Emilia in 1987 with the departments of culture and sport.

Del Bue was elected Deputy for the first time in 1987 and in 1992 he was re-elected. In 1992 he was among the members of the component of PSI "Socialist Renewal", led by Claudio Martelli.

In 2001 Del Bue joined the New Italian Socialist Party, of which he became the deputy secretary in 2003. From 2005 to 2006 he served as undersecretary to the Ministry of Infrastructure and Transport in the Berlusconi III Cabinet. In 2006 he was again elected Deputy among the ranks of the DC–PS list, in the centre-right coalition. In 2007, following 2 separate congresses of the Socialist Party – New PSI, Del Bue and Stefano Caldoro were appointed secretaries of the same party. Finally, Del Bue, together with Gianni De Michelis and the left wing of the party that supported him joined the Socialist constituent, while the right-wing that supported Caldoro joined The People of Freedom.

In 2009, following the local elections, he was appointed Assessor for Sport of the Municipality of Reggio Emilia by the mayor Graziano Delrio. In May 2013 he was also entrusted with environmental proxies. Since 2013 he is the director of Avanti!, the online newspaper of the Italian Socialist Party.
