= New Italian Socialist Party =

New Italian Socialist Party Nuovo Partito Socialista Italiano
- Abbreviation: NPSI
- President: Stefano Caldoro
- Secretary: Lucio Barani
- Founded: 19 January 2001; 25 years ago
- Merger of: Socialist League; Socialist Party
- Headquarters: Via Archimede 10, Rome
- Newspaper: È ora
- Youth wing: Movimento Giovani per le Riforme
- Membership (2015): 6,500
- Ideology: Social democracy Liberalism
- Political position: Centre
- National affiliation: Coalition: Centre-right coalition (2008–present); House of Freedoms (2001–2008); Political party: Forza Italia (2013–2015, 2018–2022); The People of Freedom (2008–2013)
- Colors: Red (official); Pink (customary)
- Chamber of Deputies: 1 / 400 (Into Forza Italia)
- Senate: 0 / 200
- European Parliament: 0 / 76
- Regional Councils: 0 / 896

Website
- www.liberalsocialistinpsi.it

The New Italian Socialist Party or New PSI (Italian: Nuovo Partito Socialista Italiano or Nuovo PSI, NPSI), more recently styled as Liberal Socialists – NPSI, is a political party in Italy which professes a social-democratic ideology and claims to be the successor to the historical Italian Socialist Party, which was disbanded after the judiciary tempest of the early 1990s (see Mani pulite).

The party was founded in 2001 as Socialist Party – New PSI (Partito Socialista – Nuovo PSI), during a founding congress in Milan, but after the 2007 split of the Socialist Party, headed by Gianni De Michelis and Mauro Del Bue, it took the current name, under the leadership of Stefano Caldoro. Most of the party's members are former followers of Bettino Craxi, who was convicted for corruption and whom New Socialists often portray as a victim of political persecution. The NPSI has been a member of the centre-right House of Freedoms coalition for most of its history, as the Italian centre-left has been dominated by former communists, the main opponents of the Socialist Party led by Craxi (most of the Craxi's followers had earlier joined Forza Italia). The NPSI defines itself as a "liberal socialist", "reformist" and "anti-communist" party.

The main leader of the party was Gianni De Michelis, who left the party in 2007 and was replaced by Stefano Caldoro. In 2007, several members also left to join the Socialist Party, allied with the centre-left, while what remained of the NPSI was merged into the centre-right PdL. From 2010 to 2015, party leader Caldoro served as President of Campania for the PdL. The party was later affiliated with the new Forza Italia.

== History ==
=== Foundation ===
Logo of the party from 2001 to 2007

The party was founded on 19 January 2001 by the merger of the Socialist Party of Gianni De Michelis, the Socialist League of Bobo Craxi and former members of the Italian Democratic Socialist Party.

=== 2001 general election ===
At its founding congress, the NPSI decided to enter the centre-right House of Freedoms (CdL) coalition led by Silvio Berlusconi (a former friend of Bettino Craxi) as the centre-left was considered too compromised with the Mani pulite investigation, upon which the old Italian Socialist Party was disbanded while the ex Communists were not touched.

The centre-right won the 2001 general election and Berlusconi appointed NPSI's Stefano Caldoro as Deputy Minister for Education in his government. In the election, the NPSI gained just 1.0% of the vote and had three deputies (Craxi, Vincenzo Milioto and Chiara Moroni) and one senator (Franco Crinò) elected in single-seat constituencies. Secretary De Michelis and spokesperson Martelli were not elected since the party failed to pass the 4% threshold.

=== 2004 European Parliament election ===
At the 2004 European Parliament election, the NPSI formed an alliance with small social democratic movements and parties such as Socialist Unity, founded and headed by Claudio Signorile. The list, named United Socialists for Europe, gained 2.0% of the vote and two MEPs, De Michelis and Alessandro Battilocchio. In Calabria, the list gained 7.0%, the highest result ever for the party. The party was denied membership of the Group of the Party of European Socialists and the two NPSI MEPs sat as Non-Inscrits. They eventually joined the Party of European Socialists in October 2007 as members of the newly formed Socialist Party (PS).

At the 2005 regional elections, the NPSI ran its lists as part of the CdL. In Calabria, the party's stronghold, it received 5.4%. However, the CdL lost 12 regions out of 14, forcing Berlusconi to reshuffle cabinet. In the new government, Caldoro was promoted minister.

=== De Michelis vs. Craxi ===
In October 2005, a national congress was held in Rome in order to deliberate the political line to be held by the party, particularly about electoral coalitions. During the congress, which was characterised by a heated atmosphere and several controversies, Craxi, who supported a "unity towards left" within The Union and an immediate retirement from Berlusconi's government, challenged De Michelis, who instead asked the congress to delay the decision.

De Michelis received support from Caldoro, Maroni and Battilocchio whereas Craxi was supported by Milioto, Crinò and Saverio Zavettieri, the powerful Calabrian leader of the party. At some point, De Michelis unrecognised the congress, declaring it had never been officially opened and abandoned it with all of his supporters. The remaining delegates thus elected Craxi secretary. Later, the Tribunal of Rome nullified the congress's outcome.

=== 2006 general election ===
Logo of the joint list with DCA for the 2006 general election

Craxi's faction abandoned the party immediately after the sentence, was re-organised into The Italian Socialists and joined The Union. After winning the legal dispute for the symbol and the leadership of the NPSI, De Michelis led the party into an alliance with Gianfranco Rotondi's Christian Democracy for Autonomies (DCA) at the 2006 general election.

The DCA-NPSI list gained a mere 0.7% of the vote for the Chamber of Deputies and 0.6% for the Senate. It still had six deputies elected because as the list that received more votes under the 2% threshold in its alliance, the CdL. Of these, two were of the NPSI, namely Lucio Barani and Del Bue. Two more candidates were elected as candidates of Forza Italia (Moroni and Giovanni Ricevuto), but they abandoned the party in May, fearing that it was heading out of the centre-right coalition. Nonetheless, the NPSI and its two MPs formed a joint parliamentary group with the DCA comprising six MPs in total, which made it a minimal force in Parliament.

=== Caldoro vs. De Michelis ===
Logo of the party from 2007 to 2023

In June 2007, the NPSI split among those who wanted to participate to the foundation of a joint Socialist Party along with the Italian Democratic Socialists of Enrico Boselli, The Italian Socialists of Bobo Craxi and the Association for the Rose in the Fist of Lanfranco Turci and those who wanted to maintain the allegiance to the House of Freedoms coalition. The first group was led by De Michelis, the latter by Caldoro.

From some time, the NPSI had actually two leaderships, which were elected in two separate congresses. On 24 June, Stefano Caldoro was elected secretary of the right-wing faction of the party while on 7–8 July Del Bue was elected secretary and De Michelis president by those NPSI members who wanted to take part to the foundation of the Socialist Party, whose first meeting took place on 14 July. In practical terms, there were two parties with the same name. After the split, both groups had a member in the Chamber of Deputies, namely Del Bue for the left-wing and Barani for the right-wing (led by Caldoro). Anyway, already on 23 June the two groups had acknowledged the irreconcilability of their political choices and agreed on a consensual separation: the group of Caldoro and Barani would be called Nuovo PSI, while the group of De Michelis and Del Bue would be called Partito Socialista. This second faction, that however continued to act on behalf of the NPSI, joined the Socialist constituent assembly promoted by Enrico Boselli, while the two MEPs elected with the NPSI in 2004, De Michelis and Battilocchio, joined the Socialist Group in the European Parliament. Since that moment, the only NPSI was that led by Caldoro, who announced that its party was interested in joining The People of Freedom (PdL) along with Forza Italia and National Alliance.

=== Events occurred after 2008 ===
At the 2008 general election, the NPSI got two deputies re-elected on the PdL list, namely Caldoro and Barani. In March 2009, the party was merged into the PdL, but it has retained some of its autonomy. In the 2010 Campania regional election, Caldoro was elected president by a landslide. Following his election, Caldoro was replaced as secretary by Barani. Caldoro was then elected president of the party.

In 2013, the NPSI joined Forza Italia (FI), the new party born from the PdL's ashes.

In 2015, Barani stepped down from secretary after having joined the Liberal Popular Alliance, formed by FI dissidents who wanted to explicitly support Matteo Renzi's centre-left government. Following Barani's move, the party appointed Antonio Fasolino as coordinator, chose to cut its official ties with FI and launched the so-called "dual membership". Under this system, any NPSI member can contextually join another party, such as FI or the PSI. Caldoro remained with FI.

In the 2018 general election, Battilocchio was elected to the Chamber from the single-seat constituency of Civitavecchia with the support of the centre-right coalition. After his election, Battilocchio, who was also a member of FI, joined FI's parliamentary group. Subsequently, in 2019, Barani was re-appointed secretary of the party.

In the 2022 general election, Battilocchio was re-elected to the Chamber of Deputies, while Caldoro failed to be elected to the Senate. Following this and Caldoro's exclusion from the Meloni government, the NPSI broke its alignment with FI, while continuing to support the government. In July 2023, the NPSI formed an agreement with the Union of the Centre and Green is Popular / Christian Democracy with Rotondi in the Regional Council of Campania.

== Electoral results ==
=== Italian Parliament ===
Election	Leader	Chamber of Deputies				Senate of the Republic			
Election	Leader	Votes	%	Seats	+/–	Votes	%	Seats	+/–
2001	Gianni De Michelis	353,269	0.93	3 / 630	New	Into CdL		1 / 315	New
2006	Gianni De Michelis	285,474	0.74	4 / 630	▲1	190,724	0.55	0 / 315	▼1
2008	Stefano Caldoro	Into PdL		2 / 630	▼2	Into PdL		0 / 315	0
2013	Stefano Caldoro	Into PdL		0 / 630	▼2	Into PdL		1 / 315	▲1
2018	Stefano Caldoro	Into FI (Note: Alessandro Battilocchio was an individual candidate of Forza Italia within the centre-right coalition and was elected from the single-seat constituency of Civitavecchia.)		1 / 630	▲1	Into FI		0 / 315	▼1
2022	Stefano Caldoro	Into FI		1 / 400	0	Into FI		0 / 200	0

=== European Parliament ===
Election	Leader	Votes	%	Seats	+/–	EP Group
2004 (Note: Into United Socialists for Europe, including also Socialist Unity.)	Gianni De Michelis	664,463 (11th)	2.04	2 / 78	New	NI (2004-2007); PES (2007-2009)
2009	Did not contest			0 / 72	▼2	–
2014	Did not contest			0 / 73	0	–
2019	Did not contest			0 / 76	0	–
2024	Stefano Caldoro	Into FdI		0 / 76	0	–

== Leadership ==
- President: Bobo Craxi (2001–2002), Vincenzo Milioto (2002–2005), Francesco Pizzo (2005–2007), Roberto Scheda (2007–2009), Stefano Caldoro (2011–present)
- Secretary: Gianni De Michelis (2001–2007), Stefano Caldoro (2007–2011), Lucio Barani (2011–2015; 2019–present)
  - Deputy Secretary: Bobo Craxi (2002–2005), Mauro Del Bue (2003–2006), Chiara Moroni (2005–2006), Alessandro Battilocchio (2006–2007), Francesco Pizzo (2006–2007), Franco Spedale (2007–2010), Franco Caruso (2007–2011), Adolfo Collice (2007–2011), Francesco Pizzo (2010–2015), Laura Schianchi (2011–2015), Michele Simone (2021–present)
  - Coordinator: Stefano Caldoro (2006–2007), Antonino Di Trapani (2007–2015), Guido Marone (2015–2021), Alessandro Battilocchio (2015–2021), Antonio Fasolino (2015–2021)
  - Spokesman: Claudio Martelli (2001–2002), Bobo Craxi (2002–2005), Chiara Moroni (2005–2006), Mauro Del Bue (2006–2007)
- Treasurer: Lucio Barani (2007–2011), Massimo Lo Faro (2011–2021)
