= Pia Locatelli =

Italian politician

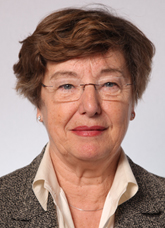
Pia Elda Locatelli

Pia Elda Locatelli (born 13 August 1949 in Villa d'Almè, Bergamo) is an Italian politician and Member of the European Parliament for North-West with the Italian Socialist Democrats, part of the Socialist Group and sits on the European Parliament's Committee on Industry, Research and Energy and its Committee on Women's Rights and Gender Equality.

She serves as a substitute for the Committee on Employment and Social Affairs and a member of the Delegation for Relations with Iran.

From 2008 to 2010, she served as the President of the Italian Socialist Party. In the 2013 Italian general election, she was elected in the Chamber of Deputies with the Democratic Party, representing the PSI.

== Education ==
- Graduated in languages (1973) and economics (1990)

== Career ==
- 1973-1982: Teacher of English language and literature
- 1992-2001: Businesswoman
- National coordinator for women (since 1994) and member of the national executive (since 2000) of the SDI
- Vice-Chairman (1992-1999) and then Chairman (since 2004) of the Socialist International Women
- since 2004: Vice-chairman of the Socialist International
- 1980-1995: Municipal Councillor
- 1990-1995: Leader of the Socialist Group on the Municipal Council of Bergamo
- 1990-1995: Member of the board of directors of the University of Bergamo
- since 2000: Chairman of the 'A. J. Zaninoni' Foundation

== See also ==
- 2004 European Parliament election in Italy
