= Liberal Popular Alliance =

Italian political party

Liberal Popular Alliance – Autonomies Alleanza Liberalpopolare – Autonomie
- President: Denis Verdini
- Founded: 28 July 2015
- Dissolved: March 2018
- Split from: Forza Italia
- Headquarters: Via Poli, 29 Rome
- Ideology: Liberalism; Autonomism
- Political position: Centre
- Colours: Blue

The Liberal Popular Alliance, whose full name was Liberal Popular Alliance – Autonomies (Italian: Alleanza Liberalpopolare – Autonomie, ALA), was a centrist and liberal political party in Italy. ALA members were known as Verdiniani, from the name of their leader Denis Verdini, who was formerly a long-time member and national coordinator of three successive centre-right parties led by Silvio Berlusconi (Forza Italia, The People of Freedom and again Forza Italia) until July 2015, when he broke with Berlusconi in order to support the government led by Matteo Renzi, leader of the centre-left Democratic Party.

Verdini aimed at launching the "Moderates for Renzi", that would eventually include the other centrist parties supporting the government. After Renzi's resignation as Prime Minister in December 2016 the party lost relevance and after the 2018 general election it was deprived of its parliamentary representation.

== History ==
The Liberal Popular Alliance emerged in July 2015 from a split from Forza Italia (FI), led by Denis Verdini, who wanted to support the reforms put forward by the Renzi Cabinet, and was joined by senators coming from different centre-right groups, including Great Autonomies and Freedom (GAL), Conservatives and Reformists (CoR) and New Centre-Right (NCD). Lucio Barani, who until then was the secretary of the New Italian Socialist Party (NPSI), was elected president of the senatorial group. "Autonomies" was possibly added to "Liberal Popular Alliance" because of the presence of two senators of the Movement for the Autonomies–Party of Sicilians (MpA–PdS) in the group. Other than Barani, who continued to be a member of the NPSI, and the two MpA senators, the group included non-party independents.

Between September and October 2015, four senators and seven deputies left FI and joined Verdini; the deputies formed a joint sub-group with the Associative Movement Italians Abroad (MAIE) named "Liberal Popular Alliance – Autonomies – MAIE. Between December and January 2016, the party was joined by five more senators, including Sandro Bondi, another former FI national coordinator. Also in January, three ALA members were elected deputy chairpersons of three Senate committees. A twentieth senator and an eight deputy joined in May. However, Bondi left as early as in June. In April 2016 the presence of two senators of the MpA, who had broken ties with FI while joining the ALA as direct members, was marked by a new name of the group in the Senate: "Liberal Popular Alliance – Autonomies (Movement for the Autonomies)".

The ALA fielded some lists for the 2016 local elections, especially in the South and usually in support of candidates of the Democratic Party (PD). In Naples, the largest city in which the party was present, the ALA obtained a mere 1.4% of the vote.

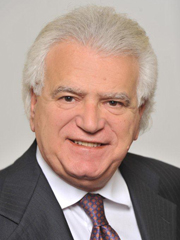
Denis Verdini

Between July and December 2016, the party formed joint groups with Civic Choice (SC), which were renamed "ALA – Civic Choice for the Liberal and Popular Constituent Assembly", and attracted two intellectual leaders from the liberal wing of the old FI: Marcello Pera, a former President of the Senate, and Giuliano Urbani, a former minister of Culture in Berlusconi II Cabinet.

The ALA, SC, Pera and Urbani campaigned heavily for the "Yes" in the 2016 constitutional referendum, which resulted in a defeat for the "Yes" camp and the subsequent resignation of Renzi. The ALA did not join and support the new government led by Paolo Gentiloni.

In February 2017 two senators left and joined Union of the Centre (UDC), in April one deputy joined Popular Alternative (AP), successor of the NCD, in June two senators re-joined FI, and in July another deputy joined AP. In November the party was further reduced to 4 deputies and 12 senators as the two deputies associated with Cantiere Popolare (CP) and the two senators of the MpA left (the CP and the MpA had participated together in the 2017 Sicilian regional election).

In January 2018 the party formed an alliance with the Italian Republican Party (PRI), of which Verdini had been a member until 1994. Under the ALA–PRI alliance, ALA's senatorial group was renamed "Liberal Popular Alliance – Italian Republican Party". In the 2018 general election the list, which actually included only Republican candidates, obtained a mere 0.1% of the vote. Verdini himself did not vote for the list, but voted FI for the Chamber and the PD for the Senate. The party has since become inactive.

== Electoral results ==
=== Italian Parliament ===
Election	Leader	Chamber of Deputies				Senate of the Republic			
Election	Leader	Votes	%	Seats	Position	Votes	%	Seats	Position
2018	Denis Verdini	20,943 (Note: In a joint list with the Italian Republican Party.)	0.06	0 / 630	20th	27,384	0.09	0 / 315	19th
