= United Socialists for Europe =

United Socialists for Europe (Italian: Socialisti Uniti per l'Europa) was an electoral list for the 2004 European Parliament election composed of the New Italian Socialist Party (NPSI) of Gianni De Michelis and Socialist Unity (US) of Claudio Signorile.

The list gained 665,771 votes (2.0%), electing two MEPs, Gianni De Michelis and Alessandro Battilocchio. In Calabria the list gained 7.0%. In the European Parliament, the two NPSI members did not join any political group, initially sitting as Non-Inscrits before later being admitted to the PES Group in 2007.

After this experience NPSI remained part of the House of Freedoms coalition, while US joined the Italian Democratic Socialists (SDI).
