= Second Berlusconi government =

57th government of the Italian Republic

Berlusconi II Cabinet
- 57th Cabinet of Italy

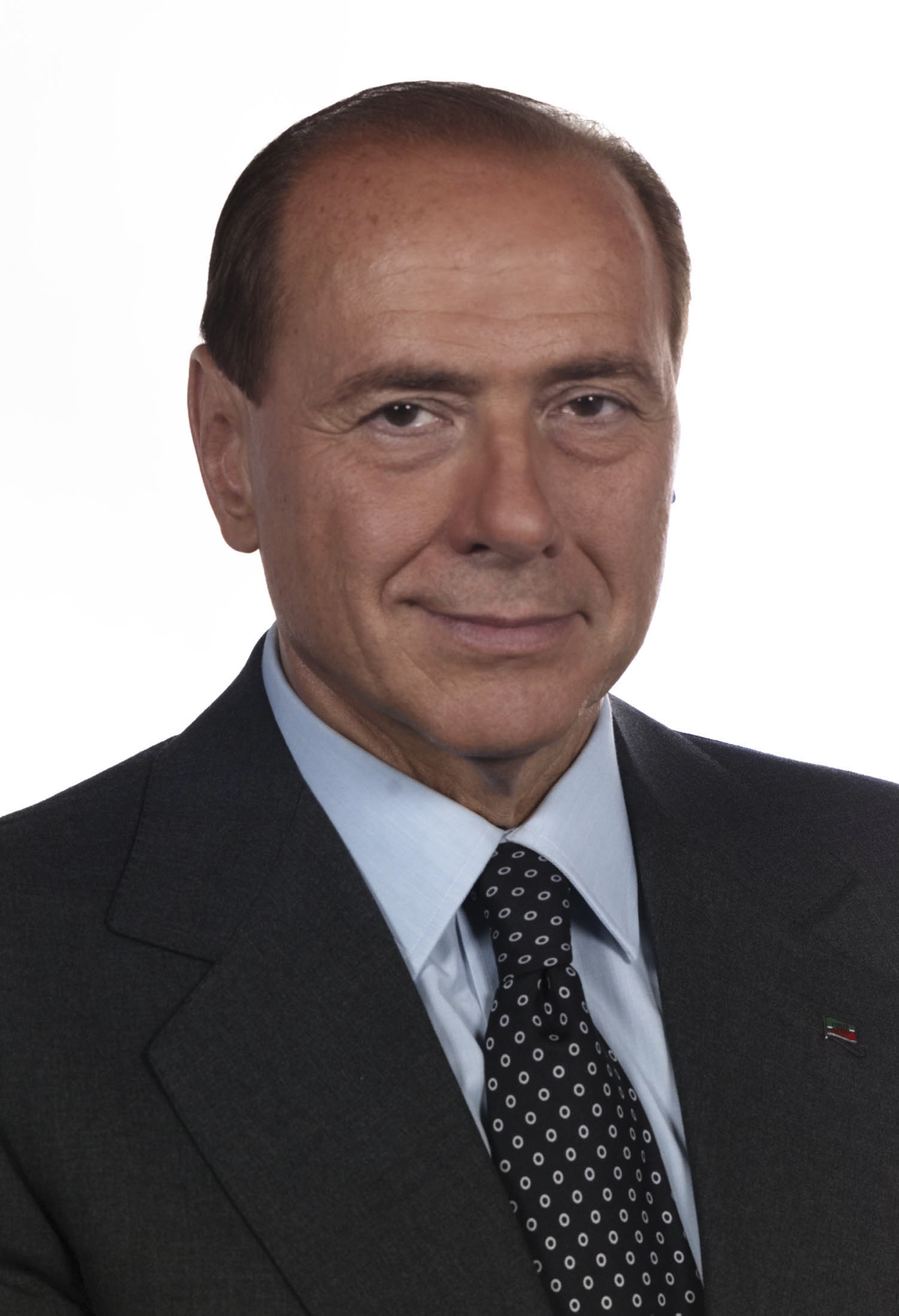
- Date formed: 11 June 2001
- Date dissolved: 23 April 2005 (1,413 days)

People and organisations
- Head of state: Carlo Azeglio Ciampi
- Head of government: Silvio Berlusconi
- No. of ministers: 25 (incl. Prime Minister)
- Ministers removed: 5
- Total no. of members: 30 (incl. Prime Minister)
- Member parties: FI, AN, LN, CCD, CDU
- Status in legislature: Centre-right coalition
- Opposition parties: DS, DL, PRC, UDEUR, SDI, FdV, PdCI

History
- Incoming formation: Berlusconi II Cabinet formation, 2001
- Outgoing formation: Berlusconi III Cabinet formation, 2005
- Election: 2001 election
- Legislature term: XIV Legislature (2001 – 2006)
- Predecessor: Second Amato government
- Successor: Third Berlusconi government

The second Berlusconi government was the 57th government of the Italian Republic and the first government of the XIV Legislature. It took office following the 2001 elections, and held office from 11 June 2001 until 23 April 2005, a total of 1,412 days, or 3 years, 10 months and 12 days. It held office for the second longest period in the history of the Republic, and for the third longest period in the history of unified Italy since 1861 (outlasted only by the Meloni government and the Mussolini government ). During its long tenure, its composition changed significantly. Following the poor performance of the centrist parties in the Italian regional elections of 2005, most of the ministers of the Union of Christian and Centre Democrats and the New PSI resigned from the government, which was succeeded by the third Berlusconi government.

== Formation ==
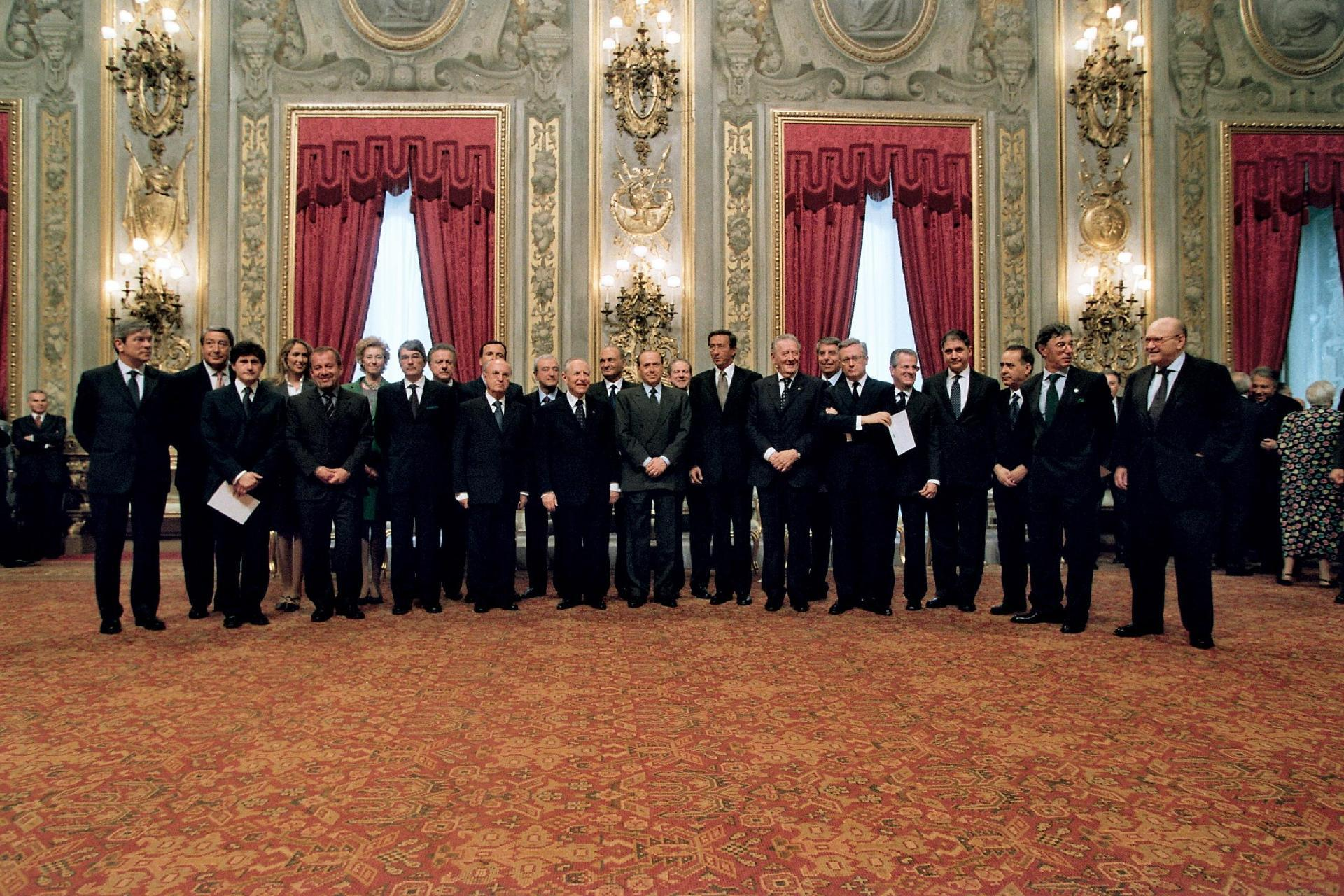
Official photo of the Berlusconi's government after the oath at the Quirinal Palace

In 2001 Berlusconi again ran as leader of the centre-right coalition House of Freedoms (Italian: La Casa delle Libertà), which included the Union of Christian and Centre Democrats, the Northern League, the National Alliance and other minor parties. Berlusconi's success in the May 2001 general election led to him becoming Prime Minister once more, with the coalition receiving 45.4% of the vote for the Chamber of Deputies and 42.5% for the Senate.

On the television interviews programme Porta a Porta, during the last days of the electoral campaign, Berlusconi created a powerful impression on the public by undertaking to sign a so-called Contratto con gli Italiani (English: Contract with the Italians), an idea copied outright by his advisor Luigi Crespi from the Newt Gingrich's Contract with America introduced six weeks before the 1994 US Congressional election, which was widely considered to be a creative masterstroke in his 2001 campaign bid for prime ministership. In this solemn agreement, Berlusconi claimed his commitment on improving several aspects of the Italian economy and life. Firstly, he undertook to simplify the complex tax system by introducing just two tax rates (33% for those earning over 100,000 euros, and 23% for anyone earning less than that figure: anyone earning less than 11,000 euros a year would not be taxed); secondly, he promised to halve the unemployment rate; thirdly, he undertook to finance and develop a massive new public works programme. Fourthly, he promised to raise the minimum monthly pension rate to 516 euros; and fifthly, he would suppress the crime wave by introducing police officers to patrol all local zones and areas in Italy's major cities. Berlusconi undertook to refrain from putting himself up for re-election in 2006 if he failed to honour at least four of these five promises.

The government obtained the confidence of the senate on 20 June 2001 with 175 votes in favour, 133 against and 5 abstentions, and the confidence of the Chamber of Deputies on 21 June 2001 with 351 votes in favour, 261 against and 1 abstention.

The opposition parties claim Berlusconi was not able to achieve the goals he promised in his Contratto con gli Italiani. Some of his partners in government, especially the National Alliance and the Union of Christian and Centre Democrats have admitted the Government fell short of the promises made in the agreement, attributing the failure to an unforeseeable downturn in global economic conditions. Berlusconi himself has consistently asserted that he achieved all the goals of the agreement, and said his Government provided un miracolo continuo (a continuous miracle) that made all 'earlier governments pale' (by comparison). He attributed the widespread failure to recognize these achievements to a campaign of mystification and vilification in the printed media, asserting that 85% of newspapers were opposed to him. Luca Ricolfi, an independent analyst, held that Berlusconi had managed to maintain only one promise out of five, the one concerning minimum pension levels. The other four promises were not, in Luca Ricolfi’s view, honoured. In particular, the undertakings on the tax simplification and the reduction of crime.

== Fall ==
The House of Freedoms did not do as well in the 2003 local elections as it did in the 2001 national elections. In common with many other European governing groups, in the 2004 elections of the European Parliament, gaining 43.37% support. Forza Italia's support was also reduced from 29.5% to 21.0% (in the 1999 European elections Forza Italia had 25.2%). As an outcome of these results the other coalition parties, whose electoral results were more satisfactory, asked Berlusconi and Forza Italia for greater influence in the government's political line.

In the 2005 regional elections (3 April/4 April 2005), the centre-left gubernatorial candidates won in 12 out of 14 regions where control of local governments and governorships was at stake. Berlusconi's coalition kept only two of the regional bodies (Lombardy and Veneto) up for re-election. Three parties, Union of Christian and Centre Democrats, National Alliance and New PSI, threatened to withdraw from the Berlusconi government. The Italian Premier, after some hesitation, then presented to the President of the Republic a request for the dissolution of his government on 20 April 2005.

== Party breakdown ==
=== Beginning of term ===
==== Ministers ====
- Forza Italia
13
- National Alliance
4
- Northern League
3
- Independents
2
- Christian Democratic Centre
1
- United Christian Democrats
1

==== Ministers and other members ====
- Forza Italia (FI): Prime minister, 12 ministers, 29 undersecretaries
- National Alliance (AN): Deputy Prime minister, 4 ministers, 14 undersecretaries
- Northern League (LN): 3 ministers, 6 undersecretaries
- Christian Democratic Centre (CCD): 1 minister, 4 undersecretaries
- United Christian Democrats (CDU): 1 minister, 2 undersecretaries
- Independents: 2 ministers, 2 undersecretaries
- New Italian Socialist Party (NPSI): 1 undersecretary
- Italian Republican Party (PRI): 1 undersecretary

=== End of term ===
==== Ministers ====
- Forza Italia
11
- National Alliance
5
- Union of Christian and Centre Democrats
3
- Northern League
3
- Independents
2

==== Ministers and other members ====
- Forza Italia (FI): Prime minister, 10 ministers, 3 deputy ministers, 31 undersecretaries
- National Alliance (AN): 5 ministers (incl. 1 Deputy Prime minister), 3 deputy ministers, 12 undersecretaries
- Northern League (LN): 3 ministers, 7 undersecretaries
- Union of Christian and Centre Democrats (UDC): 1 Deputy Prime minister, 3 ministers, 1 deputy minister, 6 undersecretaries
- Independents: 2 ministers, 1 undersecretary
- New Italian Socialist Party (NPSI): 1 deputy minister, 1 undersecretary
- Italian Republican Party (PRI): 1 deputy minister

== Composition ==
Portrait	Office	Name	Term	Party	Deputy Ministers Undersecretaries
	Prime Minister	Silvio Berlusconi	11 June 2001 – 23 April 2005	Forza Italia	Undersecretaries: Gianni Letta (Ind.); Paolo Bonaiuti (FI)
	Deputy Prime Minister (Note: Delegated to policies of opposition and recovery to the spread of drug addiction.)	Gianfranco Fini	11 June 2001 – 23 April 2005	National Alliance	Undersecretaries: Gianni Letta (Ind.); Paolo Bonaiuti (FI)
	Deputy Prime Minister	Marco Follini	3 December 2004 – 18 April 2005	Union of Christian and Centre Democrats	Undersecretaries: Gianni Letta (Ind.); Paolo Bonaiuti (FI)
	Minister of Foreign Affairs	Renato Ruggiero	11 June 2001 – 6 January 2002	Independent	Undersecretaries: Roberto Antonione (FI); Margherita Boniver (FI); Alfredo Mantica (AN); Mario Baccini (UDC) (Note: Before 6 December 2002: CCD) (until 2 Dec. 2004); Giampaolo Bettamio (FI) (since 30 Dec. 2004)
	Minister of Foreign Affairs	Silvio Berlusconi (ad interim)	6 January 2002 – 14 November 2002	Forza Italia	Undersecretaries: Roberto Antonione (FI); Margherita Boniver (FI); Alfredo Mantica (AN); Mario Baccini (UDC) (until 2 Dec. 2004); Giampaolo Bettamio (FI) (since 30 Dec. 2004)
	Minister of Foreign Affairs	Franco Frattini	14 November 2002 – 18 November 2004	Forza Italia	Undersecretaries: Roberto Antonione (FI); Margherita Boniver (FI); Alfredo Mantica (AN); Mario Baccini (UDC) (until 2 Dec. 2004); Giampaolo Bettamio (FI) (since 30 Dec. 2004)
	Minister of Foreign Affairs	Gianfranco Fini	18 November 2004 – 23 April 2005	National Alliance	Undersecretaries: Roberto Antonione (FI); Margherita Boniver (FI); Alfredo Mantica (AN); Mario Baccini (UDC) (until 2 Dec. 2004); Giampaolo Bettamio (FI) (since 30 Dec. 2004)
	Minister of the Interior	Claudio Scajola	11 June 2001 – 3 July 2002	Forza Italia	Undersecretaries: Maurizio Balocchi (LN); Antonio D'Alì (FI); Alfredo Mantovano (AN); Carlo Taormina (FI) (until 5 Dec. 2001); Michele Saponara (FI) (since 30 Dec. 2004)
	Minister of the Interior	Giuseppe Pisanu	3 July 2002 – 23 April 2005	Forza Italia	Undersecretaries: Maurizio Balocchi (LN); Antonio D'Alì (FI); Alfredo Mantovano (AN); Carlo Taormina (FI) (until 5 Dec. 2001); Michele Saponara (FI) (since 30 Dec. 2004)
	Minister of Justice	Roberto Castelli	11 June 2001 – 23 April 2005	Northern League	Undersecretaries: Jole Santelli (FI); Giuseppe Valentino (AN); Michele Vietti (UDC); Luigi Vitali (FI) (since 30 Dec. 2004)
	Minister of Economy and Finance	Giulio Tremonti	11 June 2001 – 3 July 2004	Forza Italia	Deputy Ministers: Mario Baldassarri (AN) (since 19 Oct. 2001); Gianfranco Micciché (FI) (since 19 Oct. 2001); Undersecretaries: Maria Teresa Armosino (FI); Manlio Contento (AN); Daniele Molgora (LN); Giuseppe Vegas (FI); Mario Baldassarri (AN) (until 19 Oct. 2001); Gianfranco Micciché (FI) (until 19 Oct. 2001); Vito Tanzi (Ind.) (until 17 July 2003); Gianluigi Magri (UDC) (since 4 Feb. 2003)
	Minister of Economy and Finance	Silvio Berlusconi (ad interim)	3 July 2004 – 16 July 2004	Forza Italia	Deputy Ministers: Mario Baldassarri (AN) (since 19 Oct. 2001); Gianfranco Micciché (FI) (since 19 Oct. 2001); Undersecretaries: Maria Teresa Armosino (FI); Manlio Contento (AN); Daniele Molgora (LN); Giuseppe Vegas (FI); Mario Baldassarri (AN) (until 19 Oct. 2001); Gianfranco Micciché (FI) (until 19 Oct. 2001); Vito Tanzi (Ind.) (until 17 July 2003); Gianluigi Magri (UDC) (since 4 Feb. 2003)
	Minister of Economy and Finance	Domenico Siniscalco	16 July 2004 – 23 April 2005	Independent	Deputy Ministers: Mario Baldassarri (AN) (since 19 Oct. 2001); Gianfranco Micciché (FI) (since 19 Oct. 2001); Undersecretaries: Maria Teresa Armosino (FI); Manlio Contento (AN); Daniele Molgora (LN); Giuseppe Vegas (FI); Mario Baldassarri (AN) (until 19 Oct. 2001); Gianfranco Micciché (FI) (until 19 Oct. 2001); Vito Tanzi (Ind.) (until 17 July 2003); Gianluigi Magri (UDC) (since 4 Feb. 2003)
	Minister of Productive Activities	Antonio Marzano	11 June 2001 – 23 April 2005	Forza Italia	Deputy Ministers: Adolfo Urso (AN) (since 19 Oct. 2001); Undersecretaries: Giovanni Dell'Elce (FI); Giuseppe Galati (UDC); Mario Valducci (FI); Adolfo Urso (AN) (until 19 Oct. 2001); Stefano Stefani (LN) (until 17 July 2003); Roberto Cota (LN) (since 30 Dec. 2004)
	Minister of Education, University and Research	Letizia Moratti	11 June 2001 – 23 April 2005	Forza Italia	Deputy Ministers: Guido Possa (FI) (since 19 Oct. 2001); Stefano Caldoro (NPSI) (since 14 Jan. 2005); Undersecretaries: Valentina Aprea (FI); Maria Grazia Siliquini (AN); Guido Possa (FI) (until 19 Oct. 2001); Stefano Caldoro (NPSI) (since 14 Jan. 2005)
	Minister of Labour and Social Security	Roberto Maroni	11 June 2001 – 23 April 2005	Northern League	Undersecretaries: Alberto Brambilla (LN); Maurizio Sacconi (FI); Grazia Sestini (FI); Pasquale Viespoli (AN); Roberto Rosso (FI) (since 30 Dec. 2004)
	Minister of Defense	Antonio Martino	11 June 2001 – 23 April 2005	Forza Italia	Undersecretaries: Filippo Berselli (AN); Francesco Bosi (UDC); Salvatore Cicu (FI); Giuseppe Drago (UDC) (since 30 Dec. 2004)
	Minister of Agriculture, Food and Forestry Policies	Gianni Alemanno	11 June 2001 – 23 April 2005	National Alliance	Undersecretaries: Teresio Delfino (UDC) (Note: Before 6 December 2002: CDU); Gianpaolo Dozzo (LN); Paolo Scarpa (FI)
	Minister of the Environment	Altero Matteoli	11 June 2001 – 23 April 2005	National Alliance	Deputy Ministers: Francesco Nucara (PRI) (since 30 Dec. 2004); Undersecretaries: Roberto Tortoli (FI); Francesco Nucara (PRI) (until 30 Dec. 2004); Antonio Martusciello (FI) (until 30 Dec. 2004); Stefano Stefani (LN) (since 30 Dec. 2004)
	Minister of Infrastructure and Transport	Pietro Lunardi	11 June 2001 – 23 April 2005	Forza Italia	Deputy Ministers: Ugo Martinat (AN) (since 19 Oct. 2001); Mario Tassone (UDC) (since 19 Oct. 2001); Undersecretaries: Paolo Mammola (FI); Nino Sospiri (AN); Guido Viceconte (FI); Giancarlo Giorgetti (LN) (until 21 June 2001); Ugo Martinat (AN) (until 19 Oct. 2001); Mario Tassone (UDC) (until 19 Oct. 2001); Paolo Uggè (FI) (since 7 March 2003); Silvano Moffa (AN) (since 30 Dec. 2004); Giovanni Ricevuto (NPSI) (since 30 Dec. 2004)
	Minister of Health	Girolamo Sirchia	11 June 2001 – 23 April 2005	Independent	Undersecretaries: Cesare Cursi (AN); Antonio Guidi (FI); Elisabetta Casellati (FI) (since 30 Dec. 2004); Rocco Salini (FI) (since 11 March 2005)
	Minister of Cultural Heritage and Activities	Giuliano Urbani	11 June 2001 – 23 April 2005	Forza Italia	Deputy Ministers: Antonio Martusciello (FI) (since 14 January 2005); Undersecretaries: Nicola Bono (AN); Mario Pescante (FI); Vittorio Sgarbi (FI) (until 25 June 2002)
	Minister of Communications	Maurizio Gasparri	11 June 2001 – 23 April 2005	National Alliance	Undersecretaries: Massimo Baldini (FI); Giancarlo Innocenzi (FI)
	Minister of Regional Affairs (without portfolio)	Enrico La Loggia	11 June 2001 – 23 April 2005	Forza Italia	Undersecretaries: Alberto Gagliardi (FI)
	Minister for the Implementation of the Government Program (without portfolio)	Giuseppe Pisanu	11 June 2001 – 3 July 2002	Forza Italia	
	Minister for the Implementation of the Government Program (without portfolio)	Claudio Scajola	28 August 2003 – 23 April 2005	Forza Italia	
	Minister of Public Function (without portfolio)	Franco Frattini (Note: Delegated to the coordination of the information and security services.)	11 June 2001 – 14 November 2002	Forza Italia	Undersecretaries: Learco Saporito (AN)
	Minister of Public Function (without portfolio)	Luigi Mazzella	14 November 2002 – 3 December 2004	Independent	Undersecretaries: Learco Saporito (AN)
	Minister of Public Function (without portfolio)	Mario Baccini	3 December 2004 – 23 April 2005	Union of Christian and Centre Democrats	Undersecretaries: Learco Saporito (AN)
	Minister for Innovation and Technologies (without portfolio)	Lucio Stanca	11 June 2001 – 23 April 2005	Forza Italia	
	Minister of Italians in the World (without portfolio)	Mirko Tremaglia	11 June 2001 – 23 April 2005	National Alliance	
	Minister for Equal Opportunities (without portfolio)	Stefania Prestigiacomo	11 June 2001 – 23 April 2005	Forza Italia	
	Minister of Community Affairs (without portfolio)	Rocco Buttiglione	11 June 2001 – 23 April 2005	Union of Christian and Centre Democrats before 6 December 2002: United Christian Democrats	
	Minister for Institutional Reforms and Devolution (without portfolio)	Umberto Bossi	11 June 2001 – 16 July 2004	Northern League	Undersecretaries: Aldo Brancher (FI); Gian Paolo Gobbo (LN) (since 30 Dec. 2004)
	Minister for Institutional Reforms and Devolution (without portfolio)	Roberto Calderoli	16 July 2004 – 23 April 2005	Northern League	Undersecretaries: Aldo Brancher (FI); Gian Paolo Gobbo (LN) (since 30 Dec. 2004)
	Minister for Parliamentary Relations (without portfolio)	Carlo Giovanardi	11 June 2001 – 23 April 2005	Union of Christian and Centre Democrats before 6 December 2002: Christian Democratic Centre	Undersecretaries: Cosimo Ventucci (FI)
