= Alessandro Battilocchio =

Italian politician

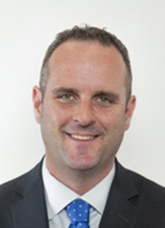

Personal details
- Born: 3 May 1977 (age 49) Rome, Italy
- Party: NPSI (2001–2007); PSI (2007–2009); NPSI (2010–present); FI (2014–present)
- Education: Luiss Guido Carli; Sapienza University of Rome
- Profession: Politician

Alessandro Battilocchio (born 3 May 1977 in Rome) is an Italian politician.

== Biography ==
Battilocchio graduated in law from the LUISS Guido Carli and then in political science from La Sapienza University in Rome.

He served as Councilor for culture and youth policies at Tolfa in 1997. In 2001, at the age of 24, Battilocchio was elected mayor of Tolfa and remained in office until 2011.

In the European Parliament election of 2004 he was elected with the United Socialists for Europe and joined the EP group of Non-Inscrits. He was member of the Committee on Development and of the Committee on Petitions. He was a substitute for the Committee on Transport and Tourism, and a member of the delegation to the EU-Romania Joint Parliamentary Committee.

In 2007 he participated in the Socialist constituent assembly along with De Michelis and Del Bue. In the European Parliament election of 2009 he was candidate with Left and Freedom, but he was not re-elected. Subsequently, he left the Socialist Party (PSI) and re-joined the New Italian Socialist Party (NPSI).

In the European Parliament election of 2014 he was a candidate among the ranks of Forza Italia, but even on this occasion he was not elected. In the 2018 Italian general election he was elected Deputy in the uninominal constituency of Civitavecchia.
