= Chiara Moroni =

Italian politician (born 1974)

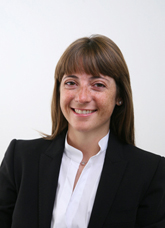

Member of the Chamber of Deputies
- In office 30 May 2001 – 14 March 2013
- Constituency: Rezzato (2001–2006); Lombardy 3 (2006–2013)

Personal details
- Born: 23 October 1974 (age 51) Iseo, Italy
- Party: New PSI (2001–2010); FI (2006–2009); PdL (2009–2010); FLI (2010–2013)
- Education: University of Parma
- Profession: Politician, pharmacist

Chiara Moroni (born 23 October 1974 in Iseo) is an Italian politician, daughter of Sergio Moroni, a Socialist politician who killed himself during Tangentopoli.

Chiara Moroni was elected deputy in the 2001 general election for the constituency of Rezzato under the banner of the New Italian Socialist Party, at the age of 26. When Gianni De Michelis and Bobo Craxi disputed on the collocation of the party in 2005, she supported De Michelis and his line of continuing the alliance with Silvio Berlusconi's House of Freedoms coalition.

She was re-elected deputy in 2006 and 2008 into the Forza Italia and People of Freedom lists. On 4 August 2010 she left the PdL to join Future and Freedom, the new party of Gianfranco Fini. She was again candidate in the 2013 Italian general election into the Future and Freedom list, but she was not re-elected due to the failure to reach the quorum by the party.
