= Ugo Martinat =

Italian politician, member of National Alliance

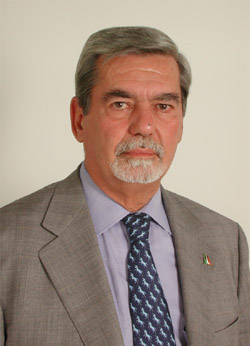

Member of the Chamber of Deputies
- In office 20 June 1979 – 27 April 2006

Member of the Senate
- In office 27 April 2006 – 28 March 2009

Personal details
- Born: 28 April 1942 Settimo Torinese, Italy
- Died: 28 March 2009 (aged 66) Rome, Italy
- Cause of death: Lung cancer
- Party: MSI (until 1995); AN (1995-2009)
- Occupation: Politician

Ugo Martinat (28 April 1942 – 28 March 2009) was an Italian politician, and member of National Alliance.

== Biography ==
Martinat began his political career in the Italian Social Movement, holding positions both in the youth formations and in the Youth Front Secretariat and has been, during the 1970s, the organizer of the security services for Giorgio Almirante's meetings.

In 1973, Martinat was elected to the central committee of the party and in 1979 he became a member of the national leadership after being appointed provincial secretary of the MSI of Turin.

Martinat has been uninterruptedly elected at the Chamber of Deputies from 1979 to 2001, first on the lists of the MSI, then in those of the National Alliance, of which he was a member of the national political office, and has been elected at the Senate in 2006 and 2008. He has been the enforcer of Giorgio Almirante and Gianfranco Fini in Piedmont and the reference man of the MSI in that region for over 30 years.

In 1993, Martinat ran unsuccessfully for the office of Mayor of Turin.

In 2001 he was appointed Deputy Minister of Infrastructures and Transports, working side by side with Minister Pietro Lunardi, in the Berlusconi II Cabinet and the following Berlusconi III Cabinet. In this role, he dealt, among other things, with the great works related to the preparation of the Turin 2006 Winter Olympics. Another theme that Martinat was interested in was the construction of the high-speed railway line between Turin and Lyon.

In 2008, Martinat was appointed Undersecretary for Economic Development in the Berlusconi IV Cabinet and held that position until his death on 28 March 2009, at the age of 66, losing his battle against lung cancer. He died one day after the birth of The People of Freedom, in which Forza Italia and AN have converged.
