= Stefano Stefani =

Italian politician (1938–2024)

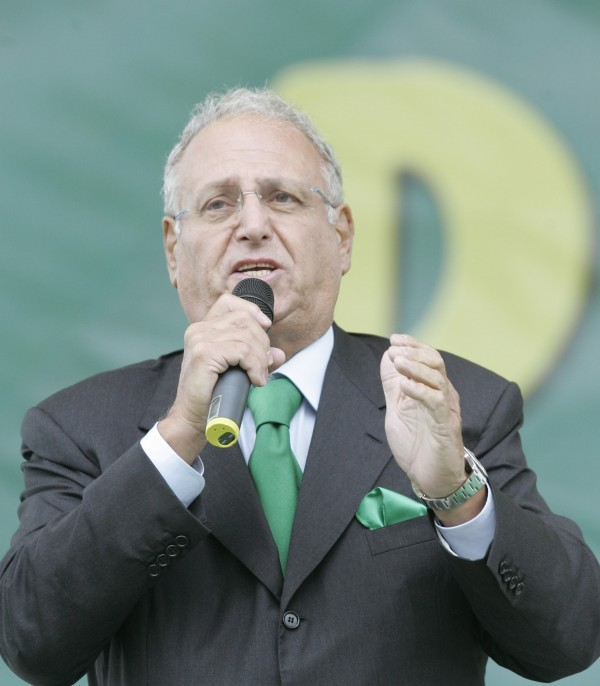
Stefano Stefani

Stefano Stefani (29 September 1938 – 30 April 2024) was an Italian politician and leading member of the regional secessionist Liga Veneta–Lega Nord.

== Background ==
Stefani was a veteran member of the party, having joined Liga Veneta in the 1980s, well before its merger into Lega Nord. A strong proponent of the unity of the "Padanian peoples", from 1995 through 2002 he was federal president of Lega Nord. A member of the Italian Parliament from 1994, Stefani was the chairman of the Foreign Affairs Committee of the Italian Chamber of Deputies. Between 2001 and 2003 he served as undersecretary of Productive Activities in Berlusconi II Cabinet, while he was undersecretary of the Environment in Berlusconi II and III Cabinets from 2004 through 2006. Stefani died in Costabissara on 30 April 2024, at the age of 85.
