= Socialists and Democrats (Italy) =

Socialists and Democrats Socialisti e Democratici
- Leaders: Marco Di Lello; Lello Di Gioia; Giuseppe Lauricella
- Split from: Italian Socialist Party
- Ideology: Social democracy
- Political position: Centre-left

Socialists and Democrats (Italian: Socialisti e Democratici, S&D) is a social-democratic faction of the Democratic Party (PD), a centre-left political party in Italy.

The faction was formed on 26 November 2015 as a split from the Italian Socialist Party (PSI) led by Marco Di Lello (who had been the party leader in the Chamber of Deputies until then), Lello Di Gioia (a long-time member of the PSI) and Giuseppe Lauricella (a former Socialist who had been elected with the PD in 2013). The faction includes also Rapisardo Antinucci, a former member of the Chamber, and Marco Gianfranceschi, president of "Giuseppe Saragat" Foundation.

== Leadership ==
- President: Fabio Guerriero
- Coordinator: Claudia Bastianelli
  - Deputy Coordinator: Roberto Nativi
- Organisational Secretary: Vincenzo Scognamiglio
