= Paolo Bonaiuti =

Italian politician and journalist (1940–2019)

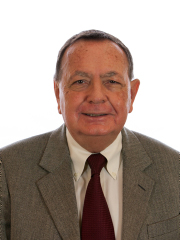
- Bonaiuti in 2013

Member of the Senate
- In office 15 March 2013 – 22 March 2018

Member of the Chamber of Deputies
- In office 9 May 1996 – 14 March 2013

Personal details
- Born: 7 July 1940 Florence, Italy
- Died: 16 October 2019 (aged 79) Rome
- Party: Forza Italia (1996–2009); The People of Freedom (2009–2013); Forza Italia (2013–2014); New Centre-Right (2014–2017); Popular Alternative (2017–2019)
- Profession: Politician, journalist

Paolo Bonaiuti (7 July 1940 – 16 October 2019) was an Italian politician and journalist.

== Biography ==
Born in Florence, Bonaiuti graduated in law. He was English teacher and worked as a copywriter in the field of advertising. He was also head of the economic service of the newspaper Il Giorno and since 1975 he was a special correspondent, first for economics and finance, then for international political events. In 1984 he entered Il Messaggero as an envoy and as a columnist, following above all the G7 summits, the war events and investigations of the Europe's changes. In 1992 he became deputy director of the newspaper. He has also collaborated with the BBC, with the RSI and with other foreign media.

In 1996 Bonaiuti joined Forza Italia and was elected Deputy. Re-elected in 2001, he served as Undersecretary of State in the second and in the third Berlusconi government.

From 2008 to 2011 he served as spokesman of the fourth Berlusconi government.

After four legislatures as Deputy, in 2013 Bonaiuti was elected Senator with The People of Freedom. In November 2013 he joined the reborn Forza Italia, but on 21 April 2014 he left it to join the New Centre-Right led by Angelino Alfano.
