= Francesco Nucara =

Italian politician (1940–2022)

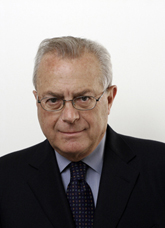
- Nucara in 2008

Member of the Chamber of Deputies
- In office 12 July 1983 – 14 April 1994
- In office 28 April 2006 – 14 March 2013
- Constituency: Calabria

Personal details
- Born: 3 April 1940 Reggio Calabria, Italy
- Died: 12 May 2022 (aged 82) Rome, Italy
- Party: PRI (1963–2022)
- Profession: Politician, journalist

Francesco Nucara (3 April 1940 – 12 May 2022) was an Italian politician.

== Biography ==
Francesco Nucara was born in Reggio Calabria, and graduated in statistics and actuarial science and architecture.

He was elected in the Chamber of Deputies for the first time in the 1983 general election, into the list of the Republican Party. In 1989 he was appointed Undersecretary of State for Public Works in the Andreotti VI Cabinet.

In 2001 he was appointed National Secretary of the PRI. Under his leadership the PRI has strengthened the alliance with the House of Freedom led by Silvio Berlusconi. In the same year he was appointed Deputy Minister of Environment in the Berlusconi II Cabinet.

In the 2006 general election he was elected at the Chamber of Deputies with Forza Italia and in the 2008 general election he was re-elected with The People of Freedom.
