= Alberto Benzoni =

Italian politician (1935–2026)

- Born: 29 March 1935; Bad Bentheim, Gau Weser-Ems, Germany
- Died: 11 January 2026 (aged 90)
- Occupations: Journalist, historian, politician
- Political party: Italian Socialist Party; Labour Federation; Italian Democratic Socialists

Alberto Benzoni (29 March 1935 – 11 January 2026) was an Italian politician.

== Life and career ==
=== Political career ===
Benzoni joined the Italian Socialist Party in 1957, was elected city councilor of Rome in 1971 and was re-elected in 1976 and 1981. In 1976, he joined the left-wing government led by the Independent Left as a Deputy Mayor elected on the Italian Communist Party's list under Giulio Carlo Argan and in the subsequent Petroselli government. After the 1981 local elections, he was replaced by Pierluigi Severi, who at the time was close to the Craxian wing of the Italian Socialist Party.

A member of the Lombard left Riccardo Lombardi, in 1978 Benzoni along with Michele Achilli, Gianfranco Amendola, Tristano Codignola, Paolo Leon and Marcello Vittorini co-authored an article in Avanti! that was critical of party secretary Bettino Craxi because of his anti-communist politics and the ideological changes he promoted.

In 1994, he joined the Labour Federation, of which he was a member until the majority of that group merged with the Democrats of the Left, which he opposed. Benzoni then promoted the Socialist and Labor Unity Movement, which participated in the founding of the Italian Democratic Socialists in May 1998.

In 2006, he supported the Rose in the Fist project.

On 1–2 June 2019, during the 1st National Congress of Risorgimento Socialista, he was unanimously elected President of the party. He continued to play an active role in the party's activities, presiding over the Festa Nazionale di Risorgimento Socialista in Rome in December 2025.

=== Writer and journalist ===
Benzoni authored several publications on the history of socialism and the Italian Socialist Party. In 1991, before the demise of the Craxian era sparked by the Clean Hands investigations, he published the essay "Craxism," on the figure and politics of Bettino Craxi. Together with his daughter Elisa, a graduate in contemporary history, in 1999 he published "Attentato e rappresaglia," an essay on the Via Rasella attack.

He wrote international politics columns for Avanti! and Mondoperaio.

=== Death ===
Benzoni died on 11 January 2026, at the age of 90.

== Works ==
- Edizioni di Comunità (1967). "The Socialists and Foreign Policy". The Foreign Policy of the Italian Republic. edited by Massimo Bonanni. Milan.
- (with Viva Tedesco) Marsilio (1968). The Socialist Movement in the Postwar Period. Venice.
- Marsilio (1980). The Socialist Party from the Resistance to date. Venice.
- Governing Rome. On the Side of the Socialists, by Antonio Manca, Rome, Edimez, 1981 - interview
- Edizioni Associate (1991). Craxism. Rome. ISBN 88-267-0047-8.
- (with Luca Cefisi, introduction by Stefano Silvestri) Edizioni Associate (1995). Pacifism. Stories of Ideas and Movements Against War. Rome.
- (with Roberto Gritti) Edizioni Lavoro (1995). No Man's Land. In Search of the Lost Republic. with a preface by Walter Veltroni. Rome. ISBN 88-7910-642-2.
- (with Elisa Benzoni) Marsilio (1999). Attack and Reprisal. The PCI and Via Rasella. Venice. ISBN 88-317-7169-8.
- Piero Lacaita Editore (2010). "Salvemini and the Left in Italy". Gaetano Salvemini (1873-1957). edited by Guido Pescosolido. Manduria. ISBN 978-88-6582-002-5.
- (with Elisa Benzoni) The Ways of Italy, Brescia, Bietti, 2009.
- (with Elisa Benzoni) Marsilio (2013). History with the ifs. Ten Cases That Could Have Changed the Course of the Twentieth Century. with contributions by Luciano Cafagna, Mario Del Pero, Ernesto Galli della Loggia, Andrea Graziosi, Paolo Mieli, Gian Enrico Rusconi, Giovanni Sabbatucci, Claudio Strinati, and Massimo Teodori. Venice. ISBN 88-317-1426-0.
