= Michela Marzano =

Italian politician and writer

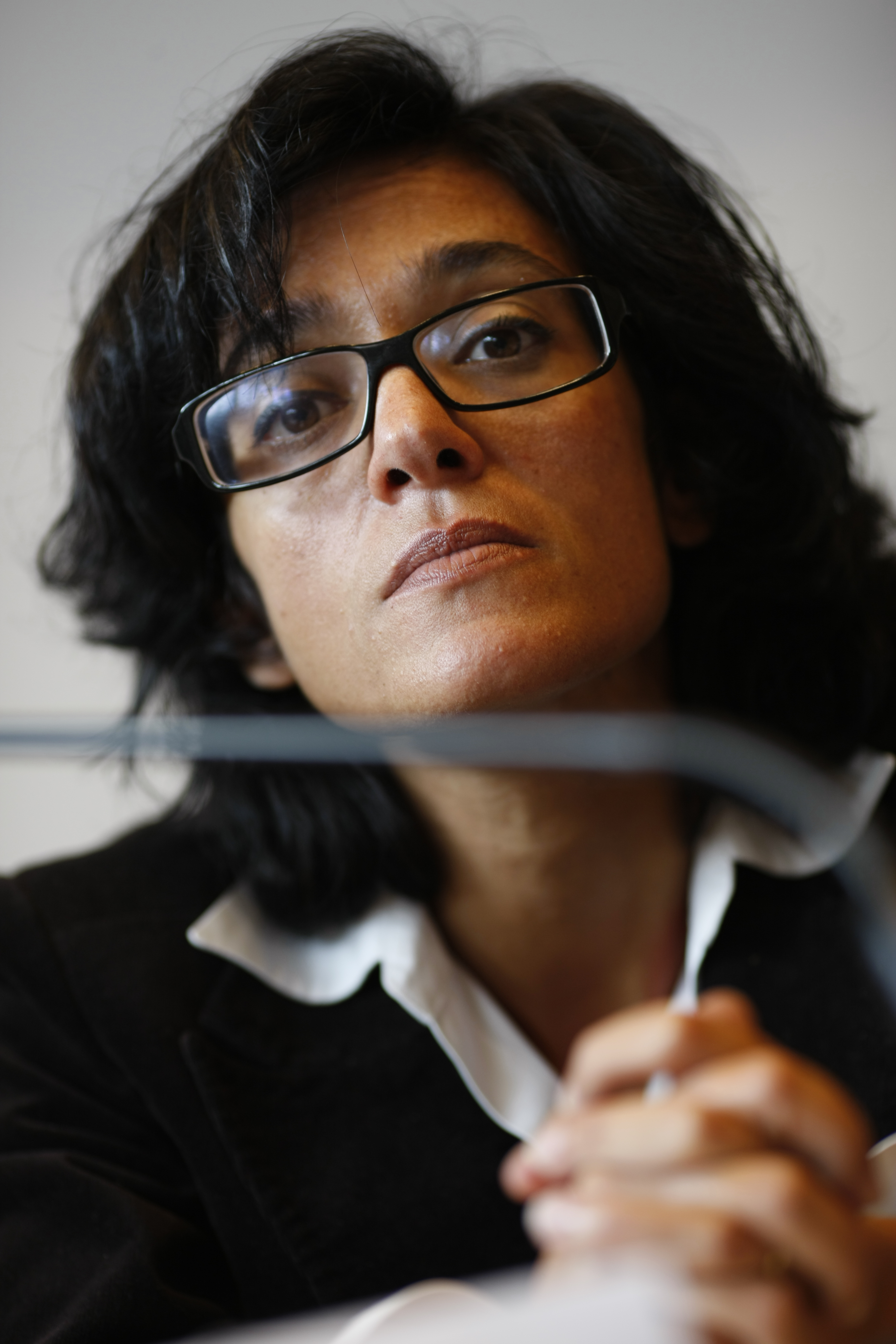
Michela Marzano

Maria Michela Marzano (born 20 August 1970) is an Italian researcher, philosopher and writer. Politically connected to the Italian left, she was elected a Member of the Italian Parliament for the Democratic Party in February 2013.

== Biography ==
Michela Marzano was born in Rome in 1970. She studied philosophy at the Scuola Normale Superiore di Pisa and specialized in analytical philosophy and Bioethics at Sapienza University of Roma.

In 1998, she defended her thesis at the Scuola Normale Superiore on the status of the human body, which led her to follow continuing discourse on the topic. Marzano traveled to France in 1999 and enrolled at the French National Center for Scientific Research in 2000. In 2010, Marzano became a professor of philosophy at Paris Descartes University.

Marzano's specialty is in ethics and political philosophy, and focuses primarily on the space that human beings occupy today, especially as Carnal beings. Her analysis looks at human fragility. Politically, Marzano criticizes European liberalism and the myth of self-confidence. Marzano has written editorial pieces in La Repubblica on debates between Italy and France.

In her book, Légère comme un papillon ("Light Like a Butterfly"), Marzano revealed the role that anorexia had played in her life.

== Political career ==
In the 2013 Italian general election, Marzano stood as a Democratic Party candidate in Milan and was elected a member of the Chamber of Deputies and was able to join the government coalition of Pier Luigi Bersani. She was appointed to the Justice Committee and on the Parliamentary Commission for Children and Adolescents. On 4 May 2015, she voted against the Italian electoral law of 2015, which was proposed by the government. In 2016, Marzano left the Democratic Party when the government proposal on civil unions did not provide the possibility for same-sex couples to adopt children. She joined the Mixed Group but continued to support the government coalition.

== Publications ==
- Penser le corps, PUF, 2002 ISBN 2130506836
- La pornographie ou L'épuisement du désir, Buchet-Chastel, 2003 ISBN 2283019354
- La fidélité ou L'amour à vif, Buchet-Chastel, 2005 ISBN 2283020603
- Alice au pays du porno (avec Claude Rozier), Ramsay, 2005 ISBN 2841147037
- Le corps : films X : y jouer ou y être, entretien avec Ovidie, Autrement, 2005 ISBN 2746706547
- Malaise dans la sexualité, JC Lattès, 2006 ISBN 2709628147
- Je consens, donc je suis... : éthique de l’autonomie, PUF, 2006 ISBN 2130556515
- Philosophie du corps, PUF, 2007 ISBN 9782130555063
- Dictionnaire du corps, PUF, 2007 ISBN 2130550584
- L'éthique appliquée, Paris, PUF, coll. « Que sais-je ? », 2010
- Extension du domaine de la manipulation : de l'entreprise à la vie privée, Grasset, 2008 ISBN 9782246733713
- Le fascisme : un encombrant retour ?, Paris, Larousse, coll. « Philosopher », 2009.
- Le contrat de défiance, Grasset, 2010. publié ensuite chez Pluriel en mai 2012 sous le titre Éloge de la confiance ISBN 9782818502181
- Légère comme un papillon (in French). Paris: Grasset. 2012. p. 352. ISBN 978-2-246-79439-4.
- Tout ce que je sais de l'amour (in French). Paris: Stock. 2014. p. 216. ISBN 978-2-234-07723-2.
- Papa, maman, le genre et moi (in French). Paris: Albin Michel. 2017. p. 216. ISBN 978-2-226-39795-9.
