= Socialist League (Italy) =

Political party

Socialist League Lega Socialista
- President: Bobo Craxi
- Founded: 10 May 2000
- Dissolved: 20 January 2001
- Split from: Italian Democratic Socialists
- Merged into: New PSI
- Ideology: Social democracy
- Political position: Centre

The Socialist League (Italian: Lega Socialista, LS) was a tiny social-democratic party in Italy, founded by Bobo Craxi on 10 May 2000.

The Socialist League was already operating as a faction within the Italian Democratic Socialists (SDI), of which the LS was a founding member in 1998. A year later, Craxi was an unsuccessful SDI candidate in the 1999 European Parliament election, while Claudio Martelli was elected and later appointed SDI deputy leader.

In June 2000 both Craxi and Martelli left the SDI. In January 2001 the LS was merged with the Socialist Party to form the New Italian Socialist Party, allied with the centre-right coalition. Craxi was elected president of the new party, while Martelli was nominated spokesperson. Martelli left politics in 2004, while Craxi led a split from the NPSI in 2006 and launched The Italian Socialists, which was a founding component of the revived Italian Socialist Party in 2007.
