= Stefano Caldoro =

Italian politician

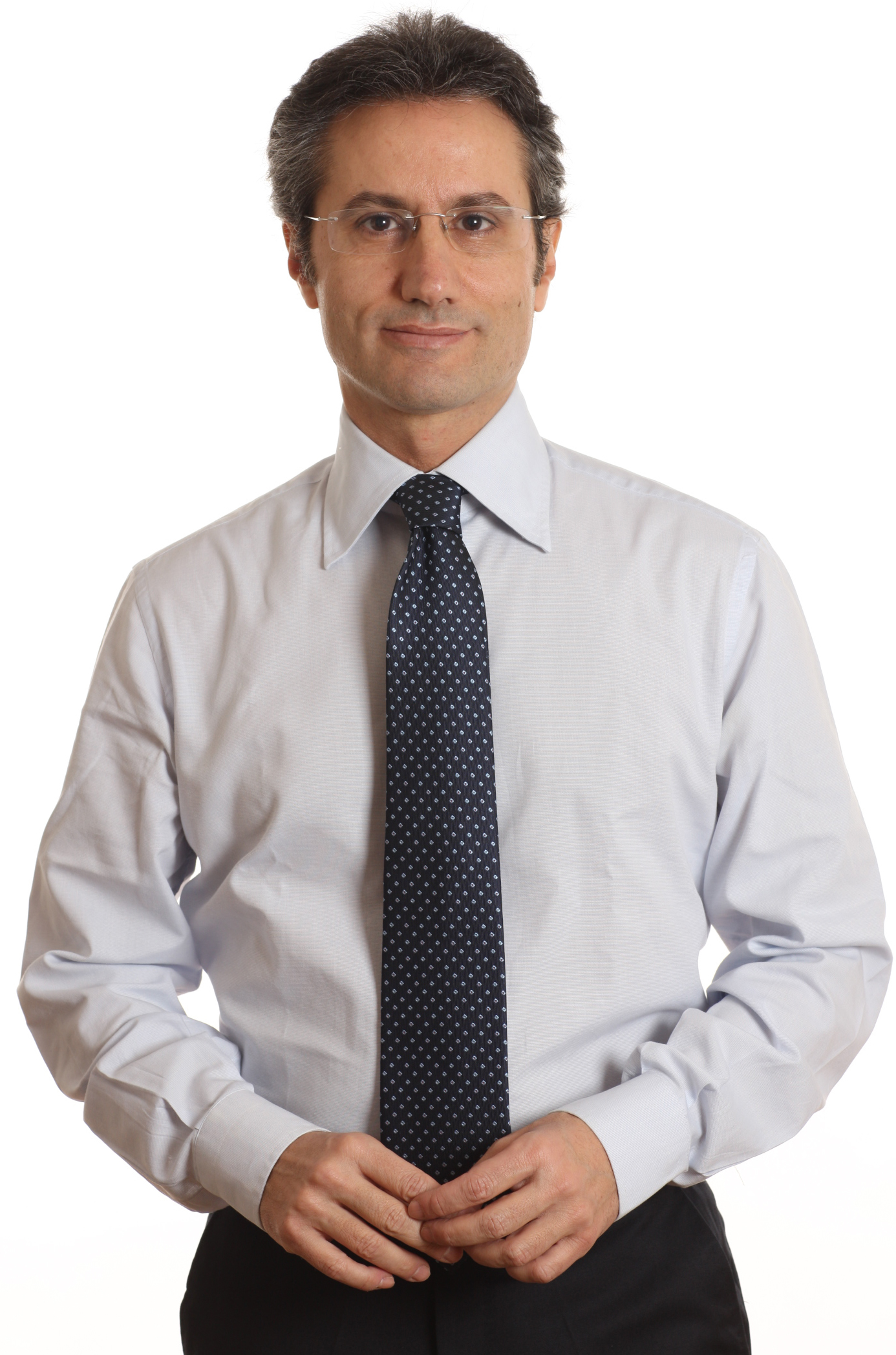

President of Campania
- In office 17 April 2010 – 18 June 2015
- Preceded by: Antonio Bassolino
- Succeeded by: Vincenzo De Luca

Minister for the Implementation of the Government Program
- In office 23 April 2005 – 17 May 2006
- Prime Minister: Silvio Berlusconi
- Preceded by: Claudio Scajola
- Succeeded by: Giulio Santagata

Member of the Chamber of Deputies
- In office 29 April 2008 – 27 May 2010
- Constituency: Campania
- In office 23 April 1992 – 14 April 1994
- Constituency: Naples

Personal details
- Born: 13 December 1960 (age 65) Campobasso, Italy
- Party: PSI (1985–1994); PSR (1994–1996); PS (1996–2001); NPSI (2001–present); PdL (2009–2013); FI (2013–present)
- Height: 1.73 m (5 ft 8 in)
- Spouse: Annamaria Colao
- Children: 1
- Profession: Politician, journalist, business consultant

Stefano Caldoro (born 13 December 1960 in Campobasso, Molise) is an Italian politician. He is the current leader of the New PSI.

== Biography ==
Stefano Caldoro was born on 3 December 1960 in Campobasso. His father was the former socialist deputy Antonio Caldoro. Caldoro has a degree in political science, and in 1985 was elected in the regional council of Campania, where he has held the position of chairman of the Planning and Territory Commission and the position of group's leader of the Italian Socialist Party.

In the 1992 general election he was elected in the Chamber of Deputies. In 1994, after the dissolution of the Italian Socialist Party, Caldoro joined the centre-right coalition, led by Silvio Berlusconi.

In 2001, Caldoro served as Uudersecretary and then as deputy minister of education, university and research in the Berlusconi II Cabinet. Subsequently, he served as minister for the implementation of the government program in the Berlusconi III Cabinet.

On 24 June 2007 Caldoro was appointed secretary of the New Italian Socialist Party. He held office until 2011, when he was appointed president of the same party.

In the 2008 general election Caldoro was again elected in the Chamber of Deputies with The People of Freedom.

At the 2010 regional election Caldoro was elected president of Campania with 54.3% of the votes, defeating the mayor of Salerno Vincenzo De Luca. However, in the following regional election of 2015, he was defeated in turn by De Luca.

== Electoral history ==
Election	House	Constituency	Party	Votes	Result
1992	Chamber of Deputies	Naples–Caserta	PSI	35,810	Elected
2006	Chamber of Deputies	Campania 1	NPSI	–	Not elected
2008	Chamber of Deputies	Campania 1	PdL	– (Note: Elected in a closed list proportional representation system.)	Elected
2022	Senate of the Republic	Campania – Naples Fuorigrotta	FI	78,208	Not elected
