= Lucio Barani =

Italian politician

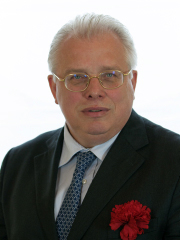

Member of the Senate
- In office 15 March 2013 – 22 March 2018

Member of the Chamber of Deputies
- In office 28 April 2006 – 14 March 2013

Personal details
- Born: 27 May 1953 (age 73) Aulla, Italy
- Party: PSI (until 1994); PSR (1994–1996); PS (1996–2001); NPSI (2001–present); ALA (2015–2018)
- Education: University of Pisa
- Profession: Politician, surgeon

Lucio Barani (born 27 May 1953 in Aulla) is an Italian politician and surgeon.

== Biography ==
Barani graduated in Medicine and Surgery from the University of Pisa. He was mayor of two municipalities: Aulla, from 1990 to 2004, and Villafranca in Lunigiana, from 2004 to 2009.

As Mayor of Aulla, after having approved the granting of the honorary citizenship to Bettino Craxi, together with that to Giulio Andreotti and Arnaldo Forlani, on 24 October 1999 Barani led a delegation of the Municipal Council to Hammamet, Tunisia to deliver it officially. He was so briefly suspended by the prefect of Massa Carrara for having granted honorary citizenship to a man wanted by Italian justice. At Craxi's funeral, celebrated in the cathedral of Tunis, Barani was the only mayor of Italy present with the tricolor sash. He was also one of those who dropped the coffin of the former socialist Prime Minister in the tomb of the cemetery of Hammamet. In February 2003 he erected a commemorative Carrara marble statue of Bettino Craxi in the city center; later this statue was put up for sale by one of the next mayors, and valued at around 150,000 euros. Barani protested as the statue was commissioned and would be the property of the New Italian Socialist Party and not of the Municipality. At his side he erected a monument to the "Martyrs of Tangentopoli", to commemorate the politicians who died in suicide or "persecuted" during the Mani Pulite investigation.

He also erected a sundial-shaped monument dedicated to Marco Pantani, as "a victim of sports justice".

Barani was elected Deputy for the first time in 2006; he was re-elected to the Chamber also in 2008, among the ranks of The People of Freedom. On 25 June 2011 he was appointed Secretary of the New Italian Socialist Party.

In 2013 Barani was elected Senator and joined the parliamentary group Great Autonomies and Freedom (GAL). On 29 July 2015 he left GAL to join Liberal Popular Alliance (group founded by Denis Verdini to support the Renzi Cabinet), of which he became group leader in the Senate. After the numerous controversies with his party following his adhesion to the ALA group, on 5 August Barani resigned as secretary of the New PSI.

On 14 October 2018, Barani was sentenced by the Appellate Court of Genoa to 3 years imprisonment for a double reimbursement case, dating back to when he was mayor of Villafranca. In the first instance Barani had instead been acquitted by the Tribunal of Massa.
