= 2004 European Parliament election in Italy =

- 13 June 2004
- All 78 Italian seats to the European Parliament
- Turnout: 71.72% (▲1.99 pp)
Party	Leader	Vote %	Seats	+/–
The Olive Tree	Romano Prodi	31.08	28	+4
FI	Silvio Berlusconi	20.93	16	−6
AN	Gianfranco Fini	11.49	9	+1
PRC	Fausto Bertinotti	6.06	5	+1
UDC	Pier Ferdinando Casini	5.89	5	+1
LN	Umberto Bossi	4.96	4	0
Greens	Alfonso Pecoraro Scanio	2.47	2	0
PdCI	Oliviero Diliberto	2.42	2	0
Bonino List	Emma Bonino	2.25	2	−5
IdV	Antonio Di Pietro	2.14	2	New
SUE	Gianni De Michelis	2.04	2	New
UDEUR	Clemente Mastella	1.29	1	0
AS	Alessandra Mussolini	1.23	1	New
Pensioners	Carlo Fatuzzo	1.15	1	0
Tricolour Flame	Luca Romagnoli	0.73	1	0
SVP	Elmar Pichler Rolle	0.45	1	0
This lists parties that won seats. See the complete results below.
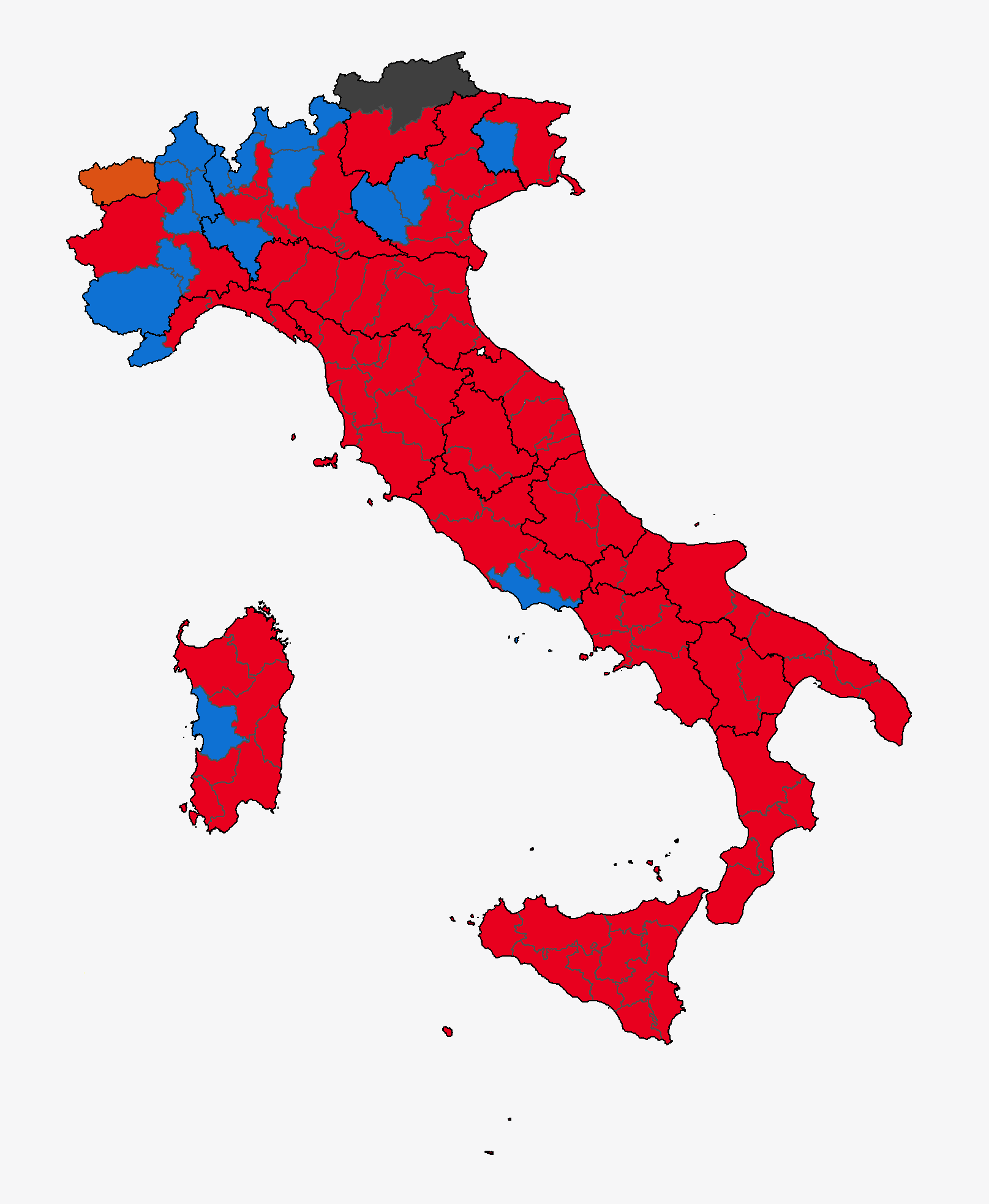
Major party in each province

The 2004 European Parliament election in Italy was held on 12 and 13 June 2004. Italy's highly fragmented party system made it hard to identify an overall trend, but the results were generally seen as a defeat for Italian Prime Minister Silvio Berlusconi and a victory for the centre-left coalition identified with Romano Prodi, who was President of the European Commission until 2004, and was widely expected to re-enter Italian politics at the 2006 Italian general election.

The common list of The Olive Tree (Ulivo), comprising mainly the Democrats of the Left (DS) and Democracy is Freedom – The Daisy (DL), became the largest list, with an important psychological effect; however, expectations for this list were originally somewhat larger, and Massimo D'Alema had made a proclaim about the fall of the second Berlusconi government ("If the unity list reaches 33%, the government has to go").

While the Olive Tree's performance was not as phenomenal as it had hoped, the test indicated a somewhat reduced support for the centre-right coalition. In European elections, Italians tend to vote in a more candidate-oriented way, giving their vote more easily to a candidate outside their usual party; this generally reduces the significance of these elections.

== Electoral system ==
The pure party-list proportional representation was the traditional electoral system of the Italian Republic since its foundation in 1946, so it had been adopted to elect the Italian representatives to the European Parliament too. Two levels were used: a national level to divide seats between parties, and a constituency level to distribute them between candidates. Italian regions were united in 5 constituencies, each electing a group of deputies. At national level, seats were divided between party lists using the largest remainder method with Hare quota. All seats gained by each party were automatically distributed to their local open lists and their most voted candidates.

=== Constituencies ===
Seats are allocated to party lists on a national basis using an electoral quota, with the residue given to the lists with the largest excess over whole quotas. An electoral quota is then calculated for each list and used to allocate seats to each list in each of the five electoral regions.

Electoral Region	Administrative Regions	Seats
North-West	Aosta Valley, Liguria, Lombardy, Piedmont	23
North-East	Emilia-Romagna, Friuli-Venezia Giulia, Trentino-Alto Adige/Südtirol, Veneto	15
Central	Latium, Marche, Tuscany, Umbria	16
Southern	Abruzzo, Apulia, Basilicata, Calabria, Campania, Molise	17
Islands	Sardinia, Sicily	7

== Outgoing MEPs ==
EP Group	Seats	Party	MEPs
European People's Party–European Democrats	34 / 87		
European People's Party–European Democrats	34 / 87	Forza Italia	22
European People's Party–European Democrats	34 / 87	Union of Christian and Centre Democrats	4
European People's Party–European Democrats	34 / 87	Italian People's Party (DL)	4
European People's Party–European Democrats	34 / 87	Union of Democrats for Europe	2
European People's Party–European Democrats	34 / 87	Pensioners' Party	1
European People's Party–European Democrats	34 / 87	South Tyrolean People's Party	1
Socialist Group in the European Parliament	16 / 87		
Socialist Group in the European Parliament	16 / 87	Democrats of the Left	15
Socialist Group in the European Parliament	16 / 87	Italian Democratic Socialists	1
Union for Europe of the Nations	10 / 87		
Union for Europe of the Nations	10 / 87	National Alliance	9
Union for Europe of the Nations	10 / 87	Segni Pact	1
European Liberal Democrat and Reform Party Group	8 / 87		
European Liberal Democrat and Reform Party Group	8 / 87	The Democrats (DL)	4
European Liberal Democrat and Reform Party Group	8 / 87	Italy of Values	2
European Liberal Democrat and Reform Party Group	8 / 87	European Republicans Movement	1
European Liberal Democrat and Reform Party Group	8 / 87	New Italian Socialist Party	1
European United Left–Nordic Green Left	6 / 87		
European United Left–Nordic Green Left	6 / 87	Communist Refoundation Party	4
European United Left–Nordic Green Left	6 / 87	Party of Italian Communists	2
Greens–European Free Alliance	2 / 87	Federation of the Greens	2
Non-Inscrits	11 / 87		
Non-Inscrits	11 / 87	Bonino List	7
Non-Inscrits	11 / 87	Northern League	3
Non-Inscrits	11 / 87	Independent	1

== Main parties and leaders ==
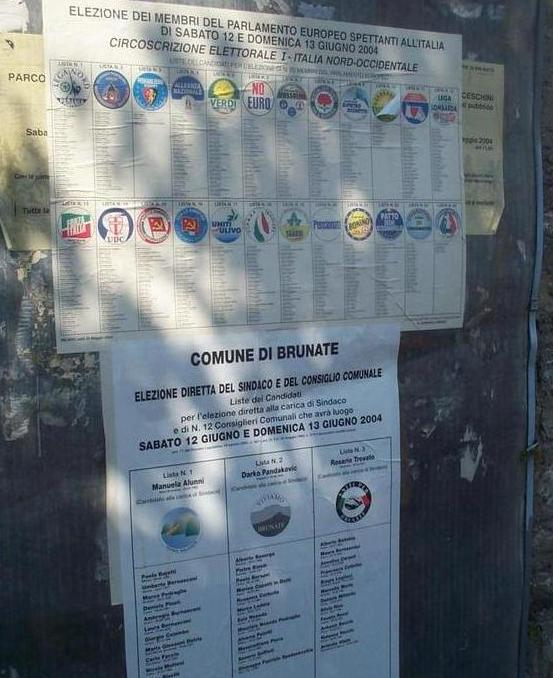
A poster showing party lists for the 2004 European Parliament election

Party	Main ideology	Leader	European party	Outgoing MEPs
United in The Olive Tree: Democrats of the Left (DS); Democracy is Freedom – The Daisy (DL); Italian Democratic Socialists (SDI); European Republicans Movement (MRE)	Several: Social democracy; Social liberalism; Social democracy; Social liberalism	Romano Prodi: Piero Fassino; Francesco Rutelli; Enrico Boselli; Luciana Sbarbati	Several: PES; EDP; PES; ELDR	25 / 78
Forza Italia (FI)	Liberal conservatism	Silvio Berlusconi	EPP	22 / 78
National Alliance (AN)	National conservatism	Gianfranco Fini	AEN	9 / 78
Bonino List	Libertarianism	Emma Bonino	None	7 / 78
Union of Christian and Centre Democrats (UDC)	Christian democracy	Pier Ferdinando Casini	EPP	4 / 78
Communist Refoundation Party (PRC)	Communism	Fausto Bertinotti	PEL	4 / 78
Northern League (LN)	Regionalism	Umberto Bossi	None	3 / 78
Party of Italian Communists (PdCI)	Communism	Oliviero Diliberto	PEL	2 / 78
Federation of the Greens (FdV)	Green politics	Alfonso Pecoraro Scanio	EGP	2 / 78
Italy of Values	Populism	Antonio Di Pietro; Achille Occhetto	None	2 / 78
Union of Democrats for Europe (UDEUR)	Christian democracy	Clemente Mastella	EPP	2 / 78
United Socialists for Europe	Social democracy	Gianni De Michelis; Claudio Signorile	None	1 / 78
Pensioners' Party (PP)	Pensioners' interests	Carlo Fatuzzo	ED	1 / 78
Tricolour Flame (FT)	Neo-fascism	Luca Romagnoli	None	0 / 78
Social Alternative (AS)	Neo-fascism	Alessandra Mussolini	None	0 / 78

== Results ==
← Summary of the 13 June 2004 European Parliament election results in Italy →
Party	Votes	%	+/–	Seats	+/–
United in The Olive Tree: Democrats of the Left (DS); Democracy is Freedom – The Daisy (DL); Independents; Italian Democratic Socialists (SDI); European Republicans Movement (MRE)	10,105,836	31.08	1.53 ▼	24; 12; 7; 2; 2; 1	3 ▼4 ▼0; 2 ▲ New
Forza Italia (FI)	6,806,245	20.93	4.23 ▼	16	6 ▼
National Alliance (AN)	3,736,606	11.49	1.19 ▲	9	1 ▲
Communist Refoundation Party (PRC)	1,969,776	6.06	1.79 ▲	5	1 ▲
Union of Christian and Centre Democrats (UDC)	1,914,726	5.89	1.14 ▲	5	1 ▲
Northern League (LN)	1,613,506	4.96	0.48 ▲	4	0
Federation of the Greens (FdV)	803,356	2.47	0.71 ▲	2	0
Party of Italian Communists (PdCI)	787,613	2.42	0.42 ▲	2	0
Bonino List (LB)	731,536	2.25	6.20 ▼	2	5 ▼
Italy of Values (IdV)	695,179	2.14	New	2	New
United Socialists for Europe (SUE)	664,463	2.04	New	2	New
Union of Democrats for Europe (UDEUR)	419,173	1.29	0.32 ▲	1	0
Social Alternative (LdA – FN – FSN)	400,626	1.23	New	1	New
Pensioners' Party (PP)	374,343	1.15	0.40 ▲	1	0
Tricolour Flame (FT)	237,058	0.73	0.87 ▼	1	0
Italian Republican Party – The Liberals Sgarbi (PRI–LS)	233,144	0.72	0.18 ▲	0	1 ▼
Segni-Scognamiglio Pact (PSS)	172,556	0.53	—	0	1 ▼
LAL – LFV – PSd'Az – UfS	160,101	0.49	—	0	0
Consumers' List (LC)	160,066	0.49	New	0	New
Abolizione Scorporo (Greens Greens – Federalist Greens)	158,988	0.49	New	0	New
South Tyrolean People's Party (SVP)	146,357	0.45	0.05 ▼	1	0
New Country (PN)	78,003	0.24	New	0	New
No Euro (NE)	70,220	0.22	New	0	New
Social Idea Movement (MIS)	47,171	0.15	New	0	New
Federalism (Valdostan Union – others)	29,598	0.09	0.04 ▼	0	0
Valid votes	32,516,246	91.04			
Blank and Invalid votes	3,201,256	8.96			
Totals	35,717,655	100.00	—	78	—
Electorate and voter turnout	49,804,087	71.72			
Source: Ministry of the Interior

Popular vote
Olive Tree	31.1%
FI	20.9%
AN	11.5%
PRC	6.1%
UDC	5.9%
LN	5.0%
FdV	2.5%
PdCI	2.4%
Bonino	2.2%
IdV	2.1%
SUE	2.0%
UDEUR	1.3%
AS	1.2%
PP	1.1%
Others	4.7%

=== Distribution by European group ===
European Parliament group	Seats	National party	Seats
European People's Party–European Democrats	24 / 78	Forza Italia (FI)	16
European People's Party–European Democrats	24 / 78	Union of Christian and Centre Democrats (UDC)	5
European People's Party–European Democrats	24 / 78	Union of Democrats for Europe (UDEUR)	1
European People's Party–European Democrats	24 / 78	Pensioners' Party (PP)	1
European People's Party–European Democrats	24 / 78	South Tyrolean People's Party (SVP)	1
Socialist Group in the European Parliament	16 / 78	Democrats of the Left (DS)	12
Socialist Group in the European Parliament	16 / 78	Italian Democratic Socialists (SDI)	2
Socialist Group in the European Parliament	16 / 78	Independents	2
Alliance of Liberals and Democrats for Europe Group	12 / 78	Democracy is Freedom – The Daisy (DL)	7
Alliance of Liberals and Democrats for Europe Group	12 / 78	Bonino List (LB)	2
Alliance of Liberals and Democrats for Europe Group	12 / 78	Italy of Values (IdV)	2
Alliance of Liberals and Democrats for Europe Group	12 / 78	European Republicans Movement (MRE)	1
Union for Europe of the Nations	9 / 78	National Alliance (AN)	9
European United Left–Nordic Green Left	7 / 78	Communist Refoundation Party (PRC)	5
European United Left–Nordic Green Left	7 / 78	Party of Italian Communists (PdCI)	2
Independence/Democracy	4 / 78	Northern League (LN)	4
The Greens–European Free Alliance	2 / 78	Federation of the Greens (FdV)	2
Non-Inscrits	4 / 78	United Socialists for Europe (SUE)	2
Non-Inscrits	4 / 78	Social Alternative (AS)	1
Non-Inscrits	4 / 78	Tricolour Flame (FT)	1

== See also ==
- 2004 European Parliament election in Lombardy
- 2004 European Parliament election in Piedmont
