= Enrico Boselli =

Italian politician (born 1957)

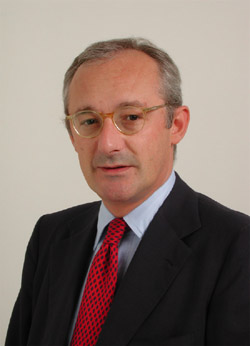

Member of the Chamber of Deputies
- In office 15 April 1994 – 28 April 2008

Member of the European Parliament
- In office 13 June 1999 – 13 June 2004

President of Emilia-Romagna
- In office 6 May 1990 – 5 July 1993
- Preceded by: Luciano Guerzoni
- Succeeded by: Pier Luigi Bersani

Personal details
- Born: 7 January 1957 (age 69) Bologna, Italy
- Party: PSI (till 1994); SI (1994–1998); SDI (1998–2007); PSI (2007–2010); ApI (2010–2016)
- Occupation: Company manager, politician

Enrico Boselli (born 7 January 1957) is an Italian politician. He has been Vice President of Alliance for Italy, and is the former leader of the Italian Democratic Socialists and the modern-day Socialist Party, and former president of Emilia-Romagna.

== Biography ==
A former member of the historical Italian Socialist Party (PSI), Boselli was first elected as MP in 1994. After the dissolution of the PSI in 1994, he has been leader of the Italian Socialists and the Italian Democratic Socialists. He also served as member of the European Parliament from 1999 to 2004 as member of the Group of the Party of European Socialists. From September 1999 to 2001, Boselli served as rapporteur for the second reading of the InfoSoc directive, having been named by the Committee on Legal Affairs and the Internal Market.

Boselli was one of the main minds behind his party's decision to join forces with the Italian Radicals of Emma Bonino to found the Rose in the Fist, on the occasion of the 2006 Italian general election. In 2007, he founded the new Socialist Party, with whom he participated in the 2008 Italian general election but obtained only 0.9% of the vote. In December 2010, Boselli joined the centrist party Alliance for Italy, and became vice-president not long after.
