= Gianni De Michelis =

Italian politician (1940–2019)

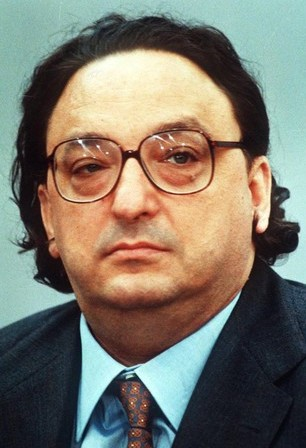

Minister of Foreign Affairs
- In office 23 July 1989 – 28 June 1992
- Prime Minister: Giulio Andreotti
- Preceded by: Giulio Andreotti
- Succeeded by: Vincenzo Scotti

Deputy Prime Minister of Italy
- In office 13 April 1988 – 22 July 1989
- Prime Minister: Ciriaco De Mita
- Preceded by: Giuliano Amato
- Succeeded by: Claudio Martelli

Minister of Labour and Social Security
- In office 4 August 1983 – 17 April 1987
- Prime Minister: Bettino Craxi
- Preceded by: Vincenzo Scotti
- Succeeded by: Ermanno Gorrieri

Minister of State Holdings
- In office 4 April 1980 – 4 August 1983
- Prime Minister: Francesco Cossiga; Arnaldo Forlani; Giovanni Spadolini; Amintore Fanfani
- Preceded by: Siro Lombardini
- Succeeded by: Clelio Darida

Member of the European Parliament
- In office 20 July 2004 – 14 July 2009
- Constituency: Southern Italy

Member of the Chamber of Deputies
- In office 5 July 1976 – 14 April 1994
- Constituency: Venice–Treviso

Personal details
- Born: 26 November 1940 Venice, Italy
- Died: 11 May 2019 (aged 78) Venice, Italy
- Party: PSI (1960–1994); PS (1996–2001); NPSI (2001–2007); PSI (2007–2009); RI (since 2011)
- Height: 1.83 m (6 ft 0 in)
- Spouse: Francesca Barnabò [1964-1997] Stefania Tucci [1999-2001]
- Children: 1
- Education: University of Padua
- Profession: University Professor Politician

Gianni De Michelis (26 November 1940 – 11 May 2019) was an Italian politician and a member of the Italian Socialist Party (PSI), who served as minister in many Italian governments in the 1980s and early 1990s.

== Biography ==
De Michelis was born in Venice in 1940. He graduated in 1963 in Industrial Chemistry at the University of Padua and began his academic career, first as an assistant and then as a lecturer, becoming an associate professor of Chemistry in 1980 at the Ca' Foscari University of Venice. After a long leave due to political and institutional commitments, he returned to university teaching from 1994 to 1999.

He started his political career with the Italian Socialist Party, where he was elected to the municipal council of Venice. He got elected for the first time to the Italian Parliament in 1976 and was elected again in 1979, 1983, 1987, 1992 and 2006. He was Minister of State Holdings from 1980 to 1983. He then became Minister of Work in 1986 (with Bettino Craxi as President of the Council). However, he reached the peak of his political career with his nomination to the Vice-Presidency of the Council in 1988-1989. He became Minister for Foreign Affairs in 1989 and kept that post until 1992.

Between 1993 and 2001, during the so-called "judicial storm of Mani Pulite", he was accused of corruption along with many of the socialist MPs and regional administrators. Within more than 35 different trails, apart from the numerous favorable verdicts, he was convicted of corruption and sentenced to 1 year and 6 months (negotiated) in Venice for highways bribes in Veneto and to 6 months for illegal financing (Enimont bribe, also negotiated).

In 1996, De Michelis founded a political movement named the Socialist Party with Ugo Intini and other former Italian Socialist Party (PSI) members, which later was joined by the Socialist League of Claudio Martelli and Bobo Craxi to form the New PSI in 2001. He was elected secretary of the new party at the first congress.

De Michelis was elected at the 2004 European elections as a Member of the European Parliament (MEP) for Southern Italy with the NPSI, and was therefore a Non-Inscrit in the European Parliament whilst awaiting the acceptance of his party's request of membership in the Socialist Group. He sat in the Committee on Industry, Research and Energy, and was a substitute for the Committee on Legal Affairs, a member of the Delegation for relations with the People's Republic of China and a substitute for the Delegation to the Euro-Mediterranean Parliamentary Assembly.

His leadership, however, had been contested in the Congress of October 2005, where the son of Bettino Craxi, Bobo Craxi, claimed to have been declared secretary after De Michelis had left the hall, declaring the Congress void. This led Bobo Craxi to open a judicial case. The judge, on the second verdict, unquestionably confirmed the right to use the symbol and the secretary to Gianni De Michelis.

At the 2006 Italian general election, he was elected MP for the Italian parliament but gave his seat to Lucio Barani since he decided to stay in the European Parliament. In October 2007, De Michelis joined the newly formed Socialist Party, made up of the diaspora of the historical PSI. At this time, De Michelis, along with fellow former NPSI MEP Alessandro Battilocchio, was admitted into the parliamentary group of the Party of European Socialists.

De Michelis died in Venice on 11 May 2019 at the age of 78.

== Personal life ==
De Michelis was a great lover of dance and discos. In 1988, he wrote a book entitled "Dove Andiamo a Ballare Questa Sera?" (English: Where to Go Dancing this Night?) in which he reviewed 250 Italian dance nightclubs.

== Electoral history ==
Election	House	Constituency	Party	Votes	Result
1976	Chamber of Deputies	Venice–Treviso	PSI	18,736	Elected
1979	Chamber of Deputies	Venice–Treviso	PSI	13,647	Elected
1983	Chamber of Deputies	Venice–Treviso	PSI	26,892	Elected
1987	Chamber of Deputies	Venice–Treviso	PSI	31,338	Elected
1992	Chamber of Deputies	Venice–Treviso	PSI	23,720	Elected
2004	European Parliament	Southern Italy	NPSI	33,908	Elected

== Writings ==
- Mauro Cascio; Gianni De Michelis (preface) (2005). Storia (apologetica) della massoneria. Biblioteca massonica (in Italian). Foggia: Bastogi. ISBN 9788881857364. OCLC 61392815.
