= Lanfranco Turci =

Italian politician

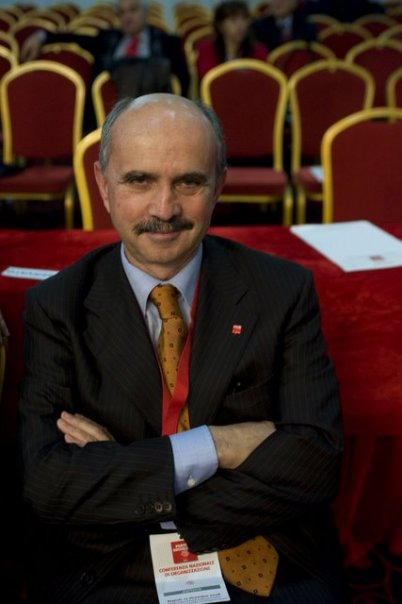
Lanfranco Turci

Lanfranco Turci (born 2 December 1940 in Campogalliano) is an Italian politician.

He has been the president of the Emilia-Romagna regional council (1978–1987), national president of the League of Cooperatives (1987–1992), deputy (1992, 1994, 1996, 2006), senator (2001) and undersecretary to the Industry in the D'Alema 2 government (1999–2000).
