= Pietro Lunardi =

Italian politician and engineer (born 1939)

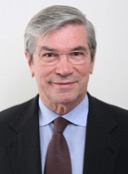

Minister of Infrastructures and Transports
- In office 11 June 2001 – 17 May 2006
- Prime Minister: Silvio Berlusconi

Personal details
- Born: 19 July 1939 (age 87) Parma, Kingdom of Italy
- Party: Forza Italia (until 2009); PdL (2009-2013)
- Education: University of Padua
- Occupation: Civil engineer
- Profession: Politician, Entrepreneur
- Website: www.pietrolunardi.it

Pietro Lunardi (born 19 July 1939) is an Italian politician and engineer.

== Career ==
Born in Parma, he took his degree in civil engineering and transportation at the University of Padua in 1966.

He was the Italian Minister for Infrastructure and Transportation from 2001 to 2006, and is the author of more than 130 publications.
