= Italian Democratic Socialists =

Political party, 1998–2007

Italian Democratic Socialists Socialisti Democratici Italiani
- Abbreviation: SDI
- Secretary: Enrico Boselli
- Founded: 10 May 1998
- Dissolved: 5 October 2007
- Merger of: Italian Socialists; Italian Democratic Socialist Party
- Merged into: Italian Socialist Party
- Newspaper: Avanti! MondOperaio
- Youth wing: Federation of Young Socialists
- Membership (2006): 71,783
- Ideology: Social democracy
- Political position: Centre-left
- National affiliation: The Olive Tree (1998–2005); The Sunflower (2001); Rose in the Fist (2005–2007); The Union (2005–2007)
- European affiliation: Party of European Socialists
- European Parliament group: Socialist Group
- International affiliation: Socialist International

The Italian Democratic Socialists (Italian: Socialisti Democratici Italiani, SDI) was a social-democratic political party in Italy. The party was the direct continuation of the Italian Socialists, the legal successor of the historical Italian Socialist Party. The Italian Democratic Socialist Party, the other long-time Italian social-democratic party, was merged into it along with other minor parties. The party's long-time leader was Enrico Boselli, a former president of Emilia-Romagna (1990–1993). In 2007, the SDI were merged with other descendants of the PSI to form the modern-day Italian Socialist Party.

== History ==
=== Early years ===
The SDI were founded in 1998 by the merger of the Italian Socialists (Enrico Boselli, Roberto Villetti, and Ottaviano Del Turco), the Italian Democratic Socialist Party (Gian Franco Schietroma, and Giorgio Carta), a portion of the Labour Federation, a portion of the Socialist Party (Ugo Intini), and the Socialist League (Claudio Martelli and Bobo Craxi). In their first appearance on the national stage, the 1999 European Parliament election in Italy, the SDI won 2.2% of the votes and two MEPs. In December 1999, the SDI formed a short-lived centrist alliance (The Clover) with the Union for the Republic and Italian Republican Party, which was responsible for the fall of the D'Alema I Cabinet in December 1999.

The SDI re-entered The Olive Tree of the centre-left coalition and in 2000 they were originally touted for inclusion in the Democracy is Freedom – The Daisy joint list, before being rejected by the Christian-inspired parties of the alliance, notably including the Italian People's Party. For the 2001 Italian general election, the SDI formed an unusual alliance (The Sunflower) with the Federation of the Greens, which was disbanded soon after the election due to political divergences and ultimately to the disappointing electoral result: 2.2% of the vote, while the two parties' combined result in 1999 had been 4.0%. In the 2004 European Parliament election in Italy, two SDI MEPs were elected on the United in the Olive Tree ticket.

=== The Rose in the Fist ===
In 2001, Claudio Martelli and Bobo Craxi left the party to form, along with Gianni De Michelis, the New Italian Socialist Party (NPSI), which joined the House of Freedoms of the centre-right coalition, while in 2004 Giorgio Carta left to re-establish the Italian Democratic Socialist Party.

In 2005, the SDI entered in alliance with the Italian Radicals, forming the Rose in the Fist (RnP) electoral list. In 2006, the Socialist Unity of Claudio Signorile joined the SDI, while some members of NPSI, as Donato Robilotta, founded the Reformist Socialists and directly joined the RnP.

In the 2006 Italian general election, the RnP list won only 2.6% of the vote, much less than the combination of the two parties before the alliance, as the Radicals lost voters in their strongholds in the North to Forza Italia, while the Socialists lost ground in the South to The Olive Tree parties.

=== Socialist Party ===
During a party convention in April 2007, Boselli launched the proposal of a Socialist Constituent Assembly, open to all the Italian social democrats and especially to the remnants of the old Italian Socialist Party, while Ottaviano Del Turco supported the entry of the SDI in the Democratic Party (PD). Boselli was re-elected secretary of the party with 784 votes out of 787 and 3 abstentions. In May, Del Turco and his faction left the SDI and formed the Reformist Alliance (Italian: Alleanza Riformista), which would merge into the PD.

Several groups, including a large portion of the New Italian Socialist Party, The Italian Socialists, Democracy and Socialism, and the Association for the Rose in the Fist, decided to join forces with the SDI. This happened on 5 October 2007, when they were merged into a unified Socialist Party, later renamed the Italian Socialist Party on 7 October 2009 to recall the historical party of the same name. The new party obtained 1.0% of the vote and no seats in Parliament in the 2008 Italian general election.

== Leadership ==
- Secretary: Enrico Boselli (1998–2008)
  - Deputy Secretary: Roberto Villetti (1998–2008), Claudio Martelli (1999–2001), Gian Franco Schietroma (2001–2002)

== Symbols ==
1998–2004

2004–2007
