= Christian Democracy (Italy, 2002) =

Christian Democracy Democrazia Cristiana
- Secretary: Denis Martucci
- Founded: 2002
- Ideology: Christian democracy Social conservatism
- Political position: Centre

Website
- www.democrazia-cristiana.org

Christian Democracy (Italian: Democrazia Cristiana, DC) is a minor Christian democratic and strongly social-conservative political party in Italy. The current leader of the party is Denis Martucci.

The party proposed itself as the core of a refoundation of the original Christian Democracy and to effect the reunification of all the various Christian-democratic parties in Italy. It was once part of the Union centre-left coalition, but then distanced itself from it, promoting an autonomous path and becoming a minor ally of The People of Freedom, later Forza Italia.

== History ==
In December Alessandro Duce (last administrative secretary of the Christian Democracy) presented a summons to the Civil Court of Rome and obtained from the then President of the Court Luigi Scotti the notification, by public proclamations, of the convocation of a new assembly to all members of the National Council of the party elected on the occasion of the 18th congress, through publication in the Official Gazette on 4 February 2002. The aim was to ascertain and declare that there had been no deliberative acts of dissolution of the Christian Democracy and that the legal representative of that party, although in a state of prorogatio, was still the same Duce.

Duce was acclaimed political secretary of the party on 16 March 2002, but after a few days the Tribunal decreed that the resolutions that had changed the name of the DC were legitimate and therefore that there had been no "dormant" party since 1994. The legal events the former Christian Democrats therefore only concerned the Italian People's Party (PPI) and the United Christian Democrats (CDU), while Duce, using the old name and the symbol of the party, had violated an agreement that he too had signed in 1999 (agreement between the PPI and the CDU which sanctioned mortgage recognition, in favor of two parties, of the ownership of the name and the symbol of "Christian Democracy" and which has committed both sides not to use them and to prevent even new political formations from using them).

Between June 2002 and December 2003 the party was led by Angelo Sandri. In the 2004 European Parliament election, the party ran under the banner of New Country, winning only 0.2% of the vote. This alliance was not agreed by Sandri, who was ousted by new secretary Giuseppe Pizza in July 2004, leading him to launch his own Christian Democracy.

Since then there had been several disputes between Pizza and Sandri on the property of the name and the symbol, which was also claimed by the Union of Christian and Centre Democrats (UDC) and especially by Rocco Buttiglione, former leader of the United Christian Democrats, who used the symbol from 1995 to 2002, before passing it to UDC. However, in November 2006, a tribunal of Rome declared Pizza's Christian Democracy as the only legitimate heir of the historical DC. This ruling was contested both by Sandri and Buttiglione.

In the 2006 general election the party, which was not yet permitted to use the historical symbol of DC, formed an alliance with the Consumers' List within the Union. The alliance elected only a senator in Calabria, home-region of Giuseppe Pizza: Pietro Fuda, member of the Southern Democratic Party.

In September 2007, after polling about 1% nationally in May provincial elections, several tiny centrist and Christian-democratic parties, including Veneto for the EPP led by Giorgio Carollo, began to unite under its banner. In October 2007, DC formed a federation with Veneto for the EPP and Liga Fronte Veneto, a separatist group formed by the Liga Veneta–Lega Nord fissure, however the alliance was soon disbanded.

In the 2008 general election the party supported The People of Freedom (PdL). But the party was excluded by the Ministry of the Interior from the electoral competition because of the similarity of its symbol with that of UDC, only to be re-introduced ten days before the election. Since the re-printing of the election ballots would have taken more than a week, Giuseppe Pizza decided not to take part to the election, in order to avoid the postponement of the election. Soon after the election, which was convincingly won by the centre-right, Giuseppe Pizza was appointed Under-Secretary of Education, University and Research in Berlusconi IV Cabinet.

In March 2012 former DC president Darida launched a new Christian Democracy along with Gianni Fontana, Silvio Lega and Giampiero Catone.

In the 2013 general election the DC made its entry into the Italian Parliament, by electing Antonio Marotta and Riccardo Gallo to the Chamber of Deputies in the PdL's list, while Pizza was not elected.

In November 2013 Pizza and other party members joined the new Forza Italia, so the party leadership was assumed by Denis Martucci, former secretary of the Piedmontese section of the party.

== Leadership ==
- Secretary: Alessandro Duce (2002), Angelo Sandri (2002–2003), Giuseppe Pizza (2003–2013), Denis Martucci (2015– )
- President: Carlo Senaldi (2002–2003), Angelo Sandri (2003–2004), Giuseppe Alessi (2004–2009), Alessandro Nasti (2009–2013)
