= Legislature XV of Italy =

15th legislature of the Italian Republic (2006–2008)

Legislature XV of Italy XV legislatura della Repubblica Italiana
- 15th legislature

Type
- Type: bicameral
- Houses: Chamber of Deputies; Senate of the Republic

History
- Founded: 28 April 2006
- Disbanded: 28 April 2008 (2 years, 0 days)
- Preceded by: XIV Legislature
- Succeeded by: XVI Legislature

Leadership
- President of the Senate: Franco Marini, The Daisy since 29 April 2006
- President of the Chamber of Deputies: Fausto Bertinotti, PRC since 29 April 2006

Structure
- Seats: C: 630; S: 322 (315 + 7)
- Chamber of Deputies political groups: PD–L'Ulivo (194); FI (131); AN (68); PRC (40); UDC (36); LN (22); RnP (21); SD (20); IdV (17); PdCI (17); FdV (15); UDEUR (11); Mixed (33)
- Senate political groups: PD–L'Ulivo (84); FI (73); AN (37); PRC (26); UDC (18); LN (12); FdV–PdCI–CU (10); SD (10); Aut. (10); DCA–PRI–MpA (10); Mixed (32)

Elections
- Chamber of Deputies voting system: Porcellum
- Senate voting system: Porcellum
- Last general election: 9–10 April 2006

Meeting place
- Palazzo Montecitorio, Rome (C)
- Palazzo Madama, Rome (S)

Website
- leg15.camera.it www.senato.it/Leg15/home

Constitution
- Constitution of Italy

The Legislature XV of Italy (Italian: XV Legislatura della Repubblica Italiana) started on 28 April 2006 and ended on 28 April 2008. Its composition resulted from the election of 9–10 April 2006, called after President Ciampi dissolved the houses on 11 February 2006, at the end of the previous legislature. This legislature was the second shortest in the history of the Italian Republic, lasting exactly two years, and ending when President Giorgio Napolitano dissolved the houses on 6 February 2008, after a vote of no confidence on the incumbent Prodi Cabinet.

The election was the first one with the new preferential block electoral system (also known as Porcellum) introduced by Roberto Calderoli in 2005, and later declared partially unconstitutional by the Constitutional Court.

== Government ==
Prime Minister	Party	Term of office		Government	Composition
Prime Minister	Party	Took office	Left office	Government	Composition
Romano Prodi (b. 1939)	Independent	17 May 2006	8 May 2008	Prodi II	DS • DL • PRC • RnP • PdCI • IdV • FdV • UDEUR (The Union)

== Composition ==
=== Chamber of Deputies ===
The number of elected deputies is 630.

- President: Fausto Bertinotti (PRC), elected on 29 April 2006
- Vice Presidents: Pierluigi Castagnetti (L'Ulivo, then PD), Carlo Leoni (L'Ulivo, then SD), Giulio Tremonti (FI), Giorgia Meloni (AN)

Parliamentary groups in the Chamber of Deputies
Initial composition		Final composition		
Parliamentary group	Seats	Parliamentary group	Seats	Change
The Olive Tree	218	Democratic Party – The Olive Tree	194	▼24
Forza Italia	134	Forza Italia	131	▼3
National Alliance	72	National Alliance	68	▼4
Communist Refoundation – European Left	41	Communist Refoundation – European Left	40	▼1
UDC (CCD – CDU)	39	UDC (Union of Christian and Centre Democrats)	36	▼3
Lega Nord Padania	23	Lega Nord Padania	22	▼1
Italy of Values	20	Italy of Values	17	▼3
		Socialists and Radicals – RnP	21	▲21
		Democratic Left. For European Socialism	20	▲20
		Italian Communists	17	▲17
		Greens	15	▲15
		Populars – UDEUR	11	▲11
		DCA – Christian Democracy for Autonomies – New PSI	5	▲5
Mixed	83	Mixed	33	▼50
Linguistic Minorities	5	Linguistic Minorities	5	Steady
The Rose in the Fist	18			▼18
Italian Communists	16			▼16
Greens	16			▼16
Populars – UDEUR	14			▼14
Christian Democracy – Socialist Party	6			▼6
		MpA – Movement for Autonomy	6	▲6
		The Right	4	▲4
Non inscrits	8	Non inscrits	18	▲10
Total seats	630	Total seats	630	Steady

=== Senate ===
The number of elected senators was 315. At the start of the Legislature the number of life senators was seven (Francesco Cossiga and Oscar Luigi Scalfaro as former Presidents, as well as nominated life senators Giulio Andreotti, Rita Levi-Montalcini, Emilio Colombo, Giorgio Napolitano, and Sergio Pininfarina). During the legislature Giorgio Napolitano was elected president, thus leaving his seat as life senator. Carlo Azeglio Ciampi became life senator on 15 May 2006 as the former president.

- President: Franco Marini (L'Ulivo, then PD), elected on 29 April 2006
- Vice Presidents: Gavino Angius (L'Ulivo, then SD), Roberto Calderoli (LN), Milziade Caprili (PRC), Mario Baccini (UdC)

Parliamentary groups in the Senate of the Republic
Initial composition		Final composition		
Parliamentary group	Seats	Parliamentary group	Seats	Change
The Olive Tree	108	Democratic Party – The Olive Tree	84	▼24
Forza Italia	77	Forza Italia	73	▼4
National Alliance	41	National Alliance	37	▼4
Communist Refoundation – European Left	27	Communist Refoundation – European Left	26	▼1
Union of Christian and Centre Democrats (UDC)	21	Union of Christian and Centre Democrats (UDC)	18	▼3
Lega Nord Padania	13	Lega Nord Padania	12	▼1
Together with the Union Greens and Italian Communists	11	Together with the Union Greens and Italian Communists	10	▼1
		Christian Democracy for Autonomies – Italian Republican Party – Movement for Autonomy	10	▲10
		For the Autonomies	10	▲10
		Democratic Left for European Socialism	10	▲10
Mixed	24	Mixed	32	▲6
Italy of Values	5	Italy of Values	3	▼2
Populars – UDEUR	3	Populars – UDEUR	2	▼1
Southern Democratic Party	1	Southern Democratic Party	1	Steady
For the Autonomies	4			▼4
Christian Democracy for Autonomies	2			▼2
Movement for Autonomy	2			▼2
		The Right	3	▲3
		Socialist Party	3	▲3
		Liberal Democrats Union	3	▲3
		Democratic Union for Consumers	2	▲2
		Italians in the World	1	▲1
		Citizens' Political Movement	1	▲1
		Critical Left	1	▲1
		Popular Civic Federative Movement	1	▲1
		Towards the European People's Party	1	▲1
Non inscrits	7	Non inscrits	10	▲3
Total seats	322	Total seats	322	Steady

==== Senators for Life ====
Senator	Motivation	Appointed by	From	Till
Giulio Andreotti	Merits in the social field	President Francesco Cossiga	Previous legislature	Next legislature
Francesco Cossiga	Former president of Italy	ex officio	Previous legislature	Next legislature
Oscar Luigi Scalfaro	Former president of Italy	ex officio	Previous legislature	Next legislature
Rita Levi Montalcini	Merits in the social and scientific field	President Carlo Azeglio Ciampi	Previous legislature	Next legislature
Emilio Colombo	Merits in the social field	President Carlo Azeglio Ciampi	Previous legislature	Next legislature
Giorgio Napolitano	Merits in the social field	President Carlo Azeglio Ciampi	Previous legislature	15 May 2006 (elected president of Italy)
Sergio Pininfarina	Merits in the social field	President Carlo Azeglio Ciampi	Previous legislature	Next legislature
Carlo Azeglio Ciampi	Former president of Italy	ex officio	15 May 2006	Next legislature
