= Angela Lombardi =

Italian politician (born 1969)

Angela Lombardi (born in Rivello, 9 May 1969) is an Italian politician and technical high school teacher.

Lombardi graduated university with a degree in 'lettere moderne' (roughly equivalent to modern humanities or literature). She served in Italy's 15th Legislature, having been elected to the Italian Chamber of Deputies in the 2006 Italian general election as a member of the Communist Refoundation Party. During her time there, she headed the 13th Commission (Agriculture) from 7 June 2006 to 28 April 2008. She lost her re-election in the 2008 Italian general election.

In May 2015, she wrote an open letter to the then-Prime Minister, Matteo Renzi, criticizing his "Buona Scuola" proposal as attacking school teachers.
