= 2006 Italian general election in Lombardy =

The 2006 Italian general election took place on 9–10 April 2006.

The election was won in Lombardy by the centre-right House of Freedoms coalition, differently from what happen at the national result. Eleven provinces gave a majority or a plurality to Silvio Berlusconi's alliance, while voters of the Province of Mantua supported the new Italian Prime Minister Romano Prodi.

== Results ==
=== Chamber of Deputies ===
| Coalition leader | votes | votes (%) | seats | Party | votes | votes (%) | seats |
|---|---|---|---|---|---|---|---|
| Silvio Berlusconi | 3,618,754 | 56.9 | 50 | Forza Italia | 1,724,281 | 27.1 | 24 |
| Silvio Berlusconi | 3,618,754 | 56.9 | 50 | Lega Nord | 745,035 | 11.7 | 11 |
| Silvio Berlusconi | 3,618,754 | 56.9 | 50 | National Alliance | 647,560 | 10.2 | 9 |
| Silvio Berlusconi | 3,618,754 | 56.9 | 50 | Union of Christian and Centre Democrats | 376,021 | 5.9 | 6 |
| Silvio Berlusconi | 3,618,754 | 56.9 | 50 | Others | 125,857 | 2.0 | - |
| Romano Prodi | 2,738,416 | 43.1 | 48 | The Olive Tree | 1,698,099 | 26.7 | 33 |
| Romano Prodi | 2,738,416 | 43.1 | 48 | Communist Refoundation Party | 351,700 | 5.5 | 6 |
| Romano Prodi | 2,738,416 | 43.1 | 48 | Rose in the Fist | 146,986 | 2.3 | 2 |
| Romano Prodi | 2,738,416 | 43.1 | 48 | Federation of the Greens | 129,628 | 2.0 | 2 |
| Romano Prodi | 2,738,416 | 43.1 | 48 | Italy of Values | 124,976 | 2.0 | 2 |
| Romano Prodi | 2,738,416 | 43.1 | 48 | Party of Italian Communists | 111,904 | 1.8 | 2 |
| Romano Prodi | 2,738,416 | 43.1 | 48 | Others | 175,123 | 2.8 | 1 |
| Others | | | - | Others | | | - |
| Total coalitions | 6,539,170 | 100.0 | 98 | Total parties | 6,539,170 | 100.0 | 98 |

Source: Ministry of the Interior

=== Senate ===
| Coalition leader | votes | votes (%) | seats | Party | votes | votes (%) | seats |
|---|---|---|---|---|---|---|---|
| Silvio Berlusconi | 3,342,468 | 57.0 | 27 | Forza Italia | 1,623,745 | 27.7 | 14 |
| Silvio Berlusconi | 3,342,468 | 57.0 | 27 | Lega Nord | 652,047 | 11.1 | 5 |
| Silvio Berlusconi | 3,342,468 | 57.0 | 27 | National Alliance | 572,242 | 9.8 | 5 |
| Silvio Berlusconi | 3,342,468 | 57.0 | 27 | Union of Christian and Centre Democrats | 343,269 | 5.9 | 3 |
| Silvio Berlusconi | 3,342,468 | 57.0 | 27 | Others | 151,165 | 2.5 | - |
| Romano Prodi | 2,501,467 | 42.6 | 20 | Democrats of the Left | 726,105 | 12.4 | 7 |
| Romano Prodi | 2,501,467 | 42.6 | 20 | Democracy is Freedom – The Daisy | 588,856 | 10.0 | 6 |
| Romano Prodi | 2,501,467 | 42.6 | 20 | Communist Refoundation Party | 407,939 | 7.0 | 4 |
| Romano Prodi | 2,501,467 | 42.6 | 20 | Together with the Union (Greens–PdCI) | 588,856 | 4.8 | 3 |
| Romano Prodi | 2,501,467 | 42.6 | 20 | Italy of Values | 150,116 | 2.6 | - |
| Romano Prodi | 2,501,467 | 42.6 | 20 | Rose in the Fist | 128,849 | 2.2 | - |
| Romano Prodi | 2,501,467 | 42.6 | 20 | Others | 220,050 | 3.8 | - |
| Others | 25,193 | 0.4 | - | Others | 25,193 | 0.4 | - |
| Total coalitions | 5,869,128 | 100.0 | 47 | Total parties | 5,869,128 | 100.0 | 47 |

Source: Ministry of the Interior
