= Caminiti =

Caminiti is an Italian surname. Notable people with the surname include:

- Anthony Caminiti (born 2003), Australian footballer
- Cam Caminiti (born 2006), American baseball player
- Filippo Caminiti (1895–1955), Italian politician
- Giuseppe Caminiti (1935–2025), Italian politician
- Ken Caminiti (1963–2004), American baseball player
