= Legislature XIV of Italy =

14th legislature of the Italian Republic (2001–2006)

Legislature XIV of Italy XIV legislatura della Repubblica Italiana
- 14th legislature

Type
- Type: bicameral
- Houses: Chamber of Deputies; Senate of the Republic

History
- Founded: 30 May 2001
- Disbanded: 27 April 2006 (4 years, 332 days)
- Preceded by: XIII Legislature
- Succeeded by: XV Legislature

Leadership
- President of the Senate: Marcello Pera, Forza Italia since 30 May 2001
- President of the Chamber of Deputies: Pier Ferdinando Casini, UDC since 31 May 2001

Structure
- Seats: C: 610; S: 315 + 5
- Chamber of Deputies political groups: FI (167); DS–L'Ulivo (129); AN (94); Daisy–L'Ulivo (80); UDC (38); LN (26); PRC (12); Mixed (64)
- Senate political groups: FI (76); DS–L'Ulivo (64); AN (46); Daisy–L'Ulivo (35); UDC (30); LN (17); Aut. (10); FdV–L'Unione (10); Mixed (34)

Elections
- Chamber of Deputies voting system: Scorporo
- Senate voting system: Scorporo
- Last general election: 13 May 2001

Meeting place
- Palazzo Montecitorio, Rome (C)
- Palazzo Madama, Rome (S)

Website
- leg14.camera.it www.senato.it/Leg14/home

Constitution
- Constitution of Italy

The Legislature XIV of Italy (Italian: XIV Legislatura della Repubblica Italiana) started on 30 May 2001 and ended on 27 April 2006. Its composition resulted from the general election of 13 May 2001. The election was called by President Ciampi, after he dissolved the houses of Parliament on 8 March 2001. The legislature ended after its natural course of five years, soon after the houses were dissolved again by Ciampi on 11 February 2006.

The election leading to the composition of this legislature was characterized by the use of decoy lists ("liste civetta") by both major coalitions (the House of Freedoms and the Olive Tree), in order to "de facto" turn the scorporo (partially compensatory) system implemented by the electoral law into a parallel voting system. In the case of the House of Freedoms, this tactic was so effective that Forza Italia did not have enough candidates for the seats that had won, missing out on 12 seats.

== Government ==
Prime Minister	Party	Term of office		Government	Composition
Prime Minister	Party	Took office	Left office	Government	Composition
Silvio Berlusconi (b. 1936)	Forza Italia	11 June 2001	23 April 2005	Berlusconi II	FI • AN • LN • CCD • CDU (House of Freedoms)
Silvio Berlusconi (b. 1936)	Forza Italia	23 April 2005	17 May 2006	Berlusconi III	FI • AN • LN • UDC • NPSI • PRI (House of Freedoms)

== Composition ==
=== Chamber of Deputies ===
The number of elected deputies was 613. Although the total number of seats was of 630, at the start of the legislation it was not possible to assign the remaining 17 seats (distributed between the House of Freedoms and The Daisy) because of missing candidates in the electoral lists. Some of these seats were assigned later during the legislature.

- President: Pier Ferdinando Casini (UDC), elected on 31 May 2001
- Vice Presidents: Alfredo Biondi (FI), Publio Fiori (Mixed), Fabio Mussi (DS – L'Ulivo), Clemente Mastella (Mixed – UDEUR)

Parliamentary groups in the Chamber of Deputies
Initial composition		Final composition		
Parliamentary group	Seats	Parliamentary group	Seats	Change
Forza Italia	178	Forza Italia	167	▼11
Democrats of the Left – The Olive Tree	137	Democrats of the Left – The Olive Tree	129	▼8
National Alliance	99	National Alliance	94	▼5
The Daisy – DL – The Olive Tree	80	The Daisy – DL – The Olive Tree	80	Steady
CCD – CDU White Flower	40	UDC Union of Christian and Centre Democrats (CCD – CDU)	38	▼2
Lega Nord Padania	30	Lega Nord Padania Federation	26	▼4
		Communist Refoundation	12	▲12
Mixed	49	Mixed	64	▲15
Italian Communists	9	Italian Communists	10	▲1
Linguistic Minorities	5	Linguistic Minorities	5	Steady
Communist Refoundation	11			▼11
New PSI	3			▼3
		Populars – UDEUR	11	▲11
		The Rose in the Fist	11	▲11
		Greens – The Union	7	▲7
		Liberal Democrats – Republicans – New PSI	6	▲6
		Democratic Ecologists	4	▲4
		MRE – European Republicans Movement	3	▲3
Non inscrits	21	Non inscrits	7	▼14
Total seats	613	Total seats	610	▼3

=== Senate ===
The number of elected senators was 315. At the beginning of the legislature there were nine life senators (Giovanni Leone, Francesco Cossiga and Oscar Luigi Scalfaro as former Presidents, and the nominated life senators Carlo Bo, Norberto Bobbio, Gianni Agnelli, Giulio Andreotti, Francesco De Martino and Paolo Emilio Taviani). After the death of Leone, Bo, Bobbio, Agnelli, De Martino and Taviani, and the nomination of the new life senators Rita Levi-Montalcini, Emilio Colombo, Mario Luzi (who died in February 2005), Giorgio Napolitano and Sergio Pininfarina, the total number of senators at the end of the legislature was of 320.

- President: Marcello Pera (FI), elected on 30 May 2001
- Vice Presidents: Roberto Calderoli (LN) until 20 July 2004, Domenico Fisichella (AN, then Mixed), Cesare Salvi (DS – L'Ulivo), Lamberto Dini (The Daisy), Francesco Moro (LN) from 29 September 2004

Parliamentary groups in the Senate of the Republic
Initial composition		Final composition		
Parliamentary group	Seats	Parliamentary group	Seats	Change
Forza Italia	82	Forza Italia	76	▼6
Democrats of the Left – The Olive Tree	65	Democrats of the Left – The Olive Tree	64	▼1
National Alliance	45	National Alliance	46	▲1
Daisy	43	Daisy – DL – The Olive Tree	35	▼8
CCD – CDU: White Flower	29	Union of Christian and Centre Democrats (CCD – CDU)	30	▲1
Lega Nord Padania	17	Lega Nord Padania	17	Steady
For the Autonomies	10	For the Autonomies	10	Steady
Greens – The Olive Tree	10	Greens – The Union	10	Steady
Mixed	23	Mixed	34	▲11
Italian Democratic Socialists	6	Rose in the Fist	6	Steady
Communist Refoundation	4	Communist Refoundation	4	Steady
Party of Italian Communists	2	Party of Italian Communists	2	Steady
Freedom and Justice for the Olive Tree	1	Il Cantiere	2	▲1
League for Lombard Autonomy	1	League for Lombard Autonomy	1	Steady
New PSI	1	New PSI	1	Steady
Italian Republican Party	1	Italian Republican Party	1	Steady
MS – Tricolour Flame	1	MSI – Tricolour Flame	1	Steady
Lombard Territory Movement	1			▼1
		Populars UDEUR	5	▲5
		Italy of Values	2	▲2
		House of Freedoms	1	▲1
		Christian Democracy for Autonomies	1	▲1
Non inscrits	5	Non inscrits	7	▲2
Total seats	324	Total seats	320	▼4

==== Senators for Life ====
Senator	Motivation	Appointed by	From	Till
Giovanni Leone	Former president of Italy	ex officio	Previous legislature	9 November 2001 (deceased)
Carlo Bo	Merits in the literary field	President Sandro Pertini	Previous legislature	21 July 2001 (deceased)
Norberto Bobbio	Merits in the social and scientific field	President Sandro Pertini	Previous legislature	9 January 2004 (deceased)
Gianni Agnelli	Merits in the social field	President Francesco Cossiga	Previous legislature	24 January 2003 (deceased)
Giulio Andreotti	Merits in the social field	President Francesco Cossiga	Previous legislature	Next legislature
Francesco De Martino	Merits in the social field	President Francesco Cossiga	Previous legislature	18 November 2002 (deceased)
Paolo Emilio Taviani	Merits in the social field	President Francesco Cossiga	Previous legislature	18 June 2001 (deceased)
Francesco Cossiga	Former president of Italy	ex officio	Previous legislature	Next legislature
Oscar Luigi Scalfaro	Former president of Italy	ex officio	Previous legislature	Next legislature
Rita Levi Montalcini	Merits in the social and scientific field	President Carlo Azeglio Ciampi	1 August 2001	Next legislature
Emilio Colombo	Merits in the social field	President Carlo Azeglio Ciampi	14 January 2003	Next legislature
Mario Luzi	Merits in the literary field	President Carlo Azeglio Ciampi	14 October 2004	28 February 2005 (deceased)
Giorgio Napolitano	Merits in the social field	President Carlo Azeglio Ciampi	23 September 2005	Next legislature
Sergio Pininfarina	Merits in the social field	President Carlo Azeglio Ciampi	23 September 2005	Next legislature
