= Italian Associations in South America =

Italian Associations in South America Associazioni Italiane in Sud America
- Leader: Luigi Pallaro; Ricardo Antonio Merlo
- Founded: 2005
- Dissolved: c. 2008
- Headquarters: Marcelo T. de Alvear 1149 2º piso (1058), Buenos Aires, Argentina

The Italian Associations in South America (Italian: Associazioni Italiane in Sud America, AISA) was a political party in Italy that represented voters living in South America, reflecting the significant Italian immigration to the continent.

In the 2006 general election, the party secured one seat in the Chamber of Deputies and one seat in the Senate. Luigi Pallaro represented the party in the Senate while Ricardo Antonio Merlo represented it in the Chamber of Deputies until 2008, when he left to establish the Associative Movement Italians Abroad.

Notably, former senator Pallaro became embroiled in the controversy as the sole independent member of the Senate following the election. The Union, having just two more seats than the rival House of Freedoms, Pallaro did not formally declare a preference for either side. However, he generally aligned with the centre-left government of Romano Prodi.

Pallaro's political career came to an end when he was not re-elected in the 2008 general election. Meanwhile, Merlo was successfully re-elected under a different list.
