= Anna Maria Cardano =

Italian politician

Anna Maria Cardano (born 9 February 1960 in Galliate) is an Italian politician and teacher.

Cardano graduated with a major in lettere moderne (roughly equivalent to Modern Humanities or Modern Literature) from the University of Padua. She served as a member of Italy's 15th Legislature, which spanned from 28 April 2006 to 28 April 2008. She joined the Communist Refoundation Party early in her tenure on 6 June 2006, and served on the Italian Parliament's XIV Commission (politics of the EU) from 6 June 2006 to her last day in office, 28 April 2008.
