= Opinion polling for the 2006 Italian general election =

In the years running up to the 2006 Italian general election, various organisations carried out opinion polls to gauge voting intention in Italy. Results of such polls are given in this article. Poll results are reported at the dates when the fieldwork was done, as opposed to the date of publication; if such date is unknown, the date of publication is given instead. Under the Italian par condicio (equal conditions) law, publication of opinion polls is forbidden in the last two weeks of an electoral campaign.

== Coalition vote ==
=== 2006 ===
Date	Polling firm	CdL	Unione	Others	Lead
9–10 Apr	Election results	49.7	49.8	0.5	0.1
23 Mar	Euromedia	45.5	52.4	2.1	6.9
21–22 Mar	IPR	47.0	52.0	1.0	5.0
10 Jan–22 Mar	Brunikmedia	46.7	53.0	0.3	6.3
20–21 Mar	TNS	48.0	51.5	0.5	3.5
20 Mar	Ekma	46.5	52.5	1.0	6.0
6 Jan–20 Mar	Brunikmedia	46.5	53.3	0.2	6.7
16 Mar	IPR	47.7	52.0	0.3	4.3
15–16 Mar	Eurisko	46.7	52.0	1.3	5.3
13 Mar	TNS	48.0	51.5	0.5	3.5
13 Mar	Eurisko	46.3	53.0	0.7	6.7
12 Mar	Brunikmedia	46.5	52.9	0.6	6.3
10–11 Mar	IPR	47.7	52.0	0.3	4.3
9–10 Mar	SWG	47.9	49.7	2.4	1.8
6–7 Mar	IPR	47.5	52.5	0.3	5.0
6–7 Mar	TNS	47.5	51.0	1.5	3.5
6–7 Mar	Lorien	48.1	51.1	0.8	3.0
6 Mar	Brunikmedia	46.7	52.7	0.6	6.0
20 Feb–5 Mar	Eurisko	46.5	51.0	2.5	4.5
3 Mar	SWG	47.0	52.0	1.0	5.0
28 Feb–3 Mar	PSB	48.8	48.3	2.9	0.5
27 Feb–1 Mar	Eurisko	46.4	51.4	2.2	5.0
27–28 Feb	IPR	47.3	52.5	0.5	4.6
27–28 Feb	TNS	47.0	51.5	1.5	5.2
27 Feb	Ekma	47.2	51.8	1.0	4.6
23–24 Feb	SWG	47.2	51.8	1.0	4.6
20–21 Feb	TNS	47.0	51.5	1.5	4.5
20 Feb	Emka	47.0	51.2	1.8	4.2
14–15 Feb	Eurisko	46.8	51.1	2.1	4.3
10 Feb	SWG	47.2	49.1	3.7	1.9
13–14 Feb	TNS	47.0	51.0	2.0	4.0
13–14 Feb	IPR	47.5	52.0	0.5	4.6
13 Feb	Ekma	47.5	51.5	1.0	4.0
9–10 Feb	ISPO	47.5	51.5	1.0	4.0
7–9 Feb	PSB	48.0	48.0	4.0	Tie
6–7 Feb	IPR	47.0	52.0	1.0	5.0
6–7 Feb	TNS	46.5	51.0	2.5	4.5
6 Feb	Ekma	46.5	52.5	1.0	6.0
3–4 Feb	SWG	46.6	51.2	2.2	4.6
30–31 Jan	TNS	46.0	51.0	3.0	5.0
30–31 Jan	IPR	47.2	52.2	0.6	5.0
27–28 Jan	SWG	46.2	51.4	2.4	5.2
25–26 Jan	ISPO	47.0	51.5	1.5	4.5
24–25 Jan	IPR	47.0	52.5	0.5	5.5
23–24 Jan	ISPO	45.5	51.0	3.5	5.5
23 Jan	Ekma	47.0	52.6	0.4	5.6
21–22 Jan	SWG	45.7	51.2	3.1	5.5
16–18 Jan	Eurisko	45.9	52.1	2.0	6.2
16–17 Jan	TNS	46.0	50.5	3.5	4.5
16–17 Jan	IPR	46.0	52.0	2.0	6.0
16 Jan	SWG	46.0	50.7	3.4	4.7
10–11 Jan	TNS	46.0	51.0	3.0	5.0
9–10 Jan	IPR	46.0	52.0	2.0	6.0

=== 2005 ===
Date	Polling firm	CdL	Unione	Others	Lead
1–18 Dec	SWG	44.9	52.2	2.9	7.3
9–11 Dec	IPR	44.9	52.8	2.3	7.9
1–2 Dec	Ekma	45.0	53.2	1.8	8.3
24–25 Nov	Ekma	44.8	52.5	1.4	7.7
18 Nov	SWG	45.5	52.5	2.0	7.0
4–6 Nov	IPR	44.5	52.5	3.0	8.0
2–3 Nov	Ekma	45.0	51.5	3.5	6.5
25 Oct	IPR	45.0	50.0	3.0	7.0
5–7 Oct	Dinamiche	43.9	51.7	4.4	7.8
13–15 Sep	Eurisko	43.2	50.8	6.1	7.6
13 Sep	IPR	45.0	50.0	5.0	5.0
25 Aug	SWG	41.5	51.0	7.5	9.5
27 Jun–5 Aug	Piepoli	47.0	49.5	3.5	2.5
7–13 Jun	Eurisko	40.7	57.0	2.3	16.3
1–3 Jun	Ekma	45.5	47.5	7.0	2.0
16–19 May	Eurisko	42.5	51.6	5.9	9.1
2–3 May	Ekma	45.5	49.0	5.5	3.5
28 Feb	Piepoli	46.0	48.0	6.0	2.0
18–20 Jan	Eurisko	45.5	48.4	6.1	2.9
