= Salvatore Raiti =

Italian politician

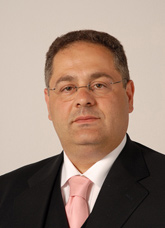
Salvatore Raiti

Salvatore Raiti (born 11 January 1965) is an Italian politician.

Born in Catania, he was elected to the Chamber of Deputies in the 2006 Italian general election while affiliated with the Italy of Values party. In the midst of his single parliamentary term, Raiti joined the Democratic Party in September 2007.
