= United Consumers =

Italian political party

The United Consumers (Consumatori Uniti) was a political party in Italy led by Bruno De Vita.

In the 2006 general election the party was affiliated to The Union, the centre-left coalition led by Romano Prodi. The United Consumers contested the election with the Federation of the Greens and the Party of Italian Communists (PdCI) for the Italian Senate in a joint list called Together with the Union, winning 11 seats together.

== History ==
In October 2006 Senator Fernando Rossi, splinter from the Party of Italian Communists, joined the party, but in September 2007 he left it to form his own Citizens' Political Movement. In the same month the party was merged into the Democratic Union for Consumers of Willer Bordon.

Subsequently the United Consumers formed a joint list known as Anticapitalist and Communist List with the PdCI, the Communist Refoundation Party and Socialism 2000 for the 2009 European Parliament election.
