= Consumers' List =

Defunct political party in Italy

Consumers' List Lista Consumatori
- Leader: Carlo Rienzi
- Founded: 2004
- Ideology: Consumer protection
- Political position: Centre
- National affiliation: The Union (2006)

The Consumers' List (Italian: Lista Consumatori) was a political party in Italy.

== History ==
The party was founded in 2004 by Carlo Rienzi, President of the Codacons association (Coordination of associations for environmental protection and user and consumer rights).

In the 2004 EP election the party got only 0.5% of the vote, without gaining any seats.

In the 2006 general election the party was affiliated to The Union (L'Unione), the centre-left coalition led by Romano Prodi. It got 0.2% of the vote, but thanks to its result in Calabria (5.3% of the vote) it gained one seat in the Senate (Pietro Fuda of the Southern Democratic Party).
