= Marina Sereni =

Italian politician (born 1960)

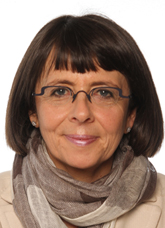

Vice-President of the Chamber of Deputies
- In office 21 March 2013 – 23 March 2018
- President: Laura Boldrini

Vice-President of the Democratic Party
- In office 7 November 2009 – 15 December 2013 Serving with Ivan Scalfarotto
- Preceded by: None
- Succeeded by: Matteo Ricci; Sandra Zampa

Member of the Chamber of Deputies
- In office 30 May 2001 – 22 March 2018
- Constituency: Umbria

Personal details
- Born: 9 May 1960 (age 65) Foligno, Italy
- Party: Democratic Party (since 2007)
- Other political affiliations: PCI (before 1991); PDS (1991–1998); DS (1998–2007)
- Profession: Politician

Marina Sereni (born 8 May 1960) is an Italian politician of the Democratic Party (PD) who has been serving as deputy minister of foreign affairs in the governments of prime ministers Giuseppe Conte and Mario Draghi since 2019.

Sereni served as the vice president of the PD and vice president of the Chamber of Deputies from 2013 to 2018.

== Early life and education ==
Sereni was born in Foligno in 1960 to Joseph and Ines Sereni, both of whom worked on the railways. She graduated from the "Federico Frezzi Foligno" School and then moved to Perugia. She did not attend any university course.

== Political career ==
=== Early beginnings ===
Sereni enrolled in the Italian Communist Youth Federation (FGCI) in 1974, and later joined the Communist Party. Following this she entered the Democratic Party of the Left, and subsequently the Democrats of the Left. She became the Head of Budget, Economic Planning and Social Policy in 1993 and was elected in the constituency of Umbria in 2001.

=== Member of the Italian Parliament, 2001–present ===
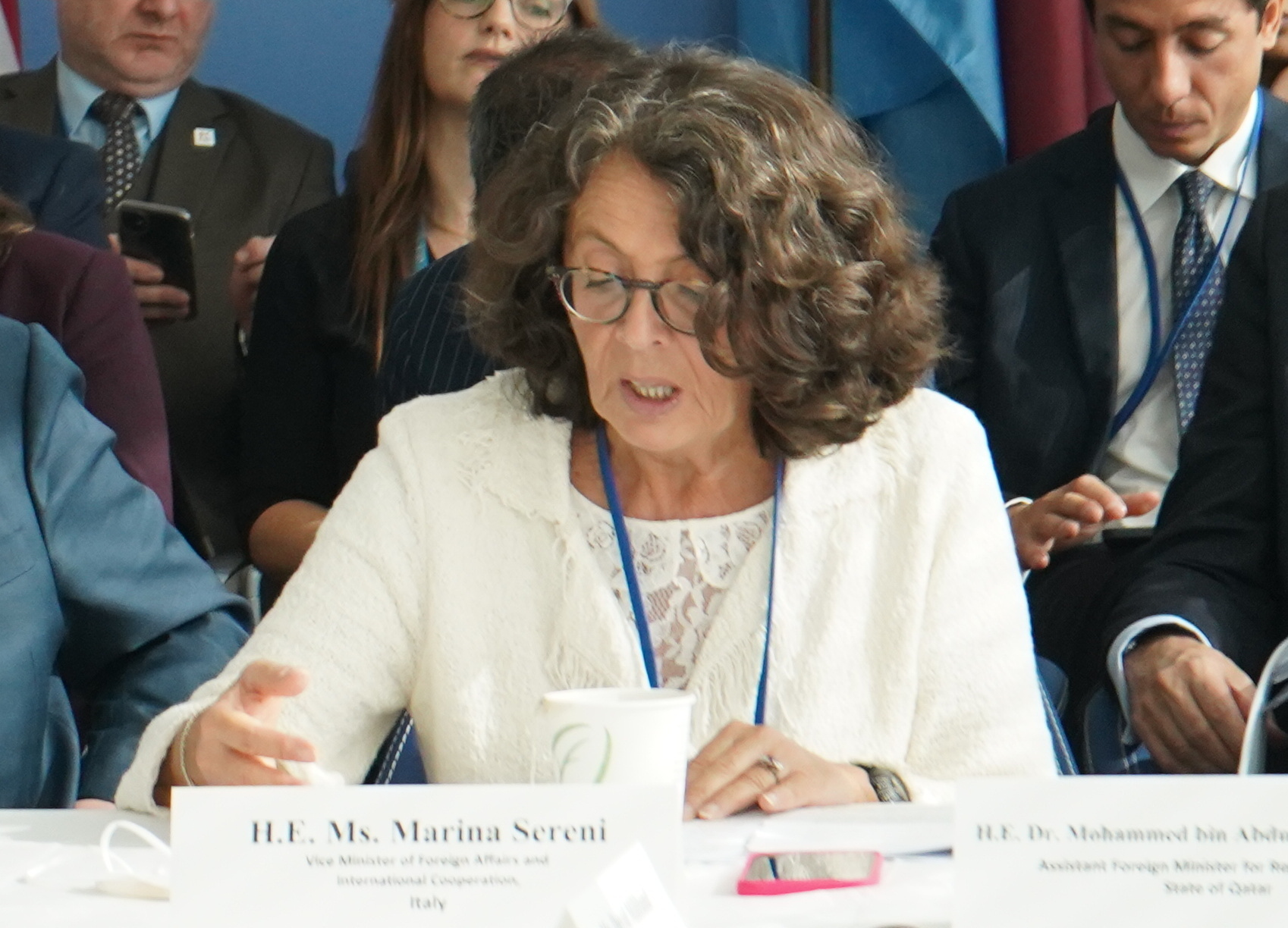
Sereni in 2022

In the 2001 elections, Sereni was elected to the Chamber of Deputies in the single-member constituency of Foligno, for the center-left coalition. Since December 2001, she has been a member of the national secretariat of the DS, at first with foreign law enforcement officer and later as head of the organization.

Sereni was confirmed in 2006 election, a candidate in the constituency in the list of the Olive Tree in Umbria. In the XV Legislature, she served on the Defence Committee and as deputy chair of the Chamber of Deputies. From 23 May 2007, she was one of 45 members of the DS National Committee, which brought together the leaders of the party's future members. Among the constituents of the Democratic Party, elected in the primary elections of October 14, 2007, is now part of the Commission's Statute of PD. She was re-elected to the Chamber in the 2008 election. From 7 November 2009 to 15 December 2013 she was vice president of the Democratic Party, along with Ivan Scalfarotto.

Engagement in the Chamber of Deputies as a candidate of the Democratic Party in the constituency list Umbria in view of the Italian election of 2013 in which she was re-elected deputy. On 21 March 2013 she was elected vice-president of the Chamber of Deputies.

In parliament, Sereni later served on the Committee on Foreign and European Affairs as well as on the parliamentary security commission, the body which provides parliamentary supervision of Italian intelligence agencies. By 2014, she was considered by international news media a leading candidate to replace Federica Mogherini as Minister of Foreign Affairs in the government of Prime Minister Matteo Renzi.

=== Deputy minister of foreign affairs, 2019–present ===
In September 2019, Sereni was appointed deputy minister at the Ministry of Foreign Affairs and International Cooperation, serving under minister Luigi Di Maio.
