= Third Pole (Italy) =

Former political party in Italy

Third Pole (Italian: Terzo Polo), whose complete name was Federation of the Centre – Third Pole (Federazione di Centro – Terzo Polo), was a small Christian-democratic political party in Italy, based in Southern Italy especially in Abruzzo. Its leaders were Vincenzo Scotti (secretary), former Italian Minister of the Interior for Christian Democracy, and Nino Cristofori (president).

The party contested the 2006 Italian general election as The Centre – Third Pole (Il Centro – Terzo Polo), independently from the two major coalitions. In 2007, the party counted four regional councillors: Giorgio De Matteis and Claudio Di Bartolomeo (Abruzzo), Antonio Milo (Campania), and Antonio Flovilla (Basilicata). In January 2008, the party formed a political pact with Raffaele Lombardo's Movement for Autonomy (MpA), whose power base was in Sicily. The plan was to create a network of regionalist Christian-democratic parties.

After the 2008 Italian general election, Scotti was appointed Undersecretary of Foreign Affairs in Berlusconi IV Cabinet and later also president of the MpA. In the 2008 Abruzzo regional election the MpA won 3.3 of the vote and De Matteis was re-elected regional deputy.

== See also ==
- List of political parties in Italy
