= Ricardo Merlo =

Italian politician and journalist (b. 1962)

Ricardo Antonio Merlo
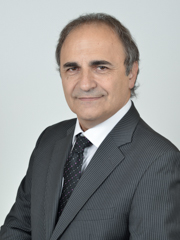

Member of the Senate
- In office 23 March 2018 – 13 October 2022
- Constituency: South America

Member of the Chamber of Deputies
- In office 28 April 2006 – 22 March 2018
- Constituency: South America

Personal details
- Born: 25 May 1962 (age 64) Buenos Aires, Argentina
- Party: AISA (until 2007); MAIE (since 2007)
- Education: Universidad del Salvador
- Profession: Politician, journalist

Ricardo Antonio Merlo (born 25 May 1962 in Buenos Aires) is an Italian politician, leader of the Associative Movement Italians Abroad. Born and resident in Argentina, he acquired Italian citizenship through Jus sanguinis.

== Biography ==
Graduated in Political Science at the University of Salvador in Buenos Aires, Ricardo Antonio Merlo completed his studies in Italy at the University of Padua.

Between 1998 and 2003, he was elected member of the General Council of Italians Abroad in Buenos Aires and then, in 2004, he was elected president of COMITES in Buenos Aires. In 2005, he served as president of the Intercomites Argentina.

In the Italian general election of 2006 he was elected deputy for the first time in the foreign constituency of the Chamber with the Italian Associations in South America (AISA), a political movement founded by Luigi Pallaro in 2005.

In 2007 he founded the Associative Movement Italians Abroad (MAIE), through which he was re-elected deputy in the general elections of 2008 and 2013. In the general election of 2018 he was elected senator and voted the confidence to the Conte Cabinet, so on 12 June 2018 he was appointed Undersecretary of the Ministry of Foreign Affairs and International Cooperation.

== Honours and awards ==
- Sweden: Commander Grand Cross of the Order of the Polar Star (13 November 2018)
