= The Other Sicily =

The Other Sicily (L'Altra Sicilia) is an association primarily involved in assisting Sicilian emigrants.

It is based in Brussels (Belgium), from where it publishes a bimonthly named L'Isola, and its founder and president is Francesco Paolo Catania.

In the run-up of the 2006 general election the association teamed up with the For the South party and finally participated to the election under "The Other Sicily – For the South" banner in the "Europe" constituency for Italians abroad. The list received 2.1% of the vote in the constituency.

The association strongly defends Sicilian identity and autonomy, while frequently criticising the region's President, Rosario Crocetta.
