= United Pensioners =

United Pensioners Pensionati Uniti
- President: Filippo De Jorio
- Founded: 17 January 2000
- Ideology: Pensioners' interests
- National affiliation: House of Freedoms (2006)

Website
- http://www.filippodejorio.it/

The United Pensioners of Italy (Italian: Pensionati Uniti), whose complete name is Italian Federation United Pensioners (Italian: Federazione Italiana Pensionati Uniti, F.I.P.U.), is a political party in Italy. The party was affiliated to the "House of Freedoms", the centre-right coalition led by Silvio Berlusconi, in the 2006 general election.

In 2006, after the fusion with the Pensioners' Movement (Movimento Pensionati), led by Roberto Olivato, the party has changed its name into United Pensioners – Pensioners' Movement (Pensionati Uniti – Movimento Pensionati).
