= Pensioners' Party (Italy) =

Pensioners' Party Partito Pensionati
- Secretary: Carlo Fatuzzo
- President: Giacinto Boldrini
- Founded: 19 October 1987
- Split from: Pensioners' National Party
- Headquarters: Piazza Risorgimento, 14 Bergamo
- Ideology: Pensioners' interests Single issue politics Conservatism (since 2021)
- National affiliation: The Union (2005–2007); House of Freedoms (2007–2008); The People of Freedom (2008–2013); Centre-right coalition (2013–2022)
- European affiliation: European Democrats
- Chamber of Deputies: 0 / 400
- Senate: 0 / 200
- European Parliament: 0 / 76
- Regional Councils: 0 / 896

Website
- www.partitopensionati.it

The Pensioners' Party (Partito Pensionati, PP) is a centrist Italian political party, whose aim is to represent the interests of pensioners.

== History ==
The Pensioners' Party was founded in 1987 in Milan, and its current leader is Carlo Fatuzzo.

In the 2004 European Parliament election, it gained 1.1% of the national vote and elected its leader to the European Parliament, where he sits in the European People's Party–European Democrats group.

On 4 February 2006, the party joined The Union, the centre-left coalition led by Romano Prodi, and was decisive in the result of the 2006 general election (the PP scored 0.9% and the centre-left won by a 0.1% margin), but soon after the election the alliance with the centre-left turned cold and tense. In the European Parliament, Antonio Tajani (Forza Italia, Vice President of the European People's Party), tried successfully to convince Fatuzzo to return to the centre-right coalition.

Finally, on 20 November 2006, Carlo Fatuzzo, in a press conference along with Antonio Tajani and Fabrizio Cicchitto (national deputy-coordinator of Forza Italia), announced that its party was re-joining the centre-right House of Freedoms coalition.

In the 2008 general election the Pensioners' Party presented its candidates into The People of Freedom, but it didn't gained any seat.

In the 2009 European Parliament election, the party ran as part of The Autonomy, an electoral coalition including The Right, the Movement for the Autonomies and the Alliance of the Centre.

In 2012 the party enters for the first time in the Italian Parliament with one deputy, Lino Miserotti, who replaces the outgoing deputy Marco Airaghi, and with one senator, Giacinto Boldrini, who replaces the deceased senator Gianpiero Carlo Cantoni.

In the 2013 general election the Pensioners' Party ran with the Centre-right coalition, getting only the 0.16% of the vote for the Chamber and the 0.40% for the Senate.

In the 2018 general election the party signed a cooperation Agreement with Forza Italia and some members of the party were candidate in FI's lists, including party's secretary Carlo Fatuzzo, who was elected in the Chamber of Deputies.

== Electoral results ==
=== Italian Parliament ===
Election	Leader	Chamber of Deputies				Senate of the Republic			
Election	Leader	Votes	%	Seats	+/–	Votes	%	Seats	+/–
1992	Carlo Fatuzzo	220,509	0.56	0 / 630	New	215,889	0.65	0 / 315	New
1994	Carlo Fatuzzo	15,671	0.04	0 / 630	0	250,637	0.76	0 / 315	0
1996	Carlo Fatuzzo	Did not compete				60,640	0.19	0 / 315	0
2001	Carlo Fatuzzo	68,439	0.18	0 / 630	0	78,572	0.23	0 / 315	0
2006	Carlo Fatuzzo	333,278	0.87	0 / 630	0	340,565	1.00	0 / 315	0
2008	Carlo Fatuzzo	Into PdL		0 / 630 (Note: In 2012, the exponent of the Pensioners' Party Lino Miserotti replaces the outgoing deputy Marco Airaghi.)	0	Into PdL		0 / 315 (Note: In 2012, the exponent of the Pensioners' Party Giacinto Boldrini replaces the deceased senator Gianpiero Carlo Cantoni.)	0
2013	Carlo Fatuzzo	54,854	0.16	0 / 630	0	123,457	0.40	0 / 315	0
2018	Carlo Fatuzzo	Into FI		1 / 630	▲1	Did not compete			

=== European Parliament ===
Election	Leader	Votes	%	Seats	+/–	EP Group
1989	Carlo Fatuzzo	162,293	0.47	0 / 81	New	–
1999	Carlo Fatuzzo	233,874	0.75	1 / 87	▲1	EPP-ED
2004	Carlo Fatuzzo	374,343	1.15	1 / 78	0	EPP-ED
2009	Carlo Fatuzzo	Into The Autonomy		0 / 72	0	–
2019	Carlo Fatuzzo	Into FI		0 / 76	0	–

=== Regional Councils ===
Region	Latest election	# of overall votes	% of overall vote	# of overall seats won
Abruzzo	2014	—N/a	—N/a	0 / 31
Aosta Valley	2013	—N/a	—N/a	0 / 35
Apulia	2015	—N/a	—N/a	0 / 51
Basilicata	2013	—N/a	—N/a	0 / 21
Calabria	2014	—N/a	—N/a	0 / 30
Campania	2015	—N/a	—N/a	0 / 51
Emilia-Romagna	2014	—N/a	—N/a	0 / 50
Friuli-Venezia Giulia	2013	3,741 (#13)	0.9	0 / 49
Lazio	2013	—N/a	—N/a	0 / 50
Liguria	2015	—N/a	—N/a	0 / 50
Lombardy	2018	20,259 (#13)	0.38	0 / 80
Marche	2015	—N/a	—N/a	0 / 31
Molise	2013	—N/a	—N/a	0 / 21
Piedmont	2014	13,837 (#12)	0.7	0 / 50
Sardinia	2014	—N/a	—N/a	0 / 60
Sicily	2012	—N/a	—N/a	0 / 90
Tuscany	2015	—N/a	—N/a	0 / 41
Trentino-Alto Adige	2013	—N/a	—N/a	0 / 70
Umbria	2015	—N/a	—N/a	0 / 20
Veneto	2015	14,625 (#14)	0.8	0 / 51
