= S.O.S. Italy =

S.O.S. Italy S.O.S. Italia
- Leader: Diego Volpe Pasini
- Founded: 1996
- Dissolved: c.2012
- Headquarters: Udine
- Ideology: Right-wing populism Consumer protection
- Political position: Centre-right

S.O.S. Italy (Italian: S.O.S. Italia) was an Italian political party led by the Udinese businessman Diego Volpe Pasini.

The party was founded in 1996 with the aim of protecting the rights of consumers and defending the traditions of Western civilization.

In the 2006 general election the party, affiliated to the House of Freedoms, got only 0.02% of the vote for the Chamber and 0.01% of the vote for the Senate.

In the 2008 Italian local election Pasini was elected municipal councilor of Udine with 4.86% of the vote (SOS Italy, instead, scored 1.82% of the vote) but he was raised by the office on 22 November 2008, after being arrested following a conviction for infringement of family assistance obligations.

The party continued its activities until 2012, when Pasini finally joined Moderates in Revolution.
