= Giuseppe Caminiti =

Italian politician (1935–2025)

Portrait of Caminiti c. 2001

Giuseppe Caminiti (19 May 1935 – 15 July 2025) was an Italian physician and politician.

== Life and career ==
Caminiti, a native of Villa San Giovanni, was born on 19 May 1935. He pursued medical studies and was seated in the Chamber of Deputies during the XIV Legislature, representing Forza Italia. Caminiti died on 15 July 2025, at the age of 90.
