= Together with the Union =

Together with the Union Insieme con L'Unione
- Founded: 2006
- Political position: Left-wing
- National affiliation: The Union

Together with the Union (Insieme con L'Unione) was an electoral alliance in Italy that contested seats in the senate for the 2006 general election. The alliance consisted of:

- Federation of the Greens (Federazione dei Verdi)
- Party of Italian Communists (Partito dei Comunisti Italiani)
- United Consumers (Consumatori Uniti)

The alliance received 4.09% of the votes and 11 seats in the senate. It contested in the election as part of The Union.
