= Democratic Union for Consumers =

Democratic Union for Consumers Unione Democratica per i Consumatori
- President: Willer Bordon
- Secretary: Bruno De Vita
- Coordinator: Roberto Manzione
- Founded: 11 September 2007
- Dissolved: 2017 (de facto)
- Ideology: Populism

Website
- http://www.udconsumatori.it/

Democratic Union for Consumers (Italian: Unione Democratica per i Consumatori, UDpC) was a centrist Italian political party. The party supports consumer protection and trade union rights.

== History ==
UD was founded on 11 September 2007 by two dissenting members of Democracy is Freedom – The Daisy (DL) who were opposed to the foundation of the Democratic Party (PD). Willer Bordon (leader of the new party) and Roberto Manzione, and two leading consumer rights leaders, Elio Lanutti and Bruno De Vita, leader of United Consumers, were integrated in the new party. Bordon and Manzione were both members of the most Ulivista faction in DL, that one led by Arturo Parisi and decided to leave DL because in their opinion, PD was born as a bureaucratic union of apparatuses between DL and the Democrats of the Left and they were the "true Democrats".

Bordon had been a strong supporter of the idea of a "Democratic Party" since 1992, when he left the Democratic Party of the Left to form Democratic Alliance, forerunner of the first Democratic Union, The Democrats and Democracy is Freedom – The Daisy, respectively. All four parties were committed in uniting the whole Italian centre-left into a single party and Bordon was a keen supporter of this.

On 27 November 2007 UD formed a joint group in the Senate with Liberal Democrats of Lamberto Dini. The convergence between the two small parties, which retained their autonomy, is based on some key points (a plurality voting system, more powers for the prime minister, fiscal conservatism, tax cuts and social security reform) and was open to all the senators.

Both Bordon and Manzione, as also Dini and D'Amico, have a long record of dissenting votes from the majority. The group was predicted as likely to have much influence in the Senate, where the centre-left had only a narrow majority of two votes and where Liberal Democrats were the fourth force of the coalition, after the Democratic Party, the Communist Refoundation Party and Democratic Left. For technical reasons, the two parties formed separate groups in the Senate in order to have more speaking time, whilst coordinating almost every position together and formed a joint group until the Liberal Democrats decided to withdraw support from Romano Prodi's government and to join The People of Freedom.

In the 2008 general election, Democratic Union for Consumers failed to gain enough votes to enter Parliament.

On 30 December 2017, the secretary Bruno de Vita died, and the party has effectively ceased its activities.

== Leadership ==
- President: Willer Bordon (2007–2015)
- Coordinator: Roberto Manzione (2007–present)
