= Francesco Caruso =

American soccer player

Frank Caruso
Personal information
- Full name: Frencesco Caruso
- Date of birth: July 16, 1982 (age 44)
- Place of birth: Allentown, Pennsylvania, U.S.
- Height: 6 ft 0 in (1.83 m)
- Position: Striker

Youth career
- 2002–2003: San Diego Mesa College
- 2004: San Diego State University

Senior career*
Years	Team	Apps	(Gls)
2005–2006	Otago United	?	(7)
2006	Harrisburg City Islanders	8	(2)
- * Club domestic league appearances and goals as of December 5, 2006

Francesco Caruso (born July 16, 1982, in Allentown, Pennsylvania) is an American soccer player who last played for USL Second Division side Harrisburg City Islanders.

Caruso grew up in Pennsylvania, and attended Lancaster Catholic High School. He then attended San Diego Mesa College, where he played soccer in 2002 and 2003, before transferring to San Diego State University. Caruso then played for Otago United in the New Zealand Football Championship. In 2006, he returned to the United States and signed with the Harrisburg City Islanders.
