= Ivan Scalfarotto =

Italian politician and LGBT activist (born 1965)

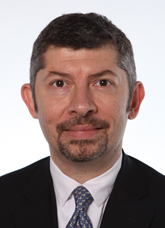

Member of the Senate of the Republic
- Incumbent
- Assumed office 13 October 2022
- Constituency: Piedmont

Member of the Chamber of Deputies
- In office 15 March 2013 – 13 October 2022
- Constituency: Apulia (2013-2018); Lombardy 1 (2018-2022)

Personal details
- Born: 16 August 1965 (age 61) Pescara, Italy
- Party: FdV (1990–1995); DS (1998–2007); PD (2007–2019); IV (since 2019)
- Education: University of Naples Federico II
- Profession: Politician

Ivan Scalfarotto (born 16 August 1965) is an Italian politician and activist, committed to LGBT rights. A member of the Italian Parliament, he was a Deputy Minister at the Italian Ministry of Interior.

Previously a Deputy Minister at the Ministry of Constitutional Reforms (2014–2016), the Ministry of Economic development (2016–2018) where he was in charge of international trade, and the Ministry of Foreign Affairs and International Cooperation (2019–2021), in 2005 Scalfarotto ran to become the national leader of The Union, the centre-left coalition, in the primary elections that were held to identify their candidate to lead the Italian Government. Between 2009 and 2013 he was a Deputy Chairperson of the Democratic Party. In the 2013 and 2018 general elections he was elected to the Italian Parliament (Chamber of Deputies). In September 2019 he abandoned the Democratic Party to join Italia Viva, former PM Matteo Renzi's newly created political movement.

In 2015 and 2016 he was enlisted, the only Italian national, as one of the Top 50 Diversity Figures in Public Life within the "Global Diversity List".

== Biography ==
Before starting his political activity, Scalfarotto had an international career at Citi, the Global American Financial Conglomerate. Hired in Milan as the Country HR Head for Italy in 1998, in 2002 he moved to London where he ran the Capital Markets HR Department for EMEA. In 2005 he moved to Moscow to manage the Russia & CIS HR Department, covering Russia, Ukraine and Kazakhstan. At the beginning of 2009 he left Citi to go back to Italy to pursue his political career.

In 2010, upon his return to Italy, Scalfarotto funded "Parks – Liberi e Uguali", a not for profit organization of Italian corporations and Italian subsidiaries of international companies, committed to offer equal opportunities to their LGBTQ employees. After joining the Italian Government, he resigned all executive positions at "Parks" where he is now founder and honorary president.

In 2003, when Scalfarotto was working and living in London, he founded the first foreign local club of "Libertà e Giustizia" (Freedom and Justice), a grassroot political organization in the centre-left area, and two years later he stood for election at the primaries held by The Union, the centre-left coalition seeking to identify their candidate for prime minister at the upcoming 2006 general elections. Scalfarotto, an absolute outsider, placed sixth, collecting 26,912 votes (0.6% of the vote), behind famous and established politicians such as Romano Prodi, who eventually was the candidate Prime Minister for the coalition, Fausto Bertinotti, Clemente Mastella, Antonio Di Pietro and Alfonso Pecoraro Scanio.

Among the ideas that inspired his campaign, it is worth to mention personal merit in public administration and politics, fight against "gerontocracy" in the Italian politics and support of secularism. An openly gay man, he was one of the first open supporters of same sex marriage and adoption of children by homosexual couples in the public arena.

On 18 June 2007, Scalfarotto announced that he would be joining the newly created Democratic Party, in support of Walter Veltroni's candidacy to be the new party's leader. Together with other people in their thirties and early forties - including Marco Simoni, a university professor from the London School of Economics, the journalist Luca Sofri, and astrophysicist Sandra Savaglio form the Max Planck Institute in Munich - he founded a group called iMille, with the aim of renewing the ruling class of the Italian centre-left.

Elected to the Party National Assembly, he was a member of the committee in charge of writing the party bylaws. In 2009 he was elected the Deputy Chairperson of the Democratic Party, along with Marina Sereni, an office he covered until 2013.

On 25 September 2012, he announced he would be supporting Matteo Renzi in his bid to become the leader of the party.

In 2013 he was elected an MP at the Chamber of Deputies. In 2014, when Matteo Renzi became Prime Minister, Scalfarotto was appointed Deputy Minister for Constitutional Reforms. In 2016 he moved to the Ministry of Economic Development where, again as a Deputy Minister, he was given a portfolio of responsibility including International Trade and Investment Attraction. In this capacity, also after Paolo Gentiloni took over the PM position from Matteo Renzi, he represented Italy at all major International Fora, including the EU Trade Council, G7, G20, OECD and the WTO.

In September 2019, with the creation of the new Government led by Giuseppe Conte, Scalfarotto is made a Deputy Minister at the Ministry of Foreign Affairs, in charge of Trade Policies and bilateral relations with European (EU and non-EU) Countries.

In 2019 Scalfarotto left the Democratic Party to join Italia Viva, the new political movement created by former PM Matteo Renzi and in 2020 he was a candidate to the 2020 Apulian regional election competing against the two candidates from the major political coalitions. He collected 1.60% of the total vote.

On January 13, 2021, Italia Viva withdrew its confidence in the Government and Scalfarotto, together with the two Ministers from the Party, Teresa Bellanova and Elena Bonetti, resigned from his post. The resignation of the three officials led to the collapse of the Cabinet and to the subsequent creation of a new Government led by former ECB President Mario Draghi where Scalfarotto was appointed a Deputy Minister at the Minister of Interior.

== Personal life ==
On May 20, 2017, in Milan, at the Palazzo Reale, Scalfarotto – the first member of an Italian government - entered into a civil union with his partner Federico Lazzarovich.
