= Southern Democratic Party =

The Southern Democratic Party (Italian: Partito Democratico Meridionale, PDM) was a centrist political party in Italy based in Calabria.

The Southern Democratic Party was founded in 2006, as a split from the regional organisation of Democracy is Freedom – The Daisy. The PDM's leader was Agazio Loiero, President of Calabria Region since 2005. The Southern Democrats were strong supporters of constructing the Democratic Party in order to unite the Italian centre-left, despite PDM's members being mostly moderate conservatives.

In the 2006 general election, thanks to a political pact with the Consumers' List, PDM scored 5.3% and elected a Senator, Pietro Fuda (former President of Province of Reggio Calabria for Forza Italia).

On 19 March 2007, Eva Catizone, formerly of the Italian Socialist Party and former mayor of Cosenza for the Democrats of the Left, was elected leader of the party.

In the subsequent municipal elections, PDM scored 13.7% in Catanzaro, 6.5% in Crotone and 4.2% in Cosenza.

The PDM joined the Democratic Party at its founding congress on 14 October 2007.
