= Filippo Caminiti =

Italian politician

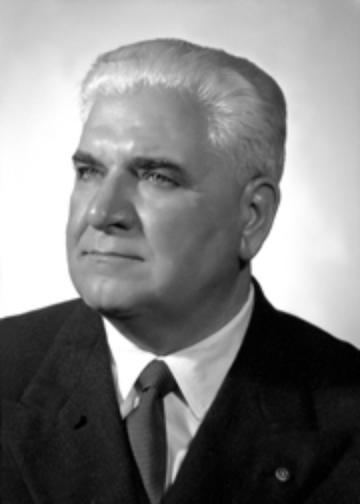
Senator Filippo Caminiti

Filippo Caminiti (5 March 1895 – 1955) was an Italian politician.

Caminiti was a native of Soverato, who sat in the Senate of the Republic during the I Legislature between 1948 and 1953.
