= Carlo Fatuzzo =

Italian politician (born 1944)

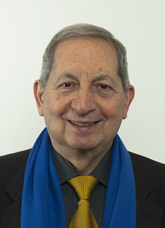

Member of the Chamber of Deputies
- Incumbent
- Assumed office 23 March 2018
- Constituency: Lombardy

Secretary of the Pensioners’ Party
- Incumbent
- Assumed office 1987

Member of the European Parliament
- In office 1999–2009

Personal details
- Party: Pensioners' Party

Carlo Fatuzzo (born 14 March 1944 in Genoa) is an Italian politician, leader of the Pensioners' Party.

His daughter Elisabetta, a lawyer, is also an exponent of the Pensioners' Party.

== Biography ==
In 1979 Fatuzzo founded the Christian Party of Social Action, that ran in the 1979 and 1983 italian general elections, limitedly in the Brescia-Bergamo constituency for the Chamber and in the Lombardy constituency for the Senate. After the poor election results obtained, Fatuzzo dissolved the party.

In the 1987 general election he was candidate for the Chamber among the ranks of the Venetian League (without being elected), while on 19 October 1987 he founded the Pensioners' Party.

Subsequently he was elected municipal and provincial councillor of Bergamo and regional councillor of Lombardy.

In the 1996 general election he was candidate for the Chamber in the constituency of Albino, with the support of the Pole for Freedoms, but he was not elected.

Fatuzzo he was elected MEP in the european election of 1999, and he was re-confirmed also in the 2004 election; he sat in the European People's Party–European Democrats group.

In the 2018 general election he has been elected MP among the ranks of Forza Italia.

== Political career ==
- since 1987: National Secretary of the Pensioners' Party
- Member of Bergamo City (1985-1990) and Provincial (1990-1995) Councils
- 1990-1995: Member of Lombardy Regional Council
- 2002-2004: Secretary of the European Association of Parties for the Protection of the Elderly
- 1999-2009: Member of the European Parliament
- since 2018: Member of the Chamber of Deputies (Italy)
