= Pietro Fuda =

Italian politician and engineer (born 1943)

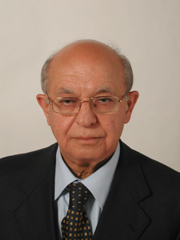

Senator of the Republic of Italy
- In office 28 April 2006 – 28 April 2008

President of the Province of Reggio Calabria
- In office 28 May 2002 – 30 November 2005
- Preceded by: Cosimo Antonio Calabrò
- Succeeded by: Giuseppe Morabito

Member of the Regional Council of Calabria
- In office 5 June 1995 – 5 April 2005

Mayor of Siderno
- In office 31 May 2015 – 9 August 2018

Personal details
- Born: 28 February 1943 (age 83) Siderno, Italy
- Party: Forza Italia (1995–2005); Southern Democratic Party (2006–2007); Democratic Party (2007–2013); Democratic Centre (since 2013)
- Occupation: Engineer

Pietro Fuda (born 28 February 1943) is an Italian engineer and politician who served as a senator of the Republic of Italy during the 15th Legislature from 2006 to 2008. He previously served as a member of the Regional Council of Calabria, regional assessor, president of the Province of Reggio Calabria, and later served as mayor of Siderno from 2015 to 2018.
