= Rose in the Fist =

Italian political party

Rose in the Fist Rosa nel Pugno
- Leader: Emma Bonino, Enrico Boselli
- Founded: 17 November 2005
- Dissolved: 18 December 2007
- Ideology: Social democracy Liberalism
- Political position: Centre-left
- National affiliation: The Union

Website
- http://www.rosanelpugno.it/

The Rose in the Fist (Italian: Rosa nel Pugno, RnP) was a political alliance of political parties in Italy and one of the main supporters of gay rights, abortion, and euthanasia in Italian politics. The RnP was part of the centre-left coalition, which at that time was known as The Union.

The RnP was composed of the Italian Democratic Socialists (SDI; a social-democratic party led by Enrico Boselli and Roberto Villetti), the Italian Radicals (RI; a liberal-libertarian party led by Marco Pannella and Emma Bonino), and some independent members gathered in the Association for the Rose in the Fist (including Lanfranco Turci, Salvatore Buglio, and Biagio De Giovanni).

== History ==
The federation was constituted in September 2005 during a convention held in Fiuggi, based on the political principles of José Luis Rodríguez Zapatero (excluding foreign policy, where the Radicals historically represented an Atlanticist and pro-American stance), Tony Blair, and Loris Fortuna. In November, its official definition was finally announced. Its symbol was the fist and rose, the emblem of the Socialist International (SI) and many socialist and social democratic parties around the world. It had been the historical logo of the Radical Party (PR) during the 1970s and the 1980s.

The RI component of the alliance created some friction with the more Catholic-inspired components of The Union, such as Democracy is Freedom – The Daisy (DL) and the Union of Democrats for Europe (UDEUR). The socialist component was made up mostly of veterans of the Italian Socialist Party (PSI). There was also the "third component", composed mainly by former Democrats of the Left (DS), such as Lanfranco Turci, Salvatore Buglio, and Biagio De Giovanni, who gathered in the Association for the Rose in the Fist. In the second Prodi government, the RnP was represented by Bonino, who served as Minister of European Affairs and International Trade. The alliance was disbanded in December 2007, upon which the SDI merged with the Association for the Rose in the Fist and other minor movements to form the 2007-founded Italian Socialist Party.

== Composition ==
Party	Ideology	Leader
Italian Radicals (RI)	Social liberalism	Emma Bonino
Italian Democratic Socialists (SDI)	Social democracy	Enrico Boselli

== Popular support ==
The federation presented its own lists for the 2006 Italian general election, obtaining 2.6% of votes, and winning 18 seats. Of these seats, 9 were for SDI, 7 for RI, one for Lanfranco Turci, and one for Salvatore Buglio in the Chamber of Deputies, with no seats in the Senate of the Republic. This was a disappointing result, considering that the RI alone scored 2.3% both at the 2001 Italian general election and at the 2004 European Parliament election in Italy, while the SDI had an electoral force of 2–3% in regional and local elections. In particular, it seems that the RI lost votes to Forza Italia (FI) in their Northern strongholds (such as Piedmont, Lombardy, Veneto, and Friuli-Venezia Giulia), while the SDI did the same in favour of The Olive Tree coalition in their Southern strongholds (such as Abruzzo, Campania, Apulia, Basilicata, and Calabria).

	RI 2004	SDI 2005	RI–SDI 2006
Piedmont	3.1	2.4	2.7
Lombardy	2.7	w. OliveTree	2.6
Veneto	2.8	w. OliveTree	2.3
Friuli VG	3.2	no election	2.7
Abruzzo	2.2	5.2	2.9
Campania	1.2	5.3	2.8
Apulia	1.7	4.0	3.1
Basilicata	1.5	w. OliveTree	3.8
Calabria	0.9	6.8	4.3

== Electoral results ==
=== Italian Parliament ===
Chamber of Deputies
Election year	No. of overall votes	% of overall vote	No. of overall seats won	+/–	Leader
2006	990,694 (7th)	2.6	18 / 630	–	Emma Bonino

Senate of the Republic
Election year	No. of overall votes	% of overall vote	No. of overall seats won	+/–	Leader
2006	851,604 (9th)	2.5	0 / 315	–	Emma Bonino
