= The Union (Italy) =

The Union L'Unione
- Leader: Romano Prodi
- Founded: 11 October 2004
- Dissolved: 8 February 2008
- Preceded by: The Olive Tree (1996 and 2001 general elections)
- Headquarters: Piazza SS. Apostoli, 55; Rome
- Political position: Centre-left
- Colours: Yellow (official); Red (customary)

The Union (Italian: L'Unione) was a heterogenous centre-left political and electoral alliance of political parties in Italy. The Union was the direct heir of The Olive Tree coalition which represented the centre-left in the 1996 and 2001 general elections. However, The Union also included parties of the radical left, which were not affiliated with The Olive Tree. The Union was led by Romano Prodi, Prime Minister of Italy from May 2006 to May 2008, and former President of the European Commission. Collapsing in the wake of the 2008 Italian political crisis, the alliance was succeeded by the current-day centre-left coalition.

== Parties ==
The parties which were part of the coalition for most of the time are:

| Party | Ideology | Leader |
|---|---|---|
| Democrats of the Left (DS) | Social democracy | Piero Fassino |
| Democracy is Freedom – The Daisy (DL) | Centrism | Francesco Rutelli |
| Communist Refoundation Party (PRC) | Communism | Fausto Bertinotti |
| Federation of the Greens (FdV) | Green politics | Alfonso Pecoraro Scanio |
| Party of Italian Communists (PdCI) | Communism | Oliviero Diliberto |
| Rose in the Fist (RnP) | Social liberalism | Emma Bonino |
| Italy of Values (IdV) | Populism | Antonio Di Pietro |
| Union of Democrats for Europe (UDEUR) | Christian democracy | Clemente Mastella |
| The Italian Socialists (SI) | Social democracy | Bobo Craxi |
| European Republican Movement (MRE) | Social liberalism | Luciana Sbarbati |
| League for Autonomy – Lombard Alliance (LAL) | Regionalism | Matteo Brivio |
| South Tyrolean People's Party (SVP) | Regionalism | Luis Durnwalder |
| Pensioners' Party (PP) | Pensioners' interests | Carlo Fatuzzo |

DS, DL and MRE contested elections as The Olive Tree federation. The Democratic Party (PD, social-democratic), a merger of DS and DL, replaced its predecessor parties as a member of The Union upon its foundation in October 2007, becoming the largest member party of the alliance. Also during that time, the SDI became the Socialist Party (PS).

== Primary elections ==
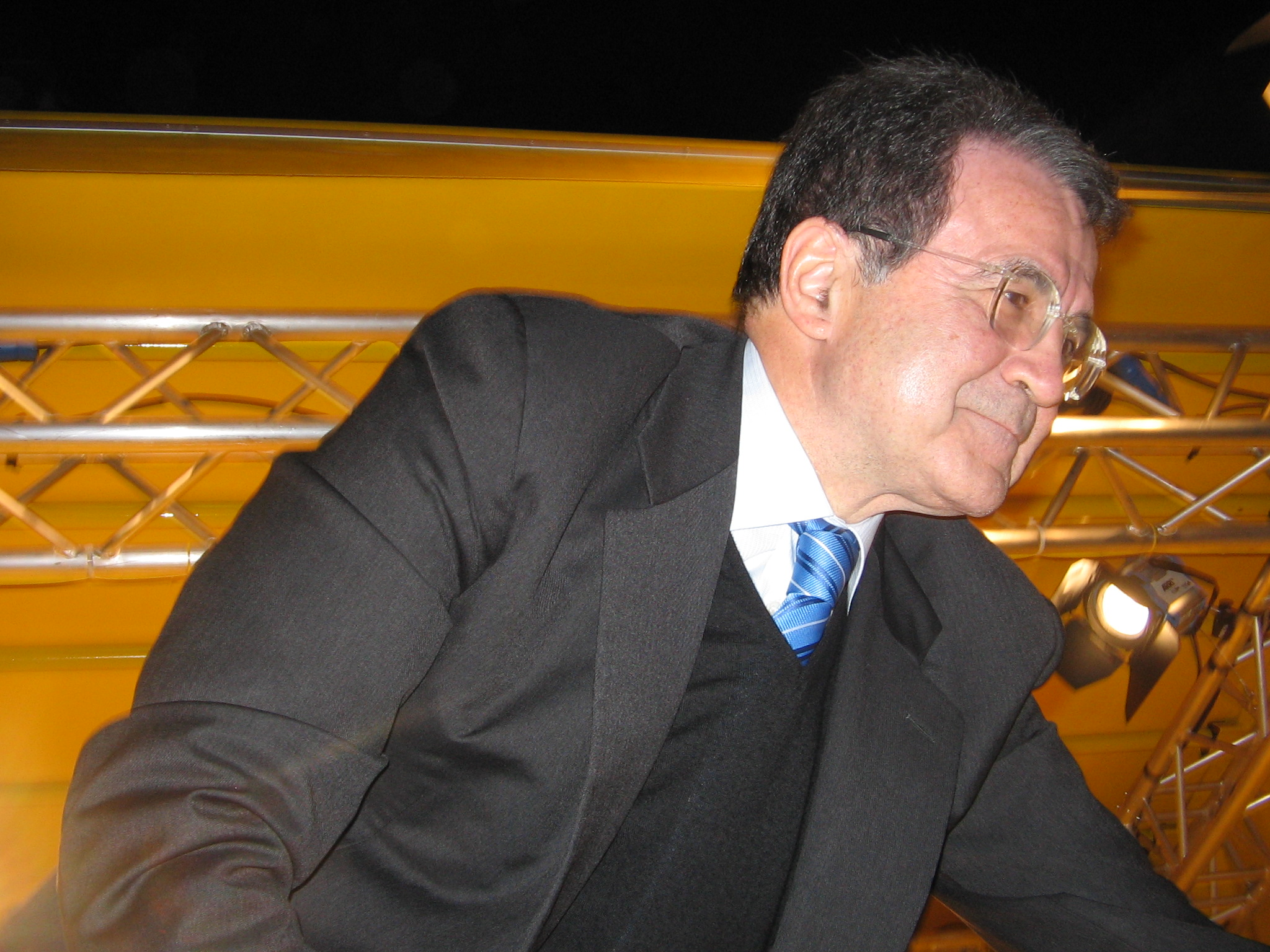
Romano Prodi was the leader of L'Unione, having won the primary elections.

As of 2005, the coalition was assumed to be led by Prodi, however he called for a primary election in order to gain an official leadership. Primary elections were a novelty in Italian politics, as the proportional system in place until the early 1990s was supposed to present sufficient variety to electors. With the new majoritarian electoral system, two clear blocks emerged since 1996. The primary elections for The Union took place on 16 October 2005.

=== Previous primary election in Apulia ===
Primary elections had never been held on a national level before in Italy, and only once at a regional level, in Apulia: in that occasion, Nichi Vendola, a communist and gay Catholic, became the candidate for the centre-left coalition in a region reputed to be conservative and with deep religious roots. The institute of primary election came under criticism from some centre-left moderates, as in their opinion it had produced a useless candidate doomed to failure. However, Vendola's victory against the incumbent governor and centre-right candidate Raffaele Fitto, a much more conventional and moderate young man, vindicated the primary elections in the internal argumentations of The Union.

=== Candidates ===
When the primary elections were first proposed, they were mostly meant as a plebiscite for Romano Prodi, since there were no other candidates to the leadership of the coalition. The secretary of the Communist Refoundation Party, Fausto Bertinotti, then announced he would run for the leadership, even if only to act as a symbolic candidate, to avoid a one-candidate election. After some time, more candidates were presented.

The seven candidates for the leadership of The Union were, in the order in which they appear on the electoral ballot:

- Fausto Bertinotti, secretary of the Communist Refoundation Party.
- Antonio Di Pietro, former anti-corruption prosecutor in the Mani Pulite investigation, leader of Italy of Values.
- Ivan Scalfarotto, a manager living in London and a blogger, running as an independent candidate. He is openly bisexual.
- The faceless candidate, formally represented in person by Simona Panzino. This was a symbolic candidate from the anti-globalization movement. Some priests close to these movements were initially suggested for the actual name to place on the ballots, but they were retreated in face of likely backfire from the Holy See.
- Alfonso Pecoraro Scanio, secretary of the Federation of the Greens. Other than environmentalism, he had a civil rights-oriented and pacifist agenda. He is openly bisexual.
- Romano Prodi, leader of The Olive Tree coalition; former Prime Minister of Italy and president of the European Commission. Prodi was supported by DS, DL and PdCI.
- Clemente Mastella, leader of the Union of Democrats for Europe. A former ally of Silvio Berlusconi, he was considered the most Catholic and centrist candidate.

The primary election may have been foreseen an easy win for Romano Prodi, with the other candidates running mostly to "measure their strengths" in the coalition, and they often talked about reaching a certain percentage rather than winning. However, there were rumours of supporters of the House of Freedoms trying to participate in the elections, and vote in favour of Mastella, reputed to be the least competent of the candidates and the least likely to win against Berlusconi, other than the most centrist; other rumours indicated such "fake" left-wing voters would vote for Bertinotti, because his leadership would likely lose any grip on the political centre.

=== The election ===
The primary election had been held nationwide on 16 October 2005, from 8 am to 10 pm. The primary election was open to all Italian citizens who were at least 18 during the following general election, plus regular immigrants who have lived in Italy for three years (immigrants still do not have the opportunity to vote for any other election in Italy), against a payment of (at least) 1 euro, charged to cover organisational expenses. Poll stations were mainly managed on a voluntary basis; they were hosted mainly in squares, local party quarters, schools, and even restaurants, bars, campers and a hairdresser; some polling stations were also provided outside the country for Italians abroad. Most of the party leaders claimed a result of 1 million voters would be a good success for the election. The total count was in excess of 4,300,000.

==== Allegations of fraud by Mastella ====
Clemente Mastella claimed, already on the election day, that too few ballots had been provided in areas where his party is stronger, and that several pre-marked voting papers, pre-marked with votes for Prodi, have been prepared in order to let him lose. No one other than Mastella backed up these claims inside the coalition, and material evidence was not presented.

==== Murder of Francesco Fortugno ====
Francesco Fortugno, vice-president of the Council of Calabria and member of The Daisy (DL), was murdered on 16 October 2005 by two killers when he was waiting in line to vote in a polling station in Locri. The act was assumed to have political significance since the murderers killed him on a political occasion and with dozens of witnesses. The administration Fortugno was a part of had previously removed many administrators, and some saw this murder as an act of retribution from the 'Ndrangheta against Agazio Loiero's administration.

=== Results ===
59,816 poll stations

| Candidate | Votes | % |
|---|---|---|
| Romano Prodi | 3,182,686 | 74.1% |
| Fausto Bertinotti | 631,592 | 14.7% |
| Clemente Mastella | 196,014 | 4.6% |
| Antonio Di Pietro | 142,143 | 3.3% |
| Alfonso Pecoraro Scanio | 95,388 | 2.2% |
| Ivan Scalfarotto | 26,912 | 0.6% |
| Simona Panzino | 19,752 | 0.5% |
| White ballots | 7,583 | |
| Invalid ballots | 9,031 | |
| Total | 4,311,149 | 100.0% |

=== Reactions ===
Most reactions on the centre-left were comprehensibly enthusiastic, especially because of the high number of participants. Clemente Mastella, however, accused the organization of rigging the election and having pre-printed ballots in favour of Prodi.

On the centre-right, two main attitudes were held: some respected or even hailed the election, others contested its validity and characterised them as propaganda.

- Silvio Berlusconi said the primary elections "are the only way they can win";
- Gianfranco Fini expressed respect for voters, but suggested, on the basis of Mastella's claims, that the results may have been rigged;
- Roberto Maroni from the Lega Nord said that the elections "deserve respect in any case, but will not solve the centre-left's internal contradictions";
- Roberto Castelli, minister of justice, stigmatised the elections as a "perfect example of Soviet-style political campaign: there is no certification of the data purported by the centre-left, and knowing their methods they are certainly inflated".
- The Union of Christian and Centre Democrats expressed the most positive judgements from the centre-right, and Bruno Tabacci called for primary elections in the centre-right too, following tensions between his party and Berlusconi, no longer felt to be a strong candidate.

== Election results ==
=== Italian Parliament ===
| Election | Leader | Chamber of Deputies | | | | | Senate of the Republic | | | | |
| Election | Leader | Votes | % | Seats | +/– | Position | Votes | % | Seats | +/– | Position |
|---|---|---|---|---|---|---|---|---|---|---|---|
| 2006 | Romano Prodi | 19,036,986 | 49.8 | 348 / 630 | New | 1st | 17,118,364 | 49.2 | 158 / 315 | New | 2nd |

== See also ==
- The Olive Tree (Italy)
- Centre-left coalition (Italy)
- Elections in Italy
- 2006 Italian general elections
- History of Italy as a Republic
- Politics of Italy
- Primary elections in Italy
- Romano Prodi
