= Results of the 1996 Italian general election =

The 1996 Italian general election was held on 21 April, resulting in a narrow win for the Romano Prodi-led centre-left coalition, The Olive Tree, which had a covenant of desistance pact with the Communist Refoundation Party, over the Silvio Berlusconi-led centre-right coalition, the Pole for Freedoms, in both houses of the Italian Parliament, the Chamber of Deputies and the Senate of the Republic. It resulted in the formation of the Prodi I Cabinet.

== Chamber of Deputies ==
=== Overall results ===
← Summary of the 21 April 1996 Chamber of Deputies election results →
| Coalition | Party | Proportional | | | First-past-the-post | | | Total seats | +/– |
| Coalition | Party | Votes | % | Seats | Votes | % | Seats | Total seats | +/– |
|---|---|---|---|---|---|---|---|---|---|
| The Olive Tree | Democratic Party of the Left (PDS) | 7,894,118 | 21.06 | 26 | 15,747,455 | 42.01 | 146 | 172 (Note: Including 8 deputies of the Movement of Unitarian Communists (MCU), 6 deputies of the Labour Federation (FL), 5 deputies of the Social Christians (CS), 1 deputy of the Republican Left (SR), and 1 deputy of the Italian Democratic Socialist Party (PSDI)) | +48 |
| The Olive Tree | Populars for Prodi (PPI–UD–PRI–SVP) | 2,554,072 | 6.81 | 4 | 15,747,455 | 42.01 | 65 | 69 (Note: Including 5 deputies of the Democratic Union (UD), and 2 deputies of the Italian Republican Party (PRI)) | +18 |
| The Olive Tree | Italian Renewal (RI) | 1,627,380 | 4.34 | 8 | 15,747,455 | 42.01 | 18 | 26 (Note: Including 8 deputies of Segni Pact (Patto), 7 deputies of the Italian Socialists (SI), and 1 deputy of the Democratic Italian Movement (MID)) | New |
| The Olive Tree | Federation of the Greens (FdV) | 938,665 | 2.50 | 0 | 15,747,455 | 42.01 | 14 | 14 | +3 |
| The Olive Tree | The Network (LR) | — | — | 0 | 15,747,455 | 42.01 | 3 | 3 | −5 |
| The Olive Tree | Ladin Autonomist Union (UAL) | — | — | 0 | 15,747,455 | 42.01 | 1 | 1 | +1 |
| The Olive Tree | Total seats | | | 38 | | | 247 | 285 | – |
| Pole for Freedoms | Forza Italia (FI) | 7,712,149 | 20.57 | 37 | 15,027,030 | 40.08 | 86 | 123 (Note: Including 3 deputies of the Union of the Centre (UdC)) | −9 |
| Pole for Freedoms | National Alliance (AN) | 5,870,491 | 15.66 | 28 | 15,027,030 | 40.08 | 65 | 93 | −17 |
| Pole for Freedoms | CCD – CDU | 2,189,563 | 5.84 | 12 | 15,027,030 | 40.08 | 28 | 30 (Note: Including 19 deputies of CCD and 11 deputies of CDU) | +3 |
| Pole for Freedoms | Total seats | | | 77 | | | 169 | 246 | – |
| Northern League (LN) | | 3,776,354 | 10.07 | 20 | 4,038,239 | 10.77 | 39 | 59 | −59 |
| Communist Refoundation Party (PRC) | | 3,213,748 | 8.57 | 20 | 982,505 | 2.62 | 15 | 35 | −3 |
| South Tyrolean People's Party (SVP) | | — | — | 0 | 156,708 | 0.42 | 3 | 3 | ±0 |
| Southern Action League (LAM) | | 72,062 | 0.19 | 0 | 82,373 | 0.22 | 1 | 1 | ±0 |
| Aosta Valley (VdA) | | — | — | 0 | 37,431 | 0.10 | 1 | 1 | ±0 |
| Total | | | | | | | | 630 | – |

=== Proportional and FPTP results ===
First-past-the-post
| Parties and coalitions | Vote | % | Seats |
|---|---|---|---|
| Pole for Freedoms (PpL) | 15,027,030 | 40.09 | 169 |
| The Olive Tree (Ulivo) | 14,447,548 | 38.54 | 228 |
| Northern League (LN) | 4,038,239 | 10.77 | 39 |
| The Olive Tree – Venetian Autonomy League (Ulivo–LAV) | 997,534 | 2.66 | 14 |
| Progressives | 982,505 | 2.62 | 15 |
| Tricolour Flame (FT) | 624,558 | 1.67 | 0 |
| The Olive Tree – Sardinian Action Party (Ulivo–PSd'Az) | 269,047 | 0.72 | 4 |
| South Tyrolean People's Party (SVP) | 156,708 | 0.42 | 3 |
| Southern Action League (LAM) | 82,373 | 0.22 | 1 |
| Pannella-Sgarbi List (LPS) | 69,406 | 0.19 | 0 |
| Clean Hands (MP) | 68,443 | 0.18 | 0 |
| Socialist Party (PS) | 44,786 | 0.12 | 0 |
| Sardigna Natzione (SN) | 42,246 | 0.11 | 0 |
| Aosta Valley (VdA) | 37,431 | 0.10 | 1 |
| Democracy and Freedom (DL) | 33,326 | 0.09 | 1 |
| Renovation | 28,988 | 0.08 | 0 |
| Humanist Party (PU) | 27,694 | 0.07 | 0 |
| Italian Renaissance Movement (MRI) | 24,074 | 0.06 | 0 |
| Union for South Tyrol (UfS) | 23,032 | 0.06 | 0 |
| We Sicilians – Sicilian National Front (NS–FNS) | 20,102 | 0.05 | 0 |
| Pact for the Agro | 18,836 | 0.05 | 0 |
| Communist Refoundation Party (PRC) | 17,996 | 0.05 | 0 |
| Greens Greens | 12,905 | 0.03 | 0 |
| Environmentalists | 12,299 | 0.03 | 0 |
| Liberal Federalists (FL) | 11,563 | 0.03 | 0 |
| Aosta Valley for the Olive Tree | 11,526 | 0.03 | 0 |
| Social Democracy (DS) | 9,760 | 0.03 | 0 |
| North-East Union (UNE) | 9,669 | 0.03 | 0 |
| Independent Group Freedom (GIL) | 8,805 | 0.02 | 0 |
| Natural Law Party (PLN) | 7,708 | 0.02 | 0 |
| Moderates | 6,208 | 0.02 | 0 |
| New Energies | 5,627 | 0.02 | 0 |
| New Democracy (ND) | 5,333 | 0.01 | 0 |
| Development and Legality | 5,275 | 0.01 | 0 |
| For Marche | 4,317 | 0.01 | 0 |
| Resurgence of the South | 4,291 | 0.01 | 0 |
| Free North Autonomy | 4,013 | 0.01 | 0 |
| New Ways | 3,904 | 0.01 | 0 |
| State of Friuli | 3,345 | 0.01 | 0 |
| Liberist Solidal Alliance | 3,219 | 0.01 | 0 |
| Ingenuity and Audacity | 2,805 | 0.01 | 0 |
| Venetian Solidarity | 2,655 | 0.01 | 0 |
| South Pole Movement | 2,310 | 0.01 | 0 |
| Federalist Italian League (LIF) | 2,268 | 0.01 | 0 |
| Trieste Women's Pact | 2,121 | 0.01 | 0 |
| Others | 71,281 | 0.19 | 0 |
| Total | 37,295,109 | 100.00 | 475 |

Proportional
| Party | Votes | % | Seats |
|---|---|---|---|
| Democratic Party of the Left (PDS) | 7,894,118 | 21.06 | 26 |
| Forza Italia (FI) | 7,712,149 | 20.57 | 37 |
| National Alliance (AN) | 5,870,491 | 15.66 | 28 |
| Northern League (LN) | 3,776,354 | 10.07 | 20 |
| Communist Refoundation Party (PRC) | 3,213,748 | 8.57 | 20 |
| Populars for Prodi (PPI–UD–PRI–SVP) | 2,554,072 | 6.81 | 4 |
| Christian Democratic Centre–CDU (CCD–CDU) | 2,189,563 | 5.84 | 12 |
| Italian Renewal (RI) | 1,627,380 | 4.34 | 8 |
| Federation of the Greens (FdV) | 938,665 | 2.50 | 0 |
| Pannella-Sgarbi List (LPS) | 702,988 | 1.88 | 0 |
| Tricolour Flame (FT) | 339,351 | 0.91 | 0 |
| Socialist Party (PS) | 149,441 | 0.40 | 0 |
| Southern Action League (LAM) | 72,062 | 0.19 | 0 |
| North-East Union (UNE) | 63,934 | 0.17 | 0 |
| Union for South Tyrol (UfS) | 55,548 | 0.15 | 0 |
| Clean Hands (MP) | 44,935 | 0.12 | 0 |
| We Sicilians – Sicilian National Front (NS–FNS) | 41,001 | 0.11 | 0 |
| Sardinian Action Party (PSd'Az) | 38,002 | 0.10 | 0 |
| Greens Greens | 25,788 | 0.07 | 0 |
| Sardgna Natzione (SN) | 23,355 | 0.06 | 0 |
| Independent Group Freedom | 17,451 | 0.05 | 0 |
| Environmentalists | 15,560 | 0.04 | 0 |
| Humanist Party (PU) | 14,601 | 0.04 | 0 |
| Renovation | 13,677 | 0.04 | 0 |
| Pact for the Agro | 12,297 | 0.03 | 0 |
| Social Democracy | 9,319 | 0.02 | 0 |
| Italian Renaissance Movement (MRI) | 8,886 | 0.02 | 0 |
| Tuscan Autonomist Movement (MAT) | 8,627 | 0.02 | 0 |
| Natural Law Party (PLN) | 8,298 | 0.02 | 0 |
| New Democracy | 8,185 | 0.02 | 0 |
| Liberal Federalists (FL) | 6,475 | 0.02 | 0 |
| For Marche | 5,545 | 0.01 | 0 |
| New Energies | 5,393 | 0.01 | 0 |
| Development and Legality | 5,347 | 0.01 | 0 |
| Free North Autonomy | 4,965 | 0.01 | 0 |
| Federalist Party (PF) | 3,743 | 0.01 | 0 |
| Resurgence of the South | 3,084 | 0.01 | 0 |
| Total | 100.00 | 37,484,398 | 155 |
| Invalid/blank/unassigned votes | – | 2,917,376 | – |
| Total | – | 40,401,774 | – |
| Registered voters/turnout | 82.88% | 48,744,846 | – |
Source: Ministry of the Interior

Popular vote (Proportional)
| PDS | 21.06% |
| FI | 20.57% |
| AN | 15.66% |
| LN | 10.07% |
| PRC | 8.57% |
| Popolari | 6.81% |
| CCD-CDU | 5.84% |
| RI | 4.34% |
| FdV | 2.50% |
| LPS | 1.88% |
| Others | 2.68% |

Popular vote (First-past-the-post)
| Ulivo | 41.92% |
| PpL | 40.09% |
| LN | 10.77% |
| PRC | 2.62% |
| FT | 1.67% |
| Others | 3.65% |

== Senate of the Republic ==
=== Overall results ===
← Summary of the 21 April 1996 Senate of the Republic election results →
| Coalition | Party | First-past-the-post | | | Proportional Seats | Total seats | +/– |
| Coalition | Party | Votes | % | Seats | Proportional Seats | Total seats | +/– |
|---|---|---|---|---|---|---|---|
| The Olive Tree | Democratic Party of the Left (PDS) | 13,434,607 | 41.18 | 134 | 23 | 102 (Note: Including 5 senators of the Labour Federation (FL) and 4 senators of the Social Christians (CS)) | +26 |
| The Olive Tree | Italian People's Party (PPI) | 13,434,607 | 41.18 | 134 | 23 | 27 | −4 |
| The Olive Tree | Federation of the Greens (FdV) | 13,434,607 | 41.18 | 134 | 23 | 14 | +7 |
| The Olive Tree | Italian Renewal (RI) | 13,434,607 | 41.18 | 134 | 23 | 11 (Note: Including 5 senators of the Italian Socialists (SI), 1 senator of Segni Pact (PS), and 1 senator of the Democratic Italian Movement (MID)) | New |
| The Olive Tree | The Network (LR) | 13,434,607 | 41.18 | 134 | 23 | 1 | −5 |
| The Olive Tree | Venetian Autonomy League (LAV) | 13,434,607 | 41.18 | 134 | 23 | 1 | +1 |
| The Olive Tree | Sardinian Action Party (PSd'Az) | 13,434,607 | 41.18 | 134 | 23 | 1 | +1 |
| The Olive Tree | Total seats | | | | | 157 | – |
| Pole for Freedoms | Forza Italia (FI) | 12,185,020 | 37.35 | 67 | 49 | 48 (Note: Including 2 senators of the Union of the Centre (UdC)) | +13 |
| Pole for Freedoms | National Alliance (AN) | 12,185,020 | 37.35 | 67 | 49 | 43 | −4 |
| Pole for Freedoms | Christian Democratic Centre (CCD) | 12,185,020 | 37.35 | 67 | 49 | 15 | +3 |
| Pole for Freedoms | United Christian Democrats (CDU) | 12,185,020 | 37.35 | 67 | 49 | 10 | New |
| Pole for Freedoms | Total seats | | | | | 116 | – |
| Northern League (LN) | | 3,394,733 | 10.41 | 18 | 9 | 27 | −33 |
| Progressives | | 934,974 | 2.87 | 10 | 0 | 10 | −8 |
| Tricolour Flame (FT) | | 747,487 | 2.29 | 0 | 1 | 1 | New |
| Pannella-Sgarbi List (LPS) | | 509,826 | 1.56 | 0 | 1 | 1 | ±0 |
| The Fir–SVP–PATT | | 178,425 | 0.55 | 2 | 0 | 2 | −1 |
| Aosta Valley (VdA) | | 27,493 | 0.08 | 1 | 0 | 1 | ±0 |
| Total | | | | | | 315 | – |

=== Proportional and FPTP results ===
| Party or coalition | Votes | % | Seats | |
| Party or coalition | Votes | % | FPTP | Proportional |
|---|---|---|---|---|
| The Olive Tree (Ulivo) | 13,013,276 | 39.89 | 152 | 23 |
| Pole for Freedoms (PdL) | 12,185,020 | 37.35 | 116 | 49 |
| Northern League (LN) | 3,394,733 | 10.41 | 27 | 9 |
| Progressives | 934,974 | 2.87 | 10 | 0 |
| Tricolour Flame (FT) | 747,487 | 2.29 | 0 | 1 |
| Pannella-Sgarbi List (LPS) | 509,826 | 1.56 | 0 | 1 |
| Socialist Party (PS) | 286,426 | 0.88 | 0 | 0 |
| The Fir–SVP–PATT | 178,425 | 0.55 | 2 | 0 |
| Clean Hands (MP) | 109,113 | 0.33 | 0 | 0 |
| League for Autonomy – Lombard Alliance (LAL) | 106,313 | 0.33 | 0 | 0 |
| North-East Union (UNE) | 72,541 | 0.22 | 0 | 0 |
| We Sicilians – Sicilian National Front (NS–FNS) | 71,841 | 0.22 | 0 | 0 |
| Southern Action League (LAM) | 66,750 | 0.20 | 0 | 0 |
| Greens Greens (VV) | 61,434 | 0.19 | 0 | 0 |
| Pensioners' Party (PP) | 60,640 | 0.19 | 0 | 0 |
| Social Democracy | 60,016 | 0.18 | 0 | 0 |
| Federation of Italian Civic Lists | 55,793 | 0.17 | 0 | 0 |
| Sardigna Natzione (SN) | 44,713 | 0.14 | 0 | 0 |
| Aosta Valley (VdA) | 27,493 | 0.08 | 1 | 0 |
| Piedmont Nation of Europe | 26,951 | 0.08 | 0 | 0 |
| Environmentalists | 26,756 | 0.08 | 0 | 0 |
| Independent Group Freedom (GIL) | 23,301 | 0.07 | 0 | 0 |
| Union for South Tyrol (UfS) | 19,330 | 0.06 | 0 | 0 |
| Tuscan Autonomist Movement (MAT) | 18,691 | 0.06 | 0 | 0 |
| Pact for the Agro | 17,980 | 0.06 | 0 | 0 |
| Renovation | 16,216 | 0.05 | 0 | 0 |
| Aosta Valley for the Olive Tree | 10,371 | 0.03 | 0 | 0 |
| Right of the People | 6,710 | 0.02 | 0 | 0 |
| Natural Law Party (PLN) | 10,371 | 0.03 | 0 | 0 |
| Democrats for Progress | 5,688 | 0.02 | 0 | 0 |
| Communist Refoundation Party (PRC) | 5,681 | 0.02 | 0 | 0 |
| Popular Movement of Moralization (MPM) | 5,297 | 0.02 | 0 | 0 |
| Azure Alps | 5,144 | 0.02 | 0 | 0 |
| Democratic Alternative for the Roman Castles | 4,524 | 0.01 | 0 | 0 |
| Progressive People's Party (PPP) | 4,450 | 0.01 | 0 | 0 |
| For a Normal Country | 3,976 | 0.01 | 0 | 0 |
| European Dolomite Region | 2,898 | 0.01 | 0 | 0 |
| Free North Autonomy | 2,411 | 0.01 | 0 | 0 |
| Hit the Center | 2,178 | 0.01 | 0 | 0 |
| Total | 32,624,584 | 100.00 | 232 | 83 |

Popular vote
| Ulivo | 39.89% |
| PpL | 37.35% |
| LN | 10.41% |
| Prog. | 2.87% |
| FT | 2.29% |
| LPS | 1.56% |
| Others | 5.63% |

== Maps ==
Results for the Chamber of Deputies (left) and Senate of the Republic (right) in single-member constituencies. The colour corresponds to the party or coalition that won the constituency. Red represents The Olive Tree, blue the Pole for Freedoms, green the Northern League, dark red the Communist Refoundation Party, black the South-Tyrolean People's Party, indigo the Southern Action League, and turquoise the Aosta Valley coalition.

Composition of the Chamber of Deputies and of the Senate by coalition

== Leaders' races ==
1996 Italian general election (C): Bologna – Mazzini
| Candidate | Coalition | Party | Votes | % |
|---|---|---|---|---|
| Romano Prodi | The Olive Tree | Ind | 55,830 | 60.82 |
| Filippo Berselli | Pole for Freedoms | AN | 35,972 | 39.18 |
| Total | | | 91,802 | 100.0 |
| Turnout | | | 95,948 | 92.26 |
| Centre-left hold | | | | |
Source: Ministry of the Interior

1996 Italian general election (C): Milan Centre
| Candidate | Coalition | Party | Votes | % |
|---|---|---|---|---|
| Silvio Berlusconi | Pole for Freedoms | FI | 46,098 | 51.50 |
| Michele Salvati | The Olive Tree | PDS | 32,464 | 36.27 |
| Umberto Bossi * | | LN | 10,179 | 11.37 |
| Camillo Comelli | | PU | 766 | 0.86 |
| Total | | | 89,507 | 100.0 |
| Turnout | | | 92,969 | 82.64 |
| Centre-right gain from LN | | | | |
* incumbent defeated
Source: Ministry of the Interior

== See also ==
- Results of the 2022 Italian general election
