= 1996 Italian general election in Sardinia =

The Italian general election of 1996 took place on 21 April 1996.

The election was won in Sardinia by the centre-left The Olive Tree (which included the Sardinian Action Party), which won also nationally.

== Results ==
=== Chamber of Deputies ===
| Coalitions | Single-seat constituencies | | | Proportional system | | | | | Total |
|---|---|---|---|---|---|---|---|---|---|
| Coalitions | votes | votes (%) | seats | Parties | votes | votes (%) | seats | tot. | seats |
| The Olive Tree–Progressives–PSd'Az | 482,169 | 48.8 | 8 | Democratic Party of the Left | 202,142 | 20.3 | 1 | 2 | 10 |
| The Olive Tree–Progressives–PSd'Az | 482,169 | 48.8 | 8 | Communist Refoundation Party | 83,813 | 8.4 | 1 | 2 | 10 |
| The Olive Tree–Progressives–PSd'Az | 482,169 | 48.8 | 8 | Italian Renewal-Socialists-Patto | 69,969 | 7.0 | - | 2 | 10 |
| The Olive Tree–Progressives–PSd'Az | 482,169 | 48.8 | 8 | Italian People's Party-UD-PRI-SVP-Prodi | 60,974 | 6.1 | - | 2 | 10 |
| The Olive Tree–Progressives–PSd'Az | 482,169 | 48.8 | 8 | Federation of the Greens | 20,713 | 2.1 | - | 2 | 10 |
| The Olive Tree–Progressives–PSd'Az | 482,169 | 48.8 | 8 | Sardinian Action Party | 38,002 | 3.8 | - | 2 | 10 |
| Pole of Freedoms | 456,253 | 46.1 | 6 | Forza Italia | 227,596 | 22.9 | 1 | 2 | 8 |
| Pole of Freedoms | 456,253 | 46.1 | 6 | National Alliance | 182,648 | 18.3 | 1 | 2 | 8 |
| Pole of Freedoms | 456,253 | 46.1 | 6 | CCD-CDU | 60,205 | 6.0 | - | 2 | 8 |
| Pole of Freedoms | 456,253 | 46.1 | 6 | Pannella-Sgarbi List | 20,537 | 2.1 | - | 2 | 8 |
| Sardinia Nation | 42,246 | 4.3 | - | Sardinia Nation | 23,355 | 2.3 | - | - | - |
| Others | 8,332 | 0.8 | - | others | 6,270 | 0.6 | - | - | - |
| Total coalitions | 989,000 | 100.0 | 14 | Total parties | 996,224 | 100.0 | 4 | 4 | 18 |

Source: Ministry of the Interior

=== Senate ===
| Coalitions | Single-seat constituencies | | | Prop. | Total |
|---|---|---|---|---|---|
| Coalitions | votes | votes (%) | seats | seats | seats |
| The Olive Tree–PSd'Az | 421,331 | 50.0 | 5 | - | 5 |
| Pole for Freedoms | 376,042 | 44.7 | 1 | 3 | 4 |
| Sardinia Nation | 44,713 | 5.3 | - | - | - |
| Total coalitions | 842,086 | 100.0 | 6 | 3 | 9 |

Source: Ministry of the Interior
