= List of Italian Chamber of Deputies multi-member constituencies (1994–2006) =

This is a list of Italian multi-member constituencies from 1994 to 2006. For the election of the Italian Chamber of Deputies, since 1993 Italy is divided in 27 districts called circoscrizioni. However, the distribution of seats being calculated at national level, districts serve only to choose the single candidates inside the party lists. During the election of the Italian Senate, according to the Constitution, each Region is a single district, without connections at national level.

During the Regional elections, the districts correspond to the Provinces, even if some seats are allocated at regional level. For the Provincial elections, a special system is used, based on localized lists: even if the competition is disputed on provincial level, candidates are presented in single-member districts, and their final position inside each party list depends by the percentage of votes they received in their own districts. Finally, for the Communal elections no districts are used.

== Electoral districts for the Chamber of Deputies from 1994 to 2006 ==
=== Aosta Valley ===
Deputies for Aosta Valley (1994–2006)
Key to parties AV
Legislature	Election	Distribution
12th	1994	1
13th	1996	1
14th	2001	1

=== Piedmont 1 ===
Deputies for Piedmont 1 (1994–2006)
Key to parties PRC PDS/DS DL PPI RI FI AN LN
Key to coalitions AdP Ulivo PdL/PpL/CdL
Legislature	Election	Distribution	
Legislature	Election	Proportional	First-past-the-post
12th	1994	2 / 1 / 1 / 1 / 1	5 / 14
13th	1996	1 / 1 / 2 / 1 / 1	1 / 18
14th	2001	1 / 1 / 3 / 1	15 / 4

=== Piedmont 2 ===
Deputies for Piedmont 2 (1994–2006)
Key to parties PRC PDS/DS DL PPI CCD–CDU FI AN LN
Key to coalitions Ulivo PdL/PpL/CdL
Legislature	Election	Distribution	
Legislature	Election	Proportional	First-past-the-post
12th	1994	1 / 1 / 1 / 1 / 1 / 1	17
13th	1996	1 / 1 / 1 / 1 / 1 / 2	5 / 11 / 1
14th	2001	1 / 1 / 3 / 1	1 / 16

=== Lombardy 1 ===
Deputies for Lombardy 1 (1994–2006)
Key to parties PRC PDS/DS DL PPI PS RI FI AN LN
Key to coalitions Ulivo PdL/PpL/CdL
Legislature	Election	Distribution	
Legislature	Election	Proportional	First-past-the-post
12th	1994	1 / 3 / 1 / 1 / 2 / 1 / 1	31
13th	1996	2 / 2 / 1 / 1 / 1 / 3	9 / 22
14th	2001	1 / 2 / 2 / 4 / 1	2 / 29

=== Lombardy 2 ===
Deputies for Lombardy 2 (1994–2006)
Key to parties PRC PDS/DS DL PPI PS RI CCD–CDU FI AN LN
Key to coalitions Ulivo PdL/PpL/CdL
Legislature	Election	Distribution	
Legislature	Election	Proportional	First-past-the-post
12th	1994	1 / 2 / 2 / 1 / 2 / 1 / 2	32
13th	1996	1 / 1 / 1 / 2 / 1 / 3	5 / 7 / 20
14th	2001	1 / 1 / 3 / 4 / 1	32

=== Lombardy 3 ===
Deputies for Lombardy 3 (1994–2006)
Key to parties PRC PDS/DS PPI FI AN LN
Key to coalitions AdP Ulivo PdL/PpL/CdL
Legislature	Election	Distribution	
Legislature	Election	Proportional	First-past-the-post
12th	1994	1 / 1 / 1 / 1	1 / 10
13th	1996	1 / 1 / 1 / 1	6 / 5
14th	2001	1 / 2 / 1	2 / 9

=== Trentino-Alto Adige/Südtirol ===
Deputies for Trentino-Alto Adige/Südtirol (1994–2006)
Key to parties DL PPI SVP FI AN LN
Key to coalitions Ulivo PdL/PpL/CdL
Legislature	Election	Distribution	
Legislature	Election	Proportional	First-past-the-post
12th	1994	1 / 1	3 / 4 / 1
13th	1996	1 / 1	4 / 3 / 1
14th	2001	1 / 1	5 / 3

=== Veneto 1 ===
Deputies for Veneto 1 (1994–2006)
Key to parties PRC PDS/DS DL PPI PS CCD–CDU FI AN LN
Key to coalitions Ulivo PdL/PpL/CdL
Legislature	Election	Distribution	
Legislature	Election	Proportional	First-past-the-post
12th	1994	1 / 1 / 2 / 1 / 1 / 1 / 1	22
13th	1996	1 / 1 / 1 / 1 / 1 / 1 / 2	8 / 6 / 8
14th	2001	1 / 1 / 2 / 3 / 1	2 / 20

=== Veneto 2 ===
Deputies for Veneto 2 (1994–2006)
Key to parties PRC PDS/DS DL PPI RI FI AN LN
Key to coalitions AdP Ulivo PdL/PpL/CdL
Legislature	Election	Distribution	
Legislature	Election	Proportional	First-past-the-post
12th	1994	1 / 1 / 1 / 1 / 1	1 / 14
13th	1996	1 / 1 / 1 / 2	1 / 6 / 1 / 7
14th	2001	1 / 1 / 2 / 1	5 / 10

=== Friuli-Venezia Giulia ===
Deputies for Friuli-Venezia Giulia (1994–2006)
Key to parties PDS/DS DL PPI CIpT FI AN LN
Key to coalitions Ulivo PdL/PpL/CdL
Legislature	Election	Distribution	
Legislature	Election	Proportional	First-past-the-post
12th	1994	1 / 1 / 1	10
13th	1996	1 / 1 / 1	5 / 2 / 3
14th	2001	1 / 1 / 1	1 / 1 / 8

=== Liguria ===
Deputies for Liguria (1994–2006)
Key to parties PRC PDS/DS PPI FI AN LN
Key to coalitions AdP Ulivo PdL/PpL/CdL
Legislature	Election	Distribution	
Legislature	Election	Proportional	First-past-the-post
12th	1994	2 / 1 / 1 / 1 / 1	7 / 7
13th	1996	1 / 1 / 1 / 1 / 1	1 / 9 / 4
14th	2001	1 / 2 / 2 / 1	9 / 5

=== Emilia-Romagna ===
Deputies for Emilia-Romagna (1994–2006)
Key to parties PRC PDS/DS DL PPI CCD–CDU FI AN LN
Key to coalitions AdP Ulivo PdL/PpL/CdL
Legislature	Election	Distribution	
Legislature	Election	Proportional	First-past-the-post
12th	1994	1 / 3 / 1 / 2 / 1 / 1	29 / 3
13th	1996	3 / 1 / 2 / 2 / 2	3 / 28 / 1
14th	2001	1 / 3 / 1 / 3 / 1	30 / 2

=== Tuscany ===
Deputies for Tuscany (1994–2006)
Key to parties PRC PDS/DS DL PPI PS CCD–CDU FI AN LN
Key to coalitions AdP Ulivo PdL/PpL/CdL
Legislature	Election	Distribution	
Legislature	Election	Proportional	First-past-the-post
12th	1994	1 / 3 / 1 / 1 / 3 / 1	29
13th	1996	1 / 2 / 1 / 2 / 3 / 1	4 / 24 / 1
14th	2001	1 / 3 / 1 / 3 / 2	27 / 2

=== Umbria ===
Deputies for Umbria (1994–2006)
Key to parties PRC PDS/DS FI AN
Key to coalitions AdP Ulivo PdBG/PpL/CdL
Legislature	Election	Distribution	
Legislature	Election	Proportional	First-past-the-post
12th	1994	1 / 1	7
13th	1996	1 / 1	1 / 6
14th	2001	1 / 1	7

=== Marche ===
Deputies for Umbria (1994–2006)
Key to parties PRC PDS/DS DL PPI CCD–CDU FI AN
Key to coalitions AdP Ulivo PdL/PpL/CdL
Legislature	Election	Distribution	
Legislature	Election	Proportional	First-past-the-post
12th	1994	1 / 1 / 1 / 1	12
13th	1996	1 / 1 / 1 / 1	2 / 9 / 1
14th	2001	1 / 1 / 1 / 1	10 / 2

=== Lazio 1 ===
Deputies for Lazio 1 (1994–2006)
Key to parties PRC PDS/DS DL PPI PS RI FI AN
Key to coalitions AdP Ulivo PdBG/PpL/CdL
Legislature	Election	Distribution	
Legislature	Election	Proportional	First-past-the-post
12th	1994	2 / 4 / 1 / 2 / 1	3 / 29
13th	1996	2 / 1 / 1 / 1 / 5	21 / 11
14th	2001	1 / 3 / 2 / 2 / 2	19 / 13

=== Lazio 2 ===
Deputies for Lazio 2 (1994–2006)
Key to parties PRC PDS/DS PPI CCD–CDU FI AN
Key to coalitions Ulivo PdBG/PpL/CdL
Legislature	Election	Distribution	
Legislature	Election	Proportional	First-past-the-post
12th	1994	1 / 1 / 1	11
13th	1996	1 / 1 / 1 / 1 / 1	6 / 5
14th	2001	1 / 2 / 1	11

=== Abruzzo ===
Deputies for Abruzzo (1994–2006)
Key to parties PRC PDS/DS PPI FI AN
Key to coalitions AdP Ulivo PdBG/PpL/CdL
Legislature	Election	Distribution	
Legislature	Election	Proportional	First-past-the-post
12th	1994	1 / 1 / 1	10 / 1
13th	1996	1 / 1 / 1	6 / 5
14th	2001	1 / 2 / 1	6 / 5

=== Molise ===
Deputies for Molise (1994–2006)
Key to parties PDS/DS PPI FI
Key to coalitions AdP Ulivo PdBG/PpL/CdL
Legislature	Election	Distribution	
Legislature	Election	Proportional	First-past-the-post
12th	1994	1	1 / 2
13th	1996	1	2 / 1
14th	2001	1	1 / 2

=== Campania 1 ===
Deputies for Campania 1 (1994–2006)
Key to parties PRC PDS/DS DL PPI PS FI AN
Key to coalitions AdP Ulivo PdBG/PpL/CdL
Legislature	Election	Distribution	
Legislature	Election	Proportional	First-past-the-post
12th	1994	2 / 1 / 1 / 2 / 2	15 / 10
13th	1996	2 / 4 / 2	1 / 19 / 5
14th	2001	1 / 2 / 1 / 4 / 1	10 / 15

=== Campania 2 ===
Deputies for Campania 2 (1994–2006)
Key to parties PRC PDS/DS DL PPI PS DeL RI CCD–CDU FI AN
Key to coalitions AdP Ulivo PpI PdBG/PpL/CdL
Legislature	Election	Distribution	
Legislature	Election	Proportional	First-past-the-post
12th	1994	1 / 1 / 1 / 2 / 2	12 / 3 / 1 / 6
13th	1996	1 / 2 / 1 / 1 / 2	5 / 1 / 16
14th	2001	1 / 1 / 1 / 3 / 1	8 / 14

=== Apulia ===
Deputies for Apulia (1994–2006)
Key to parties PRC PDS/DS DL PPI PS RI CCD–CDU LAM FI AN
Key to coalitions AdP Ulivo PdBG/PpL/CdL
Legislature	Election	Distribution	
Legislature	Election	Proportional	First-past-the-post
12th	1994	2 / 3 / 3 / 1 / 1	10 / 1 / 23
13th	1996	1 / 2 / 2 / 4 / 1	16 / 1 / 17
14th	2001	1 / 1 / 2 / 4 / 2	12 / 22

=== Basilicata ===
Deputies for Basilicata (1994–2006)
Key to parties DL PPI FI AN
Key to coalitions AdP Ulivo PdBG/PpL/CdL
Legislature	Election	Distribution	
Legislature	Election	Proportional	First-past-the-post
12th	1994	1 / 1	4 / 1
13th	1996	1 / 1	4 / 1
14th	2001	1 / 1	5

=== Calabria ===
Deputies for Calabria (1994–2006)
Key to parties PRC PDS/DS DL PPI PS RI CCD–CDU FI AN
Key to coalitions AdP Ulivo PdBG/PpL/CdL
Legislature	Election	Distribution	
Legislature	Election	Proportional	First-past-the-post
12th	1994	1 / 1 / 1 / 1 / 1 / 1	10 / 7
13th	1996	1 / 1 / 1 / 1 / 2	11 / 6
14th	2001	2 / 1 / 2 / 1	16 / 11

=== Sicily 1 ===
Deputies for Sicily 1 (1994–2006)
Key to parties PRC PDS/DS DL PPI PS RI FI AN
Key to coalitions AdP Ulivo PdBG/PpL/CdL
Legislature	Election	Distribution	
Legislature	Election	Proportional	First-past-the-post
12th	1994	2 / 1 / 1 / 2 / 1	4 / 16
13th	1996	1 / 1 / 1 / 1 / 2 / 1	5 / 15
14th	2001	1 / 1 / 4 / 1	20

=== Sicily 2 ===
Deputies for Sicily 2 (1994–2006)
Key to parties PRC PDS/DS DL PPI PS RI CCD–CDU FI AN
Key to coalitions Ulivo PdBG/PpL/CdL
Legislature	Election	Distribution	
Legislature	Election	Proportional	First-past-the-post
12th	1994	2 / 1 / 1 / 2 / 1	21
13th	1996	1 / 2 / 1 / 3	5 / 16
14th	2001	1 / 1 / 3 / 2	21

=== Sardinia ===
Deputies for Sardinia (1994–2006)
Key to parties PRC PDS/DS DL PPI PS FI AN
Key to coalitions AdP Ulivo PpI PdBG/PpL/CdL
Legislature	Election	Distribution	
Legislature	Election	Proportional	First-past-the-post
12th	1994	1 / 1 / 1 / 1	4 / 1 / 9
13th	1996	1 / 1 / 1 / 1	1 / 7 / 6
14th	2001	1 / 1 / 2	5 / 9

== See also ==
- List of Italian Chamber of Deputies single-member constituencies (1994–2006)
- List of Italian Senate constituencies (1994–2006)
