= 2000 Tuscan regional election =

- 16 April 2000

All 50 seats to the Regional Council
- Turnout: 74.6% (▼10.6%)
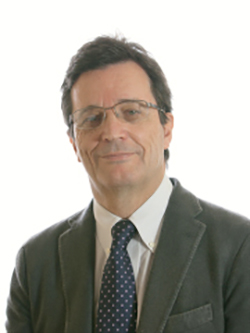

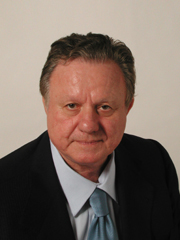
	Majority party	Minority party
Leader	Claudio Martini	Altero Matteoli
Party	DS	National Alliance
Alliance	The Olive Tree	Pole for Freedoms
Last election	33	13
Seats won	32	16
Seat change	▼1	▲3
Popular vote	1,029,142	836,001
Percentage	49.3%	40.0%
Swing	▼0.8%	▲4.0%
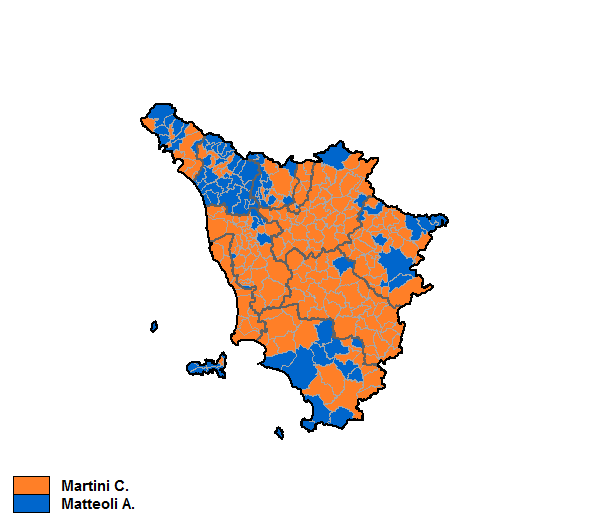
President before election
Vannino Chiti
DS
Elected President
Claudio Martini
DS

The Tuscan regional election of 2000 took place on 16 April 2000.

== Electoral system ==
Regional elections in Tuscany were ruled by the "Tatarella law" (approved in 1995), which provided for a mixed electoral system: four fifths of the regional councilors were elected in provincial constituencies by proportional representation, using the largest remainder method with a droop quota and open lists, while the residual votes and the unassigned seats were grouped into a "single regional constituency", where the whole ratios and the highest remainders were divided with the Hare method among the provincial party lists; one fifth of the council seats instead was reserved for regional lists and assigned with a majoritarian system: the leader of the regional list that scored the highest number of votes was elected to the presidency of the Region while the other candidates were elected regional councilors.

A threshold of 3% had been established for the provincial lists, which, however, could still have entered the regional council if the regional list to which they were connected had scored at least 5% of valid votes.

The panachage was also allowed: the voter can indicate a candidate for the presidency but prefer a provincial list connected to another candidate.

== Parties and candidates ==
Political party or alliance	Constituent lists	Previous result		Candidate
Political party or alliance	Constituent lists	Votes (%)	Seats	Candidate
Centre-left coalition	Democrats of the Left	40.9	19	Claudio Martini
Centre-left coalition	Italian People's Party	6.3	2	Claudio Martini
Centre-left coalition	Federation of the Greens	2.7	1	Claudio Martini
Centre-left coalition	Italian Democratic Socialists – Italian Republican Party	0.8	–	Claudio Martini
Centre-left coalition	The Democrats	—N/a	—N/a	Claudio Martini
Centre-left coalition	Party of Italian Communists	—N/a	—N/a	Claudio Martini
Centre-left coalition	Union of Democrats for Europe	—N/a	—N/a	Claudio Martini
Centre-right coalition	Forza Italia	19.1	7	Altero Matteoli
Centre-right coalition	National Alliance	13.1	5	Altero Matteoli
Centre-right coalition	Christian Democratic Centre	2.5	1	Altero Matteoli
Centre-right coalition	Northern League Tuscany	0.7	–	Altero Matteoli
Centre-right coalition	United Christian Democrats	—N/a	—N/a	Altero Matteoli
Centre-right coalition	Socialist Party	—N/a	—N/a	Altero Matteoli
Centre-right coalition	Others	—N/a	—N/a	Altero Matteoli
Communist Refoundation Party		11.1	4	Niccolò Pecorini
Bonino List		1.3	–	Gianfranco Dell'Alba

== Results ==
1999 European election marked a turning point in relations between Forza Italia and the Northern League. In fact, the assembly works in Parliament had highlighted a growing programmatic convergence between the two parties. And so, in view of the 2001 general election, Berlusconi and Umberto Bossi put aside the old, and even bloody quarrels, and formed a new coalition: the Pole for Freedoms, which found in the regional elections, also in Tuscany, its first test. So the center-right candidate, Altero Matteoli, an important figure on the national landscape, was sustained also by the Northern League, which in 1995 had sustained Chiti.

The combination of what were the major forces of regional politics, securing an appointment to Claudio Martini, which ensured stability of the Regional Cabinet that the new regulations wanted to coincide in term with the legislature. Democrats of the Left was confirmed as the largest party in the region with 36% of the vote, while Forza Italia was the second largest party with 20%. The Olive Tree, an alliance comprising several centre-left parties including the Italian People's Party, the Democrats of the Left, The Democrats, the Federation of the Greens and Party of Italian Communists, had a reconfirmation but lost votes.

Like 1995 election, Communist Refoundation Party run lonely with its candidate.

16 April 2000 Tuscan regional election results
Candidates	Votes	%	Seats	Parties	Votes	%	Seats
Claudio Martini	1,029,142	49.30	10				
Claudio Martini	1,029,142	49.30	10	Democrats of the Left	708,750	36.20	17
Claudio Martini	1,029,142	49.30	10	Italian People's Party	71,195	3.64	1
Claudio Martini	1,029,142	49.30	10	The Democrats	64,606	3.30	1
Claudio Martini	1,029,142	49.30	10	Party of Italian Communists	59,258	3.03	1
Claudio Martini	1,029,142	49.30	10	Federation of the Greens	42,269	2.16	1
Claudio Martini	1,029,142	49.30	10	Italian Democratic Socialists – Italian Republican Party	36,413	1.86	1
Claudio Martini	1,029,142	49.30	10	Union of Democrats for Europe	2,406	0.12	–
Claudio Martini	1,029,142	49.30	10	Total	984,897	50.30	22
Altero Matteoli	839,001	40.05	1				
Altero Matteoli	839,001	40.05	1	Forza Italia	395,946	20.22	8
Altero Matteoli	839,001	40.05	1	National Alliance	291,200	14.87	5
Altero Matteoli	839,001	40.05	1	United Christian Democrats	40,692	2.08	1
Altero Matteoli	839,001	40.05	1	Christian Democratic Centre	40,476	2.07	1
Altero Matteoli	839,001	40.05	1	Socialist Party	11,956	0.61	–
Altero Matteoli	839,001	40.05	1	Northern League Tuscany	11,256	0.57	–
Altero Matteoli	839,001	40.05	1	Tuscan Autonomist Movement	2,176	0.11	–
Altero Matteoli	839,001	40.05	1	The Liberals Sgarbi	853	0.04	–
Altero Matteoli	839,001	40.05	1	Total	794,555	40.58	15
Niccolò Pecorini	159,862	7.66	–	Communist Refoundation Party	131,471	6.71	2
Gianfranco Dell'Alba	49,358	2.36	–	Bonino List	40,496	2.07	–
Paolo Vecchi	12,950	0.62	–	Humanist Party	6,722	0.34	–
Total candidates	2,087,313	100.00	11	Total parties	1,958,141	100.00	39
Source: Ministry of the Interior – Historical Archive of Elections

== See also ==
- 2000 Italian regional elections
