= Legislature XIII of Italy =

13th legislature of the Italian Republic (1996–2001)

Legislature XIII of Italy XIII legislatura della Repubblica Italiana
- 13th legislature

Type
- Type: bicameral
- Houses: Chamber of Deputies; Senate of the Republic

History
- Founded: 9 May 1996
- Disbanded: 29 May 2001 (5 years, 20 days)
- Preceded by: XII Legislature
- Succeeded by: XIV Legislature

Leadership
- President of the Senate: Nicola Mancino, PPI since 9 May 1996
- President of the Chamber of Deputies: Luciano Violante, DS since 9 May 1996

Structure
- Seats: C: 630; S: 324 (315 + 9)
- Chamber of Deputies political groups: DS (161); FI (117); AN (88); Pop. Dem. (56); LN (46); Com (20); Dem (20); UDEUR (20); Mixed (94)
- Senate political groups: DS (102); FI (45); AN (42); PPI (25); LN (18); FdV (14); UDEUR (12); CCD (11); DE (10); Mixed (43)

Elections
- Chamber of Deputies voting system: Mattarellum
- Senate voting system: Mattarellum
- Last general election: 21 April 1996

Meeting place
- Palazzo Montecitorio, Rome (C)
- Palazzo Madama, Rome (S)

Website
- leg13.camera.it www.senato.it/leg13/home

Constitution
- Constitution of Italy

The Legislature XIII of Italy (Italian: XIII Legislatura della Repubblica Italiana) lasted from 9 May 1996 until 29 May 2001. Its composition was the one resulting from the general election of 21 April 1996. The election was called by President Scalfaro after the technocratic government of Lamberto Dini lost its support in the Parliament in 1995. President Scalfaro dissolved the houses of Parliament on 16 February 1996. The legislature ended after completing its five-year-long natural course, when President Ciampi dissolved the houses on 8 March 2001.

== Government ==
Prime Minister	Party	Term of office		Government	Composition
Prime Minister	Party	Took office	Left office	Government	Composition
Romano Prodi (b. 1939)	Independent	17 May 1996	21 October 1998	Prodi I	PDS • PPI • RI • FdV • UD (with PRC's external support) (The Olive Tree)
Massimo D'Alema (b. 1949)	Democrats of the Left	21 October 1998	18 December 1999	D'Alema I	DS • PPI • RI • SDI • FdV • PdCI • UDR (The Olive Tree)
Massimo D'Alema (b. 1949)	Democrats of the Left	18 December 1999	25 April 2000	D'Alema II	DS • PPI • Dem • RI • FdV • PdCI • UDEUR (The Olive Tree)
Giuliano Amato (b. 1938)	Independent	25 April 2000	11 June 2001	Amato II	DS • PPI • Dem • FdV • PdCI • UDEUR • RI • SDI (The Olive Tree)

== Composition ==
=== Chamber of Deputies ===
The number of elected deputies is 630. At the end of the legislature, eight seats remained vacant making the final total number of deputies 622. For these seats no by-election was planned, since they were left vacant less than a year before the natural end of the legislature.

- President: Luciano Violante (PDS), elected on 16 May 1996
- Vice Presidents: Lorenzo Acquarone (L'Ulivo), Pierluigi Petrini (Mixed), Alfredo Biondi (FI), Carlo Giovanardi (Mixed)

Parliamentary groups in the Chamber of Deputies
Initial composition		Final composition		
Parliamentary group	Seats	Parliamentary group	Seats	Change
Democrats of the Left – The Olive Tree	172	Democrats of the Left – The Olive Tree	161	▼11
Forza Italia	123	Forza Italia	117	▼6
National Alliance	92	National Alliance	88	▼4
Popular Democrats – The Olive Tree	67	Popular Democrats – The Olive Tree	56	▼11
Lega Nord Padania	59	Lega Nord Padania	46	▼13
Communist Refoundation – Progressives	35	Communist Group	20	▼15
CCD – Christian Democratic Centre	30			▼30
Italian Renewal	26			▼26
		The Democrats – The Olive Tree	20	▲20
		Union of Democrats for Europe	20	▲20
Mixed	26	Mixed	94	▲68
Federation of the Greens	14	Federation of the Greens	12	▼2
Linguistic Minorities	5	Linguistic Minorities	5	Steady
The Network – The Olive Tree	3			▼3
		Communist Refoundation – Progressives	14	▲14
		Christian Democratic Centre	12	▲12
		Italian Democratic Socialists	8	▲8
		Italian Renewal	6	▲6
		United Christian Democrats	6	▲6
		Liberal Democrat Federalists and Republicans	4	▲4
		Segni Pact – Reformers	3	▲3
Non inscrits	4	Non inscrits	24	▲20
Total seats	630	Total seats	622	▼8

=== Senate of the Republic ===
The number of elected senators is 315. At the beginning of the legislature there were 10 life senators (Giovanni Leone and Francesco Cossiga as former Presidents, and the nominated life senators Amintore Fanfani, Leo Valiani, Carlo Bo, Norberto Bobbio, Gianni Agnelli, Giulio Andreotti, Francesco De Martino and Paolo Emilio Taviani). After the deaths of Fanfani and Valiani, and the appointment of Scalfaro as life senator after the election of President Ciampi on 15 May 1999, the final number of life senators was of nine.

The total number of senators at the start of the legislature was of 325. At the end of it, two seats remained vacant because no by-elections could be held for vacancies appearing less than one year before the natural end of the legislature. Therefore, the total number of senators at the end of the legislature was of 322.

- President: Nicola Mancino (PPI), elected on 16 May 1996
- Vice Presidents: Carlo Rognoni (SD – L'Ulivo), Ersilia Salvato (PRC, then PDS), Domenico Constestabile (FI), Domenico Fisichella (AN)

Parliamentary groups in the Senate of the Republic
Initial composition		Final composition		
Parliamentary group	Seats	Parliamentary group	Seats	Change
Democratic Left – The Olive Tree	100	Democrats of the Left – The Olive Tree	102	▲2
Forza Italia	48	Forza Italia	45	▼3
National Alliance	43	National Alliance	42	▼1
Italian People's Party	31	Italian People's Party	25	▼6
Lega	27	Lega Nord Padania	18	▼9
Christian Democratic Federation – CCD	15	Christian Democratic Centre	11	▼4
Greens – The Olive Tree	14	Greens – The Olive Tree	14	Steady
Christian Democratic Federation – CDU	10	Union of Democrats for Europe	12	▲2
Communist Refoundation – Progressives	11			▼11
Italian Renewal	11			▼11
		European Democracy	10	▲10
Mixed	15	Mixed	43	▲28
Linguistic Minorities	3	Linguistic Minorities	3	Steady
Sardinian Action Party	1	Sardinian Action Party	1	Steady
League of the Regions	1	League of the Regions	1	Steady
Tricolour Flame	1	Tricolour Flame	1	Steady
The Network – The Olive Tree	1			▼1
		Communist Group	6	▲6
		Italian Renewal	6	▲6
		The Democrats	5	▲5
		Communist Refoundation – Progressives	3	▲3
		Italian Democratic Socialists	3	▲3
		Reforming Centre	2	▲2
		Pannella List	1	▲1
		Democratic People's Union	1	▲1
		United Christian Democrats	1	▲1
		Italy of Values	1	▲1
Non inscrits	8	Non inscrits	8	Steady
Total seats	325	Total seats	322	▼3

Note

- Of the 315 elected senators, 10 Senators for life were added at the beginning of the term distributed as follows:
- 4 from the group Partito Popolare Italiano: Giulio Andreotti (nel 2001 passato al gruppo Democrazia Europea), Carlo Bo, Amintore Fanfani (died in 1999), Paolo Emilio Taviani.
- 2 from the group Sinistra Democratica – L'Ulivo: Norberto Bobbio, Francesco De Martino.
- 4 with no affiliation: Gianni Agnelli, Francesco Cossiga, Giovanni Leone, Leo Valiani (died in 1999). Nel 1999 Oscar Luigi Scalfaro.

==== Senators for Life ====
Senator	Motivation	Appointed by	From	Till
Amintore Fanfani	Merits in the social field	President Giovanni Leone	Previous legislature	20 November 1999 (deceased)
Giovanni Leone	Former president of Italy	ex officio	Previous legislature	Next legislature
Leo Valiani	Merits in the social field	President Sandro Pertini	Previous legislature	18 September 1999 (deceased)
Carlo Bo	Merits in the literary field	President Sandro Pertini	Previous legislature	Next legislature
Norberto Bobbio	Merits in the social and scientific field	President Sandro Pertini	Previous legislature	Next legislature
Gianni Agnelli	Merits in the social field	President Francesco Cossiga	Previous legislature	Next legislature
Giulio Andreotti	Merits in the social field	President Francesco Cossiga	Previous legislature	Next legislature
Francesco De Martino	Merits in the social field	President Francesco Cossiga	Previous legislature	Next legislature
Paolo Emilio Taviani	Merits in the social field	President Francesco Cossiga	Previous legislature	Next legislature
Francesco Cossiga	Former president of Italy	ex officio	Previous legislature	Next legislature
Oscar Luigi Scalfaro	Former president of Italy	ex officio	15 May 1999	Next legislature
