= Italian Socialists =

Italian Socialists Socialisti Italiani
- Abbreviation: SI
- Leader: Enrico Boselli
- Founded: 13 November 1994
- Dissolved: 10 May 1998
- Preceded by: Italian Socialist Party
- Merged into: Italian Democratic Socialists
- Youth wing: Federation of Young Socialists
- Ideology: Social democracy
- Political position: Centre-left
- National affiliation: Pact of Democrats (1995–96); Italian Renewal (1996); The Olive Tree (1996–98)
- International affiliation: Socialist International
- Max. number of seats (Chamber of Deputies): 7 / 630 (1996)
- Max. number of seats (Senate): 5 / 315 (1996)

The Italian Socialists (Italian: Socialisti Italiani, SI) were a minor social-democratic political party in Italy active from 1994 to 1998. The party was the legal successor of the Italian Socialist Party (PSI), following its dissolution by the 47th Party Congress due to the severe financial crisis following the Tangentopoli scandal. A minoritarian group of the congress, who proposed an autonomist and centrist solution against the PSI dissolution, instead founded the Reformist Socialist Party.

== History ==
=== Crisis of the Italian Socialist Party ===
==== 1994 general election ====
In occasion of the 1994 general election and the introduction of the majoritarian electoral system of "Mattarellum", the Italian Socialist Party (PSI) of Ottaviano Del Turco joined the Alliance of Progressives coalition; however, the PSI obtained poor results compared to the main parties of the coalition: PSI received 2.2% of votes in the proportional quota for the Chamber of Deputies and the 0.3% for the Senate. However, PSI parliamentarians were elected in single-members districts according to the agreements within the centre-left coalition and, thanks to the majoritarian system, obtained 14 seats in the Chamber and 9 in the Senate.

Due to their number, PSI deputies were forced to join the unitarian centre-left group "Progressives - Federative" (Progressisti - Federativo) while PSI senators managed to create their own autonomous group, thanks also to the adhesion of the Senator for life and former PSI National Secretary Francesco De Martino.

==== Exit of the Labourist faction from PSI ====
After the disappointing outcome of the elections, Del Turco resigned as secretary and the PSI Directive Committee appointed Valdo Spini as national coordinator on 21 June 1994, giving him the task to organise the Extraordinary Congress of the Party until September of the same year.

However, Spini was convinced that PSI had to change its entire identity, which was associated with corruption after the role of the party in the Tangentopoli scandal, and he convened a meeting on 26 July 1994 to promote the "Labourist Constituent". On 22 September, Spini resigned as coordinator and formed the Labour Federation on 5 November 1994 in Florence and much of parliamentarians, who were elected among Socialist lists, joined this new political formation and left the PSI, deepening its financial crisis.

==== Last PSI Congress ====
In a climate of high tension, the 47th Congress of the Italian Socialist Party was held in Rome in November 1994 and saw the participation of Socialist delegates who decided to not follow Spini into his new Labour Federation party.

The majoritarian side of the Congress, which was supported by former PSI Secretary Ottaviano Del Turco and Enrico Boselli, proposed the liquidation of the Party due to its disastrous financial situation and the creation create a new political formation called "Socialisti Italiani". The minoritarian side, supported by Fabrizio Cicchitto and Enrico Manca, was opposed to the dissolution of the PSI.

At the end, the congress decided to liquidate the PSI, considering the debts accumulated during the rule of former Prime Minister Bettino Craxi and the decline of subscriptions and contributions which led to the foreclosing of various properties belonging to the party.

=== Foundation of Italian Socialists ===
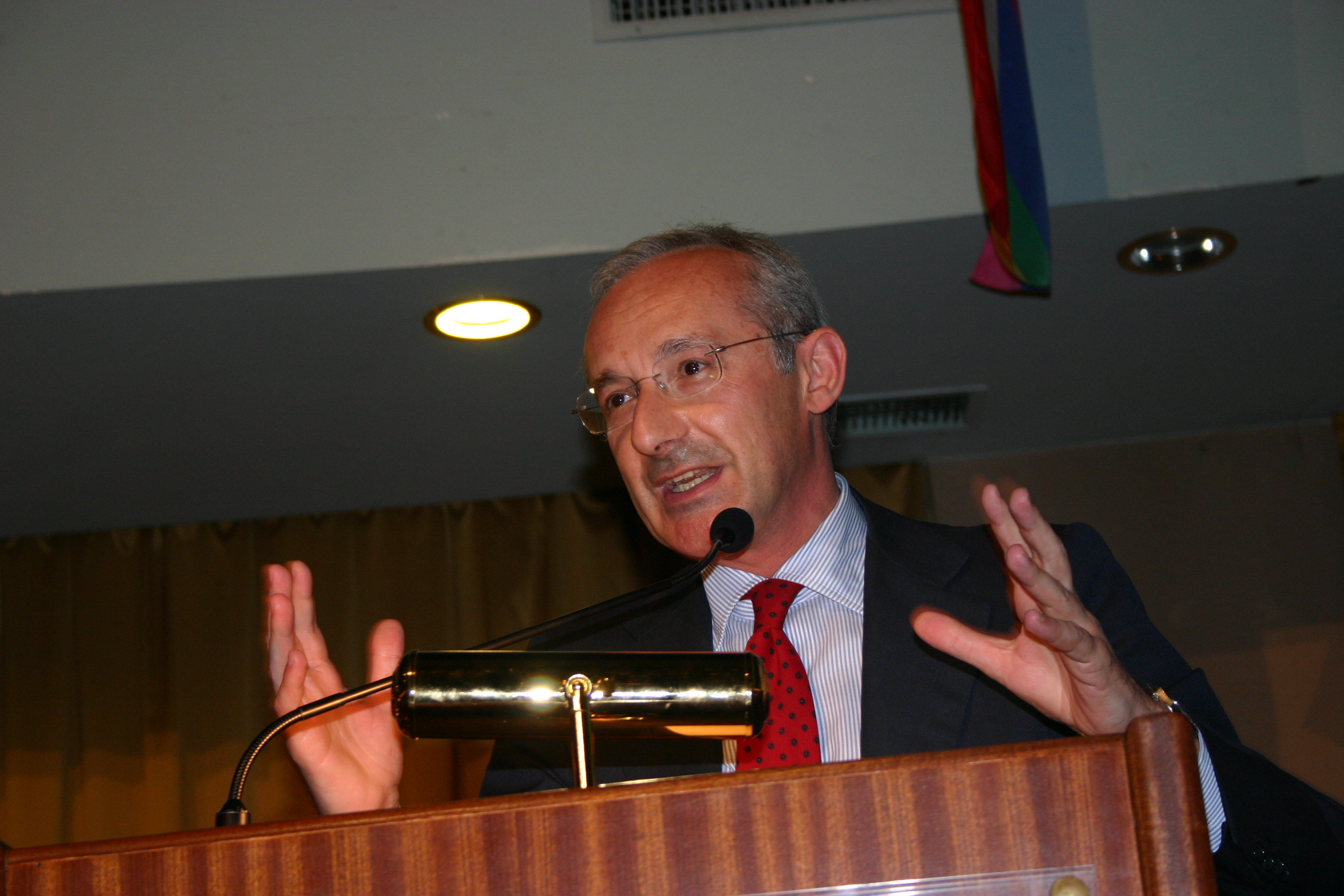
Enrico Boselli in 2007.

Despite the sadness for the closure of the historical Italian Socialist Party after 102 years of activity, all delegates wanted to continue and preserve the history and the identity of PSI: after a few hours, the new "Italian Socialists" (SI) was proclaimed as the official successor party to the PSI and its traditions. Delegates of the new party elected Enrico Boselli as Secretary and Gino Giugni as President, with the indication to keep the party among the democratic left.

At the Chamber, 11 deputies, of whom 9 elected for the PSI, joined the Labour Federation; the five remaining PSI deputies (Giuseppe Albertini, Enrico Boselli, Ottaviano Del Turco, Gino Giugni and Alberto La Volpe) decided instead to join the Italian Socialists. They left the "Progressives" parliamentary group and formed a united group called "The Democrats" (I Democratici) on 21 February 1995, along with some members of the Segni Pact and Democratic Alliance.

At the Senate, the Socialist group was preserved but most of its members joined the Labour Federations, and only senators Maria Rosaria Manieri and Cesare Marini adhered to SI.

=== First elections ===
At the 1995 regional elections, the Italian Socialists formed a list with the Democratic Alliance and Segni Pact called the Pact of Democrats. The coalition obtained 4.2% of the vote and 33 regional councillors, mostly Socialists. However, the alliance was dissolved shortly after the election due to the good results achieved only by SI.

For the 1996 general election, the Italian Socialists joined the electoral list of Italian Renewal (RI), a newly formed liberal-centrist party led by Lamberto Dini, within The Olive Tree centre-left coalition. SI participated then to the electoral victory of the centre-left: RI obtained the 4.3% of vote for the Chamber while The Olive Tree list obtained the 39.9% of votes for the Senate.

The Italian Socialists had 7 deputies (Giuseppe Albertini, Enrico Boselli, Enzo Ceremigna, Giovanni Crema, Leone Delfino, Sergio Fumagalli and Roberto Villetti) and 5 senators (Livio Besso Cordero, Ottaviano Del Turco, Giovanni Iuliano, Maria Rosaria Manieri and Cesare Marini). Del Turco was nominated as the group's senate leader.

However, the federation with RI did not last long, disbanding on 21 December 1996, with the exit from the parliamentarian group in the Chamber by Socialist deputies, who joined the component of Italian Socialists in the Mixed Group.

Socialist senators in turn left the parliamentarian group of the Senate on 6 February 1997, determining the dissolution of RI. They instead joined the Mixed Group the Senate, forming the component of Italian Socialists and the one of "Italian Democratic Socialists" (SDI) on 9 November 1998.

=== Merger with the SDI ===
On 10 May 1998 and under the proposal of Party Secretary Boselli, the Italian Socialists merged with the SDI, along with a segment of the Socialist Party (led by Ugo Intini), Labour Federation (led by Alberto Benzoni) and the remains of the Italian Democratic Socialist Party (led by Gianfranco Schietroma).

== Leadership ==
- Secretary: Enrico Boselli (1994–1998)
  - Deputy-Secretary: Roberto Villetti (1994–1998)
- President: Gino Giugni (1994–1996), Ottaviano Del Turco (1996–1998)

== See also ==
- Italian Socialist Party
- Socialism in Italy
