= The Democrats (Italy) =

The Democrats I Democratici
- President: Romano Prodi (1999); Arturo Parisi (1999–2002)
- Founded: 27 February 1999
- Dissolved: 23 March 2002
- Merger of: Democratic Union; Italy of Values; The Network
- Merged into: Democracy is Freedom – The Daisy
- Headquarters: Piazza dei Santi Apostoli, 73; Rome, Italy
- Ideology: Social liberalism Christian left Social democracy
- Political position: Centre to centre-left
- National affiliation: The Olive Tree
- European affiliation: European Liberal Democrat and Reform Party
- European Parliament group: European Liberal Democrat and Reform Party Group
- Colours: Orange Light blue

The Democrats (Italian: I Democratici, Dem) was a centrist and social-liberal political party in Italy.

The party was launched in 1999 by Romano Prodi, a few months after his dismissal as Prime Minister and leader of The Olive Tree coalition. Three parties merged into The Democrats: the Democratic Union, Italy of Values and The Network. Also splinters from the Italian People's Party joined. In 2002 The Democrats were merged into Democracy is Freedom – The Daisy, which would be merged into the Democratic Party in 2007.

== History ==
Early groups of "Olivists" were formed in 1995–1996, during the campaign for the 1996 general election, by close supporters of Prodi who were not members of any party of The Olive Tree coalition, like Prodi himself. "Clubs for Prodi" and the "Citizens for The Olive Tree" association were organised. Although most Olivists took part in the campaign only as activists, some were elected with the Populars for Prodi list, whose main constituent parties were the Christian-democratic Italian People's Party (PPI) and the social-liberal Democratic Union (UD). The Olive Tree won the election, the PPI–UD joint list obtained 6.8% of the vote, and Prodi was sworn in as Prime Minister, at the head of the Prodi I Cabinet.

After being ousted as Prime Minister and replaced by Massimo D'Alema (leader of the Democrats of the Left) in November 1998, Prodi launched the new party in February 1999. The Democrats were joined by PPI splinters, grassroots activists, the UD (leader: Antonio Maccanico), The Network (leader: Leoluca Orlando), Italy of Values (leader: Antonio Di Pietro) – which would be re-established as an independent party in May 2000 –, and the so-called "Movement of Mayors" (leaders: Francesco Rutelli, a former Green, and Massimo Cacciari, a former Democrat of the Left).

After a few months after the party's foundation, Prodi gave way to his close associate Arturo Parisi as president.

Prodi led The Democrats to a good result in the 1999 European Parliament election (7.7%), much more than the PPI (4.3%). Six Democratic MEPs were elected: Cacciari, Di Pietro, Rutelli, Paolo Costa, Pietro Mennea and Giovanni Procacci. In September Prodi was appointed President of the European Commission.

In December 1999 the party joined D'Alema II Cabinet with four ministers: Maccanico as minister of Institutional Reforms, Enzo Bianco (who had missed the election as MEP for a few votes) minister of the Interior, Willer Bordon ministers of Public Works, and Paolo De Castro minister of Agriculture. Of these, all but the latter would be confirmed in Amato II Cabinet, which was formed in April 2000, after the coalition's defeat in the regional elections.

In early 2000 Parisi asked the Democrats of the Left, then led by Walter Veltroni, to dissolve into a new "Democratic Party". The proposal was not received, thus in October 2000 The Democrats agreed with the PPI, Italian Renewal and the Union of Democrats for Europe to form a joint list for the 2001 general election, under the leadership of Rutelli, who was also The Olive Tree's "candidate for Prime Minister". The list, which gained a considerable success (14.5%), was transformed into a party in March 2002 under the name of Democracy is Freedom – The Daisy. This party, led by Rutelli, would be eventually merged into the Democratic Party in October 2007.

== Ideology ==
Several party members were either former Christian Democrats (Prodi, Parisi, Costa, Orlando, etc.), while several others were formerly affiliated to the Italian Republican Party (Maccanico, Bianco, etc.). The ideology of the party thus ranged from Prodi's "social Catholicism" to Rutelli's and the former Republicans' social liberalism, Di Pietro's populism and social democracy. At the European level, The Democrats were affiliated to the European Liberal Democrat and Reform Party.

The party was fervently "Olivist" (that is to say interested in the creation of a more united centre-left and, possibly, a joint centre-left party) and Europeanist, while also favouring the establishment of a two-party system. The name and symbol of the party were a direct reference to the Democratic Party of the United States.

== Electoral results ==
=== Italian Parliament ===
Chamber of Deputies
| Election year | Votes | % | Seats | +/− | Leader |
| 2001 | In Democracy is Freedom – The Daisy | | 23 / 630 | – | Romano Prodi |

Senate of the Republic
| Election year | Votes | % | Seats | +/− | Leader |
| 2001 | In the Olive Tree | | 9 / 315 | – | Romano Prodi |

=== European Parliament ===
European Parliament
| Election year | Votes | % | Seats | +/− | Leader |
| 1999 | 2,402,435 (5th) | 7.7 | 6 / 87 | – | Romano Prodi |

== Leadership ==
- President: Romano Prodi (1999), Arturo Parisi (1999–2002)
