= Liberal Democratic Pole =

Liberal Democratic Pole Polo Liberal Democratico
- Leader: Adriano Teso
- Founded: 3 February 1994
- Dissolved: 1994
- Split from: Segni Pact
- Merged into: Forza Italia
- Ideology: Liberalism
- Political position: Centre-right
- National affiliation: Pole of Good Government (1994)

The Liberal Democratic Pole (Italian: Polo Liberal Democratico, PLD) was a liberal political party in Italy active during 1994.

The PLD was founded by Adriano Teso and Carlo Usiglio, who had left the Segni Pact with the aim of creating a centre-right alliance. The party was a member of the Pole of Freedoms alliance.

In the 1994 general election Teso and Usiglio were elected in the Chamber of Deputies with the Pole of Freedoms. Instead the PLD presented itself in the colleges where was present the Pole of Good Government.

After the 1994 general election Teso was nominated Undersecretary for Labour and Social Security in the Berlusconi I Cabinet, and the party merged into Forza Italia.
