= Besso =

Besso is the name of:

- Besso Udessiani (born 1978), Georgian rugby union player
- Livio Besso Cordero (1948–2018), Italian politician
- Michele Besso (1873–1955), Swiss-Italian engineer

== See also ==
- Besso, Ticino, suburb of the city of Lugano in the Swiss canton of Ticino
- Besso (mountain), mountain of the Pennine Alps in the Swiss canton of Valais
