= Socialist Party (Italy, 1996) =

Italian political party (1996–2001)

Socialist Party Partito Socialista
- Secretary: Ugo Intini (1996–1998); Gianni De Michelis (1998–2001)
- Coordinator: Fabrizio Cicchitto
- Founded: 24 February 1996
- Dissolved: 20 January 2001
- Merger of: Reformist Socialist Party; Liberal Socialist Movement
- Merged into: New Italian Socialist Party
- Headquarters: Via di Torre Argentina, 47; 00186 Rome
- Membership (1996): 46,000
- Ideology: Social democracy
- Political position: Centre
- National affiliation: Pole for Freedoms (1999–2001)

The Socialist Party (Italian: Partito Socialista, PS) was a minor social-democratic political party in Italy.

The party was founded in 1996 by a group of former members of the Italian Socialist Party (PSI) who had been close allies of Bettino Craxi, former Prime Minister of Italy and leader of the PSI from 1976 to 1992, and who did not join the Italian Socialists of Enrico Boselli. They included Ugo Intini, Enrico Manca, Gianni De Michelis, Fabrizio Cicchitto, Margherita Boniver, Donato Robilotta and Craxi's son, Bobo.

In 2000, the Movement of Social Democratic Rebirth of Luigi Preti also joined the PS, that changed its name to Socialist Party – Social Democracy (Partito Socialista – Socialdemocrazia), even if the two parties never formally merged.

In 2001, the PS merged with the Socialist League and other splinter groups from the SDI to form the New Italian Socialist Party. De Michelis was elected secretary of the new party upon its foundation, which was viewed by many as the direct continuation of the PS, which joined the House of Freedoms coalition.

== History ==
=== Formation under Intini ===
After the dissolution of the Italian Socialist Party (PSI), due in part to the Mani pulite scandal, Ugo Intini and other fellow leaders founded the Socialist Party (PS) on 24 February 1996 in order to represent the ideas of the former party. Bettino Craxi, the last PSI Secretary, did not approve the project and considered it as a wrong move, but Intini stated that he was trying to refound a new socialist party and not the craxist one. The PS participated independently to the 1996 general election; however, the Ministry of Interior forced the party to change its name and symbol, in order to avoid confusion with the old PSI. The Socialist Party, presented as "Socialists" with seven stars and five red carnations, obtained poor results: 149,441 (0.4%) votes in the proportional system for the Chamber of Deputies and 286,425 (0.9%) for the Senate.

At the 1996 Sicilian regional election, the PS obtained almost 50,000 votes (1.9%) and 3 seats out 90. The three deputies elected for the Sicilian Regional Assembly were Salvatore Cintola in Palermo (who would leave the party a few years later), Giovanni Ricevuto in Messina and Nunzio Calanna in Catania.

On 6 July 1996, the PS constituent process began: despite the majoritarian presence of Craxi supporters in the party, Intini warned that the new party would not be "the party of orphans neither of Bettino's avengers". Intini worked in order to achieve alliance with socialists of other parties who were under the influence of the Democratic Party of the Left (PDS).

On 29 and 30 October 1996, the I Programmatic Conference was held and it was followed by the I National Congress in the following month. Meanwhile, on 2 November, a PS delegation went in Hammamet, Tunisia, to meet Craxi: the former leader of PSI welcomed the delegation behind closed doors but said to press that he would not contribute to the re-establishment of PSI but he would give only advice. Intini remained in Italy and confirmed his will to rebuild a Socialist Party that should not be Craxist or guided from Hammamet.

At the Congress, about 26 thousands subscribers took part but there were divisions among Craxi supporters, and those who wanted to step away from Craxi. Ugo Intini was appointed as secretary with Fabrizio Cicchitto as Coordinator.

At the beginning of 1997, Intini and Boselli worked in order to collaborate for the next election, aiming to reunite PS with Enrico Boselli's Italian Socialists, the PSI's official successor party. On 18 March, a united list, Socialisti Italiani Uniti, was announced for the 1997 administrative elections: Intini and Boselli presented themselves as leaders of the list for communal elections of Milan. SIU obtained the 7,337 (1,13%) of votes and Craxi expressed his disagreement against the project through a fax sent to Avanti!. Therefore, the argument between Craxi-Intini/Boselli became more vigorous.

=== PS under De Michelis ===
When in July 1997 it became clear that PDS was aiming to merge with other parties in order to create a new larger party, later known as the Democrats of the Left, Intini and Boselli confirmed their own autonomy and their struggle to reach a united socialist force.

The PS was then polarised around two distinct sides: one was near to the secretary and the merger project with Italian Socialists (SI) of Boselli, another one was close to Gianni De Michelis who refused the relationship with the party of Boselli in the absence of a split-up between SI and PDS of Massimo D'Alema.

Intini wanted to decide all during a congress to be held until the end of 1997, but supporters of De Michelis enforced an earlier date. A meeting of the National Direction was held on 13 September 1997 and Intini was replaced by De Michelis with 37 votes out of 62. Intini stated:

The truth is that, outside of the contingent smoke screens, they want to go with the right.

— Ugo Intini

Later, De Michelis confirmed his intent to approach the centre-right coalition in order to collaborate with Silvio Berlusconi, leader of Forza Italia and the Pole of Freedoms along with Umberto Bossi of Lega Nord.

According to Intini, the meeting which dismissed him was illegitimate because Intini had cancelled it on the day before in order to pander the request of nine regional secretaries (Lombardy, Veneto, Tuscany, Lazio, Sardinia, Abruzzo, Apulia, Calabria and Sicily). But De Michelis stated that the meeting was legitimate because it was convened anyway by the majority of members of PS Secretary.

The PS split definitively on 26 September 1997, when the Intini loyalists convened and claimed to be the only legitimate Socialist Party. De Michelis confirmed his political line on the next day: he aimed to recreate the PSI, stay neutral at the administrative elections but support the centre-right coalition at the supplementary elections of Mugello.

In February 1998, the side of PS close to Intini and Manca merged with the Italian Socialists of Boselli and the Italian Democratic Socialist Party, founding the Italian Democratic Socialists (SDI). The PS was then definitively under the control of De Michelis.

On 20 June 1998 De Michelis announced that a PSI card would be sent to Craxi. A few weeks later the 2nd National Congress was held in which Silvio Berlusconi took part, demonstrating the close relationship of the PS to the centre-right, although the PS had however a certain interest towards the new Democratic Union for the Republic led by Francesco Cossiga.

On 31 October 1998, Intini proposed the creation of a united SDI-PS electoral list for the 1999 European elections, but the PS opposed. However, Bobo Craxi, son of Bettino, was going to accept the invitation from SDI. At the end, after a meeting between SDI leaders and Bettino Craxi, the son Bobo presented himself with the party of Boselli in the district of Southern Italy, placed second on the list next to the secretary.

On 9 January 1999, Paris Dell'Unto left the PS together with other members after the decision to make an alliance between the party and the National Alliance for the administrative elections.

The PS participated to the 1999 European elections in an own list among the district of Sicily-Sardinia, obtaining over 42,000 votes (1.4%) but without managing to elect any of its candidates.

On 22 June 1999, after the European elections had concluded, some socialists including Cicchitto and Boniver left the party and joined Forza Italia.

=== New PSI ===
After long periods of low visibility, the direction promoted the establishment of a new party. In 2001, the New Italian Socialist Party (NPSI) was founded after the merger between PS and the Socialist League, which was created by Bobo Craxi and Claudio Martelli after they had left the SDI one year before. The NPSI joined the House of Freedoms coalition of Silvio Berlusconi.

== Leadership ==
- Secretary: Ugo Intini (1996–1997), Gianni De Michelis (1997–2001)
- Coordinator: Fabrizio Cicchitto (1996–1999)

== National Congresses ==
- 1st Congress – Rome, 30 November – 1 December 1996
- 2nd Congress – Rome, 4–5 July 1998
- 3rd Congress – Rome, 10–11 April 1999
- 4th Congress – Rome, 19–20 November 1999

== Elections ==
Results
Election	Parliament	Votes	%	Seats
1996 general election	Chamber of Deputies Senate of the Republic	149,441 286,425	0.40 0.88	0 0
1999 European elections	European Parliament	42,500	0.14	0

== See also ==
- Ugo Intini
- Enrico Boselli
- Gianni De Michelis
- Bettino Craxi
- Italian Socialist Party
- Italian Socialists
- New Italian Socialist Party
