= Democratic Italian Movement =

Political party in Italy

The Democratic Italian Movement (Italian: Movimento Italiano Democratico, MID) was a political party in Italy.

The MID was founded in February 1995 by Sergio Berlinguer, a former diplomat who had been minister for Italians abroad in Berlusconi I Cabinet.

A few months later the party formed a federation with the United Christian Democrats and in the run-up of the 1996 general election it was finally merged with Italian Renewal (RI), led by another former minister under Berlusconi, Lamberto Dini. In the election two MID members, Aldo Brancati and Giovanni Bruni were elected to the Chamber of Deputies and the Senate, respectively, but both of them soon left RI (Brancati finally joined the Democrats of the Left, while Bruni Forza Italia).
