= Liberal Socialist Movement =

Italian political party

Liberal Socialist Movement Movimento Liberal Socialista
- Leader: Ugo Intini
- Founded: 28 January 1994
- Dissolved: 24 February 1996
- Split from: Italian Socialist Party
- Merged into: Socialist Party
- Newspaper: Non mollare
- Ideology: Social democracy Liberal socialism
- Political position: Centre

The Liberal Socialist Movement (Italian: Movimento Liberal Socialista, MLS), called until 18 December 1994 the Federation of Socialists (Federazione dei Socialisti), was a social-democratic political party in Italy.

In January 1994 the Italian Socialist Party (PSI), severely hit by the Tangentopoli scandals, was in disarray. The new party secretary, Ottaviano Del Turco, led the party into the Alliance of Progressives, a left-wing coalition dominated by the post-communist Democratic Party of the Left (PDS), but a group of dissidents disagreed. On 28 January they left the PSI and formed the FDS The new party included Franco Piro (secretary), Margherita Boniver (president), Ugo Intini and Maurizio Sacconi.

In the 1994 general election the FdS formed a joint list ("Social Democracy for Freedoms") with the Italian Democratic Socialist Party (PSDI), led by Enrico Ferri, and some independents, notably including Dacia Valent. The list obtained a mere 0.5% of the vote. In 1996 he FDS was merged into the new Socialist Party (PS). Many leading members of the party (Boniver, Sacconi, etc.) later entered Silvio Berlusconi's Forza Italia, while others (Piro, Intini, etc.) were founding members of the New Italian Socialist Party (NPSI) in 2001.
