= Enrico Manca =

Italian politician (1931–2011)

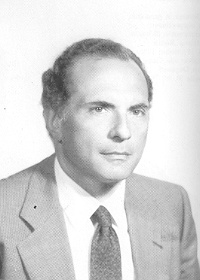

Minister of Foreign Trade
- In office 4 April 1980 – 26 May 1981
- Prime Minister: Francesco Cossiga; Arnaldo Forlani
- Preceded by: Gaetano Stammati
- Succeeded by: Nicola Capria

Member of the Chamber of Deputies
- In office 25 May 1972 – 4 December 1986
- Constituency: Perugia
- In office 2 July 1987 – 4 August 1987
- Constituency: Perugia
- In office 23 April 1992 – 14 April 1994
- Constituency: Perugia

Personal details
- Born: 27 November 1931 Rome, Italy
- Died: 5 July 2011 (aged 79) Rome, Italy
- Party: PSI (until 1994); PSR (1994–1996); PS (1996–1998); SDI (1998–2002); DL (2002–2007); PD (2007–2011)
- Profession: Politician, journalist

Enrico Manca (27 November 1931 – 5 July 2011) was an Italian politician.

== Biography ==
Marca was born in Rome and graduated with a degree in law from the Sapienza University of Rome. In 1959, Manca joined the Italian state broadcaster RAI and from 1961 to 1972 was editor of Giornale Radio Rai, central editor of the TV news, and director of cultural television services. A member of the Italian Socialist Party (PSI), he was elected a deputy for the first time in 1972 and served as Minister of Foreign Trade in the Cossiga II Cabinet and in the Forlani Cabinet. His name was found on the lists of members of the Propaganda Due (P2) Masonic lodge (card number 864) in 1981, although Manca himself repeatedly denied any adherence to the lodge.

On 4 December 1986, he resigned as a deputy due to a conflict of interests, having agreed that year to serve as the next president of RAI. He was re-elected in 1987 but again had to resign due to the incompatibility that arose from his new position. He was the head of RAI until 1992 when he returned to parliament having been once again re-elected as a Deputy. In 1994, Manca founded the Reformist Socialist Party (PRS) with his PSI colleague and erstwhile P2 member Fabrizio Cicchitto, where he remained until 1996 when he joined the Socialist Party (PS). Later, he became a member of the Italian Democratic Socialists (SDI) and in 2002 of The Daisy (DL). In 2007, he joined the Democratic Party (PD), in which he remained a member until his death in 2011.
