= Pole of Good Government =

Italian political alliance

Pole of Good Government Polo del Buon Governo
- Leader: Silvio Berlusconi; Gianfranco Fini
- Founded: 1994
- Dissolved: 1995
- Succeeded by: Pole for Freedoms
- Ideology: Christian democracy National conservatism Liberalism
- Political position: Centre-right to right-wing
- National affiliation: with Pole of Freedoms; Centre-right coalition

The Pole of Good Government (Italian: Polo del Buon Governo) was a centre-right electoral, and later political alliance in Italy, launched at the 1994 general election by Silvio Berlusconi. Its counterpart in Northern Italy was the Pole of Freedoms, both forming the first incarnation of the centre-right coalition.

== History ==
The alliance was composed primarily of Forza Italia (FI) and the National Alliance (AN), while also including the Christian Democratic Centre (CCD), Union of the Centre (UdC) and Liberal Democratic Pole (PLD). The Pole of Good Government was present only in most of Southern Italy, while the Pole of Freedoms, composed of Forza Italia and the Lega Nord, without the National Alliance, was present in Northern Italy.

The term "Pole of Good Government" (as that of "Pole of Freedoms") had no official character: the logo that identified the coalition included just the symbols of the lists that were part of the alliance (furthermore, this symbol was only present for the election of the Senate). However, this alliance resulted stronger than its Northern counterpart: it run in the 1994 Italian local elections in all the country and consequently against the League in Northern Italy.

After the fall of the Berlusconi I Cabinet because of disagreements with the Lega Nord, the alliance ended. In its place, Forza Italia, the National Alliance and Christian Democratic Centre formed another alliance, the Pole for Freedoms, which in 2000, after the re-entry of Lega Nord, was renamed House of Freedoms.

== Composition ==
It was initially composed of the following political parties:

Party	Ideology	Leader
Forza Italia (FI)	Liberal conservatism	Silvio Berlusconi
National Alliance-Italian Social Movement (AN-MSI)	National conservatism	Gianfranco Fini
Christian Democratic Centre (CCD)	Christian democracy	Pier Ferdinando Casini
Union of the Centre (UdC)	Liberalism	Raffaele Costa
Liberal Democratic Pole (PLD)	Liberalism	Adriano Teso

== Election results ==
Election	Leader	Chamber of Deputies		
Election	Leader	Votes	%	Seats
1994	Silvio Berlusconi	5,732,890	14.89	129 / 475

Election	Leader	Senate of the Republic		
Election	Leader	Votes	%	Seats
1994	Silvio Berlusconi	4,544,573	13.74	64 / 315
