= Ugo Intini =

Italian journalist and politician (1941–2024)

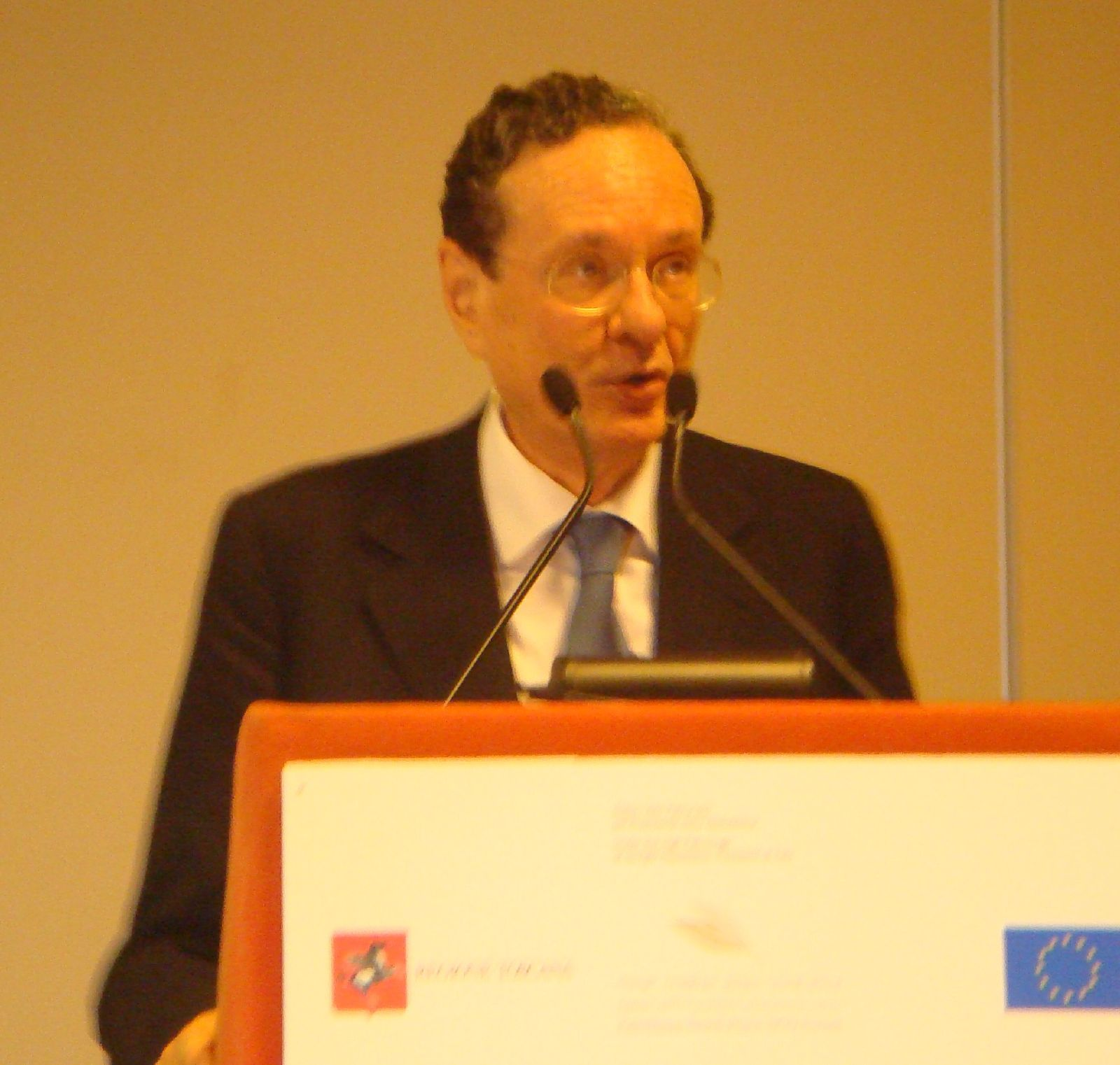
- Intini in 2007

Member of the Chamber of Deputies
- In office 30 May 2001 – 27 April 2006
- Constituency: Genoa
- In office 12 July 1983 – 14 April 1994
- Constituency: Genoa

Personal details
- Born: 30 June 1941 Milan, Italy
- Died: 12 February 2024 (aged 82) Milan, Italy
- Party: PSI (1983–1994); MLS (1994–1996); PS (1996–1998); SDI (1998–2007); PSI (2007–2024)
- Profession: Politician, journalist

Ugo Intini (30 June 1941 – 12 February 2024) was an Italian journalist and politician.

== Political career ==
A long-time member of the Italian Socialist Party (PSI) and close aide of Bettino Craxi, Intini was spokesman of the PSI and representative of the party in the Socialist International. He founded the Socialist Party (PS) in 1996 and joined the Italian Democratic Socialists (SDI) in 1998. Intini led the electoral list of PSI in the region Liguria after Sandro Pertini and was elected three times in the Chamber of Deputies from 1983 to 1994. In 2001, he was elected again a deputy in the single-member district of East Genoa, a position he maintained until 2006. He served twice in the centre-left coalition-led government: from 2000 to 2001 as undersecretary to the Foreign Affairs and from 2006 to 2008 as Deputy Minister.

From 1981 to 1987, Intini was editor of Avanti!, the daily newspaper of the PSI. Among his many books, there is a history of this newspaper, whose editors were Leonida Bissolati, Benito Mussolini, Antonio Gramsci, Pietro Nenni, Giuseppe Saragat, Pertini, and Craxi. Intini died on 12 February 2024 at the age of 82.

== Electoral history ==
Election	House	Constituency	Party	Votes	Result
1983	Chamber of Deputies	Genoa–Imperia–La Spezia–Savona	PSI	28,808	Elected
1987	Chamber of Deputies	Genoa–Imperia–La Spezia–Savona	PSI	27,612	Elected
1992	Chamber of Deputies	Genoa–Imperia–La Spezia–Savona	PSI	30,758	Elected
2001	Chamber of Deputies	Genoa – Sestri	SDI	46,882	Elected
