= Reformist Socialist Party =

Reformist Socialist Party Partito Socialista Riformista
- President: Enrico Manca
- Secretary: Fabrizio Cicchitto
- Founded: 13 November 1994
- Dissolved: 31 January 1996
- Split from: Italian Socialist Party
- Merged into: Socialist Party
- Ideology: Social democracy
- Political position: Centre

The Reformist Socialist Party (Partito Socialista Riformista, PSR) was a minor social-democratic political party in Italy.

It was founded after the Tangentopoli scandal, in opposition to the decision of Ottaviano Del Turco, then secretary of the Italian Socialist Party (PSI), to place it within the centre-left Alliance of Progressives coalition, dominated by the Democratic Party of the Left. Its leading members included Fabrizio Cicchitto and Enrico Manca. The party merged into the Socialist Party in 1996.

Fabrizio Cicchitto, who was once a left-winger close to Riccardo Lombardi in the old PSI, became the deputy-coordinator of Forza Italia and later a member of The People of Freedom, while Enrico Manca, who had been a centrist linked to Bettino Craxi, joined Democracy is Freedom – The Daisy in 2004 and the Democratic Party, remaining there until his death in 2011.

== Leadership ==
- Secretary: Fabrizio Cicchitto (1994–1996)
- President: Enrico Manca (1994–1996)

== See also ==
- Italian Reformist Socialist Party
