= 1996 Italian general election =

- 21 April 1996

All 630 seats in the Chamber of Deputies 316 seats needed for a majority 315 seats in the Senate 163 seats needed for a majority (Note: taking into account the Senators for life, which accounted for 10 seats at the time the election took place)
- Registered: 48,744,846 (C) · 42,889,825 (S)
- Turnout: 40,401,774 (C) · 82.9% (▼3.4 pp); 35,260,803 (S) · 82.2% (▼3.6 pp)
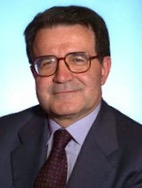

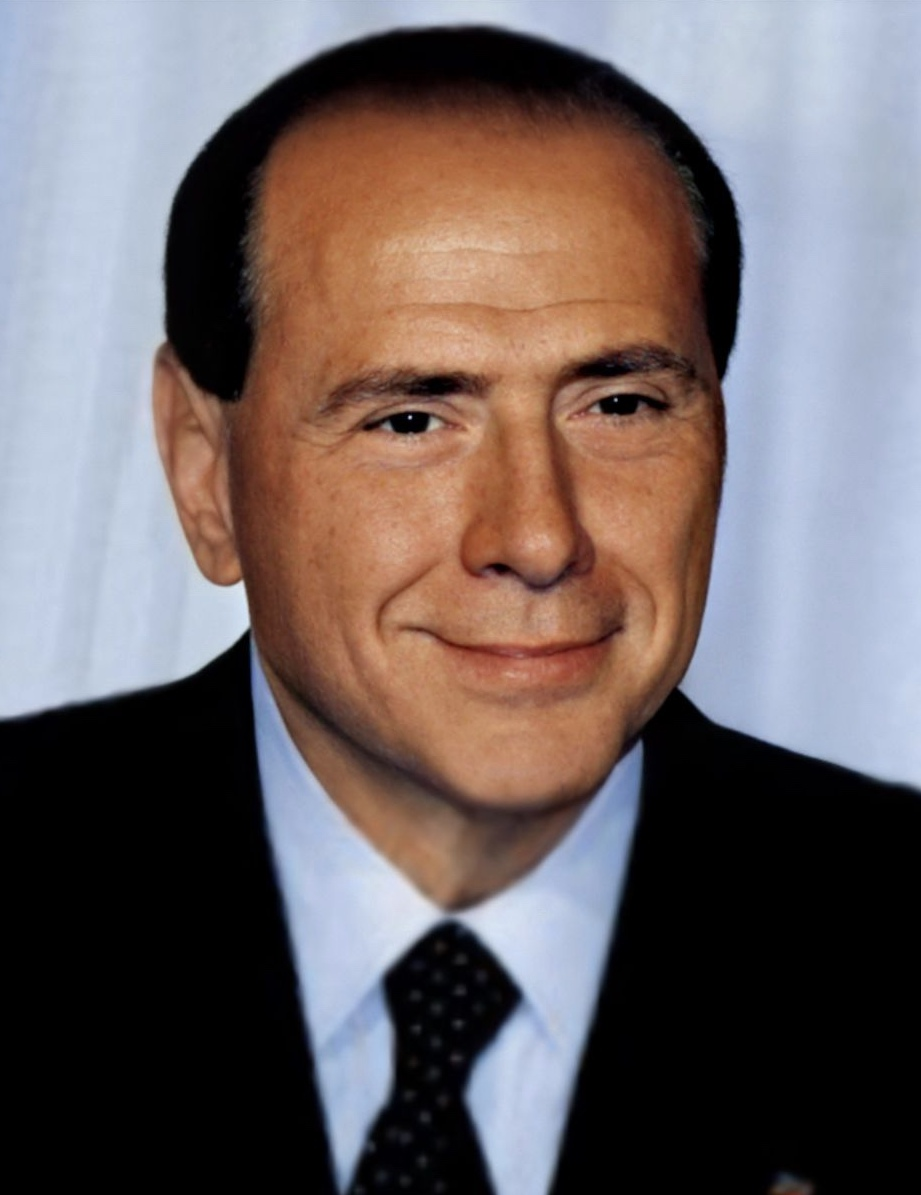

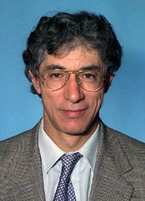

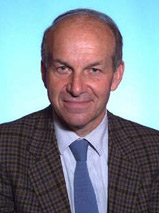
	First party	Second party
Leader	Romano Prodi	Silvio Berlusconi
Party	Independent	Forza Italia
Alliance	The Olive Tree	Pole for Freedoms
Leader since	6 March 1995	26 January 1994
Leader's seat	Bologna Mazzini (C)	Milano Centrale (C)
Seats won	285 (C) / 157 (S)	246 (C) / 116 (S)
Seat change	▲20 (C) / ▲4 (S)	▼26 (C) / ▼40 (S)
Constituency vote	15,747,455 (C); 13,444,978 (S)	15,027,030 (C); 12,185,020 (S)
% and swing	42.0% (C); 42.2% (S)	40.1% (C); 37.4% (S)
Party vote	13,014,235 (C)	15,772,203 (C)
% and swing	34.7% (C)	42.1% (C)
	Third party	Fourth party
Leader	Umberto Bossi	Fausto Bertinotti
Party	Northern League	PRC (Note: The PRC signed an agreement to desist with The Olive Tree in the single-member constituencies. In the colleges of Aosta and Mirabella Eclano, it ran as the Progressives, competing with the candidates of Democracy and Freedom.)
Alliance	—	—
Leader since	4 December 1989	22 January 1994
Leader's seat	Lombardy (C) (Note: Bossi ran also in the single-member constituency of Milan but he lost to Berlusconi.)	Piedmont (C)
Seats won	59 (C) / 27 (S)	35 (C) / 10 (S)
Seat change	▼58 (C) / ▼33 (S)	▼3 (C) / ▼8 (S)
Constituency vote	4,038,239 (C); 3,394,733 (S)	982,505 (C); 934,974 (S)
% and swing	10.8% (C); 10.4% (S)	2.6% (C); 2.9% (S)
Party vote	3,776,354 (C)	3,213,748 (C)
% and swing	10.1% (C)	8.6% (C)
- Results of the single-member constituencies in the Chamber of Deputies (left) and Senate (right)
Prime Minister before election
Lamberto Dini
Independent
Prime Minister after the election
Romano Prodi
The Olive Tree

The 1996 Italian general election was held on 21 April 1996 to elect members of the Chamber of Deputies and the Senate of the Republic. Romano Prodi, leader of the centre-left The Olive Tree, won the election, narrowly defeating Silvio Berlusconi, who led the centre-right Pole for Freedoms.

For the election, the Northern League of Umberto Bossi ran alone after having left the Berlusconi I Cabinet in 1994, causing a crisis which drove President Oscar Luigi Scalfaro to appoint a technocratic cabinet led by Lamberto Dini, which in turn lost its parliamentary support in 1995, forcing Scalfaro to dissolve the Italian Parliament. The Communist Refoundation Party, led by Fausto Bertinotti, made a pre-electoral alliance with The Olive Tree, presenting its own candidates, supported by Prodi's coalition, mainly in some safe leftist constituencies, in exchange for supporting Olive Tree candidates in the other ones, and ensuring external support for a Prodi government.

== Electoral system ==
The election was regulated by the Mattarella law of 1993, also known as "Mattarellum".

The intricate electoral system, known as scorporo, provided 75% of the seats on the Chamber of Deputies (the Lower House) as elected by a first-past-the-post system, whereas the remaining 25% was assigned by proportional representation with a minimum threshold of 4%.

The method used for the Senate was even more complicated: 75% of seats by uninominal method, and 25% by a special proportional method that assigned the remaining seats to minority parties. Formally, these were examples of mixed-member majoritarian systems with partial compensation.

== General election ==
=== Background ===
In December 1994, following the communication of a new investigation from Milan magistrates that was leaked to the press, Umberto Bossi, leader of the Northern League, left the coalition, claiming that the electoral pact had not been respected; this forced Berlusconi to resign from office and shifted the majority's weight to the centre-left side. The Northern League also resented the fact that many of its MPs had switched to Forza Italia, allegedly lured by promises of more prestigious portfolios.

Berlusconi remained as caretaker prime minister for a little over a month until his replacement by a technocratic government headed by Lamberto Dini. Dini had been a key minister in the Berlusconi cabinet, and Berlusconi said the only way he would support a technocratic government would be if Dini headed it. In the end, Dini was only supported by most opposition parties and not by Forza Italia and Northern League.

In December 1995, Dini resigned as Prime Minister and President Oscar Luigi Scalfaro decided to begin consultations to form a government, supported by all the parties in the Italian Parliament, to make constitutional reforms. In a TV debate on 19 January 1996, both Silvio Berlusconi and Democratic Party of the Left leader Massimo D'Alema supported constitutional reforms; however, there was much division on this theme in both coalitions, as Gianfranco Fini and Romano Prodi wanted a snap election, not sure that the reforms would be helpful for the country. On 16 February 1996, a snap election was called.

=== Campaign ===
On 19 February 1996, the outgoing Prime Minister Lamberto Dini announced that he would run in the election with a new party allied with The Olive Tree rather than Berlusconi's Pole of Freedoms. Shortly afterward, Berlusconi claimed that Dini "copied our electoral programme".

Another important declaration was that of Umberto Bossi, the leader of the regionalist Northern League, which had contributed greatly to Berlusconi's victory in the 1994 election. Bossi said that his party would no longer support Berlusconi and would run alone in the election. At the same time, Prodi's coalition made a pre-electoral agreement with the Communist Refoundation Party in which Fausto Bertinotti's party undertook to support Prodi's government after the election in the case that there was no parliamentary majority.

On 25 March 1996, Berlusconi organised a demonstration in Milan against taxes (The Tax Day) attended by many Milanese artisans; on the same day in Turin, Prodi was greatly heckled during his electoral speech and accused of not wanting to lower taxes.

== Main coalitions and parties ==
Coalition	Party	Main ideology	Party leader	Coalition leader
The Olive Tree	Democratic Party of the Left (PDS) (Note: Including the Movement of Unitarian Communists (MCU), the Social Christians (CS), the Labour Federation (FL) and Republican Left (SR).)	Democratic socialism	Massimo D'Alema	Romano Prodi
The Olive Tree	Populars for Prodi (Note: An electoral alliance composed of the Italian People's Party (PPI), Democratic Union (UD), the Italian Republican Party (PRI) and the South Tyrolean People's Party (SVP).)	Christian democracy	Gerardo Bianco	Romano Prodi
The Olive Tree	Italian Renewal (RI) (Note: Including the Italian Socialists (SI), Segni Pact (PS) and the Democratic Italian Movement (MID).)	Liberalism	Lamberto Dini	Romano Prodi
The Olive Tree	Federation of the Greens (FdV)	Green politics	Carlo Ripa di Meana	Romano Prodi
Pole for Freedoms	Forza Italia (FI)	Liberal conservatism	Silvio Berlusconi	Silvio Berlusconi
Pole for Freedoms	National Alliance (AN)	National conservatism	Gianfranco Fini	Silvio Berlusconi
Pole for Freedoms	Christian Democratic Centre (CCD)	Christian democracy	Pier Ferdinando Casini	Silvio Berlusconi
Pole for Freedoms	United Christian Democrats (CDU)	Christian democracy	Rocco Buttiglione	Silvio Berlusconi
Northern League (LN)		Regionalism	Umberto Bossi	
Communist Refoundation Party (PRC)		Communism	Fausto Bertinotti	
Pannella–Sgarbi List (LPS)		Libertarianism	Marco Pannella	
Tricolour Flame (FT)		Neo-fascism	Pino Rauti	

== Results ==
=== Chamber of Deputies ===
==== Overall results ====
← Summary of the 21 April 1996 Chamber of Deputies election results →
Coalition	Party	Proportional			First-past-the-post			Total seats	+/–
Coalition	Party	Votes	%	Seats	Votes	%	Seats	Total seats	+/–
The Olive Tree	Democratic Party of the Left (PDS)	7,894,118	21.06	26	15,747,455	42.01	146	172 (Note: Including eight deputies of the Movement of Unitarian Communists (MCU), six deputies of the Labour Federation (FL), five deputies of the Social Christians (CS), one deputy of the Republican Left (SR) and one deputy of the Italian Democratic Socialist Party (PSDI))	+48
The Olive Tree	Populars for Prodi (PPI–UD–PRI–SVP)	2,554,072	6.81	4	15,747,455	42.01	65	69 (Note: Including five deputies of the Democratic Union (UD) and two deputies of the Italian Republican Party (PRI))	+18
The Olive Tree	Italian Renewal (RI)	1,627,380	4.34	8	15,747,455	42.01	18	26 (Note: Including eight deputies of Segni Pact (Patto), seven deputies of the Italian Socialists (SI) and one deputy of the Democratic Italian Movement (MID))	New
The Olive Tree	Federation of the Greens (FdV)	938,665	2.50	0	15,747,455	42.01	14	14	+3
The Olive Tree	The Network (LR)	—N/a	—N/a	0	15,747,455	42.01	3	3	−5
The Olive Tree	Ladin Autonomist Union (UAL)	—N/a	—N/a	0	15,747,455	42.01	1	1	+1
The Olive Tree	Total seats			38			247	285	–
Pole for Freedoms	Forza Italia (FI)	7,712,149	20.57	37	15,027,030	40.08	86	123 (Note: Including 3 deputies of the Union of the Centre (UdC))	−9
Pole for Freedoms	National Alliance (AN)	5,870,491	15.66	28	15,027,030	40.08	65	93	−17
Pole for Freedoms	CCD – CDU	2,189,563	5.84	12	15,027,030	40.08	28	30 (Note: Including 19 deputies of CCD and 11 deputies of CDU)	+3
Pole for Freedoms	Total seats			77			169	246	–
Northern League (LN)		3,776,354	10.07	20	4,038,239	10.77	39	59	−59
Communist Refoundation Party (PRC)		3,213,748	8.57	20	982,505	2.62	15	35	−3
South Tyrolean People's Party (SVP)		—N/a	—N/a	0	156,708	0.42	3	3	±0
Southern Action League (LAM)		72,062	0.19	0	82,373	0.22	1	1	±0
Aosta Valley (VdA)		—N/a	—N/a	0	37,431	0.10	1	1	±0
Others		1,635,796	4.39	0	1,223,368	3.78	0	0	±0
Total		37,484,398	100.00	155	37,295,109	100.00	475	630	—N/a

==== Proportional and FPTP results ====
First-past-the-post
Parties and coalitions	Vote	%	Seats
Pole for Freedoms (PpL)	15,027,030	40.09	169
The Olive Tree (Ulivo)	14,447,548	38.54	228
Northern League (LN)	4,038,239	10.77	39
The Olive Tree – Venetian Autonomy League (Ulivo–LAV)	997,534	2.66	14
Progressives	982,505	2.62	15
Tricolour Flame (FT)	624,558	1.67	0
The Olive Tree – Sardinian Action Party (Ulivo–PSd'Az)	269,047	0.72	4
South Tyrolean People's Party (SVP)	156,708	0.42	3
Southern Action League (LAM)	82,373	0.22	1
Pannella-Sgarbi List (LPS)	69,406	0.19	0
Clean Hands (MP)	68,443	0.18	0
Socialist Party (PS)	44,786	0.12	0
Sardigna Natzione (SN)	42,246	0.11	0
Aosta Valley (VdA)	37,431	0.10	1
Democracy and Freedom (DL)	33,326	0.09	1
Renovation	28,988	0.08	0
Humanist Party (PU)	27,694	0.07	0
Italian Renaissance Movement (MRI)	24,074	0.06	0
Union for South Tyrol (UfS)	23,032	0.06	0
We Sicilians – Sicilian National Front (NS–FNS)	20,102	0.05	0
Pact for the Agro	18,836	0.05	0
Communist Refoundation Party (PRC)	17,996	0.05	0
Greens Greens	12,905	0.03	0
Environmentalists	12,299	0.03	0
Liberal Federalists (FL)	11,563	0.03	0
Aosta Valley for the Olive Tree	11,526	0.03	0
Social Democracy (DS)	9,760	0.03	0
North-East Union (UNE)	9,669	0.03	0
Independent Group Freedom (GIL)	8,805	0.02	0
Natural Law Party (PLN)	7,708	0.02	0
Moderates	6,208	0.02	0
New Energies	5,627	0.02	0
New Democracy (ND)	5,333	0.01	0
Development and Legality	5,275	0.01	0
For Marche	4,317	0.01	0
Resurgence of the South	4,291	0.01	0
Free North Autonomy	4,013	0.01	0
New Ways	3,904	0.01	0
State of Friuli	3,345	0.01	0
Liberist Solidary Alliance	3,219	0.01	0
Ingenuity and Audacity	2,805	0.01	0
Venetian Solidarity	2,655	0.01	0
South Pole Movement	2,310	0.01	0
Federalist Italian League (LIF)	2,268	0.01	0
Trieste Women's Pact	2,121	0.01	0
Others	71,281	0.19	0
Total	37,295,109	100.00	475
Source: Ministry of the Interior

Proportional
Party	Votes	%	Seats
Democratic Party of the Left (PDS)	7,894,118	21.06	26
Forza Italia (FI)	7,712,149	20.57	37
National Alliance (AN)	5,870,491	15.66	28
Northern League (LN)	3,776,354	10.07	20
Communist Refoundation Party (PRC)	3,213,748	8.57	20
Populars for Prodi (PPI–UD–PRI–SVP)	2,554,072	6.81	4
Christian Democratic Centre – United Christian Democrats (CCD–CDU)	2,189,563	5.84	12
Italian Renewal (RI)	1,627,380	4.34	8
Federation of the Greens (FdV)	938,665	2.50	0
Pannella-Sgarbi List (LPS)	702,988	1.88	0
Tricolour Flame (FT)	339,351	0.91	0
Socialist Party (PS)	149,441	0.40	0
Southern Action League (LAM)	72,062	0.19	0
North-East Union (UNE)	63,934	0.17	0
Union for South Tyrol (UfS)	55,548	0.15	0
Clean Hands (MP)	44,935	0.12	0
We Sicilians – Sicilian National Front (NS–FNS)	41,001	0.11	0
Sardinian Action Party (PSd'Az)	38,002	0.10	0
Greens Greens	25,788	0.07	0
Sardigna Natzione (SN)	23,355	0.06	0
Independent Group Freedom	17,451	0.05	0
Environmentalists	15,560	0.04	0
Humanist Party (PU)	14,601	0.04	0
Renovation	13,677	0.04	0
Pact for the Agro	12,297	0.03	0
Social Democracy	9,319	0.02	0
Italian Renaissance Movement (MRI)	8,886	0.02	0
Tuscan Autonomist Movement (MAT)	8,627	0.02	0
Natural Law Party (PLN)	8,298	0.02	0
New Democracy	8,185	0.02	0
Liberal Federalists (FL)	6,475	0.02	0
For Marche	5,545	0.01	0
New Energies	5,393	0.01	0
Development and Legality	5,347	0.01	0
Free North Autonomy	4,965	0.01	0
Federalist Party (PF)	3,743	0.01	0
Resurgence of the South	3,084	0.01	0
Total	100.00	37,484,398	155
Invalid/blank/unassigned votes	–	2,917,376	–
Total	–	40,401,774	–
Registered voters/turnout	82.88%	48,744,846	–
Source: Ministry of the Interior

Popular vote (Proportional)
PDS	21.06%
FI	20.57%
AN	15.66%
LN	10.07%
PRC	8.57%
Popolari	6.81%
CCD-CDU	5.84%
RI	4.34%
FdV	2.50%
LPS	1.88%
Others	2.68%

Popular vote (First-past-the-post)
Ulivo	41.92%
PpL	40.09%
LN	10.77%
PRC	2.62%
FT	1.67%
Others	3.65%

=== Senate of the Republic ===
← Summary of the 21 April 1996 Senate of the Republic election results →
Coalition	Party	First-past-the-post			Proportional Seats	Total seats	+/–
Coalition	Party	Votes	%	Seats	Proportional Seats	Total seats	+/–
The Olive Tree	Democratic Party of the Left (PDS)	13,444,978	41.21	134	23	102 (Note: Including five senators of the Labour Federation (FL) and four senators of the Social Christians (CS))	+26
The Olive Tree	Italian People's Party (PPI)	13,444,978	41.21	134	23	27	−4
The Olive Tree	Federation of the Greens (FdV)	13,444,978	41.21	134	23	14	+7
The Olive Tree	Italian Renewal (RI)	13,444,978	41.21	134	23	11 (Note: Including five senators of the Italian Socialists (SI), one senator of Segni Pact (PS) and one senator of the Democratic Italian Movement (MID))	New
The Olive Tree	The Network (LR)	13,444,978	41.21	134	23	1	−5
The Olive Tree	Venetian Autonomy League (LAV)	13,444,978	41.21	134	23	1	+1
The Olive Tree	Sardinian Action Party (PSd'Az)	13,444,978	41.21	134	23	1	+1
The Olive Tree	Total seats					157	–
Pole for Freedoms	Forza Italia (FI)	12,185,020	37.35	67	49	48 (Note: Including two senators of the Union of the Centre (UdC))	+13
Pole for Freedoms	National Alliance (AN)	12,185,020	37.35	67	49	43	−4
Pole for Freedoms	Christian Democratic Centre (CCD)	12,185,020	37.35	67	49	15	+3
Pole for Freedoms	United Christian Democrats (CDU)	12,185,020	37.35	67	49	10	New
Pole for Freedoms	Total seats					116	–
Northern League (LN)		3,394,733	10.41	18	9	27	−33
Progressives		934,974	2.87	10	0	10	−8
Tricolour Flame (FT)		747,487	2.29	0	1	1	New
Pannella-Sgarbi List (LPS)		509,826	1.56	0	1	1	±0
Socialist Party (PS)		286,426	0.88	0	0	0	New
The Fir – South Tyrolean People's Party – PATT		178,425	0.55	2	0	2	−1
Clean Hands		109,113	0.33	0	0	0	New
League for Autonomy – Lombard Alliance		106,313	0.33	0	0	0	New
North-East Union (UNE)		72,541	0.22	0	0	0	New
We Sicilians – Sicilian National Front (NS–FNS)		71,841	0.22	0	0	0	New
Southern Action League (LAM)		66,750	0.20	0	0	0	±0
Greens Greens		61,434	0.19	0	0	0	±0
Pensioners' Party (PP)		60,640	0.19	0	0	0	±0
Social Democracy		60,016	0.18	0	0	0	New
Federation of Italian Civic Lists		55,793	0.17	0	0	0	New
Sardigna Natzione (SN)		44,713	0.14	0	0	0	New
Aosta Valley (VdA)		27,493	0.08	1	0	1	±0
Piedmont Nation of Europe		26,951	0.08	0	0	0	±0
Environmentalists		26,756	0.08	0	0	0	New
Independent Group Freedom (GIL)		23,301	0.07	0	0	0	New
Union for South Tyrol (UfS)		19,330	0.06	0	0	0	New
Tuscan Autonomist Movement (MAT)		18,691	0.06	0	0	0	±0
Pact for the Agro		17,980	0.06	0	0	0	New
Renovation		16,216	0.05	0	0	0	New
Right of the People		6,710	0.02	0	0	0	New
Natural Law Party (PLN)		10,371	0.03	0	0	0	New
Democrats for Progress		5,688	0.02	0	0	0	New
Communist Refoundation Party (PRC)		5,681	0.02	0	0	0	—N/a
Popular Movement of Moralization (MPM)		5,297	0.02	0	0	0	New
Azure Alps		5,144	0.02	0	0	0	New
Democratic Alternative for the Roman Castles		4,524	0.01	0	0	0	New
Progressive People's Party (PPP)		4,450	0.01	0	0	0	±0
For a Normal Country		3,976	0.01	0	0	0	New
European Dolomite Region		2,898	0.01	0	0	0	New
Free North Autonomy		2,411	0.01	0	0	0	New
Hit the Center		2,178	0.01	0	0	0	New
Total		32,624,584	100.00	232	83	315	—N/a
Source: Ministry of the Interior

Popular vote
Ulivo	41.21%
PpL	37.35%
LN	10.41%
Prog.	2.87%
FT	2.29%
LPS	1.56%
Others	5.63%

=== Leaders' races ===
1996 Italian general election (C): Bologna – Mazzini
Candidate	Coalition	Party	Votes	%
Romano Prodi	The Olive Tree	Ind	55,830	60.82
Filippo Berselli	Pole	AN	35,972	39.18
Total			91,802	100.0
Turnout			95,948	92.26
The Olive Tree hold				
Source: Ministry of the Interior

1996 Italian general election (C): Milan 1
Candidate	Coalition	Party	Votes	%
Silvio Berlusconi	Pole	FI	46,098	51.50
Michele Salvati	The Olive Tree	PDS	32,464	36.27
Umberto Bossi	None	LN	10,179	11.37
Others			766	0.86
Total			89,507	100.0
Turnout			92,969	82.64
Pole hold				
Source: Ministry of the Interior

== See also ==
- Politics of Italy
- History of the Italian Republic#Second Republic (1992–present)
