= Roberto Villetti =

Italian politician (1944–2019)

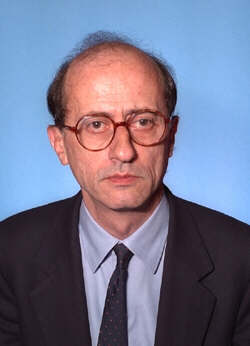
Roberto Villetti

Roberto Villetti (24 August 1944 – 14 September 2019) was an Italian politician.

A long-time member of the Italian Socialist Party (PSI), he was vice-secretary of the Italian Socialists (SI) from 1994 to 1998. Since 1998 he is vice-secretary of the Italian Democratic Socialists (SDI).

He was deputy from 1996 to 2008; from 2006 to 2008 he was leader of the Rose in the Fist group in the Italian Chamber of Deputies.
