= We Sicilians =

We Sicilians Noi Siciliani
- President: Teresa Canepa
- Coordinator: Filippo Morana
- Founded: 1994
- Ideology: Regionalism; Autonomism
- Sicilian Regional Assembly: 0 / 70

We Sicilians (Italian: Noi Siciliani) is a political party active in Sicily.

== History ==
The Federation for the Self-Determination of Sicily "We Sicilians" (Federazione per l'Autodeterminazione della Sicilia "Noi Siciliani") was founded by Erasmo Vecchio in December 1994.

In 1996 it formed an alliance with the Sicilian National Front led by Giuseppe Scianò.

The party contested the 1996 Sicilian regional elections and managed to win a seat with 1.7% of the vote.

In the 2001 Sicilian regional election it was part was part of the centre-left coalition that supported the candidacy of Leoluca Orlando but fell to 0.1% of the votes and lost the only seat it held in the Sicilian Regional Assembly.

== Electoral results ==
=== Italian Parliament ===
Chamber of Deputies
Election year		votes	%	seats
1996	Proportional	41,001	0.11	0 / 155
1996	FPTP	20.102	0.05	0 / 475
2001	Proportional	7,637	0.02	0 / 155
2001	FPTP	6,121	0.02	0 / 475
2006		5,003	0.01	0 / 630

Senate of the Republic
Election year	votes	%	seats
1996	71,841	0.22	0 / 315
2001	6,121	0.02	0 / 315
2006	6,556	0.02	0 / 315

=== Sicilian Regional Assembly ===
Election year	votes	%	seats
1996	46,606	1.7	1 / 90
2001	2,382	0.1	0 / 80
