= Greens Greens =

Greens Greens Verdi Verdi
- Leader: Maurizio Lupi
- Coordinator: Fabio Sanfilippo
- Founded: 14 January 1991
- Split from: Federation of Green Lists
- Headquarters: Via Pio VII 78, 10135 Turin
- Ideology: Green conservatism Green liberalism
- Political position: Centre-right

Website
- www.verdiverdi.it

The Greens Greens (Verdi Verdi) is a liberal-environmentalist political party in Italy. The party is predominantly active in Piedmont.

The party was founded in January 1991 by Maurizio Lupi, a physical education teacher and former member of Christian Democracy and of Federation of the Greens.

The party took part in Italian elections for the first time at the 1992 general election. The party got 0.07% of the vote in the Chamber of Deputies and 0.09% in the Senate. In 1997, Lupi ran as mayor of Turin, receiving 0.74% of the votes, while his party got 0.81% of the votes. In 1999, the party ran in Turin provincial election, getting 0.38% of the votes.

In 2003, the party's local representative Roberto De Santis received 0.5% of the votes in Rome provincial election. In 2004, the party took part in the European Parliament elections with a joint list (called "Abolizione Scorporo"), together with the Federalist Greens. The list got only 0.49% of the votes.

At the 2004 Turin provincial election, the Greens Greens supported the centre-right candidate Franco Botta; the founder Maurizio Lupi chose to run instead with an unrelated, independent list.

In the 2005 Piedmontese regional elections, the Greens Greens supported the centre-right candidate Enzo Ghigo; the list got 1.16% of the votes, winning one seat for its leader Maurizio Lupi. In the 2006 general elections, the party ran as part of the House of Freedoms coalition, getting only 0.04% of the votes in the Chamber of Deputies election and 0.11% of votes in the Senate election. In the 2008 general elections, Alessandro Lupi ran for the Chamber as part of The People of Freedom list, but wasn't elected. In the 2009 Turin provincial election, the party supported the candidate Renzo Rabellino, leader of the No Euro Movement; the list got only 0.39% of the votes. In the 2010 Piedmontese regional elections, the Greens Greens supported centre-right candidate Roberto Cota, getting 1.76% of the votes and one seat and outperforming for the first time the Federation of the Greens, which received only 0.76% of the votes. In the 2014 Piedmontese regional elections, the party supported the candidate of Forza Italia Gilberto Pichetto Fratin, but got only 0.27% of the votes.

In 2016, Maurizio Lupi and his daughter Sara were sentenced for expenditures fraud.
