= Tuscan Autonomist Movement =

Tuscan Autonomist Movement Movimento Autonomista Toscano
- Leader: Alessandro Mazzerelli
- Founded: 28 April 1989
- Ideology: Autonomism
- Political position: Right-wing
- Regional Council of Tuscany: 0 / 41

Website
- https://www.mat-toscanalibera.org/

The Tuscan Autonomist Movement (Italian: Movimento Autonomista Toscano, abbr. MAT) is a political party active in Tuscany, led by Alessandro Mazzerelli.

== History ==
The party was founded in 1989 by Alessandro Mazzerelli. The party pursues the autonomy of the Tuscany region; furthermore, it has always been characterized by his opposition to immigration from southern Italy and to clandestine immigration.

The MAT achieved its most important electoral result in the municipal elections of Grosseto in 1997, when, within the winning centre-right coalition in support of the candidacy for mayor of Alessandro Antichi, it obtained 7.1% of the vote and three seats.

In the 2001 Italian general election, Mazzarelli was a candidate to the Senate for the House of Freedoms, but he got the 30% of the vote and was defeated by Giovanni Brunale, candidate for The Olive Tree.

In 2007, the MAT and the Movement for Autonomy, headed by MEP Raffaele Lombardo, signed a political and electoral agreement to promote common initiatives aimed at strengthening the project of a federal State.

In 2012, the MAT entered into the "Sovereign Peoples" coalition, together with six other autonomist parties (New Sicily, Lega Sud Ausonia, Liga Veneta Repubblica, Venetians of Europe, Sardinian Action Party and Solidary and United Christians). On 7 December 2021, the MAT adhered to the 1st International Forum of the federalist, autonomist and independence movements of Europe, which took place at the Cultural Center of Wil, in Zürich.
