= Populars for Prodi =

Populars for Prodi Popolari per Prodi
- Founded: 1996
- Dissolved: 1996
- Preceded by: Pact for Italy
- Merged into: Democracy is Freedom – The Daisy
- Political position: Centre to centre-left
- National affiliation: The Olive Tree (1996)

The Populars for Prodi (Italian: Popolari per Prodi) was an electoral list of political parties in Italy.

The list participated in the 1996 general election as a component of The Olive Tree, supporting Romano Prodi as candidate for Prime Minister. The list, contested seats for the Chamber of Deputies, receiving 6.8% of the vote and 72 deputies (including Prodi).

== Composition ==
The alliance was composed of the following four parties:

Party	Ideology	Leader
Italian People's Party (PPI)	Christian democracy	Gerardo Bianco
Democratic Union (UD)	Social liberalism	Antonio Maccanico
Italian Republican Party (PRI)	Liberalism	Giorgio La Malfa
South Tyrolean People's Party (SVP)	Regionalism	Siegfried Brugger

== Electoral results ==
=== Italian Parliament ===
Chamber of Deputies
Election year	# of overall votes	% of overall vote	# of overall seats won	+/–	Leader
1996	2,554,072 (#6)	6.8	69 / 630	–	Franco Marini
