= House of Freedoms =

House of Freedoms Casa delle Libertà
- Leader: Silvio Berlusconi
- Other leaders: Gianfranco Fini; Pier Ferdinando Casini; Umberto Bossi
- Founded: 2000
- Dissolved: 2008
- Preceded by: Pole for Freedoms
- Merged into: The People of Freedom (FI, AN, minor parties)
- Succeeded by: Centre-right coalition
- Political position: Centre-right

The House of Freedoms (Italian: Casa delle Libertà, CdL) was a major centre-right political and electoral alliance in Italy, led by Silvio Berlusconi.

== History ==
The CdL was the successor of the Pole of Freedoms/Pole of Good Government and the Pole for Freedoms. The former two-headed coalition had won the 1994 general election and formed the Berlusconi I Cabinet, which fell in December 1994, when the LN, whose relations with AN were quite tense, withdrew its support. The latter coalition, which did not include the LN, lost the 1996 general election to The Olive Tree, the centre-left coalition led by Romano Prodi.

In the run-up of the 2001 general election, after a six-year spell in opposition, which Berlusconi called "the crossing of the desert", he managed to re-unite the coalition under the "House of Freedoms" banner. According to its leader, the alliance was a "broad democratic arch, composed of the democratic right, namely AN, the great democratic centre, namely Forza Italia, CCD and CDU, and the democratic left represented by the League, the New PSI, the PRI and, at least I hope so, Cossiga".

The CdL won the 2001 general election by a landslide and, consequently, the Berlusconi II Cabinet was formed. In government, FI, whose strongholds included Lombardy as well as Sicily, and the LN, which was active only in the Centre-North, formed the so-called "axis of the North", through the special relationship between three Lombards leaders, Berlusconi, Giulio Tremonti and Umberto Bossi; on the other side of the coalition, AN and the Union of Christian and Centre Democrats (UDC), the party emerged from the merger of the CCD and the CDU in late 2002, became the natural representatives of Southern interests.

In 2003 the CdL was routed in local elections by The Olive Tree and the LN threatened to pull out. Also the 2004 European Parliament election were disappointing for FI and the coalition as a whole, even though AN, the UDC and the LN did better than five years before. As a result, Berlusconi and FI were weaker within the CdL.

In 2005 the coalition lost heavily in regional elections, losing six of the eight regions it controlled. The defeat was particularly damaging in the South, while the only two regions which the coalition managed to keep, Lombardy and Veneto, were in the North, where the LN was decisive. This led to a government crisis, particularly after the UDC pulled its ministers out. A few days later, the Berlusconi III Cabinet was formed with minor changes from the previous cabinet.

In the 2006 general election the CdL, which had opened its ranks to a number of minor parties, lost to The Union coalition, led by Romano Prodi.

In the run-up of the 2008 general election (caused by the break-up of The Olive Tree) FI, AN and minor parties joined forces and formed The People of Freedom (PdL), which would become a single party in early 2009. The PdL, allied with the LN in the Centre-North and the Movement for Autonomy (MpA) in the Centre-South, won the election and the centre-right was thus returned to the national government through the Berlusconi IV Cabinet.

The alliance has since been generically referred to as the centre-right coalition.

== Composition ==
=== From 2000 to 2006 ===
It was initially composed of the following political parties:

Party	Ideology	Leader
Forza Italia (FI)	Liberal conservatism	Silvio Berlusconi
National Alliance (AN)	Conservatism	Gianfranco Fini
Northern League (LN)	Regionalism	Umberto Bossi
Christian Democratic Centre (CCD)	Christian democracy	Pier Ferdinando Casini
United Christian Democrats (CDU)	Christian democracy	Rocco Buttiglione
New Italian Socialist Party (NPSI)	Social democracy	Gianni De Michelis
Italian Republican Party (PRI)	Liberalism	Giorgio La Malfa

=== From 2006 to 2008 ===
Composition during the 2006 general election:

Party	Ideology	Leader
Forza Italia (FI)	Liberal conservatism	Silvio Berlusconi
National Alliance (AN)	Conservatism	Gianfranco Fini
Northern League (LN)	Regionalism	Umberto Bossi
Union of Christian and Centre Democrats (UDC)	Christian democracy	Pier Ferdinando Casini
Christian Democracy for Autonomies (DCA)	Christian democracy	Gianfranco Rotondi
New Italian Socialist Party (NPSI)	Social democracy	Gianni De Michelis
Movement for Autonomy (MpA)	Regionalism	Raffaele Lombardo
Liberal Reformers (RL)	Liberalism	Benedetto Della Vedova

== Electoral results ==
=== Italian Parliament ===
Chamber of Deputies
Election year	Votes	%	Seats	+/−	Leader
2001	16,915,513 (1st)	45.4	368 / 630	–	Silvio Berlusconi
2006	18,995,697 (2nd)	49.7	281 / 630	▼87	Silvio Berlusconi

Senate of the Republic
Election year	Votes	%	Seats	+/−	Leader
2001	14,406,519 (1st)	42.5	176 / 315	–	Silvio Berlusconi
2006	17,359,754 (1st)	49.8	156 / 315	▼20	Silvio Berlusconi

== Symbols ==
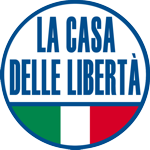
2001–2008

Electoral logo
