= Humanist Party (Italy) =

Italian political party

Humanist Party Partito Umanista
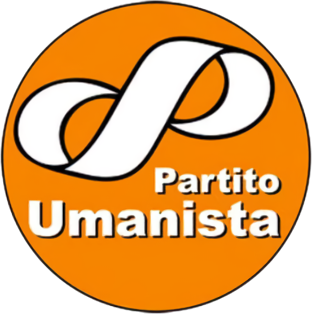
- Secretary-General: Giovanna Ubaldeschi
- Founded: 1984
- Headquarters: via La Nebbia, 9 - 00168 Rome
- Ideology: Universal humanism
- European affiliation: Humanist International

Website
- www.partitoumanista.it

The Humanist Party (Italian: Partito Umanista, PU) is a minor political party in Italy. Founded in 1984, the party is a member of the Humanist International. It has never been represented in either the Italian Chamber of Deputies or the Italian Senate, the two houses of the Parliament of Italy.

Its long-time leader was Giorgio Schultze (secretary since 1996 to 2003), who is currently spokesman of the Humanist Movement in Europe. In 2005, Marina Larena was elected new secretary of the party.

The party did not take part to the 2008 general election, but some Humanist activists ran as independents in the lists of The Left – The Rainbow and For the Common Good, both left-wing coalitions. In the 2009 European Parliament election, Schultze ran as a candidate for Italy of Values (IdV). This choice was criticized by those who acknowledged the IdV's law and order policies over immigration.

In 2010, after a period of organizational difficulties, Tony Manigrasso was elected secretary of the party and he was reconfirmed also in 2012. In 2014, he was replaced by Valerio Colombo. Subsequently, Giovanna Ubaldeschi was appointed secretary of the party.
