= Italian Renewal =

Defunct liberal political party in Italy

Italian Renewal Rinnovamento Italiano
- Leader: Lamberto Dini
- Founded: 27 February 1996
- Dissolved: 17 March 2002
- Merged into: Democracy is Freedom – The Daisy
- Headquarters: Via di Ripetta, 142 - 00186 Rome
- Ideology: Liberalism; Pro-Europeanism
- Political position: Centre
- National affiliation: The Olive Tree
- European affiliation: European People's Party
- European Parliament group: EPP-ED

Italian Renewal (Italian: Rinnovamento Italiano, RI) was a centrist and liberal political party in Italy.

The party was a member of The Olive Tree and centre-left coalition, while also affiliated to the European People's Party from 1998 to 2004.

== History ==
Originally the Dini List – Italian Renewal (Lista Dini – Rinnovamento Italiano), the party was founded in 1996 by Lamberto Dini, the outgoing Prime Minister, along with former Christian Democrats, Liberals, Socialists, Republicans and Social Democrats. The party joined The Olive Tree centre-left coalition led by Romano Prodi. In the 1996 Italian general election, RI gave hospitality in its electoral lists to the Italian Socialists (SI), the Segni Pact (PS) and the Democratic Italian Movement (MID). The Dini List won 4.3% of the vote, winning 26 seats at the Chamber:

- 10 Diniani (Dini, Augusto Fantozzi, Tiziano Treu, Natale D'Amico, Ernesto Stajano, Gianni Marongiu, Pierluigi Petrini, Andrea Guarino, Paolo Ricciotti, Lucio Testa);
- 8 PS (Diego Masi, Giuseppe Bicocchi, Elisa Pozza Tasca, Gianni Rivera, Antonino Mangiacavallo, Gianantonio Mazzocchin, Bonaventura Lamacchia, Paolo Manca);
- 7 SI (Enrico Boselli, Giuseppe Albertini, Enzo Ceremigna, Giovanni Crema, Leone Delfino, Sergio Fumagalli, Roberto Villetti);
- 1 MID (Aldo Brancati).

The list also won 11 seats at the Senate:

- 5 SI (Ottaviano Del Turco, Livio Besso Cordero, Giovanni Iuliano, Maria Rosaria Manieri, Cesare Marini);
- 4 Diniani (Mario D'Urso, Bianca Maria Fiorillo, Angelo Giorgianni, Adriano Ossicini);
- 1 PS (Carla Mazzuca Poggiolini);
- 1 MID (Giovanni Bruni).

After the election Dini became Minister of Foreign Affairs and Treu minister of Labour in the Prodi I Cabinet.

In 1998 the party was admitted into the European People's Party and at the 1999 obtained 1.1% of the vote and one MEP, Pino Pisicchio.

In October 2001 the party joined the Democracy is Freedom – The Daisy (DL), an electoral alliance of centrist parties which merged to become a unified party in March 2002. RI members in DL formed a faction within the party, named simply Renewal, consisting of around 10% of the party members. In 2007 several members of this association including Dini broke away from to form the Liberal Democrats upon DL's merger with the Democrats of the Left to form the Democratic Party.

== Electoral results ==
=== Italian Parliament ===
Chamber of Deputies
Election year	Votes	%	Seats	+/−	Leader
1996	1,627,380 (8th)	4.3	36 / 630	–	Lamberto Dini

Senate of the Republic
Election year	Votes	%	Seats	+/−	Leader
1996	with Ulivo	–	11 / 315	–	Lamberto Dini

=== European Parliament ===
European Parliament
Election year	Votes	%	Seats	+/−	Leader
1999	353,890 (16th)	1.1	1 / 87	–	Lamberto Dini

== Symbols ==
1996–1999

1999–2001

2001–2002
