= Livio Besso Cordero =

Italian politician (1948–2018)

Livio Besso Cordero (5 February 1948 – 27 April 2018) was an Italian politician who was a Senator from 1996 to 2001.
