= Democratic Union (Italy) =

Democratic Union Unione Democratica
- President: Antonio Maccanico
- Founded: 26 February 1996
- Dissolved: 27 February 1999
- Preceded by: Democratic Alliance
- Merged into: The Democrats
- Ideology: Social liberalism
- Political position: Centre-left
- National affiliation: The Olive Tree (1996–99); Populars for Prodi (1996)

The Democratic Union (Italian: Unione Democratica, UD) was a small social-liberal political party in Italy.

== History ==
It was founded in February 1996 by Antonio Maccanico, along with Willer Bordon and Giorgio Benvenuto (both members of Democratic Alliance), Valerio Zanone (a former leader of the Italian Liberal Party) and Giorgio La Malfa (leader of the Italian Republican Party). The party was a minor member of The Olive Tree, and formed the Populars for Prodi list with the Italian People's Party for the 1996 general election, electing five deputies and one senator.

The party was part of the Prodi I Cabinet, with Maccanico becoming minister for Communications, and later the D'Alema I Cabinet, D'Alema II Cabinet and Amato II Cabinet with Maccanico minister of Institutional Reforms.

In 1999 the party joined Romano Prodi's new party, The Democrats.
