= Pole of Freedoms =

Pole of Freedoms Polo delle Libertà
- Leader: Silvio Berlusconi; Umberto Bossi
- Founded: 1994
- Dissolved: 1995
- Succeeded by: Pole for Freedoms
- Political position: Centre-right
- National affiliation: with Pole of Good Government; Centre-right coalition

The Pole of Freedoms (Italian: Polo delle Libertà) was a centre-right political and electoral alliance in Italy, launched at the 1994 general election by Silvio Berlusconi. Its counterpart in central and southern Italy was the Pole of Good Government, both forming the first incarnation of the centre-right coalition.

Differently from the other coalitions in the Italian history, it was simply a political, and not an administrative alliance, so contributing to its failure.

== History ==
The alliance was composed primarily of Forza Italia and the Lega Nord, while also including the Christian Democratic Centre and Union of the Centre, the latter represented in Forza Italia's electoral lists. The Pole of Freedoms was present only in Northern Italy, while the Pole of Good Government, composed of Forza Italia and the National Alliance, was present in most of Southern Italy. The National Alliance ran individually in the North as a rightist coalition in opposition to the Pole. The Pannella List also ran against the Pole, since the League saw the List as contrary to its liberal and federalist ideas.

However, the term "Pole of Freedoms" (as that of "Pole of Good Government") had no official character: the logo that identified the coalition included just the symbols of the lists that were part of the alliance (furthermore, this symbol was only present for the election of the Senate).

Even if this alliance, differently from the Pole of Good Government, had the explicit goal to run for the Government of Italy, it was not extended to the local level, where the parties composing it ran individually.

The Pole had good results between the young people, with three percentage points of difference between the House and the age-restricted Senate.

After the fall of the Berlusconi I Cabinet because of disagreements with the Lega Nord, the alliance ended. Afterwards Forza Italia, the National Alliance and Christian Democratic Centre formed another coalition, the Pole for Freedoms, which in 2000, after the re-entry of Lega Nord, was renamed the House of Freedoms.

== Composition ==
The Pole was composed of the following political parties:

Party	Ideology	Leader
Forza Italia (FI)	Liberal conservatism	Silvio Berlusconi
Lega Nord (LN)	Regionalism	Umberto Bossi
Christian Democratic Centre (CCD)	Christian democracy	Pier Ferdinando Casini
Union of the Centre (UdC)	Liberalism	Raffaele Costa

== Election results ==
Election	Leader	Chamber of Deputies				Senate of the Republic			
Election	Leader	Votes	%	Seats	Position	Votes	%	Seats	Position
1994	Silvio Berlusconi	8,767,720	22.8	2nd	164 / 475	6,570,468	19.9	82 / 315	2nd
