= Pole for Freedoms =

Pole for Freedoms Polo per le Libertà
- Leader: Silvio Berlusconi
- Other leaders: Gianfranco Fini; Pier Ferdinando Casini
- Founded: 1995 (de facto); 1996 (de jure)
- Dissolved: 2000
- Preceded by: Pole of Freedoms; Pole of Good Government
- Succeeded by: House of Freedoms
- Political position: Centre-right

The Pole for Freedoms (Italian: Polo per le Libertà) was a centre-right political and electoral alliance in Italy, which was active from 1996 to 2000. It included Forza Italia (FI), the National Alliance (AN), Union of the Centre (UdC), Christian Democratic Centre (CCD), United Christian Democrats (CDD), and Pannella–Sgarbi List.

== History ==
The Pole for Freedoms was formed as a continuation of the Pole of Freedoms and Pole of Good Government coalitions, which had both supported the leadership of Silvio Berlusconi at the 1994 general election: the Pole of Freedom was constituted by Forza Italy and Lega Nord, the Pole of Good Government by Forza Italia and the National Alliance. After that, Lega Nord left the coalition at the end of 1994, the centre-right was forced to reform itself: in 1995, in occasion of the regional elections, an organic alliance was formed. In 1996 it was officially named "Pole for Freedoms" and debuted in the 1996 general election; however, it was defeated by the centre-left alliance The Olive Tree, whose leader was Romano Prodi.

The Pole for Freedoms was in opposition to the centre-left governments (of Prodi, Massimo D'Alema and Giuliano Amato) until 2000, when, after the rapprochement with the Lega Nord, became the House of Freedoms (CdL). The new CdL coalition won the 2001 general election and remained in government until the following general election in 2006.

== Composition ==
It was initially composed of the following political parties:

Party	Ideology	Leader
Forza Italia (FI)	Liberal conservatism	Silvio Berlusconi
National Alliance (AN)	National conservatism	Gianfranco Fini
Christian Democratic Centre (CCD)	Christian democracy	Pier Ferdinando Casini
United Christian Democrats (CDU)	Christian democracy	Rocco Buttiglione

== Election results ==
Election	Leader	Chamber of Deputies				Senate of the Republic			
Election	Leader	Votes	%	Seats	Position	Votes	%	Seats	Position
1996	Silvio Berlusconi	15,027,030	40.09	169 / 630	1st	12,185,020	37.35	116 / 315	2nd
