= Christian Democratic Centre =

Christian Democratic Centre Centro Cristiano Democratico
- Abbreviation: CCD
- Leader: Pier Ferdinando Casini
- Founded: 18 January 1994
- Dissolved: 6 December 2002
- Split from: Christian Democracy
- Merged into: Union of Christian and Centre Democrats
- Headquarters: Via dei Due Macelli 66, Rome
- Ideology: Christian democracy
- Political position: Centre to centre-right
- National affiliation: Pole of Freedoms/Pole of Good Government (1994), Pole for Freedoms (1996–2001), House of Freedoms (2001–02)
- European affiliation: European People's Party
- European Parliament group: European People's Party
- International affiliation: Christian Democrat International
- Colors: White

The Christian Democratic Centre (Italian: Centro Cristiano Democratico, CCD) was a Christian-democratic political party in Italy from 1994 to 2002. Formed from a right-wing split from Christian Democracy, the party joined the centre-right coalition, and was a member of the European People's Party (EPP).

== History ==
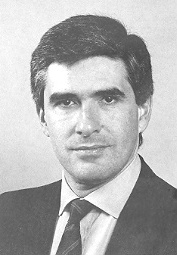
Pier Ferdinando Casini in 1994

The CCD was founded in January 1994 by members of Christian Democracy (DC) who opposed the party's transformation into the Italian People's Party (PPI), and advocated an alliance with Silvio Berlusconi's Forza Italia (FI), which was launched on the same day, while the PPI advocated a centrist alliance with the Segni Pact called Pact for Italy. Its leaders were Pier Ferdinando Casini and Clemente Mastella. The CCD represented the right wing of the defunct DC, while the PPI was largely the heir of the party's left wing, especially after the split of the United Christian Democrats (CDU) from the PPI in 1995.

In accordance with an agreement between the party presidents of CCD and PPI, the CCD "inherited" 15 percent of the DC's assets, while the PPI was awarded the remainder. In the 1994 general election the CCD joined FI as a member of the Pole of Freedoms in Northern Italy and the Pole of Good Government in Southern Italy, forming a joint list with FI, and gaining 27 deputies and 12 senators. After the election the CCD joined the Berlusconi I Cabinet, with Mastella minister of Labour and Francesco D'Onofrio minister of Education.

After the sudden fall of the government in December 1994, caused by Lega Nord's exit, a new general election took place in 1996. The CCD formed a joint list with the CDU. The alliance proved successful, gaining 5.8% of the vote, 30 deputies and 15 senators. However, as the centre-right lost the election to The Olive Tree centre-left coalition, the party was in opposition.

In 1998 Mastella and several MPs left the party to form, along with the CDU, the Christian Democrats for the Republic (CDR), which was later folded into the Democratic Union for the Republic (UDR) and supported the centre-left government led by Massimo D'Alema. In 1999 the UDR was transformed into the Union of Democrats for Europe (UDEUR), while the CDU was re-organised as an independent party and returned to the alliance with the CCD.

Once again, the CCD and the CDU formed a joint list (the so-called White Flower) for the 2001 general election, this time gaining only 3.2% of the vote, as part of the winning House of Freedoms coalition composed mainly of FI, National Alliance and Lega Nord. Casini was elected President of the Chamber of Deputies, while Carlo Giovanardi was appointed minister of Relations with Parliament in Berlusconi II Cabinet. In 2002 the CCD, the CDU and European Democracy (DE), which had won 2.3% in 2001, gave birth to the Union of Christian and Centre Democrats (UDC).

== Electoral results ==
=== Italian Parliament ===
Chamber of Deputies
Election year	Votes	%	Seats	+/−	Leader
1994	with Forza Italia		27 / 630	–	Pier Ferdinando Casini
1996	2,189,563 (7th) (Note: In a joint list with United Christian Democrats)	5.8	19 / 630	▼8	Pier Ferdinando Casini
2001	1,194,040 (8th)	3.2	24 / 630	▲5	Pier Ferdinando Casini

Senate of the Republic
Election year	Votes	%	Seats	+/−	Leader
1994	with PdL/PBG		12 / 315	–	Pier Ferdinando Casini
1996	with Pole for Freedoms		15 / 315	▲3	Pier Ferdinando Casini
2001	with House of Freedoms		21 / 315	▲6	Pier Ferdinando Casini

=== European Parliament ===
European Parliament
Election year	Votes	%	Seats	+/−	Leader
1994	with Forza Italia		3 / 87	–	Pier Ferdinando Casini
1999	805,320 (9th)	2.6	2 / 72	▼1	Pier Ferdinando Casini

== Leadership ==
- Secretary: Pier Ferdinando Casini (1994–2001), Marco Follini (2001–2002)
- President: Clemente Mastella (1994–1998), Sandro Fontana (1998–2002)
- Party Leader in the Chamber of Deputies: Carlo Giovanardi (1994–1998), Marco Follini (1998–2001)
- Party Leader in the Senate: Massimo Palombi (1994–1996), Francesco D'Onofrio (1996–2001)
- Party Leader in the European Parliament: Sandro Fontana (1994–1999), Raffaele Lombardo (1999–2002)
