= United Christian Democrats =

United Christian Democrats Cristiani Democratici Uniti
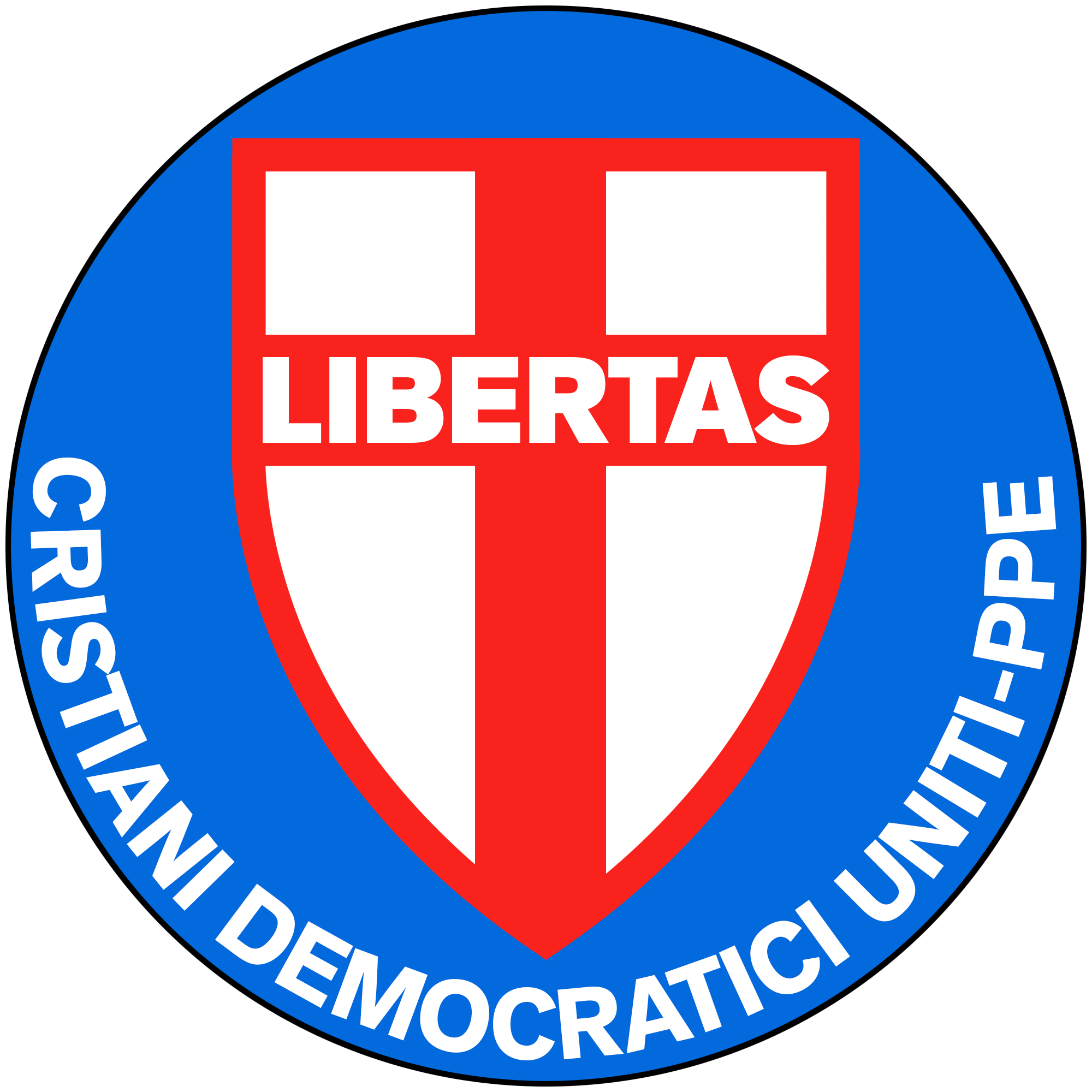
- Leader: Rocco Buttiglione
- Founded: 23 July 1995
- Dissolved: 6 December 2002
- Split from: Italian People's Party
- Merged into: Union of Christian and Centre Democrats
- Ideology: Christian democracy Social conservatism
- Political position: Centre to centre-right
- European affiliation: European People's Party
- European Parliament group: European People's Party
- Colors: Light blue

The United Christian Democrats (Italian: Cristiani Democratici Uniti, CDU) was a minor Christian democratic political party in Italy. The CDU was a member of the European People's Party from 1995 until 2002.

== History ==
The party was started in 1995 by splinters of the Italian People's Party (PPI) who wanted to join forces with Silvio Berlusconi's Forza Italia (FI). The split was led by Rocco Buttiglione (outgoing secretary of the PPI), Roberto Formigoni and Gianfranco Rotondi. The CDU's symbol used the crusader shield (scudo crociato) of Christian Democracy. In the 1995 regional elections the CDU formed joint lists with FI and Roberto Formigoni was elected President of Lombardy, while in 1996 it formed an alliance with the Christian Democratic Centre (CCD) for the 1996 general election, in which the CCD-CDU list scored 5.6%.

In June 1998 Buttiglione led the party into the Democratic Union for the Republic (UDR), a new Christian-democratic outfit launched by Francesco Cossiga and Clemente Mastella, who had left CCD to form the Christian Democrats for the Republic (CDR). In October, when Buttiglione briefly decided to support the centre-left government of Massimo D'Alema, along with the UDR, Roberto Formigoni, Raffaele Fitto, Maurizio Lupi and several regional councillors in Veneto, Lombardy and Piedmont left the party to form the Christian Democrats for Freedom, which was later merged into Forza Italia.

In February 1999 the UDR split between supporters of Cossiga, who formed the Union for the Republic (UpR), and the supporters of Mastella, who formed the Union of Democrats for Europe (UDEur). In the event, Buttiglione re-established the CDU as an independent party and started a rapprochement with Berlusconi.

In the 1999 European Parliament election the CDU obtained 2.2% and two MEPs, Buttiglione and Vitaliano Gemelli.

In the 2001 general election it formed an electoral alliance with CCD, known as the White Flower, gaining 3.2% of the vote. Following the election, Buttiglione was appointed Minister of European Affairs in Berlusconi II Cabinet. In December 2002 the CDU, the CCD and European Democracy (2.3% in 2001) were merged into the Union of Christian and Centre Democrats (UDC), of which Buttiglione was elected president, an office he would hold for twelve years.

== Electoral results ==
=== Italian Parliament ===
Chamber of Deputies
Election year	Votes	%	Seats	+/−	Leader
1996	2,189,563 (7th)	5.8 (Note: In a joint list with Christian Democratic Centre)	11 / 630	–	Rocco Buttiglione
2001	1,194,040 (8th)	3.2	17 / 630	▲6	Rocco Buttiglione

Senate of the Republic
Election year	Votes	%	Seats	+/−	Leader
1996	with Pole for Freedoms		10 / 315	–	Rocco Buttiglione
2001	with House of Freedoms		8 / 315	▼2	Rocco Buttiglione

=== European Parliament ===
European Parliament
Election year	Votes	%	Seats	+/−	Leader
1999	669,919 (11th)	2.2	2 / 72	–	Rocco Buttiglione

== Leadership ==
- Secretary: Rocco Buttiglione (1995–2002)
- President: Roberto Formigoni (1995–1998), Mario Tassone (1998–2002)
