= Italian Socialist Party (disambiguation) =

The Italian Socialist Party was an Italian political party founded 1892.

Italian Socialist Party may also refer to:

- New Italian Socialist Party
- Italian Socialist Party (2007)
- Socialist Party (Italy, 1996)
- Italian Revolutionary Socialist Party
- Italian Reformist Socialist Party
- Unitary Socialist Party (Italy, 1922)
- Unitary Socialist Party (Italy, 1949)
- Italian Democratic Socialist Party
- Italian Socialist Party of Proletarian Unity
- The Italian Socialists
- United Socialists (Italy)

== See also ==
- Italian Communist Party
