= Saverio Zavettieri =

Italian politician and trade unionist

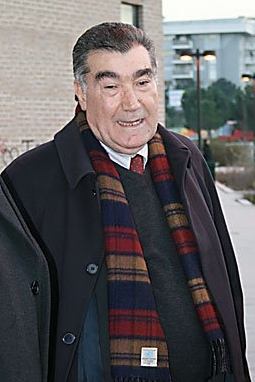

Member of the Chamber of Deputies
- In office 12 July 1983 – 14 April 1994

Personal details
- Born: 21 June 1942 (age 83) Bova Marina, Italy
- Party: PSI (until 1994); NPSI (2001–2006); SI (2006–2007); PS (2007–2009); SU (2009–2012); RI (since 2012)
- Profession: Politician, trade unionist

Saverio Zavettieri (born 21 June 1942) was an Italian politician and trade unionist.

== Biography ==
Trade unionist of the CGIL since 1960, Zavattieri entered politics in 1980. He was elected to the Chamber of Deputies in 1983, among the ranks of the Italian Socialist Party. He was re-elected also in 1987 and 1992.

In 2000 he was appointed Assessor for Education, Cultural Heritage, University and Research in the regional government of Calabria led by the centre-right president Giuseppe Chiaravalloti. Subsequently he joined the New PSI.

In February 2004 he suffered a very serious attack: two assassins tried to kill him in his home in Bova Marina and only the armored glass of the window prevented the bullet from killing him. He declared that the attack was linked to a mixture of politics and the 'Ndrangheta, also linking it to the murder of Francesco Fortugno that would have occurred the next year.

In 2005, at the fifth congress of the New PSI, he sanctioned with Bobo Craxi the break with the Casa delle Libertà, adhering to the center-left alignment, but did not agree with the agreement of the SDI of Enrico Boselli with the Italian Radicals and founded The Socialists.

On 10–11 March 2007, in Rimini, at the convention of The Socialists' party (that was renamed "The Italian Socialists"), he was proclaimed, by unanimous vote, national secretary of the party, re-launching the idea of socialist unity. In the same year Zavattieri joined, with his party, in the Socialist constituent assembly, which led in the autumn to the founding of the Socialist Party. In 2009 Zavettieri, very critical of the party secretary Enrico Boselli, left the Socialist Party and on 10 October 2009, together with Bobo Craxi, founded the United Socialists.

On 26 May 2019 he has been elected Mayor of Bova Marina, with the 53.8% of the vote.
