= Young Italy (2004) =

Italian social-democratic political association

Young Italy (Giovane Italia) was a social-democratic political association close to Forza Italia and later to The People of Freedom, a political party in Italy.

Named after the organisation founded by Giuseppe Mazzini in 1831, it was founded on 16 July 2004. It was launched and led by Stefania Craxi, daughter of Bettino, a long-time leader of the Italian Socialist Party (PSI) and former Prime Minister of Italy, and was the political arm of the Fondazione Craxi, a think tank, also led by Stefania, that takes care of Craxi's memory and archives.

Leading members of the Young Italy included Maurizio Sacconi, Margherita Boniver, Renzo Tondo, Giuliano Cazzola, Luigi Fabbri and Sergio Pizzolante, all former members of the PSI. Despite its social-democratic roots, they were keen supporters of the European People's Party.

In 2011 Young Italy was replaced by the Italian Reformists, also led by Stefania Craxi.
