= Conference of the Three Internationals =

The Conference of the Three Internationals took place in Berlin between 2–6 April 1922. The three internationals were the Berne International, the International Working Union of Socialist Parties (also known as the Vienna International or the 2½ International) and the Communist International or 3rd International.

== Background ==
The Vienna International had been founded on February 27, 1921, uniting left-wing social democratic parties. Friedrich Adler of the Social Democratic Party of Austria (SPÖ) was appointed secretary, something which reinforced the influence of Austromarxism amongst the adherents.

The Berne International agreed to attend on condition that three issues were added to the agenda: Georgia, socialist prisoners in Russia and the role of Communist cells in the social democratic trade unions.

== Attendees ==
The attendees sat around a T-shaped table with the 2½ International occupying the cross piece, with the 2nd and 3rd internationals facing one another.

=== 2nd International ===
Delegates:

- Camille Huysmans (Belgium)
- Emile Vandervelde (Belgium)
- Thorvald Stauning (Denmark)
- Otto Wels (Germany)
- Harry Gosling (United Kingdom)
- Ramsay MacDonald (United Kingdom)
- Tom Shaw (United Kingdom)
- Irakli Tsereteli (Georgia)
- Willem Vliegen (Netherlands)
- Gustav Moeller (Sweden)

Guests: Henri de Man (Belgium), Adolf Braun, Charlotte Lütkens and Victor Schiff (Germany), Ernest Bevin, Margaret Cox and William Gillies (United Kingdom).

=== 2½ International ===
Delegates:

- Arthur Crispien (Germany)
- R. C. Wallhead (United Kingdom)
- Paul Faure (France)
- Jean Longuet (France)
- Brūno Kalniņš (Latvia)
- Otto Bauer (Austria)
- Friedrich Adler (Austria)
- Julius Martov (Russia)
- Robert Grimm (Switzerland)
- Karl Čermak (Czechoslovakia)

Guests: Wilhelm Dittmann (Germany), Alexandre Marie Desrousseaux and Adéodat Compère-Morel (France), Berl Locker and Shlomo Kaplansky (Poale Zion, Raphael Abramovitch and Alexander Schreider (Russia).

=== 3rd International ===
Delegates:

- Clara Zetkin (Germany)
- Ludovic-Oscar Frossard (France)
- Alfred Rosmer (France)
- Amadeo Bordiga (Italy)
- Sen Katayama (Japan)
- Kosta Novaković (Yugoslavia)
- Adolf Warski (Poland)
- Nikolai Bukharin (Soviet Union)
- Karl Radek (Soviet Union)
- Bohumír Šmeral (Czechoslovakia)

Guests: Bujanović and Vojislav Vujović (Yugoslavia)

The Italian Socialist Party which was not affiliated to any international organisation, was represented with Giacinto Menotti Serrati as speaker and two guests (Adelchi Baratono and Domenico Fioritto). Additionally, other important socialist leaders such as Viktor Chernov and Fyodor Dan were present as journalists.
