= Il sorpasso =

Il sorpasso can refer to:

- Il Sorpasso (The Easy Life), a 1962 Italian movie
- Il sorpasso (economics), a 1987 announcement by the Italian government that its economy had surpassed that of the United Kingdom
