= Young Italy (disambiguation) =

Young Italy was an Italian political movement found in 1831 which advocated a united Italian republic.

Young Italy may also refer to:

- Young Italy (1954), youth wing of the Italian Social Movement
- Young Italy (2004), political association led by Stefania Craxi
- Young Italy (2009), youth wing of The People of Freedom
