= United Socialists (Italy) =

United Socialists Socialisti Uniti
- Secretary: Saverio Zavettieri
- Founded: 2009
- Dissolved: 2011
- Preceded by: The Italian Socialists
- Merged into: Italian Reformists
- Headquarters: Via della Panetteria, 1/C – 00187 Rome
- Ideology: Social democracy
- Political position: Centre

United Socialists – PSI (Italian: Socialisti Uniti – PSI) was a minor social-democratic political party in Italy. Its leaders were Bobo Craxi and Saverio Zavettieri.

== History ==
The party, which was launched at a convention in Rome on 10 October 2009, would emerge from the merger of The Italian Socialists, the faction of the Socialist Party (PS) around Craxi (who was the founder of The Italian Socialists in 2005) and possibly some other figures from the late Italian Socialist Party. Craxi had earlier left the PS because he did not agree with its merger into Left Ecology Freedom (SEL). However, in November, the PS refused to merge into SEL too. Subsequently, Craxi renewed his party membership.

In 2011, the party merged into the Italian Reformists.
