= Nicola Bombacci =

Italian politician and revolutionary (1879–1945)

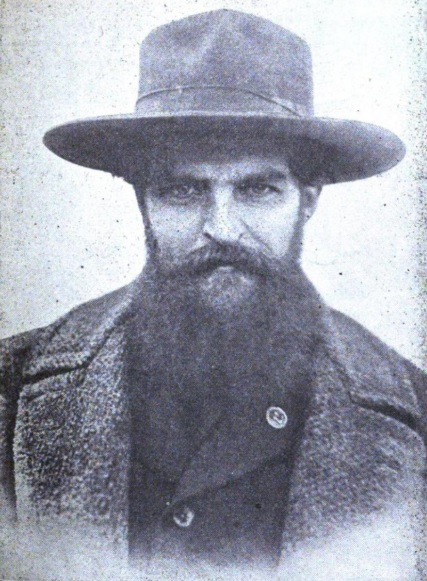
- Bombacci in 1919

Secretary of the Italian Socialist Party
- In office 11 October 1919 – 25 February 1920
- Preceded by: Costantino Lazzari
- Succeeded by: Egidio Gennari

Member of the Chamber of Deputies
- In office 1 December 1919 – 25 January 1925
- Constituency: Romagna

Personal details
- Born: 24 October 1879 Civitella di Romagna, Forlì, Italy
- Died: 28 April 1945 (aged 65) Dongo, Como, Italy
- Party: Italian Socialist Party (1911–1921); Communist Party of Italy (1921–1927); Republican Fascist Party (1943–1945)
- Height: 1.74 m (5 ft 9 in)
- Spouse: Erissene Focaccia (m. 1905)
- Profession: Politician, journalist, revolutionary, labour unionist

Nicola Bombacci (24 October 1879 – 28 April 1945) was an Italian Marxist revolutionary and later fascist politician. A leading figure in the Italian Socialist Party during and after World War I, he was inspired by the October Revolution and became a founding member of the Communist Party of Italy in 1921. After being expelled from the party in 1927, he gradually moved toward fascism, eventually allying with Benito Mussolini and the Italian Social Republic during World War II. He was captured and executed by communist partisans in April 1945.

== Biography ==
=== Early life ===
Nicola Bombacci was born in a hamlet of the comune (municipality) of Civitella di Romagna, in the province of Forlì, on 24 October 1879.

Bombacci's family made their living farming land owned by the parish of Don Nicolò Ghini, after whom Bombacci was named. While still a child, he moved with his family to Meldola, a town in the lower Valle del Bidente, where he finished elementary school and where his family would settle permanently. In 1895, he was enrolled in a Forlì seminary.

After leaving the seminary for health reasons, he continued his studies at the age of twenty-one at the Giosuè Carducci boarding school in Forlimpopoli to become an elementary school teacher. He was enrolled in the third-year class, the same one attended by Benito Mussolini, who was four years younger. Bombacci later graduated in 1901.

=== Teaching career ===
His teaching career began with minor postings in the province of Reggio Emilia. He left the region for his first significant post in Villa Santina in the province of Udine from 1904 to 1905, then returned to Emilia the following year to a post in Baricella. During this period, he married Erissene Focaccia, who was also a teacher. In 1906, the family moved to Cadelbosco di Sopra, in Reggio Emilia, where they went through a period of financial hardship before he was given substitute-teaching posts, first in Villa Argine and then in Cadelbosco di Sotto. In 1907, he was granted a permanent teaching post in Monticelli d'Ongina, in the province of Piacenza.

=== Entry into socialist politics ===
In 1909 he gave up teaching to devote himself to politics. He became active in the labour movement across various areas and cities, working between Crema, Piacenza, and Cesena, where in 1910 he took on the role of secretary of the local socialist federation and the directorship of the weekly periodical Il Cuneo. He would seize this opportunity to move his activities near Meldola, where his family still lived. In 1911 he became a member of the National Council of the General Confederation of Labour (CGdL). In May of that same year, Bombacci resigned from the Cesena federation. In the following months, he withdrew from political activity, before returning in November as secretary of the Camera del Lavoro of Modena.

In Modena, during World War I, he rose to prominence, becoming the undisputed leader of the local socialist movement, so much so that Mussolini himself (who had known him since their school days together at Forlimpopoli) called him "the Kaiser of Modena". Between the Balkan Wars and the Russian Revolution, he simultaneously served as secretary of the Camera del Lavoro, secretary of the local socialist federation, and director of the socialist periodical Il Domani.

=== Italian Socialist Party (1917–1921) ===
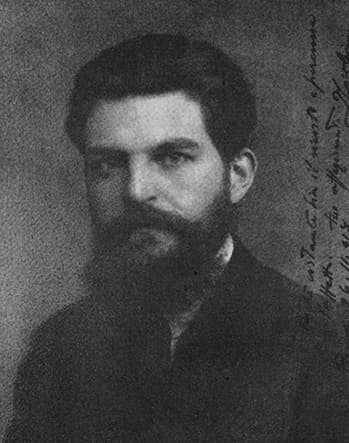
Bombacci in Rome at the directorate of the Italian Socialist Party, November 1917.

In July 1917, Bombacci was appointed a member of the Directorate and vice secretary of the Italian Socialist Party (PSI), working alongside party secretary Costantino Lazzari in drafting the famous newsletters sent to the party's local branches, and alongside periodical director Giacinto Menotti Serrati in the effort to sway the workers' movement towards the maximalist current.

In 1918, with the arrests of Lazzari in January and Serrati in May, he was left as practically the sole remaining member of the party leadership. He himself was arrested for 'defeatism' in January and tried while at liberty, until his subsequent arrest on 31 October and release on 20 November.

A proponent of a strongly anti-reformist line, he centralized and imposed a strict hierarchy on the whole of Italian socialism. The party's provincial federations and the Gruppo Parlamentare Socialista (GPS) became directly subordinate to the PSI's Directorate, which the trade unions and cooperative organizations were likewise tied to.

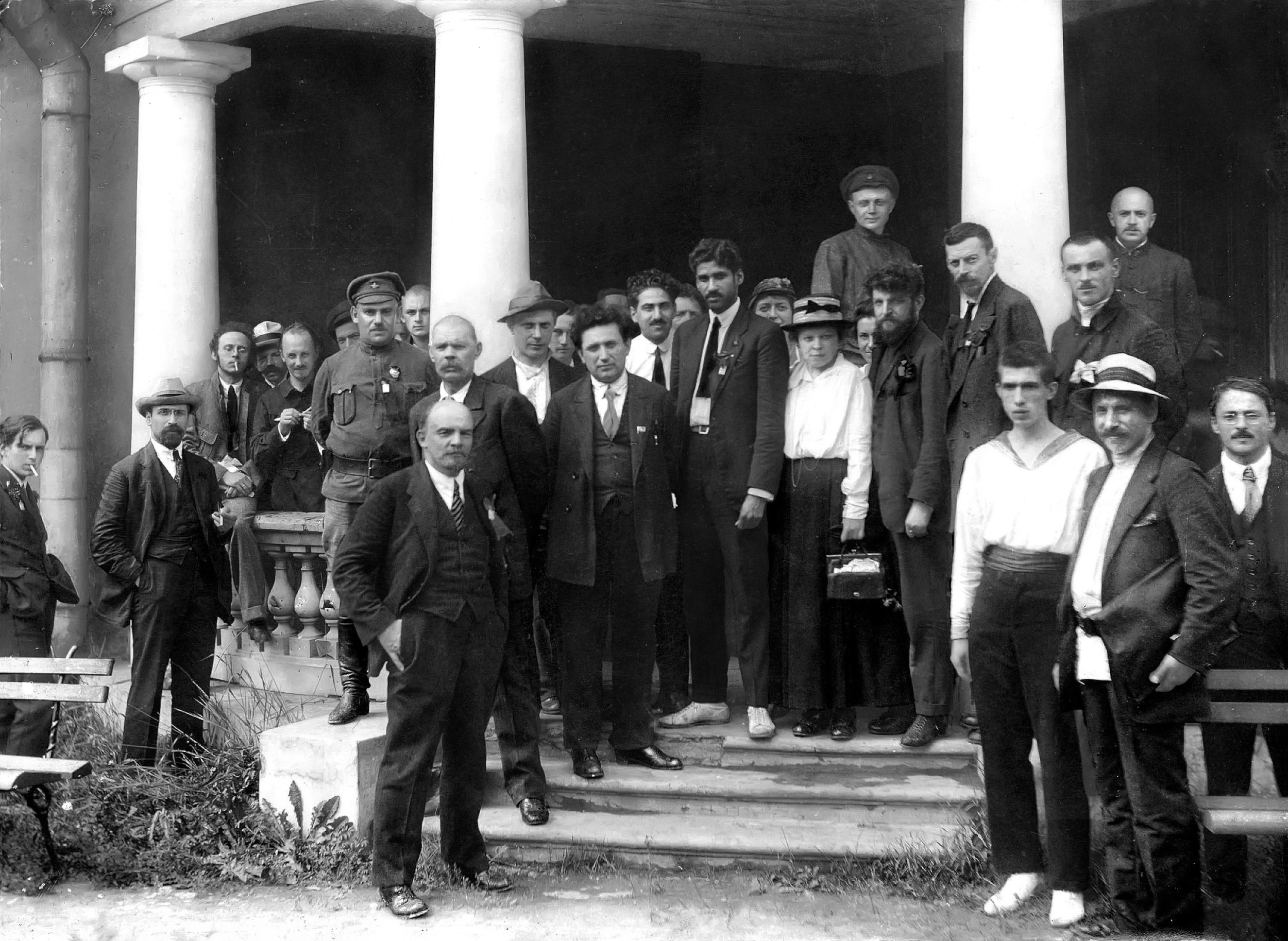
Bombacci (second row, third from the right) among the delegates of the Second Congress of the Communist International, including Lenin, 1920

In October 1919, together with Serrati, Egidio Gennari, and Igino Salvadori, he drafted the programme of the maximalist faction, which won out at the PSI's 16th National Congress (Bologna, 5–8 October 1919). He was elected Party secretary (11 October 1919) and, the following month, in the first general elections of the postwar period (16 November 1919), was elected to the Chamber of Deputies for the Bologna constituency with over a hundred thousand votes, becoming one of the most powerful and eminent figures of maximalist socialism during the Biennio Rosso. In the 1919 general election, Bombacci led the PSI to its best result ever, with the party winning 32.3% of the vote and becoming the largest in parliament.

In January 1920, he presented a plan to establish Soviet-like councils in Italy, which received little support and much criticism, and sparked a heated theoretical debate in the party press. The rejection of his proposal to establish these councils led Bombacci, on 25 February 1920, to cede the position of secretary of the PSI to Egidio Gennari. In April, he became the first Italian socialist to meet with Bolshevik representatives, in Copenhagen, and during the summer of the same year he was among the members of the Italian delegation that traveled to Soviet Russia, also taking part in the Second World Congress of the Communist International.

Having founded the Communist Faction in autumn 1920 together with Antonio Gramsci, Amadeo Bordiga, Egidio Gennari, and Antonio Graziadei, and having also served as director of the periodical Il Comunista, Bombacci firmly backed the split at the 17th National Congress of the PSI (Livorno, 15-21 January 1921), becoming one of the founders of the Communist Party of Italy, the Italian section of the Third International (PCd'I), and a member of its Central Committee.

=== Italian Communist Party (1921–1927) ===
Re-elected as a deputy in the 1921 general election for the Trieste constituency, Bombacci, lacking a faction of his own within the new party, found himself somewhat isolated from both Gramsci, Togliatti, Terracini, and Tasca's Ordine Nuovo group and Bordiga's abstentionist faction. He aligned himself with the right wing of the PCd'I alongside Francesco Misiano, favoring a rapprochement with the maximalists and opposing the sectarian, ideologically rigid party that Bordiga wanted. Despite his break with socialism, he remained a friend of Mussolini due to their shared past as fellow Massimalisti in the PSI.

Just before the March on Rome, Bombacci became the editor-in-chief of the sole legal edition (dated 10 September 1922) of Il Fanciullo Proletario, a communist illustrated periodical intended for children.

Bombacci was soon pushed out of the leadership bodies of the PCd'I, beginning with its Central Committee. The controversy reached its peak in November 1923, when the PCd'I's Executive Committee unilaterally decided to expel him without consulting the Communist International. Bombacci, then secretary of the Gruppo Parlamentare Comunista, was accused of having suggested a possible union between the Bolshevik revolution and the fascist one in a speech to the Chamber of Deputies on 30 November 1923. In January 1924, Bombacci's term as a deputy in the Chamber ended. He was recalled to Moscow, where he represented the Italian delegation at the funeral of Lenin. There, Grigory Zinoviev decided to reinstate him in the PCd'I.

His estrangement from the Party became evident, and in 1927 the exiled Communist leadership decreed his final expulsion, for embracing a pro-fascist position. His expulsion was formalized with a terse announcement in an issue of L'Unità: "Nicola Bombacci is expelled from the Communist Party of Italy for political unworthiness."

=== Drift toward fascism ===
During what have been called the "years of silence," Bombacci continued to live in Rome with his family, though his collaboration with the Soviet Embassy appears not to have extended long after 1930. Given his difficult financial situation and his son Wladimiro's serious health problems, Mussolini granted him some financial assistance for his son's medical treatment and found him a position at the International Educational Cinematographic Institute, part of the League of Nations, in Rome. He never officially joined the National Fascist Party.

From 1933 onward, Bombacci gradually and increasingly drifted towards fascism, until 1935 when he had definitively embraced it. Mussolini, at the beginning of 1936, permitted him to found the magazine La Verità (inspired by Pravda), a political magazine financed by the Ministry of Popular Culture with an initial print run of 25,000 copies and aligned with the positions of Mussolini's regime. In the journal, Bombacci expressed his adhesion to both Fascism and Communism, writing: "Fascism made a great Social Revolution. Mussolini and Lenin. Corporate and Soviet fascist state, Rome and Moscow. We have gone far enough to regret it; we have nothing to apologize for, for both in the present and in the past we are driven by the same ideal: the triumph of work." Aside from a few interruptions caused by opposition from hardline Fascist figures such as Roberto Farinacci and Achille Starace, it lasted until July 1943.

A great social revolution is underway. This is the hour of the collective. (...) Today, as yesterday, the same ideal moves us: the triumph of labor. We have fought for this triumph for thirty-five years. (...) Today history places before our eyes the experiment of Mussolini. It is no longer merely a doctrine, it is a new order boldly launching itself onto the main road of social justice.

— La Verità, 6 April 1936

Various other former socialists also contributed to the project, including Alberto and Mario Malatesta, Ezio Riboldi, Arturo Labriola, Walter Mocchi, Giovanni and Renato Bitelli, and Angelo Scucchia. By the beginning of the 1940s, Bombacci had officially and definitively distanced himself from communism.

=== Italian Social Republic (1943–1945) ===
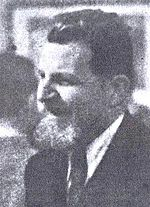
Bombacci in his later life

Comrades! Look me in the face, comrades! You are now asking yourselves whether I am the same socialist agitator, the founder of the Communist Party, the friend of Lenin that I once was. Yes indeed, I am still the same man! I have never renounced the ideals for which I have fought and for which I will always fight. I stood beside Lenin in the radiant days of the revolution, I believed Bolshevism was at the vanguard of the workers' triumph, but then I came to realize the deception.

— 15 March 1945, Genoa, speech addressed to the Blackshirts

After the fall of the fascist regime on 25 July 1943 and, in September, the liberation of Mussolini from Gran Sasso and the creation of the Italian Social Republic (RSI), Bombacci decided voluntarily to go to Salò, where he became a sort of advisor to Mussolini. He joined Mussolini's entourage and frequently visited the dictator at Villa Feltrinelli. According to R. J. B. Bosworth, Bombacci "almost became a friend" of Mussolini at this time. He was the author of the theory of economic socialization, prepared for the Congress of Verona. Nicknamed "the Red Pope" by the bourgeoisie, Bombacci told a crowd in Genoa in 1945 that "Stalin will never achieve socialism; rather Mussolini will."

During the final months of the war (September 1944 to March 1945), he continued to champion fascism as the one true revolution and the fulfillment of the triumph of labour, giving lectures and speaking to workers in public squares across northern Italy. From then on, he enjoyed greater room and visibility, and he devoted himself completely to fascism, drawing on his natural gift for public speaking and his closeness to the working classes. He would publish several pamphlets on the dangers of Bolshevism and the Stalinist degeneration of communist principles.

The project of socializing businesses and the means of production is attributed specifically to Bombacci. Heavily promoted by the Republican Fascist regime, it was approved by the RSI's council of ministers in February 1944, but it was secretly boycotted by industrialists and strongly opposed by communists. The project was also viewed with suspicion by the occupying Nazi German forces, and greatly unpopular amongst Italian workers, who responded with strikes. It even descended into farce when it came time to vote for the management councils, with names of celebrities such as Henry Ford and Greta Garbo being put forward as candidates.

=== Death ===
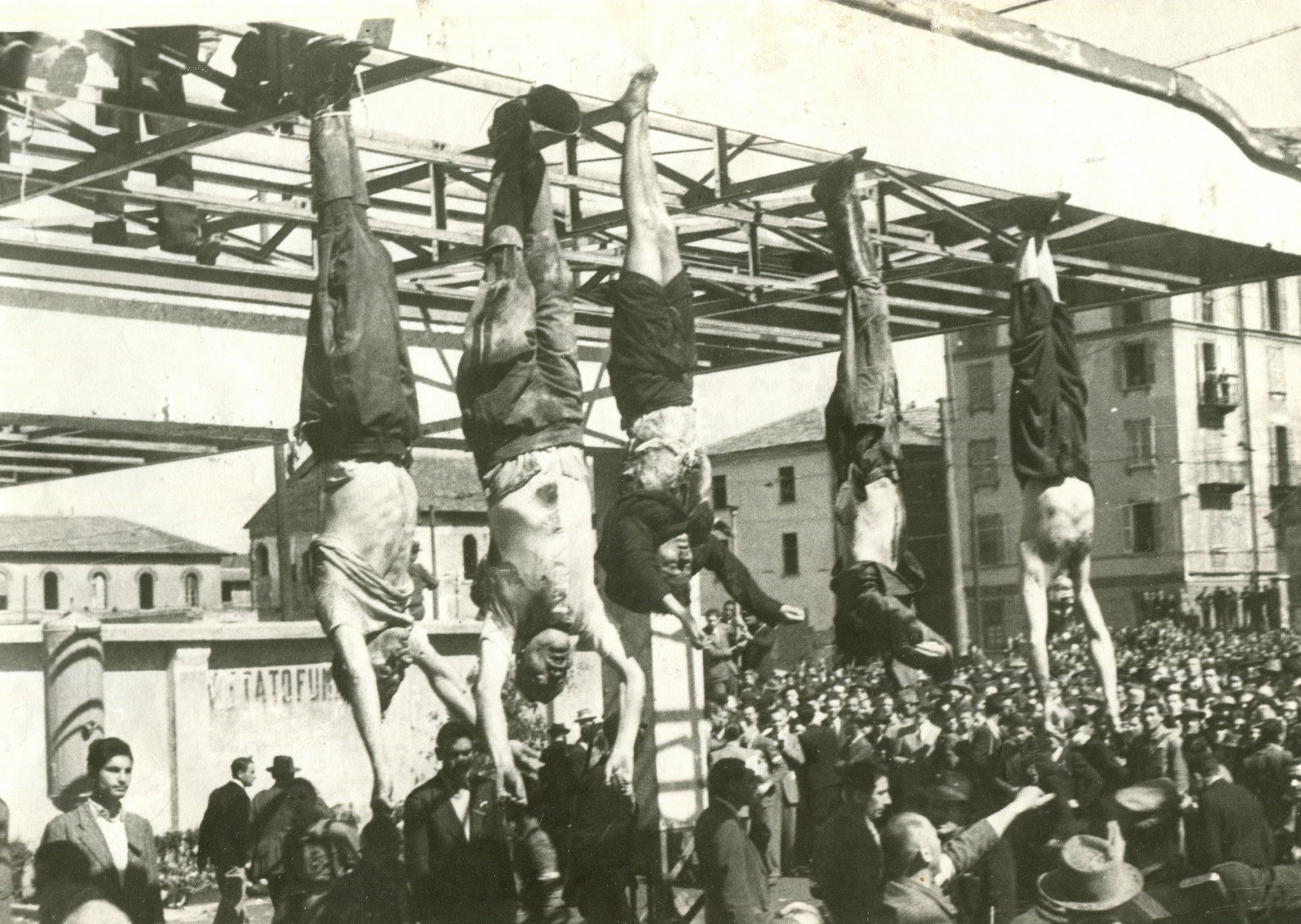
From left to right, the dead bodies of Bombacci, Mussolini, Petacci, Pavolini and Starace in Piazzale Loreto, 1945.

Bombacci, then aged 65, remained at Mussolini's side until the very end. Partisans captured him near Lake Como, in the same car as the Duce, and shot him along with other fascist hierarchs, including Alessandro Pavolini and Fernando Mezzasoma, at Dongo on 28 April 1945 (Mussolini, by contrast, died at Giulino di Mezzegra). His last words, spoken just before he was shot, were either "Long live Italy! Long live Socialism!" or, in other accounts, "Long live Mussolini! Long live Socialism!", shouted at the firing squad. What is certain, in both versions, is that his final words hailed socialism.

On the morning of 29 April, he was hung by the feet at the Piazzale Loreto petrol station in Milan, alongside Benito Mussolini, Clara Petacci, and several other fascist hierarchs. On the document attesting to his execution, beneath his name was handwritten "Supertraditore" ("Super-traitor").

Four days after his death, his old friend and comrade Victor Serge read of the event in a newspaper in Mexico, where he was living in exile, and wrote several pages in his journal concerning him. Engaging in what he called "practical psychology", Serge tried to imagine how a former communist could become a fascist, writing: "Among some Italians, particularly among the ex-Marxists and ex-syndicalists, two visions became apparent: that with the liberal democracies exhausted and socialism weakened, the corporatist regimes were going to impose their new formulas; and that through this narrow gate would pass collectivism, the precondition for a socialism different from that desired by the nineteenth century, ... corresponding better to man's basic nature."

== Works ==
- Bombacci, Nicola, Per la Costituzione dei Soviet. Relazione presentata al Congresso Nazionale [For the Establishment of the Soviets: Report Presented to the National Congress], Pistoia, Tipografia F.lli Cialdini, 1920.
- Bombacci, Nicola, Le vere memorie di Nicola Bombacci [The True Memoirs of Nicola Bombacci], published under the pseudonym "Frièland", Bologna, Cooperativa Grafica fra ex combattenti, 1923.
- Bombacci, Nicola, Il mio pensiero sul bolscevismo [My Thoughts on Bolshevism], Rome, La Verità, 1941.
- Bombacci, Nicola, I contadini nella Russia di Stalin [The Peasants in Stalin's Russia], Rome, Novissima, 1942.
- Bombacci, Nicola, Lavoratori ascoltate. Questo è il bolscevismo [Workers, Listen: This Is Bolshevism], Rome, s.n., 1942.
- Bombacci, Nicola, Paradiso o inferno? Vita quotidiana nell'U.R.S.S. [Paradise or Hell? Daily Life in the U.S.S.R.], Rome, La Verità, 1942.
- Bombacci, Nicola, I contadini nell'Italia di Mussolini [The Peasants in Mussolini's Italy], Rome, s.n., 1943.
- Bombacci, Nicola, Dove va la Russia? (Dal comunismo al panslavismo) [Where Is Russia Going? (From Communism to Pan-Slavism)], Padua, Minerva, 1944.
- Bombacci, Nicola, Questo è il comunismo [This Is Communism], Venice, Casa ed. delle Edizioni popolari, 1944.

== See also ==
- Italo-Soviet Pact
- Jacques Doriot
