= List of presidents of the Province of Palermo =

President of the Province of Palermo
- Presidente della Provincia di Palermo
- Inaugural holder: Francesco Radicella
- Formation: 1889
- Final holder: Giovanni Avanti
- Abolished: 2013
- Superseded by: Metropolitan mayor of Palermo

The president of the Province of Palermo was the head of the provincial administration of Palermo, a local government authority in Sicily, Italy.

The province was replaced in 2016 by the Metropolitan City of Palermo.

== List ==
=== Presidents of the Provincial Deputation ===
No.	Portrait	Name	Term of office		Party
No.	Portrait	Name	Start	End	Party
1		Francesco Radicella	1890	1893	
2		Mario Giuseppe Puglia	1893	1896	
3		Casimiro Pisari	1895	1896	
4		Biagio La Manna	1896	1903	
5		Gioacchino Seminara	1903	1916 ?	

=== Presidents of the Province ===
Portrait	Name	Term of office		Party
Portrait	Name	Start	End	Party
	Michele Reina	10 January 1962	7 July 1964	Christian Democracy
	Francesco Urso	7 July 1964	13 March 1965	Christian Democracy
	Nino Riggio	13 March 1965	9 October 1967	Christian Democracy
	Giovanni Celauro	9 October 1967	11 December 1969	Christian Democracy
	Rosario Odierna (extraordinary commissioner)	11 December 1969	2 October 1970	―
	Francesco Sturzo	2 October 1970	2 February 1972	Christian Democracy
	Giovanni Celauro	2 February 1972	29 July 1975	Christian Democracy
	Ernesto Di Fresco	29 July 1975	11 November 1976	Christian Democracy
	Gaspare Giganti	11 November 1976	30 June 1978	Christian Democracy
	Nino Gristina	30 June 1978	13 September 1980	Christian Democracy
	Francesco Bombace	13 September 1980	16 April 1981	Christian Democracy
	Ernesto Di Fresco	16 April 1981	25 November 1982	Christian Democracy
	Marcantonio Bellomare (acting)	25 November 1982	8 March 1983	Christian Democracy
	Francesco Candioto	8 March 1983	26 April 1983	Christian Democracy
	Girolamo Di Benedetto	26 April 1983	5 May 1987	Christian Democracy
	Salvatore Governanti (acting)	5 May 1987	10 August 1987	Christian Democracy
	Girolamo Di Benedetto	11 August 1987	14 March 1990	Christian Democracy
	Vincenzo Tarsia (extraordinary commissioner)	15 March 1990	11 September 1990	―
	Carlo Fanara (extraordinary commissioner)	15 March 1990	11 September 1990	―
	Francesco Caldaronello	12 September 1990	27 May 1993	Christian Democracy
	Paolo Borsellino	28 May 1993	7 February 1994	Christian Democracy
	Maria Grazia Ambrosini	8 February 1994	13 June 1994	Italian People's Party
	Francesco Musotto	13 June 1994	15 December 1995	Forza Italia
	Pietro Puccio	1 July 1996	25 May 1998	Democratic Party of the Left
	Francesco Musotto	25 May 1998	28 May 2003	Forza Italia
	Francesco Musotto	28 May 2003	12 February 2008	Forza Italia
	Patrizia Monterosso (regional commissioner)	4 March 2008	15 June 2008	―
	Giovanni Avanti	17 June 2008	18 June 2013	Union of the Centre
	Domenico Tucci (extraordinary commissioner)	18 June 2013	31 October 2014	―
	Carmelo Messina (regional extraordinary commissioner)	31 October 2014	3 December 2014	―
	Manlio Munafò (regional extraordinary commissioner)	3 December 2014	8 April 2015	―
	Carlo Turriciano (regional extraordinary commissioner)	8 April 2015	24 April 2015	―
	Manlio Munafò (regional extraordinary commissioner)	24 April 2015	7 June 2016	―

== Sources ==
- "Storia amministrativa dell'ente". Ministero dell'Interno.
- "Rivista della Provincia di Palermo" (PDF) (in Italian). Città metropolitana di Palermo.
- Menichini, Piera (2005). "I presidenti delle Province dall'Unità alla Grande guerra: repertorio analitico". Storia Amministrazione Costituzione (13): 270–271.
