= Presidential Council of Tax Justice =

Tax commission of Italy

The Presidential Council of Tax Justice (CPGT) is the self-governing body of the Italian tax commissions.

== History ==
It was introduced by Legislative Decree 31 December 1992, n. 545, in analogy to the High Council of the Judiciary. Its composition was later modified by law 21 November 2000, n. 342, which added the members elected by Parliament in parallel with the provisions of the Constitution for the High Council of the Judiciary. In this way, an attempt was made to release the Presidency Council for tax justice from the Ministry of Economy and Finance, the department in which tax magistrates are incardinated who, moreover, unlike other special judges, are honorary magistrates.

The annual report on the progress of tax justice is presented to the Minister of Economy and Finance and not to the Head of State.

== Structure ==
Council of Tax Justice is established by decree of the President of the Republic, and is based in Rome, via Solferino 15.

It is composed of:

- eleven tax magistrates elected by and from among the members of the provincial and regional tax commissions;
- four members elected by the Parliament, two by the Chamber of Deputies and two by the Senate of the Republic with an absolute majority, from among university professors in legal matters or persons authorized to defend before tax commissions who have been registered in their respective professional registers for at least twelve years.

The presidential council remains in office for four years and elects from among its members the president (chosen from one of the members nominated by parliament) and two vice presidents .

The current Council of the Presidency of Tax Justice (decree of the President of the Republic 31/12/2013), Antonio Leone, took office on 18 September 2018, operates through the referring commissions and the plenum.
