= Francesco Candioto =

Italian politician (1923–1998)

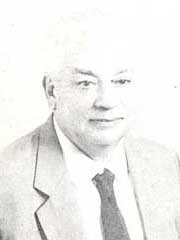

Senator of the Republic of Italy
- In office 9 July 1987 – 14 April 1994

President of the Province of Palermo
- In office 8 March 1983 – 26 April 1983
- Preceded by: Ernesto Di Fresco
- Succeeded by: Girolamo Di Benedetto

Personal details
- Born: 4 March 1923 Termini Imerese, Province of Palermo, Kingdom of Italy
- Died: 27 October 1998 (aged 75)
- Party: Christian Democracy; Italian Liberal Party
- Occupation: Notary

Francesco Candioto (4 March 1923 – 27 October 1998) was an Italian politician and notary who served as a member of the Senate of the Republic during the 10th and 11th Legislatures of Italy. He also briefly served as president of the Province of Palermo in 1983 and served as mayor of Termini Imerese on several occasions.
