= Egidio Gennari =

Italian politician (1876–1942)

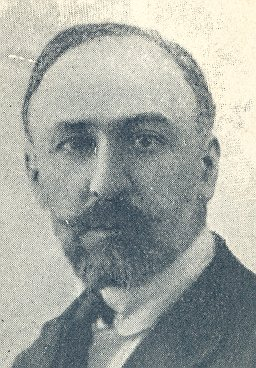

Secretary General of the Italian Socialist Party
- In office 1920–1921
- Preceded by: Nicola Bombacci
- Succeeded by: Giovanni Bacci

Personal details
- Born: 20 April 1876 Albano Laziale, Kingdom of Italy
- Died: 8 April 1942 (aged 65) Gorky, Russia, Soviet Union
- Party: Italian Socialist Party; Italian Communist Party
- Occupation: Teacher

Egidio Gennari (20 April 1876 – 8 April 1942) was an Italian communist politician who was among the founders of Italian Communist Party. He served at the Italian Parliament between 1924 and 1926 when he was forced to leave Italy due to the repression of the Fascist government. He died in exile in the Soviet Union.

== Biography ==
Gennari was born in Albano Laziale on 20 April 1876. He was a teacher by profession. He joined the Italian Socialist Party in 1897 and headed its left wing. He adopted an internationalist approach during World War I. He served as the political secretary of the Italian Socialist Party in 1920 replacing Nicola Bombacci in the post. He was a vice chairman of Presidium of the Third World Congress of the Comintern. He also participated in several plenums of the Communist International or Comintern in the 1920s. His pseudonym in these meetings was Maggi.

In 1921 Gennari cofounded the Italian Communist Party. In 1923 the party leader Amadeo Bordiga was arrested, and the Comintern Executive Committee assigned a group of party members to lead the party, including Gennari, Mauro Scoccimarro, Palmiro Togliatti, Angelo Tasca and Umberto Terracini. In the party Gennari was part of the faction led by Antonio Gramsci. Gennari was elected as a deputy in 1924.

In 1926 he settled in the Soviet Union when the Fascist repression intensified. Gennari represented the Italian Communist Party in an international conference organized against war and fascism held in Paris on 23 and 24 November 1935 shortly after the invasion of Abyssinia by the Italian Fascist forces. He died after a serious illness in Gorky, Russia, on 8 April 1942.

== Works ==
- I compiti attuali del Partito socialista [The Current Tasks of the Socialist Party], 1920.
- Relazione politica della direzione del partito al congresso di Livorno [Political Report of the Direction of the Party at the Congress of Livorno], 1921.
- Per combattere il fascismo e il capitalismo: fronte unico! (lettera agli operai italiani) [To Combat Fascism and Capitalism: A United Front! (Letter to Italian Workers)], 1933.
- Italia in cammino [Italy on the Move], 1936.
- Chi siamo e cosa vogliamo [Who We Are and What We Want], 1937.
