= La Verità (magazine) =

Monthly political magazine in Italy (1936–1943)

- Editor: Nicola Bombacci
- Categories: Political magazine
- Frequency: Monthly
- Founder: Nicola Bombacci
- Founded: 1936
- Final issue: 1943
- Country: Kingdom of Italy
- Based in: Rome
- Language: Italian

La Verità was an Italian monthly political magazine which existed between 1936 and 1943. It was based in Rome. The magazine is known for its founder, Nicola Bombacci, a controversial political figure.

== History and profile ==
La Verità was launched by Nicola Bombacci in Rome in 1936. Bombacci also edited the magazine which came out monthly. From 1940 to its closure in 1943 the editors of La Verità were Bombacci and Ezio Riboldi. It supported both fascist and Bolshevik views. It received subsidy from the Italian state.
