= Francesco Musotto =

Italian politician (1947–2025)

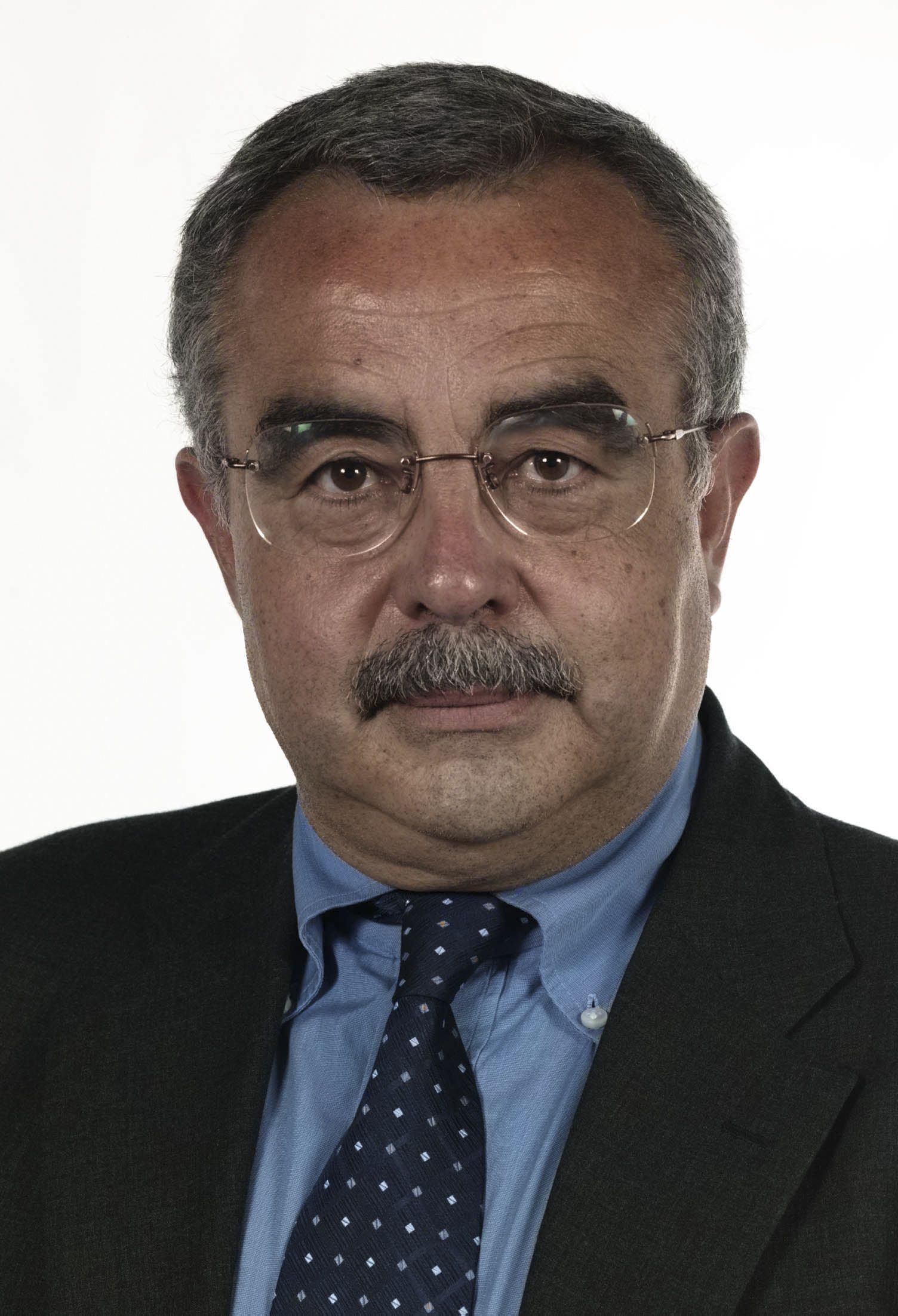
Musotto in 1999

Francesco Musotto (1 February 1947 – 20 August 2025) was an Italian politician who was a Member of the European Parliament for the Islands, elected for the first time in 1999. He was the son of Giovanni Musotto, a notable professor in criminal law at the University of Palermo and member of Italian Socialist Party (Italian: Partito Socialista Italiano, PSI).

Francesco Musotto, a member of the PSI like his father, was with Forza Italia (part of the European People's Party), sat on the European Parliament's Committee on Regional Development, was a substitute for the Committee on Fisheries, and of the Committee on Transport and Tourism. He was President of the Province of Palermo from 1994 to 1995 and from 1998 to 2008.

== Life and career ==
Musotto was born in Palermo on 1 February 1947. He graduated in law in 1969, worked as a lawyer from 1974, and as a farmer from 1996. Musotto earned a second diploma in agriculture in 1998.

Between 1972 and 1975, he served as Municipal Councillor for Cefalù, and was president of the Province of Palermo from 1998. He was a member of the Sicilian Regional Assembly in 1983–1986.

On 20 August 2025, it was announced that Musotto had died in Palermo at the age of 78.

== See also ==
- 2004 European Parliament election in Italy

== Sources ==
- Jamieson, Alison (2000). The Antimafia: Italy’s fight against organized crime, London: Macmillan, ISBN 0-333-80158-X
