= Ernesto Di Fresco =

Italian politician and businessman (1929–2002)

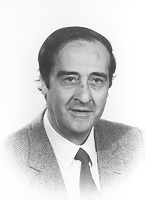

Member of the Chamber of Deputies
- In office 16 March 1983 – 11 July 1983

President of the Province of Palermo
- In office 29 July 1975 – 10 November 1976
- Preceded by: Giovanni Celauro
- Succeeded by: Gaspare Giganti
- In office 16 April 1981 – 24 November 1982
- Preceded by: Francesco Bombace
- Succeeded by: Francesco Candioto

Personal details
- Born: 28 January 1929 Palermo, Kingdom of Italy
- Died: 16 November 2002 (aged 73) Palermo, Italy
- Party: Christian Democracy
- Occupation: Businessman

Ernesto Di Fresco (28 January 1929 – 16 November 2002) was an Italian businessman and politician. A member of Christian Democracy, he served twice as president of the Province of Palermo and briefly as a member of the Chamber of Deputies during the 8th Legislature.
