= Amalia Sartori =

Italian politician

Amalia Sartori MEP
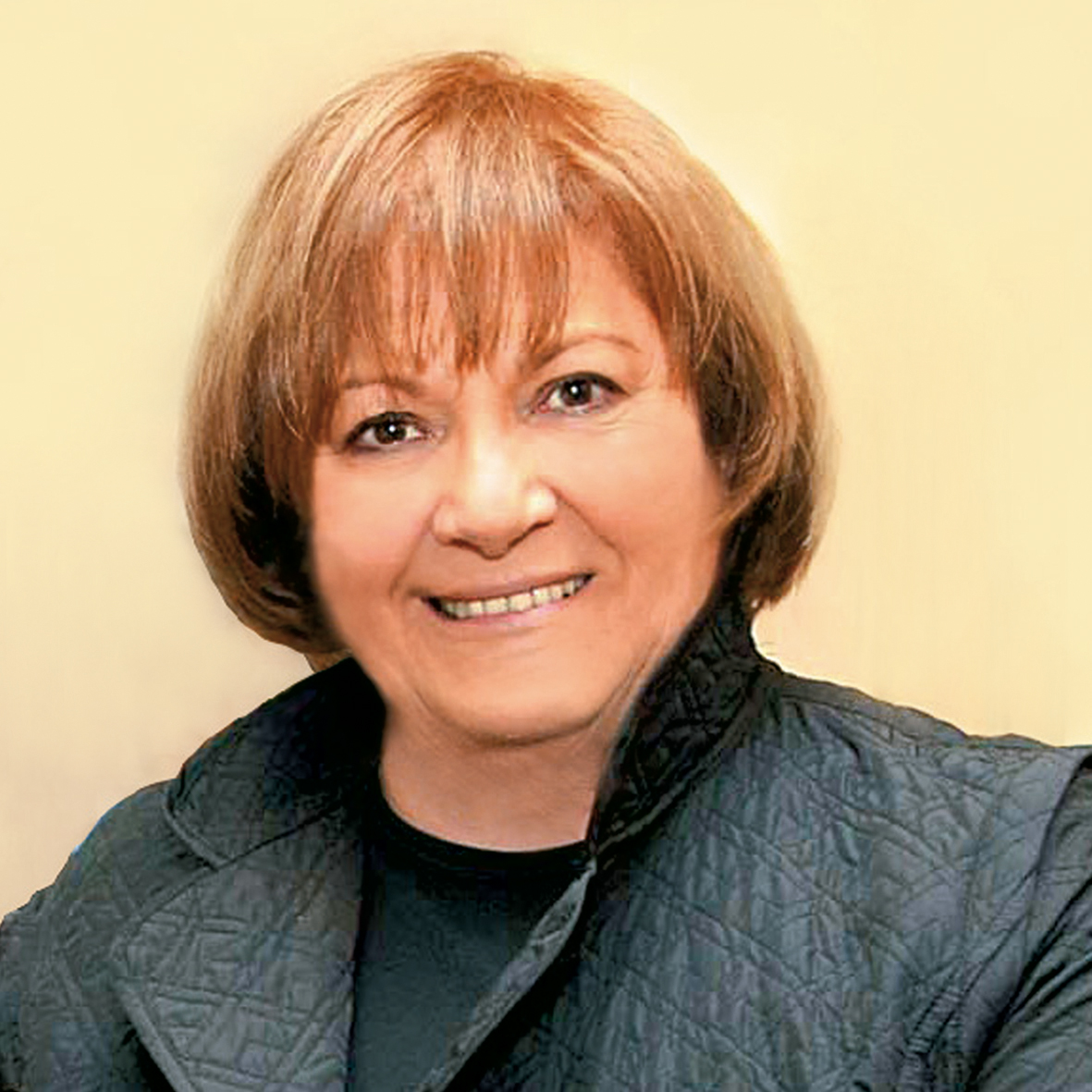

Member of the European Parliament
- In office June 14, 1999 – June 30, 2014
- Constituency: North-East

Personal details
- Born: 2 August 1947 (age 78) Valdastico, Italy
- Party: Forza Italia

Amalia Sartori (born 2 August 1947 in Valdastico) is an Italian politician.

== Education ==
- Graduate in literature

== Career ==
- 1971-1985: Teacher
- 1985-1990: Member of the Regional Executive of the Veneto with responsibility for roads and transport
- 1986-1987: Chairman of the international airport of Venice
- 1988-1989: Chairman of the Veneto, Emilia Romagna and Piemonte inter-regional board for the management of the Po river - Veneto water-ways system
- 1990-1992: Vice-chairman of the Regional Executive of the Veneto (Giunta Regionale)
- 1995-2000: Chairman of the Regional Council
- Drew up the first Regional Transport Plan for the Veneto, the 'Snow Plan' and the Plan for tourist ports
- Launched the special Plan for 'black spots' and important safety campaigns
- Has been responsible for major institutional initiatives upholding the interests of women in the institutional, family and social spheres
- 1999-2014: Member of the European Parliament

== See also ==
- 2004 European Parliament election in Italy
- Sartori of Vicenza
