= The Italian Socialists =

The Italian Socialists I Socialisti Italiani
- Leader: Bobo Craxi, Saverio Zavettieri
- Founded: 7 February 2006
- Dissolved: 10 October 2009
- Split from: New Italian Socialist Party
- Succeeded by: United Socialists
- Membership (2006): 18,700
- Ideology: Social democracy
- Political position: Centre-left

The Italian Socialists (I Socialisti Italiani) was a minor social-democratic political party in Italy.

== History ==
The party was founded on 7 February 2006 as the result of a split from the New Italian Socialist Party (NPSI) by the wing favourable to a political alliance with The Union on the centre-left, and an immediate discontinuance of ties with the centre-right House of Freedoms. The party was originally led by Bobo Craxi, son of the late Bettino Craxi, former leader of the Italian Socialist Party and former Prime Minister of Italy.

In the 2006 general election the party was part of The Union coalition, being present only in few constituencies and thus gaining only 0.3% of the vote for the Chamber of Deputies and 0.4% for the Senate. The party saw none of its members elected and even Craxi, who had a place on The Olive Tree electoral list, was not elected, leaving the party without representation in Parliament. However, the centre-left coalition won the election and Craxi was appointed Under-Secretary of Foreign Affairs in the Prodi II Cabinet.

The first party convention, held on 10–11 March 2007, elected unanimously Saverio Zavettieri as party secretary and deliberated the change in name from The Socialists (I Socialisti) to The Italian Socialists. The party also discussed and rejected the opportunity to join the Democratic Party.

In July 2007, the party decided to merge into the modern-day Italian Socialist Party (PSI), which was launched on 5 October 2007, but, in July 2008, Zavettieri left that party and re-organised The Italian Socialists. In October 2009 also Craxi left the PSI, paving the way for a new party with Zavettieri into which The Italian Socialists were finally merged, the United Socialists.
