= Red Army of Turin =

The Red Army of Turin was a socialist paramilitary organisation set up in September 1919. Its role was to offer military defence to socialist organisations and meetings. One of its first engagements was on 24 September 1919 when it returned gunfire after police and soldiers opened fire on a banned open air demonstration organised by the Socialist Party of Turin against the seizure of Fiume by Italian nationalists led by Gabriele d'Annunzio.
