= Italian Socialist Party =

Political party that existed in Italy from 1892 to 1994

Italian Socialist Party Partito Socialista Italiano
- Logo of the Italian Socialist Party from 1978 to 1987, with the classic hammer and sickle and the modern carnation symbolism
- Abbreviation: PSI
- Secretary: Pietro Nenni (first); Ottaviano Del Turco (last)
- Founders: Filippo Turati; Andrea Costa; Anna Kuliscioff
- Founded: 14 August 1892
- Legalised: 24 April 1944 (previously banned from 6 November 1926)
- Dissolved: 13 November 1994
- Merger of: Italian Workers' Party; Italian Revolutionary Socialist Party
- Split from: Historical Far Left
- Succeeded by: Italian Socialists
- Newspaper: Avanti!
- Youth wing: Italian Socialist Youth Federation
- Paramilitary wing: Red Guards (1919–1922)
- Membership (1991): 674,057
- Ideology: Social democracy; Democratic socialism
- Political position: Centre-left to left-wing
- National affiliation: National Liberation Committee (1943–1947); Popular Democratic Front (1947–1948); Organic centre-left (1962–1976); Unified Socialist Party (1966–1968); Pentapartito (1980–1991); Quadripartito (1991–1994); Alliance of Progressives (1994)
- Regional affiliation: PSOM (historical)
- European affiliation: Party of European Socialists
- European Parliament group: Party of European Socialists
- International affiliation: Second International (1892–1914); Communist International (1919-1921); 2½ International (1922–1923); Labour and Socialist International (1930–1940); Socialist International (1969–1994)
- Colours: Red

The Italian Socialist Party (Italian: Partito Socialista Italiano, PSI) was a social democratic and democratic socialist political party in Italy, whose history stretched for longer than a century, making it one of the longest-surviving parties of the country. Founded in Genoa in 1892, the PSI was from the beginning a big tent of Italy's political left and socialism, ranging from the revolutionary socialism of Andrea Costa to the Marxist-inspired reformist socialism of Filippo Turati and the anarchism of Anna Kuliscioff. Under Turati's leadership, the party was a frequent ally of the Italian Republican Party and the Italian Radical Party at the parliamentary level, while later it entered into dialogue with the remnants of the Historical Left and the Liberal Union during Giovanni Giolitti's governments to ensure representation for the labour movement and the working class. In the 1900s and 1910s, the PSI achieved significant electoral success, becoming Italy's first party in 1919 and during the country's Biennio Rosso in 1921, when it was the target of violent paramilitary activities from the far right, and was not able to move the country in the revolutionary direction it wanted.

A split with what became known as the Communist Party of Italy and the rise to power of former party member and Italian fascist leader Benito Mussolini, who was expelled from the party, class struggle and internationalism in favour of corporatism and ultranationalism, and his National Fascist Party led to the PSI's collapse in the controversial 1924 Italian general election and eventual ban in 1925. This forced the party and its remaining leaders underground or in exile. The PSI dominated the Italian left until after World War II, when it was eclipsed in status by the Italian Communist Party (PCI). The two parties formed an alliance lasting until 1956 and governed together at the local level, particularly in some big cities and the so-called red regions until the 1990s. The PSI suffered the right-wing split of the Italian Democratic Socialist Party, whose members opposed the alliance with the PCI and favoured joining the Centrism coalition, in 1947 and the left-wing split of the Italian Socialist Party of Proletarian Unity, whose members wanted to continue the cooperation with the PCI, in 1964. Starting from the 1960s, the PSI frequently participated in coalition governments led by Christian Democracy, from the Organic centre-left to the Pentapartito in the 1980s.

The PSI, which always remained the country's third-largest party, came to special prominence in the 1980s when its leader Bettino Craxi served as Prime Minister of Italy from 1983 to 1987. Under Craxi, the PSI severed the residual ties with Marxism and dropped the hammer and sickle in favour of a carnation, a symbol popularly associated with democratic socialism and social democracy, which the party was by then fully embracing, and re-branded it as liberal-socialist—some observers compared this to the Third Way developments of social democracy and described these events as being twenty years ahead of New Labour in the United Kingdom. By that time, the party was aligned with European social democracy and like-minded reformist socialist parties and leaders, including François Mitterrand, Felipe González, Andreas Papandreou and Mário Soares, and was one of the main representatives of Mediterranean or South European socialism. During this period, Italy underwent il sorpasso and became the world's sixth largest economy but also saw a rise of its public debt. While associated with neoliberal policies, as the post-war consensus around social democracy was on the defensive amid the crisis of the 1970s, others argue that the PSI and Craxi, along with the DC's left-wing when they governed, maintained dirigisme in contrast to the neoliberal and privatisation trends.

The PSI was disbanded in 1994 as a result of the Tangentopoli scandals. A series of legal successors followed, including the Italian Socialists (1994–1998), the Italian Democratic Socialists (1998–2007) and the Socialist Party (formed in 2007, it took the PSI name in October 2009) within the centre-left coalition, and a string of minor parties and the New Italian Socialist Party (formed in 2001) within the centre-right coalition. These parties have never reached the popularity of the old PSI. Former PSI leading members and voters have joined quite different parties, from the centre-right, such as Forza Italia, The People of Freedom and the new Forza Italia, to the centre-left, such as the Democratic Party.

== History ==
=== Early years ===
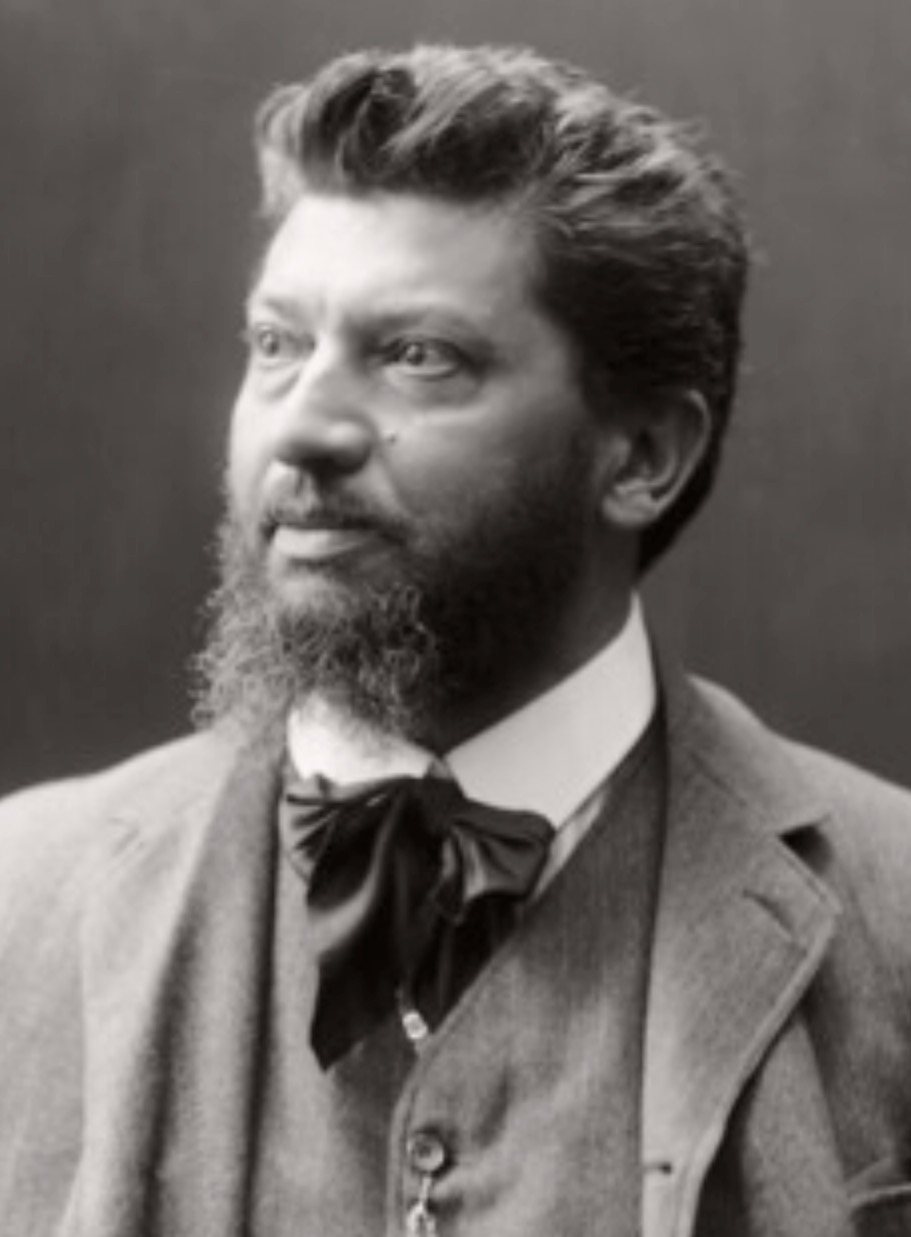
Filippo Turati was one of the founders of the party.

The PSI was founded on 14 August 1892 as the Party of Italian Workers (Partito dei Lavoratori Italiani) by delegates of several workers' associations and parties, notably including the Italian Workers' Party and the Milanese Socialist League. It was part of a wave of new socialist parties at the end of the 19th century and had to endure persecution by the Italian government during its early years. It modelled on the Social Democratic Party of Germany. While in Sicily the Fasci Siciliani were spreading as a popular movement of democratic and socialist inspiration, the party celebrated its second congress in Reggio Emilia on 8 September 1893 and changed its name to the Socialist Party of Italian Workers (Partito Socialista dei Lavoratori Italiani). During the third congress on 13 January 1895 in Parma, it decided to adopt the name of Italian Socialist Party and Filippo Turati was elected its secretary.

At the start of the 20th century, the PSI chose not to strongly oppose the governments led by five-time prime minister Giovanni Giolitti. This conciliation with the existing governments and its improving electoral fortunes helped to establish the PSI as a mainstream Italian political party by the 1910s. Despite the party's improving electoral results, the PSI remained divided into two major branches, the Reformists and the Maximalists. The Reformists, led by Filippo Turati, were strong mostly in the unions and the parliamentary group. The Maximalists, led by Costantino Lazzari, were affiliated with the London Bureau of socialist groups, an international association of left-wing socialist parties. In 1912, the Maximalists led by Benito Mussolini prevailed at the party convention, which led to the split of the Italian Reformist Socialist Party. In 1914, the party obtained good success in local elections, especially in the industrialised northern Italy, and Mussolini became leader of the City Council of Milan. During the First World War, Italian Socialists found themselves in positions enabling them to influence economic and social legislation. From 1912 to 1914, Mussolini headed up the pro-Bolshevik wing of the PSI who purged moderate or reformist socialists.

=== Rise of fascism ===
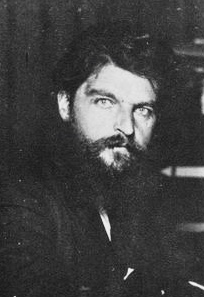
Nicola Bombacci was secretary of the PSI and leader of its revolutionary wing, who led the party to its best result ever in 1919.

World War I tore the party apart. The orthodox socialists were challenged by advocates of national syndicalism, who called for revolutionary war to liberate Italian-speaking territories from authoritarian Austrian Empire control and force the government by threat of violence to create a corporatist state. The national syndicalists intended to support Italian republicans in overthrowing the monarchy if such reforms were not made and if Italy did not enter the war together with the Allied Powers and their struggle against the Central Empires, seen as the final fight for the worldwide triumph of freedom and democracy. The dominant internationalist and pacifist wing of the party remained committed to avoiding what it called a bourgeois war. The PSI's refusal to support the war led to its national syndicalist faction either leaving or being purged from the party, such as Mussolini who had begun to show sympathy to the national syndicalist cause. A number of the national syndicalists expelled from the PSI later joined Mussolini's Italian fascist revolutionary movement in 1914, including the Fasces of Revolutionary Action in 1915 (later Italian Fasces of Combat). During the Third Fascist Congress in late 1921, Mussolini turned the Fasces of Combat into the National Fascist Party.

After the Russian Revolution of 1917, the PSI quickly aligned itself in support of the Bolshevik movement in Russia and supported its call for the overthrow of the bourgeoisie. In its party congress held in Bologna, the party voted to join the Communist International, becoming the first party outside of the former Russian Empire to do so. In the 1919 Italian general election, the PSI, led by Nicola Bombacci, reached its highest result ever: 32.0% and 156 seats in the country's Chamber of Deputies. From 1919 to the 1920s, Socialists and Fascists emerged as prominent rival movements in Italy's urban centres, often resorting to political violence in their clashes. In 1919, the Socialist Party of Turin formed the Red Army of Turin, which was accompanied by a proposal to organise a national confederation of Red Scouts and Cyclists. At the 1921 Livorno Congress, the party was expelled from the Comintern after its left-wing broke away in 1921 to form the Communist Party of Italy (PCd'I), a division from which the PSI never recovered and that had enormous consequences on Italian politics. In 1922, another split occurred when the reformist wing of the party, headed by Turati and Giacomo Matteotti, was expelled and formed the Unitary Socialist Party (PSU).

Matteotti was assassinated by Fascists in 1924 and shortly afterwards a Fascist one-party dictatorship was established in Italy. The PSI and all other political parties except the Fascist party were banned in 1926. The party's leadership remained in exile during the Fascist years; in 1930, the PSU was re-integrated into the PSI. The party was a member of the Labour and Socialist International between 1930 and 1940.

=== Post-World War II ===
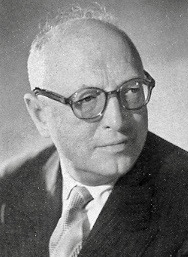
Pietro Nenni was a historical leader of the PSI.

In the 1946 Italian general election, the first after World War II, the PSI obtained 20.7% of the vote, narrowly ahead of the Italian Communist Party (PCI) that gained 18.9%. In the 1948 Italian general election, the United States secretly convinced Britain's Labour Party to pressure Socialists to end all coalitions with Communists, which fostered a split in PSI. Socialists led by Pietro Nenni chose to take part in the Popular Democratic Front along with the PCI, while Giuseppe Saragat launched the Italian Workers' Socialist Party. The PSI was weakened by the split and was far less organised than the PCI, so Communist candidates were far more competitive. As a result, the PSI parliamentary delegation was cut by a half. Nonetheless, the PSI continued its alliance with the PCI until 1956, when the Soviet repression of the Hungarian Revolution of 1956 caused a major split between the two parties.

Between 1947 and throughout the 1950s, the national political office of the young socialists was rebuilt, including Dario Valori, Giorgio Ruffolo, Vincenzo Balsamo, Emo Egoli, Erasmo Boiardi, and Giacomo Princigalli many of whom were trained by Rodolfo Morandi.

Starting from 1963, Socialists participated in the Organic centre-left governments in alliance with Christian Democracy (DC), the Italian Democratic Socialist Party (PSDI) and the Italian Republican Party (PRI). These governments acceded to many of the demands of the PSI for social reform and laid the foundations for Italy's modern welfare state.

In 1964, the internal left wing left the party in opposition to both the plan to form a government with the Christian Democrats and the plan to reunify with Saragat's Social Democratic Party. The splinter group thus founded the PSIUP, led by prominent figures in Italian socialism: Tullio Vecchietti, Vittorio Foa, Lelio Basso, Emilio Lussu, Lucio Libertini and Lucio Mario Luzzatto, followed by young leaders and officials such as Giuseppe Pupillo, Roberto Speciale, Dario Valori, Giacomo Princigalli, Andrea Margheri, Giorgio Gabanizza, Vincenzo Balsamo and even higher, who will all be part of the central committee of the new party.

During the 1960s and 1970s, the PSI lost much of its influence despite actively participating in the government. The PCI gradually outnumbered it as the dominant political force in the Italian left. The PSI tried to enlarge its base by joining forces with the PSDI under the name Unified Socialist Party (PSU). After a disappointing loss in the 1968 Italian general election in which the PSU gained far fewer seats in total than each of the two parties had obtained separately in 1963, it disbanded. The 1972 Italian general election underlined the PSI's precipitate decline as the party received less than 10% of the vote compared to 14.2% in 1958, when Nenni assumed the leadership of the autonomist faction.

=== Bettino Craxi ===
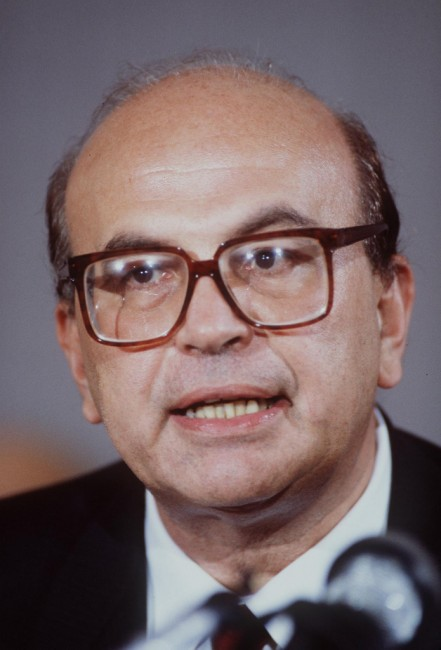
Bettino Craxi

In 1976, Bettino Craxi was elected new secretary of the party. From the beginning, Craxi tried to undermine the PCI, which until then had been continuously increasing its votes in elections and to consolidate the PSI as a modern, strongly pro-European reformist party, with deep roots in the democratic left-wing, and a left-wing alternative to the Historic Compromise between DC and PCI. This strategy called for ending most of the party's historical traditions as a working-class trade union based party and attempting to gain new support among white-collar and public sector employees. At the same time, the PSI increased its presence in the big state-owned enterprises and became heavily involved in corruption and illegal party funding, which would eventually result in the mani pulite investigations.

Even if the PSI never became a serious electoral challenger either to the PCI or the DC, its pivotal position in the political arena allowed it to claim the post of prime minister for Craxi after the 1983 Italian general election. The electoral support for DC was significantly weakened, leaving it with 32.9% of the vote, compared to the 38.3% it gained in 1979. The PSI that had obtained only 11% threatened to leave the parliamentary majority unless Craxi was made prime minister. Christian Democrats accepted this compromise to avoid a new election. Craxi became the first Socialist in the history of the Italian Republic to be appointed prime minister.

Unlike many of its predecessors, Craxi's government proved to be durable, lasting three and a half years from 1983 to 1987. During those years, the PSI gained popularity as Craxi successfully boosted the country's GNP and controlled inflation. He demonstrated Italy's independence and nationalism in the clash with the United States during the Sigonella incident. Moreover, Craxi spoke of many reforms, including the transformation of the Constitution of Italy toward a presidential system. The PSI looked like the driving force behind the bulk of reforms initiated by the Pentapartito coalition. Craxi lost his post in March 1987 due to a conflict with the other parties of the coalition over the proposed budget for 1987.

In the 1987 Italian general election, the PSI won 14.3% of the vote and this time it was Christian Democrats' turn to govern. From 1987 to 1992, the PSI participated in four governments, allowing Giulio Andreotti to take power in 1989 and to govern until 1992. Socialists held a strong balance of power, which made them more powerful than Christian Democrats, who had to depend on it to form a majority in Parliament. The PSI kept tight control of this advantage. The alternative that Craxi had wanted so much was taking shape, namely the idea of a Socialist Unity with the other left-wing political parties, including the PCI, proposed by Craxi in 1989. He believed that the Fall of Communism in eastern Europe had undermined the PCI and made Socialist Unity inevitable. In fact, the PSI was in line to become the Italy's second largest party and to become the dominant force of a new left-wing coalition opposed to a Christian Democrat-led one; this did not actually happen because of the rise of Lega Nord and the Tangentopoli scandals.

=== Decline ===
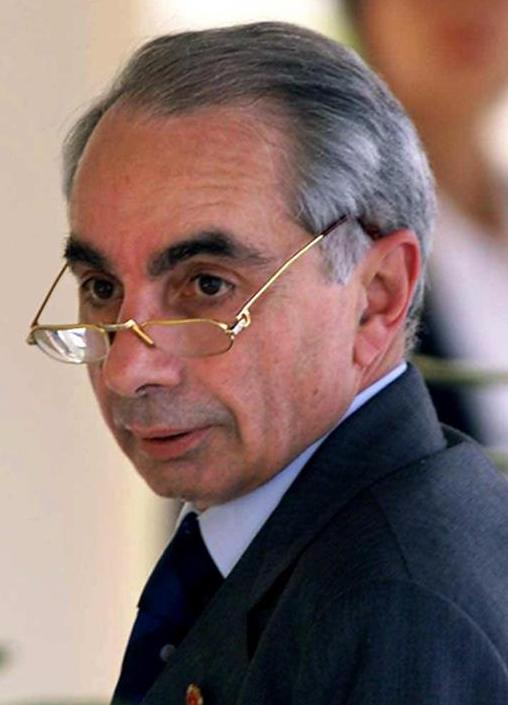
Giuliano Amato was the party's second prime minister of Italy from 1992 to 1993.

In February 1992, Mario Chiesa, a Socialist hospital administrator in Milan, was caught taking a bribe. Craxi denounced Chiesa by calling him an isolated thief, who had nothing to do with the party as a whole. Feeling betrayed, Chiesa confessed his crimes to the police and implicated others, starting a chain reaction of judicial investigations that would ultimately engulf the entire political system. The investigations, named mani pulite ("clean hands") was carried out by three Milanese magistrates among whom Antonio Di Pietro quickly stood out becoming a national hero thanks to his charismatic character and his ability to extract confessions.

The investigations were suspended for four weeks for the 1992 Italian general election to take place in an uninfluenced atmosphere and the PSI managed to garner 13.6% of the vote in spite of the corruption scandals. Many in the party thought the scandal had been brought under control; they failed to realise that investigations would eventually be launched against ministers and party leaders. Furthermore, as early as May 1992, public opinion unconditionally supported the magistrates against a political system that the majority of Italians already distrusted. Craxi himself was under criminal investigation since December 1992. In April 1993, the Italian Parliament denied four times the authorisation for magistrates to continue investigation for Craxi. Italian newspapers shouted scandal and Craxi was besieged at his Rome residence by a crowd of young people, who threw coins at him, shouting "Bettino, do you want these as well?" This scene was to become one of the many symbols of that period.

In 1992–1993, many PSI regional, provincial, and municipal deputies, MPs, mayors and even ministers found themselves overwhelmed with accusations and arrests. At this point, public opinion turned against the PSI and many regional headquarters of the party were besieged by people who wanted an honest party with true socialist values. Between January 1993 and February 1993, Claudio Martelli (former justice minister and deputy prime minister) started to contend for party leadership. Martelli stepped forward as a candidate, emphasising the need to clean the party of corruption and make it electable. Although he had many supporters, Martelli and Craxi were both caught in a scandal dating back to 1982, when the Banco Ambrosiano gave to the two of them around 7 million dollars. Martelli subsequently resigned from the party and from the government. Giuliano Amato, a member of the PSI, resigned as prime minister in April 1993. His government was succeeded by a technocratic government led by Carlo Azeglio Ciampi.

=== Dissolution ===
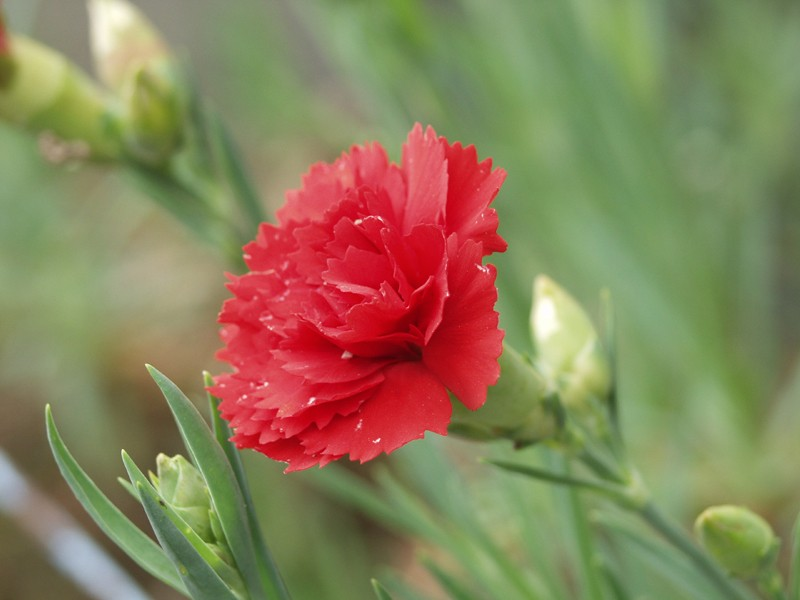
The carnation became the main symbol of the late PSI.

Craxi resigned as party secretary in February 1993. Between 1992 and 1993, most members of the party left politics and three PSI deputies committed suicide. Craxi was succeeded by two Socialist trade-unionists, first Giorgio Benvenuto and then by Ottaviano Del Turco. In the December 1993 provincial and municipal elections, the PSI was virtually wiped out, receiving around 3% of the vote. In Milan, where the PSI had won 20% in 1990, the PSI received a mere 2% and was shut out of the council. Del Turco tried in vain to regain credibility for the party.

By the 1994 Italian general election, the PSI was in a state of near-collapse. Its remains contested the election as part of the Alliance of Progressives dominated by the post-Communist incarnation of the PCI, the Democratic Party of the Left (PDS). Del Turco had quickly changed the party symbol to reinforce the idea of innovation, which did not stop the PSI gaining only 2.2% of the votes compared to 13.6% in 1992. The PSI elected 16 deputies, (Note: They were Giuseppe Albertini, Enrico Boselli, Carlo Carli, Ottaviano Del Turco, Fabio Di Capua, Vittorio Emiliani, Mario Gatto, Luigi Giacco, Gino Giugni, Alberto La Volpe, Vincenzo Mattina, Valerio Mignone, Rosario Olivo, Corrado Paoloni, Giuseppe Pericu, and Valdo Spini.) as well as 14 senators, (Note: They were Paolo Bagnoli, Orietta Baldelli, Francesco Barra, Luigi Biscardi, Guido De Martino, Gianni Fardin, Carlo Gubbini, Maria Rosaria Manieri, Cesare Marini, Maria Antonia Modolo, Michele Sellitti, Giancarlo Tapparo, Antonino Valletta, and Antonio Vozzi.) down from 92 deputies and 49 senators of 1992. Most of them came from the left wing of the party as Del Turco himself did. Most Socialists joined other political forces, mainly Forza Italia, the new party led by Silvio Berlusconi, the Patto Segni, and Democratic Alliance.

The party was disbanded on 13 November 1994 after two years in which almost all of its longtime leaders, especially Craxi, were involved in Tangentopoli and decided to leave politics. The 100-year-old party closed down, partially thanks to its leaders for their personalisation of the PSI.

=== Diaspora ===
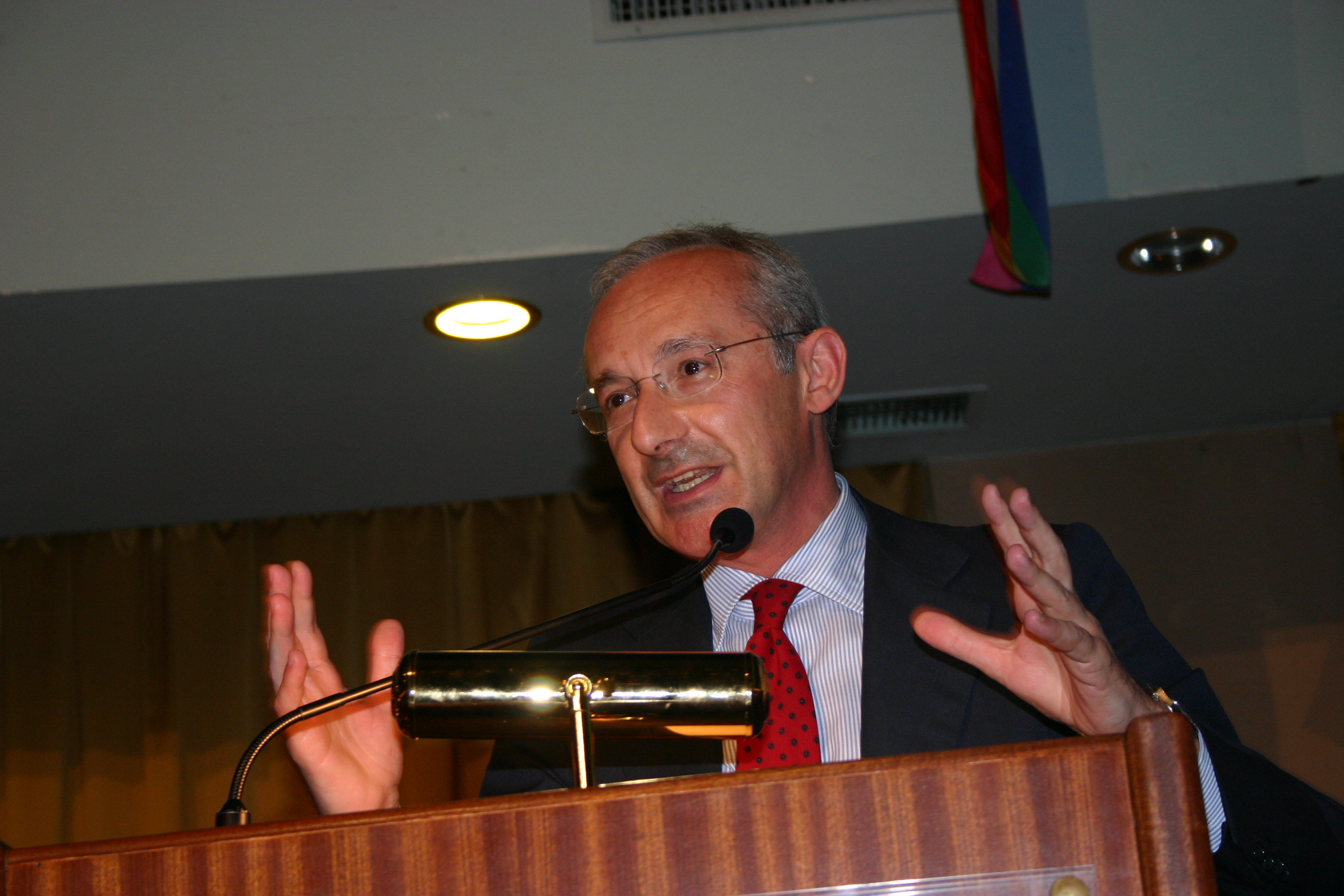
Enrico Boselli tried an unsuccessful renaissance for the PSI and its legal successors.

Socialists who did not align with the other parties organised themselves in two groups: the Italian Socialists (SI) of Enrico Boselli, Ottaviano Del Turco, Roberto Villetti, Riccardo Nencini, Cesare Marini, and Maria Rosaria Manieri, who decided to be autonomous from the PDS; and the Labour Federation (FL) of Valdo Spini, Antonio Ruberti, Giorgio Ruffolo, Giuseppe Pericu, Carlo Carli, and Rosario Olivo, who entered in close alliance with it. The SI eventually merged with other Socialist splinter groups to form the Italian Democratic Socialists (SDI) in 1998, while the FL merged with PDS to form the Democrats of the Left (DS) later on that year.

Between 1994 and 1996, many former Socialists joined Forza Italia (FI), as did Giulio Tremonti, Franco Frattini, Massimo Baldini, and Luigi Cesaro. Gianni De Michelis, Ugo Intini and several politicians close to Craxi formed the Socialist Party, while others like Fabrizio Cicchitto and Enrico Manca launched the Reformist Socialist Party. In the 2000s, two outfits claimed to be the party's successor, namely the Italian Democratic Socialists (SDI) that evolved from the Italian Socialists (SI) and the New Italian Socialist Party (NPSI) founded by Gianni De Michelis, Claudio Martelli, and Bobo Craxi in 2001.

Both the SDI and the NPSI were minor political forces. A number of Socialist members and voters joined FI, while others joined the DS and Democracy is Freedom – The Daisy (DL). Many others were not members of any party any more. (Note: In the Legislature XV of Italy (2006–2008), 70 out of 1060 Italian MPs and MEPs came from the PSI: 38 were affiliated to Forza Italia (Roberto Antonione, Valentina Aprea, Simone Baldelli, Massimo Baldini, Paolo Bonaiuti, Margherita Boniver, Anna Bonfrisco, Renato Brunetta, Francesco Brusco, Giulio Camber, Giampiero Cantoni, Luigi Cesaro, Fabrizio Cicchitto, Ombretta Colli, Francesco Colucci, Stefania Craxi, Gaetano Fasolino, Antonio Gentile, Paolo Guzzanti, Raffaele Iannuzzi, Vanni Lenna, Antonio Leone, Chiara Moroni, Francesco Musotto, Emiddio Novi, Gaetano Pecorella, Marcello Pera, Mauro Pili, Sergio Pizzolante, Guido Podestà, Gaetano Quagliariello, Maurizio Sacconi, Jole Santelli, Amalia Sartori, Aldo Scarabosio, Giorgio Stracquadanio, Renzo Tondo, and Giulio Tremonti), 9 to the Italian Democratic Socialists (Rapisardo Antinucci, Enrico Boselli, Enrico Buemi, Giovanni Crema, Lello Di Gioia, Pia Elda Locatelli, Giacomo Mancini Jr., Angelo Piazza, and Roberto Villetti), 8 to the Democrats of the Left (Giorgio Benvenuto, Antonello Cabras, Carlo Fontana, Beatrice Magnolfi, Gianni Pittella, Valdo Spini, Rosa Villecco, and Sergio Zavoli), 5 to Democracy is Freedom – The Daisy (Laura Fincato, Linda Lanzillotta, Maria Leddi, Pierluigi Mantini, and Tiziano Treu), 4 to the New Italian Socialist Party (Alessandro Battilocchio, Lucio Barani, Mauro Del Bue, and Gianni De Michelis), 2 to the Movement for Autonomy (Pietro Reina and Giuseppe Saro), 1 to Italy of Values (Aurelio Misiti), 1 to the Union of Christian and Centre Democrats (Giuseppe Drago), and 2 non-party members (Giuliano Amato and Giovanni Ricevuto).) Some former Socialists were affiliated to The People of Freedom (PdL) and remains in the 2013 refoundation of FI, while others are in centre-left Democratic Party (PD) and modern-day Socialist Party (PS). (Note: In the Legislature XVI of Italy (2008–2013), 65 out of 1060 Italian MPs and MEPs come from the PSI: 44 were affiliated to The People of Freedom (Roberto Antonione, Valentina Aprea, Simone Baldelli, Massimo Baldini, Lucio Barani, Luca Barbareschi, Paolo Bonaiuti, Anna Bonfrisco, Margherita Boniver, Renato Brunetta, Stefano Caldoro, Giulio Camber, Gianpiero Cantoni, Giuliano Cazzola, Luigi Cesaro, Fabrizio Cicchitto, Ombretta Colli, Francesco Colucci, Stefania Craxi, Diana De Feo, Sergio De Gregorio, Franco Frattini, Antonio Gentile, Lella Golfo, Paolo Guzzanti, Giancarlo Lehner, Antonio Leone, Innocenzo Leontini, Chiara Moroni, Fiamma Nirenstein, Gaetano Pecorella, Marcello Pera, Mauro Pili, Sergio Pizzolante, Guido Podestà, Gaetano Quagliariello, Maurizio Sacconi, Jole Santelli, Giuseppe Saro, Amalia Sartori, Umberto Scapagnini, Aldo Scarabosio, Giorgio Straquadanio, and Giulio Tremonti), 12 to the Democratic Party (Antonello Cabras, Franca Donaggio, Linda Lanzillotta, Maria Leddi, Pierluigi Mantini, Alberto Maritati, Gianni Pittella, Francesco Tempestini, Tiziano Treu, Umberto Veronesi, Rosa Villecco, and Sergio Zavoli), 4 to the Socialist Party (Rapisardo Antonucci, Alessandro Battilocchio, Gianni De Michelis, and Pia Elda Locatelli), 2 to the Movement for Autonomy (Elio Vittorio Belcastro and Luciano Sardelli), 2 to Italy of Values (Francesco Barbato and Aurelio Misiti), and 1 to the Union of Christian and Centre Democrats (Giuseppe Drago).) Socialists who joined FI include Tremonti, Frattini, Fabrizio Cicchitto, Renato Brunetta, Amalia Sartori, Francesco Musotto, Margherita Boniver, Francesco Colucci, Raffaele Iannuzzi, Maurizio Sacconi, Luigi Cesaro, and Stefania Craxi. Although it may seem unusual for self-identified socialists to be members of a centre-right party, many of those who did so felt that the centre-left was by now dominated by former Communists and the best way to fight for mainstream social democracy was through FI/PdL. Valdo Spini, Giorgio Benvenuto, Gianni Pittella and Guglielmo Epifani joined the DS, while Enrico Manca, Tiziano Treu, Laura Fincato, and Linda Lanzillotta joined DL. Giuliano Amato joined The Olive Tree as an independent.

In 2007, some former Socialists, including the SDI, a portion of the NPSI led by Gianni De Michelis, The Italian Socialists of Bobo Craxi, Socialism is Freedom of Rino Formica and splinters from the DS joined forces and formed the Socialist Party (PS), renamed Italian Socialist Party (PSI) in 2011. This PSI is the only Italian party represented in Parliament that explicitly refers to itself as Socialist; many other Socialist associations and organisation participate to the political debate both in the centre-right and the centre-left coalitions.

== Ideology ==
During its century-long history, the party's socialism evolved from its revolutionary socialist beginnings, with the Reformist faction in minority, to parliamentary and reformist socialism, democratic socialism, and social democracy. While its more radical factions split to form the Italian Communist Party (PCI) in 1921, the party's left-wing, heir of the Maximalist faction, remained strong at least until the 1980s, when the PSI under Bettino Craxi was rebranded as liberal socialist. At its beginnings, the PSI sat to the farthest left of the Italian party system with the heirs of the Historical Far Left. As many of its positions became accepted or mainstream, the party came to represent the centre-left, positioned between the PCI and Christian Democracy, and was part of Italy's first centre-left government in the 1960s; its inclusion led those governments to be called the Organic centre-left.

== Popular support ==
When Socialists came out in the late 1890s, they were present only in rural Emilia-Romagna and southern Lombardy, where they won their first seats of the Chamber of Deputies; they soon enlarged their base in other areas of the country, especially the urban areas around Turin, Milan, Genoa, and to some extent Naples, densely populated by industrial workers. In the 1900 Italian general election, the party won 5.0% of the vote and 33 seats, its best result so far. Emilia-Romagna was confirmed as the Socialist heartland (20.2% and 13 seats), and the party also did well in Lombardy and Piedmont.

By the end of the 1910s, Socialists had broadened their organisation to all the regions of Italy but were stronger in Northern Italy, where they emerged earlier and where they had their constituency. In the 1919 Italian general election, thanks to the electoral reforms of the previous decade and especially the introduction of proportional representation in place of the old first-past-the-post system, they had their best result ever: 32.0% and 156 seats. The PSI was at the time the representative of both the rural workers of Emilia-Romagna, Tuscany and north-western Piedmont and the industrial workers of Turin, Milan, Venice, Bologna, and Florence. In 1919, the party won 49.7% in Piedmont (over 60% in Novara), 45.9% in Lombardy (over 60% in Mantua and Pavia), 60.0% in Emilia-Romagna (over 70% around Bologna and Ferrara), 41.7% in Tuscany, and 46.5% in Umbria.

In the 1921 Italian general election and after the split of the Communist Party of Italy, the PSI was reduced to 24.5% and was particularly damaged in Piedmont and Tuscany, where Communists got more than 10% of the vote. During the Italian Resistance, which was fought mostly in Piedmont, Emilia-Romagna, and Central Italy, Communists were able to take roots and organise people much better than Socialists so that at the end of World War II the balance between the two parties was completely changed. In the 1946 Italian general election, the PSI was narrowly ahead of Communists (20.7% over 18.7%) but was no longer the dominant party in Emilia-Romagna and Tuscany.

In the 1948 Italian general election, Socialists took part to the Popular Democratic Front with the Italian Communist Party (PCI) but lost almost half of their seats in the Chamber of Deputies due to the better get-out-the-vote machine of Communists and the split of the social democratic faction from the party, the Italian Workers' Socialist Party (7.1%, with peaks over 10% in the Socialist strongholds of the North). In the 1953 Italian general election, the PSI was reduced to 12.7% of the vote and to its heartlands above the Po River, having gained more votes than Communists only narrowly in Lombardy and Veneto. The margin between the two parties would have become larger and larger until its peak in the 1976 Italian general election, when the PCI won 34.4% of the vote and the PSI stopped at 9.6%. At that time, Communists had almost five times the vote of Socialists in the PSI's ancient heartlands of rural Emilia-Romagna and Tuscany, and three times in the Northern regions, where the PSI had some local strongholds left such as in north-eastern Piedmont, north-western and southern Lombardy, north-eastern Veneto, and Friuli-Venezia Giulia, where it gained steadily 12–20% of the vote.

Under the leadership of Bettino Craxi in the 1980s, the PSI had a substantial increase in term of votes. The party strengthened its position in Lombardy, north-eastern Veneto and Friuli-Venezia Giulia, and broadened its power base to Southern Italy, as all the other parties of Pentapartito coalition (Christian Democracy, Italian Republican Party, Italian Democratic Socialist Party, and the Italian Liberal Party) were experiencing. In the 1987 Italian general election, the PSI gained 14.3% of the vote, which was below expectations after four years of government led by Craxi. Alongside the high shares of vote in north-western Lombardy and the North-East (both around 18–20%), the PSI did fairly well in Campania (14.9%), Apulia (15.3%), Calabria (16.9%), and Sicily (14.9%). In the 1992 Italian general election, this trend toward the South was even more evident, and is also reflected in the PSI's main successors, the Italian Socialists, the Italian Democratic Socialists, the New Italian Socialist Party, and the modern-day Italian Socialist Party, all of which had always been stronger in those Southern regions. While Socialists, like Communists and Christian Democrats, had lost votes to Lega Nord, especially in Lombardy, they gained in the South, reaching 19.6% of the vote in Campania, 17.8% in Apulia, and 17.2% in Calabria.

- Kingdom of Italy
- Italian Republic

The electoral results of the PSI in general (Chamber of Deputies) and European Parliament elections since 1895 are shown in the chart above.

== Electoral results ==
=== Italian Parliament ===
Election	Leader	Chamber of Deputies					Senate of the Republic				
Election	Leader	Votes	%	Seats	+/–	Position	Votes	%	Seats	+/–	Position
1895	Andrea Costa	82,523	6.8	15 / 508	▲15	▲4th	No election				
1897	Filippo Turati	82,536	3.0	15 / 508	0	▼5th	No election				
1900	Filippo Turati	164,946	13.0	33 / 508	▲17	▲3rd	No election				
1904	Filippo Turati	326,016	21.3	29 / 508	▼4	▲2nd	No election				
1909	Filippo Turati	347,615	19.0	41 / 508	▲12	2nd	No election				
1913	Costantino Lazzari	883,409	17.6	52 / 508	▲11	2nd	No election				
1919	Nicola Bombacci	1,834,792	32.3	156 / 508	▲104	▲1st	No election				
1921	Giovanni Bacci	1,631,435	24.7	123 / 535	▼33	1st	No election				
1924	Tito Oro Nobili	360,694	5.0	22 / 535	▼101	▼4th	No election				
1929	Angelica Balabanoff	Banned		0 / 400	▼22	–	No election				
1934	Pietro Nenni	Banned		0 / 400	0	–	No election				
1946	Pietro Nenni	4,758,129	20.7	115 / 556	▲115	▲2nd	No election				
1948	Pietro Nenni	8,136,637 (Note: Into the Popular Democratic Front)	31.0	53 / 574	▼62	2nd	6,969,122	30.8	41 / 237	▲41	▲2nd
1953	Pietro Nenni	3,441,014	12.7	75 / 590	▲22	▼3rd	2,891,605	11.9	26 / 237	▼15	▼3rd
1958	Pietro Nenni	4,206,726	14.2	84 / 596	▲9	3rd	3,682,945	14.1	36 / 246	▲10	3rd
1963	Pietro Nenni	4,255,836	13.8	83 / 630	▼1	3rd	3,849,495	14.0	44 / 315	▲8	3rd
1968	Francesco De Martino	4,605,832 (Note: Into the Unified PSI–PSDI)	14.5	62 / 630	▼21	3rd	4,354,906	15.2	36 / 315	▼8	3rd
1972	Francesco De Martino	3,210,427	10.0	61 / 630	▼1	3rd	3,225,707	10.7	33 / 315	▼3	3rd
1976	Francesco De Martino	3,542,998	9.6	57 / 630	▼4	3rd	3,208,164	10.2	30 / 315	▼3	3rd
1979	Bettino Craxi	3,630,052	9.9	62 / 630	▲5	3rd	3,252,410	10.4	32 / 315	▲2	3rd
1983	Bettino Craxi	4,223,362	11.4	73 / 630	▲11	3rd	3,539,593	11.4	38 / 315	▲6	3rd
1987	Bettino Craxi	5,505,690	14.3	94 / 630	▲21	3rd	3,535,457	10.9	43 / 315	▲5	3rd
1992	Bettino Craxi	5,343,808	13.6	92 / 630	▼2	3rd	4,523,873	13.6	49 / 315	▲6	3rd
1994	Ottaviano Del Turco	849,429	2.2	15 / 630	▼77	▼10th	103,490	0.3	9 / 315	▼40	▼11th

=== European Parliament ===
Election	Leader	Votes	%	Seats	+/–	Position	EP Group
1979	Bettino Craxi	3,866,946	11.0	9 / 81	▲9	▲3rd	SOC
1984	Bettino Craxi	3,940,445	11.2	9 / 81	0	3rd	SOC
1989	Bettino Craxi	5,151,929	14.8	12 / 81	▲3	3rd	SOC
1994	Ottaviano Del Turco	606,538	1.8	2 / 87	▼10	▼10th	PES

=== Regional elections ===
Regions of Italy
Election year	Votes	%	Seats	+/−	Leader
1970	2,837,451 (3rd)	10.4	67 / 720	–	Francesco De Martino
1975	3,631,912 (3rd)	12.0	82 / 720	▲15	Francesco De Martino
1980	3,851,722 (3rd)	12.7	86 / 720	▲4	Bettino Craxi
1985	4,267,959 (3rd)	13.3	94 / 720	▲8	Bettino Craxi
1990	4,884,179 (3rd)	15.3	113 / 720	▲19	Bettino Craxi

== Leadership ==
- Secretary: Pompeo Ciotti (1909–1912), Constantino Lazzari (1912–1919), Nicola Bombacci (1919–1920), Egidio Gennari (1920–1921), Giovanni Bacci (1921), Domenico Fioritto (1921–1923), Tito Oro Nobili (1923–1925), Olindo Vernocchi (1925–1926), Ugo Coccia (1926–1928) Angelica Balabanoff (1928–1930), Pietro Nenni (1930), Ugo Coccia (1930–1932), Pietro Nenni (1932–1945), Sandro Pertini (1945–1946), Ivan Matteo Lombardo (1946–1947), Lelio Basso (1947–1948), Alberto Jacometti (1948–1949), Pietro Nenni (1949–1963), Francesco De Martino (1963–1968), Mauro Ferri (1968–1969), Francesco De Martino (1969–1970), Giacomo Mancini (1970–1972), Francesco De Martino (1972–1976), Bettino Craxi (1976–1993), Giorgio Benvenuto (1993), Ottaviano Del Turco (1993–1994)
- Party Leader in the Chamber of Deputies: Paolo De Michelis (1946–1947), Pietro Nenni (1947–1964), Mauro Ferri (1964–1968), Flavio Orlandi (1968–1969), Antonio Giolitti (1969–1970), Luigi Bertoldi (1970–1973), Luigi Mariotti (1973–1976), Bettino Craxi (1976), Vincenzo Balzamo (1976–1980), Silvano Labriola (1980–1983), Rino Formica (1983–1986), Lelio Lagorio (1986–1987), Gianni De Michelis (1987–1988), Nicola Capria (1988–1991), Salvo Andò (1991–1992), Giuseppe La Ganga (1992–1993), Nicola Capria (1993–1994)

== Symbols ==
The PSI was rather unusual among mainstream socialist parties in Europe in using the hammer and sickle as its symbol. In the early 1970s, this prevented it from obtaining the right to use the fist and rose created by France's Socialist Party and shared with several other European parties; it was used in Italy by the Radical Party, although it was ideologically different.

1919–1921

1921–1943

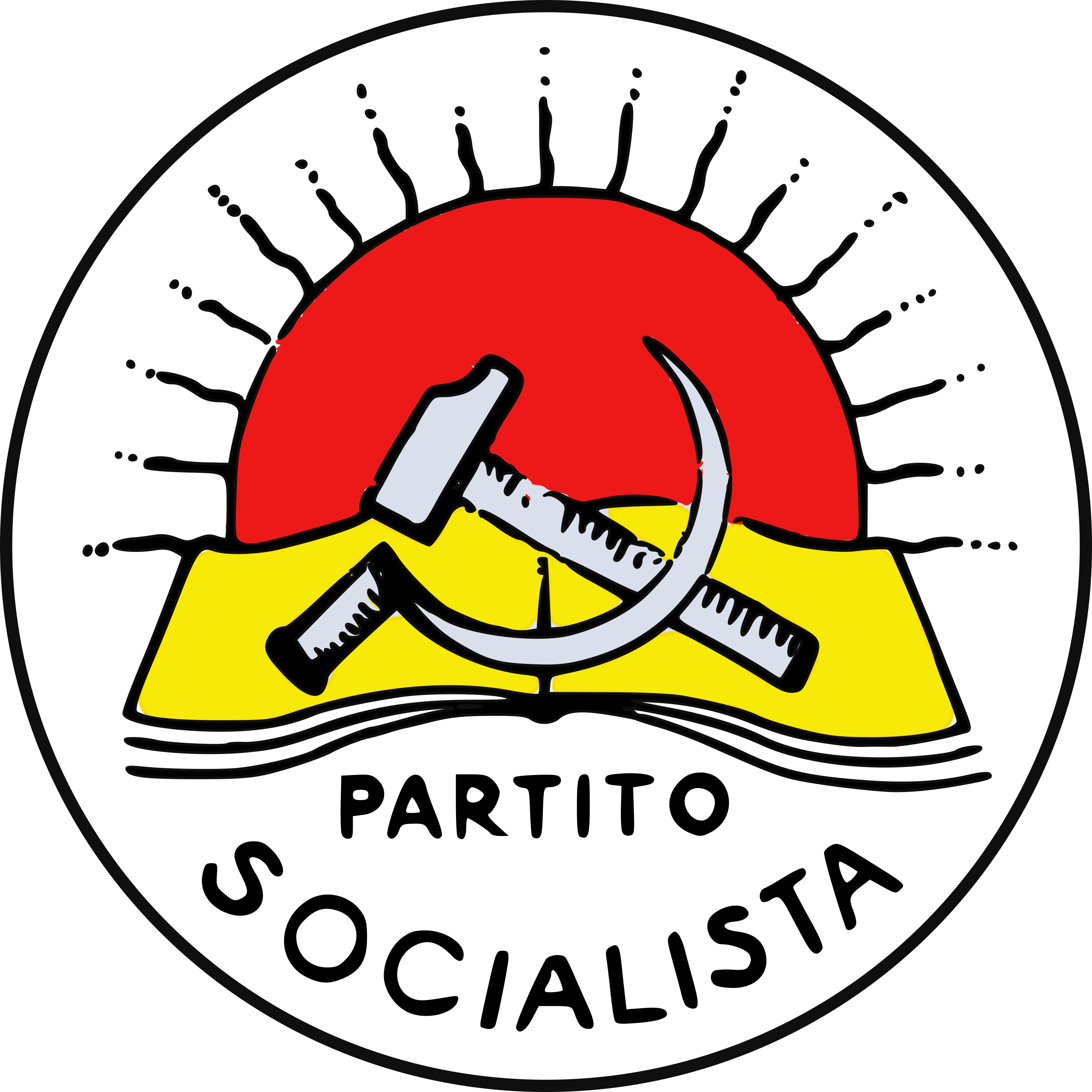
1943–1947

1947–1966

1970–1978

1978–1987

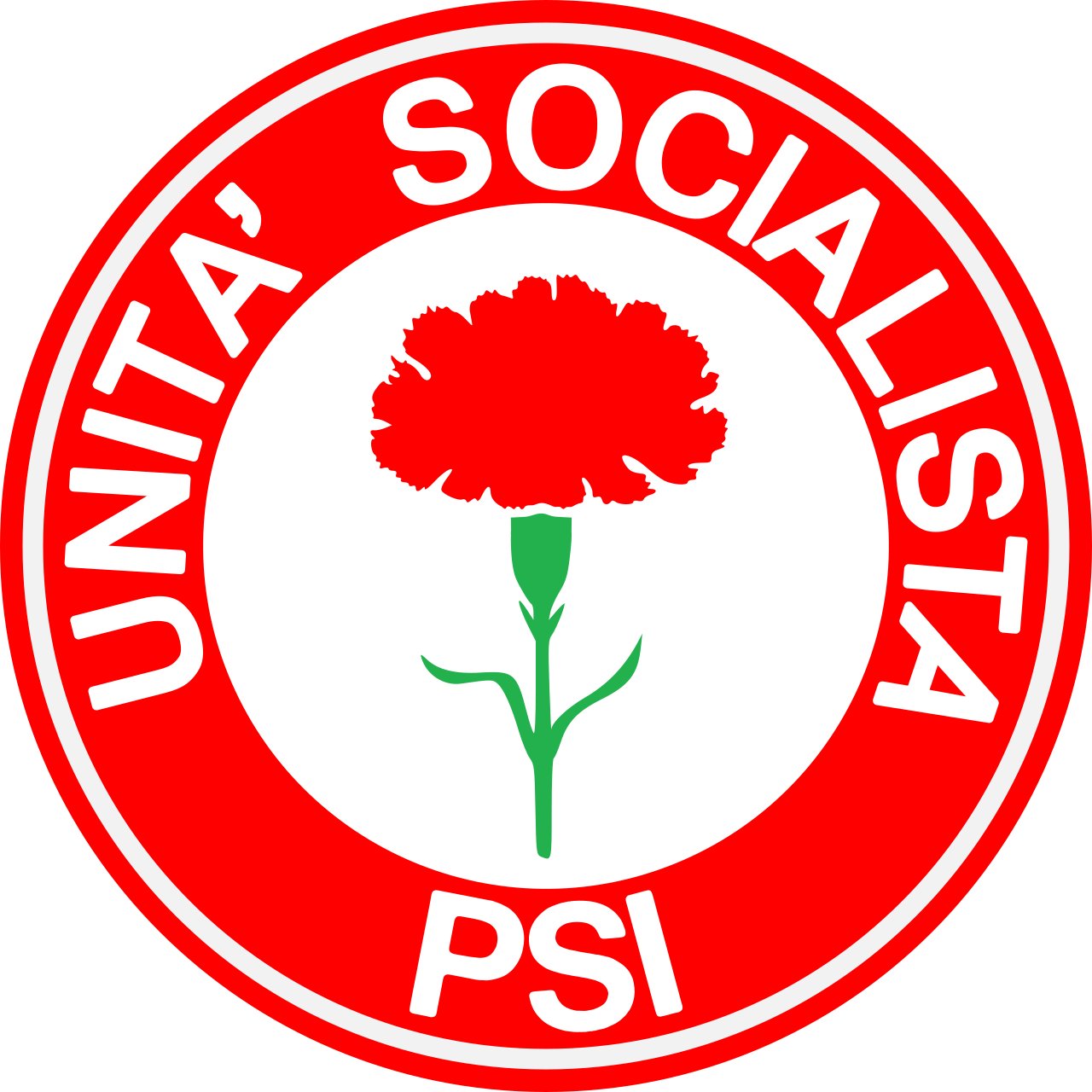
1991–1993

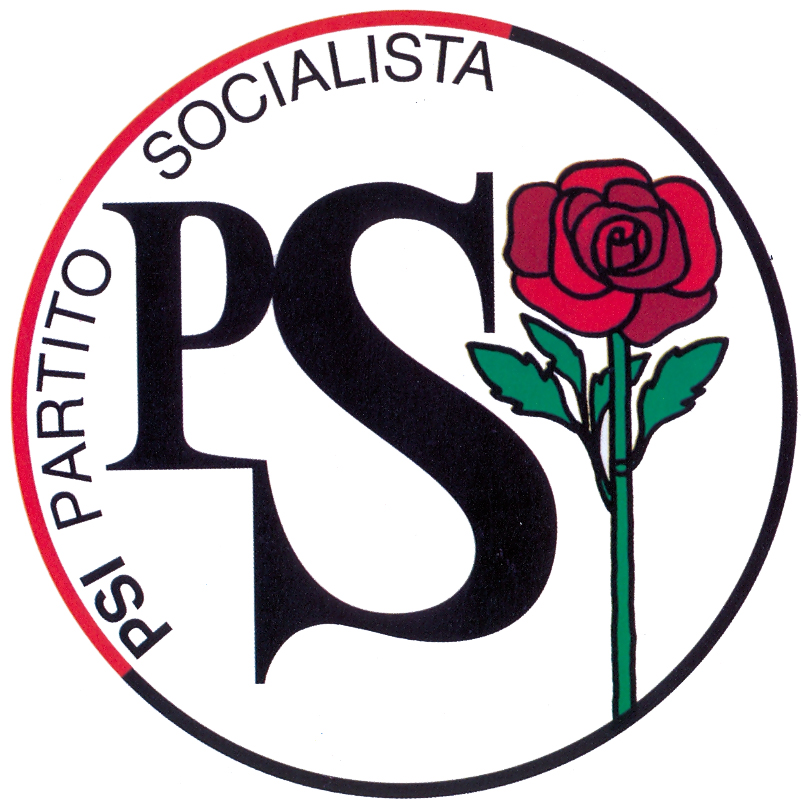
1993–1994
