= Domenico Fioritto =

Italian politician (1872–1952)

Member of the Constituent Assembly of Italy
- In office 1946–1948
- Constituency: Apulia

Secretary of the Italian Socialist Party
- In office 1921–1923
- Preceded by: Giovanni Bacci
- Succeeded by: Tito Oro Nobili

Personal details
- Born: 3 August 1872 Sannicandro Garganico, Province of Foggia, Kingdom of Italy
- Died: 25 July 1952 (aged 79) Sannicandro Garganico, Province of Foggia, Italy
- Party: Italian Socialist Party
- Profession: Lawyer

Domenico Fioritto (3 August 1872 – 25 July 1952) was an Italian politician and lawyer. A member of the Italian Socialist Party, he served as its national secretary from 1921 to 1923, was president of the Province of Foggia in the post-war period, and served in the Constituent Assembly of Italy.
