= Bobo Craxi =

Italian politician (born 1964)

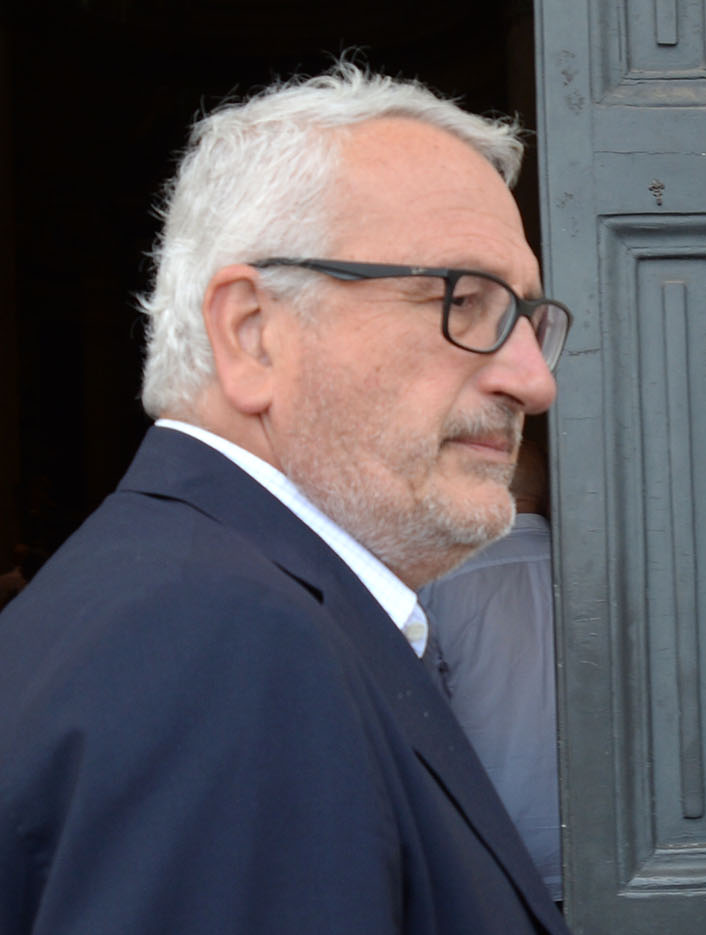
- Craxi in 2025

Member of the Chamber of Deputies
- In office 30 May 2001 – 28 April 2006
- Constituency: Sicily 1

Personal details
- Born: Vittorio Michele Craxi; 6 August 1964 (age 61) Milan, Italy
- Party: PSI (until 1994); SI (1994–1998); SDI (1998–2000); LS (2000–2001); NPSI (2001–2006); SI (2006–2007); PS (2007–2009); SU (2009–2010); PSI (2010–2017; since 2019)
- Spouse: Scintilla Cicconi
- Children: 2
- Parent: Bettino Craxi (father)
- Relatives: Stefania Craxi (sister)

Vittorio Michele "Bobo" Craxi (born 6 August 1964) is an Italian politician, son of the former Italian Prime Minister Bettino Craxi and brother of fellow politician Stefania Craxi.

== Biography ==
Formerly a prominent member of the Italian Socialist Party and Socialist League, he was a founder of the New Italian Socialist Party in 2001.

He has been elected MP at the Chamber of Deputies of Italy for the riding of Trapani in the 2001 general election in the House of Freedoms centre-right coalition, serving until 2006.

He left the NPSI in late January 2006 after the rejection, by a judicial court, of his claim of having been elected as new national Secretary.

Thus he founded a new movement, The Socialists, of which he was the leader for a period. The party was part of the centre-left coalition The Union, and eventually merged into the refounded Socialist Party in 2007.

In 2006–2008, Craxi served in the Prodi government as undersecretary of Foreign Affairs, delegated to United Nations relationships.

Bobo Craxi was candidate among the ranks of PSI for the Regional Council of Lazio in 2010 and for the Senate in 2013, but on both occasions he was not elected.

On 24 October 2015, he founded Socialist Area (Italian: Area Socialista), as internal faction of the Italian Socialist Party.

On the occasion of the 2022 Italian general election, he was a candidate for the centre-left coalition in the single-member constituency Sicily 1-02, but he got only 15% of the votes and he was not elected.

He is an atheist.
