= Margherita Boniver =

Italian politician (born 1938)

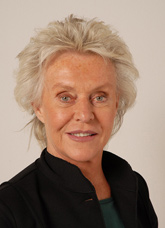

Minister of Tourism and Entertainment
- In office 28 June 1992 – 28 April 1993
- Prime Minister: Giuliano Amato
- Preceded by: Carlo Tognoli
- Succeeded by: Carlo Azeglio Ciampi

Member of the Chamber of Deputies
- In office 2 July 1987 – 22 April 1992
- In office 28 April 2006 – 15 March 2013

Member of the Senate of the Republic
- In office 29 January 1980 – 11 July 1983
- In office 22 April 1992 – 14 April 1994

Member of the European Parliament
- In office 15 September 1987 – 24 July 1989

Personal details
- Born: 11 March 1938 (age 88) Rome, Italy
- Party: PSI (till 1994); PS (1996–1999); FI (1999–2009); PdL (2009–2013)
- Education: Georgetown University
- Occupation: Journalist, politician

Margherita Boniver (Italian pronunciation: [marɡeˈriːta boniˈvɛr]; born 11 March 1938) is an Italian politician.

== Life and career ==
Boniver was born in Rome on 11 March 1938. Until 1962, she lived abroad, in places such as Washington, D.C., Bucharest, and London. In Italy, she founded the Italian section of Amnesty International which she led from 1973 to 1980. She was a member of the Italian Chamber of Deputies for the Italian Socialist Party (PSI) from 1987 to 1992, and then of the Italian Senate from 1992 to 1994. She also served as Member of the European Parliament from 1987 to 1989. Between 1991 and 1993 she served twice as minister: Minister for Italians Abroad in the Andreotti VII Cabinet and Minister of Tourism in the Amato I Cabinet.

After the disbanding of PSI, Boniver joined Silvio Berlusconi's Forza Italia along with many other Socialists. After having unsuccessfully run again for the Italian Senate in 2001, she was appointed and served until 2006 as Undersecretary of Foreign Affairs in Berlusconi's II and III cabinets. In 2006 and 2008, she was re-elected to the Chamber of Deputies, representing the social-democratic wing of the party.
