= Valdastico =

- Comune
- Comune di Valdastico
- Location within Italy Location within Veneto
- Coordinates: 45°53′N 11°22′E
- Country: Italy
- Region: Veneto
- Province: Vicenza (VI)
- Frazioni: Forni, Pedescala, San Pietro, Valpegara

Government
  - Mayor: Claudio Guglielmi

Area
  - Total: 23 km^{2} (8.9 sq mi)
- Elevation: 405 m (1,329 ft)

Population (31 December 2015)
  - Total: 1,297
  - Density: 56/km^{2} (150/sq mi)
- Demonym: Valdasticensi
- Time zone: UTC+1 (CET)
  - Summer (DST): UTC+2 (CEST)
- Postal code: 36040
- Dialing code: 0445
- Website: Official website

Valdastico (Venetian: Valdastego, Cimbrian: Astetal) is a town in the province of Vicenza, Veneto, north-eastern Italy. It is east of SP350 road, on western ridge of the Sette Comuni plateau.

== Twin towns ==
Valdastico is twinned with:

- Encantado, Rio Grande do Sul, Brazil

== Sources ==
- (Google Maps)
