= Mario Malatesta =

Italian football player and manager (1908–1970)

- Malatesta with Liguria in 1938

Personal information
- Date of birth: 29 February 1908
- Place of birth: Rome, Kingdom of Italy
- Date of death: 19 November 1970 (aged 62)
- Place of death: Rome, Italy
- Position: Midfielder

Youth career
- 1922–1924: Alba Roma

Senior career*
Years	Team	Apps	(Gls)
1924–1928	Edera Trieste		
1928–1929	Spezia	26	(9)
1929–1932	Lazio	72	(16)
1932–1933	Milan	6	(2)
1933–1940	Sampierdarenese/Liguria	184	(2)
1940–1941	Ascoli	24	(5)
1941–1943	Aosta		
Total		312	(34)

Managerial career
- 1940–1941: Ascoli
- 1941–1943: Aosta
- 1945–1946: Perugia
- 1946–1947: Seregno
- 1948–1949: Edera Trieste
- 1949–1950: Perugia
- 1950s: AC Milan (youth)
- 1950s: Olympiacos
- * Club domestic league appearances and goals

Mario Malatesta (29 February 1908 – 19 November 1970) was an Italian football manager and player who played as a midfielder.

He played 235 matches and scored 19 goals in Serie A across spells with Lazio, Milan, and Sampierdarenese.

== Playing career ==
Malatesta began his senior career in 1928 with Spezia Calcio, winning promotion to Serie B. In 1929, he moved to Lazio, making 72 Serie A appearances over three seasons. After a brief spell at Milan, he joined Sampierdarenese (later renamed Liguria) in 1933, winning the 1933–34 Serie B title and remaining with the club until 1940. He ended his playing career in Serie C with Ascoli and Aosta.

== Honours ==
=== Player ===
Sampierdarenese

- Serie B: 1933–34

Spezia

- Prima Divisione: 1928–29

=== Manager ===
Perugia

- Serie C: 1945–46 (Girone B Centro-Sud)
