= Antonio Leone (politician) =

Italian lawyer and politician

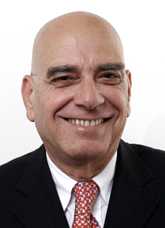

President of the Presidential Council of Tax Justice
- Incumbent
- Assumed office 18 September 2018

Member of the Chamber of Deputies
- In office 9 May 1996 – 26 September 2014

Personal details
- Born: 16 January 1948 (age 78)
- Party: FI (till 2008); PdL (2008–2013); NCD (2013–2014)

Antonio Leone (born 16 January 1948) is an Italian lawyer and politician. He served as Vice President of the Chamber of Deputies during Legislature XVI, from 2008 to 2013. He was a member of the High Council of the Judiciary from 2014 to 2018. Since 2018 he has been President of the Presidential Council of Tax Justice.

Leone was first elected to the Chamber of Deputies for the constituency of Apulia during Legislature XIII, in 1996. He was a member of Forza Italia until 2008, of The People of Freedom from 2008 to 2013, and of New Centre-Right from 2013 to 2014.
