= Il sorpasso (economics) =

Italy's 1987 overtaking of Britain's economy in nominal GDP per capita

Il sorpasso ([il sorˈpasso]; Italian for "the overtaking") is a term used by Italian press and commentators to designate Italy's 1987 overtaking of Britain's economy in nominal GDP terms. Italy's per capita income reached $15,120 by 1989, compared with Britain's $14,160 (and the USA's $20,630). Italy thus became the sixth largest economy in the world, after the United States, the Soviet Union, Japan, West Germany and France. In 1991, according to Business International, Italy overtook France as well and reached the fourth position due to the dissolution of the Soviet Union. In the late 1990s, after some years of stagnation of the Italian economy, both the United Kingdom and France regained their position.

In 2009, concurrently with the Great Recession, the UK was briefly overtaken by Italy for a second time, leading the Italian ambassador in London, Giancarlo Aragona, to talk of a secondo sorpasso.

In the late 2010s, the same term was used to describe a possible overtaking of Italy by Spain in terms of GDP per capita (something that did not end up happening).

The term has also been used to describe expectations that China's economy will one day overtake that of the United States.
