= Italian Reformists =

Italian Reformists Riformisti Italiani
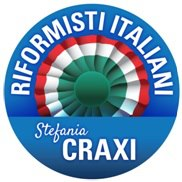
- President: Stefania Craxi
- Founded: 26 November 2011
- Split from: The People of Freedom
- Headquarters: Via Montevideo 2/A; 00198 Rome
- Youth wing: Giovani Riformisti
- Ideology: Reformism
- National affiliation: Forza Italia

Website
- www.riformistitaliani.it

The Italian Reformists (Riformisti Italiani) is a political party/association in Italy.

The group was launched on 26 November 2011 by Stefania Craxi, deputy of the centre-right The People of Freedom (PdL) party, undersecretary of Foreign Affairs in Berlusconi IV Cabinet and daughter of Bettino Craxi (leader of the Italian Socialist Party from 1976 to 1993). In her remarks at the group's founding convention, Stefania Craxi explained that the Reformists would have two main goals: uniting all Italian Socialists (most of them were in the PdL) and transforming Italy into a presidential republic.

On 15 December 2011 Stefania Craxi announced that she was leaving the PdL. Since 1 March 2012 the party is represented in the regional council of Liguria by Raffaella Della Bianca, elected within the list of PdL in 2010. The party stood in the 2013 general election as a standalone list, receiving just 0.02% for the Chamber of Deputies.
