= Stefania Craxi =

Italian politician (born 1960)

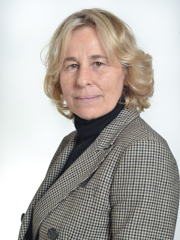
- Stefania Craxi in 2018

Undersecretary of State at the Ministry of Foreign Affairs
- In office 12 May 2008 – 16 November 2011
- Prime Minister: Silvio Berlusconi

Member of the Senate of the Republic
- Incumbent
- Assumed office 23 March 2018
- Constituency: Monza (2018–2022); Gela (since 2022)

Member of the Chamber of Deputies
- In office 28 April 2006 – 14 March 2013
- Constituency: Lombardy

Personal details
- Born: Stefania Gabriella Anastasia Craxi; 25 October 1960 (age 65) Milan, Italy
- Party: FI (2018–present)
- Other party: FI (2006–2009); PdL (2009–2011); RI (2011–2018)
- Children: 3

Stefania Gabriella Anastasia Craxi (born 25 October 1960) is an Italian politician. She served as undersecretary of State at the Ministry of Foreign Affairs during the fourth Berlusconi government and was a member of the Chamber of Deputies between 2006 and 2013. She has been a senator since 2018. She is a member of the centre-right Forza Italia party.

== Early life and production career ==
Stefania Craxi was born in Milan on 25 October 1960. She is the daughter of former Italian Prime Minister Bettino Craxi and the sister of politician Bobo Craxi.

In 1985, Craxi started working as a TV show producer, before founding her own production company the following year. She left her career as a producer in 2000, after the death of her father, and founded the Craxi Foundation. The foundation has the goal of celebrating the political life of Bettino Craxi, who was found guilty of political corruption and illicit financing.

== Political career ==
Craxi entered politics in 2006, when she was elected to the Chamber of Deputies with Forza Italia. She was re-elected in 2008, among the ranks of The People of Freedom. Between 2008 and 2011, she served as undersecretary of State at the Ministry of Foreign Affairs in the Fourth Berlusconi government. In 2011, she left The People of Freedom and founded the Italian Reformists.

At the 2018 general election, Craxi was a candidate for the Senate in the single-member constituency of Monza-Seregno (supported by the centre-right coalition), and was elected with 46.79% of the votes.

At the 2022 general election, Craxi was elected to the Senate in the single-member constituency of Gela, supported by Forza Italia (part of the centre-right coalition). She was then elected president of the Senate committee on foreign affairs and defence. In 2026, she was elected parliamentary leader of Forza Italia at the Senate. She replaced Maurizio Gasparri, who resigned in the aftermath of the defeat of the centre-right-backed proposal to reform the judicial system at the 2026 constitutional referendum.

== Personal life ==
Craxi was married to entrepreneur Renato Neri, with whom she had a son, Federico, in 1987. She later married manager Marco Bassetti, with whom she had two daughters, Benedetta and Anita, in 1991.

== Electoral history ==
Election	House	Constituency	Party	Votes	Result
2006	Chamber of Deputies	Lombardy 1	FI	– (Note: Candidate in a closed list proportional representation system.)	Elected
2008	Chamber of Deputies	Lombardy 1	PdL	–	Elected
2018	Senate of the Republic	Lombardy – Monza	FI	142,960	Elected
2022	Senate of the Republic	Sicily – Gela	FI	101,913	Elected
