= Results of the 2022 Italian general election =

Result map

Results in the Chamber of Deputies by first-past-the-post (FPTP) voting

Results in the Senate of the Republic by FPTP voting

The 2022 Italian general election was held on 25 September, resulting in a majority of seats of both houses of the Italian Parliament for the centre-right coalition. The Meloni Cabinet was announced on 21 October and was officially sworn in on the next day. The first Cabinet headed by a female Prime Minister of Italy, it was variously described as a shift to the political right, as well as the first far-right-led Italian government since World War II. The Meloni Cabinet successfully won the confidence votes on 25–26 October with a comfortable majority in both houses of Parliament.

== Voter turnout ==
Voter turnout was the lowest in the history of republican Italy at 63.9%, about 9 percentage points below the 2018 election.

Region	Time		
Region	12:00	19:00	23:00
Abruzzo	17.16%	51.38%	63.99%
Aosta Valley	19.92%	48.76%	60.59%
Apulia	16.80%	42.57%	56.56%
Basilicata	13.86%	41.27%	58.77%
Calabria	12.84%	36.91%	50.80%
Campania	12.44%	38.70%	53.27%
Emilia-Romagna	23.46%	59.74%	71.97%
Friuli-Venezia Giulia	21.68%	56.20%	66.21%
Lazio	20.83%	53.42%	64.34%
Liguria	21.89%	53.44%	64.19%
Lombardy	22.42%	58.34%	70.09%
Marche	20.15%	55.69%	68.39%
Molise	13.00%	44.04%	56.54%
Piedmont	20.47%	53.60%	66.35%
Sardinia	15.58%	40.96%	53.17%
Sicily	14.77%	41.89%	57.34%
Tuscany	22.31%	58.06%	69.75%
Trentino-Alto Adige	18.93%	52.54%	66.04%
Umbria	20.09%	56.07%	68.83%
Veneto	22.13%	57.57%	70.17%
Total	19.21%	51.14%	63.91%
Source: Ministry of the Interior

== Chamber of Deputies ==
=== Vote and seats share ===
Popular vote (party)
FdI	25.99%
PD	19.07%
M5S	15.43%
Lega	8.77%
FI	8.11%
A–IV	7.79%
AVS	3.63%
+E	2.83%
Italexit	1.90%
UP	1.43%
ISP	1.24%
NM	0.91%
ScN	0.76%
V	0.72%
IC	0.60%

Seat distribution (party)
FdI	30.00%
PD	17.25%
Lega	16.50%
M5S	13.00%
FI	11.25%
A–IV	5.25%
AVS	3.00%
NM	1.75%
Others	2.00%

Popular vote (coalition)
CDX	43.79%
CSX	26.13%
M5S	15.43%
A–IV	7.79%
Others	6.86%

Seat distribution (coalition)
CDX	59.25%
CSX	21.25%
M5S	13.00%
A–IV	5.25%
Others	1.25%

==== Overall results ====
← Summary of the 25 September 2022 Chamber of Deputies election results
Coalition	Party	Proportional			First-past-the-post			Aosta Valley			Overseas			Total seats
Coalition	Party	Votes	%	Seats	Votes	%	Seats	Votes	%	Seats	Votes	%	Seats	Total seats
Centre-right	Brothers of Italy	7,302,517	26.00	69	12,300,244	43.79	49	16,016	28.80	–	281,949	26.00	1	119
Centre-right	League	2,464,005	8.77	23	12,300,244	43.79	42	16,016	28.80	–	281,949	26.00	1	66
Centre-right	Forza Italia	2,278,217	8.11	22	12,300,244	43.79	23	16,016	28.80	–	281,949	26.00	–	45
Centre-right	Us Moderates	255,505	0.91	–	12,300,244	43.79	7	16,016	28.80	–	—N/a	—N/a	—N/a	7
Centre-left	Democratic Party – IDP	5,356,180	19.07	57	7,337,975	26.13	8	(Note: Within Aosta Valley)	—N/a	—N/a	305,759	28.20	4	69
Centre-left	Greens and Left Alliance	1,018,669	3.63	11	7,337,975	26.13	1	—N/a	—N/a	—N/a	52,994	4.89	–	12
Centre-left	More Europe	793,961	2.83	–	7,337,975	26.13	2	—N/a	—N/a	—N/a	29,971	2.76	–	2
Centre-left	Civic Commitment	169,165	0.60	–	7,337,975	26.13	1	—N/a	—N/a	—N/a	11,590	1.07	–	1
Five Star Movement		4,333,972	15.43	41	4,333,972	15.43	10	—N/a	—N/a	—N/a	93,338	8.61	1	52
Action – Italia Viva		2,186,669	7.79	21	2,186,669	7.79	–		—N/a	—N/a	60,499	5.58	–	21
South Tyrolean People's Party – PATT		117,010	0.42	1	117,010	0.42	2	—N/a	—N/a	—N/a	—N/a	—N/a	—N/a	3
South calls North		212,685	0.76	–	212,685	0.76	1	—N/a	—N/a	—N/a	—N/a	—N/a	—N/a	1
Aosta Valley		—N/a	—N/a	—N/a	—N/a	—N/a	—N/a	20,763	38.63	1	—N/a	—N/a	—N/a	1
Associative Movement of Italians Abroad		—N/a	—N/a	—N/a	—N/a	—N/a	—N/a	—N/a	—N/a	—N/a	141,356	13.04	1	1
Others		1,599,227	5.68	–	1,599,227	5.68	–	16,967	32.57	–	106,847	9.85	–	–
Total		28,087,782	100	245	28,087,782	100	146	53,746	100	1	1,084,303	100	8	400

Notes

Popular vote (party)
FdI	25.98%
PD	19.04%
M5S	15.43%
Lega	8.79%
FI	8.11%
A–IV	7.78%
AVS	3.64%
+E	2.83%
Others	8.40%

Seat distribution (party)
FdI	30.00%
PD	17.25%
Lega	16.50%
M5S	13.00%
FI	11.25%
A–IV	5.25%
AVS	3.00%
NM	1.75%
Others	2.00%

Popular vote (coalition)
CDX	43.79%
CSX	26.12%
M5S	15.43%
A–IV	7.78%
Others	6.88%

Seat distribution (coalition)
CDX	59.25%
CSX	21.25%
M5S	13.00%
A–IV	5.25%
Others	1.25%

==== Proportional results ====
Proportional distribution of seats by party in the Chamber of Deputies

Party	Votes	%	Seats
Brothers of Italy (FdI)	7,301,303	25.98	69
Democratic Party – IDP (PD–IDP)	5,348,676	19.04	57
Five Star Movement (M5S)	4,335,494	15.43	41
League (Lega)	2,470,318	8.79	23
Forza Italia (FI)	2,279,266	8.11	22
Action – Italia Viva (A–IV)	2,186,505	7.78	21
Greens and Left Alliance (AVS)	1,021,808	3.64	11
More Europe (+E)	796,057	2.83	–
Italexit for Italy (Italexit)	534,950	1.90	–
People's Union (UP)	403,149	1.43	–
Sovereign and Popular Italy (ISP)	348,831	1.24	–
Us Moderates (NM)	254,127	0.91	–
South calls North (ScN)	212,954	0.76	–
Vita (V)	201,737	0.72	–
Civic Commitment (IC)	173,555	0.62	–
South Tyrolean People's Party – PATT (SVP–PATT)	117,032	0.42	1
Us of the Centre – Europeanists (NDC–Eu)	46,230	0.16	–
Italian Communist Party (PCI)	24,549	0.09	–
Animalist Party – UCDL – 10VM (PAI–UCDL–10VM)	21,451	0.08	–
Alternative for Italy (APLI)	17,137	0.06	–
Party of Creative Madness (PFC)	1,419	0.00	–
Free (F)	829	0.00	–
Force of the People (FdP)	819	0.00	–
Total	28,098,196	100.00	245
Invalid / blank / unassigned votes	1,286,915	4.38	–
Total turnout	29,385,111	63.85	–
Registered voters	46,021,956	–	–
Source: Ministry of the Interior

==== First-past-the-post results ====
Winning candidates in constituencies for the Chamber of Deputies

Party or coalition	Votes	%	Seats
Centre-right coalition (CDX)	12,305,014	43.79	121
Centre-left coalition (CSX)	7,340,096	26.12	12
Five Star Movement (M5S)	4,335,494	15.43	10
Action – Italia Viva (A–IV)	2,186,505	7.78	–
Italexit for Italy (Italexit)	534,950	1.90	–
People's Union (UP)	403,149	1.43	–
Sovereign and Popular Italy (ISP)	348,831	1.24	–
South calls North (ScN)	212,954	0.76	1
Vita (V)	201,737	0.72	–
South Tyrolean People's Party – PATT (SVP–PATT)	117,032	0.42	2
Us of the Centre – Europeanists (NDC–Eu)	46,230	0.16	–
Italian Communist Party (PCI)	24,549	0.09	–
Animalist Party – UCDL – 10VM (PAI–UCDL–10VM)	21,451	0.08	–
Alternative for Italy (APLI)	17,137	0.06	–
Party of Creative Madness (PFC)	1,419	0.00	–
Free (F)	829	0.00	–
Force of the People (FdP)	819	0.00	–
Total	28,098,196	100.00	146
Invalid / blank / unassigned votes	1,286,915	4.38	–
Total turnout	29,385,111	63.85	–
Registered voters	46,021,956	–	–
Source: Ministry of the Interior

==== Aosta Valley ====
The autonomous region of Aosta Valley in northwestern Italy elects one member to the Chamber of Deputies through a direct first-past-the-post election. Some parties that formed electoral coalitions in Italy might have opted to run against one another, or form different coalitions, in this particular region.

Candidate	Party	Votes	%	Result
Franco Manes	Aosta Valley (VdA) (Note: Including Democratic Party (PD), Action (A), Italia Viva (IV), Valdostan Union (UV), Valdostan Alliance (AV), United Aosta Valley (VdAU), and Edelweiss (SA))	20,763	38.63	Elected
Emily Rini	Centre-right coalition (Lega–FI–NM–FdI)	16,016	28.80	
Giovanni Girardini	The Valdostan Renaissance (LRV)	6,398	11.90	
Erika Guichardaz	Open Aosta Valley (Open VdA) (Note: Including Five Star Movement (M5S), Democratic Area – Autonomist Left (AD–GA), Environment Rights Equality (ADU), and Italian Left (SI))	5,841	10.87	
Loredana Ronc	Sovereign and Popular Italy (ISP)	2,302	4.28	
Loredana De Rosa	People's Union (UP)	1,375	2.56	
Davide Ianni	Italian Communist Party (PCI)	1,051	1.96	
Total		53,746	100.00	1
Invalid / blank / unassigned votes		5,740	9.66	–
Total turnout		59,490	60.59	–
Registered voters		98,187	–	–
Source: Ministry of the Interior

==== Overseas constituencies ====
Eight members of the Chamber of Deputies are elected by Italians abroad. Two members are elected for North America and Central America (including most of the Caribbean), two members for South America (including Trinidad and Tobago), three members for Europe, and one member for the rest of the world (Africa, Asia, Oceania, and Antarctica). Voters in these regions select candidate lists and cast a preference vote for individual candidates. The seats are allocated by proportional representation. The electoral law allows for parties to form different coalitions on the lists abroad, compared to the lists in Italy; Forza Italia, the League, and Brothers of Italy formed a unified list for abroad constituencies.

Party	Votes	%	Seats
Democratic Party – IDP (PD–IDP)	306,105	28.20	4
League – Forza Italia – Brothers of Italy (Lega–FI–FdI)	282,636	26.04	2
Associative Movement of Italians Abroad (MAIE)	141,440	13.03	1
Five Star Movement (M5S)	93,219	8.59	1
South American Union of Italian Emigrants (USEI)	73,389	6.76	–
Action – Italia Viva (A–IV)	60,456	5.57	–
Greens and Left Alliance (AVS)	52,962	4.88	–
More Europe (+E)	29,947	2.76	–
Movement of Freedoms (MdL)	18,348	1.69	–
Italy of the South (IdM)	15,442	1.42	–
Civic Commitment (IC)	11,608	1.07	–
Total	1,085,552	100.00	8
Invalid / blank / unassigned votes	164,929	13.19	–
Total turnout	1,250,481	26.36	–
Registered voters	4,743,980	–	–
Source: Ministry of the Interior

=== Results by constituency ===
FPTP results by constituency
Constituency	Total seats	Seats won				
Constituency	Total seats	CDX	CSX	M5S	SVP–PATT	ScN
Abruzzo	3	3				
Aosta Valley	1		1			
Apulia	10	9		1		
Basilicata	1	1				
Calabria	5	4		1		
Campania 1	7			7		
Campania 2	7	7				
Emilia-Romagna	11	7	4			
Friuli-Venezia Giulia	3	3				
Lazio 1	9	7	2			
Lazio 2	5	5				
Liguria	4	3	1			
Lombardy 1	9	7	2			
Lombardy 2	5	5				
Lombardy 3	5	5				
Lombardy 4	4	4				
Marche	4	4				
Molise	1	1				
Piedmont 1	5	4	1			
Piedmont 2	5	5				
Sardinia	4	4				
Sicily 1	6	5		1		
Sicily 2	6	5				1
Trentino-Alto Adige	4	2			2	
Tuscany	9	7	2			
Umbria	2	2				
Veneto 1	5	5				
Veneto 2	7	7				
Total	147	121	13	10	2	1
Source: Ministry of the Interior

Proportional results by constituency
Constituency	Total seats	Seats won					
Constituency	Total seats	CDX	CSX	M5S	A–IV	SVP–PATT	MAIE
Abruzzo	6	3	2	1			
Apulia	17	7	4	5	1		
Basilicata	3	1	1	1			
Calabria	8	4	2	2			
Campania 1	13	3	3	6	1		
Campania 2	11	4	3	3	1		
Emilia-Romagna	18	8	6	2	2		
Friuli-Venezia Giulia	5	3	1		1		
Lazio 1	15	7	4	2	2		
Lazio 2	7	4	2	1			
Liguria	6	3	2	1			
Lombardy 1	16	7	5	2	2		
Lombardy 2	9	5	1	2	1		
Lombardy 3	9	5	2	1	1		
Lombardy 4	7	4	2		1		
Marche	6	3	2	1			
Molise	1		1				
Piedmont 1	10	4	4	1	1		
Piedmont 2	9	5	2		1		
Sardinia	7	3	2	2			
Sicily 1	9	4	1	3	1		
Sicily 2	11	5	2	3	1		
Trentino-Alto Adige	3	1	1			1	
Tuscany	15	6	5	2	2		
Umbria	4	2	2				
Veneto 1	8	5	2		1		
Veneto 2	12	7	3	1	1		
Overseas	8	2	4	1			1
Total	253	116	72	42	21	1	1
Source: Ministry of the Interior

== Senate of the Republic ==
=== Vote and seats share ===
Popular vote (party)
FdI	26.01%
PD	18.96%
M5S	15.55%
Lega	8.85%
FI	8.27%
A–IV	7.73%
AVS	3.53%
+E	2.94%
Italexit	1.87%
UP	1.36%
ISP	1.12%
ScN	0.99%
NM	0.89%
V	0.71%
IC	0.56%

Seat distribution (party)
FdI	32.50%
PD	20.00%
Lega	15.00%
M5S	14.00%
FI	9.00%
A–IV	4.50%
AVS	2.00%
NM	1.00%
SVP–PATT	1.00%
Others	1.00%

Popular vote (coalition)
CDX	44.02%
CSX	25.99%
M5S	15.55%
A–IV	7.73%

Seat distribution (coalition)
CDX	57.50%
CSX	22.00%
M5S	14.00%
A–IV	4.50%
Others	2.00%

==== Overall results ====
← Summary of the 25 September 2022 Senate of the Republic election results
Coalition	Party	Proportional			First-past-the-post			Aosta Valley			Trentino-Alto Adige			Overseas			Total seats
Coalition	Party	Votes	%	Seats	Votes	%	Seats	Votes	%	Seats	Votes	%	Seats	Votes	%	Seats	Total seats
Centre-right	Brothers of Italy	7,167,136	26.01	34	12,129,547	44.02	31	18,509	34.05	–	137,015	27.24	–	294,712	27.05	–	65
Centre-right	League	2,439,200	8.85	13	12,129,547	44.02	14	18,509	34.05	1	137,015	27.24	1	294,712	27.05	–	29
Centre-right	Forza Italia	2,279,802	8.27	9	12,129,547	44.02	9	18,509	34.05	–	137,015	27.24	–	294,712	27.05	–	18
Centre-right	Us Moderates	243,409	0.88	–	12,129,547	44.02	2	18,509	34.05	–	137,015	27.24	1	—N/a	—N/a	—N/a	3
Centre-left	Democratic Party–IDP	5,226,732	18.96	31	7,161,688	25.99	4	(Note: Within Aosta Valley)	—N/a	—N/a	149,682	29,29	1	370,262	33.98	3	39
Centre-left	Greens and Left Alliance	972,316	3.53	3	7,161,688	25.99	1	—N/a	—N/a	—N/a	149,682	29,29	–	—N/a	—N/a	—N/a	4
Centre-left	Campobase	—N/a	—N/a	—N/a	7,161,688	25.99	–	—N/a	—N/a	—N/a	149,682	29,29	1	—N/a	—N/a	—N/a	1
Centre-left	Others	972,214	3.53	–	7,161,688	25.99	–	—N/a	—N/a	—N/a	149,682	29,29	–	14,610	1.34	0	0
Five Star Movement		4,285,894	15.55	23	4,285,894	15.55	5	—N/a	—N/a	—N/a	28,355	5.64	–	101,794	9.34	–	28
Action – Italia Viva		2,131,310	7.73	9	2,131,310	7.73	–		—N/a	—N/a	6,782	1.35	–	76,070	6.98	–	9
South Tyrolean People's Party – PATT		—N/a	—N/a	—N/a	—N/a	—N/a	—N/a	—N/a	—N/a	—N/a	116,003	23.06	2	—N/a	—N/a	—N/a	2
South calls North		271,549	0.99	–	271,549	0.99	1	—N/a	—N/a	—N/a	—N/a	—N/a	—N/a	—N/a	—N/a	—N/a	1
Associative Movement of Italians Abroad		—N/a	—N/a	—N/a	—N/a	—N/a	—N/a	—N/a	—N/a	—N/a	—N/a	—N/a	—N/a	138,758	12.73	1	1
Others		2,119,823	5,72	0	2,119,823	5,72	0	35,850	65.95	–	65.117	13.42	0	93,107	8.54	–	0
Total		27,569,675	100	122	27,569,675	100	67	54,359	100	1	502,954	100	6	1,090,147	100	4	200

Notes

Popular vote (party)
FdI	26.00%
PD	18.93%
M5S	15.56%
Lega	8.84%
FI	8.27%
A–IV	7.73%
AVS	3.53%
+E	2.94%
Others	8.20%

Seat distribution (party)
FdI	32.50%
PD	20.00%
Lega	15.00%
M5S	14.00%
FI	9.00%
A–IV	4.50%
AVS	2.00%
NM	1.00%
Others	2.00%

Popular vote (coalition)
CDX	44.02%
CSX	25.99%
M5S	15.56%
A–IV	7.73%
Others	6.70%

Seat distribution (coalition)
CDX	57.50%
CSX	22.00%
M5S	14.00%
A–IV	4.50%
Others	2.00%

==== Proportional results ====
Proportional distribution of seats by party in the Senate of the Republic

Party	Votes	%	Seats
Brothers of Italy (FdI)	7,168,875	26.00	34
Democratic Party – IDP (PD–IDP)	5,220,256	18.93	31
Five Star Movement (M5S)	4,290,194	15.55	23
League (Lega)	2,437,406	8.84	13
Forza Italia (FI)	2,281,258	8.27	9
Action – Italia Viva (A–IV)	2,131,023	7.73	9
Greens and Left Alliance (AVS)	972,780	3.53	3
More Europe (+E)	810,441	2.94	–
Italexit for Italy (Italexit)	515,657	1.87	–
People's Union (UP)	374,247	1.36	–
Sovereign and Popular Italy (ISP)	309,391	1.12	–
South calls North (ScN)	272,462	0.99	–
Us Moderates (NM)	248,308	0.90	–
Vita (V)	196,644	0.71	–
Civic Commitment (IC)	161,773	0.59	–
Italian Communist Party (PCI)	70,938	0.26	–
Us of the Centre – Europeanists (NDC–Eu)	42,905	0.16	–
Alternative for Italy (APLI)	40,397	0.15	–
Animalist Party – UCDL – 10VM (PAI–UCDL–10VM)	16,950	0.06	–
Workers' Communist Party (PCL)	4,491	0.02	–
United Right – Royal Italy (DU–IR)	2,415	0.01	–
Force of the People (FdP)	864	0.01	–
Total	27,569,675	100.00	122
Invalid / blank / unassigned votes	1,281,165	4.44	–
Total turnout	28,850,840	63.81	–
Registered voters	45,210,950	–	–
Source: Ministry of the Interior

==== First-past-the-post results ====
Winning candidates in constituencies for the Senate of the Republic

Party or coalition	Votes	%	Seats
Centre-right coalition (CDX)	12,135,847	44.02	56
Centre-left coalition (CSX)	7,165,250	25.99	5
Five Star Movement (M5S)	4,290,194	15.55	5
Action – Italia Viva (A–IV)	2,131,023	7.73	–
Italexit for Italy (Italexit)	515,657	1.87	–
People's Union (UP)	374,247	1.36	–
Sovereign and Popular Italy (ISP)	309,391	1.12	–
South calls North (ScN)	272,462	0.99	1
Vita (V)	196,644	0.71	–
Italian Communist Party (PCI)	70,938	0.26	–
Us of the Centre – Europeanists (NDC–Eu)	42,905	0.16	–
Alternative for Italy (APLI)	40,397	0.15	–
Animalist Party – UCDL – 10VM (PAI–UCDL–10VM)	16,950	0.06	–
Workers' Communist Party (PCL)	4,491	0.02	–
United Right – Royal Italy (DU–IR)	2,415	0.01	–
Force of the People (FdP)	864	0.01	–
Total	27,569,675	100.00	67
Invalid / blank / unassigned votes	1,281,165	4.44	–
Total turnout	28,850,840	63.81	–
Registered voters	45,210,950	–	–
Source: Ministry of the Interior

==== Aosta Valley ====
Candidate	Party	Votes	%	Result
Nicoletta Spelgatti	Centre-right coalition (Lega–FI–NM–FdI)	18,509	34.05	Elected
Patrik Vesan	Aosta Valley (VdA) (Note: Including Democratic Party (PD), Action (A), Italia Viva (IV), Valdostan Union (UV), Valdostan Alliance (AV), United Aosta Valley (VdAU), and Edelweiss (SA))	18,282	33.63	
Augusto Rollandin	For Autonomy (PlA)	7,272	13.38	
Daria Pulz	Open Aosta Valley (Open VdA) (Note: Including Five Star Movement (M5S), Democratic Area – Autonomist Left (AD–GA), Environment Rights Equality (ADU), and Italian Left (SI))	5,448	10.02	
Alessandro Bianchini	Sovereign and Popular Italy (ISP)	1,569	2.89	
Francesco Lucat	People's Union (UP)	1,311	2.41	
Guglielmo Leray	Italian Communist Party (PCI)	1,051	1.93	
Larisa Bargan	Vita (V)	917	1.69	
Total		54,359	100.00	1
Invalid / blank / unassigned votes		5,131	8.62	–
Total turnout		59,490	60.59	–
Registered voters		98,187	–	–

==== Trentino-Alto Adige ====
Party	Votes	%	Seats
Centre-right coalition (Lega–FI–NM–FdI)	137,015	27.24	2
South Tyrolean People's Party – PATT (SVP–PATT)	116,003	23.06	2
Centre-left coalition (CB–+E–AVS–PD–A–IV)	100,602	20.00	1
Five Star Movement (M5S)	28,355	5.64	–
Centre-left coalition (PD–IDP–+E–AVS)	21,894	4.35	1
Vita (V)	17,876	3.55	–
Greens and Left Alliance (AVS)	17,574	3.49	–
Sovereign and Popular Italy (ISP)	15,252	3.03	–
Die Freiheitlichen (DF)	14,479	2.88	–
Team K (TK)	11,157	2.22	–
Democratic Party – IDP (PD–IDP)	9,612	1.91	–
Action – Italia Viva (A–IV)	6,782	1.35	–
People's Union (UP)	6,353	1.26	–
Total	502,954	100.00	6
Invalid / blank / unassigned votes	32,625	6.09	–
Total turnout	811,006	66.04	–
Registered voters		–	–

==== Overseas constituencies ====
Four members of the Senate of the Republic are elected by Italians abroad. One member is elected for North America and Central America (including most of the Caribbean), one member for South America (including Trinidad and Tobago), one member for Europe, and one for the rest of the world (Africa, Asia, Oceania, and Antarctica). Voters in these regions select candidate lists and cast a preference vote for individual candidates. The seats are allocated by proportional representation. The electoral law allows for parties to form different coalitions on the lists abroad, compared to the lists in Italy; since January 2018, Forza Italia, the League, and Brothers of Italy have formed a unified list for abroad constituencies.

Party	Votes	%	Seats
Democratic Party – IDP (PD–IDP)	370,549	33.99	3
League – Forza Italia – Brothers of Italy (Lega–FI–FdI)	295,467	27.10	–
Associative Movement of Italians Abroad (MAIE)	138,337	12.69	1
Five Star Movement (M5S)	101,925	9.35	–
Action – Italia Viva (A–IV)	76,152	6.99	–
South American Union of Italian Emigrants (USEI)	55,523	5.09	–
Movement of Freedoms (MdL)	23,384	2.15	–
Civic Commitment (IC)	14,610	1.34	–
Italy of the South (IdM)	14,200	1.30	–
Total	1,090,147	100.00	4
Invalid / blank / unassigned votes	143,681	11.65	–
Total turnout	1.233.828	26.01	–
Registered voters	4,743,980	–	–
Source: Ministry of the Interior

=== Results by constituency ===
FPTP results by constituency
Constituency	Total seats	Seats won				
Constituency	Total seats	CDX	CSX	M5S	SVP–PATT	ScN
Abruzzo	1	1				
Aosta Valley	1	1				
Apulia	5	5				
Basilicata	1	1				
Calabria	2	2				
Campania	7	3		4		
Emilia-Romagna	5	3	2			
Friuli-Venezia Giulia	1	1				
Lazio	6	6				
Liguria	2	2				
Lombardy	11	10	1			
Marche	2	2				
Molise	1	1				
Piedmont	5	4	1			
Sardinia	2	2				
Sicily	6	4		1		1
Trentino-Alto Adige	6	2	2		2	
Tuscany	4	3	1			
Umbria	1	1				
Veneto	5	5				
Total	74	59	7	5	2	1
Source: Ministry of the Interior

Proportional results by constituency
Constituency	Total seats	Seats won				
Constituency	Total seats	CDX	CSX	M5S	A–IV	MAIE
Abruzzo	3	1	1	1		
Apulia	8	4	2	2		
Basilicata	2	1		1		
Calabria	4	2	1	1		
Campania	11	4	2	4	1	
Emilia-Romagna	9	4	3	1	1	
Friuli-Venezia Giulia	3	2	1			
Lazio	12	6	3	2	1	
Liguria	3	1	1	1		
Lombardy	20	10	6	2	2	
Marche	3	1	1	1		
Molise	1	1				
Piedmont	9	4	3	1	1	
Sardinia	3	1	1	1		
Sicily	10	4	2	3	1	
Tuscany	8	3	3	1	1	
Umbria	2	1	1			
Veneto	11	6	3	1	1	
Overseas	4		3			1
Total	126	56	37	23	9	1
Source: Ministry of the Interior

== Analysis of proportionality ==
Using the Gallagher index, the disproportionality of both houses was 12.31 and 10.83. For comparison, the disproportionality in the 2018 election was 5.50 and 6.12.

Chamber of Deputies
Coalition	Vote share	Seat share	Difference	Difference²
Centre-right coalition	43.78	59.25	+15.47	239.32
Centre-left coalition	26.13	21.25	−4.88	23.81
Five Star Movement	15.43	13.00	−2.43	5.90
Action – Italia Viva	7.79	5.25	−2.54	6.45
SVP–PATT	0.42	0.75	+0.33	0.11
South calls North	0.76	0.25	−0.51	0.26
MAIE	0.48	0.25	−0.23	0.05
Others	5.21	0.00	−5.21	27.14
			TOTAL	303.04
			TOTAL /2	151.52
			√TOTAL /2	12.31

Senate of the Republic
Coalition	Vote share	Seat share	Difference	Difference²
Centre-right coalition	44.02	57.50	+13.48	181.71
Centre-left coalition	25.99	22.00	−3.99	15.92
Five Star Movement	15.55	14.00	−1.55	2.40
Action – Italia Viva	7.73	4.50	−3.23	10.43
SVP–PATT	0.41	1.00	+0.59	0.34
South calls North	0.99	0.50	−0.49	0.24
MAIE	0.48	0.50	+0.02	0.00
Others	4.83	0.00	−4.83	23.33
			TOTAL	234.37
			TOTAL /2	117.85
			√TOTAL /2	10.83

== Leaders' races ==
Coalition	Party	Name	Constituency	Votes	%	Position	Result
Centre-right	FdI	Giorgia Meloni	L'Aquila (C)	104,823	51.49	1st	Elected
Centre-right	Lega	Matteo Salvini	Apulia (S)			1st	Elected
Centre-right	FI	Silvio Berlusconi	Monza (S)	231,440	50.26	1st	Elected
Centre-right	NM	Maurizio Lupi	Lecco (C)	131,305	54.80	1st	Elected
Centre-left	PD	Enrico Letta	Veneto (C)			1st	Elected
Centre-left	AVS	Angelo Bonelli	Imola (C)	90,004	38.34	1st	Elected
Centre-left	+E	Emma Bonino	Rome (XIV) (S)	182,239	33.21	2nd	Not elected
Centre-left	IC	Luigi Di Maio	Fuorigrotta (C)	41,743	24.42	2nd	Not elected
Five Star Movement		Giuseppe Conte	Lombardy (C)			2nd	Elected
Action – Italia Viva		Carlo Calenda	Rome (XIV) (S)	77,211	14.07	3rd	Not elected
Action – Italia Viva		Carlo Calenda	Lazio (S)			1st	Elected
South calls North		Cateno De Luca	Catania (S)	60,067	14.44	3rd	Not elected

== Electorate demographics ==
Sociology of the electorate
Demographic	Centre-right	Centre-left	M5S	A–IV	Others	Turnout
Total vote	43.8%	26.1%	15.4%	7.8%	6.9%	63.8%
Sex
Men	48.6%	20.3%	15.2%	8.6%	7.3%	63.1%
Women	38.9%	32.0%	15.6%	6.9%	6.6%	58.5%
Age
18–34 years old	25.0%	37.9%	20.9%	8.5%	7.7%	57.3%
35–49 years old	49.6%	21.0%	17.4%	5.7%	6.3%	57.6%
50–64 years old	45.6%	22.5%	16.6%	6.9%	8.4%	65.2%
65 or older	51.9%	24.3%	8.8%	9.9%	5.1%	61.8%
Occupation
Student	19.1%	44.5%	24.8%	8.0%	3.6%	64.5%
Unemployed	43.5%	22.3%	23.5%	3.3%	7.4%	52.2%
Housewife	51.1%	19.9%	19.0%	5.4%	4.6%	63.0%
Blue-collar	56.5%	15.7%	16.4%	3.9%	7.5%	56.6%
White-collar	38.4%	30.7%	13.8%	10.8%	6.3%	67.2%
Self-employed	43.3%	16.0%	15.8%	7.5%	17.4%	70.0%
Manager	42.6%	28.2%	11.6%	12.3%	5.3%	74.1%
Retired	44.4%	30.5%	9.9%	9.0%	6.2%	59.9%
Education
Elementary school	53.8%	18.0%	16.7%	5.2%	6.3%	54.8%
High school	42.4%	25.5%	16.1%	7.4%	8.6%	64.2%
University	28.8%	40.7%	11.3%	14.3%	4.9%	71.1%
Economic condition
Lower	49.2%	14.4%	25.0%	3.4%	8.0%	50.6%
Middle-lower	50.1%	19.7%	18.2%	5.2%	6.8%	52.7%
Middle	41.7%	28.9%	14.0%	7.9%	7.5%	64.0%
Upper-middle	37.1%	32.6%	11.4%	11.5%	7.4%	71.7%
Upper	41.1%	34.8%	10.2%	11.7%	2.2%	72.5%
Source: Ipsos Italia

== See also ==
- Results of the 1996 Italian general election
