= 2022 Italian general election =

- 25 September 2022

400 seats in the Chamber (C) · 200 seats in the Senate (S) 201 seats needed for a majority in the Chamber 104 seats needed for a majority in the Senate
- Opinion polls
- Registered: 46,021,956 (C) · 45,210,950 (S)
- Turnout: 29,385,111 (C) · 63.85% (▼9.09 pp); 28,850,840 (S) · 63.81% (▼9.20 pp)
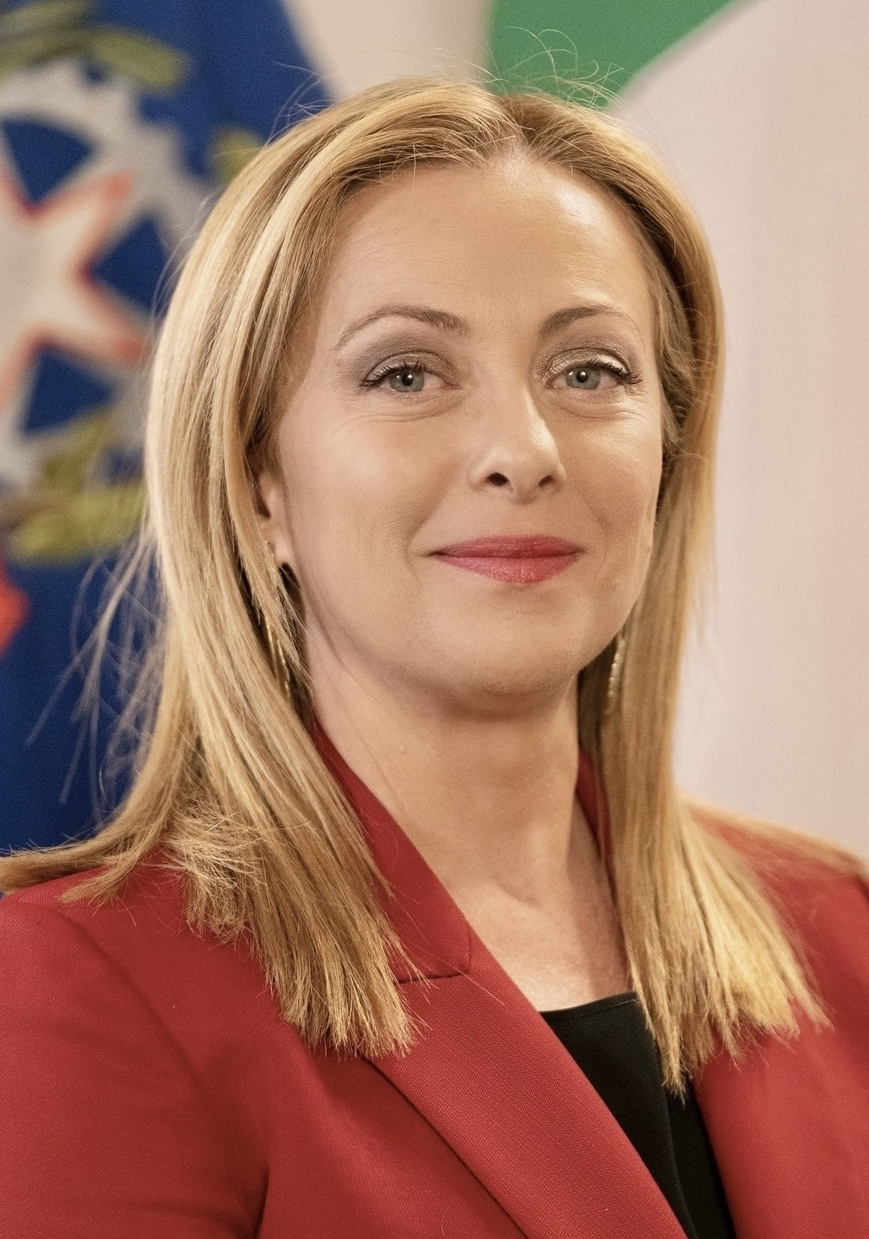

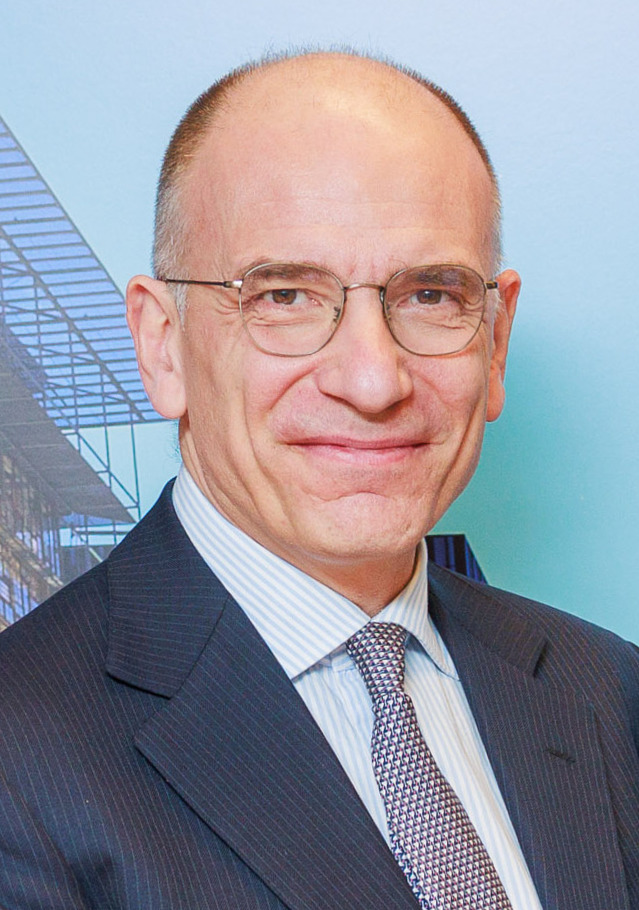

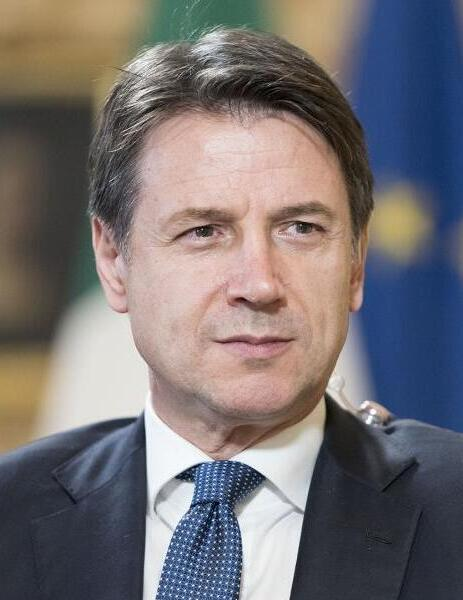

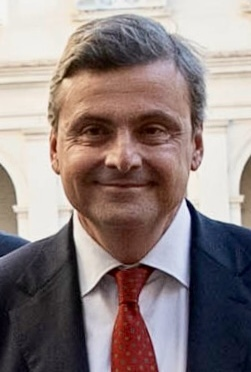
| | First party | Second party |
|---|---|---|
| Leader | Giorgia Meloni (Note: The coalition had not officially expressed a unitary leader before the election, having agreed that this should be the expression of the party with the highest number of votes; however, Giorgia Meloni was considered the leader of the coalition, given that her party was the favourite in the polls.) | Enrico Letta |
| Party | Brothers of Italy | Democratic Party |
| Alliance | Centre-right | Centre-left |
| Leader since | 27 July 2022 | 29 July 2022 |
| Leader's seat | L'Aquila (C) | Lombardy 1 (C) |
| Seats won | 237 (C) · 115 (S) | 84 (C) · 44 (S) |
| Popular vote | 12,305,014 (C); 12,135,847 (S) | 7,340,096 (C); 7,161,688 (S) |
| Percentage | 43.8% (C) · 44.0% (S) | 26.1% (C) · 26.0% (S) |
| Swing | ▲6.8 pp (C) ▲6.5 pp (S) | ▼0.2 pp (C) ▼0.3 pp (S) |
| | Third party | Fourth party |
| Leader | Giuseppe Conte | Carlo Calenda |
| Party | Five Star Movement | Action – Italia Viva |
| Alliance | – | – |
| Leader since | 6 August 2021 | 11 August 2022 |
| Leader's seat | Lombardy 1 (C) | Sicily (S) |
| Seats won | 52 (C) · 28 (S) | 21 (C) · 9 (S) |
| Popular vote | 4,333,972 (C); 4,285,894 (S) | 2,186,669 (C); 2,131,310 (S) |
| Percentage | 15.4% (C) · 15.6% (S) | 7.8% (C) · 7.7% (S) |
| Swing | ▼17.3 pp (C) ▼16.6 pp (S) | New |
- Election results maps by constituencies for the Chamber of Deputies (on the left) and for the Senate (on the right).
Prime Minister before election
Mario Draghi
Independent
Prime Minister after the election
Giorgia Meloni
Brothers of Italy

Early general elections were held in Italy on 25 September 2022. After the fall of the Draghi government, which led to a parliamentary impasse, President Sergio Mattarella dissolved Parliament on 21 July, and called for new elections. Regional elections in Sicily were held on the same day. The results of the general election showed the centre-right coalition led by Giorgia Meloni's Brothers of Italy, a national-conservative party, winning an absolute majority of seats in the Italian Parliament. Meloni was appointed Prime Minister of Italy on 22 October, becoming the first woman to hold the office.

In a record-low voter turnout, Meloni's party became the largest in Parliament with 26% of the vote; as per the pre-election agreement among the centre-right coalition parties, she became the prime ministerial candidate supported by the winning coalition. The League and Forza Italia suffered losses, polling 8% each, and Us Moderates polled below 1%. The centre-left coalition slightly improved its 2018 results in terms of vote share and seats in percentage with the Democratic Party polling 19% and the Greens and Left Alliance passing the 3% threshold; More Europe and Civic Commitment failed to reach the election threshold. The Five Star Movement defied single-digit polls before the campaign and reached 15%. The Action – Italia Viva alliance polled 7%. Among the others to be represented in Parliament were two regionalist parties: South calls North and the South Tyrolean People's Party. Due to the Rosatellum and its mixed electoral system using parallel voting, the centre-right coalition was able to win an absolute majority of seats, despite receiving 44% of the votes, by winning 83% of the single-member districts under the first-past-the-post of the system.

As a result of the 2020 Italian constitutional referendum, the size of Parliament was reduced to 400 members of the Chamber of Deputies and 200 members of the Senate of the Republic to be elected, down from 630 and 315, respectively. In addition, the minimum voting age for the Senate was the same as for the Chamber (18 years old and no longer 25), which marked the first time the two houses had identical electorates.

Observers commented that the results shifted the geopolitics of the European Union, following right wing populist and far-right gains in France, Spain, and Sweden. It was also noted that the election outcome would mark Italy's first far-right-led government and the country's most right-wing government since 1945. The newly elected legislature was seated on 13 October, and proceeded to elect Ignazio La Russa, a known admirer of Benito Mussolini, and Lorenzo Fontana, an opponent of same-sex marriage and transgender rights, as President of the Senate and of the Chamber of Deputies, respectively. The Meloni Cabinet was sworn in on 22 October, and received parliamentary approval through two votes of confidence (one in each House of Parliament) a few days thereafter.

== Background ==
In the 2018 Italian general election, held on 4 March, no political group or party won an outright majority, resulting in a hung parliament. The centre-right coalition, in which Matteo Salvini's League emerged as the main political force, won a plurality of seats in the Chamber of Deputies and in the Senate, while the anti-establishment Five Star Movement (M5S) led by Luigi Di Maio became the party with the largest number of votes. The centre-left coalition, led by Matteo Renzi of the governing Democratic Party (PD), came third. Due to the PD and centre-left's poor results, Renzi resigned on 12 March, his place being taken ad interim by Maurizio Martina.

The League continued the Italian nationalist turn it took into the 2018 general election. In October 2018, the League was founded as a sister party to promote Salvini's candidature as Prime Minister of Italy. Political commentators have since described it as a parallel party of the League, with the aim of politically replacing the latter, which had been burdened by a statutory debt of €49 million. The League's statute presented it as a nationalist and souverainist party. On 22 January 2020, four days before the regional elections, Di Maio resigned as the M5S leader, and was replaced ad interim by Vito Crimi.

As a result of the hung parliament, protracted negotiations were required before a new government could be formed. The talks between the M5S and League resulted in the proposal of the self-declared government of change under the leadership of Giuseppe Conte, a university law professor close to the M5S. After some bickering with President Sergio Mattarella, Conte's cabinet, which was dubbed by the media the "first all-populist government" in Western Europe, was sworn in on 1 June.

The 2019 European Parliament election was a win for the League, which obtained 34 percent of the vote and 20 seats, more than any other party in the country. In August 2019, Deputy Prime Minister Matteo Salvini announced a motion of no confidence against Conte after growing tensions within the majority. Many political analysts believe the no confidence motion was an attempt to force early elections to improve the League's standing in the Italian Parliament, ensuring Salvini could become the next prime minister. On 20 August, following the parliamentary debate in which he accused Salvini of being a political opportunist who "had triggered the political crisis only to serve his personal interest", Prime Minister Conte resigned his post to President Mattarella. Meanwhile, the M5S started a decline in both opinion polls, deputies and senators, and election results, starting with the 2019 European Parliament election. After the meagre results, Di Maio won a vote of confidence in his leadership and pledged to reform the party. In the general election held in March 2018, the M5S had won 227 deputies and 112 senators; by February 2022, the party had declined to 157 deputies and 62 senators, though it remained the biggest party in the parliament.

On 21 August President Mattarella started the consultations with all the parliamentary groups. On the same day, the national direction of the PD officially opened to a cabinet with the M5S, based on pro-Europeanism, a green economy, sustainable development, the fight against economic inequality, and a new immigration policy. As the talks resulted in an unclear outcome, President Mattarella announced a second round of consultation for 27 or 28 August. In the days that preceded the second round, a confrontation between the PD and the M5S started, while the left-wing parliamentary group LeU announced its support for a potential M5S–PD cabinet. On 28 August, the PD's newly elected secretary Nicola Zingaretti announced at the Quirinal Palace his favourable position on forming a new government with the M5S, with Conte at its head. On the same day, Mattarella summoned Conte to the Quirinal Palace for 29 August to give him the task of forming a new cabinet. On 3 September, members of the M5S voted on the Rousseau platform in favour of an agreement with the PD under the premiership of Conte, with more than 79% of votes out of nearly 80,000 voters. On 4 September, Conte announced the ministers of his new cabinet, which was sworn in at the Quirinal Palace on the following day. On 18 September, Renzi left the PD to found the liberal party Italia Viva (IV); he then joined the government with IV to keep the League and Salvini out of power.

In October 2019 Parliament approved the Fraccaro Reform, named after Riccardo Fraccaro, the M5S deputy who was the bill's first signatory. The fourth and final vote in the Chamber of Deputies came on 8 October 2019, with 553 votes in favour and 14 against. In the final vote, the bill was supported by both the majority and the opposition; only the liberal party More Europe (+E) and other small groups voted against. The reform provided a cut in the number of MPs, which would shrink from 630 to 400 deputies and from 315 to 200 senators. On 20–21 September 2020, Italians largely approved the reform with nearly 70% of votes through a constitutional referendum.

In January 2020, Italy became one of the countries worst affected by the COVID-19 pandemic. Conte's government was the first in the Western world to implement a national lockdown to stop the spread of the disease. Despite being widely approved by public opinion, the lockdown was also described as the largest suppression of constitutional rights in the history of the Italian Republic. In January 2021, Renzi's party Italia Viva withdrew its support for Conte's government, starting a government crisis. Although Conte was able to win confidence votes in Parliament in the subsequent days, he chose to resign due to failing to reach an absolute majority in the Senate. After negotiations to form a third Conte cabinet failed, Mario Draghi, the former president of the European Central Bank, became prime minister on 13 February at the head of a national unity government composed of independent technocrats and politicians from the League, M5S, PD, FI, IV, and LeU. Giorgia Meloni's Brothers of Italy (FdI) was the sole main party at the opposition.

In March 2021, the PD's secretary Zingaretti resigned after growing tensions within the PD, with the party's minority accusing him for the management of the government crisis. Many prominent members of the party asked to former prime minister Enrico Letta to become the new leader; on 14 March, he was elected as the new secretary by the PD's national assembly. In August 2021, Conte was elected president of the M5S. In February 2022, a Naples' court ruled in favour of three M5S activists, suspending Conte's presidency. On 19 February, Conte appealed to the court's decision, on the grounds that he was not aware of the 2018 party statute, which provided for the exclusion from voting of those who had joined the M5S for less than six months, and the voting procedure was valid.

In the Italian presidential election held in late January 2022, President Mattarella was re-elected, despite having ruled out a second term, after the governing parties asked him to do so when no other candidate was viable.

The 2022 Russian invasion of Ukraine sent shockwave through the Italian political spectrum: Prime Minister Draghi immediately pledged support for Ukraine and was rapidly joined in this by the Democratic Party and Brothers of Italy (which abandoned its pro-Russian views and adopted an atlanticist line): on 18 March the Chamber of Deputies overwhelmingly approved the sending of military aid to Ukraine, followed by the Senate on 31 March 2022. Despite having voted in favour of military aid, the Five Star Movement, the League and Forza Italia later became increasingly critical of support to Ukraine, causing tensions in the majority.

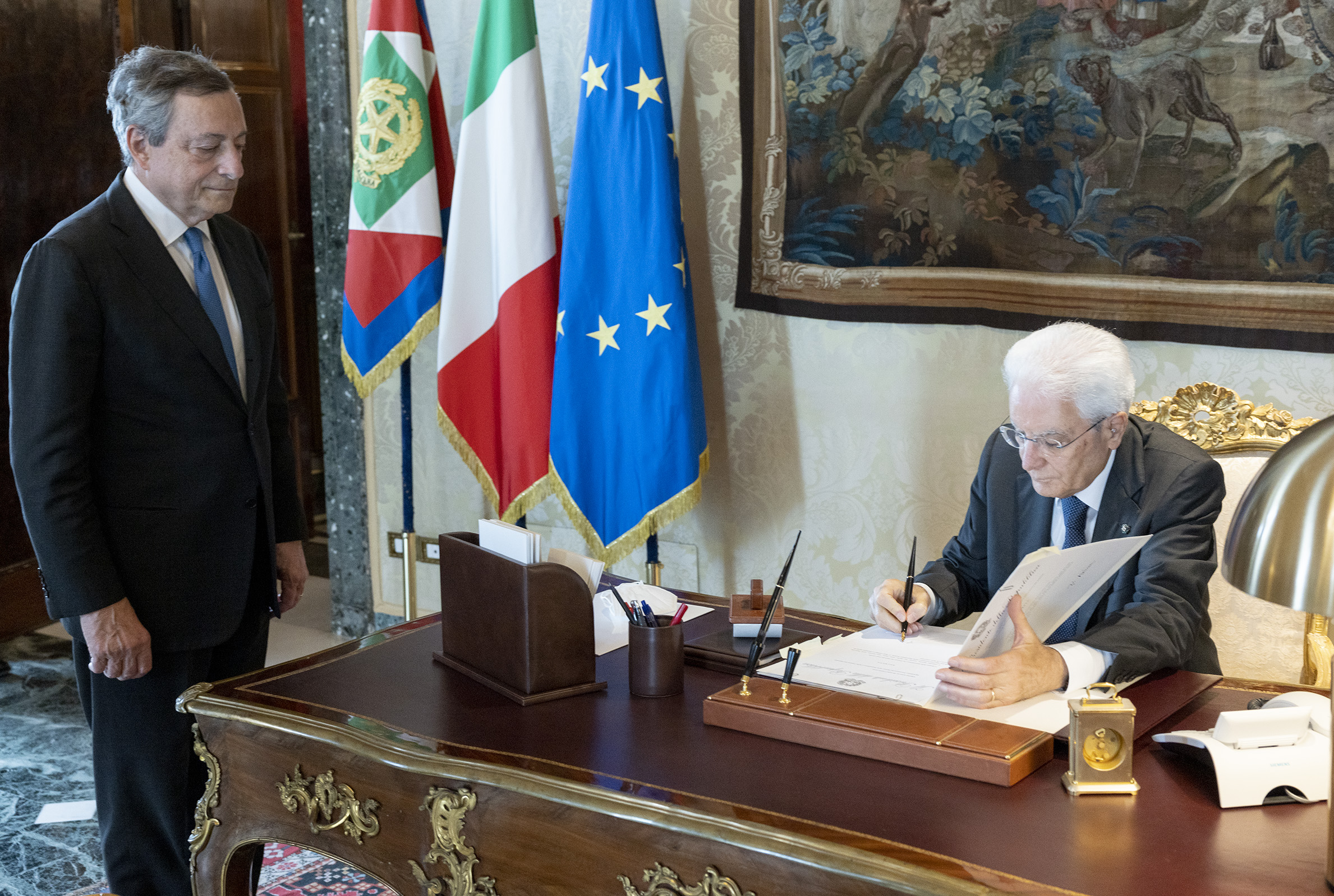
President Mattarella dissolved the Italian Parliament following Draghi's resignation.

During summer 2022, rumours arose that M5S might withdraw its support of the national unity government, including allegations that Draghi privately criticised Conte and asked M5S founder Beppe Grillo to replace him. This came amid tension between the M5S and the Draghi government on economic and environmental issues, and the Russo-Ukrainian War, which also caused a split within the M5S. In June 2022, Di Maio formed Together for the Future (IpF), which continued to support the Draghi government.

On 12 July, Draghi stated he would resign if the M5S withdraws its support to the government. On 14 July, the M5S eventually revoked the support to the government of national unity regarding a decree concerning economic stimulus to contrast the 2021 energy crisis. On the same day, Draghi resigned; his resignation was rejected by Mattarella. On 21 July, Draghi resigned again after a new confidence vote in the Senate failed to pass with an absolute majority, following defections of the M5S, the League, and FI. Mattarella accepted Draghi's resignation and asked him to remain in place to handle current affairs. On the following day, Mattarella officially dissolved the parliament and the snap election was called for 25 September 2022.

== Electoral campaign ==
Following the dissolution of Parliament, the electoral campaign officially began. Within the centre-left coalition, the Democratic Party (PD) secretary Enrico Letta ruled out an alliance with Giuseppe Conte's Five Star Movement (M5S), which he had always advocated in the previous months. Letta said that the government crisis brought an "irreversible break" between the two parties. Conte accused Letta of being "arrogant and hypocritical", and the League and Forza Italia (FI) of "having bullied" M5S "in front of the nation", adding that M5S would run alone in this election. Conte and M5S declared themselves to be part of the progressive pole and to the left of PD; their campaign centered around the minimum wage and in defense of the citizens' income against right-wing criticism. Letta criticised M5S for their past government with the League and anti-immigration measures. PD ran for a wealth tax, minimum wage, support for civil rights such as egalitarian marriage, a law protecting against sexual orientation discrimination (DDL Zan), ius scholae reform to allow children of immigrants who live and study in Italy to apply for citizenship, cannabis legalization, defense of the Constitution of Italy as an anti-fascist document, and on the lesser of two evils as the only coalition that could beat the right, in large part due the electoral law, which Letta defined as the worst ever made.

On 26 July, Italian Left (SI) and Green Europe (EV) officially launched their joint list for the upcoming election within the centre-left coalition, named Greens and Left Alliance (AVS). After a few days, Angelo Bonelli was appointed political leader of the alliance on a eco-socialist platform. To their left, Power to the People (PaP), Communist Refoundation Party (PRC), and other minor left-wing and regionalist parties formed the People's Union (UP) coalition led by Luigi de Magistris, a former magistrate and mayor of Naples, on an anti-neoliberal platform. On 27 July, Letta announced that Article One (Art.1), the Italian Socialist Party (PSI), and Solidary Democracy (DemoS) would run within PD's list, while Carlo Calenda, leader of Action (A), revealed that Mariastella Gelmini and Mara Carfagna had joined his party and would run in the upcoming election. Gelmini and Carfagna were both ministers and long-time members of FI, who left Silvio Berlusconi's party after the fall of the Draghi government.

On 28 July, the centre-right coalition, formed by Lega, FI, Brothers of Italy (FdI), Union of the Centre (UdC), Coraggio Italia (CI), and Us with Italy (NcI), found an agreement on the distribution of single-member districts between the allies and agreed also on the candidate for the premiership, which would be proposed by the party that gains more votes. They campaigned on the flat tax, constitutional reforms like presidentialism, welfare cuts, and citizen's income reform, though the three main parties and leaders had their differences, and their manifesto lacked details. Due to its strong showing in opinion polls, Giorgia Meloni's FdI gained 98 candidacies, Lega 70, FI–UdC 42, and NcI and CI 11. Meloni ran a campaign around the "God, country and family" slogan, downplayed FdI's post-fascist roots, and sought to promote her party as being mainstream conservative.

On 29 July, the campaign was marked by the murder of Alika Ogorchukwu, a Nigerian migrant who was killed with bare hands and crutches by an Italian man in a street in Civitanova Marche. The murderer, a 32-year-old Italian, said that he acted because Ogorchukwu had been begging insistently. The murder was filmed by passers-by and made the front page of Italian newspapers on 29 July. The political class expressed its indignation following the murder, and the left and the right accused each other: the progressive parties and several commentators accused the right of spreading racist propaganda, while the right-wing parties accused the left of appropriating the murder.

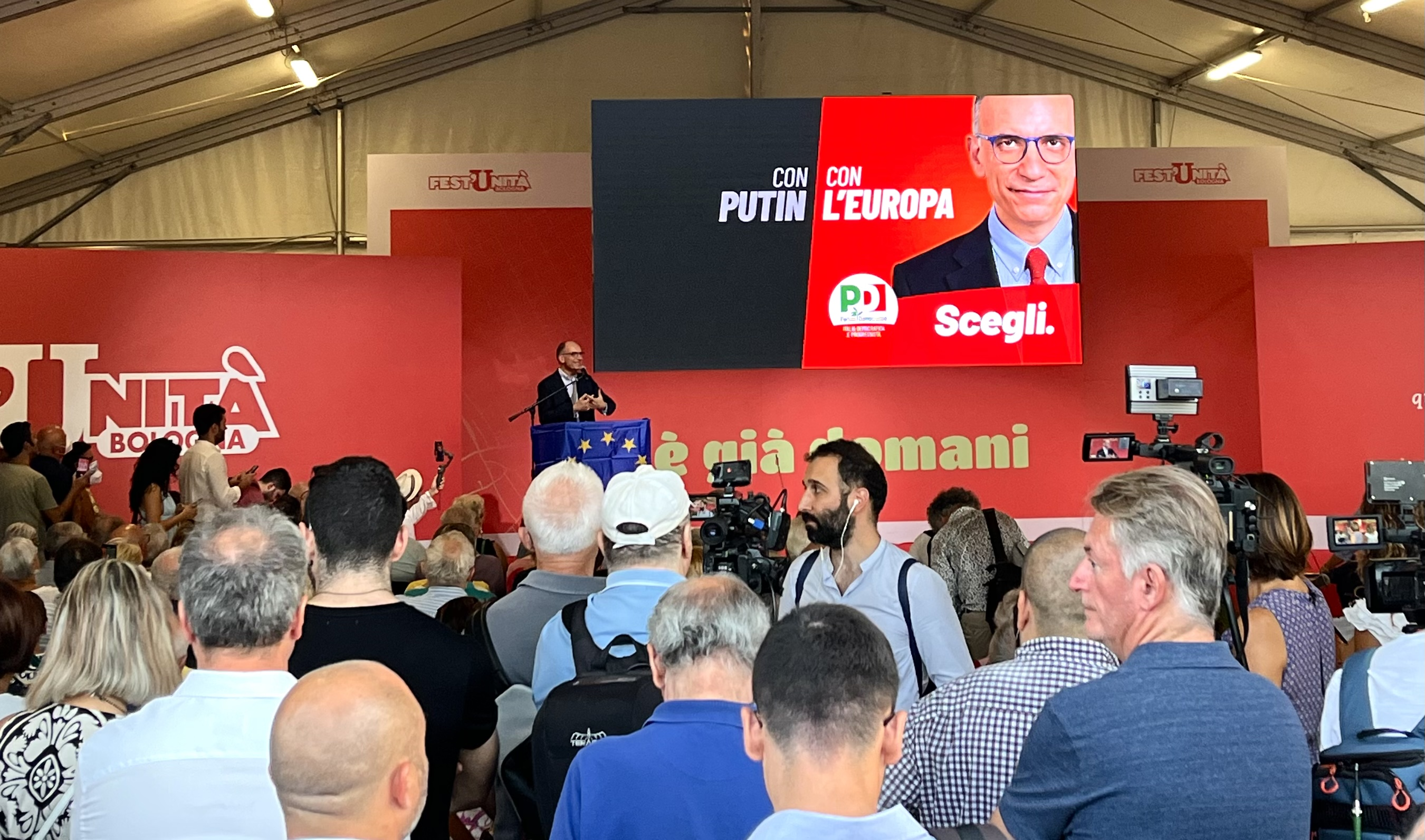
Enrico Letta opening the campaign at Festa de l'Unità of Bologna

On 1 August, Luigi Di Maio and Bruno Tabacci presented their new party, Civic Commitment (IC), a centrist electoral list mainly composed by former members of M5S, which would be part of the centre-left coalition. Moreover, Marco Rizzo's Communist Party (PC), Antonio Ingroia's Civil Action (AC), and other minor populist and hard Eurosceptic parties launched Sovereign and Popular Italy (ISP), dubbed by the media as a red–brown alliance between left-wing and right-wing movements. On the same day, Gianluigi Paragone's Italexit and Pino Cabras's Alternative officially announced the formation of a Eurosceptic joint list, proposing the candidacies of several anti-vaccination and anti-lockdown activists. Four days later, Alternativa dissolved the alliance due to allegations about the presence of neofascist candidates within Italexit's lists, following an agreement between Paragone's party and CasaPound (CP).

On 2 August, Letta's PD signed an alliance with Calenda's Action party and Benedetto Della Vedova's More Europe (+E). On 6 August, PD signed another pact with AVS and IC. These alliances caused tensions between Letta and Calenda. The latter, being a strong supporter of economic liberalism and nuclear power, considered impossible a coalition between his own party and AVS. On 7 August, Calenda broke the alliance with PD. +E, led by Della Vedova and Emma Bonino, decided to remain in the centre-left coalition with PD, marking the end of the federation between them and Calenda's party. On 11 August, Matteo Renzi's Italia Viva (IV) and A signed an agreement to create a centrist alliance led by Calenda, using IV's symbol to avoid collecting signatures for Calenda's party. Despite Draghi's dismissal, Calenda and Renzi said they would push for Draghi to remain as prime minister, should they win enough seats. They also ran a pro-nuclear power and pro-regasification campaign as solutions for the ongoing energy crisis.

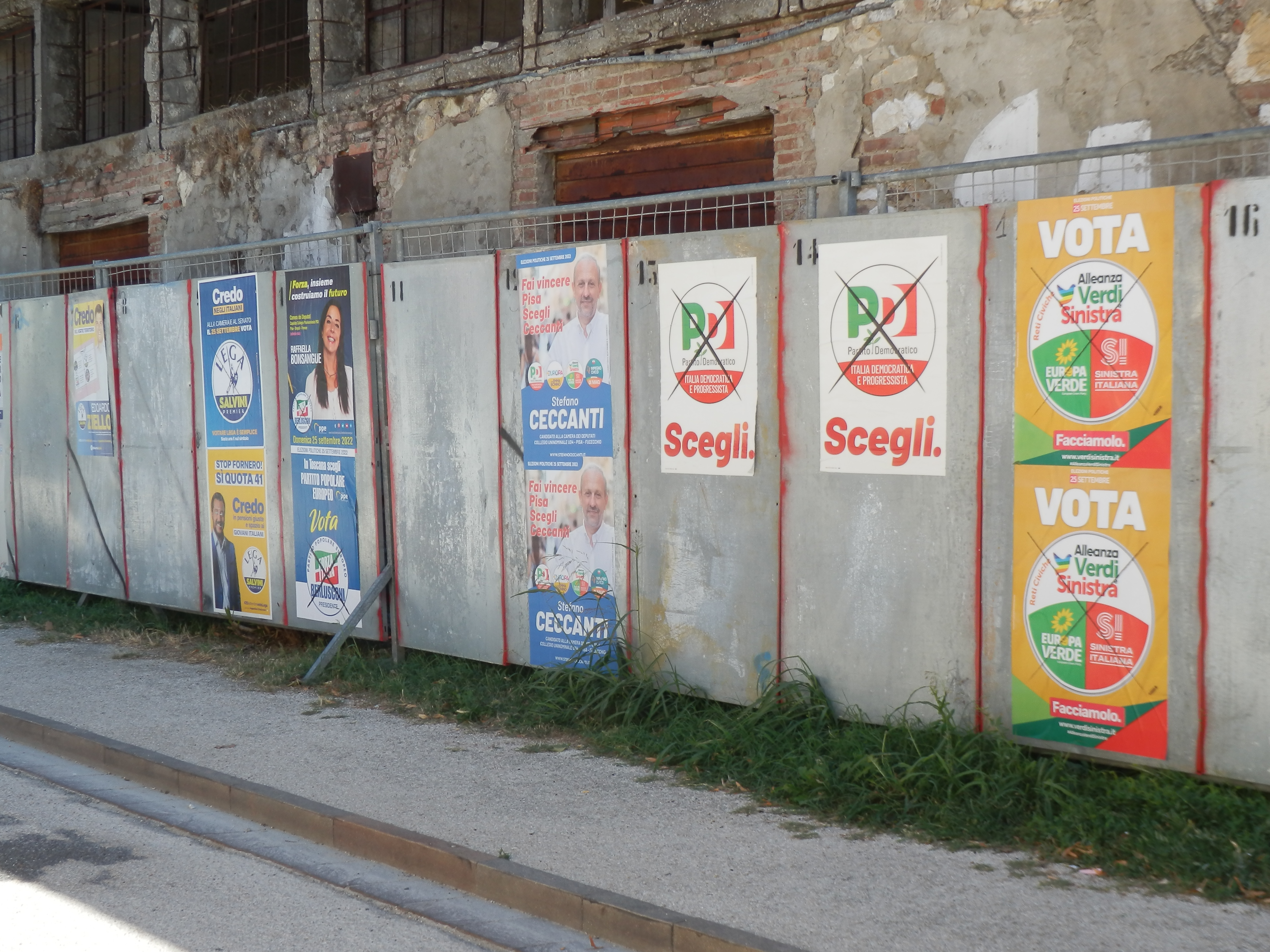
Electoral posters in Cascina, Tuscany

On 22 August, Meloni tweeted a video of a rape committed by a 27-year-old Guinean asylum seeker against a 55-year-old Ukrainian woman in the city of Piacenza, Emilia-Romagna. Letta immediately labeled Meloni as "indecent", adding that "the Italian right-wing has no respect for the victim, not caring about her rights", while Calenda stated that Meloni should be ashamed of herself. Meloni accused Letta of lying, saying that the video was taken from the official website of the newspaper Il Messaggero, adding that she did not have to apologize because it was done for solidarity with the victim. On 24 August, the rape victim stated that she was desperate for having been recognized by someone in the video of the attack. On the same day, the video was removed by Twitter, Facebook, and Instagram due to violations of the social media's policies.

On 5 September, when asked about his opinions on the Italian election, former United States president Donald Trump endorsed Conte, whom he defined as "a very good person", stating that he hoped he would "do well" and adding that the two had "worked very well" together back when Conte was prime minister. On the same day, a League councillor from Florence caused some controversy when he filmed a video saying that a vote for the League would be a vote to deport Roma people. On 8 September, Letta was criticised by Meloni after he stated, at the annual meeting of the Ambrosetti Forum in Cernobbio, that "with the right's victory, Italy could become a B-class European country like Poland and Hungary." His statements were also criticised by the Polish ambassador to Italy, Anna Maria Anders. On 9 September, Federico Mollicone, senior member of FdI, was criticised after he demanded for a Peppa Pig episode briefly showing a lesbian couple to be censored. On 20 September, FdI sacked Calogero Pisano, a member and candidate that openly praised Adolf Hitler; in an audio message, he expected to only be suspended for a few days. While he remained a candidate, FdI removed its symbol from his candidature. He was elected in the single-district constituency of Agrigento, Sicilia, with 37.8% of the vote.

On 23 September, the centre-right coalition held a large rally in Rome, with closing statements and remarks from the main leaders of the alliance. On the same day, the other main coalitions and their leaders (PD, M5S, and A–IV) held their final rallies. On the day before the election, Ursula von der Leyen, the president of the European Commission, was asked about possible Vladimir Putin allies in the Italian political system and the upcoming election, to which she replied that "if things go in a difficult direction, I've spoken about Hungary and Poland, we have tools." The comment garnered a strong backlash from some Italian politicians, especially from Salvini and Renzi. According to Italian law, election silence was enforced over all the national territory on 24 September.

=== Main parties' slogans ===
| Party | Original slogan | English translation | Ref. |
|---|---|---|---|
| League | Credo | "I Believe" | |
| Five Star Movement | Dalla parte giusta | "On the Right Side" | |
| Democratic Party – IDP | Scegli | "Choose" | |
| Forza Italia | Una scelta di campo | "A Choice of Field" | |
| Civic Commitment | Difendiamo la libertà | "We Defend Freedom" | |
| Action – Italia Viva | L'Italia, sul serio | "Italy, Seriously" | |
| Brothers of Italy | Pronti a risollevare l'Italia | "Ready to Revive Italy" | |
| Us Moderates | Noi, i moderati di centrodestra | "Us, the Centre-Right Moderates" | |
| Greens and Left Alliance | Facciamolo | "Let's Do It" | |
| Italexit for Italy | Per l'Italia che non molla mai | "For the Italy that Never Gives Up" | |
| People's Union | L'Italia di cui abbiamo bisogno | "The Italy that We Need" | |
| More Europe | Una generazione avanti | "A Generation Ahead" | |
| Sovereign and Popular Italy | Torniamo alla Costituzione | "Let's Go Back to the Constitution" | |
| South Tyrolean People's Party – PATT | Jetzt mehr denn je, Autonomie wählen (Note: Italian: Ora più che mai, scegli l'autonomia) | "Now More than Ever, Choose Autonomy" | |

=== Electoral debates ===
Differently from many other Western countries, electoral debates between parties' leaders are not so common before general elections in Italy; the last debate between the two main candidates to prime ministry dated back to the 2006 Italian general election between Silvio Berlusconi and Romano Prodi. With few exceptions, almost every main political leader had denied his participation to an electoral debate with other candidates, preferring interviews with TV hosts and journalists, while many debates took place between other leading members of the main parties.

The 2022 election saw the first debates between the main leaders in 16 years. On 23 August, some prominent leaders of the centre-right (Meloni, Salvini, Tajani, and Lupi) and of the centre-left (Letta and Di Maio) were jointly interviewed by Luciano Fontana during the Rimini Meeting, organized by the Catholic movement Communion and Liberation. Moreover, Fontana also interviewed the main parties' leaders at the Ambrosetti Forum on 4 September, and hosted a debate between Letta and Meloni on the website of Corriere della Sera, the newspaper of which he serves as director.

2022 Italian general election debates
| Date | Organiser | Moderator | P Present I Invitee NI Non-invitee A Absent invitee | | | | | |
| Date | Organiser | Moderator | Centre-right | Centre-left | M5S | A–IV | Italexit | UP |
|---|---|---|---|---|---|---|---|---|
| 8 August | La7 (La Corsa al Voto) | Paolo Celata; Alessandro De Angelis | NI | NI | NI | NI | P Paragone | P de Magistris |
| 23 August | Communion and Liberation (Rimini Meeting) | Luciano Fontana | P Meloni (FdI); Salvini (Lega); Tajani (FI); Lupi (NM) | P Letta (PD); Di Maio (IC) | NI | P Rosato (IV) | NI | NI |
| 4 September | The European House – Ambrosetti (Ambrosetti Forum) | Luciano Fontana | P Meloni (FdI); Salvini (Lega); Tajani (FI) | P Letta (PD) | P Conte | P Calenda (A) | NI | NI |
| 12 September | Corriere.it | Luciano Fontana | P Meloni (FdI) | P Letta (PD) | NI | NI | NI | NI |

== Electoral system ==
After the 2020 Italian constitutional referendum, which reduced members of Parliament from 630 to 400 in the Chamber of Deputies and from 315 to 200 in the Senate of the Republic, the Italian electoral law of 2017 (Rosatellum), used in the 2018 Italian general election, was initially expected by the then Conte II Cabinet to be either replaced entirely or its single-member districts under first-past-the-post (FPTP) be redesigned. By August 2022, the electoral reform was bogged down in the Chamber's Constitutional Affairs Commission and a proposal by M5S deputy Giuseppe Brescia had been presented to the Italian Parliament but by that time it was already dissolved for snap elections. Single-member district changes were approved and published on 30 December 2020 in Gazzetta Ufficiale, the Italian government gazette. The Chamber was reduced from 232 to 147 districts, and Senate districts were reduced from 116 to 74.

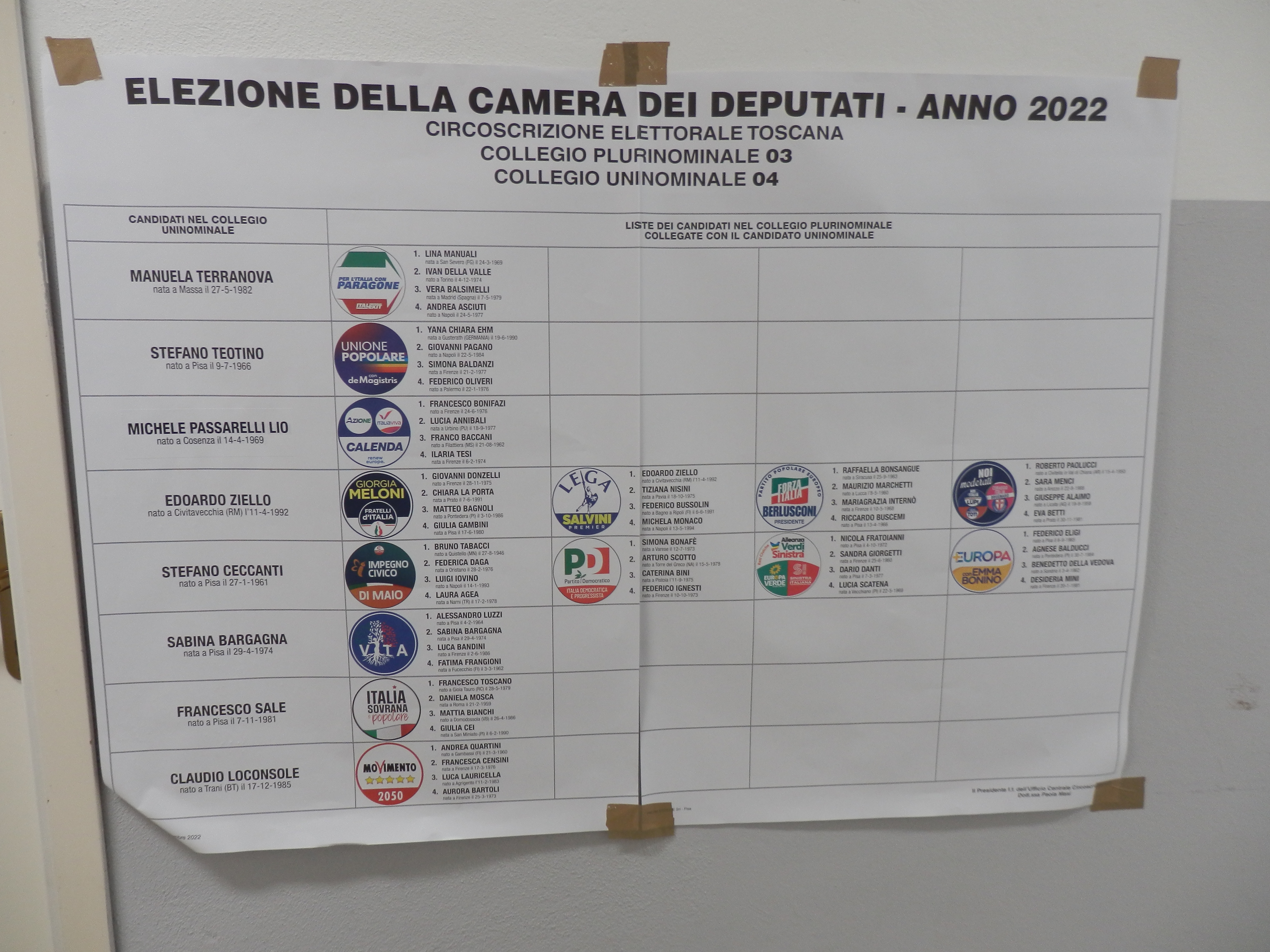
Lists of candidates in a polling station

The 400 deputies are to be elected, using mixed-member majoritarian representation, as follows:

- 147 in single-member constituencies by plurality (FPTP).
- 245 in multi-member constituencies by national proportional representation.
- 8 in multi-member abroad constituencies by constituency proportional representation.

The 200 elective senators, also using mixed-member majoritarian representation, are to be elected as follows:

- 74 in single-member constituencies by plurality (FPTP).
- 122 in multi-member constituencies by regional proportional representation.
- 4 in single-member abroad constituencies by plurality (FPTP).

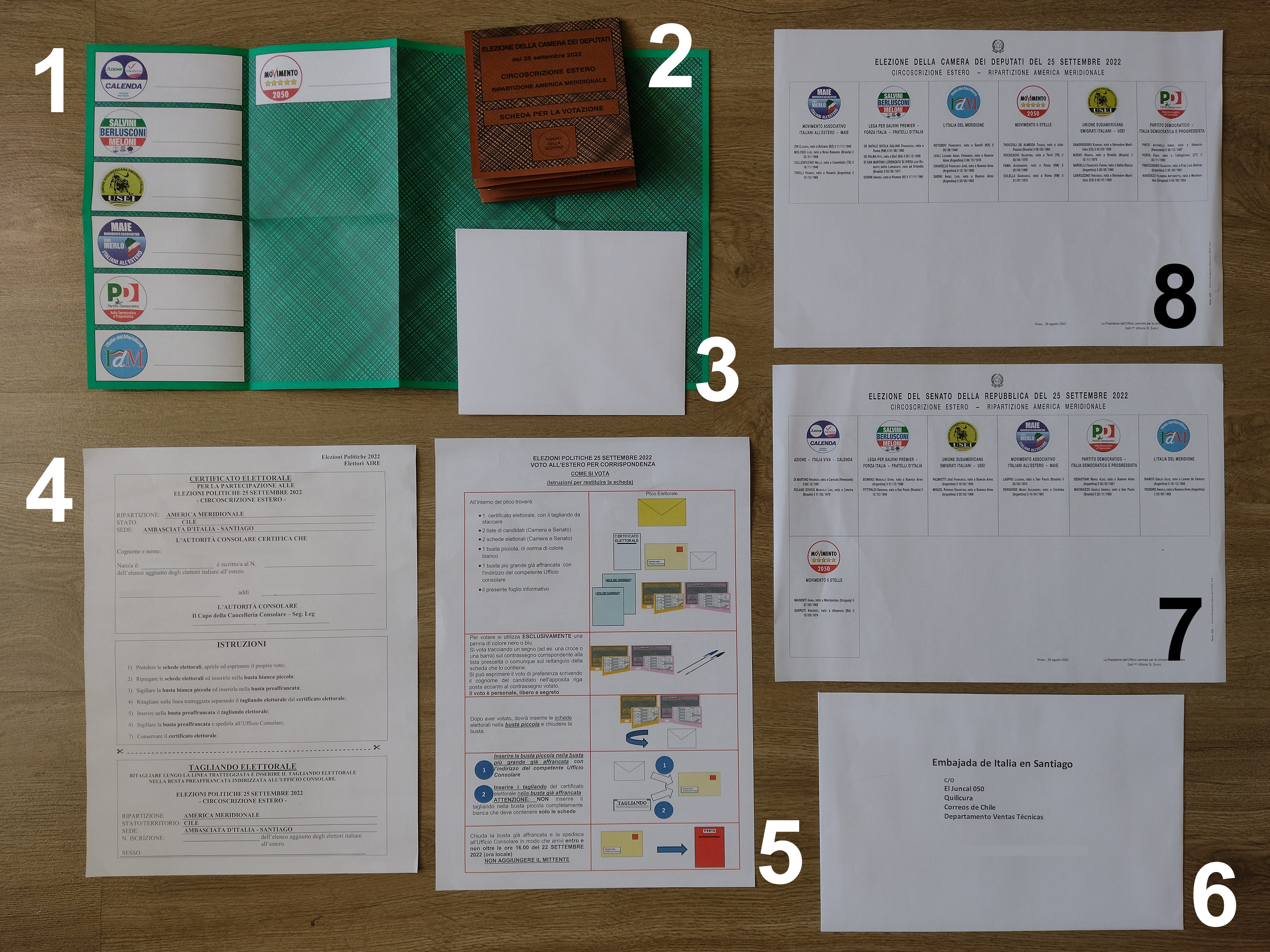
Electoral package sent to an Italian voter in South America

For Italian residents, each house member is to be elected in single ballots, including the constituency candidate and their supporting party lists. In each single-member constituency, the deputy or senator is elected on a plurality basis, while the seats in multi-member constituencies are allocated nationally. In order to be calculated in single-member constituency results, parties need to obtain at least 1% of the national vote and be part of a coalition obtaining at least 10% of the national vote. In order to receive seats in multi-member constituencies, parties need to obtain at least 3% of the national vote. Elects from multi-member constituencies would come from closed lists.

The voting paper, which is a single one for the FPTP and the proportional systems, shows the names of the candidates to single-member constituencies and in close conjunction with them the symbols of the linked lists for the proportional part, each one with a list of the relative candidates. The voter is able to cast their vote in three different ways, among them:

- Drawing a sign on the symbol of a list. In this case, the vote extends to the candidate in the single-member constituency that is supported by that list.
- Drawing a sign on the name of the candidate of the single-member constituency and another one on the symbol of one list that supports them; the result is the same as that described above. Under penalty of annulment, the panachage is not allowed, so the voter cannot vote simultaneously for a candidate in the FPTP constituency and for a list which is not linked to them.
- Drawing a sign only on the name of the candidate for the FPTP constituency, without indicating any list. In this case, the vote is valid for the candidate in the single-member constituency and also automatically extended to the list that supports them; however, if that candidate is connected to several lists, the vote is divided proportionally between them, based on the votes that each one has obtained in that constituency.

== Electoral lists ==
=== Lists with parliamentary representation ===
Below are the main electoral lists that are running in the election.

| Coalition | List | Main ideology | Leader | Contested constituencies | | Seats at last election | | | Seats at dissolution | | |
| Coalition | List | Main ideology | Leader | C | S | C | S | Total | C | S | Total |
|---|---|---|---|---|---|---|---|---|---|---|---|
| Centre-right coalition | League (Lega) (Note: Including Sardinian Action Party (PSd'Az), Fassa Association (AF), and Italian Liberal Right (DLI)) | Right-wing populism | Matteo Salvini | 28 | 20 | 125 | 58 | 183 | 131 | 60 | 191 |
| Centre-right coalition | Forza Italia (FI) (Note: Including New Italian Socialist Party (NPSI) and Animalist Movement (MA)) | Liberal conservatism | Silvio Berlusconi | 28 | 20 | 104 | 57 | 161 | 68 | 47 | 115 |
| Centre-right coalition | Brothers of Italy (FdI) (Note: Including also Green is Popular (VèP), Human Value Party (PVU), and Diventerà Bellissima (DB)) | National conservatism | Giorgia Meloni | 28 | 20 | 32 | 18 | 50 | 40 | 21 | 61 |
| Centre-right coalition | Us Moderates (NM) (Note: List composed of Us with Italy (NcI), Italy in the Centre (IaC), Coraggio Italia (CI), and Union of the Centre (UdC); including also Renaissance and Party of Europeans and Liberals (PEL)) | Liberal conservatism Christian democracy | Maurizio Lupi | 28 | 20 | 3 | 3 | 6 | 23 | 12 | 35 |
| Centre-left coalition | Democratic Party – IDP (PD–IDP) (Note: Electoral list of the Democratic Party also including Article One (Art.1), Italian Socialist Party (PSI), Solidary Democracy (DemoS), Centrists for Europe (CpE), European Republicans Movement (MRE), Italian Base (BASE), Volt Italy (Volt), Green Italia (GI), èViva, and other local lists) | Social democracy | Enrico Letta | 28 | 20 | 120 | 55 | 175 | 106 | 43 | 149 |
| Centre-left coalition | Civic Commitment (IC) (Note: List composed of Together for the Future (IpF), Democratic Centre (CD), Ambiente 2050, and Innovative Democratic Socialist Proposal (PSDI)) | Centrism | Luigi Di Maio | 27 | 18 | —N/a | —N/a | —N/a | 50 | 11 | 61 |
| Centre-left coalition | Greens and Left Alliance (AVS) (Note: List composed of Italian Left (SI) and Green Europe (EV), also including Possible (Pos), Greens of South Tyrol (Grüne), and Sardinian Progressives (PS)) | Green politics Democratic socialism | Angelo Bonelli | 27 | 19 | —N/a | —N/a | —N/a | 6 | 1 | 7 |
| Centre-left coalition | More Europe (+E) (Note: Including Forza Europa (FE) and Team K (TK)) | Liberalism | Emma Bonino | 27 | 19 | 3 | 1 | 4 | 1 | 1 | 2 |
| Five Star Movement (M5S) (Note: Including Gay Party (PG)) | | Populism | Giuseppe Conte | 28 | 20 | 227 | 112 | 339 | 96 | 62 | 158 |
| Action – Italia Viva (A–IV) (Note: List composed of Action (A) and Italia Viva (IV), also including Good Right (BD), Italian Republican Party (PRI), Liberal Democratic Alliance for Italy (ALI), Together (I), Popular Apulia (PP), and Christian Democracy (DC)) | | Liberalism | Carlo Calenda | 28 | 20 | —N/a | —N/a | —N/a | 46 | 19 | 65 |
| South Tyrolean People's Party – PATT (SVP–PATT) (Note: Including Trentino Project (PT)) | | Regionalism | Philipp Achammer | 1 | 1 | 4 | 3 | 7 | 3 | 3 | 6 |
| People's Union (UP) (Note: List composed of Democracy and Autonomy (DemA), Communist Refoundation Party (PRC), Power to the People (PaP), ManifestA, Risorgimento Socialista (RS), and Party of the South (PdS)) | | Left-wing populism | Luigi de Magistris | 28 | 20 | —N/a | —N/a | —N/a | 4 | 2 | 6 |
| Italexit for Italy (Italexit) (Note: Including members of CasaPound (CP) and Vox Italia (Vox)) | | Anti-establishment | Gianluigi Paragone | 26 | 17 | —N/a | —N/a | —N/a | 1 | 4 | 5 |
| Sovereign and Popular Italy (ISP) (Note: List composed of Communist Party (PC), Civil Action (AC), Reconquer Italy (RI), Italy Again (AI), Italy United (IU), and Socialist Homeland (PS)) | | Anti-establishment | Giovanna Colone | 28 | 19 | —N/a | —N/a | —N/a | —N/a | 2 | 2 |
| Us of the Centre – Europeanists (NDC–Eu) (Note: Including Christian Democracy (DC) and New Horizons for Italy (NOI)) | | Christian democracy | Raffaele Fantetti | 13 | 9 | —N/a | —N/a | —N/a | —N/a | 2 | 2 |
| Vita (V) (Note: List composed of R2020, 3V Movement (M3V), Sentinels of the Constitution (SdC), Stop 5G Italian Alliance (S5GIA), Popular Union for free Italy (UPIL) and ENZIAN-Südtirol) | | Anti-establishment | Sara Cunial | 20 | 17 | —N/a | —N/a | —N/a | 1 | —N/a | 1 |

=== Lists without parliamentary representation ===
| List | Main ideology | Leader | Contested constituencies | |
| List | Main ideology | Leader | C | S |
|---|---|---|---|---|
| Alternative for Italy (APLI) (Note: List composed of The People of the Family (PdF) and Exit (E)) | Right-wing populism | Mario Adinolfi | 7 | 10 |
| Italian Communist Party (PCI) | Communism | Mauro Alboresi | 6 | 8 |
| South calls North (ScN) | Regionalism | Cateno De Luca | 5 | 3 |
| Animalist Party – UCDL – 10 Times Better (PAI–UCDL–10VM) | Animal rights | Cristiano Ceriello | 3 | 2 |
| Force of the People (FdP) | Anti-vaccination | Lillo Massimiliano Musso | 1 | 1 |
| Die Freiheitlichen (dF) | Separatism | Otto Mahlknecht | —N/a | 1 |
| For Autonomy (PA) | Autonomism | Augusto Rollandin | —N/a | 1 |
| Free (F) | Populism | Marco Lusetti | 1 | —N/a |
| Party of Creative Madness (PFC) | Political satire | Giuseppe Cirillo | 1 | —N/a |
| Team K (TK) | Regionalism | Paul Köllensperger | —N/a | 1 |
| United Right – Royal Italy (DU–IR) | Nationalism | Massimiliano Panero | —N/a | 1 |
| The Valdostan Renaissance (LRV) | Regionalism | Giovanni Girardini | 1 | —N/a |
| Workers' Communist Party (PCL) | Trotskyism | Marco Ferrando | —N/a | 1 |

=== Lists running only in overseas constituencies ===
| List | Main ideology | Leader | Contested constituencies | | Seats at last election | | | Seats before election | | |
| List | Main ideology | Leader | C | S | C | S | Total | C | S | Total |
|---|---|---|---|---|---|---|---|---|---|---|
| Associative Movement of Italians Abroad (MAIE) | Interests of Italians abroad | Ricardo Merlo | 2 | 2 | 1 | 1 | 2 | 3 | 1 | 4 |
| South American Union of Italian Emigrants (USEI) | Interests of Italians in South America | Eugenio Sangregorio | 1 | 1 | 1 | 1 | 2 | 1 | —N/a | 1 |
| Italy of the South (IdM) | Interests of Italians in South America | Vincenzo Castellano | 1 | 1 | —N/a | —N/a | —N/a | —N/a | —N/a | —N/a |
| Movement of Freedoms (MdL) | Interests of Italians in Europe | Massimo Romagnoli | 1 | 1 | —N/a | —N/a | —N/a | —N/a | —N/a | —N/a |

== Opinion polls ==
Local regression trend line of poll results from 4 March 2018 to the election day, with each line corresponding to the 2022 general election party lists

Since July 2022, when the snap election was first called, Brothers of Italy (FdI) was expected to become the first party, having surged as the opposition during the national unity government, and it became more likely as the election drew near. Also in part due the 2017 Italian electoral law and a divided left for the majoritarian system, opinion polls showed that the FdI-led centre-right coalition was highly favoured to win the election with a comfortable majority, in what would be the most right-wing government in the history of the Italian Republic according to some academics.

Some mid-July polls showed that the only way to avoid a right-wing alliance victory or to make the election more competitive was the formation of a large big tent coalition including the Democratic Party (PD), minor left-wing and centrist parties, and the PD's 2019–2021 government ally, the Five Star Movement. Early August polls showed the Action – Italia Viva (Third Pole) split from the centre-left coalition would not be influential in single-member districts but could cost votes for the centre-left in some competitive districts.

== Voter turnout ==
Voter turnout was the lowest in the history of republican Italy at 63.9%, about 9 percentage points below the 2018 election.

| Region | Time | | |
| Region | 12:00 | 19:00 | 23:00 |
|---|---|---|---|
| Abruzzo | 17.16% | 51.38% | 63.99% |
| Aosta Valley | 19.92% | 48.76% | 60.59% |
| Apulia | 16.80% | 42.57% | 56.56% |
| Basilicata | 13.86% | 41.27% | 58.77% |
| Calabria | 12.84% | 36.91% | 50.80% |
| Campania | 12.44% | 38.70% | 53.27% |
| Emilia-Romagna | 23.46% | 59.74% | 71.97% |
| Friuli-Venezia Giulia | 21.68% | 56.20% | 66.21% |
| Lazio | 20.83% | 53.42% | 64.34% |
| Liguria | 21.89% | 53.44% | 64.19% |
| Lombardy | 22.42% | 58.34% | 70.09% |
| Marche | 20.15% | 55.69% | 68.39% |
| Molise | 13.00% | 44.04% | 56.54% |
| Piedmont | 20.47% | 53.60% | 66.35% |
| Sardinia | 15.58% | 40.96% | 53.17% |
| Sicily | 14.77% | 41.89% | 57.34% |
| Tuscany | 22.31% | 58.06% | 69.75% |
| Trentino-Alto Adige | 18.93% | 52.54% | 66.04% |
| Umbria | 20.09% | 56.07% | 68.83% |
| Veneto | 22.13% | 57.57% | 70.17% |
| Total | 19.21% | 51.14% | 63.91% |
Source: Ministry of the Interior

== Results ==
After the polls closed at 23:00 CEST, multiple Italian broadcasters published exit polls that projected the centre-right coalition would win a majority of seats in both the Chamber of Deputies and the Senate of the Republic. The vote count certified the victory of the centre-right coalition led by Brothers of Italy (FdI), which went from 4% in 2018 to 26%.

The centre-right coalition won the absolute majority of seats in both houses of Parliament, with 237 seats in the Chamber and 115 in the Senate. First within the alliance came FdI (26.0%), followed by the League (8.7%) and Forza Italia (8.1%), both of whom suffered losses. Us Moderates failed to reach the 1% threshold and have their votes for the centre-right coalition in the national proportional representation but won 7 seats in the Chamber and 2 seats in the Senate thanks to the first-past-the-post (FPTP) system. The centre-left coalition slightly improved its 2018 popular vote result but came a distant second in terms of seats, 85 in the Chamber and 44 in the Senate, winning only a few more FPTP seats than the Five Star Movement (M5S). The leading party in the centre-left coalition was the Democratic Party (19.0%), followed by the Greens and Left Alliance (3.6%), which won 12 seats in the Chamber and 4 in the Senate; More Europe narrowly missed the national proportional threshold (3%), while Civic Commitment also failed to reach the 1% threshold but both won 2 seats and 1 seat in the Chamber, respectively. The M5S saw its vote more than halved and won 52 seats in the Chamber and 28 in the Senate but defied single-digits polls in July 2022 by winning 15.4% of the popular vote, thanks in part to a strong performance in Southern Italy. Due to FPTP seats, the League was able to gain more seats in both chambers than the M5S and barely less than the PD (69 to 66 in the Chamber and 40 to 30 in the Senate), despite polling half than the PD and about a third of the M5S in the popular vote. The centrist list composed of Action and Italia Viva (Third Pole) won 21 seats in the Chamber and 9 in the Senate, with 7.8% of the vote. Using the Gallagher index, the disproportionality of the Chamber in the election was 12.31 and 10.83 for the Senate; for comparison, the disproportionality in the 2018 election for both houses was 5.50 and 6.12. According to political analyst Wolfango Piccoli, an estimated 30% of voters chose a different party than the one they had voted for in 2018.

In Sicily, the party South calls North won 1 seat in the Chamber and 1 in the Senate. Linguistic minorities representatives like Aosta Valley and the South Tyrolean People's Party also won seats, as well as the Italians-abroad party Associative Movement of Italians Abroad.

=== Chamber of Deputies ===
==== Overall results ====
← Summary of the 25 September 2022 Chamber of Deputies election results
| Coalition | Party | Proportional | | | First-past-the-post | | | Aosta Valley | | | Overseas | | | Total seats | +/− |
| Coalition | Party | Votes | % | Seats | Votes | % | Seats | Votes | % | Seats | Votes | % | Seats | Total seats | +/− |
|---|---|---|---|---|---|---|---|---|---|---|---|---|---|---|---|
| Centre-right coalition | Brothers of Italy | 7,302,517 | 26.00 | 69 | 12,300,244 | 43.79 | 49 | 16,016 | 28.80 | —N/a | 281,949 | 26.00 | 1 | 119 | +87 |
| Centre-right coalition | League | 2,464,005 | 8.77 | 23 | 12,300,244 | 43.79 | 42 | 16,016 | 28.80 | —N/a | 281,949 | 26.00 | 1 | 66 | -59 |
| Centre-right coalition | Forza Italia | 2,278,217 | 8.11 | 22 | 12,300,244 | 43.79 | 23 | 16,016 | 28.80 | —N/a | 281,949 | 26.00 | —N/a | 45 | -59 |
| Centre-right coalition | Us Moderates | 255,505 | 0.91 | – | 12,300,244 | 43.79 | 7 | 16,016 | 28.80 | —N/a | —N/a | —N/a | —N/a | 7 | New |
| Centre-right coalition | Total seats | | | 114 | | | 121 | | | — | | | 2 | 237 | -28 |
| Five Star Movement | | 4,333,972 | 15.43 | 41 | 4,333,972 | 15.43 | 10 | —N/a | —N/a | —N/a | 93,338 | 8.61 | 1 | 52 | -175 |
| Centre-left coalition | Democratic Party – IDP | 5,356,180 | 19.07 | 57 | 7,337,975 | 26.13 | 8 | (Note: Within Aosta Valley) | —N/a | —N/a | 305,759 | 28.20 | 4 | 69 | -43 |
| Centre-left coalition | Greens and Left Alliance | 1,018,669 | 3.63 | 11 | 7,337,975 | 26.13 | 1 | —N/a | —N/a | —N/a | 52,994 | 4.89 | —N/a | 12 | New |
| Centre-left coalition | More Europe | 793,961 | 2.83 | – | 7,337,975 | 26.13 | 2 | —N/a | —N/a | —N/a | 29,971 | 2.76 | —N/a | 2 | -1 |
| Centre-left coalition | Civic Commitment | 169,165 | 0.60 | – | 7,337,975 | 26.13 | 1 | —N/a | —N/a | —N/a | 11,590 | 1.07 | —N/a | 1 | New |
| Centre-left coalition | Total seats | | | 68 | | | 12 | | | — | | | 4 | 84 | -38 |
| Action – Italia Viva | | 2,186,669 | 7.79 | 21 | 2,186,669 | 7.79 | —N/a | | —N/a | —N/a | 60,499 | 5.58 | —N/a | 21 | New |
| South Tyrolean People's Party – PATT | | 117,010 | 0.42 | 1 | 117,010 | 0.42 | 2 | —N/a | —N/a | —N/a | —N/a | —N/a | —N/a | 3 | -1 |
| South calls North | | 212,685 | 0.76 | —N/a | 212,685 | 0.76 | 1 | —N/a | —N/a | —N/a | —N/a | —N/a | —N/a | 1 | New |
| Aosta Valley | | —N/a | —N/a | —N/a | —N/a | —N/a | —N/a | 20,763 | 38.63 | 1 | —N/a | —N/a | —N/a | 1 | – |
| Associative Movement of Italians Abroad | | —N/a | —N/a | —N/a | —N/a | —N/a | —N/a | —N/a | —N/a | —N/a | 141,356 | 13.04 | 1 | 1 | 0 |
| Others | | 1,599,227 | 5.68 | —N/a | 1,599,227 | 5.68 | —N/a | 16,967 | 32.57 | —N/a | 106,847 | 9.85 | —N/a | —N/a | —N/a |
| Total | | 28,087,782 | 100 | 245 | 28,087,782 | 100 | 146 | 53,746 | 100 | 1 | 1,084,303 | 100 | 8 | 400 | |

Notes

Popular vote (party)
| FdI | 25.98% |
| PD | 19.04% |
| M5S | 15.43% |
| Lega | 8.79% |
| FI | 8.11% |
| A–IV | 7.78% |
| AVS | 3.64% |
| +E | 2.83% |
| Others | 8.40% |

Seat distribution (party)
| FdI | 30.00% |
| PD | 17.25% |
| Lega | 16.50% |
| M5S | 13.00% |
| FI | 11.25% |
| A–IV | 5.25% |
| AVS | 3.00% |
| NM | 1.75% |
| Others | 2.00% |

Popular vote (coalition)
| CDX | 43.79% |
| CSX | 26.12% |
| M5S | 15.43% |
| A–IV | 7.78% |
| Others | 6.88% |

Seat distribution (coalition)
| CDX | 59.25% |
| CSX | 21.25% |
| M5S | 13.00% |
| A–IV | 5.25% |
| Others | 1.25% |

==== Proportional results ====
Proportional distribution of seats by party in the Chamber of Deputies

| Party | Votes | % | Seats |
|---|---|---|---|
| Brothers of Italy (FdI) | 7,301,303 | 25.98 | 69 |
| Democratic Party – IDP (PD–IDP) | 5,348,676 | 19.04 | 57 |
| Five Star Movement (M5S) | 4,335,494 | 15.43 | 41 |
| League (Lega) | 2,470,318 | 8.79 | 23 |
| Forza Italia (FI) | 2,279,266 | 8.11 | 22 |
| Action – Italia Viva (A–IV) | 2,186,505 | 7.78 | 21 |
| Greens and Left Alliance (AVS) | 1,021,808 | 3.64 | 11 |
| More Europe (+E) | 796,057 | 2.83 | – |
| Italexit for Italy (Italexit) | 534,950 | 1.90 | – |
| People's Union (UP) | 403,149 | 1.43 | – |
| Sovereign and Popular Italy (ISP) | 348,831 | 1.24 | – |
| Us Moderates (NM) | 254,127 | 0.91 | – |
| South calls North (ScN) | 212,954 | 0.76 | – |
| Vita (V) | 201,737 | 0.72 | – |
| Civic Commitment (IC) | 173,555 | 0.62 | – |
| South Tyrolean People's Party – PATT (SVP–PATT) | 117,032 | 0.42 | 1 |
| Us of the Centre – Europeanists (NDC–Eu) | 46,230 | 0.16 | – |
| Italian Communist Party (PCI) | 24,549 | 0.09 | – |
| Animalist Party – UCDL – 10VM (PAI–UCDL–10VM) | 21,451 | 0.08 | – |
| Alternative for Italy (APLI) | 17,137 | 0.06 | – |
| Party of Creative Madness (PFC) | 1,419 | 0.00 | – |
| Free (F) | 829 | 0.00 | – |
| Force of the People (FdP) | 819 | 0.00 | – |
| Total | 28,098,196 | 100.00 | 245 |
| Invalid / blank / unassigned votes | 1,286,915 | 4.38 | – |
| Total turnout | 29,385,111 | 63.85 | – |
| Registered voters | 46,021,956 | – | – |
Source: Ministry of the Interior

==== First-past-the-post results ====
Winning candidates in constituencies for the Chamber of Deputies

| Party or coalition | Votes | % | Seats |
|---|---|---|---|
| Centre-right coalition (CDX) | 12,305,014 | 43.79 | 121 |
| Centre-left coalition (CSX) | 7,340,096 | 26.12 | 12 |
| Five Star Movement (M5S) | 4,335,494 | 15.43 | 10 |
| Action – Italia Viva (A–IV) | 2,186,505 | 7.78 | – |
| Italexit for Italy (Italexit) | 534,950 | 1.90 | – |
| People's Union (UP) | 403,149 | 1.43 | – |
| Sovereign and Popular Italy (ISP) | 348,831 | 1.24 | – |
| South calls North (ScN) | 212,954 | 0.76 | 1 |
| Vita (V) | 201,737 | 0.72 | – |
| South Tyrolean People's Party – PATT (SVP–PATT) | 117,032 | 0.42 | 2 |
| Us of the Centre – Europeanists (NDC–Eu) | 46,230 | 0.16 | – |
| Italian Communist Party (PCI) | 24,549 | 0.09 | – |
| Animalist Party – UCDL – 10VM (PAI–UCDL–10VM) | 21,451 | 0.08 | – |
| Alternative for Italy (APLI) | 17,137 | 0.06 | – |
| Party of Creative Madness (PFC) | 1,419 | 0.00 | – |
| Free (F) | 829 | 0.00 | – |
| Force of the People (FdP) | 819 | 0.00 | – |
| Total | 28,098,196 | 100.00 | 146 |
| Invalid / blank / unassigned votes | 1,286,915 | 4.38 | – |
| Total turnout | 29,385,111 | 63.85 | – |
| Registered voters | 46,021,956 | – | – |
Source: Ministry of the Interior

==== Aosta Valley ====
The autonomous region of Aosta Valley in northwestern Italy elects one member to the Chamber of Deputies through a direct first-past-the-post election. Some parties that formed electoral coalitions in Italy might have opted to run against one another, or form different coalitions, in this particular region.

| Candidate | Party | Votes | % | Result |
|---|---|---|---|---|
| Franco Manes | Aosta Valley (VdA) (Note: Including Democratic Party (PD), Action (A), Italia Viva (IV), Valdostan Union (UV), Valdostan Alliance (AV), United Aosta Valley (VdAU), and Edelweiss (SA)) | 20,763 | 38.63 | Elected |
| Emily Rini | Centre-right coalition (Lega–FI–NM–FdI) | 16,016 | 28.80 | |
| Giovanni Girardini | The Valdostan Renaissance (LRV) | 6,398 | 11.90 | |
| Erika Guichardaz | Open Aosta Valley (Open VdA) (Note: Including Five Star Movement (M5S), Democratic Area – Autonomist Left (AD–GA), Environment Rights Equality (ADU), and Italian Left (SI)) | 5,841 | 10.87 | |
| Loredana Ronc | Sovereign and Popular Italy (ISP) | 2,302 | 4.28 | |
| Loredana De Rosa | People's Union (UP) | 1,375 | 2.56 | |
| Davide Ianni | Italian Communist Party (PCI) | 1,051 | 1.96 | |
| Total | | 53,746 | 100.00 | 1 |
| Invalid / blank / unassigned votes | | 5,740 | 9.66 | – |
| Total turnout | | 59,490 | 60.59 | – |
| Registered voters | | 98,187 | – | – |
Source: Ministry of the Interior

==== Overseas constituencies ====
Eight members of the Chamber of Deputies are elected by Italians abroad. Two members are elected for North America and Central America (including most of the Caribbean), two members for South America (including Trinidad and Tobago), three members for Europe, and one member for the rest of the world (Africa, Asia, Oceania, and Antarctica). Voters in these regions select candidate lists and cast a preference vote for individual candidates. The seats are allocated by proportional representation. The electoral law allows for parties to form different coalitions on the lists abroad, compared to the lists in Italy; Forza Italia, the League, and Brothers of Italy formed a unified list for abroad constituencies.

| Party | Votes | % | Seats |
|---|---|---|---|
| Democratic Party – IDP (PD–IDP) | 306,105 | 28.20 | 4 |
| League – Forza Italia – Brothers of Italy (Lega–FI–FdI) | 282,636 | 26.04 | 2 |
| Associative Movement of Italians Abroad (MAIE) | 141,440 | 13.03 | 1 |
| Five Star Movement (M5S) | 93,219 | 8.59 | 1 |
| South American Union of Italian Emigrants (USEI) | 73,389 | 6.76 | – |
| Action – Italia Viva (A–IV) | 60,456 | 5.57 | – |
| Greens and Left Alliance (AVS) | 52,962 | 4.88 | – |
| More Europe (+E) | 29,947 | 2.76 | – |
| Movement of Freedoms (MdL) | 18,348 | 1.69 | – |
| Italy of the South (IdM) | 15,442 | 1.42 | – |
| Civic Commitment (IC) | 11,608 | 1.07 | – |
| Total | 1,085,552 | 100.00 | 8 |
| Invalid / blank / unassigned votes | 164,929 | 13.19 | – |
| Total turnout | 1,250,481 | 26.36 | – |
| Registered voters | 4,743,980 | – | – |
Source: Ministry of the Interior

=== Senate of the Republic ===
==== Overall results ====
← Summary of the 25 September 2022 Senate of the Republic election results
| Coalition | Party | Proportional | | | First-past-the-post | | | Aosta Valley | | | Trentino-Alto Adige | | | Overseas | | | Total seats | +/− |
| Coalition | Party | Votes | % | Seats | Votes | % | Seats | Votes | % | Seats | Votes | % | Seats | Votes | % | Seats | Total seats | +/− |
|---|---|---|---|---|---|---|---|---|---|---|---|---|---|---|---|---|---|---|
| Centre-right coalition | Brothers of Italy | 7,167,136 | 26.01 | 34 | 12,129,547 | 44.02 | 31 | 18,509 | 34.05 | —N/a | 137,015 | 27.24 | —N/a | 294,712 | 27.05 | —N/a | 65 | +47 |
| Centre-right coalition | League | 2,439,200 | 8.85 | 13 | 12,129,547 | 44.02 | 14 | 18,509 | 34.05 | 1 | 137,015 | 27.24 | 1 | 294,712 | 27.05 | —N/a | 29 | -29 |
| Centre-right coalition | Forza Italia | 2,279,802 | 8.27 | 9 | 12,129,547 | 44.02 | 9 | 18,509 | 34.05 | —N/a | 137,015 | 27.24 | —N/a | 294,712 | 27.05 | —N/a | 18 | -39 |
| Centre-right coalition | Us Moderates | 243,409 | 0.88 | —N/a | 12,129,547 | 44.02 | 2 | 18,509 | 34.05 | —N/a | 137,015 | 27.24 | 1 | —N/a | —N/a | —N/a | 3 | New |
| Centre-right coalition | Total seats | | | 56 | | | 56 | | | 1 | | | 2 | | | — | 115 | -22 |
| Five Star Movement | | 4,285,894 | 15.55 | 23 | 4,285,894 | 15.55 | 5 | —N/a | —N/a | —N/a | 28,355 | 5.64 | —N/a | 101,794 | 9.34 | —N/a | 28 | -84 |
| Centre-left coalition | Democratic Party–IDP | 5,226,732 | 18.96 | 31 | 7,161,688 | 25.99 | 4 | (Note: Within Aosta Valley) | —N/a | —N/a | 149,682 | 29,29 | 1 | 370,262 | 33.98 | 3 | 39 | -14 |
| Centre-left coalition | Greens and Left Alliance | 972,316 | 3.53 | 3 | 7,161,688 | 25.99 | 1 | —N/a | —N/a | —N/a | 149,682 | 29,29 | —N/a | —N/a | —N/a | —N/a | 4 | New |
| Centre-left coalition | Campobase | —N/a | —N/a | —N/a | 7,161,688 | 25.99 | —N/a | —N/a | —N/a | —N/a | 149,682 | 29,29 | 1 | —N/a | —N/a | —N/a | 1 | New |
| Centre-left coalition | Others | 972,214 | 3.53 | —N/a | 7,161,688 | 25.99 | —N/a | —N/a | —N/a | —N/a | 149,682 | 29,29 | —N/a | 14,610 | 1.34 | 0 | 0 | 0 |
| Centre-left coalition | Total seats | | | 34 | | | 5 | | | — | | | 2 | | | 3 | 44 | -16 |
| Action – Italia Viva | | 2,131,310 | 7.73 | 9 | 2,131,310 | 7.73 | —N/a | | —N/a | —N/a | 6,782 | 1.35 | —N/a | 76,070 | 6.98 | —N/a | 9 | New |
| South Tyrolean People's Party – PATT | | —N/a | —N/a | —N/a | —N/a | —N/a | —N/a | —N/a | —N/a | —N/a | 116,003 | 23.06 | 2 | —N/a | —N/a | —N/a | 2 | -1 |
| South calls North | | 271,549 | 0.99 | —N/a | 271,549 | 0.99 | 1 | —N/a | —N/a | —N/a | —N/a | —N/a | —N/a | —N/a | —N/a | —N/a | 1 | New |
| Associative Movement of Italians Abroad | | —N/a | —N/a | —N/a | —N/a | —N/a | —N/a | —N/a | —N/a | —N/a | —N/a | —N/a | —N/a | 138,758 | 12.73 | 1 | 1 | 0 |
| Others | | 2,119,823 | 5,72 | 0 | 2,119,823 | 5,72 | 0 | 35,850 | 65.95 | —N/a | 65.117 | 13.42 | 0 | 93,107 | 8.54 | —N/a | 0 | 0 |
| Total | | 27,569,675 | 100 | 122 | 27,569,675 | 100 | 67 | 54,359 | 100 | 1 | 502,954 | 100 | 6 | 1,090,147 | 100 | 4 | 200 | |

Notes

Popular vote (party)
| FdI | 26.00% |
| PD | 18.93% |
| M5S | 15.56% |
| Lega | 8.84% |
| FI | 8.27% |
| A–IV | 7.73% |
| AVS | 3.53% |
| +E | 2.94% |
| Others | 8.20% |

Seat distribution (party)
| FdI | 32.50% |
| PD | 20.00% |
| Lega | 15.00% |
| M5S | 14.00% |
| FI | 9.00% |
| A–IV | 4.50% |
| AVS | 2.00% |
| NM | 1.00% |
| Others | 2.00% |

Popular vote (coalition)
| CDX | 44.02% |
| CSX | 25.99% |
| M5S | 15.56% |
| A–IV | 7.73% |
| Others | 6.70% |

Seat distribution (coalition)
| CDX | 57.50% |
| CSX | 22.00% |
| M5S | 14.00% |
| A–IV | 4.50% |
| Others | 2.00% |

==== Proportional results ====
Proportional distribution of seats by party in the Senate of the Republic

| Party | Votes | % | Seats |
|---|---|---|---|
| Brothers of Italy (FdI) | 7,168,875 | 26.00 | 34 |
| Democratic Party – IDP (PD–IDP) | 5,220,256 | 18.93 | 31 |
| Five Star Movement (M5S) | 4,290,194 | 15.55 | 23 |
| League (Lega) | 2,437,406 | 8.84 | 13 |
| Forza Italia (FI) | 2,281,258 | 8.27 | 9 |
| Action – Italia Viva (A–IV) | 2,131,023 | 7.73 | 9 |
| Greens and Left Alliance (AVS) | 972,780 | 3.53 | 3 |
| More Europe (+E) | 810,441 | 2.94 | – |
| Italexit for Italy (Italexit) | 515,657 | 1.87 | – |
| People's Union (UP) | 374,247 | 1.36 | – |
| Sovereign and Popular Italy (ISP) | 309,391 | 1.12 | – |
| South calls North (ScN) | 272,462 | 0.99 | – |
| Us Moderates (NM) | 248,308 | 0.90 | – |
| Vita (V) | 196,644 | 0.71 | – |
| Civic Commitment (IC) | 161,773 | 0.59 | – |
| Italian Communist Party (PCI) | 70,938 | 0.26 | – |
| Us of the Centre – Europeanists (NDC–Eu) | 42,905 | 0.16 | – |
| Alternative for Italy (APLI) | 40,397 | 0.15 | – |
| Animalist Party – UCDL – 10VM (PAI–UCDL–10VM) | 16,950 | 0.06 | – |
| Workers' Communist Party (PCL) | 4,491 | 0.02 | – |
| United Right – Royal Italy (DU–IR) | 2,415 | 0.01 | – |
| Force of the People (FdP) | 864 | 0.01 | – |
| Total | 27,569,675 | 100.00 | 122 |
| Invalid / blank / unassigned votes | 1,281,165 | 4.44 | – |
| Total turnout | 28,850,840 | 63.81 | – |
| Registered voters | 45,210,950 | – | – |
Source: Ministry of the Interior

==== First-past-the-post results ====
Winning candidates in constituencies for the Senate of the Republic

| Party or coalition | Votes | % | Seats |
|---|---|---|---|
| Centre-right coalition (CDX) | 12,135,847 | 44.02 | 56 |
| Centre-left coalition (CSX) | 7,165,250 | 25.99 | 5 |
| Five Star Movement (M5S) | 4,290,194 | 15.55 | 5 |
| Action – Italia Viva (A–IV) | 2,131,023 | 7.73 | – |
| Italexit for Italy (Italexit) | 515,657 | 1.87 | – |
| People's Union (UP) | 374,247 | 1.36 | – |
| Sovereign and Popular Italy (ISP) | 309,391 | 1.12 | – |
| South calls North (ScN) | 272,462 | 0.99 | 1 |
| Vita (V) | 196,644 | 0.71 | – |
| Italian Communist Party (PCI) | 70,938 | 0.26 | – |
| Us of the Centre – Europeanists (NDC–Eu) | 42,905 | 0.16 | – |
| Alternative for Italy (APLI) | 40,397 | 0.15 | – |
| Animalist Party – UCDL – 10VM (PAI–UCDL–10VM) | 16,950 | 0.06 | – |
| Workers' Communist Party (PCL) | 4,491 | 0.02 | – |
| United Right – Royal Italy (DU–IR) | 2,415 | 0.01 | – |
| Force of the People (FdP) | 864 | 0.01 | – |
| Total | 27,569,675 | 100.00 | 67 |
| Invalid / blank / unassigned votes | 1,281,165 | 4.44 | – |
| Total turnout | 28,850,840 | 63.81 | – |
| Registered voters | 45,210,950 | – | – |
Source: Ministry of the Interior

==== Aosta Valley ====
| Candidate | Party | Votes | % | Result |
|---|---|---|---|---|
| Nicoletta Spelgatti | Centre-right coalition (Lega–FI–NM–FdI) | 18,509 | 34.05 | Elected |
| Patrik Vesan | Aosta Valley (VdA) (Note: Including Democratic Party (PD), Action (A), Italia Viva (IV), Valdostan Union (UV), Valdostan Alliance (AV), United Aosta Valley (VdAU), and Edelweiss (SA)) | 18,282 | 33.63 | |
| Augusto Rollandin | For Autonomy (PlA) | 7,272 | 13.38 | |
| Daria Pulz | Open Aosta Valley (Open VdA) (Note: Including Five Star Movement (M5S), Democratic Area – Autonomist Left (AD–GA), Environment Rights Equality (ADU), and Italian Left (SI)) | 5,448 | 10.02 | |
| Alessandro Bianchini | Sovereign and Popular Italy (ISP) | 1,569 | 2.89 | |
| Francesco Lucat | People's Union (UP) | 1,311 | 2.41 | |
| Guglielmo Leray | Italian Communist Party (PCI) | 1,051 | 1.93 | |
| Larisa Bargan | Vita (V) | 917 | 1.69 | |
| Total | | 54,359 | 100.00 | 1 |
| Invalid / blank / unassigned votes | | 5,131 | 8.62 | – |
| Total turnout | | 59,490 | 60.59 | – |
| Registered voters | | 98,187 | – | – |

==== Trentino-Alto Adige ====
| Party | Votes | % | Seats |
|---|---|---|---|
| Centre-right coalition (Lega–FI–NM–FdI) | 137,015 | 27.24 | 2 |
| South Tyrolean People's Party – PATT (SVP–PATT) | 116,003 | 23.06 | 2 |
| Centre-left coalition (CB–+E–AVS–PD–A–IV) | 100,602 | 20.00 | 1 |
| Five Star Movement (M5S) | 28,355 | 5.64 | – |
| Centre-left coalition (PD–IDP–+E–AVS) | 21,894 | 4.35 | 1 |
| Vita (V) | 17,876 | 3.55 | – |
| Greens and Left Alliance (AVS) | 17,574 | 3.49 | – |
| Sovereign and Popular Italy (ISP) | 15,252 | 3.03 | – |
| Die Freiheitlichen (DF) | 14,479 | 2.88 | – |
| Team K (TK) | 11,157 | 2.22 | – |
| Democratic Party – IDP (PD–IDP) | 9,612 | 1.91 | – |
| Action – Italia Viva (A–IV) | 6,782 | 1.35 | – |
| People's Union (UP) | 6,353 | 1.26 | – |
| Total | 502,954 | 100.00 | 6 |
| Invalid / blank / unassigned votes | 32,625 | 6.09 | – |
| Total turnout | 811,006 | 66.04 | – |
| Registered voters | | – | – |

==== Overseas constituencies ====
Four members of the Senate of the Republic are elected by Italians abroad. One member is elected for North America and Central America (including most of the Caribbean), one member for South America (including Trinidad and Tobago), one member for Europe, and one for the rest of the world (Africa, Asia, Oceania, and Antarctica). Voters in these regions select candidate lists and cast a preference vote for individual candidates. The seats are allocated by proportional representation. The electoral law allows for parties to form different coalitions on the lists abroad, compared to the lists in Italy; since January 2018, Forza Italia, the League, and Brothers of Italy have formed a unified list for abroad constituencies.

| Party | Votes | % | Seats |
|---|---|---|---|
| Democratic Party – IDP (PD–IDP) | 370,549 | 33.99 | 3 |
| League – Forza Italia – Brothers of Italy (Lega–FI–FdI) | 295,467 | 27.10 | – |
| Associative Movement of Italians Abroad (MAIE) | 138,337 | 12.69 | 1 |
| Five Star Movement (M5S) | 101,925 | 9.35 | – |
| Action – Italia Viva (A–IV) | 76,152 | 6.99 | – |
| South American Union of Italian Emigrants (USEI) | 55,523 | 5.09 | – |
| Movement of Freedoms (MdL) | 23,384 | 2.15 | – |
| Civic Commitment (IC) | 14,610 | 1.34 | – |
| Italy of the South (IdM) | 14,200 | 1.30 | – |
| Total | 1,090,147 | 100.00 | 4 |
| Invalid / blank / unassigned votes | 143,681 | 11.65 | – |
| Total turnout | 1.233.828 | 26.01 | – |
| Registered voters | 4,743,980 | – | – |
Source: Ministry of the Interior

=== Leaders' races ===
Of party leaders, Meloni (FdI), Berlusconi (FI), Bonelli (AVS), and Lupi (NM) won in their respective first-past-the-post (FPTP) seats. Others like Di Maio (IC), Bonino (+E), and Calenda (A–IV) lost their FPTP election; Calenda won a seat in the proportional representation (PR) lists. Letta (PD), Conte (M5S), and Salvini (Lega) did not run in FPTP elections, and won their seats in the PR apportionment.

=== Electorate demographics ===
Sociology of the electorate
| Demographic | Centre-right | Centre-left | M5S | A–IV | Others | Turnout |
|---|---|---|---|---|---|---|
| Total vote | 43.8% | 26.1% | 15.4% | 7.8% | 6.9% | 63.8% |
Sex
| Men | 44.6% | 24.3% | 15.2% | 8.6% | 7.3% | 63.1% |
| Women | 42.9% | 28.0% | 15.6% | 6.9% | 6.6% | 58.5% |
Age
| 18–34 years old | 30.0% | 32.9% | 20.9% | 8.5% | 7.7% | 57.3% |
| 35–49 years old | 49.6% | 21.0% | 17.4% | 5.7% | 6.3% | 57.6% |
| 50–64 years old | 45.6% | 22.5% | 16.6% | 6.9% | 8.4% | 65.2% |
| 65 or older | 46.9% | 29.3% | 8.8% | 9.9% | 5.1% | 61.8% |
Occupation
| Student | 19.1% | 44.5% | 24.8% | 8.0% | 3.6% | 64.5% |
| Unemployed | 43.5% | 22.3% | 23.5% | 3.3% | 7.4% | 52.2% |
| Housewife | 51.1% | 19.9% | 19.0% | 5.4% | 4.6% | 63.0% |
| Blue-collar | 56.5% | 15.7% | 16.4% | 3.9% | 7.5% | 56.6% |
| White-collar | 38.4% | 30.7% | 13.8% | 10.8% | 6.3% | 67.2% |
| Self-employed | 43.3% | 16.0% | 15.8% | 7.5% | 17.4% | 70.0% |
| Manager | 42.6% | 28.2% | 11.6% | 12.3% | 5.3% | 74.1% |
| Retired | 44.4% | 30.5% | 9.9% | 9.0% | 6.2% | 59.9% |
Education
| Elementary school | 49.8% | 22.0% | 16.7% | 5.2% | 6.3% | 54.8% |
| High school | 42.4% | 25.5% | 16.1% | 7.4% | 8.6% | 64.2% |
| University | 32.8% | 36.7% | 11.3% | 14.3% | 4.9% | 71.1% |
Economic condition
| Lower | 49.2% | 14.4% | 25.0% | 3.4% | 8.0% | 50.6% |
| Middle-lower | 50.1% | 19.7% | 18.2% | 5.2% | 6.8% | 52.7% |
| Middle | 41.7% | 28.9% | 14.0% | 7.9% | 7.5% | 64.0% |
| Upper-middle | 37.1% | 32.6% | 11.4% | 11.5% | 7.4% | 71.7% |
| Upper | 41.1% | 34.8% | 10.2% | 11.7% | 2.2% | 72.5% |
Source: Ipsos Italia

== Aftermath ==
=== Analysis ===
In a record-low voter turnout election, exit polls projected that the centre-right coalition would win a majority of seats. Giorgia Meloni was projected to be the winner of the election. Her party, Brothers of Italy, having taken advantage of opposition to the national unity government in 2021–2022, went from 4% in 2018 to 26% in 2022, and received a plurality of seats; per a pre-election agreement within the centre-right coalition, which held that the largest party in the coalition would nominate the next Prime Minister of Italy, Meloni is the frontrunner. She would be Italy's first female prime minister, the first far-right head of government of a major eurozone country, and its first far-right leader since Benito Mussolini, and lead the most right-wing government since World War II.

According to observers, the result of the Italian election, together with far-right gains in the 2022 Spanish regional elections in February and June, the 2022 French legislative election in April, and the 2022 Swedish general election earlier on 11 September shifted the geopolitics of Europe. Historian Ruth Ben-Ghiat described Meloni as "an avowed fan of Mussolini", and she argued that her government, apart from being led for the first time by a woman, which Hillary Clinton said it would represent "a break with the past, and that is certainly a good thing", to which she responded "Meloni would also represent continuity with Italy's darkest episode: the interwar dictatorship of Benito Mussolini". Historian Timothy Garton Ash argued that "Meloni is undoubtedly an anti-immigration, rightwing populist, a strong social conservative and a Eurosceptic nationalist ... Reactionary and nationalist Meloni's ideology may be, but it has little if any of the glorification of martial violence, let alone the actual violence, that are characteristic of fascism."

The centre-right coalition successfully took advantage of the majoritarian system and stayed united, which the left and centre were not able to achieve. The Five Star Movement (M5S) finished third in terms of popular vote, avoiding an even bigger victory for the right. Despite the win of the right-wing alliance, both Forza Italia and the League suffered losses. Leila Simona Talani of King's College London said that a right-wing government would face many issues and questioned their economic experience. Gianluca Passarrelli of Sapienza University commented: "I think we will see more restrictions on civil rights and policies on LGBT and immigrants." Emiliana De Blasio, adviser for diversity and inclusion at LUISS University in Rome, stated that Meloni is "not raising up at all questions on women's rights and empowerment in general".

Political scientist Lorenzo Castellani commented that the stability and durability of a right-wing government depended on the final results. He said that, at 44%, the Meloni-led coalition "can govern in a much more stable way, without problems". At 42%, they would have had a smaller majority, while a 46–47% result could have given them the necessary first-past-the-post seats to reach the two-thirds supermajority and approve constitutional reforms without a referendum. Observers, such as political scientist Giovanni Orsina, said that far-right supporters would be disappointed by a Meloni government because she is now part of the mainstream right like the Conservative Party in the United Kingdom.

=== Reactions ===
==== Politics ====
The Democratic Party (PD), the head of the centre-left coalition, conceded defeat shortly after the exit polls. Meloni said the centre-right coalition has a clear mandate and that Italians had sent "a clear message", while Matteo Salvini stated: "It's a good day for Italy because it has five years of stability ahead of it." Prime ministers from various countries, including Viktor Orbán (Hungary), Mateusz Morawiecki (Poland), Petr Fiala (Czech Republic), and Liz Truss (United Kingdom) congratulated Meloni, as did far-right politicians Marine Le Pen and Éric Zemmour in France. Other European radical right parties and leaders, such as Alternative for Germany and Vox in Spain, also celebrated the right-wing victory. Spain's foreign minister José Manuel Albares said that "populisms always acquire importance and always end in the same way: in catastrophe." Brazil's president Jair Bolsonaro, whose son Eduardo signed the anti-leftist Madrid Charter with Meloni, also celebrated her victory, saying he and Meloni chose a similar slogan.

Enrico Letta, the PD's secretary, stated "the trend that emerged two weeks ago in Sweden was confirmed in Italy", described it as a "sad day for Italy, for Europe", and called for a reflection within the party. Letta added that his party would provide a "strong and intransigent opposition", and announced he would not stand for the 2023 PD leadership election. Debora Serracchiani, a senior PD lawmaker, said that it was "a sad evening for the country", adding: "[The right] has the majority in parliament, but not in the country." Giuseppe Conte, leader of the M5S, said he would lead an "uncompromising opposition" and commented: "We will be the outpost for the progressive agenda against inequalities, to protect families and businesses in difficulty, to defend the rights and values of our Constitution."

European Union (EU) officials were reportedly anxious about the aftermath of the results, with France's prime minister Élisabeth Borne saying the EU would follow the situation to make sure that human rights and EU values, including women's access to abortion, are respected. The European Commission expressed their hope towards a positive relationship with the next Italian government. France's president Emmanuel Macron said his country respected the electoral results and that "as neighbors and friends, we must continue to work together. It is within Europe that we will overcome our common challenges." In the United States, the Biden administration was reportedly worried by the results but pledged for cooperation, while prominent Republican Party members celebrated FdI's results. Antony Blinken, United States Secretary of State, commented: "We are eager to work with Italy's government on our shared goals: supporting a free and independent Ukraine, respecting human rights and building a sustainable economic future."

About a Meloni-led government, Stefano Stefanini, Italy's former ambassador to NATO, stated: "The faithful need to know that her government would be tough on immigration, critical of the EU, and based on traditional values. Moderates, markets and the foreign allies want continuity." Ukraine's president Volodymyr Zelenskyy congratulated Meloni on her victory and expressed interest in collaborating with her government, especially in regard to the Russian invasion of Ukraine. The Russian government was reported to be pleased by the results. Kremlin's spokesman Dmitry Peskov said: "We are ready to welcome any political forces that are able to go beyond the established mainstream, which is filled with hate for our country ... and show willingness to be constructive in relations with our country."

Several politicians also congratulated Meloni, especially centre-right and right-wing politicians worldwide, including in Australia, France, Germany, Hungary, Poland and Spain.

==== News press and others ====
The International Auschwitz Committee was shocked by the results, with its executive vice-president Christoph Heubner saying: "For all survivors of the Holocaust and the heirs of the Italian resistance, one of the most important resistance movements against fascism in Europe, this election outcome is a shocking and sad event." Without explicitly mentioning the results, Pope Francis warned against "raising walls against our brothers and sisters". Many foreign newspapers and international observers, including Al Jazeera, the Associated Press, the BBC, CNBC, CNN, The Daily Telegraph, Euronews, Le Figaro, Fox News, The Guardian, Haaretz, Le Monde, El Mundo, El País, The New York Times, Politico, Sky News, Time, The Times, the Times of Israel, The Wall Street Journal, and The Washington Post, commented the results as a right-wing shift, and several of them described it as the first time that a far-right political party won an Italian election since the end of the Second World War.

French newspaper Libération portrayed the election result as "post-fascism in power", as well as a "European earthquake". while the German Frankfurter Allgemeine Zeitung commented that "Meloni is not the devil", and that "the economy hopes for stability". Die Zeit observed that whether Meloni would form a new government depends on President Mattarella. In Britain, the Financial Times wrote that "Giorgia Meloni's victory merits concern but not panic", having tapped into "Italians' wish for radical change", and cited the "economic storm" she would have to face, while The Economist reported that business group were preparing to work with the right-wing government, wanting to maintain the cordial relations regardless of who is leading the government as is custom.

== Government formation ==
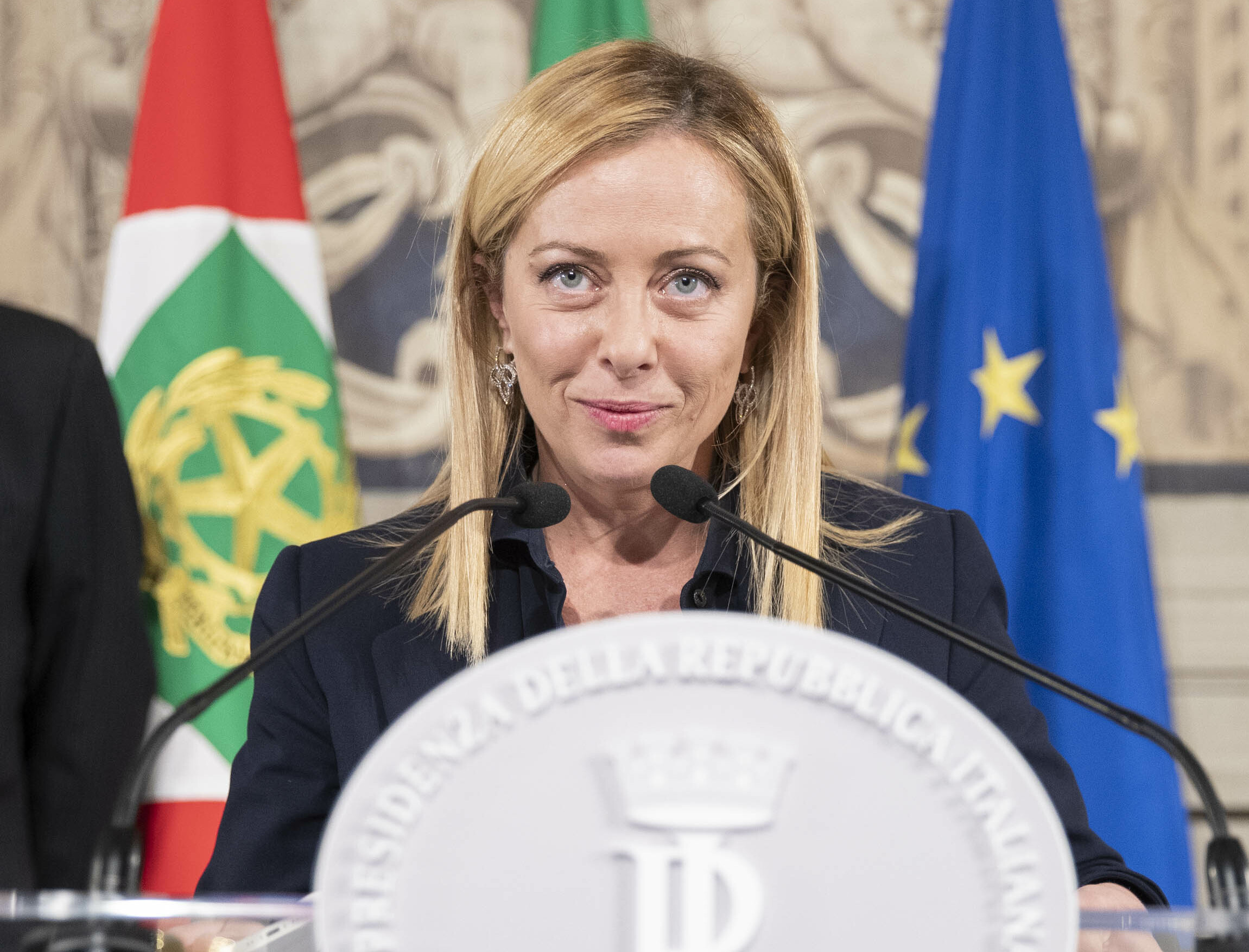
Meloni accepting the task of forming a new government

The newly elected legislature was seated on 13 October. That same day, Ignazio La Russa of Brothers of Italy was elected President of the Senate of the Republic. He is the first politician with a neo-fascist background and to come from a post-fascist party to hold the position, which is the second highest-ranking office of the Italian Republic. He was elected with some votes from parties outside the centre-right coalition, as Forza Italia did not vote. La Russa was proclaimed president by Liliana Segre, a senator for life and Holocaust survivor, who presided the Senate's session due to her being the oldest senator. On 14 October, the League's Lorenzo Fontana, who is widely seen as an ultraconservative for his long-time anti-abortion and anti-LGBT views, was elected President of the Chamber of Deputies.

As per constitutional convention, the new government formation are preceded by rounds of talks between party leaders and President of Italy, Sergio Mattarella, which took place on 20–21 October. On 21 October, Mattarella gave Meloni the task of forming a new government, which was officially sworn in on the following day. The talks were marred by controversy within the centre-right coalition, in particular between Silvio Berlusconi and Meloni, whom Berlusconi described as "patronising, overbearing, arrogant" and "offensive" in a series of written notes in the Senate. Additionally, Berlusconi's views of the Russian invasion of Ukraine and Vladimir Putin, with whom he said he was rekindling their friendship and claimed to have received vodka as gift and exchanged letters, during a group session with his own party were leaked through an audio. Meloni declared that "Italy, with its head high, is part of Europe and the Atlantic alliance", before adding: "Whoever doesn't agree with this cornerstone cannot be part of the government, at the cost of not having a government."

== See also ==
- 2022 Sicilian regional election
- Elections in Italy
- List of elections in 2022
- Opinion polling for the 2022 Italian general election
