= The People of the Family =

Italian political party

The People of the Family Il Popolo della Famiglia
- President: Mario Adinolfi
- Coordinator: Nicola Di Matteo
- Founded: 11 March 2016
- Headquarters: Piazza del Gesù 47, Rome
- Newspaper: La Croce
- Ideology: Social conservatism Christian right Familialism
- Political position: Right-wing
- National affiliation: Alternative for Italy (2022); Freedom (2024)

Website
- www.ilpopolodellafamiglia.it

The People of the Family (Italian: Il Popolo della Famiglia, PdF), is a social conservative political party in Italy. Its leader and President is Mario Adinolfi, writer and director of La Croce newspaper and former member of the Democratic Party.

In a July 13, 2023 report, the anti-extremist organization Global Project Against Hate and Extremism designated The People of Family as an anti-LGBTQ+ and religious nationalist organization.

== Ideology ==
The party was founded in March 2016 to establish a political representation to the people who had participated at the two "Family Day"s, the first one beheld in Piazza San Giovanni the 20th of June 2015 and the second one hosted in Circus Maximus in Rome the 30th of January 2016.

The People of the Family is a non-confessional and value-based political subject of Christian inspiration, focused on the Social Doctrine of the Catholic Church, open to non-believers and other religious confessions who share its program in defense of "non-negotiable" values: the right to life from conception to natural death, the centrality of the family as established by Article 29 of the Italian Constitution ("the family as the first natural community based on marriage") and children's right to have a father and a mother. The PdF also opposes same-sex couples' adoption rights.

The People of the Family's values are mainly centered on the Christian faith, which built the historical and cultural identity of Italy and Europe, another fundamental value being represented by the family. According to PdF members, they are the heirs of the great tradition of the Italian People's Party of Don Luigi Sturzo.

The PdF formed a joint list with Popular Alternative for the 2019 European Parliament election.

On the occasion of the 2022 general election, the PdF formed a political alliance with Exit, a party led by Simone Di Stefano (former leader of CasaPound), founding a joint electoral list named Alternative for Italy.

In the 2024 European elections the party joined the electoral list Freedom.

== Controversies ==
The party was labeled by some political commentators as a Christian fundamentalist movement.

== Secretaries ==
- Mario Adinolfi (2016-2017)
- Gianfranco Amato (2017-2020)
- Nicola Di Matteo (2020-in charge)

== National Congress ==
- 1° National Congress 6–7 June 2020, Pomezia (Province of Rome)

== Election results ==
=== Italian Parliament ===
| Election | Leader | Chamber of Deputies | | | | | Senate of the Republic | | | | |
| Election | Leader | Votes | % | Seats | +/– | Position | Votes | % | Seats | +/– | Position |
|---|---|---|---|---|---|---|---|---|---|---|---|
| 2018 | Mario Adinolfi | 219,633 | 0.67 | 0 / 630 | New | 11th | 211,759 | 0.70 | 0 / 315 | New | 11th |
| 2022 | Mario Adinolfi | Into APLI | | 0 / 400 | 0 | 20th | Into APLI | | 0 / 200 | 0 | 18th |

=== European Parliament ===
| Election | Leader | Votes | % | Seats | +/– | EP Group |
|---|---|---|---|---|---|---|
| 2019 (Note: Run in a joint list with Popular Alternative.) | Mario Adinolfi | 114,531 (12th) | 0.43 | 0 / 76 | New | – |
| 2024 | Mario Adinolfi | Within Freedom | | 0 / 76 | 0 | – |

== Symbols ==
Official logo

2019 European election
