= Italian Animalist Party =

Italian Animalist Party Partito Animalista Italiano
- Leader: Cristiano Ceriello
- Spokesperson: Nicolas Micheletti
- Founded: 4 July 2006
- Headquarters: Via Armando Diaz 140, San Giuseppe Vesuviano (NA)
- Youth wing: Gioventù Animalista
- Ideology: Animal rights Animal welfare Environmentalism
- Political position: Left-wing
- National affiliation: PAI–UCDL–10VM (2022); Italexit (2024)
- European affiliation: EAFD (2020–2023); EUDemocrats (2006-2017)
- International affiliation: Animal Politics Foundation
- European political alliance: Animal Politics EU
- Chamber of Deputies: 0 / 400
- Senate: 0 / 200
- European Parliament: 0 / 76
- Regional Councils: 0 / 896

Website
- https://www.partitoanimalista.org/

The Italian Animalist Party (Italian: Partito Animalista Italiano) is a political party in Italy focused animal rights. It was founded on 4 July 2006 and is led by Cristiano Ceriello.

== History ==
The Italian Animalist Party was founded in 2006 by lawyer and animal rights activist Cristiano Ceriello. The main objectives of the Italian Animalist Party are animal liberation and climate change activism. It was one of the member parties of the EUDemocrats, a left-wing Eurosceptic European political party.

In 2019, the Italian Animalist Party participated in the 2019 European Parliament election, obtaining 0.6% at the national level, making it the tenth Italian political party by number of seats held.

In 2020, the party organized food collections for animals during the COVID-19 pandemic in Italy and presented a petition to the president of the province of Trento and to the Prefect and the Minister of the Environment asking for the release of the M49 bear.

== Ideology ==
The Italian Animalist Party was founded with an "ultimate aim to eliminate all forms of animal cruelty". It has taken progressive positions on human rights, healthcare, the environment, energy, the economy, immigrantion and European integration.

The party argues that non-human animals be recognized as sentient beings, and murder and enslavement of them should be made illegal. It also advocates a total abolition of hunting, in addition to greatly limiting intensive farming, long-distance transport of animals and overfishing. The party also proposes a ban om experimentation of non-human animals.

Regarding the environment, the party condemns greenwashing and argues that more effective measures must be taken. It proposes greatly investing in cultured meat while gradually limiting intensive farming and transport industries, and seeks to ban the practice of planned obsolescence. The party also advocated abolition of the consumption tax on plant-based products, along with harsher penalties for pollution crimes.

In its economic program, the Italian Animalist Party praises John Maynard Keynes as "the greatest economist of history". The party states its opposition to neoliberalism, arguing that it has resulted in wealth and the fruits of technological development be accumulated in the hands of the very few. The party also praises the democratic socialist figures of United States of America. The party declares: "The Italian Animalist Party therefore opposes the dominant neoliberal economy that is devastating the planet and social justice, proposing more modern policies, such as Modern Monetary Theory, promoted in the USA by progressives such as Bernie Sanders and Alexandria Ocasio-Cortez."

The party is also Eurosceptic, condemning the European Union as "a half-built organism, suffering from objective democratic deficits and based on neoliberal treaties that have damaged the economy of European countries". The party proposes that the European Union implements the Green New Deal which would "convert the European industrial system to an ecological perspective". It also advocates replacement of the Euro currency with bancor, which would not have a fixed exchange rate and allow the currency to be controlled at the regional level. The party also proposes a mandatory register of lobbies within the European Union.

Regarding immigration, the party believes that the only solution to mass immigration would be to fight global warming, which would prevent and limit wars, poverty and natural disasters such as droughts, reducing the number of refugees and immigrants. The party calls for abolition of CFA franc which it considers "neocolonial", and proposes designating Libya and Tunisia as "safe ports" for immigration.

== Election results ==
=== Italian Parliament ===
Election	Leader	Chamber of Deputies					Senate of the Republic					Government
Election	Leader	Votes	%	Seats	+/–	Position	Votes	%	Seats	+/–	Position	Government
2022	Cristiano Ceriello	21,442	0.08	0 / 400	New	19th	16,957	0.06	0 / 200	New	19th	No seats

=== European Parliament ===
Election	Leader	Votes	%	Seats	+/–	EP Group
2019	Cristiano Ceriello	160,270 (10th)	0.60	0 / 76	New	–
2024 (Note: Run in a joint list with Italexit.)	Cristiano Ceriello	29,552 (14th)	0.13	0 / 76	0	–

=== Regional elections ===
Region	Election year	Votes	%	Seats	+/−
Apulia	2020	5,573	0.3	0 / 51	–
Calabria	2025	1,527	0.2	0 / 31	–
Campania	2020	33,681	1.4	0 / 51	–

== Symbols ==
Old logo

New logo
