= Alternative for Italy =

Italian political alliance

Alternative for Italy Alternativa per l'Italia
- Leaders: Mario Adinolfi, Simone Di Stefano
- Founded: 10 July 2022
- Ideology: Right-wing populism Nationalism; Euroscepticism; Christian right
- Political position: Right-wing

Alternative for Italy (Italian: Alternativa per l'Italia, APLI) is a right-wing populist political alliance in Italy launched on 10 July 2022 by Mario Adinolfi, leader of The People of the Family (PdF), and Simone Di Stefano, leader of Exit.

== History ==
On 10 July 2022, Mario Adinolfi, leader of the Christian-rightist party The People of the Family (PdF), and Simone Di Stefano, leader of the nationalist movement Exit and former secretary of the neo-fascist CasaPound, announced the formation of a joint list to run in the upcoming general election. The party deliberately took inspiration from the nationalist party Alternative for Germany (AfD).

Alternative for Italy harshly condemned the policies promoted by the government of Mario Draghi, especially regarding the mandatory vaccination against COVID-19 and the COVID-19 vaccination certificate (Green Pass). APLI is also against the European Union and in favor of a reconciliation with Vladimir Putin's Russia following the invasion of Ukraine.

== Composition ==
Party	Main ideology	Leader
The People of the Family (PdF)	Christian right	Mario Adinolfi
Exit	Nationalism	Simone Di Stefano

== Electoral results ==
=== Italian Parliament ===
Election	Leader	Chamber of Deputies					Senate of the Republic					Government
Election	Leader	Votes	%	Seats	+/–	Position	Votes	%	Seats	+/–	Position	Government
2022	Mario Adinolfi; Simone Di Stefano	16,882	0.06	0 / 400	New	20th	40,371	0.15	0 / 200	New	18th	No seats
