= Calogero Pisano =

Italian politician (born 1981)

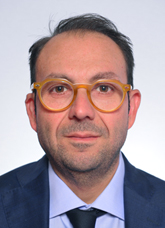
- Pisano in 2022

Member of the Chamber of Deputies
- Incumbent
- Assumed office 13 October 2022
- Constituency: Sicily 1 – 05

Personal details
- Born: 20 June 1981 (age 44)
- Party: Us Moderates

Calogero Pisano (born 20 June 1981) is an Italian politician serving as a member of the Chamber of Deputies since 2022. From 2012 to 2015, he was a municipal councillor of Agrigento.
