= 10 Times Better =

10 Times Better 10 Volte Meglio
- Abbreviation: 10VM
- Leader: Enrico Maria Bozza
- Founded: December 2017
- Ideology: Economic liberalism Liberalism
- Political position: Centre
- National affiliation: Cambiamo! (2019); PAI–UCDL–10VM (2022)
- European affiliation: European Alliance for Freedom and Democracy (2020–2021)
- Colors: Orange
- Chamber of Deputies: 0 / 400
- Senate: 0 / 200
- European Parliament: 0 / 76

Website
- diecivoltemeglio.com

10 Times Better (Italian: 10 Volte Meglio, 10VM), whose official name is Italy 10 Times Better, is a liberal political party in Italy.

== History ==
10 Times Better was founded in December 2017 by the Venetian entrepreneur, Andrea Dusi, to run in the 2018 general election; Dusi's aim is to create an Italian equivalent of Ciudadanos, the Spanish liberal party led by Albert Rivera.

10VM wants to restart investing funds on enterprises, on tourism and innovation which are considered the key points to re-launch Italy. The party considers itself different from Five Star Movement, the anti-establishment party which some commentators have compared to 10VM.

The party's slogan is "Italy Deserves to Be Ten Times Better".

In July 2018, the founder Andrea Dusi decided to leave the political party to continue his activity as civic leader through Impactscool, a no profit organization aiming to prepare the young people to the future.

On 18 April 2019, three Deputies joined the party and created the "Dream Italy–10 Times Better" parliamentary sub-group within the Mixed Group in the Chamber of Deputies. The party voted against the motion of confidence to the Conte II Cabinet.

In September, four deputies officially left Forza Italia to join Cambiamo!. They entered the "Dream Italy–10 Times Better" sub-group, which was then renamed "Cambiamo!–10 Times Better".

== Election results ==
In the political election of the 4th of March, 10VM obtained 37859 votes (0.11%). Best results in Verona where the political leader, Andrea Dusi, obtained 0.82%.

=== Italian Parliament ===
| Election | Leader | Chamber of Deputies | | | |
| Election | Leader | Votes | % | Seats | Position |
|---|---|---|---|---|---|
| 2018 | Andrea Dusi | 37,354 | 0.11 | 0 / 630 | 18th |

== Symbols ==
Official logo

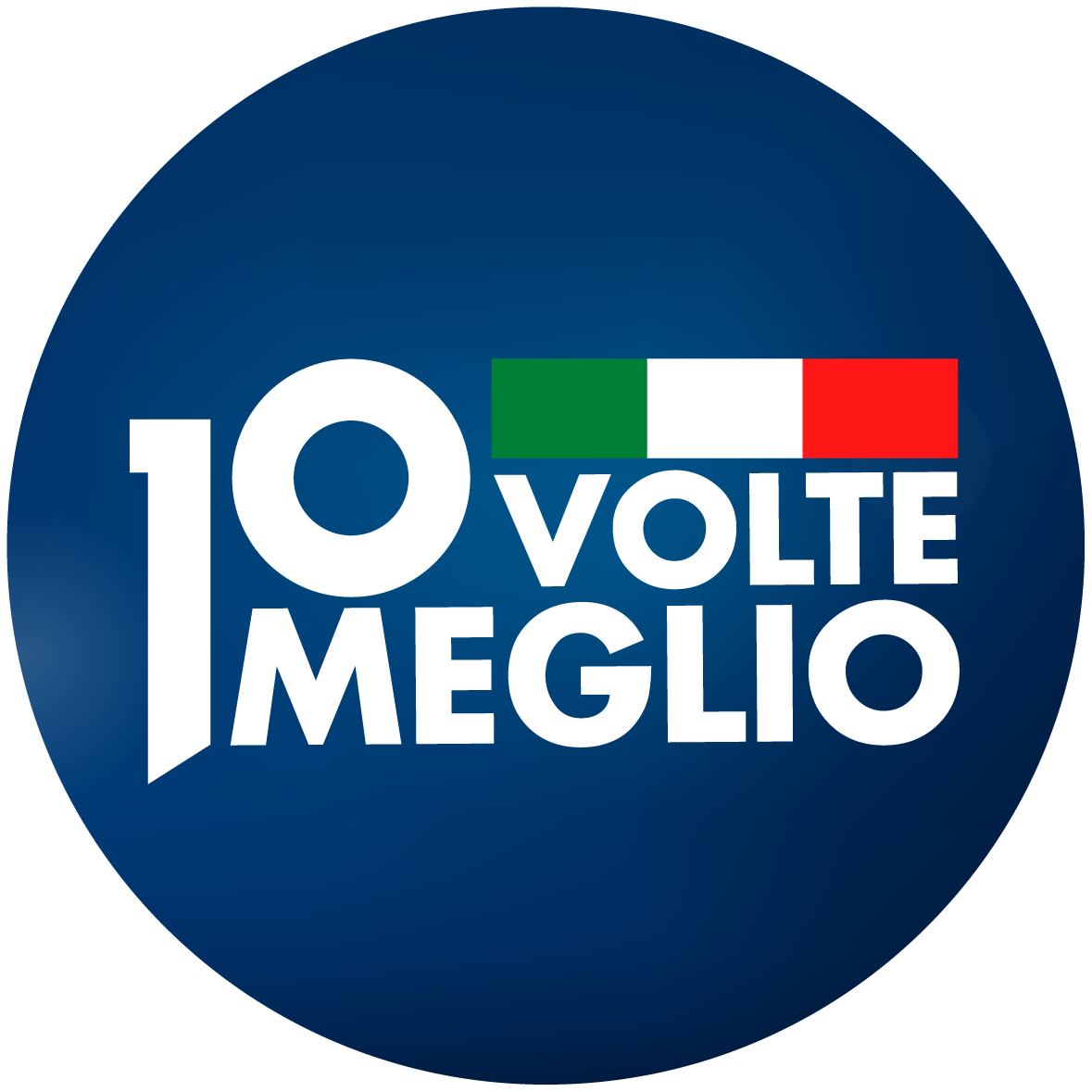
Logo in use between 2021 and 2022
