= Renato Turano =

Italian politician (1942–2021)

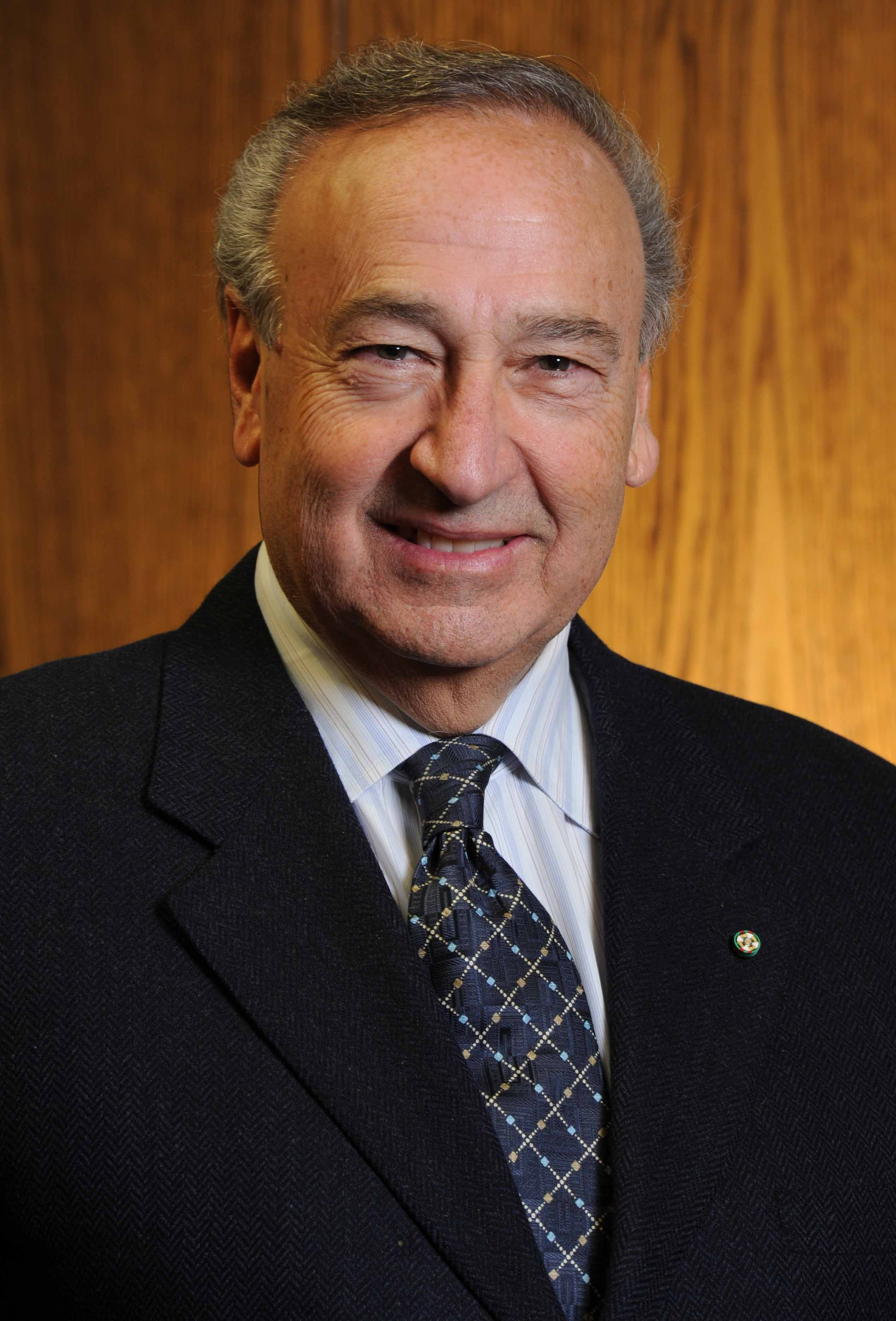
Renato Turano

Renato Guerino Turano (2 October 1942 – 5 December 2021) was an Italian and American politician and businessman. He served in the Italian Senate from 2006 to 2008 as a representative of Italian citizens in North and Central America and was re-elected to the same position in the 2013 Italian general election.

== Early life and private career ==
Turano was born in Castrolibero, Calabria, Italy, and moved to the United States with his family at age fifteen. He attended the University of Illinois at Chicago from 1962 to 1966 and returned in 1990 for a Master of Business Administration (MBA) degree. Turano also held an Honorary Doctorate in Letters from the University of Wisconsin-Parkside.

Turano's family purchased a small Chicago baking company in 1962, renamed it as the Turano Baking Company, and eventually built it into one of the largest artisan bread producers in North America. Turano worked for the company in his youth and became its president and chief executive officer in 1982. He served as chair of the American Bakers Associations (ABA) in the 2000s and led a march of eighty bakers to Capitol Hill to lobby for sector relief during a commodity crisis affecting wheat. In 2009, he was described as one of the twenty most influential baking managers in America.

Turano has been active in the Italian-American community for several decades. He founded Chicago's Casa Italia, served on the National Italian American Foundation (NAIF), and from 1996 to 2006 was an American consulate to the Region of Calabria, representing Calabrian Americans at annual conferences in Italy. Turano received a special achievement award from the NIAF for public service in 2007.

== Senator ==
Turano was elected to the Italian Senate in the 2006 general election, the first in which persons with Italian citizenship living overseas were able to elect their own representatives. Turano was elected to represent voters in North and Central America, and he credited Canadian support as vital to his victory. His party, Romano Prodi's The Union, won the election, and Turano helped consolidate its narrow majority in the Senate. A political moderate, he defended the Prodi administration's centrist course in a 2006 interview with the Chicago Tribune, saying that the government was shifting Italy from its recent "quasi-socialistic" history.

Turano sought re-election in the 2008 general election, but was unsuccessful. Turano actually received more first preference votes than any other candidate in North and Central America, but the governing coalition's party list (renamed as the Democratic Party) narrowly lost to Silvio Berlusconi's People of Freedom.

He was re-elected in the 2013 general election, again as a candidate of the Democratic Party.

== Electoral record ==
2008 Italian general election results: Senate, North and Central America region

Party	Votes	%	Senators
People of Freedom	38,896	44.96	1
Democratic Party	38,103	44.04	
Union of the Centre	7,330	8.47	
The Right–Tricolour Flame	2,193	2.53	
Total valid votes	86,522	100.00	

People of Freedom candidate preference votes
Basilio Giordano (elected)	13,083
Augusto Sorriso	8,699

Democratic Party candidate preference votes
Renato Turano (incumbent)	15,223
Marina Piazzi	7,431

Union of the Centre candidate preference votes
Massimo Seracini	2,194
Vittorio Coco	1,791

The Right–Tricolour Flame candidate preference votes
Giuseppe Cirnigliaro	544
Franco Misuraca	461

Source: ARCHIVIO STORICO DELLE ELEZIONI - Consultazione dati: Senato 13/04/2008, Area ESTERO, Ripartizione AMERICA SETTENTRIONALE E CENTRALE, Ministerio dell'Interno, Government of Italy, accessed 27 July 2011. Voters were not required to give a preference vote for any candidate.

2006 Italian general election results: Senate, North and Central America region

Party	Votes	%	Senators
The Union	32,036	38.03	1
Forza Italia	25,556	30.33	
For Italy in the World with Tremaglia	11,604	13.77	
Union of Christian and Centre Democrats	9,412	11.17	
Independent Alternative for Italians Abroad	3,191	3.79	
Northern League	1,389	1.65	
Tricolour Flame	1,061	1.26	
Total valid votes	84,249	100.00	

The Union candidate preference votes
Renato Turano (elected)	12,097
Rocco di Trolio	7,675

Forza Italia candidate preference votes
Augusto Sorriso	8,898
Liborio Zambito	5,387

For Italy in the World with Tremaglia candidate preference votes
Carlo Consiglio	5,446
Vincenzo Centofanti	2,531

Union of Christian and Centre Democrats candidate preference votes
Vittorio Coco	3,906
Bernardo Paradiso	2,885

Independent Alternative for Italians Abroad candidate preference votes
Domenico Serafini detto Dom	1,471
Sonia Marcella Spadoni	922

Northern League candidate preference votes
Salvatore Rappa	807

Tricolour Flame candidate preference votes
Alfredo Viti	415

Source: ARCHIVIO STORICO DELLE ELEZIONI - Consultazione dati: Senato 09/04/2006, Area ESTERO, Ripartizione AMERICA SETTENTRIONALE E CENTRALE, Ministerio dell'Interno, Government of Italy, accessed 27 July 2011. Voters were not required to give a preference vote for any candidate.
