= 2006 Italian Chamber of Deputies election, North and Central American division =

The 2006 Italian general election was the first in the country's history in which Italian and dual citizens living outside the country could vote by postal ballot in international electoral districts. Twelve members of the Italian Chamber of Deputies and six members of the Italian Senate were elected in this way.

Italian and dual citizens in North America and Central America (including the Caribbean) elected two members of the Italian Chamber of Deputies. The winning candidates were Gino Bucchino of Romano Prodi's election coalition, The Union, and Salvatore Ferrigno of Silvio Berlusconi's Forza Italia party.

== The process ==
All electors could vote for a political list and also cast a first preference vote for a specific candidate. Parties were allotted seats via proportional representation, and the candidates that led the electoral slates that won seats were declared elected.

== The parties ==
Seven electoral lists contested the North and Central American Senate division. The same lists also fielded candidates for the Chamber of Deputies and North and Central America.

Prime minister Silvio Berlusconi's right-wing Forza Italia party ran its own slate. Two other parties aligned with Berlusconi's government ran separate lists: the moderate conservative Union of Christian and Centre Democrats and Mirko Tremaglia's right-wing For Italy in the World, which was specifically focused on diaspora issues. (Another party in Berlusconi's coalition, the Northern League, also appeared on the ballot, although this seems to have been due to a technical error).

The main opposition group from the previous parliament, Romano Prodi's centre-left Union party, ran a united slate. One of the Union candidates noted that the state of the party lists favoured his group's chances of election.

The centrist Independent Alternative for Italians Abroad also fielded a list, as did the far-right Tricolour Flame party.

Each of the party lists comprised four candidates, except for the Northern League, which fielded three, and the Tricolour Flame, which fielded two.

== The results ==
Romano Prodi's Union received the most votes and won the first seat. Forza Italia finished second and was awarded the second seat.

2006 Italian general election results: Chamber of Deputies, North and Central America region

Party	Votes	%	Deputies
The Union	33,881	38.72	1
Forza Italia	26,843	30.68	1
For Italy in the World with Tremaglia	10,897	12.45	
Union of Christian and Centre Democrats	9,494	10.85	
Independent Alternative for Italians Abroad	3,732	4.26	
Northern League	1,461	1.67	
Tricolour Flame	1,197	1.37	
Total valid votes	87,505	100.00	

The Union candidate preference votes
Gino Bucchino (elected)	10,361
Giovanni Rapana'	8,626
Silvana Mangione	8,086
Graziella Ciminata Bivona	4,502

Forza Italia candidate preference votes
Salvatore Ferrigno (elected)	10,492
Liliana Bartolotta	4,717
Paolo Antonio Ariemma	4,427
Angela Della Costanza Turner	3,392

For Italy in the World with Tremaglia candidate preference votes
Antonio Cardillo	3,593
Anna Colarusso	2,950
Angelo Vinciguerra	2,362
Quintino Cianfaglione	1,634

Union of Christian and Centre Democrats candidate preference votes
Giuseppe Canciani	3,877
Domenico Mignone	2,696
Gaetano Mattioli Cecchini	1,202
Massimo Seracini	916

Independent Alternative for Italians Abroad candidate preference votes
John Adamo	1,947
Paolo de Francesco	685
Francesco de Leo	648
Antonino Massana	408

Northern League candidate preference votes
Guido Renzi	541
Stefano Bagnasco	431
Natale Salvatore Caruso	312

Tricolour Flame candidate preference votes
Giorgio Viti	382
Vito Verzura	351

Source: ARCHIVIO STORICO DELLE ELEZIONI - Consultazione dati: Camera 09/04/2006, Area ESTERO, Ripartizione AMERICA SETTENTRIONALE E CENTRALE, Ministerio dell'Interno, Government of Italy, accessed 27 July 2011. Voters were not required to give a preference vote for any candidate.

== Detailed results by country ==
More than 93 per cent of the total votes were cast in the United States of America or Canada. Forza Italia won a narrow victory in America, while the Union won a significant victory in Canada.

=== Antigua and Barbuda ===
Party	Votes	%
For Italy in the World with Tremaglia	0	0.00
Union of Christian and Centre Democrats	0	0.00
Forza Italia	0	0.00
The Union	0	0.00
Tricolour Flame	0	0.00
Independent Alternative for Italians Abroad	0	0.00
Northern League	0	0.00
Total valid votes	0	0.00

=== Bahamas ===
Party	Votes	%
Forza Italia	23	53.49
The Union	12	27.91
Northern League	2	4.65
Union of Christian and Centre Democrats	2	4.65
Independent Alternative for Italians Abroad	2	4.65
For Italy in the World with Tremaglia	2	4.65
Tricolour Flame	0	0.00
Total valid votes	43	0.05

=== Barbados ===
Party	Votes	%
For Italy in the World with Tremaglia	0	0.00
Union of Christian and Centre Democrats	0	0.00
Forza Italia	0	0.00
The Union	0	0.00
Tricolour Flame	0	0.00
Independent Alternative for Italians Abroad	0	0.00
Northern League	0	0.00
Total valid votes	0	0.00

=== Belize ===
Party	Votes	%
For Italy in the World with Tremaglia	0	0.00
Union of Christian and Centre Democrats	0	0.00
Forza Italia	0	0.00
The Union	0	0.00
Tricolour Flame	0	0.00
Independent Alternative for Italians Abroad	0	0.00
Northern League	0	0.00
Total valid votes	0	0.00

=== Canada ===
Party	Votes	%
The Union	17,099	48.21
Forza Italia	8,802	24.82
Union of Christian and Centre Democrats	4,293	12.10
For Italy in the World with Tremaglia	3,751	10.58
Independent Alternative for Italians Abroad	761	2.15
Northern League	499	1.41
Tricolour Flame	264	0.74
Total valid votes	35,469	40.53

=== Costa Rica ===
Party	Votes	%
Forza Italia	328	39.95
The Union	239	29.11
For Italy in the World with Tremaglia	75	9.14
Independent Alternative for Italians Abroad	65	7.92
Union of Christian and Centre Democrats	48	5.85
Tricolour Flame	48	5.85
Northern League	18	2.19
Total valid votes	821	0.94

=== Dominican Republic ===
Party	Votes	%
Forza Italia	474	24.25
The Union	308	37.32
For Italy in the World with Tremaglia	256	20.16
Union of Christian and Centre Democrats	86	6.77
Independent Alternative for Italians Abroad	43	3.39
Tricolour Flame	53	4.17
Northern League	50	3.94
Total valid votes	1,270	1.45

=== El Salvador ===
Party	Votes	%
Forza Italia	168	48.98
The Union	89	25.95
Union of Christian and Centre Democrats	30	8.75
Tricolour Flame	24	7.00
For Italy in the World with Tremaglia	16	4.66
Independent Alternative for Italians Abroad	14	4.08
Northern League	2	0.58
Total valid votes	343	0.39

=== Grenada ===
Party	Votes	%
For Italy in the World with Tremaglia	0	0.00
Union of Christian and Centre Democrats	0	0.00
Forza Italia	0	0.00
The Union	0	0.00
Tricolour Flame	0	0.00
Independent Alternative for Italians Abroad	0	0.00
Northern League	0	0.00
Total valid votes	0	0.00

=== Guatemala ===
Party	Votes	%
Forza Italia	462	53.66
The Union	202	23.46
Independent Alternative for Italians Abroad	60	6.97
For Italy in the World with Tremaglia	48	5.57
Union of Christian and Centre Democrats	45	5.23
Northern League	22	2.56
Tricolour Flame	22	2.56
Total valid votes	861	0.98

=== Haiti ===
Party	Votes	%
The Union	9	50.00
Union of Christian and Centre Democrats	7	38.89
Forza Italia	1	5.56
For Italy in the World with Tremaglia	1	5.56
Independent Alternative for Italians Abroad	0	0.00
Tricolour Flame	0	0.00
Northern League	0	0.00
Total valid votes	18	0.02

=== Honduras ===
Party	Votes	%
Forza Italia	55	48.25
The Union	22	19.30
For Italy in the World with Tremaglia	9	7.89
Union of Christian and Centre Democrats	9	7.89
Tricolour Flame	8	7.02
Independent Alternative for Italians Abroad	7	6.14
Northern League	4	3.51
Total valid votes	114	0.13

=== Mexico ===
Party	Votes	%
The Union	734	37.76
Forza Italia	573	29.48
Union of Christian and Centre Democrats	192	9.88
Independent Alternative for Italians Abroad	178	9.16
For Italy in the World with Tremaglia	145	7.46
Northern League	68	3.50
Tricolour Flame	54	2.78
Total valid votes	1,944	2.22

=== Nicaragua ===
Party	Votes	%
The Union	88	46.07
Forza Italia	58	30.37
Union of Christian and Centre Democrats	18	9.42
For Italy in the World with Tremaglia	17	8.90
Tricolour Flame	8	4.19
Independent Alternative for Italians Abroad	2	1.05
Northern League	0	0.00
Total valid votes	191	0.22

=== Panama ===
Party	Votes	%
Forza Italia	94	46.08
The Union	54	26.47
For Italy in the World with Tremaglia	35	17.16
Independent Alternative for Italians Abroad	8	3.92
Union of Christian and Centre Democrats	6	2.94
Tricolour Flame	6	2.94
Northern League	1	0.49
Total valid votes	204	0.23

=== United States of America ===
Party	Votes	%
Forza Italia	15,805	34.19
The Union	15,025	32.50
For Italy in the World with Tremaglia	6,542	14.15
Union of Christian and Centre Democrats	4,758	10.29
Independent Alternative for Italians Abroad	2,592	5.61
Northern League	795	1.72
Tricolour Flame	710	1.54
Total valid votes	46,227	52.83

Source: ARCHIVIO STORICO DELLE ELEZIONI - Consultazione dati: Camera 09/04/2006, Area ESTERO, Ripartizione AMERICA SETTENTRIONALE E CENTRALE, Ministerio dell'Interno, Government of Italy, accessed 27 July 2011.
