= Vittorio Coco =

Italian-Canadian journalist and politician

Vittorio Coco (born November 11, 1939) is an Italian and Canadian journalist and politician. He has worked at CHIN radio in Toronto since 1973 and was for many years the host of an Italian-language morning program. Coco ran for the Italian Senate in the 2006 and 2008 general elections.

== Early life and career ==
Coco was born in Roccagorga, a small town near Rome. He studied journalism in Rome and worked in print media after graduating.

He moved to Edmonton, Alberta, Canada, in 1959 and intended to start an Italian-language newspaper in the city (at the time, he has noted, there were no Italian journals in Canada west of Winnipeg). He instead became involved in radio, overseeing Italian-language programming at the Canadian Broadcasting Corporation's CHFA in Edmonton and broadcasting from Expo '67 in Montreal, Quebec.

== Toronto broadcaster ==
Coco joined CHIN radio in Toronto in 1972 as its news director. Later in the same year, he became the debut host of "Wake-Up Italian Style," the station's Italian-language morning show. He celebrated his twenty-sixth year on the air in 1998, excepting a short period of time in the 1970s when he hosted an afternoon program. Under Coco's watch, "Wake-Up Italian Style" featured a combination of music and spoken-word content, including new hit material from Italy. Coco has also worked for "Festival Italiano di Johnny Lombardi" program on CHIN-TV.

== Politician ==
Coco ran for the Italian Senate in the 2006 and 2008 general elections in a division reserved for Italian citizens living in North American and Central America. He was a candidate of the Union of Christian and Centre Democrats in 2006 and ran for its successor party, the Union of the Centre, in 2008. He was defeated on both occasions. Coco received credible support in Toronto in 2006, but did not poll well elsewhere.

Coco identifies as a Roman Catholic and has said he has always supported the Christian Democrats and successor parties in Italian politics. He has served as the Union of the Centre's political secretary in Canada.

== Electoral record ==
2008 Italian general election results: Senate, North and Central America region

Party	Votes	%	Senators
People of Freedom	38,896	44.96	1
Democratic Party	38,103	44.04	
Union of the Centre	7,330	8.47	
The Right–Tricolour Flame	2,193	2.53	
Total valid votes	86,522	100.00	

People of Freedom candidate preference votes
Basilio Giordano (elected)	13,083
Augusto Sorriso	8,699

Democratic Party candidate preference votes
Renato Turano (incumbent)	15,223
Marina Piazzi	7,431

Union of the Centre candidate preference votes
Massimo Seracini	2,194
Vittorio Coco	1,791

The Right–Tricolour Flame candidate preference votes
Giuseppe Cirnigliaro	544
Franco Misuraca	461

Source: ARCHIVIO STORICO DELLE ELEZIONI - Consultazione dati: Senato 13/04/2008, Area ESTERO, Ripartizione AMERICA SETTENTRIONALE E CENTRALE, Ministerio dell'Interno, Government of Italy, accessed 27 July 2011. Voters were not required to give a preference vote for any candidate.

2006 Italian general election results: Senate, North and Central America region

Party	Votes	%	Senators
The Union	32,036	38.03	1
Forza Italia	25,556	30.33	
For Italy in the World with Tremaglia	11,604	13.77	
Union of Christian and Centre Democrats	9,412	11.17	
Independent Alternative for Italians Abroad	3,191	3.79	
Northern League	1,389	1.65	
Tricolour Flame	1,061	1.26	
Total valid votes	84,249	100.00	

The Union candidate preference votes
Renato Turano (elected)	12,097
Rocco di Trolio	7,675

Forza Italia candidate preference votes
Augusto Sorriso	8,898
Liborio Zambito	5,387

For Italy in the World with Tremaglia candidate preference votes
Carlo Consiglio	5,446
Vincenzo Centofanti	2,531

Union of Christian and Centre Democrats candidate preference votes
Vittorio Coco	3,906
Bernardo Paradiso	2,885

Independent Alternative for Italians Abroad candidate preference votes
Domenico Serafini detto Dom	1,471
Sonia Marcella Spadoni	922

Northern League candidate preference votes
Salvatore Rappa	807

Tricolour Flame candidate preference votes
Alfredo Viti	415

Source: ARCHIVIO STORICO DELLE ELEZIONI - Consultazione dati: Senato 09/04/2006, Area ESTERO, Ripartizione AMERICA SETTENTRIONALE E CENTRALE, Ministerio dell'Interno, Government of Italy, accessed 27 July 2011. Voters were not required to give a preference vote for any candidate.
