= Independent Alternative for Italians Abroad =

Italian political party

Independent Alternative for Italians Abroad Alternativa Indipendente Italiani all'Estero
- Leader: John Adamo; Dom Serafini
- Founded: 17 November 2005
- Dissolved: c. 2006
- Ideology: Interests of Italians abroad
- Political position: Centre

The Independent Alternative for Italians Abroad (Italian: Alternativa Indipendente Italiani all'Estero; AIIE) was a party list that contested the 2006 Italian general election in the overseas division of North America and Central America. It ran four candidates for the Chamber of Deputies and two candidates for the Italian Senate. The party did not win any seats.

The AIIE supported improvements in consular and health-care services for Italians living abroad, and was generally focused on interactions between Italy and the country's diaspora population. One candidate for the Italian Chamber of Deputies indicated that the party was neither right-wing nor left-wing, and that it opposed bureaucracy while supporting freedom for both the individual and society. Another party candidate for the Italian Senate said that the AIIE was seeking to reach an electorate of moderate and undecided voters.

== Electoral record ==
2006 Italian general election results: Chamber of Deputies, North and Central America region

| Party | Votes | % | Deputies |
|---|---|---|---|
| The Union | 33,881 | 38.72 | 1 |
| Forza Italia | 26,843 | 30.68 | 1 |
| For Italy in the World with Tremaglia | 10,897 | 12.45 | |
| Union of Christian and Centre Democrats | 9,494 | 10.85 | |
| Independent Alternative for Italians Abroad | 3,732 | 4.26 | |
| Northern League | 1,461 | 1.67 | |
| Tricolour Flame | 1,197 | 1.37 | |
| Total valid votes | 87,505 | 100.00 | |

The Union candidate preference votes
| Gino Bucchino (elected) | 10,361 |
| Giovanni Rapana' | 8,626 |
| Silvana Mangione | 8,086 |
| Graziella Ciminata Bivona | 4,502 |

Forza Italia candidate preference votes
| Salvatore Ferrigno (elected) | 10,492 |
| Liliana Bartolotta | 4,717 |
| Paolo Antonio Ariemma | 4,427 |
| Angela Della Costanza Turner | 3,392 |

For Italy in the World with Tremaglia candidate preference votes
| Antonio Cardillo | 3,593 |
| Anna Colarusso | 2,950 |
| Angelo Vinciguerra | 2,362 |
| Quintino Cianfaglione | 1,634 |

Union of Christian and Centre Democrats candidate preference votes
| Giuseppe Canciani | 3,877 |
| Domenico Mignone | 2,696 |
| Gaetano Mattioli Cecchini | 1,202 |
| Massimo Seracini | 916 |

Independent Alternative for Italians Abroad candidate preference votes
| John Adamo | 1,947 |
| Paolo de Francesco | 685 |
| Francesco de Leo | 648 |
| Antonino Massana | 408 |

Northern League candidate preference votes
| Guido Renzi | 541 |
| Stefano Bagnasco | 431 |
| Natale Salvatore Caruso | 312 |

Tricolour Flame candidate preference votes
| Giorgio Viti | 382 |
| Vito Verzura | 351 |

Source: ARCHIVIO STORICO DELLE ELEZIONI - Consultazione dati: Camera 09/04/2006, Area ESTERO, Ripartizione AMERICA SETTENTRIONALE E CENTRALE, Ministerio dell'Interno, Government of Italy, accessed 27 July 2011. Voters were not required to give a preference vote for any candidate.

2006 Italian general election results: Senate, North and Central America region

| Party | Votes | % | Senators |
|---|---|---|---|
| The Union | 32,036 | 38.03 | 1 |
| Forza Italia | 25,556 | 30.33 | |
| For Italy in the World with Tremaglia | 11,604 | 13.77 | |
| Union of Christian and Centre Democrats | 9,412 | 11.17 | |
| Independent Alternative for Italians Abroad | 3,191 | 3.79 | |
| Northern League | 1,389 | 1.65 | |
| Tricolour Flame | 1,061 | 1.26 | |
| Total valid votes | 84,249 | 100.00 | |

The Union candidate preference votes
| Renato Turano (elected) | 12,097 |
| Rocco di Trolio | 7,675 |

Forza Italia candidate preference votes
| Augusto Sorriso | 8,898 |
| Liborio Zambito | 5,387 |

For Italy in the World with Tremaglia candidate preference votes
| Carlo Consiglio | 5,446 |
| Vincenzo Centofanti | 2,531 |

Union of Christian and Centre Democrats candidate preference votes
| Vittorio Coco | 3,906 |
| Bernardo Paradiso | 2,885 |

Independent Alternative for Italians Abroad candidate preference votes
| Domenico Serafini detto Dom | 1,471 |
| Sonia Marcella Spadoni | 922 |

Northern League candidate preference votes
| Salvatore Rappa | 807 |

Tricolour Flame candidate preference votes
| Alfredo Viti | 415 |

Source: ARCHIVIO STORICO DELLE ELEZIONI - Consultazione dati: Senato 09/04/2006, Area ESTERO, Ripartizione AMERICA SETTENTRIONALE E CENTRALE, Ministerio dell'Interno, Government of Italy, accessed 27 July 2011. Voters were not required to give a preference vote for any candidate.
