= 2006 Italian Senate election, North and Central American division =

The 2006 Italian general election was the first in the country's history in which Italian and dual citizens living outside the country could vote by postal ballot in international electoral districts. Twelve members of the Italian Chamber of Deputies and six members of the Italian Senate were elected in this way.

Italian and dual citizens in North America and Central America (including the Caribbean) elected one member of the Italian Senate. The winning candidate was Renato Turano of Romano Prodi's election coalition, The Union.

== The process ==
All electors could vote for a political list and also cast a first preference vote for a specific candidate. The party with the highest number of list votes won the Senate seat, and the winning party's candidate with the most first preference votes was declared elected.

== The parties ==
Seven electoral lists contested the North and Central American Senate division. The same lists also fielded candidates for the Chamber of Deputies and North and Central America.

Prime minister Silvio Berlusconi's right-wing Forza Italia party ran its own slate. Two other parties aligned with Berlusconi's government ran separate lists: the moderate conservative Union of Christian and Centre Democrats and Mirko Tremaglia's right-wing For Italy in the World, which was specifically focused on diaspora issues. (Another party in Berlusconi's coalition, the Lega Nord, also appeared on the ballot, although this seems to have been due to a technical error).

The main opposition group from the previous parliament, Romano Prodi's centre-left Union party, ran a united slate. One of the Union candidates noted that the state of the party lists favoured his group's chances of election.

The centrist Independent Alternative for Italians Abroad also fielded a list, as did the far-right Tricolour Flame party.

Each of the party lists comprised two candidates, except for the Northern League and Tricolour Flame which fielded one apiece.

== The candidates ==
=== The Union ===
- Renato Turano is a Chicago baking executive who was active in the Italian expatriate community for several years before his election. He served in the Italian Senate from 2006 to 2008.
- Rocco di Trolio was born in Calabritto, Italy. He moved to the United Kingdom at age seventeen and became active with the British Labour Party, also serving as secretary of the Italian Socialist Party in England. He joined the Italian overseas social services agency in 1981 and moved to Vancouver, British Columbia, Canada, in 1990, where he oversaw the city's Italian-Canadian social services bureau. Di Trolio became a dual Italian-Canadian citizen in 1994. He sought the New Democratic Party nomination for Vancouver East in the 1997 Canadian federal election, narrowly losing to veteran municipal politician Libby Davies. In 2004, he topped the polls in an election for Canada's Committee of Italians Abroad, a fifteen-member board whose purpose is to promote Italian culture.

=== Forza Italia ===
- Augusto Sorriso was a municipal politician in Licata, Sicily, before moving to New Jersey in 1994. He also ran as a candidate of Berlusconi's People of Freedom party in the 2008 Senate election.
- Robert Liborio Zambito is a municipal politician in Montreal, Quebec, Canada. He was elected to the Montreal city council in 2009.

=== For Italy in the World ===
- Carlo Consiglio was fifty-four years old in 2006. Originally from the Naples area, he moved to Toronto, Ontario, Canada, in 1989. He has been active in the Italian expatriate community and has served with the General Council of Italians Abroad. In the 2006 campaign, he spoke against the legal recognition of same-sex marriage.
- Vincenzo Centofanti was born in Abruzzo and spent some of his youth in Ethiopia during the Italian occupation of that country. He was still in Ethiopia when it was liberated by the British in 1941, and he was held in British surveillance camps in Kenya and Tanganyika for the next six years. Repatriated to Italy in 1947, he received a law degree in 1954 and moved to Philadelphia three years later to rejoin his family. He worked as a banker and an Alitalia executive, and was retired by the time of the 2006 campaign. He has been active with the General Council of Italians Abroad and has served as president of the Federazione delle Associazioni Abruzzesi della Valle del Delaware.

=== Union of Christian and Centre Democrats ===
- Vittorio Coco is a broadcaster in Toronto, Ontario, Canada. He ran for the Italian Senate a second time in 2008 as a Union of the Centre candidate.
- Bernardo Paradiso is based in New York City and has worked with the Italian American Committee of Education.

=== Independent Alternative for Italians Abroad ===
- Dom (Domenico) Serafini was born in Giulianova, Abruzzo. He moved to the United States of America in 1968, at age eighteen, to attend Empire State College. He is a journalist and publisher based in New York City and is best known for publishing the television trade journal Video Age International. Serafini was one of the first declared candidates for the 2006 Senate election in North and Central America, and was described in an August 2005 article in The New York Times as an early front-runner. In January 2006, he was quoted as saying, ""My ideology is pragmatism. I'm not an ideologue. My job is to represent Italians overseas, not play politics." He later said that his primary mission if elected would be "squeez[ing] whatever is possible from Italian state and government funds for Italians overseas."
- Sonia Marcella Spadoni-Alioto was born in Ferrara and later moved to San Francisco. Forty-one years old in 2006, she has a background in law and accountancy and has provided assistance for Italians living overseas in accessing Italian state services.

=== Lega Nord ===
- Salvatore Rappa is initially from Sicily and lived in New York City in 2006. His appearance on the ballot as a Northern League candidate was due to a technical error; he had intended to run for the Movement for Autonomy led by Raffaele Lombardo.

=== Tricolour Flame ===
- Alfredo Viti was based in Miami.

== The results ==
Romano Prodi's Union received the most votes. Renato Turano received the most first preference votes from this list and was declared elected.

2006 Italian general election results: Senate, North and Central America region

Party	Votes	%	Senators
The Union	32,036	38.03	1
Forza Italia	25,556	30.33	
For Italy in the World with Tremaglia	11,604	13.77	
Union of Christian and Centre Democrats	9,412	11.17	
Independent Alternative for Italians Abroad	3,191	3.79	
Northern League	1,389	1.65	
Tricolour Flame	1,061	1.26	
Total valid votes	84,249	100.00	

The Union candidate preference votes
Renato Turano (elected)	12,097
Rocco di Trolio	7,675

Forza Italia candidate preference votes
Augusto Sorriso	8,898
Liborio Zambito	5,387

For Italy in the World with Tremaglia candidate preference votes
Carlo Consiglio	5,446
Vincenzo Centofanti	2,531

Union of Christian and Centre Democrats candidate preference votes
Vittorio Coco	3,906
Bernardo Paradiso	2,885

Independent Alternative for Italians Abroad candidate preference votes
Domenico Serafini detto Dom	1,471
Sonia Marcella Spadoni	922

Northern League candidate preference votes
Salvatore Rappa	807

Tricolour Flame candidate preference votes
Alfredo Viti	415

Source: ARCHIVIO STORICO DELLE ELEZIONI - Consultazione dati: Senato 09/04/2006, Area ESTERO, Ripartizione AMERICA SETTENTRIONALE E CENTRALE, Ministerio dell'Interno, Government of Italy, accessed 27 July 2011. Voters were not required to give a preference vote for any candidate.

== Detailed results by country ==
More than ninety-five per cent of votes cast in this election were from the United States of America or Canada. The American result was a virtual tie between Berlusconi's list and Prodi's list. In Canada, Prodi's list won a significant victory. Renato Turano credited the Canadian turnout as vital for his election.

=== Antigua and Barbuda ===
Party	Votes	%
For Italy in the World	0	0.00
Union of Christian and Centre Democrats	0	0.00
Forza Italia	0	0.00
The Union	0	0.00
Tricolour Flame	0	0.00
Independent Alternative for Italians Abroad	0	0.00
Lega Nord	0	0.00
Total valid votes	0	0.00

=== Bahamas ===
Party	Votes	%
Forza Italia	24	60.00
The Union	10	25.00
Independent Alternative for Italians Abroad	2	5.00
Union of Christian and Centre Democrats	2	5.00
For Italy in the World	1	2.50
Lega Nord	1	2.50
Tricolour Flame	0	0.00
Total valid votes	40	0.05

=== Barbados ===
Party	Votes	%
For Italy in the World	0	0.00
Union of Christian and Centre Democrats	0	0.00
Forza Italia	0	0.00
The Union	0	0.00
Tricolour Flame	0	0.00
Independent Alternative for Italians Abroad	0	0.00
Lega Nord	0	0.00
Total valid votes	0	0.00

=== Belize ===
Party	Votes	%
For Italy in the World	0	0.00
Union of Christian and Centre Democrats	0	0.00
Forza Italia	0	0.00
The Union	0	0.00
Tricolour Flame	0	0.00
Independent Alternative for Italians Abroad	0	0.00
Lega Nord	0	0.00
Total valid votes	0	0.00

=== Canada ===
Party	Votes	%
The Union	15,409	44.36
Forza Italia	8,504	24.48
For Italy in the World	4,786	13.78
Union of Christian and Centre Democrats	4,454	12.82
Independent Alternative for Italians Abroad	852	2.45
Lega Nord	495	1.42
Tricolour Flame	240	0.69
Total valid votes	34,740	41.23

=== Costa Rica ===
Party	Votes	%
Forza Italia	288	38.50
The Union	211	28.21
For Italy in the World	81	10.83
Independent Alternative for Italians Abroad	67	8.96
Union of Christian and Centre Democrats	44	5.88
Tricolour Flame	42	5.61
Lega Nord	15	2.01
Total valid votes	748	0.89

=== Dominican Republic ===
Party	Votes	%
The Union	47	45.63
Forza Italia	24	23.30
For Italy in the World	14	13.59
Union of Christian and Centre Democrats	12	11.65
Independent Alternative for Italians Abroad	4	3.88
Tricolour Flame	1	0.97
Lega Nord	1	0.97
Total valid votes	103	0.12

=== El Salvador ===
Party	Votes	%
Forza Italia	138	46.00
The Union	85	28.33
Union of Christian and Centre Democrats	28	9.33
Tricolour Flame	22	7.33
For Italy in the World	14	4.67
Independent Alternative for Italians Abroad	10	3.33
Lega Nord	3	1.00
Total valid votes	300	0.36

=== Grenada ===
Party	Votes	%
For Italy in the World	0	0.00
Union of Christian and Centre Democrats	0	0.00
Forza Italia	0	0.00
The Union	0	0.00
Tricolour Flame	0	0.00
Independent Alternative for Italians Abroad	0	0.00
Lega Nord	0	0.00
Total valid votes	0	0.00

=== Guatemala ===
Party	Votes	%
Forza Italia	322	47.35
The Union	161	23.68
For Italy in the World	59	8.68
Independent Alternative for Italians Abroad	59	8.68
Union of Christian and Centre Democrats	40	5.88
Lega Nord	22	3.24
Tricolour Flame	17	2.50
Total valid votes	680	0.81

=== Haiti ===
Party	Votes	%
The Union	11	52.38
Union of Christian and Centre Democrats	7	33.33
Forza Italia	2	9.52
For Italy in the World	1	4.76
Independent Alternative for Italians Abroad	0	0.00
Tricolour Flame	0	0.00
Lega Nord	0	0.00
Total valid votes	21	0.02

=== Honduras ===
Party	Votes	%
Forza Italia	53	49.07
The Union	24	22.22
For Italy in the World	9	8.33
Union of Christian and Centre Democrats	8	7.41
Independent Alternative for Italians Abroad	7	6.48
Tricolour Flame	4	3.70
Lega Nord	3	2.78
Total valid votes	108	0.13

=== Mexico ===
Party	Votes	%
The Union	671	37.80
Forza Italia	502	28.28
Independent Alternative for Italians Abroad	180	10.14
Union of Christian and Centre Democrats	172	9.69
For Italy in the World	155	8.73
Tricolour Flame	50	2.82
Lega Nord	45	2.54
Total valid votes	1,775	2.11

=== Nicaragua ===
Party	Votes	%
The Union	78	46.43
Forza Italia	52	30.95
For Italy in the World	18	10.71
Union of Christian and Centre Democrats	13	7.74
Tricolour Flame	4	2.38
Independent Alternative for Italians Abroad	2	1.19
Lega Nord	1	0.60
Total valid votes	168	0.20

=== Panama ===
Party	Votes	%
Forza Italia	88	44.22
The Union	62	31.16
For Italy in the World	33	16.58
Independent Alternative for Italians Abroad	6	3.02
Union of Christian and Centre Democrats	4	2.01
Tricolour Flame	3	1.51
Lega Nord	3	1.51
Total valid votes	199	0.24

=== United States of America ===
Party	Votes	%
Forza Italia	15,559	34.30
The Union	15,267	33.65
For Italy in the World	6,433	14.18
Union of Christian and Centre Democrats	4,628	10.20
Independent Alternative for Italians Abroad	2,002	4.41
Lega Nord	800	1.76
Tricolour Flame	678	1.49
Total valid votes	45,367	53.85

Source: ARCHIVIO STORICO DELLE ELEZIONI - Consultazione dati: Senato 09/04/2006, Area ESTERO, Ripartizione AMERICA SETTENTRIONALE E CENTRALE, Ministerio dell'Interno, Government of Italy, accessed 27 July 2011.
