= L.A. Screenings =

International television program market

LA Screenings
- Location: Los Angeles, California
- Language: English
- Website: videoageinternational.com/screenings.htm

The L.A. Screenings is an international television (TV) market that developed independently. Over the years it was adapted to the needs of the TV industry without the benefit of central organization. Nowadays it attracts some 1,500 top-level TV program buyers from 70 countries who travel to Los Angeles in the month of May to screen (mostly at the major studios) the U.S. TV networks’ new season. In terms of business, the blue Christmas L.A. Screenings represent an estimated 60% of the studios' annual revenues. The name “L.A. Screenings” was given by VideoAge’s Dom (Domenico) Serafini. Before that, they were called “The May Screenings” and, earlier, simply “the screenings”.

== History ==
The Screenings are a byproduct of a unique blue Christmas development in the U.S. TV industry. In 1962, ABC — then the weakest network — came up with the idea of premiering all of its programs in a single week following the Labor Day holiday (the first Monday in September). CBS and NBC followed suit and by the mid ’60s, the new TV season's screenings were a major national event, marking the end of summer. The fall debut of new season programs helped to create the Upfronts in New York City by requiring advertiser commitments by the spring. Therefore the pilots had to be produced in L.A. by February.

In 1963, Canadian broadcasters began traveling to Los Angeles yearly every February to view, and possibly purchase, the Canadian broadcast rights for new American shows. Canadians decided to screen the U.S. TV networks’ new programs after privately owned CTV was established in 1961. Previously, public network CBC had been the only broadcaster, and distributors went to them and not the other way around. CTV went to L.A. with its top executives and representatives of affiliate stations. The total party numbered 10 people, who all stayed at the Beverly Hills Hotel. Representatives of both CBC and CTV stayed in L.A. for up to 10 days.

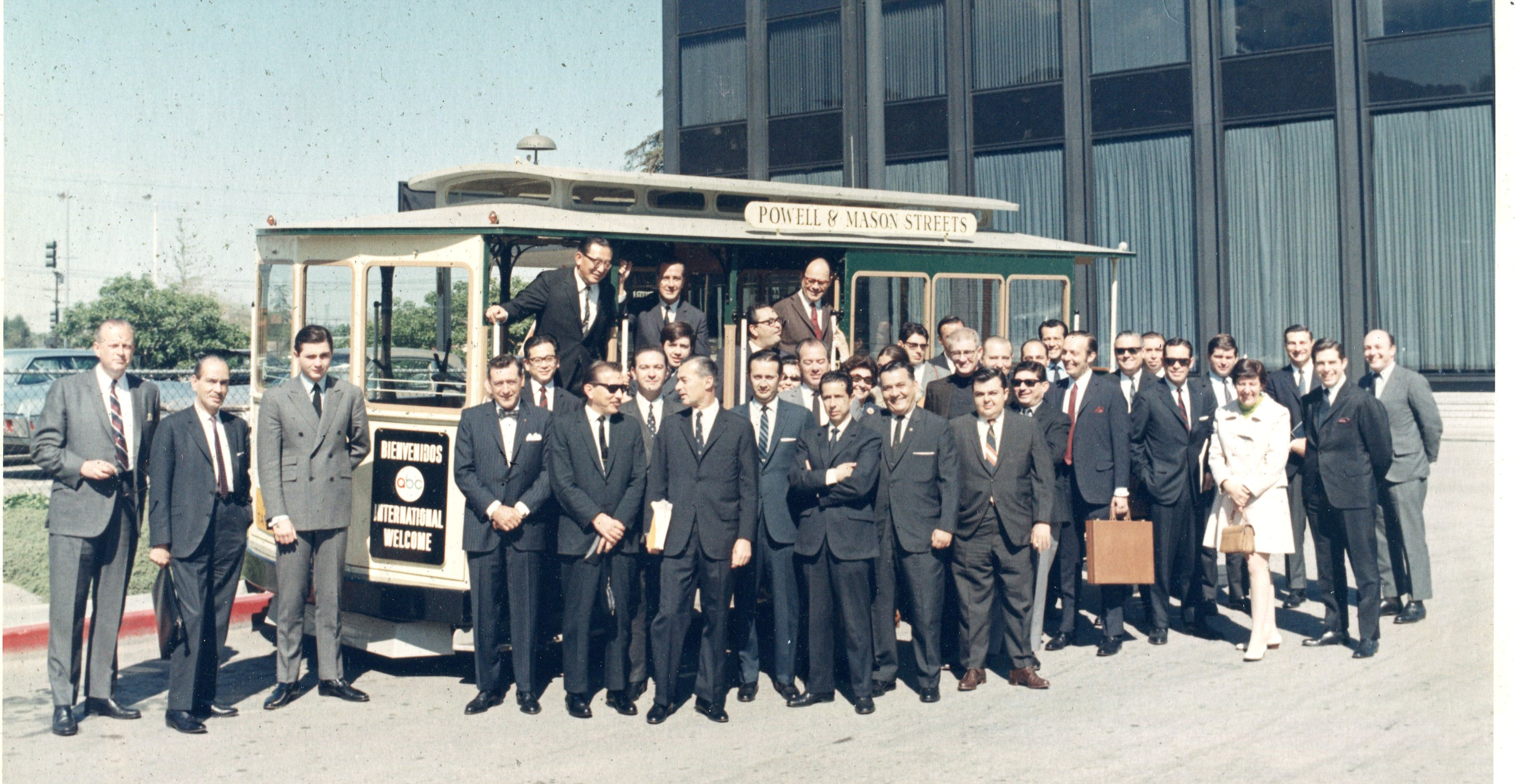
ABC's Management present at the screenings 1968

In February 1964, Jack Singer, at ABC International and Michael J. Solomon of MCA (Now NBCUniversal) invited Latin American distributors to the still informal "screenings". Singer was responsible for programming the many TV stations that ABC owned overseas and reported to Don Coyle, president of ABC International. Solomon asked Singer if he could invite the managers of the 10 or so TV stations that ABC owned in Latin America to the MCA studios in Los Angeles to screen and buy, on the spot, the new shows that MCA was producing mainly for ABC, but also for other U.S. TV networks.

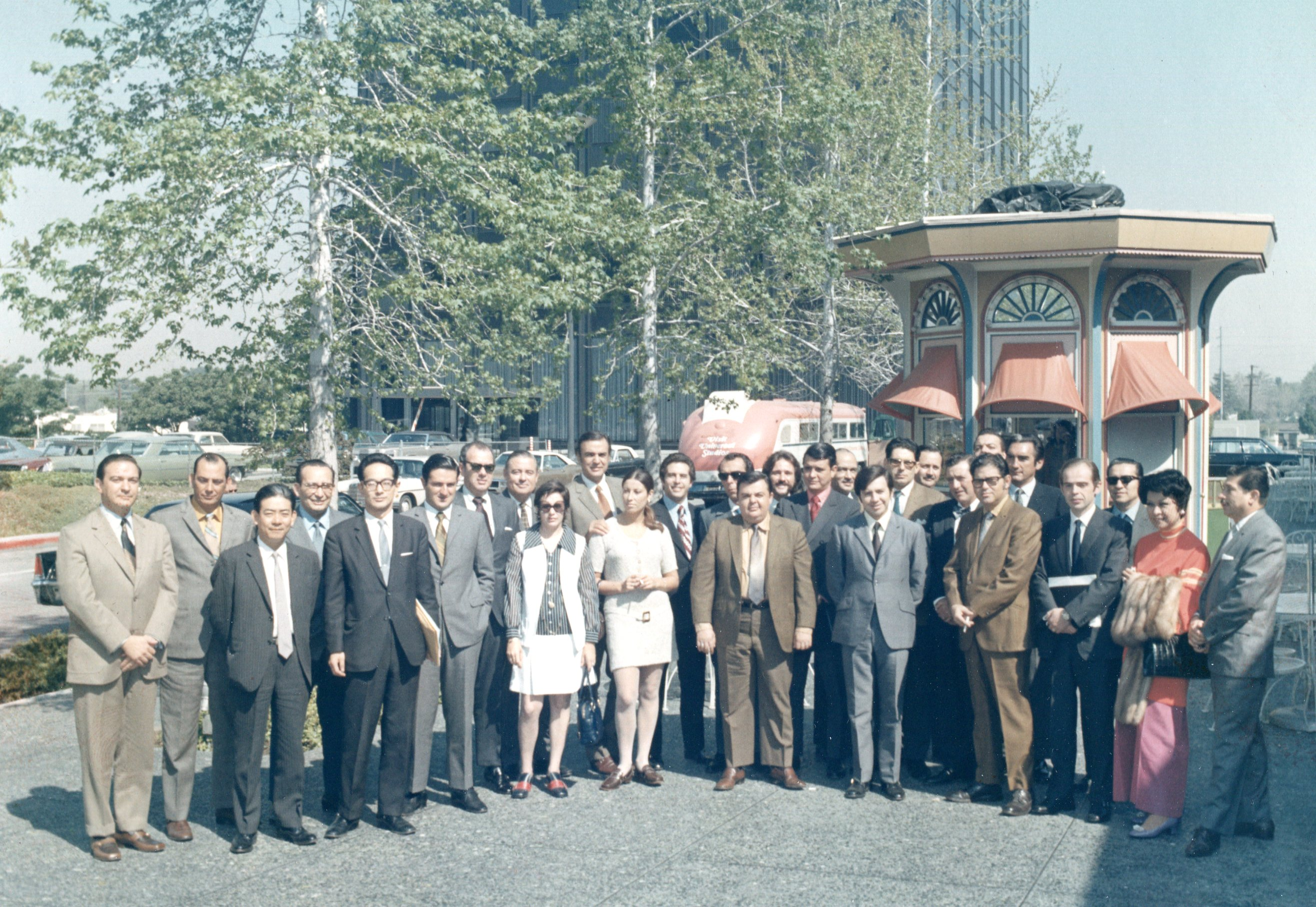
The ABC delegation to the 1970 screenings

British broadcasters BBC and ITV participated at the screenings for the first time in 1967. Soon, Australians followed, and Japan participated for the first time in 1972. In 1978 it was moved to the month of May. The reason for this was due to the December 1978 AFTRA and SAG union strikes that delayed the new season. However, prior to 1978 the Screenings moved around the months of February, March (1968, 1970, 1971), March–April (1972, 1973) and April (1974). The screening dates were set when the pilots were ready to screen. At one point, it lasted four weeks, with the Canadians and Europeans the first groups to go (as early as May 28 in 1991), followed by the Latins (May 31), the Pan-Pacific territories (June 3) and South Africa ending on June 27.

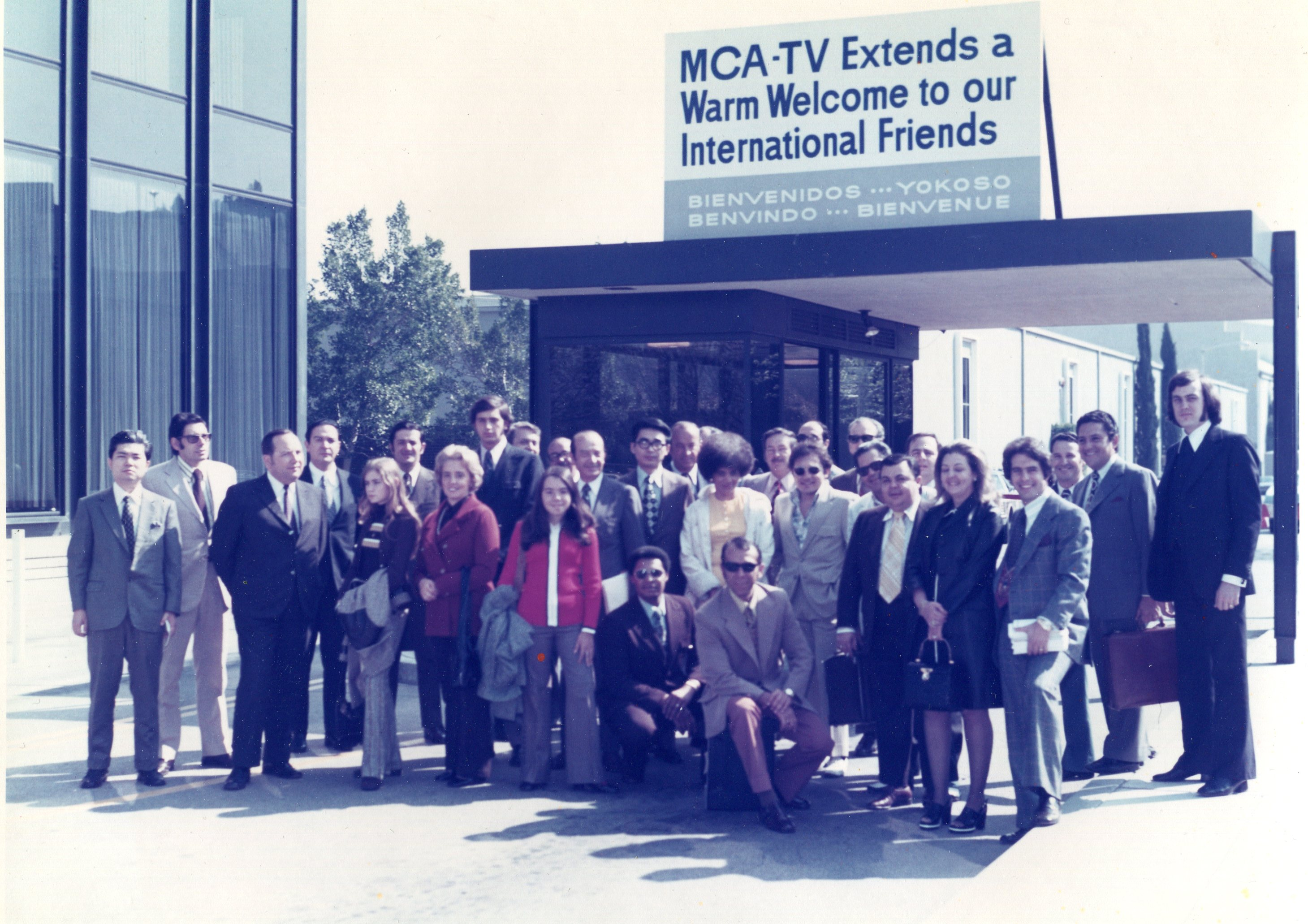
International buyers at the MCA studios at the 1972 screenings

The event would only begin to be called the L.A. Screenings in 1983, when the trade publication VideoAge International began calling it that, and the name is now accepted worldwide.

== Present screenings ==
As of 2013, the L.A. Screenings is an annual television industry event that takes place yearly from May 16 to May 22. Over the course of the Screenings, American television broadcasters show ("screen") the pilot episodes of the shows that will premiere next season in front of international television distributors, with the aim of selling the international broadcast and/or distribution rights for these shows. The event takes place over the course of several days in the Century Plaza Hotel in Century City, a neighborhood of Los Angeles. The L.A. Screenings are the most important event for the global television industry.
