= Sol J. Paul =

American broadcaster and publisher

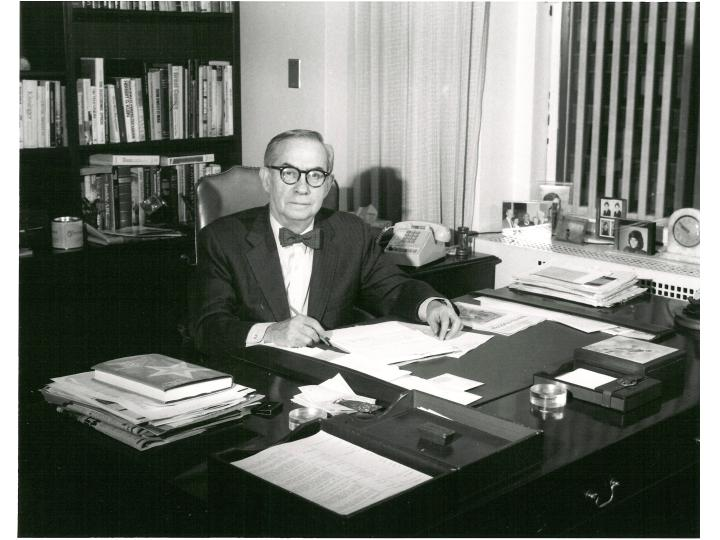
- Died: October 8, 1992
- Education: Georgetown University
- Known for: Founding Television/Radio Age

Sol J. Paul was an American broadcaster, writer, ad sales leader, media policy pundit, and magazine publisher. He was the founding publisher of Television/Radio Age and Cable Age which chronicled the evolution of television from the 1950s to the 1990s and an innovator in the field of advertising. Paul was an advisor on media policy to five United States presidential administrations. He was a former journalist for The Washington Post and Gannett and wrote radio scripts for CBS during his early career. Paul's publishing company, Television Editorial Corporation, owned and published a range of texts and periodicals related to broadcast media during the height of the Cold War including the World Radio TV Handbook

== Early life and education ==
In 1939, Paul attended Georgetown University School of Foreign Service where he received a bachelor's degree. While in college he worked as an administrative assistant to Congressman James P.B. Duffy.

== Career ==
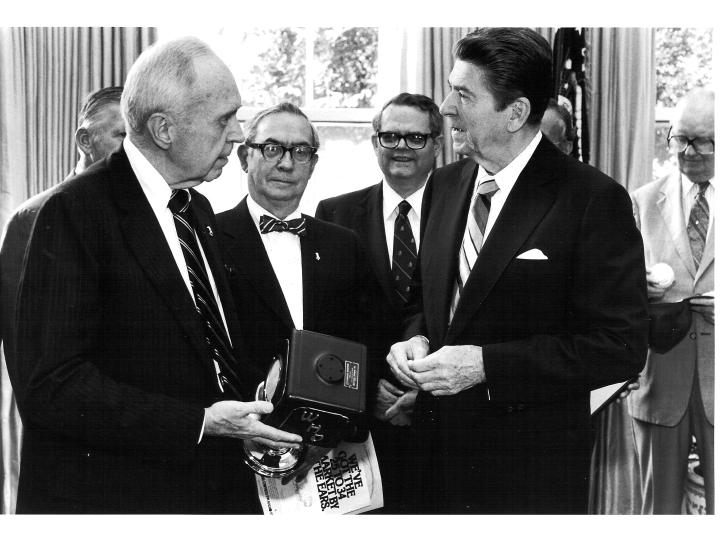
Sol J. Paul meeting with Ronald Reagan at the White House

=== Early career ===
In 1939, after his graduation from Georgetown University, Paul began his career as a reporter for The Washington Post. He worked for the Post until 1940 when he left to become the Washington correspondent for Gannett. Paul held this position until 1941 when he joined Broadcasting & Cable, known at the time as Broadcasting Magazine, in New York as a feature writer.

=== Television/Radio Age magazine ===
In 1953, Paul left Broadcasting Magazine to start the publication Television Age (later renamed Television/Radio Age) with the support of David Sarnoff and John Taylor of RCA. Television Age, which ran from 1953 to 1989, was one of the first television industry trade magazines that raised national awareness of the emerging broadcast media. Television Age started as a monthly publication until 1956 when it went to the biweekly format.

During this time he also founded the publications Cable Age, Television Radio Age International, Twelve City Guide, and Broadcast Educational Texts under the parent company Television Editorial Corporation. During the height of the Cold War, Paul published the World Radio TV Handbook to promote short wave radio operation, with notable distribution to former Soviet Union countries from a PO box in Copenhagen, Denmark.

=== Politics ===
Television/Radio Age covered significant changes to broadcast regulation and Paul was viewed as a leader in the field. "He [S.J Paul] would dictate the topics and I’d come up with content, not because he wasn’t a good writer, but simply because he was constantly on the phone dispensing advice, especially to radio and TV station managers and owners."- Dom Serafini, VideoAge, 2008.

Paul was one of the first journalists to enter China with a delegation of broadcast media professionals after the Nixon visit in 1972.

As a publisher of the second most influential magazine in the world for media, after Broadcasting, Paul sat on an FCC Communications advisory council for five presidential administrations (Reagan, Ford, Carter, Nixon, and Johnson.) Paul also presented on media related matters to the Congressional subcommittee on Broadcasting and Media (now called the Subcommittee on Communications, Media, and Broadband). According to subcommittee records:

"There was a remarkable statement by Mr. S.J. Paul, editor of Television-Radio Magazine in a recent issue of the magazine. Mr. Paul said, and I quote: What is most encouraging about the broadcast media is that both radio and television have not anywhere reached their potential. It is no secret that many stations have, with consistently attractive profits, become complacent and somewhat lethargic in their operation."

=== End of Television/Radio Age ===
In late 1989, Television/Radio Age filed for bankruptcy under the speculation that Paul refused an offer for $14 million. His refusal created unrest among the partners and information about a fire sale was leaked to the magazine Electronic Media shortly before the magazine folded. Following the end of his publication Paul retired to his home in Princeton, NJ.

=== World Radio TV Handbook ===
Self-described as "the world's most accurate and comprehensive directory of global broadcasting", the World Radio TV Handbook, commonly known as "WRTH", was founded by Olaf Lund Johasen in 1947 and published by Sol J. Paul for a period during the 60s.

=== Radio shows ===
In addition to Paul's work at Broadcasting Magazine, he was a freelance radio script writer for CBS. Between 1946 and 1947 he was responsible for bringing the popular war time comedic short stories of McGarry and His Mouse to life as a radio show as a summer replacement series that starred Wendell Corey and Peggy Conklin.

Paul is also known for the show This is the Underground that also ran on CBS.

=== Advertising ===
Paul was described by his peers like Lawerence H. Rogers II as a “brilliant” ad man who was a showman adept at weaving the value story. He also viewed the commercial as an art form that was the backbone of television programming,

"When you consider all the elements that are condensed in a television commercial, you realize that this is one of the highly specialized creative arts of the business. In a sense, the entire business is built and thrives on the commercial, that minuscule powerhouse of atomic dimensions. Within the framework of a good commercial are lodged effectiveness, impact, good taste and reaction ."- S.J. Paul, Television Age, May 1959

Sol J. Paul is considered by many in the industry as a pioneer of the television ad spot.

Paul, along with Lawerence H Rogers, II, devised the concept of the “hyphenated market” in advertising by merging broadcast regions after Rogers discovered his West Virginia station's more powerful transmitter overpowered the signal of rival stations.

"It was really Sol Paul who originally coined the phrase 'Charleston-Huntington,' deliberately placing the emphasis on the large and better known of the two by juxtaposition."- Lawerence H. Rogers, II

Paul philosophically supported the TV commercial makers and the value of the “ad spot” believing that commercial makers are the stars of radio-television.

"The commercials makers are themselves the stars of the radio-television structure. For in the short time frame of 20, 30, or 60 seconds a mood is created- a message is transmitted- and a sales point is made. This finished product is the result of many talents. In some cases, as it has often been remarked, the commercials are better than the programs."

Paul was supportive of the creation of the Television Advertising Bureau (now known as the Television Bureau of Advertising) as a way to have a unified promotional voice speaking out on behalf of television advertisers

=== UHF television broadcasting ===
Paul was a key player in the promotion of color television and the introduction of the UHF spectrum for television broadcasting. His magazine played a large role in explaining these new technological developments and how to use television ads to advertising agencies.

The trade paper campaign that Paul designed for Rogers helped keep his West Virginia station on top when competition increased following the end of the FCC freeze on UHF licenses.

Paul was against the principle of government-imposed licensing fees on radio and television operators at the end of the FCC freeze.

"Broadcasters have learned the hard way that freedom is a fragile commodity. They are now witnessing another assault on a hitherto free area, The license fee which the government is about to slap on TV and radio operators is an unappetizing piece of business. What can the Administration hope to gain in revenue by attaching a fee to the station license? Since the fee itself is deductible, the new amount of income to the government couldn’t buy a fleet of mail trucks. What’s more important is the establishment of the principle of the fee. This places another weapon in the hands of the bureaucracy to wield as it may against the broadcaster."- Sol. J Paul- Television Age March 1954

== Personal life ==
Paul is the brother of the former Major League Baseball executive, Gabe Paul. He was a charter member and president of the Broadcast Pioneers Association and a member of the St. John's College communications advisory board.

Paul died October 8, 1992, following complications from a stroke. He was survived by his wife Margaret, two daughters and a son.
