= Bucchino =

Bucchino is a surname. Notable people with the surname include:

- Gino Bucchino (born 1948), Italian politician
- John Bucchino (born 1952), American songwriter, accompanist, cabaret performer, and teacher
