= VideoAge International =

American trade magazine

- Cover of the September 2023 issue
- Type: Monthly magazine, daily only at television trade events
- Format: Tabloid
- Owner: TV Trade Media Inc.
- Publisher: Monica Gorghetto
- Editor: Dom Serafini
- Staff writers: 15
- Founded: 1981
- Headquarters: Andy Warhol House, PW 216 E75 NYC
- Circulation: 12,000 (4,000 bonus at trade markets)
- ISSN: 0278-5013
- Website: videoageinternational.com

VideoAge International is a TV trade magazine based in New York City, with offices in Los Angeles, California and Milan, Italy.

Known simply as VideoAge, it is published by TV Trade Media, Inc. Its subtitle is "The Business Journal of Film, Broadcasting, Broadband, Production, Distribution," which was modified in 2000 from its 1981 version, "The Business Journal of Television." It comes out seven times per year. It also publishes dailies during major international TV trade shows. It is now considered the only TV trade publication 100% devoted to the business of buying and selling content.

== History ==
VideoAge was launched in 1981 by Dom Serafini, when the international television industry was still in its infancy. The magazine made its first appearance at VIDCOM, a television trade market in Cannes that was a precursor of MIPCOM. Its name was chosen because the time of its launch, 1981, was the age of video. Indeed, "video age" soon became The New York Times' favorite expression to describe the foreseen 500-channel universe (of the "push" type).

When VideoAge was introduced, the television sector already had five publications: Variety, The Hollywood Reporter, Broadcasting, Television/Radio Age and, in the U.K., TV World. Both TV/Radio Age and TV World went out of business in the late 80s.

Serafini, a former international editor of TV/Radio Age, created VideoAge with a unique formula: the key companies in the TV business fronted the money in exchange for ad pages. Among the first 20 supporting companies were MGM, MIFED (Mercato internazionale del film e del documentario), Rusconi Editori, CBN (Pat Robertson), Canale 5 (Silvio Berlusconi), ABC TV stations, Eastman Kodak and Brazil’s Globo TV.

In early 1983 VideoAge introduced, at NATPE in Las Vegas, the industry’s first trade show daily (subsequently branded as The TV Executive) by using Polaroid pictures for the photo-page. This was an era without one-hour photo developing and without easily available fax machines and, in lieu of yet unfamiliar cell phones, bulky walkie-talkies and pagers were used. The yellow VideoAge T-shirts were then worn as a way to identify reporters on the trade floor.

Among the first companies to support VideoAge's dailies were Enter-Tel, France’s TF1 and Telepictures. Today, the concept of dailies has been rendered more valuable by online services, which, in the hectic market schedules, are limited to e-mail checking, while trade news is more convenient in the printed format. The magazine initially served an audience that tended to know more than the journalists did. They reported on events that most readers were aware of beforehand, and they could not cover them in depth. Additionally, they had to walk a fine line and report on people and companies which were also their advertisers.

The magazine began publishing daily during selected television trade markets in 1984. It opened with an office in New York, and soon expanded to Los Angeles, San Francisco, and Milan. From 1987 to 1989 the editorial offices were moved to London (on 41 Gloucester Place), afterwards returning to New York City on 216 E. 75 St., the current address since it moved from the original venue on 211 E. 51 St., in 1988. There is also a branch office in Osaka, Japan.

VideoAge eventually defined its topics of study along the lines of regulations, sociology, psychographics, finances, production, distribution, ratings, broadcasting, cablecasting, satellite, IPTV, piracy, as well as introductions to new technology, and attempts to make complex new technological topics digestible to non-geeks and rich technophobes. The vast majority of its current business model deals with competing with the television trade's ten other publications that cover all aspects of television, especially international TV. It also competes with many more publications which cover specialized TV fields such as mobile video, Internet-TV, cable and/or satellite TV.

VideoAge was one of the first trades to enter online services in 1997, first with its English site, followed by a Spanish-language and Italian-language version. The main website contains archival issues. Archive material can also be found at archive.org.

== Current ==
The magazine's main market is at television trade shows, where it is distributed free of charge. It does have a minute newsstand presence, and can be found in the lobby of a variety of Los Angeles hotels, especially around the time of the LA screenings. Revenue comes entirely under the form of profit from advertisers. The magazine occasionally prints with a Spanish-language section. A presence in South America is budding, and the magazine has strong ties with a Brazilian trade show in São Paulo. The magazine also has a web presence, releasing occasional online press statements and videos documenting the magazine's presence at trade shows.

== Format ==
VideoAge utilizes a tabloid format and prints in full color. Until 1995, it published in an A4 format. Advertisements are for the most part full-page, although the front cover ad is smaller. Articles both report business news and examine the television industry; the magazine is thus somewhat popular in universities where it is utilized as a primary reference source and object of study in a variety of classes. The scope of the magazine tends to focus more on those companies that advertise on it. It differs from its competitors, such as Variety, in the sense that it does not dispatch reporters to stories, nor does it engage in conventional reporting practices. Because the magazine only has a real presence in trade shows, its scope tends to focus on those.

== Online services ==
VideoAge maintains three web sites in English, Spanish and Italian, as well as an additional site for dailies. Published articles can be viewed as PDFs (full issue and full page) and a selected few as text. VideoAge publishes a daily online newsletter and a weekly feature, "Water Cooler."
