= 1988 New York state election =

The 1988 New York state election was held on November 8, 1988, to elect representatives to the United States Electoral College, a member of the United States Senate, and members of the United States House of Representatives, the New York State Assembly, and the New York State Senate.

== Results (partial) ==
1988 New York state election results: State Senate, 19th District

General election results
Senate candidate	Party	Popular Vote (PV)	
Martin M. Solomon	Democratic	37,758	73.15
Joseph Cirnigliaro	Republican; Conservative; Right to Life	13,860	26.85
Total valid votes		51,618	100

Source: "THE ELECTIONS; New York State Senate," New York Times, 10 November 1988. The numbers are unofficial figures. The website Our Campaigns lists the final result as: Solomon 39,234 (72.80%), Cirnigliaro 14,658 (27.20%), citing the New York Red Book as its source.
