= Opinion polling for the 2008 Italian general election =

In the years running up to the 2008 Italian general election, various organisations carried out opinion polls to gauge voting intention in Italy. Results of such polls are given in this article. Poll results are reported at the dates when the fieldwork was done, as opposed to the date of publication; if such date is unknown, the date of publication is given instead. Under the Italian par condicio (equal conditions) law, publication of opinion polls is forbidden in the last two weeks of an electoral campaign.

== Party vote ==
=== Graphical summary ===
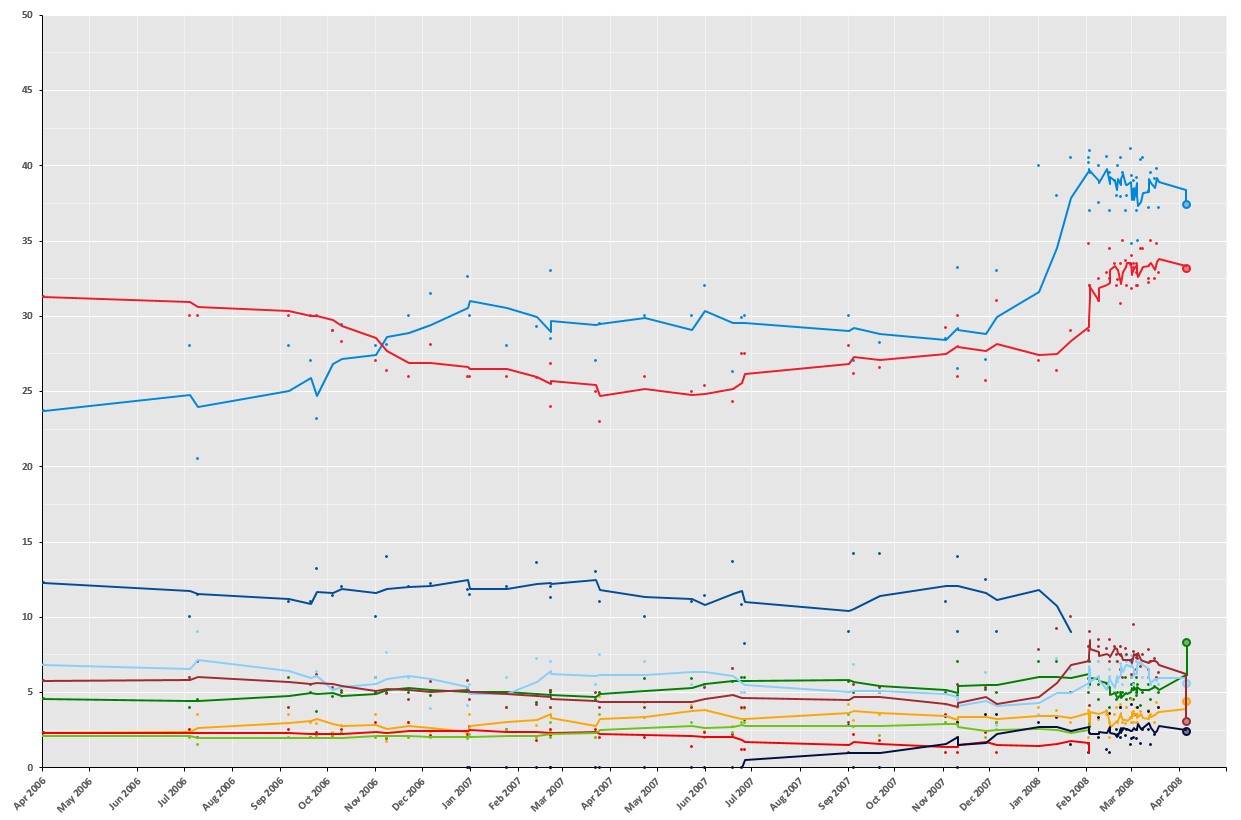
4-point average trend line of poll results from April 2006 to the present day, with each line corresponding to a political party. FI/PdL PD Lega UDC IdV PRC/SA AN FdV PdCI LD

=== 2008 ===
Date	Polling firm	PD	PdL	UDC	SA	LN	IdV	LD	Others	Lead
13–14 April	Election results	33.2	37.4	5.6	3.1	8.3	4.4	2.4	5.6	4.2
26–27 Mar	Crespi	32.9	37.2	5.5	6.3	5.0	4.0	4.0	5.1	4.3
25–26 Mar	Demos&Pi	34.8	39.8	5.8	6.0	5.9	4.3	—	3.4	5.0
21–25 Mar	Lorien	32.5	39.1	7.1	7.2	5.4	3.0	2.2	3.5	6.6
21–22 Mar	ISPO	35.0	39.5	5.5	7.0	4.5	3.5	1.5	3.5	4.5
17–21 Mar	Quaeris	32.5	37.2	6.0	6.5	6.0	3.8	3.7	4.3	4.7
17–21 Mar	Euromedia	32.2	38.3	5.1	7.8	5.5	3.8	2.5	4.8	6.1
13–17 Mar	Demoskopea	34.5	40.5	6.0	7.5	5.0	2.5	2.5	1.5	6.0
15–16 Mar	Digis	34.5	40.4	6.9	6.7	4.1	3.7	1.6	2.1	5.9
14 Mar	ClandestinoWeb	32.0	35.0	7.4	7.2	5.5	3.0	4.0	3.9	3.0
11–13 Mar	Lorien	32.9	39.2	7.3	7.3	4.8	3.0	1.9	3.6	6.3
10–13 Mar	Demopolis	33.5	38.0	6.5	7.5	5.0	3.5	2.5	4.5	4.5
5–13 Mar	Quaeris	32.0	37.0	7.0	6.5	6.0	4.0	3.5	4.0	5.0
11 Mar	ISPO	33.5	39.0	5.5	9.5	4.5	3.0	3.5	2.5	5.5
7–11 Mar	Dinamiche	33.2	37.9	6.1	7.7	5.6	3.7	2.0	3.9	4.7
10 Mar	Crespi	31.8	34.8	7.4	7.0	6.0	3.0	4.2	6.0	3.0
5–10 Mar	Demos&Pi	34.0	39.3	6.0	6.2	5.5	4.5	1.9	2.7	5.3
8–9 Mar	Digis	33.4	41.1	7.0	7.1	4.6	3.3	1.5	2.0	7.7
6–7 Mar	IPR	32.0	38.0	7.0	7.5	4.5	4.0	2.5	3.5	6.0
3–6 Mar	Lorien	33.7	37.0	7.4	7.9	6.0	2.9	2.1	3.2	3.3
20 Feb–4 Mar	ISPO	35.0	39.5	5.5	6.0	5.0	3.0	2.5	3.5	4.5
3 Mar	Crespi	30.8	37.9	6.9	6.5	5.0	4.2	4.0	4.3	6.9
28 Feb–3 Mar	Demoskopea	33.5	40.5	7.5	8.0	4.0	2.5	2.0	2.0	7.0
29 Feb–1 Mar	Euromedia	32.4	40.0	5.7	7.0	5.0	3.0	2.2	4.5	7.6
28–29 Feb	IPR	32.0	38.0	7.0	7.5	4.5	4.0	2.5	4.2	6.0
25–28 Feb	Demopolis	33.5	39.0	5.0	8.0	5.0	3.5	—	6.0	5.5
25 Feb	Crespi	32.5	37.0	6.5	7.0	5.3	3.0	3.6	5.1	4.5
21–25 Feb	Demoskopea	34.5	39.5	6.0	8.5	4.0	2.0	1.0	3.5	5.0
22–23 Feb	Euromedia	32.9	40.6	3.8	7.9	5.6	3.5	1.2	4.3	7.7
18 Feb	Crespi	31.0	37.5	7.0	8.0	5.5	3.2	3.3	4.5	6.5
14–18 Feb	Demoskopea	32.5	40.0	7.0	8.5	4.5	2.0	2.0	3.5	7.5
11–12 Feb	Crespi	32.0	37.0	6.5	9.0	6.0	2.5	3.5	3.5	5.0
10–12 Feb	Ferrari Nasi	32.0	41.0	2.9	4.1	7.0	6.5	2.7	3.8	9.0
11 Feb	Ipsos	34.8	40.2	5.3	7.1	5.9	3.8	1.6	1.3	5.4
4–11 Feb	Piepoli	29.0	40.5	8.0	8.0	5.0	2.0	1.0	2.0	11.5
25–31 Jan	Demopolis	29.0	40.5	6.5	10.0	5.0	3.0	1.5	4.5	11.5
21–22 Jan	Ekma	26.4	38.0	7.2	9.2	7.0	3.8	3.3	6.3	11.6
9–10 Jan	Ekma	27.0	40.0	3.5	7.8	7.0	4.0	3.0	5.7	13.0

=== 2007 ===
Date	Polling firm	Ulivo/ PD	FI	AN	UDC	PRC	LN	PdCI	IdV	FdV	LD	Others	Lead
13–14 Dec	Ekma	31.0	33.0	9.0	2.8	3.0	5.0	1.0	2.5	3.0	3.5	6.2	2.0
3–7 Dec	Dinamiche	25.7	27.1	12.5	6.3	5.3	5.2	2.3	3.4	2.0	3.5	7.9	1.4
19 Nov	Ekma	30.0	33.2	9.0	2.8	3.0	4.8	1.0	3.0	3.0	3.0	8.2	3.2
9–11 Nov	Ekma	29.2	28.5	11.0	4.2	3.5	5.0	1.0	3.0	3.0	3.4	8.2	0.7
19 Nov	Ekma	26.0	26.5	14.0	4.5	5.5	7.0	2.0	4.0	2.0	—	8.5	0.5
27–30 Sep	ISPO	26.6	28.2	14.2	5.0	5.3	5.0	1.8	3.5	2.1	—	6.3	1.6
11–13 Sep	Eurisko	26.2	27.0	14.2	6.8	5.5	5.0	2.2	3.1	2.7	—	8.1	0.8
7–10 Sep	Ekma	28.0	30.0	9.0	3.5	3.0	5.7	1.0	4.2	3.5	2.8	8.3	2.0
2–3 Jul	Ekma	27.5	29.9	10.8	5.0	4.0	6.0	1.2	3.9	3.0	—	8.7	2.4
4–5 Jul	Ekma	27.5	30.0	8.2	5.0	4.0	6.0	1.2	3.9	3.0	3.2	8.0	2.5
25–27 Jun	Eurisko	24.3	26.3	13.7	6.6	6.6	5.7	2.2	2.7	2.3	—	9.6	2.0
8–9 Jun	Euromedia	25.4	32.0	11.4	5.4	5.3	5.5	2.3	2.4	2.0	—	8.3	6.6
1 Jun	Ekma	25.0	30.0	11.0	5.5	4.0	5.9	1.4	4.1	3.0	—	10.1	5.0
2 May	Ekma	26.0	30.0	10.0	7.0	4.0	5.9	2.0	4.3	3.3	—	7.5	4.0
2–3 Apr	Ekma	23.0	29.5	11.0	7.5	4.0	5.0	2.0	4.7	3.5	—	8.8	6.5
29–31 Mar	IPR	25.0	27.0	13.0	5.5	5.0	4.5	2.5	2.0	2.0	—	12.0	2.0
1–2 Mar	Ekma	24.0	28.5	12.0	7.0	4.0	5.0	2.5	4.0	3.0	—	9.0	4.5
8 Jan–2 Mar	Euromedia	26.8	33.0	11.3	4.8	5.1	5.1	2.1	2.4	2.0	—	7.4	6.2
21 Feb	Unicab	25.9	29.3	13.6	7.2	4.2	4.3	1.8	2.8	2.0	—	8.9	3.4
1–2 Feb	Ekma	26.0	28.0	12.0	6.0	4.0	5.0	2.5	4.0	2.5	—	10.0	2.0
8–9 Jan	Ekma	26.0	30.0	11.5	5.5	4.5	5.0	2.7	3.5	2.2	—	8.1	4.0
8 Jan	Euromedia	26.0	32.6	11.8	4.1	5.8	5.3	2.2	2.3	1.9	—	8.0	6.6

=== 2006 ===
Date	Polling firm	Ulivo	FI	AN	UDC	PRC	LN	PdCI	IdV	FdV	Others	Lead
15 Dec	Euromedia	28.1	31.5	12.2	3.9	5.7	4.8	2.1	2.4	2.0	7.4	3.4
30 Nov–1 Dec	Ekma	26.0	30.0	12.0	6.0	4.5	5.0	3.0	3.0	2.0	8.5	4.0
17 Nov	Unicab	26.4	28.1	14.0	7.6	4.9	5.0	1.9	1.7	2.0	8.4	1.7
9–10 Nov	Ekma	27.0	28.0	10.0	6.0	5.0	6.0	3.0	3.5	2.0	8.0	1.0
19 Oct	Euromedia	28.3	29.4	12.0	4.7	5.0	5.1	2.5	2.8	2.3	7.9	1.1
13 Oct	Euromedia	29.0	29.0	11.4	5.3	5.3	4.7	2.1	2.3	2.1	9.1	0.0
26 Sep–3 Oct	Eurisko	30.0	23.2	13.2	6.4	6.2	3.7	2.3	2.9	2.1	8.6	6.8
28–29 Sep	Eurisko	30.0	27.0	11.0	5.0	5.0	5.5	2.0	3.0	2.0	9.5	3.0
12 Jul–15 Sep	Ekma	30.0	28.0	11.0	4.0	4.0	6.0	2.5	3.5	2.0	9.0	2.0
17–18 Jul	IPR	30.0	20.5	11.5	9.0	7.0	4.5	2.0	3.5	1.5	10.5	9.5
12–13 Jul	Ekma	30.0	28.0	10.0	6.0	6.0	4.0	2.5	2.5	2.0	9.0	2.0
9–10 April	Election results	31.3	23.7	12.3	6.8	5.8	4.6	2.3	2.3	2.1	8.8	7.6
