= Television/Radio Age =

US magazine

- Editor: Alfred J. Jaffe
- Categories: Trade magazine
- Frequency: Biweekly
- Publisher: Sol J. Paul
- Founder: Sol J. Paul
- First issue: July 15, 1953
- Final issue Number: November 27, 1989; Volume XXXVIII, No. 9
- Company: Television Editorial Corporation
- Country: United States
- Based in: New York City
- Language: English
- ISSN: 0040-277X

Television/Radio Age magazine was a US television industry trade magazine published by Television Editorial Corporation from 1953 to 1989. Originally titled Television Age, the magazine began as a monthly until 1956 and biweekly thereafter. Television/Radio Age was known for its dry but detailed coverage of the broadcasting industry and pioneering efforts to connect Madison Avenue (the advertisers) with program makers. It was published alongside sister publications Television/Radio Age International, Cable Age and the Twelve City Guide - all of which folded in 1989 following financial difficulties.

== History ==
Television/Radio Age was founded in New York City by Sol J "SJ" Paul with the support of David Sarnoff and John Taylor of RCA, the latter citing concerns with the domination of the magazine Broadcasting (now known as Broadcasting & Cable). S.J. Paul was working for Broadcasting magazine as Advertising Manager when he departed to start Television Age. Larry Taishoff, the founder and publisher of Broadcasting spurned Paul for leaving and starting a competitive magazine - which began a bitter rivalry that lasted until the demise of Television/Radio Age. However, where Broadcasting served as a news magazine for the industry, Television/Radio Age served as a business journal with a focus on the "nuts and bolts" of TV. The publisher, SJ Paul, also philosophically supported the TV commercial makers and the value of the "ad spot." The parent company, Television Editorial Corporation, had nineteen founding shareholders who were eventually bought out one by one.

The magazine's major source of revenue was print advertising from TV stations who wanted to reach advertisers and hardware manufacturers who wanted to sell wares to TV stations. It covered TV advertising, spot ad sales, national ad sales, production, TV ratings, legislature, content syndication, trade shows, international television and cable TV. Television/Radio Age played a role in explaining TV advertising to Advertising Agencies and promoted new industry capabilities such as color television and the introduction of UHF spectrum for TV broadcasting. It competed with Variety in New York, Broadcasting in Washington D.C., Advertising Age in Chicago, and The Hollywood Reporter in Los Angeles.

== Related publications ==
In 1970 the magazine developed an international TV trade publication as inserts within Television Age and in 1976 launched Television/Radio Age International. Related publications also included Cable Age, Twelve City Guide, the World Radio TV Handbook (for a brief period prior to 1965) and Investment Business Forecast, a weekly financial newsletter.

== Bankruptcy ==
Television/Radio Age filed for Bankruptcy in late 1989. Some speculated that Paul refused an offer for $14m which created unrest among the partners. In 1989 information was leaked to the magazine Electronic Media about a fire sale and Television/Radio Age folded shortly thereafter. Founder and publisher S.J. Paul retired to his home in Princeton, NJ and died in 1992.
