= Forza Italia =

Forza Italia may refer to:

- Forza Italia (1994), a defunct Italian political party
  - Forza Italia (2013), a revival of the 1994 party
- Forza Italia! (film), a 1977 Italian documentary film
