= 2008 Italian Senate election, North and Central American division =

The 2008 Italian general election was the second in which Italian and dual citizens living outside the country could vote by postal ballot in international electoral districts. Twelve members of the Italian Chamber of Deputies and six members of the Italian Senate were elected in this way.

Italian and dual citizens in North America and Central America (including the Caribbean) elected one member of the Italian Senate. The winning candidate was Basilio Giordano from Silvio Berlusconi's party, known as the People of Freedom.

== The process ==
All electors could vote for a political list and also cast a first preference vote for a specific candidate. The party with the highest number of list votes won the Senate seat, and the winning party's candidate with the highest number of first preference votes was declared elected.

== The parties ==
Four electoral lists contested the North and Central American Senate division. The same lists also fielded candidates for the Chamber of Deputies and North and Central America.

The governing centre-left Democratic Party ran a united slate, as did Berlusconi's right-wing opposition list. The moderately conservative Union of the Centre (UDC), formerly aligned with Berlusconi, ran a separate list, as did a small coalition of right-wing and far-right parties called The Right–Tricolour Flame.

All of the party lists fielded two candidates.

== The candidates ==
=== People of Freedom ===
- Basilio Giordano is a publisher and former municipal politician in Montreal, Quebec, Canada.
- Augusto Sorriso is a former mayor of Licata, Sicily, who subsequently became an entrepreneur based in New Jersey. He had previously sought election to the Italian Senate in 2006.

=== Democratic Party ===
- Renato Turano is an entrepreneur in Chicago. He served in the Italian Senate from 2006 to 2008.
- Marina Piazzi was born in Bologna on April 10, 1954, and moved to Mexico in 1976. She has taught Italian as a second language at the Istituto Italiano di Cultura in Mexico City and worked in the Italian department at the National Autonomous University of Mexico. Piazzi has been active for many years with the General Council for Italians Abroad and other Italian community organizations.

=== Union of the Centre ===
- Massimo Seracini (June 7, 1943 – January 16, 2009) was born in Florence and received an economics degree from the University of Florence in 1962. He moved to the United States of America in the 1960s and worked in real estate in California. After his marriage failed, he returned to Florence and opened a bistro. He lived for extended periods in both countries during the last decades of his life and became a fixture of the Italian community in San Diego. Seracini had previously campaigned for an overseas seat in the Italian Chamber of Deputies in the 2006 general election as a candidate of the Union of Christian and Centre Democrats. A newspaper report from 2006 described him as "vague on details about his platform" but eager to serve Italians living in the diaspora. He died in San Diego in 2009, after a two-year battle with cancer.
- Vittorio Coco is a broadcaster in Toronto, Ontario, Canada. He had previously sought election to the Italian Senate in 2006.

=== The Right–Tricolour Flame ===
- Giuseppe (Joseph) P. Cirnigliaro was born on November 10, 1954, in Militello in Val di Catania, Sicily. He ran for the New York State Senate's 19th district in 1988 as a Republican. During the 2008 campaign, he argued that Italy should adopt a strong presidential model of government akin to that of the United States of America.
- Franco Misuraca was born on June 10, 1943, in Aprigliano, Calabria, and later moved to Toronto, Ontario, Canada. He is a longtime supporter of the right-wing Italian Social Movement. In 2008, he centered his campaign around the slogan, "God, country, and family."

== The results ==
Berlusconi's electoral coalition won a narrow plurality, defeating the Democratic Party by only 793 votes. Basilio Giordano received the most votes of the candidates on Berlusconi's list and was declared elected.

Democratic Party incumbent Renato Turano actually received more first preference votes than Giordano, but, as his party list was defeated, he was not returned to office.

2008 Italian general election results: Senate, North and Central America region

Party	Votes	%	Senators
People of Freedom	38,896	44.96	1
Democratic Party	38,103	44.04	
Union of the Centre	7,330	8.47	
The Right–Tricolour Flame	2,193	2.53	
Total valid votes	86,522	100.00	

People of Freedom candidate preference votes
Basilio Giordano (elected)	13,083
Augusto Sorriso	8,699

Democratic Party candidate preference votes
Renato Turano (incumbent)	15,223
Marina Piazzi	7,431

Union of the Centre candidate preference votes
Massimo Seracini	2,194
Vittorio Coco	1,791

The Right–Tricolour Flame candidate preference votes
Giuseppe Cirnigliaro	544
Franco Misuraca	461

Source: ARCHIVIO STORICO DELLE ELEZIONI - Consultazione dati: Senato 13/04/2008, Area ESTERO, Ripartizione AMERICA SETTENTRIONALE E CENTRALE, Ministerio dell'Interno, Government of Italy, accessed 27 July 2011. Voters were not required to give a preference vote for any candidate.

== Detailed results by country ==
More than 90 per cent of the total votes were cast in the United States of America and Canada. The Democratic Party won narrow victory in the United States, Mexico, and Nicaragua, but was defeated everywhere else. The People of Freedom won a narrow victory in Canada; this was a significant shift from the 2006 election, when the centre-left had won by a credible margin.

=== Antigua and Barbuda ===
Party	Votes	%
Democratic Party	0	0.00
People of Freedom	0	0.00
Union of the Centre	0	0.00
The Right–Tricolour Flame	0	0.00
Total valid votes	0	0.00

=== Bahamas ===
Party	Votes	%
Democratic Party	0	0.00
People of Freedom	0	0.00
Union of the Centre	0	0.00
The Right–Tricolour Flame	0	0.00
Total valid votes	0	0.00

=== Barbados ===
Party	Votes	%
Democratic Party	0	0.00
People of Freedom	0	0.00
Union of the Centre	0	0.00
The Right–Tricolour Flame	0	0.00
Total valid votes	0	0.00

=== Belize ===
Party	Votes	%
Democratic Party	0	0.00
People of Freedom	0	0.00
Union of the Centre	0	0.00
The Right–Tricolour Flame	0	0.00
Total valid votes	0	0.00

=== Canada ===
Party	Votes	%
People of Freedom	16,184	45.15
Democratic Party	15,794	44.06
Union of the Centre	3,274	9.13
The Right–Tricolour Flame	595	1.66
Total valid votes	35,847	42.82

=== Costa Rica ===
Party	Votes	%
People of Freedom	385	55.56
Democratic Party	248	35.79
Union of the Centre	34	4.91
The Right–Tricolour Flame	26	3.75
Total valid votes	693	0.83

=== Dominican Republic ===
Party	Votes	%
People of Freedom	723	58.88
Democratic Party	294	23.94
The Right–Tricolour Flame	140	11.40
Union of the Centre	71	5.78
Total valid votes	1,228	1.47

=== El Salvador ===
Party	Votes	%
People of Freedom	244	65.42
Democratic Party	99	26.54
Union of the Centre	22	5.90
The Right–Tricolour Flame	8	2.14
Total valid votes	373	0.45

=== Grenada ===
Party	Votes	%
Democratic Party	0	0.00
People of Freedom	0	0.00
Union of the Centre	0	0.00
The Right–Tricolour Flame	0	0.00
Total valid votes	0	0.00

=== Guatemala ===
Party	Votes	%
People of Freedom	584	64.82
Democratic Party	186	20.64
The Right–Tricolour Flame	73	8.10
Union of the Centre	58	6.44
Total valid votes	901	1.08

=== Haiti ===
Party	Votes	%
Democratic Party	0	0.00
People of Freedom	0	0.00
Union of the Centre	0	0.00
The Right–Tricolour Flame	0	0.00
Total valid votes	0	0.00

=== Honduras ===
Party	Votes	%
People of Freedom	44	45.36
Democratic Party	37	38.14
Union of the Centre	14	14.43
The Right–Tricolour Flame	2	2.06
Total valid votes	97	0.12

=== Mexico ===
Party	Votes	%
Democratic Party	667	47.41
People of Freedom	599	42.57
Union of the Centre	107	7.60
The Right–Tricolour Flame	34	2.42
Total valid votes	1,407	1.68

=== Nicaragua ===
Party	Votes	%
Democratic Party	64	47.76
People of Freedom	50	37.31
Union of the Centre	10	7.46
The Right–Tricolour Flame	10	7.46
Total valid votes	134	0.16

=== Panama ===
Party	Votes	%
People of Freedom	129	50.99
Democratic Party	91	35.97
Union of the Centre	25	9.88
The Right–Tricolour Flame	8	3.16
Total valid votes	253	0.30

=== United States of America ===
Party	Votes	%
Democratic Party	19,254	45.00
People of Freedom	18,832	44.01
Union of the Centre	3,472	8.11
The Right–Tricolour Flame	1,230	2.87
Total valid votes	42,788	51.11

Note: The country-by-country totals provided by the Italian Ministry of the Interior do not entirely correspond with the final totals provided by the same source. Adding up the country-by-country totals yields the following results: People of Freedom 37,774; Democratic Party 36,734; Union of the Centre 7,087; The Right–Tricolour Flame 2,126. These results are the same as the provisional totals provided by La Repubblica with 120 out of 123 polling districts reporting. It is therefore assumed that the country-by-country totals represent the provisional and not the final totals.
