= 2008 Italian general election =

- 13–14 April 2008

All 630 seats in the Chamber of Deputies 316 seats needed for a majority All 315 elective seats in the Senate 162 seats needed for a majority (Note: taking into account the Senators for life, who accounted for 7 seats at the time the election took place)
- Opinion polls
- Registered: 47,041,814 (C) · 42,358,775 (S)
- Turnout: 37,874,569 (C) · 80.5% (▼3.1 pp); 34,058,406 (S) · 80.4% (▼3.1 pp)
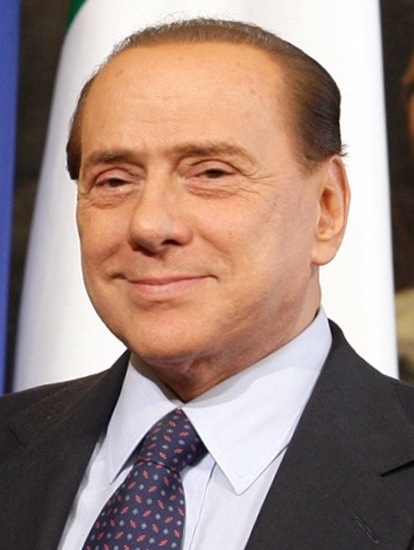

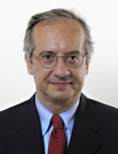

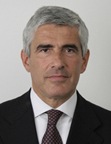
	First party	Second party	Third party
Leader	Silvio Berlusconi	Walter Veltroni	Pier Ferdinando Casini
Party	People of Freedom	Democratic Party	UDC
Alliance	Centre-right	Centre-left	—
Leader since	26 January 1994	14 October 2007	18 January 1994
Leader's seat	Molise (C)	Lazio 1 (C)	Liguria (C)
Seats won	344 (C) / 174 (S)	246 (C) / 134 (S)	36 (C) / 3 (S)
Seat change	▲102 (C) / ▲29 (S)	▲3 (C) / ▲21 (S)	▼3 (C) / ▼18 (S)
Popular vote	17,403,145 (C); 15,508,899 (S)	14,099,747 (C); 12,457,182 (S)	2,050,309 (C); 1,866,356 (S)
Percentage	46.8% (C); 47.3% (S)	37.5% (C); 38.0% (S)	5.6% (C); 5.7% (S)
Swing	▼2.9 pp (C) ▼2.9 pp (S)	▼12.3 pp (C) ▼11.0 pp (S)	▼1.1 pp (C) ▼1.0 pp (S)
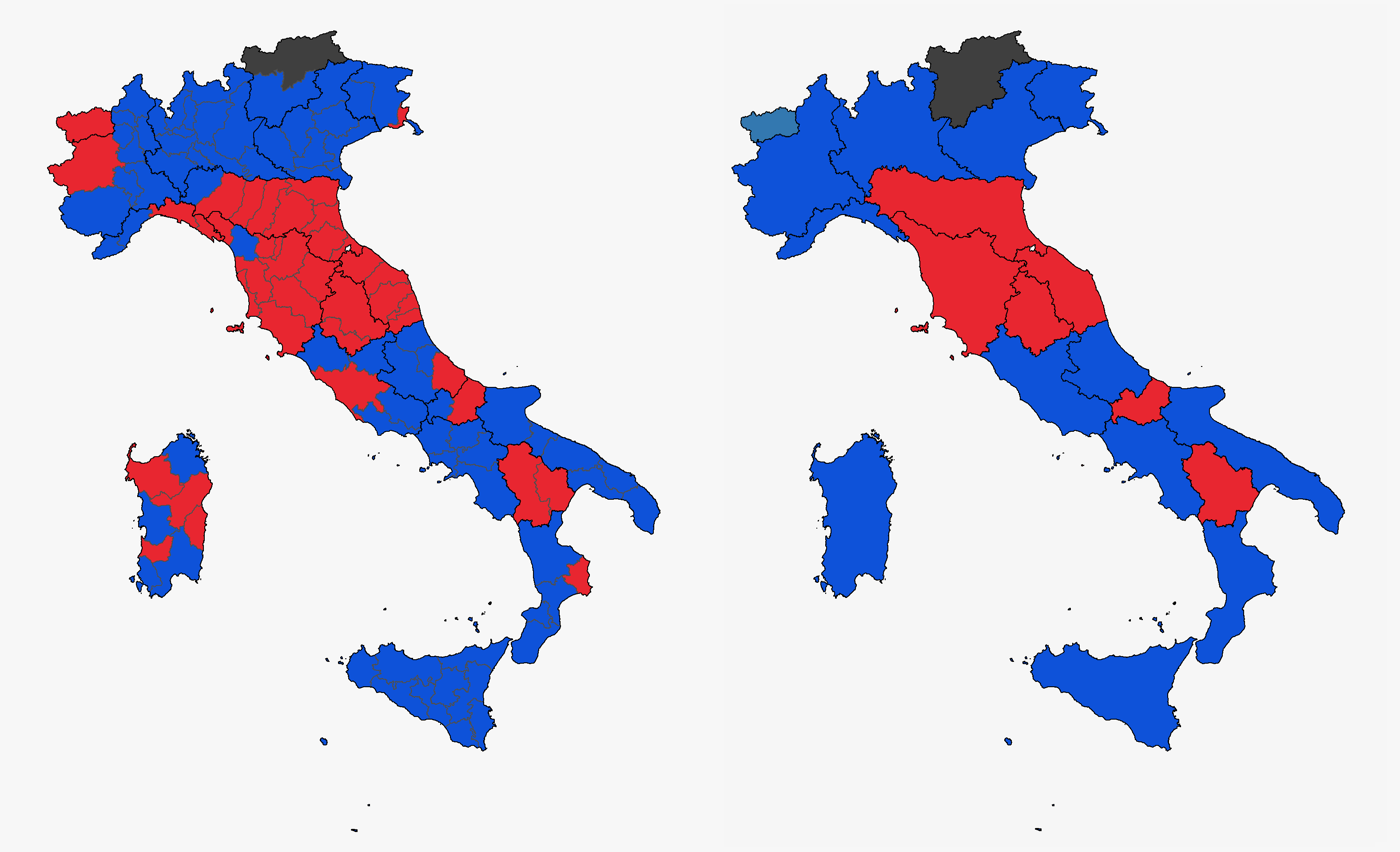
- Election results maps for the Chamber of Deputies (on the left) and for the Senate (on the right). On the left, the color identifies the coalition which received the most votes in each province. On the right, the color identifies the coalition which won the most seats in respect to each Region. Blue denotes the Centre-right coalition, Red the Centre-left coalition, and Gray regional parties.
Prime Minister before election
Romano Prodi
Democratic Party
Prime Minister after the election
Silvio Berlusconi
People of Freedom

A snap election was held in Italy on 13–14 April 2008. The election came after President Giorgio Napolitano dissolved the Italian Parliament on 6 February 2008, following the defeat of the government of Prime Minister Romano Prodi in a January 2008 Senate vote of confidence and the unsuccessful tentative appointment of Franco Marini with the aim to change the current electoral law. Under Italian law, elections must be held within 70 days of the dissolution. The voting determined the leader of Italy's 62nd government since the end of World War II. The coalition led by ex-Prime Minister Silvio Berlusconi from The People of Freedom party defeated that of former Mayor of Rome, Walter Veltroni of the Democratic Party.

== Background ==
On 24 January 2008 Prime Minister of Italy Romano Prodi lost a vote of confidence in the Senate by a vote of 161 to 156 votes, causing the downfall of his government. Prodi's resignation led President Giorgio Napolitano to request the president of the Senate, Franco Marini, to assess the possibility to form a caretaker government. The other possibility would have been to call for early elections immediately.

The decision of former Minister of Justice Mastella arrived a few days after the confirmation of the Constitutional Court which confirmed the referendum to modify the electoral system. As stated many times by Minister Mastella, if the referendum would have been confirmed this would have led directly to the fall of the government and it happened.
The fall of the government would disrupt a pending election-law referendum that if passed would make it harder for small parties like Mastella's to gain seats in parliament.

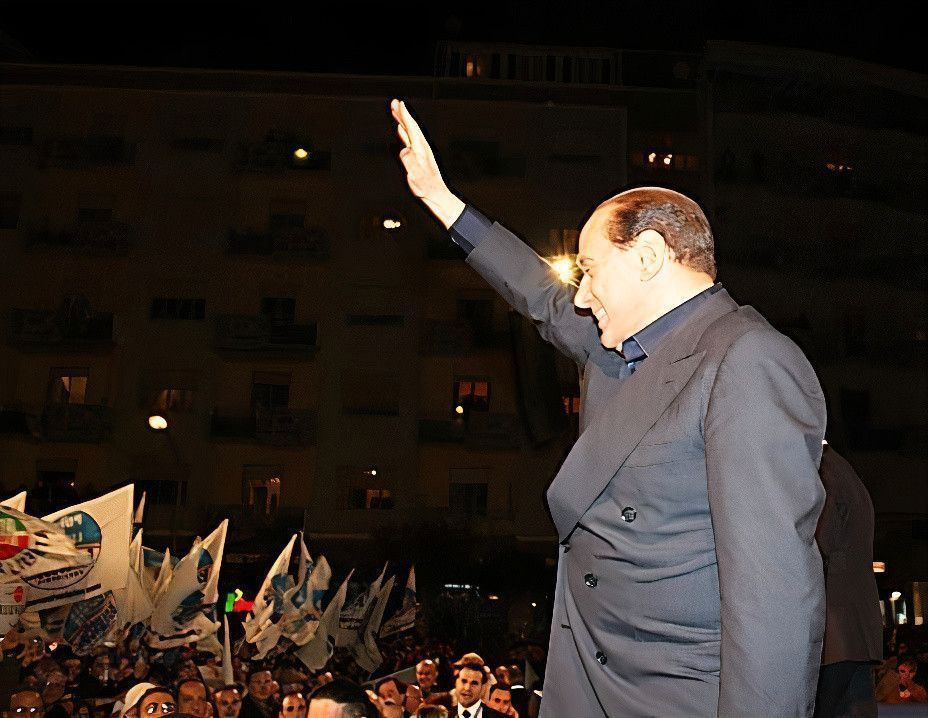
Silvio Berlusconi during a People of Freedom rally in 2008.

UDEUR's defection forced the question of whether Prodi still had the parliamentarian support to govern. Presenting a motion of confidence to parliament, he won relatively easily in the lower house of the Italian Parliament, the Chamber of Deputies, where the coalition's majority was substantial. Yet a win in the upper house – or Senate – seemed unlikely, and President Giorgio Napolitano was said to have warned against going through with the vote.

The vote, held between 3pm and 9pm (CET), was heated and dramatic. During its course the UDEUR party Senator Stefano Cusumano decided to confirm the confidence and to support the prime minister, even against the orders of his party's leader. He was subsequently subjected to the abuse of his colleagues, being called an "hysteric faggot", "traitor", and reportedly spat on by a member of the conservative UDEUR party. At this point Cusumano apparently fainted, and was carried out on a stretcher. Cusumano's defection had no effect, however: Prodi lost the vote with 161 to 156 votes (one member abstained from voting, while three were absent), and promptly handed in his resignation.

On 30 January, Napolitano appointed Franco Marini to try to form a caretaker government with the goal of changing the current electoral system, rather than call a quick election. The state of the electoral system had been under criticism not only within the outgoing government, but also among the opposition and in the general population, because of the impossibility to choose candidates directly and of the risks that a close-call election may not grant a stable majority in the Senate.

On 4 February 2008 Marini acknowledged that he had failed to find the necessary majority for an interim government, and resigned his mandate, after having met with all major political forces and having found opposition to forming an interim government mainly from center-right parties Forza Italia and National Alliance, favoured in a possible next election and strongly in favour of an early vote.,

President Napolitano summoned Bertinotti and Marini, the two speakers of the houses of the Italian parliament, acknowledging the end of the legislature, on 5 February 2008. He dissolved parliament on 6 February 2008.

== Campaign ==
Major competitors in the election were Silvio Berlusconi, as leader of the centre-right opposition coalition, and Walter Veltroni, leader of the Democratic Party. Berlusconi's right coalition was leading by a significant margin in opinion polls. The 71-year-old Berlusconi, who was twice prime minister—from May 1994 to January 1995 and again from May 2001 to May 2006—was not considered too old for the job though he had had heart surgery since leaving office.

Veltroni's campaign has been compared to Barack Obama's presidential run in the United States. The most apparent of the similarities is his slogan, "Si può fare" (literally, "it can be done").

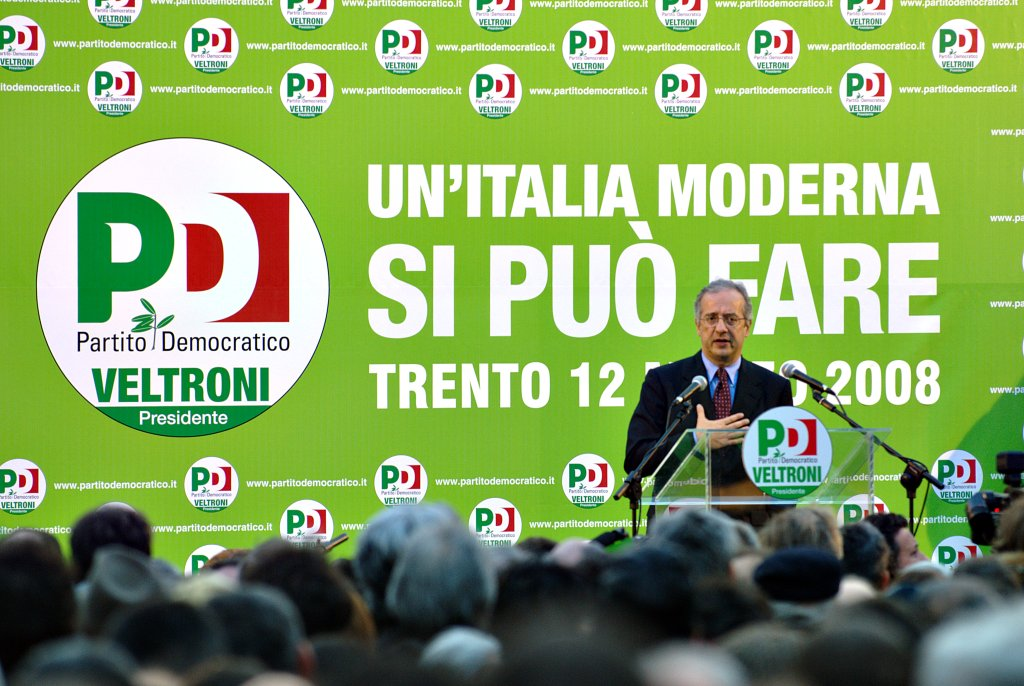
Walter Veltroni in Trento during the electoral campaign.

Following the calling of the election, Veltroni stated his party will not make any alliance in either Chamber, choosing instead to run alone with its own platform, and challenged Berlusconi to do likewise with his Forza Italia party. The main four left-wing parties not part of the PD decided to contest the election together under the banner of The Left – The Rainbow. On 8 February, Berlusconi announced Forza Italia and Gianfranco Fini's National Alliance will run together under the common symbol of The People of Freedom, being regionally allied with the Northern League.

On 13 February, Veltroni announced to have reached an agreement with the Italy of Values, led by Antonio Di Pietro, which agreed for an electoral alliance with the Democratic Party, accepting also to join the Democratic Party parliamentary groups after the election. On 21 February the Italian Radicals announced an agreement with the Democratic Party, accepting to present themselves in list with the latter, under the agreement they will have nine MPs elected in the Parliament, and appointment of Emma Bonino as Minister in case of victory.

Though Berlusconi and Veltroni were in opposite parties, they allegedly represent such similar policies that they were dubbed "Veltrusconi". Both candidates supported big tax cuts and generous spending programs.

The Union of Christian and Centre Democrats was invited to support Berlusconi, but refused and decided to run on its own instead. The Rose for Italy originally planned to run alone with Bruno Tabacci as their PM candidate, but shortly before the filing deadline, they decided to form joint lists with the UDC.

== Electoral system ==
The electoral system had been last reformed by Law no. 270, 21 December 2005.

=== Chamber of Deputies ===
For the election of the lower house, all seats in the Chamber of Deputies (excluding one deputy for the region of Aosta Valley and twelve deputies for Italians residing abroad) are allocated based on the national vote in a form of party-list proportional representation with a series of thresholds to encourage parties to form coalitions. Voters cast one vote for a closed list, meaning they cannot express a preference for individual candidates.

Parties can choose to run in coalitions. Seats are first allocated based on coalition votes, then divided among parties belonging to the same coalition by the largest remainder method. To guarantee a working majority, the coalition or party that obtains a plurality of the vote, but fewer than 340 seats, is assigned additional seats to reach that number, which is roughly 54% of all seats.

The autonomous region of Aosta Valley elects one deputy through a first-past-the-post system. Italians abroad are divided into four constituencies, which elect a total of twelve seats based on proportional representation.

=== Senate ===
For the election of the upper house, a similar system is used. However, the results are based on regional, rather than national, vote. This means the coalition or party that wins a plurality of votes in each region is guaranteed a majority of the seats assigned to that region. As this mechanism is region-based, opposing parties or coalitions may benefit from the majority bonus in different regions. It therefore does not guarantee any party or coalition a majority in the Senate.

Three regions have exceptions to the system detailed above. In the region of Molise, that is granted two seats in the Senate, seats are allocated proportionally, with no majority bonus. The region of Aosta Valley, which elects one senator, uses a first-past-the-post system. Finally, the region of Trentino-Alto Adige/Südtirol elects seven senators with a limited compensatory system: six senators are elected in six single-member constituencies, while the seventh is allocated to the most underrepresented list based on the regional votes.

Six seats in the Senate are assigned to Italians living abroad and are allocated using the same system used for the Chamber of Deputies.

== Main coalitions and parties ==
Coalition	Party	Main ideology	Seats			Party leader	Coalition leader
Coalition	Party	Main ideology	C	S	Total	Party leader	Coalition leader
Centre-right coalition	The People of Freedom (PdL)	Liberal conservatism	204	123	327	Silvio Berlusconi	Silvio Berlusconi
Centre-right coalition	Northern League (LN)	Regionalism	22	12	34	Umberto Bossi	Silvio Berlusconi
Centre-right coalition	Movement for Autonomy (MpA)	Regionalism	6	0	6	Raffaele Lombardo	Silvio Berlusconi
Centre-left coalition	Democratic Party (PD)	Social democracy	194	84	278	Walter Veltroni	Walter Veltroni
Centre-left coalition	Italy of Values (IdV)	Anti-corruption politics	17	3	20	Antonio Di Pietro	Walter Veltroni
The Left – The Rainbow (SA)		Communism, democratic socialism	92	46	138	Fausto Bertinotti	
Union of the Centre (UdC)		Christian democracy	36	18	54	Pier Ferdinando Casini	
Socialist Party (PS)		Social democracy	9	3	12	Enrico Boselli	
The Right – Tricolour Flame (LD–FT)		Neo-fascism	4	3	7	Daniela Santanchè	

== Opinion polls ==
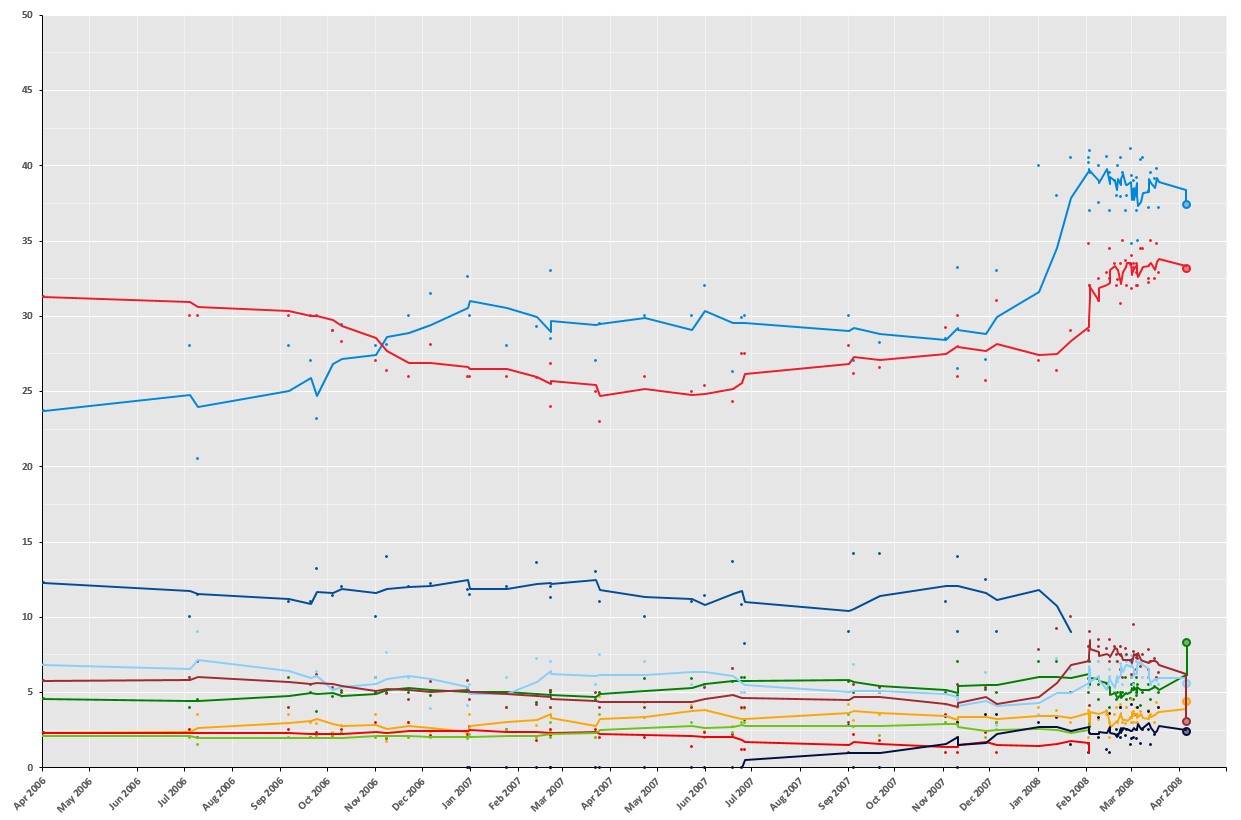
4-point average trend line of poll results from April 2006 to the present day, with each line corresponding to a political party. FI/PdL PD LN UDC IdV PRC/SA AN FdV PdCI LD

== Results ==
=== Chamber of Deputies ===
==== Overall results ====
← Summary of the 13–14 April 2008 Chamber of Deputies election results →
Coalition	Party	Italy (19 regions)			Aosta Valley			Overseas			Total seats	+/–
Coalition	Party	Votes	%	Seats	Votes	%	Seats	Votes	%	Seats	Total seats	+/–
Centre-right coalition	The People of Freedom	13,629,464	37.38	272	13,880	18.52	0	322,437	30.90	4	276	+60
Centre-right coalition	Northern League	3,024,543	8.30	60	2,322	3.10	0	—N/a	—N/a	—N/a	60	+34
Centre-right coalition	Movement for Autonomy	410,499	1.13	8	—N/a	—N/a	—N/a	—N/a	—N/a	—N/a	8	+34
Centre-right coalition	Total seats			340			0			4	344	+53
Centre-left coalition	Democratic Party	12,095,306	33.18	211	—N/a	—N/a	—N/a	338,954	32.48	6	217	−9
Centre-left coalition	Italy of Values	1,594,024	4.37	28	—N/a	—N/a	—N/a	42,149	4.04	1	29	+12
Centre-left coalition	Total seats			239			—			7	246	-101
Union of the Centre		2,050,229	5.62	36	—N/a	—N/a	—N/a	88,017	8.43	0	36	−3
South Tyrolean People's Party		147,718	0.41	2	—N/a	—N/a	—N/a	—N/a	—N/a	—N/a	2	−2
Autonomy Liberty Democracy		—N/a	—N/a	—N/a	29,314	39.12	1	—N/a	—N/a	—N/a	1	±0
Associative Movement of Italians Abroad		—N/a	—N/a	—N/a	—N/a	—N/a	—N/a	86,970	8.33	1	1	New
Others		3,505,498	9.61	0	29,423	39.26	0	164,991	15.82	0	0	—N/a
Total		36,457,254	100	617	74,939	100	1	1,043,518	100	12	630	±0

Popular vote (Party)
PdL	37.38%
PD	33.18%
LN	8.30%
UdC	5.62%
IdV	4.37%
SA	3.08%
LD–FT	2.43%
MpA	1.13%
Others	4.51%

Popular vote (Coalition)
CDX	46.81%
CSX	37.55%
UdC	5.62%
SA	3.08%
LD–FT	2.43%
Others	4.51%

Seat distribution (Coalition)
CDX	55.11%
CSX	38.74%
UdC	5.83%
Others	0.32%

==== Italy (except Aosta Valley) ====
Coalition	Party	Votes	%	Seats
Centre-right coalition	The People of Freedom (PdL)	13,629,464	37.38	272
Centre-right coalition	Northern League (LN)	3,024,543	8.30	60
Centre-right coalition	Movement for Autonomy (MpA)	410,499	1.13	8
Centre-right coalition	Total	17,064,506	46.81	340
Centre-left coalition	Democratic Party (PD)	12,095,306	33.18	211
Centre-left coalition	Italy of Values (IdV)	1,594,024	4.37	28
Centre-left coalition	Total	13,689,303	37.55	239
Union of the Centre (UdC)		2,050,229	5.62	36
The Left – The Rainbow (SA)		1,124,298	3.08	0
The Right – Tricolour Flame (LD–FT)		884,961	2.43	0
Socialist Party (PS)		355,495	0.98	0
Workers' Communist Party (PCL)		208,296	0.57	0
Critical Left (SC)		168,916	0.46	0
South Tyrolean People's Party (SVP)		147,718	0.41	2
Association for Defense of Life		135,535	0.37	0
For the Common Good (PBC)		119,569	0.33	0
New Force (FN)		109,699	0.30	0
Italian Liberal Party (PLI)		104,053	0.29	0
Democratic Union for Consumers (UDpC)		91,106	0.25	0
List of Talking Crickets (No Euro–Lega Padana–others)		66,835	0.18	0
Venetian Republic League (LVR)		31,353	0.09	0
Die Freiheitlichen (DF)		28,340	0.08	0
European Movement Disabled Persons (MEDA)		16,483	0.05	0
Sardinian Action Party (PSd'Az)		14,860	0.04	0
League for Autonomy – Lombard Alliance (LAL)		13,992	0.04	0
Union for South Tyrol (UfS)		12,981	0.04	0
Sardigna Natzione Indipendentzia (SNI)		7,176	0.02	0
Southern League Ausonia (LSA)		4,399	0.01	0
Venetian Agreement (IV)		2,388	0.01	0
Communist Alternative Party (PdAC)		1,993	0.01	0
The Lotus		1,797	0.00	0
Thought and Action Party (PPA)		946	0.00	0
Total		36,457,254	100.00	617

==== Results by region (except Aosta Valley) ====
Region	Centre-right Coalition	Centre-left Coalition	Union of the Centre	The Left – The Rainbow	The Right – Tricolour Flame	Others
Abruzzo	43.2	40.5	5.9	3.2	3.2	4.0
Apulia	47.4	35.6	8.0	3.0	2.1	3.9
Basilicata	37.6	44.5	6.9	3.5	2.3	5.2
Calabria	43.8	36.2	8.2	3.2	2.2	6.4
Campania	51.5	33.9	6.5	2.7	1.6	3.8
Emilia-Romagna	36.4	50.0	4.3	3.0	2.5	3.8
Friuli-Venezia Giulia	47.8	35.7	6.0	3.1	3.0	4.4
Lazio	43.7	40.9	4.8	3.3	3.4	3.9
Liguria	43.6	42.5	3.8	3.7	2.7	3.7
Lombardy	55.1	32.1	4.3	2.9	2.1	3.5
Marche	37.2	45.9	6.0	3.0	3.4	4.5
Molise	41.8	45.6	5.8	1.9	1.7	3.2
Piedmont	47.0	37.4	5.2	3.4	3.2	3.8
Sardinia	43.0	40.0	6.6	3.6	1.5	5.3
Sicily	54.3	28.8	9.4	2.6	2.0	2.9
Trentino-Alto Adige	30.4	27.8	4.2	3.1	2.0	32.5
Tuscany	33.6	50.3	4.2	4.5	2.9	4.5
Umbria	36.1	47.4	4.5	3.5	3.6	4.9
Veneto	54.4	30.8	5.6	2.2	2.0	5.0

==== Aosta Valley ====
The autonomous region of Aosta Valley, in northwestern Italy, elects one member to the Chamber of Deputies through a direct first-past-the-post election. Some parties that formed electoral coalitions in Italy, might have opted to run against one another (or form different coalitions) in this particular region.

Party	Votes	%	Seats
Autonomy Liberty Democracy (ALD)	29,314	39.12	1
Aosta Valley (UV-SA-FA)	28,357	37.84	0
The People of Freedom (PdL)	13,880	18.52	0
Northern League (LN)	2,322	3.10	0
Social Action (AS)	1,066	1.42	0
Total	74,939	100.00	1

==== Overseas constituencies ====
Twelve members of the Chamber of Deputies are elected by Italians abroad. Two members are elected for North America and Central America (including most of the Caribbean), three members for South America (including Trinidad and Tobago), six members for Europe, and one member for the rest of the world (Africa, Asia, Oceania, and Antarctica). Voters in these regions select candidate lists and may also cast a preference vote for individual candidates. The seats are allocated by proportional representation.

The electoral law allows for parties to form different coalitions on the lists abroad, compared to the lists in Italy.

Party	Votes	%	Seats
Democratic Party (PD)	338,954	32.48	6
The People of Freedom (PdL)	322,437	30.90	4
Union of the Centre (UdC)	88,017	8.43	0
Associative Movement of Italians Abroad (MAIE)	86,970	8.33	1
Italian Associations in South America (AISA)	64,325	6.16	0
Italy of Values (IdV)	42,149	4.04	1
Socialist Party (PS)	32,513	3.12	0
The Left – The Rainbow (SA)	28,495	2.73	0
The Right – Tricolour Flame (LD–FT)	14,974	1.43	0
The Other Sicily (LAS)	9,251	0.89	0
Critical Left (SC)	6,062	0.58	0
Italian Civic Consumers (CCI)	4,878	0.47	0
Values and Future (VF)	4,493	0.43	0
Total	1,043,518	100.00	12

==== Map ====

Seat totals by constituency. As this is a MB election, seat totals are determined by the national popular vote, benefiting the largest coalition nationwide.

=== Senate of the Republic ===
==== Overall results ====
← Summary of the 13–14 April 2008 Senate of the Republic election results →
Coalition	Party	Italy (18 regions)			Aosta Valley			Trentino-Alto Adige			Overseas			Total seats	+/–
Coalition	Party	Votes	%	Seats	Votes	%	Seats	Votes	%	Seats	Votes	%	Seats	Total seats	+/–
Centre-right coalition	The People of Freedom	12,511,258	38.17	141	12,167	17.25	0	156,126	28.18	3	322,698	33.86	3	147	+26
Centre-right coalition	Northern League	2,642,280	8.06	25	2,081	2.95	0	—N/a	—N/a	—N/a	—N/a	—N/a	—N/a	25	+11
Centre-right coalition	Movement for Autonomy	355,361	1.08	2	—N/a	—N/a	—N/a	—N/a	—N/a	—N/a	—N/a	—N/a	—N/a	2	+11
Centre-right coalition	Total seats			168			0			3			3	174	+18
Centre-left coalition	Democratic Party	11,042,452	33.69	116	—N/a	—N/a	—N/a	19,253	3.48	0	274,732	30.70	2	118	+10
Centre-left coalition	Italy of Values	1,414,730	4.32	14	—N/a	—N/a	—N/a	—N/a	—N/a	—N/a	38,357	4.02	0	14	+10
Centre-left coalition	Total seats			130			—			0			2	132	-25
South Tyrolean People's Party		—N/a	—N/a	—N/a	—N/a	—N/a	—N/a	252,669	45.61	4	—N/a	—N/a	—N/a	4	+1
Union of the Centre		1,866,356	5.69	3	—N/a	—N/a	—N/a	32,511	5.87	0	57,817	6.07	0	3	−18
Aosta Valley		—N/a	—N/a	—N/a	29,191	41.39	1	—N/a	—N/a	—N/a	—N/a	—N/a	—N/a	1	+1
Associative Movement of Italians Abroad		—N/a	—N/a	—N/a	—N/a	—N/a	—N/a	—N/a	—N/a	—N/a	72,511	7.61	1	1	New
Others		2,941,902	8.98	0	27,151	38.41	0	93,380	16.86	0	187,029	17.74	0	0	—N/a
Total		32,774,339	100	301	70,520	100	1	553,939	100	7	953,144	100	6	315	±0

Popular vote (Party)
PdL	38.17%
PD	33.69%
LN	8.06%
UdC	5.69%
IdV	4.32%
SA	3.21%
LD–FT	2.10%
MpA	1.08%
Others	3.68%

Popular vote (Coalition)
CDX	47.32%
CSX	38.01%
UdC	5.69%
SA	3.21%
LD–FT	2.10%
Others	3.68%

Seat distribution for coalition
CDX	55.24%
CSX	41.90%
UdC	0.95%
Others	0.98%

==== Italy (except Aosta Valley and Trentino-Alto Adige) ====
Coalition	Party	Votes	%	Seats
Centre-right coalition	The People of Freedom (PdL)	12,511,258	38.17	141
Centre-right coalition	Northern League (LN)	2,642,280	8.06	25
Centre-right coalition	Movement for Autonomy (MpA)	355,361	1.08	2
Centre-right coalition	Total	15,508,899	47.32	168
Centre-left coalition	Democratic Party (PD)	11,042,452	33.69	116
Centre-left coalition	Italy of Values (IdV)	1,414,730	4.32	14
Centre-left coalition	Total	12,457,182	38.01	130
Union of the Centre (UdC)		1,866,356	5.69	3
The Left – The Rainbow (SA)		1,053,228	3.21	0
The Right – Tricolour Flame (LD–FT)		686,926	2.10	0
Socialist Party (PS)		284,837	0.87	0
Workers' Communist Party (PCL)		180,442	0.55	0
Critical Left (SC)		136,679	0.42	0
For the Common Good (PBC)		105,827	0.32	0
Italian Liberal Party (PLI)		100,759	0.31	0
New Force (FN)		85,564	0.26	0
Democratic Union for Consumers (UDpC)		78,139	0.24	0
List of Talking Crickets (No Euro–Lega Padana–others)		49,535	0.15	0
Venetian Republic League (LVR)		47,647	0.15	0
League for Autonomy – Lombard Alliance (LAL)		45,623	0.14	0
European Movement Disabled Persons (MEDA)		19,899	0.06	0
Sardinian Action Party (PSd'Az)		15,280	0.05	0
United Populars (PU)		12,389	0.04	0
Marxist–Leninist Italian Communist Party (PCIM-L)		8,094	0.02	0
Southern League Ausonia (LSA)		7,109	0.02	0
Sardigna Natzione Indipendentzia (SNI)		6,972	0.02	0
Independentist Front Lombardy (FIL)		5,234	0.02	0
Venetian Agreement (IV)		4,600	0.01	0
Party of the South (PdS)		3,727	0.01	0
Free South		1,795	0.01	0
Thought and Action Party (PPA)		1,597	0.00	0
Total		32,774,339	100.00	301

==== Aosta Valley ====
Party	Votes	%	Seats
Aosta Valley (UV-SA-FA)	29,191	41.39	1
Autonomy Liberty Democracy (ALD)	26,377	37.40	0
The People of Freedom (PdL)	12,167	17.25	0
Northern League (LN)	2,081	2.95	0
Social Action (AS)	712	1.01	0
Total	70,520	100.00	1

==== Trentino-Alto Adige/South Tyrol ====
Party	Votes	%	Seats
The People of Freedom (PdL)	156,126	28.18	3
SVP - Together for the Autonomies	153,721	27.75	2
South Tyrolean People's Party (SVP)	98,948	17.86	2
The Left – The Rainbow (SA)	39,957	7.21	0
Union of the Centre (UdC)	32,511	5.87	0
Die Freiheitlichen (DF)	24,772	4.47	0
Democratic Party (PD)	19,253	3.48	0
The Right – Tricolour Flame (LD–FT)	16,462	2.97	0
Union for South Tyrol (UfS)	11,820	2.13	0
Socialist Party (PS)	369	0.07	0
Total	553,939	100.00	7

==== Overseas constituencies ====
Party	Votes	%	Seats
The People of Freedom (PdL)	322,698	33.86	3
Democratic Party (PD)	314,703	33.02	2
Associative Movement of Italians Abroad (MAIE)	72,511	7.61	1
Italian Associations in South America (AISA)	60,794	6.38	0
Union of the Centre (UdC)	57,817	6.07	0
Italy of Values (IdV)	38,357	4.02	0
Socialist Party (PS)	28,149	2.95	0
The Left - The Rainbow (SA)	27,067	2.84	0
The Right – Tricolour Flame (LD–FT)	13,139	1.38	0
The Other Sicily (LAS)	8,391	0.88	0
Critical Left (SC)	5,855	0.61	0
Italian Civic Consumers (CCI)	3,663	0.38	0
Total	953,144	100.00	6

==== Seats by region ====
Region	Coalitions				Majority bonus winner	Senators
Region	Centre-right coalition	Centre-left coalition	Union of the Centre	Others	Majority bonus winner	Senators
Lombardy	19 (PdL); 11 (LN)	15 (PD); 2 (IdV)			CDX	47
Campania	18 (PdL)	10 (PD); 2 (IdV)			CDX	30
Lazio	15 (PdL)	11 (PD); 1 (IdV)			CDX	27
Sicily	13 (PdL); 2 (MpA)	7 (PD); 1 (IdV)	3 (UdC)		CDX	26
Veneto	8 (PdL); 7 (LN)	8 (PD); 1 (IdV)			CDX	24
Piedmont	10 (PdL); 3 (LN)	8 (PD); 1 (IdV)			CDX	22
Emilia-Romagna	7 (PdL); 2 (LN)	11 (PD); 1 (IdV)			CSX	21
Apulia	12 (PdL)	8 (PD); 1 (IdV)			CDX	21
Tuscany	7 (PdL)	10 (PD); 1 (IdV)			CSX	18
Calabria	6 (PdL)	4 (PD)			CDX	10
Sardinia	5 (PdL)	4 (PD)			CDX	9
Liguria	4 (PdL); 1 (LN)	3 (PD)			CDX	8
Marche	3 (PdL)	5 (PD)			CSX	8
Abruzzo	4 (PdL)	2 (PD); 1 (IdV)			CDX	7
Friuli-Venezia Giulia	3 (PdL); 1 (LN)	3 (PD)			CDX	7
Trentino-Alto Adige/Südtirol	3 (PdL)			2 (SVP - IpA); 2 (SVP)	N/A	7
Umbria	3 (PdL)	4 (PD)			CSX	7
Basilicata	3 (PdL)	3 (PD); 1 (IdV)			CSX	7
Molise	1 (PdL)	1 (PD)			N/A	2
Aosta Valley				1 (VA)	N/A	1
Italians abroad	3 (PdL)	2 (PD)		1 (MAIE)	N/A	6
Total	174	132	3	5		315

==== Map ====

Seat totals by constituency. As this is a MB election, seat totals are determined by the national popular vote, benefiting the largest coalition in each region.

== See also ==
- Politics of Italy
- History of the Italian Republic#Second Republic (1992–present)
- 2008 Italian Senate election, North and Central American division
- 2008 Italian general election in Lombardy
