= Mirko Tremaglia =

Italian politician and lawyer (1926–2011)

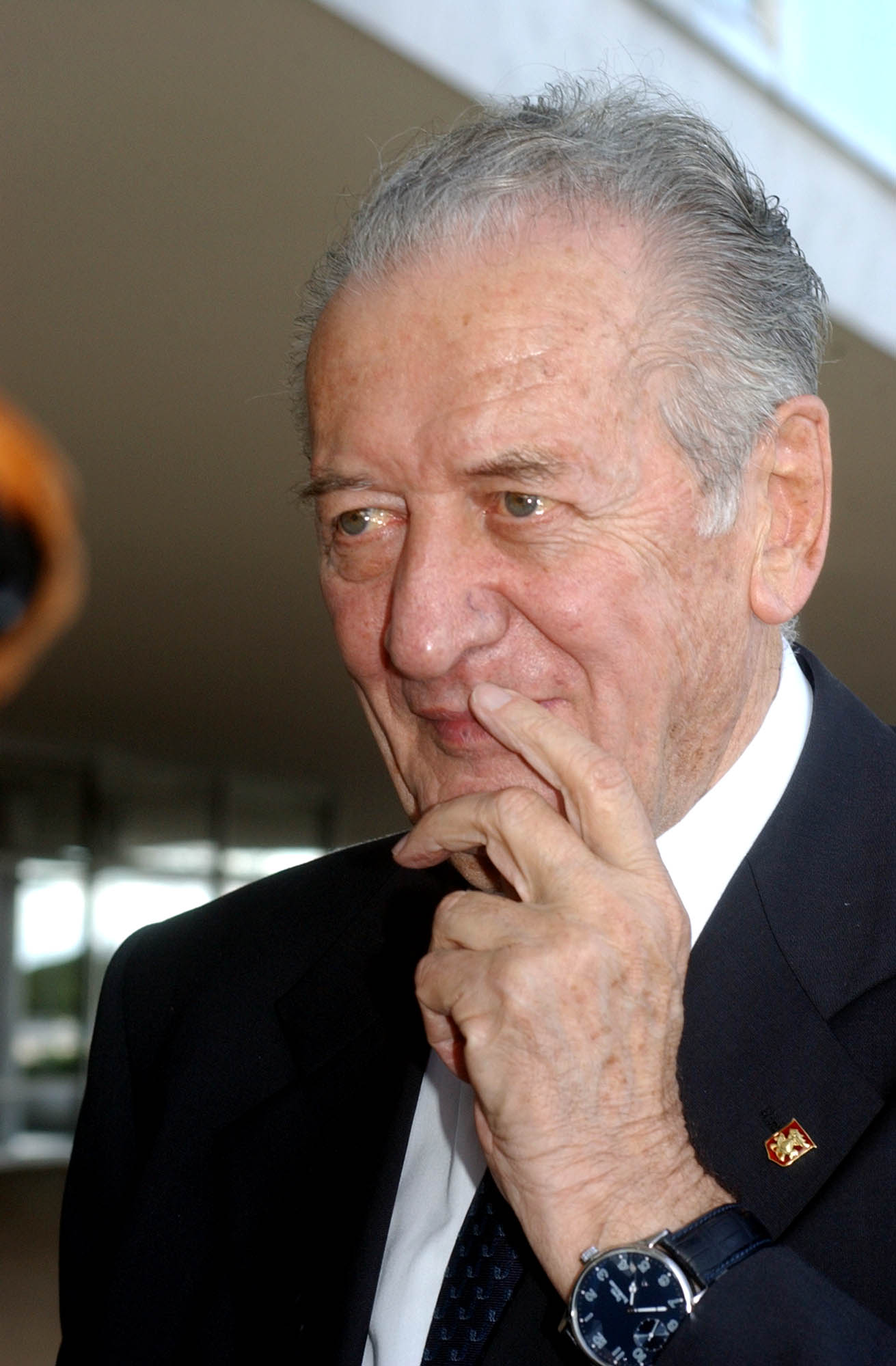

Minister of Italians in the World
- In office 11 June 2001 – 17 May 2006
- Prime Minister: Silvio Berlusconi

Member of the Chamber of Deputies
- In office 25 May 1972 – 30 December 2011
- Constituency: Lombardy 2

Personal details
- Born: 17 November 1926 Bergamo, Italy
- Died: 30 December 2011 (aged 85) Bergamo, Italy
- Party: PFR (1944–1945); MSI (1946–1995); AN (1995–2009); PdL (2009–2010); FLI (2010–2011)
- Education: Università Cattolica del Sacro Cuore
- Profession: Politician, lawyer

Mirko Tremaglia (17 November 1926 – 30 December 2011) was an Italian politician and lawyer. Famous for his youth as a fascist soldier, he was one of the most important exponents of the Italian far-right politics during the "First Republic" Italian period (1948-1994).

== Biography ==
Born in Bergamo, Tremaglia grew up assimilating the ideas of the Italian fascism in his childhood and adolescence. During World War II, at the age of 17, he fought in the National Republican Guard belonging to the Italian Social Republic, a puppet state controlled by Nazi Germany. In the following months, Tremaglia lost both parents, and was taken as a prisoner by the Allies, then interned in Coltano prisoner-of-war camp for fascist prisoners.

After the post-war period, Tremaglia enrolled at the Catholic University of Milan but was kicked out of it when his past as a National Republican Guard volunteer was discovered. Later, he graduated in law and then began practicing as a lawyer. He was also a co-founder of the Italian Social Movement in 1946 and of its successor, the National Alliance, in 1995. Between 2001 and 2006, he served as minister without portfolio of Italians in the World in the second and third Berlusconi cabinets. Under this government, he is remembered for the Law 459 of 2001 "for the exercise of the right to vote of Italian citizens resident abroad", known as Tremaglia Law. In 2008, he joined The People of Freedom but in 2010 followed Gianfranco Fini into his new party Future and Freedom. Tremaglia died at his home in Bergamo after a long distress with Parkinson's disease.

== Controversies ==
Tremaglia found himself at the center of a controversy for defending the well-known anti-homosexuality Roman Catholic colleague Rocco Buttiglione after the 2004 European Parliament election. He stated: "Unfortunately Buttiglione has lost. Poor Europe: fags are among the majority government." For this statement. Tremaglia was reprimanded and criticized by several members of various parties of the Italian political spectrum.

== See also ==
- For Italy in the World
