= World Radio TV Handbook =

Yearly worldwide broadcasting directory

- Predecessor: World Radio Handbook
- Founded: 1947
- Founder: Oluf Lund Johansen
- Country of origin: Germany
- Headquarters location: Freising
- Publication types: Directories
- Owner: Radio Data Center (RDC)
- Official website: www.wrth.info

The World Radio TV Handbook, also known as WRTH, is a comprehensive directory of global broadcasting. It contains most radio stations with FM or AM transmitters as well as TV stations, published yearly. The focus is on frequencies, television channels and effective transmitter powers. The listings of international broadcasting and shortwave radio contain schedules. For major broadcasters, addresses, telephone numbers and e-mail are given.

Started in 1947, it became one of the most important references for the DXing community, hobbyists trying to receive distant radio broadcasting. The German based Radio Data Center (RDC) which links DXing and professional data services has published the WRTH since 2022. including an app and an online version.

== History ==
The WRTH was started in 1947 by Oluf Lund Johansen (1891–1975) as the World Radio Handbook (WRH). The first edition that bears an edition number is the 4th edition, published in 1949. The three previous editions appear to have been:

- the 1st edition, marked "Winter Ed. 1947" on the cover and completed in November 1947
- the 2nd edition, marked "1948 (May–November)" on the cover and completed in May 1948
- the 3rd edition, marked "1948-49" on the cover and completed in November 1948.
- the 80th edition, "2026", was the last printed version

Issues with covers in Danish are known to have been available for the years 1948 May–November (2d ed.), 1950-51 (5th ed.; cover and 1st page in Danish, rest in English, most ads in Danish), 1952 (6th ed.; cover and 1st page in Danish, rest in English, most ads in Danish), and probably others. The 1952 English ed., which is completely in English, has an extra page with world times and agents, and ads in English which are sometimes different from the ads in the Danish edition. German editions appeared at least between the years 1953-1955 under the title "Rundfunk Fernseh Jahrbuch".

Oluf Lund Johansen published, in conjunction with Libreria Hispanoamericana of Barcelona, Spain, a softbound Spanish-language version of the 1960 WRTH. The book was printed in Spain and called Guia Mundial de Radio y Television, and carried the WRTH logo at the time as well as all the editorial references contained in the English-language version.

The word "TV" was added to the title in 1965, when Jens M. Frost (1919–1999) took over as editor. It had then already included data for television broadcasting for some years. Summer Supplements appear to have been issued from 1959 through 1971. From 1959 through 1966 they were called the Summer Supplement. From 1967 through 1971 they were called the Summer Edition. Through the 1969 edition, the WRTH indicated the date on which the manuscript was completed. Hardbound editions are known to have been available for the years 1963 through 1966, 1968, 1969, and 1975–1978, and probably others.

After the 40th edition in 1986, Frost handed over editorship to Andrew G. (Andy) Sennitt.

While offering comprehensive information about AM radio, the FM section could only list major stations for reasons of capacity. In order to fill this gap, German DXer Günter Lorenz started the publication of FMLIST in 1986, which has grown to the world’s most comprehensive database for FM broadcasting with editors from the DX community around the world. It was soon supplemented by MWLIST, the counterpart for medium and shortwave radio. Since his company RDC took over the publication of the WRTH, both databases have become the main source for the book.

== Publications ==
- Various authors World Radio TV Handbook 75th ed. 2021, WRTH Publications Limited, 2020 ISBN 978-1-9998300-3-8.
