= The Right – Tricolour Flame =

- Leader: Daniela Santanchè
- Founded: 15 February 2008
- Dissolved: 2009
- Headquarters: Rome
- Membership: unknown
- Ideology: Neo-fascism; Italian nationalism
- Political position: Far-right

The Right–Tricolour Flame (La Destra–Fiamma Tricolore) was an Italian political coalition formed by two neofascist parties: The Right of Francesco Storace and Tricolour Flame of Luca Romagnoli on 15 February 2008 in the run-up to the 2008 general election.

Daniela Santanchè was the candidate for Prime Minister of Italy. The list received 885,229 or 2.43% of the popular vote in the 2008 general elections and was awarded no representatives in the Chamber of Deputies or the Senate.

== Compostition ==
Party	Leader	Main ideology	Position
The Right	Francesco Storace	Neo-fascism	Far-right
Tricolour Flame	Luca Romagnoli	Neo-fascism	Far-right
