= Gino Bucchino =

Italian politician

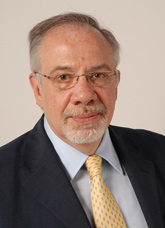
Gino Bucchino

Gino Bucchino (born 1948) is the overseas member of the Italian Chamber of Deputies for North America and Central America.

Bucchino is a doctor in Toronto, Ontario, and was elected as a member of L'Unione (led by Romano Prodi).

In 2011, he claimed that President Silvio Berlusconi had attempted to bribe him into switching his party allegiance.

== Biography ==
In the 2006 general election, he was elected to the Chamber of Deputies on the L'Unione ticket in the Overseas – North and Central America constituency and joined the Democratic Party (Italy) caucus.

Alle elezioni politiche del 2008 è stato rieletto alla Camera dei Deputati con il Democratic Party (Italy) nella circoscrizione Estero – Nord e Centro America.

In February 2011, he publicly denounced an alleged attempt at bribery, claiming that a young member of the Socialist Refoundation Party had promised him 150,000 euros and re-election—with Denis Verdini guarantee—if he joined the centre-right parliamentary majority and supported Silvio Berlusconi.
