= Dom Serafini =

Italian journalist and publisher

Domenico "Dom" Serafini (born 1949) is an Italian journalist and author, based in New York City. He is the editor-in-chief of VideoAge International, a premier television trade publication.

== Early life ==
Dom Serafini was born in 1949 in the Italian fishing village and resort town of Giulianova. At age 18 he moved to New York City to study color television, which had fascinated him since age 14.

In New York, Serafini first lived with his aunt Yole on Long Island. He worked as a correspondent for JCE Publications for Milan, Italy, while attending Empire State College at night. In 1971 he expanded his contributions as a freelance writer to a local newspaper, and eventually started working with large, international journals, including RadioWorld and Videography, always writing on the subject of television.

In 1976, Serafini helped co-found Millecanali, Italy's first professional television magazine, for JCE Publications. In 1977, he became the Italian coordinator of the American magazine Consumer Electronics. In 1978, he was appointed international editor of Television/Radio Age.

== VideoAge ==
In 1981, with the support of the American, Italian, French and Brazilian TV industries, Serafini launched a professional TV trade magazine called VideoAge International. In 1982, Serafini he to the television industry the concept of "market dailies" (daily publications published only during TV trade shows).

Subsequently, he launched publications such as GameShow Magazine, for U.S. consumers; TV Pro, France's first TV trade publication; TV Era, Latin America's first TV trade publication, and, in Italy, Baseball Magazine, none of which succeeded.

In 1983, he opened VideoAge's editorial office in Los Angeles. In 1988, VideoAge's New York City editorial offices moved from their original East 51st Street location to the present East 75th Street location, which happened to be Andy Warhol's former residence.

VideoAge is the only professional TV trade publication that does not require the use of salespeople. It takes pride in its editorial staff.

== Published books ==
- Television Via Internet
- AbruzzoAmerica (a collaboration with Generoso D'Agnese)
- Veltroni and I
- The Ten Commandments for the TV of the Future
- "O Sole Mio" It's Now or Never
- History of Television

== Political involvement and recent developments ==
From 2001 to 2005, Serafini was an official advisor to the Italian Ministry of Communication. In 2006 and again in 2013 Serafini ran to represent Italian expatriates in North America in the Italian Senate (2006) and Italian Chamber of Deputies (2013).

He continues to write about politics and television for several Italian, Canadian and American weekly and daily publications.

== Sources ==
- http://www.domserafini.net
- http://www.videoage.org
