= For Italy in the World =

For Italy in the World Per l'Italia nel Mondo
- Leader: Mirko Tremaglia
- Founded: 2006
- Ideology: Interests of Italians abroad
- Political position: Right-wing

For Italy in the World (Italian: Per l'Italia nel Mondo) was a political party in Italy, active with voters living abroad, which refers to Mirko Tremaglia, member of National Alliance party and Minister for Italians Abroad in the Berlusconi II cabinet. The party affiliated to the "House of Freedoms", the centre-right coalition led by Silvio Berlusconi.

The list ran in the 2006 Italian general election, and won one seat in the Lower House for Giuseppe Angeli, who joined National Alliance's group.
