= Alliance for Peace and Freedom =

Far-right European political alliance

- Abbreviation: APF
- President/Chairman: Roberto Fiore
- Vice-Chairman: Nick Griffin
- Founded: 4 February 2015
- Preceded by: European National Front
- Headquarters: Sentier de Montigny 6060, Gilly, Belgium
- Think tank: Europa Terra Nostra
- Ideology: Ultranationalism; Neo-fascism; Faction: Neo-Nazism (Note: Several parties, such as the Die Heimat or the now-defunct DSSS, are openly neo-Nazi or, like DN, have clear ties to neo-Nazism. Several board members such as Tomáš Vandas or Stefan Jacobsson are or have past leadership in neo-Nazi parties.)
- Political position: Far-right
- European Parliament group: Non-Inscrits

Website
- apfeurope.eu

The Alliance for Peace and Freedom (APF) is a far-right European political alliance and former European political party founded on 4 February 2015. The main member parties were involved in the defunct European National Front.

The alliance wishes to establish a network of nationalist movements across Europe that will cooperate to strengthen their shared ideals. It cooperates and supports other nationalist groups across Europe that are not members, these include former party members Golden Dawn, Tricolour Flame, Alternative for Sweden and the ELAM. The alliance is described as neo-Nazi by several newspapers, and neo-fascist by others.

The group works for "a Europe of sovereign nations in which the independent states work together on a confederated basis", and for the perennity and the safeguarding of ancestral European traditions such as the Christian tradition.

== Europa Terra Nostra ==
The Europa Terra Nostra is the official European political foundation of the APF. The ETN was founded 3 July 2015 in Berlin where it continues to operate as the official think-tank of the APF and serves as the European framework for national foundations/think-tanks recognised by APF member-parties.

== International connections ==
The APF works to co-ordinate European nationalist parties across the continent. It helped establish the Italy for the Italians coalition composed of APF member New Force along with Tricolour Flame. In 2017 the APF aided in the formation of the National Identity Bloc in Europe coalition, APF members, United Romania Party and Noua Dreaptă joined forces with the Greater Romania Party. In 2019 The APF played a part in forming the ADÑ Identidad Española coalition, composed of APF member National Democracy, FE-JONS, Spanish Alternative and La Falange.

The party also maintains contacts with the former leader of the National Front, Jean-Marie Le Pen, who was expelled from his party in 2015. He joined the group in March 2018 as an Honorary Chairman and held this position until his death in January 2025.

The APF maintains contacts with conservative circles in Russia with the group being invited to conferences hosted by the Kremlin. The party supports Vladimir Putin and United Russia's leadership of Russia, especially in the Russo-Ukrainian War and Syrian Civil War. The party is supportive of Alexander Lukashenko and maintains contacts with the Liberal Democratic Party of Belarus.

The APF strongly supports Serbian nationalists and is opposed to international recognition of Kosovo, it has worked in the past with the Serbian Radical Party. On 26 September 2021, the APF held a conference in Belgrade hosted by the Serbian Right.

It maintained friendly relations with the Syrian Arab Socialist Ba'ath Party government with deputy chairman, Nick Griffin being invited to Syria by Bashar al-Assad multiple times as an ambassador. Meetings between the party and the Syrian Social Nationalist Party have been held with the AFP publicly supporting the SSNP. The group maintains contacts with Hezbollah and has hosted at least one meeting with Hezbollah leaders. Michel Aoun, then president of Lebanon, received a delegation of the APF in 2018 and in 2019, and the group claims to have been in regular contact with him and his party.

== Member parties ==
Country	Party	Leader	Political group in 2024–2029 term	European Parliament	National lower houses	Position in national legislature
Belgium	Nation	Hervé Van Laethem	None	0 / 21	0 / 150	No seats
Belgium	Flanders and Identity; Vlaanderen Identitair (VLI)	Rob Verreycken	None	0 / 21	0 / 150	No seats
France	Jeanne Committees (Associate); Comités Jeanne (CJ)	Vacant	None	0 / 74	0 / 577	No seats
France	The Nationalists; Les Nationalistes	Yvan Benedetti	None	0 / 74	0 / 577	No seats
Germany	The Homeland; Die Heimat	Peter Schreiber	None	0 / 96	0 / 709	No seats
Greece	Popular Greek Patriotic Union; Laiki Elliniki Patriotiki Enosi (LEPEN)	Christos Rigas	None	0 / 21	0 / 300	No seats
Italy	New Force; Forza Nuova (FN)	Roberto Fiore	None	0 / 73	0 / 630	No seats
Netherlands	Dutch People's Union Nederlandse Volks-Unie (NVU)	Constant Kusters	None	0 / 14	0 / 150	No seats
Romania	New Right; Noua Dreaptă (ND)	Tudor Ionescu	None	0 / 32	0 / 136	No seats
Slovakia	People's Party - Our Slovakia; Ľudová strana – Naše Slovensko (ĽSNS)	Marian Kotleba	None	0 / 14	0 / 150	No seats
Spain	National Democracy; Democracia Nacional (DN)	Luis Mateos de Vega	None	0 / 54	0 / 350	No seats

=== Former member parties ===
Country	Party	Abbr.	Leader	Left the AFP
Czech Republic	Workers' Party of Social Justice; Czech: Dělnická strana sociální spravedlnosti	DSSS	Tomáš Vandas	2024 (party dissolved)
Denmark	Party of the Danes; Danish: Danskernes Parti	DP	Daniel Carlsen	2017 (party dissolved)
France	The French Dissent; French: La Dissidence Française	DF	Vincent Vauclin	2020 (party dissolved)
Greece	Golden Dawn; Greek: Χρυσή Αυγή	ΧΑ	Nikolaos Michaloliakos	2020 (party banned)
Greece	National Popular Consciousness; Ethnikí Laïkí Syneídisi	ELASYN	Giannis Lagos	2023 (party dissolved)
Romania	United Romania Party; Romanian: Partidul România Unită	PRU	Robert Bugă	2019 (party dissolved)
Sweden	Party of the Swedes; Swedish: Svenskarnas parti	SvP	Stefan Jacobsson	2015 (party dissolved)
Spain	The Phalanx; Spanish: La Falange	FE/La Falange	Manuel Andrino Lobo	2024 (party dissolved)

== Executive Board ==
Member	Position	Country	Political party
Roberto Fiore	President/Chairman	Italy	FN
Nick Griffin	Deputy chairman	United Kingdom	
Jean-Marie Le Pen	Honorary chairman	France	CJ
Tomáš Vandas	Board member	Czech Republic	
Gonzalo Martín García	Board member	Spain	DN
Hervé Van Laethem	Board member	Belgium	Nation
Olivier Wyssa	Board member	France	
Martin Beluský	Board member	Slovakia	ĽSNS
Ingo Stawitz	Board member	Germany	NPD

== MEPs ==
=== Eighth European Parliament (2014–2019) ===
Member	Political group	Country	Political party
Jean Marie Le Pen	Non-Inscrits	France	CJ
Udo Voigt	Non-Inscrits	Germany	NPD

=== Ninth European Parliament (2019–2024) ===
Member	Political group	Country	Political party
Ioannis Lagos	Non-Inscrits	Greece	ELASYN

== See also ==
- Europe of Sovereign Nations Group (2024–present)
- Alliance of European National Movements (2009–2019)
- Euronat (1997–2009)
- European political party
- Authority for European Political Parties and European Political Foundations
- European political foundation
- International Sovereigntist League
