= United Right (Italy) =

United Right Destre Unite
- Secretary: Massimiliano Panero
- Deputy Secretary: Pietro Ricca
- Founded: 22 March 2014
- Split from: Social Right
- Headquarters: Via Vittorio Amedeo II, 6; 10121 Turin
- Ideology: National conservatism Right-wing populism Neo-fascism
- Political position: Far-right
- National affiliation: with Royal Italy (2022)
- European affiliation: Alliance of European National Movements

Website
- nuovaitaliaunita.it

The Movement for United Right (Movimento per le Destre Unite), since 2020 also known as New United Italy (Nuova Italia Unita), is a small political party in Italy.

== History ==
The movement was born in 2014 on the occasion of the Piedmontese regional election, as the Movement for National Alliance, a federation of The Right, the Social Right, Future and Freedom and I the South. In that competition United Right took the 0.25% of the vote and it didn't elect any regional councillor. The political activity of the movement was then continued by its leader Massimiliano Panero, a former member of Tricolour Flame.

In the 2018 general election United Right made an alliance with the movement of Pitchforks and it ran only in some regions for the Senate, getting only 6,229 preferences and the 0.02% of the vote.

In 2019, on the occasion of the European Parliament election, United Right made an alliance with CasaPound. The list is exempt from the presentation of the collection of signatures as it is a member of the AENM, represented in the European Parliament by the Hungarian MEP Bela Kovacs.

== Electoral Results ==
=== Italian Parliament ===
Election	Leader	Senate of the Republic			
Election	Leader	Votes	%	Seats	+/–
2022	Massimiliano Panero	2,415 (Note: In a joint list with Royal Italy.)	0.01	0 / 200	New

=== European Parliament ===
Election	Leader	Votes	%	Seats	+/–	EP Group
2019	Massimiliano Panero	89,142	0.33	0 / 76	New	–
