= Social Right (political party) =

Social Right Destra Sociale
- President: Luca Romagnoli
- Coordinator: Lamberto Iacobelli
- Founded: 16 December 2013
- Dissolved: 6 October 2023
- Split from: Tricolour Flame
- Ideology: National conservatism Nationalism; Social conservatism
- Political position: Far-right
- National affiliation: Brothers of Italy

Website
- www.destrasociale.eu

Social Right (Destra Sociale) was a cultural association and faction within Brothers of Italy. Its leader is Luca Romagnoli.

== History ==
It was formed following the expulsion of Luca Romagnoli from the Tricolour Flame, after he joined together other parties the Movement for National Alliance without having preventively sought the opinion of the Central Committee.

In 2014, on the occasion of the Piedmontese and local elections, Social Right, together with The Right led by Storace, Future and Freedom led by Roberto Menia and I the South led by Poli Bortone, joined the United Right (Destre Unite).

In 2015, instead, on the occasion of the regional and local elections, Social Right presented its candidates into the lists of Brothers of Italy.

On 12 November 2017, the Social Right, together with the other far-right movements Making Front (Fare Fronte) led by Roberto Jonghi Lavarini, National Freedom (Libertà Nazionale) led by Fabio Flenda, Right Renewal (Rinnovamento di Destra) led by Vetullio Mussolini, and National Flame (Fiamma Nazionale) led Stefano Salmè, founded in Milan the cultural political movement Long Live Italy (Viva L'Italia) and joined the political-electoral project of the Brothers of Italy.

On 6 October 2023 Social Right stops officially to exist.
