= Schittulli Political Movement =

Italian political party

Schittulli Political Movement (Italian: Movimento Politico Schittulli) is a political party in Italy active in Apulia, founded in 2009 by the surgeon Francesco Schittulli.

== History ==
The party was launched in 2009 as electoral list for the candidacy of Francesco Schittulli to the presidency of the province of Bari. Schittulli, supported by the centre-right coalition, won the electoral competition with 50.05% of the vote, while the Schittulli Movement obtained 9.5% of the vote and 5 provincial councillors.

In 2010 Schittulli organized his list into a full-fledged party.

Schittulli was a candidate for president in the 2015 Apulian regional election, but after the political breaking between Raffaele Fitto and Silvio Berlusconi he was supported by only a part of the centre-right coalition (Schittulli Political Movement, Popular Area, Over with Fitto and Brothers of Italy), while Forza Italia supported the candidacy of Adriana Poli Bortone. Finally, Schittulli finished third, behind Michele Emiliano (Democratic Party) and Antonella Laricchia (Five Star Movement), but surpassing the other centre-right candidate, Adriana Poli Bortone. Schittulli obtained 18.29% of the vote, while his movement (in a single list with Popular Area) obtained 6.36% of the vote and 4 seats in the regional council.

In 2021 the Schittulli Movement enters into a political agreement with Us with Italy, with the prospect of presenting joint lists in local elections.
