= Movement for National Alliance =

Movement for the National Alliance Movimento per Alleanza Nazionale
- Leader: Roberto Menia
- Founded: 8 November 2013
- Dissolved: 2014
- Succeeded by: United Right
- Ideology: National conservatism
- Political position: Right-wing

The Movement for the National Alliance (Italian: Movimento per Alleanza Nazionale) was a coalition of right-wing political parties in Italy, which was an unsuccessful attempt to refound the National Alliance.

== History ==
On 8 November 2013, Luca Romagnoli, secretary of Tricolour Flame, together with the secretary of The Right Francesco Storace, the regent of Future and Freedom Roberto Menia, the leader of I the South Adriana Poli Bortone, Domenico Nania of the association Nuova Alleanza, Oreste Tofani of the association Nazione Sovrana, Antonio Buonfiglio of the association Il Popolo della Vita and Roberto Buonasorte, editor of the online newspaper Il Giornale d'Italia, founded the Movement for National Alliance, a federation of right-wing movements inspired by National Alliance (AN), a party which had merged with Forza Italia to form The People of Freedom in 2009.

The Social Right was formed on the 16 December 2013 following the expulsion of Luca Romagnoli from the Tricolour Flame, after he joined together with other parties to found the Movement for National Alliance without having preventively sought the opinion of the Central Committee.

In December 2013, the "National Alliance Foundation", the association in charge of administering the assets of the defunct party, authorised the Brothers of Italy (FdI), supported by Alemanno and Urso, to use the logo of AN in the 2014 European Parliament election, despite opposition from the Movement for National Alliance, as well as the former members of AN who had joined FI including senators Maurizio Gasparri and Altero Matteoli.

In the 2014 Piedmontese regional election and 2014 Local elections in Foggia, Biella, Vercelli and Reggio Calabria, the FLI ran together with The Right, I the South and the Social Right as "United Right" (Destre Unite), but don't win any seats. elections.

Menia, declared the experience of FLI, founded the National Action which in 2017 would merge into the National Movement for Sovereignty of Storace.

== Composition ==
Parties	Main ideology	Leaders
Future and Freedom (FLI)	Conservatism	Roberto Menia
Tricolour Flame (FT)	Neo-fascism	Luca Romagnoli
The Right	National conservatism	Francesco Storace
I the South (IS)	Regionalism	Adriana Poli Bortone
New Alliance (NA)	Liberal conservatism	Domenico Nania
Sovereign Nation (NS)	Souverainism	Oreste Tofani
The People of Life	Familialism	Antonio Buonfiglio

== Electoral results ==
=== Regional Councils ===
Region	Latest election	# of overall votes	% of overall vote	# of overall seats won	+/–
Piedmont	2014	5,004 (#16) (as United Right)	0.25	0 / 50	–
