= Conservatives and Reformists =

Conservatives and Reformists may refer to:

- European Conservatives and Reformists Group, a group in the European Parliament
- European Conservatives and Reformists Party, a European-wide political party based around the European Conservatives and Reformists
- Conservatives and Reformists (Italy), a political party in Italy named after the European Conservatives and Reformists
