= Luca Romagnoli =

Italian politician

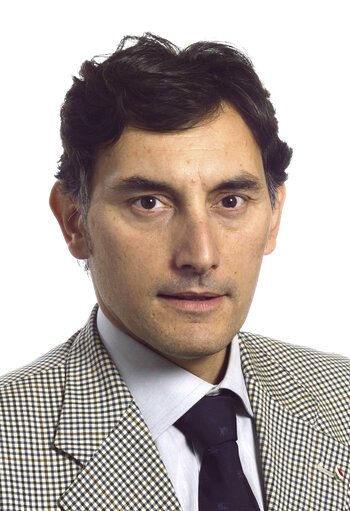

National Secretary of Tricolour Flame
- In office 10 February 2002 – 9 December 2013
- Preceded by: Pino Rauti
- Succeeded by: Attilio Carelli

Member of the European Parliament for Southern Italy
- In office 20 July 2004 – 13 July 2009

Personal details
- Born: 12 September 1961 (age 64) Rome, Italy
- Party: Italian Social Movement (until 1995); Tricolour Flame (1995–2013); Social Right (2013–present); Brothers of Italy (2015–present)
- Occupation: Professor

Luca Romagnoli (born 12 September 1961 in Rome) is an Italian politician and former Member of the European Parliament for Southern Italy with the neo-fascist party Tricolour Flame, being a Non-Inscrit (for a short time, ITS group member) in the European Parliament.

He sat on its Committee on Transport and Tourism, and was a substitute for the Committee on Employment and Social Affairs and a member of the Delegation for relations with Mercosur.

On 8 November 2013, Luca Romagnoli, secretary of Tricolour Flame, together with the secretary of The Right Francesco Storace, the regent of Future and Freedom Roberto Menia, the leader of I the South Adriana Poli Bortone, Domenico Nania of the association New Alliance, Oreste Tofani of the association Nazione Sovrana, Antonio Buonfiglio of the association Il Popolo della Vita and Roberto Buonasorte, editor of the online newspaper Il Giornale d'Italia, founded the Movement for National Alliance, a federation of right movements inspired to National Alliance. On 9 December 2013 the Central Committee of Tricolour Flame distrusted Luca Romagnoli, because he joined this initiative without having preventively sought the opinion of the same Committee.

Following the expulsion from Tricolour Flame, Romagnoli founded his new political movement, Social Right. Destra Sociale and Romagnoli later joined Brothers of Italy.

== Education ==
- 1989: Graduate in geography (University of Rome La Sapienza)

== Career ==
- 1989-1990: worked as a researcher for Oceansismica S.p.A.
- carried out research at the University of Maputo in Mozambique (1991) and Trinity College, Dublin
- 1990-1993: research doctorate in geography
- researcher at the Department of Human Geography of the Faculty of Letters and Philosophy of 'La Sapienza' University, Rome
- 2004: associate professor in the scientific disciplinary sector of geography
- Carried out research in the context of professional collaboration with
- Pio V Institute of Political Studies, the Ministry of Labour and Censuses
- 2002-2013: National Secretary of the Tricolour Flame
- Author of numerous articles, scientific articles and reviews

== See also ==
- 2004 European Parliament election in Italy
