= Alliance of European National Movements =

Former far-right European political party

- President: Béla Kovács
- Founded: 24 October 2009; 17 years ago
- Dissolved: 2019
- Preceded by: Euronat
- Ideology: Ultranationalism; Euroscepticism; Russophilia; Anti-communism; Right-wing populism Neo-fascism
- Political position: Far-right
- European Parliament group: Non-Inscrits
- International affiliation: None

Website
- aemn.info (archived)

The Alliance of European National Movements (AENM) was a European political party that was formed in Budapest on 24 October 2009 by a number of ultranationalist and far-right parties from countries in Europe.

AENM's founding members were Jobbik (the alliance was established during their sixth party congress), France's National Front, Italy's Tricolour Flame, Sweden's National Democrats and Belgium's National Front.

At the end of 2011, the French National Front withdrew from AENM and joined the European Alliance for Freedom (EAF).

In 2014, the All-Ukrainian Union "Freedom" terminated its observer status in the AENM, due to many members of the bloc showing support for Russia in the Russo-Ukrainian war.

In February 2016, Jobbik cut all of its affiliation with AENM, and the president of AENM Béla Kovács left Jobbik.

== History ==
In November 2009, the British National Party claimed that AENM had been extended to nine parties, but this information was not confirmed by AENM President Bruno Gollnisch in 2012.

At a press conference held in Strasbourg on 16 June 2010, the political leadership of AENM was confirmed as follows: President Bruno Gollnisch, Vice President Nick Griffin, Treasurer Béla Kovács and Secretary General Valerio Cignetti.

At the end of 2011 the National Front withdrew from AENM and joined the European Alliance for Freedom. However, Gollnisch and Jean-Marie Le Pen maintained their position in the organisation.

In October 2013, Marine Le Pen requested that Gollnisch and Jean-Marie Le Pen leave their positions in the AENM in order to join the more moderate EAF and so unify the French National Front under the EAF banner. Marine Le Pen has tried to "de-demonize" the party, i.e. to give it a more acceptable image. Cooperation with the openly racist and antisemitic parties present in AENM was seen as contradictory to these aims. On November 7, the two declared they have followed the request and left AENM. This also meant the end of Gollnisch's term as the AENM's chairman, a place occupied by Béla Kovács since January 2014.

In the spring of 2013, Svoboda lost its observer status after a conflict with other member groups over its policies towards ethnic minorities in the West of Ukraine. However, Svoboda maintained its informal affiliation with the group until March 2014, when it announced its withdrawal of its observer status from AENM citing several members of the alliance making "statements supporting the Russian sponsored separatist forces and support for the Russian Armed Forces occupation of Ukrainian territory". Béla Kovács, leader of the alliance, had served as an observer at the 2014 Donbass parliamentary election.

In 2014, there were accusations against Chairman Kovács that he or his wife were working for the Russian intelligence service. In 2015 the European Parliament lifted Kovács immunity. In September 2020, he was cleared of the charge of espionage. However, he had worked with the Russian secret service SVR RF, but mostly in the form of influencing, with the aim to promote Russian interests through the AEMN. Kovács was sentenced to one and a half years imprisonment for fraud and falsification of documents to the detriment of the European Parliament.

The party did not apply for registration with the newly established Authority for European Political Parties and European Political Foundations (APPF), which was required from 2017, in good time. An application by the party foundation ITE was rejected by the APPF, as the AEMN was not registered itself at that time. Subsequently, the AEMN's application for funding for 2018 was rejected accordingly. Finally, the AEMN was registered as a European political party on 12 January 2018. At the end of 2018, the AENM was removed from the register again. The background was a change in the registration rules, according to which European parties had to submit member parties (with parliamentarians) from seven EU member states in the register. This put an end to the previous practice of AENM registering individual parliamentarians from national parties who did not belong to AENM but to other European parties. For example, parliamentarians from the Front National had regularly provided signatures for the AENM, the APF and the MENL – to which the FN belongs.

For the 2019 European Parliament election, AEMN chairman Kovacs provided the necessary signature of support for the candidacy of the Italian party CasaPound Italia. None of the parties in the AEMN's environment was able to win mandates in the election. After the election, the party was no longer active. For the 2024 European Parliament election in Italy, Royal Italy submitted a symbol with the text "Alleanza europea dei movimenti nazionali" at the top. In 2022, Royal Italy ran with United Right who made a deal with CasaPound in 2019.

== Members ==
Member parties of the AENM were:

Country	Party	Abbr.	Notes
Bulgaria	National Democratic Party; Национална демократическа партия	NDP	
Italy	Tricolour Flame; Fiamma Tricolore	FT	
Italy	United Right; Destre Unite	DU	
Portugal	Rise Up; Ergue-te	E	The party was extinct in June 2025
Slovenia	Slovenian National Party; Slovenska nacionalna stranka	SNS	
United Kingdom	British National Party	BNP	
Hungary	Jobbik	Jobbik	In 2016, it has cut all its affiliation with AENM
Spain	Republican Social Movement	MSR	On 30 January 2018, the party dissolved
France	National Front	FN	In 2011, it left to form the European Alliance for Freedom
Sweden	National Democrats	ND	In April 2014, the party dissolved
Finland	Blue and White Front	SVR	Party has been inactive since 2015

== Party structure ==
=== President ===
As of 2019

- Béla Kovács (formerly Jobbik, Hungary)

=== Board members ===
As of 2019

- Valerio Cignetti (FT, Italy)
- Zmago Jelinčič Plemeniti (SNS, Slovenia)

== See also ==
- Europe of Sovereign Nations Group (2024–present)
- Alliance for Peace and Freedom (2015–present)
- Euronat (1997–2009)
- European Alliance for Freedom
- European political party
- Authority for European Political Parties and European Political Foundations
- European political foundation
