= List of mayors of Lecce =

Mayor of Lecce
- Sindaco di Lecce

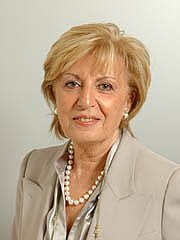
- Incumbent; Adriana Poli Bortone since 27 June 2024
- Appointer: Popular election
- Term length: 5 years, renewable once
- Formation: July 1861
- Website: Official website

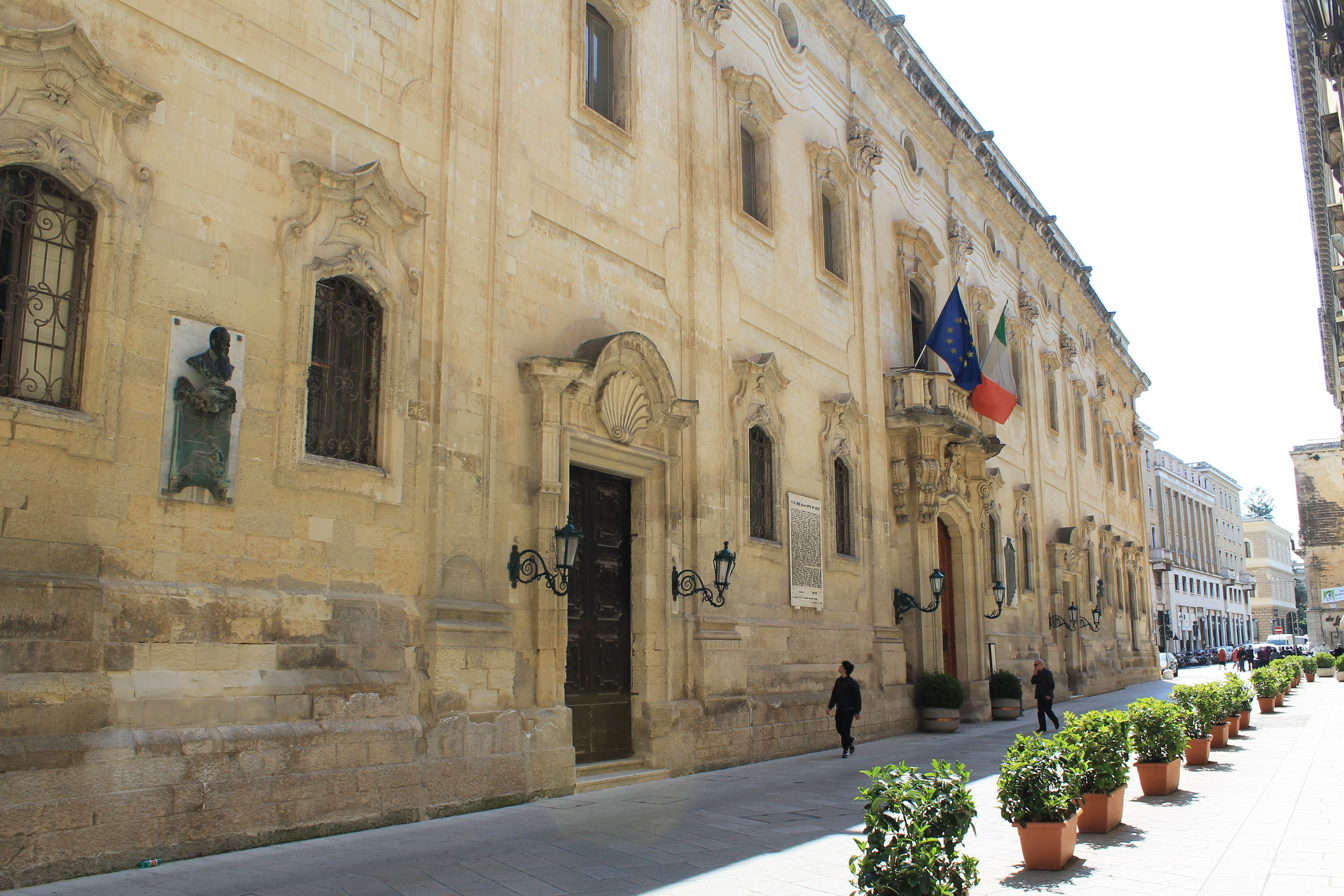
Palazzo Carafa is the seat of Mayor of Lecce.

The mayor of Lecce is an elected politician who, along with the Lecce's city council, is accountable for the strategic government of Lecce in Apulia, Italy.

The current mayor is Adriana Poli Bortone, elected on 23–24 June 2024.

== Overview ==
According to the Italian Constitution, the mayor of Lecce is member of the city council.

The mayor is elected by the population of Lecce, who also elects the members of the city council, controlling the mayor's policy guidelines and is able to enforce his resignation by a motion of no confidence. The mayor is entitled to appoint and release the members of his government.

Since 1995 the mayor is elected directly by Lecce's electorate: in all mayoral elections in Italy in cities with a population higher than 15,000 the voters express a direct choice for the mayor or an indirect choice voting for the party of the candidate's coalition. If no candidate receives at least 50% of votes, the top two candidates go to a second round after two weeks. The election of the City Council is based on a direct choice for the candidate with a preference vote: the candidate with the majority of the preferences is elected. The number of the seats for each party is determined proportionally.

== Republic of Italy (since 1946) ==
=== City Council election (1946-1995) ===
From 1946 to 1995, the Mayor of Lecce was elected by the City Council.

	Mayor	Term start	Term end	Party
1	Nicola Nacucchi	23 April 1946	12 March 1948	UQ
2	Gabriele Martirano	12 March 1948	30 June 1951	PNM
3	Oronzo Massari	30 June 1951	14 April 1958	PNM
(1)	Nicola Nacucchi	17 June 1958	8 November 1960	PNM
4	Alessandro Agrimi	13 December 1960	21 March 1963	DC
5	Francesco Sellitto	2 May 1963	25 August 1967	DC
6	Pietro Lecciso	25 August 1967	9 July 1969	DC
7	Salvatore Capilungo	9 July 1969	28 June 1977	DC
8	Salvatore Meleleo	3 July 1977	10 May 1983	DC
9	Ettore Giardiniero	10 May 1983	13 September 1985	DC
(8)	Salvatore Meleleo	13 September 1985	24 January 1986	DC
10	Augusto Melica	24 January 1986	10 October 1988	DC
11	Francesco Corvaglia	10 October 1988	22 November 1993	DC
12	Ottorino Fiore	22 November 1993	4 November 1994	DC
(11)	Francesco Corvaglia	4 November 1994	8 May 1995	PPI

=== Direct election (since 1995) ===
Since 1995, under provisions of new local administration law, the Mayor of Lecce is chosen by direct election, originally every four and since 2002 every five years.

	Mayor	Term start	Term end	Party	Coalition	Election
13	Stefano Salvemini (1928–2003)	8 May 1995	15 November 1997 (Note: Ousted out of office after losing the majority in the City Council.)	PDS	The Olive Tree (PDS-PPI-PdD-FdV-PRC)	1995
Special Prefectural Commissioner tenure (15 November 1997 – 25 May 1998)
14	Adriana Poli Bortone (b. 1943)	25 May 1998	28 May 2002	AN	Pole for Freedoms (FI-AN-CCD)	1998
14	Adriana Poli Bortone (b. 1943)	28 May 2002	28 May 2007	AN	House of Freedoms (FI-AN-UDC)	2002
15	Paolo Perrone (b. 1967)	28 May 2007	7 May 2012	PdL; FI	House of Freedoms (FI-AN-UDC)	2007
15	Paolo Perrone (b. 1967)	7 May 2012	30 June 2017	PdL; FI	PdL and right-wing lists	2012
16	Carlo Salvemini (b. 1966)	30 June 2017	11 January 2019 (Note: Ousted out of office after losing the majority in the City Council.)	Ind	PD and left-wing lists	2017
Special Prefectural Commissioner tenure (11 January 2019 – 28 May 2019)
(16)	Carlo Salvemini (b. 1966)	28 May 2019	27 June 2024	Ind	PD and left-wing lists	2019
(14)	Adriana Poli Bortone (b. 1943)	27 June 2024	Incumbent	FdI	FdI • FI • Lega • UDC and right-wing lists	2024
