= Nation (political party) =

Belgian political party

- President: Lucien Coppens
- Founder: Hervé Van Laethem
- Founded: 9 August 1999; 26 years ago
- Newspaper: NATION-Info
- Youth wing: Young NATION
- Ideology: Identitarianism; Solidarism; Anti-immigration; Anti-Islam; Revolutionary nationalism; Third Position
- Political position: Far-right
- European affiliation: Alliance for Peace and Freedom
- International affiliation: World National-Conservative Movement (2015); International Sovereigntist League (since 2025)
- Colours: Red; Black
- Chamber of Representatives (French-speaking seats): 0 / 61
- European Parliament (French-speaking seats): 0 / 8

Party flag

Website
- https://www.nation.be

The NATION Movement (or NATION), is a Belgian far-right political party founded on 9 August 1999, by nationalist politician Hervé Van Laethem in Belgium. The party is part of the larger far-right and right-wing populist movement in Belgium and has also been involved in the Yellow vests movement.

NATION maintains a YouTube channel, Télé NATION Info, where they broadcast rallies, protests, interviews and other content relating to the party.

Nation anti-immigrant rally, 2017

== History ==
On 9 August 1999 Van Laethem, along with two other individuals, formed the non-profit association Mouvement pour la Nation. The aim of this was, the dissemination and defence of nationalist ideas. The association developed into a political party, and in a general meeting on 28 September 2008 it was decided to dissolve the association with NATION only existing as a fully fledged party.

In 2015 the party was a founding member of the far-right Alliance for Peace and Freedom European political party. The group, which also includes the Italian New Force and National Democratic Party of Germany, wishes to organise nationalist parties across the continent that are staunchly opposed to the European Union.

On 12 January 2019 the far-right New Alternative Wallonia (NAW) party merged with NATION. NAW President Salvatore Russo was made Vice President of NATION.

== Protests and actions ==
When it was announced that Michelle Martin, accomplice of her husband's crimes of child molestation and murder, would be released from prison before her sentence was completed NATION took part in the numerous protests. Television station, RTL-TVI, reported that members of NATION had been visiting Halal shops wearing pig masks, however it was never confirmed that they were members of NATION.

It has been reported that Molenbeek-Saint-Jean is a safe haven for jihadists in relation to the support shown by some residents towards bombers who carried out the Paris and Brussels attacks. In response to this NATION organised a protest against then Socialist mayor, Philippe Moureaux. The party claims that Moureaux's due to his views and policies was responsible for a wave of terror attacks. Members of the party dumped manure outside of Moureaux's home.

NATION was involved in controversy when on 23 July 2016 members of the party burned the flag of the Islamic State at a medieval festival being held in the Bouillon Castle.

== Belgian Yellow Vest Movement ==
Since the Yellow vests movement began in 2019 NATION have organised and partaken in similar Belgian based protests. In 2019, the president of the movement, Hervé Van Laethem, registered the trademark Yellow Vests from the Office of Benelux for Intellectual Property, justifying himself by saying it was in order to "prevent the term 'Yellow Vests' from being used any which way by anyone, especially in the context of the elections". NATION claims to be fully committed to supporting the Yellow Vest movement and blames liberal capitalism and Marxist socialism for causing civil unrest and societal issues.

== Ideology ==
The party advocates: solidarism, the rejection of Islam, the opposition to immigration, and the defense of "European identity and civilization as well as its millennial culture by advocating "remigration". Through the party's official newspaper, NATION-Info, the party has supported revolutionary nationalism.

== Electoral results ==
=== Chamber of Representatives ===
Election year	# of overall votes	% of overall vote	# of overall seats won	# of language group seats won	+/–	Notes
2014	10,216	0.15	0 / 150	0 / 62	0	in opposition
2019	10,583	0.16	0 / 150	0 / 62	0	in opposition

=== Walloon Parliament ===
Election year	# of overall votes	% of overall vote	# of overall seats won	+/–	Notes
2014	10,839	0.53	0 / 75	0	in opposition
2019	9,649	0.47	0 / 75	0	in opposition

=== Brussels Parliament ===
Election year	# of overall votes	% of overall vote	# of overall seats won	+/–	Notes
2014	1,360	0.33	0 / 89	0	in opposition
