= Marcello Vernola =

Italian politician

Marcello Vernola (born 4 March 1961 in Bari) is an Italian politician who was a Member of the European Parliament between 2004 and 2009 for one of the Southern seats. He was a member of Forza Italia, part of the European People's Party and sat on the European Parliament's Committee on the Environment, Public Health and Food Safety.

He was a substitute for the Committee on Foreign Affairs, substitute for the Delegation to the EU-Romania Joint Parliamentary Committee.

== Education ==
- 1986: Graduate in law
- lawyer dealing with administrative cases
- 2004: defence counsel at the Court of Cassation
- 2003: Professor under contract to the University of Bari - School of Specialisation in European Community law
- Professor under contract to the University of Cassino - Faculty of Law - lecturing on 'public services'

== Career ==
- 1990-1995: Municipal Councillor of Bari
- 1996-1991: Member of the National Executive of the DC Youth Movement
- 1998-2000: Member of the PPI National Council
- 1999-2004: President of the Province of Bari
- 1999-2004: Chairman of the Union of Apulian Provincial Councils
- 2002-2003: Member of the consultative body for local authorities and for the Mezzogiorno of the 'Margherita' party

== See also ==
- 2004 European Parliament election in Italy
