= Pietro Mezzapesa =

Italian politician (1930–2008)

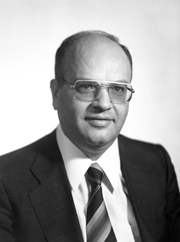

Member of the Senate of the Republic
- In office 5 July 1976 – 22 April 1992

President of the Province of Bari
- In office 20 November 1975 – 17 October 1976
- Preceded by: Giovanni Palumbo
- Succeeded by: Gianvito Mastroleo

Personal details
- Born: 19 February 1930 Putignano, Province of Bari, Kingdom of Italy
- Died: 9 June 2008 (aged 78) Ischia, Campania, Italy
- Party: Christian Democracy
- Profession: Teacher

Pietro Mezzapesa (19 February 1930 – 9 June 2008) was an Italian politician and cultural promoter. A member of Christian Democracy, he served as a member of the Senate for four consecutive legislatures, from 1976 to 1992, representing the Monopoli constituency. He also served as president of the Province of Bari from 1975 to 1976.
