= Francesco Schittulli =

Italian surgeon and politician

President of the Province of Bari
- In office 8 June 2009 – 9 June 2014
- Preceded by: Vincenzo Divella
- Succeeded by: Antonio Decaro

Personal details
- Born: 21 April 1946 (age 80) Gravina in Puglia, Italy
- Party: Schittulli Political Movement
- Profession: Surgeon, politician

Francesco Schittulli (born 21 April 1946 in Gravina in Puglia) is an Italian surgeon and politician.

Since 2000 is the President of the Lega Italiana per la Lotta ai Tumori (Italian League Against Cancer).

== Biography ==
Francesco Schittulli was the son of Angelo Schittulli, regional secretary of Christian Democracy in Apulia in the 80s and 90s. He graduated with honors in Medicine and Surgery and specialized in general surgery and oncology. Since 1993, the year of its establishment, he has been a member of the National Oncology Commission of the Ministry of Health. He was also the scientific director of the Oncological Institute of Bari from 1993 until 1997.

Elected several times councilor to the Order of Doctors of Bari, Schittulli was also a national councilor of the Italian Society of Surgical Oncology and director of the Special School of Surgical Breast of Italian Hospital Surgeons Association. Furthermore, he has been a lecturer at the Faculty of Medicine of the University of Foggia and then at the Graduate School of Oncology of the University of Bari and of the University of Rome Tor Vergata.

On 7 June 2009 Schittulli, supported by the centre-right coalition, was elected President of the Province of Bari with 50.05% of the vote. On 31 October 2011 he resigned from his position, however, after 18 days he withdrew his resignation for the newfound cohesion of the coalition.

Schittulli was candidate for president in the 2015 Apulian regional election, but after the political breaking between Raffaele Fitto and Silvio Berlusconi he was supported by only a part of the centre-right coalition (Schittulli Political Movement−Popular Area, Over with Fitto and Brothers of Italy), while Forza Italia supported the candidacy of Adriana Poli Bortone. Finally, Schittulli finished third, obtaining 18.29% of the vote, behind Michele Emiliano (PD) and Antonella Laricchia (M5S), but surpassing the other centre-right candidate, Adriana Poli Bortone.
