= Massimo Morsello =

Italian musician (1958–2001)

- Born: 10 November 1958; Rome (Italy)
- Died: 10 March 2001 (aged 42); London (United Kingdom)
- Height: 1.66 m (5 ft 5 in)

Massimo Morsello (10 November 1958 – 10 March 2001) was an Italian neo-fascist and singer-songwriter. In 1997, he co-founded the fascist political party Forza Nuova along with Italian politician Roberto Fiore. Morsello has been described as a leading figure of fascist political music in Italy.

== Biography ==
Massimo Morsello was born in Rome to a middle-class family. His mother was Bulgarian, and fled to Italy after the 1944 Bulgarian coup d'état and the rise of the Bulgarian Communist Party to power. He described his father as "deeply anti-communist", and an admirer of the social philosophy of fascism.

In 1975, at the age of 16, Morsello joined the Movimento Sociale Italiano, a neo-fascist Italian political party. He became a member of Fronte della Gioventù, the party's youth wing, and later joined Fronte Universitario d'Azione Nazionale (FUAN), an organization of right-wing university students, despite not attending a university. FUAN was largely independent of parliamentary politics, and primarily served as an Italian far-right think-tank in the late 1970s. During the Years of Lead, Morsello was involved in various episodes of violent protest, and may have become a member of the neo-fascist terrorist organization Nuclei Armati Rivoluzionari. He was ultimately sentenced to nine years and 6 months in prison for crimes related to terrorism.

During these years, Morsello began his career as a musician. He gave his first performance at the inaugural Hobbit Camp, a youth festival held by the Italian Social Movement in 1977. Morsello subsequently earned the nickname Massimino among the far-right members of Italian society.

Following the Bologna massacre on August 2, 1980, Massimo Morsello was accused of subversive association along with Roberto Fiore, the leader of Terza Posizione, and seven other defendants. The following month, Morsello and Fiore fled Italy, initially traveling to Germany before settling in London. Italy called for their extradition, but the petition was denied by England because the crimes they were accused of were only political. Morsello and Fiore were tried in Italy in absentia, and while both were acquitted of involvement in the Bologna bombings, Fiore received a five-year jail sentence for subversive association. It has been rumoured that Morsello and Fiore escaped extradition by collaborating with the MI6.

Upon arriving in London, Morsello and Fiore initially survived by taking temporary work in restaurants. By 1986, they had developed connections with several far-right politicians in England, including National Front member Nick Griffin, and used them to found the business company Meeting Point. Operating as a real estate business, Meeting Point provided jobs, lodging and accommodation to young students and workers living in London. Morsello and Fiore earned roughly €15 million from the venture, which was described as a "Rachmanite housing scam" in a 1994 motion to the British Parliament. The company has also faced allegations of operating as a fundraising tool for various far-right organizations in Italy.

While in London, Morsello continued his musical activities. He performed in a concert titled Scusate, ma non-posso venire that was broadcast in Italy via satellite on 22 July 1996. During the second half of the 1990s, Morsello was diagnosed with cancer. He underwent a disproven somatostatin therapy created by Italian doctor Luigi di Bella, with no success. In April 1999, Morsello was able to return to Italy, avoiding incarceration due to his worsening health condition. He continued to play music in public venues and helped Fiore found Forza Nuova shortly before his death in 2001.

== Music ==
Morsello's music is characterized by the insertion of far-right political themes into traditional acoustic and folk guitar-based songwriting; this is in contrast to other Italian right-wing musicians, who cite Celtic music and new punk as influences. Morsello has cited Italian singer and songwriter Francesco De Gregori as his chief influence. His later works saw attempts to develop a more personal style influenced by psychedelia, especially in songs like Otto di Settembre and Vandea. Morsello's lyrics focus on themes like revolution, nationalism, Fascism, abortion and Euroscepticism, all from a far-right point of view.

Morsello's songs have been compared to those of Italian political left-wing songwriters such as Francesco Guccini and Claudio Lolli. His right-wing political leanings, as expressed in his songs, have won the praise of far-right supporters, but hindered his acceptance by the mainstream public. Morsello's first three albums were released as demo tapes, and later re-mastered for sale via compact disc. He is considered among the best-selling far-right songwriters in Italy, selling 15,000 copies of his record Punto di non-ritorno.

Morsello took advantage of his low mainstream profile to play a prank on the Italian communist newspaper Il Manifesto. In 1998, he published a half-page paid advertisement of his record La direzione del vento in the newspaper's monthly review, declaring it "a truly revolutionary record". Morsello also wrote a message emphasizing his friendly stance towards the Palestinians in order to gain the favor of the publication's left-wing founders. The following day, the newspaper apologized and donated the proceeds from the advertisement to charity after learning or Morsello's identity.

=== Discography ===
- Per me… e la mia gente (1978), first released as a demo tape
- I nostri canti assassini (1981), first released as a demo tape
- Intolleranza (1990), first released as a demo tape
- Punto di non-ritorno (1996)
- Massimino, a 1997 compilation featuring his first two demo tapes
- La direzione del vento (1998)
