= Party of the Swedes =

Party of the Swedes Svenskarnas parti
- Abbreviation: SvP
- Leader: Daniel Höglund (2008–2013); Stefan Jacobsson (2013–2015)
- Founded: 22 November 2008
- Dissolved: 10 May 2015
- Preceded by: National Socialist Front
- Headquarters: Stockholm
- Newspaper: Realisten
- Ideology: Neo-Nazism; Ultranationalism; Ethnic nationalism Anti-immigration
- Political position: Far-right
- European affiliation: Alliance for Peace and Freedom
- Colours: Yellow; Blue; Black

Party flag

Website
- www.svenskarnasparti.se (archived) www.folkfronten.nu (archived)

Party of the Swedes (Swedish: Svenskarnas parti, SvP) was a neo-Nazi political party in Sweden. The party described itself as nationalist and sought to limit Swedish citizenship only to individuals who belong to the "Western genetic and cultural legacy". From 2013 to 2015, the party leader was Stefan Jacobsson. The party dissolved on 10 May 2015 due to lack of members.

The Ægishjálmur rune was the official SVP symbol since it originated as Folkfronten ("the people's front"), a neo-Nazi party founded in 2008 by members of the National Socialist Front (NSF), the largest Swedish neo-Nazi party at the time. The current name was introduced in 2009 after socialist activists registered NSF's name with the Election Authority of Sweden, blocking its use.

The party's only electoral success was one municipal mandate in 2010 in the small community of Grästorp in Västra Götaland in western Sweden. The mandate was lost after it was revealed that their representative, Daniel Höglund, was not registered as a resident, which is a requirement for members of municipal councils in Sweden. In the 2014 general election the party polled 0.07% with 4,189 votes. The decision to disband came seven months later.

== History ==
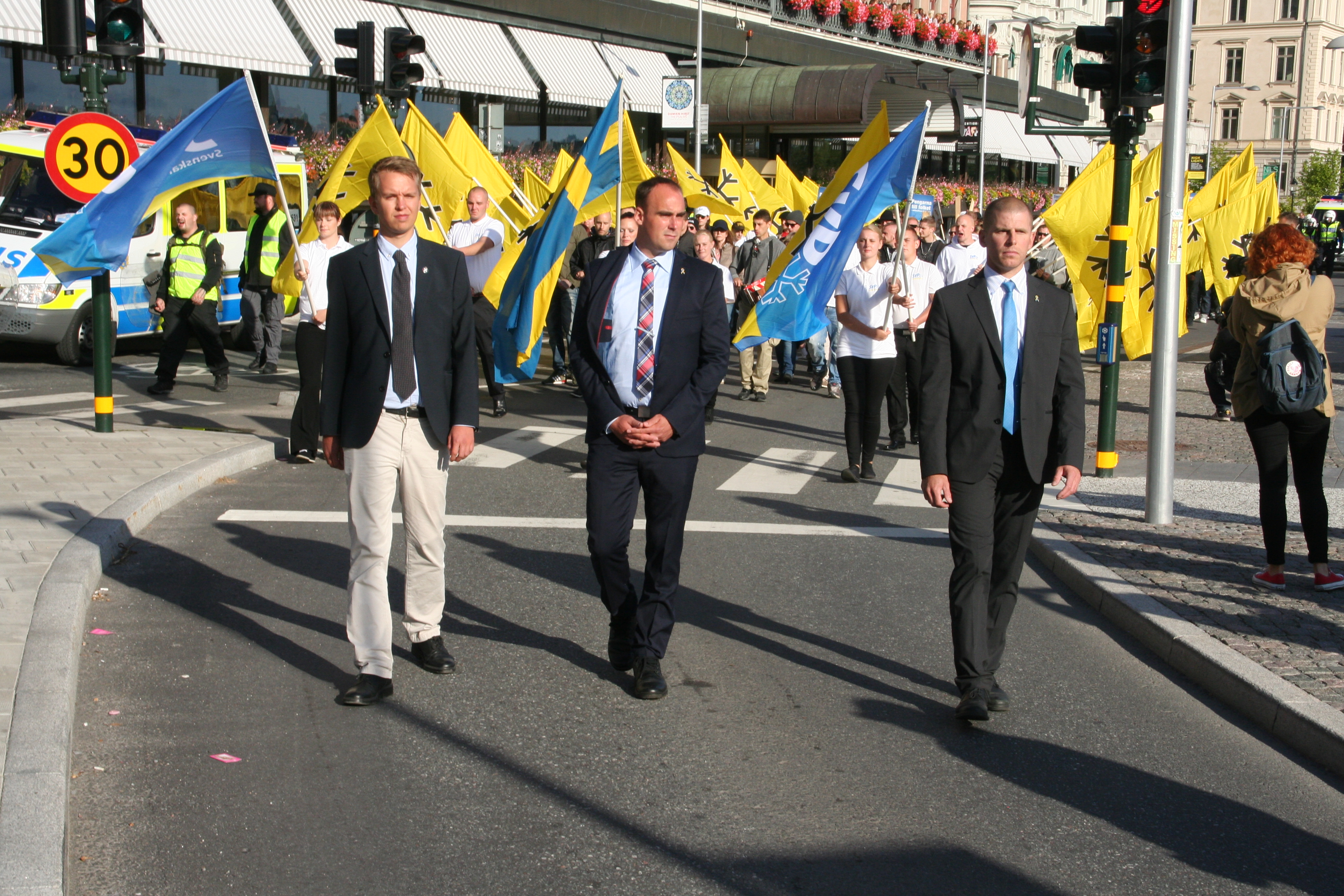
Party of the Swedes demonstrates in Stockholm

The party was founded as Folkfronten ("the people's front") in November 2008 by members of the defunct National Socialist Front. The name of the party was changed in 2009 to avoid confusion and loss of votes in the 2010 election. When the party filed an application to the Election Authority of Sweden, it became apparent that a newly established socialist group had been registered under the same name only weeks before to block its use.

In the 2010 elections, the party received 102 votes (2.8%) in the elections to municipal council in Grästorp, giving them one mandate. According to the anti-racist watchdog magazine Expo, this made them the first Neo-Nazi party to win a seat in a Swedish political assembly since the end of World War II. At the second council meeting after the election, the policy for public tenders was to be decided; the initial proposal gave preference to bidders with higher health and safety standards and lower environmental impact. Party of the Swedes representative Daniel Höglund managed to gather support for an additional sentence stating that Swedish labourers and companies should be given preference over foreign bidders, given the potential differences in travel distance. Other representatives later told reporters from the newspaper Expressen that this had appeared innocuous, but when later reflecting upon the consequences they recanted the decision and ensured that his suggestion would not have any influence on tenders.

A prerequisite for a mandate in Swedish municipal councils is residence in that municipality. After a few weeks and after the official records were reviewed, it was revealed that Höglund was registered as living in the neighbouring municipality and he was deprived of his seat.

Though it had received no votes at all, the party gained another seat in Nykvarn Municipality, when an independent member joined the Party of the Swedes. The councilman had been elected for the National Democrats, who received two members in the election of 2010. The party gained a third councilman in the Mönsterås municipal council when a former representative for the Sweden Democrats joined the party. Two Sweden Democrats defected to the party in Hedemora city council, though one of them soon left the Party of the Swedes as well, reducing the number of active representatives to three. The only elected seat, in Grästorp, remained unfilled. Following the general election in 2014, the party lost its only seat in the municipal council in Grästorp.

== Party leaders ==
- Daniel Höglund (2008–2013)
- Stefan Jacobsson (2013–2015)

== Electoral results ==
=== Parliament (Riksdag) ===
Election year	# of overall votes	% of overall vote	# of overall seats won	+/-	Notes
2010	681	0.01	0 / 349	New	Extra-parliamentary
2014	4,189	0.07	0 / 349	0	Extra-parliamentary

== See also ==
- National Democrats (2001–2014)
- Party of the Danes
