= Carlo Salvemini =

Italian politician

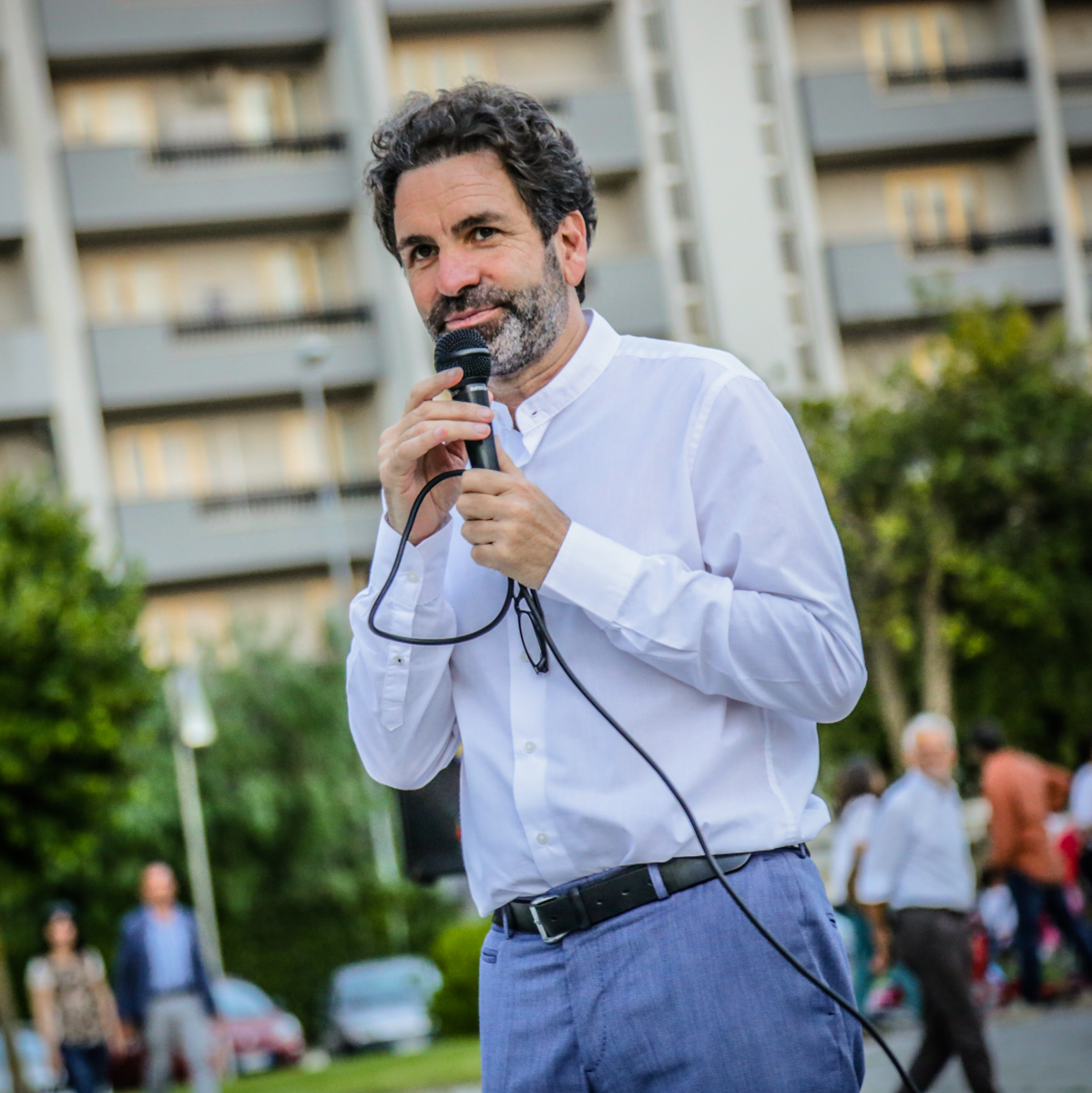

Mayor of Lecce
- In office 28 May 2019 – 27 June 2024
- Succeeded by: Adriana Poli Bortone
- In office 30 June 2017 – 11 January 2019
- Preceded by: Paolo Perrone

Personal details
- Born: 4 June 1966 (age 59) Lecce, Italy
- Party: Democratic Party
- Occupation: Accountant
- Website: carlosalvemini.it

Carlo Salvemini (born 4 June 1966) is an Italian politician, Mayor of Lecce from June 2017 to January 2019 and again from May 2019 to June 2024.

== Biography ==
He was born in Lecce, Apulia and is the son of the former mayor of Lecce Stefano Salvemini. He graduated in Economics and Commerce from the University of Bari in 1991 and obtained the qualification for the pursuit of doctoral student in 1992. In February 2017 he was accepted to become the candidate for mayor of Lecce after a public petition and a period of debates between the Democratic Party and the entire left-center Salento. Salvemini was elected Mayor of Lecce on 30 June 2017. However, it marked an anatra zoppa situation, as the lists supporting him only received 40.57% of the vote in the first round while the lists supporting center-right candidate Mauro Giliberti received 52.11% of the vote, thus he did not have the majority of city council on his side. Because of this, he resigned in January 2019 and was re-elected at the 2019 local elections in June, this time with a majority on the city council.

== See also ==
- 2017 Italian local elections
- 2019 Italian local elections
- List of mayors of Lecce

Political offices
Preceded by Paolo Perrone	Mayor of Lecce; 2017-2024	Succeeded by Adriana Poli Bortone
