= Conservatives and Reformists (Italy) =

Conservatives and Reformists Conservatori e Riformisti
- President: Raffaele Fitto
- Founded: May 2015 (launch); 3 June 2015 (foundation)
- Dissolved: 28 January 2017
- Split from: Forza Italia
- Succeeded by: Direction Italy
- Headquarters: Via Torre dell'Astrologo 44, Manfredonia
- Ideology: Conservatism; Liberal conservatism Liberalism; Soft euroscepticism
- Political position: Centre-right
- European affiliation: Alliance of Conservatives and Reformists in Europe
- European Parliament group: European Conservatives and Reformists
- Colours: Blue

Website
- conservatorieriformisti.it

The Conservatives and Reformists (Italian: Conservatori e Riformisti, CR or CoR) was a broadly conservative, and to some extent, Christian-democratic and liberal political party in Italy led by Raffaele Fitto. Since January 2017, the CoR was part of a new party named Direction Italy (DI), also led by Fitto. The CoR emerged in May 2015 from a split from Forza Italia (FI), and is modelled on the British Conservative Party and David Cameron's brand of liberal conservatism, vision, and leadership. In the run-up to the 2015 UK general election Fitto, Capezzone and other 28 MPs of their faction within FI had publicly endorsed Cameron in a letter to The Telegraph. The party is named after the European Conservatives and Reformists (ECR), the group in the European Parliament in which the Conservatives and Fitto sit. The CoR joined the Alliance of European Conservatives and Reformists (AECR) on 13 November 2015.

== History ==
=== Forza Italia's rebuilders ===
In November 2013, The People of Freedom, the centre-right party led by Silvio Berlusconi, was transformed into the new Forza Italia (FI), a reference to the original Forza Italia established in 1994. Among the strongest supporters of the return to FI, in contrast to the "hawks", as well as self-proclaimed "loyalists", was Raffaele Fitto, who played a leading role. At the 2014 European Parliament election, Fitto was FI's most voted candidate and was elected to the European Parliament in the South.

Fitto, the strongest backer of Berlusconi's leadership in late 2013, became his main internal challenger by mid 2014. After months of bickering with Berlusconi over the "Nazareno pact" with Matteo Renzi, leader of the Democratic Party and Prime Minister of Italy, Fitto launched his own faction, named "Rebuilders", in February 2015. Fitto's allies included Capezzone, Maurizio Bianconi, Rocco Palese, Saverio Romano, Cinzia Bonfrisco, Augusto Minzolini, and most Apulian MPs.

=== Split from Forza Italia ===
In the run-up of the 2015 regional elections Berlusconi and Fitto did not find an agreement on the composition of the slates in Apulia, where the party's two wings fielded two opposing candidates for president. At the 2015 Apulian regional election a list named after Fitto ("Beyond with Fitto") won 9.3% of the vote and its candidate for president, Francesco Schittulli (Schittulli Political Movement), won 18.3% of the president's vote (won by Michele Emiliano, a Democrat), compared to 10.8% for FI and 14.4% for FI's official candidate and former member of the Brothers of Italy (FdI), Adriana Poli Bortone.

Two weeks before the regional elections, Fitto left the European People's Party Group in the European Parliament in order to join the European Conservatives and Reformists (ECR). He also left FI altogether and launched the Conservatives and Reformists (CoR) party. At its launch, the CoR included nine deputies (eight sitting with FI and one with the FdI), as well as twelve senators (ten from FI and two from Great Autonomies and Freedom, GAL), organised in an official group; two senators later defected to the Liberal Popular Alliance (ALA), but the remaining ten senators were enough to keep the senatorial group alive. In early July the CoR were joined by an additional MEP, Remo Sernagiotto, who had defected from FI and the EPP to ECR. The CoR were established as a full-fledged political party on 16 July 2015.

=== European and Italian alliances ===
In November the CoR joined the Alliance of European Conservatives and Reformists (AECR), and started a sub-group within the Mixed Group in the Chamber of Deputies with eleven deputies, ten from FI and one from FdI. CR's deputies and senators may soon join forces with Gaetano Quagliariello's Identity and Action (split from the New Centre-Right), an earlier FI's spin-off, and Flavio Tosi's Act! (split from Lega Nord); such an alliance could boast more than 20 deputies and 15 senators.

In January 2016 another CoR senator switched to ALA, leaving the party with only nine senators. Being ten the minimum required number to form a group in the Senate, the party risked losing that privilege, but Luigi Compagna, a senator from Quagliariello's Identity and Action (IdeA) and the Great Autonomies and Freedom group, joined the CoR group in order to keep it alive, in a move that might be a prelude for a broader alliance between the two parties. In May history repeated itself: after one more senator had switched to ALA, another IdeA senator, Andrea Augello, joined forces with the CoR group in order to keep it alive. In the 2016 local elections the CoR ran its lists especially in Apulia: the party won 6.2% in Brindisi and had its candidate for mayor (Angela Carluccio) elected in the run-off, 7.2% in Fasano, 5.6% in Gallipoli, 13.2% in Nardò, 11.6% in Ruvo di Puglia, and 7.2% in San Giovanni Rotondo.

=== Dissolution into Direction Italy ===
In December 2016, Cinzia Bonfrisco left the party and joined the Italian Liberal Party (PLI), giving it representation in the Senate. In January 2017, Fitto launched a new party, named Direction Italy (DI), including the CoR and other minor parties. After the dissolution of the CoR group for lack of members, in May the seven senators of CR–DI joined the GAL group in May 2017, a group composed primarily of minor centre-right parties, while the CoR sub-group in the Chamber maintained its name for some time.

== Leadership ==
- President: Raffaele Fitto (2015–2017)
- Party Leader in the Chamber of Deputies: Rocco Palese (2015–2017)
- Party Leader in the Senate: Cinzia Bonfrisco (2015–2017)
- Party Leader in the European Parliament: Raffaele Fitto (2015–2017)
