= Party of the Danes =

Political party in Denmark from 2011 to 2017

Party of the Danes Danskernes Parti
- Leader: Daniel Carlsen (Daniel Stokholm)
- Founded: 10 June 2011
- Dissolved: 24 June 2017
- Headquarters: Viborg
- Ideology: Ethnic nationalism Neo-Nazism
- Political position: Far-right
- European affiliation: Alliance for Peace and Freedom
- International affiliation: World National-Conservative Movement (2015)
- Colours: Black; Red; White

Website
- Danskernesparti.dk

The Party of the Danes (sometimes translated the Danes' Party) (Danish: Danskernes Parti) was a political party in Denmark. The party described itself as nationalist and ethnopluralist. Many experts and analysts have classified the Party of the Danes as a neo-Nazi party.

The Party of the Danes was founded by Daniel Carlsen and other former members of the National Socialist Movement of Denmark (DNSB) on 10 June 2011.

The party ran for municipal councils in 2013, but did not win any seats. In 2015 it started collecting signatures in order to get on the ballot for the next national election, and in April 2016 the party claimed to have collected half the necessary signatures. On 24 June 2017, the party announced that the parties founder and leader Daniel Carlsen had decided to retire from politics to concentrate on his family, and that the rest of the leadership therefore had decided to close the party.

== Municipal election results ==
Year	# of total votes	Vote %	Seats
2013	6,782	0.21	0

== See also ==
- Party of the Swedes
