= Giacinto Genco =

Italian politician (1901–1997)

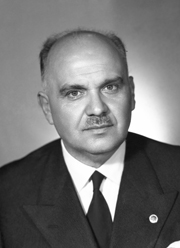

Member of the Senate of the Republic
- In office 8 May 1948 – 24 June 1953
- In office 12 June 1958 – 24 May 1972

President of the Province of Bari
- In office 1944–1947
- Preceded by: Tommaso Di Ciaula
- Succeeded by: Vittorio Lattanzio

Personal details
- Born: 28 October 1901 Altamura, Province of Bari, Kingdom of Italy
- Died: 14 October 1997 (aged 95) Montesilvano, Abruzzo, Italy
- Party: Christian Democracy
- Profession: Engineer, teacher

Giacinto Maria Genco (28 October 1901 – 14 October 1997) was an Italian engineer, teacher and politician. A member of Christian Democracy, he served as a member of the Senate of the Republic.
