= National Democratic Party (Bulgaria) =

Bulgarian political party

The National Democratic Party (Bulgarian: Българското национално-демократическа партия, romanized: Balgarskoto natsionalno-demokraticheska partiya) is a Bulgarian political party founded on March 25, 2012 from a split of Ataka.

The party has been led by Dimitar Stoyanov since June 2012.

== Electoral results ==
Until June 2014, it had an MEP, Dimitar Stoyanov, and is a member of the Alliance of European National Movements.
