= List of presidents of the Province of Bari =

President of the Province of Bari
- Presidente della Provincia di Bari
- Inaugural holder: Francesco Lattanzio
- Formation: 1889
- Final holder: Francesco Schittulli
- Abolished: 2014
- Superseded by: Metropolitan mayor of Bari

The president of the Province of Bari was the head of the provincial administration of Bari, a local government authority in Apulia, Italy.

== History ==
The office of president of the Province of Bari was established in 1889, initially within the Provincial Deputation. Before that date, the Deputation was headed by the prefect. During the Fascist period (1926–1945), the province was governed by appointed officials, including commissioners and presidents of the Rectorate. After World War II, the office was restored and gradually redefined within the Italian Republic, first with indirect election by the Provincial Council and, from 1995, with direct popular election.

The province was eventually replaced in 2015 by the Metropolitan City of Bari.

== List ==
=== Presidents of the Provincial Deputation (1889–1929) ===
No.	Portrait	Name	Term of office		Party
No.	Portrait	Name	Start	End	Party
1		Francesco Lattanzio	1889	1899	
2		Francesco Angiulli	1899	1908	
3		Giuseppe Mallardi	1908	?	

=== Presidents of the Provincial Rectorate (1929–1943) ===
No.	Portrait	Name	Term of office		Party
No.	Portrait	Name	Start	End	Party
1		Vincenzo Viterbo	1929	1934	National Fascist Party
2		Tommaso Di Ciaula	1934	1943	National Fascist Party

=== Presidents of the Provincial Deputation (1944–1951) ===
No.	Portrait	Name	Term of office		Party
No.	Portrait	Name	Start	End	Party
1		Giacinto Genco	1944	1947	Christian Democracy
2		Vito Lattanzio	1948	1951	Christian Democracy

=== Presidents of the Province (1951–2014) ===
No.	Portrait	Name	Term of office		Party
No.	Portrait	Name	Start	End	Party
		?	?	?	?
		Vitantonio Lozupone	12 December 1960	7 November 1962	Christian Democracy
		Matteo Fantasia	7 November 1962	1965	Christian Democracy
		Matteo Fantasia	1965	7 December 1970	Christian Democracy
		Giovanni Palumbo	7 December 1970	20 November 1975	Christian Democracy
		Pietro Mezzapesa	20 November 1975	17 October 1976	Christian Democracy
		Gianvito Mastroleo	17 October 1976	1980	Italian Socialist Party
		Gianvito Mastroleo	1980	16 April 1982	Italian Socialist Party
		Maria Miccolis	16 April 1982	29 October 1984	Christian Democracy
–		?	29 October 1984	4 October 1985	Prefectural commissioner
		Giuseppe Casone	4 October 1985	18 June 1987	Christian Democracy
		Giovanni Copertino	26 July 1987	10 August 1990	Christian Democracy
		Domenico Ricchiuti	10 August 1990	7 May 1995	Christian Democracy
		Francesco Sorrentino	7 May 1995	6 July 1999	Forza Italia
		Marcello Vernola	6 July 1999	12 June 2004	Italian People's Party
		Vincenzo Divella	12 June 2004	7 June 2009	Independent (centre-left)
		Francesco Schittulli	8 June 2009	9 June 2014	Independent (centre-right)

== See also ==
- Mayor of Bari
- Metropolitan City of Bari

== Sources ==
- "Storia amministrativa dell'ente". Ministero dell'Interno.
- Menichini, Piera (2005). "I presidenti delle Province dall'Unità alla Grande guerra: repertorio analitico". Storia Amministrazione Costituzione (13): 228–229.
