= Bruno Gollnisch =

French politician (born 1950)

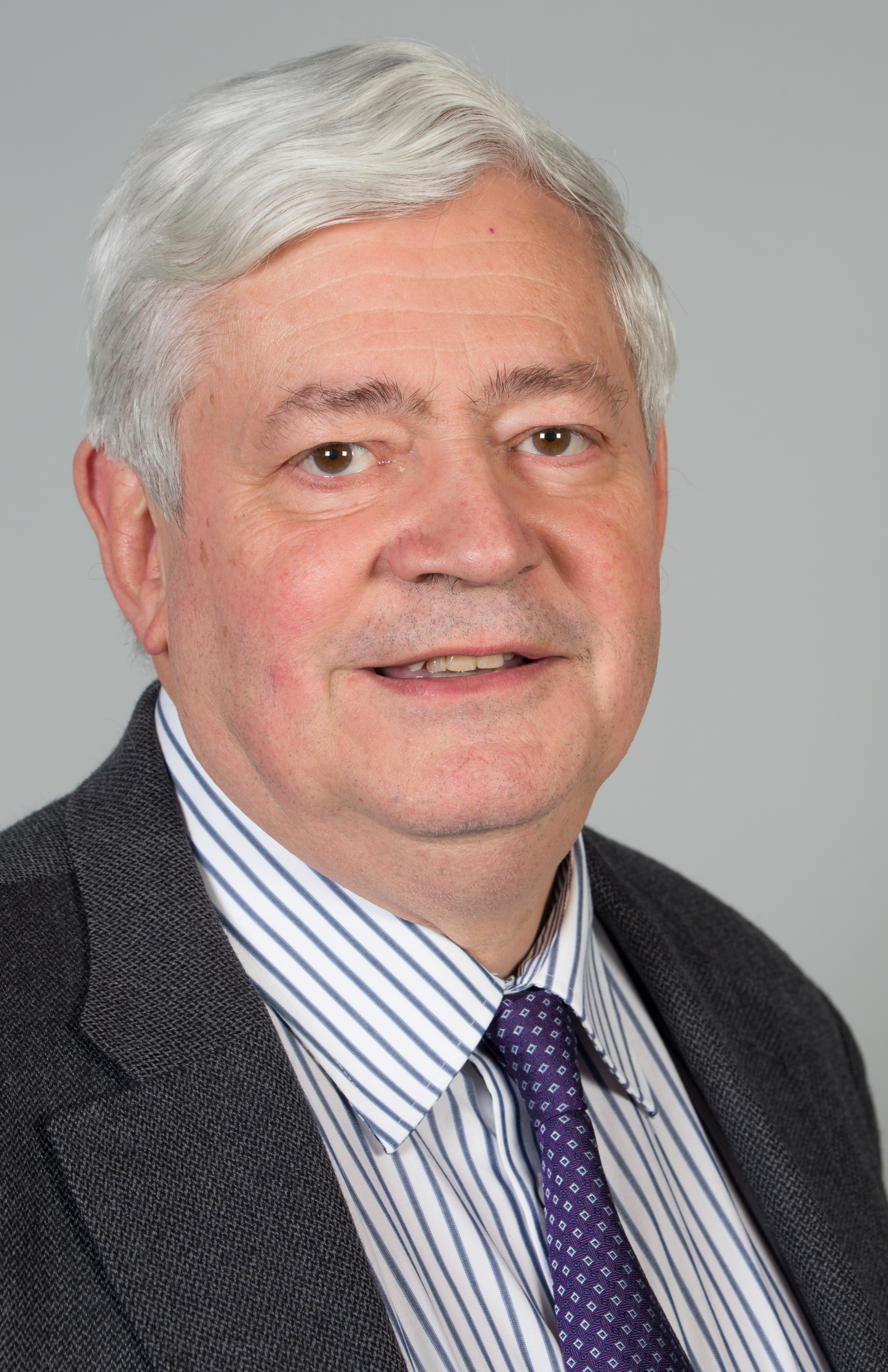
- Gollnisch in 2014

Member of the European Parliament
- In office 15 July 1989 – 1 July 2019
- Constituency: France (1989–2004); East France (2004–2014); South-East France (2014–2019)

Regional councillor for Rhône-Alpes
- In office 16 March 1986 – 31 January 2015

Member of the French National Assembly for Rhône (department)
- In office 16 March 1986 – 14 May 1988

Municipal councillor for the 8th arrondissement of Lyon
- In office 18 June 1995 – 30 March 2014

Personal details
- Born: 28 January 1950 (age 76) Neuilly-sur-Seine, France
- Party: National Rally
- Spouse: Setsuko Takeuchi
- Children: 3

Bruno Gollnisch (French pronunciation: [bʁyno ɡɔlniʃ]; born 28 January 1950) is a French academic and politician of the far-right National Rally (RN), formerly known as National Front. He was a member of the European Parliament and was chairman of the European Parliamentary group 'Identity, Tradition, Sovereignty' in 2007, which was dissolved in November 2007 following the defection of the Greater Romania Party. He was thereafter a Non-Inscrit (independent). Gollnisch has also been the executive vice-president of the FN from 2007 to 2011. He was also a councillor of the Rhône-Alpes région of France. Because of his public comments and his position in the National Front, he is a controversial political figure in France.

== Education ==
Gollnisch was born in Neuilly-sur-Seine. He studied law, political science and Far Eastern languages with the view to becoming a diplomat. He met Jean-Marie Le Pen while studying at Nanterre University. He also became a reserve officer in the French Navy.

In 1971–1973, he was granted degrees in Japanese and Malaysian-Indonesian by the INALCO. In 1973, he was awarded a degree in political sciences at Institut d'Etudes Politiques de Paris (Sciences Po). He did a master's (DEA) in public law in 1973. In 1974, he began doctoral studies in Law at Kyoto University (Japan). In 1978, he obtained a doctorate in law at Panthéon-Assas University. Since 1980, he has been an attorney at the bar of Paris.

== Academic career ==
After his return to France, he began a career as a juridical advisor, then a lawyer. He is a specialist in the law of Eastern Asian countries.

He became an associate professor of Law at Metz University. In 1981, he became professor of Japanese language and civilisation at the University of Lyon III. Gollnisch has collaborated with the white nationalist American Renaissance magazine.

Video Introduction (English) / (French)

== Political career ==
Gollnisch, who is part of the Catholic faction within the National Front, along with Bernard Antony, joined the "TSM" faction inside the FN (Tout sauf Mégret, Anybody But Mégret) during the 1990s crisis, along with Marine Le Pen, Roger Holeindre, Jean-Claude Martinez, Samuel Maréchal and Martine Lehideux.

Gollnisch served as the President of the Alliance of European National Movements (AENM) from 2010 until 2013, when his party left the AENM to join the more moderate European Alliance for Freedom (EAF) and so unify the National Front under the EAF banner.

Gollnisch was an unsuccessful candidate for the leadership of the National Front in 2011 when the party's founding leader, Jean Marie Le Pen, retired. Gollnisch was defeated by Marine Le Pen, Jean Marie's daughter.

== Controversies ==
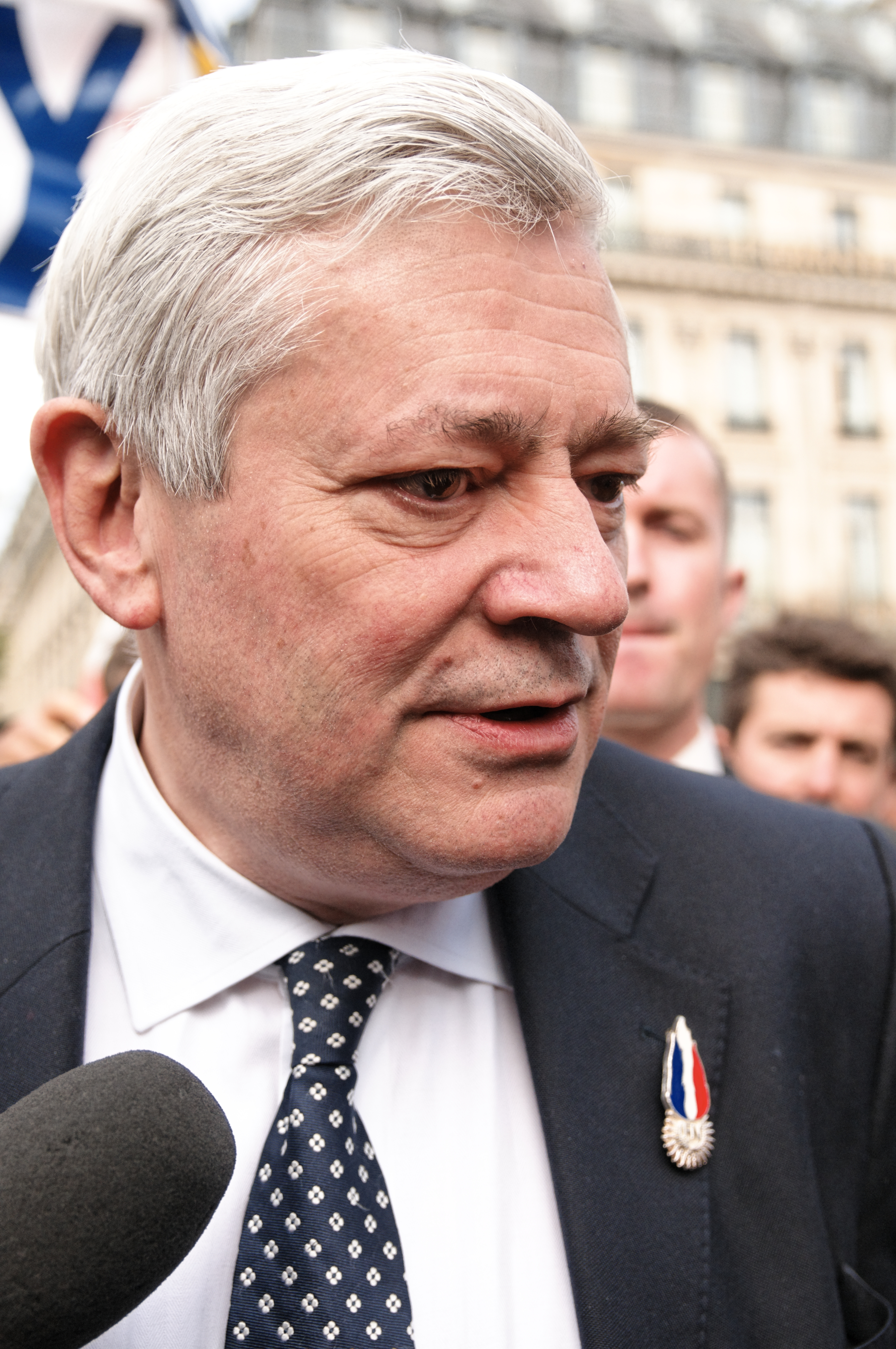
Gollnisch interviewed by a journalist at 1 May rally in honour of Joan of Arc, Paris.

=== Holocaust denial trial ===
Gollnisch was condemned in January 2007 to a three-month prison sentence on probation and ordered to pay costs of 55,000 Euros (with interest) by the Lyon tribunal correctionnel on a charge of "an offence of verbal contestation of the existence of crimes against humanity, " which is punished in France by virtue of the 1990 Gayssot Act. Gollnisch had committed the verbal contestation on 11 October 2004, by declaring:

I do not question the existence of concentration camps but historians could discuss the number of deaths. As to the existence of gas chambers, it is up to historians to speak their minds ("de se déterminer").

In reaction to a report denouncing the complacent attitude of the University Lyon III with respect to the far right, Gollnisch reiterated his declarations shortly after its publication. Gollnisch's declarations, with their implication of holocaust denial, provoked a scandal, especially in the run-up to the ceremonies commemorating the 60th anniversary of the liberation of the Auschwitz extermination camp. The chancellor of the university asked the Minister of National Education to suspend Professor Gollnisch and announced the opening of a disciplinary procedure against him.

On 26 December, the chancellor suspended Professor Gollnisch's classes for 30 days. Furthermore, on 2 December, the chancellor excluded him from the university, alleging a possible breach of the peace; however, this decision was overturned by the Conseil d'État on 14 January 2005.

On 2 February, Gollnisch started teaching again at Lyon III. Students were prevented from entering his lecture room by groups of students from left-wing and Jewish associations. A group of National Front students enabled his students to enter and blocked the protesters. A brawl ensued; police officers arrived on the scene, and a National Front student was arrested. Other trouble ensued.

On 7 November 2006, at the opening of the trial, Gollnisch was asked whether "the organised extermination of European Jews by the Nazi regime (...) constitutes an undeniable crime against humanity, and that it was carried out notably by using gas chambers in extermination camps". He replied "absolutely". Gollnisch was finally found not guilty by the Cour de cassation on 24 June 2009.

=== Links to other far-right parties ===
On 23 October 2012, Gollnisch visited Hungary to deliver a speech in honour of Jobbik, a party described as "anti-Semitic" by the New York Times and as "extremist" by Marine Le Pen. In the speech, Gollnisch declared that the Treaty of Trianon was "unjust and shameful." Condemnation of the Treaty of Trianon is seen by Romania as the endorsement of irredentist claims on Romanian territory and of the redrawing of the map of Europe.

== Criticism of the Vatican ==
In August 2010, Gollnisch – who supports the French Government's move to deport Roma from French territory – publicly criticised the Vatican for opposing the deportation. He suggested that the evicted Roma should be accommodated in St Peter's Square, Rome, and that the Vatican should then re-state its position.

== Personal life ==
He married Setsuko Takeuchi, from Japan, in 1981, and they have three children.

== Electoral mandates ==
- Member of European Parliament: Since 1989
- Member of the National Assembly of France for Rhône (departement): 1986–1988
- Regional councillor of Rhône-Alpes: Since 1986
- Municipal councillor of Lyon: 1995–2014

Party political offices
Preceded by New office	President of the Alliance of European National Movements; 2010–2013	Succeeded by Béla Kovács
