= Italy for the Italians =

Italy for the Italians Italia agli Italiani
- Leader: Roberto Fiore
- Founded: December 2017
- Dissolved: 2018
- Ideology: Neo-fascism; Ultranationalism; Hard Euroscepticism; Social conservatism Identitarianism; Third Position; Corporatism; Revolutionary nationalism
- Political position: Far-right
- Chamber of Deputies (Italy): 0 / 630
- Senate: 0 / 315
- European Parliament: 0 / 73

Website
- https://www.italiaagliitaliani.it

Italy for the Italians (Italian: Italia agli Italiani) was a coalition of far-right neo-fascist political parties in Italy. It was founded to participate in the 2018 general election by the neo-fascist, New Force and Tricolor Flame parties.

== Composition ==
Parties	Main ideology	Leaders
New Force (FN)	Neo-fascism	Roberto Fiore
Tricolour Flame (FT)	Neo-fascism	Attilio Carelli
Social Italy Movement (MIS)	Neo-fascism	Roberto Miranda
Fasci Italiani del Lavoro	Neo-fascism	Claudio Negrini
Southern Action League (LAM)	Regionalism	Giancarlo Cito

== Electoral results ==
=== Italian Parliament ===
Election	Leader	Chamber of Deputies				Senate of the Republic			
Election	Leader	Votes	%	Seats	Position	Votes	%	Seats	Position
2018	Roberto Fiore	126,207	0.38	0 / 630	15th	149,694	0.49	0 / 315	14th
