= Daniel Stokholm =

Danish former politician (born 1990)

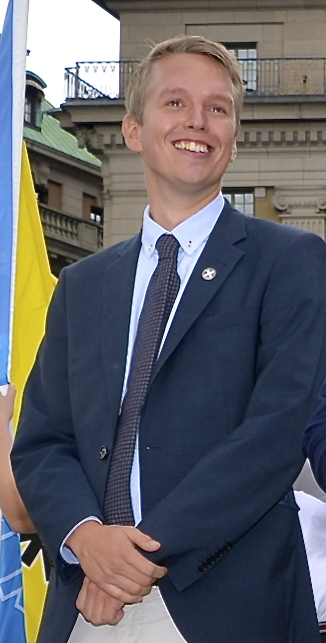
- Stokholm during a march with the Party of the Swedes in Stockholm in 2014

Personal details
- Born: Daniel Carlsen; 27 March 1990 (age 36) Denmark
- Party: Party of the Danes (until 2017)

Daniel Stokholm (born Daniel Carlsen on 27 March 1990), is a Danish former nationalist politician and former neo-Nazi.

Stokholm has been exposed in the media in 2008 and 2009, as chairman of the Party of the Danes, as he was previously a Nazi, according to his own statements.

He has been a member of the Danish National Socialist Movement (Danmarks Nationalsocialiste Bevægelse, DNSB) and was one of its front figures until February 2011 when he left the movement.

On 10 June 2011, Stokholm formed his own party, the Party of the Danes.

On 19 November 2013, he ran for election for the first time in connection with the municipal and regional council elections. In the Central Jutland Region, he received 1,087 votes, and in the local elections in Aarhus 391 votes. However, the number of votes obtained was not sufficient for representation in either the region or the municipality.

On 24 June 2017, Stokholm announced that he was withdrawing from politics, and therefore, his party was then abolished, as when For Freedom held its annual folk festival; but DP members had not been informed in advance and therefore first received the message through the press.

== Biography ==
Daniel Carlsen was born on 27 March 1990.

From the age of 17, Stokholm was a member of the Danish National Socialist Movement (DNSB) until February 2011, when he resigned, and later on 10 June the same year formed his own party: the Party of the Danes.

I was a member [of DNSB] from the time I was 18 until I was 21. I left that movement because I consider it more of a historical association than an actual political organization. When I joined the Nazi movement at all, it was because at that time I was dissatisfied with the Danish People's Party's lax foreign policy and wanted an alternative. At the time, DNSB was the only organization that did not talk about integration, but about repatriations. Had there been an alternative, I probably would have chosen differently. These are old quotes. When I joined DNSB, it was either or. You bought the whole package, or you did not. I do not deny the Holocaust today. I also feel it is natural to evolve over time. After all, there are many political people who have done this, and where it is not questioned. ...our current Prime Minister (Helle Thorning-Schmidt) is a former Communist. It does not take up much space in the debate. I'm just saying that there is a disproportionate mention of it [the Holocaust denial.] In relation to how much emphasis is placed on our party's political agenda today.

— Stokholm on 15 May 2015, in a portrait article in Berlingske

Stokholm has previously stated that he distances himself from violence as a political weapon, but he has both been arrested for assault and charged with violence against a doorman, street disorder and violent behavior as well as vandalism.

Stokholm has been featured in several Danish media and magazines, including B.T., Nyhedsavisen, MetroXpress, Avisen.dk and Søndagsavisen. He has been interviewed by DR Update, SKUM TV and regional TV stations, and his parents have been interviewed about his Nazi inclinations in DR's Evening Show.

On 29 May 2015, Finnish Yleisradio Oy was able to publish a list of 89 EU citizens who will be banned from entering Russia. Stokholm is one of the four Danes on the list, the other three are the former foreign ministers Per Stig Møller and Lene Espersen and the head of the Defense Intelligence Service, Thomas Ahrenkiel.

== Ideology ==
In the summer of 2011, Stokholm sued the newspaper Ekstra Bladet twice before the Press Board, as the newspaper, according to him, was not allowed to call him a Nazi. The Press Board rejected the cases with reference to Stokholm's past: "Complaints have previously been publicly mentioned as Nazi and pictured in front of swastika flags in articles in which he has participated. party as "Nazi" and "Nazi Party" respectively. "

In an article in Information from 5 April 2011, Daniel Stokholm stated that the Danes' Party is a modernization of DNSB:

"- Under Esben Rohde Kristensen, it's all crumbled completely, and then we want to step out of the shadow of the 30s. We want to modernize DNSB, so you can not say that it is a competing party, says Daniel Carlsen [Daniel Stokholm] and adds:

"I have not changed my political position in one night either."

On March 27, 2013, Daniel Stokholm's first book, "Odelsret til Danmark" was published. A National Conservative blogger has written in a review that he has read the book "with the aim of clarifying whether Daniel Carlsen [Daniel Stokholm] (and probably thus the Party of the Danes) can be said to be National Socialist, as the anti-fascist propaganda stubbornly tries to claim "and concludes that" Daniel Carlsen [Daniel Stokholm] today has more in common with the Anglo-Saxon Enoch Powell than with the Austrian Adolf Hitler".

On July 26, "Odelsret til Danmark" was reported by Kai Sørlander in Weekendavisen.

It is immediately clear that in today's political spectrum it is extreme. It is more critical of immigration than the Danish People's Party. But in the interest of truth, it should be noted that it is not Nazi. The right that Carlsen [Stokholm] gives to the Danish people, he gives to any people. For him, it is not a question of the Danes being superior to others or having the right to other people's land. But they have the right to their own country - the historically and geographically delimited Denmark. And he does not claim former Danish territories that we have lost in the course of history. In addition, he tries to present a repatriation policy that is as humane as possible, but which he finds necessary because he considers the immigration policy of recent decades to be irresponsible from Denmark's point of view.

— Sørlander emphasizing on that Stokholm's thoughts are not Nazi.

At the public meeting on Bornholm in 2015, Özlem Cekic participated in a debate on Danishness in the Party of the Danes' tent. In this connection, Stokholm stated: "It is not too funny that I want to send you home, Özlem. It is a necessity; I can not base my politics on your sweet, brown eyes."

=== Denial of the Holocaust ===
In several of Stokholm's previous statements, he denied anything in regards of the Holocaust.

People think hostile and hateful about National Socialism because the only thing they know about it is the story of the extermination of six million Jews - and I do not believe that interpretation of the Holocaust. I see Hitler as a great man who has founded what I believe in, but people have problems with him because of the propaganda of the Communists and Americans since World War II. It is a huge problem that people believe in democratic propaganda.

— Stokholm's statement to Urban on 16 May 2008

Of course, there were Jews who died because there was war. But I do not believe in the systematic eradication of the gas chambers.

— Stokholm's statement to Nyhedsavisen on 15 May 2018

In an interview with Anders Stegger leading up to the local elections in 2013, Stokholm stated: "I do not deny the Holocaust".
