= Paolo Perrone =

Italian politician

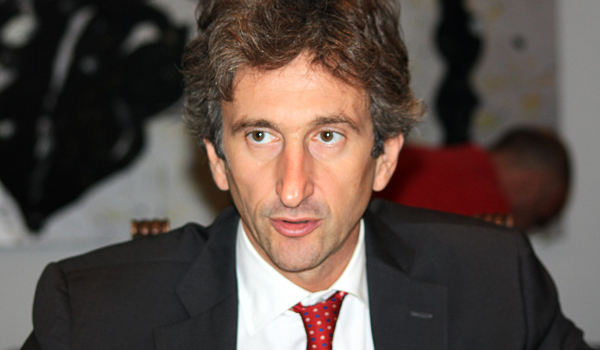

Mayor of Lecce
- In office 28 May 2007 – 30 June 2017
- Preceded by: Adriana Poli Bortone
- Succeeded by: Carlo Salvemini

Personal details
- Born: 16 December 1967 (age 58) Lecce, Apulia, Italy
- Party: Forza Italia; The People of Freedom; Forza Italia; Brothers of Italy
- Education: Bocconi University
- Profession: manager

Paolo Perrone (born 16 December 1967 in Lecce) is an Italian politician.

He ran with Forza Italia for the office of Mayor of Lecce at the 2007 mayoral elections, supported by a centre-right coalition. He was elected on 27 May 2007 and took office on 29 May. Perrone was elected for a second term at the 2012 elections.

In 2018 he joined the right-wing party Brothers of Italy.

== See also ==
- List of mayors of Lecce

Political offices
Preceded by Adriana Poli Bortone	Mayor of Lecce; 2007–2017	Succeeded by Carlo Salvemini
