= Béla Kovács (politician, 1960) =

Hungarian politician

Béla Kovács MEP

Member of the European Parliament
- In office 10 May 2010 – 1 July 2019
- Constituency: Hungary

Personal details
- Born: 25 February 1960 (age 66) Budapest, Hungary
- Party: Hungarian: Independent; EU: Non-Inscrits
- Other political affiliations: Jobbik (until 2016)
- Spouse: Svetlana Istoshina
- Children: 1
- Education: University of Budapest

Béla Gábor Kovács (born 25 February 1960) is a Hungarian former politician and Member of the European Parliament (MEP) from Hungary between 2010 and 2019. He is a former member of Jobbik, which he joined in 2003 and left in 2016.

He was elected President of the Alliance of European National Movements (AENM) on 17 December 2013, replacing Bruno Gollnisch.

The Hungarian government accused Kovács of engaging in espionage against European Union institutions for the Russian government. In September 2014, the Hungarian public prosecutor asked the European Parliament to suspend Kovács's MEP immunity so that he could be investigated. The European Parliament lifted the immunity on 14 October 2015.

In September 2022 the Curia of Hungary sentenced him in absentia to five years imprisonment for espionage. He lives and teaches in Russia.

Béla Kovács's Russian father served in the military and his son has been 'known to the KGB almost from the day he was born'. Kovacs grew up with foster parents and moved with them to Japan in 1976, where in 1979 he met his 7 years older Russian wife Svetlana Istoshina, who was in Japan due to an earlier marriage (1975) to a Japanese nuclear scientist who had worked in Russia and Kazakhstan, Omiya Massanori. Kovacs married Istoshina in 1986. Istoshina was also briefly married to an Austrian man, convicted criminal Mario Schön, in 1983, four years after meeting Kovacs, and holds Austrian citizenship.

Kovacs lived in Russia from 1988 to 2003 and claims to have worked in the "leadership of various trading companies" during this time. Journalists have however found no traces of Kovacs or his wife in registers of Russian companies, or articles in Russian newspapers about Kovacs's supposed business career He has also studied international relations at MGIMO university in Moscow.

Party political offices
| Preceded by Bruno Gollnisch | President of the Alliance of European National Movements; 2013– | Succeeded by Incumbent |
