= I the South =

Former political party in Italy, now faction of political party Brothers of Italy

I the South Io Sud
- President: Adriana Poli Bortone
- Founded: 14 February 2009
- Split from: National Alliance
- Headquarters: via S. Lazzaro, 3 Lecce, Apulia
- Ideology: Regionalism; Conservatism
- Political position: Right-wing
- National affiliation: Great South (2012-2013); Brothers of Italy (2014-2015); Forza Italia (2016-2019); Tricolour Flame (2019-2022); Italexit (since 2022)

Website
- http://www.iosud.it/

I the South (Io Sud, IS), was a conservative regionalist political party in Italy, which has been a faction of Brothers of Italy since 2014.

The party emerged in 2009 as an Apulian split from National Alliance (AN) led by Adriana Poli Bortone, shortly before AN was merged into The People of Freedom (PdL). Soon after the party approached to the Union of the Centre (UdC) in order to form a centrist party as an alternative to the PdL, and in this perspective Poli Bortone joined UdC in a common group in the Senate.

At the 2009 provincial elections the party won 7.3% in Lecce (while Poli Bortone won 21.9% as candidate for President supported also by the UdC), 3.4% in Taranto and 2.0% in Brindisi. In the 2010 Apulian regional election Poli Bortone ran for President supported also by the regional section of the Union of the Centre, that is the main component of UdC. Poli Bortone gained 8.7% of the vote, while IS gained a mere 2.9%.

Since then, Poli Bortone distanced herself from the UdC and started to prepare her return to the centre-right. In February 2011 she joined the new National Cohesion group in the Senate and, as of March, she is headed to the formation of a joint "Party of the South" along with Force of the South and We the South. On 14 July 2011 the three parties jointly launched the Federation of the South, later Great South.

Although its base remains Apulia, the party has opened regional and provincial sections also in Basilicata, Campania and Calabria.

In 2013 Great South is merged in the new Forza Italia, while IS took part in a project together with The Right of Francesco Storace, FLI of Roberto Menia and Tricolour Flame of Luca Romagnoli, to form a new party that will inspire for the National Alliance.

In 2014 Poli Bortone joined Brothers of Italy.

On 16 May 2015 Brothers of Italy decides the suspension of Adriana Poli Bortone, after her candidature with Forza Italia at 2015 Apulian regional election.

On 29 February 2016 Poli Bortone formalizes her adhesion to Forza Italia, along with her party I the South.

== Leadership ==
- President: Adriana Poli Bortone (2009–2016)
