= Stefan Jacobsson =

Swedish political leader

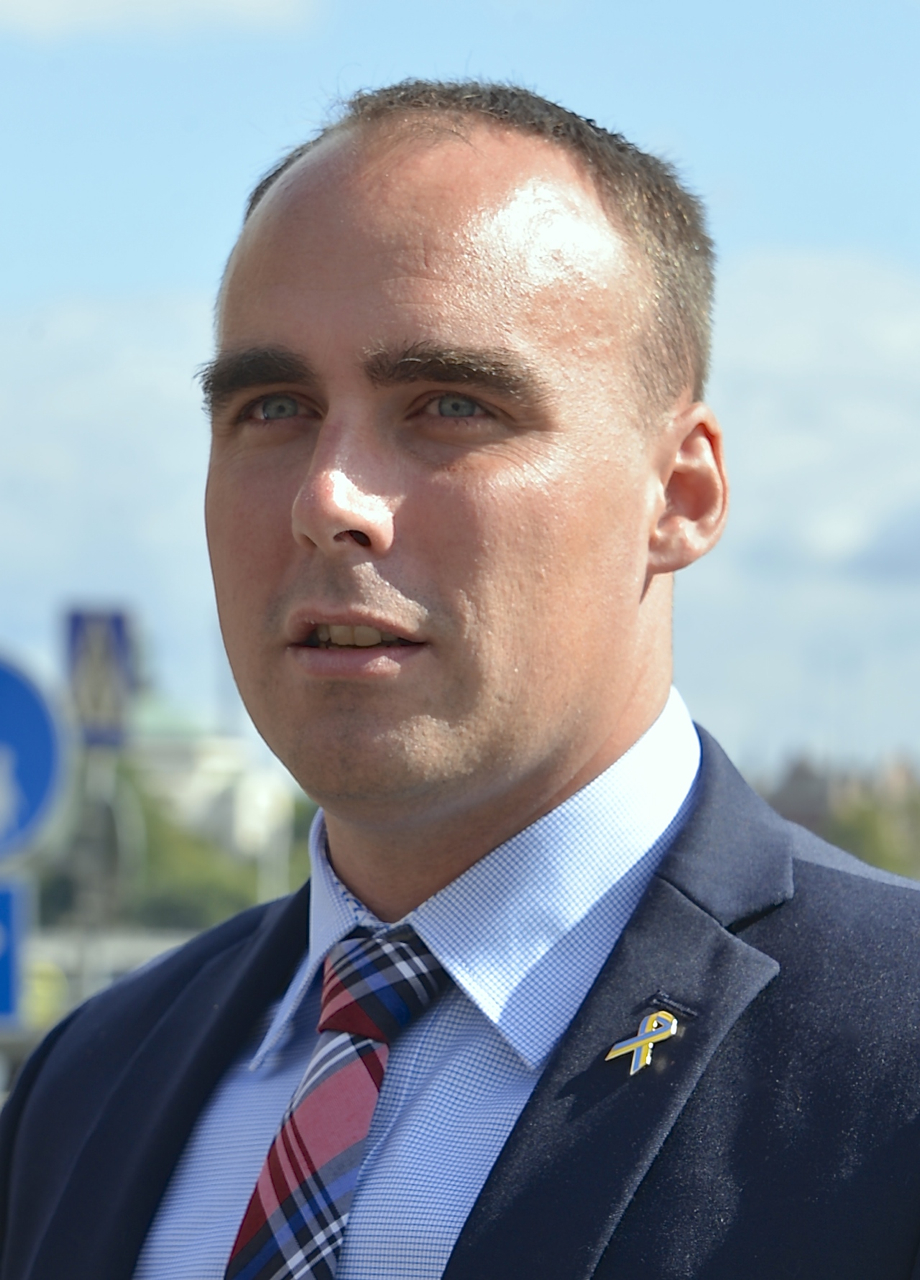
Jacobsson in 2014.

Stefan Jacobsson (born 30 December 1982 in Donsö, Sweden) was the leader of the now defunct Party of the Swedes.

Jacobsson got involved in Neo-Nazism when he was sixteen in the late 1990s. He was also a member of the Swedish Resistance Movement. In 2005, he was sentenced to two months in prison for rioting during a demonstration.

Jacobsson has also been involved in armed attacks against people.
