= Walter Luchetti =

Italian politician

Walter Luchetti (born 26 August 1937) is an Italian politician who served as the minister of agriculture between 1995 and 1996.

== Biography ==
Luchetti was born in Marsciano, Perugia, on 26 August 1937. He was appointed the minister of agriculture in the cabinet led by Prime Minister Lamberto Dini in January 1995. Luchetti served in the post for one year until May 1996. In the period between 1996 and 2001 Luchetti served at the Italian Senate.
