= Royal Italy =

Italian political party

Royal Italy - Star and Crown Italia Reale - Stella e Corona
- Motto: "FERT"
- Leader: Massimo Mallucci
- Founded: 1972
- Split from: Italian Democratic Party of Monarchist Unity
- Headquarters: Via Mercanti 30 C – Turin
- Newspaper: Italia Reale
- Think tank: Italian Monarchist Union
- Youth wing: Italian Monarchist Youth
- Membership (2012): 110
- Ideology: Monarchism; National conservatism
- Political position: Right-wing
- National affiliation: United Right (2022)

Royal Italy - Star and Crown (Italia Reale - Stella e Corona) is a minor Italian political party dedicated to the restoration of the monarchy in Italy, which was abolished in a 1946 referendum. Originally founded as Monarchist Alliance (Alleanza Monarchica), the party seeks to increase debate amongst the public about the monarchy, and seeks to re-establish a constitutional monarchy through political means.

It has never won any seats in Parliament. Like its predecessors, it has been hampered by provisions in the Italian Constitution that effectively foreclose any attempt to restore the monarchy short of a new constitution. The current Constitution explicitly forbids any attempt to change the republican form of government by constitutional amendment. Until 2002, it also forbade the male members of the former royal house, the House of Savoy, from setting foot on Italian soil. That provision was rescinded in 2002, but as part of the deal, presumptive heir Vittorio Emanuele gave up all claims to the throne.

== Election results ==
=== Italian Parliament ===
Election	Chamber of Deputies				Senate of the Republic			
Election	Votes	%	Seats	+/–	Votes	%	Seats	+/–
1983	13,573	0.04	0 / 630	New	Did not compete			
2018	3,628	0.01	0 / 630	Steady	Did not compete			
2022	Did not compete				2,415 (Note: In a joint list with United Right.)	0.01	0 / 200	Steady

== Logos ==
Monarchist Alliance
