= New Force (Italy) =

New Force Forza Nuova
- Abbreviation: FN
- National Secretary: Roberto Fiore
- Founded: 29 September 1997; 29 years ago
- Split from: Tricolour Flame
- Headquarters: Via Sansovino 1, Verona
- Newspaper: Ordine Futuro
- Youth wing: Lotta Studentesca Azione Frontale
- Ideology: Neo-fascism; Clerical fascism; Ultranationalism; Hard Euroscepticism
- Political position: Far-right
- National affiliation: Social Alternative (2004–2006)
- European affiliation: Alliance for Peace and Freedom
- International affiliation: World National-Conservative Movement (2015); International Sovereigntist League (since 2025)
- Colors: Black
- Anthem: "Fronte al sole"
- Chamber of Deputies: 0 / 400
- Senate: 0 / 200
- European Parliament: 0 / 76
- Regional Councils: 0 / 896

Party flag

Website
- forzanuova1997.it

New Force (Italian: Forza Nuova, FN) is a neo-fascist political party in Italy. It was founded by Roberto Fiore and Massimo Morsello. The party is a member of the Alliance for Peace and Freedom and was a part of the Social Alternative from 2003 to 2006. The party has often been strongly criticized for its radical positions and for acts of violence involving some militants. It also supported political campaigns opposed to same-sex marriage and immigration to Italy.

== History ==
New Force was formed within the Tricolour Flame (Fiamma Tricolore) and then began the process that led it to become a party. Its founders and financiers were two well-known names from the years of militancy in the lead for the movements of the Roman radical right, and for their neo-fascist political beliefs. The split occurred when Tricolour Flame of Pino Rauti began to oppose the distribution among its members of the bulletin of Roberto Fiore and Massimo Morsello.

In 1980, Fiore and Morsello escaped to London as fugitives after arrest warrants aimed at shedding light on the facts of the massacre at the Bologna railway station. The two were considered unrelated to the massacre, although they belonged, according to the judiciary, to the Nuclei Armati Rivoluzionari. They both stayed in England during the first government led by Margaret Thatcher with the status of political refugees for 20 years.

New Force was founded on 29 September 1997 at a meeting in Cave, in the province of Lazio, organized by Francesco Pallottino, leader of a Nazi rock group. It was not a random date because it is the one dedicated to St. Michael the Archangel, a symbol among other things of the Romanian Iron Guard, to which Forza Nuova historically refers. The founders Fiore and Morsello were still fugitives in London and did not return until 1999. Fiore was sentenced by a court to 66 months in prison. Morsello was sentenced to 98 months, although he did not serve them as he was dying from cancer (he died in March 2001).

The national launch of the group was in Latina with a conference in April 1998. Forza Nuova was placed on the political scene with the goal at the local level, to broaden their contacts on concrete campaigns against immigration, abortion, crime, and to hold together the conservative right-wing traditionalist with the social channel blocker.

On 25 March 1999, Massimo Morsello returned to Italy, and so did Roberto Fiore on 21 April of the following year. They were welcomed at the airport by deputies of the National Alliance and Forza Italia such as Francesco Storace, Enzo Fragalà, Alberto Simeone, Carlo Taormina, Ernesto Caccavale and Teodoro Buontempo. In early 2001, the movement could count on 2500 members and forty sections scattered across Italy.

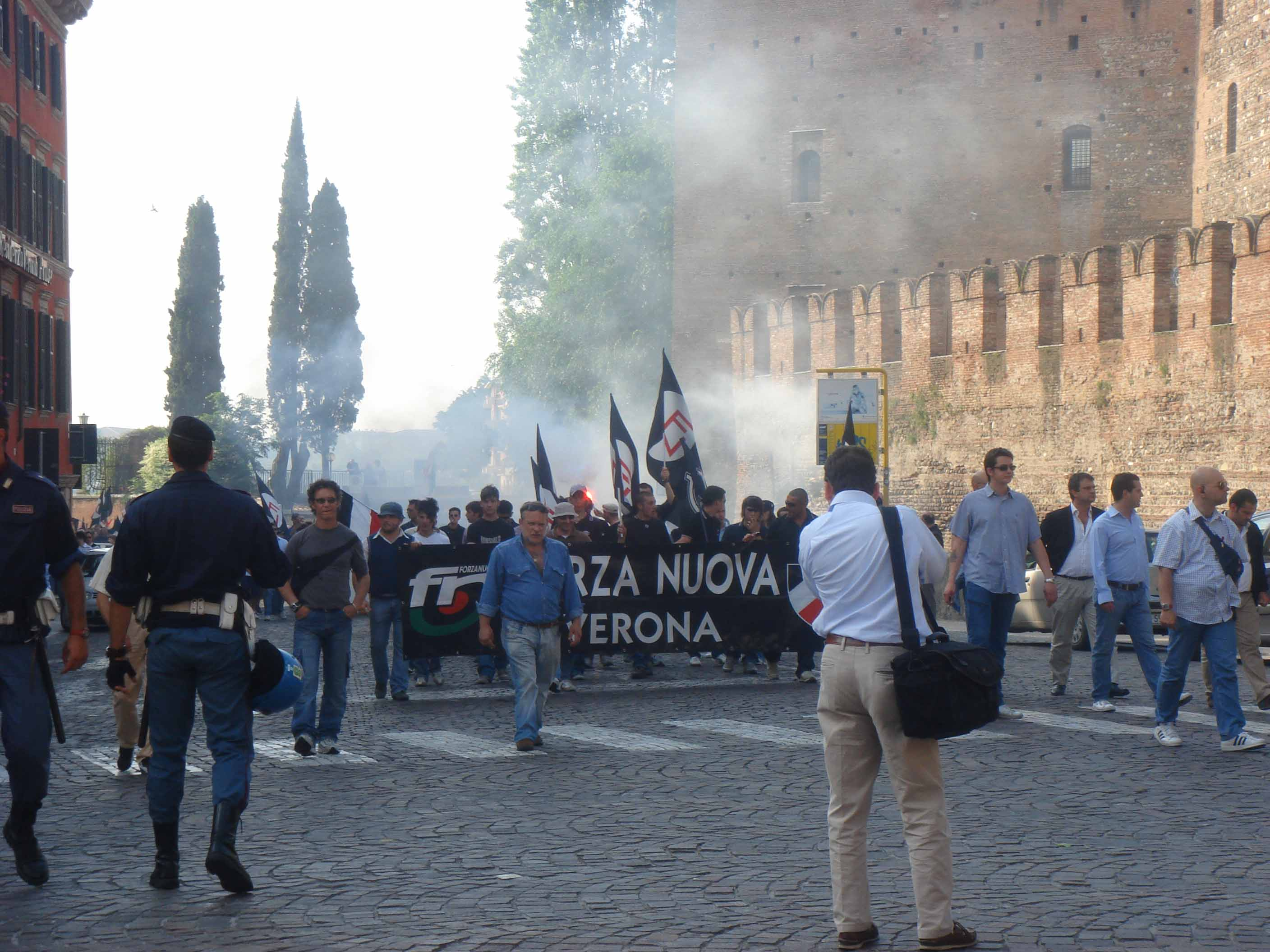
Forza Nuova demonstration in Verona.

In 2001 general election, New Force gained 13,622 votes at the Chamber of Deputies. In 2008 general election, the party won 0.30% in the Chamber and 0.26% in the Senate.

In 2013 general election, New Force got 89,812 votes (0.26%) in the Chamber of Deputies and 81,521 votes in the Senate, failing to elect any candidate but becoming the largest far-right party in Italy.

In 2016, New Force was featured in an episode of Huang's World on the television channel Viceland. In the episode, the members went out to eat with Eddie Huang, the host, and an apparent local Sicilian walked by and happened to recognize the politicians and yelled at them for their far-right views. It ends with the host and camera crew going to jail because, they claimed, the New Force members had them arrested by the police.

For the 2018 general election New Force joined with Tricolour Flame to form the Italy for the Italians coalition.

In May 2020 an internal party split takes place, dozens of offices throughout Italy leave the party giving life to a new entity called National Movement – The Network of the Patriots in controversy with the management of Fiore and Castellino considered not very transparent and too close to Matteo Salvini as well as aiming exclusively at obtaining media hype. The new political entity is officially founded on 10 October 2020.

On 9 October 2021 New Force militants attacked the Italian General Confederation of Labour's headquarters during a protest march against vaccine passports. Party founder and national secretary Roberto Fiore, the chief of the Roman chapter of the party Giuliano Castellino, the former NAR terrorist Luigi Aronica and other party members were arrested in the aftermath of the attack.

On 11 October 2021 the Public Prosecutor's Office at the Court of Rome imposed a block on the party's website.

== Presence outside Italy ==
Forza Nuova has longstanding ties to other European far-right organization, including the British National Party. Forza Nuova leader Roberto Fiore was once closely allied with the Ukrainian far-right Svoboda party, but following the beginning of the Russo-Ukrainian War, Forza Nuova and Fiore "made a considerable shift to the pro-Russian camp." According to the Political Capital Institute, a Hungarian think tank, Forza Nuova is one of a number of Russian-backed radical right political parties in Europe.

In 2016, a Forza Nuova affiliate continued attempts to recruit members in the United States. The group established Forza Nuova—USA chapters in New Jersey (Forza Nuova—USA's headquarters) and Phoenix, Arizona.

In 2018, Forza Nuova joined forces with Polish ultra-right organization National Radical Camp to "patrol" the beaches of Italian Romagna Riviera.

== Political platform ==
The political movement claims to aim for "national reconstruction" by achieving eighteen objectives:

- Cutting political spending; electing half of the deputies from among the productive, professional, and cultural sectors; abolishing party funding; requiring anyone assuming public office, including elected positions, to declare any membership in secret lodges.
- Reduction of bureaucracy and simplification of administrative procedures.
- Abolition of the regions and devolution of their powers to the provinces within the framework of a project for the political, fiscal, and economic development of local autonomy.
- Entrusting the State with ownership, management, and control of strategic economic sectors.
- Monetary sovereignty; Nationalization of the Bank of Italy and state control over savings and credit management activities; Repudiation of public debt owed to international financial institutions.
- Ban on credit institution executives participating in politics; Establishment of a special tribunal for banking-related offenses.
- Defense of life from conception; protection of the family and incentives for the birth rate, with absolute priority given to Italian families.
- The right to home ownership and the abolition of all taxes on primary residences; access to mortgages for the purchase of a primary residence, issued by public bodies and free from speculative interest.
- Gradual abolition of precarious employment; provision for a fair distribution of corporate profits between employer and employees.
- Education reform; a school system efficient in its curricula and rigorous in its selection processes; revitalization of the humanities across all levels of education; the right to education and maximum support for high-achieving students.
- Incentives for alternative energy and achieving energy independence.
- Revitalization of agriculture as a primary economic sector; granting of public lands to young agricultural entrepreneurs; support for the consumption of local food products; ban on the trade of genetically modified foods.
- Renegotiation of all public sector executive salaries and adoption of a maximum cap not exceeding five times an employee's wage; cuts to outsized pensions and a maximum ceiling set at five times the minimum pension.
- Simplification of the tax system; reduction of the tax burden and labor costs for small and medium-sized enterprises; deduction of actually incurred necessary expenses from family income.
- Justice system reform; separation of career paths between prosecuting and adjudicating magistrates; end of automatic career progression; civil and disciplinary liability of judges; certainty of punishment; provision for continuous work for convicted persons to facilitate compensation for crime victims.
- Immediate stop to immigration and progressive repatriation of non-EU nationals who cannot be integrated into the social fabric; reaffirmation of the ius sanguinis principle; immediate abolition of the social allowance for non-working immigrants.
- Deployment of the army to territories currently controlled by organized crime in order to wrest control from the mafias and restore it to State authority; seizure of all assets belonging to mafia members and their reallocation to victims of usury.
- Italy's withdrawal from NATO, condemnation of the Treaty of Lisbon, and the establishment of a Christian Europe, as a "homeland of free peoples and a confederation of sovereign nations."

New Force is also characterized by Euroscepticism; Roberto Fiore, FN leader, stated that he wanted to oppose "with all possible legal means" the entry into force of the Lisbon Treaty. As the Russo-Ukrainian War began, the party started supporting Russia, although it had previously enjoyed relations with Ukrainian far-right groups. This has created a disunity with CasaPound, which is pro-Ukraine. According to the Italian edition of the HuffPost, members of New Force went to fight in Ukraine for Russia, among them Andrea Palmeri, enlisted in the separatist forces in Donbas.

Regarding the Israeli–Palestinian conflict, New Force is pro-Palestine and are accused of supporting extremist groups like Hamas (views that are shared among the Italian neo-fascist groups). After the October 7 attacks, New Force led by Roberto Fiore organized demonstrations in support of "Palestinian resistance".

The party has also come out against the creation of a Mosque in Mestre.

The party denies being neo-fascist, declares itself "national-popular", and considers left and right obsolete.

== Election results ==
=== Italian Parliament ===
Election	Leader	Chamber of Deputies				Senate of the Republic			
Election	Leader	Votes	%	Seats	+/–	Votes	%	Seats	+/–
2001	Roberto Fiore	13,622	0.04	0 / 630	New	39,545	0.12	0 / 315	New
2006	Roberto Fiore	Into AS		0 / 630	0	Into AS		0 / 315	0
2008	Roberto Fiore	108,837	0.30	0 / 630	0	85,630	0.26	0 / 315	0
2013	Roberto Fiore	90,047	0.26	0 / 630	0	81,578	0.26	0 / 315	0
2018	Roberto Fiore	Into IaI		0 / 630	0	Into IaI		0 / 315	0

=== European Parliament ===
Election	Leader	Votes	%	Seats	+/–	EP Group
2004	Roberto Fiore	Into AS		0 / 78	New	–
2009	Roberto Fiore	146,619	0.47	0 / 72	0	–
2019	Roberto Fiore	41,077	0.15	0 / 76	0	–

== Symbolism ==
=== Symbols ===
2000–2004

2006–2020

New logo introduced in 2021, depicting a swallow, refers to the logo of Ala Littoria, national airline from 1934 to 1945.

=== Association with white shirts ===
During 2014 anti-immigration demonstrations, the party members wore white shirts. According to Italian journalist Fabio Spaterna, the use of white shirts symbolizes their "anti-immigrant instances". In addition to this distinctive clothing the forzanovisti (lit. 'new forcists') have flown the flag of the Russian Federation. New Force leader Roberto Fiore justified the Russian flag presence by affirming: "Irony of history, Putin is the only one who represents our values today".
