= Salvatore Meleleo =

Italian politician (1929–2018)

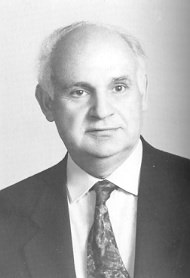
Salvatore Meleleo

Salvatore Meleleo (24 July 1929 – 2 August 2018) was an Italian politician.

Meleleo was born in Corigliano d'Otranto and trained as a surgeon. Affiliated with Christian Democracy, he served as mayor of Lecce between July 1977 to May 1983, and again from September 1985 to January 1986. Meleleo's mayoralty was followed by four terms in the Chamber of Deputies, from 1983 to 1994. He represented the Union of the Centre in the Senate from 2001 to 2006. Outside of politics, Meleleo ran a company that distributed mineral water.
