= 2015 Apulian regional election =

Italian regional election

← 2010	May 31, 2015	2020 →

All 51 seats to the Regional Council of Apulia
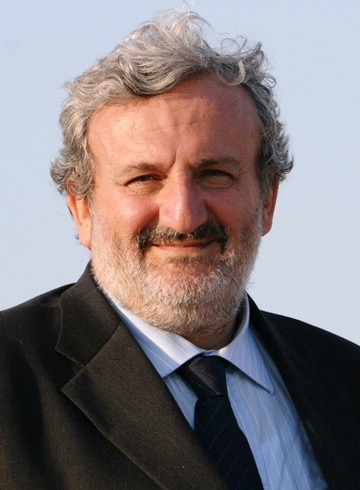

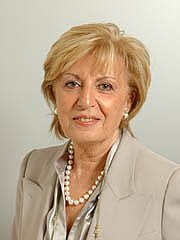
	Majority party	Minority party
Leader	Michele Emiliano	Antonella Laricchia
Party	Democratic Party	Five Star Movement
Alliance	Centre-left	—
Seats won	30	8
Seat change	▼16	new
Popular vote	793,831	310,304
Percentage	47.1%	18.4%
Swing	▼1.6%	new
	Third party	Fourth party
Leader	Francesco Schittulli	Adriana Poli Bortone
Party	Schittulli Movement	Forza Italia
Alliance	CoR–FdI–AP	FI–NcS–Others
Seats won	8	5
Popular vote	308,168	242,641
Percentage	18.3%	14.4%
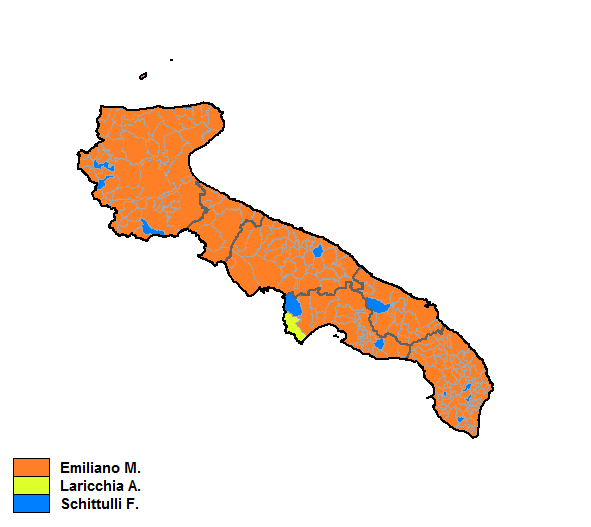
President before election
Nichi Vendola
SEL
Elected President
Michele Emiliano
PD

The Apulian regional election of 2015 were held on 31 May 2015.

The centre-left candidate Michele Emiliano won the election with a large margin from the Five Star Movement's candidate, Antonella Laricchia. The centre-right coalition broke up, presenting two different candidates, Francesco Schittulli, supported by former governor Raffaele Fitto, and Adriana Poli Bortone, supported by Silvio Berlusconi's Forza Italia, who arrived third and fourth.

== Results ==
31 May 2015 Apulian regional election results
Candidates	Votes	%	Seats	Parties	Votes	%	Seats
Michele Emiliano	793,831	47.12	1				
Michele Emiliano	793,831	47.12	1	Democratic Party	316,876	19.80	13
Michele Emiliano	793,831	47.12	1	Emiliano Mayor of Apulia (incl. SC, IdV, PdS)	155,840	9.74	6
Michele Emiliano	793,831	47.12	1	Us on the Left for Apulia (incl. SEL)	108,920	6.81	4
Michele Emiliano	793,831	47.12	1	Populars (incl. UdC, CD, RI)	99,021	6.19	3
Michele Emiliano	793,831	47.12	1	Apulia for Emiliano	68,366	4.27	3
Michele Emiliano	793,831	47.12	1	Communist Party of Italy	10,398	0.65	−
Michele Emiliano	793,831	47.12	1	Pensioners and Disabled	6,712	0.42	−
Michele Emiliano	793,831	47.12	1	Populars for Italy	6,575	0.41	−
Michele Emiliano	793,831	47.12	1	Total	772,708	48.28	29
Antonella Laricchia	310,304	18.42	1	Five Star Movement	275,114	17.19	7
Francesco Schittulli	308,168	18.29	–				
Francesco Schittulli	308,168	18.29	–	Beyond with Fitto	155,771	9.73	4
Francesco Schittulli	308,168	18.29	–	Schittulli Political Movement – Popular Area	101,817	6.36	4
Francesco Schittulli	308,168	18.29	–	Brothers of Italy	39,164	2.45	–
Francesco Schittulli	308,168	18.29	–	Total	296,752	18.54	8
Adriana Poli Bortone	242,641	14.40	–				
Adriana Poli Bortone	242,641	14.40	–	Forza Italia (incl. LAM)	181,896	11.37	5
Adriana Poli Bortone	242,641	14.40	–	Us with Salvini	38,661	2.42	−
Adriana Poli Bortone	242,641	14.40	–	National Apulia	9,186	0.57	−
Adriana Poli Bortone	242,641	14.40	–	Italian Liberal Party	1,797	0.11	−
Adriana Poli Bortone	242,641	14.40	–	Total	231,540	14.47	5
Riccardo Rossi	17,110	1.02	–	The Other Apulia (incl. PRC)	14,513	0.91	−
Gregorio Mariggiò	7,559	0.45	–	Federation of the Greens	6,278	0.39	−
Michele Rizzi	5,056	0.30	–	Communist Alternative Party	3,414	0.21	−
Total candidates	1,684,669	100.00	2	Total parties	1,600,319	100.00	49
Source: Ministry of the Interior – Historical Archive of Elections

== See also ==
- 2015 Italian regional elections
