= Roberto Fiore =

Italian politician (born 1959)

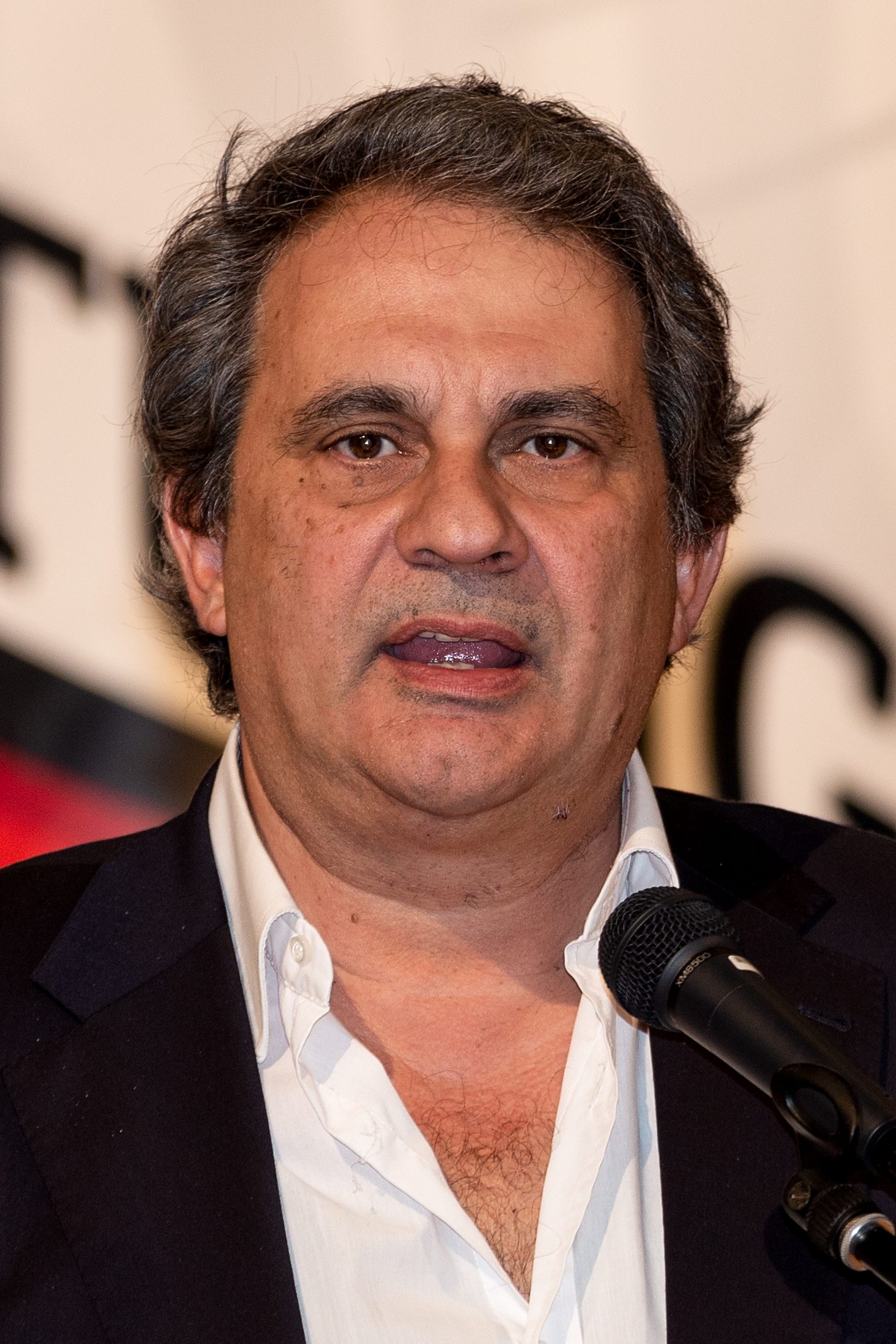
- Fiore in 2018

Leader of Forza Nuova
- Incumbent
- Assumed office 29 September 1997
- Preceded by: Office created

President of the Alliance for Peace and Freedom
- Incumbent
- Assumed office 4 February 2015
- Deputy: Nick Griffin
- Preceded by: Alliance established

Member of the European Parliament for Central Italy
- In office 16 May 2008 – 13 July 2009
- Preceded by: Alessandra Mussolini

Personal details
- Born: 15 April 1959 (age 67) Rome, Italy
- Party: Forza Nuova
- Other political affiliations: Alliance for Peace and Freedom (since 2015)
- Height: 1.77 m (5 ft 10 in)
- Children: 11
- Profession: Politician

Roberto Fiore (born 15 April 1959) is an Italian neo-fascist politician who has been the leader of the party, Forza Nuova, since its foundation in 1997, as well as president of the Alliance for Peace and Freedom since 2015. He briefly served as a Member of the European Parliament (MEP) for Central Italy from 2008 until 2009.

Fiore was convicted in Italy for subversion and armed gang activity and for his links to the right-wing militant organization Terza Posizione ("Third Position"). He self-identifies as a neo-fascist.

== In the United Kingdom ==
After the police found a large quantity of explosives and weapons in a local office of the political organization Terza Posizione in the 1980s, Roberto Fiore migrated to the United Kingdom in order to avoid arrest.

During his London period, he was close to the leader of the British National Party Nick Griffin and to the terrorist and singer-songwriter Massimo Morsello.

In 1985, he was convicted in absentia of armed gang and subversive association, but the British government prohibited his extradition.

The anti-fascist magazine Searchlight claimed that Fiore was working for the Secret Intelligence Service. The allegation that he worked for MI6 was also made in para 2.12.11 of the Report drawn up on behalf of the European Parliament's Committee of Inquiry into Racism and Xenophobia, 1991 (The Ford Report).

== Political activism ==
Fiore is generally considered to be a neofascist leader. In England Fiore became a close friend of Nick Griffin, sharing a flat with him. As of 2008, Fiore was running a language school called CL English Language.

Fiore has since returned to Italy, after his conviction became non-punishable for the statute of limitations, and is active in politics as the leader of the nationalist Forza Nuova party (a group he co-founded with Morsello), one of the constituent parts of Alternativa Sociale, allied in the House of Freedoms for the 2006 political elections in Italy. The party Forza Nuova has been defined as "nazi-fascist formation" by two verdicts of Court of Cassation.

In 2008, he joined as a speaker on the identitarian Nordic Festival (Nordiska Festivalen) in Sweden, where he spoke about European identity. He participated in Budapest on 23 October 2008 in the commemorations of the Hungarian Insurrection against control by the Soviet Union in 1956, at the invitation of the Hungarian far-right movement HVIM. He also took up the seat in the European Parliament vacated by Alessandra Mussolini. In 2009 he gave a speech at the British National Party's annual Red White & Blue Festival.

In March 2011 he led demonstrations of Forza Nuova against the recent surge of immigrants to the island of Lampedusa, stating that: "Local people are now asking us to help secure the beaches, and if the Government continues to fail in its duty to protect the people, and also the territorial integrity of Italy and Europe, we will take up that challenge".

In February 2020, Fiore lost his court case for defamation against the newspaper L'Espresso.

On 10 October 2021, he was arrested after assaulting the CGIL offices in Rome.

He has an estimated net worth of 30 million euros.

On 7th October 2026, he was sentenced by the Italian Court of Appeal to 8 years and 6 months in jail for his involvement in the assault to CGIL offices in 2021
