= Tricolour Flame =

Tricolour Flame Fiamma Tricolore
- Secretary: Daniele Cerbella
- President: Giuseppe Manoli
- Honorary President: Giorgio Tigano
- Founder: Pino Rauti
- Founded: 27 January 1995; 31 years ago
- Split from: Italian Social Movement
- Headquarters: Largo Rosolino Pilo 14, Catania, Sicily
- Youth wing: Youth of the Flame
- Membership (2020): 650
- Ideology: Neo-fascism; • Italian nationalism; • Ultranationalism; • Anti-Zionism; • Anti-capitalism; • Anti-Americanism; • Hard Euroscepticism
- Political position: Far-right
- European affiliation: Alliance of European National Movements (2009–2019)
- European Parliament group: Identity, Tradition, Sovereignty (2007)
- Anthem: "Inno Fiamma Tricolore"
- Chamber of Deputies: 0 / 400
- Senate: 0 / 200
- European Parliament: 0 / 76
- Regional Councils: 0 / 896

Website
- fiammatricolore.org

The Social Movement Tricolour Flame (Italian: Movimento Sociale Fiamma Tricolore, MSFT), commonly known as Tricolour Flame (Fiamma Tricolore), is a neo-fascist political party in Italy.

== History ==
The party was started by the more radical members of the Fascist Italian Social Movement, led by Pino Rauti, who refused to join the mainstream conservative party National Alliance. Rauti was later succeeded by Luca Romagnoli, who took over leadership.

In the 2004 European Parliamentary Election the party gained enough votes in the Southern constituency to elect Luca Romagnoli to the European Parliament. The party was then a member of the House of Freedoms coalition for the 2006 general election.

In the coming of the 2008 general election, Tricolour Flame formed a joint list called The Right–Tricolour Flame with The Right of Francesco Storace, a splinter group of National Alliance, in support of the candidacy of Daniela Santanchè for Prime Minister.

On 8 November 2013, Luca Romagnoli, secretary of Tricolour Flame, together with the secretary of The Right Francesco Storace, the regent of Future and Freedom Roberto Menia, the leader of I the South Adriana Poli Bortone, Domenico Nania of the association New Alliance, Oreste Tofani of the association Nazione Sovrana, Antonio Buonfiglio of the association Il Popolo della Vita and Roberto Buonasorte, editor of the online newspaper Il Giornale d'Italia, founded the Movement for National Alliance, a federation of right movements inspired to National Alliance. On 9 December 2013 the Central Committee of Tricolour Flame distrusted Luca Romagnoli, because he joined this initiative without having preventively sought the opinion of the same Committee, and Attilio Carelli became regent Secretary of the party. After the expulsion Romagnoli founded instead his new political movement, Social Right.

On 13 and 14 December 2014, the VII National Congress officially appointed Carelli as Secretary of the party.

For the 2018 general election, it formed the Italy for the Italians coalition along with the New Force party. At 2019 European Parliamentary Election the party decides not to participate.

On 12 September 2021, the Central Committee of the party declared the Secretary Carelli officially lapsed due to the failure to present the budget for the year 2020. The same Central Committee, on 6 October 2021 conferred the mandate of Regent Secretary to Giuseppe Manoli.

On 15 and 16 January 2022, the IX National Congress took place entirely on the Zoom platform, on this occasion Daniele Cerbella was elected as National Secretary.

== Ideology ==
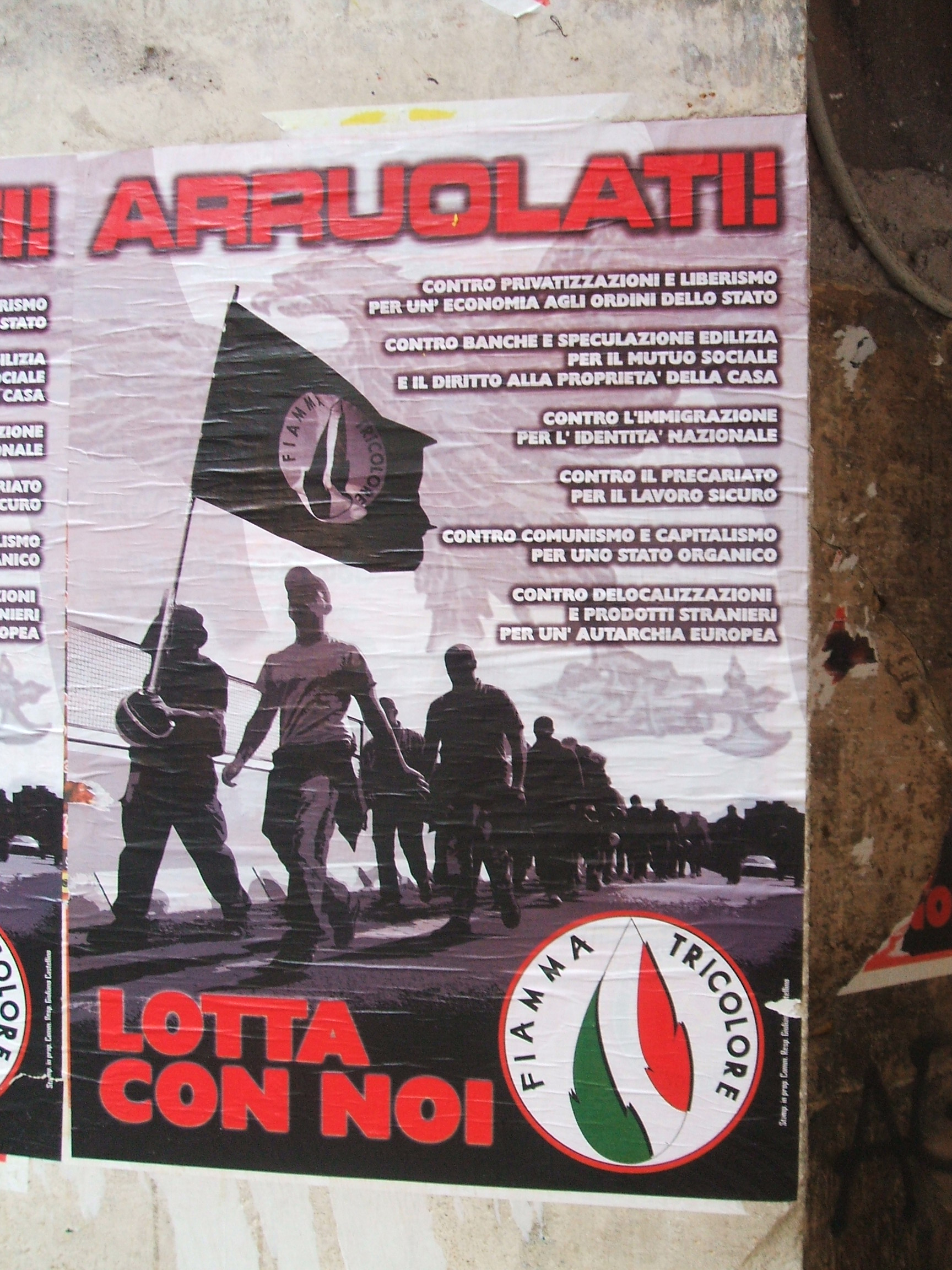
Propaganda poster posted in Rome

Tricolour Flame is the party of the Italian far-right most closely tied to the legacy of Italian Social Republic (RSI). The RSI is usually seen by the party as the example of what fascism should have been, in particular as an example of true welfare state. As a sign of this legacy, the party, for example, guarantees free membership for ex-RSI military. A press release from the Rome section of the party states:

Tricolour Flame is a movement born just to remark its own ideal proximity to the Social Republic and its fighters. A Republic on which side we would surely have fought, if only the fate would have let us born these years. And we should have surely fought to win, because for us the political synthesis originated from the thought of Benito Mussolini is for us the only political, economical and spiritual system able to bring the freedom and social justice that are today denied to Italians and all other world populations. ... [We] relaunch our battle for a better tomorrow, embodying the ideals of the Black Shirts of Alessandro Pavolini.

Tricolour Flame maintains a fairly strong anti-capitalist stance, and it can be thought to be the Italian party closest to third positionist ideology along with the New Force and CasaPound parties.

Political manifests often tend towards attractive, modern graphics and clear-cut, even humorous slogans. Tricolour Flame is also very close to youth far-right organizations and initiatives, of which the most relevant is CasaPound, a social centre in Rome.

The party is against the regionalism promoted by the Northern League for an independent "Padania", instead favoring a united Italy.

== Organization ==
=== Leadership ===
- Secretary: Pino Rauti (1995–2002), Luca Romagnoli (2002–2013), Attilio Carelli (2013–2021), Giuseppe Manoli (2021–2022), Daniele Cerbella (2022–present).
- President: Romolo Sabatini (1995–2000), Stelvio Dal Piaz (2000–2002), Pino Rauti (2002–2004), Rocco Tauro (2004–2013), Attilio Carelli (2013–2014), Francesco Condorelli Caff (2014–2025), Giuseppe Manoli (2025–present).
- Honorary President: Manlio Sargenti (1995–2001), Alessandro Bordoni (2013–2018), Carlo Morganti (2018–2023), Giorgio Tigano (2025–present).

=== Membership ===
Among the more controversial members of Tricolur Flame are Pietro Puschiavo and Maurizio Boccacci. In 1985 Puschiavo was a founding member of the Veneto Skinheads Front, a far-right skinhead group based in Veneto and connected to Blood and Honour. Boccacci is the former leader of the Western Political Movement, a far-right skinhead organization based in Rome.

== Election results ==
=== Italian Parliament ===
Election	Leader	Chamber of Deputies				Senate of the Republic			
Election	Leader	Votes	%	Seats	+/–	Votes	%	Seats	+/–
1996	Pino Rauti	339,351	0.91	0 / 630	New	747,487	2.29	1 / 315	New
2001	Pino Rauti	143,963	0.39	0 / 630	0	340,221	1.00	1 / 315	0
2006	Luca Romagnoli	230,506	0.60	0 / 630	0	204,498	0.60	0 / 315	▼1
2008	Luca Romagnoli	Into LD–FT		0 / 630	0	Into LD–FT		0 / 315	0
2013	Luca Romagnoli	44,753	0.13	0 / 630	0	52,106	0.17	0 / 315	0
2018	Attilio Carelli	Into IaI		0 / 630	0	Into IaI		0 / 315	0

=== European Parliament ===
Election	Leader	Votes	%	Seats	+/–	EP Group
1999	Pino Rauti	496,030	1.60	1 / 87	New	TGI
2004	Luca Romagnoli	237,058	0.73	1 / 78	0	NI
2009	Luca Romagnoli	246,403	0.80	0 / 72	▼1	–

== See also ==
- New Force
