= Adriana Poli Bortone =

Italian politician (born 1943)

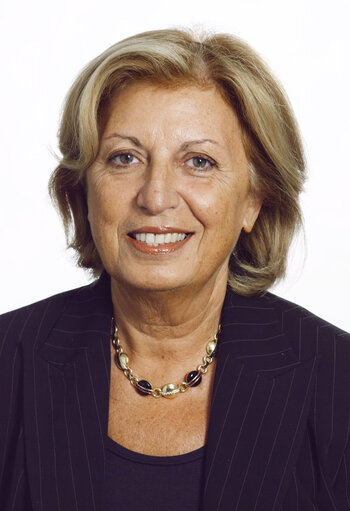

Mayor of Lecce
- Incumbent
- Assumed office 27 June 2024
- Preceded by: Carlo Salvemini
- In office 25 May 1998 – 28 May 2007
- Preceded by: Stefano Salvemini
- Succeeded by: Paolo Perrone

Minister of Agriculture
- In office 10 May 1994 – 17 January 1995
- Prime Minister: Silvio Berlusconi
- Preceded by: Alfredo Luigi Diana
- Succeeded by: Walter Luchetti

Member of the Senate of the Republic
- In office 29 April 2008 – 14 March 2013
- Constituency: Apulia

Member of the European Parliament
- In office 20 July 1999 – 28 April 2008
- Constituency: Southern Italy

Member of the Chamber of Deputies
- In office 12 July 1983 – 14 April 1999
- Constituency: Lecce

Personal details
- Born: 25 August 1943 (age 83) Lecce, Italy
- Party: I the South (since 2009)
- Other political affiliations: MSI (until 1995); AN (1995−2009); FdI (2014−2015); FI (2016−2019); FT (2019−2022)
- Education: University of Lecce
- Profession: University professor

Adriana Poli Bortone (born 25 August 1943) is an Italian politician who was a member of the European Parliament from 1999 to 2008. She represented Southern Italy. She was mayor of Lecce from 1998 to 2007 and since 2024.

== Biography ==
Born in Lecce, she became Assistant lecturer in Latin literature at the University of Lecce in 1965. In 1985, she became an associate professor of the same subject. From 1967 to 1998, she was a member of the Lecce Municipal Council and, from 1981 to 1990, National secretary for women of the Italian Social Movement. From 1990 to 2000, she was also a member of the national executive of MSI and, subsequently, the National Alliance. Poli Bortone was elected for the first time to the Chamber of Deputies in 1983, and in 1994, she was appointed for a month as Vice President of the Chamber. In 1994, she also served as Agriculture Minister in the Berlusconi I Cabinet. In 1998, she was elected mayor of Lecce and re-confirmed in 2002.

In the 1999 European Parliament election, Poli Bortone was elected MEP with AN, while in the 2008 general election, she was elected to the Senate with The People of Freedom. In 2009, she left the PdL to find her party, I the South. In the 2013 general election, she was a candidate for the Senate in Apulia with Great South but wasn't re-elected. In 2014, Poli Bortone joined Brothers of Italy, but left the party in 2015, when Forza Italia nominated her for the regional election in Apulia, while FdI decided to support the candidacy of Francesco Schittulli. Finally, she gained 14% of the votes and wasn't elected to the Regional Council. Subsequently, on 29 February 2016, she declared her intention to join Forza Italia.

In 2019, Poli Bortone left Forza Italia and joined the neo-fascist party Tricolour Flame. In 2022 she switched to Italexit, a Eurosceptic party led by journalist Gianluigi Paragone.

== Electoral history ==
Election	House	Constituency	Party	Votes	Result
1983	Chamber of Deputies	Lecce–Brindisi–Taranto	MSI	26,422	Elected
1987	Chamber of Deputies	Lecce–Brindisi–Taranto	MSI	32,515	Elected
1992	Chamber of Deputies	Lecce–Brindisi–Taranto	MSI	23,431	Elected
1994	Chamber of Deputies	Lecce	AN	35,131	Elected
1996	Chamber of Deputies	Lecce	AN	38,857	Elected
1999	European Parliament	Southern Italy	AN	52,593	Elected
2004	European Parliament	Southern Italy	AN	92,222	Elected
2008	Senate of the Republic	Apulia	PdL	– (Note: Candidate in a closed list proportional representation system.)	Elected
2013	Senate of the Republic	Apulia	GS	–	Not elected

Italian Chamber of Deputies
Preceded by Title jointly held	Deputy; 1983–1999	Succeeded by Title jointly held
European Parliament
Preceded by Title jointly held	Member of Parliament; 1999–2008	Succeeded by Title jointly held
Italian Senate
Preceded by Title jointly held	Senator for Apulia; 2008 – 2013	Succeeded by Title jointly held
Political offices
Preceded by Title jointly held	Vice-President of the Italian Chamber of Deputies; 1994	Succeeded by Title jointly held
Preceded by Alfredo Luigi Diana	Italian Minister of Agriculture; 1994–1995	Succeeded by Walter Luchetti
Preceded by Stefano Salvemini	Mayor of Lecce; 1998–2007	Succeeded by Paolo Perrone
Preceded by Carlo Salvemini	Mayor of Lecce since 2024	Incumbent
