= 2018 Italian general election =

- 4 March 2018

630 seats in the Chamber (C) · 315 seats in the Senate (S) 316 seats needed for a majority in the Chamber 160 seats needed for a majority in the Senate
- Opinion polls
- Registered: 46,505,499 (C) · 45,210,950 (S)
- Turnout: 33,923,321 (C) · 72.94% (▼2.26 pp); 31,231,814 (S) · 73.01% (▼2.10 pp)
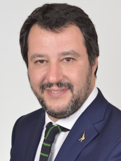

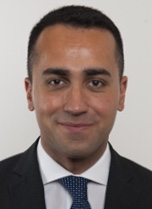

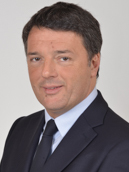

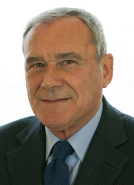
	First party	Second party
Leader	Matteo Salvini (Note: At the time of the election, the centre-right coalition did not have a unitary leadership. According to an agreement between the leaders of the three main parties of the coalition (Silvio Berlusconi of Forza Italia, Matteo Salvini of the League, and Giorgia Meloni of Brothers of Italy), the choice of the candidate for Prime Minister of Italy would be up to the party with the most votes. Before the election, Berlusconi continued to be considered the coalition's leader as Forza Italia was ahead of its allies in the polls. Since Berlusconi was barred from holding public office following a conviction, he announced three days before the election that Antonio Tajani would be Forza Italia's candidate for Prime Minister; however, contrary to expectations, the League scored more votes than Forza Italia, and Salvini became the unitary candidate for Prime Minister of the centre-right coalition.)	Luigi Di Maio
Party	League	Five Star Movement
Alliance	Centre-right coalition	–
Leader since	N/A	23 September 2017
Leader's seat	Calabria 1 (S) (Note: In 2019, following a recount of the votes, Salvini lost his seat in the Calabria 1 constituency, recovering it in the Lazio 1 constituency.)	Acerra (C)
Seats won	265 (C) · 137 (S)	227 (C) · 112(S)
Seat change	▲139 · ▲17	▲119 · ▲58
Popular vote	12,152,345 (C); 11,327,549 (S)	10,732,066 (C); 9,733,928 (S)
Percentage	37.0% (C); 37.5% (S)	32.7% (C); 32.2% (S)
Swing	▲7.8 pp (C) ▲6.8 pp (S)	▲7.1 pp (C) ▲8.4 pp (S)
	Third party	Fourth party
Leader	Matteo Renzi	Pietro Grasso
Party	Democratic Party	Free and Equal
Alliance	Centre-left coalition	–
Leader since	7 May 2017	3 December 2017
Leader's seat	Florence (S)	Sicily (S)
Seats won	122 (C) · 60 (S)	14 (C) · 4 (S)
Seat change	▼227 (C) · ▼65 (S)	New
Popular vote	7,506,723 (C); 6,947,199 (S)	1,114,799 (C); 991,159 (S)
Percentage	22.9% (C); 23.0% (S)	3.4% (C); 3.3% (S)
Swing	▼6.7 pp (C) ▼8.6 pp (S)	New
- Election results maps by constituencies for the Chamber of Deputies (on the left) and for the Senate (on the right)
Prime Minister before election
Paolo Gentiloni
Democratic Party
Prime Minister after the election
Giuseppe Conte
Independent (close to M5S)

The 2018 Italian general election was held on 4 March 2018 after the Italian Parliament was dissolved by President Sergio Mattarella on 28 December 2017. Voters were electing the 630 members of the Chamber of Deputies and the 315 elective members of the Senate of the Republic for the 18th legislature of the Italian Republic since 1948. The election took place concurrently with the Lombard and Lazio regional elections. No party or coalition gained an absolute majority in the parliament, even though the centre-right coalition won a plurality of seats as a coalition, and the Five Star Movement (M5S) won a plurality of seats as an individual party.

The centre-right coalition, whose main party was the right-wing League led by Matteo Salvini, emerged with a plurality of seats in the Chamber of Deputies and in the Senate, while the anti-establishment M5S led by Luigi Di Maio became the party with the largest number of votes. The centre-left coalition, led by former Prime Minister Matteo Renzi of the governing Democratic Party (PD), came third; however, no political group or party won an outright majority, resulting in a hung parliament.

The 2018 Italian government formation lasted three months and the first Conte government was formed on 1 June between the M5S and the League, whose leaders both became deputy prime ministers in a populist coalition government led by the M5S-linked independent Giuseppe Conte as Prime Minister of Italy. The 2019 Italian government crisis started when the League withdrew its support of the government and the coalition ended with Conte's resignation on 20 August. A new M5S-led coalition was formed with the centre-left PD and the Free and Equal left-wing parliamentary group, with Conte at its head, on 5 September 2019. Amid the 2021 Italian government crisis, the second Conte government was replaced by a national unity government headed by Mario Draghi.

== Background ==
In the 2013 Italian general election held in March, none of the three main alliances (the centre-right coalition led by Silvio Berlusconi, the centre-left coalition led by Pier Luigi Bersani, and the anti-establishment, populist Five Star Movement (M5S) led by Beppe Grillo) won an outright majority in the Italian Parliament. After a failed attempt to form a government by Bersani, then-secretary of the Democratic Party (PD), and Giorgio Napolitano's reluctantly-accepted second term as President of Italy in the 2013 Italian presidential election held in April, Enrico Letta, Bersani's deputy, received the task of forming a grand coalition government. The Letta Cabinet consisted of the PD, Berlusconi's People of Freedom (PdL), Civic Choice (SC), the Union of the Centre (UDC), and the Italian Radicals (RI).

On 16 November 2013, Berlusconi re-launched Forza Italia (FI), named like the previous Forza Italia party (1994–2009). Additionally, Berlusconi announced that FI would be opposed to Letta's government, causing the split from the PdL/FI of a large group of deputies and senators led by Minister of Interior Angelino Alfano, who launched the alternative New Centre-Right (NCD) party and remained loyal to the government, which also came to include the Populars for Italy (PpI).

Following the election of Matteo Renzi as secretary of the PD in December 2013, there were persistent tensions culminating in Letta's resignation as Prime Minister in February 2014. The Renzi Cabinet was based on the same coalition, including the NCD, but in a new fashion. The new Prime Minister had a strong mandate from the PD, which was reinforced in May by the party's strong showing in the 2014 European Parliament election in Italy; the 2015 Italian presidential election resulted in the election of Sergio Mattarella, a former PD member, as the president of Italy in January. While in power, Renzi implemented several reforms, including the Italian electoral law of 2015 (Italicum) that would be declared partially unconstitutional by the Constitutional Court of Italy in January 2017 and replaced by the Italian electoral law of 2017 (Rosatellum), and a relaxation of labour and employment laws known as the Jobs Act with the intention of boosting economic growth that would also found by the same court to be partially unconstitutional in September 2018, which was upheld in July 2020, plus a thorough reform of the public administration, the simplification of the civil trial, the recognition of same-sex unions (not marriages), and the abolition of several minor taxes.

As a result of the Libyan Civil War, a major problem faced by Renzi was the high level of illegal immigration to Italy. During his tenure, there was an increase in the number of immigrants rescued at sea being brought to southern Italian ports, prompting criticism from the M5S, FI, and the Northern League, and causing a loss of popularity for Renzi. Into 2016, opinion polls registered the PD's strength, the growth of the M5S, the Northern League, and Brothers of Italy (FdI), FI's decline, SC's disappearance, and the replacement of Left Ecology Freedom (SEL) with Italian Left (SI).

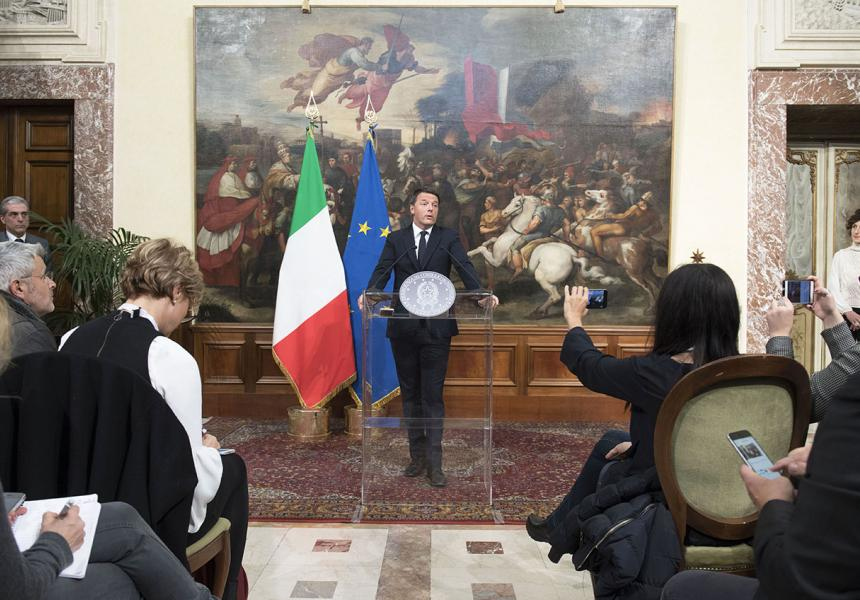
Matteo Renzi announcing his resignation after the 2016 constitutional referendum result

In the 2016 Italian constitutional referendum, a constitutional reform proposed by Renzi's government and duly approved by Parliament was rejected 59% to 41%. Under the reform, the Senate would have been composed of 100 members, of which 95 are regional representatives and five are presidential appointees. Following defeat in December 2016, Renzi stepped down as Prime Minister and was replaced by Minister of Foreign Affairs Paolo Gentiloni, another PD member and deputy.

In early 2017, in opposition to Renzi's policies, some left-wing PD members led by Bersani, Massimo D'Alema, and Roberto Speranza launched, along with SI splinters, the Democratic and Progressive Movement (MDP). Contextually, the NCD was transformed into Popular Alternative (AP). In April, Renzi was re-elected secretary of the PD and became the party's candidate for Prime Minister, defeating Minister of Justice Andrea Orlando and the governor of Apulia Michele Emiliano.

In May 2017, Matteo Salvini was re-elected federal secretary of the Northern League and launched his own bid. Under Salvini, the party had emphasised Euroscepticism, opposition to immigration, and other right-wing populist policies. His aim had been to re-launch it as a nationalist party, withering any notion of northern separatism. This focus became particularly evident in December 2017, when the party presented its new electoral logo dropping Nord ("Northern"). That same month, the League for Salvini Premier was founded as a sister party to promote Salvini's candidature as Prime Minister. Political commentators have since described it as a parallel party of the League, with the aim of politically replacing the latter, which had been burdened by a statutory debt of €49 million.

In September 2017, Luigi Di Maio was selected as candidate for Prime Minister and political head of the M5S, replacing Grillo; in the following months, Grillo was accused by critics of continuing to play his role as de facto leader of the party, while an increasingly important, albeit unofficial, role was assumed by Davide Casaleggio, son of Gianroberto, a web strategist who founded the M5S along with Grillo in 2009 and died in 2016. In January 2018, Grillo separated his own blog from the movement; his blog was used in the previous years as an online newspaper of the M5S and the main propaganda tool. This event was seen by many as the proof that Grillo was slowly leaving politics.

The autumn registered some major developments to the left of the political spectrum. In November, the RI, Forza Europa, and individual liberals launched a joint list named More Europe (+E), led by the long-time RI leader Emma Bonino. In December, the MDP, SI, and Possible launched a joint list named Free and Equal (LeU) under the leadership of Pietro Grasso, the president of the Senate and former anti-mafia prosecutor. That same month, the Italian Socialist Party, the Federation of the Greens, Civic Area, and Progressive Area formed a list named Together in support of the PD, and the Communist Refoundation Party, the Italian Communist Party, social centres, minor parties, local committees, associations, and groups launched a far-left joint list named Power to the People (PaP) under the leadership of Viola Carofalo.

In late December 2017, the centrist post-NCD Popular Alternative (AP), which had been a key coalition partner for the PD, divided itself among those who wanted to return into the centre-right's fold and those who supported Renzi's coalition. Two groups of AP splinters (one led by Maurizio Lupi and the other by Enrico Costa) formed, along with Direction Italy, Civic Choice, Act!, Cantiere Popolare, and the Movement for Autonomies, a joint list within the centre-right named Us with Italy (NcI). The list was later enlarged to the Union of the Centre and other minor parties. The remaining members of the AP, Italy of Values, Centrists for Europe, Solidary Democracy, and minor groups joined forces in the pro-PD Popular Civic List (CP) led by Minister of Health Beatrice Lorenzin.

On 28 December 2017, President Mattarella dissolved the parliament and a new general election was called for 4 March 2018.

On 21 February 2018, Marco Minniti, the Italian Minister of the Interior, warned: "There is a concrete risk of the mafias conditioning electors' free vote." The Sicilian Mafia have been active in Italian election meddling; the Camorra and 'Ndrangheta organisations have also taken an interest.

In late February 2018, Berlusconi indicated Antonio Tajani, the president of the European Parliament, as his candidate for the premiership if the centre-right coalition won the general election, and if FI achieved a plurality of the votes inside the coalition, condition that did not occur, resulting in a victory of the League, the party led by Salvini.

== Campaign ==
The first phase of the electoral campaign was marked by the statement of President Mattarella to parties for the presentation of "realistic and concrete" proposals during the traditional end of the year's message, in which he also expressed the wish for a high participation in the ballot.

=== Electoral programmes ===
The electoral programme of the PD included, among the main points, the introduction of a minimum hourly wage of €10, a measure that would affect 15% of workers, that is those workers who do not adhere to the national collective agreements, plus a cut of the contributory wedge for permanent contracts, a relocation allowance and an increase in subsidies for the unemployed, a monthly allowance of €80 for parents for each minor child, fiscal detraction of €240 for parents with children, and the progressive reduction of the rates of IRPEF and IRES, respectively the income tax and the corporate tax. Regarding immigration, which had been a major problem in Italy for the previous years, the PD advocated a reduction in migrant flows through bilateral agreements with the countries of origin and pretended to a halt to European Union funding for countries like Hungary and Poland that have refused to take in any of the 600,000 migrants who have reached Italy through the Mediterranean over the past four years. Among the PD's allies, the CP proposed free nursery schools, a tax exemption for corporate welfare, and other measures regarding public health, including the contrast to the long waiting list in hospitals, the abolition of the so-called "supertickets", and an extension of home care for the elderly. +E advocated the re-launch of the process of European integration and federalisation of the European Union towards the formation of the United States of Europe. This was also supported by the PD, with the PD's leader Renzi saying the United States of Europe is the future. In opposition to the PD's policies implemented by Minister of Interior Marco Minniti, +E advocated the social integration of migrants.

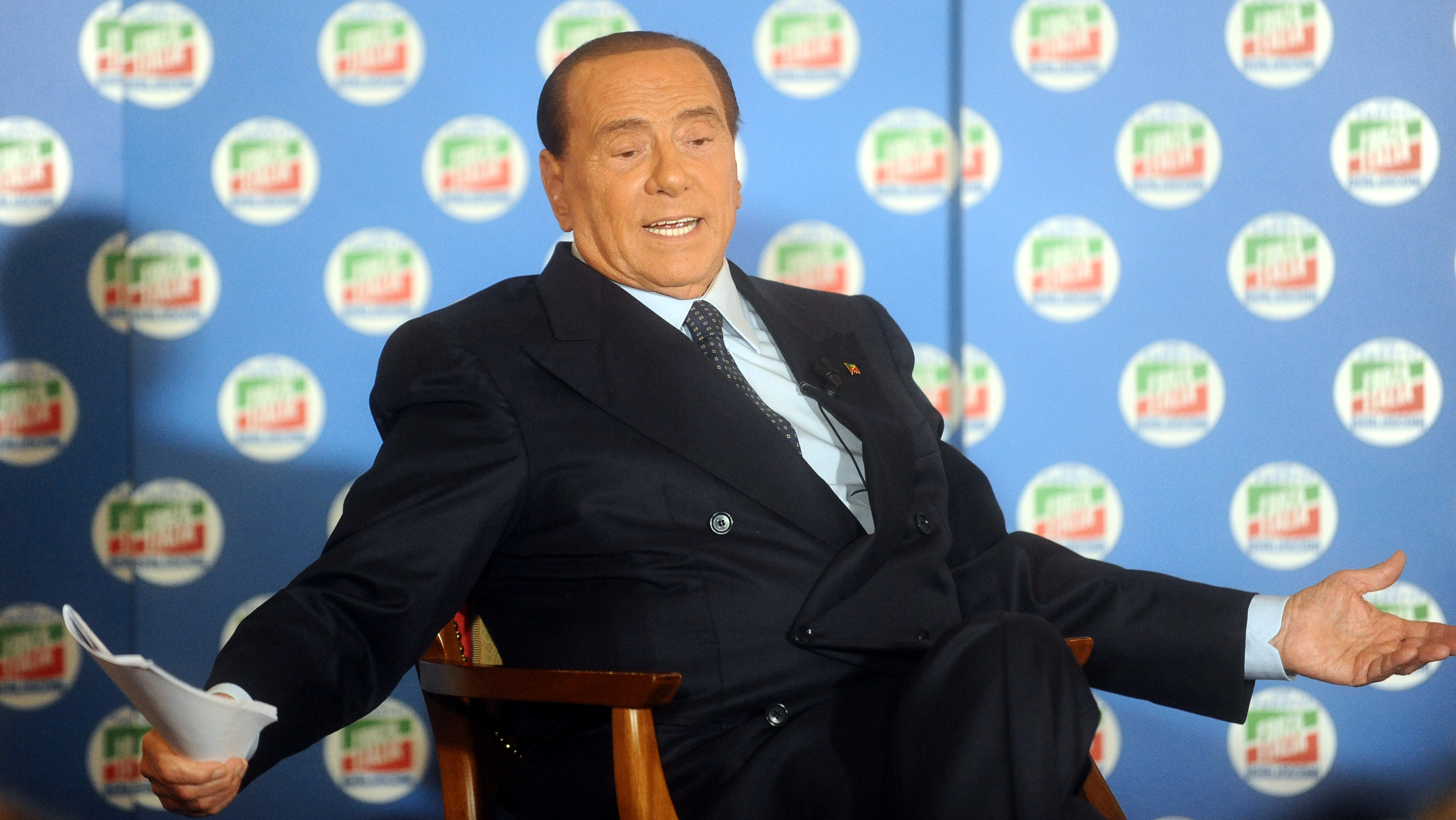
Berlusconi in Trento during the electoral campaign

The main proposal of the centre-right coalition was a tax reform based on the introduction of a flat tax; for Berlusconi, it was initially based on the lowest current rate (23%) with the threshold raised to €12,000, then proceeding to a gradual reduction of the rate, while according to Salvini the tax rate should be only 15%. The economic newspaper Il Sole 24 Ore estimated the cost of this measure at around €25 billion per year calculated with a 20% rate, or €40 billion with 15%. Berlusconi also proposed the cancellation of IRAP, a tax on productivity, plus increase of minimum pensions to €1,000, the introduction of a "dignity income" to fight poverty, the end of contribution on youth recruitment, changes to the Fornero Law, which regulated pensions, and the launch of a Marshall Plan for Africa to reduce illegal immigration to Italy. Within FI, there were some representatives of the Animalist Movement led by Michela Vittoria Brambilla, whose main focus was the banning of fur clothing and stricter controls in circuses, free veterinary care, and the establishment of an ombudsman for animal rights. The League proposed the complete replacement of the Fornero Law and the possibility of retirement with 41 years of contributions, the "scrapping" of tax records for taxpayers in difficulty, an operation that should yield up to €35 billion to the state, and the disbandment of Equitalia, the company that deals with the collection of taxes, plus the abolition of the limit on the use of cash and the regularization of prostitution; moreover, Salvini's main aim was a drastic reduction of illegal immigration by reintroducing border controls, blocking arrivals, and repatriating all migrants who have no right to stay in Italy. The FdI proposed free nurseries, a check for €400 per month for newborns up to the six years old to increase population growth, parental leave paid to 80% up to the sixth year of birth, increase in salaries and equipment to law enforcement, the increased use of the Italian Army as a measure to fight crime, and a new law on self-defense.

The M5S presented a programme whose main points are the introduction of a basic income, known as "income of citizenship", to fight poverty, a measure that would cost between €15 and €20 billion annually, plus the cut of the public debt by 40 points in relation to GDP in ten years, the adoption of measures to revitalise youth employment, a cut in pensions of over €5,000 net not entirely based on the contribution method, the reduction of IRPEF rates and the extension of the income tax threshold, the increase in spending on family welfare measures from 1.5 to 2.5% of GDP, and a constitutional law that obliges members of parliament to resign if they intend to change party. Di Maio also proposed a legislative simplification, starting with the elimination of almost 400 laws with a single legislative provision.

LeU focused on the so-called right to study, proposing in particular the abolition of tuition fees for students who take the exams regularly, with the estimated cost for the state budget of €1.6 billion. LeU also proposed the reintroducing the Workers' Statute, which offered protections that were eliminated by the Renzi government's Jobs Act, plus fighting tax evasion, corruption, and organised crime.

=== Macerata murder and subsequent attack ===
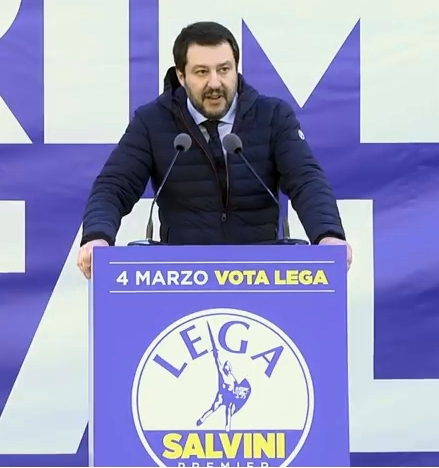
Salvini speaking at the final rally of his electoral campaign in Milan

On 3 February 2018, a drive-by shooting event occurred in the city of Macerata, Marche, in Central Italy, where six African migrants were seriously wounded. Luca Traini, a 28-year-old local man, was arrested and charged with attempted murder, and was also charged for the attack against the local headquarters of the ruling PD party. After the attack, Traini reportedly had an Italian flag draped on his shoulders and raised his arm in the fascist salute. Traini stated that the attack was "revenge" for Pamela Mastropietro, an 18-year-old Roman woman whose dismembered body had been found few days earlier, stuffed into two suitcases and dumped in the countryside; for this, three Nigerian drug dealers were arrested, the main suspect being Innocent Oseghale, a 29-year-old failed asylum seeker. Missing body parts had sparked allegations of the murder having been a muti killing also involving cannibalism.

The case sparked anger and anti-immigrant sentiment in Macerata. Traini's lawyer reported "alarming solidarity" for Traini expressed by the populace, while Mastropietro's mother publicly thanked Traini for "lighting a candle" for her daughter. A second autopsy of the girl's remains, published after the attack against the African migrants, revealed that Mastropietro had been strangled, stabbed, and then flayed while still alive. The murder of Mastropietro and the attack by Traini, and their appraisal by Italian media and the public were "set to become a decisive factor" in the national elections.

Traini was a member and former local candidate of the League, and many political commentators, intellectuals, and politicians criticized Salvini in connection with the attack, accusing him of having "spread hate and racism" in the country. Roberto Saviano, the notable anti-mafia writer, labeled Salvini as the "moral instigator" of Traini's attack. Salvini responded to critics by accusing the centre-left government of responsibility for Mastropietro's death through allowing migrants to stay in the country and having "blood on their hands", asserting that the blame lies with those who "fill [Italy] with illegal immigrants".

Prime Minister Gentiloni stated that he "trusts in the sense of responsibility of all political forces. Criminals are criminals and the state will be particularly harsh with anyone that wants to fuel a spiral of violence." Gentiloni added that "hate and violence will not divide Italy". Minister Minniti condemned the attack against the Africans, saying that any political party must "ride the hate". Renzi, whose party was also accused about its position on immigration, stated that "calm and responsibility" from all political forces would now be necessary. In the constituency of Macerata, the centre-right coalition, led by the League, won a plurality of the votes in the ballot, electing candidate Tullio Patassini, and showed an increase from 0.4% of the vote in 2013 to 21% in 2018, five years later.

=== Main parties' slogans ===
Party	Original slogan	English translation	Refs
Democratic Party	Avanti, insieme	"Forward, Together"	
Five Star Movement	Partecipa, Scegli, Cambia	"Participate, Choose, Change"	
Forza Italia	Onestà, Esperienza, Saggezza	"Honesty, Experience, Wisdom"	
League	Prima gli Italiani	"Italians First"	
Free and Equal	Per i molti, non per i pochi	"For the Many, Not the Few"	
Brothers of Italy	Il voto che unisce l'Italia	"The Vote that Unites Italy"	
More Europe	Più Europa, serve all'Italia	"More Europe, Italy Needs It"	
Together	Insieme è meglio	"Together Is Better"	
Popular Civic List	Il vaccino contro gli incompetenti	"The Vaccine Against the Incompetents"	
Power to the People	Potere al Popolo	"Power to the People"	
CasaPound	Vota più forte che puoi	"Vote As Strong As You Can"	

=== Electoral debates ===
Differently from many other Western world countries, electoral debates between parties' leaders are not so common before general elections in Italy; the last debate between the two main candidates to premiership dated back to the 2006 Italian general election between Silvio Berlusconi and Romano Prodi. With few exceptions, almost every main political leader had denied his participation to an electoral debate with other candidates, preferring interviews with TV hosts and journalists; however, many debates took places between other leading members of the main parties.

2018 Italian general election debates
Date	Organiser	Moderator	P Present NI Non-invitee A Absent invitee			
Date	Organiser	Moderator	Centre-left	Centre-right	M5S	LeU
7 November	La7 (Di Martedì)	Giovanni Floris	P Renzi	NI	A Di Maio	NI
12 December	Rai 3 (#cartabianca)	Bianca Berlinguer	P Martina	P Brunetta	NI	NI
16 January	Rai 3 (#cartabianca)	Bianca Berlinguer	P Orlando	P De Girolamo	NI	NI
30 January	Rai 3 (#cartabianca)	Bianca Berlinguer	P Emiliano	P Fedriga	NI	NI
13 February	La7 (Otto e mezzo)	Lilli Gruber	NI	P Salvini	NI	P Boldrini
13 February	Rai 3 (#cartabianca)	Bianca Berlinguer	P Lorenzin	NI	P Giarrusso	NI
27 February	Rai 3 (#cartabianca)	Bianca Berlinguer	NI	P De Girolamo	NI	P Speranza

== New electoral system ==
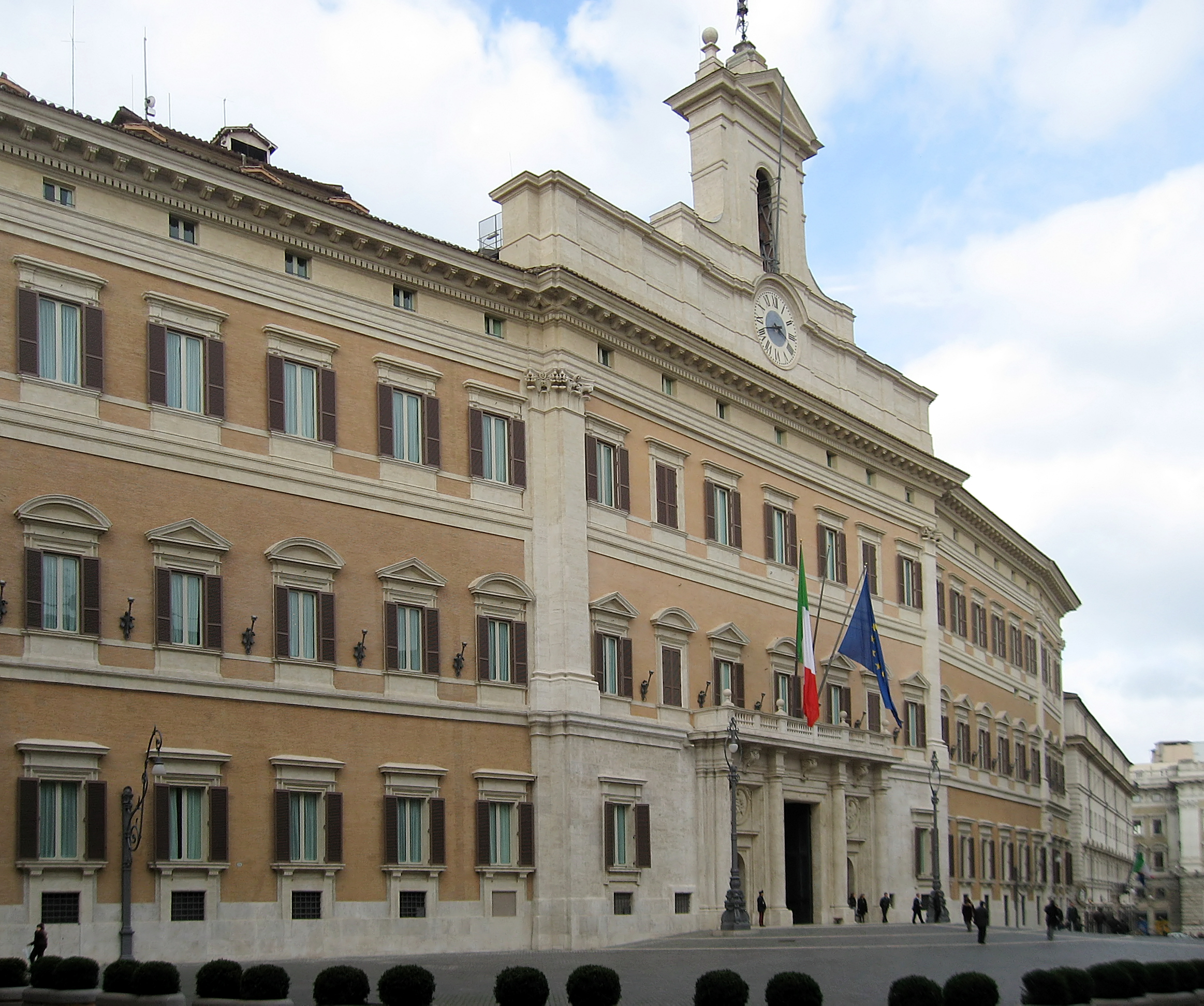
Palazzo Montecitorio, seat of the Chamber of Deputies

As a consequence of the 2016 Italian constitutional referendum and of two different rulings of the Constitutional Court of Italy, the electoral laws for the two houses of the Italian Parliament lacked uniformity. In October 2017, the PD, AP, FI, the League, and minor parties agreed on a new electoral law, which was approved by the Chamber of Deputies with 375 votes in favour and 215 against and by the Senate with 214 votes against 61; the reform was opposed by the M5S, the MDP, SI, FdI and minor parties.

The so-called Rosatellum bis, named after Ettore Rosato (PD leader in the Chamber of Deputies), is a mixed electoral system, with 37% of seats allocated using a first-past-the-post (FPTP) voting and 63% using the proportional largest remainder method, with one round of voting. The 630 deputies were to be elected as follows:

- 232 in single-member constituencies by plurality;
- 386 in multi-member constituencies by national proportional representation;
- 12 in multi-member abroad constituencies by constituency proportional representation.

The 315 elective senators were to be elected as follows:

- 116 in single-member constituencies by plurality;
- 193 in multi-member constituencies by regional proportional representation;
- 6 in multi-member abroad constituencies by constituency proportional representation.

A small, variable number of senators for life were to be members of the Senate.

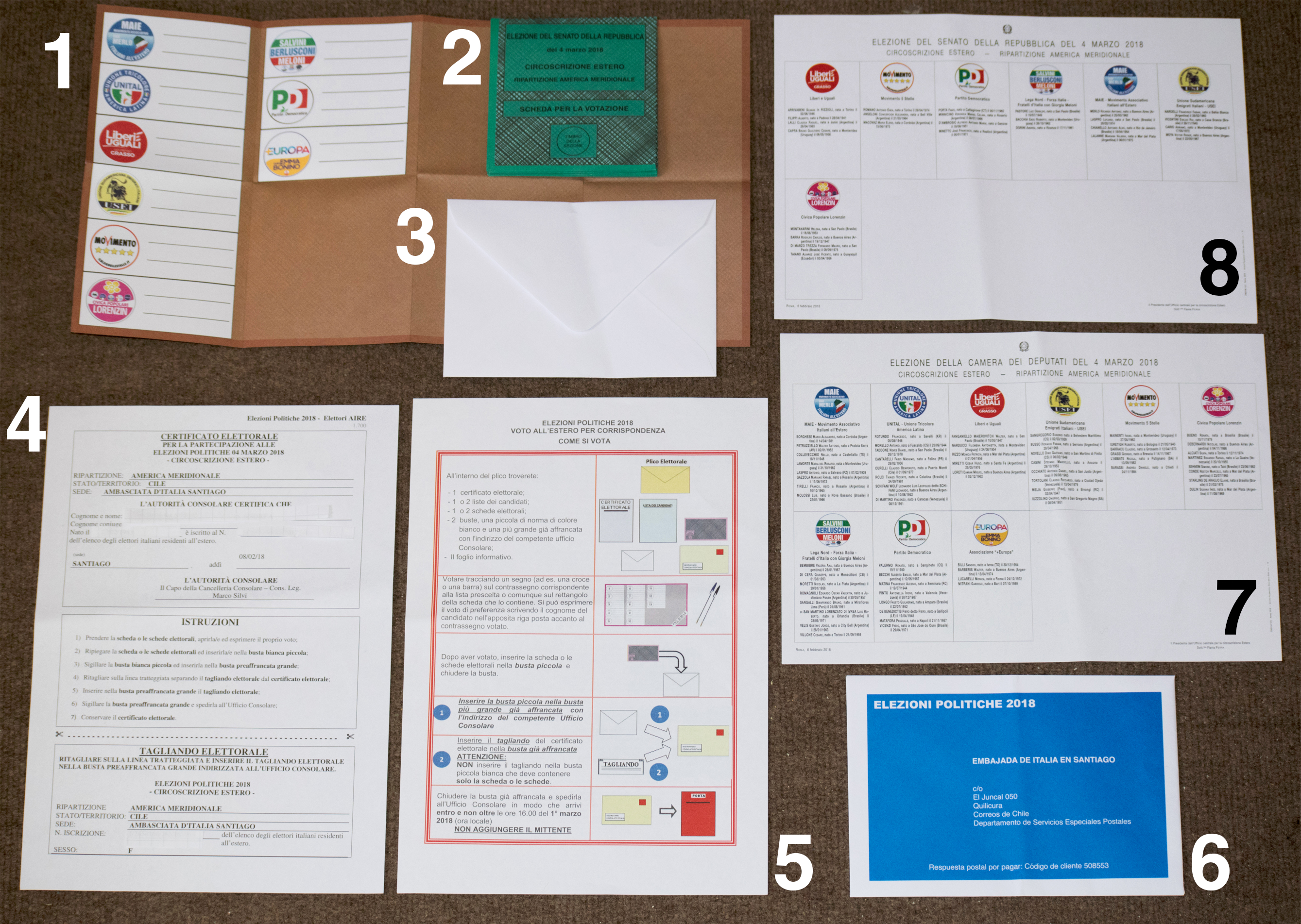
Electoral package sent to an Italian voter in South America

For Italian residents, each house members were to be elected in single ballots, including the constituency candidate and his/her supporting party lists. In each single-member constituency, the deputy or senator is elected on a plurality basis, while the seats in multi-member constituencies are allocated nationally. In order to be calculated in single-member constituency results, parties need to obtain at least 1% of the national vote. In order to receive seats in multi-member constituencies, parties need to obtain at least 3% of the national vote. Elects from multi-member constituencies would come from closed lists.

The voting paper, which is a single one for the first-past-the-post and the proportional systems, shows the names of the candidates to single-member constituencies and in close conjunction with them the symbols of the linked lists for the proportional part, each one with a list of the relative candidates. The voter was able to cast their vote in three different ways:

- Drawing a sign on the symbol of a list: in this case the vote extends to the candidate in the single-member constituency that is supported by that list.
- Drawing a sign on the name of the candidate of the single-member constituency and another one on the symbol of one list that supports them; the result is the same as that described above. Under penalty of annulmentit, the panachage is not allowed, so the voter cannot vote simultaneously for a candidate in the FPTP constituency and for a list which is not linked to them.
- Drawing a sign only on the name of the candidate for the FPTP constituency, without indicating any list. In this case, the vote is valid for the candidate in the single-member constituency and also automatically extended to the list that supports them; however, if that candidate is connected to several lists, the vote is divided proportionally between them, based on the votes that each one has obtained in that constituency.

== Coalitions and parties ==
=== Lists with parliamentary representation ===
Below are the main electoral lists that are running in the election.

Coalition	List	Main ideology	Leader	Contested constituencies		Seats in 2013			Seats in 2018		
Coalition	List	Main ideology	Leader	C	S	C	S	Total	C	S	Total
Centre-left coalition	Democratic Party (PD) (Note: Including the Moderates.)	Social democracy	Matteo Renzi	28	20	297	111	408	281	98	379
Centre-left coalition	Popular Civic List (CP) (Note: List composed of Popular Alternative (AP), Centrists for Europe (CpE), Italy of Values (IdV), Union for Trentino (UpT) and Italy Is Popular (IP).)	Christian democracy	Beatrice Lorenzin	28	20	—N/a	—N/a	—N/a	29	29	58
Centre-left coalition	Together (IEI) (Note: List composed of Italian Socialist Party (PSI), Federation of the Greens (FdV) and Civic Area (AC).)	Progressivism	Giulio Santagata	27	19	—N/a	—N/a	—N/a	6	3	9
Centre-left coalition	More Europe (+E) (Note: Including Italian Radicals (RI), Forza Europa (FE) and Democratic Centre (CD).)	Liberalism	Emma Bonino	28	20	6	0	6	6	1	7
Centre-right coalition	Forza Italia (FI) (Note: Including Pensioners' Party (PP), New Italian Socialist Party (NPSI) and Animalist Movement (MA).)	Liberal conservatism	Silvio Berlusconi	27	19	98	98	196	56	48	104
Centre-right coalition	Us with Italy – UDC (NcI–UDC) (Note: Including Direction Italy (DI), Civic Choice (SC), Act!, Cantiere Popolare (CP), the Movement for Autonomies (MpA), splinters from Popular Alternative, Identity and Action (IdeA) and New CDU.)	Christian democracy	Raffaele Fitto	28	20	—N/a	—N/a	—N/a	31	20	51
Centre-right coalition	League (Lega) (Note: Including National Movement for Sovereignty (MNS), Italian Liberal Party (PLI) and Sardinian Action Party (PSd'Az).)	Right-wing populism	Matteo Salvini	28	20	18	18	36	15	13	28
Centre-right coalition	Brothers of Italy (FdI)	National conservatism	Giorgia Meloni	27	19	9	0	9	12	3	15
Five Star Movement (M5S)		Populism	Luigi Di Maio	29	21	109	54	163	88	35	123
Free and Equal (LeU) (Note: List composed of Article One (Art.1), Italian Left (SI) and Possible (Pos).)		Social democracy	Pietro Grasso	28	20	37	7	44	46	19	65
Italian Republican Party – ALA (PRI–ALA)		Liberalism	Denis Verdini	13	11	—N/a	—N/a	—N/a	0	13	13
South Tyrolean People's Party – PATT (SVP–PATT)		Regionalism	Philipp Achammer	1	1	5	4	9	4	3	7

=== Lists without parliamentary representation ===
List	Main ideology	Leader	Contested constituencies	
List	Main ideology	Leader	C	S
Power to the People (PaP) (Note: List including Communist Refoundation Party (PRC), Italian Communist Party (PCI), Anticapitalist Left (SA), Party of the South (PdS), Risorgimento Socialista (RS) and Atheist Democracy (DA).)	Communism	Viola Carofalo	28	20
CasaPound (CPI)	Neo-fascism	Simone Di Stefano	28	20
The People of the Family (PdF)	Christian right	Mario Adinolfi	26	18
Italy for the Italians (IAI) (Note: List composed of New Force (FN) and Tricolour Flame (FT).)	Neo-fascism	Roberto Fiore	21	14
Human Value Party (PVU)	Humanism	Pasquale Ruga	18	12
Communist Party (PC)	Communism	Marco Rizzo	16	13
For a Revolutionary Left (PSR) (Note: List composed of Workers' Communist Party (PCL) and Left Class Revolution (SCR).)	Trotskyism	Claudio Bellotti	13	10
10 Times Better (10VM)	Liberalism	Andrea Dusi	14	—N/a
People's List for the Constitution (LdP)	Left-wing populism	Antonio Ingroia	9	7
National Bloc for Freedoms (BNL) (Note: List composed of Royal Italy (IR) and Christian Democracy (DC).)	Monarchism	Massimo Mallucci	5	—N/a
Great North (GN)	Regionalism	Marco Reguzzoni	4	2
Autodeterminatzione (Note: List composed of Red Moors (RM), Sardos, Comunidades, Independence Republic of Sardinia (iRS), Sardigna Natzione Indipendentzia (SNI), Liberu, Possible Sardinia and Gentes.)	Autonomism	Anthony Muroni	1	1
Pact for Autonomy (PpA)	Autonomism	Massimo Moretuzzo	1	1

== Opinion polling ==
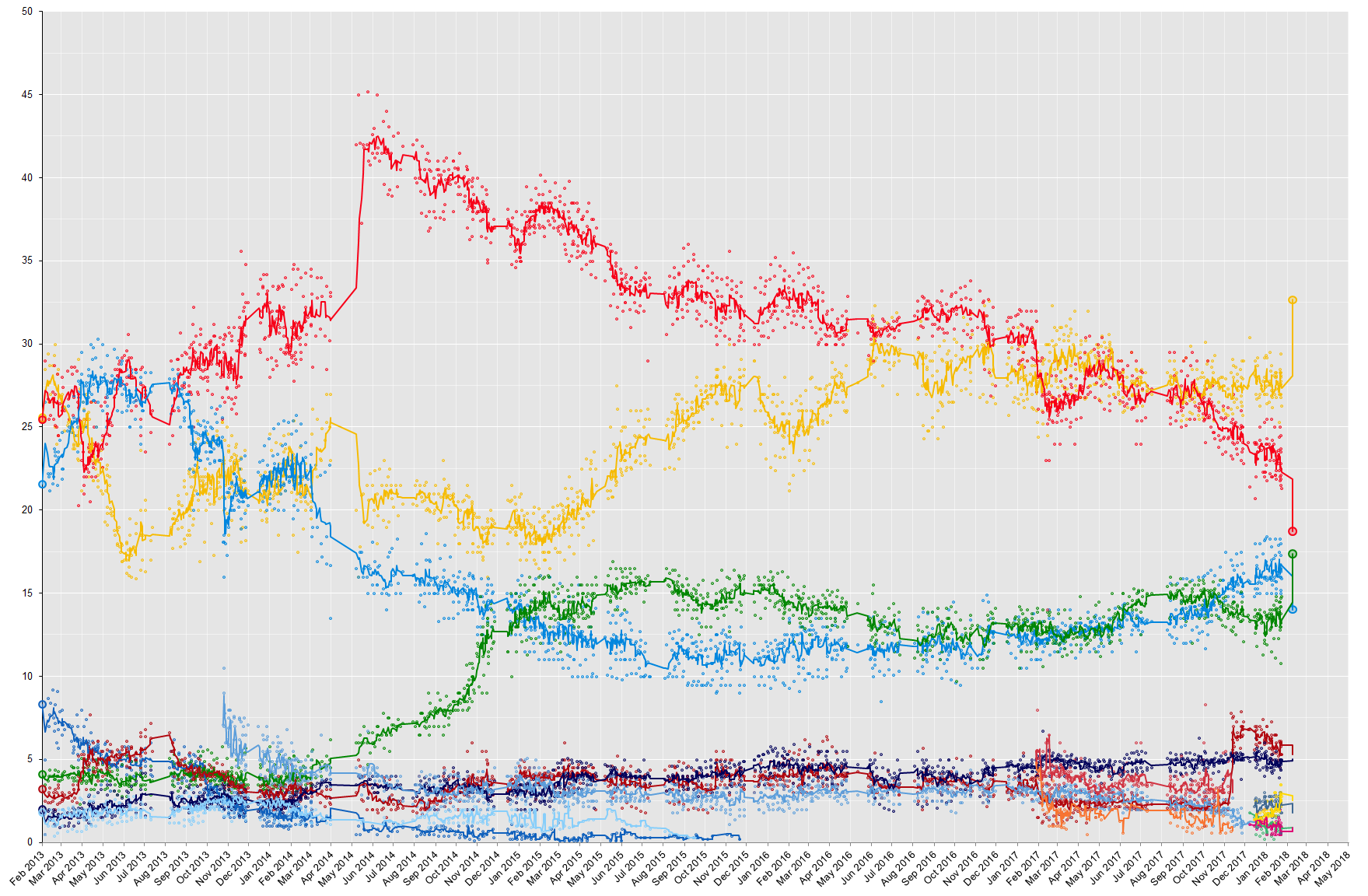
Six-point average trend line of poll results from 25 February 2013 to election day, with each line corresponding to a political party PD M5S PdL/FI NCD/AP SC LN SEL/SI FdI UDC

== Voter turnout ==
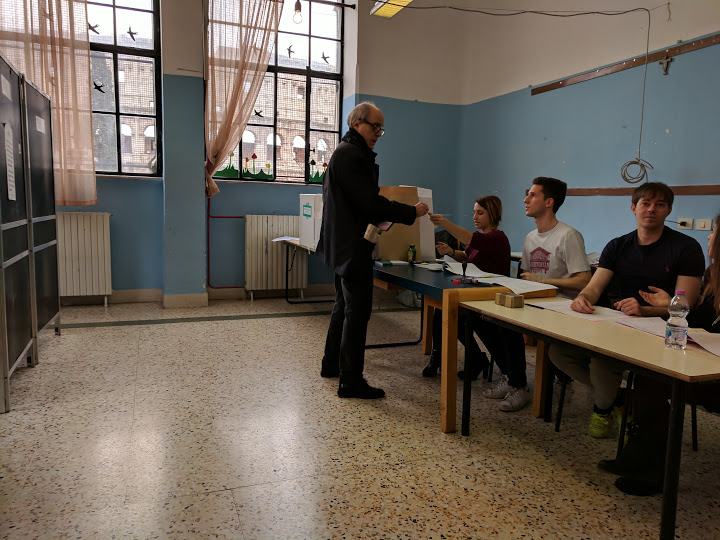
Voting at a polling station in Rome

Region	Time		
Region	12:00	19:00	23:00
Abruzzo	19.38%	61.29%	75.25%
Aosta Valley	21.24%	59.01%	72.27%
Apulia	17.97%	53.68%	68.94%
Basilicata	16.27%	53.12%	71.11%
Calabria	15.11%	49.55%	63.78%
Campania	16.96%	52.59%	68.20%
Emilia-Romagna	22.72%	65.99%	78.26%
Friuli-Venezia Giulia	22.56%	62.45%	75.11%
Lazio	18.88%	55.47%	72.58%
Liguria	21.78%	61.04%	71.96%
Lombardy	20.92%	62.29%	76.81%
Marche	19.81%	62.22%	77.28%
Molise	17.88%	56.46%	71.76%
Piedmont	20.44%	61.88%	75.17%
Sardinia	18.34%	52.49%	65.39%
Sicily	14.27%	47.06%	62.72%
Tuscany	21.17%	63.87%	77.34%
Trentino-Alto Adige	20.85%	60.57%	74.34%
Umbria	20.55%	64.86%	78.22%
Veneto	22.24%	64.61%	78.72%
Total	19.43%	58.42%	72.94%
Source: Ministry of the Interior

== Results ==
The centre-right coalition emerged with a plurality of seats in the Chamber of Deputies and in the Senate, while the anti-establishment Five Star Movement became the party with the largest number of votes. The centre-left coalition came third. As no political group or party won an outright majority, the election resulted in a hung parliament.

=== Chamber of Deputies ===
==== Overall results ====
← Summary of the 4 March 2018 Chamber of Deputies election results →
Coalition	Party	Proportional			First-past-the-post			Overseas			Total seats	+/−
Coalition	Party	Votes	%	Seats	Votes	%	Seats	Votes	%	Seats	Total seats	+/−
Centre-right coalition	League	5,698,687	17.35	73	12,152,345	37.00	49	240,072	21.43	2	125	+109
Centre-right coalition	Forza Italia	4,596,956	14.00	59	12,152,345	37.00	46	240,072	21.43	1	104	+1
Centre-right coalition	Brothers of Italy	1,429,550	4.35	19	12,152,345	37.00	12	240,072	21.43	0	32	+25
Centre-right coalition	Us with Italy–UDC	427,152	1.30	0	12,152,345	37.00	4	11,845	1.09	0	4	New
Centre-right coalition	Total seats			151			111			3	265	+140
Five Star Movement		10,732,066	32.68	133	10,732,066	32.68	93	197,346	17.57	1	227	+119
Centre-left coalition	Democratic Party	6,161,896	18.76	86	7,506,723	22.85	21	297,153	26.45	5	112	−180
Centre-left coalition	More Europe	841,468	2.56	0	7,506,723	22.85	2	64,350	5.73	1	3	New
Centre-left coalition	Together	190,601	0.58	0	7,506,723	22.85	1	—N/a	—N/a	0	1	New
Centre-left coalition	Popular Civic List	178,107	0.54	0	7,506,723	22.85	2	32.071	2.85	0	2	New
Centre-left coalition	SVP–PATT	134,651	0.41	2	7,506,723	22.85	2	—N/a	—N/a	0	4	−1
Centre-left coalition	Total seats			88			28			6	122	-223
Free and Equal		1,114,799	3.38	14	1,114,799	3.39	0	64,523	5.74	0	14	New
Associative Movement of Italians Abroad		—N/a	—N/a	0	—N/a	—N/a	0	107,236	9.55	1	1	−1
South American Union of Italian Emigrants		—N/a	—N/a	0	—N/a	—N/a	0	68,291	6.08	1	1	–
Total											630	–

Popular vote (party)
M5S	32.68%
PD	18.76%
Lega	17.35%
FI	14.00%
FdI	4.35%
LeU	3.39%
+E	2.56%
NcI	1.30%
PaP	1.13%
Others	4.48%

Seat distribution (party)
M5S	36.03%
Lega	19.84%
PD	17.78%
FI	16.51%
FdI	5.07%
LeU	2.22%
Others	2.55%

Popular vote (coalition)
CDX	37.00%
M5S	32.68%
CSX	22.86%
LeU	3.39%
PaP	1.13%
Others	2.96%

Seat distribution (coalition)
CDX	42.06%
M5S	36.03%
CSX	19.36%
LeU	2.22%
Others	0.33%

==== Proportional results ====
Parties with the most votes in constituencies for the Chamber of Deputies

Party	Votes	%	Seats
Five Star Movement (M5S)	10,732,066	32.68	133
Democratic Party (PD)	6,161,896	18.76	86
League (Lega)	5,698,687	17.35	73
Forza Italia (FI)	4,596,956	14.00	59
Brothers of Italy (FdI)	1,429,550	4.35	19
Free and Equal (LeU)	1,114,799	3.39	14
More Europe (+E)	841,468	2.56	0
Us with Italy – UDC (NcI–UDC)	427,152	1.30	0
Power to the People (PaP)	372,179	1.13	0
CasaPound (CPI)	312,432	0.95	0
The People of the Family (PdF)	219,633	0.67	0
Together (IEI)	190,601	0.58	0
Popular Civic List (CP)	178,107	0.54	0
South Tyrolean People's Party – PATT (SVP–PATT)	134,651	0.41	2
Italy for the Italians (IAI)	126,543	0.39	0
Communist Party (PC)	106,816	0.33	0
Human Value Party (PVU)	47,953	0.15	0
10 Times Better (10VM)	37,354	0.11	0
For a Revolutionary Left (PSR)	29,364	0.09	0
Italian Republican Party – ALA (PRI–ALA)	20,943	0.06	0
Great North (GN)	19,846	0.06	0
Autodeterminatzione	19,307	0.06	0
People's List for the Constitution (LdP)	9,921	0.03	0
Pact for Autonomy (PpA)	7,079	0.02	0
National Bloc for Freedoms (BNL)	3,628	0.01	0
SìAmo	1,428	0.00	0
Renaissance – MIR	772	0.00	0
Italy in the Heart	574	0.00	0
Total	32,841,705	100.00	386
Invalid / blank / unassigned votes	1,471,727	4.33	–
Total turnout	33,923,321	72.94	–
Registered voters	46,505,499	–	–
Source: Ministry of the Interior

==== First-past-the-post results ====
Winning candidates in constituencies for the Chamber of Deputies

Party or coalition	Votes	%	Seats
Centre-right coalition (CDX)	12,152,345	37.00	111
Five Star Movement (M5S)	10,727,567	32.68	93
Centre-left coalition (CSX)	7,506,723	22.85	28
Free and Equal (LeU)	1,114,799	3.39	0
Power to the People (PaP)	372,179	1.13	0
CasaPound (CPI)	312,432	0.95	0
The People of the Family (PdF)	219,633	0.67	0
Italy for the Italians (IAI)	126,543	0.39	0
Communist Party (PC)	106,816	0.33	0
Human Value Party (PVU)	47,953	0.15	0
10 Times Better (10VM)	37,354	0.11	0
For a Revolutionary Left (PSR)	29,364	0.09	0
Italian Republican Party – ALA (PRI–ALA)	20,943	0.06	0
Great North (GN)	19,846	0.06	0
Autodeterminatzione	19,307	0.06	0
People's List for the Constitution (LdP)	9,921	0.03	0
Pact for Autonomy (PpA)	7,079	0.02	0
National Bloc for Freedoms (BNL)	3,628	0.01	0
SìAmo	1,428	0.00	0
Renaissance – MIR	686	0.00	0
Italy in the Heart	574	0.00	0
Total	32,841,025	100.00	231
Invalid / blank / unassigned votes	1,471,727	4.33	–
Total turnout	33,923,321	72.94	–
Registered voters	46,505,499	–	–
Source: Ministry of the Interior

==== Aosta Valley ====
The autonomous region of Aosta Valley, in northwestern Italy, elects one member to the Chamber of Deputies through a direct first-past-the-post election. Some parties that formed electoral coalitions in Italy, might have opted to run against one another (or form different coalitions) in this particular region.

Party/coalition	Candidate	Votes	%
Five Star Movement	Elisa Tripodi	15,999	24.1
Aosta Valley	Alessia Favre	14,492	21.7
For All	Giampaolo Marcoz	12,118	18.3
League	Luca Distort	11,588	17.5
Forza Italia–FdI–NVdA	Edoardo Melgara	5,533	8.3
Other candidates		6,703	10.1
Total		66,370	100.0

Source: "Eligendo: Camera [Scrutini] Collegio uninominale VALLE D'AOSTA - 01 (Italia) - Camera dei Deputati del 4 marzo 2018". Ministero dell'Interno (in Italian). Archived from the original on 3 April 2018.

==== Overseas constituencies ====
Twelve members of the Chamber of Deputies are elected by Italians abroad. Two members are elected for North America and Central America (including most of the Caribbean), four members for South America (including Trinidad and Tobago), five members for Europe, and one member for the rest of the world (Africa, Asia, Oceania, and Antarctica). Voters in these regions select candidate lists and cast a preference vote for individual candidates. The seats are allocated by proportional representation. The electoral law allows for parties to form different coalitions on the lists abroad, compared to the lists in Italy; Forza Italia, the League, and Brothers of Italy formed a unified list for abroad constituencies.

Party or coalition	Votes	%	Seats
Democratic Party (PD)	297,153	26.45	5
League – Forza Italia – Brothers of Italy (Lega–FI–FdI)	240,702	21.43	3
Five Star Movement (M5S)	197,346	17.57	1
Associative Movement of Italians Abroad (MAIE)	107,236	9.55	1
South American Union of Italian Emigrants (USEI)	68,291	6.08	1
Free and Equal (LeU)	64,523	5.74	0
More Europe (+E)	64,350	5.73	1
Popular Civic List (CP)	32,071	2.85	0
Latin America Tricolor Union (UniTAL)	25,555	2.27	0
Us with Italy – UDC (NcI–UDC)	12,396	1.10	0
Freedom Movement	10,590	0.94	0
Italian Republican Party – ALA (PRI–ALA)	2,270	0.20	0
Free Flights to Italy	946	0.08	0
Total	1,123,429	100.00	12
Invalid / blank / unassigned votes	156,755	12.42	–
Total turnout	1,262,422	29.84	–
Registered voters	4,230,854	–	–
Source: Ministry of the Interior

=== Senate of the Republic ===
==== Overall results ====
← Summary of the 4 March 2018 Senate of the Republic election results →
Coalition	Party	Proportional			First-past-the-post			Overseas			Total seats	+/−
Coalition	Party	Votes	%	Seats	Votes	%	Seats	Votes	%	Seats	Total seats	+/−
Centre-right coalition	League	5,321,537	17.61	37	11,327,549	37.50	21	226,885	21.98	0	58	+39
Centre-right coalition	Forza Italia	4,358,004	14.43	33	11,327,549	37.50	23	226,885	21.98	2	57	–41
Centre-right coalition	Brothers of Italy	1,286,606	4.26	7	11,327,549	37.50	9	226,885	21.98	0	18	+18
Centre-right coalition	Us with Italy–UDC	361,402	1.20	0	11,327,549	37.50	4	10,404	1.04	0	4	New
Centre-right coalition	Total seats			77			58			2	137	+20
Five Star Movement		9,733,928	32.22	68	9,733,928	32.22	44	174,948	17.64	0	112	+58
Centre-left coalition	Democratic Party	5,783,360	19.14	43	6,947,199	23.00	8	279,489	27.08	2	53	–57
Centre-left coalition	More Europe	714,821	2.37	0	6,947,199	23.00	1	55,625	5.39	0	1	New
Centre-left coalition	Together	163,454	0.54	0	6,947,199	23.00	1	—N/a	—N/a	—N/a	1	New
Centre-left coalition	Popular Civic List	157,282	0.52	0	6,947,199	23.00	1	31,293	3.15	0	1	New
Centre-left coalition	SVP–PATT	128,282	0.42	1	6,947,199	23.00	2	—N/a	—N/a	—N/a	3	–1
Centre-left coalition	Aosta Valley	—N/a	—N/a	—N/a	6,947,199	23.00	1	—N/a	—N/a	—N/a	1	±0
Centre-left coalition	Total seats			44			14			2	60	-63
Free and Equal		991,159	3.28	4	991,159	3.28	0	55,279	5.57	0	4	New
Associative Movement of Italians Abroad		—N/a	—N/a	0	—N/a	—N/a	0	110,879	10.74	1	1	–
South American Union of Italian Emigrants		—N/a	—N/a	0	—N/a	—N/a	0	68,233	6.61	1	1	–
Total											315	–

Popular vote (party)
M5S	32.22%
PD	19.14%
Lega	17.61%
FI	14.43%
FdI	4.26%
LeU	3.28%
+E	2.37%
NcI	1.20%
PaP	1.06%
Others	4.43%

Seat distribution (party)
M5S	35.56%
Lega	18.41%
FI	18.09%
PD	16.83%
FdI	5.71%
LeU	1.27%
NcI	1.27%
Others	2.86%

Popular vote (coalition)
CDX	37.50%
M5S	32.22%
CSX	23.00%
LeU	3.28%
Others	4.00%

Seat distribution (coalition)
CDX	42.86%
M5S	35.56%
CSX	18.41%
LeU	1.27%
Others	1.90%

==== Proportional results ====
Parties with the most votes in constituencies for the Senate of the Republic

Party	Votes	%	Seats
Five Star Movement (M5S)	9,733,928	32.22	68
Democratic Party (PD)	5,783,360	19.14	43
League (Lega)	5,321,537	17.61	37
Forza Italia (FI)	4,358,004	14.43	33
Brothers of Italy (FdI)	1,286,606	4.26	7
Free and Equal (LeU)	991,159	3.28	4
More Europe (+E)	714,821	2.37	0
Us with Italy – UDC (NcI–UDC)	361,402	1.20	0
Power to the People (PaP)	320,493	1.06	0
CasaPound (CPI)	259,718	0.86	0
The People of the Family (PdF)	211,759	0.70	0
Together (IEI)	163,454	0.54	0
Popular Civic List (CP)	157,282	0.52	0
Italy for the Italians (IAI)	149,907	0.50	0
South Tyrolean People's Party – PATT (SVP–PATT)	128,282	0.42	1
Communist Party (PC)	101,648	0.34	0
Human Value Party (PVU)	38,749	0.12	0
For a Revolutionary Left (PSR)	32,623	0.11	0
Italian Republican Party – ALA (PRI–ALA)	27,384	0.09	0
Autodeterminatzione	20,468	0.07	0
Great North (GN)	17,507	0.06	0
People's List for the Constitution (LdP)	10,356	0.03	0
United Right – Pitchforks	6,229	0.02	0
Christian Democracy (DC)	5,532	0.02	0
Pact for Autonomy (PpA)	5,015	0.02	0
SìAmo	1,402	0.00	0
Modern and Solidary State (SMS)	1,384	0.00	0
Renaissance – MIR	552	0.00	0
Total	30,210,561	100.00	193
Invalid / blank / unassigned votes	1,398,216	4.48	–
Total turnout	31,231,814	73.01	–
Registered voters	42,780,033	–	–
Source: Ministry of the Interior

==== First-past-the-post results ====
Winning candidates in constituencies for the Senate of the Republic

Party or coalition	Votes	%	Seats
Centre-right coalition (CDX)	11,327,549	37.50	58
Five Star Movement (M5S)	9,733,928	32.22	44
Centre-left coalition (CSX)	6,947,199	23.00	14
Free and Equal (LeU)	991,159	3.28	0
Power to the People (PaP)	320,493	1.06	0
CasaPound (CPI)	259,718	0.86	0
The People of the Family (PdF)	211,759	0.70	0
Italy for the Italians (IAI)	149,907	0.50	0
Communist Party (PC)	101,648	0.34	0
Human Value Party (PVU)	38,749	0.12	0
For a Revolutionary Left (PSR)	32,623	0.11	0
Italian Republican Party–ALA (PRI–ALA)	27,384	0.09	0
Autodeterminatzione	20,468	0.07	0
Great North (GN)	17,507	0.06	0
People's List for the Constitution (LdP)	10,356	0.03	0
United Right – Pitchforks	6,229	0.02	0
Christian Democracy (DC)	5,532	0.02	0
Pact for Autonomy (PpA)	5,015	0.02	0
SìAmo	1,402	0.00	0
Modern and Solidary State (SMS)	1,384	0.00	0
Renaissance – MIR	354	0.00	0
Total	30,210,363	100.00	116
Invalid / blank / unassigned votes	1,398,216	4.48	–
Total turnout	31,231,814	73.01	–
Registered voters	42,780,033	–	–
Source: Ministry of the Interior

==== Aosta Valley ====
Party/coalition	Candidate	Votes	%
Aosta Valley	Albert Lanièce	15,958	25.8
Five Star Movement	Luciano Mossa	14,398	23.2
League	Paolo Sammaritani	11,004	17.8
For All	Luisa Trione	9,659	15.6
Forza Italia–FdI–NVdA	Orlando Navarra	5,223	8.4
Other candidates		5,696	9.2
Total		61,938	100.0

Source: "Eligendo: Senato [Scrutini] Collegio uninominale VALLE D'AOSTA - 01 (Italia) - Senato della Repubblica del 4 marzo 2018". Ministero dell'Interno (in Italian).

==== Overseas constituencies ====
Party or coalition	Votes	%	Seats
Democratic Party (PD)	279,489	27.08	2
League – Forza Italia – Brothers of Italy (Lega–FI–FdI)	226,885	21.98	2
Five Star Movement (M5S)	182,715	17.70	0
Associative Movement of Italians Abroad (MAIE)	110,879	10.74	1
South American Union of Italian Emigrants (USEI)	68,233	6.61	1
Free and Equal (LeU)	57,761	5.60	0
More Europe (+E)	55,625	5.39	0
Popular Civic List (CP)	32,660	3.16	0
Us with Italy–UDC (NcI–UDC)	10,856	1.05	0
Freedom Movement	6,960	0.67	0
Total	1,032,063	100.00	6
Invalid / blank / unassigned votes	146,430	12.61	–
Total turnout	1,160,985	30.27	–
Registered voters	4,230,854	–	–
Source: Ministry of the Interior

=== Analysis of proportionality ===
Using the Gallagher index, the disproportionality of the Chamber of Deputies in the election was 5.50, while for the Senate of the Republic it was 6.12.

Chamber of Deputies
Coalition	Vote share	Seat share	Difference	Difference²
Centre-right coalition	37.00	42.06	+5.06	25.60
Five Star Movement	32.68	36.03	+3.35	11.22
Centre-left coalition	22.85	19.36	−3.49	12.18
Free and Equal	3.39	2.22	−1.17	1.37
Power to the People	1.13	0.00	−1.13	1.28
Others	2.97	0.00	−2.97	8.82
			TOTAL	60.47
			TOTAL /2	30.24
			√TOTAL /2	5.50

Senate of the Republic
Coalition	Vote share	Seat share	Difference	Difference²
Centre-right coalition	37.49	42.86	+5.37	28.84
Five Star Movement	32.22	35.56	+3.34	11.16
Centre-left coalition	22.99	18.41	−4.58	20.98
Free and Equal	3.28	1.27	−2.01	4.04
Power to the People	1.05	0.00	−1.05	1.10
Others	2.97	0.00	−2.97	8.82
			TOTAL	74.93
			TOTAL /2	37.47
			√TOTAL /2	6.12

=== Electorate demographics ===
Sociology of the electorate
Demographic	Centre-right	M5S	Centre-left	LeU	Others	Turnout
Total vote	37.0%	32.7%	22.9%	3.4%	4.0%	72.9%
Sex
Men	36.8%	32.8%	22.9%	3.5%	4.0%	72.5%
Women	37.1%	32.9%	22.9%	2.7%	3.7%	68.3%
Age
18–34 years old	34.4%	35.3%	21.5%	5.0%	3.8%	70.1%
35–49 years old	37.4%	35.4%	20.3%	2.7%	4.2%	72.2%
50–64 years old	38.3%	34.0%	20.1%	3.2%	4.4%	72.4%
65 or older	36.9%	27.1%	30.1%	3.0%	2.9%	66.3%
Occupation
Student	29.9%	32.3%	24.4%	8.2%	5.2%	66.8%
Unemployed	41.8%	37.2%	15.1%	0.6%	5.3%	63.7%
Housewife	41.1%	36.1%	17.4%	1.8%	3.6%	65.9%
Blue-collar	42.6%	37.0%	14.1%	1.3%	5.0%	72.0%
White-collar	29.4%	36.1%	25.4%	5.6%	3.5%	75.6%
Self-employed	46.9%	31.8%	15.1%	2.3%	3.9%	73.3%
Manager	31.8%	31.2%	29.5%	3.3%	4.2%	77.9%
Retired	36.6%	26.4%	30.5%	3.7%	2.8%	68.8%
Work sector
Public sector	29.7%	41.6%	24.0%	1.7%	3.9%	71.8%
Private sector	35.6%	34.0%	22.0%	4.3%	4.1%	72.7%
Education
Elementary school	36.1%	30.0%	28.5%	2.3%	3.1%	64.9%
Middle school	42.7%	33.3%	18.4%	2.2%	3.4%	70.5%
High school	34.9%	36.1%	20.3%	4.7%	4.0%	74.1%
University	28.8%	29.3%	31.4%	5.5%	5.0%	72.0%
Religious service attendance
Weekly or more	38.2%	30.9%	26.0%	2.2%	2.7%	68.9%
Monthly	44.6%	31.4%	18.5%	2.6%	2.9%	72.0%
Occasionally	38.6%	34.9%	20.0%	3.2%	3.3%	71.2%
Never	30.8%	33.7%	24.8%	5.2%	5.5%	69.9%
Source: Ipsos Italia

== Government formation ==
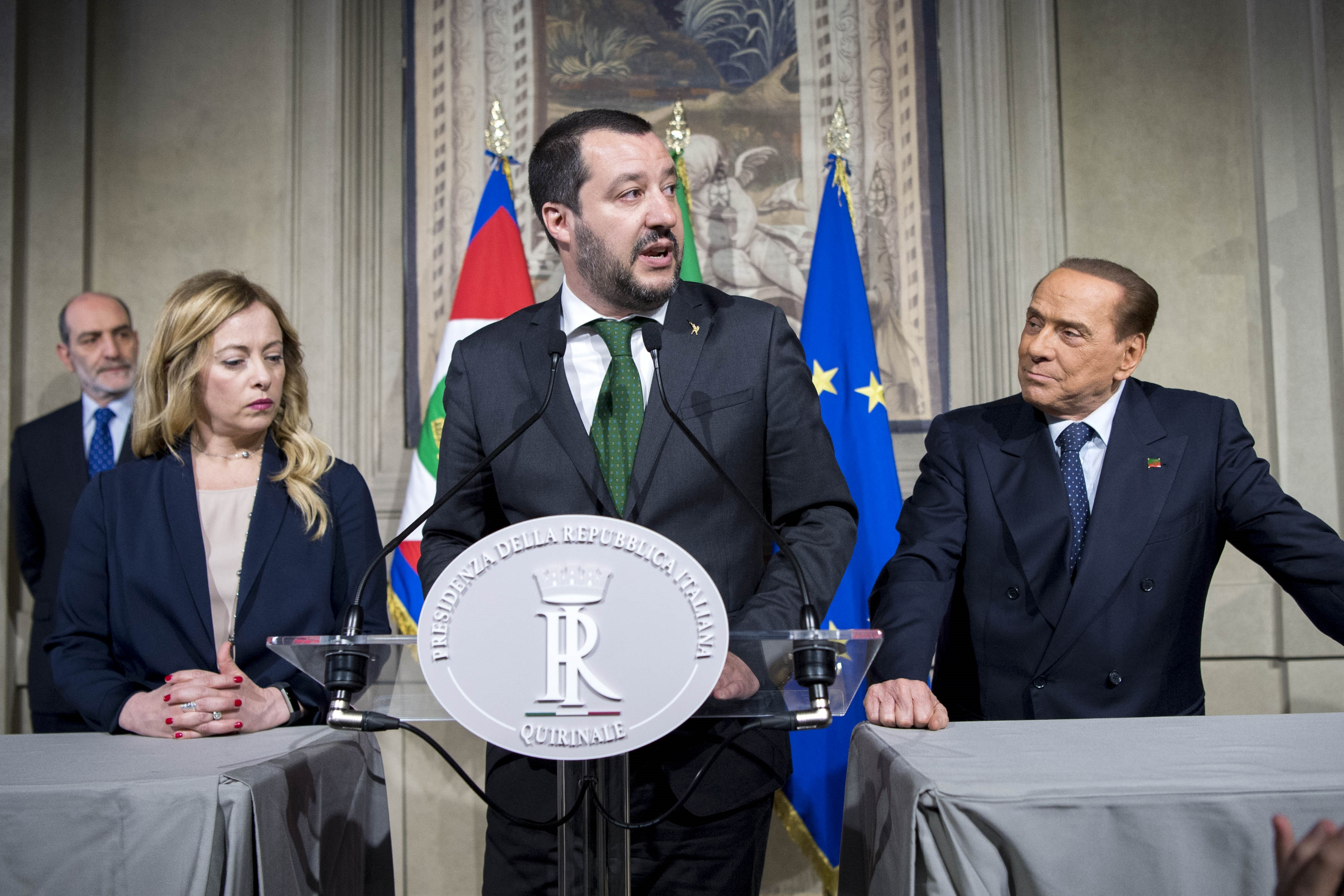
Centre-right's delegation at the Quirinal Palace (Matteo Salvini with Giorgia Meloni and Silvio Berlusconi)

After the election's results were known, both Luigi Di Maio and Matteo Salvini stated that they must receive from President Sergio Mattarella the task of forming a new cabinet because they led the largest party and the largest coalition, respectively. On 5 March, Matteo Renzi announced that the Democratic Party (PD) would be in the opposition during this legislature and he would resign as party leader when a new cabinet is formed. On 6 March, Salvini repeated his campaign message that his party would refuse any coalition with the Five Star Movement (M5S). On 14 March, Salvini offered to govern with the M5S, imposing the condition that the League ally Forza Italia, led by the former prime minister Silvio Berlusconi, must also take part in any coalition. Di Maio rejected this proposal on the grounds that Salvini was "choosing restoration instead of revolution" because "Berlusconi represents the past".

On 12 March, Renzi resigned as party leader and was replaced by deputy secretary Maurizio Martina. On 24 March, the centre-right coalition and the M5S agreed on the election of presidents of the houses of parliament, Roberto Fico of the M5S for the Chamber of Deputies and Maria Elisabetta Alberti Casellati of FI for the Senate of the Republic.

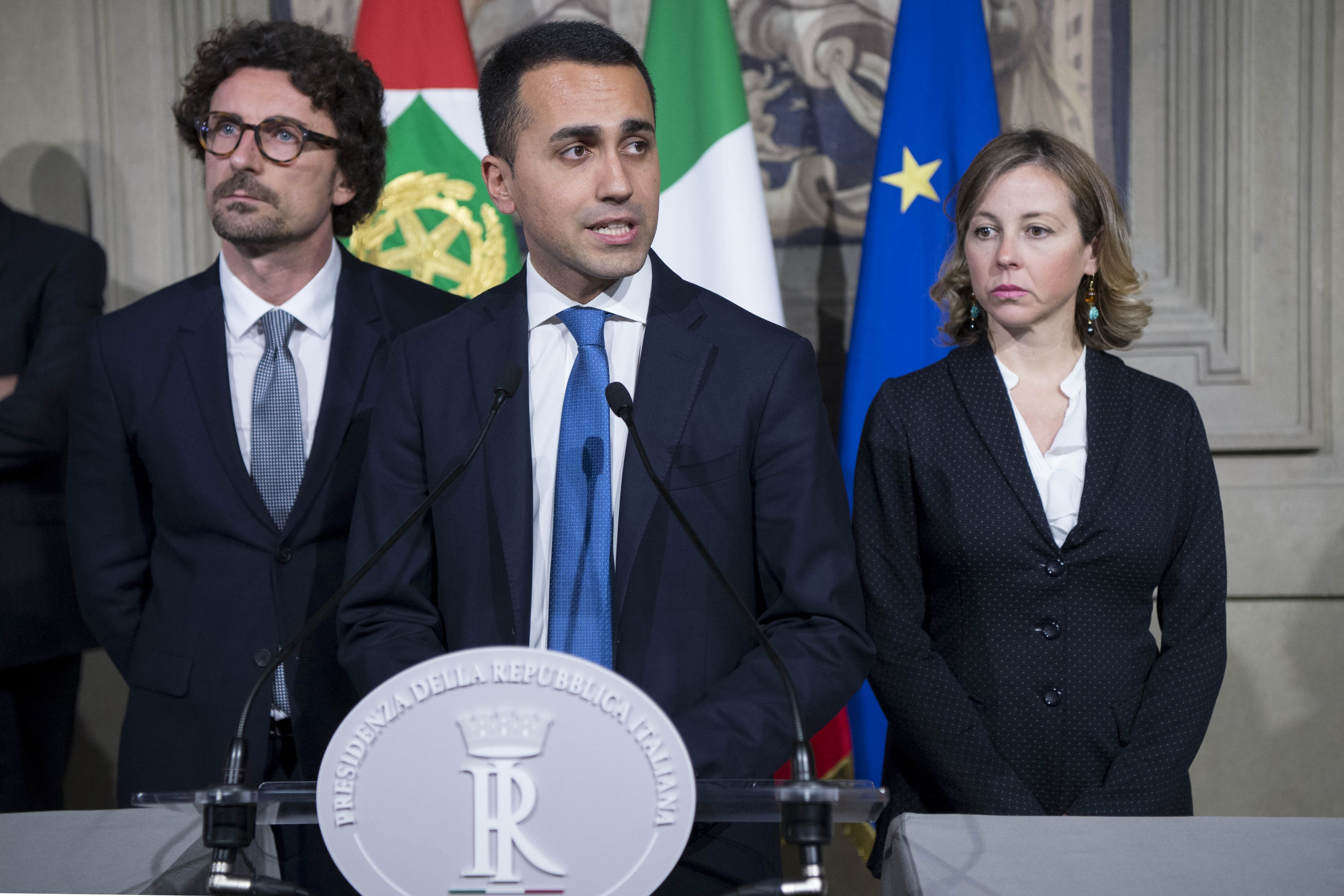
Five Star Movement's delegation at the Quirinal Palace (Luigi Di Maio with Danilo Toninelli and Giulia Grillo)

On 7 April, Di Maio made an appeal to the PD to "bury the hatchet" and consider a governing coalition with the M5S. On 18 April, President Sergio Mattarella gave newly-elected Senate president Casellati a so-called "exploratory mandate" to form a government of M5S and the centre-right coalition, with a two-day deadline. On 23 April, President Mattarella gave newly-elected Chamber of Deputies president Fico an "exploratory mandate" to form a government between M5S and the PD, with a three-day deadline. The decision came after the previous attempt by Casellati failed to show any progress. On 30 April, following an interview of Renzi, who expressed his strong opposition to an alliance with the M5S, Di Maio called for new elections.

On 7 May, President Mattarella held a third round of government formation talks, after which he formally confirmed the lack of any possible majority (the M5S rejecting an alliance with the whole centre-right coalition, the PD rejecting an alliance with both the M5S and the centre-right coalition, and the League's Salvini refusing to start a government with the M5S without Berlusconi's FI, whose presence in the government was explicitly vetoed by M5S's Di Maio); on the same circumstance, he announced his intention to soon appoint a "neutral government" (irrespective of the M5S and the League's refusal to support such an option) to take over from the Gentiloni Cabinet, which was considered unable to lead Italy into a second consecutive election, as it was representing a majority from a past legislature, and offering an early election in July as a realistic option to take into consideration due to the deadlock situation.

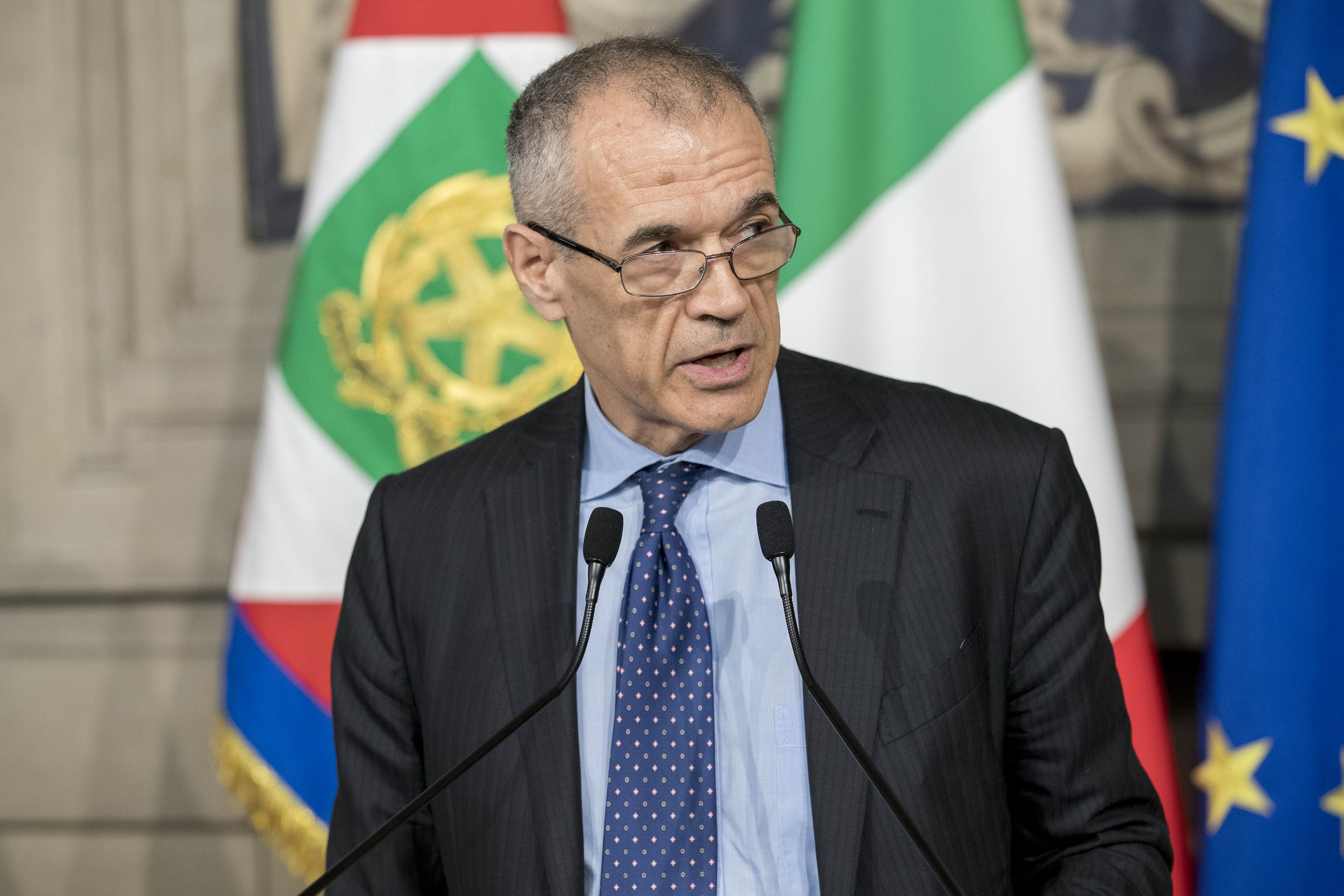
Carlo Cottarelli at the Quirinal Palace

On 9 May, after a day of rumours, both the M5S and the League officially requested President Mattarella to give them 24 more hours to strike a government agreement between the two parties. Later in the evening that same day, Berlusconi publicly announced that FI would not support a M5S–League government on a vote of confidence but would still maintain the centre-right alliance, opening the doors to a possible majority government between the two parties.

On 13 May, the M5S and the League reached an agreement on a government program, clearing the way for the formation of a governing coalition between the two parties, while they still negotiated the members of a government cabinet, including the prime minister. The M5S and League leaders were slated to meet with President Mattarella on 14 May to guide the formation of a new government. On 17 May, the M5S and the League agreed to the details regarding the government program, officially clearing the way for the formation of a governing coalition between the two parties. The final draft of their program was then published on 18 May.

On 18 May, 44,796 members of the M5S cast their vote online on the matter concerning the government agreement, with 42,274, more than 94%, voting in favour. A second vote sponsored by the League then took place on 19 May and 20 May, and was open to the general public. On 20 May, it was announced that approximately 215,000 Italian citizens had participated in the League election, with around 91 percent supporting the government agreement.

On 21 May, the M5S and the League proposed law professor Giuseppe Conte as Prime Minister. On 23 May, Conte was invited to the Quirinal Palace to receive the task of forming a new cabinet and was granted a mandate by President Mattarella. On 27 May, the designated Prime Minister Conte renounced to his office due to contrasts between the League's leader Salvini and President Mattarella. Salvini proposed the university professor Paolo Savona as Minister of Economy and Finances, but Mattarella opposed him, considering Savona too Eurosceptic and anti-German. In his speech after Conte's resignation, Mattarella declared that the two parties wanted to bring Italy out of the eurozone; as the guarantor of the Constitution of Italy and country's interest and stability, he could not allow this. On the following day, Mattarella gave Carlo Cottarelli, an economist and former IMF director, the task of forming a new government.

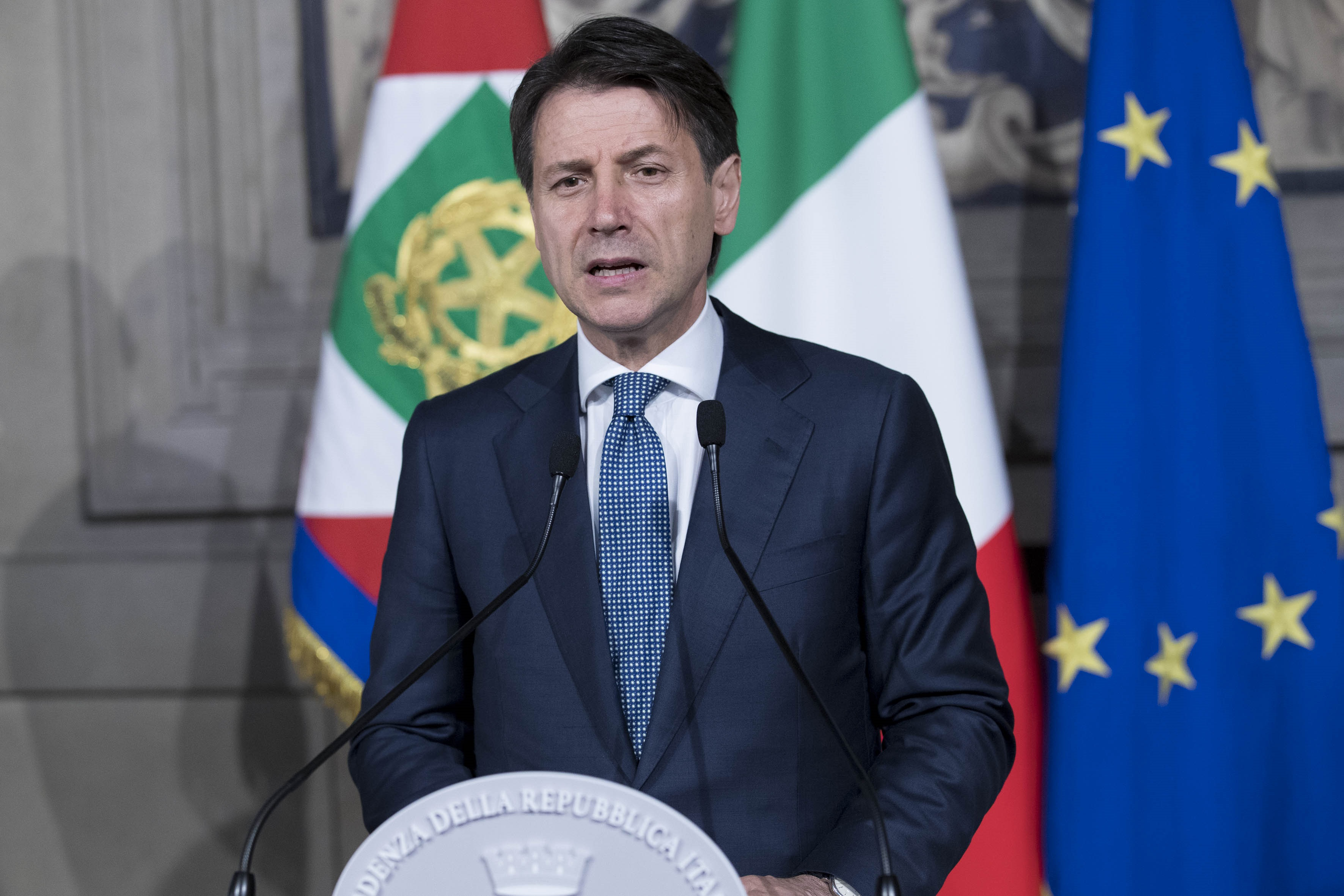
Giuseppe Conte at the Quirinal Palace

In the statement released after the designation, Cottarelli specified that in case of confidence by the Italian Parliament, he would contribute to the approval of the budget law for 2019, then Parliament would be dissolved and a new general election would be called for the beginning of 2019. In the absence of confidence, the government would deal only with the so-called current affairs and lead the country toward new elections after August 2018. Cottarelli also guaranteed the neutrality of the government and the commitment not to run for the next election. He ensured a prudent management of Italian national debt and the defense of national interests through a constructive dialogue with the European Union.

On 28 May 2018, the PD announced that they would vote the confidence to Cottarelli, while the M5S and the centre-right parties FI, the League, and Brothers of Italy (FdI) announced their vote against. Cottarelli was expected to submit his list of ministers for approval to President Mattarella on 29 May. On 29 May and 30 May, he held only informal consultations with Mattarella. According to the Italian media, he was facing difficulties due to the unwillingness of several potential candidates to serve as ministers in his cabinet and may even renounce. Meanwhile, Salvini and Di Maio announced their willingness to restart the negotiations to form a political government, and the FdI leader Giorgia Meloni gave her support to the initiative. The government was formed the following day.

== See also ==
- Politics of Italy
- History of the Italian Republic#Second Republic (1992–present)

Pre-2018 general election

- 2013 Italian local elections
- 2013 Italian regional elections
- 2014 European Parliament election
- 2014 Italian local elections
- 2015 Italian presidential election
- 2015 Italian local elections
- 2015 Italian regional elections
- 2016 Italian local elections
- 2017 Democratic Party (Italy) leadership election
- 2017 Five Star Movement primary election
- 2017 Italian local elections
- 2017 Lega Nord leadership election

Post-2018 general election

- 2018 Italian local elections
- 2018 Italian regional elections
- 2019 Democratic Party (Italy) leadership election
- 2019 European Parliament election in Italy
- 2019 Italian local elections
- 2019 Italian regional elections
- 2020 Italian local elections
- 2020 Italian regional elections
- 2021 Five Star Movement leadership election
- 2021 Italian local elections
- 2021 Italian regional elections
- 2022 Italian presidential election
- 2022 Italian local elections
- 2022 Italian regional elections
- List of elections in 2022
