= Jobs Act =

The Jobs Act may refer to:

- JOBS Act (Jumpstart Our Business Startups Act), a 2012 American law intended to encourage funding of small businesses by easing many of the securities regulations
- Jobs Act, a 2014 Italian law aimed at making the labour market more flexible and reducing unemployment by encouraging companies to hire (named after the 2012 American law)

== See also ==
- American Jobs Act
- Infrastructure Investment and Jobs Act
- Tax Cuts and Jobs Act
