= Giulio Santagata =

Italian politician (1949–2024)

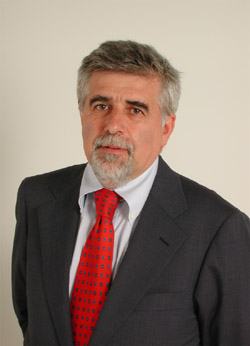
- Santagata in the 2000s

Minister for the Implementation of the Government Program
- In office 17 May 2006 – 8 May 2008
- Prime Minister: Romano Prodi
- Preceded by: Stefano Caldoro
- Succeeded by: Gianfranco Rotondi

Member of the Chamber of Deputies
- In office 30 May 2001 – 14 May 2013
- Constituency: Emilia-Romagna (2001–2006); Lazio 1 (2006–2008); Campania 1 (2008–2013)

Personal details
- Born: 1 October 1949 Zocca, Italy
- Died: 5 January 2024 (aged 74) Modena, Italy
- Party: Dem (1999–2002); The Daisy (2002–2007); PD (2007–2017); AC (2017–2018)
- Education: University of Bologna
- Profession: Economist

Giulio Santagata (1 October 1949 – 5 January 2024) was an Italian politician who was a member of the Italian Chamber of Deputies and the leader of Together.

== Biography ==
Giulio Santagata was born in Zocca, near Modena, in 1949. He graduated with a degree in Economy and Commerce from the University of Bologna and then started working for the region Emilia-Romagna, but after few years he abandoned this job to become a tax advisor.

In 1996 he was appointed economic councilor by Prime Minister Romano Prodi. When Prodi became President of the European Commission in 1999, Santagata followed him in Brussels. In 2001 Santagata was elected in the Italian Chamber of Deputies.

In 2006 Santagata was the main coordinator of Prodi's electoral campaign for the general election, which Prodi narrowly won against the centre-right led by Silvio Berlusconi.

During 2017 there were lengthy talks on the creation of an electoral list to the left of the Democratic Party (PD), within the PD-led centre-left coalition. In this process Giuliano Pisapia, a former mayor of Milan, launched the Progressive Camp (CP) and long pondered the possibility of leading the proposed list, including minor established parties, assorted leftists and, most notably, former members of Left Ecology Freedom (SEL) – which had been folded into the more radical Italian Left (SI).

In December, after Pisapia's retirement and the dissolution of the CP, Santagata founded Civic Area, a progressive party mainly composed of former Olivists, a faction of Prodi's loyalists within Democracy is Freedom and, subsequently, the Democratic Party. After few days, along with Riccardo Nencini (leader of the Italian Socialist Party), Angelo Bonelli (leader of the Federation of the Greens), he launched Together in order to participate in the 2018 general election as a part of the centre-left coalition, along with More Europe (+Eu) and the Popular Civic List (CP). Together's logo was styled on that of The Olive Tree, a broad centre-left coalition active from 1995 to 2007 (when its main components were merged into the PD).

Santagata died on 5 January 2024, at the age of 74.
