= Left Class Revolution =

Political party in Italy

Left Class Revolution Sinistra Classe Rivoluzione
- Abbreviation: SCR
- Leader: Collective leadership (Central Committee)
- Founded: 8 December 2014
- Dissolved: 23 November 2024
- Split from: Communist Refoundation Party
- Succeeded by: Revolutionary Communist Party
- Headquarters: Via Paulucci de Calboli 4, Niguarda, Milan, Italy
- Newspaper: Rivoluzione; FalceMartello
- Ideology: Communism; Trotskyism
- Political position: Far-left
- National affiliation: For a Revolutionary Left (2018)
- International affiliation: International Marxist Tendency
- Colors: Red

Left Class Revolution (Italian: Sinistra Classe Rivoluzione, SCR) was a Trotskyist communist party in Italy. The SCR was the Italian section of the International Marxist Tendency.

== History ==
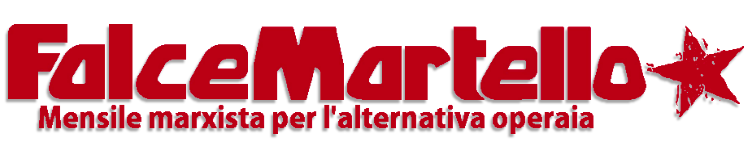
Webheader of the party's newspaper FalceMartello

In 1986 a group of Trotskyists within the Italian Communist Party (PCI) in Ferrara, Emilia-Romagna started a journal named FalceMartello ("HammerSickle"). When the PCI was transformed and became the Democratic Party of the Left in 1991, the group around the journal approached the Communist Refoundation Party (PRC). As of 2001, HammerSickle was an autonomous faction within the party. In the 2005 congress of the PRC, HammerSickle was represented 1.7% of the delegates. It was stronger among the party's youth, obtaining 24.5% of the support in the 2010 youth conference. In the 2011 congress of the PRC, HammerSickle, along with Countercurrent obtained 13.4% of the vote by party members. In 2014 HammerSickle was re-organised within Left Class Revolution,. In 2016 SCR finally left the PRC and became an independent party.

In the run-up of the 2018 general election, SCR joined forces with the similarly Trotskyist Workers' Communist Party (PCL) and formed a joint electoral list named For a Revolutionary Left (PSR), obtaining 0.1% of the vote. Despite proposals from the PCL, the alliance was not repeated.

In the 2022 general election the SCR offered a "critical" support to the far-left joint list People's Union. Since the congress of the Italian General Confederation of Labour held later that year, the SCR has supported the internal component named Le Giornate di Marzo ("The Days of March").

Logo of the Revolutionary Communist Party

During its April 2024 congress, SCR decided to launch the Revolutionary Communist Party (Italian: Partito Comunista Rivoluzionario, PCR), which was formally established in November 2024.
