= For a Revolutionary Left =

For a Revolutionary Left Per una Sinistra Rivoluzionaria
- Leader: Marco Ferrando
- Founded: December 2017
- Dissolved: 2018
- Ideology: Communism; Trotskyism; Revolutionary socialism Anti-Stalinism
- Political position: Far-left
- Colours: Red
- Chamber of Deputies: 0 / 630
- Senate: 0 / 315
- European Parliament: 0 / 73

For a Revolutionary Left (Italian: Per una Sinistra Rivoluzionaria, PSR) was a coalition of Trotskyist parties in Italy. Founded in 2017 to run in the 2018 Italian general election, its leader was Marco Ferrando.

== Composition ==
Parties	Main ideology	Leaders
Workers' Communist Party (PCL)	Communism	Marco Ferrando
Left Class Revolution (SCR)	Communism	Claudio Bellotti

Both parties were Trotskyist, even though they adhered to different strands of Trotskyism as well as different political internationals. Moreover, both of them were for a long time factions within the multi-tendency Communist Refoundation Party (PRC) and later splinter groups of that party.

== Electoral results ==
=== Italian Parliament ===
Election	Leader	Chamber of Deputies				Senate of the Republic			
Election	Leader	Votes	%	Seats	Position	Votes	%	Seats	Position
2018	Marco Ferrando	29,176	0.08	0 / 630	19th	32,501	0.10	0 / 315	18th
