= Together (Italy) =

Italian political coalition

Together Insieme
- Leaders: Giulio Santagata; Riccardo Nencini; Angelo Bonelli
- Founded: 14 December 2017
- Dissolved: 2 December 2018
- Ideology: Social democracy Green politics Pro-Europeanism
- Political position: Centre-left
- National affiliation: Centre-left coalition

Website
- www.insieme2018.it

Together (Italian: Insieme), whose complete name was Italy Europe Together (Italia Europa Insieme, IEI), was a broadly progressive coalition of political parties in Italy that was part of the centre-left coalition for the 2018 general election.

== History ==
During 2017 there were lengthy talks on the creation of an electoral list to the left of the Democratic Party (PD), within the PD-led centre-left coalition. In this process Giuliano Pisapia, a former mayor of Milan, launched the Progressive Camp (CP) and long pondered the possibility of leading the proposed list, including minor established parties, assorted leftists and, most notably, former members of Left Ecology Freedom (SEL) – which had been folded into the more radical Italian Left (SI).

In December, after Pisapia's retirement and the dissolution of the CP, Riccardo Nencini, Angelo Bonelli and Giulio Santagata, respectively leaders of the Italian Socialist Party (PSI), the Federation of the Greens (FdV) and Civic Area (AC), launched Together in order to participate in the 2018 general election as a part of the centre-left coalition, along with More Europe (+E) and the Popular Civic List (CP). Together's logo was styled on that of The Olive Tree, a broad centre-left coalition active from 1995 to 2007 (when its main components were merged into the PD).

Some of Pisapia's followers launched the Progressive Area (AP) and looked set to join Together, However, after tensions with Together leaders, it was announced that AP had signed an agreement with +E, already composed of the Italian Radicals, Forza Europa and the Democratic Centre, also with the centre-left.

In the election the list obtained a mere 0.6% of the vote and no seats. However, two of its members elected in single-seat constituencies: Nencini (PSI) to the Senate in Arezzo and Serse Soverini (AC) to the Chamber in Imola.

On 2 December 2018, the Federation of the Greens left Together, ending de facto the alliance.

== Composition ==
Party	Main ideology	Leader/s
Italian Socialist Party	Social democracy	Riccardo Nencini
Federation of the Greens	Green politics	Angelo Bonelli
Civic Area	Progressivism	Giulio Santagata

== Election results ==
Election	Leader	Chamber of Deputies				Senate of the Republic			
Election	Leader	Votes	%	Seats	Position	Votes	%	Seats	Position
2018	Giulio Santagata	190,601	0.58	1 / 630	12th	163,454	0.54	1 / 315	12th
