= International Socialist League (2019) =

International Socialist League Liga Internacional Socialista
- Abbreviation: ISL-LIS
- Founded: 24/25 May 2019
- Preceded by: International Trotskyist Opposition (ITO) 2020–2022
- Headquarters: Barcelona, Spain
- Ideology: Socialism; Marxism; Trotskyism; Internationalism
- Political position: Left-wing

Website
- lis-isl.org

The International Socialist League (ISL-LIS) is an international political organization made up of national revolutionary socialist and Trotskyist parties and organizations from five continents.

The ISL was founded at a conference held in Barcelona on May 24–26 2019. The initiative was a result of the merging of the organizations that made up the Anticapitalist Network – the Workers' Socialist Movement (Argentina) (MST) and Socialist Tide of Venezuela, among others – and the Socialist Laborers Party (SEP) of Turkey. The Anticapitalist Network was dissolved in a meeting the day before the ISL founding conference. Delegates from a score of countries founded the new international organization and voted on a common program at the Barcelona conference.

In its program, the ISL declares its strategic objective as the “building revolutionary parties and a revolutionary International” to “definitely overthrow capitalism and undertake the worldwide construction of socialism.”

The organizations that make up the ISL come from different revolutionary tendencies and currents. The ISL hence proposes a working method based on adherence to a revolutionary program and strategy, common intervention in the class struggle through international campaigns and mutual support in the construction of revolutionary organizations in each country, but respecting the diverse traditions and trajectories of the national organizations that comprise it, and the different tactics and policies that member organizations adopt to intervene in each country.

Since its founding, the ISL has incorporated more parties and founded new groups, extending its organized presence to the five continents. The organization's first congress, scheduled for May 2020, was postponed due to the COVID-19 pandemic and held in December 2021.

During 2020, the ISL held two virtual international youth conferences, on June 20 and July 13, and two virtual international conferences, on August 9 and December 12. Organizations from over 30 countries, including Argentina, Pakistan, Australia, Turkey, United States, France, Chile, Lebanon, Belarus, Iraq, Brazil, Western Sahara, Spanish State, Russia, Iran, Colombia, Venezuela, United Kingdom, Peru, Ukraine, Nicaragua, Sweden, Bolivia, Ecuador, Paraguay and Uruguay participated in the December conference.

The political resolution of the conference assesses the current economic and health crisis as a profound capitalist crisis that generates political and social polarization, rebellions and revolutions, expanding the political space and opportunities for the revolutionary left. It also proposes a socialist program to resolve the crisis and calls on the revolutionaries of the world to unite in the political and social struggle and together build revolutionary socialist parties and a revolutionary international organization to fight for governments of the workers and peoples and a socialist world.

== Campaigns ==
Since its foundation, the ISL has carried out a series of international campaigns, with coordinated actions and mobilizations in various countries, collection of signatures, photos and videos of support and collections of donations, including: in solidarity with the Yellow Vests of France; in support of the rebellion in the United States after the assassination of George Floyd; for the release of Ali Wazir in Pakistan; against the repression and persecution of labor leaders and activists in Venezuela; in support of the popular revolution in Chile; in support of Catalan self-determination; "One Dollar / One Euro for Lebanon" in support of the Lebanese people after the explosion in the port of Beirut; “Democracy is Essential” in support of the right to mobilize in Australia; in support of the student movement and against the persecution of activists in Colombia; against repression and persecution in Russia; against repression and in support of popular rebellion in Belarus; for the self-determination of Western Sahara; for unified public health systems in the face of the covid-19 pandemic; against Turkish aggression in Rojava and the self-determination of Kurdistan.

The ISL intends to hold an international forum on 24 January 2026 in relation to Venezuela.

== Publications ==
The ISL publishes the magazine Permanent Revolution and the isl-lis.org website with articles in English, Spanish, French, Portuguese, Russian, Arabic and Turkish.

== 2022–2025 Splits and fusions ==
In November 2022 the Socialist Laborers Party (SEP) of Turkey announced that it was leaving the ISL. The SEP criticized the position of the ISL as pro-NATO and accused the leader of the Ukrainian section of associating with fascists. This precipitated a split in The Struggle Pakistan with a minority leaving the ISL.

In early 2025 the International Trotskyist Opposition decided to join the ISL, which meant that the Communist Workers' Party (Italy) became its Italian section.

In December 2025 the ISL held its 3rd World Congress in Istanbul, where the League for the Fifth International had agreed to join the ISL on the basis of a newly agreed common programme.

Left Voice, the publication of the international current of the Socialist Workers' Party (Argentina), has published an article polemicising against the decisions of this congress, which the ISL has replied to on its website.

== Members ==
Prominent members include Cele Fierro, Vilma Ripoll and Marco Ferrando.
