= Civic Area =

Civic Area Area Civica
- Leader: Giulio Santagata
- Founded: 14 December 2017
- Dissolved: 2018
- Split from: Democratic Party
- Ideology: Progressivism
- Political position: Centre-left
- National affiliation: Electoral list Together; Coalition: Centre-left coalition
- Colours: Orange

Civic Area (Italian: Area Civica, AC) was a progressive political party in Italy.

Led by Giulio Santagata, a former minister in Romano Prodi's second government, AC was mainly composed of former Olivists, a faction of Prodi's loyalists within Democracy is Freedom and, subsequently, the Democratic Party (PD).

In December 2017 AC formed, along with the Italian Socialist Party, the Federation of the Greens and Progressive Area, the Together electoral list, within the centre-left coalition, for the upcoming 2018 general election.

In the election the list obtained a mere 0.6% of the vote and no seats. However, Serse Soverini (AC) was elected to the Chamber from the single-seat constituency of Imola, Emilia-Romagna.

In October 2018 Soverini joined Italia in Comune and soon became the party's regional coordinator in Emilia-Romagna. In September 2019, after Matteo Renzi had left to form Italia Viva, Soverini joined the PD.

== Election results ==
=== Italian Parliament ===
Election	Leader	Chamber of Deputies					Senate of the Republic				
Election	Leader	Votes	%	Seats	+/–	Position	Votes	%	Seats	+/–	Position
2018	Giulio Santagata	Into Together		1 / 630	New	12th	Into Together		0 / 315	New	12th
