= People's List for the Constitution =

People's List for the Constitution Lista del Popolo per la Costituzione
- Leader: Antonio Ingroia
- Founded: November 2017
- Dissolved: 2018
- Ideology: Anti-corruption; Left-wing populism Euroscepticism
- Political position: Left-wing
- Colours: Orange

Website
- www.listadelpopolo.it

People's List for the Constitution (Italian: Lista del Popolo per la Costituzione, LdP) was a left-wing and anti-corruption electoral list founded by Antonio Ingroia and Giulietto Chiesa in November 2017 to run in the Italian general election on 4 March 2018.

== Election results ==
=== Italian Parliament ===
Election	Leader	Chamber of Deputies				Senate of the Republic			
Election	Leader	Votes	%	Seats	Position	Votes	%	Seats	Position
2018	Antonio Ingroia	9,921	0.02	0 / 630	23rd	10,356	0.03	0 / 315	22nd
