= Progressive Area =

Progressive Area Area Progressista
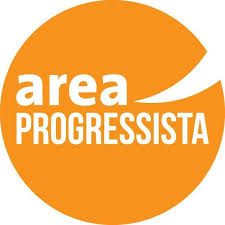
- Leader: Michele Ragosta
- Founded: December 2017
- Dissolved: 2018
- Preceded by: Progressive Camp
- Ideology: Progressivism
- Political position: Left-wing
- National affiliation: Electoral list: More Europe; Coalition: Centre-left coalition
- Colours: Orange

Progressive Area (Italian: Area Progressista, AP) was a democratic-socialist political party in Italy.

AP is mainly composed of former members of Progressive Camp (CP), a tentative party founded and briefly led by Giuliano Pisapia, who finally decided not to run and declared CP's experience over. AP's leading members include Michele Ragosta, Adriano Zaccagnini and Luigi Lacquaniti, all three former members of Left Ecology Freedom (of which Pisapia was an independent) and transitated through the Democratic Party and the Democratic and Progressive Movement.

In the run-up of the 2018 general election, AP was originally headed into the Together electoral list within the centre-left coalition, along with the Italian Socialist Party, the Federation of the Greens and Civic Area. However, after tensions with Together leaders, in January 2018 it was announced that AP had signed an agreement with the More Europe electoral list, already composed of the Italian Radicals, Forza Europa and the Democratic Centre, also with the centre-left. No members of Progressive Area were elected; following the election, AP did not merge into More Europe.
