= Marco Ferrando =

Italian politician

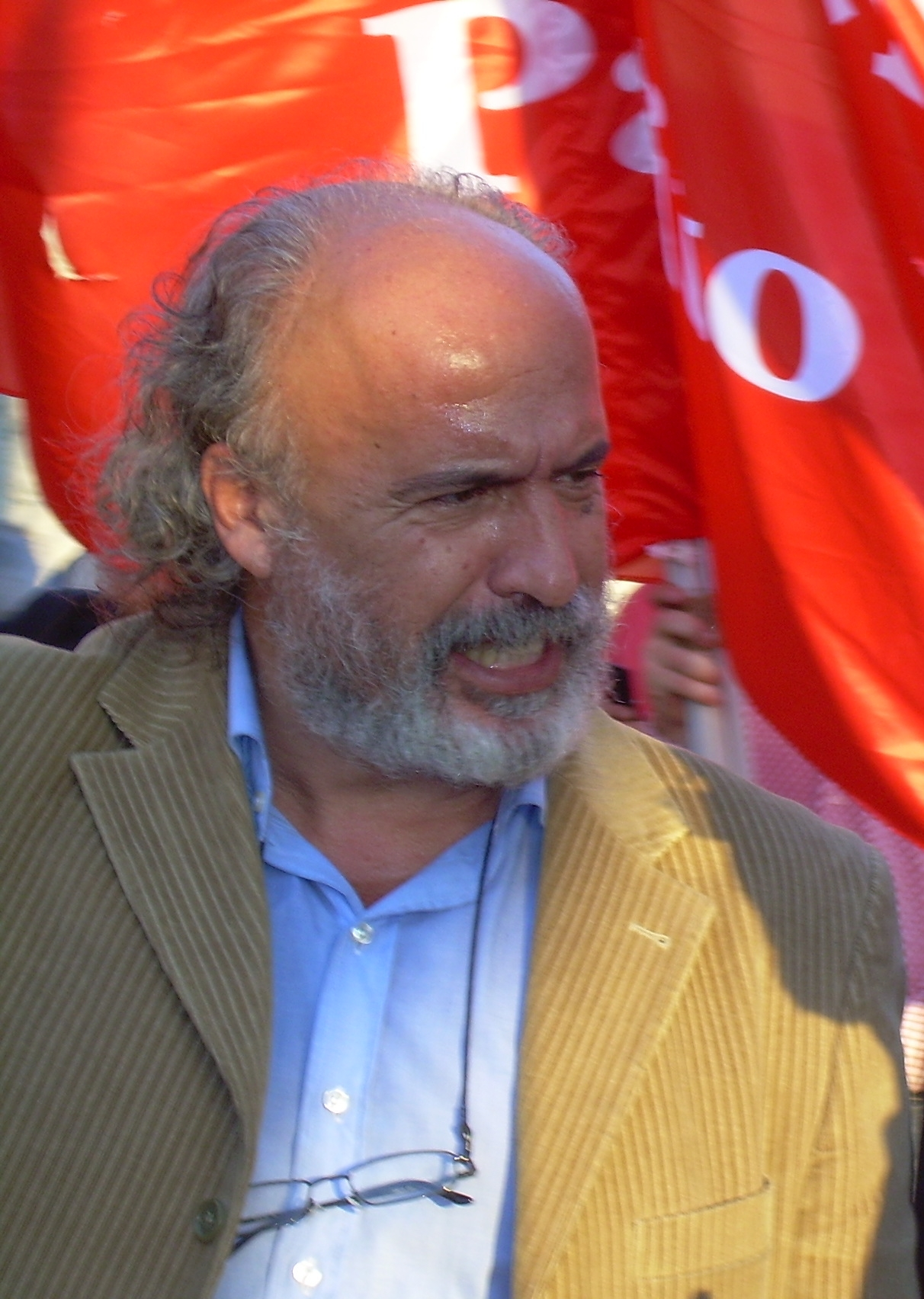
Marco Ferrando during demonstration in Rome, 11 October 2008

Marco Ferrando (born 18 July 1954, Genoa) is an Italian Trotskyist activist and politician, a leading member of the Workers' Communist Party, Italian section of the International Socialist League (2019).

In February 2006, in the build-up to the 2006 Italian general election, he was removed from the Communist Refoundation Party (PRC)'s list of candidates for the Senate of Italy because of his support for the right of Iraqis to resist occupation, and criticism of Zionism.

When the PRC joined the current center-left government, the AMR Progetto Comunista left the PRC. After that, they dissolved and formed the Movement for the Communist Workers' Party.

He is an atheist.
