= Workers' Communist Party (Italy) =

Political party in Italy

Workers' Communist Party Partito Comunista dei Lavoratori
- Leader: Marco Ferrando
- Founded: 18 June 2006
- Split from: Communist Refoundation Party
- Headquarters: Via Marco Aurelio 7, Milan
- Newspaper: Unità di Classe
- Ideology: Communism; Trotskyism; Anti-Stalinism
- Political position: Far-left
- International affiliation: International Socialist League (2019), International Trotskyist Opposition (2022-25), Coordinating Committee for the Refoundation of the Fourth International (2004–2017)
- Colors: Red

Website
- pclavoratori.it

The Workers' Communist Party (Italian: Partito Comunista dei Lavoratori, PCL) is a communist party in Italy. It was created in 2006 by the Trotskyist breakaway wing of the Communist Refoundation Party led by Marco Ferrando. The PCL is the Italian section of International Socialist League (2019).

== History ==
The foundation of the Italian Communist Workers' Party (PCL) as a new political entity was the result of a split within the Communist Refoundation Party (PRC) when the PRC joined the second government headed by Romano Prodi. The movement, known as Common Project since its inception, had taken a stance further to the left within the party as it opposed the political alliance with The Olive Tree, an association of center-left parties, being extremely critical of past centre-left governments, in particular the first Prodi government with Massimo D'Alema and Giuliano Amato. The "Common Project" movement was also opposed to the politics of the then Secretary of the PRC Fausto Bertinotti. The group refused to be part of the new government, maintaining that such participation would be disastrous. Moreover, following the exclusion of their leader Marco Ferrando from the electoral list of the PRC for the elections to the Senate in the 2006, his followers pushed for a split in the party to maintain a communist opposition to the new government.

The birth of the movement was seen as a response to the emergence of two new left-wing political parties: the Democratic Party (PD), the fusion of the Democrats of the Left and Democracy is Freedom – The Daisy; and The Left – The Rainbow, an organization that grouped together the Party of Italian Communists, the Democrats of the Left and the Greens, along with the PRC. The backers of the PCL believed that the future PD would be centrist and liberal and close to the interests of banks and corporations. Regarding the Rainbow Left, they considered this coalition fundamentally social democratic and too close to the administration with only a pretension of revolutionary idealism and radicalism. The constitution of the PCL was implemented on 18 June 2006 at the Barberini movie theatre in Rome. Agreement was reached regarding a new symbol and a coordination at the national level. From this date onward, member were free to join the new party and promote political activism.

Adherence to the new party comes from activists and communist leaders, members of the PRC, from the leftist trade unions, the Italian General Confederation of Labour (from the group of 28 April Network) and other trade organizations (RdB, CUB, COBAS, Sin COBAS and SLAI COBAS). Further support come from the anti-globalization movements, groups opposing imperialism and those in favor of overthrowing the government in Israel (in particular the Palestine Forum) or protesting against the war. Representatives of the civil rights and sexual liberation (especially in Rome) movements also manifest their interest.

In autumn 2006, the PCL together with other peace organizations and anti-imperialist participants in the protest against the military missions in Afghanistan and Lebanon (30 September) and in the national demonstration of anti-Israeli activity with Palestinian people, sponsored by the Palestine Forum. On 17 November, the PCL participates in the general strike called by trade unions against the government.

On 14 April 2007, the first meeting of the movement was held, which according to its managers had about 1,300 members (530 participants in meetings) in the congress.

In late 2007, members were elected to the National Coordination and the new National Executive bodies to organize the PCL constitutive congress in January 2008.

At the 2008 elections, the Workers' Communist Party got 208,000 votes, or 0.6%.

In 2009, it was joined by the Alternative Proletarian Communist Organization, born from a split in the Communist Alternative Party.

There was some possibility that it would be the only party using the label Communist standing in the 2013 Italian general election. However, the PCL decided to run under their official name in which they gained slightly less than 90,000 votes.

For the 2018 elections, the PCL and Left, Class and Revolution presented a list named For a Revolutionary Left.

== Party relations ==
The PCL was affiliated to the Coordinating Committee for the Refoundation of the Fourth International, a Trotskyist political international. The party has a very conflicting relationship with the Communist Alternative Party (PdAC), another Trotskyist political organization in Italy.

The PCL was involved in the re-launch of the International Trotskyist Opposition at a conference in late 2022.

In 2025 the ITO decided to join the International Socialist League (2019), so the PCL became its Italian section.

== Electoral results ==
=== Italian Parliament ===
Election	Leader	Chamber of Deputies				Senate of the Republic			
Election	Leader	Votes	%	Seats	+/–	Votes	%	Seats	+/–
2008	Marco Ferrando	208,296	0.57	0 / 630	New	180,442	0.55	0 / 315	New
2013	Marco Ferrando	89,995	0.26	0 / 630	0	113,936	0.37	0 / 315	0
2018	Marco Ferrando	Into PSR		0 / 630	0	Into PSR		0 / 315	0
2022	Marco Ferrando	Did not compete				4,484	0.02	0 / 200	0

=== European Parliament ===
Election	Leader	Votes	%	Seats	+/–	EP Group
2009	Marco Ferrando	166,531	0.54	0 / 72	New	–

=== Regional Councils ===
Region	Election year	Votes	%	Seats	+/−
Liguria	2015	3,036	0.56	0 / 31	–
Umbria	2015	1,662	0.47	0 / 21	–
Lazio	2013	5,886	0.21	0 / 51	–
Abruzzo	2008	2,018	0.37	0 / 45	–
Basilicata	2010	698	0.22	0 / 30	–
Basilicata	2013	869	0.37	0 / 21	–
Sicily	2012	2,031	0.10	0 / 90	–
