= Progressive Camp =

Progressive Camp Campo Progressista
- Leader: Giuliano Pisapia
- Founded: 14 February 2017 (launched); 11 March 2017 (founded)
- Dissolved: 6 December 2017
- Succeeded by: Progressive Area
- Ideology: Democratic socialism Progressivism
- Political position: Left-wing
- Colours: Orange

The Progressive Camp (Italian: Campo Progressista, CP) was a left-wing political party in Italy.

Its leader was Giuliano Pisapia, a former member of the Chamber of Deputies (1996–2006) for the Communist Refoundation Party (PRC) and later mayor of Milan (2011–2016) as an independent close to Left Ecology Freedom (SEL).

== History ==
The CP, which was launched in Milan by Pisapia and sponsored by Laura Boldrini, Gad Lerner, Bruno Tabacci (leader of the Democratic Centre, CD) and others in February 2017, aimed at unifying the portion of the Italian left interested in forming an alliance with the centre-left Democratic Party (PD). In this respect, the CP held a different position from that of Italian Left (SI), into which SEL was folded in 2015–2017, as SI refused to form a national alliance with the PD.

A large splinter group from SEL, led by Arturo Scotto, Massimiliano Smeriglio and Francesco Ferrara, looked set to join forces with Pisapia, but eventually joined the Democratic and Progressive Movement (MDP), a party founded by left-wing splinters from the PD (Roberto Speranza, Pier Luigi Bersani, Massimo D'Alema, etc.) on 25 February 2017.

The CP was officially founded on 11 March 2017 in Rome, in a public convention held at Teatro Brancaccio.

In July 2017 the MDP and the CP organised a joint rally in Rome, but the two parties finally parted ways in October. However, even after this, at least 15 MDP MPs continued to be associated with the CP.

In December 2017 the MDP and SI launched Free and Equal (LeU), while the CP was instead trying to organise a pro-PD left-wing grouping, possibly along with the Italian Socialist Party (PSI) and the Federation of the Greens.

Finally, on 6 December 2017, Pisapia announced that he would not run in the 2018 general election and declared CP's experience over. Some of his allies, including Ferrara, would join LeU, while others, including Smeriglio and Michele Ragosta, would form, in alliance with the PD, the left-wing list that Pisapia once envisioned. The latter group would launch Progressive Area, which would join the liberal More Europe electoral alliance.
