= Antonio Ingroia =

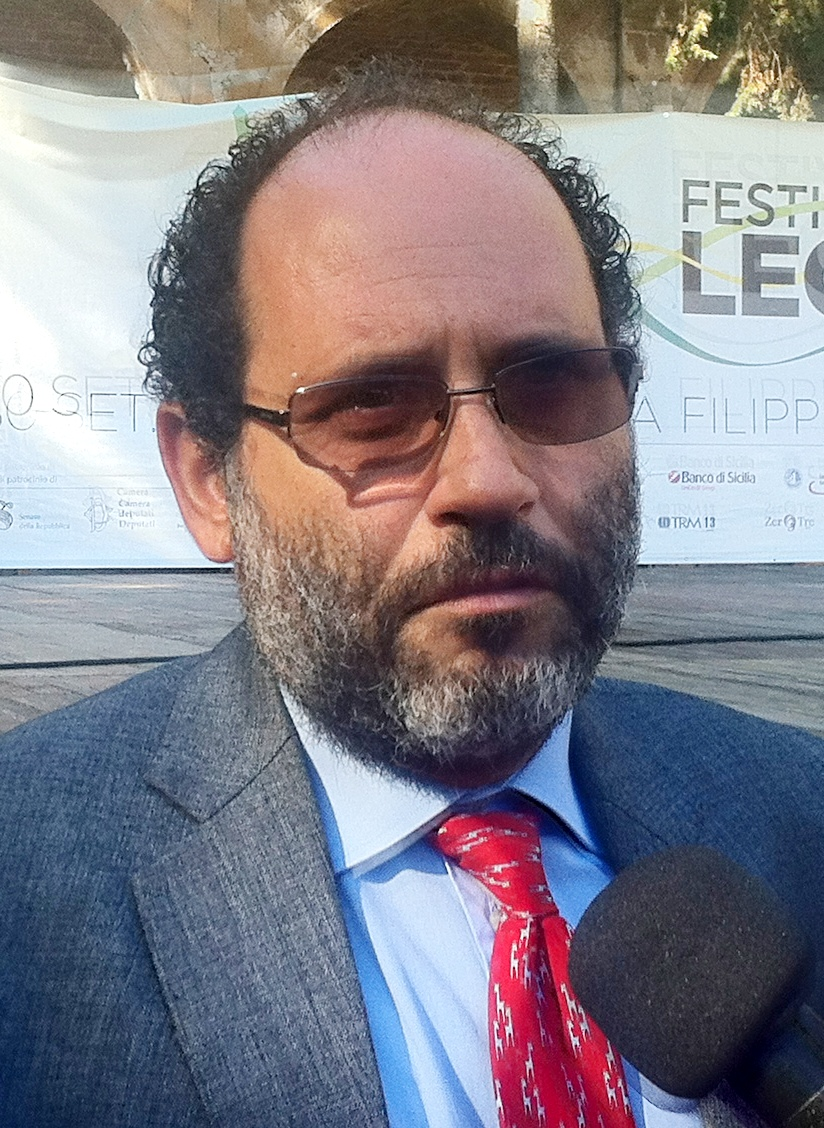

Leader of Civil Revolution
- In office 29 December 2012 – 2 April 2013
- Preceded by: Office established
- Succeeded by: Office dissolved

Personal details
- Born: 31 March 1959 (age 67) Palermo, Italy
- Party: People's List for the Constitution
- Education: University of Palermo
- Profession: Magistrate

Antonio Ingroia (born 31 March 1959) is an Italian lawyer, ex magistrate, politician and leader of Civil Revolution, with Luigi de Magistris, the mayor of Naples. Ingroia is also the director of a United Nations investigation against narcotraffic in Guatemala. He is also a writer and contributes regular columns to the daily newspaper Il Fatto Quotidiano.

== Biography ==
Antonio Ingroia was born in Palermo, the capital city of Sicily, Italy. In 1987 Ingroia started to cooperate in the Antimafia pool of Giovanni Falcone and Paolo Borsellino, two Italian magistrates who were killed in 1992 by the Mafia. In 2009 he became deputy chief anti-mafia prosecutor of Palermo. On 26 July 2012 he became the director of a UN investigation into narcotraffic in Guatemala. On 29 December 2012, he announced that he would run to become Prime Minister of Italy at the head of the Civil Revolution coalition.
