= Labor policy in Italy =

Italy does not have a national unified labor code. Labor legislation is wide-ranging, with laws, regulations and statutes that bear on labor relations. The Constitution of Italy (articles 35–47) contains declarations of principle relating to fair payment, maximum working hours, vacation, protection of women and minors, social insurance, illness, disability, industrial diseases and accidents, Freedom of Association and the right to strike. The Workers' Statute of 1970 plays an important role and was modified later on.

== Law 350 ==
Act of Law 350 enacted on 17 July 1898, created the National Social Protection Fund for Worker Disability and Old Age which later became the Instituto Nazionale della Previdenza Sociale (INPS) in 1933. The Act established the social protection system in Italy.

In 1994 Italy's pension system changed from a wage-based system to a contribution-based system that is monitored by the INPS. But the system was only for people who had been working for less than eighteen years as of 1994. Therefore, most workers stayed under the older wage-based system until well into the 2000s. Further reforms towards a contribution-based system were enacted in 2011 by the Monti Cabinet's, in an attempt to implement legislation regarding market liberalization at the request of the European Central Bank (ECB).

== Employment terms ==
=== Employment rights ===
Constitutional rights of employment are laid out in Italy's constitution. This document gives all citizens a right to work, to receive fair pay, dictates maximum hours, and guarantees paid vacations. Since 1987, the Italian Department of Labor has limited the maximum working hours to 48 hours a week. Workers must take one day off for every six days of work (weekly). They are also entitled to national holidays and regular holidays. Those who provide domestic services are eligible for a minimum of eight days of paid leave, and all other workers receive a minimum of three weeks.

=== Wages ===
Italy has no set amount for minimum wage, but an employee's salary must be reflective of the quantity and quality of the work that they present. The salary must provide the employee and family with a living wage. The wage must relate to the average wage of those in the same industry. Italy also has a wage guarantee fund. This fund, known as the Redundancy Fund (Cassa integrazione guadagni, CIG), managed by the INPS, is meant to help those whose working hours have been shortened or those on temporary suspension.

=== Employment protections ===
The Constitution protects women, minors, the elderly, the ill, the disabled and those hurt on the job. It protects those who strike and those who assemble.

The minimum working age in statutory law is fifteen, but the civil law varies. Paid sick leave is determined by employee-specific contracts, but sick leave can be extended with unpaid leave. All terminated employees receive severance pay. Severance is a part of the annual salary and is accrued. Severance pay is calculated by multiplying 7.5% of annual salary by the number of years worked. Additionally, the terminated employee receives 75% of the consumer price index increase.

=== Family policies ===
In Italy women's unemployment is twice as high as men's. Women are protected and receive maternity leave. From the start of pregnancy, to the year following childbirth, women's jobs are protected and are considered absent for a significant reason. Women must take maternity leave two months prior to childbirth and return three months following childbirth. During this time, the women are paid 80% of their daily salary.

Italy gives family benefits in the form of money. Family benefits are increased for any family member who is handicapped.

== History ==
The 2015 Jobs Act introduced controversial changes to labor law. Its aim is to reduce barriers to employment by making it easier to dismiss workers. Article 18 of the Workers Statute 1970 gives workers significant leverage because it requires employers with 15 or more workers to rehire permanent employees who were wrongfully dismissed. Because the article does not apply to companies with fewer than 15 workers or fixed-term employment, the theory is that it results in a labor market where employers are reluctant to hire employees when they approach the 15-employee threshold.
