= Jobs Act (Italy) =

2016 labour law reform in Italy

Legge 10 dicembre 2014, n. 183

Italian Parliament
- Long title: Deleghe al Governo in materia di riforma degli ammortizzatori sociali, dei servizi per il lavoro e delle politiche attive, nonché in materia di riordino delle forme contrattuali e dell'attività ispettiva e di tutela e conciliazione delle esigenze di cura, di vita e di lavoro
- Citation: Law No. 183/2014
- Territorial extent: Italy
- Passed by: Chamber of Deputies
- Passed: 25 November 2014
- Passed by: Senate of the Republic
- Passed: 3 December 2014
- Assented to by: President Giorgio Napolitano
- Assented to: 10 December 2014
- Commenced: 16 December 2014

First chamber: Chamber of Deputies
- Introduced by: Prime Minister Matteo Renzi

Amended by
- Constitutional Court rulings (2018, 2020)

Summary
- Labour market reform introducing the “contract with increasing protections”, modifying unemployment benefits, and simplifying dismissal regulations.

Keywords
- Labour law, Jobs Act, social security, contracts
- Status: In force

The Jobs Act was a reform of labour law in Italy aimed at making the labour market more flexible. Promoted and implemented by the Renzi government through the issuance of various legislative provisions, it was completed in 2016. The name was inspired by the homonymous provision of the Obama administration in 2012, although it had different characteristics. The provision, bitterly opposed by various political groups and some labour unions, was adopted with the aim of reducing unemployment by encouraging companies to hire.

== History ==
Upon becoming prime minister, Matteo Renzi said that labour market reform, which was thought to be "long overdue", and was opposed by major trade unions and organised labour, to introduce labour market flexibility, would be at the top of his agenda to improve the state of the Italian economy. On 12 March 2014, the Renzi Cabinet issued a law-decree on fixed-term contracts, called the Poletti Decree, from the name of the Labour Minister Giuliano Poletti, as well as a bill proposing major reforms to the Italian labour market called the Jobs Act. A reduction in the tax burden of about €80 was announced for those earning less than €1,500 per month. On 30 April, Renzi and Marianna Madia, the Minister for the Public Administration, presented the guidelines for the reform of the public administration, which was approved by the Renzi Cabinet on 13 June, before becoming law on 7 August.

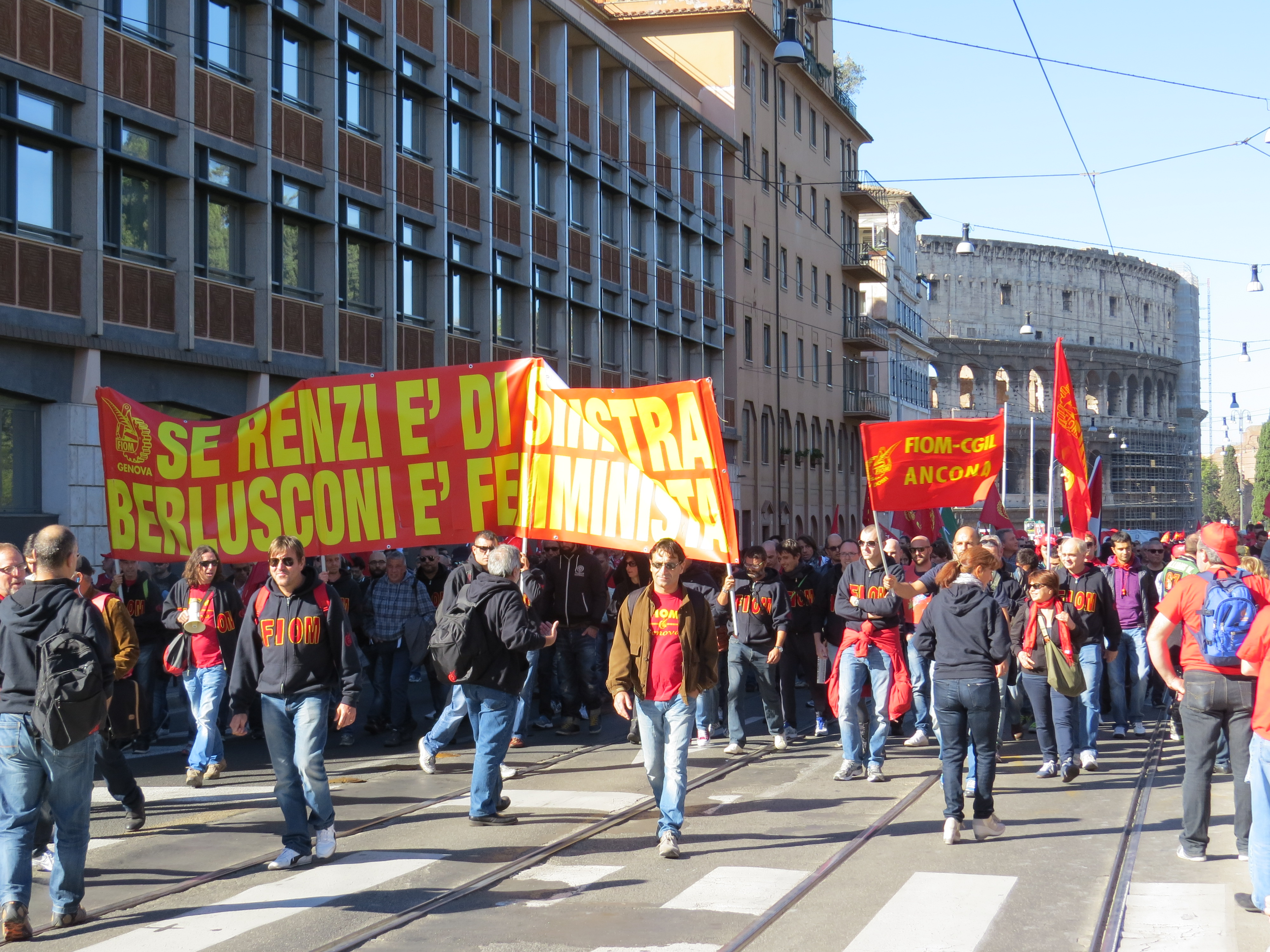
Trade union protesters demonstrate near the Colosseum against Renzi's labour market reforms

In September 2014, the government sought approval for the Jobs Act, which provided for, among other things, the abolition of Article 18 of the Workers' Statute, which protected workers from unjustified dismissal. The proposal was criticised by organised labour, especially the largest trade union, the Italian General Confederation of Labour (CGIL), and its leaders Susanna Camusso and Maurizio Landini. Moreover, the left wing of the Democratic Party (PD), by then led by Renzi's rival and former PD secretary Pier Luigi Bersani, criticised the government for the reform, threatening to vote against it.

On 29 September, the National Committee of the PD voted to support the Jobs Act, despite the disagreements within the party, with 130 votes in favour, 20 against, and 11 abstaining. On 9 October, the Senate voted to approve the Jobs Act, and the landmark reform passed with 165 votes in favour to 111 against, marking the first step for the most ambitious economic legislation of the eight-month-old government. Before the vote, Labour Minister Poletti was forced to cut his speech short due to the loud protests of the Five Star Movement (M5S) and Lega Nord (Lega) oppositions, some of whom threw coins and papers. German chancellor Angela Merkel, who was visiting Milan and had been among the most vocal politicians regarding Italy's need for speedy economic reforms, said the labour law marked an "important step" to reduce "employment barriers" in the eurozone's third-largest economy.

On 25 October, almost one million people took part in a mass protest in Rome, organised by the CGIL in opposition to the labour reforms of the government. Some high-profile members of the left-wing faction of the PD, including Gianni Cuperlo, Stefano Fassina, and Giuseppe Civati, also participated in the protest. On 8 November, more than 100,000 public employees protested in Rome in a demonstration organised by the three largest trade unions in the country, the CGIL, the CISL, and the UIL. On 25 November, the Chamber of Deputies approved the Jobs Act with 316 votes; the M5S, Lega, and almost forty members of the PD abstained from the vote to protest against the reform. On 3 December, the Senate gave the final approval it needed to become law.

In January 2017, the Jobs Act was taken to the Constitutional Court of Italy; Renzi and his supporters said that the law was necessary for job creation and to attract investors, while its critics responded that it diminished workers' rights without generating new jobs. The court rejected a petition, which received 3.3. million signatures, for a referendum to be held about the Job Acts. In September 2018, the Jobs Acts was partially repealed after the same court declared the compensation rules for claims of unlawful dismissal to be unconstitutional, on the grounds that these rules were not in line with the principles of "reasonableness and equality" and conflicted with the concept of "protection of work" as granted by Articles 4 and 35. In July 2020, the court accepted the questions raised from the tribunals of Bari and Rome about the same matter, ruling the compensation rules to be in violation of the constitutional principles of equality, reasonableness, and job protection; it was the first time that a ruling was signed by three women.

=== June 8 and 9, 2025: Abrogative referendums ===
In 2024, the CGIL trade union started a public petition to reach 500,000 signatures. This number was needed by the Italian Constitution for an abrogative referendum. CGIL would like to repeal the Jobs Act's rule abolishing the real protection (tutela reale, in Italian labour law) that was previously provided by Article 18 of the Workers' Statute. This norm provided workers with the right to be replaced in the same job description and complexive wage they had before termination of employment (reintegrazione_{it}).

The 5 abrogative referendums are set for 8 and 9 June 2025.

The referendum also concerns mandatory protection (tutela obbligatoria, in Italian labour right) in public subjects and private companies with fewer than 15 employees. The CGIL proposes to abolish the upper limit of six months' pay of economic compensation by employers, leaving the labour judge free to determine the damage.

== See also ==
- Jumpstart Our Business Startups Act
