= Politics of Campania =

Regional Italian politics

The politics of Campania, a region of Italy, takes place in the framework of an "anomalous presidential" representative democracy or prime-ministerial system with an executive presidency, whereby the President of Regional Government is the head of government, and of a pluriform multi-party system. Executive power is exercised by the Regional Government. Legislative power is vested in both the government and the Regional Council.

== Executive branch ==
The Regional Government (Giunta Regionale) is presided by the President of the Region (Presidente della Regione), who is elected for a five-year term, and is composed by the President and the Ministers (Assessori), who are currently eight, including a vice president, all appointed by the President.

== Elected by the Regional Council (1970–1995) ==
#	Name	Term of office		Political party	Legislature
1	Carlo Leone	1970	1971	DC	I (1970)
2	Nicola Mancino (b. 1931)	1971	1972	DC	I (1970)
3	Alberto Servidio (1930–2017)	1972	1973	DC	I (1970)
4	Vittorio Cascetta (1928–1989)	1973	1975	DC	I (1970)
(2)	Nicola Mancino (b. 1931)	1975	1976	DC	II (1975)
5	Gaspare Russo (1927–2026)	1976	1979	DC	II (1975)
6	Ciro Cirillo (1921–2017)	1979	1980	DC	II (1975)
7	Emilio De Feo (1920–1987)	1980	1983	DC	III (1980)
8	Antonio Fantini (1936–2013)	1983	1985	DC	III (1980)
8	Antonio Fantini (1936–2013)	1985	1989	DC	IV (1985)
9	Ferdinando Clemente di San Luca (1925–2004)	1989	1990	DC	IV (1985)
9	Ferdinando Clemente di San Luca (1925–2004)	1990	1993	DC	V (1990)
10	Giovanni Grasso (1940–1999)	1993	1995	DC	V (1990)
11	Antonio Rastrelli (1927–2019)	8 June 1995	23 March 1999 (Note: Rastrelli was forced out of office by a motion of non-confidence voted by the Regional Council. The opposition leader Andrea Losco (PPI) was elected President by the Regional Council to end Rastrelli's term.)	AN	VI (1995)
12	Andrea Losco (b. 1951)	23 March 1999	18 May 2000	PPI	VI (1995)

== Directly-elected presidents (since 2000) ==
N.	Portrait	President	Term of office		Tenure (Years and days)	Party	Composition	Legislature
13		Antonio Bassolino (1947– )	18 May 2000	4 May 2005	9 years, 334 days	Democrats of the Left / Democratic Party	DS–PPI–UDEUR–Dem–SDI– PRC–RI–FdV–PdCI–PRI	VII (2000)
13		Antonio Bassolino (1947– )	4 May 2005	17 April 2010	9 years, 334 days	Democrats of the Left / Democratic Party	DL–DS–UDEUR–SDI– PRC–FdV–PdCI–IdV–PRI	VIII (2005)
14		Stefano Caldoro (1960– )	17 April 2010	18 June 2015	5 years, 62 days	The People of Freedom / Forza Italia	PdL–UDC–NS–UDEUR–LD	IX (2010)
15		Vincenzo De Luca (1949– )	18 June 2015	9 October 2020	10 years, 174 days	Democratic Party	PD–CD–SC–UDC–PSI–IdV	X (2015)
15		Vincenzo De Luca (1949– )	9 October 2020	9 December 2025	10 years, 174 days	Democratic Party	PD–IV–Pop–NC–LD–CD– PSI–Eu–EV	XI (2020)
16		Roberto Fico (1974– )	9 December 2025	Incumbent	286 days	Five Star Movement	PD–M5S–ATA–PSI–IV–AVS–NdC	XII (2025)

== Legislative branch ==
The Regional Council of Campania (Consiglio Regionale della Campania) is composed of 60 members. 48 councillors are elected in provincial constituencies by proportional representation using the largest remainder method with a Droop quota and open lists, while 12 councillors (elected in bloc) come from a "regional list", including the President-elect. One seat is reserved for the candidate who comes second. If a coalition wins more than 50% of the total seats in the council with PR, only 6 candidates from the regional list will be chosen and the number of those elected in provincial constituencies will be 54. If the winning coalition receives less than 40% of votes, special seats are added to the council to ensure a large majority for the President's coalition.

The council is elected for a five-year term, but, if the President suffers a vote of no confidence, resigns or dies, under the simul stabunt, simul cadent clause introduced in 1999 (literally they will stand together or they will fall together), also the council is dissolved and a snap election is called.

=== Current composition ===
The Regional Council of Campania is currently composed of the following political groups:

Party	Seats	Status
Democratic Party (PD)	10 / 51	In government
Brothers of Italy (FdI)	7 / 51	In opposition
Forza Italia (FI)	7 / 51	In opposition
Five Star Movement (M5S)	6 / 51	In government
Reformist House (IV–NdC)	5 / 51	In government
Head Held High (ATA)	4 / 51	In government
Italian Socialist Party (PSI)	3 / 51	In government
Fico for President	3 / 51	In government
League	2 / 51	In opposition
Greens and Left Alliance (AVS)	2 / 51	In government
Reformists and Moderates (ReM)	2 / 51	In opposition

By coalition:

Coalition	Seats	Status
Centre-left coalition	33 / 51	Government
Centre-right coalition	18 / 51	Opposition

== Local government ==
=== Provinces ===
Province / Metropolitan City	Inhabitants	President	Party	Election
Metropolitan City of Naples	2,954,847	Gaetano Manfredi (metropolitan mayor)	Ind.	2021
Avellino	393,093	Fausto Picone	IV	2026
Benevento	257,968	Nino Lombardi	NDC	2022
Caserta	909,493	Anacleto Colombiano	FI	2025
Salerno	1,053,786	Giuseppe Parente	PD	2026

=== Municipalities ===
Provincial capitals

Municipality	Inhabitants	Mayor	Party	Election
Avellino	54,080	Gianluca Festa	Civic	2019
Benevento	59,306	Clemente Mastella	Forza Italia	2016
Caserta	75,456	Carlo Marino	Democratic Party	2016
Naples	956,917	Gaetano Manfredi	Independent	2021
Salerno	133,557	Vincenzo Napoli	Democratic Party	2016

== Parties and elections ==
=== Latest regional election ===
In the latest regional election, which took place on 23–24 November 2025, Roberto Fico of the Five Star Movement was elected President by a landslide 60.6% of the vote.

23–24 November 2025 Campania regional election results
Candidates	Votes	%	Seats	Parties	Votes	%	Seats
Roberto Fico	1,286,188	60.63	1				
Roberto Fico	1,286,188	60.63	1	Democratic Party	370,016	18.41	10
Roberto Fico	1,286,188	60.63	1	Five Star Movement	183,333	9.12	5
Roberto Fico	1,286,188	60.63	1	Head Held High	167,569	8.34	4
Roberto Fico	1,286,188	60.63	1	Forward Campania	118,435	5.89	3
Roberto Fico	1,286,188	60.63	1	Reformist House	116,963	5.82	3
Roberto Fico	1,286,188	60.63	1	Fico for President	108,750	5.41	3
Roberto Fico	1,286,188	60.63	1	Greens and Left Alliance	93,596	4.66	2
Roberto Fico	1,286,188	60.63	1	Us of the Centre – We the South	71,260	3.55	2
Roberto Fico	1,286,188	60.63	1	Total	1,229,922	61.20	32
Edmondo Cirielli	757,836	35.72	1				
Edmondo Cirielli	757,836	35.72	1	Brothers of Italy	239,733	11.93	6
Edmondo Cirielli	757,836	35.72	1	Forza Italia	215,419	10.72	6
Edmondo Cirielli	757,836	35.72	1	League	110,735	5.51	3
Edmondo Cirielli	757,836	35.72	1	Cirielli for President – Moderates and Reformists	94,374	4.70	2
Edmondo Cirielli	757,836	35.72	1	Us Moderates	25,559	1.27	0
Edmondo Cirielli	757,836	35.72	1	Union of the Centre – Christian Democracy	9,771	0.49	0
Edmondo Cirielli	757,836	35.72	1	Christian Democracy with Rotondi	8,677	0.43	0
Edmondo Cirielli	757,836	35.72	1	Pensioners and Consumers	3,922	0.20	0
Edmondo Cirielli	757,836	35.72	1	Total	708,190	35.20	17
Giuliano Granato	43,055	2.03	0	Popular Campania	40,743	2.03	0
Nicola Campanile	20,235	0.95	0	For the People and the Community	19,843	0.99	0
Stefano Bandecchi	10,497	0.49	0	Bandecchi Dimension	8,522	0.42	0
Carlo Arnese	3,663	0.17	0	Force of the People	2,493	0.12	0
Blank and invalid votes	72,366	3.30					
Total candidates	2,121,474	100.0	2	Total parties	2,009,713	100.0	49
Registered voters/turnout	2,193,840	44.10					
Source: Campania Region – Results
