= Elections in Campania =

Italian regional elections

This page gathers the results of elections in Campania.

== Regional elections ==
=== Latest regional election ===
In the latest regional election, which took place on 23–24 November 2025, Roberto Fico of the Five Star Movement was elected President by a landslide 60.6% of the vote.

23–24 November 2025 Campania regional election results
Candidates	Votes	%	Seats	Parties	Votes	%	Seats
Roberto Fico	1,286,188	60.63	1				
Roberto Fico	1,286,188	60.63	1	Democratic Party	370,016	18.41	10
Roberto Fico	1,286,188	60.63	1	Five Star Movement	183,333	9.12	5
Roberto Fico	1,286,188	60.63	1	Head Held High	167,569	8.34	4
Roberto Fico	1,286,188	60.63	1	Forward Campania	118,435	5.89	3
Roberto Fico	1,286,188	60.63	1	Reformist House	116,963	5.82	3
Roberto Fico	1,286,188	60.63	1	Fico for President	108,750	5.41	3
Roberto Fico	1,286,188	60.63	1	Greens and Left Alliance	93,596	4.66	2
Roberto Fico	1,286,188	60.63	1	Us of the Centre – We the South	71,260	3.55	2
Roberto Fico	1,286,188	60.63	1	Total	1,229,922	61.20	32
Edmondo Cirielli	757,836	35.72	1				
Edmondo Cirielli	757,836	35.72	1	Brothers of Italy	239,733	11.93	6
Edmondo Cirielli	757,836	35.72	1	Forza Italia	215,419	10.72	6
Edmondo Cirielli	757,836	35.72	1	League	110,735	5.51	3
Edmondo Cirielli	757,836	35.72	1	Cirielli for President – Moderates and Reformists	94,374	4.70	2
Edmondo Cirielli	757,836	35.72	1	Us Moderates	25,559	1.27	0
Edmondo Cirielli	757,836	35.72	1	Union of the Centre – Christian Democracy	9,771	0.49	0
Edmondo Cirielli	757,836	35.72	1	Christian Democracy with Rotondi	8,677	0.43	0
Edmondo Cirielli	757,836	35.72	1	Pensioners and Consumers	3,922	0.20	0
Edmondo Cirielli	757,836	35.72	1	Total	708,190	35.20	17
Giuliano Granato	43,055	2.03	0	Popular Campania	40,743	2.03	0
Nicola Campanile	20,235	0.95	0	For the People and the Community	19,843	0.99	0
Stefano Bandecchi	10,497	0.49	0	Bandecchi Dimension	8,522	0.42	0
Carlo Arnese	3,663	0.17	0	Force of the People	2,493	0.12	0
Blank and invalid votes	72,366	3.30					
Total candidates	2,121,474	100.0	2	Total parties	2,009,713	100.0	49
Registered voters/turnout	2,193,840	44.10					
Source: Campania Region – Results

=== List of previous regional elections ===
- 1970 Campania regional election
- 1975 Campania regional election
- 1980 Campania regional election
- 1985 Campania regional election
- 1990 Campania regional election
- 1995 Campania regional election
- 2000 Campania regional election
- 2005 Campania regional election
- 2010 Campania regional election
- 2015 Campania regional election
- 2020 Campania regional election
