= Regional Council of Campania =

Legislative organ of Campania, Italy

Regional Council of Campania Consiglio regionale della Campania
- 12th Legislature
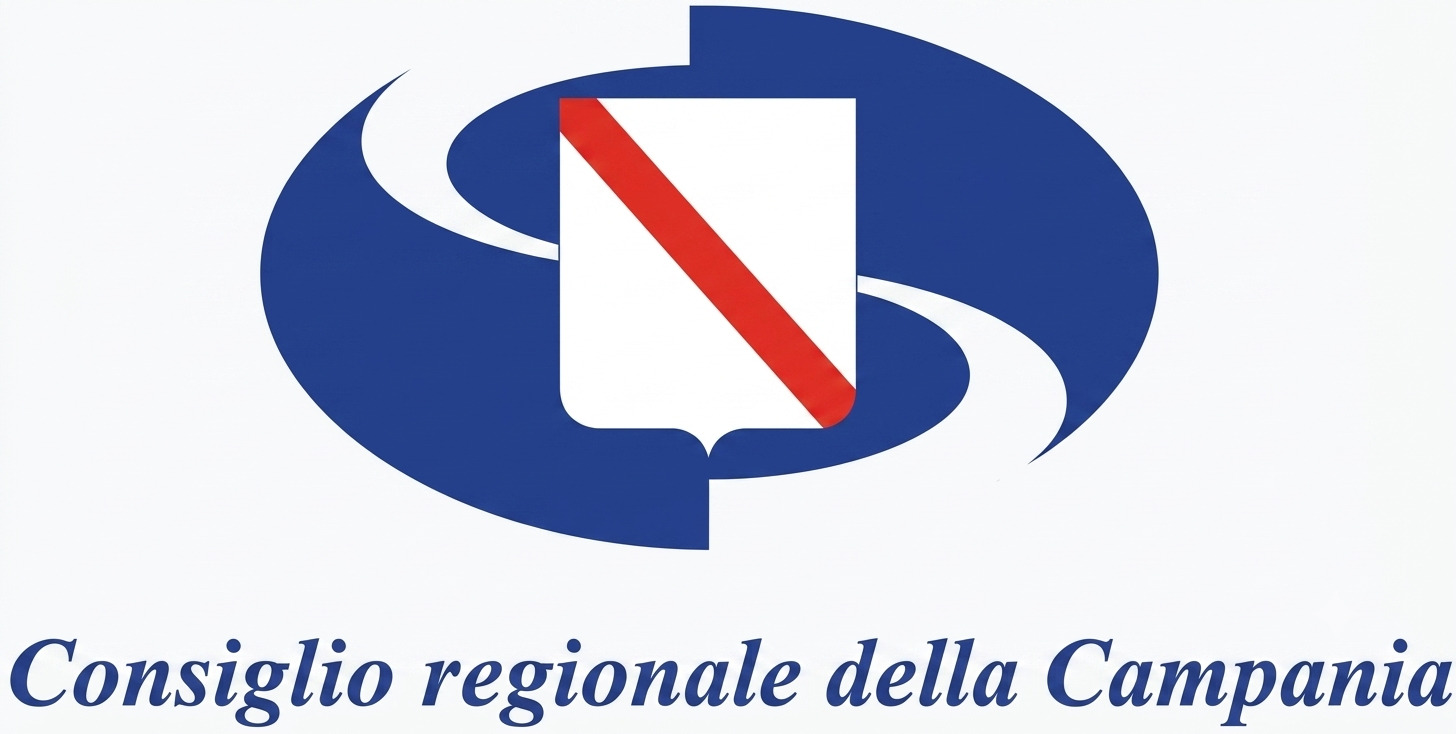

Type
- Type: Regional council Unicameral
- Established: 7 July 1970

Leadership
- President: Massimiliano Manfredi, PD since 29 December 2025

Structure
- Seats: 51
- Political groups: Government (33): PD (10); M5S (6); IV–NdC (5); ATA (4); PSI (3); Fico List (3); AVS (2); Opposition (18): FdI (7); FI (6); Lega (3); MeR (2)
- Length of term: 5 years

Elections
- Voting system: Party-list semi-proportional representation with majority bonus D'Hondt method
- Last election: 23 November 2025

Meeting place
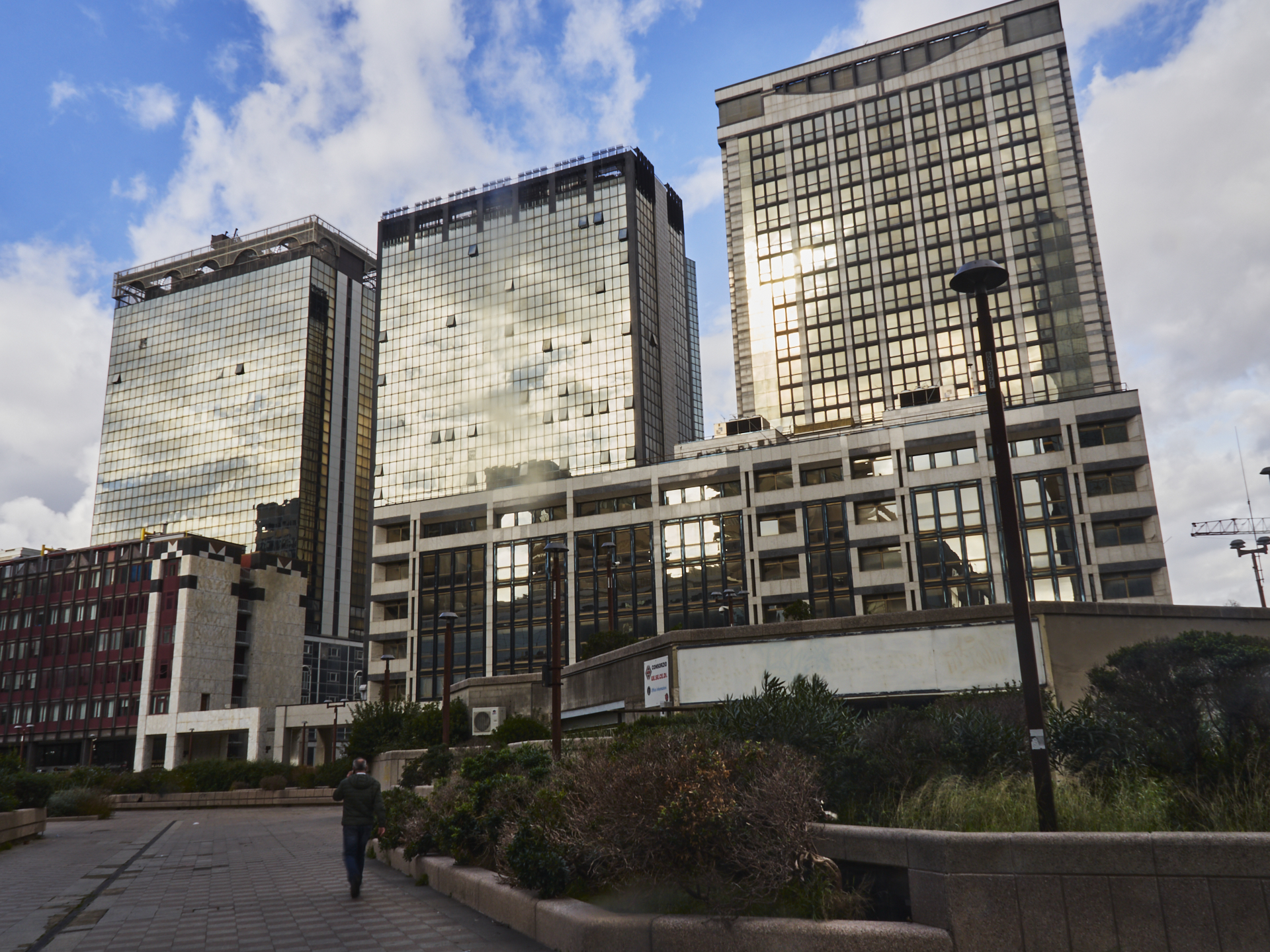
- Tower of the Regional Council of Campania, Centro Direzionale, Naples

Website
- cr.campania.it

The Regional Council of Campania (Italian: Consiglio Regionale della Campania) is the legislative assembly of Campania.

It was first elected in 1970, when the ordinary regions were instituted, on the basis of the Constitution of Italy of 1948.

== Composition ==
The Regional Council of Campania is composed of 51 members, of which 29 are elected in provincial constituencies with proportional representation, one is for the candidate for President who comes second, who usually becomes the leader of the opposition in the Council, and one is for the elected president.

The Council is elected for a five-year term, but, if the President suffers a vote of no confidence, resigns or dies, under the simul stabunt vel simul cadent clause (introduced in 1999), also the Council will be dissolved and there will be a snap election.

The Regional Council of Campania was originally composed of 60 regional councillors. Following the decree-law n. 138 of 13 August 2011, the number of regional councillors was reduced to 50, with an additional seat reserved for the President of the Region.

=== Political groups (2025–2030) ===
The Regional Council of Campania is currently composed of the following political groups:

Party	Seats	Status
Democratic Party (PD)	10 / 51	In government
Brothers of Italy (FdI)	7 / 51	In opposition
Forza Italia (FI)	7 / 51	In opposition
Five Star Movement (M5S)	6 / 51	In government
Reformist House (IV–NdC)	5 / 51	In government
Head Held High (ATA)	4 / 51	In government
Italian Socialist Party (PSI)	3 / 51	In government
Fico for President	3 / 51	In government
League	2 / 51	In opposition
Greens and Left Alliance (AVS)	2 / 51	In government
Reformists and Moderates (ReM)	2 / 51	In opposition

By coalition:

Coalition	Seats	Status
Centre-left coalition	33 / 51	Government
Centre-right coalition	18 / 51	Opposition

=== Historical composition ===
Election	DC	PCI	PSI	PLI	PRI	PSDI	MSI	Others	Total
7 June 1970	25	13	7	2	2	4	5	2	60
15 June 1975	23	16	6	1	2	4	7	1	60
8 June 1980	25	15	7	1	1	3	7	1	60
12 May 1985	24	14	9	1	2	3	5	2	60
6 May 1990	25	10	12	1	3	3	3	3	60

Election	Majority	Opposition	Council	President of the Region
23 April 1995	Centre-right (Pole for Freedoms) 36 / 60	Centre-left (The Olive Tree) 20 / 60 PPI 4 / 60		Antonio Rastrelli (1995–1999); Andrea Losco (1999–2000)
16 April 2000	Centre-left (The Olive Tree) 38 / 60	Centre-right (House of Freedoms) 22 / 60		Antonio Bassolino (2000–2010)
3 April 2005	Centre-left (The Union) 38 / 60	Centre-right (House of Freedoms) 22 / 60		Antonio Bassolino (2000–2010)
28 March 2010	Centre-right 38 / 60	Centre-left 22 / 60		Stefano Caldoro (2010–2015)
31 May 2015	Centre-left 31 / 51	Centre-right 13 / 51 M5S 7 / 51		Vincenzo De Luca (2015–2025)
20 September 2020	Centre-left 33 / 51	Centre-right 11 / 51 M5S 7 / 51		Vincenzo De Luca (2015–2025)
23 November 2025	Centre-left 33 / 51	Centre-right 18 / 51		Roberto Fico (since 2025)

== Presidents ==
This is a list of the Presidents of the Regional Council (Italian: Presidenti del Consiglio regionale):

Name	Period		Regional Legislature
Giuseppe Onofaro (MSI)	7 July 1970	13 July 1970	I (1970)
Antonio Gava (DC)	13 July 1970	30 November 1970	I (1970)
Galileo Barbirotti (PSI)	30 November 1970	26 November 1974	I (1970)
Francesco Porcelli (PSI)	26 November 1974	16 July 1975	I (1970)
Francesco Porcelli (PSI)	16 July 1975	12 August 1976	II (1975)
Mario Gomez d'Ayala (PCI)	12 August 1976	22 August 1979	II (1975)
Carlo Leone (DC)	22 August 1979	13 November 1979	II (1975)
Emilio De Feo (DC)	13 November 1979	9 July 1980	II (1975)
Mario Del Vecchio (PRI)	9 July 1980	30 September 1983	III (1980)
Giovanni Acocella (PSI)	30 September 1983	7 July 1985	III (1980)
Aniello De Chiara (PSI)	7 July 1985	9 July 1990	IV (1985)
Giovanni Sullutrone (PSI)	9 July 1990	7 June 1995	V (1990)
Paola Ambrosio (FI)	7 June 1995	8 October 1997	VI (1995)
Raffaele Calabrò (FI)	8 October 1997	27 June 2000	VI (1995)
Domenico Zinzi (UDEUR)	27 June 2000	4 May 2005	VII (2000)
Sandra Lonardo (UDEUR)	4 May 2005	12 May 2010	VIII (2005)
Paolo Romano (PdL)	12 May 2010	22 May 2014	IX (2010)
Pietro Foglia (UDC)	22 May 2014	24 July 2015	IX (2010)
Rosa D'Amelio (PD)	24 July 2015	26 October 2020	X (2015)
Gennaro Oliviero (PD)	26 October 2020	29 December 2025	XI (2020)
Massimiliano Manfredi (PD)	29 December 2025	Incumbent	XII (2025)

== See also ==
- Regional council
- Politics of Campania
- President of Campania
