= List of presidents of Campania =

This is the list of presidents of Campania (Italian: presidenti della Campania) since the office's creation in 1970.

Until the entry into force of Constitutional Law 1/1999, the President of Campania was elected, like the other members of the executive body of the Region, by the Regional Council, among its members. Since the 2000 regional election, the President of Campania is elected by universal and direct suffrage, appointing and revoking the other members of the regional council.

== Elected by the Regional Council (1970–1995) ==
#	Name	Term of office		Political party	Legislature
1	Carlo Leone	1970	1971	DC	I (1970)
2	Nicola Mancino (b. 1931)	1971	1972	DC	I (1970)
3	Alberto Servidio (1930–2017)	1972	1973	DC	I (1970)
4	Vittorio Cascetta (1928–1989)	1973	1975	DC	I (1970)
(2)	Nicola Mancino (b. 1931)	1975	1976	DC	II (1975)
5	Gaspare Russo (1927–2026)	1976	1979	DC	II (1975)
6	Ciro Cirillo (1921–2017)	1979	1980	DC	II (1975)
7	Emilio De Feo (1920–1987)	1980	1983	DC	III (1980)
8	Antonio Fantini (1936–2013)	1983	1985	DC	III (1980)
8	Antonio Fantini (1936–2013)	1985	1989	DC	IV (1985)
9	Ferdinando Clemente di San Luca (1925–2004)	1989	1990	DC	IV (1985)
9	Ferdinando Clemente di San Luca (1925–2004)	1990	1993	DC	V (1990)
10	Giovanni Grasso (1940–1999)	1993	1995	DC	V (1990)
11	Antonio Rastrelli (1927–2019)	8 June 1995	23 March 1999 (Note: Rastrelli was forced out of office by a motion of non-confidence voted by the Regional Council. The opposition leader Andrea Losco (PPI) was elected President by the Regional Council to end Rastrelli's term.)	AN	VI (1995)
12	Andrea Losco (b. 1951)	23 March 1999	18 May 2000	PPI	VI (1995)

== Directly-elected presidents (since 2000) ==
N.	Portrait	President	Term of office		Tenure (Years and days)	Party	Composition	Legislature
13		Antonio Bassolino (1947– )	18 May 2000	4 May 2005	9 years, 334 days	Democrats of the Left / Democratic Party	DS–PPI–UDEUR–Dem–SDI– PRC–RI–FdV–PdCI–PRI	VII (2000)
13		Antonio Bassolino (1947– )	4 May 2005	17 April 2010	9 years, 334 days	Democrats of the Left / Democratic Party	DL–DS–UDEUR–SDI– PRC–FdV–PdCI–IdV–PRI	VIII (2005)
14		Stefano Caldoro (1960– )	17 April 2010	18 June 2015	5 years, 62 days	The People of Freedom / Forza Italia	PdL–UDC–NS–UDEUR–LD	IX (2010)
15		Vincenzo De Luca (1949– )	18 June 2015	9 October 2020	10 years, 174 days	Democratic Party	PD–CD–SC–UDC–PSI–IdV	X (2015)
15		Vincenzo De Luca (1949– )	9 October 2020	9 December 2025	10 years, 174 days	Democratic Party	PD–IV–Pop–NC–LD–CD– PSI–Eu–EV	XI (2020)
16		Roberto Fico (1974– )	9 December 2025	Incumbent	205 days	Five Star Movement	PD–M5S–ATA–PSI–IV–AVS–NdC	XII (2025)
