= Andrea Cozzolino =

Italian politician (born 1962)

Andrea Cozzolino MEP
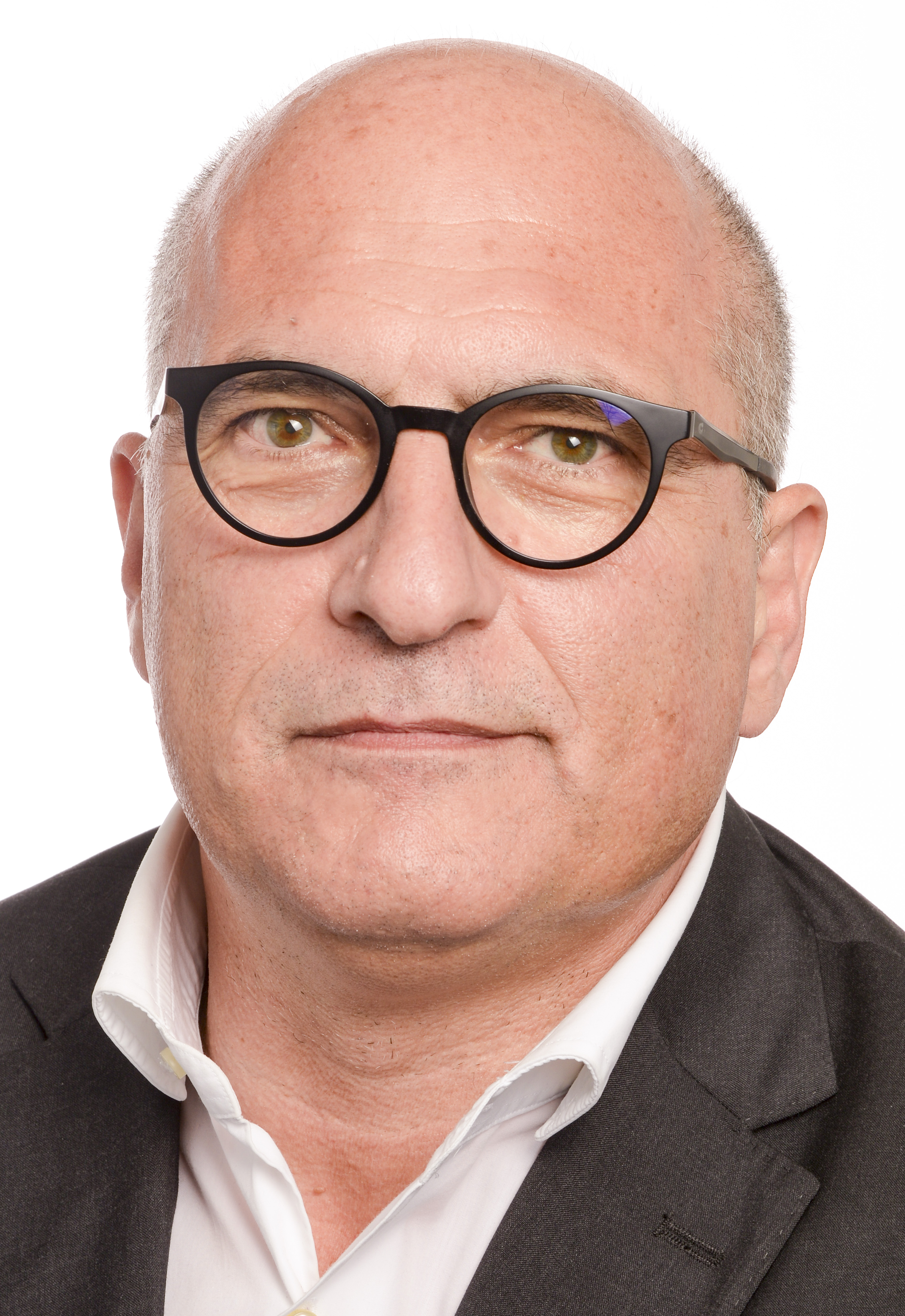

Member of the European Parliament for Southern Italy
- In office 14 July 2009 – 15 July 2024

Personal details
- Born: 3 August 1962 (age 63) Naples, Italy
- Party: PD (since 2007)
- Other political affiliations: PCI (till 1991); PDS (1991–1998); DS (1998–2007); S&D (since 2009); PES (since 2014)
- Spouse: Anna Normale
- Children: 3

Andrea Cozzolino (born 3 August 1962) is an Italian politician who is serving as a Member of the European Parliament (MEP) since 2009. Cozzolino began his political career in the 1970s with the Italian Communist Youth Federation (FGCI). He then joined the Italian Communist Party (PCI) and its legal successor parties, including the Democratic Party of the Left (PDS), the Democrats of the Left (DS), and the Democratic Party (PD). From 2005 to 2009, he was Assessor for Agriculture and Productive Activities in the Campania region.

Cozzolini was re-elected as MEP in 2014 and 2019. In the European Parliament, Cozzolino served on the Committee on Regional Development since 2014. In 2019, he also joined the Subcommittee on Human Rights. Previously, Cozzolino had been a member of the Committee on Budgetary Control (2009–2012), the Committee on Budgets (2009–2013), and the Committee on Petitions (2014–2019). In addition to his committee assignments, Cozzolino was part of the European Parliament's delegations for relations with the Mashriq countries (2014–2019), the Maghreb countries, and the Arab Maghreb Union (2019–2023).

== Early life and education ==
Cozzolini was born and raised in Naples. He attended the liceo scientifico in Torre del Greco, where he obtained his diploma. It was during this period that he began his political activity.

== Career ==
At the end of the 1970s during his high school years in Torre del Greco, Cozzolini was among the founders of the Association of Neapolitan students against the Camorra. He joined the FGCI, the youth organization of the PCI, and became its secretary of Naples from 1983 to 1986; he later became the party's responsible for Southern Italy. During the early 1990s, he participated as a leader of the PCI in the process that led to the turning point of the Bolognina by Achille Occhetto and the formation of the PDS, and subsequently joined the DS led by Massimo D'Alema. From 1994 to 2000, he was secretary of the PDS/DS of Naples. In the 2000 Campania regional election, Cozzolino ran with the DS in support of the then Naples mayor Antonio Bassolino, being elected in the Naples constituency in the Regional Council of Campania. In the 2005 Campania regional election, he was re-elected in the same constituency, where he was subsequently appointed Assessor with regional delegations for Agriculture and Productive Activities in the council of Bassolino, who had become the president of Campania in 2000 and had been re-elected in 2005. During his term as councilor in the region, he participated in person in the process of implementing European funds in the territories and observed their positive impact on the lives of citizens. In the primaries of 14 October 2007, Cozzolino was elected to the National Constituent Assembly of the PD.

In the 2009 European Parliament election in Italy, Cozzolino was elected to the European Parliament for the PD in the Southern Italy constituency with 136,859 preferences, resulting the most voted candidate of the electoral list; owing to his almost 140,000 votes garnered for his election, the press nicknamed him "Mr. Preferences". As a result of his election as MEP, he left the position of regional councilor, where he was replaced for Agriculture by Gianfranco Nappi and for Productive Activities by Riccardo Marone, former right-hand man of Bassolino at the municipality of Naples. Cozzolino was a member of the Committee on Budgetary Control until 2012 and a member of the Committee on Budgets until 2013. Having run in the primaries of the centre-left coalition for mayor of Naples on 23 January 2011, he won in an upset with 16,358 votes, or 37.3% of the total votes, mainly obtained between Secondigliano and Milan. Against this result, an appeal was presented to the guarantors by the other contenders (Umberto Ranieri, Libero Mancuso, and Nicola Oddati). The primaries were annulled in late 2011 following the reports of fraud and investigations by the Anti-Mafia Investigation Division for Camorra infiltration of the Lo Russo clan, and Mario Morcone (prefect and commissioner for Rome in 2008) was chosen as candidate for mayor after being proposed by the PD's provincial commissioner Andrea Orlando.

In 2014 European Parliament election in Italy, Cozzolino ran again with the PD in the Southern constituency. He was elected with 115,297 preferences, resulting fifth of his party in the constituency. He was appointed vice-president of the Committee on Regional Development, and was also a member of the Committee on Petitions. In 2015, Cozzolini was the candidate of the official secretariat in the primaries of the centre-left coalition for the designation of the presidential candidate for the Campania region. He came in second with 44%, behind the then Salerno mayor Vincenzo De Luca, who won the candidacy with 52%. In July 2018, Cozzolino was appointed rapporteur for the European Parliament on the proposal for a Regulation on the Regional Development Fund for 2021–2027 and on the Cohesion Fund.

In the 2019 European Parliament election in Italy, Cozzolino was again re-elected in third place with 81,328 preferences. He joined the Subcommittee on Human Rights and the European Parliament's delegation for relations with the Maghreb countries and the Arab Maghreb Union. Cozzolino voted against the European Parliament resolution of 23 November 2022 on recognising the Russian Federation as a state sponsor of terrorism following its actions during the Russian invasion of Ukraine. The European Parliament approved the motion, and Cozzolino was one of four Italian parliamentarians (the others were Pietro Bartolo, Francesca Donato, and Massimiliano Smeriglio) to vote against it on the grounds that the resolution would risk pushing a peace dialogue further away and hamper calls for ceasefire. (Note: For the approved motion, see "Texts adopted – Recognising the Russian Federation as a state sponsor of terrorism – Wednesday, 23 November 2022". European Parliament. 23 November 2022.) On 16 December 2022, the National Commission of Guarantee of the PD decided to cautiously suspend Cozzolino from the party "until the closure of the ongoing investigations by the judiciary related to the 'Qatargate' scandal", which allegedly involved corruption in the European Parliament. After the announcement by Brando Benifei, the PD's Party Leader in the European Parliament, of the party's vote in favour of the request for a waiver of parliamentary immunity for MEPs Cozzolino and Marc Tarabella, as had been requested by the Belgian Prosecutor's Office and supported by the European Parliament president Roberta Metsola, Cozzolino declared his intention to renounce it. (Note: For the announcement of the immunity revocation, see "Il Parlamento revoca l'immunità dei deputati Cozzolino e Tarabella" (in Italian). European Parliament. 2 February 2023.) On 12 January 2023, Cozzolino resigned all commission posts and withdrew his amendments; in line with what he previously stated, he voted in favour of the request for a waiver of immunity, which was approved by the European Parliament on 2 February 2023.

== Qatargate ==
Since January 2023, Cozzolino was under house arrest in Naples pending a hearing to see whether he would be sent to serve the remainder of his sentence in a Belgian jail. The hearing was scheduled to take place on 11 April 2023. Following his involvement in the Qatargate, as a result of an international arrest warrant issued by the Belgian Prosecutor's Office, he was arrested on 10 February 2023 and taken to Poggioreale prison by the Guardia di Finanza's Organised Crime Investigation Group. According to the charges, Cozzolino, who was a long-time chairman of the delegation for relations with the Maghreb countries and the European Union–Morocco joint parliamentary committees of the European Parliament, had allegedly received money and gifts from the Moroccan ambassador to Poland in exchange for a policy favourable to those countries in the European Parliament.

Cozzolino's name had first emerged when his assistant Francesco Giorgi, Eva Kaili's partner, was arrested as part of the same investigation. In a press release issued after the arrest of Giorgi in December 2022, Cozzolino declared that he was "deeply outraged by the judicial events ... which strongly undermine the credibility of the European institutions", and stated that he was "completely unrelated to the investigations". After spending four months under house arrest, the Court of Appeal of Naples revoked the arrests on 15 June 2023. Four days later, he was placed under arrest as soon as he arrived in Brussels for questioning, and was released two days later. On 21 June 2023, Cozzolino was charged by a Belgian court with bribery, membership of a criminal organisation, and money laundering, which he denied, and was conditionally released from house arrest.

== Personal life ==
Cozzolino is married to Anna Normale, with whom he has three children.
