= Alfonso Pecoraro Scanio =

Italian politician (born 1959)

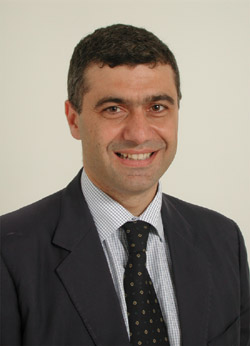

Minister of the Environment
- In office 17 May 2006 – 8 May 2008
- Prime Minister: Romano Prodi
- Preceded by: Altero Matteoli
- Succeeded by: Stefania Prestigiacomo

Minister of Agriculture
- In office 25 April 2000 – 11 July 2001
- Prime Minister: Giuliano Amato
- Preceded by: Paolo De Castro
- Succeeded by: Giovanni Alemanno

Member of the Chamber of Deputies
- In office 23 April 1992 – 28 April 2008
- Constituency: Naples (1992–2006); Campania (2006–2008)

Personal details
- Born: 13 March 1959 (age 67) Salerno, Italy
- Party: Federation of the Greens
- Education: University of Salerno
- Profession: Lawyer

Alfonso Pecoraro Scanio (born 13 March 1959) is an Italian politician, lawyer, and journalist who was a member of the Chamber of Deputies from 1992 to 2008. He also served as Minister of Agriculture in the second government of Giuliano Amato from 2001 to 2001 and as Minister of the Environment in the second government of Romano Prodi from 2006 to 2008.

== Political career ==
Pecoraro Scanio was born on 13 March 1959 in Salerno. In the 1992 Italian general election, he was elected to the Italian Parliament as member of the Chamber of Deputies. He was the leader of the Federation of the Greens (FdV), one of the parties making up the ruling coalition in the new Italian government. He served as Minister for Agriculture from 2000 to 2001 in the second Amato government. He was one of the candidates as leader of The Union for the primary election held on 16 October 2005, finishing in fifth place with 2.2% of national votes. He remained a member of the Chamber of Deputies until the 2008 Italian general election lost by the centre-left coalition. During his political career, Pecoraro Scanio has been accused of populistic and opportunistic behaviour for his position on the major waste disposal problem in Naples, which is part of his electoral region in Campania.

== Personal life ==
Pecoraro Scanio is openly bisexual. He has a younger brother, Marco Pecoraro Scanio, who is a former Serie A footballer with such clubs as Inter Milan, Salernitana, and Ancona. Pecorario Scanio's brother also joined the Italian Parliament as a member of the Senate of the Republic for the FdV when he was elected in the 2006 Italian election won for The Union. Pecoraro Scanio is president of the UniVerde Foundation and teaches at both the University of Milan Bicocca and the Tor Vergata University of Rome.

== Electoral history ==
Election	House	Constituency	Party	Votes	Result
1985	Regional Council of Campania	Salerno	LV	1,169	Not elected
1990	Regional Council of Campania	Naples	FdV	8,901	Elected
1992	Chamber of Deputies	Naples–Caserta	FdV	3,788	Elected
1994	Chamber of Deputies	Naples – Arenella	FdV	34,961	Elected
1996	Chamber of Deputies	Naples – Arenella	FdV	41,470	Elected
2001	Chamber of Deputies	Naples – Arenella	FdV	32,014	Elected
2006	Chamber of Deputies	Campania 1	FdV	– (Note: Candidate in a closed list proportional representation system.)	Elected
2008	Chamber of Deputies	Apulia	SA	–	Not elected
