= 2000 Italian regional elections =

- 16 April 2000

Presidents and regional assemblies of Piedmont, Lombardy, Veneto, Liguria, Emilia-Romagna, Tuscany, Marche, Umbria, Lazio, Campania, Molise, Abruzzo, Apulia, Basilicata and Calabria
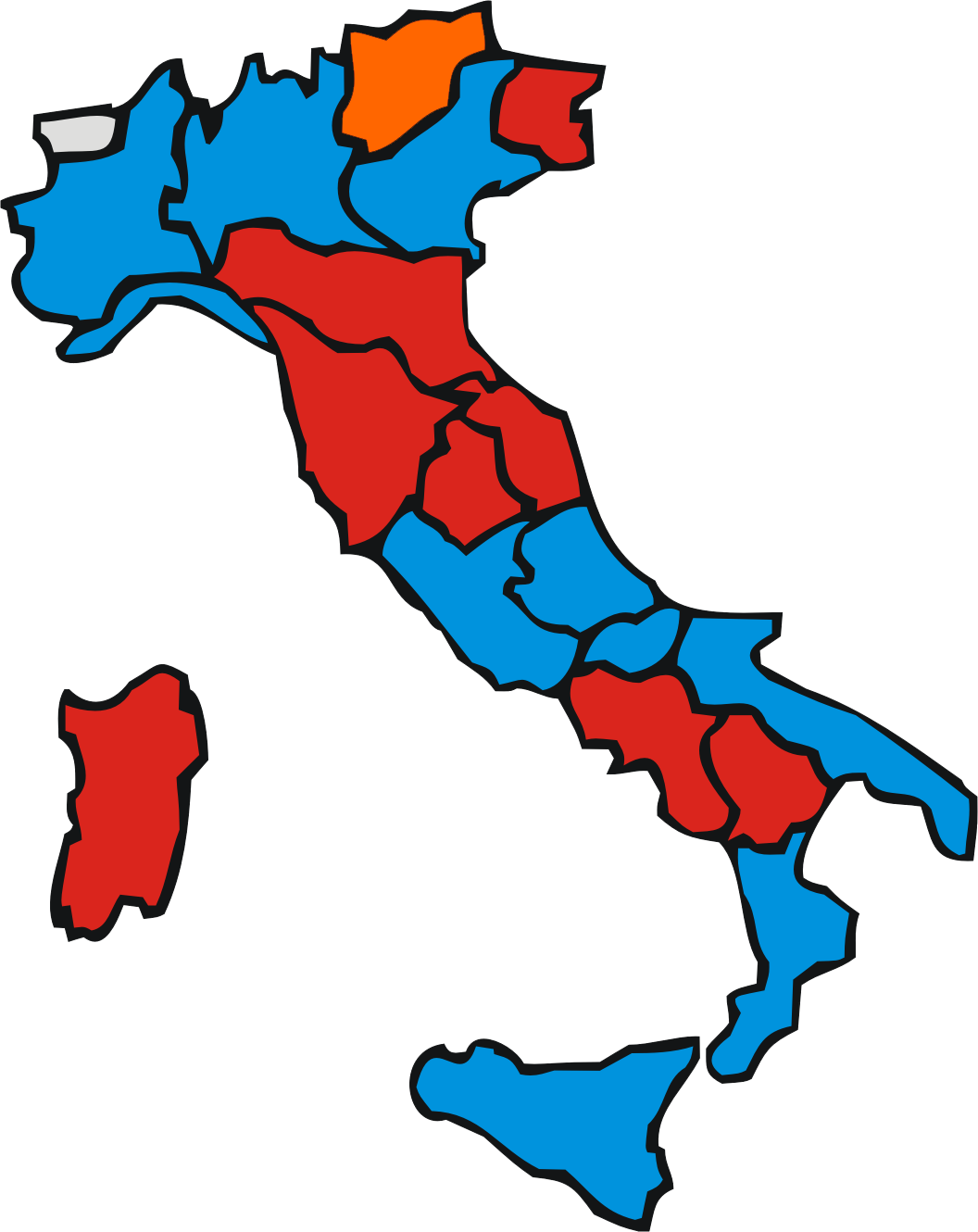
- Elected Presidents: Pole for Freedoms The Olive Tree

The Italian regional elections of 2000 were held on 16 April.

For the very first time, following the 1999 constitutional reform, the presidents of the Regions were directly elected by citizens. Alongside this change, a new provision was introduced: the President is elected for a five-year term, but if during the term they face a vote of no confidence, resign, or die, under the simul stabunt, simul cadent clause (literally, “they will stand together or they will fall together”), the regional council is also dissolved, and a snap election is called.

Following the electoral defeat suffered by the centre-left coalition, Massimo D'Alema resigned as Prime Minister.

== Coalitions ==
After losing the 1996 general election, Silvio Berlusconi was able to form a new centre-right coalition, once again including the Northern League in the alliance.

== Overall results ==
=== Regional councils ===
Alliance	Votes	%	Seats
Centre-right coalition (House of Freedoms)	12,538,710	49.33	381 / 736
Centre-left coalition (The Olive Tree)	10,871,852	42.78	348 / 736
Others	2,004,321	7.88	7 / 736
Total	25,414,883	100	736 / 736
Source: Ministry of the Interior

=== Presidents of the regions ===
Region	Outgoing			Elected			Election
Region	President	Party	Alliance	President	Party	Alliance	Election
Piedmont	Enzo Ghigo	FI	Centre-right	Enzo Ghigo	FI	Centre-right	Details
Liguria	Giancarlo Mori	PPI	Centre-left	Sandro Biasotti	FI	Centre-right	Details
Lombardy	Roberto Formigoni	FI	Centre-right	Roberto Formigoni	FI	Centre-right	Details
Veneto	Giancarlo Galan	FI	Centre-right	Giancarlo Galan	FI	Centre-right	Details
Emilia-Romagna	Vasco Errani	DS	Centre-left	Vasco Errani	DS	Centre-left	Details
Tuscany	Vannino Chiti	DS	Centre-left	Claudio Martini	DS	Centre-left	Details
Umbria	Bruno Bracalente	DS	Centre-left	Maria Rita Lorenzetti	DS	Centre-left	Details
Marche	Vito D'Ambrosio	DS	Centre-left	Vito D'Ambrosio	DS	Centre-left	Details
Lazio	Piero Badaloni	Ind	Centre-left	Francesco Storace	AN	Centre-right	Details
Abruzzo	Antonio Falconio	PPI	Centre-left	Giovanni Pace	AN	Centre-right	Details
Molise	Marcello Veneziale	DS	Centre-left	Giovanni Di Stasi	DS	Centre-left	Details
Campania	Andrea Losco	PPI	Centre-left	Antonio Bassolino	DS	Centre-left	Details
Basilicata	Raffaele Dinardo	PPI	Centre-left	Filippo Bubbico	DS	Centre-left	Details
Apulia	Salvatore Distaso	FI	Centre-right	Raffaele Fitto	FI	Centre-right	Details
Calabria	Luigi Meduri	PPI	Centre-left	Giuseppe Chiaravalloti	FI	Centre-right	Details

== Summary by region ==
=== Piedmont ===
President				Regional council			
Candidate	Party	Votes	%	Alliance	Votes	%	Seats
Enzo Ghigo	FI	1,249,840	51.8	Centre-right	1,139,387	55.9	40
Livia Turco	DS	953,163	39.5	Centre-left	771,087	37.9	18
Emma Bonino	LB	138,632	5.7	LB	90,796	4.5	2
Others		71,912	3.0	Others	35,137	1.7	0
Voters: 2,641,647 — Turnout: 72.0%

=== Lombardy ===
President				Regional council			
Candidate	Party	Votes	%	Alliance	Votes	%	Seats
Roberto Formigoni	FI	3,355,803	62.4	Centre-right	2,995,439	65.8	51
Mino Martinazzoli	PPI	1,692,474	31.5	Centre-left	1,294,434	28.4	26
Benedetto Della Vedova	LB	178,406	3.3	LB	154,396	3.4	3
Others		153,898	2.86	Others	111,377	2.4	0
Voters: 5,742,208 — Turnout: 75.6%

=== Veneto ===
President				Regional council			
Candidate	Party	Votes	%	Alliance	Votes	%	Seats
Giancarlo Galan	FI	1,484,585	55.0	Centre-right	1,382,963	60.3	37
Massimo Cacciari	Dem	1,032,255	38.2	Centre-left	769,534	33.6	23
Others		184,310	6.7	Others	139,860	6.1	0
Voters: 2,910,001 — Turnout: 75.6%

=== Liguria ===
President				Regional council			
Candidate	Party	Votes	%	Alliance	Votes	%	Seats
Sandro Biasotti	FI	475,308	50.7	Centre-right	451,500	51.1	24
Giancarlo Mori	PPI	431,743	46.1	Centre-left	406,889	46.1	16
Others		30,196	3.2	Others	24,435	2.8	0
Voters: 1,012,539 — Turnout: 70.5%

=== Emilia-Romagna ===
President				Regional council			
Candidate	Party	Votes	%	Alliance	Votes	%	Seats
Vasco Errani	DS	1,451,468	56.5	Centre-left	1,358,259	56.4	33
Gabriele Cané	FI	1,036,660	40.3	Centre-right	977.841	40.6	17
Others		82,102	3.2	Others	71,691	3.0	0
Voters: 2,738,319 — Turnout: 79.7%

=== Tuscany ===
President				Regional council			
Candidate	Party	Votes	%	Alliance	Votes	%	Seats
Claudio Martini	DS	1,029,142	49.3	Centre-left	984,897	50.3	32
Altero Matteoli	AN	839,001	40.0	Centre-right	794,555	40.6	16
Niccolò Pecorini	PRC	159,862	7.7	PRC	131,471	6.7	2
Others		62,308	3.0	Others	47,218	2.4	0
Voters: 2,263,992 — Turnout: 74.6%

=== Umbria ===
President				Regional council			
Candidate	Party	Votes	%	Alliance	Votes	%	Seats
Maria Rita Lorenzetti	DS	286,588	56.4	Centre-left	279,194	57.9	20
Maurizio Ronconi	CCD	199,215	39.2	Centre-right	187,867	39.0	10
Others		22,266	4.4	Others	14,943	3.1	0
Voters: 547,733 — Turnout: 76.8%

=== Marche ===
President				Regional council			
Candidate	Party	Votes	%	Alliance	Votes	%	Seats
Vito D'Ambrosio	DS	429,288	49.9	Centre-left	406,865	50.2	25
Maurizio Bertucci	FI	380,116	44.2	Centre-right	367,421	45.4	15
Others		50,630	5.9	Others	35,531	4.4	0
Voters: 938,848 — Turnout: 74.3%

=== Lazio ===
President				Regional council			
Candidate	Party	Votes	%	Alliance	Votes	%	Seats
Francesco Storace	AN	1,553,562	51.3	Centre-right	1,449,719	53.2	38
Piero Badaloni	Ind	1,392,190	46.0	Centre-left	1,208,665	44.4	22
Others		83,049	2.7	Others	65,936	2.4	0
Voters: 3,212,420 — Turnout: 71.6%

=== Abruzzo ===
President				Regional council			
Candidate	Party	Votes	%	Alliance	Votes	%	Seats
Giovanni Pace	AN	382,353	49.3	Centre-right	364,776	49.3	26
Antonio Falconio	PPI	378,739	48.8	Centre-left	363,718	49.1	17
Others		15,049	1.9	Others	12,227	1.6	0
Voters: 835,348 — Turnout: 70.6%

=== Molise ===
President				Regional council			
Candidate	Party	Votes	%	Alliance	Votes	%	Seats
Giovanni Di Stasi	DS	101,295	49.0	Centre-left	95,859	47.9	18
Michele Iorio	FI	100,365	48.6	Centre-right	100,854	50.4	12
Others		4,988	2.4	Others	3,515	1.7	0
Voters: 219,319 — Turnout: 67.3%

=== Campania ===
President				Regional council			
Candidate	Party	Votes	%	Alliance	Votes	%	Seats
Antonio Bassolino	DS	1,654,777	54.2	Centre-left	1,537,893	53.6	35
Antonio Rastrelli	AN	1,350,621	44.2	Centre-right	1,297,460	45.2	22
Others		48,656	1.6	Others	32,339	1.1	0
Voters: 3,317,112 — Turnout: 69.5%

=== Basilicata ===
President				Regional council			
Candidate	Party	Votes	%	Alliance	Votes	%	Seats
Filippo Bubbico	DS	227,919	63.2	Centre-left	243.660	69,7	21
Nicola Pagliuca	FI	126,530	35.1	Centre-right	102.061	29,2	9
Others		6,389	1.7	Others	3,699	1.1	0
Voters: 387,543 — Turnout: 72.7%

=== Apulia ===
President				Regional council			
Candidate	Party	Votes	%	Alliance	Votes	%	Seats
Raffaele Fitto	FI	1,194,370	54.0	Centre-right	1,109,270	54.3	38
Giannicola Sinisi	Dem	961,642	43.4	Centre-left	892,923	43.7	22
Others		57,119	2.6	Others	40,576	2.0	0
Voters: 2,423,500 — Turnout: 70.2%

=== Calabria ===
President				Regional council			
Candidate	Party	Votes	%	Alliance	Votes	%	Seats
Giuseppe Chiaravalloti	FI	545,186	49.8	Centre-right	533,075	50.1	26
Nuccio Fava	PPI	532,222	48.7	Centre-left	521,922	49.0	17
Others		16,253	1.5	Others	9,749	0.9	0
Voters: 1,176,428 — Turnout: 64.6%
