= Sergio Rastrelli =

Italian politician (born 1966)

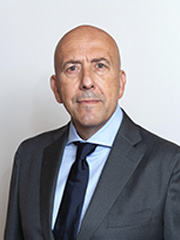
- Rastrelli in 2022

Member of the Senate of the Republic
- Incumbent
- Assumed office 13 October 2022
- Constituency: Campania

Personal details
- Born: 17 January 1966 (age 60)
- Party: Brothers of Italy
- Parent: Antonio Rastrelli (father)

Sergio Rastrelli (born 17 January 1966) is an Italian politician of Brothers of Italy who was elected member of the Senate of the Republic in 2022. He is the son of Antonio Rastrelli.

== Biography ==
Born in Naples but residing in Avellino, son of Maria Liliana Scaramella and Antonio Rastrelli, politician and member of the Italian Social Movement and National Alliance, senator, deputy, undersecretary of the treasury in Berlusconi's first government, and president of the Campania Region from 1995 to 1999; he practices law as a cassation lawyer with a Lawyer firm of the same name.

A member of Brothers of Italy (FdI), after being proposed as the Centre-right politics candidate for mayor of Naples as an alternative to former prosecutor Catello Maresca, in September 2021 he was appointed by party president Giorgia Meloni as city manager of Naples.

In the early general elections of 2022, he was nominated as a candidate for the Senate of the Republic (Italy), third on the FdI list in the Campania 1 multi-member constituency, and was elected senator. In the 19th legislature, he was secretary of both the 2nd Justice Committee and the Parliamentary Anti-Mafia Committee, as well as a member of the Committee on Elections and Parliamentary Immunities, the Parliamentary Committee for Indictment Proceedings, the Parliamentary Committee for Simplification, and the Guarantee Council.

In October 2025, ahead of the 2025 Campania regional election, he was appointed city commissioner for Fratelli d'Italia in Naples.
