= 1995 Campania regional election =

- 23 April 1995

All 48 seats to the Regional Council
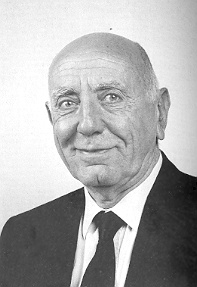

	Majority party	Minority party
Leader	Antonio Rastrelli	Giovanni Vacca
Party	National Alliance	Independent
Alliance	Centre-right	Centre-left
Seats won	24	20
Popular vote	1,408,463	1,159,539
Percentage	47.86%	39.30%
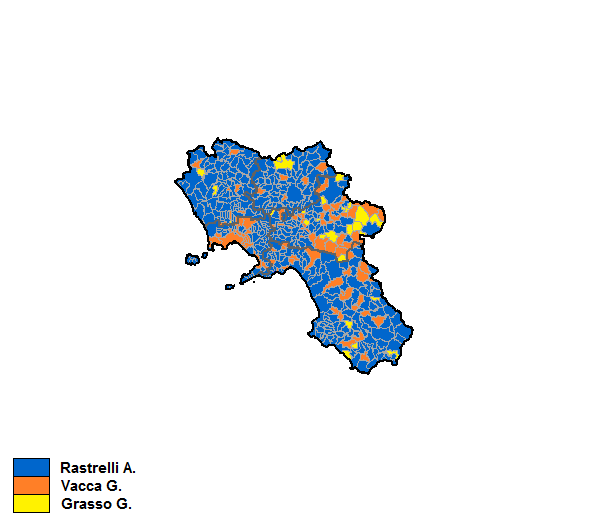
President before election
Giovanni Grasso
Italian People's Party
Subsequent President
Antonio Rastrelli
National Alliance

The Campania regional election of 1995 took place on 23 April 1995.

Antonio Rastrelli (National Alliance) was elected President of the Region, defeating Giovanni Vacca (Democratic Party of the Left) and incumbent Giovanni Grasso (Italian People's Party).

For the first time the President of the Region was directly elected by the people, although the election was not yet binding and the President-elect could have been replaced during the term. This is precisely what happened in 1999, when a centre-left majority supported by dissidents of the centre-right, who had formed the Democratic Union for the Republic, ousted Rastrelli and replaced him with centre-right dissident Andrea Losco.

== Results ==
23 April 1995 Campania regional election results
Candidates	Votes	%	Seats	Parties	Votes	%	Seats
Antonio Rastrelli	1,408,463	47.86	12				
Antonio Rastrelli	1,408,463	47.86	12	Forza Italia – The People's Pole	503,042	18.87	10
Antonio Rastrelli	1,408,463	47.86	12	National Alliance	487,291	18.28	9
Antonio Rastrelli	1,408,463	47.86	12	Christian Democratic Centre	259,380	9.73	5
Antonio Rastrelli	1,408,463	47.86	12	Total	1,249,713	46.87	24
Giovanni Vacca	1,159,539	39.30	–				
Giovanni Vacca	1,159,539	39.30	–	Democratic Party of the Left	521,135	19.55	10
Giovanni Vacca	1,159,539	39.30	–	Communist Refoundation Party	246,170	9.23	4
Giovanni Vacca	1,159,539	39.30	–	Pact of Democrats	147,948	5.55	3
Giovanni Vacca	1,159,539	39.30	–	Federation of the Greens	78,277	2.94	1
Giovanni Vacca	1,159,539	39.30	–	Democratic Project	68,516	2.57	1
Giovanni Vacca	1,159,539	39.30	–	Italian Republican Party	30,524	1.14	1
Giovanni Vacca	1,159,539	39.30	–	Total	1,092,570	40.98	20
Giovanni Grasso	237,162	8.06	–	Italian People's Party	220,557	8.27	4
Pino Rauti	48,718	1.66	–	Tricolour Flame	33,633	1.26	–
Domenico Pinto	47,795	1.60	–				
Domenico Pinto	47,795	1.60	–	Pannella List	27,460	1.03	–
Domenico Pinto	47,795	1.60	–	Union of the Centre	10,601	0.40	–
Domenico Pinto	47,795	1.60	–	Total	38,061	1.43	–
Antonio D'Acunto	32,053	1.09	–	Greens Rights Environment Work Rainbow	22,723	0.85	–
Gennaro Nardi	13,009	0.44	–	Federal Italy League	8,849	0.33	–
Total candidates	2,943,139	100.00	12	Total parties	2,666,106	100.00	48
Source: Ministry of the Interior
