= 2010 Campania regional election =

- 28–29 March 2010

All 60 seats to the Regional Council
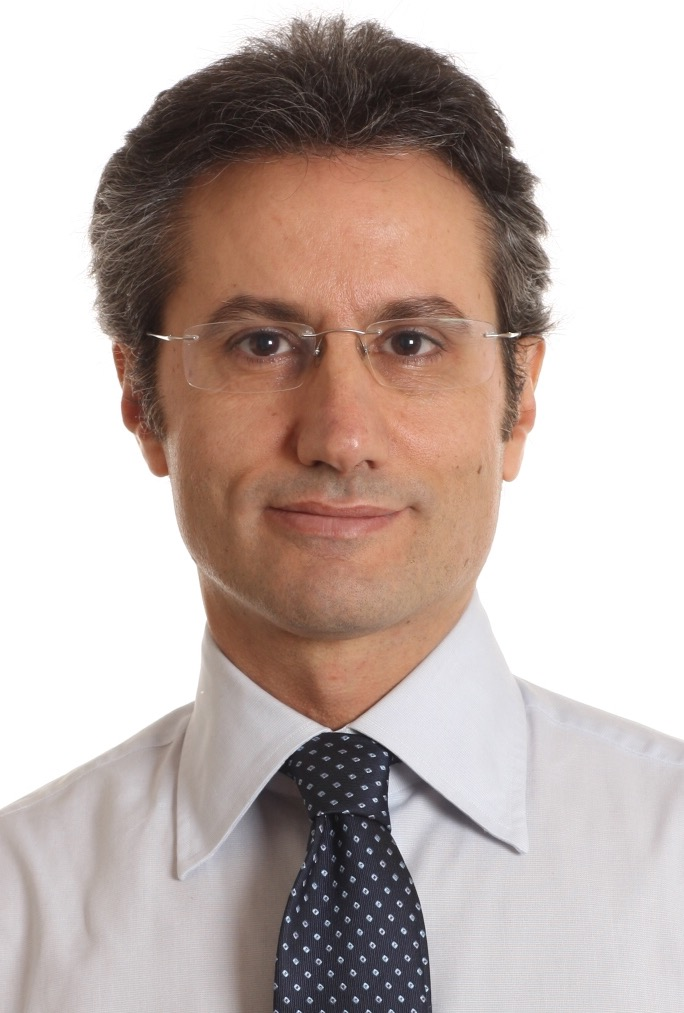

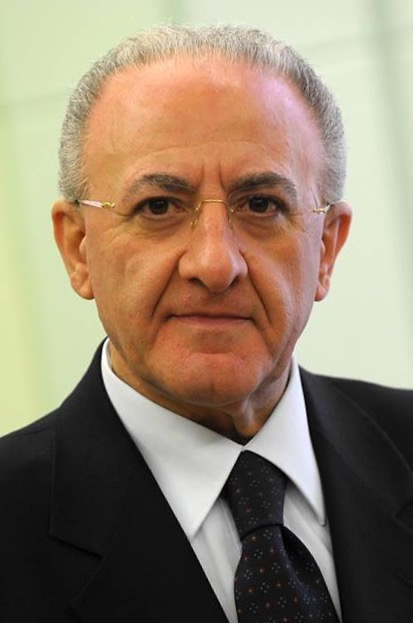
	Majority party	Minority party
Leader	Stefano Caldoro	Vincenzo De Luca
Party	People of Freedom	Democratic Party
Alliance	Centre-right	Centre-left
Last election	22 seats, 34.4%	38 seats, 61.6%
Seats won	38	22
Seat change	▲16	▼16
Popular vote	1,579,566	1,252,360
Percentage	54.27%	43.03%
Swing	▲18.89%	▼18.53%
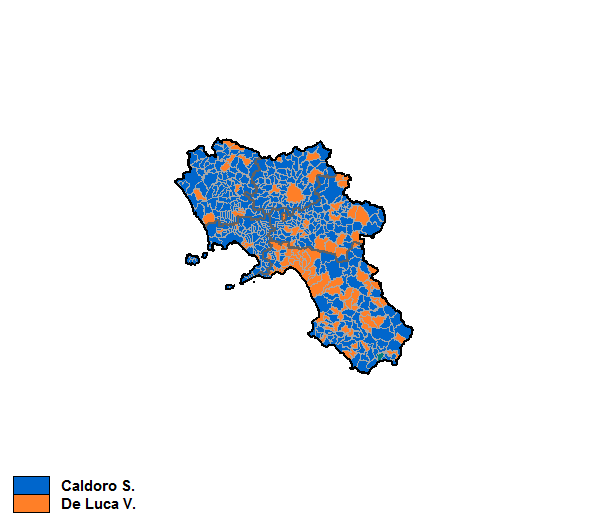
President before election
Antonio Bassolino
Democratic Party
President
Stefano Caldoro
People of Freedom

The Campania regional election of 2010 took place on 28–29 March 2010.

The region came out from ten years of undisputed dominance by the centre-left led by Antonio Bassolino (DS). A former Mayor of Naples and minister, he was re-elected by a landslide 61.6% of the vote in 2005. However, in his second term in office, Bassolino highly disappointed voters and the whole Italy for his bad management of waste and the subsequent crisis.

The centre-left filed as candidate Vincenzo De Luca, a fellow Democrat and popular Mayor of Salerno who had been one of the loudest critics of Bassolino from within his coalition, but it was not able to recover. Stefano Caldoro, a former minister and leader of the New PSI, merged into The People of Freedom in 2009, won by a convincing margin over De Luca thanks to a 20% swing in favour of the centre-right, which included the Union of the Centre led by Ciriaco De Mita, an influent former leader of Christian Democracy converted into the role of local party boss. After the election, De Mita's nephew, Giuseppe was appointed Vice President by Caldoro.

The People of Freedom was by far the largest party in the region with more than 30% of the vote.

== Results ==
28–29 May 2010 Campania regional election results
Candidates	Votes	%	Seats	Parties	Votes	%	Seats
Stefano Caldoro	1,586,490	54.25	1				
Stefano Caldoro	1,586,490	54.25	1	The People of Freedom	872,628	31.66	21
Stefano Caldoro	1,586,490	54.25	1	Union of the Centre	259,204	9.40	6
Stefano Caldoro	1,586,490	54.25	1	Together for Caldoro (NPSI–MpA–PRI–InM)	159,768	5.80	4
Stefano Caldoro	1,586,490	54.25	1	We the South	98,895	3.59	2
Stefano Caldoro	1,586,490	54.25	1	Union of Democrats for Europe	92,452	3.35	2
Stefano Caldoro	1,586,490	54.25	1	Alliance of the Centre–Christian Democracy	64,702	2.35	1
Stefano Caldoro	1,586,490	54.25	1	Alliance of People (Pensioners - others)	39,460	1.43	1
Stefano Caldoro	1,586,490	54.25	1	The Right	28,009	1.02	1
Stefano Caldoro	1,586,490	54.25	1	Total	1,615,118	58.60	38
Vincenzo De Luca	1,258,787	43.04	–				
Vincenzo De Luca	1,258,787	43.04	–	Democratic Party	590,592	21.43	14
Vincenzo De Luca	1,258,787	43.04	–	Italy of Values	178,283	6.47	4
Vincenzo De Luca	1,258,787	43.04	–	Left Ecology Freedom–PSE	97,076	3.52	2
Vincenzo De Luca	1,258,787	43.04	–	Alliance for Italy	83,906	3.04	–
Vincenzo De Luca	1,258,787	43.04	–	Free Campania	69,433	2.52	1
Vincenzo De Luca	1,258,787	43.04	–	Federation of the Greens–The Other South	29,509	1.07	–
Vincenzo De Luca	1,258,787	43.04	–	Bonino-Pannella List	12,349	0.45	–
Vincenzo De Luca	1,258,787	43.04	–	Total	1,061,148	38.50	21
Paolo Ferrero	39,730	1.36	–	Federation of the Left (incl. PRC, PdCI)	43,097	1.56	–
Roberto Fico	39,353	1.35	–	Five Star Movement	36,792	1.33	–
Total candidates	2,924,360	100.00	1	Total parties	2,756,155	100.00	59
Source: Ministry of the Interior
