= 2025 Campania regional election =

Italian regional election

- 23–24 November 2025

All 51 seats to the Regional Council of Campania
- Opinion polls
- Registered: 4,977,974
- Turnout: 44.10% (▼11.42pp)
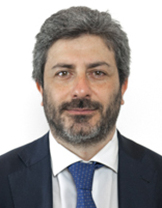

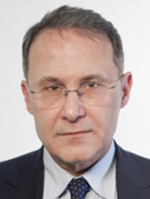
	Majority party	Minority party
Leader	Roberto Fico	Edmondo Cirielli
Party	M5S	FdI
Alliance	Centre-left	Centre-right
Seats won	33	18
Seat change	▼7 (Note: This is compared to the total of Vincenzo De Luca (Centre-left coalition) and Valeria Ciarambino (M5S) in 2020.)	▲7
Popular vote	1,286,188	757,836
Percentage	60.63%	35.72%
Swing	▼18.78pp	▲17.66pp
- Map of the election result
President before election
Vincenzo De Luca
PD
Elected President
Roberto Fico
M5S

The 2025 Campania regional election was held in Campania, Italy, from 23 to 24 November 2025.

== Electoral system ==
The Regional Council of Campania is composed of 51 members, elected in a party-list proportional representation system. Regional councillors are selected from party lists at the constituency level, with an electoral threshold at 2,5%. An additional seat is reserved to the President-elect, who is the candidate winning a plurality of votes. A majority bonus of 60% is granted to the winning coalition.

Seat distribution of the Regional Council of Campania
Provinces	Seats
Avellino	4
Benevento	2
Caserta	8
Naples	27
Salerno	9
President	1
Total	51

== Parties and candidates ==
The outgoing president Vincenzo De Luca was unable to run for a third term, so he struck an agreement with PD's national secretary Elly Schlein to have his son Piero elected as PD's regional secretary in Campania, in exchange agreeing to support Roberto Fico of the Five Star Movement as the centre-left coalition's presidential candidate. The candidates affiliated with De Luca then ran as part of the "Head Held High" (A Testa Alta) list in the centre-left coalition, including his vice-president Fulvio Bonavitacola.

=== Presidential candidate ===
Candidate	Experience	Alliance
Roberto Fico	President of the Chamber of Deputies (2018–2022); Chairman of the RAI Supervision Commission (2013–2018); Member of the Chamber of Deputies (2013–2022)	Centre-left coalition
Edmondo Cirielli	Deputy Minister of the Foreign Affairs (2022–present); President of the Province of Salerno (2009–2012); Member of the Chamber of Deputies (2001–present)	Centre-right coalition

=== Parties and coalitions ===
Political party or alliance	Constituent lists	Previous result		Candidate
Political party or alliance	Constituent lists	Votes (%)	Seats	Candidate
Centre-left coalition	Democratic Party	16.9	8	Roberto Fico
Centre-left coalition	Head Held High	13.3	6	Roberto Fico
Centre-left coalition	Five Star Movement	9.9	7	Roberto Fico
Centre-left coalition	Reformist House (incl. IV)	7.4	4	Roberto Fico
Centre-left coalition	Us of the Centre – We the South	4.4	2	Roberto Fico
Centre-left coalition	Forward Campania – PSI (incl. PRI)	2.6	1	Roberto Fico
Centre-left coalition	Greens and Left Alliance	—N/a	—N/a	Roberto Fico
Centre-left coalition	Fico for President (incl. PSDI, MET, Volt, AD)	—N/a	—N/a	Roberto Fico
Centre-right coalition	Brothers of Italy (incl. MIS)	6.0	4	Edmondo Cirielli
Centre-right coalition	League	5.7	3	Edmondo Cirielli
Centre-right coalition	Forza Italia	5.2	2	Edmondo Cirielli
Centre-right coalition	Union of the Centre – Christian Democracy	1.9	1	Edmondo Cirielli
Centre-right coalition	Us Moderates	—N/a	—N/a	Edmondo Cirielli
Centre-right coalition	Christian Democracy with Rotondi	—N/a	—N/a	Edmondo Cirielli
Centre-right coalition	Pensioners and Consumers	—N/a	—N/a	Edmondo Cirielli
Centre-right coalition	Cirielli for President – Moderates and Reformists (incl. NPSI)	—N/a	—N/a	Edmondo Cirielli
Popular Campania (incl. PaP, PRC and PCI)		2.2	–	Giuliano Granato
Bandecchi Dimension (incl. AP)		—N/a	—N/a	Stefano Bandecchi
For the People and the Community (incl. Together)		—N/a	—N/a	Nicola Campanile
Force of the People		—N/a	—N/a	Carlo Arnese

== Opinion polls ==
=== Presidential candidates ===
Publication date	Institute	Client	Sample	Margin of error	Fico	Cirielli	Granato	Campanile	Bandecchi	Arnese	Lead
5 November 2025	Noto	Porta a Porta	-	-	52	45	3				7
6 November 2025	SWG	Sinistra Italiana	1000	±3.1	55–59	38–42	2–4				17
6 November 2025	Tecnè	Agenzia Dire	1000	±3.1	49–53	42.5–46.5	2.5–6.5				6.5
7 November 2025	Ipsos	Corriere della Sera	800	±3.5	53	42.5	1.8	1.5	0.5	0.7	10.5

=== Electoral lists ===
Publication date	Institute	Client	Sample	Margin of error	PD	M5S	AVS	CR	RFP	ATA	NdC	PSI	FdI	FI	Lega	NM	UDC–DC	DCR	CP-MR	PC	CP	PER	DB	FdP	Lead
6 November 2025	Tecnè	Agenzia Dire	1000	±3.1	17–21	12–16	5–9	9–13					18–22	10–14	2.5–6.5	6–10					2.5–6.5				1
7 November 2025	Ipsos	Corriere della Sera	800	±3.5	19.5	10.1	3.6	5.5	4	6.5	2.9	2.3	15	12.6	4.1	2.8	1.9	0.9	3	1.1	4.2				4.5

== Outcome ==
=== Result ===
23–24 November 2025 Campania regional election results
Candidates	Votes	%	Seats	Parties	Votes	%	Seats
Roberto Fico	1,286,188	60.63	1				
Roberto Fico	1,286,188	60.63	1	Democratic Party	370,016	18.41	10
Roberto Fico	1,286,188	60.63	1	Five Star Movement	183,333	9.12	5
Roberto Fico	1,286,188	60.63	1	Head Held High	167,569	8.34	4
Roberto Fico	1,286,188	60.63	1	Forward Campania	118,435	5.89	3
Roberto Fico	1,286,188	60.63	1	Reformist House	116,963	5.82	3
Roberto Fico	1,286,188	60.63	1	Fico for President	108,750	5.41	3
Roberto Fico	1,286,188	60.63	1	Greens and Left Alliance	93,596	4.66	2
Roberto Fico	1,286,188	60.63	1	Us of the Centre – We the South	71,260	3.55	2
Roberto Fico	1,286,188	60.63	1	Total	1,229,922	61.20	32
Edmondo Cirielli	757,836	35.72	1				
Edmondo Cirielli	757,836	35.72	1	Brothers of Italy	239,733	11.93	6
Edmondo Cirielli	757,836	35.72	1	Forza Italia	215,419	10.72	6
Edmondo Cirielli	757,836	35.72	1	League	110,735	5.51	3
Edmondo Cirielli	757,836	35.72	1	Cirielli for President – Moderates and Reformists	94,374	4.70	2
Edmondo Cirielli	757,836	35.72	1	Us Moderates	25,559	1.27	0
Edmondo Cirielli	757,836	35.72	1	Union of the Centre – Christian Democracy	9,771	0.49	0
Edmondo Cirielli	757,836	35.72	1	Christian Democracy with Rotondi	8,677	0.43	0
Edmondo Cirielli	757,836	35.72	1	Pensioners and Consumers	3,922	0.20	0
Edmondo Cirielli	757,836	35.72	1	Total	708,190	35.20	17
Giuliano Granato	43,055	2.03	0	Popular Campania	40,743	2.03	0
Nicola Campanile	20,235	0.95	0	For the People and the Community	19,843	0.99	0
Stefano Bandecchi	10,497	0.49	0	Bandecchi Dimension	8,522	0.42	0
Carlo Arnese	3,663	0.17	0	Force of the People	2,493	0.12	0
Blank and invalid votes	72,366	3.30					
Total candidates	2,121,474	100.0	2	Total parties	2,009,713	100.0	49
Registered voters/turnout	2,193,840	44.10					
Source: Campania Region – Results

Popular vote by party
PD	18.41%
FdI	11.93%
FI	10.72%
M5S	9.12%
ATA	8.34%
AC	5.89%
CR	5.82%
Lega	5.51%
Fico	5.41%
Cirielli	4.70%
AVS	4.66%
NdC	3.55%
CP	2.03%
NM	1.27%
Others	2.64%

Popular vote by president
Fico	60.63%
Cirielli	35.72%
Granato	2.03%
Others	1.62%

=== Turnout ===
Voter turnout
Constituency	Sunday, November 23			Monday, November 24	Previous Election	
Constituency	12:00 PM	19:00 PM	23:00 PM	15:00 PM	Previous Election	
Avellino	7.04%	24.26%	29.89%	41.27%	51.85%	▼10.57%
Benevento	7.33%	23.60%	28.93%	41.18%	51.69%	▼10.51%
Caserta	8.25%	27.59%	34.07%	46.99%	57.73%	▼10.54%
Naples	8.58%	25.94%	32.22%	43.73%	55.32%	▼11.59%
Salerno	8.20%	25.60%	31.85%	44.60%	57.10%	▼12.50%
(Campania) Total	8.25%	25.86%	32.06%	44.10%	55.52%	▼11.42%

=== Analysis ===
Fico received nearly two thirds of the vote in the Metropolitan City of Naples, which contains more than half of the region's population. The centre right coalition improved its result compared to the 2020 election, when parties on the left received almost eighty percent of the vote, but the centre left coalition still retained a three fifths majority.

Cirielli performed best in the northern part of Campania, reducing the margin in Caserta, where he trailed by ten point five percentage points, and in Benevento, where he trailed by eight points. Among the region's twenty five municipalities with more than forty thousand inhabitants, Fico won in all except one. Cirielli obtained a plurality only in Cava de' Tirreni.

Fico V Cirielli by provinces
Province	Roberto Fico	Edmondo Cirielli	Others
Caserta	191,081 54.14%	153,546 43.51%	8,288 2.35%
Benevento	55,158 52.44%	46,848 44.54%	3,174 3.02%
Avellino	106,486 62.38%	58,945 34.53%	5,265 3.09%
Naples	692,204 65.06%	324,809 30.53%	46,934 4.41%
Salerno	241,259 56.27%	173,688 40.51%	13,789 3.22%

Fico V Cirielli by major cities
City	Roberto Fico	Edmondo Cirielli	Others
Naples	203,147 69.09%	73,236 24.91%	17,636 6.00%
Salerno	31,560 59.61%	18,233 34.44%	3,150 5.95%
Giugliano in Campania	23,175 62.27%	12,728 34.20%	1,311 3.53%
Torre del Greco	16,394 61.59%	8,373 31.46%	681 6.95%
Pozzuoli	19,312 72.54%	6,258 23.51%	1,051 3.95%
Casoria	18,301 75.22%	5,139 21.12%	889 3.66%
Caserta	17,051 58.10%	11,143 37.97%	1,155 3.93%
Castellammare di Stabia	13,636 60.70%	8,083 35.98%	745 3.32%
Afragola	12,365 57.49%	8,644 40.19%	500 2.32%
Acerra	17,833 73.75%	5,674 23.47%	673 2.78%
Marano di Napoli	11,735 61.19%	6,332 33.02%	1,112 5.79%
Benevento	13,508 64.30%	6,740 32.08%	759 3.62%
Avellino	13,315 58.45%	8,346 36.64%	1,118 4.91%
Portici	17,472 80.42%	3,377 15.54%	876 4.04%
Cava de' Tirreni	9,832 46.10%	10,598 49.70%	896 4.20%
Battipaglia	9,429 54.67%	6,946 40.27%	872 5.06%
Ercolano	14,890 77.87%	3,716 19.43%	515 2.70%
Aversa	10,412 57.34%	7,207 39.69%	538 2.97%
Scafati	8,443 48.37%	8,399 48.12%	613 3.51%
Casalnuovo di Napoli	9,951 52.22%	8,418 44.18%	686 3.60%
Nocera Inferiore	10,819 58.19%	7,188 38.66%	587 3.15%
San Giorgio a Cremano	14,617 80.94%	2,611 14.46%	832 4.60%
Quarto	11,186 73.77%	3,543 23.37%	434 2.86%
Pomigliano d'Arco	10,421 61.76%	5,227 30.98%	1,225 7.26%
Torre Annunziata	9,186 67.83%	3,579 26.43%	778 5.74%

=== Elected councilors ===
Party / List	Councilor elected	Preference votes	Constituency

== See also ==
- 2025 Italian local elections
