= 2020 Campania regional election =

- 20–21 September 2020

All 51 seats to the Regional Council of Campania
- Turnout: 55.54% (▲3.61%)
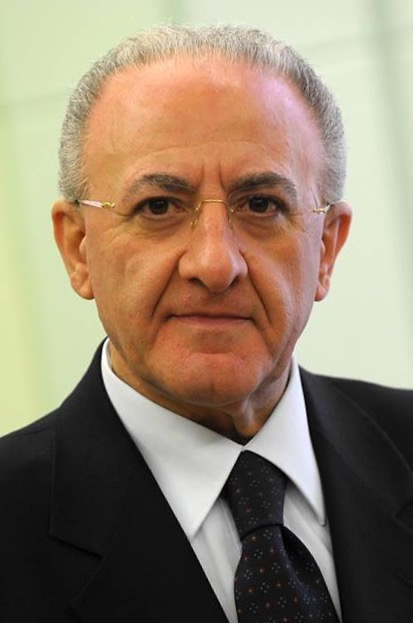

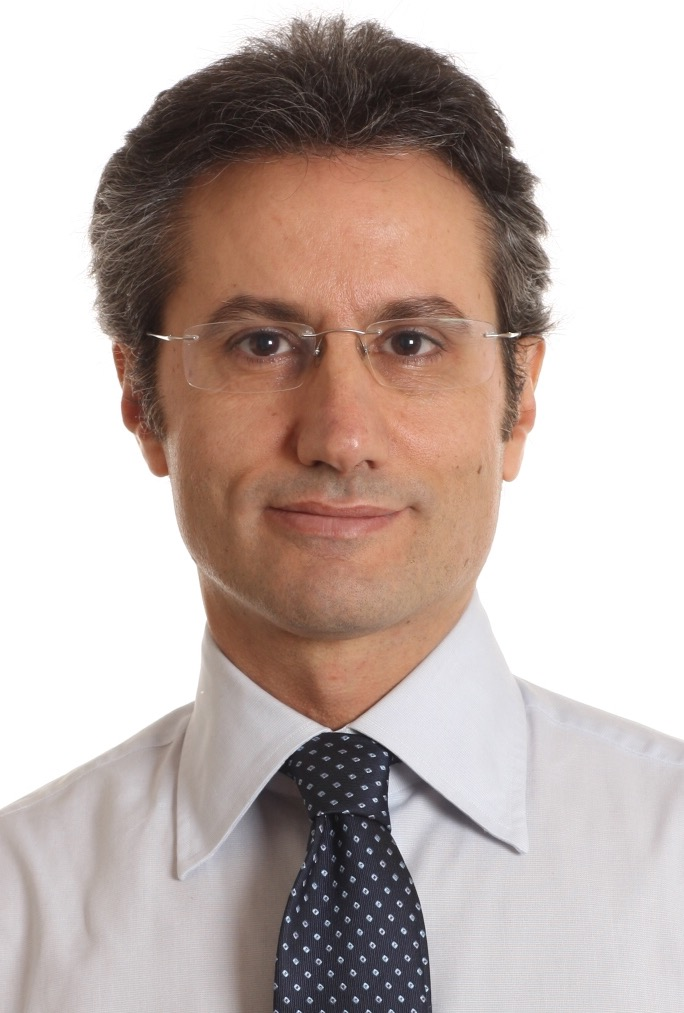

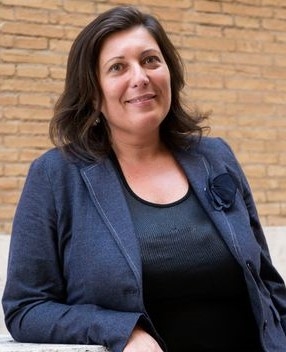
	Majority party	Minority party	Third party
Leader	Vincenzo De Luca	Stefano Caldoro	Valeria Ciarambino
Party	Democratic Party	Forza Italia	Five Star Movement
Alliance	Centre-left	Centre-right
Seats won	33	11	7
Seat change	▲2	▼2	0
Popular vote	1,789,017	464,921	255,714
Percentage	69.48%	18.06%	9.93%
Swing	▲28.33%	▼20.31%	▼7.60%
President before election
Vincenzo De Luca
Democratic Party
President
Vincenzo De Luca
Democratic Party

The 2020 Campanian regional election took place in Campania on 20 and 21 September 2020. It was originally scheduled to take place on 31 May 2020, but it was delayed due to the COVID-19 pandemic in Italy.

== Electoral system ==
The Regional Council of Campania (Consiglio Regionale della Campania) is composed of 50 members, elected in a party-list proportional representation system. The seats are divided among five constituencies corresponding to the region's provinces: Avellino with 4 seats, Benevento with 2 seats, Caserta with 8 seats, Naples with 27 seats, and Salerno with 9 seats. Regional councillors are selected from party lists at the constituency level, with an electoral threshold at 3%. An additional seat is reserved to the President-elect, who is the candidate winning a plurality of votes. A majority bonus of 60% is granted to the winning coalition.

== Background ==
In February 2020, the direction of the Democratic Party (PD) officially confirmed that the centre-left candidate for President of Campania would be the incumbent President Vincenzo De Luca.

The centre-right coalition picked former President Stefano Caldoro, a member of Forza Italia (FI), as its candidate, after hypotheses of a League's candidate or Mara Carfagna (FI) were abandoned.

The Five Star Movement (M5S) discarded the idea of a coalition with the centre-left, and proposed its own candidate Valeria Ciarambino. Previously, the M5S had proposed the incumbent Minister of Environment Sergio Costa as its candidate.

== Parties and candidates ==
Political party or alliance	Constituent lists	Previous result		Candidate
Political party or alliance	Constituent lists	Votes (%)	Seats	Candidate
Centre-left coalition	Democratic Party	19.5	15	Vincenzo De Luca
Centre-left coalition	De Luca for President	4.9	4	Vincenzo De Luca
Centre-left coalition	Free Campania	4.8	3	Vincenzo De Luca
Centre-left coalition	Democratic Centre	2.8	2	Vincenzo De Luca
Centre-left coalition	Italian Socialist Party	2.2	1	Vincenzo De Luca
Centre-left coalition	Green Europe – Solidary Democracy	1.2	1	Vincenzo De Luca
Centre-left coalition	Really – Animalist Party (incl. IiC)	—N/a	—N/a	Vincenzo De Luca
Centre-left coalition	More Campania in Europe (incl. PLI)	—N/a	—N/a	Vincenzo De Luca
Centre-left coalition	Us Campanians	—N/a	—N/a	Vincenzo De Luca
Centre-left coalition	Democratic Making – Populars	—N/a	—N/a	Vincenzo De Luca
Centre-left coalition	Liberal Democrats – Popular Campania – Moderates	—N/a	—N/a	Vincenzo De Luca
Centre-left coalition	Democrats and Progressives (incl. Art.1, RD)	—N/a	—N/a	Vincenzo De Luca
Centre-left coalition	Italia Viva	—N/a	—N/a	Vincenzo De Luca
Centre-left coalition	For People and the Community	—N/a	—N/a	Vincenzo De Luca
Centre-left coalition	Italian Republican Party – League for Italy	—N/a	—N/a	Vincenzo De Luca
Centre-right coalition	Forza Italia	17.8	7	Stefano Caldoro
Centre-right coalition	Caldoro for President – Union of the Centre (incl. NPSI, C!)	9.6 (Note: 7.2 % of the vote to the "Caldoro for President" list, 2.4 % of the vote to UDC.)	4 (Note: 2 seats to the "Caldoro for President" list, 2 seats to UDC.)	Stefano Caldoro
Centre-right coalition	Brothers of Italy	5.5	2	Stefano Caldoro
Centre-right coalition	League	—N/a	—N/a	Stefano Caldoro
Centre-right coalition	Alliance of the Centre	—N/a	—N/a	Stefano Caldoro
Centre-right coalition	Southern Identity – Southern Macroregion	—N/a	—N/a	Stefano Caldoro
Five Star Movement		17.0	7	Valeria Ciarambino
Terra (incl. SI, PRC, PCI, PdS, èViva)		2.3	–	Luca Saltalamacchia
Power to the People		—N/a	—N/a	Giuliano Granato
Third Pole		—N/a	—N/a	Sergio Angrisano
Party of Good Manners		—N/a	—N/a	Giuseppe Cirillo

== Opinion polls ==
=== Candidates ===
View source data.

Date	Polling firm/ Client	Sample size	De Luca	Caldoro	Ciarambino	Others	Undecided	Lead
21 Sep 2020	Opinio (exit poll)	–	54.0–58.0	23.0–27.0	10.5–14.5	–	–	31.0
1–4 Sep 2020	Ixè	1,000	54.4	26.9	15.0	3.7	23.7	27.5
29 Aug 2020	Ipsos	930	50.4	29.0	15.9	4.8	8.4	21.4
28 Aug–1 Sep 2020	SWG	1,000	51–55	29–33	11–15	—N/a	26	18–26
27 Aug 2020	Tecnè	2,000	45–49	33–37	14–18	2–4	—N/a	8–14
24 Aug–2 Sep 2020	Noto	—N/a	46–50	34–38	11–15	1–5	—N/a	8–14
3–4 Aug 2020	Tecnè	1,000	44.5	39.0	15.0	1.5	—N/a	5.5
20–22 Jul 2020	Winpoll	1,002	58.6	28.9	9.9	2.6	21.0	29.7
25–26 Jun 2020	Winpoll Arcadia	800	65.4	21.9	10.9	—N/a	—N/a	43.5
24–25 Jun 2020	Noto	1,000	45.0	39.0	13.0	3.0	—N/a	6.0
17–20 Dec 2019	Winpoll Arcadia	700	39.5	36.7	23.8	–	—N/a	2.8

==== Hypothetical candidates ====
Date	Polling firm/ Client	Sample size	De Luca	Caldoro	Other CDX	Ciarambino	Costa	Others	Undecided	Lead
20 Dec–25 Dec 2019	Index	1,000	36.0	47.0	—N/a	15.0	—N/a	2.0	27.2	11.0
20 Dec–25 Dec 2019	Index	1,000	35.0	—N/a	49.0 (Note: Mara Carfagna)	14.0	—N/a	2.0	25.9	14.0
12–15 Nov 2019	Noto (Note: This poll was commissioned by a political party.)	1,000	34.0	42.0	—N/a	—N/a	20.0	4.0	30.0	8.0
12–15 Nov 2019	Noto	1,000	32.0	—N/a	44.0	—N/a	22.0	2.0	25.8	12.0
12–15 Nov 2019	Noto	1,000	34.0	—N/a	42.0 (Note: Clemente Mastella)	—N/a	20.0	2.0	26.8	8.0
27 Sep 2019	Winpoll Arcadia	–	37.0	—N/a	20.4 (Note: Carfagna 16.9% and Edmondo Cirielli 4.5%.)	5.2	7.9	33.0 (Note: De Magistris, 28.5%)	—N/a	8.5

=== Parties ===
Date	Polling firm	Sample size	Centre-left							M5S	Centre-right				Others	Undecided	Lead
Date	Polling firm	Sample size	PD	IV	EV	DeP	+E	DL	Other	M5S	FI	Lega	FdI	Other	Others	Undecided	Lead
1–4 Sep 2020	Ixè	1,000	20.6	1.5	—N/a	—N/a	—N/a	17.3	7.1	19.4	8.8	8.6	7.8	6.2	2.7	26.3	1.2
29 Aug 2020	Ipsos	930	19.2	12.0				12.2	4.1	17.2	14.0	3.3	10.2	1.0	2.7	14.5	2.0
28 Aug–1 Sep 2020	SWG	1,000	18.5–20.5	1.5–2.5	1.0–2.0	1.0–2.0	1.0–2.0	17.0–19.0	—N/a	13.0–15.0	5.5–7.5	9.5–11.5	7.5–9.5	—N/a	1.0–2.0	29.0	-0.5–3.5
20–22 Jul 2020	Winpoll	1,002	15.0	1.9	0.9	0.8	1.3	17.2	7.7	17.0	6.0	14.4	14.9	0.7	1.4	—N/a	0.2
25–26 Jun 2020	Winpoll Arcadia	800	21.3	0.9	1.2	1.1	—N/a	—N/a	20.6	21.7	8.2	10.7	10.5	2.7	1.1	—N/a	0.4
29–30 May 2020	Tecnè	1,000	21.7	2.4	0.9	2.7	2.3	—N/a	1.7	24.3	14.1	15.3	12.4	—N/a	2.2	—N/a	2.6
17–20 Dec 2019	Winpoll Arcadia	700	22.7	2.5	2.1	2.6	2.4	—N/a	1.2	26.2	9.7	18.8	8.8	—N/a	3.0	—N/a	3.5
30 Nov–2 Dec 2019	Index	1,000	16.0	3.0	2.0	—N/a	—N/a	5.0	8.0	15.0	14.0	17.0	11.0	4.0	5.0	17.2	1.0
12–15 Nov 2019	Noto (Note: This poll was commissioned by a political party.)	1,000	22.0	3.0	2.0	2.0	—N/a	—N/a	3.0	18.0	16.0	13.0	10.0	3.0	8.0	28.0	4.0

== Results ==
The election saw the victory of the centre-left candidate and incumbent President of Campania, Vincenzo De Luca, who won almost 69.5% of the vote with more than 45% lead over the centre-right candidate Stefano Caldoro. The Five Star Movement candidate, Valeria Ciarambino, arrived third with less than 10% of the vote. The Democratic Party was the first party by number of votes, with 16.9% of preferences, followed by the list of De Luca and by the Five Star Movement.

20–21 September 2020 Campanian regional election results
Candidates	Votes	%	Seats	Parties	Votes	%	Seats
Vincenzo De Luca	1,789,017	69.48	1	Democratic Party	398,490	16.90	8
Vincenzo De Luca	1,789,017	69.48	1	De Luca for President	313,666	13.30	6
Vincenzo De Luca	1,789,017	69.48	1	Italia Viva	173,870	7.37	4
Vincenzo De Luca	1,789,017	69.48	1	Free Campania	122,367	5.19	2
Vincenzo De Luca	1,789,017	69.48	1	Democratic Making – Populars	104,857	4.45	2
Vincenzo De Luca	1,789,017	69.48	1	Us Campanians	102,652	4.35	2
Vincenzo De Luca	1,789,017	69.48	1	Liberal Democrats – Popular Campania – Moderates	84,769	3.60	2
Vincenzo De Luca	1,789,017	69.48	1	Democratic Centre	76,141	3.23	2
Vincenzo De Luca	1,789,017	69.48	1	Italian Socialist Party	60,100	2.55	1
Vincenzo De Luca	1,789,017	69.48	1	More Campania in Europe	45,500	1.93	1
Vincenzo De Luca	1,789,017	69.48	1	Green Europe – Solidary Democracy	42,996	1.82	1
Vincenzo De Luca	1,789,017	69.48	1	Really – Animalist Party	33,681	1.43	1
Vincenzo De Luca	1,789,017	69.48	1	For the People and the Community	26,452	1.12	–
Vincenzo De Luca	1,789,017	69.48	1	Democrats and Progressives	25,254	1.07	–
Vincenzo De Luca	1,789,017	69.48	1	Italian Republican Party	5,745	0.24	–
Vincenzo De Luca	1,789,017	69.48	1	Total	1,616,540	68.57	32
Stefano Caldoro	464,921	18.06	1	Brothers of Italy	140,918	5.98	4
Stefano Caldoro	464,921	18.06	1	League	133,152	5.65	3
Stefano Caldoro	464,921	18.06	1	Forza Italia	121,695	5.16	2
Stefano Caldoro	464,921	18.06	1	Caldoro for President – Union of the Centre	45,326	1.92	1
Stefano Caldoro	464,921	18.06	1	Alliance of the Centre	6,432	0.27	–
Stefano Caldoro	464,921	18.06	1	Southern Identity – South Macroregion	3,333	0.14	–
Stefano Caldoro	464,921	18.06	1	Total	450,856	19.12	10
Valeria Ciarambino	255,714	9.93	–	Five Star Movement	233,974	9.92	7
Giuliano Granato	30,955	1.20	–	Power to the People	26,711	1.13	–
Luca Saltalamacchia	27,475	1.07	–	Terra	25,125	1.07	–
Sergio Angrisano	4,028	0.16	–	Third Pole	3,056	0.13	–
Giuseppe Cirillo	2,608	0.10	–	Party of Good Manners	1,348	0.06	–
Blank and invalid votes	199,386	7.19					
Total candidates	2,574,718	100.00	2	Total parties	2,357,610	100.00	49
Registered voters/turnout	4,996,921	55.52					
Source: Ministry of the Interior – Results

Popular vote
PD	16.90%
De Luca	13.30%
M5S	9.92%
IV	7.37%
FdI	5.98%
Lega	5.65%
CL	5.19%
FI	5.16%
FD–Pop.	4.45%
NC	4.35%
LD–Mod	3.60%
CD	3.23%
PSI	2.55%
+E	1.93%
UDC	1.92%
EV–DemoS	1.82%
PA	1.43%
Others	5.25%

President
De Luca	69.48%
Caldoro	18.06%
Ciarambino	9.93%
Others	2.53%

Seats summary
Centre-left	64.70%
Centre-right	21.57%
M5S	13.73%

=== Turnout ===
Region	Time			
Region	20 Sep			21 Sep
Region	12:00	19:00	23:00	15:00
Campania	11.32%	26.52%	38.92%	55.53%
Province	Time			
Province	20 Sep			21 Sep
Province	12:00	19:00	23:00	15:00
Avellino	9.55%	24.95%	37.01%	51.86%
Benevento	10.06%	24.80%	36.22%	51.73%
Caserta	11.21%	27.00%	40.20%	57.61%
Naples	11.84%	26.78%	38.86%	55.33%
Salerno	11.24%	26.67%	39.62%	57.11%
Source: Ministry of the Interior – Turnout

=== Elected councillors ===
Constituency	Party	Member
Campania (at-large)	PD	Vincenzo De Luca (Note: As elected President of the Region.)
Campania (at-large)	FI	Stefano Caldoro (Note: As runner-up candidate to President of the Region.)
Naples	PD	Mario Casillo
Naples	PD	Loredana Raia
Naples	PD	Carmela Fiola
Naples	PD	Massimiliano Manfredi
Naples	DLP	Vittoria Lettieri
Naples	DLP	Lucia Fortini
Naples	DLP	Carmine Mocerino
Naples	DLP	Paola Raia
Naples	M5S	Valeria Ciarambino
Naples	M5S	Gennaro Saiello
Naples	M5S	Maria Muscarà
Naples	M5S	Luigi Cirillo
Naples	FdI	Michele Schiano di Visconti
Naples	FdI	Marco Nonno
Naples	LD–Mod	Giuseppe Sommese
Naples	LD–Mod	Pasquale Di Fenza
Naples	CD	Giovanni Mensorio
Naples	CD	Raffaele Maria Pisacane
Naples	IV	Francesco Iovino
Naples	Lega	Severino Nappi
Naples	CL	Giovanni Porcelli
Naples	FI	Anna Rita Patriarca
Naples	FD–Pop	Felice Di Maiolo
Naples	+E	Fulvio Frezza
Naples	EV–DemoS	Francesco Emilio Borrelli
Naples	UDC	Gennaro Cinque

Constituency	Party	Member
Salerno	PD	Francesco Picarone
Salerno	DLP	Luca Cascone
Salerno	M5S	Michele Cammarano
Salerno	IV	Tommaso Pellegrino
Salerno	FdI	Nunzio Carpentieri
Salerno	Lega	Attilio Pierro
Salerno	CL	Giovanni Savastano
Salerno	FD–Pop	Corrado Matera
Salerno	PSI	Andrea Volpe
Caserta	PD	Gennaro Oliviero
Caserta	DLP	Giovanni Zannini
Caserta	M5S	Salvatore Aversano
Caserta	IV	Vincenzo Santangelo
Caserta	FdI	Alfonso Piscitelli
Caserta	Lega	Gianpiero Zinzi
Caserta	FI	Massimo Grimaldi
Caserta	NC	Luigia Maria Iodice
Avellino	PD	Maurizio Petracca
Avellino	M5S	Vincenzo Ciampi
Avellino	IV	Vincenzo Alaia
Avellino	D–PA	Livio Petitto
Benevento	PD	Erasmo Mortaruolo
Benevento	NC	Luigi Abbate

== See also ==
- 2020 Italian regional elections
