= 2000 Campania regional election =

- 16 April 2000

All 47 seats to the Regional Council
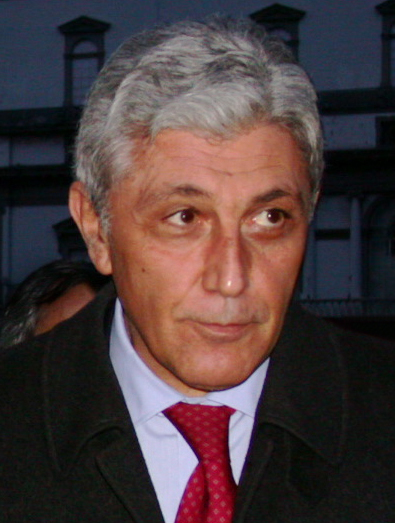

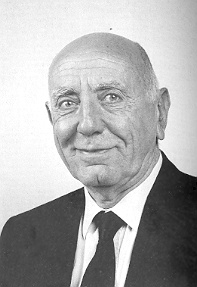
	Majority party	Minority party
Leader	Antonio Bassolino	Antonio Rastrelli
Party	DS	National Alliance
Alliance	The Olive Tree	Pole for Freedoms
Seats won	26	21
Seat change	▲6	▼3
Popular vote	1,654,777	1,350,621
Percentage	54.18%	44.22%
Swing	▲6.82%	▼3.64%
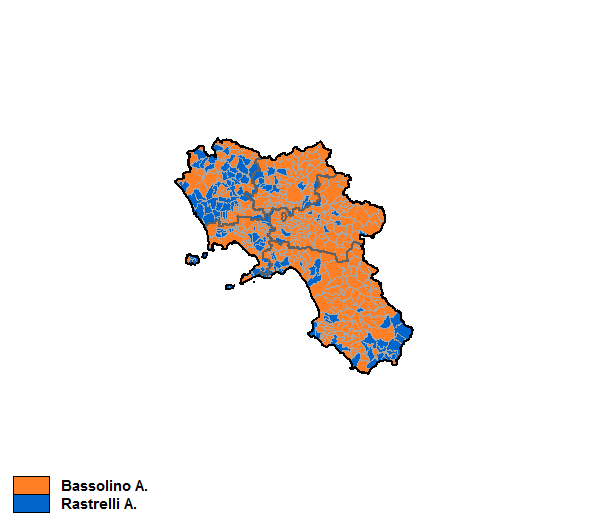
President before election
Andrea Losco
Italian People's Party
Subsequent President
Antonio Bassolino
Democrats of the Left

The Campania regional election of 2000 took place on 16 April 2000.

Antonio Bassolino (Democrats of the Left) was elected President, defeating Antonio Rastrelli (National Alliance), who had been replaced in 1999 by a centre-left ribaltone led by Andrea Losco (People's Party).

== Results ==
16 April 2000 Campania regional election results
Candidates	Votes	%	Seats	Parties	Votes	%	Seats
Antonio Bassolino	1,654,777	54.18	12				
Antonio Bassolino	1,654,777	54.18	12	Democrats of the Left	407,032	14.19	7
Antonio Bassolino	1,654,777	54.18	12	Italian People's Party	301,927	10.53	5
Antonio Bassolino	1,654,777	54.18	12	Union of Democrats for Europe	201,593	7.03	3
Antonio Bassolino	1,654,777	54.18	12	The Democrats	152,287	5.31	3
Antonio Bassolino	1,654,777	54.18	12	Italian Democratic Socialists	127,173	4.43	2
Antonio Bassolino	1,654,777	54.18	12	Communist Refoundation Party	108,498	3.78	2
Antonio Bassolino	1,654,777	54.18	12	Italian Renewal	82,203	2.87	1
Antonio Bassolino	1,654,777	54.18	12	Federation of the Greens	80,208	2.80	1
Antonio Bassolino	1,654,777	54.18	12	Party of Italian Communists	45,827	1.60	1
Antonio Bassolino	1,654,777	54.18	12	Italian Republican Party	31,145	1.09	1
Antonio Bassolino	1,654,777	54.18	12	Total	1,537,893	53.64	23
Antonio Rastrelli	1,350,621	44.22	1				
Antonio Rastrelli	1,350,621	44.22	1	Forza Italia	600,180	20.93	10
Antonio Rastrelli	1,350,621	44.22	1	National Alliance	319,338	11.14	5
Antonio Rastrelli	1,350,621	44.22	1	Christian Democratic Centre	160,066	5.58	3
Antonio Rastrelli	1,350,621	44.22	1	Christian Democratic Party	95,205	3.32	2
Antonio Rastrelli	1,350,621	44.22	1	United Christian Democrats	82,929	2.89	1
Antonio Rastrelli	1,350,621	44.22	1	Tricolour Flame	19,489	0.68	–
Antonio Rastrelli	1,350,621	44.22	1	Socialist Party	18,034	0.63	–
Antonio Rastrelli	1,350,621	44.22	1	Southern League Ausonia	2,219	0.08	–
Antonio Rastrelli	1,350,621	44.22	1	Total	1,297,460	45.24	21
Marco Pannella	39,325	1.29	–	Bonino List	27,151	0.95	–
Vittorio Granillo	9,331	0.31	–	Cobas for Self-Organization	5,188	0.18	–
Total candidates	3,054,054	100.00	13	Total parties	2,867,692	100.00	47
Source: Ministry of the Interior
