= Massimiliano Manfredi =

Italian politician (born 1973)

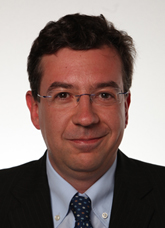
- Manfredi in 2013

President of the Regional Council of Campania
- Incumbent
- Assumed office 29 December 2025
- Preceded by: Gennaro Oliviero

Personal details
- Born: 17 June 1973 (age 52)
- Party: Democratic Party (since 2007)
- Relatives: Gaetano Manfredi (brother)

Massimiliano Manfredi (born 17 June 1973) is an Italian politician serving as president of the Regional Council of Campania since 2025. From 2013 to 2018, he was a member of the Chamber of Deputies.
