= Gianpiero Zinzi =

Italian politician (born 1983)

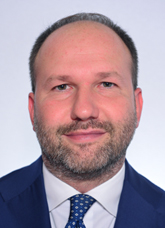
- Zinzi in 2022

Member of the Chamber of Deputies
- Incumbent
- Assumed office 13 October 2022
- Constituency: Campania 2 – 01

Personal details
- Born: 15 January 1983 (age 43)
- Party: Lega (since 2020)
- Parent: Domenico Zinzi (father)

Gianpiero Zinzi (born 15 January 1983) is an Italian politician serving as a member of the Chamber of Deputies since 2022. He is the son of Domenico Zinzi.
