= Antonio Rastrelli (politician) =

Italian politician and lawyer (1927–2019)

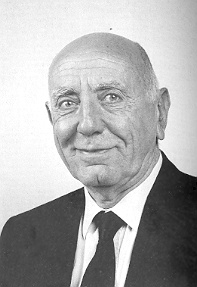

President of Campania
- In office 8 June 1995 – 23 March 1999
- Preceded by: Giovanni Grasso
- Succeeded by: Andrea Losco

Member of the Chamber of Deputies
- In office 15 April 1994 – 14 June 1995
- Constituency: Naples–Vomero

Member of the Senate
- In office 20 June 1979 – 14 April 1994
- Constituency: Naples

Personal details
- Born: 15 October 1927 Portici, Italy
- Died: 15 August 2019 (aged 91) Naples, Italy
- Party: MSI (1948–1995); AN (1995–2007); The Right (2007–2017)
- Children: 5, including Sergio
- Education: University of Naples Federico II
- Profession: Politician, Supreme Court lawyer

Antonio Rastrelli (15 October 1927 – 15 August 2019) was an Italian politician and lawyer. He served as the President of Campania from 1995 until 1999.

== Early life and family ==
Antonio Rastrelli was born in Portici (Campania) in 1927. His father, Carlo Rastrelli, was among the founders of Neapolitan fascism along with Aurelio Padovani, General Consul of the Fascist Militia M.V.S.N., and Prefectural Commissioner of L'Aquila in the regime of the Italian Social Republic. After the war, Carlo Rastrelli served as Naples deputy mayor under Monarchist National Party's Achille Lauro.

Antonio's brother Massimo Rastrelli became a Jesuit priest and was an activist in the social struggle against usury.

The Rastrellis are direct descendants of the architect Francesco Bartolomeo Rastrelli who designed the Czars' Winter Palace in St. Petersburg.

== Politics ==
Antonio Rastrelli joined the Italian Social Movement in 1948. He was elected Senator for the first time in 1979 and held office until 1994. In the 1994 Italian general election, which marked a "general turn to the right," Rastrelli was elected to the Chamber of Deputies and was appointed Undersecretary to the Ministry of Treasury in the first Berlusconi cabinet.

In 1995, he was nominated president of Campania by the Polo delle Libertà party (Pole of Freedoms).

During his tenure, in 1998, Campania was hit by a mudslide that struck the hilly area east of Naples and left in its wake 37 people dead and 71 more missing. Environmentalists blamed decades of "bad land management" with people allowed to grub up trees and burn off scrub-land to increase pasture or clear areas for unregulated construction. Campania president Rastrelli, who was serving also as special commissioner for hydro-geological issues, defended his record, saying "having the power to intervene is one thing. But it's no good without funding."

In 1999, he resigned after the Polo withdrew its support and he was replaced by Andrea Losco, the centre-left coalition's nominee.

In the 2000 regional elections, he was again a candidate for president of Campania but he was defeated by Antonio Bassolino.

In 2007, he joined the far-right party La Destra ("The Right"), led by Francesco Storace.

== Administrative justice ==
In 2001, on the recommendation of the President of the Republic Carlo Azeglio Ciampi, Rastrelli was unanimously elected by the Italian Parliament to serve as lay member of the Consiglio di presidenza della giustizia amministrativa (the Presidency Council of Administrative Justice), a position he held until 2006.

== Death ==
He died on 15 August 2019. His funeral at the Sacro Cuore church in Naples attracted a large crowd, with many attendees giving the fascist salute.

== Honors ==

The Spanish government, in 1998, inducted Rastrelli in the Orden del Mérito Civil (Order of Civil Merit) in recognition of "extraordinary service for the benefit of Spain."
