= Nicola Mancino =

Italian politician (born 1931)

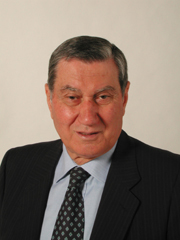
- Mancino in 2006

President of the Senate of the Republic
- In office 9 May 1996 – 29 May 2001
- Preceded by: Carlo Scognamiglio Pasini
- Succeeded by: Marcello Pera

Acting President of Italy
- In office 15 May 1999 – 18 May 1999
- Prime Minister: Massimo D'Alema
- Preceded by: Oscar Luigi Scalfaro
- Succeeded by: Carlo Azeglio Ciampi

Minister of the Interior
- In office 28 June 1992 – 10 May 1994
- Prime Minister: Giuliano Amato; Carlo Azeglio Ciampi
- Preceded by: Vincenzo Scotti
- Succeeded by: Roberto Maroni

Vice-President of the High Council of the Judiciary
- In office 1 August 2006 – 2 August 2010
- President: Giorgio Napolitano
- Preceded by: Virginio Rognoni
- Succeeded by: Michele Vietti

Member of the Senate of the Republic
- In office 5 July 1976 – 24 July 2006
- Constituency: Campania

President of Campania
- In office 11 August 1975 – 8 May 1976
- Preceded by: Vittorio Cascetta
- Succeeded by: Gaspare Russo
- In office 21 April 1971 – 12 May 1972
- Preceded by: Carlo Leone
- Succeeded by: Alberto Servidio

Personal details
- Born: 15 October 1931 (age 95) Montefalcione, Italy
- Party: PD (since 2007)
- Other political affiliations: DC (1976–1994); PPI (1994–2002); DL (2002–2007)
- Education: University of Naples Federico II
- Profession: Lawyer

Nicola Mancino (born 15 October 1931) is an Italian politician who served as president of the Senate of the Republic from 1996 to 2001. He was also president of Campania's regional parliament from 1965 to 1971, president of Campania from 1971 to 1972, and Minister of the Interior from 1992 to 1994.

== Early life ==
Mancino was born in Montefalcione, province of Avellino, in the Campania region. He became first provincial and then regional secretary of Christian Democracy (DC), being elected for the first time in the Senate of the Republic in 1976. He had was reconfirmed in all subsequent elections until 2006.

== Minister of the Interior ==
Mancini was Minister of the Interior from 1992 to 1994. On 1 July 1992, magistrate Paolo Borsellino had a meeting with Mancino, who at the time had just been named as Minister; Borsellino would be killed just over two weeks later in the Via D'Amelio bombing on 19 July. Mancino always denied that he had met Borsellino. In a television interview of 24 July 2009, judge Giuseppe Ayala said that "Mancino himself told me that he had met Borsellino on 1 July 1992. More: Mancino showed me his meeting agenda with the name of Borsellino on it."

Ayala later refuted these words in an interview to magazine Sette. A personal agenda in possess of Borsellino's family, has an annotation by the judge saying: "1 July h 19:30 : Mancino". Vittorio Aliquò, the other magistrate who was interviewing Mutolo at the time of ministry's phone call, later declared that he had accompanied Borsellino "up to the threshold of the minister's office". In 2007, a letter from Borsellino's brother, Salvatore, was published. Titled "19 July 1992: A State Massacre" (19 luglio 1992: Una strage di stato), the letter supports the hypothesis that Mancino knew the causes of the magistrate's assassination. Borsellino's brother wrote:

I ask Mancino, of whom I remembered, of the years after 1992, a hardly pushed down drop in the commemorations of Paolo in Palermo, to squeeze his memory to tell us what they talked about in the meeting with Paolo in the days immediately before his death. Or to explain us why, after calling my brother to meet him when he was interrogating Gaspare Mutolo, just 48 hours before the massacre, he had him meet the Head of Police Parisi and Bruno Contrada, a meeting from which Paolo got out shattered, at the point that he was seen holding two cigarettes at the same time... In that meeting is surely the key to his death and the Massacre of Via D'Amelio.

A law enacted and signed by Mancino in 1993 during his tenure as Interior Minister permits the prosecution of those involved in racial, ethnic and religious discrimination and the incitement of hate crime. This law is commonly called the "Mancino law".

== Later career ==
In 1994, after the dissolution of the DC, Mancino adhered to the Italian People's Party (PPI), collaborating with its secretary, Mino Martinazzoli. In July of the same year, he opposed the alliance with the centre-right coalition led by Silvio Berlusconi, and also opposed the election of Rocco Buttiglione as PPI secretary. He later became a member of The Daisy (La Margherita), a coalition of parties born out of the left wing of the PPI. After the victory of the centre-left coalition led by Romano Prodi in the 1996 Italian general election, Mancino was elected president of the Senate of the Republic, and served from 9 May 1996 until 29 May 2001.

On 24 July 2006, Mancino left the Senate and became deputy-president of the High Council of the Judiciary (Consiglio Superiore della Magistratura) Italy's senior council of justice. In July 2012, prosecutors in Palermo ordered Mancino to stand trial for withholding evidence about the alleged State-Mafia Pact, which would have involved talks between the Italian state and the Sicilian Mafia during the latter's bombing campaign in 1992 that assassinated, among others, the judges Giovanni Falcone and Paolo Borsellino. On 20 April 2018, he was acquitted.

== Electoral history ==
Election	House	Constituency	Party	Votes	Result
1976	Senate of the Republic	Campania – Avellino	DC	42,756	Elected
1979	Senate of the Republic	Campania – Avellino	DC	45,706	Elected
1983	Senate of the Republic	Campania – Avellino	DC	47,303	Elected
1987	Senate of the Republic	Campania – Avellino	DC	53,987	Elected
1992	Senate of the Republic	Campania – Avellino	DC	53,439	Elected
1994	Senate of the Republic	Campania – Avellino	PPI	57,286	Elected
1996	Senate of the Republic	Campania – Avellino	PPI	69,432	Elected
2001	Senate of the Republic	Campania – Avellino	DL	70,765	Elected
2006	Senate of the Republic	Campania	DL	– (Note: Elected in a closed list proportional representation system.)	Elected

Political offices
Preceded by Vincenzo Scotti	Minister of the Interior; 1992–1994	Succeeded by Carlo Azeglio Ciampi; Acting
Preceded by Carlo Scognamiglio	President of the Senate of the Republic; 1996–2001	Succeeded by Marcello Pera
Preceded by Oscar Luigi Scalfaro	President of Italy; Acting; 1999	Succeeded by Carlo Azeglio Ciampi
Legal offices
Preceded by Virginio Rognoni	Vice-President of the High Council of the Judiciary; 2006–2010	Succeeded by Michele Vietti
