= 1975 Campania regional election =

The Campania regional election of 1975 took place on 15 June 1975.

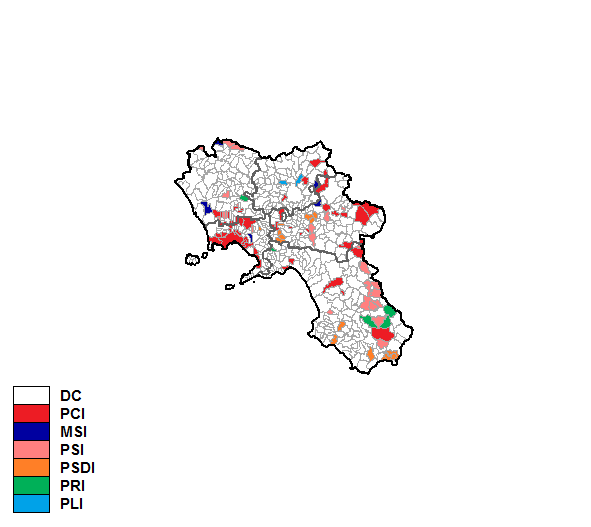
Largest party by municipality

== Events ==
Christian Democracy was the largest party, while the Italian Communist Party came second. After the election, Christian Democrat Nicola Mancino was elected president of the region, but in 1976 he was replaced by fellow Christian Democrat Gaspare Russo, to whom Ciro Cirillo succeeded in 1979.

== Results ==
Parties	Votes	Votes (%)	Seats
Christian Democracy	1,067,753	36.7	23
Italian Communist Party	788,997	27.1	16
Italian Social Movement	354,056	12.2	7
Italian Socialist Party	301,923	10.4	6
Italian Democratic Socialist Party	191,544	6.6	4
Italian Republican Party	105,701	3.6	2
Italian Liberal Party	60,545	2.1	1
Proletarian Democracy	32,697	1.1	1
Independent Left	7,880	0.3	-
Total	2,911,096	100.0	60

Source: Ministry of the Interior
