= 2005 Campania regional election =

- 3–4 April 2005

All 60 seats to the Regional Council
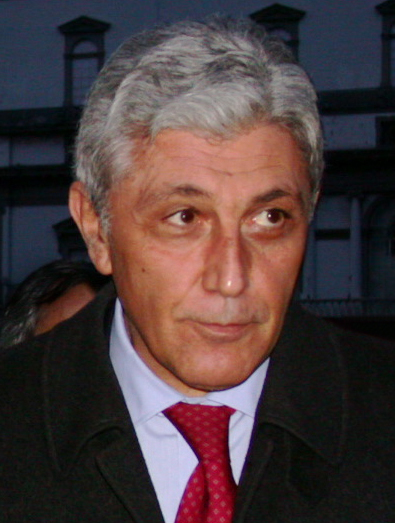

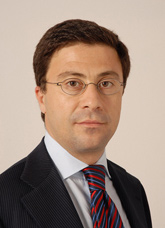
| | Majority party | Minority party |
|---|---|---|
| Leader | Antonio Bassolino | Italo Bocchino |
| Party | DS | National Alliance |
| Alliance | The Union | House of Freedoms |
| Seats won | 32 | 21 |
| Seat change | ▲6 | 0 |
| Popular vote | 1,891,895 | 1,056,445 |
| Percentage | 61.56% | 34.38% |
| Swing | ▲7.38% | ▼9.84% |
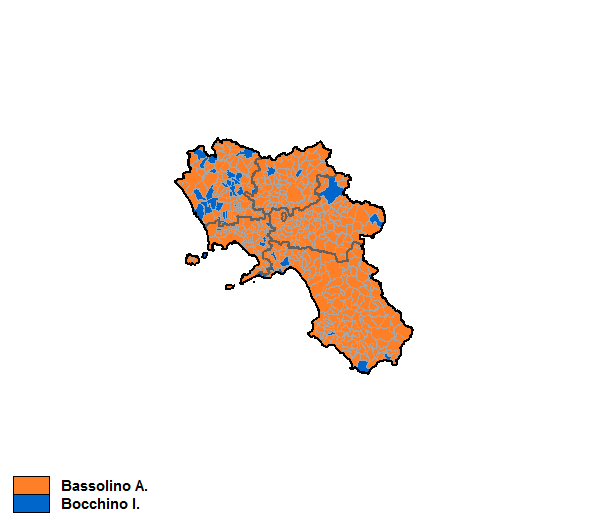
President before election
Antonio Bassolino
Democrats of the Left
Subsequent President
Antonio Bassolino
Democrats of the Left

The Campania regional election of 2005 took place on 3–4 April 2005.

Antonio Bassolino (Democrats of the Left, then Democratic Party) was re-elected defeating Italo Bocchino (National Alliance) by a landslide.

== Results ==
3–4 April 2005 Campania regional election results
| Candidates | Votes | % | Seats | Parties | Votes | % | Seats |
|---|---|---|---|---|---|---|---|
| Antonio Bassolino | 1,891,895 | 61.56 | 6 | | | | |
| Antonio Bassolino | 1,891,895 | 61.56 | 6 | Democracy is Freedom – The Daisy | 459,729 | 15.95 | 9 |
| Antonio Bassolino | 1,891,895 | 61.56 | 6 | Democrats of the Left | 438,196 | 15.20 | 8 |
| Antonio Bassolino | 1,891,895 | 61.56 | 6 | Union of Democrats for Europe | 292,382 | 10.14 | 5 |
| Antonio Bassolino | 1,891,895 | 61.56 | 6 | Italian Democratic Socialists | 154,341 | 5.35 | 3 |
| Antonio Bassolino | 1,891,895 | 61.56 | 6 | Communist Refoundation Party | 119,505 | 4.15 | 2 |
| Antonio Bassolino | 1,891,895 | 61.56 | 6 | Federation of the Greens | 99,430 | 3.45 | 2 |
| Antonio Bassolino | 1,891,895 | 61.56 | 6 | Party of Italian Communists | 78,307 | 2.72 | 1 |
| Antonio Bassolino | 1,891,895 | 61.56 | 6 | Italy of Values–Consumers' List | 68,741 | 2.38 | 1 |
| Antonio Bassolino | 1,891,895 | 61.56 | 6 | Republicans | 41,170 | 1.43 | 1 |
| Antonio Bassolino | 1,891,895 | 61.56 | 6 | Federalist Democracy | 29,179 | 1.01 | – |
| Antonio Bassolino | 1,891,895 | 61.56 | 6 | European Republicans Movement | 26,385 | 0.92 | – |
| Antonio Bassolino | 1,891,895 | 61.56 | 6 | Civic Government | 15,956 | 0.55 | – |
| Antonio Bassolino | 1,891,895 | 61.56 | 6 | Total | 1,823,321 | 63.26 | 32 |
| Italo Bocchino | 1,056,445 | 34.38 | 1 | | | | |
| Italo Bocchino | 1,056,445 | 34.38 | 1 | Forza Italia | 344,148 | 11.94 | 8 |
| Italo Bocchino | 1,056,445 | 34.38 | 1 | National Alliance | 304,828 | 10.58 | 7 |
| Italo Bocchino | 1,056,445 | 34.38 | 1 | Union of Christian and Centre Democrats | 194,640 | 6.75 | 4 |
| Italo Bocchino | 1,056,445 | 34.38 | 1 | Socialist Party – New PSI | 84,376 | 2.93 | 2 |
| Italo Bocchino | 1,056,445 | 34.38 | 1 | Italian Republican Party | 27,620 | 0.96 | – |
| Italo Bocchino | 1,056,445 | 34.38 | 1 | Pensioners' Party | 10,315 | 0.36 | – |
| Italo Bocchino | 1,056,445 | 34.38 | 1 | Social Idea Movement | 2,382 | 0.08 | – |
| Italo Bocchino | 1,056,445 | 34.38 | 1 | Total | 968,309 | 33.59 | 21 |
| Gianfranco Rotondi | 65,226 | 2.12 | – | Christian Democracy | 55,378 | 1.92 | – |
| Alessandra Mussolini | 59,470 | 1.94 | – | Social Alternative | 35,424 | 1.23 | – |
| Total candidates | 3,073,036 | 100.00 | 7 | Total parties | 2,882,432 | 100.00 | 53 |
Source: Ministry of the Interior
