= Roberto Fico =

Italian politician (born 1974)

The Honourable Roberto Fico
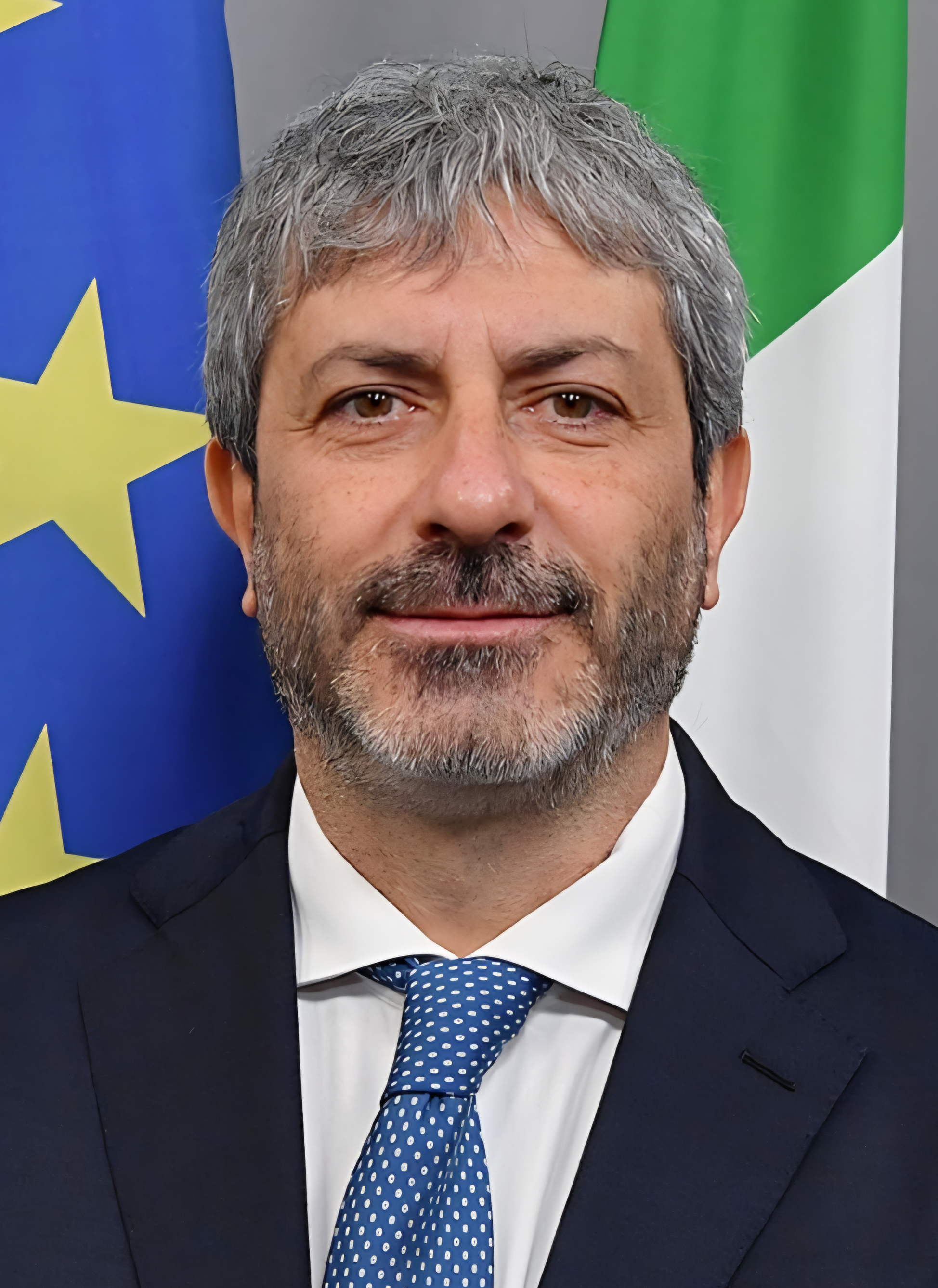
- Fico in 2025

President of Campania
- Incumbent
- Assumed office 9 December 2025
- Preceded by: Vincenzo De Luca

President of the Chamber of Deputies
- In office 24 March 2018 – 12 October 2022
- Preceded by: Laura Boldrini
- Succeeded by: Lorenzo Fontana

Member of the Chamber of Deputies
- In office 15 March 2013 – 12 October 2022
- Constituency: Campania 1 (2013–2018); Naples–Fuorigrotta (2018–2022)

Personal details
- Born: 10 October 1974 (age 52) Naples, Campania, Italy
- Party: Five Star Movement
- Education: University of Trieste
- Profession: Communication and marketing manager

Roberto Fico (Italian pronunciation: [roˈbɛrto ˈfiːko]; born 10 October 1974) is an Italian politician who has been serving as President of Campania since 9 December 2025. He served as the Chairman of the RAI Supervision Commission from 2013 to 2018 and President of the Italian Chamber of Deputies from 2018 to 2022.

== Early life ==
Fico was born in Naples in 1974 to a middle-class family. He studied communication studies at the University of Trieste and did an Erasmus exchange at the University of Helsinki, graduating in 2001 with a thesis regarding the social and linguistic identity of Neapolitan neomelodic music. After the university, he worked for some press offices, in a hotel, as a tour operator manager, in a call-center, in a butcher's shop, and as a small importer of fabrics from Morocco.

== Political career ==
On 18 July 2005, he founded one of the forty "Friends of Beppe Grillo" meetups in Naples, which led to the formation of the Five Star Movement. In 2010, he ran as President of Campania region, but only received 1.35% of the votes in the election. In 2011, he was the M5S candidate for Mayor of Naples, getting only 1.38% of votes, unable to exceed the first round.

In December 2012, Fico arrived first, with 228 preferences obtained on the web, in the parliamentary primary election of the M5S; he was nominated for the first position on the M5S list of the constituency Campania 1. In February 2013, he was elected to the 17th Italian Parliament.

In 2013, Fico was voted by his parliamentary group to the Presidency of the Chamber of Deputies without being elected. On 6 June 2013, he was elected Chairman of the RAI Supervision Commission. Fico has renounced the function allowance to which he would have been entitled as Chairman of the RAI Supervision Commission and the personal car.

As president of the RAI Supervision Commission, during his presidency, he introduced the live streaming broadcast on the web TV of the Chamber of Deputies of all the auditions, the publication on the Parliament website of the questions addressed by the commissioners to RAI and the related answers and the determination of a maximum of 15 days for the answers to the questions by the public radio and television company. Among the acts approved by the Commission, there was a resolution aimed at resolving and avoiding possible conflicts of interest.

As a deputy, he also presented a draft law on the governance of RAI; one of the points, the plan for corporate transparency, has merged into the RAI reform approved in 2015 by the Parliament. Following the implementation of this plan, the company had to make public the remuneration of senior managers, editorial departments, and journalistic publications.

=== President of the Chamber of Deputies ===
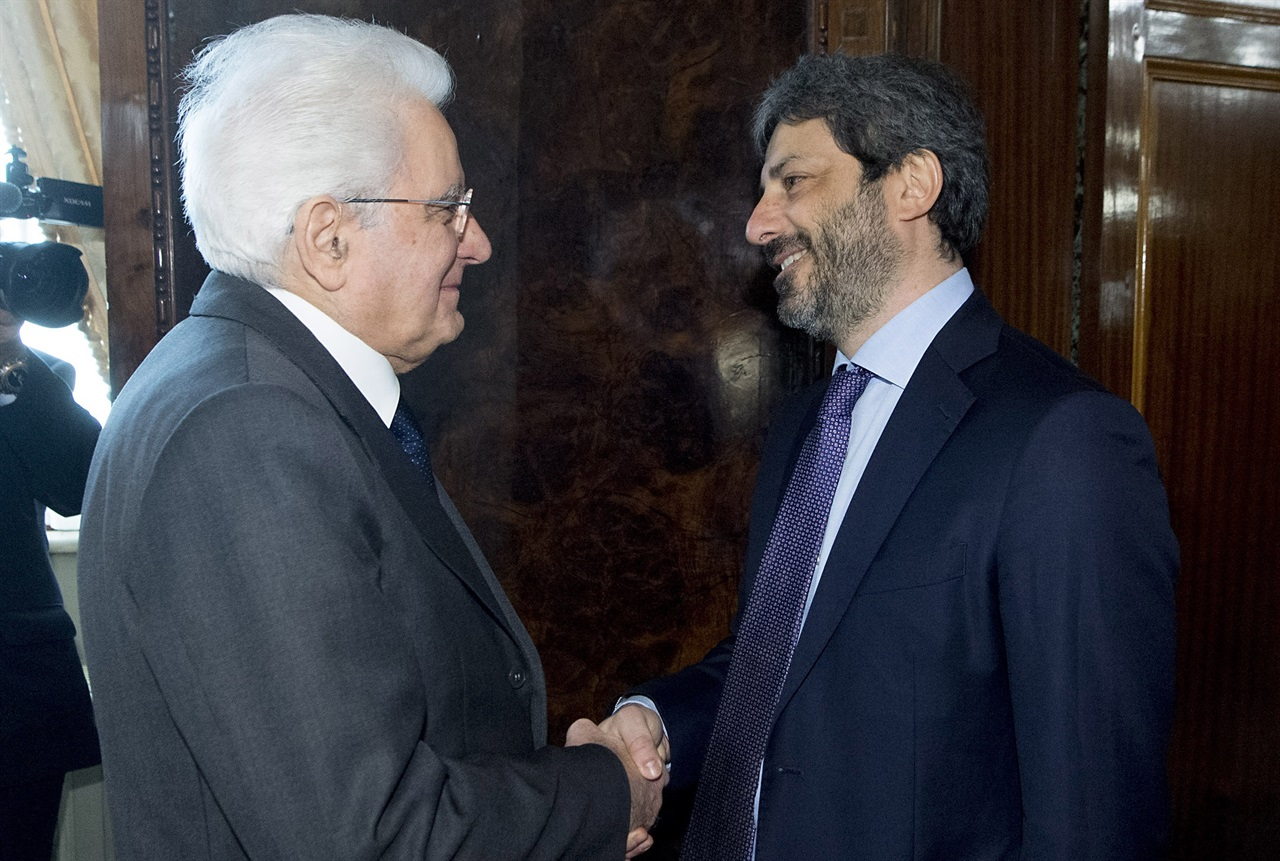
Fico with President Sergio Mattarella in March 2018.

In March 2018, he was re-elected in the constituency of Naples–Fuorigrotta with 57.6% of votes. On 24 March 2018, Fico was elected as President of the Chamber of Deputies, supported by his own party, the League, Forza Italia and Brothers of Italy.

On 23 April 2018, after the failure of the mandate for the President of the Senate, Elisabetta Casellati, to start a government between the M5S and the centre-right coalition, he was given an exploratory mandate by President Sergio Mattarella to try and reconcile the issues between the Five Star Movement and the Democratic Party. His charge was to break the post-election political deadlock so they could form a fully functional new government.

His first year as President was characterized by a strong opposition to the policies promoted by Interior Minister Matteo Salvini, which were particularly severe on immigration and security.

== Political views ==
Fico often stated that he was in favor of extending the right to marriage and adoption to same-sex couples. He also supports euthanasia for the terminally ill and the so-called jus soli, which is the right of anyone born in the territory of a state to nationality or citizenship. Fico is considered the leader of the left-wing faction of the Five Star Movement, often in opposition to Luigi Di Maio.

== Electoral history ==
Election	House	Constituency	Party	Votes	Result
2013	Chamber of Deputies	Campania 1	M5S	– (Note: Elected in a closed list proportional representation system.)	Elected
2018	Chamber of Deputies	Naples – Fuorigrotta	M5S	61,819	Elected

=== First-past-the-post elections ===
2018 general election (C): Naples – Fuorigrotta
Candidate	Coalition or Party	Votes	%
Roberto Fico	Five Star Movement	61,819	57.6
Marta Schifone	Centre-right coalition	21,651	20.2
Daniela Iaconis	Centre-left coalition	15,779	14.7
Others		8,120	7.5
Total		107,369	100.0

Political offices
Preceded by Laura Boldrini	President of the Italian Chamber of Deputies; 2018–2022	Succeeded by Lorenzo Fontana
