= 1970 Campania regional election =

The Campania regional election of 1970 took place on 7–8 June 1970.

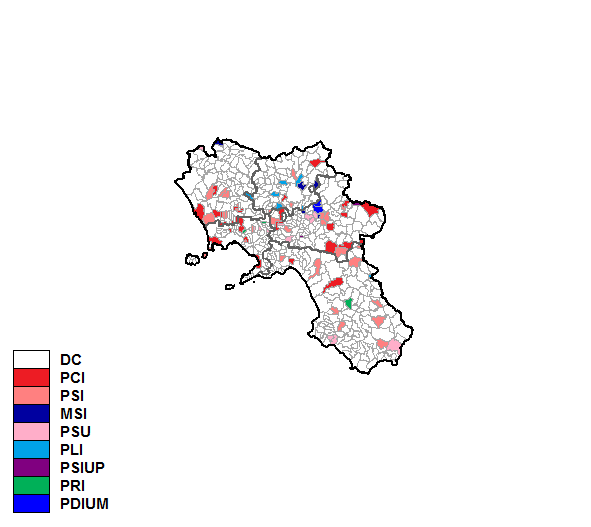
Largest party by municipality

== Events ==
Christian Democracy was by far the largest party, gaining almost twice the share of vote of the Italian Communist Party, which came second. After the election, Christian Democrat Carlo Leone was elected President of the Region, but as soon as in 1971 he was replaced by fellow Christian Democrat Nicola Mancino. In 1972 Mancino was replaced by Alberto Servidio, to whom Vittorio Cascetta succeeded in 1973.

== Results ==
Parties	votes	votes (%)	seats
Christian Democracy	1,001,340	39.6	25
Italian Communist Party	551,599	21.8	13
Italian Socialist Party	276,225	10.9	7
Italian Social Movement	222,918	8.8	5
Unitary Socialist Party	177,874	7.0	4
Italian Liberal Party	89,825	3.6	2
Italian Republican Party	77,513	3.1	2
Italian Socialist Party of Proletarian Unity	64,098	2.5	1
Italian Democratic Party of Monarchist Unity	58,993	2.3	1
Pensioners of Italy Autonomous Party	6,385	0.3	-
Total	2,526,770	100.0	60

Source: Ministry of the Interior
