= Antonio Bassolino =

Italian politician (born 1947)

Antonio Bassolino OMRI
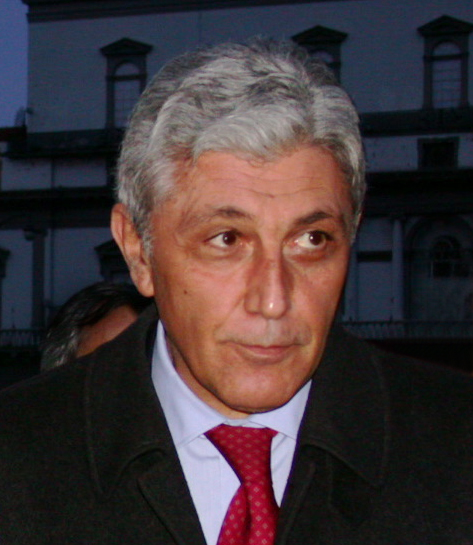

President of Campania
- In office 18 May 2000 – 17 April 2010
- Preceded by: Andrea Losco
- Succeeded by: Stefano Caldoro

Minister of Labour and Social Security
- In office 21 October 1998 – 21 June 1999
- Prime Minister: Massimo D'Alema
- Preceded by: Tiziano Treu
- Succeeded by: Cesare Salvi

Mayor of Naples
- In office 6 December 1993 – 24 May 2000
- Preceded by: Francesco Tagliamonte
- Succeeded by: Rosa Russo Iervolino

Member of the Chamber of Deputies
- In office 2 July 1987 – 11 January 1994
- Constituency: Catanzaro (1987–1992); Naples (1992–1994)

Personal details
- Born: 20 March 1947 (age 79) Afragola, Italy
- Party: PCI (1970–1991); PDS (1991–1998); DS (1998–2007); PD (2007–2017)
- Height: 1.73 m (5 ft 8 in)
- Spouse: Anna Maria Carloni
- Children: 2
- Profession: politician

Antonio Bassolino (born 20 March 1947) is an Italian politician. He was the president of Campania from 2000 to 2010 and the mayor of Naples from 1993 to 2000.

== Biography ==
Bassolino was born in Afragola, Campania. At 17, he entered the Italian Communist Youth Federation, and in 1970 he became a member of the regional council for the Italian Communist Party (PCI), and, the following year, secretary of the party section in Avellino. He held the latter position until 1975, when he became regional secretary for the PCI; from 1972, he was a member of the party's national committee.

=== Deputy ===
In 1987, he was elected to the Italian Chamber of Deputies in the College of Catanzaro, becoming president of the Parliament media committee in 1990.

In the process leading to the split-up of the PCI into the Democratic Party of the Left (PDS) and the Party of the Communist Refoundation (PRC), Bassolino represented the moderate wing that sought mediation. Eventually, he joined the PDS.

=== Mayor and minister ===
In 1992, he was reelected to the Chamber, and, in 1993, he was sent to Naples to reform the local section of PDS — which had been involved in the Tangentopoli bribing scandal. There he gained fame as a "hardman," a reputation which surfaced during the subsequent election for mayor, which he won by defeating the right-wing candidate, Alessandra Mussolini.

Bassolino's years as mayor of Naples are generally viewed as a period of civil, economical and social renaissance for the city. In 1997, he was reelected, this time with 72.9% of the votes. In October 1998, Premier Massimo D'Alema nominated him Minister of Welfare; however, after the assassination of his advisor Massimo D'Antona in October 1999, Bassolino resigned in order to focus his activities on Naples.

=== President of Campania ===
In 2000, he ran for the presidency of Campania, which raised some controversies. He was elected with 54.3% of the votes, and, in the elections of April 2005, with 61.6%. Among his accomplishments as governor of Campania are the construction of a regional metropolitan rail service and the new TAV station for high-speed trains in his native Afragola. Bassolino received the "Gold Star" Prize for his commitment to developing tourism and cultural ventures in Naples during his years as mayor. His essays include Mezzogiorno alla prova (1980) and La repubblica delle città (1996).

However, it has been argued that, under his administration, the regional debt has doubled. Moreover, and more importantly Bassolino has a considerable share of responsibility in the environmental disaster in the Campania region due to the deficiencies of the rubbish collection and treatment systems. In fact Bassolino is one of the 29 people remanded for trial and accused of involvement in ongoing aggravated fraud against the State and fraud regarding public works. The collapse of the services which were supposed to collect and treat the rubbish led to the accumulation of garbage in the streets of the major urban centres to the point that schools and other public places had to be closed for some days and tourism declined substantially in 2008. As a result of this an increasing number of citizens and associations have been vocally calling for Bassolino's resignation.

He is married to Anna Maria Carloni, who was elected to the Senate in the XV legislature.

== Electoral history ==
Election	House	Constituency	Party	Votes	Result
1970	Regional Council of Campania	Naples	PCI	18,663	Elected
1980	Regional Council of Campania	Naples	PCI	98,128	Elected
1987	Chamber of Deputies	Catanzaro–Cosenza–Reggio Calabria	PCI	116,953	Elected
1992	Chamber of Deputies	Naples–Caserta	PDS	17,158	Elected

== Honour ==
- Italy: Knight Grand Cross of the Order of Merit of the Italian Republic (30 june 2003)
