= 1985 Campania regional election =

The Campania regional election of 1985 took place on 12 May 1985.

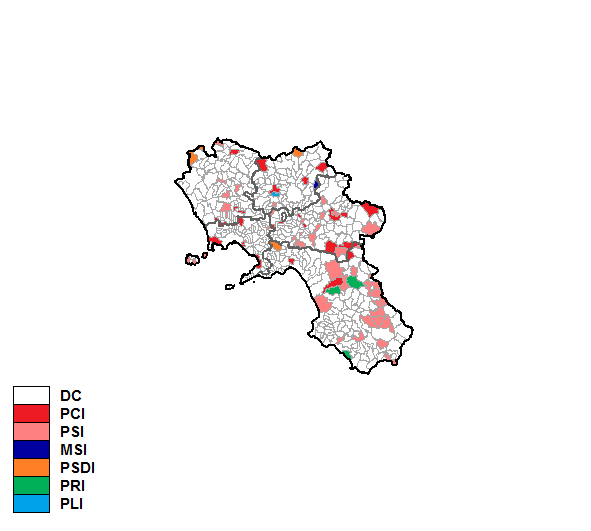
Largest party by municipality

== Events ==
Christian Democracy was by far the largest party, while the Italian Communist Party came distantly second. After the election Antonio Fantini, the incumbent Christian Democratic President, formed a new centre-left government (Pentapartito). In 1989 Fantini, who had been elected to the European Parliament, was replaced by fellow Christian Democrat Ferdinando Clemente.

== Results ==
Parties	votes	votes (%)	seats
Christian Democracy	1,253,462	39.0	24
Italian Communist Party	730,413	22.7	14
Italian Socialist Party	458,689	14.3	9
Italian Social Movement	289,835	9.0	5
Italian Democratic Socialist Party	173,421	5.4	3
Italian Republican Party	117,537	3.7	2
Italian Liberal Party	73,948	2.3	1
Proletarian Democracy	36,273	1.1	1
Green and Civic List	30,791	1.0	1
Ecological list	13,085	0.4	-
Pensioners' National Party	11,063	0.3	-
Pensioners Italian Alliance – Venetian League	9,671	0.3	-
Valdostan Union – Democratic Party – others	6,649	0.2	-
Local list	5,370	0.2	-
National Tenants Party	3,766	0.1	-
Humanist Party	2,097	0.1	-
National Monarchist Party	596	0.0	-
Total	3,216,666	100.0	60

Source: Ministry of the Interior
