= 1980 Campania regional election =

The Campania regional election of 1980 took place on 8 June 1980.

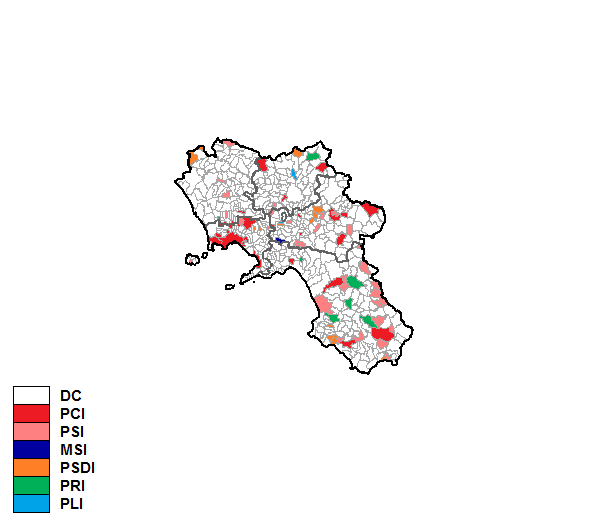
Largest party by municipality

== Events ==
Christian Democracy was by far the largest party, while the Italian Communist Party came distantly second. After the election, Christian Democrat Emilio De Feo was elected President of the Region. In 1983 De Feo was replaced by fellow Christian Democrat Antonio Fantini.

== Results ==
Parties	votes	votes (%)	seats
Christian Democracy	1,174,943	39.0	25
Italian Communist Party	726,007	24.1	15
Italian Socialist Party	377,581	12.5	7
Italian Social Movement	339,993	11.3	7
Italian Democratic Socialist Party	187,781	6.2	3
Italian Republican Party	90,206	3.0	1
Italian Liberal Party	51,600	1.7	1
Proletarian Democracy	33,163	1.1	1
Proletarian Unity Party	30,693	1.0	-
Revolutionary Socialist League	1,651	0.1	-
Total	3,013,618	100.0	60

Source: Ministry of the Interior
