= 1990 Campania regional election =

The Campania regional election of 1990 took place on 6 and 7 May 1990.

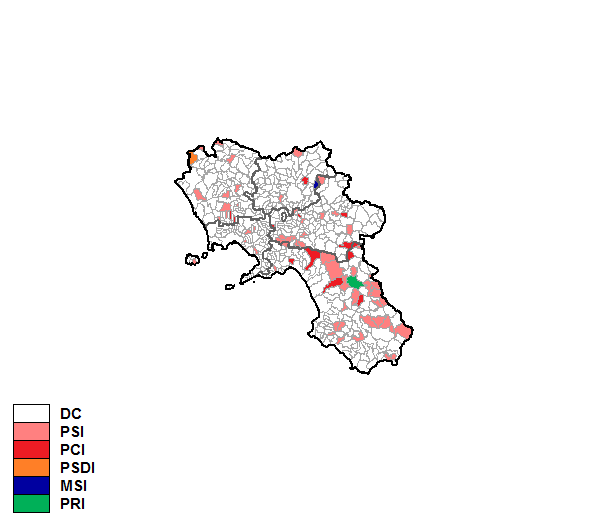
Largest party by municipality

== Events ==
Christian Democracy was by far the largest party, gaining more than double of the share of vote of its main competitors, the Italian Communist Party, which had its worst result ever in a regional election, and the Italian Socialist Party, that obtained its best result ever.

After the election Ferdinando Clemente, the incumbent Christian Democratic President, formed a new centre-left government (Pentapartito). In 1993 Clemente was replaced by fellow Christian Democrat Giovanni Grasso.

== Results ==
Parties	votes	votes (%)	seats
Christian Democracy	1,325,686	40.8	25
Italian Socialist Party	616,681	19.0	12
Italian Communist Party	542,496	16.7	10
Italian Democratic Socialist Party	161,022	5.0	3
Italian Social Movement	159,787	4.9	3
Italian Republican Party	155,550	4.8	3
Green List	86,847	2.7	2
Italian Liberal Party	81,484	2.5	1
Rainbow Greens	43,201	1.3	1
Antiprohibitionists on Drugs	28,430	0.9	-
Proletarian Democracy	26,538	0.8	-
Pensioners' List	10,249	0.3	-
Southern League Campania	7,501	0.2	-
New People's Party	1,164	0.0	-
Total	3,246,636	100.0	60

Source: Ministry of the Interior
