= Andrea Losco =

Italian politician

Andrea Losco (born 31 March 1951) is an Italian politician. He was a member of the European Parliament from 8 May 2006, when he took up a seat vacated after the 2006 Italian general election, until the 2009 European elections. He represented the Olive Tree coalition within the ALDE parliamentary group.
