= List of members of the Chamber of Deputies of Italy, 2022–present =

Current composition of the Italian Chamber of Deputies

This is a list of the 400 members of the Legislature XIX of Italy of the Italian Chamber of Deputies. All of them were elected in the snap 2022 Italian general election and assumed office on 13 October 2022.

The list of those elected was confirmed by the minutes from the National Central Electoral Office, at the Supreme Court of Cassation, which on 8 October 2022 concluded the process of assigning seats.

== Current composition ==
Constituency	Deputy	Party	Group	Birth date	Notes	Ref.
Sicilia 1 – U01	Davide Aiello	Five Star Movement	Five Star Movement	31 October 1985		
Marche – P01	Lucia Albano	Brothers of Italy	Brothers of Italy	11 February 1965		
Campania 2 – P01	Enrica Alifano	Five Star Movement	Five Star Movement	31 January 1967		
Lombardia 3 – P02	Cristina Almici	Brothers of Italy	Brothers of Italy	26 June 1969		
Campania 1 – U07	Gaetano Amato	Five Star Movement	Five Star Movement	5 June 1957		
Trentino-Alto Adige – P01	Alessia Ambrosi	Brothers of Italy	Brothers of Italy	14 February 1982		
Basilicata – P01	Vincenzo Amendola	Democratic Party	Democratic Party – Democratic and Progressive Italy	22 December 1973		
Piemonte 2 – P02	Enzo Amich	Brothers of Italy	Brothers of Italy	26 July 1977		
Toscana – P01	Alessandro Amorese	Brothers of Italy	Brothers of Italy	8 October 1974		
Veneto 1 – U02	Giorgia Andreuzza	League	League for Salvini Premier	11 December 1973		
Lazio 1 – P02	Antonio Angelucci	League	Lega for Salvini Premier	16 September 1944		
Calabria – P01	Alfredo Antoniozzi	Brothers of Italy	Brothers of Italy	18 March 1956		
Piemonte 2 – P02	Chiara Appendino	Five Star Movement	Five Star Movement	12 June 1984		
Calabria – U04	Giovanni Arruzzolo	Forza Italia	Forza Italia – Berlusconi for President	30 March 1960		
Umbria – P01	Anna Ascani	Democratic Party	Democratic Party – Democratic and Progressive Italy	17 October 1987		
Emilia-Romagna – P02	Stefania Ascari	Five Star Movement	Five Star Movement	3 March 1980		
Campania 1 – U05	Carmela Auriemma	Five Star Movement	Five Star Movement	3 July 1981		
Abruzzo – P01	Alberto Bagnai	League	Lega for Salvini Premier	10 December 1962		
Liguria – U04	Roberto Bagnasco	Forza Italia	Forza Italia – Berlusconi for President	7 April 1950		
Emilia-Romagna – P03	Ouidad Bakkali	Democratic Party	Democratic Party – Democratic and Progressive Italy	15 March 1986		
Marche – P01	Antonio Baldelli	Brothers of Italy	Brothers of Italy	24 June 1971		
Calabria – P01	Vittoria Baldino	Five Star Movement	Five Star Movement	28 May 1988		
Toscana – P01	Andrea Barabotti	League	Lega for Salvini Premier	14 September 1985		
Sicilia 2 – P03	Anthony Barbagallo	Democratic Party	Democratic Party – Democratic and Progressive Italy	24 December 1975		
Lazio 1 – P02	Paolo Barelli	Forza Italia	Forza Italia – Berlusconi for President	7 June 1954		
Lombardia 4 – P01	Valentina Barzotti	Five Star Movement	Five Star Movement	5 February 1986		
Lazio 1 – U05	Alessandro Battilocchio	New PSI	Forza Italia – Berlusconi for President	3 May 1977		
Marche – U01	Francesco Battistoni	Forza Italia	Forza Italia – Berlusconi for President	23 February 1967		
Puglia – U05	Davide Bellomo	Forza Italia	Forza Italia – Berlusconi for President	18 February 1970	Elected from League; previously in Mixed Group – N-I	
Lazio 1 – P02	Maria Teresa Bellucci	Brothers of Italy	Brothers of Italy	19 July 1972		
Lombardia 2 – P02	Stefano Benigni	Forza Italia	Forza Italia – Berlusconi for President	16 May 1987		
Marche – U03	Stefano Maria Benvenuti Gostoli	Brothers of Italy	Brothers of Italy	17 January 1976		
Piemonte 1 – P02	Alessandro Manuel Benvenuto	League	Lega for Salvini Premier	23 July 1986		
Lombardia 3 – P02	Fabrizio Benzoni	Action	Action	4 November 1985		
Emilia-Romagna – P03	Davide Bergamini	National Future	Mixed Group – National Future	7 February 1983	Elected from League; previously in Forza Italia	
Toscana – P01	Deborah Bergamini	Forza Italia	Forza Italia – Berlusconi for President	24 October 1967		
Piemonte 1 – P02	Mauro Berruto	Democratic Party	Democratic Party – Democratic and Progressive Italy	8 May 1969		
Campania 2 – U06	Giuseppe Bicchielli	Forza Italia	Forza Italia – Berlusconi for President	31 March 1967	Elected from Italy in the Centre; previously in Us Moderates	
Emilia-Romagna – P02	Galeazzo Bignami	Brothers of Italy	Brothers of Italy	25 October 1975		
Estero – Europa	Simone Billi	League	Lega for Salvini Premier	11 February 1976		
Veneto 1 – U05	Ingrid Bisa	League	Lega for Salvini Premier	10 January 1978		
Veneto 1 – P01	Gianangelo Bof	National Future	Mixed Group – National Future	7 January 1975	Elected from League	
Toscana – P02	Laura Boldrini	Democratic Party	Democratic Party – Democratic and Progressive Italy	28 April 1961		
Toscana – P03	Simona Bonafé	Democratic Party	Democratic Party – Democratic and Progressive Italy	12 July 1973		
Emilia-Romagna – U05	Angelo Bonelli	Green Europe	Greens and Left Alliance	30 July 1962		
Veneto 2 – P02	Elena Bonetti	Action	Action	12 April 1974	Elected from Italia Viva	
Toscana – P03	Francesco Bonifazi	Italia Viva	Italia Viva	24 June 1976		
Lombardia 3 – U03	Simona Bordonali	League	Lega for Salvini Premier	1 August 1971		
Campania 1 – P02	Francesco Emilio Borrelli	Green Europe	Greens and Left Alliance	14 August 1973		
Veneto 2 – P03	Paola Boscaini	Forza Italia	Forza Italia – Berlusconi for President	22 September 1954	Replaced Flavio Tosi	
Lazio 1 – P03	Maria Elena Boschi	Italia Viva	Italia Viva	21 January 1981		
Lombardia 2 – P02	Chiara Braga	Democratic Party	Democratic Party – Democratic and Progressive Italy	2 September 1979		
Sicilia 1 – U04	Michela Vittoria Brambilla	MA–Us Moderates	Us Moderates–Associative Movement of Italians Abroad–Popular Centre	26 October 1967	Elected on Forza Italia list; previously independent	
Campania 1 – P01	Raffaele Bruno	Five Star Movement	Five Star Movement	3 May 1974		
Liguria – P01	Francesco Bruzzone	League	Lega for Salvini Premier	23 May 1962		
Emilia-Romagna – U08	Alice Buonguerrieri	Brothers of Italy	Brothers of Italy	4 September 1978		
Emilia-Romagna – P03	Federico Cafiero De Raho	Five Star Movement	Five Star Movement	18 February 1952		
Basilicata – U01	Salvatore Caiata	Brothers of Italy	Brothers of Italy	19 July 1970		
Sicilia 2 – U05	Tommaso Calderone	Forza Italia	Forza Italia – Berlusconi for President	30 January 1963		
Lombardia 3 – U05	Giangiacomo Calovini	Brothers of Italy	Brothers of Italy	16 March 1982		
Lombardia 2 – U02	Stefano Candiani	League	Lega for Salvini Premier	11 December 1971		
Campania 2 – U01	Gerolamo Cangiano	Brothers of Italy	Brothers of Italy	19 March 1981		
Sicilia 2 – U04	Giovanni Luca Cannata	Brothers of Italy	Brothers of Italy	17 May 1979		
Calabria – U05	Francesco Cannizzaro	Forza Italia	Forza Italia – Berlusconi for President	24 June 1982		
Sicilia 2 – P02	Luciano Cantone	Five Star Movement	Five Star Movement	24 May 1987		
Umbria – U02	Virginio Caparvi	League	Lega for Salvini Premier	25 September 1982		
Sardegna – U01	Ugo Cappellacci	Forza Italia	Forza Italia – Berlusconi for President	27 May 1960		
Veneto 2 – P01	Enrico Cappelletti	Five Star Movement	Five Star Movement	5 February 1968		
Sicilia 1 – P01	Gianluca Caramanna	Brothers of Italy	Brothers of Italy	25 July 1975		
Campania 1 – P02	Alessandro Caramiello	Five Star Movement	Five Star Movement	7 July 1977		
Estero – Africa Asia Oceania	Nicola Carè	Democratic Party	Democratic Party – Democratic and Progressive Italy	31 July 1960		
Veneto 2 – U05	Maria Cristina Caretta	Brothers of Italy	Brothers of Italy	11 January 1964		
Puglia – P04	Mara Carfagna	Us Moderates	Us Moderates–Associative Movement of Italians Abroad–Popular Centre	18 December 1975	Elected from Action	
Marche – U04	Mirco Carloni	League	Lega for Salvini Premier	14 January 1981		
Sicilia 1 – P02	Ida Carmina	Five Star Movement	Five Star Movement	16 November 1963		
Puglia – P04	Andrea Caroppo	Forza Italia	Forza Italia – Berlusconi for President	26 June 1979		
Campania 1 – U03	Dario Carotenuto	Five Star Movement	Five Star Movement	11 February 1978		
Sicilia 2 – P02	Anastasio Carrà	League	Lega for Salvini Premier	30 March 1964		
Lombardia 3 – U04	Maurizio Casasco	Forza Italia	Forza Italia – Berlusconi for President	7 September 1954		
Campania 1 – U01	Antonio Caso	Five Star Movement	Five Star Movement	5 February 1984		
Sicilia 2 – P02	Giuseppe Castiglione	Forza Italia	Forza Italia – Berlusconi for President	5 October 1963	Elected from Action	
Lazio 1 – P02	Andrea Casu	Democratic Party	Democratic Party – Democratic and Progressive Italy	6 November 1981		
Lombardia 4 – U01	Alessandro Cattaneo	Forza Italia	Forza Italia – Berlusconi for President	12 June 1979		
Trentino-Alto Adige – U02	Vanessa Cattoi	League	Lega for Salvini Premier	12 July 1980		
Emilia-Romagna – U02	Laura Cavandoli	League	Lega for Salvini Premier	15 December 1971		
Liguria – U02	Ilaria Cavo	Us Moderates	Us Moderates–Associative Movement of Italians Abroad–Popular Centre	11 October 1973	Elected from Italy in the Centre	
Lombardia 1 – U04	Fabrizio Cecchetti	League	Lega for Salvini Premier	3 December 1977		
Lombardia 3 – P01	Giulio Centemero	League	Lega for Salvini Premier	30 January 1979		
Veneto 2 – U02	Giulio Centenaro	League	Lega for Salvini Premier	26 March 1966	Replaced Massimo Bitonci	
Campania 2 – P01	Marco Cerreto	Brothers of Italy	Brothers of Italy	1 January 1971		
Molise – U01	Lorenzo Cesa	Union of the Centre	Mixed Group – N-I	16 August 1951		
Sardegna – P01	Susanna Cherchi	Five Star Movement	Five Star Movement	23 December 1955		
Lombardia 4 – P01	Paola Maria Chiesa	Brothers of Italy	Brothers of Italy	12 September 1979		
Piemonte 2 – U05	Monica Ciaburro	Brothers of Italy	Brothers of Italy	12 April 1970		
Sicilia 2 – U03	Francesco Ciancitto	Brothers of Italy	Brothers of Italy	17 March 1967		
Lazio 1 – U02	Paolo Ciani	Solidary Democracy	Democratic Party – Democratic and Progressive Italy	15 May 1970		
Lazio 1 – U06	Luciano Ciocchetti	Brothers of Italy	Brothers of Italy	3 March 1958		
Campania 2 – P02	Edmondo Cirielli	Brothers of Italy	Brothers of Italy	22 May 1964		
Veneto 1 – U04	Dimitri Coin	League	Lega for Salvini Premier	1 June 1970		
Emilia-Romagna – P02	Beatriz Colombo	Brothers of Italy	Brothers of Italy	13 March 1978		
Lazio 2 – U03	Chiara Colosimo	Brothers of Italy	Brothers of Italy	2 June 1986		
Puglia – U10	Alessandro Colucci	Us Moderates	Us Moderates–Associative Movement of Italians Abroad–Popular Centre	20 May 1974	Elected from Us with Italy	
Lazio 1 – P02	Alfonso Colucci	Five Star Movement	Five Star Movement	24 February 1964		
Lombardia 4 – U03	Silvana Comaroli	League	Lega for Salvini Premier	27 March 1967		
Piemonte 2 – P02	Fabrizio Comba	Brothers of Italy	Brothers of Italy	24 March 1966		
Puglia – U09	Saverio Congedo	Brothers of Italy	Brothers of Italy	15 February 1965		
Lombardia 1 – P02	Giuseppe Conte	Five Star Movement	Five Star Movement	8 August 1964	M5S leader	
Piemonte 2 – U04	Marcello Coppo	Brothers of Italy	Brothers of Italy	27 November 1978		
Veneto 1 – P01	Piergiorgio Cortelazzo	Forza Italia	Forza Italia – Berlusconi for President	20 February 1969		
Lombardia 1 – P02	Enrico Costa	Forza Italia	Forza Italia – Berlusconi for President	29 November 1969	Elected from Action	
Campania 1 – U02	Sergio Costa	Five Star Movement	Five Star Movement	22 April 1959		
Lombardia 1 – U02	Andrea Crippa	League	Lega for Salvini Premier	10 May 1986		
Lombardia 1 – P01	Gianni Cuperlo	Democratic Party	Democratic Party – Democratic and Progressive Italy	3 September 1961		
Marche – P01	Augusto Curti	Democratic Party	Democratic Party – Democratic and Progressive Italy	4 March 1978		
Campania 2 – P02	Antonio D'Alessio	Action	Action	5 December 1964		
Abruzzo – P01	Luciano D'Alfonso	Democratic Party	Democratic Party – Democratic and Progressive Italy	13 December 1965		
Puglia – U04	Rita dalla Chiesa	Forza Italia	Forza Italia – Berlusconi for President	31 August 1947		
Lombardia 4 – U04	Andrea Dara	League	Lega for Salvini Premier	7 January 1979		
Puglia – U07	Mauro D'Attis	Forza Italia	Forza Italia – Berlusconi for President	30 July 1973		
Trentino-Alto Adige – U01	Andrea de Bertoldi	Christian Democratic Liberals (LCD)	Lega for Salvini Premier	12 May 1966	Elected from Brothers of Italy; previously independent	
Lombardia 1 – U04	Riccardo De Corato	Brothers of Italy	Brothers of Italy	1 November 1951		
Sardegna – P01	Salvatore Deidda	Brothers of Italy	Brothers of Italy	7 October 1976		
Lombardia 4 – P01	Mauro Del Barba	Italia Viva	Italia Viva	20 July 1970		
Lombardia 1 – U09	Benedetto Della Vedova	More Europe	Mixed Group – More Europe	3 April 1962		
Puglia – P02	Gianmauro Dell'Olio	Five Star Movement	Five Star Movement	7 March 1968		
Piemonte 2 – U03	Andrea Delmastro Delle Vedove	Brothers of Italy	Brothers of Italy	22 October 1976		
Campania 2 – P02	Piero De Luca	Democratic Party	Democratic Party – Democratic and Progressive Italy	11 June 1980		
Emilia-Romagna – U07	Andrea De Maria	Democratic Party	Democratic Party – Democratic and Progressive Italy	5 October 1966		
Emilia-Romagna – P01	Paola De Micheli	Democratic Party	Democratic Party – Democratic and Progressive Italy	1 September 1973		
Friuli-Venezia Giulia – P01	Isabella De Monte	Forza Italia	Forza Italia – Berlusconi for President	23 June 1971	Elected from Action; previously joined Italia Viva	
Puglia – P03	Vito De Palma	Forza Italia	Forza Italia – Berlusconi for President	25 December 1958		
Lazio 1 – P02	Michela Di Biase	Democratic Party	Democratic Party – Democratic and Progressive Italy	17 October 1980		
Estero – North Central America	Andrea Di Giuseppe	Brothers of Italy	Brothers of Italy	20 May 1968		
Campania 1 – U06	Carmen Di Lauro	Five Star Movement	Five Star Movement	24 March 1988		
Lombardia 1 – P02	Grazia Di Maggio	Brothers of Italy	Brothers of Italy	11 November 1994		
Puglia – P04	Salvatore Marcello Di Mattina	League	Lega for Salvini Premier	5 January 1970		
Veneto 2 – U01	Alberto Di Rubba	League	Lega for Salvini Premier	26 January 1979	Replaced Alberto Stefani	
Estero – North Central America	Christian Diego Di Sanzo	Democratic Party	Democratic Party – Democratic and Progressive Italy	18 November 1982		
Emilia-Romagna – U04	Daniela Dondi	Brothers of Italy	Brothers of Italy	12 January 1962		
Puglia – P04	Leonardo Donno	Five Star Movement	Five Star Movement	21 July 1985		
Toscana – P03	Giovanni Donzelli	Brothers of Italy	Brothers of Italy	28 November 1975		
Lombardia 2 – P02	Devis Dori	Green Europe	Greens and Left Alliance	27 December 1979		
Sicilia 1 – P01	Valentina D'Orso	Five Star Movement	Five Star Movement	29 July 1980		
Lombardia 1 – P01	Eleonora Evi	Democratic Party	Democratic Party – Democratic and Progressive Italy	20 November 1983	Elected from Green Europe	
Sicilia 1 – P02	Davide Faraone	Italia Viva	Italia Viva	19 July 1975		
Sicilia 1 – U06	Marta Fascina	Forza Italia	Forza Italia – Berlusconi for President	9 January 1990		
Veneto 1 – P01	Piero Fassino	Democratic Party	Democratic Party – Democratic and Progressive Italy	7 October 1949		
Marche – P01	Giorgio Fede	Five Star Movement	Five Star Movement	23 December 1961		
Lombardia 2 – P01	Antonio Ferrara	Five Star Movement	Five Star Movement	6 February 1969	Replaced Alessandra Todde	
Campania 2 – P02	Tullio Ferrante	Forza Italia	Forza Italia – Berlusconi for President	13 January 1989		
Trentino-Alto Adige – P01	Sara Ferrari	Democratic Party	Democratic Party – Democratic and Progressive Italy	5 January 1971		
Calabria – U03	Wanda Ferro	Brothers of Italy	Brothers of Italy	24 March 1968		
Veneto 1 – P01	Francesco Filini	Brothers of Italy	Brothers of Italy	4 September 1978		
Veneto 2 – P02	Rosanna Filippin	Democratic Party	Democratic Party – Democratic and Progressive Italy	8 February 1962	Replaced Enrico Letta	
Lazio 2 – P02	Ilaria Fontana	Five Star Movement	Five Star Movement	26 June 1984		
Veneto 2 – U06	Lorenzo Fontana	League	Lega for Salvini Premier	10 April 1980	Chamber President	
Lombardia 4 – P01	Antonella Forattini	Democratic Party	Democratic Party – Democratic and Progressive Italy	13 May 1966		
Lombardia 3 – P02	Paolo Formentini	League	Lega for Salvini Premier	30 April 1980		
Piemonte 2 – P01	Federico Fornaro	Democratic Party	Democratic Party – Democratic and Progressive Italy	9 December 1962	Elected from Art. 1	
Toscana – U08	Emiliano Fossi	Democratic Party	Democratic Party – Democratic and Progressive Italy	2 September 1973		
Emilia-Romagna – U01	Tommaso Foti	Brothers of Italy	Brothers of Italy	28 April 1960		
Lombardia 1 – U02	Paola Frassinetti	Brothers of Italy	Brothers of Italy	2 May 1956		
Lombardia 3 – U02	Rebecca Frassini	League	Lega for Salvini Premier	24 November 1988		
Toscana – P03	Nicola Fratoianni	Italian Left	Greens and Left Alliance	4 October 1972		
Lazio 1 – U07	Federico Freni	League	Lega for Salvini Premier	1 July 1980		
Liguria – P01	Maria Grazia Frijia	Brothers of Italy	Brothers of Italy	9 August 1974		
Toscana – P01	Marco Furfaro	Democratic Party	Democratic Party – Democratic and Progressive Italy	19 June 1980		
Calabria – U01	Domenico Furgiuele	National Future	Mixed Group – National Future	1 January 1983	Elected from League	
Puglia – P04	Antonio Maria Gabellone	Brothers of Italy	Brothers of Italy	16 September 1959	Replaced Raffaele Fitto	
Lombardia 2 – P02	Maria Chiara Gadda	Italia Viva	Italia Viva	6 February 1980		
Sicilia 2 – U06	Francesco Gallo	South calls North	Mixed Group – N-I	3 November 1966		
Veneto 2 – U03	Elisabetta Gardini	Brothers of Italy	Brothers of Italy	3 June 1956		
Puglia – U02	Giandiego Gatta	Forza Italia	Forza Italia – Berlusconi for President	10 April 1964		
Friuli-Venezia Giulia – U01	Vannia Gava	League	Lega for Salvini Premier	30 June 1974		
Trentino-Alto Adige – U04	Renate Gebhard	SVP	Mixed Group – Linguistic minorities	2 May 1977		
Puglia – P02	Marcello Gemmato	Brothers of Italy	Brothers of Italy	21 December 1972		
Calabria – U02	Andrea Gentile	Forza Italia	Forza Italia – Berlusconi for President	1 June 1980	Replaced Anna Laura Orrico	
Liguria – P01	Valentina Ghio	Democratic Party	Democratic Party – Democratic and Progressive Italy	5 May 1971		
Sardegna – P01	Francesca Ghirra	Progressive Party	Greens and Left Alliance	25 July 1978		
Piemonte 2 – P02	Andrea Giaccone	League	Lega for Salvini Premier	8 October 1976		
Lazio 1 – P01	Roberto Giachetti	Italia Viva	Italia Viva	24 April 1961		
Sardegna – U04	Dario Giagoni	League	Lega for Salvini Premier	15 February 1979		
Toscana – U07	Federico Gianassi	Democratic Party	Democratic Party – Democratic and Progressive Italy	21 May 1980		
Piemonte 1 – U04	Alessandro Giglio Vigna	League	Lega for Salvini Premier	13 December 1980		
Sicilia 1 – P02	Antonio Giordano	Brothers of Italy	Brothers of Italy	6 June 1964		
Lombardia 2 – U04	Giancarlo Giorgetti	League	Lega for Salvini Premier	16 December 1966		
Campania 2 – P02	Carmen Letizia Giorgianni	Brothers of Italy	Brothers of Italy	26 June 1977		
Veneto 2 – U04	Silvio Giovine	Brothers of Italy	Brothers of Italy	20 December 1983		
Lombardia 3 – P02	Gian Antonio Girelli	Democratic Party	Democratic Party – Democratic and Progressive Italy	15 September 1962		
Puglia – P01	Carla Giuliano	Five Star Movement	Five Star Movement	2 April 1983		
Emilia-Romagna – P03	Andrea Gnassi	Democratic Party	Democratic Party – Democratic and Progressive Italy	27 March 1969		
Toscana – P01	Irene Gori	Brothers of Italy	Brothers of Italy	30 September 1980	Replaced Chiara La Porta	
Campania 2 – P01	Stefano Graziano	Democratic Party	Democratic Party – Democratic and Progressive Italy	13 September 1971		
Piemonte 2 – P02	Chiara Gribaudo	Democratic Party	Democratic Party – Democratic and Progressive Italy	16 May 1981		
Piemonte 1 – P01	Marco Grimaldi	Italian Left	Greens and Left Alliance	8 November 1980		
Emilia-Romagna – P02	Naike Gruppioni	Brothers of Italy	Brothers of Italy	25 January 1979	Elected from Action; previously in Italia Viva	
Veneto 1 – P02	Valentina Grippo	Action	Action	7 August 1971		
Campania 2 – P02	Michele Gubitosa	Five Star Movement	Five Star Movement	21 December 1979		
Lombardia 4 – P01	Lorenzo Guerini	Democratic Party	Democratic Party – Democratic and Progressive Italy	21 November 1966		
Piemonte 1 – P01	Maria Cecilia Guerra	Democratic Party	Democratic Party – Democratic and Progressive Italy	6 December 1957	Elected from Art. 1	
Piemonte 2 – U02	Alberto Gusmeroli	League	Lega for Salvini Premier	27 February 1961		
Sicilia 1 – P02	Giovanna Iacono	Democratic Party	Democratic Party – Democratic and Progressive Italy	14 June 1983		
Puglia – U08	Dario Iaia	Brothers of Italy	Brothers of Italy	20 November 1973		
Piemonte 1 – P01	Antonino Iaria	Five Star Movement	Five Star Movement	27 December 1970		
Lombardia 1 – P01	Igor Iezzi	League	Lega for Salvini Premier	18 January 1975		
Lombardia 2 – P02	Sara Kelany	Brothers of Italy	Brothers of Italy	8 June 1978		
Puglia – P03	Patty L'Abbate	Five Star Movement	Five Star Movement	21 December 1979		
Puglia – P02	Marco Lacarra	Democratic Party	Democratic Party – Democratic and Progressive Italy	4 August 1962		
Sardegna – P01	Silvio Lai	Democratic Party	Democratic Party – Democratic and Progressive Italy	20 July 1966		
Sardegna – U02	Gianni Lampis	Brothers of Italy	Brothers of Italy	31 May 1988		
Molise – P01	Elisabetta Christiana Lancellotta	Brothers of Italy	Brothers of Italy	2 March 1979		
Toscana – P01	Chiara La Porta	Brothers of Italy	Brothers of Italy	7 June 1991		
Puglia – P01	Giandonato La Salandra	Brothers of Italy	Brothers of Italy	29 September 1978		
Marche – U02	Giorgia Latini	League	Lega for Salvini Premier	18 April 1980		
Piemonte 1 – P01	Mauro Laus	Democratic Party	Democratic Party – Democratic and Progressive Italy	7 August 1966		
Veneto 2 – P01	Arianna Lazzarini	League	Lega for Salvini Premier	6 March 1976		
Sicilia 2 – P01	Maurizio Leo	Brothers of Italy	Brothers of Italy	25 July 1955		
Calabria – P01	Simona Loizzo	League	Lega for Salvini Premier	20 February 1965		
Lazio 2 – P02	Francesco Lollobrigida	Brothers of Italy	Brothers of Italy	21 March 1972		
Basilicata – P01	Arnaldo Lomuti	Five Star Movement	Five Star Movement	14 February 1975		
Sicilia 2 – P03	Eliana Longi	Brothers of Italy	Brothers of Italy	13 September 1978		
Friuli-Venezia Giulia – P01	Emanuele Loperfido	Brothers of Italy	Brothers of Italy	4 November 1975		
Puglia – P01	Giorgio Lovecchio	Forza Italia	Forza Italia – Berlusconi for President	5 March 1978	Elected from Five Star Movement	
Emilia-Romagna – P01	Ylenja Lucaselli	Brothers of Italy	Brothers of Italy	22 April 1976		
Lombardia 2 – U05	Maurizio Lupi	Us Moderates	Us Moderates–Associative Movement of Italians Abroad–Popular Centre	3 October 1959	Elected from Us with Italy	
Piemonte 1 – U03	Elena Maccanti	League	Lega for Salvini Premier	5 February 1971		
Lombardia 4 – P01	Carlo Maccari	Brothers of Italy	Brothers of Italy	11 May 1965		
Lazio 2 – P01	Marianna Madia	Italia Viva	Italia Viva	5 September 1980	Elected from Democratic Party	
Lombardia 2 – P01	Manuela Maffioli	League	Lega for Salvini Premier	6 June 1971	Replaced Umberto Bossi	
Lombardia 2 – P02	Novo Umberto Maerna	Brothers of Italy	Brothers of Italy	6 September 1956		
Piemonte 1 – U01	Riccardo Magi	More Europe – RI	Mixed Group – More Europe	7 August 1976		
Puglia – P03	Giovanni Maiorano	Brothers of Italy	Brothers of Italy	26 September 1974		
Lombardia 1 – P01	Lorenzo Malagola	Brothers of Italy	Brothers of Italy	10 November 1982		
Emilia-Romagna – U09	Mauro Malaguti	Brothers of Italy	Brothers of Italy	1 March 1960		
Emilia-Romagna – U03	Ilenia Malavasi	Democratic Party	Democratic Party – Democratic and Progressive Italy	22 October 1971		
Lazio 1 – P03	Claudio Mancini	Democratic Party	Democratic Party – Democratic and Progressive Italy	22 February 1969		
Valle d'Aosta – U01	Franco Manes	Valdostan Union	Mixed Group – Linguistic minorities	21 June 1963		
Calabria – P01	Giuseppe Mangialavori	Forza Italia	Forza Italia – Berlusconi for President	11 February 1975		
Lombardia 1 – U03	Lucrezia Mantovani	Brothers of Italy	Brothers of Italy	20 May 1984		
Marche – P01	Irene Manzi	Democratic Party	Democratic Party – Democratic and Progressive Italy	16 August 1977		
Piemonte 2 – P02	Luigi Marattin	Liberal Democratic Party	Mixed Group – N-I	20 February 1979	Elected from Italia Viva; previously independent	
Marche – P01	Riccardo Augusto Marchetti	League	Lega for Salvini Premier	8 May 1987		
Veneto 1 – P01	Marina Marchetto	Brothers of Italy	Brothers of Italy	17 November 1951		
Campania 2 – P02	Francesco Mari	Italian Left	Greens and Left Alliance	4 September 1962		
Sicilia 2 – P01	Maria Stefania Marino	Democratic Party	Democratic Party – Democratic and Progressive Italy	5 January 1969		
Lazio 2 – P02	Patrizia Marrocco	Forza Italia	Forza Italia – Berlusconi for President	21 March 1977		
Lombardia 2 – P01	Andrea Mascaretti	Brothers of Italy	Brothers of Italy	14 April 1965		
Veneto 2 – U07	Ciro Maschio	Brothers of Italy	Brothers of Italy	23 July 1971		
Puglia – U03	Mariangela Matera	Brothers of Italy	Brothers of Italy	3 January 1967		
Lazio 1 – U02	Simonetta Matone	League	Lega for Salvini Premier	16 June 1953		
Friuli-Venezia Giulia – P01	Nicole Matteoni	Brothers of Italy	Brothers of Italy	24 December 1987		
Basilicata – P01	Aldo Mattia	Brothers of Italy	Brothers of Italy	11 January 1956		
Lombardia 1 – P02	Stefano Maullu	Brothers of Italy	Brothers of Italy	15 March 1962		
Lombardia 1 – P02	Matteo Mauri	Democratic Party	Democratic Party – Democratic and Progressive Italy	24 May 1970		
Toscana – U06	Erica Mazzetti	Forza Italia	Forza Italia – Berlusconi for President	31 May 1977		
Veneto 2 – P01	Gianmarco Mazzi	Brothers of Italy	Brothers of Italy	1 July 1960		
Abruzzo – U03	Giorgia Meloni	Brothers of Italy	Brothers of Italy	15 January 1977	FdI leader	
Emilia-Romagna – U06	Virginio Merola	Democratic Party	Democratic Party – Democratic and Progressive Italy	14 February 1955		
Sicilia 2 – P02	Manlio Messina	Independent	Mixed Group – N-I	12 November 1973	Elected from Brothers of Italy	
Toscana – P02	Francesco Michelotti	Brothers of Italy	Brothers of Italy	31 March 1983		
Lazio 2 – P02	Giovanna Miele	League	Lega for Salvini Premier	24 July 1980		
Lazio 2 – P01	Massimo Milani	Brothers of Italy	Brothers of Italy	24 September 1967		
Sicilia 2 – U01	Antonino Minardo	Forza Italia	Forza Italia – Berlusconi for President	5 February 1978	Elected from League; previously in Mixed Group – N-I	
Piemonte 2 – U01	Riccardo Molinari	League	Lega for Salvini Premier	29 July 1983		
Lazio 1 – P01	Federico Mollicone	Brothers of Italy	Brothers of Italy	23 November 1970		
Lombardia 2 – U03	Nicola Molteni	League	Lega for Salvini Premier	6 March 1976		
Piemonte 1 – U02	Augusta Montaruli	Brothers of Italy	Brothers of Italy	14 September 1983		
Toscana – U02	Elisa Montemagni	League	Lega for Salvini Premier	1 June 1986		
Lazio 1 – U04	Roberto Morassut	Democratic Party	Democratic Party – Democratic and Progressive Italy	16 November 1963		
Sicilia 1 – P01	Daniela Morfino	Five Star Movement	Five Star Movement	14 May 1974		
Veneto 2 – P03	Maddalena Morgante	Brothers of Italy	Brothers of Italy	14 June 1981		
Emilia-Romagna – U11	Jacopo Morrone	League	Lega for Salvini Premier	23 January 1983		
Sicilia 1 – P01	Giorgio Mulé	Forza Italia	Forza Italia – Berlusconi for President	25 April 1968		
Sardegna – P01	Francesco Mura	Brothers of Italy	Brothers of Italy	20 September 1983		
Umbria – U01	Raffaele Nevi	Forza Italia	Forza Italia – Berlusconi for President	9 March 1973		
Toscana – U09	Tiziana Nisini	League	Lega for Salvini Premier	18 October 1975		
Veneto 1 – U03	Carlo Nordio	Brothers of Italy	Brothers of Italy	6 February 1947		
Estero – Europa	Federica Onori	Action	Action	16 June 1988	Elected from Five Star Movement	
Lazio 2 – P02	Matteo Orfini	Democratic Party	Democratic Party – Democratic and Progressive Italy	30 August 1974		
Calabria – P01	Anna Laura Orrico	Five Star Movement	Five Star Movement	29 December 1980	Replaced Elisa Scutellà; previously served in U02	
Lombardia 4 – P01	Andrea Orsini	Forza Italia	Forza Italia – Berlusconi for President	23 September 1959		
Lombardia 1 – U06	Marco Osnato	Brothers of Italy	Brothers of Italy	20 March 1972		
Lazio 2 – U05	Nicola Ottaviani	League	Lega for Salvini Premier	21 July 1968		
Veneto 2 – P03	Marco Padovani	Brothers of Italy	Brothers of Italy	25 March 1959		
Abruzzo – P01	Nazario Pagano	Forza Italia	Forza Italia – Berlusconi for President	23 May 1957		
Lazio 1 – U09	Alessandro Palombi	Brothers of Italy	Brothers of Italy	7 July 1976		
Liguria – P01	Alberto Pandolfo	Democratic Party	Democratic Party – Democratic and Progressive Italy	29 November 1985	Replaced Andrea Orlando	
Friuli-Venezia Giulia – U03	Massimiliano Panizzut	League	Lega for Salvini Premier	10 December 1968		
Lombardia 1 – P01	Giulia Pastorella	Action	Action	5 June 1986		
Liguria – U03	Luca Pastorino	Democratic Party	Mixed Group – More Europe	30 September 1971	Elected from èViva	
Campania 1 – P02	Annarita Patriarca	Forza Italia	Forza Italia – Berlusconi for President	27 July 1971		
Umbria – P01	Emma Pavanelli	Five Star Movement	Five Star Movement	19 March 1973		
Piemonte 1 – U05	Roberto Pella	Forza Italia	Forza Italia – Berlusconi for President	6 March 1970		
Puglia – U01	Marco Pellegrini	Five Star Movement	Five Star Movement	30 July 1964		
Lombardia 2 – U01	Andrea Pellicini	Brothers of Italy	Brothers of Italy	28 January 1970		
Lombardia 3 – P01	Vinicio Peluffo	Democratic Party	Democratic Party – Democratic and Progressive Italy	21 March 1971		
Campania 1 – U04	Pasqualino Penza	Five Star Movement	Five Star Movement	16 January 1986		
Sardegna – P01	Mario Perantoni	Five Star Movement	Five Star Movement	6 March 1964	Replaced Emiliano Fenu	
Piemonte 1 – P01	Marco Perissa	Brothers of Italy	Brothers of Italy	22 May 1982		
Puglia – P04	Elisabetta Piccolotti	Italian Left	Greens and Left Alliance	10 February 1982		
Piemonte 1 – P02	Gilberto Pichetto Fratin	Forza Italia	Forza Italia – Berlusconi for President	4 January 1954		
Campania 2 – U07	Attilio Pierro	National Future	Mixed Group – National Future	10 November 1974	Elected from League; previously in Forza Italia	
Lombardia 1 – P02	Fabio Pietrella	Brothers of Italy	Brothers of Italy	11 April 1977		
Sicilia 1 – U05	Calogero Pisano	Brothers of Italy	Brothers of Italy	20 June 1981	Previously in NM–MAIE–CP	
Sardegna – P01	Pietro Pittalis	Forza Italia	Forza Italia – Berlusconi for President	30 April 1958		
Friuli-Venezia Giulia – P01	Graziano Pizzimenti	League	Lega for Salvini Premier	7 May 1961		
Umbria – P01	Catia Polidori	Forza Italia	Forza Italia – Berlusconi for President	3 July 1967		
Sardegna – U03	Barbara Polo	Brothers of Italy	Brothers of Italy	4 February 1973		
Estero – South America	Fabio Porta	Democratic Party	Democratic Party – Democratic and Progressive Italy	5 November 1963		
Piemonte 2 – P01	Emanuele Pozzolo	National Future	Mixed Group – National Future	25 August 1985	Expelled from Brothers of Italy; previously independent	
Lazio 1 – P01	Patrizia Prestipino	Democratic Party	Democratic Party – Democratic and Progressive Italy	16 September 1963	Replaced Nicola Zingaretti; previously served 2018–2022	
Veneto 2 – P02	Erik Umberto Pretto	Forza Italia	Forza Italia – Berlusconi for President	24 December 1984	Elected from League	
Umbria – P01	Emanuele Prisco	Brothers of Italy	Brothers of Italy	23 November 1977		
Sicilia 1 – P01	Peppe Provenzano	Democratic Party	Democratic Party – Democratic and Progressive Italy	23 July 1982		
Lazio 2 – P02	Paolo Pulciani	Brothers of Italy	Brothers of Italy	3 February 1972		
Lombardia 1 – P01	Lia Quartapelle	Democratic Party	Democratic Party – Democratic and Progressive Italy	15 August 1982		
Toscana – P03	Andrea Quartini	Five Star Movement	Five Star Movement	21 March 1960		
Sicilia 2 – P01	Angela Raffa	Five Star Movement	Five Star Movement	26 January 1993		
Lombardia 4 – U02	Carmine Fabio Raimondo	Brothers of Italy	Brothers of Italy	9 November 1978		
Lazio 1 – U03	Fabio Rampelli	Brothers of Italy	Brothers of Italy	2 August 1960		
Lombardia 1 – U05	Laura Ravetto	National Future	Mixed Group – National Future	25 January 1971	Elected from League	
Campania 1 – P01	Marianna Ricciardi	Five Star Movement	Five Star Movement	13 January 1994		
Toscana – P02	Riccardo Ricciardi	Five Star Movement	Five Star Movement	8 May 1982		
Estero – Europa	Toni Ricciardi	Democratic Party	Democratic Party – Democratic and Progressive Italy	20 December 1977		
Emilia-Romagna – P01	Matteo Richetti	Action	Action	3 August 1974		
Liguria – U01	Edoardo Rixi	League	Lega for Salvini Premier	8 June 1974		
Friuli-Venezia Giulia – U02	Walter Rizzetto	Brothers of Italy	Brothers of Italy	27 June 1975		
Calabria – P01	Eugenia Roccella	Brothers of Italy	Brothers of Italy	15 November 1953		
Lombardia 1 – P02	Silvia Roggiani	Democratic Party	Democratic Party – Democratic and Progressive Italy	25 April 1984		
Sicilia 1 – U03	Francesco Saverio Romano	CP-Us Moderates	Us Moderates–Associative Movement of Italians Abroad–Popular Centre	24 December 1964	Elected from Us with Italy	
Veneto 2 – P01	Nadia Romeo	Democratic Party	Democratic Party – Democratic and Progressive Italy	23 June 1971	Replaced Alessandro Zan	
Campania 1 – P02	Ettore Rosato	Action	Action	28 July 1968	Elected from Italia Viva	
Abruzzo – P01	Fabio Roscani	Brothers of Italy	Brothers of Italy	3 June 1990		
Lombardia 1 – U08	Cristina Rossello	Forza Italia	Forza Italia – Berlusconi for President	24 December 1961		
Emilia-Romagna – P01	Andrea Rossi	Democratic Party	Democratic Party – Democratic and Progressive Italy	9 October 1976		
Lazio 1 – P03	Angelo Rossi	Brothers of Italy	Brothers of Italy	23 February 1976		
Toscana – U01	Fabrizio Rossi	Brothers of Italy	Brothers of Italy	2 March 1975		
Liguria – P01	Matteo Rosso	Brothers of Italy	Brothers of Italy	25 June 1967		
Lazio 2 – U01	Mauro Rotelli	Brothers of Italy	Brothers of Italy	2 April 1971		
Campania 2 – U04	Gianfranco Rotondi	Christian Democracy with Rotondi	Brothers of Italy	25 July 1960	Elected from Green is Popular	
Campania 2 – U03	Francesco Maria Rubano	Forza Italia	Forza Italia – Berlusconi for President	21 January 1988		
Piemonte 1 – P01	Daniela Ruffino	Action	Action	7 February 1959		
Lazio 2 – U04	Massimo Ruspandini	Brothers of Italy	Brothers of Italy	20 June 1973		
Emilia-Romagna – P01	Gaetana Russo	Brothers of Italy	Brothers of Italy	25 April 1981		
Sicilia 2 – P02	Paolo Emilio Russo	Forza Italia	Forza Italia – Berlusconi for President	6 June 1977		
Emilia-Romagna – U10	Gloria Saccani Jotti	Forza Italia	Forza Italia – Berlusconi for President	24 October 1956		
Lombardia 1 – P02	Fabrizio Sala	Forza Italia	Forza Italia – Berlusconi for President	13 June 1971		
Campania 2 – P01	Agostino Santillo	Five Star Movement	Five Star Movement	28 October 1974		
Campania 1 – P02	Marco Sarracino	Democratic Party	Democratic Party – Democratic and Progressive Italy	21 June 1989		
Puglia – U06	Rossano Sasso	National Future	Mixed Group – National Future	18 June 1975	Elected from League	
Lombardia 3 – P02	Luca Sbardella	Brothers of Italy	Brothers of Italy	26 September 1973		
Veneto 1 – P01	Rachele Scarpa	Democratic Party	Democratic Party – Democratic and Progressive Italy	29 January 1997		
Sicilia 2 – P03	Filippo Scerra	Five Star Movement	Five Star Movement	25 March 1978		
Campania 1 – P01	Michele Schiano	Brothers of Italy	Brothers of Italy	26 February 1962		
Campania 1 – P02	Marta Schifone	Brothers of Italy	Brothers of Italy	9 October 1980		
Emilia-Romagna – P02	Elly Schlein	Democratic Party	Democratic Party – Democratic and Progressive Italy	24 May 1985	PD leader; elected from Green Italia – ERC	
Trentino-Alto Adige – U03	Manfred Schullian	SVP	Mixed Group – Linguistic minorities	9 March 1962		
Toscana – P03	Arturo Scotto	Democratic Party	Democratic Party – Democratic and Progressive Italy	15 May 1978	Elected from Art. 1	
Veneto 1 – U01	Martina Semenzato	Coraggio Italia	Us Moderates–Associative Movement of Italians Abroad–Popular Centre	9 July 1973		
Friuli-Venezia Giulia – P01	Debora Serracchiani	Democratic Party	Democratic Party – Democratic and Progressive Italy	10 November 1970		
Lazio 1 – P03	Francesco Silvestri	Five Star Movement	Five Star Movement	8 April 1981		
Abruzzo – P01	Rachele Silvestri	Brothers of Italy	Brothers of Italy	30 August 1986		
Toscana – P02	Marco Simiani	Democratic Party	Democratic Party – Democratic and Progressive Italy	25 April 1970		
Piemonte 2 – P02	Matilde Siracusano	Forza Italia	Forza Italia – Berlusconi for President	26 April 1985		
Lombardia 3 – U01	Alessandro Sorte	Forza Italia	Forza Italia – Berlusconi for President	19 February 1984		
Abruzzo – P01	Giulio Cesare Sottanelli	Action	Action	10 April 1970		
Emilia-Romagna – P02	Aboubakar Soumahoro	Italia Plurale	Mixed Group – N-I	6 June 1980	Elected from Green Europe	
Campania 1 – P01	Roberto Speranza	Democratic Party	Democratic Party – Democratic and Progressive Italy	4 January 1979	Elected from Art. 1	
Campania 1 – P01	Gilda Sportiello	Five Star Movement	Five Star Movement	19 February 1987		
Lombardia 3 – P02	Luca Squeri	Forza Italia	Forza Italia – Berlusconi for President	18 December 1961		
Puglia – P04	Claudio Stefanazzi	Democratic Party	Democratic Party – Democratic and Progressive Italy	8 May 1970		
Trentino-Alto Adige – P01	Dieter Steger	SVP	Mixed Group – Linguistic minorities	24 June 1964		
Calabria – P01	Nico Stumpo	Democratic Party	Democratic Party – Democratic and Progressive Italy	20 August 1969	Elected from Art. 1	
Sicilia 2 – U02	Valeria Sudano	League	Lega for Salvini Premier	26 September 1975		
Lombardia 1 – U07	Bruno Tabacci	Democratic Centre	Mixed Group – N-I	27 August 1946	Previously in PD–IDP	
Lazio 1 – U08	Antonio Tajani	Forza Italia	Forza Italia – Berlusconi for President	4 August 1953		
Emilia-Romagna – P03	Rosaria Tassinari	Forza Italia	Forza Italia – Berlusconi for President	18 August 1967		
Toscana – U05	Chiara Tenerini	Forza Italia	Forza Italia – Berlusconi for President	8 December 1972		
Abruzzo – U02	Guerino Testa	Brothers of Italy	Brothers of Italy	16 March 1970		
Estero – South America	Franco Tirelli	MAIE-Us Moderates	Us Moderates–Associative Movement of Italians Abroad–Popular Centre	10 October 1965		
Lombardia 4 – P01	Luca Toccalini	League	Lega for Salvini Premier	18 May 1990		
Abruzzo – P01	Daniela Torto	Five Star Movement	Five Star Movement	18 August 1985		
Lazio 2 – U02	Paolo Trancassini	Brothers of Italy	Brothers of Italy	29 June 1963		
Liguria – P01	Roberto Traversi	Brothers of Italy	Brothers of Italy	1 December 1969	Elected from Five Star Movement	
Lombardia 3 – P01	Andrea Tremaglia	Brothers of Italy	Brothers of Italy	25 September 1987		
Lombardia 1 – P02	Giulio Tremonti	Brothers of Italy	Brothers of Italy	18 August 1947		
Calabria – P01	Riccardo Tucci	Five Star Movement	Five Star Movement	8 May 1986		
Veneto 2 – P02	Alessandro Urzì	Brothers of Italy	Brothers of Italy	7 May 1966		
Emilia-Romagna – P02	Stefano Vaccari	Democratic Party	Democratic Party – Democratic and Progressive Italy	10 April 1967		
Sicilia 1 – U02	Carolina Varchi	Brothers of Italy	Brothers of Italy	14 October 1983		
Campania 2 – U05	Imma Vietri	Brothers of Italy	Brothers of Italy	12 October 1969		
Puglia – P03	Francesca Viggiano	Democratic Party	Democratic Party – Democratic and Progressive Italy	25 March 1981	Replaced Ubaldo Pagano	
Emilia-Romagna – P02	Gianluca Vinci	Brothers of Italy	Brothers of Italy	28 May 1980		
Lazio 1 – P02	Andrea Volpi	Brothers of Italy	Brothers of Italy	28 April 1981		
Veneto 2 – P02	Luana Zanella	Green Europe	Greens and Left Alliance	4 October 1950		
Lazio 1 – P01	Filiberto Zaratti	Green Europe	Greens and Left Alliance	26 March 1956		
Toscana – U04	Edoardo Ziello	National Future	Mixed Group – National Future	11 April 1992	Elected from League	
Campania 2 – P01	Gianpiero Zinzi	League	Lega for Salvini Premier	15 January 1983		
Lombardia 2 – P02	Eugenio Zoffili	League	Lega for Salvini Premier	25 October 1979		
Toscana – U03	Riccardo Zucconi	Brothers of Italy	Brothers of Italy	26 September 1956		
Piemonte 1 – P02	Immacolata Zurzolo	Brothers of Italy	Brothers of Italy	7 June 1973		

== Former members ==
Constituency	Deputy	Party	Group	Birth date	Date	Reason	Replacement	Ref.
Lombardia 2 – P01	Alessandra Todde	Five Star Movement	Five Star Movement	6 February 1969	9 April 2024	Resigned; serving as president of Sardinia	Antonio Ferrara	
Veneto 2 – P03	Flavio Tosi	Forza Italia	Forza Italia – Berlusconi for President	18 June 1969	9 July 2024	Resigned; elected MEP for North-East Italy	Paola Boscaini	
Veneto 2 – P01	Alessandro Zan	Democratic Party	Democratic Party – Democratic and Progressive Italy	4 October 1973	9 July 2024	Resigned; elected MEP for North-East Italy	Patrizia Prestipino	
Lazio 1 – P01	Nicola Zingaretti	Democratic Party	Democratic Party – Democratic and Progressive Italy	11 October 1965	9 July 2024	Resigned; elected MEP for Central Italy	Nadia Romeo	
Puglia – P04	Raffaele Fitto	Brothers of Italy	Brothers of Italy	28 August 1969	2 December 2024	Resigned to serve as European Commission co-executive vice-president	Antonio Maria Gabellone	
Veneto 2 – P02	Enrico Letta	Democratic Party	Democratic Party – Democratic and Progressive Italy	20 August 1966	20 December 2024	Resigned	Rosanna Filippin	
Liguria – P01	Andrea Orlando	Democratic Party	Democratic Party – Democratic and Progressive Italy	8 February 1969	7 January 2025	Resigned to serve as Regional Council of Liguria member	Alberto Pandolfo	
Calabria – U02	Anna Laura Orrico	Five Star Movement	Five Star Movement	29 December 1980	12 March 2025	Annulled election	Andrea Gentile (Forza Italia)	
Calabria – P01	Elisa Scutellà	Five Star Movement	Five Star Movement	31 October 1987	12 March 2025	Annulled election	Anna Laura Orrico	
Sardegna – P01	Emiliano Fenu	Five Star Movement	Five Star Movement	29 January 1977	22 July 2025	Resigned; mayor of Nuoro	Mario Perantoni	
Toscana – P01	Chiara La Porta	Brothers of Italy	Brothers of Italy	7 June 1991	3 December 2025	Resigned to serve as Regional Council of Tuscany member	Irene Gori	
Veneto 2 – U01	Alberto Stefani	League	Lega for Salvini Premier	16 November 1992	9 December 2025	Resigned; serving as president of Veneto	Alberto Di Rubba	
Veneto 2 – U02	Massimo Bitonci	League	Lega for Salvini Premier	24 June 1965	28 December 2025	Resigned; already minister in Stefani government	Giulio Centenaro	
Puglia – P03	Ubaldo Pagano	Democratic Party	Democratic Party – Democratic and Progressive Italy	15 May 1979	2 February 2026	Resigned to take office as Regional Council of Apulia member	Francesca Viggiano	
Lombardia 2 – P01	Umberto Bossi	League	Lega for Salvini Premier	19 September 1941	19 March 2026	Died	Manuela Maffioli	

== See also ==
- Chamber of Deputies (Italy)
- Legislature XIX of Italy
- List of members of the Senate of Italy, 2022–present
