= Trump whisperer =

Slang term in politics

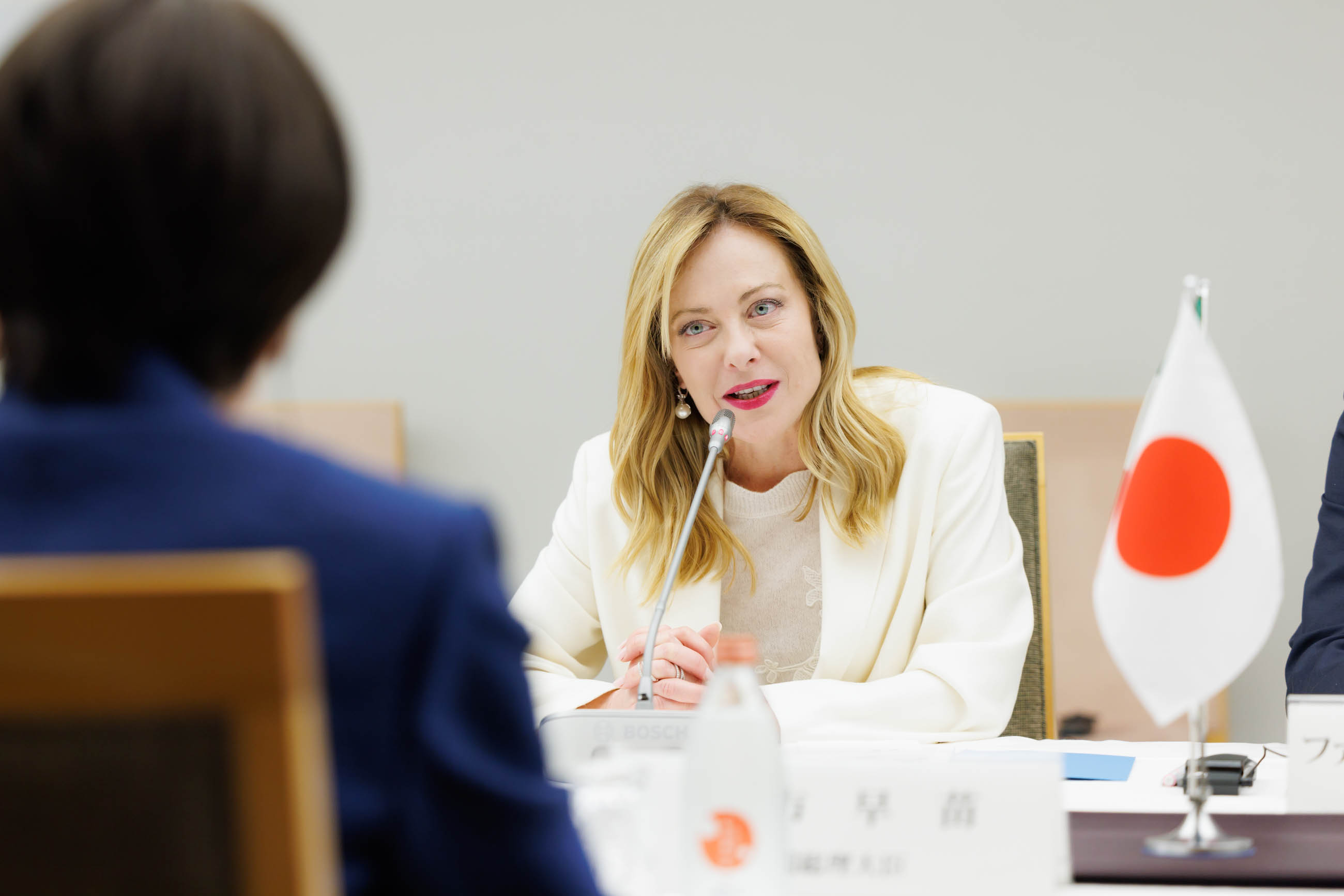
Italian prime minister Giorgia Meloni

Trump whisperer is a term used by European political commentators to describe a politician who is allegedly able to influence the foreign policy of American president Donald Trump towards moderation.

== Overview ==
=== Definition ===
According to Hannah Roberts of The Observer, since Trump's victory in the 2024 United States presidential election, "European capitals have been casting around for a “Trump-whisperer” – someone capable of mediating between an unpredictable White House and an increasingly anxious Europe."

Characteristics described by commentators as part of Trump whispering include: a sense of affable and upbeat charisma, creating a personal rapport with Trump, charm offensives and flattering Trump personally, stating European viewpoints in simple and straightforward terms while also presenting them as symbiotic with the viewpoints of the Trump administration, refraining from direct criticism of the Trump administration's policies, and appearing to be a strong leader domestically. Philippe Dickinson of the Atlantic Council has argued that Trump "kind of respects leaders who are able to sort of communicate on a personal and human level, and who are able to sort of get his instincts and where he’s coming from," adding that "to have somebody who looks the part but is also smart in figuring out how to be deferential to President Trump in the right way is a big part of [Rutte's] success." Stacy Meichtry and Max Colchester of The Wall Street Journal have written that it "starts by understanding his transactional instincts," saying that one tactic politicians have used is to frame geopolitical arguments using real estate terms (using Trump's past as a real estate tycoon), and that another is to invite Trump to elaborate state ceremonies such as a military parades.

=== Examples ===
Prime Minister of the United Kingdom and centrist Labour Party leader Keir Starmer has been named by some commentators as a Trump whisperer. David Maddox of The Independent wrote in December 2025 that foreign policy, and Trump whispering in particular, was "the one area [Starmer] had appeared to excel in as prime minister." Mark Paul of The Irish Times wrote in March 2025 that Starmer's reputation as a Trump whisperer began with a personal phone call Starmer made to Trump following the attempted assassination of Donald Trump in Pennsylvania in July 2024, saying that "Trump was struck by Starmer’s kindness towards him, setting the tone for a political relationship that has stayed warm since, even as glacial winds have buffeted the traditional US-Europe transatlantic alliance." Janan Ganesh of The Financial Times wrote in April 2025 that, of all European countries, "it is Britain that has put the most hope into Trump-whispering. Not just its elected politicians, either. The diplomatic and security services are made up of conscientious people, but their attachment to the American relationship has to be witnessed up close to be believed. The more the country declines, the more its permanent state cherishes its privileged link to Washington — through the Five Eyes intelligence club, for example — as an ego balm. There are almost no circumstances in which “get close to the US president of the day” isn’t the institutional wisdom."

Prime Minister of Italy and leader of the far-right Brothers of Italy Giorgia Meloni has also been named a Trump whisperer by some commentators. Italian journalist Giovanni Legorano wrote in April 2025 that Meloni "has carefully positioned herself as the closest mainstream European leader to Trump," avoiding direct criticism of Trump's foreign policy and trying to balance her similarities in domestic policy with her desire to play a leading role in European politics. British columinist Nicholas Burgess Farrell of The Spectator wrote in June 2025 that Meloni was able to position herself as Europe's leading go-between with Trump due to French president Emmanuel Macron's Lame-duck presidency and German chancellor Friedrich Merz's uneasy grand coalition government, adding that "crucially, she believes that Italy and Europe must stay close to America regardless of whether the Democrats or Republicans are in power." Hannah Roberts of The Observer wrote in January 2026 that Meloni "has emerged as Trump’s self-appointed spin doctor in Europe, echoing his warnings about hostile actors in the Arctic, downplaying Trump’s aggression and behind closed doors urging her fellow European leaders to turn the other cheek. On Friday, she even said she hoped to “finally” be able to nominate him for the Nobel peace prize."

Secretary General of NATO and former centre-right Prime Minister of the Netherlands Mark Rutte has also been named by some commentators as a Trump whisperer. Henry Foy of The Financial Times wrote that Trump's apparent de-escalation of the Greenland Crisis during the 56th World Economic Forum was "classic Rutte: a compromise built on personal connection and a laser focus on finding an outcome — lubricated by lavish praise for Trump that has often bordered on sycophancy." Filip Timotija of The Hill wrote that Rutte "earned the nickname even before becoming the head of NATO, due in part to the rapport he built with the U.S. commander in chief during his first White House stint," adding that "Rutte has invariably praised the president and framed Trump’s priorities as being shared by the military alliance."

== Debates ==
Supporters of Trump whispering have argued that it is a pragmatic necessity. Italian deputy Andrea Di Giuseppe has argued that the United States is "the most important economic and geopolitical power in the world, and must be respected."

Critics of the term have argued that the approach does not actually have the effect of moderating Trump's foreign policies. Such criticism has focused on the Trump administration's hosility towards Europe. Raffaele Marchetti of Luiss University argued that it was "difficult to see how much impact [Meloni] can really have... On various dossiers, the US administration seems to hold very negative views about Europe." Other critics have argued that Trump is too unpredictable for the approach to work consistently. One anonymous European diplomat quoted by Politico Europe stated that "nothing is working. And what works one day might not work the next day."

Critics have also argued that the approach is misguided, and that European leaders should be seeking to build up a stronger, more independent European foreign policy line instead of trying to keep Europe close to the United States. Charles Grant of the Centre for European Reform argued that it "can seem vainglorious. It can also be a mistake. Starmer has done reasonably well at it, but not if it ends up lapsing into something where Britain pretends to have this unique relationship with the Americans, because it thinks Europeans are too stupid to understand them properly." Former Secretary General of NATO and former Danish Prime Minister Anders Fogh Rasmussen argued in January 2026 that "The time for flattering is over. It doesn’t work. The fact is Trump only respects force and strength. And unity. That’s exactly what Europe should demonstrate right now."

Other critics have noted that the approach could have negative repercussions on a politician's domestic popularity. Tim Bale of Queen Mary University of London noted of Starmer's approach that "there’s only so much he can play that bridging/whispering role before he begins to look too close to a President that most Brits regard as either completely crazy or downright dangerous – or both," adding that "voters care far more about domestic than foreign policy performance – wars excepted and, mercifully, we’re not quite there yet."

Other critics have compared the approach to appeasement. Governor of California Gavin Newsom argued in January 2026 that "People are rolling over. I should have brought a bunch of kneepads for all the world leaders. It’s just pathetic. The Europeans should decide for themselves what to do, but one thing they can’t do is what they’ve been doing. They've been played. This guy [Trump] is playing folks for fools." Georg Riekeles of the European Policy Centre argued that Trump whispering was "strategically corrosive. In a world of open coercion, appeasement and restraint do not buy stability. They invite further pressure. Trade conflicts, like coercive bargaining and military deterrence, are shaped in large part by escalation dominance – the ability to convince the other side that you are more willing and more capable of sustaining pressure. That dominance does not rest on size and leverage alone, but on unity and determination. On both counts, Europe has recently failed itself."
