= Overseas (Chamber of Deputies constituency) =

- Chamber of Deputies; Electoral constituency
- Electorate: 4,230,854 (2018)

Current constituency
- Created: 2000
- Seats: 8
- Members: PD (4); FdI (1); Lega (1); M5S (1); MAIE (1)

Overseas (Italian: estero) is one of the 29 constituencies (circoscrizioni) represented in the Chamber of Deputies, the lower house of the Italian parliament. With more than 5.8 million registered voters, it is the largest constituency by population, but it currently elects only 8 deputies.

The constituency was established by constitutional law no. 1 of 17 January 2000.

== Members of the Parliament ==
=== Legislature XIX (2022–present) ===
Multi-member districts
District			Party	Deputy
N.	Name	Map	Party	Deputy
01	Europe		Lega	Simone Billi
01	Europe		Five Star Movement	Federica Onori
01	Europe		Democratic Party	Toni Ricciardi
02	South America		Democratic Party	Fabio Porta
02	South America		MAIE	Franco Tirelli
03	North and Central America		FdI	Andrea Di Giuseppe
03	North and Central America		Democratic Party	Christian Diego Di Sanzo
04	Africa, Asia, Oceania and Antarctica		Democratic Party	Nicola Carè

== See also ==
- Overseas constituencies of the Italian Parliament
- Overseas (Senate of the Republic constituency)
