= Paola Boscaini =

Italian politician

Member of the Chamber of Deputies
- Incumbent
- Assumed office 9 July 2024
- Preceded by: Flavio Tosi
- Constituency: Veneto 2

Personal details
- Born: 22 September 1954 (age 72) Bussolengo, Italy
- Party: Forza Italia
- Education: International University of Rome

Maria Paola Boscaini (born 22 September 1954) is an Italian politician. She has been a member of the Chamber of Deputies since 2022.

== Biography ==
She graduated in Business Economics at the Libera Università degli Studi San Pio V in Rome in 2007, she worked for many years in the insurance sector in Verona and Milan.

== Political career ==
In the 2013 municipal elections she was elected mayor of Bussolengo at the head of two civic lists, winning the run-off with 51.45% of the votes against Massimo Girelli's 48.55% for the centre-right coalition, after having obtained 16.45% in the first round. She ran again in 2018, obtaining 33.42% in the first round but being defeated in the run-off (46.09%) by the centrist civic challenger Roberto Brizzi (53.91%), and in 2023, losing again with 25.03% against the outgoing mayor, who was re-elected in the first round. In both cases, she still entered the municipal council as an unelected mayoral candidate.

After joining Forza Italia, on the occasion of the 2022 Italian general election she was a candidate for a seat in the Chamber of Deputies in the Veneto 2 constituency in second place on the list behind Flavio Tosi but was not elected.She entered the Italian Parliament on 9 July 2024, replacing Tosi, who was elected a Member of the European Parliament in the 2024 European Parliament election.

== See also ==
- List of members of the Chamber of Deputies of Italy, 2022–present
