= Antonio Ferrara =

Antonio Ferrara may refer to:

- Antonio Ferrara (criminal), French criminal known for a prison escape
- Antonio Ferrara (footballer), Argentine footballer
- Antonio Ferrara (politician) (born 1970), Italian politician
- Antonio Ferrara, founder of Ferrara Bakery and Cafe in New York City
- José Antonio Ferrara, director of several Venezuelan telenovelas including La mujer de mi vida, Como tú, ninguna, Y la luna también and Por amarte tanto
