= Daniela Dondi =

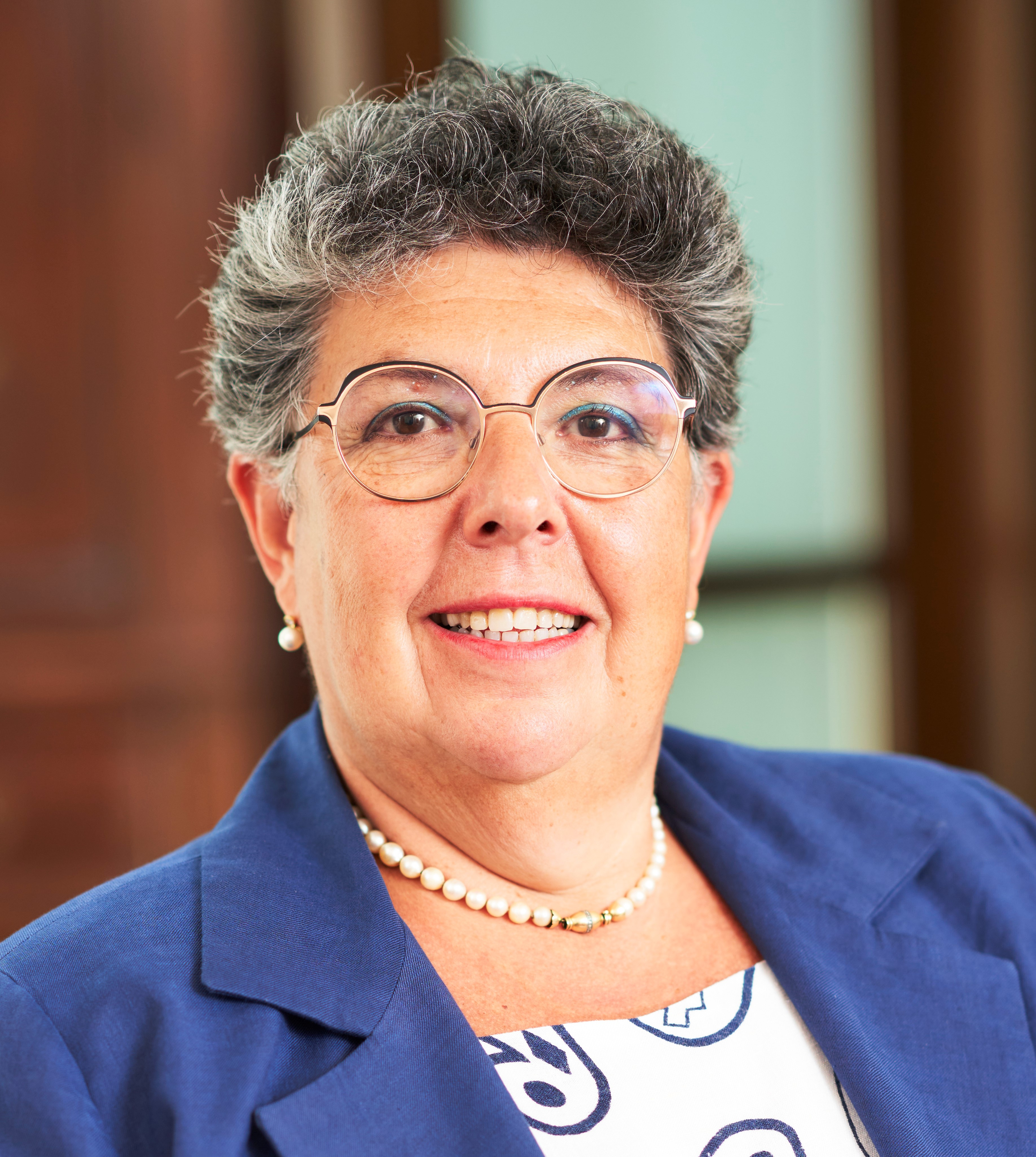
- Daniela Dondi in 2022

Member of the Chamber of Deputies
- Incumbent
- Assumed office 13 October 2022
- Constituency: Emilia-Romagna

Personal details
- Born: 12 January 1962 (age 64) Modena, Italy
- Party: Brothers of Italy
- Education: University of Modena
- Website: www.danieladondi.it

Daniela Dondi (born 12 January 1962) is an Italian politician. She was elected to the Chamber of Deputies of the Italian Parliament in the 2022 Italian general election for the Brothers of Italy.

== Biography ==
Born in Modena, she graduated from the University of Modena on 25 November 1986 with a mark of 96/110. Since 1990 she has been practising law always in the civil field, holding the position of councillor of the Modena Bar Association since 1998 and that of president of the Modena Bar Association since 2015. From 2005 to 2009 she was a representative of the CUP (Unitary Committee of Professions) of the Province of Modena in the Equal Opportunities Commission of the Province of Modena (2005-2009).

== Political career ==
She approached politics with Brothers of Italy in the 2020 Emilia-Romagna regional election, and stood as a candidate for regional councilor for the province of Modena but not being elected with 362 preferences.

In the 2022 Italian general election she was elected to the Chamber of Deputies in the single-member constituency Emilia-Romagna - 04 (Modena) for the centre-right (in the Brothers of Italy quota), obtaining 37.44% and narrowly defeating Aboubakar Soumahoro of the centre-left (36.01%) and Stefania Ascari of the Five Star Movement (11.05%). She supported the constitutional reform proposed by the 2026 Italian referendum.

== See also ==
- List of members of the Chamber of Deputies of Italy, 2022–present
