= Mirco Carloni =

Italian politician (born 1981)

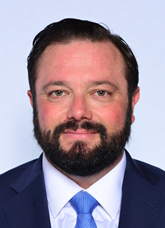
- Carloni in 2022

Member of the Chamber of Deputies
- Incumbent
- Assumed office 13 October 2022
- Constituency: Marche

Vice President of Marche
- In office 15 October 2020 – 19 October 2022
- President: Francesco Acquaroli
- Preceded by: Anna Casini
- Succeeded by: Filippo Saltamartini

Personal details
- Born: 14 January 1981 (age 45)
- Party: Lega (2019–present)
- Other political affiliations: FI (1999–2009); PdL (2009–2013); NCD (2013–2017); AP (2017–2019)

Mirco Carloni (born 14 January 1981) is an Italian politician of Lega who was elected member of the Chamber of Deputies in 2022. He previously served as vice president of Marche and as deputy mayor of Fano. Since 2022, he has chaired the Agriculture Committee.
