= Carmela Auriemma =

Italian politician (born 1981)

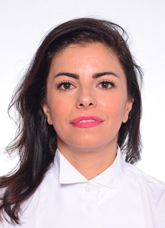

Member of the Chamber of Deputies of Italy
- Incumbent
- Assumed office 13 October 2022

Personal details
- Born: 3 July 1981 (age 45) Maddaloni, Italy
- Party: 5 Star Movement
- Education: University of Naples Federico II
- Profession: lawyer

Carmela Auriemma (born 3 July 1981) is an Italian lawyer and politician from the Five Star Movement. She has been member of the Chamber of Deputies since 13 October 2022.

== Biography ==
Auriemma was born on 3 July 1981 in Maddaloni, in the province of Caserta. She graduated in law with 110 cum laude at the University of Naples Federico II, with a thesis in civil procedural law, then obtaining a master's degree in environmental law and a specialization course in the protection of rights at the Court of Justice of the European Union.

Since 2012 she has been working as a lawyer, specializing in European Union law, registered with the Naples Bar Association and owner of a law firm since 2016.

She was a university lecturer at Link Campus University in 2014.

== Political activities ==
An activist of the 5 Star Movement (M5S), in the 2017 municipal elections in Campania she was a candidate for mayor of Acerra for the M5S, obtaining 7.15% of the votes, which did not allow her to become mayor, but she was elected to the municipal council of Acerra, where she is president of the Supervisory Commission.

In the 2022 Campania municipal elections, she was confirmed as a municipal councillor for the M5S with 698 preferences, resulting in her being the most voted woman and among the most voted.

In the 2022 Italian general election, she was a candidate for the Chamber of Deputies for the 5 Star Movement, both in the single-member constituency Campania 1 - 05 (Acerra) and in the multi-member constituency Campania 1 - 02 in fourth position, being elected deputy in the single-member constituency with 43.69% of the votes and clearly surpassing the candidates of the center-left, in the PD-IDP quota, Paolo Siani (23.61%) and of the center-right, in the Lega quota, Maria Concetta Donnarumma (23.56%). In the XIX legislature, she was vice-president of the Election Committee of the Chamber and member of the 1st Constitutional Affairs, Presidency of the Council and Internal Affairs Commission, in addition to holding the positions of secretary and delegate of the M5S parliamentary group in the Chamber.

== See also ==
- Deputati della XIX legislatura della Repubblica Italiana
- Movimento 5 Stelle
