= Susanna Cherchi =

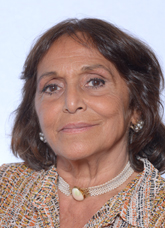

Member of the Chamber of Deputies
- Incumbent
- Assumed office 13 October 2022
- Constituency: Sardinia

Personal details
- Born: 23 December 1955 (age 70) Iglesias, Sardinia, Italy
- Party: Five Star Movement
- Education: Sapienza University of Rome
- Website: www.camera.it/deputati/elenco/19-308858

Susanna Cherchi (born 23 December 1955) is an Italian politician. She has been a member of the Chamber of Deputies for the 5 Star Movement since 13 October 2022.

== Biography ==
Born in Iglesias (Carbonia-Iglesias), she obtained her high school diploma at the Giovanni Battista Morgagni scientific high school in Rome in 1974 and her master 's degree in geological sciences at the Sapienza University of Rome "La Sapienza" in 1983. She then began teaching as a mathematics and science teacher at the lower secondary school, where she is now retired.

=== Political career ===
She began his political career by joining the Five Star Movement (M5S) in 2012, as part of the local party in Olbia and taking on the role of list representative.

In the early political elections of 2022 she was a candidate for the Chamber of Deputies, among the M5S lists in the multi-member constituency Sardinia - 01 in third position, resulting in being elected a deputy. In the XIX legislature she was part of the Committee on Culture, Science and Education (2022–2023), of the Agriculture Committee (2023–) and of the Parliamentary Commission for the fight against disadvantages deriving from Insularity (2025–).

In 2025, she introduced a bill to introduce a new article in the penal code to punish bestiality and zoopornography (dissemination of pornographic material involving animals).

== See also ==
- List of members of the Chamber of Deputies of Italy, 2022–present
- List of members of the Senate of Italy, 2022–present
- Five Star Movement
