= Molise (Chamber of Deputies constituency) =

Italian Chamber of Deputies constituency

- Chamber of Deputies; Electoral constituency
- Region: Molise
- Electorate: 254,108 (2018)
- Major settlements: Campobasso, Isernia

Current constituency
- Created: 1993
- Seats: 2
- Members: UDC (1); FDI (1)

Molise is one of the 29 constituencies (Italian: circoscrizioni) represented in the Chamber of Deputies, the lower house of the Italian parliament. The constituency currently elects 2 deputies, less than any other except Aosta Valley. Its boundaries correspond to those of the Italian region of Molise. The electoral system uses a parallel voting system, which act as a mixed system, with half of seats allocated using a first-past-the-post electoral system and half using a proportional method, with one round of voting.

The constituency was first established by the Mattarella law on 4 August 1993 and later confirmed by the Calderoli law on 21 December 2005 and by the Rosato law on 3 November 2017.

== Members of the Parliament ==
=== 2018–2022 ===
Single-member districts
| District | | | Deputy | Party |
| N. | Name | Map | Deputy | Party |
|---|---|---|---|---|
| 01 | Isernia | | Rosa Alba Testamento | Five Star Movement |
| 02 | Campobasso | | Antonio Federico | Five Star Movement |

Multi-member districts
| District | | | Party | Deputy |
| N. | Name | Map | Party | Deputy |
|---|---|---|---|---|
| 01 | Molise – 01 | | Free and Equal | Giuseppina Occhionero |

=== 2022–present ===
Single-member districts
| District | | | Deputy | Party |
| N. | Name | Map | Deputy | Party |
|---|---|---|---|---|
| 01 | Campobasso | | Lorenzo Cesa | Union of the Centre |

Multi-member districts
| District | | | Party | Deputy |
| N. | Name | Map | Party | Deputy |
|---|---|---|---|---|
| 01 | Molise – 01 | | Brothers of Italy | Elisabetta Christiana Lancellotta |
