= Paola Chiesa =

Italian politician (born 1979)

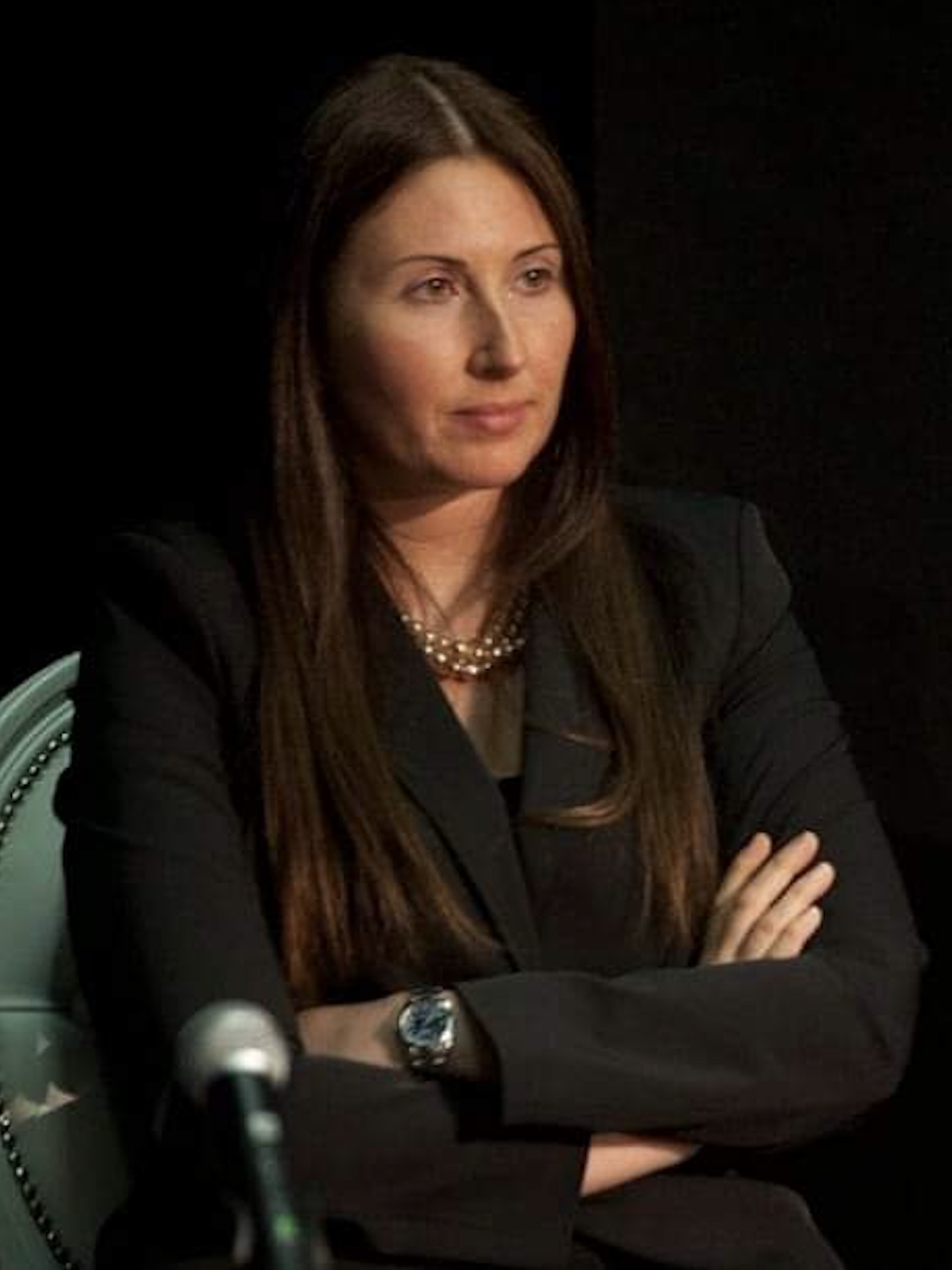

Member of the Chamber of Deputies
- Incumbent
- Assumed office 13 October 2022
- Constituency: Lombardy 4

Personal details
- Born: 12 September 1979 (age 46)
- Party: Brothers of Italy

Paola Maria Chiesa (born 12 September 1979) is an Italian politician of Brothers of Italy who was elected member of the Chamber of Deputies in 2022. She served as group leader of Brothers of Italy in the city council of Pavia until 2023.
