= Andrea Gentile (politician) =

Italian politician (born 1980)

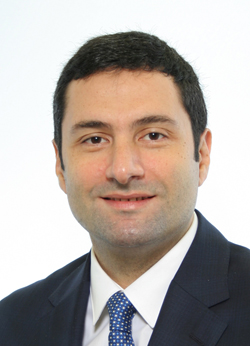
- Gentile in 2021

Member of the Chamber of Deputies
- Incumbent
- Assumed office 12 March 2025
- Preceded by: Anna Laura Orrico
- Constituency: Calabria – U02
- In office 4 October 2021 – 13 October 2022
- Preceded by: Roberto Occhiuto
- Constituency: Calabria – P01

Personal details
- Born: 1 June 1980 (age 46)
- Party: Forza Italia (since 2018)
- Parent: Antonio Gentile (father)
- Relatives: Pino Gentile (uncle)

Andrea Gentile (born 1 June 1980) is an Italian politician. He has been a member of the Chamber of Deputies since 2025, having previously served from 2021 to 2022. He is the son of Antonio Gentile and the nephew of Pino Gentile.
