= Maddalena Morgante =

Italian politician (born 1981)

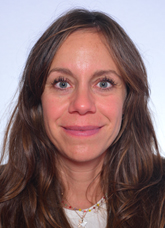
- Morgante in 2022

Member of the Chamber of Deputies
- Incumbent
- Assumed office 13 October 2022
- Constituency: Veneto 2

Personal details
- Born: 14 June 1981 (age 45)
- Party: Brothers of Italy
- Relatives: Valentino Perdonà (grandfather)

Maddalena Morgante (born 14 June 1981), is an Italian politician of Brothers of Italy who was elected member of the Chamber of Deputies in 2022. She is the granddaughter of Valentino Perdonà.

== Biography ==
She is the granddaughter of Valentino Perdonà, a member of the Chamber of Deputies for the Christian Democracy (Italy).

In the 2020 regional elections in Veneto, she ran as a candidate for Brothers of Italy in support of incumbent President Luca Zaia, receiving approximately 3,000 preferential votes but failing to win a seat.

She ran for city council in the Verona municipal elections scheduled for June 2022. With 393 votes, she was the highest-ranking candidate not elected. She took her seat on the council in May 2023, replacing Marco Padovani, but resigned shortly thereafter, in July of that same year.

In the September 2022 general election, she ran for the Chamber of Deputies (Italy) in the Veneto 2 - 03 multi-member district and was elected.

Since August 2023, she has served as the national head of the Family and Non-Negotiable Values Department of Brothers of Italy, having held the same position at the regional level since January 2021.

In May 2024, during the European elections, she ran as a candidate on the Fratelli d'Italia ticket for the North-East Italy (European Parliament constituency). She received 8,703 votes but was not elected.
