= Matteo Rosso =

Italian politician (born 1967)

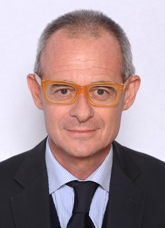
- Rosso in 2022

Member of the Chamber of Deputies
- Incumbent
- Assumed office 13 October 2022
- Constituency: Liguria – 01

Personal details
- Born: 25 June 1967 (age 58)
- Party: Brothers of Italy (since 2012)

Matteo Rosso (born 25 June 1967) is an Italian politician serving as a member of the Chamber of Deputies since 2022. From 2005 to 2020, he was a member of the Regional Council of Liguria.
