= Alfonso Colucci =

Italian politician (born 1964)

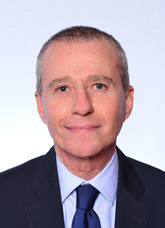
- Colucci in 2022

Member of the Chamber of Deputies
- Incumbent
- Assumed office 13 October 2022
- Constituency: Lazio 1 – P02

Personal details
- Born: 24 February 1964 (age 62)
- Party: Five Star Movement

Alfonso Colucci (born 24 February 1964) is an Italian politician serving as a member of the Chamber of Deputies since 2022. He has served as deputy chairman of the legislation committee since 2026.
