= Marco Grimaldi =

Italian politician (born 1980)

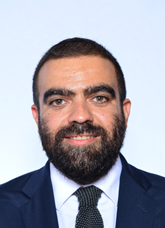
- Grimaldi in 2022

Member of the Chamber of Deputies
- Incumbent
- Assumed office 13 October 2022
- Constituency: Piedmont 1 – P01

Personal details
- Born: 8 November 1980 (age 45)
- Party: Italian Left (since 2017)

Marco Grimaldi (born 8 November 1980) is an Italian politician serving as a member of the Chamber of Deputies since 2022. From 2014 to 2022, he was a member of the Regional Council of Piedmont.

He is a self-proclaimed socialist.
