= Massimo Milani =

Italian politician (born 1967)

Member of the Chamber of Deputies
- Incumbent
- Assumed office 13 October 2022
- Constituency: Lazio 2 – P01

Personal details
- Born: 24 September 1967 (age 58)
- Party: Brothers of Italy

Massimo Milani (born 24 September 1967) is an Italian politician serving as a member of the Chamber of Deputies since 2022. From February to March 2013, he served as assessor for public works of Rome.

== Biography ==
A construction entrepreneur, he served for one month in 2013 as the councilor for public works and the suburbs of Rome in Gianni Alemanno administration.

In the 2022 general election, he was elected to the Chamber of Deputies from the Lazio 2-01 multi-member district as a candidate for Brothers of Italy. Since November 9, 2022, he has served as secretary of the Eighth Committee on the Environment, Territory, and Public Works.
