= Paolo Emilio Russo =

Italian politician (born 1977)

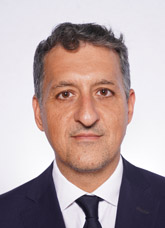
- Russo in 2022

Member of the Chamber of Deputies
- Incumbent
- Assumed office 13 October 2022
- Constituency: Sicily 2 – P02

Personal details
- Born: 6 June 1977 (age 49)
- Party: Forza Italia

Paolo Emilio Russo (born 6 June 1977) is an Italian politician serving as a member of the Chamber of Deputies since 2022. He has served as group leader of Forza Italia in the constitutional affairs committee since 2022.
