= Alberto Pandolfo =

Italian politician (born 1985)

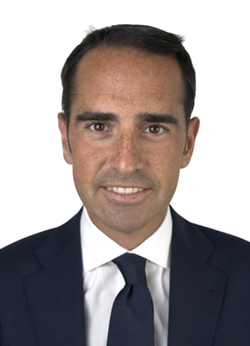
- Pandolfo in 2025

Member of the Chamber of Deputies
- Incumbent
- Assumed office 7 January 2025
- Preceded by: Andrea Orlando
- Constituency: Liguria – P01

Personal details
- Born: 29 November 1985 (age 40)
- Party: Democratic Party (since 2007)

Alberto Pandolfo (born 29 November 1985) is an Italian politician serving as a member of the Chamber of Deputies since 2025. From 2012 to 2025, he was a municipal councillor of Genoa.
