= Maria Grazia Frijia =

Italian politician (born 1974)

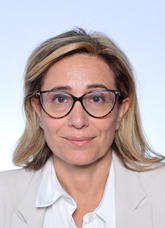
- Frijia in 2022

Member of the Chamber of Deputies
- Incumbent
- Assumed office 13 October 2022
- Constituency: Liguria – P01

Personal details
- Born: 9 August 1974 (age 51)
- Party: Brothers of Italy

Maria Grazia Frijia (born 9 August 1974) is an Italian politician serving as a member of the Chamber of Deputies since 2022. She has served as deputy mayor of La Spezia since 2022.
