= Marco Simiani =

Italian politician

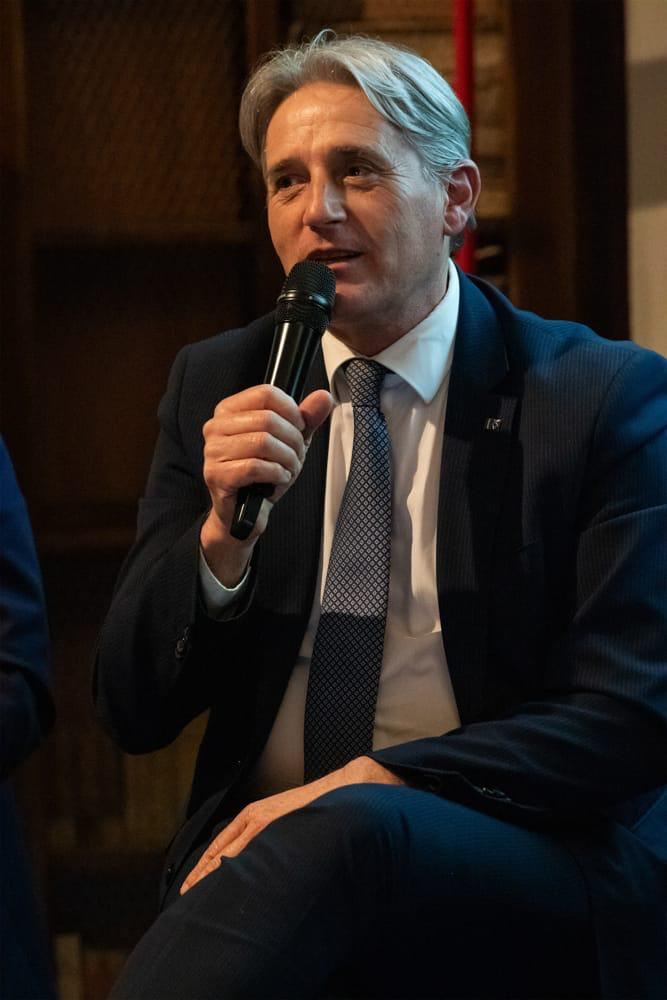

Member of the Chamber of Deputies
- Incumbent
- Assumed office 13 October 2022

Personal details
- Born: 25 April 1970 (age 56) Pisa, Tuscany, Italy
- Party: Democratic Party
- Profession: Entrepreneur

Marco Simiani (born 25 April 1970) is an Italian politician who has served as a Deputy since 13 October 2022.

== Life and career ==
Born in Pisa but raised in Grosseto, he is an entrepreneur in the lighting sector and has served as the vice president of Confesercenti for the province of Grosseto.

He has been politically active with the Democrats of the Left since 1999, before moving to the Democratic Party, for which he served as a member of the provincial board in Grosseto, provincial secretary from 2015, and as a member of the regional secretariat of Tuscany. From August to December 2019, he was the commissioner for the municipal union of the party in Pisa.

In the 2022 general election, he was elected as a deputy in the constituency of Tuscany 2.
