= Rosaria Tassinari =

Italian politician (born 1967)

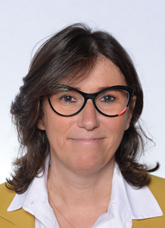
- Tassinari in 2022

Member of the Chamber of Deputies
- Incumbent
- Assumed office 13 October 2022
- Constituency: Emilia-Romagna – P03

Personal details
- Born: 18 August 1967 (age 58)
- Party: Forza Italia (since 2013)

Rosaria Tassinari (born 18 August 1967) is an Italian politician serving as a member of the Chamber of Deputies since 2022. From 2009 to 2019, she served as mayor of Rocca San Casciano.
