= Giovanna Iacono =

Italian politician (born 1983)

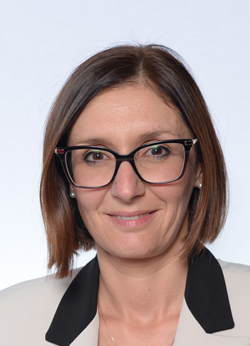
- Iacono official portrait

Member of the Chamber of Deputies
- Incumbent
- Assumed office 13 October 2022
- Constituency: Sicily 1 – 02

Personal details
- Born: 14 June 1983 (age 42)
- Party: Democratic Party

Giovanna Iacono (born 14 June 1983) is an Italian politician serving as a member of the Chamber of Deputies since 2022. She has served as secretary of the Democratic Party in the province of Agrigento since 2021.
