= Emma Pavanelli =

Italian politician (born 1973)

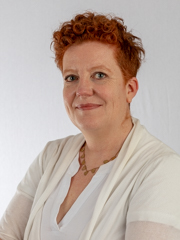
- Pavanelli in 2019

Member of the Chamber of Deputies
- Incumbent
- Assumed office 13 October 2022
- Constituency: Umbria – P01

Member of the Senate
- In office 31 July 2019 – 12 October 2022
- Constituency: Sicily – P02

Personal details
- Born: 19 March 1973 (age 53)
- Party: Five Star Movement

Emma Pavanelli (born 19 March 1973) is an Italian politician serving as a member of the Chamber of Deputies since 2022. From 2019 to 2022, she was a member of the Senate.
