= Eliana Longi =

Italian politician (born 1978)

Member of the Chamber of Deputies
- Incumbent
- Assumed office 13 October 2022
- Constituency: Sicily 2 – 03

Personal details
- Born: 13 September 1978 (age 47)
- Party: Brothers of Italy

Eliana Longi (born 13 September 1978) is an Italian politician serving as a member of the Chamber of Deputies since 2022. Until 2025, she served as coordinator of the Future and Tradition faction of Brothers of Italy.
