= Giorgio Fede =

Italian politician (born 1961)

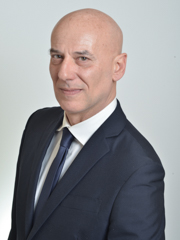
- Fede in 2018

Member of the Chamber of Deputies
- Incumbent
- Assumed office 13 October 2022
- Constituency: Marche – P01

Member of the Senate
- In office 23 March 2018 – 12 October 2022
- Constituency: Marche – U03

Personal details
- Born: 23 December 1961 (age 64)
- Party: Five Star Movement

Giorgio Fede (born 23 December 1961) is an Italian politician serving as a member of the Chamber of Deputies since 2022. From 2018 to 2022, he was a member of the Senate.
