= Andrea Mascaretti =

Italian politician (born 1965)

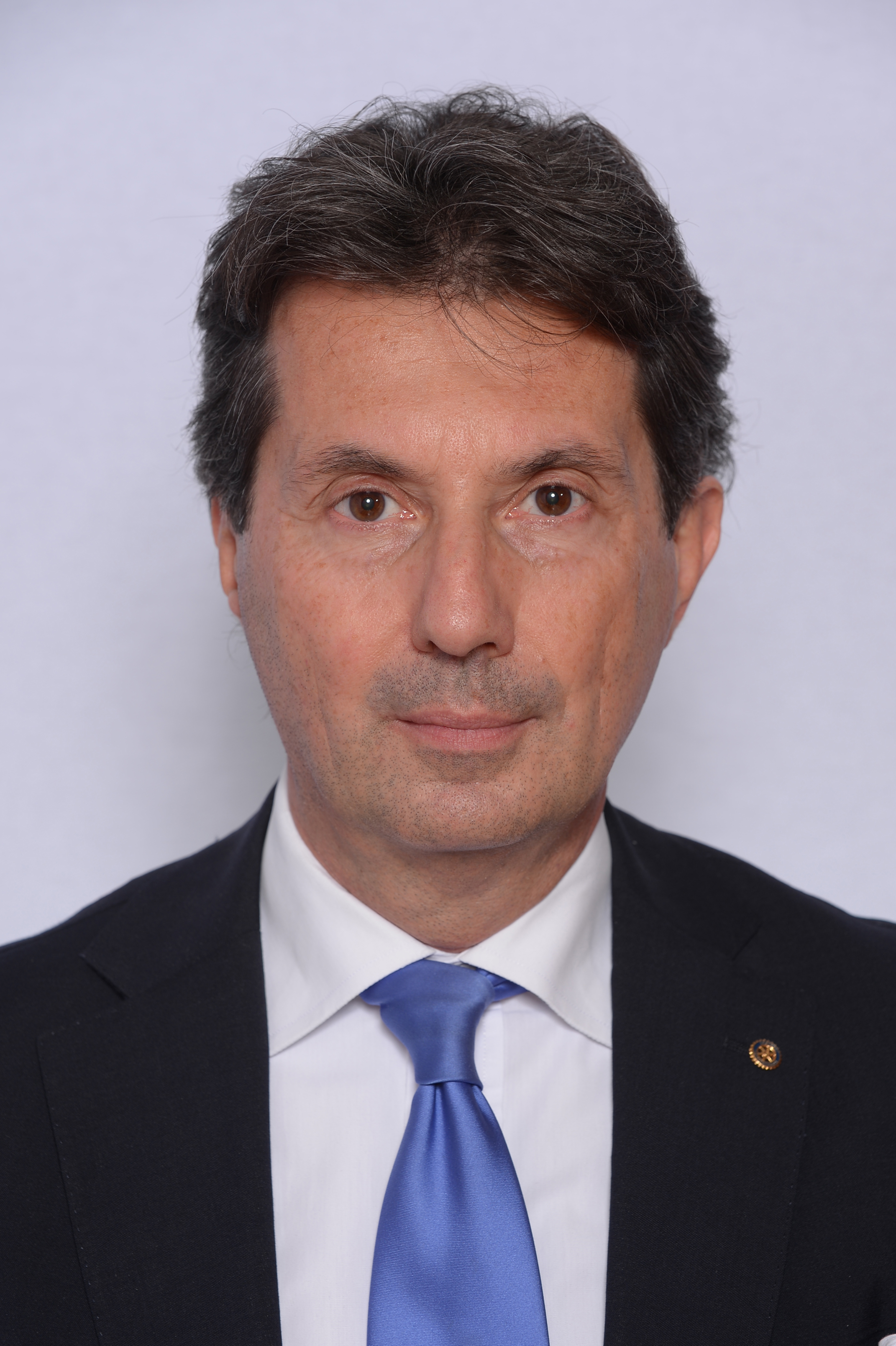
- Mascaretti in 2022

Member of the Chamber of Deputies
- Incumbent
- Assumed office 13 October 2022
- Constituency: Lombardia 2 – P01

Personal details
- Born: 14 April 1965 (age 61)
- Party: Brothers of Italy (since 2019)

Andrea Mascaretti (born 14 April 1965) is an Italian politician serving as a member of the Chamber of Deputies since 2022. From 2021 to 2023, he served as deputy chairman of the City Council of Milan.
