= Francesca Viggiano =

Italian politician (born 1981)

Member of the Chamber of Deputies
- Incumbent
- Assumed office 2 February 2026
- Preceded by: Ubaldo Pagano
- Constituency: Apulia – P03

Personal details
- Born: 25 March 1981 (age 45)
- Party: Democratic Party

Francesca Viggiano (born 25 March 1981) is an Italian politician serving as a member of the Chamber of Deputies since 2026. She was an assessor of Taranto from 2017 to 2021 and from 2022 to 2023.
