= Nicole Matteoni =

Italian politician (born 1987)

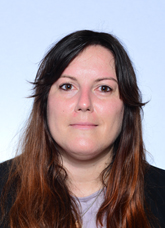
- Matteoni in 2022

Member of the Chamber of Deputies
- Incumbent
- Assumed office 13 October 2022
- Constituency: Friuli-Venezia Giulia

Personal details
- Born: 24 December 1987 (age 38)
- Party: Brothers of Italy (since 2012)

Nicole Matteoni (born 24 December 1987) is an Italian politician serving as a member of the Chamber of Deputies since 2022. From 2021 to 2023, she served as assessor for education and family of Trieste.
