= Manlio Messina =

Italian politician (born 1973)

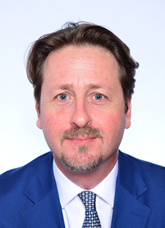
- Messina in 2022

Member of the Chamber of Deputies
- Incumbent
- Assumed office 13 October 2022
- Constituency: Sicily 2 – P02

Personal details
- Born: 12 November 1973 (age 52)
- Party: Independent (since 2025)
- Other political affiliations: Brothers of Italy (2016–2025)

Manlio Messina (born 12 November 1973) is an Italian politician serving as a member of the Chamber of Deputies since 2022. From 2019 to 2022, he served as assessor for tourism, sports and entertainment of Sicily.
