= Lorenzo Malagola =

Italian politician (born 1982)

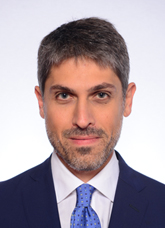
- Malagola in 2022

Member of the Chamber of Deputies
- Incumbent
- Assumed office 13 October 2022
- Constituency: Lombardy 1 – 01

Personal details
- Born: 10 November 1982 (age 43)
- Party: Brothers of Italy (since 2020)

Lorenzo Malagola (born 10 November 1982) is an Italian politician serving as a member of the Chamber of Deputies since 2022. From 2006 to 2011, he was a member of the City Council of Milan.

== Biography ==
After earning a degree in Business Administration from the Università Cattolica del Sacro Cuore in Milan, he began his political career as a Milan city council member for Forza Italia in 2006. In 2008, he moved to Rome, where he served as Chief of Staff to the Minister of Labor, Health, and Social Policies, Maurizio Sacconi. In 2013, he became Chief of Staff to the Deputy Prime Minister, Angelino Alfano.

Since 2014, he has worked as an executive at multinational companies in the private sector and has been actively involved in civic engagement as Secretary General of the Alcide De Gasperi.

In the 2022 general election, he was elected to the Chamber of Deputies from the Lombardy 1 multi-member district as a candidate for Brothers of Italy. Since November 9, 2022, he has served as secretary of the 11th Committee on Public and Private Employment.
