= Fabio Raimondo =

Italian politician (born 1978)

Member of the Chamber of Deputies
- Incumbent
- Assumed office 13 October 2022
- Constituency: Lombardy 4 – 02

Personal details
- Born: 9 November 1978 (age 47)
- Party: Brothers of Italy (since 2012)

Carmine Fabio Raimondo (born 9 November 1978) is an Italian politician serving as a member of the Chamber of Deputies since 2022. From 2019 to 2024, he was an assessor of Cesano Boscone.
