= Giovanni Luca Cannata =

Italian politician (born 1979)

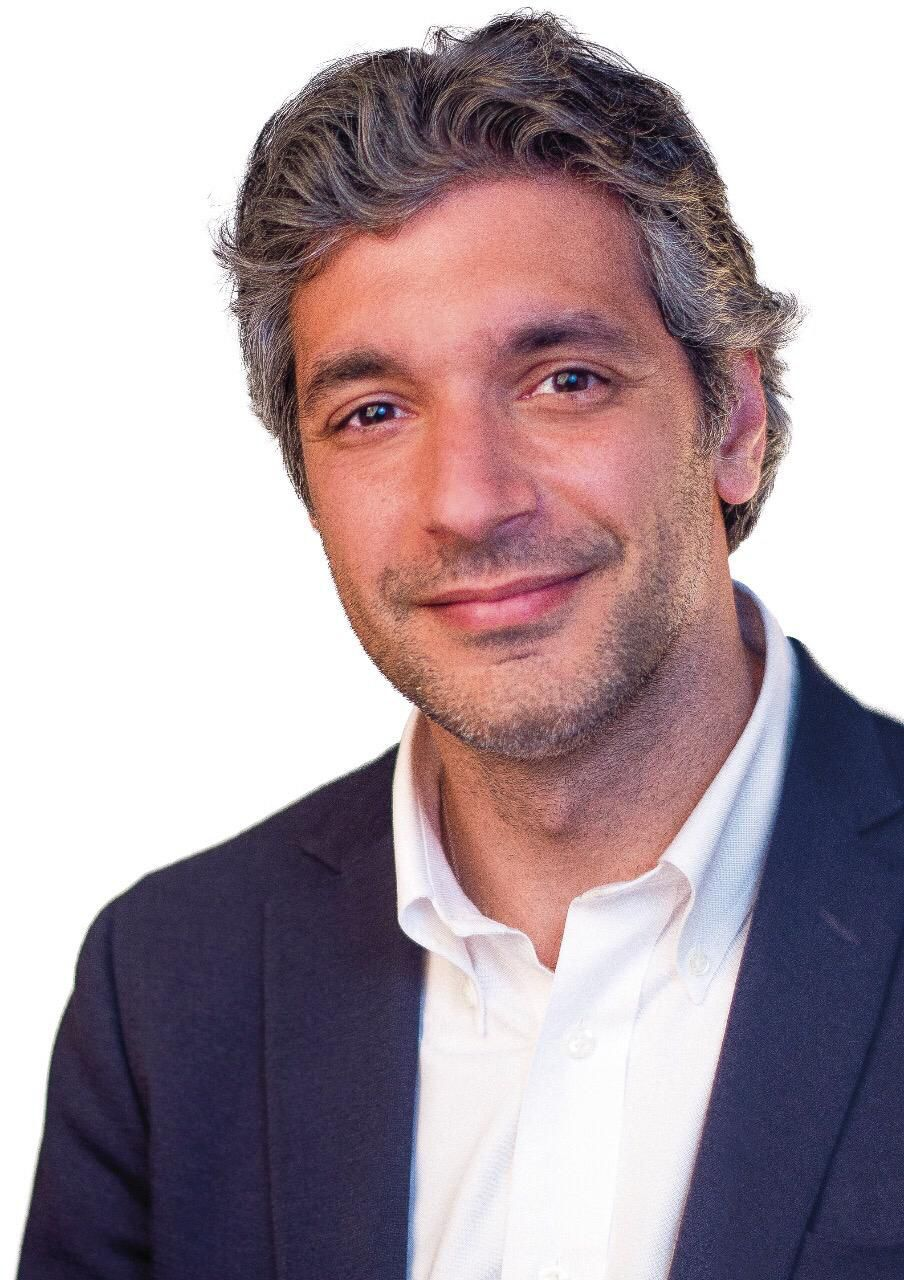
- Cannata in 2022

Member of the Chamber of Deputies
- Incumbent
- Assumed office 13 October 2022
- Constituency: Sicily 2 – 04

Personal details
- Born: 17 May 1979 (age 47)
- Party: Brothers of Italy (since 2019)

Giovanni Luca Cannata (born 17 May 1979) is an Italian politician serving as a member of the Chamber of Deputies since 2022. From 2012 to 2022, he served as mayor of Avola. From 2022 to 2023, he was a member of the Sicilian Regional Assembly.
