= Marcello Coppo =

Italian politician (born 1978)

Member of the Chamber of Deputies
- Incumbent
- Assumed office 13 October 2022
- Constituency: Piedmont 2 – 04

Personal details
- Born: 27 November 1978 (age 47)
- Party: Brothers of Italy

Marcello Coppo (born 27 November 1978) is an Italian politician serving as a member of the Chamber of Deputies since 2022. From 2017 to 2022, he served as deputy mayor of Asti.
