= Antonella Forattini =

Italian politician (born 1966)

Member of the Chamber of Deputies
- Incumbent
- Assumed office 13 October 2022
- Constituency: Lombardy 4 – P01

Personal details
- Born: 13 May 1966 (age 60)
- Party: Democratic Party (since 2007)

Antonella Forattini (born 13 May 1966) is an Italian politician serving as a member of the Chamber of Deputies since 2022. From 2018 to 2022, she was a member of the Regional Council of Lombardy. From 1999 to 2009, she served as mayor of Gonzaga.
