= Francesco Ciancitto =

Italian politician (born 1967)

Member of the Chamber of Deputies
- Incumbent
- Assumed office 13 October 2022
- Constituency: Sicily 2 – 03

Personal details
- Born: 17 March 1967 (age 59)
- Party: Brothers of Italy (since 2013)

Francesco Maria Salvatore Ciancitto (born 17 March 1967) is an Italian politician serving as a member of the Chamber of Deputies since 2022. From 2008 to 2012, he was an assessor of the province of Catania.
