= Barbara Polo =

Italian politician (born 1973)

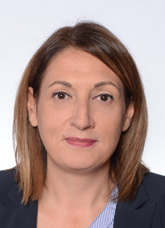
- Polo in 2022

Member of the Chamber of Deputies
- Incumbent
- Assumed office 13 October 2022
- Constituency: Sardinia – U03

Personal details
- Born: 4 February 1973 (age 53)
- Party: Brothers of Italy

Barbara Polo (born 4 February 1973) is an Italian politician serving as a member of the Chamber of Deputies since 2022. She has been an assessor of Ozieri since 2022.
