= International University of Rome =

University in Rome, Italy

Coordinates: 41.8602°N 12.4963°E

Università degli studi Internazionali di Roma (UNINT)
- Motto: in corde sapientiae
- Type: Private
- Established: 1996
- Rector: Mariagrazia Russo
- Administrative staff: 229 (2018)
- Students: 1306 (2018)
- Location: Rome, Italy
- Website: www.unint.eu

The Università degli studi Internazionali di Roma (Italian for "International University of Rome" - UNINT) is a private state-recognised university located in Rome, Italy.

The university was founded in 1996 as Libero Istituto Universitario "San Pio V" and later renamed into Libera Università degli Studi "San Pio V" (LUSPIO). It adopted the present name in 2013 to underline more effectively the global vocation of its educational offer.

== Organisation ==
The university comprises three faculties:

- Faculty of Economics
- Faculty of Interpreting and Translation
- Faculty of Political Sciences and Psycho-social Dynamics

== See also ==
- List of Italian universities
- Rome
