= Gianluca Caramanna =

Italian politician (born 1975)

Member of the Chamber of Deputies
- Incumbent
- Assumed office 13 October 2022
- Constituency: Sicily 1 – 01

Personal details
- Born: 25 July 1975 (age 50)
- Party: Brothers of Italy

Gianluca Caramanna (born 25 July 1975) is an Italian politician serving as a member of the Chamber of Deputies since 2022. He was a municipal councillor of Municipio I from 2008 to 2013 and from 2016 to 2021.
