= Sara Kelany =

Italian politician (born 1978)

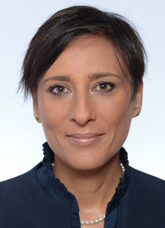
- Kelany in 2022

Member of the Chamber of Deputies
- Incumbent
- Assumed office 13 October 2022
- Constituency: Lombardy 2 – 02

Personal details
- Born: 8 June 1978 (age 47)
- Party: Brothers of Italy (since 2012)

Sara Kelany (born 8 June 1978) is an Italian politician serving as a member of the Chamber of Deputies since 2022. She has served as head of the immigration department of Brothers of Italy since 2023.
