= Silvio Giovine =

Italian politician (born 1983)

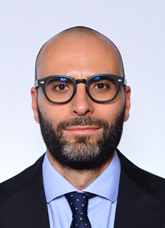
- Giovine in 2022

Member of the Chamber of Deputies
- Incumbent
- Assumed office 13 October 2022
- Constituency: Veneto 2 – 04

Personal details
- Born: 20 December 1983 (age 42)
- Party: Brothers of Italy

Silvio Giovine (born 20 December 1983) is an Italian politician serving as a member of the Chamber of Deputies since 2022. From 2018 to 2023, he served as assessor for commerce of Vicenza.
