= Immacolata Zurzolo =

Italian politician (born 1973)

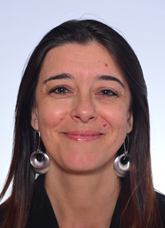
- Zurzolo in 2022

Member of the Chamber of Deputies
- Incumbent
- Assumed office 13 October 2022
- Constituency: Piedmont 1 – P02

Personal details
- Born: 7 June 1973 (age 53)
- Party: Brothers of Italy

Immacolata Concetta Zurzolo (born 7 June 1973) is an Italian politician serving as a member of the Chamber of Deputies since 2022. She was an assessor of Giaveno from 2004 to 2014 and from 2019 to 2024.

== Biography ==
He served as councilor for social and youth policies for the municipality of Giaveno.

In the 2022 early general election, she ran for the Chamber of Deputies on the Brothers of Italy party list in the Piedmont 1 - 02 multi-member district and was elected as a deputy. During the 19th Legislature, she served on the 11th Committee on Public and Private Employment and on the Parliamentary Commission of Inquiry on Femicide and All Forms of Gender-Based Violence.
