= Francesco Michelotti (politician) =

Italian politician (born 1983)

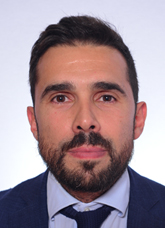
- Michelotti in 2022

Member of the Chamber of Deputies
- Incumbent
- Assumed office 13 October 2022
- Constituency: Tuscany – 02

Personal details
- Born: 31 March 1983 (age 43)
- Party: Brothers of Italy

Francesco Michelotti (born 31 March 1983) is an Italian politician serving as a member of the Chamber of Deputies since 2022. From 2018 to 2022, he was an assessor of Siena.
