= Gian Antonio Girelli =

Italian politician (born 1962)

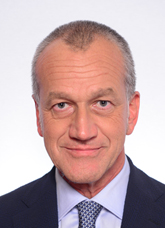
- Girelli in 2022

Member of the Chamber of Deputies
- Incumbent
- Assumed office 13 October 2022
- Constituency: Lombardy 3 – P02

Personal details
- Born: 15 September 1962 (age 63)
- Party: Democratic Party (since 2007)

Gian Antonio Girelli (born 15 September 1962) is an Italian politician serving as a member of the Chamber of Deputies since 2022. From 2010 to 2022, he was a member of the Regional Council of Lombardy. From 1993 to 2006, he served as mayor of Barghe.
