= Alessandro Amorese =

Italian politician (born 1974)

Member of the Chamber of Deputies
- Incumbent
- Assumed office 13 October 2022
- Constituency: Tuscany – 01

Personal details
- Born: 8 October 1974 (age 51)
- Party: Brothers of Italy

Alessandro Amorese (born 8 October 1974) is an Italian politician serving as a member of the Chamber of Deputies since 2022. He was a municipal councillor of Massa from 2008 to 2013 and from 2018 to 2022.

== Biography ==
Born in Carrara in 1974, after earning his classical high school diploma, he received a degree in Political Science from the University of Pisa and worked as a clerk at a shipping agency, a photographer, and a publisher. A freelance journalist since 2008, he has contributed to various publications, including L'Opinione, il Secolo d'Italia, and Area. In 2008, he was one of the founders of the online newspaper Quotidiano Apuano, and in 2009, he founded the publishing house Eclettica in Massa. He is secretary of the Istituto Stato e Partecipazione, where he edits the journal Partecipazione.

He is married and has three children.
