= Luca Sbardella =

Italian politician (born 1973)

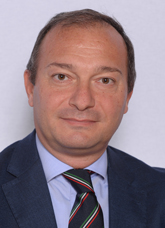
- Sbardella in 2022

Member of the Chamber of Deputies
- Incumbent
- Assumed office 13 October 2022
- Constituency: Lombardy 3 – 02

Personal details
- Born: 26 September 1973 (age 52)
- Party: Brothers of Italy (since 2012)

Luca Sbardella (born 26 September 1973) is an Italian politician serving as a member of the Chamber of Deputies since 2022. He has served as commissioner of Brothers of Italy in Sicily since 2025.
