= Ubaldo Pagano =

Italian politician (born 1979)

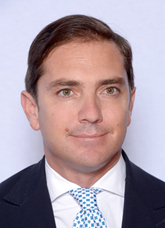
- Pagano in 2022

Member of the Chamber of Deputies
- In office 23 March 2018 – 2 February 2026
- Succeeded by: Francesca Viggiano
- Constituency: Apulia

Personal details
- Born: 16 May 1979 (age 47)
- Party: Democratic Party

Ubaldo Pagano (born 16 May 1979) is an Italian politician serving as a member of the Regional Council of Apulia since 2026. From 2018 to 2026, he was a member of the Chamber of Deputies. Until 2019, he served as provincial secretary of the Democratic Party in Bari.

== Biography ==
In 2013, he was elected provincial secretary of the Democratic Party (Italy) for the province of Bari and was re-elected to the same position in 2016.

In the 2018 general election, he ran for the Chamber of Deputies on the PD’s list in the Puglia - 03 multi-member district and was elected as a deputy. During the 18th legislature, he served as a member and group leader for the PD on the 5th Committee on Budget, Treasury, and Planning, as well as a member of the 12th Committee on Social Affairs, the Parliamentary Commission of Inquiry into the Banking and Financial System, and the Parliamentary Commission on Children and Adolescence.

In the 2022 early general election, he ran again for the Chamber of Deputies as the lead candidate on the Democratic Party – Democratic and Progressive Italy electoral list in the Puglia – 03 multi-member district, and was re-elected as a deputy. During the 19th Legislature, he served on the 5th Committee on Budget, Treasury, and Planning.

In the 2025 regional elections in Puglia, he ran on the PD ticket as part of the Michele Emiliano in support of Antonio Decaro and was elected with approximately 26,000 votes. In February 2026, he resigned from his seat in the Chamber of Deputies to take up the position of regional councilor.
