= Antonio Baldelli =

Italian politician (born 1971)

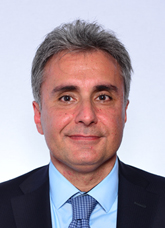
- Baldelli in 2022

Member of the Chamber of Deputies
- Incumbent
- Assumed office 13 October 2022
- Constituency: Marche – P01

Personal details
- Born: 24 June 1971 (age 54)
- Party: Brothers of Italy (since 2015)

Antonio Baldelli (born 24 June 1971) is an Italian politician serving as a member of the Chamber of Deputies since 2022. He has served as deputy mayor of Pergola since 2024.

== Biography ==
He was born in Ancona in 1971. After earning his high school diploma in the sciences, he received a law degree from the University of Urbino.” He holds a master’s degree in management training for healthcare executives and works as a lawyer.
