= Enzo Amich =

Italian politician (born 1977)

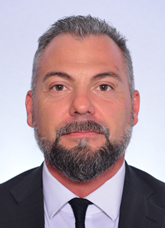
- Amich in 2022

Member of the Chamber of Deputies
- Incumbent
- Assumed office 13 October 2022
- Constituency: Piedmont 2

Personal details
- Born: 26 July 1977 (age 48)
- Party: Brothers of Italy

Vincenzo Amich (born 26 July 1977) is an Italian politician of Brothers of Italy who was elected member of the Chamber of Deputies in 2022. He previously served as mayor of Coniolo.
