= Paolo Pulciani =

Italian politician (born 1972)

Member of the Chamber of Deputies
- Incumbent
- Assumed office 13 October 2022
- Constituency: Lazio 2 – P02

Personal details
- Born: 3 February 1972 (age 54)
- Party: Brothers of Italy

Paolo Pulciani (born 3 February 1972) is an Italian politician serving as a member of the Chamber of Deputies since 2022. From 2017 to 2022, he served as chairman of the municipal council of Pofi.

== Biography ==
Born in Rome in 1972, he earned a law degree from Sapienza University of Rome and has been a member of the bar in the province of Frosinone since 2002.

In the 2022 general election, he was elected to the Chamber of Deputies from the Lazio 2 multi-member district.
