= Fabio Pietrella =

Italian politician (born 1977)

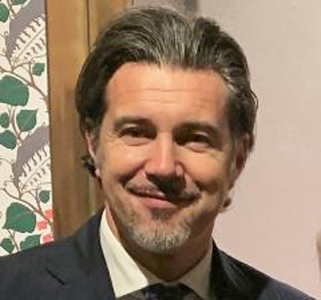
- Pietrella in 2023

Member of the Chamber of Deputies
- Incumbent
- Assumed office 13 October 2022
- Constituency: Lombardy 1 – 02

Personal details
- Born: 11 April 1977 (age 49)
- Party: Brothers of Italy

Fabio Pietrella (born 11 April 1977) is an Italian politician serving as a member of the Chamber of Deputies since 2022. He has been a substitute member of the Parliamentary Assembly of the Council of Europe since 2023.
