= Fabrizio Comba =

Italian politician (born 1966)

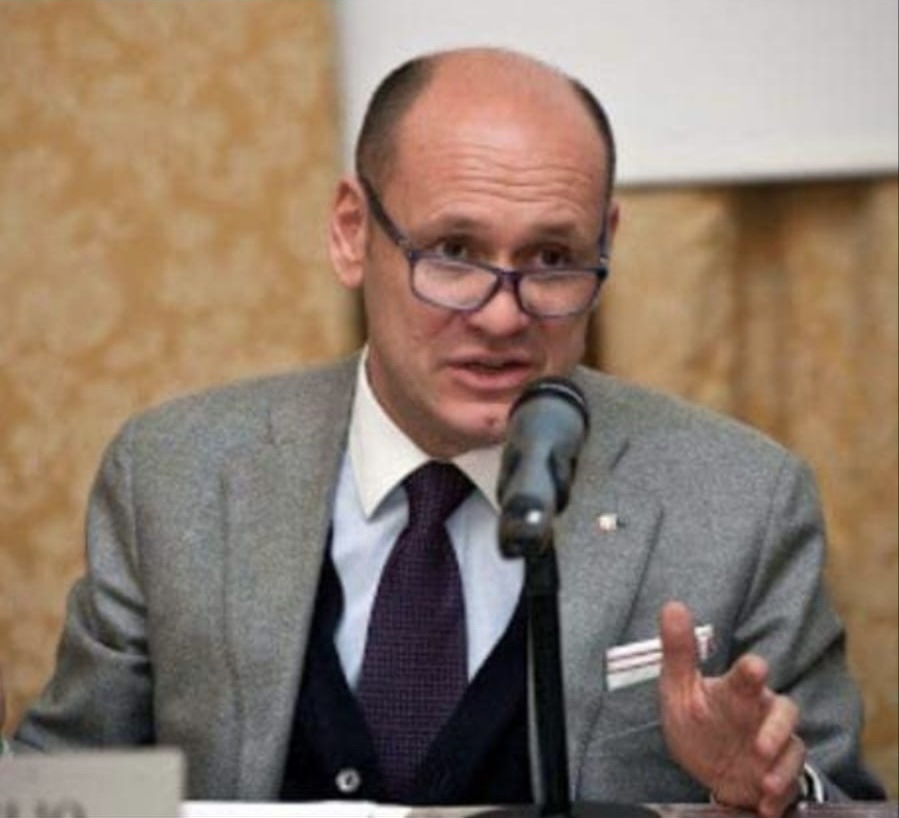
- Comba in 2023

Member of the Chamber of Deputies
- Incumbent
- Assumed office 13 October 2022
- Constituency: Piedmont 2 – 02

Personal details
- Born: 24 March 1966 (age 60)
- Party: Brothers of Italy (since 2012)

Fabrizio Comba (born 24 March 1966) is an Italian politician serving as a member of the Chamber of Deputies since 2022. From 2012 to 2014, he served as vice president of the Regional Council of Piedmont.
