= Francesco Filini =

Italian politician (born 1978)

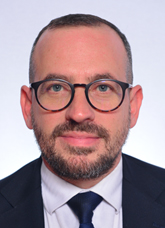
- Filini in 2022

Member of the Chamber of Deputies
- Incumbent
- Assumed office 13 October 2022
- Constituency: Veneto 1

Personal details
- Born: 4 September 1978 (age 47)
- Party: Brothers of Italy

Francesco Filini (born 4 September 1978) is an Italian politician of Brothers of Italy serving as a member of the Chamber of Deputies since 2022. He was a municipal councillor of Municipio III from 2006 to 2008, and served as assessor for social affairs and schools from 2008 to 2013.

== Biography ==
Born in Rome, he earned a degree in political science.

While working as a proofreader and communications officer at the publishing house “Il Bosco e la Nave,” he entered politics at the age of 15 by joining the Fronte della Gioventù, the youth organization of the Italian Social Movement. In 1997, he was elected secretary of the Nomentano chapter of Youth Action (Italy).

In 2006, he was elected to the Rome-Monte Sacro (quarter) Council as a member of the National Alliance (Italy). Re-elected as a member of the People of Freedom party, he served as councilor for social, educational, and youth policies for the same city council from 2008 to 2013. Also in 2013, he joined the election committee of Fratelli d'Italia in preparation for the general election.

In the 2022 early general election, he ran for the Chamber of Deputies on the Brothers of Italy party list in the Veneto 1 - 01 multi-member district and was elected as a deputy. During the 19th Legislature, he served on the 6th Finance Committee, the Parliamentary Supervisory Committee for RAI, and the controversial Parliamentary Commission of Inquiry into the SARS-CoV-2 epidemiological health emergency.
