= Gianni Lampis =

Italian politician (born 1988)

Member of the Chamber of Deputies
- Incumbent
- Assumed office 13 October 2022
- Constituency: Sardinia – 02

Personal details
- Born: 31 May 1988 (age 37)
- Party: Brothers of Italy (since 2012)

Gianni Lampis (born 31 May 1988) is an Italian politician serving as a member of the Chamber of Deputies since 2022. From 2019 to 2022, he served as assessor for the environment of Sardinia.
