= Maria Stefania Marino =

Italian politician (born 1969)

Member of the Chamber of Deputies
- Incumbent
- Assumed office 13 October 2022
- Constituency: Sicily 2 – P01

Personal details
- Born: 5 January 1969 (age 57)
- Party: Democratic Party

Maria Stefania Marino (born 5 January 1969) is an Italian politician serving as a member of the Chamber of Deputies since 2022. From 2015 to 2022, she was a municipal councillor of Enna.
