= Rosanna Filippin =

Italian politician (born 1962)

- Filippin in 2024

Member of the Chamber of Deputies
- Incumbent
- Assumed office 20 December 2024
- Preceded by: Enrico Letta

Member of the Senate of the Republic
- In office 15 March 2013 – 22 March 2018

Personal details
- Born: 8 February 1962 (age 64) Bassano del Grappa, Province of Vicenza, Italy
- Party: Democratic Party
- Education: University of Padua
- Occupation: Lawyer

Rosanna Filippin (born 8 February 1962) is an Italian lawyer and politician who has served as a member of the Chamber of Deputies since September 2024. She previously served as a member of the Senate of the Republic from 2013 to 2018.
