= Patrizia Prestipino =

Italian politician (born 1963)

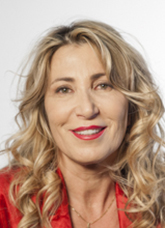
- Prestipino in 2018

Member of the Chamber of Deputies
- Incumbent
- Assumed office 9 July 2024
- Preceded by: Nicola Zingaretti
- Constituency: Lazio 1 – P01
- In office 23 March 2018 – 12 October 2022
- Constituency: Lazio 1 – U08

Personal details
- Born: 16 September 1963 (age 62)
- Party: Democratic Party (since 2007)

Patrizia Prestipino (born 16 September 1963) is an Italian politician. She has been a member of the Chamber of Deputies since 2024, having previously served from 2018 to 2022. From 2006 to 2008, she served as mayor of Municipio Roma XII.
