= Stefania Ascari =

Italian politician (born 1980)

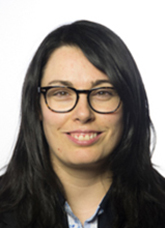

Member of the Chamber of Deputies
- Incumbent
- Assumed office March 23, 2018

Personal details
- Born: March 23, 1980 (age 46) Correggio, Emilia-Romagna, Italy
- Party: Five Star Movement
- Education: University of Modena and Reggio Emilia
- Occupation: Politician

Stefania Ascari (born 3 May 1980) is an Italian politician from the Five Star Movement (M5S). She has been a member of Italy's Chamber of Deputies from Emilia-Romagna since the 2018 Italian general election.

== Political career ==
A member of the M5S, she was elected councilor of Modena's District 2 (Crocetta, San Lazzaro, East Modena) in March 2016. In the 2018 Italian general election, she was nominated by the M5S and elected to the Chamber of Deputies in the Emilia-Romagna – 02 plurality constituency.

During the 2022 Italian general election, she ran as a candidate for the Chamber of Deputies representing the M5S in the Emilia-Romagna – 04 (Modena) single-member district. In this constituency, she secured 11.05 percent of the vote, trailing behind Daniela Dondi of the centre-right with 37.44 percent and Aboubakar Soumahoro of the centre-left with 36.01 percent. She also ran as a candidate for the Chamber of Deputies in the Emilia-Romagna – 02 multi-member constituency, where she successfully won a seat.

== See also ==
- List of members of the Italian Chamber of Deputies, 2018–2022
- List of members of the Chamber of Deputies of Italy, 2022–present
