= Beatriz Colombo =

Italian politician (born 1978)

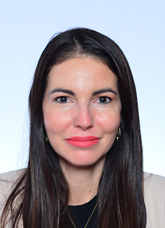
- Colombo in 2022

Member of the Chamber of Deputies
- Incumbent
- Assumed office 13 October 2022
- Constituency: Emilia-Romagna – 02

Personal details
- Born: 13 March 1978 (age 48)
- Party: Brothers of Italy

Beatriz Colombo (born 13 March 1978) is an Italian politician serving as a member of the Chamber of Deputies since 2022. From 2022 to 2023, she was a municipal councillor of Riccione.
