= Silvio Lai =

Italian politician (born 1966)

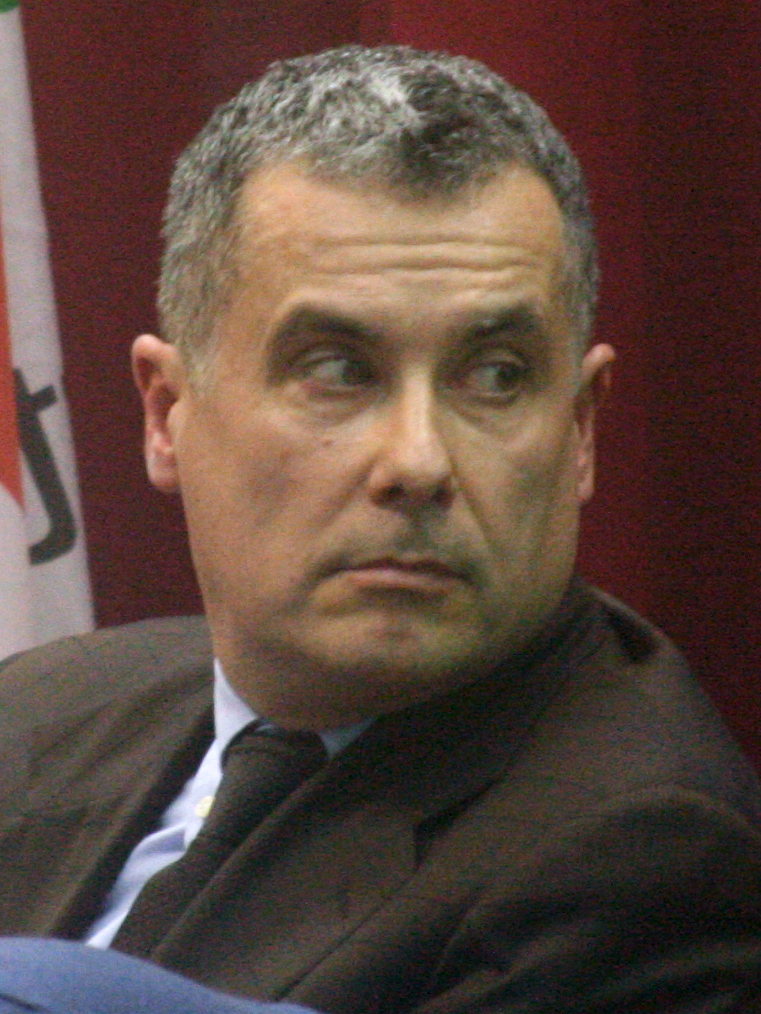
- Lai in 2018

Member of the Chamber of Deputies
- Incumbent
- Assumed office 13 October 2022
- Constituency: Sardinia – P01

Member of the Senate
- In office 15 March 2013 – 22 March 2018
- Constituency: Sardinia

Personal details
- Born: 20 July 1966 (age 59)
- Party: Democratic Party (since 2007)

Bachisio Silvio Lai (born 20 July 1966) is an Italian politician serving as a member of the Chamber of Deputies since 2022. From 2013 to 2018, he was a member of the Senate.
