= Antonino Iaria =

Italian politician (born 1970)

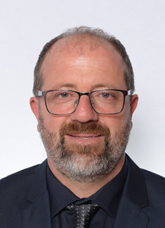
- Iaria in 2022

Member of the Chamber of Deputies
- Incumbent
- Assumed office 13 October 2022
- Constituency: Piedmont 1 – P01

Personal details
- Born: 27 December 1970 (age 55)
- Party: Five Star Movement

Antonino Iaria (born 27 December 1970) is an Italian politician serving as a member of the Chamber of Deputies since 2022. From 2019 to 2021, he was an assessor of Turin.

== Biography ==
In 2007, he became involved with the “Amici di Beppe Grillo” meetup group in Turin, helping to organize the first V-Day in Piazza Castello and the second in Piazza San Carlo in 2008. He has held various roles within the Five Star Movement (M5S). His first elected office was as a district councilor for Turin, a position he held from 2011 to 2016; from 2016 to 2019, he served as a city councilor for Turin. He subsequently served as the city councilor responsible for Urban Planning, Public works, and Piazza San Carlo.

In September 2024, during the debate on the measure to give greater weight to conduct grades in secondary schools, he made a speech in which he mocked the Meloni government.
