= Giovanna Miele =

Italian politician (born 1980)

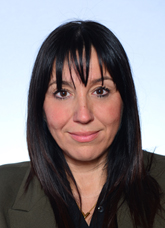
- Miele in 2022

Member of the Chamber of Deputies
- Incumbent
- Assumed office 13 October 2022
- Constituency: Lazio 2 – 02

Personal details
- Born: 24 July 1980 (age 46)
- Party: Lega (since 2021)

Giovanna Miele (born 24 July 1980) is an Italian politician serving as a member of the Chamber of Deputies since 2022. From 2016 to 2022, she was a city councillor of Latina.

== Biography ==
She began her political career with Forza Italia (2013). In 2016, she was elected to the Latina City Council, and in 2017, she was also elected to the Latina Provincial Council. In 2021, she left Forza Italia and joined the League.

In the September 2022 general election, she was elected to the Chamber of Deputies as part of the center-right coalition in the Lazio 2 multi-member district, representing the League.
