= Salvatore Marcello Di Mattina =

Italian politician (born 1970)

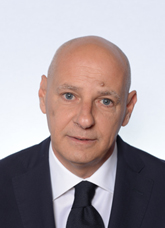
- Di Mattina in 2022

Member of the Chamber of Deputies
- Incumbent
- Assumed office 13 October 2022
- Constituency: Apulia – P04

Personal details
- Born: 5 January 1970 (age 56)
- Party: Lega

Salvatore Marcello Di Mattina (born 5 January 1970) is an Italian politician serving as a member of the Chamber of Deputies since 2022. From 2021 to 2022, he was an assessor of Gallipoli.
