= Carlo Maccari =

Italian politician (born 1965)

Member of the Chamber of Deputies
- Incumbent
- Assumed office 13 October 2022
- Constituency: Lombardy 4 – 01

Personal details
- Born: 11 May 1965 (age 60)
- Party: Brothers of Italy (since 2012)

Carlo Maccari (born 11 May 1965) is an Italian politician serving as a member of the Chamber of Deputies since 2022. From 2010 to 2012, he served as assessor for simplification and digitalization of Lombardy.
