= Martina Semenzato =

Italian politician (born 1973)

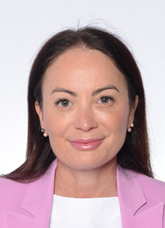
- Semenzato in 2022

Member of the Chamber of Deputies
- Incumbent
- Assumed office 13 October 2022
- Constituency: Veneto 1 – U01

Personal details
- Born: 9 July 1973 (age 52)
- Party: Coraggio Italia

Martina Semenzato (born 9 July 1973) is an Italian politician serving as a member of the Chamber of Deputies since 2022. She has served as chairwoman of the inquiry committee on femicide and gender-related violence since 2023.
