= Umbria (Chamber of Deputies constituency) =

- Chamber of Deputies; Electoral constituency
- Region: Umbria
- Electorate: 672,313 (2018)
- Major settlements: Perugia, Terni

Current constituency
- Created: 1993
- Seats: 9
- Members: M5S (2); PD (2); Lega (2); FI (2); FdI (1)

Umbria is one of the 29 constituencies (Italian: circoscrizioni) represented in the Chamber of Deputies, the lower house of the Italian parliament. The constituency currently elects 9 deputies. Its boundaries correspond to those of the Italian region of Umbria. The electoral system uses a parallel voting system, which act as a mixed system, with 37% of seats allocated using a first-past-the-post electoral system and 61% using a proportional method, with one round of voting.

The constituency was first established by the Mattarella law on 4 August 1993 and later confirmed by the Calderoli law on 21 December 2005 and by the Rosato law on 3 November 2017.
