= Chiara Tenerini =

Italian politician (born 1972)

Member of the Chamber of Deputies
- Incumbent
- Assumed office 13 October 2022
- Constituency: Tuscany – U03

Personal details
- Born: 8 December 1972 (age 53)
- Party: Forza Italia

Chiara Tenerini (born 8 December 1972) is an Italian politician serving as a member of the Chamber of Deputies since 2022. From 2019 to 2023, she served as deputy chairwoman of the municipal council of Cecina.

== Biography ==
Born in San Miniato, she grew up in Cecina, Tuscany, where she was elected to the city council in June 2019 as a member of Forza Italia and served as vice president of the council. She ran twice for the Regional Council of Tuscany—in 2015 and 2020—representing the province of Livorno, but was not elected.

In the 2022 general election, she was elected to the Chamber of Deputies from the single-member district of Livorno with 35.9% of the vote.
