= Federico Gianassi =

Italian politician (born 1980)

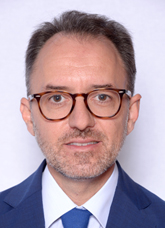
- Gianassi in 2022

Member of the Chamber of Deputies
- Incumbent
- Assumed office 13 October 2022
- Constituency: Tuscany – 07

Personal details
- Born: 21 May 1980 (age 45)
- Party: Democratic Party

Federico Gianassi (born 21 May 1980) is an Italian politician serving as a member of the Chamber of Deputies since 2022. From 2014 to 2022, he was an assessor of Florence.
