= Cristina Almici =

Italian politician

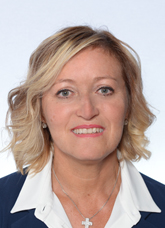

Member of the Chamber of Deputies of Italy
- Incumbent
- Assumed office 2022
- Constituency: Lombardy 3

Personal details
- Born: June 16, 1969 (age 56) BRESCIA
- Party: Brothers of Italy

Cristina Almici is a member of the Chamber of Deputies of Italy.
