= Andrea Pellicini =

Italian politician (born 1970)

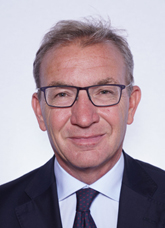
- Pellicini in 2022

Member of the Chamber of Deputies
- Incumbent
- Assumed office 13 October 2022
- Constituency: Lombardy 2 – U01

Personal details
- Born: 28 January 1970 (age 56)
- Party: Brothers of Italy (since 2013)

Andrea Pellicini (born 28 January 1970) is an Italian politician serving as a member of the Chamber of Deputies since 2022. From 2010 to 2020, he served as mayor of Luino.

== Biography ==
A native of Luino, he is the son of Piero Pellicini, a senator for the National Alliance from 1996 to 2006, and the grandson of Giuseppe Pellicini, mayor of San Miniato from 1934 to 1940. He holds a law degree from the University of Milan and practices law (as did his father and grandfather) at the Bar of Varese. He is married and the father of two children.
