= Daniela Morfino =

Italian politician (born 1974)

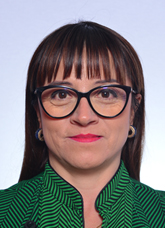
- Morfino in 2022

Member of the Chamber of Deputies
- Incumbent
- Assumed office 13 October 2022
- Constituency: Sicily 1 – P01

Personal details
- Born: 14 May 1974 (age 52)
- Party: Five Star Movement

Daniela Morfino (born 14 May 1974) is an Italian politician serving as a member of the Chamber of Deputies since 2022. From 1992 to 2022, she worked as a primary school teacher.
