= Francesco Mura =

Italian politician (born 1983)

Member of the Chamber of Deputies
- Incumbent
- Assumed office 13 October 2022
- Constituency: Sardinia – 01

Personal details
- Born: 20 September 1983 (age 42)
- Party: Brothers of Italy

Francesco Mura (born 20 September 1983) is an Italian politician serving as a member of the Chamber of Deputies since 2022. He has served as coordinator of Brothers of Italy in Sardinia since 2024. From 2018 to 2023, he served as coordinator of the party in the province of Oristano. From 2019 to 2022, he was a member of the Regional Council of Sardinia. From 2018 to 2023, he served as mayor of Nughedu Santa Vittoria.
