= Toni Ricciardi =

Italian politician (born 1977)

Member of the Chamber of Deputies
- Incumbent
- Assumed office 13 October 2022
- Constituency: Europe

Personal details
- Born: 20 December 1977 (age 48)
- Citizenship: Italy; Switzerland
- Party: Democratic Party

Toni Ricciardi (born 20 December 1977) is an Italian politician serving as a member of the Chamber of Deputies since 2022. He has served as secretary of the Democratic Party's branch in Switzerland since 2018. From 2005 to 2015, he was a municipal councillor of Castelfranci.

== Biography ==
He was born in Irpinia in 1977, but when he was just 8 months old, he moved with his parents to Baar, Switzerland, Switzerland. He also holds Swiss citizenship.

He has been the national secretary of the Democratic Party (Italy) since October 28, 2019.

He was elected to Parliament for the first time in the 2022 elections in the Overseas Constituency—Europe Division, representing the Democratic Party (Italy).
