= Antonio Ferrara (politician) =

Italian politician (born 1970)

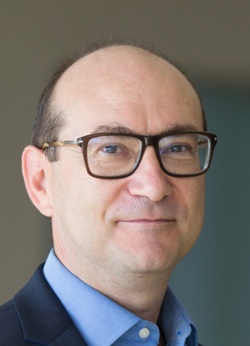
- Ferrara in 2024

Member of the Chamber of Deputies
- Incumbent
- Assumed office 10 April 2024
- Preceded by: Alessandra Todde
- Constituency: Lombardy 2 – P01

Personal details
- Born: 28 January 1970 (age 56)
- Party: Five Star Movement

Antonio Ferrara (born 28 January 1970) is an Italian politician serving as a member of the Chamber of Deputies since 2024. In the 2021 local elections, he was the lead candidate of the Five Star Movement in Varese.

== Biography ==
He holds a master's degree in Hospitality Management from the London Metropolitan University; he is a business executive and consultant.

He joined the Five Star Movement in 2014 and, during the 2021 municipal elections, ran for city council in support of Varese’s incumbent mayor, Davide Galimberti. Although the mayor was re-elected, the Movement did not win any seats on the city council.

Ahead of the 2022 general election, he ran for a seat in the Chamber of Deputies as the second candidate on the proportional representation list for the Lombardy 2 constituency, finishing as the top non-elected candidate, behind M5S Vice President Alessandra Todde. The following year, he ran in the regional elections in Lombardy in support of the center-left gubernatorial candidate Pierfrancesco Majorino, but was not elected in that race either.

She officially took her seat in Italian Parliament on April 10, 2024, succeeding Todde, who had forfeited her seat upon being elected president of the Sardinia Region.

Political Activities and Positions: He is a member of the 10th Committee of the Chamber of Deputies, which deals with Industry, Energy, and Tourism.
