= Marche (Chamber of Deputies constituency) =

- Chamber of Deputies; Electoral constituency
- Region: Marche
- Electorate: 1,184,079 (2018)
- Major settlements: Ancona, Ascoli Piceno, Fermo, Macerata, Pesaro, Urbino

Current constituency
- Created: 1993
- Seats: 16
- Members: M5S (9); Lega (3); PD (2); FI (1); FdI (1)

Marche is one of the 29 constituencies (Italian: circoscrizioni) represented in the Chamber of Deputies, the lower house of the Italian parliament. The constituency currently elects 16 deputies. Its boundaries correspond to those of the Italian region of Marche. The electoral system uses a parallel voting system, which act as a mixed system, with 37% of seats allocated using a first-past-the-post electoral system and 61% using a proportional method, with one round of voting.

The constituency was first established by the Mattarella law on 4 August 1993 and later confirmed by the Calderoli law on 21 December 2005 and by the Rosato law on 3 November 2017.

== Elected members ==
=== Legislature XVIII (2018–present) ===
Single-member districts
District			Electoral list	Deputy	Parliamentary group		Ref.	
N.	Name	Map	Electoral list	Deputy	At election	Current	Ref.	
01	Ascoli Piceno		Five Star Movement	Roberto Cataldi		Five Star Movement		
02	Civitanova Marche		Five Star Movement	Mirella Emiliozzi		Five Star Movement		
03	Macerata		Lega	Tullio Patassini		Lega		
04	Ancona		Five Star Movement	Patrizia Terzoni		Five Star Movement		
05	Fano		Five Star Movement	Maurizio Cattoi		Five Star Movement		
06	Pesaro		Five Star Movement	Andrea Cecconi		Independent within the Federation of the Greens		Source: Ministry of the Interior
