= Anna Laura Orrico =

Italian politician

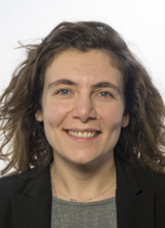
- Born: 29 December 1980 (age 45); Cosenza, Italy
- Education: University of Calabria
- Occupations: politician, entrepreneur
- Political party: Five Star Movement

Member of the Chamber of Deputies
- Incumbent
- Assumed office 23 March 2018
- Constituency: Cosenza

Undersecretary of Ministry for Cultural Heritage and Activities
- In office 16 September 2019 – 13 February 2012
- Preceded by: Lucia Borgonzoni; Gianluca Vacca
- Succeeded by: Lucia Borgonzoni

Anna Laura Orrico (born 29 December 1980 in Cosenza) is an Italian politician and entrepreneur.

== Biography ==
She is a Deputy of the Legislature XVIII of Italy with the Five Star Movement for the college of Cosenza, from 16 September 2019 to 13 February 2021 she has been Undersecretary of the Ministry for Cultural Heritage and Activities of the Conte II Government.

In September 2022, she won back a seat in the Parliament.
