= Lombardy 4 (Chamber of Deputies constituency) =

- Chamber of Deputies; Electoral constituency
- Region: Lombardy
- Electorate: 1,249,579 (2018)
- Major settlements: Cremona, Lodi, Mantua, Pavia

Current constituency
- Created: 2017
- Seats: 17
- Members: Lega (7); FI (4); M5S (3); PD (3)

Lombardy 4 is one of the 29 constituencies (Italian: circoscrizioni) represented in the Chamber of Deputies, the lower house of the Italian parliament. The constituency currently elects 17 deputies. Its boundaries correspond to those of the provinces of Cremona, Lodi, Mantua and Pavia, within the Lombardy region. The electoral system uses a parallel voting system, which act as a mixed system, with 37% of seats allocated using a first-past-the-post electoral system and 61% using a proportional method, with one round of voting.

The constituency was established by the Rosato law on 3 November 2017.
