= Elisabetta Lancellotta =

Italian politician (born 1979)

Member of the Chamber of Deputies
- Incumbent
- Assumed office 13 October 2022
- Constituency: Molise – 01

Personal details
- Born: 2 March 1979 (age 47)
- Party: Brothers of Italy

Elisabetta Christiana Lancellotta (born 2 March 1979) is an Italian politician serving as a member of the Chamber of Deputies since 2022. From 2016 to 2023, she was a municipal councillor of Isernia.
