= Andrea Di Giuseppe =

Italian politician (born 1968)

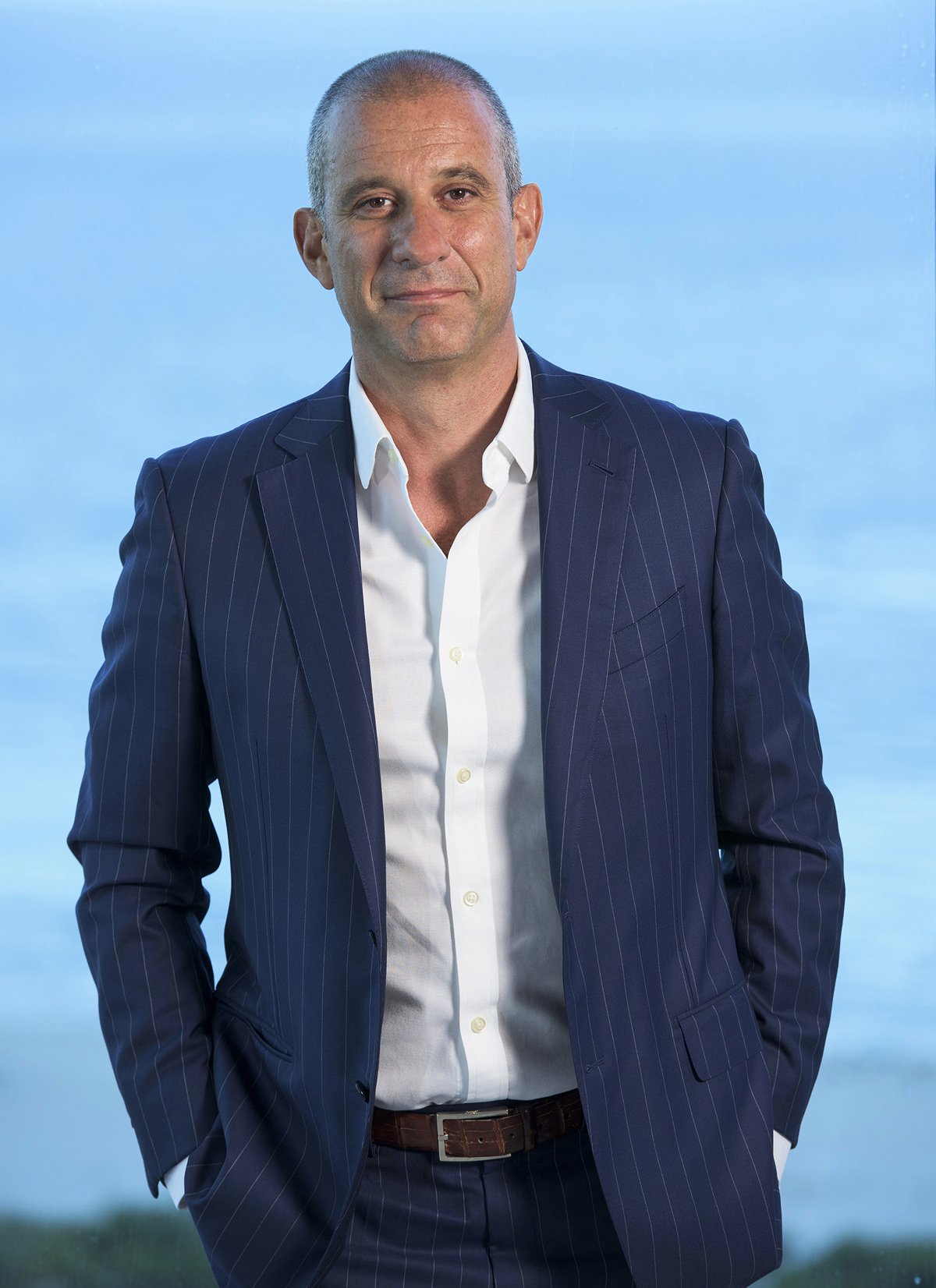
- Di Giuseppe in 2023

Member of the Chamber of Deputies
- Incumbent
- Assumed office 13 October 2022
- Constituency: North and Central America

Personal details
- Born: 20 May 1968 (age 57)
- Party: Brothers of Italy

Andrea Di Giuseppe (born 20 May 1968) is an Italian politician serving as a member of the Chamber of Deputies since 2022. He is the chairman of the standing committee on international trade.
