= 2001 Italian general election in Trentino-Alto Adige/Südtirol =

The 2001 Italian general election took place on 13 May 2001. In Trentino-Alto Adige/Südtirol, 17 seats were up for election: 10 for the Chamber of Deputies and 7 for the Senate of the Republic.

The South Tyrolean People's Party (SVP) joined The Olive Tree in the 1996 general election and stayed there but they also submit candidates on their own. Their sister party Trentino Tyrolean Autonomist Party joined the centre-right coalition but after their party secretary Giacomo Bezzi failed to win a seat. PATT later joined the centre-left coalition in the 2003 provincial election.

== Results ==
=== Full results ===
==== Chamber of Deputies ====
Party or alliance		FPTP			Party vote			Total seats
Party or alliance		Votes	%	Seats	Votes	%	Seats	Total seats
House of Freedoms	Forza Italia	189,540	31.05	–	100,801	16.57	1	1
House of Freedoms	National Alliance	189,540	31.05	0	57,865	9.51	–	–
House of Freedoms	Lega Nord (LNAAST–LNT–PATT)	189,540	31.05	0	22,273	3.66	–	–
House of Freedoms	White Flower (CCD–CDU–UPD)	189,540	31.05	0	12,673	2.08	–	–
House of Freedoms	Abolish Scorporo	189,540	31.05	0	501	0.08	–	–
South Tyrolean People's Party		173,735	28.46	3	200,059	32.88	–	3
The Olive Tree	Democracy is Freedom – The Daisy (incl. CM)	24,031	3.94	–	70,853	11.64	1	2
The Olive Tree	Democrats of the Left	24,031	3.94	0	54,155	8.90	–	2
The Olive Tree	The Sunflower (FdV–SDI–VGV)	24,031	3.94	0	23,663	3.89	–	1
The Olive Tree	Communist Refoundation Party (Note: Officially not part of the alliance but supported their candidates.)	24,031	3.94	0	16,510	2.71	–	–
The Olive Tree	Party of Italian Communists	24,031	3.94	0	3,046	0.50	–	–
The Olive Tree	Ladin Autonomist Union	24,031	3.94	0	0	0.00	–	1
Italy of Values		26,014	4.26	0	24,663	4.05	–	–
Bonino-Pannella List		6,471	1.06	0	11,808	1.94	–	–
The Olive Tree–SVP		190,556	31.22	5				–
European Democracy		0	0.00	–	9,643	1.58	–	–
Total		610,347	100.00	8	608,513	100.00	2	10
Valid votes		610,347	92.48		608,513	92.73		
Invalid/blank votes		49,595	7.52		47,742	7.27		
Total votes		659,942	100.00		656,255	100.00		
Registered voters/turnout		778,248	84.80					
Source: Ministry of the Interior

===== Trentino =====
Party or alliance		FPTP		Party vote		Seats
Party or alliance		Votes	%	Votes	%	Seats
The Olive Tree–SVP	Democracy is Freedom – The Daisy (CM)	152,979	51.67	51,393	15.91	–
The Olive Tree–SVP	Democrats of the Left	152,979	51.67	45,086	13.95	2
The Olive Tree–SVP	South Tyrolean People's Party	152,979	51.67	18,427	5.70	–
The Olive Tree–SVP	Communist Refoundation Party	152,979	51.67	12,044	3.73	–
The Olive Tree–SVP	The Sunflower (FdV–SDI)	152,979	51.67	7,042	2.18	1
The Olive Tree–SVP	Party of Italian Communists	152,979	51.67	2,241	0.69	–
The Olive Tree–SVP	Ladin Autonomist Union	152,979	51.67	0	0.00	1
House of Freedoms	Forza Italia	119,108	40.23	93,097	28.81	–
House of Freedoms	National Alliance	119,108	40.23	26,900	8.33	–
House of Freedoms	Lega Nord (LNT–PATT)	119,108	40.23	20,323	6.29	–
House of Freedoms	White Flower (CCD–UPD)	119,108	40.23	11,370	3.52	–
House of Freedoms	Abolish Scorporo	119,108	40.23	342	0.11	–
Italy of Values		20,450	6.91	18,205	5.63	–
European Democracy		0	0.00	8,889	2.75	–
Bonino-Pannella List		3,549	1.20	7,740	2.40	–
Total		296,086	100.00	323,099	100.00	4
Valid votes		296,086	92.52	323,099	92.45	
Invalid/blank votes		23,926	7.48	26,405	7.55	
Total votes		320,012	100.00	349,504	100.00	
Registered voters/turnout		399,331	80.14			
Source: Ministry of the Interior

===== South Tyrol =====
Party or alliance		FPTP		Party vote		Seats
Party or alliance		Votes	%	Votes	%	Seats
South Tyrolean People's Party		173,735	58.00	181,629	60.50	3
House of Freedoms	National Alliance	55,697	18.60	30,978	10.32	–
House of Freedoms	Forza Italia	55,697	18.60	22,448	7.48	–
House of Freedoms	Lega Nord (LNAAST)	55,697	18.60	1,937	0.65	–
House of Freedoms	White Flower (CCD–CDU)	55,697	18.60	1,304	0.43	–
House of Freedoms	Abolish Scorporo	55,697	18.60	123	0.04	–
The Olive Tree	Democracy is Freedom – The Daisy	24,031	8.02	20,368	6.78	–
The Olive Tree	The Sunflower (VGV–SDI)	24,031	8.02	16,630	5.54	–
The Olive Tree	Democrats of the Left	24,031	8.02	8,177	2.72	–
The Olive Tree	Communist Refoundation Party	24,031	8.02	4,477	1.49	–
The Olive Tree	Party of Italian Communists	24,031	8.02	835	0.28	–
Italy of Values		5,564	1.86	6,494	2.16	–
Bonino-Pannella List		2,922	0.98	4,053	1.35	–
European Democracy		0	0.00	739	0.25	–
The Olive Tree–SVP (Note: Bolzano only)		37,577	12.55	0	0.00	1
Total		299,526	100.00	300,192	100.00	4
Valid votes		299,526	92.63	300,192	92.84	
Invalid/blank votes		23,816	7.37	23,147	7.16	
Total votes		323,342	100.00	323,339	100.00	
Registered voters/turnout		378,917	85.33			
Source: Ministry of the Interior

==== Senate of the Republic ====
Party	Votes	%	Seats
The Olive Tree–SVP	175,635	31.89	3
House of Freedoms	170,029	30.87	2
SVP	126,177	22.91	2
Italy of Values	26,603	4.83	–
The Olive Tree	18,312	3.33	–
Communist Refoundation Party	16,326	2.96	–
Bonino-Pannella List	12,294	2.23	–
Die Freiheitlichen	5,354	0.97	–
Total	550,730	100.00	7
Valid votes	550,730	92.68	
Invalid/blank votes	43,514	7.32	
Total votes	594,244	100.00	
Registered voters/turnout	703,297	84.49	
Source: Ministry of the Interior

Vote in Trentino

Party	Votes	%	Seats
The Olive Tree–SVP	122,196	43.25	2
House of Freedoms	120,456	42.64	1
Italy of Values	19,612	6.94	–
Communist Refoundation Party	11,812	4.18	–
Bonino-Pannella List	8,184	2.90	–
Die Freiheitlichen	245	0.09	–
Total	282,505	100.00	3
Valid votes	282,505	92.75	
Invalid/blank votes	22,067	7.25	
Total votes	304,572	100.00	
Registered voters/turnout	363,801	83.72	
Source: Ministry of the Interior

Vote in South Tyrol

Party	Votes	%	Seats
SVP	126,177	47.04	2
The Olive Tree–SVP	53,439	19.92	1
House of Freedoms	49,573	18.48	–
The Olive Tree	18,312	6.83	–
Italy of Values	6,991	2.61	–
Die Freiheitlichen	5,109	1.90	–
Communist Refoundation Party	4,514	1.68	–
Bonino-Pannella List	4,110	1.53	–
Total	268,225	100.00	3
Valid votes	268,225	92.60	
Invalid/blank votes	21,447	7.40	
Total votes	289,672	100.00	
Registered voters/turnout	339,496	85.32	
Source: Ministry of the Interior

=== Elected members of Parliament ===
==== Chamber of Deputies ====
Südtiroler Volkspartei

- Siegfried Brugger
- Hans Widmann
- Karl Zeller

Forza Italia

- Paolo Scarpa Bonazza Buora

The Daisy

- Gianclaudio Bressa
- Sergio Mattarella

Democrats of the Left

- Giovanni Kessler
- Luigi Olivieri

The Sunflower

- Marco Boato (FdV)

Ladin Autonomist Union

- Giuseppe Detomas

==== Senate of the Republic ====
Südtiroler Volkspartei

- Helga Thaler Ausserhofer
- Alois Kofler
- Oskar Peterlini (for SVP-L'ULIVO)

The Daisy

- Renzo Michelini (Daisy Civic List)
- Mauro Betta (Daisy Civic List)

CCD–UDC

- Renzo Gubert (UPD)
- Ivo Tarolli (CCD)

== See also ==
- 2001 Italian general election in Aosta Valley
- Proporz
