= United Democratic Christians =

United Christian Democrats Democratici Cristiani Uniti
- Abbreviation: DCU
- Leader: Giovanni Mongiello
- Founded: 2005
- Dissolved: 2008 (de facto)
- Split from: Union of Christian and Centre Democrats
- Ideology: Christian democracy
- Political position: Centre
- National affiliation: The Union (2006-2008)
- Colors: Light blue

The United Democratic Christians (Democratici Cristiani Uniti, DCU) was a Christian-democratic Italian political party based in the Italian region of Apulia.

The party was founded by Giovanni Mongiello, formerly a Christian Democrat, who had been Undersecretary of Agriculture in the second Prodi government, by a split from the Union of Christian and Centre Democrats (UDC) in 2004. Monticello and his followers were mostly former members of the United Christian Democrats, who had opposed the merger into of their party into the new grouping. Mongiello had been President of the Party of Christian Democracy until 2005, before launching his own party.

In the 2006 general election the party was affiliated to The Union, the centre-left coalition led by Romano Prodi.
