= Us of the Centre =

Christian-democratic political party in Italy

Us of the Centre Noi di Centro
- Secretary: Clemente Mastella
- President: Giorgio Merlo
- Founded: 28 November 2021
- Preceded by: Union of Democrats for Europe
- Ideology: Christian democracy
- Political position: Centre
- National affiliation: Italy in the Centre (2021–2022); NDC–Europeanists–DC (since 2022)
- Chamber of Deputies: 0 / 400
- Senate: 0 / 200
- European Parliament: 0 / 76
- Regional Councils: 2 / 896

Website
- noidicentro.org

Us of the Centre (Italian: Noi di Centro, NDC), is a minor Christian-democratic political party in Italy based in Campania, where it is known also as Us Campanians (Noi Campani). Led by Clemente Mastella, Minister of Labour in Berlusconi I Cabinet (1994–1995), minister of Justice in Prodi II Cabinet (2006–2008), and mayor of Benevento (since 2016), the party is the successor of the Union of Democrats for Europe (UDEUR).

== History ==
In the summer of 2020, Mastella re-organised his followers under the banner of Us Campanians, which obtained 4.4% of the vote and 2 regional councillors, in support of the incumbent president Vincenzo De Luca of the Democratic Party (PD) in the 2020 Campania regional election. In the 2021 Italian local elections, Mastella was re-elected mayor of Benevento.

In November 2021, Mastella launched Us of the Centre in order to compete in countrywide elections. In December 2021, during a party assembly in Rome, Mastella was elected secretary and Giorgio Merlo, a journalist and former long-time deputy of the Italian People's Party (PPI), Democracy is Freedom – The Daisy, and the PD from Piedmont, president. Subsequently, Mastella's wife Sandra Lonardo, elected senator for Forza Italia (FI) in the 2018 Italian general election, left that party and joined Cambiamo!'s sub-group in the Senate's Mixed Group, whose name was changed in order to include "Us of the Centre (Us Campanians)". The sub-group's main name would soon become "Italy in the Centre".

In June 2022, during a party convention in Naples, Mastella proposed an alliance with Matteo Renzi's Italia Viva (IV) and Giovanni Toti's Italy in the Centre (IaC), in a sort of re-edition of the Daisy, which put the UDEUR together with the PPI, The Democrats, and Italian Renewal in the run-up of the 2001 Italian general election. Mastella then announced he would run by himself, along with Europeanists, to avoid to collect signatures.

== Election results ==
=== Italian Parliament ===
Election	Leader	Chamber of Deputies				Senate of the Republic				Government
Election	Leader	Votes	%	Seats	+/–	Votes	%	Seats	+/–	Government
2022	Clemente Mastella	46,109 (Note: In a joint list with Europeanists and Christian Democracy.)	0.16	0 / 400	New	42,860	0.16	0 / 200	New	No seats

=== European Parliament ===
Election	Leader	Votes	%	Seats	+/–	EP Group
2024	Clemente Mastella	Into USE		0 / 76	New	–

=== Regional elections ===
Election	Votes	%	Seats	+/–
2025	71,260 (Note: In a joint list with We the South.)	3.55	2 / 51	New

== Symbols ==
2021–2022

2022–2025

2025–

== Leadership ==
- Secretary: Clemente Mastella (2021–present)
- President: Giorgio Merlo (2021—present)

== See also ==
- List of political parties in Italy
