= 2001 Italian general election in Veneto =

The Italian general election of 2001 took place on 13 May 2001.

The election was won in Veneto by the centre-right House of Freedoms coalition, which won also nationally, by a landslide. Forza Italia was the most voted party with 31.9%.

== Results ==
=== Chamber of Deputies ===
Coalition	Single-seat constituencies			Proportional system					Total
Coalition	votes	votes (%)	seats	Party	votes	votes (%)	seats	tot.	seats
House of Freedoms	1,454,877	47.3	30	Forza Italia	984,237	31.9	5	7	37
House of Freedoms	1,454,877	47.3	30	Lega Nord	309,809	10.1	-	7	37
House of Freedoms	1,454,877	47.3	30	National Alliance	260,596	8.5	2	7	37
House of Freedoms	1,454,877	47.3	30	CCD–CDU	100,582	3.3	-	7	37
House of Freedoms	1,454,877	47.3	30	New Italian Socialist Party	25,495	0.8	-	7	37
The Olive Tree	1,125,978	36.6	7	Democracy is Freedom – The Daisy	448,093	14.5	3	5	12
The Olive Tree	1,125,978	36.6	7	Democrats of the Left	328,734	10.7	2	5	12
The Olive Tree	1,125,978	36.6	7	Greens–Socialists	81,328	2.6	-	5	12
The Olive Tree	1,125,978	36.6	7	Party of Italian Communists	33,261	1.1	-	5	12
Liga Fronte Veneto	173,479	5.6	-	Liga Fronte Veneto	73,283	2.4	-	-	-
Italy of Values	143,476	4.7	-	Italy of Values	142,834	4.6	-	-	-
Communist Refoundation Party	-	-	-	Communist Refoundation Party	119,251	3.9	1	1	1
European Democracy	104,904	3.4	-	European Democracy	56,640	1.8	-	-	-
Bonino List	38,009	1.2	-	Bonino List	91,963	3.0	-	-	-
Others	37,707	1.2	-	others	25,998	0.9	-	-	-
Total coalitions	3,077,333	100.0	37	Total parties	3,073,699	100.0	13	13	50

Sources: Regional Council of Veneto and Ministry of the Interior

=== Senate ===
Coalition	Single-seat constituencies			PR	Total
Coalition	votes	votes (%)	seats	seats	seats
House of Freedoms	1,257,799	44.8	16	-	16
The Olive Tree	950,455	33.8	1	6	7
Liga Fronte Veneto	137,363	4.9	-	-	-
Italy of Values	112,336	4.0	-	-	-
Communist Refoundation Party	109,135	3.9	-	-	-
European Democracy	88,783	3.2	-	-	-
Bonino List	64,334	2.3	-	-	-
Va' pensiero Padania – Veneto	45,584	1.6	-	-	-
Tricolour Flame	42,408	1.5	-	-	-
Others	1,058	0.0	-	-	-
Total coalitions	2,821,258	100.0	17	6	23

Sources: Regional Council of Veneto and Ministry of the Interior
