= Christian Democracy Party =

Christian Democracy Party may refer to:

- Guatemalan Christian Democracy
- Party of Christian Democracy (Italy)
