= List of mayors of Benevento =

Mayor of Benevento
- Sindaco di Benevento

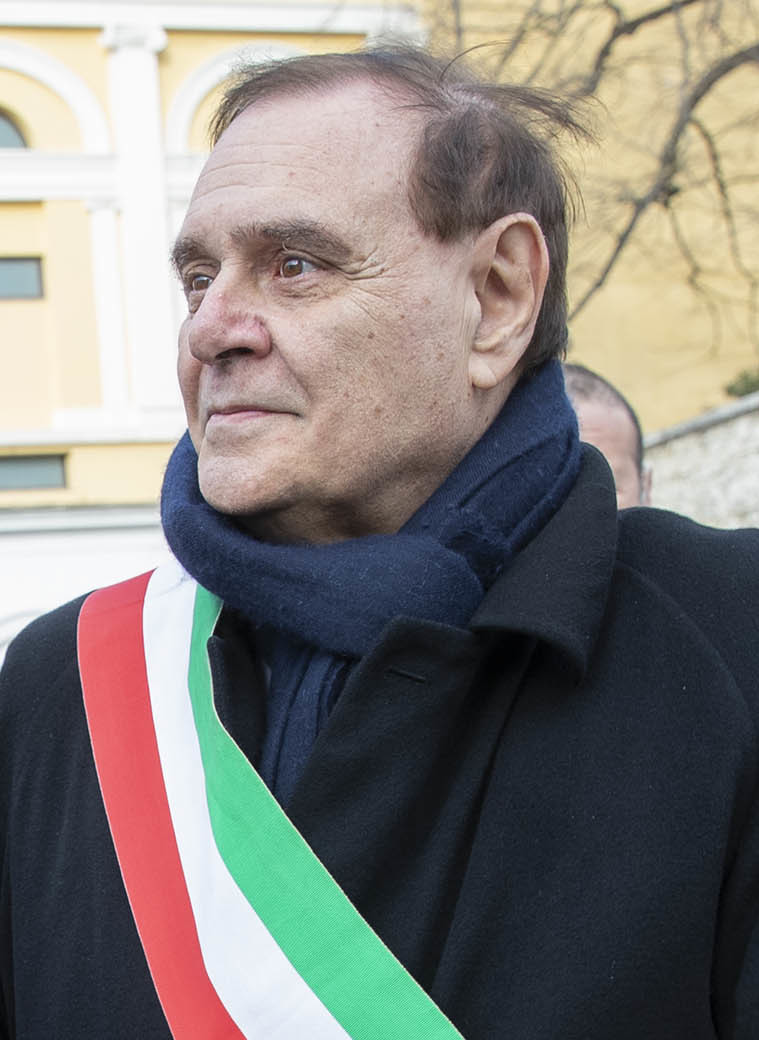
- Incumbent; Clemente Mastella since 20 June 2016
- Appointer: Popular election
- Term length: 5 years, renewable once
- Formation: January 1861
- Website: Official website

The mayor of Benevento is an elected politician who, along with the Benevento City Council, is accountable for the strategic government of Benevento in Campania, Italy.

The current mayor is Clemente Mastella, former minister of Justice and former minister of Labour, who took office on 20 June 2016.

== Overview ==
According to the Italian Constitution, the mayor of Benevento is member of the City Council.

The mayor is elected by the population of Benevento, who also elects the members of the City Council, controlling the mayor's policy guidelines and is able to enforce his resignation by a motion of no confidence. The mayor is entitled to appoint and release the members of his government.

Since 1993 the mayor is elected directly by Benevento's electorate: in all mayoral elections in Italy in cities with a population higher than 15,000 the voters express a direct choice for the mayor or an indirect choice voting for the party of the candidate's coalition. If no candidate receives at least 50% of votes, the top two candidates go to a second round after two weeks. The election of the City Council is based on a direct choice for the candidate with a preference vote: the candidate with the majority of the preferences is elected. The number of the seats for each party is determined proportionally.

== Italian Republic (since 1947) ==
=== City Council election (1947-1993) ===
From 1947 to 1993, the mayor of Benevento was elected by the City Council.

	Mayor	Term start	Term end	Party
1	Salvatore Pennella	7 January 1947	29 November 1949	DC
2	Vincenzo Cardone	19 December 1949	16 June 1952	PLI
3	Alfredo Zazo	16 June 1952	20 December 1952	PNM
4	Alberto Cangiano	27 December 1952	16 January 1954	MSI
5	Antonio Rivellini	6 March 1954	26 May 1955	PNM
6	Giuseppe D'Alessandro	31 May 1955	17 June 1956	MSI
7	Mario Rotili	17 June 1956	12 June 1963	DC
8	Ciriaco del Pozzo	12 June 1963	14 February 1965	DC
9	Pasquale Meomartini	14 February 1965	15 November 1967	DC
Special Prefectural Commissioner's tenure (15 November 1967 – 16 July 1970)
10	Lucio Facchiano	16 July 1970	18 November 1974	DC
11	Pasquale Columbro	18 November 1974	10 February 1977	DC
12	Ernesto Mazzoni	10 February 1977	19 June 1980	DC
13	Nicola Di Donato	12 November 1980	25 February 1982	DC
14	Antonio Pietrantonio	25 February 1982	28 November 1992	DC
15	Raffaele Verdicchio	28 November 1992	31 May 1993	DC
Special Prefectural Commissioner's tenure (31 May 1993 – 7 December 1993)

=== Direct election (since 1993) ===
Since 1993, under provisions of new local administration law, the mayor of Benevento is chosen by direct election, originally every four, then every five years.

	Mayor	Took office	Left office	Party	Coalition	Election
16	Pasquale Viespoli (b. 1955)	7 December 1993	23 May 1996 (Note: Reisgned.)	MSI	MSI	1993
Special Prefectural Commissioner's tenure (23 May 1996 – 3 December 1996)
(16)	Pasquale Viespoli (b. 1955)	3 December 1996	5 April 2001 (Note: Reisgned.)	AN	AN	1996
Special Prefectural Commissioner's tenure (5 April 2001 – 28 May 2001)
17	Sandro Nicola D'Alessandro (b. 1956)	28 May 2001	30 May 2006	AN	House of Freedoms (AN-FI-UDC)	2001
18	Fausto Pepe (b. 1963)	30 May 2006	16 May 2011	UDEUR; PD	The Union (DS-DL-UDEUR)	2006
18	Fausto Pepe (b. 1963)	16 May 2011	20 June 2016	UDEUR; PD	PD • IdV • ApI	2011
19	Clemente Mastella (b. 1947)	20 June 2016	21 October 2021	FI; NDC	FI • UDC and centrist lists	2016
19	Clemente Mastella (b. 1947)	21 October 2021 (Note: Election originally scheduled for June 2021 then postponed due to the COVID-19 pandemic.)	Incumbent	FI; NDC	NDC • IV and centrist lists	2021

== Bibliography ==
- Giovanni Fuccio; Mario Pedicini (1989). I Sindaci di Benevento. 1944-1988. Benevento: Realtà Sannita.
