= O bianco fiore =

O bianco fiore ("O White Flower") is a traditional anthem of Italian Christian workers and Christian Democracy.

== History ==
The anthem was written in 1906 by Dario Flori, a priest and supporter of trade union Catholics in Tuscany. The anthem was adopted by the Italian People's Party, "O bianco fiore" later became the official anthem of the Christian Democracy.

Others attribute the hymn to priest Amilcare Berzieri.

In 2000, an electoral alliance named "Biancofiore" was formed, which brought together the Christian Democratic Centre and United Christian Democrats parties (heirs to Christian Democracy) to contest the 2001 Italian general election.

Together, Francesco Cossiga and Pier Ferdinando Casini improvised a duet singing the hymn in 2009.
