= Europeanists =

Europeanists Europeisti
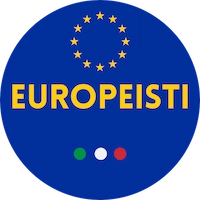
- President: Raffaele Fantetti
- Founded: 27 January 2021
- Headquarters: Via del Monte delle Capre 44/A, Rome
- Ideology: Liberalism; Pro-Europeanism
- Political position: Centre
- National affiliation: Italy in the Centre (2021–2022); Us of the Centre (since 2022)
- Chamber of Deputies: 0 / 400
- Senate: 0 / 200
- European Parliament: 0 / 76

Website
- europeisti.org

Europeanists (Italian: Europeisti) is a political party in Italy. Amid a government crisis triggered after Matteo Renzi announced that he would revoke Italia Viva's support to the government of Giuseppe Conte, Europeanists formed on 27 January 2021 as a component of a joint parliamentary group in the Italian Senate (together with MAIE and Democratic Centre), with the aim to support Conte's cabinet.

== History ==
On 18 January the government won the vote of confidence in the Chamber of Deputies with 321 votes in favour, 259 against and 27 abstentions. On the following day, the government won a vote of confidence in the Senate with 156 votes in favor, 140 against and 16 abstentions; however, the cabinet failed to reach the absolute majority in the house. Among those who voted in support of Conte in the Senate, there were members of the future Europeanists group, like the then-senators of Forza Italia (FI), Andrea Causin and Mariarosaria Rossi, as well as former members of the Five Star Movement (M5S), like Gregorio de Falco (who joined the Democratic Centre, a party led by Bruno Tabacci) and Maurizio Buccarella, and senators from the Associative Movement Italians Abroad (MAIE), like Ricardo Antonio Merlo and Raffaele Fantetti.

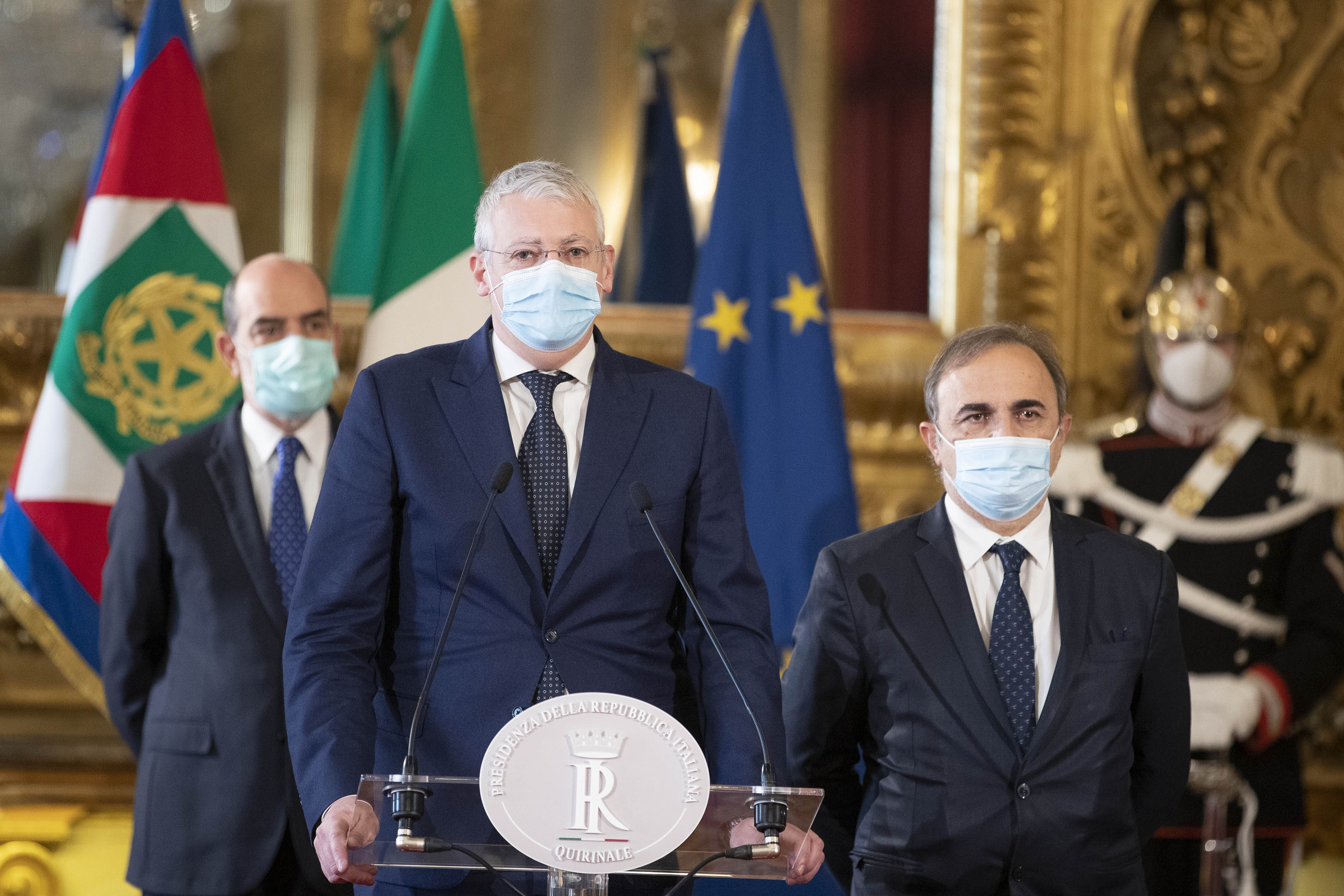
Andrea Causin and Ricardo Antonio Merlo at the consultations for the formation of a new government

On 26 January, Conte resigned as Prime Minister. On the following day, the Europeanists group was formed in the Italian Senate (together with MAIE and Democratic Centre) in support of Conte. The senator of the Democratic Party Tatjana Rojc joined Europeanists in order to allow the formation of the group, while remaining a member of the PD. Instead, Sandra Lonardo, a former senator of FI and wife of Clemente Mastella, who was among the main proponents of the parliamentary group, decided not to join, in contrast with the other members about the group's name (which did not include Lonardo's and Mastella's party name, Us Campanians). It was not possible to create a similar parliamentary group in the Chamber of Deputies, because only three deputies joined, so Europeanists had to form a sub-group within the Mixed Group, along with MAIE and PSI.

On 28 January, the group took part in the consultations with President Sergio Mattarella for the formation of a new cabinet, stressing its support to Conte. On the same day, Causin hinted the transformation of the group into a political party.

In late March, two senators, Tatjana Rojc and Mariarosaria Rossi, announced that they would soon leave the group. Consequently, on 29 March the group was dissolved due to lack of the minimum number of senators needed to form a parliamentary group (eight instead of ten).

Despite the dissolution of the group in each branch of the Parliament, the senators Fantetti and Rossi formed a parliamentary sub-group within the Senate's Mixed Group along with IDeA and Cambiamo!; moreover, Fantetti himself continued to preside over the "Europeanists" association, federated with Cambiamo!. On 28 October, the "IDeA – Cambiamo!" sub-group changed its name into "IDeA-Cambiamo-Europeanists". Since 2022 Europeanists has been part of the National Register of political parties.

== Election results ==
=== Italian Parliament ===
Election	Leader	Chamber of Deputies				Senate of the Republic				Government
Election	Leader	Votes	%	Seats	+/–	Votes	%	Seats	+/–	Government
2022	Raffaele Fantetti	46,109 (Note: In a joint list with Us of the Centre and Christian Democracy.)	0.16	0 / 400	New	42,860	0.16	0 / 200	New	No seats
