= Gino Giugni =

Italian academic and politician (1927–2009)

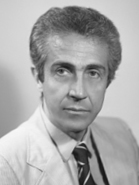

Minister of Labor and Social Security
- In office 28 April 1993 – 10 May 1994
- Prime Minister: Carlo Azeglio Ciampi
- Preceded by: Nino Cristofori
- Succeeded by: Clemente Mastella

Member of the Chamber of Deputies
- In office 14 April 1994 – 8 May 1996

Member of the Senate
- In office 12 July 1983 – 14 April 1994

Personal details
- Born: 1 August 1927 Genoa, Kingdom of Italy
- Died: 5 October 2009 (aged 82) Rome, Italy
- Party: PSI (until 1994); SI (1994-1996); DS (2000-2005); SDI (2005-2007); PD (2007-2009)
- Education: University of Genoa
- Profession: University professor

Gino Giugni (1 August 1927 – 5 October 2009) was an Italian academic and politician. He served as the minister of labour and social security in the period 1993–1994.

== Early life and education ==
Giugni was born in Genoa on 1 August 1927. He graduated from the University of Genoa in 1949 receiving a degree in law.

== Career ==
Giugni was an expert on labour law. He began his career as a professor at the University of Bari. In 1968 he and Tiziano Treu founded the Italian Industrial Relations Research Association. Giugni became the head of the national commission charged with drafting the workers' statute that passed in 1970. He served as the director of the legislative office of the ministry of labour in the early 1980s. He also contributed to the economic agreement dated 22 January 1983. The same year he became a member of the Italian senate, being a representative of the Italian Socialist Party. He was reelected to the senate in 1987.

From April 1993 to May 1994 Giugni served as the minister of labor and social security in the cabinet led by Prime Minister Carlo Azeglio Ciampi. From 1994 to 1996 he was a member of the Italian parliament for the Progressive Left. Following his retirement from politics he returned to his teaching post and taught labor law-related courses at Sapienza University of Rome and at LUISS. He also taught at the various universities, including Nanterre University, Paris University, UCLA, Buenos Aires University and Columbia University. He served as the president of the Italian Association of Labour Law and Safety. He was also a member of the Academy of Europe. He published articles in the Italian daily La Repubblica and the monthly Il Mulino.

=== Works ===
Giugni was one of the leading Italian scholars who developed connections between labour relations and sociology. He is the author of several books, including the following: Introduzione allo studio dell'autonomia collettiva (1960), Il sindacato fra contratti e riforme (1972), Lavoro, legge, contratti (1989) and L'intervista Fondata sul lavoro? (1994).

=== Assassination attempt ===
Giugni was wounded in the legs in an attack in Rome on 3 May 1983 when he was teaching at the university and serving as the director at the Ministry of Labour. The attack occurred after Giugni left his office at the university. Perpetrators, one man and a woman, have not been identified and arrested. A group linked to the Red Brigades claimed the responsibility of the attack.

== Death ==
Giugni died in Rome on 5 October 2009 after a long illness. He was 82.
