= Italy in the Centre =

Italian political party

Italy in the Centre Italia al Centro
- President: Giovanni Toti
- Founded: 28 April 2022; 4 years ago
- Dissolved: 21 May 2023; 3 years ago (de facto)
- Preceded by: Cambiamo!
- Merged into: Us Moderates
- Ideology: Liberal conservatism
- Political position: Centre to centre-right
- National affiliation: Party: Us Moderates (2022–2023); Coalition: Centre-right coalition
- Colours: Orange

Website
- www.italiaalcentro.org

Italy in the Centre (Italian: Italia al Centro, IaC) was a liberal-conservative political party in Italy led by Giovanni Toti.

== History ==
In August 2019, Giovanni Toti left his former party Forza Italia (FI), and formed Cambiamo! (C!). In May 2021, C! was a founding member of a new joint party named Coraggio Italia (CI), whose main leaders were Toti and Luigi Brugnaro, mayor of Venice.

In less than a year, CI, which had failed to attract substantial support among voters according to opinion polls, experienced an internal crisis. On one side Toti wanted to form an alliance with Matteo Renzi's Italia Viva party, and he launched Italy in the Centre (IaC); on the other side, Brugnaro rejected establishment politics, and he wanted to remain part of the centre-right coalition. In February 2022, CI's sub-group within the Mixed Group, previously named "IDeA–Cambiamo!–Europeanists", was re-named "Italy in the Centre". On 28 April 2022 IaC was officially established.

During a meeting of the national leadership in May 2022, a provisional statute of IaC was approved and regional coordinators and a secretariat were appointed, entirely supplanting Cambiamo!. Also in May, senators Francesco Mollame and Ugo Grassi joined IaC.

In the 2022 Italian local elections, CI and IaC ran separately in most places. CI obtained relevant results only in Veneto, Brugnaro's home-region, most notably 5.2% in Verona and 4.4% in Padua, while IaC won 9.2% in Genoa, 8.5% in La Spezia, 3.7% in Rieti, 5.2% in L'Aquila, and 4.3% in Catanzaro.

In late June 2022, CI and IaC formally split both in the Chamber of Deputies and the Senate.

In July 2022, there was a party's convention in Rome, featuring as guests, among others, Mariastella Gelmini of Forza Italia, Carlo Calenda of Action and Ettore Rosato of Italia Viva.

In the run-up of the 2022 general election, IaC first formed a joint list with Us with Italy (NcI), then it was a founding member of Us Moderates (NM), a broader joint list within the centre-right coalition, along with NcI, CI and the Union of the Centre (UdC).

== Composition ==
=== Member parties ===
Party	Main ideology	Leader
Cambiamo! (C!)	Liberal conservatism	Giovanni Toti
Identity and Action (IDeA)	Liberal conservatism	Gaetano Quagliariello
Vinciamo Italia (VI)	Liberal conservatism	Marco Marin

=== Former members ===
Party	Main ideology	Leader
Europeanists	Liberalism	Raffaele Fantetti
Us of the Centre (nDC)	Christian democracy	Clemente Mastella

== Election results ==
=== Italian Parliament ===
Election	Leader	Chamber of Deputies					Senate of the Republic				
Election	Leader	Votes	%	Seats	+/–	Position	Votes	%	Seats	+/–	Position
2022	Giovanni Toti	Into NM		2 / 400	New	12th	Into NM		0 / 200	New	13th

== Leadership ==
- President: Giovanni Toti (2022–2023)
