= 2001 Italian general election in Sardinia =

The Italian general election of 2001 took place on 13 May 2001.

The election was won in Sardinia by the centre-right House of Freedoms coalition, which won also nationally. Forza Italia was the most voted party with 30.2%.

== Results ==
=== Chamber of Deputies ===
Coalitions	Single-seat constituencies			Proportional system					Total
Coalitions	votes	votes (%)	seats	Parties	votes	votes (%)	seats	tot.	seats
House of Freedoms	449,633	45.2	9	Forza Italia	304,989	30.2	2	2	11
House of Freedoms	449,633	45.2	9	National Alliance	137,054	13.6	-	2	11
House of Freedoms	449,633	45.2	9	CCD-CDU	46,295	4.6	-	2	11
House of Freedoms	449,633	45.2	9	New Italian Socialist Party	10,590	1.1	-	2	11
The Olive Tree	431,798	43.4	5	Democrats of the Left	162,723	16.1	1	2	7
The Olive Tree	431,798	43.4	5	Democracy is Freedom – The Daisy	135,985	13.5	1	2	7
The Olive Tree	431,798	43.4	5	Party of Italian Communists	28,088	2.8	-	2	7
The Olive Tree	431,798	43.4	5	Greens–Socialists	17,255	1.7	-	2	7
Communist Refoundation Party	-	-	-	Communist Refoundation Party	47,699	4.7	-	-	-
Sardinian Action Party–Sardinia Nation	40,692	4.1	-	Sardinian Action Party–Sardinia Nation	34,412	3.4	-	-	-
Italy of Values	33,971	3.4	-	Italy of Values	33,375	3.3	-	-	-
European Democracy	14,776	1.5	-	European Democracy	19,335	1.9	-	-	-
Bonino List	12,213	1.2	-	Bonino List	17,930	1.8	-	-	-
Others	12,233	1.2	-	others	13,568	1.3	-	-	-
Total coalitions	995,316	100.0	14	Total parties	1,009,298	100.0	4	4	18

Source: Ministry of the Interior

=== Senate ===
Coalitions	Single-seat constituencies			Prop.	Total
Coalitions	votes	votes (%)	seats	seats	seats
House of Freedoms	413,098	45.1	4	1	5
The Olive Tree	369,025	40.3	2	2	4
Communist Refoundation Party	36,830	4.0	-	-	-
Sardinian Action Party–Sardinia Nation	32,822	3.6	-	-	-
Italy of Values	27,971	3.1	-	-	-
European Democracy	13,601	1.5	-	-	-
Bonino List	13,376	1.5	-	-	-
Others	9,203	1.0	-	-	-
Total coalitions	915,926	100.0	6	3	9

Source: Ministry of the Interior
