= Luigi Scotti =

Italian politician (born 1932)

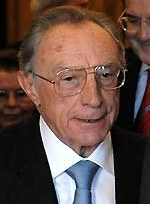

Minister of Justice
- In office 6 February 2008 – 8 May 2008
- Prime Minister: Romano Prodi
- Preceded by: Romano Prodi ad interim
- Succeeded by: Angelino Alfano

Personal details
- Born: 14 January 1932 (age 94) Naples, Kingdom of Italy
- Party: Independent

Luigi Scotti (born 14 January 1932) is an Italian former magistrate, politician and jurist. Between 6 February 2008 and 8 May 2008, he was minister of justice in Romano Prodi's government.

== Biography ==
=== Academic career ===
Graduated in law with honours from the University of Naples, Scotti benefited from one of the five scholarships for the best graduates in the academic year, with the adjoining role of volunteer assistant. In 1965, he passed the competition for ordinary assistant, and in 1967 he obtained free teaching in navigation law. In 1969, he was appointed professor at the Faculty of Economics and Commerce of the University of Naples. In 1971, he became professor in charge and was stabilised in 1986; he passed the competition for ordinary professor but did not exercise this profession, intending to remain in the judiciary. Subsequently, he carried out numerous postgraduate courses, especially in the field of the organisation of justice and the judiciary.

=== Judicial career ===
In 1962, Scotti was assigned to the magistrate's office of Calitri as a praetor. Appointed court magistrate in 1964, he continued his career within the judiciary, becoming judge in 1966 and appellate magistrate in 1972; thanks to this qualification, he was elected a member of the Superior Council of the Magistracy, of which he was a member from 1976 to 1981.

On 10 April 1979, he was appointed Magistrate of Cassation, and from November 1982 he worked at the Ministry of Justice first as deputy head of the Legislative Office, then from 1984 as head of the same office. At the same time, he was appointed regent of the General Directorate of the Judicial Organization and subsequently regent of the General Inspectorate, being appointed Magistrate of Cassation with higher managerial functions on 10 April 1987.

From 23 May 1997, he returned to the function of judge as president of the Court of Rome.

=== Political career ===
On 17 May 2006, he resigned from all his judicial positions as he was appointed Undersecretary of Justice in the second Prodi government, indicated by the Party of Italian Communists led by Oliviero Diliberto.

On 7 February 2008, he was appointed Minister of Justice in the Prodi II government that had already resigned, replacing Romano Prodi, who had taken over the interim after Clemente Mastella's resignation.

On 9 May 2008, the mayor of Naples, Rosa Russo Iervolino, appointed him Assessor for legal affairs, security and transparency.

== Bibliography ==
- (in Italian) Biografia di Luigi Scotti. Italian Ministry of Justice.
