= Sergio D'Antoni =

Italian politician (born 1946)

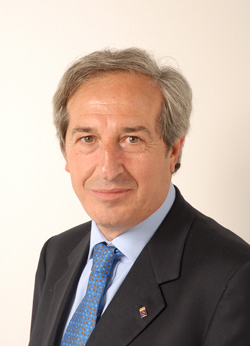

Secretary-General of the CISL
- In office 13 March 1991 – 9 June 2000
- Preceded by: Franco Marini
- Succeeded by: Savino Pezzotta

Member of the Chamber of Deputies
- In office 27 October 2004 – 14 March 2013

Personal details
- Born: 10 December 1946 (age 79) Caltanissetta, Italy
- Party: PD (since 2007)
- Other political affiliations: DE (2001–2002); UDC (2002–2004); DL (2004–2007)
- Profession: Syndicalist; Politician

Sergio Antonio D'Antoni (born 10 December 1946 in Caltanissetta) is an Italian politician, syndicalist and sports manager, President of CONI Sicilia from 2014 to 2025.

== Biography ==
Graduated in law, D'Antoni became a researcher at the University of Palermo. He joined the Italian Confederation of Workers' Trade Unions (CISL) in the early 1970s, becoming finally its General Secretary in 1991. He remained leader of the CISL until 2000, furthermore he has been member of the National Council for Economics and Labour (CNEL) from 1991 to 1999.

In 2001 D'Antoni founded a new centrist party, European Democracy, that elected two senators in the Italian general election of the same year. Still in 2001, he was a candidate in the Sicilian regional election, getting the 5% of the votes.

In 2002 he joined the Union of Christian and Centre Democrats, becoming its Deputy Secretary; but, in 2004, he left the UDC to join Democracy is Freedom – The Daisy, led by Francesco Rutelli. In 2004 he was elected to the Chamber of Deputies in the supplementary election in the vacant Napoli-Ischia district (after the election of Alessandra Mussolini as MEP), supported by The Olive Tree. In the 2006 Italian general election he was re-elected to the Chamber of Deputies and he became Vice-Minister for Economic Development in the Prodi II Cabinet.

He was re-elected deputy with the Democratic Party in the 2008 general election.

He has been executive of Virtus Roma, president of Lega Basket from 2000 to 2001 and President of the Palermo football club from 2000 to 2002. In June 2014 he was elected President of CONI Sicilia.
