= Lorenzo Acquarone =

Italian lawyer and politician (1931–2020)

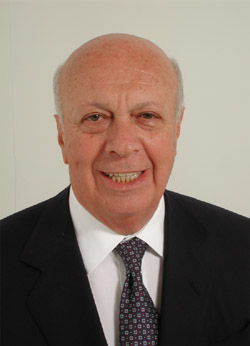

Member of the Chamber of Deputies
- In office 14 April 1994 – 27 April 2006
- Constituency: Liguria

Member of the Senate
- In office 2 July 1987 – 14 April 1994
- Constituency: Liguria

Personal details
- Born: 25 February 1931 Ventimiglia, Imperia, Italy
- Died: 24 March 2020 (aged 89) Genoa, Italy
- Cause of death: COVID-19
- Party: DC (till 1994); PPI (1994-2002); The Daisy (2002-2003); UDEUR (2003-2006)
- Education: University of Genoa
- Occupation: Lawyer, academic, politician

Lorenzo Acquarone (25 February 1931 – 24 March 2020) was an Italian lawyer and politician.

== Biography ==
Born in Ventimiglia on February 25, 1931, Acquarone graduated in law and became a lawyer. He would go on to become a Professor in 1961, and from 1966 to 2006 was a faculty member of the University of Genoa.

Acquarone entered politics as a member of the Christian Democrats, as a Senator in the Italian Senate between 1987 and 1994. Following his career in the Senate, he became a leader of the Italian People's Party with whom he was elected to the Chamber of Deputies, where he served from 1994 to 2006. In 2002 he participated in the formation of the new political entity called the "Margherita" or Democracy is Freedom - The Daisy, but in September 2003 decided to leave the party to join the Popular-UDEUR.

Acquarone died at the age of 89 on March 24, 2020, due to COVID-19, during the COVID-19 pandemic in Italy.

== Honors ==
Date	Country	Decoration
6 October 1978	Italy	Commander of the Order of Merit of the Italian Republic
1 June 2007	Italy	Italian Medal of Merit for Culture and Art
12 December 2007	Italy	Knight of the Grand Cross of the Order of Merit of the Italian Republic
