= Second Prodi government =

59th government of the Italian Republic

Prodi II Cabinet
- 59th Cabinet of Italy

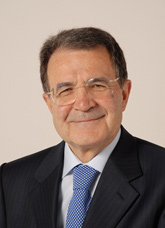
- Date formed: 17 May 2006
- Date dissolved: 8 May 2008 (723 days)

People and organisations
- Head of state: Giorgio Napolitano
- Head of government: Romano Prodi
- No. of ministers: 26 (incl. Prime Minister)
- Ministers removed: 1 resigned
- Total no. of members: 27 (incl. Prime Minister)
- Member party: The Union (DS, DL, PRC, RNP, IdV, PdCI, FdV, UDEUR)
- Status in legislature: Majority (coalition)
- Opposition parties: House of Freedoms (FI, AN, UDC, LN)
- Opposition leader: Silvio Berlusconi

History
- Election: 2006 election
- Outgoing election: 2008 election
- Legislature term: XV Legislature (2006 – 2008)
- Predecessor: Berlusconi III Cabinet
- Successor: Berlusconi IV Cabinet

The second Prodi government was the cabinet of the government of Italy from 17 May 2006 to 8 May 2008, a total of 722 days, or 1 year, 11 months and 21 days. The 59th cabinet of the Italian Republic, it was the only cabinet of the XV Legislature.

It was composed of 24 ministers, 10 deputy-ministers and 66 under-secretaries, for a total of 102 members.

This was the first government of the Republic in which the Communist Refoundation Party and the Italian Radicals participated directly, and the first government supported by the entire parliamentary left wing since the De Gasperi III Cabinet in 1947.

== Formation ==
Romano Prodi led his coalition to the electoral campaign preceding the election, eventually won by a very narrow margin of 25,000 votes, and a final majority of two seats in the Senate, on 10 April. Prodi's appointment was somewhat delayed, as the outgoing President of the Republic, Carlo Azeglio Ciampi, ended his mandate in May, not having enough time for the usual procedure (consultations made by the President, appointment of a Prime Minister, motion of confidence and oath of office). After the acrimonious election of Giorgio Napolitano to replace Ciampi, Prodi could proceed with his transition to government. On 16 May he was invited by Napolitano to form a government. The following day, 17 May 2006, Prodi and his second cabinet were sworn into office.

Romano Prodi obtained the support for his cabinet on 19 May at the Senate and on 23 May at the Chamber of Deputies. Also on 18 May, Prodi laid out some sense of his new foreign policy when he pledged to withdraw Italian troops from Iraq and called the Iraq War a "grave mistake that has not solved but increased the problem of security".

== First crisis ==
The coalition led by Romano Prodi, thanks to the electoral law which gave the winner a sixty-seat majority, can count on a good majority in the Chamber of Deputies but only on a very narrow majority in the Senate. The composition of the coalition was heterogeneous, combining parties of communist ideology, the Party of Italian Communists and Communist Refoundation Party, within the same government as parties of Catholic inspiration, The Daisy and UDEUR. The latter was led by Clemente Mastella, former chairman of Christian Democracy. Therefore, according to critics, it was difficult to have a single policy in different key areas, such as economics and foreign politics (for instance, Italian military presence in Afghanistan). In his earlier months as PM, Prodi had a key role in the creation of a multinational peacekeeping force in Lebanon following the 2006 Israel-Lebanon conflict.

Prodi's government faced a crisis over policies in early 2007, after just nine months of government. Three ministers in Prodi's Cabinet boycotted a vote in January to continue funding for Italian troop deployments in Afghanistan. Lawmakers approved the expansion of the US military base Caserma Ederle at the end of January, but the victory was so narrow that Deputy Prime Minister Francesco Rutelli criticised members of the coalition who had not supported the government. At around the same time, Justice Minister Clemente Mastella, of the coalition member UDEUR, said he would rather see the government fall than support its unwed couples legislation.

Tens of thousands of people marched in Vicenza against the expansion of Caserma Ederle, which saw the participation of some leading far-left members of the government. Harsh debates followed in the Italian Senate on 20 February 2007. Deputy Prime Minister and Foreign Affairs Minister Massimo D'Alema declared during an official visit in Ibiza, Spain that, without a majority on foreign policy affairs, the government would resign. The following day, D'Alema gave a speech at the Senate representing the government, clarifying his foreign policy and asking the Senate to vote for or against it. In spite of the fear of some senators that Prodi's defeat would return Silvio Berlusconi to power, the Senate did not approve a motion backing Prodi's government foreign policy, two votes shy of the required majority of 160.

After a Government meeting on 21 February, Romano Prodi tendered his resignation to the President Giorgio Napolitano, who cut short an official visit to Bologna in order to receive the Prime Minister. Prodi's spokesman indicated that he would only agree to form a new Government "if, and only if, he is guaranteed the full support of all the parties in the majority from now on". On 22 February, centre-left coalition party leaders backed a non-negotiable list of twelve political conditions given by Prodi as conditions of his remaining in office. President Napolitano held talks with political leaders on 23 February to decide whether to confirm Prodi's Government, ask Prodi to form a new government or call fresh elections.

Following these talks, on 24 February, President Napolitano asked Prodi to remain in office but to submit to a vote of confidence in both houses. On 28 February, the Senate voted to grant confidence to Prodi's Government. Though facing strong opposition from the centre-right coalition, the vote resulted in a 162–157 victory. Prodi then faced a vote of confidence in the lower house on 2 March, which he won as expected with a large majority of 342–198.

On 14 October 2007, Prodi oversaw the merger of two main parties of the Italian centre-left, Democrats of the Left and The Daisy, creating the Democratic Party. Prodi himself led the merger of the two parties, which had been planned over a twelve-year period, and became the first President of the party. He announced his resignation from that post on 16 April 2008, two days after the Democratic Party's defeat in the general election.

== Fall ==
On 24 January 2008 Prime Minister of Italy Romano Prodi lost a vote of confidence in the Senate by a vote of 161 to 156 with one abstention, causing the downfall of his government. Prodi's resignation led President Giorgio Napolitano to request the President of the Senate, Franco Marini, to assess the possibility to form a caretaker government. The other possibility would have been to call for early elections immediately. Marini acknowledged impossibility to form an interim government due to the unavailability of the centre-right parties, and early elections were scheduled for 13 and 14 April 2008.

== Investiture votes ==
19–23 May 2006 Investiture votes for Prodi II Cabinet
House of Parliament	Vote	Parties	Votes
Senate of the Republic	Yes	The Olive Tree, PRC, Together with the Union, IdV, SVP–PATT–ALD, UDEUR, PDM, Others	165 / 320
Senate of the Republic	No	FI, AN, UDC, LN, DCA, MpA	155 / 320
Chamber of Deputies	Yes	The Olive Tree, PRC, IdV, RnP, PdCI, FdV, UDEUR (14), SVP–PATT–ALD, Others	344 / 612
Chamber of Deputies	No	FI, AN, UDC, LN, DCA-NPSI, MpA	268 / 612

== Party breakdown ==
=== Beginning of term ===
==== Ministers ====
- Democrats of the Left
9
- Democracy is Freedom – The Daisy
8
- Independents
2
- Communist Refoundation Party
1
- Rose in the Fist
1
- Italy of Values
1
- Party of Italian Communists
1
- Federation of the Greens
1
- Union of Democrats for Europe
1

==== Ministers and other members ====
- Independents (Olive Tree area): Prime minister, 1 minister, 4 undersecretaries
- Democrats of the Left (DS): 9 ministers, 5 deputy ministers, 23 undersecretaries
- Democracy is Freedom – The Daisy (DL): 8 ministers, 3 deputy ministers, 18 undersecretaries
- Communist Refoundation Party (PRC): 1 minister, 1 deputy minister, 6 undersecretaries
- Rose in the Fist (RnP): 1 minister, 1 deputy minister, 3 undersecretaries
  - Italian Radicals (RI): 1 minister
  - Italian Democratic Socialists (SDI): 1 deputy minister, 3 undersecretaries
- Italy of Values (IdV): 1 minister, 2 undersecretaries
- Independents (PdCI area): 1 minister, 2 undersecretaries
- Federation of the Greens (FdV): 1 minister, 2 undersecretaries
- Independents: 1 ministers, 6 undersecretaries
- Union of Democrats for Europe (UDEUR): 1 minister, 2 undersecretaries
- Lega per l'Autonomia – Alleanza Lombarda (LAL): 1 undersecretary
- The Socialists: 1 undersecretary
- United Democratic Christians (DCU): 1 undersecretary

=== End of term ===
==== Ministers ====
- Democratic Party
19
- Independents
2
- Communist Refoundation Party
1
- Democratic Left
1
- Federation of the Greens
1
- Italy of Values
1
- Italian Radicals
1

==== Ministers and other members ====
- Democratic Party (PD): Prime minister, 18 ministers, 8 deputy ministers, 40 undersecretaries
- Communist Refoundation Party (PRC): 1 minister, 1 deputy minister, 6 undersecretaries
- Democratic Left (SD): 1 minister, 3 undersecretaries
- Federation of the Greens (FdV): 1 minister, 2 undersecretaries
- Italy of Values (IdV): 1 minister, 2 undersecretaries
- Independents: 1 ministers, 2 undersecretaries
- Independents (PdCI area): 1 minister, 1 undersecretary
- Italian Radicals (RI): 1 minister
- Socialist Party (PS): 1 deputy minister, 3 undersecretaries
- Lega per l'Autonomia – Alleanza Lombarda (LAL): 1 undersecretary
- The Italian Socialists (SI): 1 undersecretary
- United Democratic Christians (DCU): 1 undersecretary

== Council of Ministers ==
Office	Name	Party	Term
Prime Minister	Romano Prodi	Ind. / PD	2006–2008
Deputy Prime Minister	Massimo D'Alema	DS / PD	2006–2008
Deputy Prime Minister	Francesco Rutelli	DL / PD	2006–2008
Minister of Foreign Affairs	Massimo D'Alema	DS / PD	2006–2008
Minister of the Interior	Giuliano Amato	Ind. / PD	2006–2008
Minister of Justice	Clemente Mastella	UDEUR	2006–2008
Minister of Justice	Romano Prodi (ad interim)	PD	2008
Minister of Justice	Luigi Scotti	Ind.	2008
Minister of Economy and Finance	Tommaso Padoa-Schioppa	Ind.	2006–2008
Minister of Economic Development	Pier Luigi Bersani	DS / PD	2006–2008
Minister of University and Research	Fabio Mussi	DS / SD	2006–2008
Minister of Public Education	Giuseppe Fioroni	DL / PD	2006–2008
Minister of European Affairs and International Trade	Emma Bonino	RnP	2006–2008
Minister of Labour and Social Security	Cesare Damiano	DS / PD	2006–2008
Minister of Social Solidarity	Paolo Ferrero	PRC	2006–2008
Minister of Defence	Arturo Parisi	DL / PD	2006–2008
Minister of Agricultural, Food and Forestry Policies	Paolo De Castro	DL / PD	2006–2008
Minister of the Environment	Alfonso Pecoraro Scanio	FdV	2006–2008
Minister of Infrastructure	Antonio Di Pietro	IdV	2006–2008
Minister of Transport	Alessandro Bianchi	PdCI	2006–2008
Minister of Health	Livia Turco	DS / PD	2006–2008
Minister of Cultural Heritage and Activities	Francesco Rutelli	DL / PD	2006–2008
Minister of Communications	Paolo Gentiloni	DL / PD	2006–2008
Minister of Regional Affairs	Linda Lanzillotta	DL / PD	2006–2008
Minister for the Implementation of the Government Program	Giulio Santagata	DL / PD	2006–2008
Minister of Public Administration	Luigi Nicolais	DS / PD	2006–2008
Minister for Equal Opportunities	Barbara Pollastrini	DS / PD	2006–2008
Minister for Parliamentary Relations and Institutional Reforms	Vannino Chiti	DS / PD	2006–2008
Minister for Family	Rosy Bindi	DL / PD	2006–2008
Minister of Youth Policies and Sport	Giovanna Melandri	DS / PD	2006–2008
Secretary of the Council of Ministers	Enrico Letta	DL / PD	2006–2008

== Composition ==
Office	Portrait	Name	Term of office	Party
Prime Minister		Romano Prodi	17 May 2006 – 8 May 2008	Independent (Note: Member of The Olive Tree); Before 14 October 2007
Prime Minister		Romano Prodi	17 May 2006 – 8 May 2008	Democratic Party; After 14 October 2007
Prime Minister	Undersecretaries: Enrico Luigi Micheli (DL; after 14 October 2007: PD) – Delegated to the Security of the Republic; Fabio Gobbo (Ind.) – Delegated to the CIPE and Supervision of the Economical Affairs for the Presidency of the Council (until 6 April 2008); Ricardo Franco Levi (DL; after 14 October 2007: PD) – Delegated to Information, Communications and Publishing			
Deputy Prime Minister		Massimo D'Alema	17 May 2006 – 8 May 2008	Democrats of the Left; Before 14 October 2007
Deputy Prime Minister		Massimo D'Alema	17 May 2006 – 8 May 2008	Democratic Party; After 14 October 2007
Deputy Prime Minister		Francesco Rutelli	17 May 2006 – 8 May 2008	The Daisy; Before 14 October 2007
Deputy Prime Minister		Francesco Rutelli	17 May 2006 – 8 May 2008	Democratic Party; After 14 October 2007
Minister of Foreign Affairs		Massimo D'Alema	17 May 2006 – 8 May 2008	Democrats of the Left; Before 14 October 2007
Minister of Foreign Affairs		Massimo D'Alema	17 May 2006 – 8 May 2008	Democratic Party; After 14 October 2007
Minister of Foreign Affairs	Deputy Ministers: Ugo Intini (SDI; after 5 October 2007: PS); Patrizia Sentinelli (PRC); Franco Danieli (DL; after 14 October 2007: PD); Undersecretaries: Famiano Crucianelli (DS; after 5 May 2007: SD); Donato Di Santo (DS; after 14 October 2007: PD); Gianni Vernetti (DL; after 14 October 2007: PD); Bobo Craxi (SI)			
Minister of the Interior		Giuliano Amato	17 May 2006 – 8 May 2008	Independent; Before 14 October 2007
Minister of the Interior		Giuliano Amato	17 May 2006 – 8 May 2008	Democratic Party; After 14 October 2007
Minister of the Interior	Deputy Minister: Marco Minniti (DS; after 14 October 2007: PD); Undersecretaries: Marcella Lucidi (DS; after 14 October 2007: PD); Ettore Rosato (DL; after 14 October 2007: PD); Alessandro Pajno (Ind.); Franco Bonato (PRC)	Giuliano Amato	17 May 2006 – 8 May 2008	
Minister of Justice		Clemente Mastella	17 May 2006 – 17 January 2008	Union of Democrats for Europe
Minister of Justice	Romano Prodi (Acting)		17 January 2008 – 7 February 2008	Democratic Party
Minister of Justice		Luigi Scotti	7 February 2008 – 8 May 2008	Independent
Minister of Justice	Undersecretaries: Luigi Manconi (DS; after 14 October 2007: PD); Alberto Maritati (DS; after 14 October 2007: PD); Daniela Melchiorre (DL; after 1 October 2007: LD) (until 11 March 2008); Luigi Scotti (Ind.) (until 6 February 2008); Luigi Li Gotti (IdV)			
Minister of Defence		Arturo Parisi	17 May 2006 – 8 May 2008	The Daisy; Before 14 October 2007
Minister of Defence		Arturo Parisi	17 May 2006 – 8 May 2008	Democratic Party; After 14 October 2007
Minister of Defence	Undersecretaries: Lorenzo Forcieri (DL; after 14 October 2007: PD); Emidio Casula (SDI; after 5 October 2007: PS); Marco Verzaschi (UDEUR) (until 7 December 2007)			
Minister of Economy and Finance		Tommaso Padoa-Schioppa	17 May 2006 – 8 May 2008	Independent
Minister of Economy and Finance	Deputy Ministers: Vincenzo Visco (DS; after 14 October 2007: PD); Roberto Pinza (DL; after 14 October 2007: PD); Undersecretaries: Massimo Tononi (Ind.); Paolo Cento (FdV); Mario Lettieri (DL; after 14 October 2007: PD); Alfiero Grandi (DS; after 5 May 2007: SD); Antonangelo Casula (DS; after 14 October 2007: PD); Nicola Sartor (Ind.)			
Minister of Economic Development		Pier Luigi Bersani	17 May 2006 – 8 May 2008	Democrats of the Left; Before 14 October 2007
Minister of Economic Development		Pier Luigi Bersani	17 May 2006 – 8 May 2008	Democratic Party; After 14 October 2007
Minister of Economic Development	Deputy Minister: Sergio D'Antoni (DL; after 14 October 2007: PD); Undersecretaries: Filippo Bubbico (DS; after 14 October 2007: PD); Alfonso Gianni (PRC); Paolo Giaretta (DL) (until 24 April 2007); Marco Stradiotto (DL; after 14 October 2007: PD) (since 24 April 2007)			
Minister of Agricultural, Food and Forestry Policies		Paolo De Castro	17 May 2006 – 8 May 2008	The Daisy; Before 14 October 2007
Minister of Agricultural, Food and Forestry Policies		Paolo De Castro	17 May 2006 – 8 May 2008	Democratic Party; After 14 October 2007
Minister of Agricultural, Food and Forestry Policies	Undersecretaries: Guido Tampieri (DS; after 14 October 2007: PD); Stefano Boco (FdV); Giovanni Mongiello (DCU)			
Minister of the Environment		Alfonso Pecoraro Scanio	17 May 2006 – 8 May 2008	Federation of the Greens
Minister of the Environment	Undersecretaries: Gianni Piatti (DS; after 14 October 2007: PD); Bruno Dettori (DL; after 14 October 2007: PD); Laura Marchetti (PRC)			
Minister of Infrastructure		Antonio Di Pietro	17 May 2006 – 8 May 2008	Italy of Values
Minister of Infrastructure	Deputy Minister: Angelo Capodicasa (DS; after 14 October 2007: PD); Undersecretaries: Luigi Meduri (DL; after 14 October 2007: PD); Tommaso Casillo (SDI; after 5 October 2007: PS)			
Minister of Transport		Alessandro Bianchi	17 May 2006 – 8 May 2008	Party of Italian Communists
Minister of Transport	Deputy Minister: Cesare De Piccoli (DS; after 14 October 2007: PD); Undersecretaries: Andrea Annunziata (DL; after 14 October 2007: PD); Raffaele Gentile (SDI; after 5 October 2007: PS)			
Minister of Labour and Social Security		Cesare Damiano	17 May 2006 – 8 May 2008	Democrats of the Left; Before 14 October 2007
Minister of Labour and Social Security		Cesare Damiano	17 May 2006 – 8 May 2008	Democratic Party; After 14 October 2007
Minister of Labour and Social Security	Undersecretaries: Antonio Montagnino (DL; after 14 October 2007: PD); Rosa Rinaldi (PRC)			
Minister of Public Education		Giuseppe Fioroni	17 May 2006 – 8 May 2008	The Daisy; Before 14 October 2007
Minister of Public Education		Giuseppe Fioroni	17 May 2006 – 8 May 2008	Democratic Party; After 14 October 2007
Minister of Public Education	Deputy Minister: Mariangela Bastico (DS; after 14 October 2007: PD); Undersecretaries: Gaetano Pascarella (DS; after 14 October 2007: PD); Letizia De Torre (DL; after 14 October 2007: PD)			
Minister of University and Research		Fabio Mussi	17 May 2006 – 8 May 2008	Democrats of the Left; Before 5 May 2007
Minister of University and Research		Fabio Mussi	17 May 2006 – 8 May 2008	Democratic Left; After 5 May 2007
Minister of University and Research	Undersecretaries: Luciano Modica (DS; after 14 October 2007: PD); Nando Dalla Chiesa (DL; after 14 October 2007: PD)			
Minister of Cultural Heritage and Activities		Francesco Rutelli	17 May 2006 – 8 May 2008	The Daisy; Before 14 October 2007
Minister of Cultural Heritage and Activities		Francesco Rutelli	17 May 2006 – 8 May 2008	Democratic Party; After 14 October 2007
Minister of Cultural Heritage and Activities	Undersecretaries: Elena Montecchi (DS; after 14 October 2007: PD); Andrea Marcucci (DL; after 14 October 2007: PD); Danielle Mazzonis (PRC)			
Minister of Health		Livia Turco	17 May 2006 – 8 May 2008	Democrats of the Left; Before 14 October 2007
Minister of Health		Livia Turco	17 May 2006 – 8 May 2008	Democratic Party; After 14 October 2007
Minister of Health	Undersecretaries: Serafino Zucchelli (DS; after 14 October 2007: PD); Antonio Gaglione (DL; after 14 October 2007: PD); Gian Paolo Patta (Ind.)			
Minister of Communications		Paolo Gentiloni	17 May 2006 – 8 May 2008	The Daisy; Before 14 October 2007
Minister of Communications		Paolo Gentiloni	17 May 2006 – 8 May 2008	Democratic Party; After 14 October 2007
Minister of Communications	Undersecretaries: Luigi Vimercati (DS; after 14 October 2007: PD); Giorgio Calò (IdV)			
Minister of International Trade		Emma Bonino	17 May 2006 – 8 May 2008	Italian Radicals
Minister of International Trade	Undersecretaries: Mauro Agostini (DS; after 14 October 2007: PD); Miloš Budin (DS; after 14 October 2007: PD)			
Minister of Social Solidarity		Paolo Ferrero	17 May 2006 – 8 May 2008	Communist Refoundation Party
Minister of Social Solidarity	Undersecretaries: Franca Donaggio (DS; after 14 October 2007: PD); Cristina De Luca (DL; after 14 October 2007: PD)			
Minister for Parliamentary Relations (without portfolio)		Vannino Chiti	17 May 2006 – 8 May 2008	Democrats of the Left; Before 14 October 2007
Minister for Parliamentary Relations (without portfolio)		Vannino Chiti	17 May 2006 – 8 May 2008	Democratic Party; After 14 October 2007
Minister for Parliamentary Relations (without portfolio)	Undersecretaries: Giampaolo D'Andrea (DL; after 14 October 2007: PD); Paolo Naccarato (Ind.)			
Minister of Public Administration (without portfolio)		Luigi Nicolais	17 May 2006 – 8 May 2008	Democrats of the Left; Before 14 October 2007
Minister of Public Administration (without portfolio)		Luigi Nicolais	17 May 2006 – 8 May 2008	Democratic Party; After 14 October 2007
Minister of Public Administration (without portfolio)	Undersecretaries: Beatrice Magnolfi (DS; after 14 October 2007: PD); Giampiero Scanu (DL; after 14 October 2007: PD)			
Minister of Regional Affairs (without portfolio)		Linda Lanzillotta	17 May 2006 – 8 May 2008	The Daisy; Before 14 October 2007
Minister of Regional Affairs (without portfolio)		Linda Lanzillotta	17 May 2006 – 8 May 2008	Democratic Party; After 14 October 2007
Minister of Regional Affairs (without portfolio)	Undersecretary: Pietro Colonnella (DS; after 14 October 2007: PD)			
Minister for Equal Opportunities (without portfolio)		Barbara Pollastrini	17 May 2006 – 8 May 2008	Democrats of the Left; Before 14 October 2007
Minister for Equal Opportunities (without portfolio)		Barbara Pollastrini	17 May 2006 – 8 May 2008	Democratic Party; After 14 October 2007
Minister for Equal Opportunities (without portfolio)	Undersecretary: Donatella Linguiti (PRC)			
Minister of European Affairs (without portfolio)		Emma Bonino	17 May 2006 – 8 May 2008	Italian Radicals
Minister for Youth Policies and Sport (without portfolio)		Giovanna Melandri	17 May 2006 – 8 May 2008	Democrats of the Left; Before 14 October 2007
Minister for Youth Policies and Sport (without portfolio)		Giovanna Melandri	17 May 2006 – 8 May 2008	Democratic Party; After 14 October 2007
Minister for Youth Policies and Sport (without portfolio)	Undersecretaries: Giovanni Lolli (DS; after 14 October 2007: PD); Elidio De Paoli (LAL)			
Minister for Family (without portfolio)		Rosy Bindi	17 May 2006 – 8 May 2008	The Daisy; Before 14 October 2007
Minister for Family (without portfolio)		Rosy Bindi	17 May 2006 – 8 May 2008	Democratic Party; After 14 October 2007
Minister for Family (without portfolio)	Undersecretary: Chiara Acciarini (DS; after 5 May 2007: SD)			
Minister for the Implementation of the Government Program (without portfolio)		Giulio Santagata	17 May 2006 – 8 May 2008	The Daisy; Before 14 October 2007
Minister for the Implementation of the Government Program (without portfolio)		Giulio Santagata	17 May 2006 – 8 May 2008	Democratic Party; After 14 October 2007
Secretary of the Council of Ministers		Enrico Letta	17 May 2006 – 8 May 2008	The Daisy; Before 14 October 2007
Secretary of the Council of Ministers		Enrico Letta	17 May 2006 – 8 May 2008	Democratic Party; After 14 October 2007

== Sources ==
- Italian Government - Prodi II Cabinet
