= White Flower =

Logo of the list

The White Flower (Italian: Biancofiore) was an informal name given to the electoral alliance of two Christian democratic Italian political parties for the 2001 general election, namely:

- Christian Democratic Centre
- United Christian Democrats

The alliance's name came from "O bianco fiore", the party anthem of Christian Democracy. The parties aligned themselves with the House of Freedoms centre-right coalition. It was led by Pier Ferdinando Casini. The list gained only 3.2% of the vote, short of the 4% threshold however, thanks to its alliance with the House of Freedoms, it gained 40 Deputies and 29 Senators.

In December 2002 both constituent parties merged with European Democracy to form the Union of Christian and Centre Democrats (UDC).
