= Christian Democrats for the Republic =

Centrist party in Italy (1998)

Christian Democrats for the Republic Cristiano Democratici per la Repubblica
- Abbreviation: CDR
- President: Salvatore Cardinale
- Secretary: Clemente Mastella
- Founded: 7 February 1998
- Dissolved: 5 March 1998
- Split from: Christian Democratic Centre
- Merged into: Democratic Union for the Republic
- Ideology: Centrism; Christian democracy
- Political position: Centre
- Chamber of Deputies: 18 / 630
- Senate: 5 / 315

The Christian Democrats for the Republic (Italian: Cristiano Democratici per la Repubblica, CDR) was a short-lived centrist and Christian democratic political party in Italy.

The CDR was formed on 5 March 1998 as a splinter group from the Christian Democratic Centre (CCD) under the leadership of Clemente Mastella, until then CCD president. In June 1998, the CDR joined Francesco Cossiga, the United Christian Democrats (CDU) of Rocco Buttiglione, the Segni Pact of Mario Segni, the Liberal Party of Stefano De Luca, and some splinters from Forza Italia, National Alliance, and Lega Nord to form the Democratic Union for the Republic (UDR).

The CDR was dissolved on 2 July 1998 after the day prior the National Council of the CDR instructed its secretary to "define all the political and organizational steps necessary for the birth of the UDR", which was thus born the following day and entrusted its secretariat to Mastella. On 23 May 1999, after clashes between Mastella and Cossiga, the core of the former CDR launched the Union of Democrats for Europe (UDEur).
