= Bruno Storti =

Italian politician (1913 – 1994)

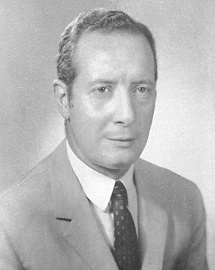
Storti, date unknown

Bruno Storti (9 July 1913 – 10 January 1994) was an Italian trade unionist and politician.

Born in Rome, Storti studied law at the University of Rome before becoming a civil servant. He was one of the leading founders of the Ministry of Defence staff union, then became the national secretary of the National State Federation. This was affiliated to the Italian General Confederation of Labour (CGIL), and Storti was elected to serve on its executive.

Storti was a religious Catholic, and in 1948, he left the CGIL to become deputy general secretary of a new Catholic workers' trade union federation. In 1950, this became part of the Italian Confederation of Workers' Trade Unions (CISL), with Storti becoming its assistant general secretary in 1954, and then general secretary in 1958.

The CISL was affiliated with the International Confederation of Free Trade Unions (ICFTU), and in 1959, Storti was elected to its executive committee. In 1965, he became president of the ICFTU, serving until 1972.

Storti was a member of the Christian Democracy, and in 1958, he was elected as a deputy for Rome. From 1959, he also served as a Member of the European Parliament, and on the International Labour Organization's Workers' Group.

Storti retired as leader of the CISL in 1977, and became president of the National Council for Economics and Labour, serving until 1989.

Trade union offices
Preceded by Giulio Pastore	General Secretary of the Italian Confederation of Workers' Trade Unions; 1958–1977	Succeeded by Luigi Macario
Preceded by Arne Geijer	President of the International Confederation of Free Trade Unions; 1965–1972	Succeeded by Donald MacDonald
Political offices
Preceded by Pietro Campilli	President of the National Council for Economics and Labour; 1977–1989	Succeeded by Giuseppe De Rita
