= Zecchino =

Zecchino may refer to:

- Zecchino or sequin, a medieval coin
- Zecchino d'Oro, an Italian music festival
- Ortensio Zecchino, an Italian historian and politician
