= Tiziano Treu =

Italian politician and academic (born 1939)

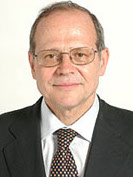

President of the CNEL
- In office 5 May 2017 – 20 April 2023
- Preceded by: Antonio Marzano
- Succeeded by: Renato Brunetta

Minister of Labour and Social Security
- In office 17 January 1995 – 21 October 1998
- Prime Minister: Lamberto Dini; Romano Prodi
- Preceded by: Clemente Mastella
- Succeeded by: Antonio Bassolino

Minister of Transport
- In office 21 October 1998 – 22 December 1999
- Prime Minister: Massimo D'Alema
- Preceded by: Claudio Burlando
- Succeeded by: Pier Luigi Bersani

Member of the Senate of the Republic
- In office 30 May 2001 – 14 March 2013
- Constituency: Veneto (2001–2008); Lombardy (2008–2013)

Member of the Chamber of Deputies
- In office 9 May 1996 – 29 May 2001
- Constituency: Vicenza

Personal details
- Born: 22 August 1939 (age 87) Vicenza, Italy
- Party: PSI (until 1994); RI (1996–2001); DL (2002–2007); PD (since 2007)
- Education: Università Cattolica del Sacro Cuore
- Occupation: Lawyer, University professor, politician

Tiziano Treu (born 22 August 1939) is an Italian politician and academic, former Minister of Labour and Social Security and Minister of Transports, and former president of the National Council for Economics and Labour.

== Biography ==
Treu graduated in law at the Università Cattolica del Sacro Cuore in Milan, where he then began teaching labour law. In his student years, he attended the Augustinianum College, where he met Romano Prodi and Giovanni Maria Flick. Prior to the 1990s, Treu had been close to the democratic-reformist wing of the Italian Socialist Party (PSI).

In 1995 he was nominated Minister of Labour and Social Security in the Dini Cabinet. In 1996 he was elected Deputy as an exponent of Lamberto Dini's Italian Renewal (RI), and was confirmed as the head of the ministry in the Prodi I Cabinet, and then became Minister of Transport in the subsequent D'Alema I Cabinet.

On 24 June 1997, Treu, as Minister of Labour, proposed a delegated law, later named Pacchetto Treu, made with the intention of fight unemployment: with this law temporary agency work obtained legislative recognition from the Italian legal system.

Once the political season of The Olive Tree ended, Treu occupied a marginal role in the Parliament, being however elected to the Senate in 2001 and in 2006 with The Daisy (La Margherita; DL) and in 2008 with the Democratic Party (PD).

In 2013, with the end of his parliamentary mandate, Treu became a member of the National Council for Economics and Labour, an assembly of experts that advises the Italian government, the Parliament and the regions, and promotes legislative initiatives on economic and social matters, and in 2017 he was named president of the assembly by the Gentiloni Cabinet, tough, on the occasion of the constitutional referendum of 2016, he voted to suppress it.

In addition to this, in September 2014, Treu was named by the Renzi Cabinet as Special Commissioner of National Institute of Social Security (INPS), until the election of Tito Boeri as president.

== Electoral history ==
Election	House	Constituency	Party	Votes	Result	Notes
1996	Chamber of Deputies	Vicenza	RI	34,001	Elected	
2001	Senate of the Republic	Veneto – Venice-Spinea	RI	66,915	Elected	
2006	Senate of the Republic	Veneto	DL	– (Note: Elected in a closed list proportional representation system.)	Elected	
2008	Senate of the Republic	Lombardy	PD	–	Elected	
