= Alessandro Bianchi (politician, born 1945) =

Italian academic and politician

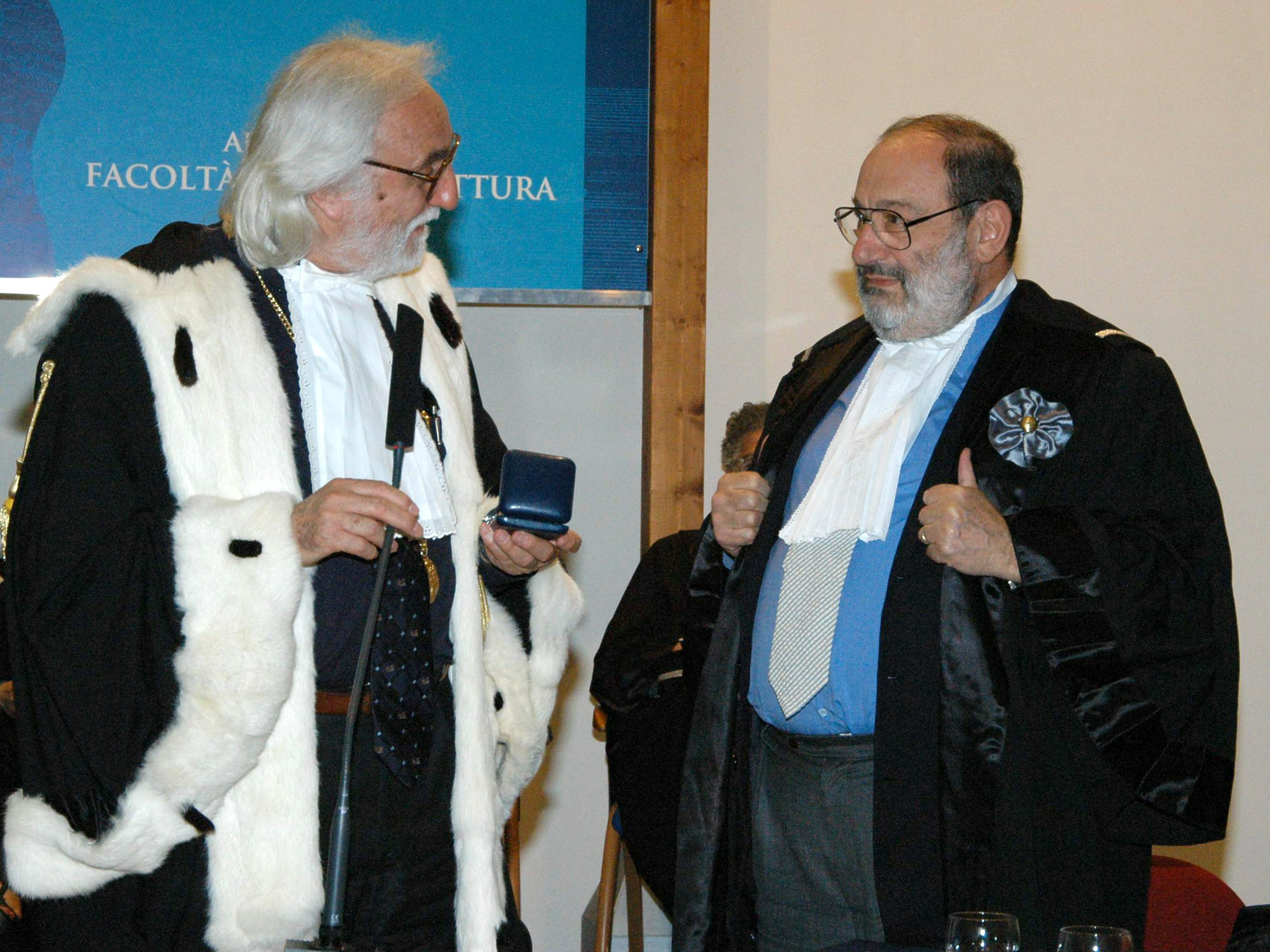
- Allessandro Bianchi (left) with Umberto Eco

Minister of Transport
- In office 17 May 2006 – 8 May 2008
- Prime Minister: Romano Prodi
- Deputy: Cesare De Piccoli
- Preceded by: Pietro Lunardi
- Succeeded by: Altero Matteoli

Personal details
- Born: 28 January 1945 (age 81) Rome, Italy
- Party: Democratic Party
- Education: Sapienza University of Rome

Alessandro Bianchi (born 28 January 1945 in Rome) is an Italian academic and politician, best known for having formerly served as minister of transport from 2006 to 2008.

A registered member of the Italian Communist Party until its disbandment, Bianchi is currently professor of Urban planning at the Faculty of Architecture of University of Reggio Calabria. He was part of the Prodi II Cabinet from 17 May 2006 to 8 May 2008; his name was chosen by a list of prominent left-wing independent people proposed by the Party of Italian Communists. However, he never took membership of such party and instead opted to join the Democratic Party in March 2008.

He is member of Real Academia de Ciencias Económicas y Financieras, Spain, since 2007.

Political offices
Preceded by Pietro Lunardi as Minister for Infrastructure and Transport	Italian Minister of Transport; 2006–2008	Succeeded by Altero Matteoli as Minister for Infrastructure and Transport
