= National Council for Economics and Labour =

Italian government advisory body

- Consiglio nazionale dell'economia e del lavoro
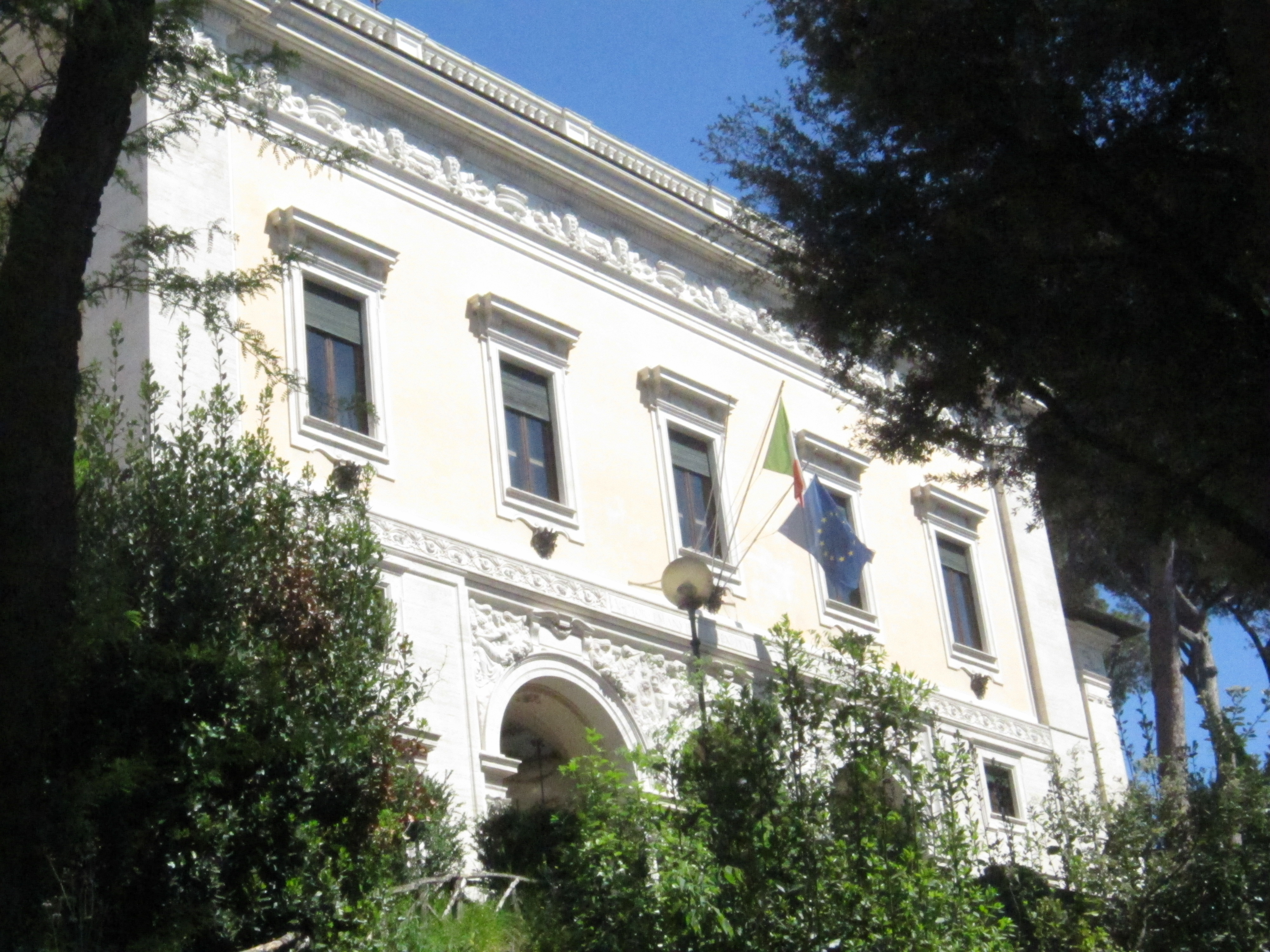

Agency overview
- Formed: 5 January 1957
- Headquarters: Rome, Italy
- Employees: 70 (2014)
- Annual budget: € 29.7 million (2014)
- Agency executive: Salvatore Bosco, President
- Website: www.cnel.it

The National Council for Economics and Labour (in Italian: Consiglio nazionale dell'economia e del lavoro, CNEL) is a constitutional organ provided for by Article 99 of Constitution of Italy and established in 1957. The CNEL is an assembly of experts that advises the Italian government, Parliament and the regions, and promotes legislative initiatives on economic and social matters. The 2016 Italian constitutional referendum tried to abolish it; the reform was rejected.

== Composition ==
Article 99 of the Constitution of Italy lays down that "the National Council for Economics and Labour is composed, as set out by law, of experts and representatives of economic categories in such proportions as to take account of their numerical and qualitative importance". Elections of members of the CNEL are held under Law n. 936 of 30 December 1986.

In accordance with Law no. 214 of 2011, the CNEL is composed of 65 members:

- the President of the CNEL, nominated by the President of the Italian Republic;
- ten experts on economic, social and legal affairs;
  - eight members nominated by the President of the Republic on his/her own initiative;
  - two members chosen by the President of Italy after nomination by the Prime Minister following a decision of the Council of Ministers;
- 48 representatives of public- and private-sector producers of goods and services, specifically,
  - 19 representatives of trade unions;
  - three representatives of public and private management;
  - nine representatives of self-employed workers;
  - 17 representatives of industry;
- six representatives of NGOs.

Members of the CNEL are elected for five years.

== Activities ==
The Constitution (Art. 99) defines the National Economic and Labour Council as an advisory body to Parliament and the Government on matters and in accordance with the functions assigned to it by law, and grants it the power of legislative initiative, together with the power to contribute to the drafting of economic and social legislation in accordance with the principles and within the limits established by law.

The Law (30 December 1986, No. 936), implementing the constitutional provisions, specifies the scope of action of the Body and provides it with the necessary tools for action.

== Presidents ==
#	Presidents	Mandate
1	Meuccio Ruini	1958 – 1959
2	Pietro Campilli	1959 – 1974
3	Bruno Storti	1977 – 1989
4	Giuseppe De Rita	1989 – 2000
5	Pietro Larizza	2000 – 2005
6	Antonio Marzano	2005 – 2015
-	Salvatore Bosco (acting)	2015 – 2016
-	Delio Napoleone (acting)	2016 – 2017
7	Tiziano Treu	2017 – 2023
8	Renato Brunetta	2023 – present

== Headquarters ==
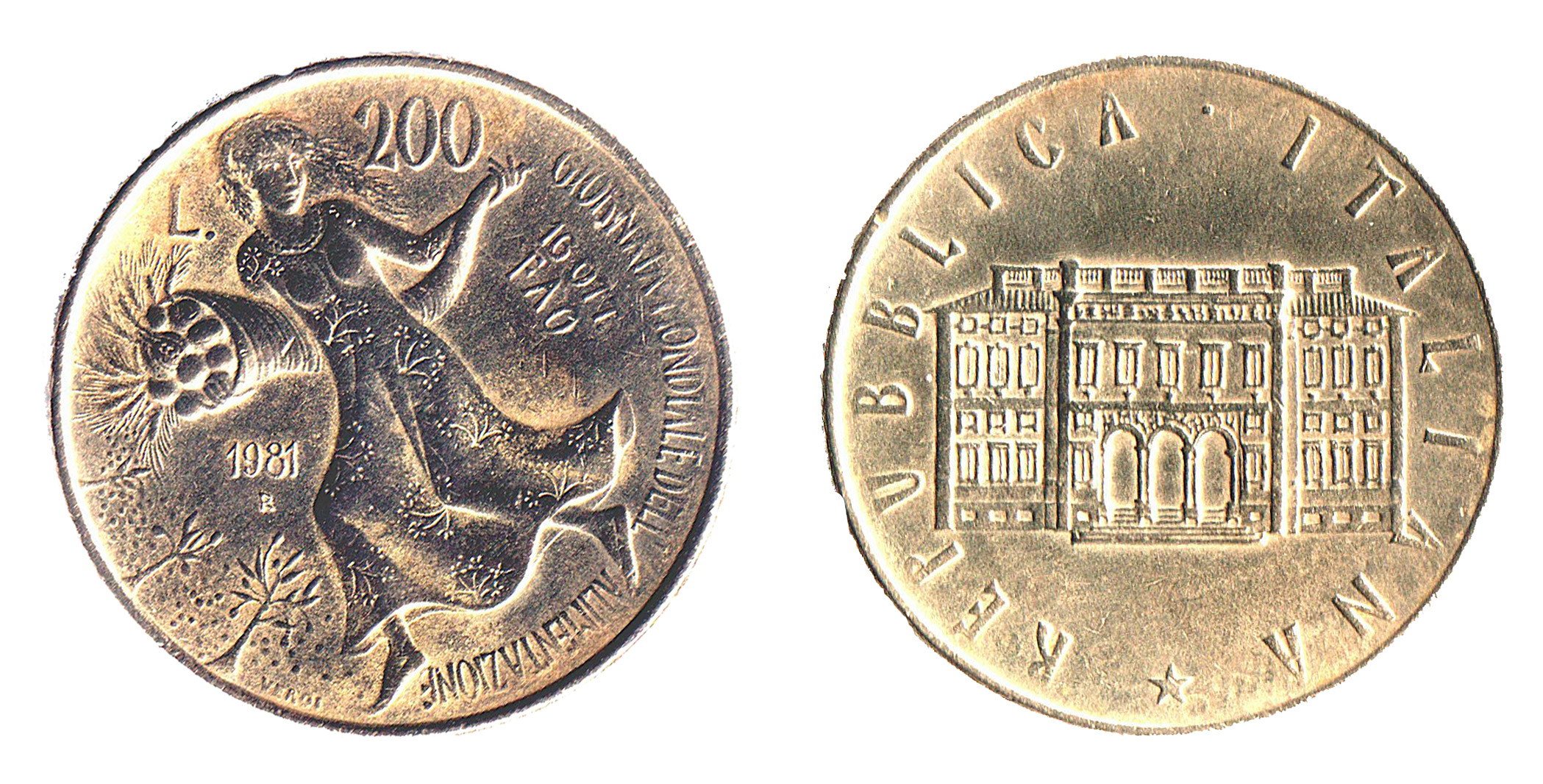
Villa Lubin (on right) on a 200 Italian lira coin celebrating the first World Food Day in 1981

The CNEL is based in the Villa Lubin, built by David Lubin in the park of Villa Borghese in Rome. It was previously the headquarters of the International Institute of Agriculture, from 1908 to 1945.

== See also ==
- Constitution of Italy
- European Economic and Social Committee
- International Association of Economic and Social Councils and Similar Institutions
- Social and Economic Council ^{(the equivalent in the Netherlands)}

== Bibliography ==
- Paolo Caretti; Ugo De Siervo (1996). Giappichelli Editore (ed.). Istituzioni di diritto pubblico. Torino. ISBN 88-348-6210-4.
