= Va' pensiero Padania =

2001 Northern Italian electoral list

Va' pensiero Padania was a Northern-Italian electoral list for the 2001 general election.

In 2000 Lega Nord signed a coalition pact with Silvio Berlusconi's Forza Italia. The Va' pensiero list was designed to attract the disgruntled voters of Lega Nord in some key Senate constituencies that were not given to the party and in which the centre-left was not competitive, in order to have one more elect to the Senate.

Most candidates of Va' pensiero were members of the League, such as incumbent senator Giuseppe Leoni, who stood in Varese. Another leading member and future leader of Lega Padana Lombardia, Roberto Bernardelli, was to stand as candidate in opposition to Marcello Dell'Utri in a constituency in Milan, but later backtracked.

The list gained 1.6% of the vote in Veneto, 0.8% in Lombardy and 1.1% Piedmont, doing particularly well in the constituencies of Vittorio Veneto (5.0%), Conegliano (4.5%), Varese (3.9%), Biella (4.0%) and Cuneo (4.1%). The list however failed its scope as Liga Fronte Veneto (4.9% in Veneto) and Lega per l'Autonomia – Alleanza Lombarda (5.4% in Lombardy), two spin-offs of Lega Nord, attracted the vote of most Lega Nord dissidents and also of many voters who confused them with the mother party.
