= The Sunflower =

The Sunflower Il Girasole
- Leader: Enrico Boselli, Grazia Francescato
- Founded: 26 February 2001
- Dissolved: May 2001
- Ideology: Social democracy Green politics
- Political position: Centre-left to left-wing
- National affiliation: The Olive Tree
- Colors: Green and red

The Sunflower (Italian: Il Girasole) was an electoral alliance of two Italian centre-left parties for the 2001 Italian general election, namely:

- Federation of the Greens (Federazione dei Verdi)
- Italian Democratic Socialists (Socialisti Democratici Italiani, SDI)

The Sunflower was founded to benefit from the proportional list voting system employed in the election; however, the member parties received too few votes to benefit from their alliance. They did manage to enter parliament via its participation on the Olive Tree list, however, so the electoral alliance was disbanded soon afterwards.
