= Christian Democracy (Italy, 2004) =

Christian Democracy Democrazia Cristiana
- Secretary: Angelo Sandri
- President: Filippo Marino
- Founded: 24 July 2004
- Split from: Christian Democracy (2002)
- Headquarters: Via A. Ugolini 28, Rome
- Newspaper: Il Popolo - online
- Ideology: Christian democracy Popularism
- Political position: Centre
- National affiliation: Us of the Centre

Christian Democracy (Democrazia Cristiana, DC), also known as Christian Democracy – Third Pole of the Centre (Democrazia Cristiana – Terzo Polo di Centro), is a minor Christian-democratic political party in Italy. It was founded in July 2004 by Angelo Sandri following is expulsion from the Christian Democracy led by Giuseppe Pizza. Since then the party has taken part in long legal battles on the property of the symbol and the name of the original Christian Democracy with its rival party.

In the 2007 local elections, the party formed a temporary alliance with the Christian Democracy for Autonomies of Gianfranco Rotondi, while in the 2008 general election it was part of the Union of the Centre alliance led by Pier Ferdinando Casini. Since then, it has regained its autonomy.

In February 2012, the PDC was joined by Rebirth of Christian Democracy (RDC), whose leader Carlo Senaldi was appointed president of the party.

On the occasion of the 2013 general election the Christian Democracy joined Popular Agreement, the new party founded by Giampiero Catone.

In July 2014 the Secretary Angelo Sandri has been disheartened by a part of the National Council and the President Anna Ciammetti was named commissioner of the party. However, Sandri did not accept the decision and expelled Ciammetti and her supporters from the party.

In the 2019 European Parliament Election, the party joined the Populars for Italy list.

On the occasion of the general elections of 2022, the DC joined the "Us of the Centre–Europeanists" list, led by Clemente Mastella.

== Leadership ==
- Secretary: Angelo Sandri (2004–present)
