= Union of Democrats for Europe =

Union of Democrats for Europe Unione Democratici per l'Europa
- Leader: Clemente Mastella
- Founded: 23 May 1999
- Dissolved: 2013
- Preceded by: Democratic Union for the Republic
- Succeeded by: Us of the Centre
- Headquarters: Largo Arenula, 34; 00186 Rome
- Newspaper: Il Campanile
- Membership: unknown
- Ideology: Christian democracy
- Political position: Centre
- National affiliation: The Daisy (2001–2002); The Union (2005–2008); The People of Freedom (2009–2013); Forza Italia (2013–2019)
- European affiliation: European People's Party (1998–2015)
- European Parliament group: European People's Party (1998–2014)
- International affiliation: Centrist Democrat International (1998–2015)

Website
- www.popolariudeur.it

The Union of Democrats for Europe (Italian: Unione Democratici per l'Europa, UDEUR), also known as UDEUR Populars (Popolari UDEUR), was a minor centrist, Christian-democratic political party in Italy.

Led by Clemente Mastella, minister of Labour in Berlusconi I Cabinet (1994–1995), minister of Justice in Prodi II Cabinet (2006–2008) and current mayor of Benevento (since 2016), the party has been at times very strong in Southern Italy, but almost irrelevant in Northern Italy. After a decline in terms of popularity in 2007–2008, the party resisted only in Campania, Mastella's heartland, and few other regions. The party was briefly revived in the run-up of the 2018 general election.

== History ==
=== Early years ===
The UDEUR emerged in May 1999 at the breakup of the Democratic Union for the Republic (UDR). This party had been founded in June 1998, under the leadership of Francesco Cossiga, by the merger of Rocco Buttiglione's United Christian Democrats, Mastella's Christian Democrats for the Republic (a splinter group from the Christian Democratic Centre), the Segni Pact and splinters from Forza Italia, National Alliance and Lega Nord. At its foundation, the UDEUR included a minister in Massimo D'Alema's government, Salvatore Cardinale at the ministry of Communications.

At its electoral debut at the 1999 European Parliament election, the party received 1.6% of the vote, having its strongholds in the South (5.1% in Campania, 3.4% in Basilicata, 4.4% in Calabria and 7.1% in Sicily).

In the run-up to the 2001 general election the UDEUR joined the Democracy is Freedom – The Daisy (DL) electoral list, along with the Italian People's Party, The Democrats and Italian Renewal. Under the leadership of Francesco Rutelli, who ran also as leader of the entire The Olive Tree centre-left coalition, DL gained 14.6% of the vote. The list's success led to a debate over forming a joint party. When DL was effectively transformed into a party in early 2002, the UDEUR refused to join and remained an independent party within the centre-left.

=== Heyday ===
In 2004 the party changed its official name to UDEUR Populars and amended its symbol accordingly (it would later go back to its original name).

At the 2004 European Parliament election UDEUR achieved 1.3% of the national vote (5.4% in Campania, 4.0% in Basilicata, 3.8% in Calabria and 2.7% in Sicily), enough to elect an MEP, who sat in the European People's Party – European Democrats (EPP–ED) group.

At the 2005 regional elections the party had its best result ever, having scored 10.3% in Campania, 11.1% in Basilicata and 8.7% in Calabria.

Toward the end of the 2001–06 parliamentary term, Mastella decided to continue the alliance with the centre-left, although he and his party were in conflict with the secularist policies proposed by the new coalition partner Rose in the Fist and despite the presence of far-left parties such as the Communist Refoundation Party. At the 2006 general election the UDEUR was part of The Union centre-left coalition in support of Romano Prodi. It obtained 1.4% of the vote, electing 14 deputies (4 in The Olive Tree's list) and 3 senators. The Union won the election, and Mastella was appointed Minister of Justice in Romano Prodi's second government.

=== The fall ===
On 16 January 2008 Clemente Mastella, who was under investigation by prosecutor Luigi de Magistris, resigned as Minister of Justice and on 21 January decided to withdraw his party's support to Romano Prodi, who himself resigned after a vote of confidence in the Senate on 24 January, clearing the way toward a snap election.

In the following weeks the party suffered several splits leading to several regional parties, notably the Democratic Populars in Campania, the United Populars in Basilicata and the Sardinian Autonomist Populars in Sardinia, while the Umbrian regional section joined Christian Democracy. Most leading members, including Antonio Satta (who would later launch the Christian Popular Union), Stefano Cusumano, Mauro Fabris, Armando Veneto and Tommaso Barbato, left.

At the 2008 general election both The People of Freedom (PdL) and the Union of the Centre (UdC) refused the UDEUR as coalition partner. The party was thus reduced to a regional party in Campania. The party chose not to present any list in the election and even Mastella decided not to run for re-election.

=== After the fall ===
In February 2009 the UDEUR formed an alliance with the PdL in Campania; under the agreement, the UDEUR supported centre-right candidates in the 2009 provincial and municipal elections in the region and Mastella was elected to the 2009 European Parliament election in the PdL list.

After being almost disbanded in 2008, the party tried to recover and broaden its base. Some former UDEUR members came back and new members joined. The latter included Giulio Di Donato, a former leading figure of the Italian Socialist Party, who was appointed regional secretary in Campania. In 2010 the party was briefly known as Populars for the South, as it was active only in the South by that time. In 2011 Mastella ran for mayor of Naples and gained just 2.5% of the vote.

In 2013, the UDEUR became an associate party of Forza Italia (FI). At the 2014 European Parliament election Mastella, a candidate with FI, was not re-elected.

=== Re-foundation ===
The party was revived in the run-up of the 2018 general election, in alliance with the Union of the Centre (UdC), and re-styled once again its symbol. However, Mastella later formed a new pact with FI, under which his wife would run in the election, and in February 2018 they officially joined FI.

In 2020, Mastella re-branded the party under the name Us Campanians (Noi Campani), taking part in the 2020 Campania regional election in support of the Democratic governor, Vincenzo De Luca. In 2021, Mastella launched a new political party in order to compete in countrywide elections: Us of the Centre (Noi di Centro).

== Electoral results ==
=== Italian Parliament ===
Chamber of Deputies
Election year	Votes	%	Seats	+/−	Leader
2001	into The Daisy	–	7 / 630	–	Clemente Mastella
2006	534,088 (11th)	1.4	10 / 630	▲3	Clemente Mastella

Senate of the Republic
Election year	Votes	%	Seats	+/−	Leader
2001	into Ulivo	–	4 / 315	–	Clemente Mastella
2006	477,226 (11th)	1.4	3 / 315	▼1	Clemente Mastella

=== European Parliament ===
European Parliament
Election year	Votes	%	Seats	+/−	Leader
1999	498,742 (14th)	1.6	1 / 87	–	Clemente Mastella
2004	419,173 (12th)	1.3	1 / 78	–	Clemente Mastella
2009	into PdL	–	1 / 72	–	Clemente Mastella
2014	into Forza Italia	–	0 / 73	▼1	Clemente Mastella

== Leadership ==
- Secretary: Clemente Mastella (1999–2013)
  - Deputy Secretary: Stefano Cusumano (1999–2005), Antonio Satta (2005–2008), Marco Di Stefano (2007–2008), Paolo Del Mese (2010–2012)
  - Coordinator: Mauro Fabris (1999–2006), Domenico Romano Carratelli (2010–2012)
- President: Irene Pivetti (1999–2002), Ida Dentamaro (2002–2004), Mino Martinazzoli (2004–2005), Lorenzo Acquarone (2005–2006), Federica Rossi Gasparrini (2007–2008), Marilina Intrieri (2009–2010)
- Administrative Secretary: Tancredi Cimmino (1999–2006), Mauro Fabris (2006), Pier Paolo Sganga (2006–2008)

== Symbols ==
1999–2003

2004–2006

2006–2010,
2012–2015

2011–2012
