= Giovanni Mongiello =

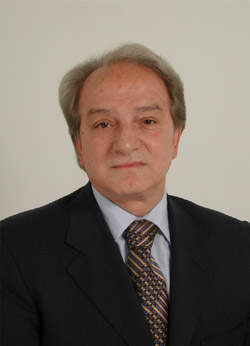

Mayor of Foggia
- In office 21 June 1981 – 1 March 1983
- Preceded by: Pellegrino Graziani
- Succeeded by: Enzo Petrino

Undersecretary of State for the Merchant Marine
- In office 22 July 1989 – 28 June 1992

Undersecretary of State for the Treasury
- In office 10 May 1994 – 17 January 1995

Undersecretary of State for Agricultural Policies
- In office 17 May 2006 – 28 April 2008

Member of the Chamber of Deputies
- In office 1983–1994

Member of the Senate of the Republic
- In office 1994–1996

Personal details
- Born: 1 May 1942 (age 84) Foggia, Kingdom of Italy
- Party: Christian Democracy (until 1994), Christian Democratic Centre, United Christian Democrats, Union of Christian and Centre Democrats

Giovanni Mongiello (born 1 May 1942) is an Italian politician. A member of the Christian Democracy and its successor parties, he served as mayor of Foggia from 1981 to 1983, as a member of both chambers of the Italian Parliament, and as undersecretary of state in several governments between 1989 and 2008.
