= Clemente Mastella =

Italian politician (born 1947)

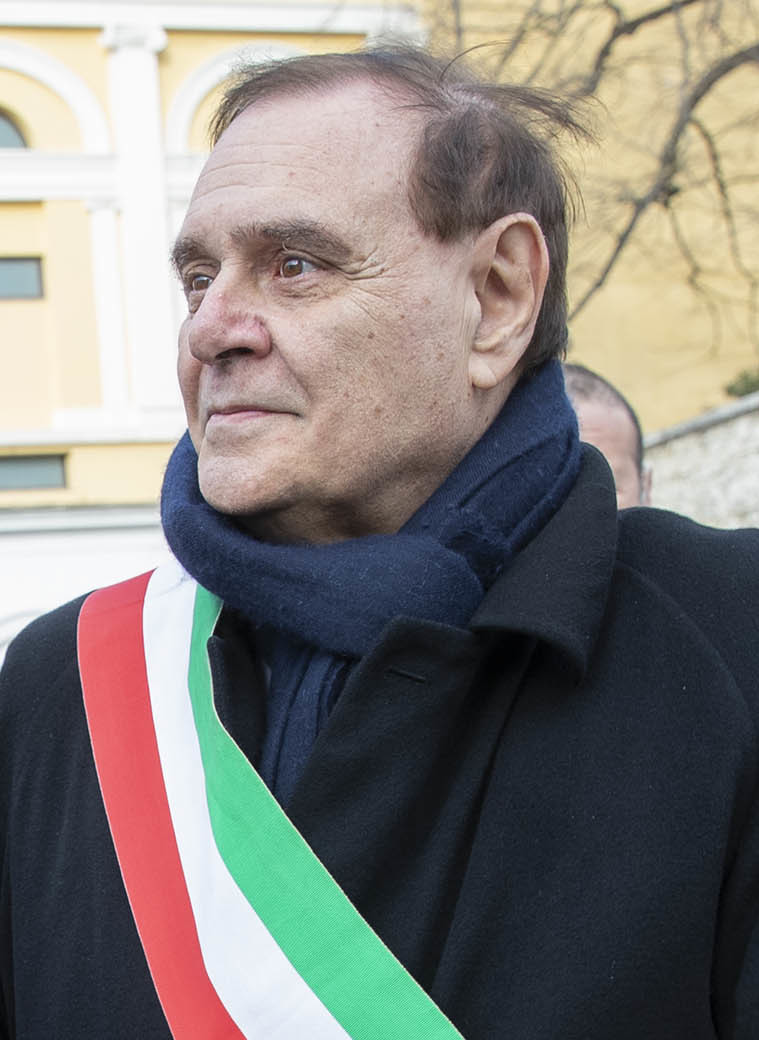
- Mastella in 2020

Mayor of Benevento
- Incumbent
- Assumed office 20 June 2016
- Preceded by: Fausto Pepe

Minister of Justice
- In office 17 May 2006 – 16 January 2008
- Prime Minister: Romano Prodi
- Preceded by: Roberto Castelli
- Succeeded by: Romano Prodi

Minister of Labour and Social Security
- In office 10 May 1994 – 17 January 1995
- Prime Minister: Silvio Berlusconi
- Preceded by: Gino Giugni
- Succeeded by: Tiziano Treu

Member of the European Parliament for Southern Italy
- In office 14 July 2009 – 1 July 2014
- In office 20 July 1999 – 20 July 2004

Member of the Senate of the Republic
- In office 28 April 2006 – 28 April 2008
- Constituency: Calabria

Member of the Chamber of Deputies
- In office 5 July 1976 – 27 April 2006
- Constituency: Campania

Mayor of Ceppaloni
- In office 27 May 2003 – 15 April 2008
- Preceded by: Nicola Nino Rossi
- Succeeded by: Claudio Cataudo
- In office 10 March 1986 – 21 July 1992
- Succeeded by: Antonio Parente

Personal details
- Born: Mario Clemente Mastella; 5 February 1947 (age 79) Ceppaloni, Italy
- Party: DC (1976–1994); CDC (1994–1998); CDR (1998); UDR (1998–1999); UDEUR (1999–2013); FI (2013–2015; 2018–2020); PpS (2015–2017); UDEUR 2.0 (2017–2018); NC (2020–2021); NDC (since 2021)
- Height: 1.77 m (5 ft 10 in)
- Spouse: Sandra Lonardo (m. 1975)
- Children: 2
- Profession: Politician, former journalist

Mario Clemente Mastella (born 5 February 1947) is an Italian politician who has been the mayor of Benevento since 20 June 2016. He also served as leader of the Union of Democrats for Europe (UDEUR), a minor centrist and Christian-democratic Italian party. Mastella, who began his career in the Christian Democracy (DC) party, being elected to the Chamber of Deputies in 1976, is known for his trasformismo, changing over his career many political parties and affiliations.

Mastella was Minister of Labour and Social Policies in the first Berlusconi government from 10 May 1994 to 17 January 1995 and Minister of Justice in the second Prodi government from 17 May 2006 to 17 January 2008. During the same period, he was a member of the Senate of the Republic and determined the narrow majority of Romano Prodi's government, which ended when he started the 2008 Italian government crisis that led to Prodi's resignation as prime minister and Silvio Berlusconi return to power after the snap election that ensued. In June 2009, he was elected to the European Parliament on the list of The People of Freedom (PdL) of Berlusconi; it was his second stint at the European Parliament, after a first term with the UDEUR from 1999 until 2004. After having been the mayor of Ceppaloni twice in three separate decades (1980s, 1990s, and 2000s), he was elected mayor of Benevento in 2016 and re-elected in 2021.

== Early life and education ==
Mastella was born in Ceppaloni, in the province of Benevento. He graduated in philosophy at the University of Naples Federico II with a thesis on Antonio Gramsci, and later became a journalist. His career as a journalist and his beginnings in political life have been widely described by himself in various interviews, cited for example in the book La casta by Sergio Rizzo and Gian Antonio Stella, where his hiring at the RAI, Italy's public broadcasting, had been helped by a recommendation from the DC politician Ciriaco De Mita. The local editorial office where Mastella took office proclaimed a three-day strike against the entry into the role of a journalist hired without regular competition and for direct political appointment.

== Political career ==
=== Deputy, mayor of Ceppaloni, and Minister of Labour ===
In 1976, Mastella was elected to the Chamber of Deputies as a member of the DC party. In 1986, he became mayor of Ceppaloni, a position he held until 1992 and again from 2003 to 2008. From 1989 to 1992, he was the Secretary of State to the Ministry of Defence. From 1993 to 1994, he was the vice-president of the Chamber of Deputies. After the party's dissolution in 1994, Mastella joined with Pier Ferdinando Casini to found a new party, the Christian Democratic Centre (CCD). That same year, following the election victory of Berlusconi, he was appointed Minister of Labour and Social Policies.

In 1998, after the fall of the first Prodi government, Mastella decided to follow Francesco Cossiga, lifetime senator and former Italian president. Mastella left his party to found the Christian Democrats for the Republic (CDR), then Democratic Union for the Republic (UDR). This new political party, which supported the new centre-left coalition government led by Massimo D'Alema, lasted one year. In 1999, Mastella took over the leadership of UDEUR and was elected to the European Parliament. In 2005, Mastella took part in the centre-left coalition's primary election for the leadership of The Union. He obtained 4.6% of the vote. Mastella and the then Sicily president Salvatore Cuffaro were subjects of a scandal when it was revealed that they had been the best men of Francesco Campanella, a former member of the Sicilian Mafia who helped the boss Bernardo Provenzano when he was a fugitive from the law. Mastella had been a witness at Campanella's wedding in July 2000.

=== Senator and Minister of Justice ===
In 2006, Mastella became minister of Justice in the second Prodi government. Mastella promoted a general amnesty in 2006. He also proposed criminalising Holocaust denial but dropped the proposal after opposition by historians and concerns about such a law being unconstitutional. As Minister of Justice, Mastella received an advice of judicial proceedings in February 2007 from the Naples prosecutors' office. The office was investigating Mastella for fraudulent bankruptcy regarding the collapse of the Naples football club SSC Napoli in 2004. Mastella had been the vice-president of the club's board of directors.

In September 2007, Mastella asked the High Council of the Judiciary to arrange the transfer of Catanzaro prosecuting attorney Luigi De Magistris, who was inquiring on a committee of illegal transactions composed by politicians (including Mastella himself) and magistrates. Mastella's wife, Sandra Lonardo, at the time also a UDEUR politician who was the acting president of the Regional Council of Campania. She had been under house arrest for suspected bribery since 16 January 2008. Meanwhile, Mastella resigned from his position as Justice Minister; in announcing his resignation, he said that "between the love of my family and power I choose the former" and expressed his desire to be "more free from a political and personal point of view". Prodi rejected the resignation. On 17 January 2008, Mastella said again that he was resigning. Prodi was to temporarily take over his portfolio. In 2017, Mastella was cleared of charges.

=== 2008 Italian political crisis ===
Despite having earlier said that he would support Prodi's government without participating in it, Mastella said on 21 January 2008 that his party was ending its support, thereby depriving the government of its narrow majority in the Senate of the Republic. Mastella said that UDEUR wanted an early election and that it would vote against the government if there was a vote of confidence. Mastella's decision occurred a few days after the Constitutional Court of Italy confirmed that there would be a referendum to modify the electoral system. Earlier in 2007, Mastella had stated more than once that if the referendum was confirmed, it would lead directly to the fall of the government.

The fall of the government disrupted a pending election-law referendum that, if it had been passed, would have made it harder for small parties like Mastella's to gain seats in the Italian Parliament. On 6 February 2008, Mastella announced that he would be part of Berlusconi's House of Freedoms party. On 1 March 2008, Berlusconi refused to form a coalition with Mastella, citing too many differences in their political programmes. After failing to secure a coalition with any other political party, Mastella decided to quit the electoral competition on 7 March 2008, as the Italian electoral system subjects political parties not a part of a coalition to thresholds of 4% and 8% for the Chamber of Deputies and the Senate of the Republic, respectively.

=== Member of the European Parliament ===
From 1999 to 2004, Mastella was a member of the European Parliament (MEP) for UDEUR as part of the European People's Party (EPP). In June 2009, Mastella was elected for a second time a MEP on the EPP list of Berlusconi's PdL party. In July 2009, he attracted attention because of statements made about the per diem collected at the European Parliament. In a lift to his assistants, he said: "An allowance of 290 euro! It's misery. ... They do not know what you get in the Italian Parliament." In the first months of the Seventh European Parliament legislature (2009–2014), he was one of the MEPs less present during voting in plenary meetings.

=== Mayor of Benevento ===
On 20 June 2016, Mastella was elected mayor of Benevento as head of a centre-right coalition. In July 2019, Mastella was considered as a Forza Italia (FI) candidate for the 2020 Campania regional election. On 3 June 2020, he left FI to create a regional list named Us Campanians (NC) in support of centre-left coalition incumbent president Vincenzo De Luca for his re-election campaign. In 2021, he was re-elected mayor of Benevento through civic lists.

== Personal life ==
In 1975, Mastella married Sandra Lonardo, a native of Benevento whom he met during a visit to an uncle in Oyster Bay, New York, where she spent a good part of her youth. They have two sons, Elio and Pellegrino.

== Electoral history ==
Election	House	Constituency	Party	Votes	Result
1976	Chamber of Deputies	Benevento–Avellino–Salerno	DC	64,631	Elected
1979	Chamber of Deputies	Benevento–Avellino–Salerno	DC	98,811	Elected
1983	Chamber of Deputies	Benevento–Avellino–Salerno	DC	115,209	Elected
1987	Chamber of Deputies	Benevento–Avellino–Salerno	DC	141,768	Elected
1992	Chamber of Deputies	Benevento–Avellino–Salerno	DC	74,094	Elected
1994	Chamber of Deputies	Sant'Agata de' Goti	CCD	17,011	Elected
1996	Chamber of Deputies	Campania 2	CCD	– (Note: Elected in a closed list proportional representation system.)	Elected
1999	European Parliament	Southern Italy	UDEUR	66,158	Elected
2001	Chamber of Deputies	Campania 2	UDEUR	–	Elected
2006	Senate of the Republic	Calabria	UDEUR	–	Elected
2009	European Parliament	Southern Italy	UDEUR (Note: Elected within The People of Freedom (PdL) party list.)	113,061	Elected
2014	European Parliament	Southern Italy	FI	60,395	Not elected

Source: Ministry of the Interior

Political offices
Preceded by Gino Giugni	Minister of Labour and Social Policies; 1994–1995	Succeeded by Tiziano Treu
Preceded by Roberto Castelli	Minister of Justice; 2006–2008	Succeeded by Romano Prodi ad interim
Italian Chamber of Deputies
Preceded by Title jointly held	Member of the Chamber of Deputies; Legislatures; VII, VIII, IX, X, XI, XII, XIII, XIV; 1976–2006	Succeeded by Title jointly held
Italian Senate
Preceded by Title jointly held	Member of the Senate of the Republic; Legislatures; XV; 2006–2008	Succeeded by Title jointly held
Party political offices
Preceded by New Party	Secretary of UDEUR; 1999–2013	Succeeded by Party disbanded
