= 2001 Italian general election =

- 13 May 2001

All 630 seats in the Chamber of Deputies 316 seats needed for a majority 315 seats in the Senate 163 seats needed for a majority (Note: taking into account the Senators for life, which accounted for 9 seats at the time the election took place)
- Registered: 49,256,295 (C) · 44,499,794 (S)
- Turnout: 40,085,397 (C) · 81.4% (▼1.5 pp); 36,189,394 (S) · 81.3% (▼0.9 pp)
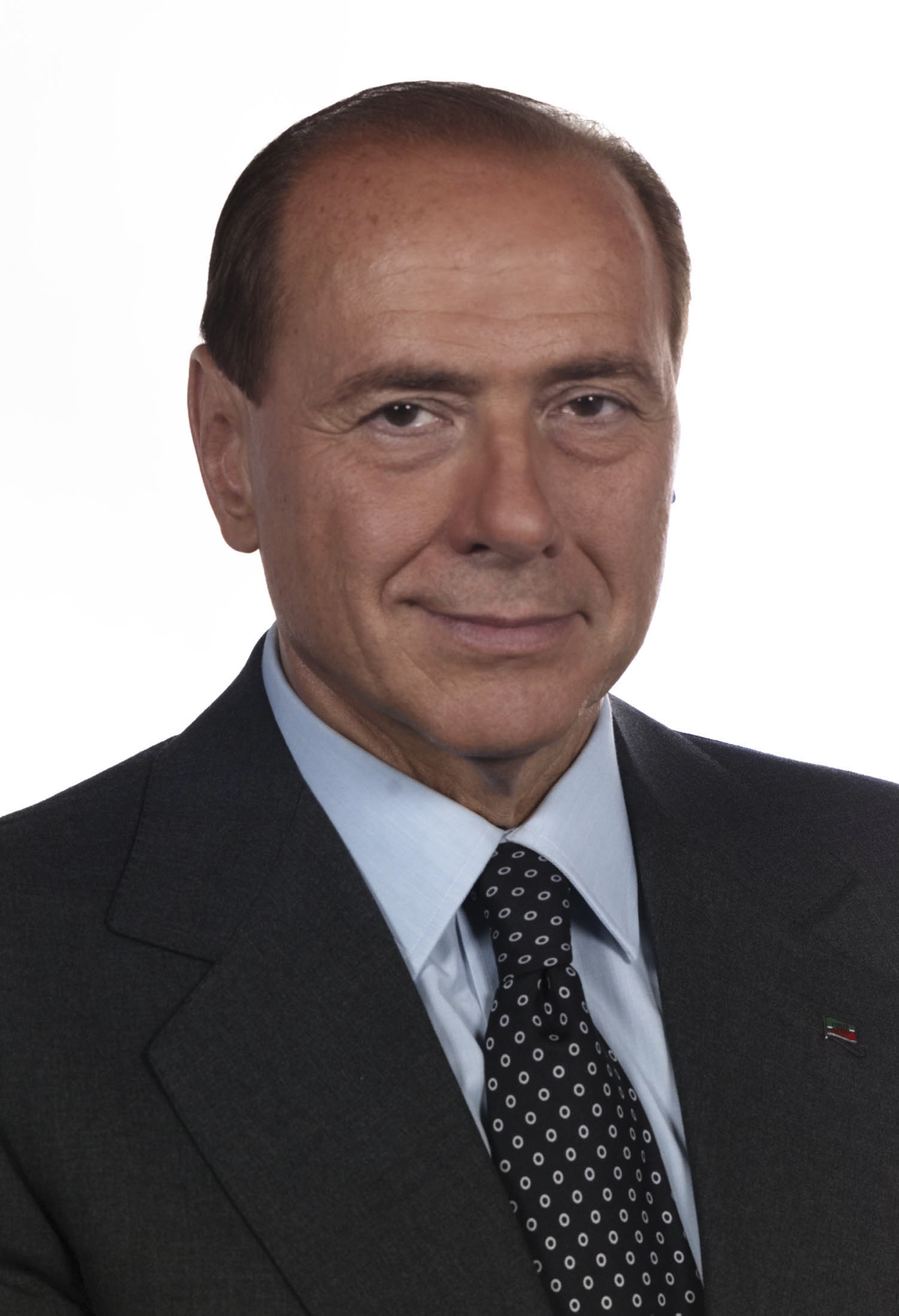

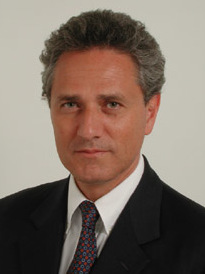

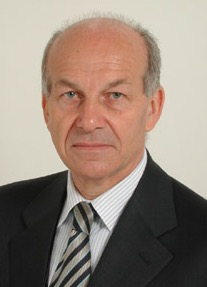
	First party	Second party	Third party
Leader	Silvio Berlusconi	Francesco Rutelli	Fausto Bertinotti
Party	Forza Italia	The Daisy	PRC
Alliance	House of Freedoms	The Olive Tree	—
Leader since	26 January 1994	25 September 2000	22 January 1994
Leader's seat	Milano Centrale (C)	Roma Palestrina (C)	Piedmont (C)
Seats won	368 (C) / 176 (S)	241 (C) / 128 (S)	11 (C) / 4 (S)
Seat change	▲96 (C) / ▲33 (S)	▼82 (C) / ▼29 (S)	▼24 (C) / ▼6 (S)
Constituency vote	16,915,513 (C); 14,406,519 (S)	16,019,388 (C); 13,106,860 (S)	Did not run (C); 1,708,707 (S)
% and swing	45.6% (C) ▼5.3 pp 42.5% (S) ▼5.3 pp	43.2% (C) ▲1.2 pp 38.7% (S) ▼3.5 pp	Did not run (C); 5.0% (S) ▲2.1 pp
Party vote	18,398,246 (C)	13,169,239 (C)	1,868,659 (C)
% and swing	49.6% (C) ▼2.6 pp	35.7% (C) ▲1.0 pp	5.0% (C) ▼3.6 pp
- Results of the single-member constituencies in the Chamber of Deputies (left) and Senate (right).
Prime Minister before election
Giuliano Amato
The Olive Tree
Prime Minister after the election
Silvio Berlusconi
House of Freedoms

The 2001 Italian general election was held in Italy on 13 May 2001 to elect members of the Chamber of Deputies and the Senate of the Republic. The election was won by the centre-right coalition House of Freedoms led by Silvio Berlusconi, defeating Francesco Rutelli, former mayor of Rome, and leader of the centre-left coalition The Olive Tree, and rising back to power after Berlusconi's first victory in the 1994 Italian general election.

== Electoral system ==
The election was regulated by the Mattarella law of 1993, also known as "Mattarellum".

The intricate electoral system, called scorporo, provided 75% of the seats on the Chamber of Deputies (the Lower House) as elected by first-past-the-post system, whereas the remaining 25% was assigned on proportional representation with a minimum threshold of 4%.

The method used for the Senate was even more complicated: 75% of seats by uninominal method, and 25% by a special proportional method that assigned the remaining seats to minority parties. Formally, these were examples of mixed-member majoritarian systems with partial compensation.

== Campaign ==
For this election Berlusconi ran again for Prime Minister as leader of the centre-right House of Freedoms (Italian: La Casa delle Libertà), which included the Forza Italia, National Alliance, Northern League, Christian Democratic Centre, United Christian Democrats and other minor parties. The candidate for Prime Minister of the centre-left Olive Tree (Italian: L'Ulivo) was Francesco Rutelli, former mayor of Rome.

On the television interviews programme Porta a Porta, during the last days of the electoral campaign, Berlusconi created a powerful impression on the public by undertaking to sign a so-called Contratto con gli Italiani (English: Contract with the Italians), an idea copied outright by his advisor Luigi Crespi from the Newt Gingrich's Contract with America introduced six weeks before the 1994 US Congressional election, which was widely considered to be a creative masterstroke in his 2001 campaign bid for prime ministership. In this solemn agreement, Berlusconi claimed his commitment on improving several aspects of the Italian economy and life. Firstly, he undertook to simplify the complex tax system by introducing just two tax rates (33% for those earning over 100,000 euros, and 23% for anyone earning less than that figure: anyone earning less than 11,000 euros a year would not be taxed); secondly, he promised to halve the unemployment rate; thirdly, he undertook to finance and develop a massive new public works programme. Fourthly, he promised to raise the minimum monthly pension rate to 516 euros; and fifthly, he would suppress the crime wave by introducing police officers to patrol all local zones and areas in Italy's major cities. Berlusconi undertook to refrain from putting himself up for re-election in 2006 if he failed to honour at least four of these five promises.

== Main coalitions and parties ==
Coalition	Party	Main ideology	Seats			Party leader	Coalition leader
Coalition	Party	Main ideology	C	S	Total	Party leader	Coalition leader
The Olive Tree	Democrats of the Left (DS)	Social democracy	161	102	263	Massimo D'Alema	Francesco Rutelli
The Olive Tree	Democracy is Freedom (DL) (Note: An electoral alliance composed of the Italian People's Party, Democrats, Italian Renewal and UDEUR.)	Social liberalism, Christian left	102	48	150	Francesco Rutelli	Francesco Rutelli
The Olive Tree	The Sunflower (FdV–SDI)	Green politics, social democracy	20	17	37	Grazia Francescato; Enrico Boselli	Francesco Rutelli
The Olive Tree	Party of Italian Communists (PdCI)	Communism	20	6	26	Oliviero Diliberto	Francesco Rutelli
The Olive Tree	South Tyrolean People's Party (SVP)	Regionalism	4	2	6	Luis Durnwalder	Francesco Rutelli
House of Freedoms	Forza Italia (FI)	Liberal conservatism	117	45	162	Silvio Berlusconi	Silvio Berlusconi
House of Freedoms	National Alliance (AN)	National conservatism	88	42	130	Gianfranco Fini	Silvio Berlusconi
House of Freedoms	Northern League (LN)	Regionalism	46	18	64	Umberto Bossi	Silvio Berlusconi
House of Freedoms	White Flower (CCD–CDU)	Christian democracy	18	12	30	Pier Ferdinando Casini	Silvio Berlusconi
House of Freedoms	Italian Republican Party (PRI)	Liberalism	1	0	1	Giorgio La Malfa	Silvio Berlusconi
House of Freedoms	New Italian Socialist Party (NPSI)	Social democracy	0	0	0	Gianni De Michelis	Silvio Berlusconi
Communist Refoundation Party (PRC)		Communism	14	3	17	Fausto Bertinotti	
European Democracy (DE)		Christian democracy	0	10	10	Sergio D'Antoni	
Bonino List (LB)		Liberalism	0	1	1	Emma Bonino	
Tricolour Flame (FT)		Neo-fascism	0	1	1	Pino Rauti	
Italy of Values (IdV)		Anti-corruption politics	0	0	0	Antonio Di Pietro	

== Results ==
=== Chamber of Deputies ===
==== Overall results ====
← Summary of the 13 May 2001 Chamber of Deputies election results →
Coalition	Party	Proportional			First-past-the-post			Total seats	+/–
Coalition	Party	Votes	%	Seats	Votes	%	Seats	Total seats	+/–
House of Freedoms	Forza Italia (FI)	10,923,431	29.43	62	16,915,513	45.57	132	194	+71
House of Freedoms	National Alliance (AN)	4,463,205	12.02	24	16,915,513	45.57	75	99	+6
House of Freedoms	Northern League (LN)	1,464,301	3.94	0	16,915,513	45.57	30	30	−29
House of Freedoms	White Flower (CCD–CDU)	1,194,040	3.22	0	16,915,513	45.57	40	40	+10
House of Freedoms	New Italian Socialist Party (NPSI)	353,269	0.95	0	16,915,513	45.57	3	3	New
House of Freedoms	Sardinian Reformers (RS)	—N/a	—N/a	0	16,915,513	45.57	1	1	+1
House of Freedoms	New Sicily (NS)	—N/a	—N/a	0	16,915,513	45.57	1	1	New
House of Freedoms	Total seats			86			282	368	–
The Olive Tree	Democrats of the Left (DS)	6,151,154	16.57	31	16,019,388	43.15	105	136	−36
The Olive Tree	Democracy is Freedom (DL)	5,391,827	14.52	27	16,019,388	43.15	56	83	−12
The Olive Tree	The Sunflower (FdV–SDI)	805,340	2.17	0	16,019,388	43.15	17	17	–
The Olive Tree	Party of Italian Communists (PdCI)	620,859	1.67	0	16,019,388	43.15	10	10	New
The Olive Tree	South Tyrolean People's Party (SVP)	200,059	0.54	0	16,019,388	43.15	3	3	±0
The Olive Tree	With Illy for Trieste	78,284	0.21	0	16,019,388	43.15	1	1	New
The Olive Tree	Total seats			58			192	250	–
Communist Refoundation Party (PRC)		1,868,659	5.03	11	—N/a	—N/a	0	11	−24
Aosta Valley (VdA)		—N/a	—N/a	0	25,577	0.07	1	1	±0
Others		3,745,277	9.73	0	4,162,298	11.21	0	0	−1
Total		37,259,705	100.00	155	37,122,776	100.00	475	630	—N/a

==== Proportional and FPTP results ====
In 2001 the proportional list exhausted before all the deputies – which the winning party was entitled to – were declared elected.

First-past-the-post
Party or coalition	Votes	%	Seats
House of Freedoms (CdL)	16,915,513	45.57	282
The Olive Tree (Ulivo)	16,019,388	43.15	183
Italy of Values (IdV)	1,487,287	4.01	0
European Democracy (DE)	1,310,119	3.53	0
Bonino List (LB)	457,117	1.23	0
South Tyrolean People's Party–The Olive Tree	190,556	0.51	5
South Tyrolean People's Party (SVP)	173,735	0.47	3
Venetian Front League (LFV)	173,618	0.47	0
Tricolour Flame (FT)	121,527	0.33	0
With Illy for Trieste	78,284	0.21	1
La Bassa in the Parliament	26,151	0.07	0
Aosta Valley (VdA)	25,577	0.07	1
Autonomist Socialists	24,341	0.07	0
Democrats of the Left (Aosta Valley)	20,452	0.06	0
Southern Action League (LAM)	19,366	0.05	0
Buonanno	19,046	0.05	0
National Social Front (FSN)	16,202	0.04	0
Forza Italia – Northern League (Aosta Valley)	16,049	0.04	0
European Republicans Movement (MRE)	15,600	0.04	0
European Populars	13,447	0.04	0
Greens Greens	13,220	0.04	0
Amadu List	12,233	0.03	0
New Italian Socialist Party (NPSI)	9,663	0.03	0
Movement of Freedoms	9,006	0.02	0
Camonica Valley – Basta!	8,257	0.02	0
People's List	8,091	0.02	0
Movement for the Confederation of the Communists	6,777	0.02	0
Alternative List	6,612	0.02	0
New Force (FN)	6,294	0.02	0
We Sicilians	6,121	0.02	0
National Alliance (Aosta Valley)	4,464	0.01	0
Third Pole for Autonomy	3,491	0.01	0
Upper Milanese People	1,409	0.00	0
Total	37,259,705	100.00	475
Source: Ministry of the Interior

Proportional
Party	Votes	%	Seats
Forza Italia (FI)	10,923,431	29.43	62
Democrats of the Left (DS)	6,151,154	16.57	31
Democracy is Freedom (DL)	5,391,827	14.52	27
National Alliance (AN)	4,463,205	12.02	24
Communist Refoundation Party (PRC)	1,868,659	5.03	11
Northern League (LN)	1,464,301	3.94	0
Italy of Values (IdV)	1,443,725	3.89	0
White Flower (CCD–CDU)	1,194,040	3.22	0
European Democracy (DE)	888,269	2.39	0
Bonino List (LB)	832,213	2.24	0
The Sunflower (FdV–SDI)	805,340	2.17	0
Party of Italian Communists (PdCI)	620,859	1.67	0
New Italian Socialist Party (NPSI)	353,269	0.95	0
South Tyrolean People's Party (SVP)	200,059	0.54	0
Tricolour Flame (FT)	143,963	0.39	0
Venetian Front League (LFV)	74,353	0.20	0
Pensioners' Party (PP)	68,349	0.18	0
Sardinian Action Party–Sardigna Natzione (PSd'Az–SN)	34,412	0.09	0
New Country	34,193	0.09	0
Abolizione Scorporo	26,917	0.07	0
Southern Action League (LAM)	23,779	0.06	0
National Social Front (FSN)	22,985	0.06	0
Greens Greens	18,262	0.05	0
New Force (FN)	13,622	0.04	0
Amadu List	11,517	0.03	0
European Republicans Movement (MRE)	7,997	0.02	0
We Sicilians (NS)	7,637	0.02	0
Movement of Freedoms	6,754	0.02	0
Free and Strong	6,722	0.02	0
Autonomist Socialists	6,492	0.02	0
Basta!	6,332	0.02	0
Movement for the Confederation of the Communists	5,244	0.01	0
Third Pole for Autonomy	2,915	0.01	0
Total	37,122,776	100.00	155
Invalid/blank/unassigned votes	2,962,621	–	–
Total	40,085,397	–	–
Registered voters/turnout	49,256,295	81.38	–
Source: Ministry of the Interior

Popular vote (First-past-the-post)
CdL	45.57%
Olive Tree	43.15%
IdV	4.01%
DE	3.53%
LB	1.23%
Others	2.89%

Popular vote (Proportional)
FI	29.43%
DS	16.57%
DL	14.52%
AN	12.02%
PRC	5.03%
LN	3.94%
IdV	3.89%
CCD–CDU	3.22%
DE	2.39%
LB	2.24%
FdV–SDI	2.17%
PdCI	1.67%
Others	2.90%

==== FPTP and proportional results by constituency ====
Constituency	Total seats	Seats won	
Constituency	Total seats	CdL	Ulivo
Abruzzo	11	5	6
Aosta Valley	1		1
Apulia	34	22	12
Basilicata	5		5
Calabria	17	11	6
Campania 1	25	15	10
Campania 2	22	14	8
Emilia-Romagna	32	2	30
Friuli-Venezia Giulia	10	8	2
Lazio 1	32	13	19
Lazio 2	11	11	
Liguria	14	5	9
Lombardy 1	31	29	2
Lombardy 2	32	32	
Lombardy 3	11	9	2
Marche	12	2	10
Molise	3	2	1
Piedmont 1	19	4	15
Piedmont 2	17	16	1
Sardinia	14	9	5
Sicily 1	20	20	
Sicily 2	21	21	
Trentino-Alto Adige	8		8
Tuscany	29	2	27
Umbria	7		7
Veneto 1	22	20	2
Veneto 2	15	10	5
Total	475	282	193

Constituency	Total seats	Seats won		
Constituency	Total seats	CdL	Ulivo	PRC
Abruzzo	3	2	1	
Apulia	10	6	3	1
Basilicata	2	1	1	
Calabria	6	3	3	
Campania 1	9	5	3	1
Campania 2	7	4	2	1
Emilia-Romagna	9	4	4	1
Friuli-Venezia Giulia	3	2	1	
Lazio 1	10	4	5	1
Lazio 2	4	3	1	
Liguria	6	2	3	1
Lombardy 1	10	5	4	1
Lombardy 2	10	5	4	1
Lombardy 3	4	3	1	
Marche	4	2	2	
Molise	1	1		
Piedmont 1	6	4	1	1
Piedmont 2	6	4	2	
Sardinia	4	2	2	
Sicily 1	7	5	2	
Sicily 2	7	4	3	
Trentino-Alto Adige	2	1	1	
Tuscany	10	5	4	1
Umbria	2	2		
Veneto 1	8	4	3	1
Veneto 2	5	3	2	
Total	155	86	58	11

=== Senate of the Republic ===
==== Overall results ====
← Summary of the 13 May 2001 Senate of the Republic election results →
Coalition	Party	First-past-the-post			Proportional (Seats)	Total seats	+/–
Coalition	Party	Votes	%	Seats	Proportional (Seats)	Total seats	+/–
House of Freedoms	Forza Italia (FI)	14.406.519	42.57	152	24	82	+40
House of Freedoms	National Alliance (AN)	14.406.519	42.57	152	24	45	+2
House of Freedoms	White Flower (CCD–CDU)	14.406.519	42.57	152	24	29	+4
House of Freedoms	Northern League (LN)	14.406.519	42.57	152	24	17	−10
House of Freedoms	Italian Republican Party (PRI)	14.406.519	42.57	152	24	1	+1
House of Freedoms	New Italian Socialist Party (NPSI)	14.406.519	42.57	152	24	1	New
House of Freedoms	Tricolour Flame (FT)	14.406.519	42.57	152	24	1	–
House of Freedoms	Total seats					176	–
The Olive Tree	Democrats of the Left (DS)	13,282,495	39.22	72	51	64	−38
The Olive Tree	Democracy is Freedom (DL)	13,282,495	39.22	72	51	43	−5
The Olive Tree	Federation of the Greens (FdV)	13,282,495	39.22	72	51	8	−6
The Olive Tree	Italian Democratic Socialists (SDI)	13,282,495	39.22	72	51	6	–
The Olive Tree	Party of Italian Communists (PdCI)	13,282,495	39.22	72	51	2	New
The Olive Tree	South Tyrolean People's Party (SVP)	13,282,495	39.22	72	51	1	–
The Olive Tree	Independent candidates	13,282,495	39.22	72	51	4	–
The Olive Tree	Total seats					128	–
Communist Refoundation Party (PRC)		1,708,707	5.04	0	4	4	−6
European Democracy (DE)		1,066,908	3.15	0	2	2	New
Italy of Values (IdV)		1,140,489	3.37	0	1	1	New
Bonino List (LB)		677,725	2.00	0	0	0	−1
League for Autonomy – Lombard League (LAL)		308,559	0.91	0	1	1	+1
Tricolour Flame (FT)		340,221	1.00	0	0	0	−1
Venetian Front League (LFV)		138,134	0.41	0	0	0	New
South Tyrolean People's Party (SVP)		126.177	0.37	2	0	2	±0
Va' pensiero Padania		119,058	0.35	0	0	0	New
National Social Front (FSN)		98,132	0.29	0	0	0	New
Autonomist Socialists – European Democracy (SA–DE)		79,002	0.23	0	0	0	New
Pensioners' Party (PP)		39,545	0.12	0	0	0	±0
New Force (FN)		78,572	0.23	0	0	0	New
Greens Greens		35,743	0.11	0	0	0	±0
Sardinian Action Party – Sardigna Natzione (PSd'Az–SN)		32,822	0.10	0	0	0	−1
Aosta Valley (VdA)		32,429	0.10	0	1	1	±0
Filograna List for Salento		21,857	0.06	0	0	0	New
We Sicilians (NS)		20,761	0.06	0	0	0	±0
Southern Action League (LAM)		19,914	0.06	0	0	0	±0
Basta!		19,913	0.06	0	0	0	New
Liberal Popular Party		10,301	0.03	0	0	0	New
Amadu List		9,203	0.03	0	0	0	New
Alternative List		7,704	0.02	0	0	0	–
Forza Chiappetta		6,932	0.02	0	0	0	New
Die Freiheitlichen (dF)		5,354	0.02	0	0	0	–
Franco Greco List		4,284	0.01	0	0	0	New
Movement of Freedoms		4,023	0.01	0	0	0	New
Third Pole for Autonomy		2,392	0.01	0	0	0	New
Movement for the Confederation of the Communists		2.159	0.01	0	0	0	New
Justice and Progress		950	0.00	0	0	0	New
Grand Ducal Tuscany		625	0.00	0	0	0	New
Italian Constitutional Party (PACI)		175	0.00	0	0	0	New
Independents		4,975	0.02	0	0	0	New
Total		32,624,584	100.00	232	83	315	±0
Source: Ministry of the Interior

Popular vote
CdL	42.53%
Olive Tree	38.70%
PRC	5.04%
IdV	3.37%
DE	3.15%
LB	2.00%
Others	5.21%

==== FPTP and proportional results by constituency ====
Constituency	Total seats	Seats won		
Constituency	Total seats	CdL	Ulivo	Others
Piedmont	17	12	5	
Aosta Valley	1			1
Lombardy	35	33	2	
Trentino-Alto Adige	6	1	5	
Veneto	17	16	1	
Friuli-Venezia Giulia	5	5		
Liguria	6	2	4	
Emilia-Romagna	15	1	14	
Tuscany	14	1	13	
Umbria	5		5	
Marche	6	2	4	
Lazio	21	15	6	
Abruzzo	5	4	1	
Molise	2	1	1	
Campania	22	14	8	
Apulia	16	15	1	
Basilicata	5		5	
Calabria	8	6	2	
Sicily	20	20		
Sardinia	6	4	2	
Total	232	152	79	1

Constituency	Total seats	Seats won			
Constituency	Total seats	Ulivo	CdL	PRC	Others
Piedmont	6	4	2		
Lombardy	12	9		1	2
Trentino-Alto Adige	1		1		
Veneto	6	6			
Friuli-Venezia Giulia	2	2			
Liguria	3	1	2		
Emilia-Romagna	6		5	1	
Tuscany	5		4	1	
Umbria	2		2		
Marche	2	1	1		
Lazio	7	5	2		
Abruzzo	2	2			
Campania	8	4	2	1	1
Apulia	6	6			
Basilicata	2		2		
Calabria	3	3			
Sicily	7	6			1
Sardinia	3	2	1		
Total	83	51	24	4	4

=== Leaders' races ===
2001 Italian general election (C): Milan Centre
Candidate	Coalition	Party	Votes	%
Silvio Berlusconi	House of Freedoms	FI	42,098	53.66
Gianni Rivera	The Olive Tree	Dem	28,651	36.52
Benedetto Della Vedova		LB	4,874	6.21
Adriano Ciccioni		IdV	2,835	3.61
Total			78,458	100.0
Turnout			81,412	80.39
Centre-right hold				
Source: Ministry of the Interior

2001 Italian general election (C): Rome – Praenestine
Candidate	Coalition	Party	Votes	%
Francesco Rutelli	The Olive Tree	DL	36,457	56.73
Elio Vito	House of Freedoms	FI	25,463	39.62
Pietro Tagliatesta		IdV	2,348	3.65
Total			64,268	100.0
Turnout			66,479	77.44
Centre-left hold				
Source: Ministry of the Interior

== See also ==
- Politics of Italy
- History of the Italian Republic#Second Republic (1992–present)
