= European Democracy =

Defunct political party in Italy

European Democracy Democrazia Europea
- Leader: Sergio D'Antoni
- Founded: 11 February 2001
- Dissolved: 6 December 2002
- Split from: Italian People's Party
- Merged into: Union of Christian and Centre Democrats
- Ideology: Christian democracy
- Political position: Centre

European Democracy (Italian: Democrazia Europea, DE) was a minor Christian-democratic, centrist political party in Italy.

== History ==
European Democracy was founded in 2001 by Sergio D'Antoni (former leader of the Italian Confederation of Workers' Trade Unions), Giulio Andreotti and Ortensio Zecchino, all three splitters from the Italian People's Party. Many ex-members of Lega Nord, including Vito Gnutti (former Minister of Industry) and Domenico Comino (and floor leader in the Chamber of Deputies).

In the 2001 general election the party scored 2.3% on a stand-alone list, winning only two seats in the Senate. In December 2002 it was merged with the Christian Democratic Centre and the United Christian Democrats to form the Union of Christian and Centre Democrats (UDC). Sergio D'Antoni became vice-secretary of the new party.

== Electoral results ==
=== Italian Parliament ===
Chamber of Deputies
Election year	Votes	%	Seats	+/−	Leader
2001	888,269 (9th)	2.4	0 / 630	–	Sergio D'Antoni

Senate of the Republic
Election year	Votes	%	Seats	+/−	Leader
2001	1,066,908 (4th)	3.2	2 / 315	–	Sergio D'Antoni
