= Campania 2 (Chamber of Deputies constituency) =

- Chamber of Deputies; Electoral constituency
- Region: Campania
- Electorate: 2,131,555 (2022) 2,158,084 (2018)
- Major settlements: Avellino, Benevento, Caserta, Salerno

Current constituency
- Created: 1993
- Seats: 18
- Members: M5S (3); FI (2); PD (2); Lega (2); FdI (6); NM (1); AIV (1); AVS (1)

Campania 2 is one of the 29 constituencies (Italian: circoscrizioni) represented in the Chamber of Deputies, the lower house of the Italian parliament. The constituency currently elects 18 deputies. Its boundaries correspond to those of the provinces of Avellino, Benevento, Caserta and Salerno, within the Campania region. The electoral system uses a parallel voting system, which act as a mixed system, with 3/8 of seats allocated using a first-past-the-post electoral system and 5/8 using a proportional method, with one round of voting.

The constituency was first established by the Mattarella law on 4 August 1993 and later confirmed by the Calderoli law on 21 December 2005 and by the Rosato law on 3 November 2017. The current borders of the districts were created as a result of the 2020 Italian Constitutional Referendum.

== Members of the Parliament ==
=== Legislature XIX (2022-Present) ===
Single-member districts
District			Deputy	Coalition	Party	Ref
N.	Name	Map	Deputy	Coalition	Party	Ref
01	Aversa		Gerolamo Cangiano	Centre-right	Brothers of Italy	
02	Caserta		Carmen Letizia Giorgianni	Centre-right	Brothers of Italy	
03	Benevento		Francesco Maria Rubano	Centre-right	Forza Italia	
04	Avellino		Gianfranco Rotondi	Centre-right	Brothers of Italy	
05	Scafati		Imma Vietri	Centre-right	Brothers of Italy	
06	Salerno		Giuseppe Bicchielli	Centre-right	Us Moderates	
07	Eboli		Attilio Pierro	Centre-right	League	

Multi-member districts
District			Deputy	Coalition	Party	Ref
N.	Name	Map	Deputy	Coalition	Party	Ref
01	Campania 1 - P01		Enrica Alifano	Five Star Movement		
01	Campania 1 - P01		Marco Cerreto	Centre-right	Brothers of Italy	
01	Campania 1 - P01		Stefano Graziano	Centre-left	Democratic Party	
01	Campania 1 - P01		Agostino Santillo	Five Star Movement		
01	Campania 1 - P01		Gianpiero Zinzi	Centre-right	League	
02	Campania 1 - P02		Edmondo Cirielli	Centre-right	Brothers of Italy	
02	Campania 1 - P02		Antonio D'Alessio	Action - Italia Viva		
02	Campania 1 - P02		Piero de Luca	Centre-left	Democratic Party	
02	Campania 1 - P02		Tullio Ferrante	Centre-right	Forza Italia	
02	Campania 1 - P02		Michele Gubitosa	Five Star Movement		
02	Campania 1 - P02		Francesco Mari	Centre-left	Greens and Left Alliance	

=== 2018–present ===
Single-member districts
District			Deputy	Coalition	Party
N.	Name	Map	Deputy	Coalition	Party
01	Benevento		Angela Ianaro	Five Star Movement	
02	Ariano Irpino		Generoso Maraia	Five Star Movement	
03	Caserta		Antonio Del Monaco	Five Star Movement	
04	Santa Maria Capua Vetere		Giuseppe Buompane	Five Star Movement	
05	Aversa		Nicola Grimaldi	Five Star Movement	
06	Avellino		Michele Gubitosa	Five Star Movement	
07	Scafati		Virginia Villani	Five Star Movement	
08	Salerno		Nicola Provenza	Five Star Movement	
09	Battipaglia		Nicola Acunzo	Five Star Movement	
10	Agropoli		Marzia Ferraioli	Centre-right	Forza Italia

Multi-member districts
District			Party	Deputy
N.	Name	Map	Party	Deputy
01	Campania 2 – 01		Five Star Movement	Carlo Sibilia
01	Campania 2 – 01		Five Star Movement	Maria Pallini
01	Campania 2 – 01		Five Star Movement	Pasquale Maglione
01	Campania 2 – 01		Forza Italia	Cosimo Sibilia
01	Campania 2 – 01		Democratic Party	Umberto Del Basso De Caro
02	Campania 2 – 02		Five Star Movement	Margherita Del Sesto
02	Campania 2 – 02		Five Star Movement	Giovanni Russo
02	Campania 2 – 02		Five Star Movement	Marianna Iorio
02	Campania 2 – 02		Forza Italia	Carlo Sarro
02	Campania 2 – 02		Democratic Party	Piero De Luca
03	Campania 2 – 03		Five Star Movement	Angelo Tofalo
03	Campania 2 – 03		Five Star Movement	Anna Bilotti
03	Campania 2 – 03		Five Star Movement	Cosimo Adelizzi
03	Campania 2 – 03		Forza Italia	Vincenzo Fasano
03	Campania 2 – 03		Forza Italia	Luigi Casciello
03	Campania 2 – 03		Democratic Party	Marco Minniti
03	Campania 2 – 03		League	Gianluca Cantalamessa
03	Campania 2 – 03		Brothers of Italy	Edmondo Cirielli
03	Campania 2 – 03		Free and Equal	Federico Conte
