= 2019 Democratic Party (Italy) leadership election =

2019 Democratic Party leadership election
- 3 March 2019
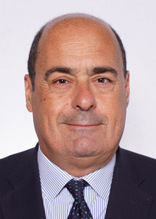

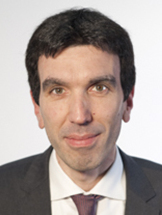

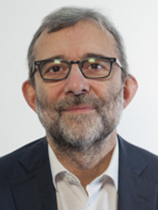
Nominee	Nicola Zingaretti	Maurizio Martina	Roberto Giachetti
Party	Democratic Party	Democratic Party	Democratic Party
Delegate count	653	228	119
Popular vote	1,035,955	345,318	188,355
Percentage	66.0%	22.0%	12.0%
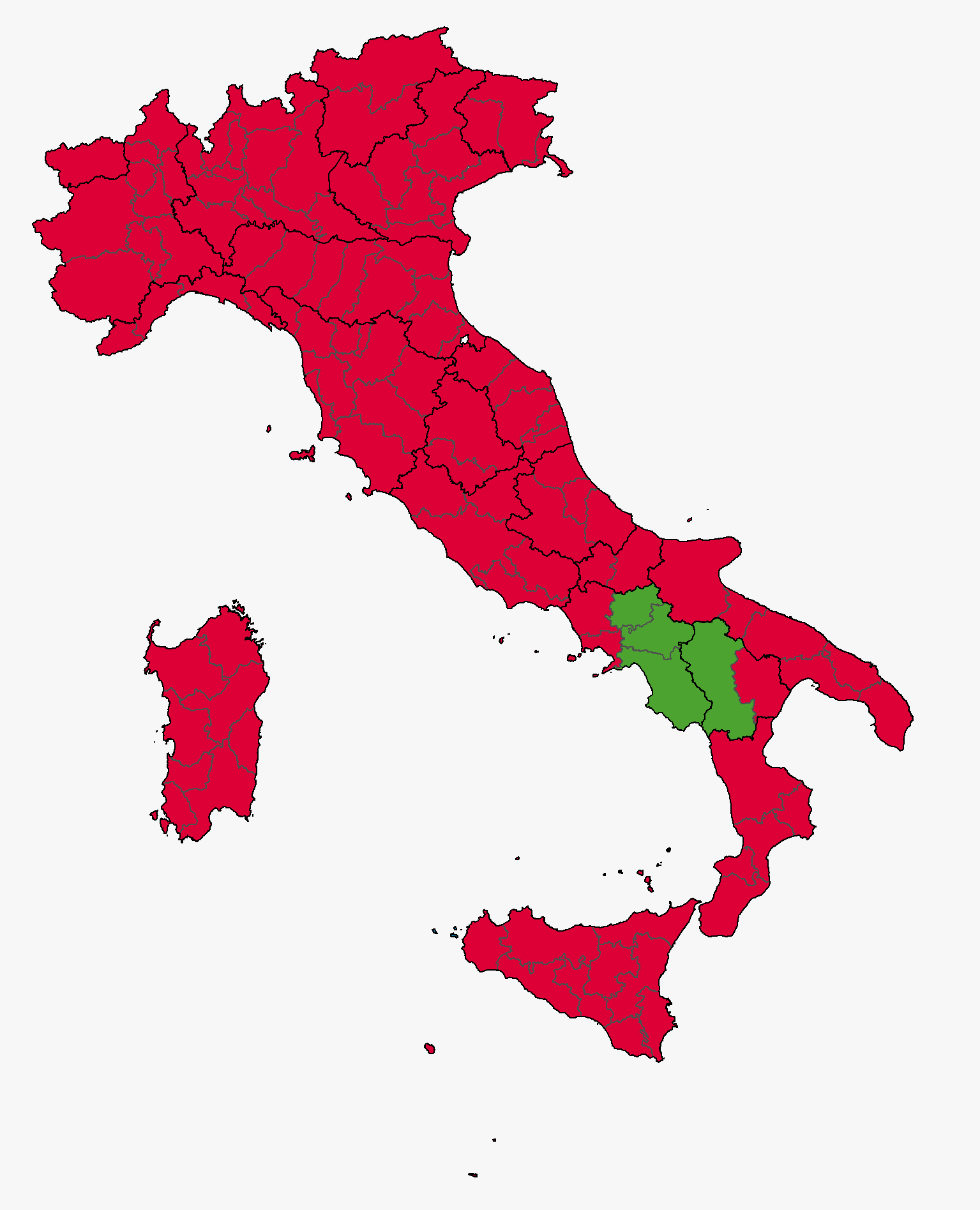
- Primary election results map. Red denotes provinces with a Zingaretti plurality and Green denotes those with a Martina plurality.
Secretary before election
Maurizio Martina
Elected Secretary
Nicola Zingaretti

The 2019 Democratic Party leadership election was an open primary election held on 3 March 2019. The election was triggered by the resignation of Matteo Renzi on 12 March 2018, following the party's defeat at the 2018 general election. Vice Secretary Maurizio Martina was appointed Secretary in July 2018 by the National Assembly, but he resigned after few months to officially start the party's congress.

Six candidates were successfully nominated to stand in the Club's Conventions, held in January: Nicola Zingaretti, Maurizio Martina, Roberto Giachetti, Francesco Boccia, Dario Corallo and Maria Saladino. The first three candidates advanced to the open primary election scheduled in March, where Zingaretti won by a landslide getting more than 66% of votes.

== Electoral process ==
The process consists of two phases: the first one in which only the members of the Democratic Party have the right to vote, thus determining the candidates who will enter the second round, where the center-left sympathizers are able to vote too. The Democratic Party is currently the only party in Italy that allows the non-members to elect the Secretary by open primary.

The term of office of the Secretary is usually four years, along with the National Assembly, but when the former resign in advance, the National Assembly can choose between electing another Secretary (until the natural expiration of the mandate is reached) or the early dissolution of the National Assembly itself and the convocation of a new leadership election.

With the official resignation presented by Secretary Maurizio Martina on 30 October, the President must gather the members of the National Assembly within a month, which was held on 17 November on Rome after the convocation of the President, Matteo Orfini, officially starting the primaries. On the same day, the National Assembly elects the members of the "National Committee for the Congress" (which will act in place of the elected bodies until the end of the leadership election), that the National Assembly has to follow, through the approval of the "Rules of the Primaries" where are stated the rules, the dates and the procedure that the party must perform for the process of the leadership election. The National Committee also handle the internal disputes and appeals during the primary election.

After the assignment of the National Committee, their members elect a President to coordinate the activities, and they write the rules and the dates and propose them to the National Board. The election must take place within four months following the presentation of the resignation of the Secretary. On 28 November, the National Board unanimously approved the proposals made by the National Committee, setting the date of the leadership election on 3 March.

=== Requirements for candidacy ===
As stated in the Rules of the Primaries, to officially take part in the competition, applying candidates are required to gather signatures, by 6:00 PM on 12 December 2018, from either:

- 10% of the members of the outgoing National Assembly;
- 1,500 to 2,000 registered members of the Democratic Party located in no less than five regions belonging to at least three of the five Italian constituencies for the European Parliament.

Along with the signatures, candidates must provide their manifesto. In a few days, the National Committee will announce the official list of the candidates and will carry out a draw to generate the official order of presentation of the candidates in the ballots.

Admitted candidates
Candidate	Status
Francesco Boccia	check
Dario Corallo	check
Roberto Giachetti	check
Maurizio Martina	check
Maria Saladino	check
Nicola Zingaretti	check

=== Closed primary ===
To be able to vote in this stage is required to be a member of the Democratic Party. The registration on the local branch closed on 28 November but it is still possible, if the member enrolled in for the previous year, to renew their membership of the party until the day their Circle Convention takes place. Along with the enrollment in the local branches, the National Committee approved the online enrollment, available only between 3 and 21 December for those who weren't members of the Democratic Party in the previous year. To prevent any electoral fraud, it is admitted to enroll only two people per credit card.

Once the candidates are validated by the National Committee, the local branches, in a day choose individually by every branch between 7 and 23 January 2019, gather their registered members in the Circle Conventions to talk about the candidates, their manifesto and to introduce the delegates who will take part at the Provincial Conventions. The number of the delegates elected per branch is fixed by the Provincial Committee, on the basis of the average membership of the branch between 2016 and 2017. Along with the national candidate, the members will vote for the delegates linked to every candidate.

The elected provincial delegates will take part in the Provincial Conventions in a date set between 29 or 30 January, to elect the delegates for the National Convention, each linked to a national candidate. Just like the Circle Conventions, the number of the delegates elected for every province are fixed by the National Committee, half on the basis of the result of the party in the latest election and half on the average membership of the province between 2016 and 2017. The National Convention will take place on 2 February; it's composed of 1,000 delegates, and it will announce the results of the votes that will be held in the Circle Conventions and will list the candidates admitted to the open primary and the National Assembly, according to one of these conditions:

- the three most voted candidates above 5% of votes;
- a candidate who gets at least 15% of votes in five different regions.

=== Open primary ===
Those interested in voting on 3 March for the election of the Secretary may present themselves at the polling station set up in a branch of the Democratic Party, where they can vote for the candidates, voting for one of the regional lists of delegates (who are elected proportionally to the votes obtained) for the National Assembly linked to the candidates. To take part in the election, voters have to:

- show an ID card;
- show a voter ID card (not requested to those who must enroll themselves online);
- make a donation of €2 minimum (the members of the party are exempted, showing instead their membership card);
- sign up a statement pledging to support the party and sign up the register members of the voters (not requested to the members of the party);
- preregister themselves online (mandatory for students and workers residing out of town, off-site citizens, minors between 16 and 18 years old, EU citizens, foreign nationals with a permit to stay in Italy).

The renewed National Assembly meet up on 17 March to declare the elected Secretary, if he obtained the absolute majority of the delegates, otherwise, the delegates of the National Assembly will hold a run-off with a vote by secret ballot between the two most-voted candidates and determine the winner.

=== Timetable ===
Timetable of events for the 2019 Democratic Party leadership election
Date(s)	Event
17 November	The National Assembly elects the National Committee for the Congress. Start of the primaries.
28 November	The National Board approve the rules of the Primaries.
28 November	Enrollment on the local branch for new members closed.
3–21 December	Online enrollment for new members.
12 December	Presentation of the candidacies supported by at least 1,500 signatures.
7–23 January	Closed primaries take place in Circle Conventions.
29–30 January	Provincial Conventions take place.
3 February	National Convention take place in Rome. Results of the first round are announced.
3 March	Open primaries to elect the Secretary and the National Assembly.
17 March	The National Assembly announces the winner. If no one gets the majority of the delegates, a run-off is required.

== Background ==
In the 2018 general election the Democratic Party, led by former Prime Minister Matteo Renzi, obtained its worst result ever: 18.7% of the vote, well behind the Five Star Movement (32.7%) and narrowly ahead of the League (17.4%). Following his party's defeat, Renzi resigned from secretary and his deputy Maurizio Martina started functioning as acting secretary.

After two months of negotiations and the refusal of the PD to join forces with the M5S, the latter and the League formed a yellow-green government, under Prime Minister Giuseppe Conte, a M5S-proposed independent. The PD thus returned to opposition after virtually seven years and experienced some internal turmoil as its internal factions started to re-position themselves in the new context. Both Paolo Gentiloni and Dario Franceschini distanced from Renzi, while Carlo Calenda, a former minister in Renzi's and Gentiloni's governments who had joined the party soon after the election, proposed to merge the PD into a larger "republican front". However, according to several observers, Renzi's grip over the party was still strong and he was still the PD's leader behind the scenes. In July 2018 Martina was elected secretary by the party's national assembly and a new leadership election was scheduled for the first semester of 2019.

== Campaign ==
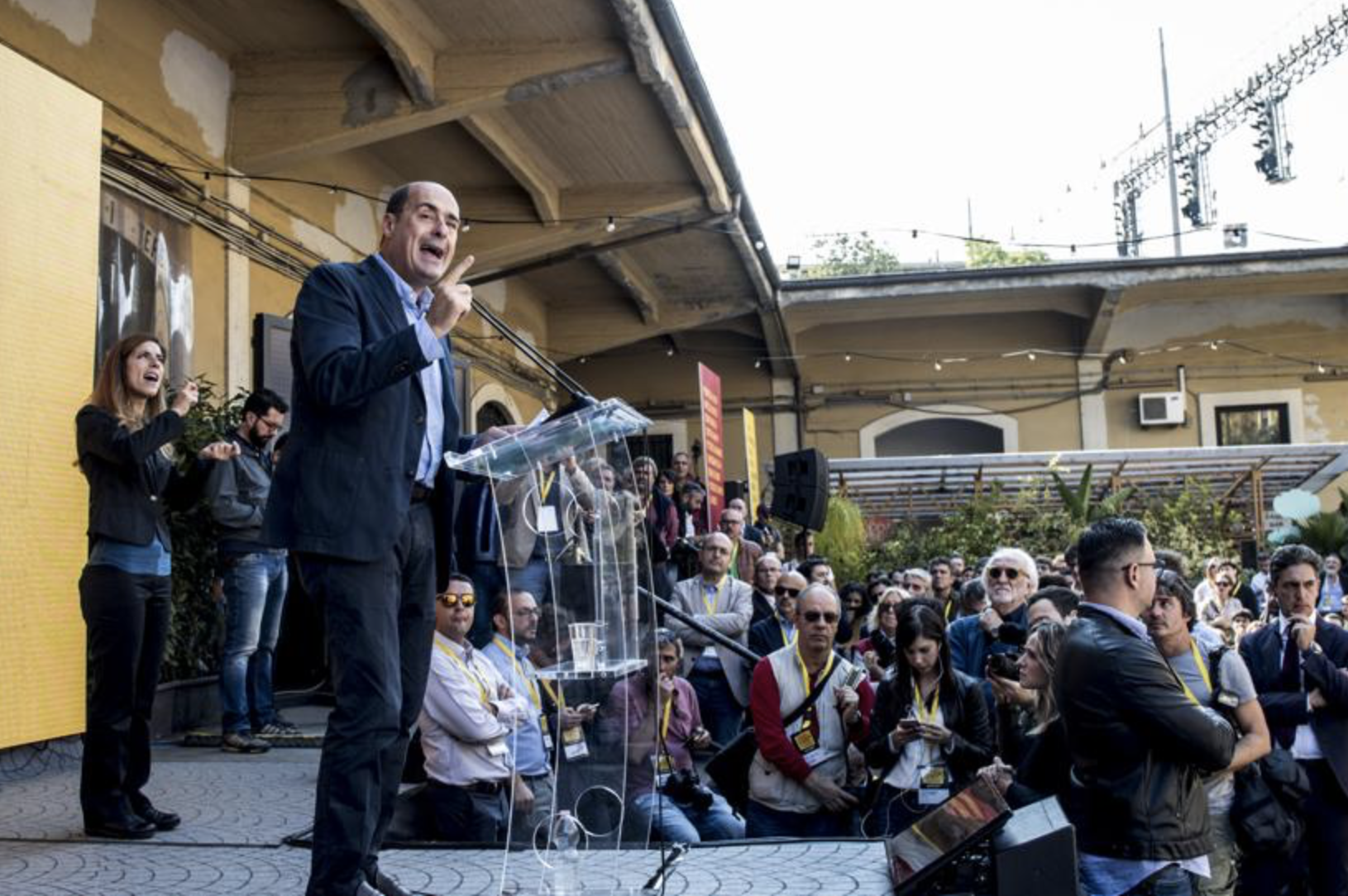
Nicola Zingaretti during the electoral campaign in October 2018

On 7 July 2018, the President of Lazio region, Nicola Zingaretti, announced his intention to run as party's secretary. Zingaretti was a former member of the Italian Communist Party (PCI) and Democratic Party of the Left (PDS), who served as leader of the Left Youth, the youth-wing of the PDS. He is considered a social democrat and one of the most prominent members of the PD's left-wing; for his leftist ideas, some journalists and political analysts compared him to Bernie Sanders and Jeremy Corbyn. Zingaretti's campaign was based on a social democratic platform, whose aim was to abandon the social liberal and centrist policies promoted by Matteo Renzi and to move the Democratic Party more on the left. The campaign's main themes were social justice and fight to economic inequality; Zingaretti was supported, among others, by former Prime Minister Paolo Gentiloni, who described him as a "brave candidate who will open a new season for the centre-left" and Dario Franceschini, the former Minister of Culture and leader of AreaDem, one of the main faction of the party.

On 4 October, Senator Matteo Richetti, who between 2017 and 2018 served as Spokesman of the PD, announced his bid for party's leadership. He was a former member of The Daisy (DL) and a close advisor of Matteo Renzi, however he later assumed a more critical view on his premiership. Richetti is considered a centrist and social liberal politician; he is also the leader of Harambee, a PD faction founded in April 2018 with roots in the Christian left.

On 6 October, Cesare Damiano, former Minister of Labour in the second government of Romano Prodi, announced his candidacy as party's secretary. Damiano is a democratic socialist and former trade unionist. He has often been strongly against the policies promoted by the previous party's leadership and he wants to bring back the party on the left-wing. However, on the same day of the announcement, he added that he could withdraw his candidacy, following an agreement with Zingaretti.

On 8 October, Francesco Boccia, an economist and member of the Chamber of Deputies since 2008, presented his candidacy as new party's secretary. Boccia has been a long-time opponent of Renzi and Gentiloni and a close advisor of Michele Emiliano, current governor of Apulia region and former candidate in the 2017 leadership election. Boccia has always supported an alliance between the PD and the Five Star Movement, which was opposed by all the other candidates.

On 18 November 2018, Marco Minniti, the former Italian Minister of the Interior from 2016 to 2018, announced his candidacy as PD's leader. Minniti was a former member of the Italian Communist Party, however while in office, he promoted restricted policies on immigration and social security, for which he has been often criticized by left-wing intellectuals and writers, like Roberto Saviano. Minniti was supported by Matteo Renzi, former Prime Minister and party's leader, who led a liberal and centrist faction within the PD. He was also supported by former Minister of Economic Development, Carlo Calenda, who was considered by many a strong potential candidate for the leadership election, and the former Minister of Economy and Finance, Pier Carlo Padoan.

On 22 November, incumbent Secretary Maurizio Martina presented his candidacy as party's leader. Martina is a social democrat, member of the PD's left-wing, who was elected Secretary after the resignation of Matteo Renzi in March 2018. He also served as Italian Minister of Agriculture in Renzi and Gentiloni's governments. He was supported, among others, by Graziano Delrio, one of party's main bigwigs and former Minister of Infrastructures and Transports, who was very close to Renzi until 2017, but from whom he later distanced himself. One of Martina's main proposals is the introduction of a wealth tax for the so-called "super-rich" people.

On the next day of the Democratic National Committee meeting on 23 November, member of the Chamber of Deputies Lia Quartapelle launched a petition to move up the date of the primary election to January instead of 3 March. The proposal met the support of the former Prime Minister Paolo Gentiloni, Marianna Madia, Carlo Calenda Debora Serracchiani, Pierfrancesco Majorino and the Mayor of Bergamo, Giorgio Gori. Even the candidates Maurizio Martina and Matteo Richetti welcomed the proposal, while Francesco Boccia strongly rejected the idea.

The race was characterized by many withdrawals. On 27 November, Senator Matteo Richetti announced his withdrawal from the race, endorsing Maurizio Martina. The day before his withdrawal, Graziano Delrio, former Minister of Infrastructures and Transports, appealed Richetti on Facebook to endorse Martina's candidacy. Richetti was selected by Martina as his deputy secretary candidate. While, on 5 December, 17 days after having announced his candidacy, Marco Minniti withdrew from the race, saying to do so in order to facilitate the path of the party primaries and with the sole intent to encourage the election of an authoritative secretary; in January 2019, Minniti endorsed Zingaretti. On 11 December, Cesare Damiano withdrew from the race, endorsing Zingaretti, stating that his choice was motivated by a sense of unity and responsibility towards the party.

On the same day Roberto Giachetti and Anna Ascani, with a live footage, announced their joint candidacy asking to their viewers to send them 1,500 signatures by the next day. Giachetti is a former Radical, member of the Chamber of Deputies since 2001 and former centre-left candidate for mayor of Rome in 2016 election, while Ascani is a 31 years old member of the Chamber of Deputies for Umbria. They are both strong supporter of Matteo Renzi, that, after Minniti's retirement, refused to endorse another candidate and decided to run themselves, aiming to represent all the renziani area.

After the National Convention on 3 February, which saw Zingaretti, Martina and Giachetti advanced to the open primary election, Boccia endorsed Zingaretti, while Saladino endorsed Martina.

== Debates ==
There was one leadership election debate held on television.

2019 Democratic Party leadership debates
Programme	Date	Moderator	Channel	Participants		
P Participant. N Non-invitee. A Absent invitee.				Zingaretti	Martina	Giachetti
Il Confronto	28 February 2019; 13:00	Fabio Vitale	Sky TG24	P	P	P

== Candidates ==
=== Major candidates ===
Portrait	Name	Most recent position	Campaign logo	Slogan	Announced	Refs
	Nicola Zingaretti (1965– )	President of Lazio (2013–present) Other positions: President of the Province of Rome (2008–2012); Member of the European Parliament (2004–2009); President of the International Union of Socialist Youth (1995–1997); Secretary of the Left Youth (1992–1995)	(nicolazingaretti.it)	Prima le Persone (People First)	7 July 2018	
	Francesco Boccia (1968– )	Member of the Chamber of Deputies (2008–present) Other positions: None	(francescoboccia.com)	A porte aperte (With doors open)	8 October 2018	
	Maurizio Martina (1978– )	Secretary of the Democratic Party (2018) Other positions: Member of the Chamber of Deputies (2018–present); Minister of Agriculture (2014–2018)	(mauriziomartina.it)	Fianco a Fianco (Side by Side)	22 November 2018	
	Roberto Giachetti (1961– )	Member of the Chamber of Deputies (2001–present) Other positions: Vice President of the Chamber of Deputies (2013–2018)	(robertogiachetti.it)	Sempre Avanti (Always Forward)	11 December 2018	

=== Minor candidates ===
- Dario Corallo — Member of the National Secretariat of the Young Democrats (2016–present)
- Maria Saladino — Candidate for the European election of 2014 in the Southern Italy constituency

=== Endorsements ===
==== Nicola Zingaretti ====
Nicola Zingaretti

Former Prime Ministers

- Massimo D'Alema — former Prime Minister (1998–2000); former Deputy Prime Minister of Italy (2006–2008); former Minister of Foreign Affairs (2006–2008); former President of the Democrats of the Left (1998–2007); former Secretary of the Democrats of the Left (1998); former Secretary of the Democratic Party of the Left (1994–1998)
- Paolo Gentiloni — former Prime Minister (2016–2018); former Minister of Foreign Affairs (2014–2016); former Minister of Communications (2006–2008); Member of the Chamber of Deputies (2001–present)
- Enrico Letta — former Prime Minister (2013–2014); former Secretary of the Council of Ministers of Italy (2006–2008); former Minister of Industry, Commerce and Craftmanship (1999–2001); former Minister for the Community Policies (1998–1999); former Deputy Secretary of the Democratic Party (2009–2013)
- Romano Prodi — former Prime Minister (1996–1998; 2006–2008); former Minister of Industry, Commerce and Craftmanship (1978–1979); former President of the European Commission (1999–2004); former President of the Democratic Party (2007–2008)

Former Ministers

- Rosy Bindi — former Minister of Health (1996–2000); former Minister for Family (2006–2008); former member of the Chamber of Deputies (1994–2018)
- Cesare Damiano — former Minister of Labour and Social Policies (2006–2008); former member of the Chamber of Deputies (2006–2018)
- Piero Fassino — former Minister of Justice (2000-2001); former Mayor of Turin (2011-2016); Member of the Chamber of Deputies (2018–present; 1994-2011)
- Dario Franceschini — former Minister of Cultural Heritage and Activities (2014–2018); former Minister for Parliamentary Relations (2013–2014); former Secretary of the Democratic Party (2009); Member of the Chamber of Deputies (2001–present)
- Marianna Madia — former Minister of Public Administration (2014-2018; Member of the Chamber of Deputies (2008–present)
- Marco Minniti – former Minister of the Interior (2016–2018); Member of the Chamber of Deputies (2018–present; 2001–2013); Member of the Senate of the Republic (2013–2018)
- Andrea Orlando — former Minister of Justice (2014–2018); former Minister of the Environment (2013–2014); Member of the Chamber of Deputies (2006–present)
- Pier Carlo Padoan — former Minister of Economy and Finances (2014–2018); Member of the Chamber of Deputies (2018–present)
- Roberta Pinotti — former Minister of Defence (2014–2018); Member of the Senate of the Republic (2008–present); Member of the Chamber of Deputies (2001–2008)

Deputies

- Francesco Boccia
- Michele Bordo
- Paola De Micheli
- Rosa Maria Di Giorgi
- Alberto Losacco
- Roberto Morassut
- Lia Quartapelle
- Walter Verini

Former

- Massimiliano Smeriglio

Senators

- Anna Rossomando — Vicepresident of the Senate of the Republic (2018–present); Member of the Senate of the Republic (2018–present); Member of the Chamber of Deputies (2008–2018)
- Monica Cirinnà
- Antonio Misiani
- Luigi Zanda

Members of the European Parliament

- Goffredo Bettini

Presidents of Regions

- Stefano Bonaccini – President of Emilia-Romagna (2014–present); President of the Conference of the Regions and Autonomous Provinces (2015–present)
- Luca Ceriscioli — President of Marche (2015–present); Mayor of Pesaro (2004–2014)
- Michele Emiliano — President of Apulia (2015–present); Mayor of Bari (2004–2014)

Mayors (only provincial capitals)

- Antonio Battista — Mayor of Campobasso (2014–present)
- Michele De Pascale — Mayor of Ravenna (2016–present)
- Carlo Marino — Mayor of Caserta (2016–present)
- Virginio Merola — Mayor of Bologna (2011–present)
- Matteo Ricci — Mayor of Pesaro (2014–present); Vice President of the Democratic Party (2013–2017); President of the Province of Pesaro and Urbino (2009–2014)
- Alessandro Tambellini — Mayor of Lucca (2012–present)

Mayors (only cities with no less than 15,000 residents)

Luciano Andreotti, Gianluca Angelelli, Alberto Bellelli, Maino Benatti, David Bussagli, Emanuele Crestini, Simone Cretaro, Giacomo Cucini, Enzo Cuomo, Francesco De Rebotti, Paolo Festa, Emiliano Fossi, Alessandro Franchi, Giuseppe Germani, Matteo Gozzoli, Ilenia Malavasi, Maurizio Mangialardi, Nicola Marini, Vito Marotta, Simone Millozzi, Esterino Montino, Giuseppe Morini, Giulia Mugnai, Federica Nannetti, Lorenzo Piazzai, Antonio Pompeo, Mario Pupillo, Stefano Reggianini, Pierluigi Sanna, Roberto Solomita, Pietro Tidei, Alfio Todini

Other politicians

Silvana Amati, Gianni Cuperlo, Paolo D'Erasmo, Francesco De Angelis, Stefania Gasparini, Elisabetta Gualmini, Carlo Guccione, Vincenzo Insardà, Antonio Mastrovincenzo, Michele Mirabello, Giuliano Pisapia, Francesca Puglisi, Marina Sereni, Liana Serrani

Non-political personalities

- Roberto Andò, director, screenwriter, playwright and author
- Andrea Aquilanti, contemporary artist
- Stefania Barca, actress
- Andrea Barzini, director, screenwriter and producer
- Francesca Benedetti, actress
- Paolo Bonacelli, actor
- Edith Bruck, writer and director
- Flavio Bucci, actor
- Roberta Calandra, writer
- Gilberto Canu, writer
- Francesca Cappelletti, art history professor
- Paolo Carafa, classical archaeology professor
- Ada Carpi, writer
- Athina Cenci, actress, comedian and politician
- Adriana Citron
- Roberto Codini, teacher
- Maria Grazia Cogliati Dezza, psychiatrist
- Arnaldo Colasanti, writer
- Tilde Corsi, film producer
- Paolo Crepet psychiatrist and sociologist
- Massimo Dapporto, actor
- Maurizio De Giovanni, writer
- Domenico De Masi, sociologist
- Piera Degli Esposti, actress
- Andrea Delucchi
- Stefano di Battista, saxophonists
- Fabio Donato, economics professor
- Pietro Dufaux, vicepresident of a voluntary organisation
- Francesco Florenzano, writer
- Iaia Forte, actress
- Ludovico Fremont, actor
- Paolo Fresu, musician, composer and arranger
- Matteo Garrone, filmmaker
- Alessandro Gassmann, actor
- Pellegrino Giornale, teacher and journalist
- Monica Guerritore, actress
- Alessandro Haber, actor and film director
- Sergio Iagulli, editor
- Sabrina Knaflitz, actress
- Manuela Kustermann, actress
- Gabriele Lavia, actor and film director
- Marco Lodoli, writer and journalist
- Dacia Maraini, writer
- Simona Marchini, actress and television presenter
- Lorenzo Marone, writer
- Magda Mercatali, actress
- Ivo Milazzo, comic book artist
- Stefania Miscetti, architect and gallerist
- Giuliano Montaldo, film director
- Beppe Morra, gallerist
- Gabriele Muccino, film director
- Giovanni Neri, artist
- Nicky Nicolai, singer
- Andrea Occhipinti, actor and producer
- Nicola Oddati, writer
- Ferzan Özpetek, film director and screenwriter
- Andrea Palombi, editor
- Annamaria Panebianco
- Rocco Papaleo, actor, film director and singer
- Tommaso Paradiso, singer
- Lorenzo Pavolini, writer
- Angelo Petrella, writer, journalist and screenwriter
- Roberto Pietrosanti, artist
- Alfredo Pirri, painter
- Nicola Pistoia, actor and director
- Veronica Pivetti, actress and voice actress
- Domenico Procacci, film producer
- Lidia Ravera, writer and journalist
- Mariano Rigillo, actor
- Blas Roca Rey, actor
- Emanuele Salce, actor
- Antonio Salines, actor and director
- Giuseppe Salvatori, painter
- Stefania Sandrelli, actress
- Maria Savarese
- Edoardo Siravo, actor and theatre director
- Giovanni Soldati, film director and screenwriter
- Pino Strabioli, actor and theatre director
- Andrea Tarquini, singer
- Tosca, singer
- Adrian Tranquilli, contemporary artist
- Paolo Triestino, actor
- Giovanni Veronesi, film screenwriter, actor and director
- Pamela Villoresi, actress
- Massimo Wertmuller, actor

Organizations and platforms

- AreaDem, a christian left faction led by Dario Franceschini
- DEMS, a social-democratic faction led by Andrea Orlando
- NetworkDem, a social-democratic faction led by Sergio Lo Giudice
- ReGeneration Italy, a movement of progressists young people
- Young Democrats of the Province of Imperia
- Young Democrats of the Province of La Spezia

==== Maurizio Martina ====
Maurizio Martina

Former Prime Ministers
Former Ministers

- Graziano Delrio — Democratic Party group leader in the Chamber of Deputies (2018–present); Member of the Chamber of Deputies (2018–present); former Minister of Infrastructures and Transports (2015–2018); former Secretary of the Council of Ministers (2014–2015); former Minister of Regional Affairs and Autonomies (2013–2014); Mayor of Reggio Emilia (2004–2013)
- Valeria Fedeli — former Minister of Education, Universities and Research (2016–2018); Member of the Senate of the Republic (2013–present)
- Luca Lotti — former Minister for Sport (2016–2018); Member of the Chamber of Deputies (2013–present)

Deputies

Carla Cantone,Stefano Ceccanti, Andrea De Maria, Emanuele Fiano, Lorenzo Guerini, Matteo Orfini, Luca Rizzo Nervo, Ettore Rosato, Debora Serracchiani, Diego Zardini

Senators

Vincenzo D'Arienzo, Andrea Marcucci, Tommaso Nannicini, Matteo Richetti

Members of the European Parliament
Presidents of Regions

- Vincenzo De Luca — President of Campania (2015–present); Mayor of Salerno (2006–2015, 1993–2001, 1993); Member of the Chamber of Deputies (2001–2008)

Mayors (only cities with no less than 15,000 residents)
Other politicians

Maria Saladino

Non-political personalities

Mauro Berruto

Organizations and platforms

- Young Democrats of the Province of Salerno

==== Roberto Giachetti ====
Roberto Giachetti

Former Prime Ministers
Former Ministers

- Maria Elena Boschi — former Minister for Constitutional Reforms and Parliamentary Relations (2014–2016); former Secretary of the Council (2016–2018); Member of the Chamber of Deputies (2013–present)

Deputies

Michele Anzaldi, Anna Ascani, Luigi Marattin

Senators
Members of the European Parliament
Presidents of Regions
Mayors (only provincial capitals)
Mayors (only cities with no less than 15,000 residents)
Other politicians

Enrico Morando, Sandro Gozi

Non-political personalities
Organizations and platforms

==== Former candidates ====
Marco Minniti

Former Prime Ministers
Former Ministers

- Carlo Calenda — former Minister of Economic Development (2016–2018); former Permanent Representative of Italy to the European Union (2016)
- Paolo De Castro — Member of the European Parliament (2009–present); Member of the Senate of the Republic (2008–2009); former Minister of Agriculture (2006–2008, 1998–2000); Member of the Chamber of Deputies (2006–2008)
- Valeria Fedeli — former Minister of Education, Universities and Research (2016–2018); Member of the Senate of the Republic (2013–today)
- Giuseppe Fioroni — former Minister of Public Instruction (2006–2008); Member of the Chamber of Deputies (1996–2018); Mayor of Viterbo (1989–1995)

Deputies

- Ettore Rosato — Vicepresident of the Chamber of Deputies (2018–present); Member of the Chamber of Deputies (2008–present, 2003-2006)

Anna Ascani,Stefano Ceccanti, Piero De Luca, Emanuele Fiano, Lorenzo Guerini, Gennaro Migliore, Alessia Morani, Alberto Pagani

Senators

- Andrea Marcucci — Democratic Party group leader in the Senate of the Republic (2018–present); Member of the Senate of the Republic (2008–present); Member of the Chamber of Deputies (1992–1994)

Alessandro Alfieri, Gianni Pittella

Former

Stefano Esposito, Claudio Moscardelli

Members of the European Parliament
Presidents of Regions

- Vincenzo De Luca — President of Campania (2015–present); Mayor of Salerno (2006–2015, 1993–2001, 1993); Member of the Chamber of Deputies (2001–2008)
- Catiuscia Marini — President of Umbria (2010–today); Member of the European Parliament (2008–2009); Mayor of Todi (1997–2007)

Mayors (only provincial capitals)

- Marco Alessandrini — Mayor of Pescara (2014–present)
- Matteo Biffoni — Mayor of Prato (2014–present)
- Virginio Brivio — Mayor of Lecco (2010–present)
- Romano Carancini — Mayor of Macerata (2010–present)
- Fulvio Centoz — Mayor of Aosta (2015–present); Mayor of Rhêmes-Notre-Dame (2010–2015)
- Antonio Decaro — President of ANCI (2016–present); Mayor of Bari (2014–present); Member of the Chamber of Deputies (2013–2014)
- Giuseppe Falcomatà — Mayor of Reggio Calabria (2014–present)
- Maura Forte — Mayor of Vercelli (2014–present)
- Giorgio Gori — Mayor of Bergamo (2014–present)
- Valeria Mancinelli — Mayor of Ancona (2013–present)
- Silvia Marchionini — Mayor of Verbania (2014–present)
- Vincenzo Napoli — Mayor of Salerno (2016–present)
- Dario Nardella — Mayor of Florence (2014–present)
- Mattia Palazzi — Mayor of Mantua (2015–present)
- Matteo Ricci — Mayor of Pesaro (2014–present); Vice President of the Democratic Party (2013–2017); President of the Province of Pesaro and Urbino (2009–2014)

Mayors (only cities with no less than 15,000 residents)

Giancarlo Acerbi, Pietro Amitrano, Vincenzo Ascione, Angela Bagni, Sergio Batino, Giuseppe Bencivenga, Rodolfo Bertoli, Cristian Betti, Ciro Bonajuto, Saverio Bosco, Mario Bruno, Giuseppe Canfora, Giorgio Cangiano, Pino Capalbo, Santo Caruso, Claudio Castello, Andrea Cereser, Giuseppe Cirillo, Rosalba Piera Colombo, Isabella Conti, Adamo Coppola, Alberto Crisianini, Francesco Del Deo, Marco Antonio Del Prete, Antonino Di Fuardo, Sergio Di Raimo, Enzo Ferrandino, Francesco Fiordomo, Filippo Frittelli, Pasquale Fuccio, Vittorio Gabbanini, Enrico Ioculano, Samuele Lippi, Maurilio Longhin, Vincenzo Magra, Giacomo Mangoni, Dario Mantovani, Marco Mazzanti, Francesco Menna, Paolo Micheli, Francesco Miglio, Rocchino Muliere, Sebastian Nicoli, Fabrizio Pagani, Maria Rosa Pavanello, Massimiliano Pescini, Alberto Polo, Massimiliano Presciutti, Stefania Proietti, Simone Pugnaloni, Rosaria Punzo, Santi Rando, Aurelio Russo, Dimitri Russo, Antonio Sabino, Angelo Sbrocca, Clara Scapin, Alessio Spinelli, Palmiro Ucchielli, Francesca Valenti, Gianfranco Valiante, Franco Zaccaria, Ermanno Zacchetti, Giorgio Zinno.

Other politicians

Fabiano Amati, Nicola Irto, Marco Leonardi, Giacomo Mancini, Pietro Mannoni, Mino Mortaruolo, Marcella Zappaterra

Non-political personalities

Giuseppe Vacca, philosopher and historian

Organizations and platforms

=== Withdrawn ===
- Candidacies announced but later aborted
  - Matteo Richetti — Member of the Senate of the Republic (2018–present); former Member of the Chamber of Deputies (2013–2018). Announced his intention to run for the party leadership on 4 October but withdrew his candidacy on 27 November, endorsing the incumbent Secretary Maurizio Martina.
  - Marco Minniti — former Minister of the Interior (2016–2018); member of the Chamber of Deputies (2018–present; 2001–2013) and former member of the Senate of the Republic (2013–2018). Announced his intention to run for the party leadership on 18 November but withdrew his candidacy on 5 December.
  - Cesare Damiano — former Minister of Labour and Social Security (2006–2008); former member of the Chamber of Deputies (2006–2018). Announced his intention to run for the party leadership on 6 October but withdrew his candidacy on 11 December, endorsing Nicola Zingaretti.
- Envisaged candidacies
  - Riccardo Magi — Member of the Chamber of Deputies (2018–present); Secretary of Italian Radicals (2015–2018). Announced his intention to run on 16 March but did not take further action.

=== Declined ===
- Carlo Calenda — former Minister of Economic Development (2016–2018); former Permanent Representative of Italy to the European Union (2016). On 11 May declared he was not thinking about running at the primaries.
- Graziano Delrio — Member of the Chamber of Deputies (2018–present); former Minister of Infrastructures and Transports (2015–2018); former Secretary of the Council of Ministers (2015–2016); former Minister of Regional Affairs (2013–2014); former Mayor of Reggio Emilia (2004–2013). During an interview on Avvenire on 2 October he said he will not run for the leadership.
- Matteo Renzi — Member of the Senate of the Republic (2018–present); former Secretary of the Democratic Party (2013–2017, 2017–2018); former Prime Minister of Italy (2014–2016); Mayor of Florence (2009–2014); President of the Province of Florence (2004–2009). During an interview on 3 September announced he would not run again.

== Opinion polls ==
=== Advanced candidates ===
Date	Polling firm	Sample size				Lead
Date	Polling firm	Sample size	Zingaretti	Martina	Giachetti	Lead
22–27 Feb 2019	Bidimedia	1,084	60.0	23.0	17.0	37.0
26 Feb 2019	EMG	1,603	58.0	32.0	10.0	26.0
26 Feb 2019	Noto	–	55.0	27.0	18.0	28.0
25–26 Feb 2019	Demopolis	2,000	48.0–60.0	27.0–39.0	8.0–18.0	9.0–33.0
19 Feb 2019	EMG	1,802	58.0	34.0	8.0	24.0
14–17 Feb 2019	Winpoll	1,500	61.0	21.0	18.0	40.0
14 Feb 2019	EMG	–	56.0	37.0	7.0	19.0
2–6 Feb 2019	Bidimedia	1,113	56.0	25.0	19.0	31.0
5 Feb 2019	EMG	1,803	55.0	37.0	8.0	18.0

=== Before vote by party members ===
Date	Polling firm	Sample size					Others	Lead
Date	Polling firm	Sample size	Zingaretti	Boccia	Martina	Giachetti	Others	Lead
3 Feb	Zingaretti, Martina and Giachetti advance to open primary election Boccia endorsed Zingaretti, Saladino endorsed Martina							
7–10 Jan 2019	Bidimedia	1,096	49.0	1.0	25.0	21.0	4.0	24.0
18–21 Dec 2018	Twig	1,001	48.1	—N/a	43.2	8.7	0.0	4.9
17–21 Dec 2018	BiDimedia	1,018	50.0	4.0	22.0	20.0	4.0	28.0
18 Dec 2018	EMG	1,611	50.0	3.0	29.0	9.0	10.0	21.0
13 Dec 2018	EMG	2,000	52.0	4.0	33.0	7.0	4.0	19.0
12–13 Dec 2018	Ipsos	1,000	39.0	—N/a	17.0	8.0	36.0	22.0

=== Hypothetical polls ===
Date	Polling firm	Sample size									Others	Lead
Date	Polling firm	Sample size	Zingaretti	Richetti	Damiano	Boccia	Minniti	Martina	Giachetti	Renzi	Others	Lead
11 Dec	Cesare Damiano withdraws from the race, endorsing Nicola Zingaretti; Roberto Giachetti announces his intention to run											
8–9 Dec	Noto	1,000	41.0	—N/a	—N/a	—N/a	—N/a	28.0	—N/a	31.0	0.0	10.0
6 Dec	EMG	2,000	42.0	—N/a	4.0	3.0	26.0	22.0	—N/a	—N/a	3.0	16.0
3–6 Dec	Twig	1,000	39.3	—N/a	—N/a	—N/a	33.7	27.0	—N/a	—N/a	0.0	5.6
5 Dec	Marco Minniti withdraws from the race											
2 Dec	Noto	–	39.0	—N/a	—N/a	—N/a	32.0	29.0	—N/a	—N/a	0.0	7.0
29 Nov	EMG	2,000	42.0	—N/a	4.0	3.0	28.0	19.0	—N/a	—N/a	4.0	14.0
27 Nov	Matteo Richetti withdraws from the race, endorsing Maurizio Martina											
26 Nov	Ipsos	600	54.2	—N/a	—N/a	—N/a	29.1	16.7	—N/a	—N/a	0.0	25.1
22–24 Nov	Winpoll	1,500	38.3	5.4	3.0	1.5	37.0	12.3	—N/a	—N/a	2.4	1.3
21–23 Nov	Izi	1,020	38.2	4.9	3.1	6.9	23.8	17.9	—N/a	—N/a	5.2	14.4
22 Nov	Maurizio Martina announces his intention to run											
21 Nov	EMG	2,000	38.0	8.0	5.0	4.0	28.0	15.0	—N/a	—N/a	2.0	10.0
19–22 Nov	BiDiMedia	1,081	40.0	8.0	2.0	2.0	38.0	9.0	—N/a	—N/a	1.0	2.0
18 Nov	Marco Minniti announces his intention to run											
13–14 Nov	Demopolis	2,000	36.0	—N/a	—N/a	—N/a	33.0	—N/a	—N/a	—N/a	31.0	3.0
30 Oct	Noto	–	26.0	5.0	4.0	2.0	24.0	16.0	—N/a	22.0	1.0	2.0
28 Oct	Noto	–	41.0	8.0	—N/a	6.0	43.0	—N/a	—N/a	—N/a	2.0	2.0
28 Oct	Noto	–	66.0	23.0	—N/a	9.0	—N/a	—N/a	—N/a	—N/a	2.0	43.0
25–28 Oct	Izi	1,100	40.4	6.9	2.6	4.0	23.2	18.1	—N/a	—N/a	4.8	17.2
25–27 Oct	Winpoll	1,500	35.8	9.0	—N/a	0.8	—N/a	8.3	—N/a	33.1	13.0	2.7
22–26 Oct	BiDiMedia	975	44.0	14.0	3.0	6.0	29.0	—N/a	—N/a	—N/a	4.0	15.0

== Results ==
=== Vote by party members ===
Candidate	Votes	%
Nicola Zingaretti	88,918	47.38
Maurizio Martina	67,749	36.10
Roberto Giachetti	20,887	11.13
Francesco Boccia	7,537	4.02
Maria Saladino	1,315	0.70
Dario Corallo	1,266	0.67
Total valid votes	187,672	100.0
Invalid/blank votes	1,429	–
Total votes	189,101	100.0
Registered voters	374,786	–
Source: Partito Democratico – Results

Member vote
Zingaretti	47.38%
Martina	36.10%
Giachetti	11.13%
Boccia	4.02%
Saladino	0.70%
Corallo	0.67%

=== Primary election ===
Candidate	Votes	%	Delegates
Nicola Zingaretti	1,035,955	66.00	653
Maurizio Martina	345,318	22.00	228
Roberto Giachetti	188,355	12.00	119
Total valid votes	1,569,628	100.0	1,000
Invalid/blank votes	12,455	–	
Total votes	1,582,083	100.0	–
Source: Partito Democratico – Results

Popular vote
Zingaretti	66.00%
Martina	22.00%
Giachetti	12.00%

=== Delegates summary ===
Portrait	Name	Delegates
	Nicola Zingaretti	653/1000 (65%)
	Maurizio Martina	228/1000 (23%)
	Roberto Giachetti	119/1000 (12%)

== Aftermath ==
According to Open, an italian news website, the results of the popular vote were suspected of being "almost impossible on a statistical level", given that all three resulting percentages for each candidate are perfectly rounded numbers. The editorial staff of Il Post tried to contact the Democratic Party National Committee for further explanations but no answer was ever given.
