= Vincenzo De Luca =

Italian politician (born 1949)

- De Luca in 2025

Mayor of Salerno
- Incumbent
- Assumed office 1 June 2026
- Preceded by: Vincenzo Napoli
- In office 15 June 2006 – 3 February 2015
- Preceded by: Mario De Biase
- Succeeded by: Vincenzo Napoli
- In office 6 December 1993 – 15 May 2001
- Preceded by: Mario Laurino
- Succeeded by: Mario De Biase
- In office 22 May 1993 – 2 July 1993
- Preceded by: Vincenzo Giordano
- Succeeded by: Antonio Lattarulo

President of Campania
- In office 18 June 2015 – 9 December 2025
- Preceded by: Stefano Caldoro
- Succeeded by: Roberto Fico

Member of the Chamber of Deputies
- In office 30 May 2001 – 28 April 2008
- Constituency: Campania 2

Personal details
- Born: 8 May 1949 (age 77) Ruvo del Monte, Italy
- Party: PD (since 2007)
- Other political affiliations: PCI (before 1991); PDS (1991–1998); DS (1998–2007)
- Height: 1.69 m (5 ft 7 in)
- Spouse: Rosa Zampetti (m. 1979; div. 2008)
- Domestic partner: Maria Maddalena Cantisani
- Children: 2, including Piero
- Education: University of Salerno
- Profession: Politician; teacher
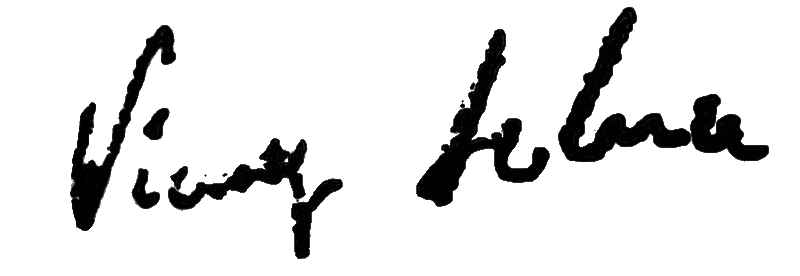
- Signature

Vincenzo De Luca (born 8 May 1949) is an Italian politician, former president of Campania and current mayor of Salerno. A member of the Democratic Party (PD), he also served as mayor of Salerno for more than 17 years, becoming one of the longest serving mayors in Italy. Often described as a populist politician, De Luca attracted national attention for his histrionic manner and incendiary tones, earning him a number of nicknames, particularly during the COVID-19 pandemic in Italy.

De Luca began his political career during the 1970s in the Italian Communist Party (PCI) and later joined the PCI's successor parties. He was a member of Salerno's city council in the 1990s and served three terms as mayor, being appointed in 1993 and then directly elected later that year, serving in the position until 2015 (with a break between 2001-2006 when he was term-limited) to run for president of Campania. He was also a member of the Chamber of Deputies from 2001 to 2008 and Undersecretary of State at the Ministry of Infrastructure and Transportation from 2013 to 2014. After being elected in 2015, he was re-elected as president of Campania in a landslide victory in 2020. In 2026, he was again elected Mayor of Salerno.

== Early life and education ==
De Luca was born on 8 May 1949 in the Basilicata village of Ruvo del Monte in the province of Potenza. He and his family then moved to Salerno in the Campania region at an early age. After obtaining a high school diploma at Salerno's liceo classico named after Torquato Tasso, he graduated in philosophy at the University of Salerno. Before entering politics, he worked as a philosophy teacher in high schools.

== Political career ==
=== Salerno City Council ===
During the 1970s, De Luca became a member of the PCI, at the time led by Enrico Berlinguer. In 1975, after having been head of the party's provincial organization, he was appointed as provincial secretary, leading the federation for a decade. In those years, he was jokingly nicknamed O Professore (Neapolitan for "The Professor") because of his job as a philosophy teacher. Due to his impetuous and strong style, De Luca was also nicknamed "Pol Pot", just like the Khmer Rouge dictator.

De Luca was elected to the Salerno City Council in 1990, holding the posts of both Commissioner of Public works and Deputy Mayor. In the spring of 1993, he was promoted to the office of mayor of Salerno due to the resignation of Vincenzo Giordano, who found himself involved in the Tangentopoli investigation. A month later, the resignation of the majority of councilors resulted in the dissolution of the municipal council. The subsequent elections marked a significant success of De Luca's Progressive List for Salerno, with 57.8% of votes in a second ballot against Giuseppe Acocella of the centre-right coalition. On 16 November 1997, De Luca was re-elected mayor in the first round with 71.3% of the vote.

=== Member of the Chamber of Deputies ===
Not being able to run for a third consecutive term as mayor, De Luca resigned in order to run for a parliamentary seat in the 2001 Italian general election. On 31 May 2001, he was elected to the Chamber of Deputies with of 55.4% of the vote, the highest percentage obtained by a candidate of The Olive Tree coalition in Southern Italy. After the 2006 Italian general election, De Luca was re-elected at the Chamber of Deputies and was appointed as a member of the Agriculture Commission.

=== Mayor of Salerno ===
During the 2006 Italian local elections, De Luca was re-elected as mayor of Salerno for a third term after a run-off election, gaining 56.9% of the vote. He ran as the candidate of the centre-left list Progressives for Salerno, in opposition to Alfonso Andria, the member of the European Parliament supported by The Daisy, and some members of the Democrats of the Left, which were against De Luca's candidacy due to his strong dissent towards the party regional president Antonio Bassolino. In the 2008 Italian general election, he was unable to run due to the incompatibility provided by law between the offices of member of Parliament and mayor of a city with more than 15,000 inhabitants. While in office, De Luca was one of the longest tenured and most popular mayors in Italy, having been ranked first in the 2008 Governance Poll by Il Sole 24 Ore.

Among De Luca's accomplishments as mayor of Salerno were leading provincial capitals for waste sorting (74.16% in October 2009), safety and quality of life, municipal nursery school system and social policies, and events and culture such as Luci d'Artista. He also promoted urban transformation featuring major names in the sector, such as Santiago Calatrava (Marina d'Arechi Village), Zaha Hadid (Stazione Marittima), Ricardo Bofill (Crescent and Piazza della Libertà), Oriol Bohigas (Municipal Urban Plan), and David Chipperfield (Cittadella Giudiziaria) that in 2015 won Salerno the Tripadvisor's "Travelers' Choice Awards Destinations on the Rise 2015" among the ten European destinations with the fastest growth in tourism.

On 30 January 2010, De Luca announced his candidacy to become president of Campania in the 2010 Campania regional election. His centre-right coalition rival Stefano Caldoro, a former minister and leader of the New PSI (a party that merged into Silvio Berlusconi's The People of Freedom in 2009) won by a convincing margin, thanks to a 20% swing in favor of the centre-right coalition, which included the Union of the Centre led by Ciriaco De Mita, an influential former leader of Christian Democracy. In 2011, De Luca was re-elected for a fourth term as mayor of Salerno with 74.42% of votes. From 2013 to 2014, while mayor of Salerno, he was also Undersecretary of State at the Ministry of Infrastructure and Transportation under Prime Minister Enrico Letta, raising again the problem of incompatibility.

In January 2026, De Luca's successor as Mayor of Salerno, Vincenzo Napoli announced he would retire early, which was seen as a move to facilitate De Luca's return to mayorship after his term as the president of the Campania region ended. De Luca indeed announced that he would run again for a fifth term in the elections in May. He was again re-elected in the first round.

=== President of Campania ===
In late 2014, De Luca announced his candidacy as president of Campania. In March 2015, he won the primary elections with 52% of the vote, becoming the PD-led centre-left coalition candidate for the 2015 Campania regional election. On 31 May 2015, De Luca was elected president of Campania, with 41% of the vote, defeating incumbent president Stefano Caldoro with a margin of 66,000 votes. During the COVID-19 pandemic, which caused the postponement of the election from May to September, he was re-elected in the 2020 Campania regional election, which he won with 68% of the vote. In November 2021, De Luca was investigated for corruption regarding a scandal involving the maintenance of city streets, public greenery, and parks of Salerno. The public prosecutor denounced the presence of an alleged cartel composed of eight cooperatives, which allegedly rigged the public procurements' tenders. The news was first reported by Massimo Giletti, who published a video on Twitter that was picked up by the Corriere della Sera.

In 2025, De Luca was term-limited and could not run for a third term as regional president. He struck an agreement with PD's national secretary Elly Schlein, agreeing to support Roberto Fico of the Five Star Movement as the centre-left coalition's candidate, in exchange for having his son Piero elected the regional secretary of PD in Campania. In the election, the candidates affiliated with De Luca ran as part of A Testa Alta ("Head Held High") list in the centre-left coalition, including his vice president Fulvio Bonavitacola; the list received 8.34% of the votes and returned 4 councillors.

== Character and persona ==
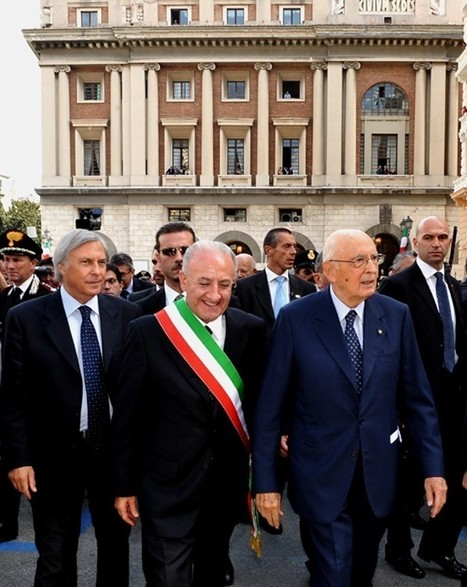
De Luca with the then Italian president Giorgio Napolitano in 2010

During his career, De Luca was known for his populist persona and his many public outbursts, earning him both supporters and criticism, including from Massimo Cacciari, a philosopher and former mayor of Venice affiliated with the centre-left coalition who in his general criticism of populism praised Veneto president Luca Zaia of the centre-right coalition and dismissed De Luca as a left-wing populist. Nicknamed lo Sceriffo ("The Sheriff") due to his outspokenly impetuous and strong government style, he was also called Don Vicienzo due to his restrictive policies during the COVID-19 pandemic in Italy.

Well known for making hyperbolic statements, his behavior was brought to national attention during the COVID-19 pandemic, and his fellow but unrelated politician Cateno De Luca was often used as a comparison due to sharing an histrionic character and populist rhetoric. On 20 March 2020, he threatened to send Carabinieri "with flamethrowers" after those organizing graduation parties. On 16 October, in explaining the decision to impose a curfew, he urged Campanians not to celebrate Halloween, calling it a "huge stupid Americanism". His statements, made in jest but with a serious tone and purpose, were variously described as "comic" and "uncouth". Notably, Italian software house DigiLabSoftware satirized De Luca's statements with some HTML browser games freely playable on their website, including a parody of Super Mario.

In April 2025, De Luca targeted Elon Musk in a public outburst. During a press interaction, De Luca referred to Musk as a "crazy drug addict" and stated that he "should be locked up in a psychiatric hospital", suggesting a 5150 psychiatric hold, known in Italy as TSO (Italian: trattamento sanitario obbligatorio). De Luca also criticized Italian Prime Minister Giorgia Meloni for associating with Musk, implying a contradiction with her party's claimed values of "God, Fatherland and Family". He added further insults, accusing Musk of being "a cokehead, a junkie, a nutcase", and referencing Musk's numerous children as part of his critique. Musk responded on X (formerly Twitter) by sharing a screenshot of a Grok AI-generated roast in Italian, captioned "Buono sera, buono sera [sic]". He later referred to De Luca as a "poor deluded fool" and mocked the authenticity of mainstream news.

== Personal life ==
In 1979, De Luca married Rosa Zampetti, a sociologist, from whom he had two sons, Piero and Roberto, both of which got involved in politics. Roberto served as a regional responsible for economy in the PD of Campania, while Piero was elected in 2018 a member of the Chamber of Deputies.

Political offices
Preceded by Vincenzo Giordano	Mayor of Salerno; 1993–2001	Succeeded by Mario De Biase
Preceded by Mario De Biase	Mayor of Salerno; 2006–2015	Succeeded by Vincenzo Napoli
Preceded by Stefano Caldoro	President of Campania; 2015–2025	Succeeded by Roberto Fico
Preceded by Vincenzo Napoli	Mayor of Salerno since 2026	Incumbent
