= List of presidents of the Province of Salerno =

President of the Province of Salerno
- Presidente della Provincia di Salerno
- Incumbent; Giuseppe Parente since 5 May 2026
- Term length: 4 years
- Inaugural holder: Gaetano Nunziante
- Formation: 1889

The president of the Province of Salerno is the head of the provincial government in Salerno, Campania, Italy. The president oversees the administration of the province, coordinates the activities of the municipalities, and represents the province in regional and national matters.

Since May 2026, the office has been held by Giuseppe Parente of the Democratic Party.

== List ==
=== Presidents of the Provincial Deputation (1889–1925) ===
No.	Portrait	Name	Term start	Term end	Party
1		Gaetano Nunziante	December 1889	August 1903	
2		Michele de Vargas Machuca	August 1903	1907	
3		Clemente Mauro	1907	August 1914	
4		Vito Lembo	August 1914	August 1919	
5		Adolfo Cilento	September 1919	January 1923	
6		Amedeo Moscati	January 1923	June 1925	

=== Presidents of the Royal Commission (1925–1929) ===
No.	Portrait	Name	Term start	Term end	Party
1		Ugo Capialbi	June 1925	October 1926	National Fascist Party
2		Fabio Valente	October 1926	April 1929	National Fascist Party

=== Presidents of the Provincial Rectorate (1929–1943) ===
No.	Portrait	Name	Term start	Term end	Party
1		Antonio Conforti	1929	1930	National Fascist Party
–		Luigi Licata	February 1930	January 1931	Special commissioner
2		Michele Jannicelli	January 1931	May 1932	National Fascist Party
–		Francesco Falcetti	May 1932	November 1932	Special commissioner
3		Mattia Farina	November 1932	October 1934	National Fascist Party
		Gaetano Tesauro	?	?	National Fascist Party

=== Presidents of the Province (1951–present) ===
No.	Portrait	Name	Term start	Term end	Party
		?	?	?	?
		Antonio Mario Innamorato	1985	1987	Italian Communist Party
		Andrea Carmine De Simone	1988	1992	Italian Communist Party; Democratic Party of the Left
		Ugo Carpinelli	1992	1993	Democratic Party of the Left
		Ettore Liguori	1993	1995	Christian Democracy
		Alfonso Andria	8 May 1995	14 June 1999	Italian People's Party; The Daisy
		Alfonso Andria	14 June 1999	14 June 2004	Italian People's Party; The Daisy
		Angelo Villani	14 June 2004	8 June 2009	The Daisy; Democratic Party
		Edmondo Cirielli	8 June 2009	24 October 2012	The People of Freedom
		Antonio Iannone (acting)	24 October 2012	13 October 2014	The People of Freedom
		Giuseppe Canfora	13 October 2014	31 October 2018	Democratic Party
		Michele Strianese	31 October 2018	21 November 2022	Democratic Party
		Francesco Alfieri	21 November 2022	3 October 2024	Democratic Party
		Giovanni Guzzo (acting)	3 October 2024	6 April 2025	Democratic Party
		Vincenzo Napoli	6 April 2025	6 February 2026	Democratic Party
		Giovanni Guzzo (acting)	6 February 2026	5 May 2026	Democratic Party
		Giuseppe Parente	5 May 2026	Incumbent	Democratic Party

== Sources ==
- "Storia amministrativa dell'ente". Ministero dell'Interno.
- Menichini, Piera (2005). "I presidenti delle Province dall'Unità alla Grande guerra: repertorio analitico". Storia Amministrazione Costituzione (13): 286–287.
