= Michele Scozia =

Italian politician (1928–1995)

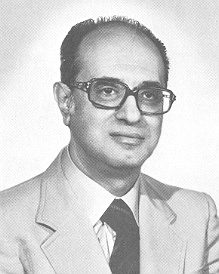
Michele Scozia

Michele Scozia (25 November 1928 – 18 November 1995) was an Italian politician who served as Deputy (1979–1983) and Mayor of Salerno (1985–1987).

== Biography ==
A member of the Christian Democracy, Scozia was elected to the Chamber of Deputies in the 1979 Italian general election, representing the Salerno–Avellino–Benevento constituency. During the VIII legislature, he served on the 8th Commission for Education and Fine Arts and as its secretary. His parliamentary term ended in 1983.

Following the 1985 Italian local elections, Scozia became mayor of Salerno on 12 September 1985, serving until 8 March 1987. He remained a Christian Democracy municipal councillor in Salerno until 1993.

Scozia died in November 1995, one week before his 67th birthday.
