= Giuseppe Parente =

Italian politician

President of the Province of Salerno
- Incumbent
- Assumed office 5 May 2026
- Preceded by: Vincenzo Napoli

Mayor of Bellosguardo
- Incumbent
- Assumed office 8 June 2009
- In office 15 June 1985 – 15 September 1992

Personal details
- Born: 8 April 1953 (age 73) Bellosguardo, Italy
- Party: Italian Communist Party; Democratic Party
- Education: University of Salerno

Giuseppe Parente (born 8 April 1953) is an Italian politician serving as president of the Province of Salerno since May 2026.

== Life and career ==
Parente graduated in philosophy from the University of Salerno. From 1980 to 2020, he worked as an official of the Italian Ministry of Culture at the Paestum Archaeological Park.

Parente was first elected to the office of mayor of Bellosguardo in June 1985 as a member of the Italian Communist Party (PCI). He was re-elected in 1990 and served until September 1992.

He returned as mayor following the 2009 local elections and was subsequently re-elected in 2014, 2019 and 2024.

On 5 May 2026, Parente was elected president of the Province of Salerno. Running as the centre-left candidate, he defeated centre-right opponent Pasquale Aliberti, mayor of Scafati, with 60.22% of the weighted vote, succeeding Vincenzo Napoli.
