= Gaspare Russo =

Italian politician (1927–2026)

President of Campania
- In office 12 August 1976 – 12 September 1979
- Preceded by: Nicola Mancino
- Succeeded by: Ciro Cirillo

Mayor of Salerno
- In office 19 October 1970 – 20 December 1974
- Preceded by: Alfonso Menna
- Succeeded by: Alberto Clarizia

Personal details
- Born: 27 April 1927 Minori, Campania, Italy
- Died: 23 March 2026 (aged 98) Salerno, Italy
- Party: Christian Democracy
- Occupation: Lawyer

Gaspare Russo (27 April 1927 – 23 March 2026) was an Italian politician who served as Mayor of Salerno (1970–1974) and president of Campania (1976–1979).

He died on 23 March 2026, at the age of 98.

Political offices
Preceded by Alfonso Menna	Mayor of Salerno; 1970–1974	Succeeded by Alberto Clarizia
Preceded by Nicola Mancino	President of Campania; 1976–1979	Succeeded by Ciro Cirillo
