= Anna Bilotti =

Italian politician

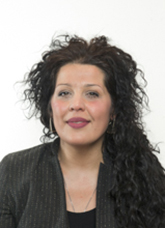

Senator of the Italian Republic
- Incumbent
- Assumed office October 13, 2022

Member of Parliament of the Italian Republic
- In office March 23, 2018 – October 12, 2022

Personal details
- Born: June 15, 1982 (age 43) Battipaglia, Italy
- Party: Five Star Movement
- Occupation: Politician

Anna Bilotti (born 15 June 1982) is an Italian politician. She is a member of the Chamber of Deputies from Campania 2 for the Five Star Movement.

== Biography ==
Born on June 15, 1982, in Battipaglia, but residing in Giffoni Valle Piana, she works as a criminal Lawyer.

In the 2018 general election, she ran for the Chamber of Deputies and was elected as a member of the Five Star Movement (M5S) in the Campania 2 (Chamber of Deputies constituency).

In the 18th legislature of the Republic, he is a member of the Election Committee, the 13th Agriculture Committee, the 11th Public and Private Employment Committee, and the Parliamentary Inquiry Committee on the death of Killing of Giulio Regeni.

In May 2019, she ranked second among the most present members of Italian Parliament, according to the Openpolis association, with 3,494 votes in the Chamber of Deputies out of a total of 3,497 (99.91%).

On December 11, 2021, he became a member of the Security Committee of the Five Star Movement.

In the early general elections of 2022, she was nominated as a candidate for the Senate of the Republic (Italy), in second place on the Five Star Movement's list in the Campania - 02 multi-member constituency, and was elected senator, taking over from the list leader Stefano Patuanelli, who opted for the Lazio 02 constituency.
