= Antonio Del Monaco =

Italian military officer and politician (1956–2023)

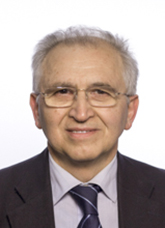
- Del Monaco in 2018

Member of the Chamber of Deputies of Italy for Campania 2
- In office 23 March 2018 – 12 October 2022

Personal details
- Born: 8 April 1956 Maddaloni, Italy
- Died: 11 November 2023 (aged 67) Rome, Italy
- Party: M5S
- Education: University of Salerno
- Occupation: Military officer

Antonio Del Monaco (8 April 1956 – 11 November 2023) was an Italian military officer and politician. A member of the Five Star Movement, he served in the Chamber of Deputies from 2018 to 2022.

Del Monaco died in Rome on 11 November 2023, at the age of 67.
