= List of mayors of Salerno =

Mayor of Salerno
- Sindaco di Salerno

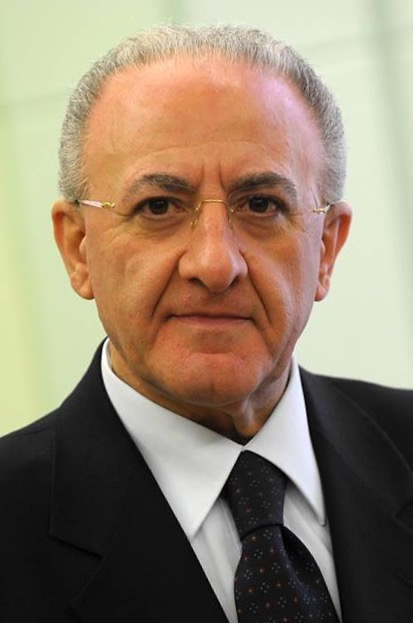
- Incumbent; Vincenzo De Luca since 1 June 2026
- Appointer: Popular election
- Term length: 5 years, renewable once
- Formation: January 1861
- Website: Official website

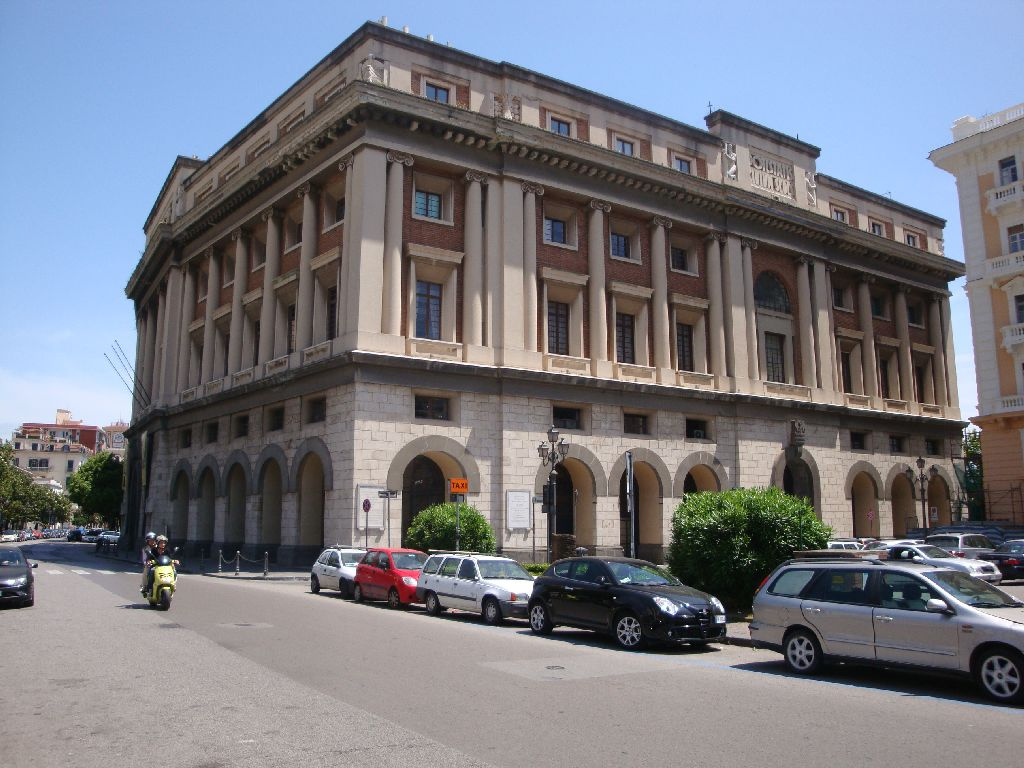
Salerno City Hall.

The mayor of Salerno is an elected politician who, along with the Salerno City Council, is accountable for the strategic government of Salerno in Campania, Italy.

== Overview ==
According to the Italian Constitution, the mayor of Salerno is member of the City Council.

The mayor is elected by the population of Salerno, who also elect the members of the city council, controlling the mayor's policy guidelines and is able to enforce his resignation by a motion of no confidence. The mayor is entitled to appoint and release the members of his government.

Since 1993 the mayor is elected directly by Salerno's electorate: in all mayoral elections in Italy in cities with a population higher than 15,000 the voters express a direct choice for the mayor or an indirect choice voting for the party of the candidate's coalition. If no candidate receives at least 50% of votes, the top two candidates go to a second round after two weeks. The election of the City Council is based on a direct choice for the candidate with a preference vote: the candidate with the majority of the preferences is elected. The number of the seats for each party is determined proportionally.

== Italian Republic (since 1946) ==
=== City Council election (1946–1993) ===
From 1946 to 1993, the Mayor of Salerno was elected by the City Council.

	Mayor	Term start	Term end	Party
1	Matteo Rossi	19 December 1946	22 March 1947	DC
2	Luigi Buonocore	22 March 1947	7 June 1952	DC
3	Mario Parrilli	7 June 1952	22 December 1952	DC
4	Francesco Alario	22 December 1952	2 May 1953	DC
5	Alfonso Menna	10 July 1955	19 October 1970	DC
6	Gaspare Russo	19 October 1970	20 December 1974	DC
7	Alberto Clarizia	20 December 1974	19 July 1976	DC
8	Walter Mobilio	19 July 1976	22 September 1976	DC
9	Pellegrino Cucciniello	22 September 1976	9 March 1977	DC
10	Vittorio Provenza	9 March 1977	24 March 1978	DC
11	Bruno Ravera	24 March 1978	4 August 1979	DC
12	Alberto Clarizia	4 August 1979	4 August 1980	DC
13	Ennio D'Aniello	4 August 1980	12 October 1981	PRI
14	Renato Borrelli	12 October 1981	10 June 1982	DC
15	Nicola Visone	10 June 1982	5 October 1982	DC
(12)	Alberto Clarizia	5 October 1982	23 January 1984	DC
16	Aniello Salzano	23 January 1984	12 February 1985	DC
(15)	Nicola Visone	12 February 1985	6 March 1985	DC
(10)	Vittorio Provenza	6 March 1985	12 September 1985	DC
17	Michele Scozia	12 September 1985	8 March 1987	DC
18	Vincenzo Giordano	8 March 1987	22 May 1993	PSI
19	Vincenzo De Luca	22 May 1993	2 July 1993	PDS
–	Special commissioners (Note: Nominated by the prefect after the mayor and the members of the City Council resigned in order to hold a new election under the provision of the new local electoral law.)	2 July 1993	6 December 1993	-

=== Direct election (since 1993) ===
Since 1993, under provisions of new local administration law, the Mayor of Salerno is chosen by direct election, originally every four, then every five years.

	Mayor	Term start	Term end	Party	Coalition	Election
(19)	Vincenzo De Luca (b. 1949)	6 December 1993	17 November 1997	PDS; DS	PDS	1993
(19)	Vincenzo De Luca (b. 1949)	17 November 1997	15 May 2001	PDS; DS	PDS	1997
20	Mario De Biase (b. 1952)	15 May 2001	15 June 2006	DS	The Olive Tree (DS-DL-PRC-SDI)	2001
(19)	Vincenzo De Luca (b. 1949)	15 June 2006	16 May 2011	DS; PD	DS	2006
(19)	Vincenzo De Luca (b. 1949)	16 May 2011	3 February 2015 (Note: Resigned in order to participate in the regional election. The deputy mayor Vincenzo Napoli held the office till a new mayoral election was held.)	DS; PD	PD • SEL • PSI	2011
21	Vincenzo Napoli (b. 1950)	3 February 2015	14 June 2016	PD	PD • SEL • PSI	2011
21	Vincenzo Napoli (b. 1950)	14 June 2016	8 October 2021	PD	PD • PSI • FdV	2016
21	Vincenzo Napoli (b. 1950)	8 October 2021 (Note: Election originally scheduled for June 2021 and then postponed due to the coronavirus pandemic.)	6 February 2026 (Note: Resigned.)	PD	PD • PSI	2021
Special Prefectural Commissioner tenure (6 February 2026 – 1 June 2026)
(19)	Vincenzo De Luca (b. 1949)	1 June 2026	Incumbent	PD	PD • PSI	2026

== See also ==
- Timeline of Salerno
