= Stefano Graziano =

Italian politician (born 1971)

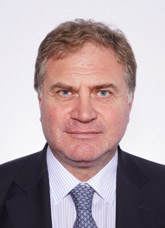
- Graziano in 2022

Member of the Chamber of Deputies
- Incumbent
- Assumed office 13 October 2022
- Constituency: Campania 2
- In office 29 April 2008 – 14 March 2013
- Constituency: Campania 2

Personal details
- Born: 13 September 1971 (age 55) Aversa, Italy
- Party: Democratic Party
- Education: Second University of Naples
- Profession: Engineer

Stefano Graziano (born 13 September 1971) is an Italian politician. He has been a member of the Chamber of Deputies since 2022, having previously served from 2008 to 2013. From 2015 to 2020, he was a member of the Regional Council of Campania.
