= Edmondo Cirielli =

Italian politician

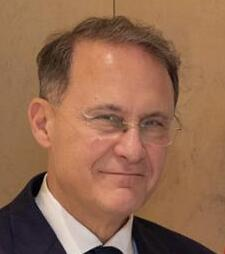

Deputy Minister of Foreign Affairs
- Incumbent
- Assumed office 2 November 2022
- Prime Minister: Giorgia Meloni
- Preceded by: Marina Sereni

Member of the Chamber of Deputies
- Incumbent
- Assumed office 30 May 2001
- Constituency: Campania 2 (2001–present)

President of the Province of Salerno
- In office 7 June 2009 – 24 October 2012
- Preceded by: Angelo Villani
- Succeeded by: Antonio Iannone

Personal details
- Born: 22 May 1963 (age 63) Nocera Inferiore, Italy
- Party: MSI (until 1995); AN (1995–2009); PdL (2009–2012); FdI (since 2012)
- Education: University of Parma; University of Salerno
- Profession: Carabinieri Officer
- Website: Official website

Military service
- Allegiance: Italy
- Branch/service: Carabinieri
- Years of service: 1983–2001
- Rank: Brigadier general

Edmondo Cirielli (Italian pronunciation: [edˈmondo tʃiˈrjɛlli]; born 22 May 1964) is an Italian politician. He is a deputy of the Italian Chamber of Deputies since 2001, and has previously served as President of the Province of Salerno from 2009 to 2012.

== Early life ==
Edmondo Cirielli was born in Nocera Inferiore on 22 May 1964. He attended the Nunziatella Military School and the Military Academy of Modena. He remained in the military until his discharge in 2020.

== Political career ==
Cirielli first ran for a seat in the Chamber of Deputies in 1994 with the National Alliance, but he was unsuccessful. He was elected regional council of Campania in 1995 and reelected in 2000. He was elected to the Chamber of Deputies in 2001 and reelected in 2006. In 2009, he was elected President of Salerno.

Cirielli co-founded the Brothers of Italy in 2012 and was reelected to the Chamber of Deputies as a member of this party in 2013 and 2018. He was appointed deputy foreign minister under the government of Giorgia Meloni in 2022.

On 7 October 2025, Cirielli was officially appointed as the candidate of the centre-right coalition for the 2025 Campania regional election.
