= Alfonso Andria =

Italian politician

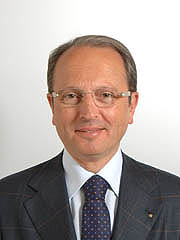
Alfonso Andria

Alfonso Andria (born 27 May 1952 in Salerno) is an Italian politician and Member of the European Parliament for Southern with the Margherita Party, part of the Alliance of Liberals and Democrats for Europe and sits on the European Parliament's Committee on Regional Development.

He is a substitute for the Committee on the Environment, Public Health and Food Safety, a member of the Delegation for relations with the United States and a substitute for the Delegation for relations with Switzerland, Iceland and Norway and to the European Economic Area (EEA) Joint Parliamentary Committee.

== Biography ==
The son of a school superintendent and a literature teacher, he earned a master’s degree in law. He began his career as a talented actor and singer in local amateur theater groups and later became a manager at the Salerno Provincial Tourism Board, where he worked from 1973 to 1995 in the events and tourism promotion sector in Italy and abroad, overseeing the organization of national and international events.

== Education ==
- 1978: Graduate in law

== Career ==
- 1973-1995: Director of the provincial tourism authority of Salerno
- Member of the 'Margherita' party executive
- 1985-1993: Member of Salerno Municipal Council
- 1995-2004: President of the Province of Salerno
- 1995-1999: Member of the Bureau of the UPI - Union of the Provincial Councils of Italy
- Former regional Vice-Chairman of the AICCRE
- 2001-2004: Chairman of the Federal Council of the League of Local Authorities
- 2002-2004: Member of the Committee of the Regions of the European Union
- until 2001: Chairman of the Board of Directors of the company managing the European Employment Pact for Agro Nocerino-Sarnese
- responsible for the contract for the Salerno 'Crater'
- former member of the CNEL consultative committee for the Mezzogiorno (Coordinator)
- General Secretary (1983–1988), adviser to the Chairman (1988–2001) and Chairman (since 2002) of the European University Centre for the Cultural Heritage of Ravello
- Chairman of the Board of Directors of the Consortium PRUSST 'Ospitalità da favola' and the Atheneum Consortium (Training in film, television and multi-media work)

== Decorations ==
- Commander of the Order of St Gregory the Great
- Knight of the Sacred Military Constantinian Order of Saint George

== See also ==
- 2004 European Parliament election in Italy

European Parliament
Preceded by Jointly held	Member of Parliament for Italy; 2004–2009	Succeeded by Jointly held
Party political offices
New title	Shadow Minister of Agriculture; 2008–2009	Title abolished
