= Agostino Santillo =

Italian politician (born 1974)

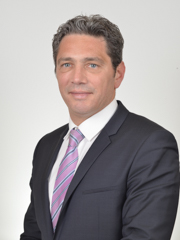
- Santillo in 2018

Member of the Chamber of Deputies
- Incumbent
- Assumed office 13 October 2022
- Constituency: Campania 2 – P01

Member of the Senate
- In office 23 March 2018 – 12 October 2022
- Constituency: Campania – P01

Personal details
- Born: 28 October 1974 (age 52) Caserta
- Party: Five Star Movement

Agostino Santillo (born 28 October 1974) is an Italian politician serving as a member of the Chamber of Deputies since 2022. From 2018 to 2022, he was a member of the Senate.

== Biography ==
Born in Caserta but residing in Casapulla (Caserta), he graduated in Civil Engineering from the University of Campania Luigi Vanvitelli and has been working as a freelance engineer since 2002, collaborating with various public bodies such as the Basin Authority, the Campania, various municipalities, and the Second University of Naples itself.

Activist for Beppe Grillo and Gianroberto Casaleggio Five Star Movement (M5S) since 2012, he stood as a candidate on their list in the 2015 regional elections in Campania, supporting presidential candidate Valeria Ciarambino. He obtained over 5,000 votes in the Caserta Electoral district but was not elected
