= Gerolamo Cangiano =

Italian politician (born 1981)

Member of the Chamber of Deputies
- Incumbent
- Assumed office 13 October 2022
- Constituency: Campania 2 – 01

Personal details
- Born: 19 March 1981 (age 45)
- Party: Brothers of Italy (since 2013)

Gerolamo Cangiano (born 19 March 1981) is an Italian politician serving as a member of the Chamber of Deputies since 2022. He has served as coordinator of Brothers of Italy in Campania since 2018.
