= Gianluca Cantalamessa =

Italian politician (born 1968)

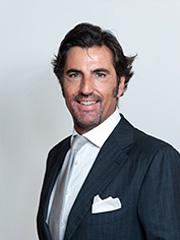
- Cantalamessa in 2022

Member of the Senate
- Incumbent
- Assumed office 13 October 2022
- Constituency: Campania – P02

Member of the Chamber of Deputies
- In office 23 March 2018 – 12 October 2022
- Constituency: Campania 2 – P03

Personal details
- Born: 2 February 1968 (age 58)
- Party: Lega

Gianluca Cantalamessa (born 2 February 1968) is an Italian politician serving as a member of the Senate since 2022. From 2018 to 2022, he was a member of the Chamber of Deputies.
