= Imma Vietri =

Italian politician (born 1969)

Member of the Chamber of Deputies
- Incumbent
- Assumed office 13 October 2022
- Constituency: Campania 2 – U05

Personal details
- Born: 21 October 1969 (age 56)
- Party: Brothers of Italy

Maria Immacolata Vietri (born 21 October 1969), better known as Imma Vietri, is an Italian politician serving as a member of the Chamber of Deputies since 2022. She has served as secretary of the Childhood and Adolescence Committee since 2023.
