= Antonio Iannone =

Italian politician (born 1975)

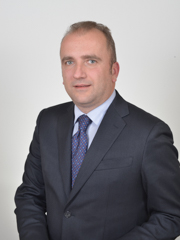
- Iannone in 2018

Member of the Senate
- Incumbent
- Assumed office 23 March 2018
- Constituency: Campania – 03

Personal details
- Born: 18 September 1975 (age 50)
- Party: Brothers of Italy (since 2013)

Antonio Iannone (born 18 September 1975) is an Italian politician serving as undersecretary of infrastructure and transport since 2025. He has been a member of the Senate since 2018. From 2012 to 2014, he served as acting president of the province of Salerno.

In the 2006 general election, he ran for the Chamber of Deputies on the AN party lists in the Campania 2 district, but was not elected.

== Biography ==
Born in Torre del Greco (Naples), but living in Nocera Inferiore (Salerno), and a member of National Alliance (Italy)(AN), he ran for the Salerno Provincial Council in the 2004 local elections on one of AN’s slates in the Salerno I district in support of center-right presidential candidate Antonio Cuomo, but was not elected.

In the 2006 general election, he ran for the Chamber of Deputies (Italy) on the AN party lists in the Campania 2 district, but was not elected.

In 2009, he joined the merger of AN into The People of Freedom(PdL) party, with which he held his first institutional positions in the Province of Salerno during Edmondo Cirielli presidency, being appointed first as councilor for youth policies from 2009 to 2012, then vice president in 2012, and finally serving as interim president of the province from 2012 to 2014, taking over from Cirielli himself, who had been removed from office due to a conflict of interest between the positions of provincial president and member of parliament.
