= Michele Gubitosa =

Italian politician (born 1979)

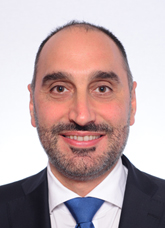
- Gubitosa in 2022

Member of the Chamber of Deputies
- Incumbent
- Assumed office 23 March 2018
- Constituency: Campania 2 – 06 (2018–2022); Campania 2 – 02 (2022–present)

Personal details
- Born: 21 December 1979 (age 46)
- Party: Five Star Movement

Michele Gubitosa (born 21 December 1979) is an Italian politician serving as a member of the Chamber of Deputies since 2018. He has served as vice president of the Five Star Movement since 2021.

== Biography ==
Born in Atripalda (Avellino), but originally from Montemiletto(Avellino), where he currently lives, he earned his high school diploma from the Oscar D’Agostino Technical Institute for Surveyors in Avellino and then launched his entrepreneurial career by founding an IT maintenance company in 1997 , and in the years that followed, he created a number of startups in the Information technology sector to support businesses.

In 2015, he entered the world of soccer by becoming vice president of Unione Sportiva Avellino 1912, and then assumed the position of president in October 2016, a role he held until the following year, when he resigned and sold his shares in the club.In 2015, he entered the world of soccer by becoming vice president of Unione Sportiva Avellino 1912, and then assumed the position of president in October 2016, a role he held until the following year, when he resigned and sold his shares in the club.
