= Ilenia Malavasi =

Italian politician (born 1971)

Member of the Chamber of Deputies
- Incumbent
- Assumed office 13 October 2022
- Constituency: Emilia-Romagna – U03

Personal details
- Born: 22 October 1971 (age 54)
- Party: Democratic Party (since 2007)

Ilenia Malavasi (born 22 October 1971) is an Italian politician serving as a member of the Chamber of Deputies since 2022. From 2014 to 2022, she served as mayor of Correggio.
