= Letizia Giorgianni =

Italian politician (born 1977)

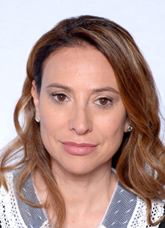
- Letizia Giorgianni in 2022

Member of the Chamber of Deputies
- Incumbent
- Assumed office 13 October 2022
- Constituency: Campania

Personal details
- Born: 9 March 1973 (age 53) Sarteano, Italy
- Party: Fratelli d'Italia
- Website: letiziagiorgianni.it

Carmen Letizia Giorgianni (Sarteano, 26 June 1977) is an Italian politician of Fratelli d'Italia.

== Early life ==
Giorgianni graduated in philosophy from the University of Perugia in 2004 with a thesis on Sartre's existentialism. She subsequently obtained a master's degree in Business Communication in 2005. She began her professional career in the press office of the Province of Siena, and then moved towards television journalism, specializing in particular in investigative journalism.

In 2015, in reaction to the legislative decree 183/2015, commonly labeled by opponents as the "Bank Rescue Decree", she joined the Facebook group focused on this issue. The group's main objective was to provide information to savers involved with the four banks mentioned in the decree. This interest was motivated by the personal involvement of her family, who had invested in Banca Etruria bonds. Participation in the Facebook group subsequently led to demonstrations in Rome and other related initiatives and marked the beginning of Giorgianni's commitment to savers. At a later time the Facebook page was transformed into an official association "Association of victims of the bank bailout" which sees Giorgianni as president and has assumed the legal representation of the citizens who they believe are damaged by the practices of the banks and by the repercussions of the decree.

In 2017 she decided to enter politics by joining Fratelli d'Italia. Since then she has carried out activities for the party as a member of the Research Office. She ran for office in the 2022 political elections, where she was elected as a parliamentary representative in the Campania constituency.

She has been a member of the Fratelli D'Italia parliamentary group since 18 October 2022, and since 9 November 2022 she has been part of the V commission (budget, treasury and planning).
