= Piero De Luca =

Italian politician (born 1980)

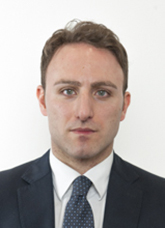
- De Luca in 2018

Member of the Chamber of Deputies
- Incumbent
- Assumed office 23 March 2018
- Constituency: Campania 2

Personal details
- Born: 11 June 1980 (age 46)
- Party: Democratic Party
- Parent: Vincenzo De Luca (father)

Piero De Luca (born 11 June 1980) is an Italian politician of the Democratic Party serving as a member of the Chamber of Deputies. He was first elected in the 2018 general election, and was re-elected in 2022. He is the son of Vincenzo De Luca.

== Biography ==
Born in Cava de' Tirreni (Salerno), the eldest son of Sociology Rosa Zampetti and politician Vincenzo De Luca, he, like his father, graduated from the Torquato Tasso High School in Salerno. In 2003, he graduated with honors with a degree in law from the University of Naples Federico II, defending a thesis in constitutional law on conflicts of jurisdiction between the state judiciary and the regions.

He pursued specialized studies in Brussels metropolitan area at the IEE (Institut d'études européennes, part of the Université libre de Bruxelles), where he earned a diploma in specialized studies in European law during the 2005–2006 academic year.

He holds a Ph.D. in Law and Economics from University of Naples Federico II, with a dissertation on “Soft Law in European Union Law.” He has been a licensed attorney since 2006.

From 2008 to 2018, he served as a temporary agent at the Court of Justice of the European Union, where he worked as a law clerk in the chambers of Judge Antonio Tizzano.

In 2022, he became an associate professor of Law of the European Union at the University of Cassino and Southern Lazio.
