= Enrica Alifano =

Italian politician

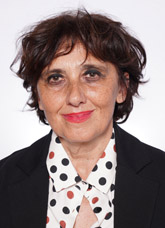

Member of the Chamber of Deputies of Italy
- Incumbent
- Assumed office 2022
- Constituency: Campania 2

Personal details
- Born: January 31, 1967 (age 59) Caserta
- Party: 5 Star Movement

Enrica Alifano is a member of the Chamber of Deputies of Italy. She was elected in 2022.

== Biography ==
Born in Caserta, she lives in Casagiove. In 1989, she graduated in Law from the University of Naples Federico II, then obtained a PhD in Economic History in 1993, focusing on the history of Southern Italy. She is the author of several publications. She has taken an interest in food supply in Naples, the trade in basic necessities, and feudalism. Since 2002, she has been working as a criminal lawyer, qualified to practice before the higher courts, at the bar of Santa Maria Capua Vetere.

She is married and has two children.
