= Walter Verini =

Italian politician (born 1956)

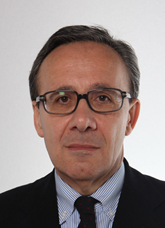

Member of the Senate
- Incumbent
- Assumed office 13 October 2022
- Constituency: Umbria

Member of the Chamber of Deputies
- In office 29 April 2008 – 13 October 2022
- Constituency: Umbria

Personal details
- Born: 17 January 1956 (age 70) Città di Castello, Italy
- Party: PCI (till 1991); PDS (1991-1998); DS (1998-2007); PD (since 2007)
- Profession: Journalist

Walter Verini (born 17 January 1956) is an Italian politician and member of the Democratic Party.

== Biography ==
A professional journalist since 1978, Verini worked on and directed various newspapers and local radio and TV stations in Umbria, He worked on Paese Sera and L'Unità and directed YouDem, newspaper of the Democratic Party.

=== Political career ===
Verini held various political-administrative positions in Umbria until 1996, when he began to collaborate with Walter Veltroni. He was head of Veltroni's secretariat when Veltroni was Minister of cultural heritage, Deputy Prime Minister, secretary of the Democrats of the Left, mayor of Rome, and secretary of the Democratic Party.

Verini was elected to the Chamber of Deputies for the first time in the 2008 elections in the Umbria constituency. In both the 2013 elections and 2018 elections he was re-elected deputy for the Democratic Party.

In 2019, the secretary of the Democratic Party Nicola Zingaretti appointed Verini commissioner of the Democratic Party in Umbria, an office he held until 2020. In 2019, Verini was appointed Treasurer of the Democratic Party by its national assembly.

In the 2022 snap elections, Verini was elected to the Senate with the Democratic Party - Democratic and Progressive Italy.
