= Marco Minniti =

Italian politician (born 1956)

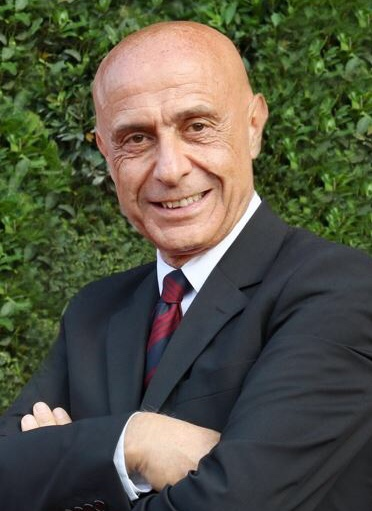

Minister of the Interior
- In office 12 December 2016 – 1 June 2018
- Prime Minister: Paolo Gentiloni
- Preceded by: Angelino Alfano
- Succeeded by: Matteo Salvini

Member of the Chamber of Deputies
- In office 23 March 2018 – 11 March 2021
- Constituency: Campania
- In office 30 May 2001 – 14 March 2013
- Constituency: Calabria

Member of the Senate of the Republic
- In office 15 March 2013 – 22 March 2018
- Constituency: Calabria

Personal details
- Born: Domenico Luca Marco Minniti; 6 June 1956 (age 70) Reggio Calabria, Italy
- Party: PCI (1980–1991); PDS (1991–1998); DS (1998–2007); PD (since 2007)
- Spouse: Mariangela Sera
- Children: 2
- Education: University of Messina (MA)

Marco Minniti (Italian pronunciation: [ˈmarko minˈniːti]; born 6 June 1956) is an Italian politician. A member of the Democratic Party, he served in the government of Italy as Minister of the Interior from 12 December 2016 to 1 June 2018. Previously, he was one of the most prominent councilors of former Prime Ministers Matteo Renzi and Massimo D'Alema.

Due to his policies on immigration and security, Minniti has been often criticized by left-wing intellectuals and writers, like Roberto Saviano, and labeled as a strongman. He has been sometimes nicknamed "The Lord of the Spies", due to his long-time experience in coordinating the secret services in almost all the centre-left coalition's governments. While he was in office, some political commentators described him as the most powerful man in Italy.

== Early life ==
Minniti was born in Reggio Calabria in Southern Italy in 1956. His father was a general of the Italian Army.

Minniti stated that when he was young he wanted become an aviator of the Italian Air Force, but his mother forbade it, so at 17 years old he joined the Italian Communist Party, as a protest against his parents.

During 1970s, he graduated in philosophy at the University of Messina. In these years he met his future wife, Mariangela Sera, with whom he has two daughters.

== Early political career ==
Minniti mature in Calabria most of his political education; during 1970s he became a member of the Italian Communist Party led by Enrico Berlinguer. In 1986 he served on the Commission for Labour's issues of the Communist Party. In 1986 he became secretary of the PCI provincial federation of Reggio Calabria.

In 1992, he became regional secretary of the Calabrian Democratic Party of the Left, a position he left in 1994 when he was appointed in the national leadership of the party. With the foundation of the Democrats of the Left, in February 1998, he was appointed secretary to the party's organization.

Minniti was candidated in the 1996 general election for The Olive Tree coalition of Romano Prodi, in Calabria, but he was not elected. However during this period he became a close collaborator of Massimo D'Alema, leader of the PDS.

From 1998 to 2001, he hold the offices of Undersecretary in the centre-left cabinets of D'Alema and Giuliano Amato.

In 2001 Italian general election, Minniti was elected for the first time to the Chamber of Deputies.

=== Deputy Minister and Secretary ===
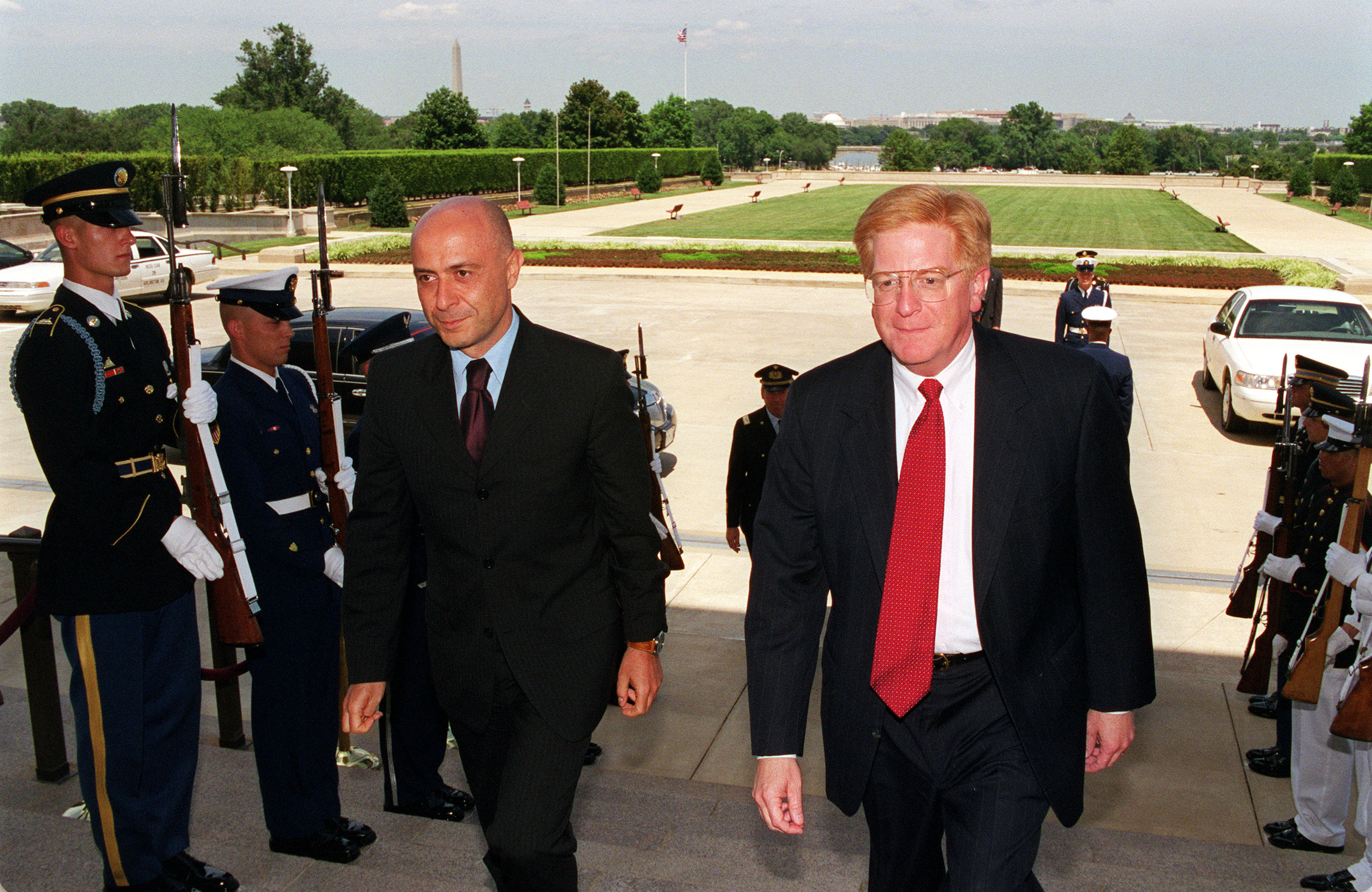
Minniti with U.S. Deputy Secretary of Defense Rudy de Leon in July 2000

In the 2006 Italian general election he was re-elected in Calabria in the Chamber of Deputies and after The Union victory, Minniti was appointed Deputy Minister of the Interior in the Prodi II Cabinet.

After the leadership election of 14 October 2007, he was elected regional secretary of the Democratic Party in Calabria, an office who held until 2009. In the general election of 2008 he was elected for a third term in his constituency.

From 2007 to 2013, Minniti was a member of the National Direction of the PD, under the leaderships of Walter Veltroni, Dario Franceschini and Pier Luigi Bersani.

In 2013 Italian general election, Minniti was elected in the Senate for the first time. On 17 May 2013, he was appointed Secretary to the Prime Minister's Office in Letta Cabinet with responsibility for intelligence services, presiding the Delegated Authority for the Security of the Republic. Minniti hold this office also in the government of Matteo Renzi, becoming one of the most prominent councilors of the Prime Minister.

== Minister of the Interior ==
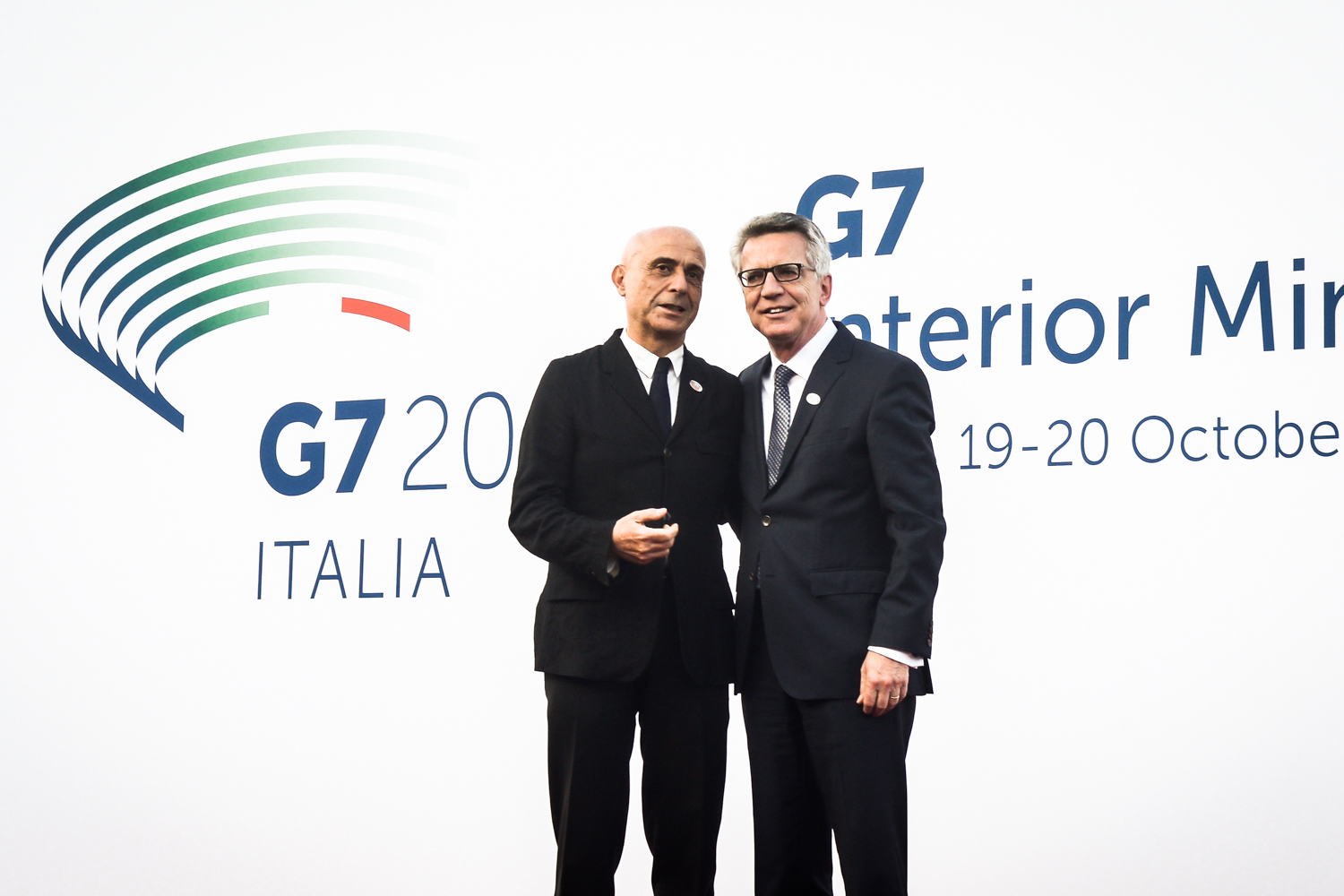
Minniti with his German counterpart Thomas de Maizière in October 2017

On 12 December 2016, Minniti was appointed new Minister of the Interior in the government of Paolo Gentiloni.

On 23 December 2016, Anis Amri, the perpetrator of the Berlin truck attack on 19 December, was killed in a shootout with police in front of the Sesto San Giovanni railway station, near Milan, Italy. The suspect had just arrived by train from Chambéry, France (via Turin). During a routine patrol, two police officers asked to search his backpack after he said he did not have any identity documents. Amri then pulled out a gun and shot one of the officers in the shoulder. The other officer responded by shooting Amri. Minniti stated that a policeman had been hospitalized with a shoulder injury.

One of the first actions as minister was the reopening and increase of the Identification and Expulsion Centres (CIE) and the doubling of the expulsions of irregular immigrants; this measures was supported by the Chief of Police Franco Gabrielli, but was harshly criticized by the left-wing opposition of Italian Left, and also by intellectuals and writers like Roberto Saviano.

On 9 January 2017, Minniti traveled to Libya to begin the negotiations with President Fayez al-Sarraj to sign a new agreement on repatriation of irregular immigrants. On this occasion it was reopened the Italian embassy in Tripoli that, previously, had been closed.

In May 2017, Minniti met the Interior Ministers of Niger, Chiad, and Libya, with whom he announced that Italy would build migration centers in North Africa to stop the migration through the Mediterranean Sea. However, Minniti was often accused by his critics of being responsible for severe human rights violations of refugees trapped in Libyan detention centers.

Minniti remained in office until 1 June 2018, when Matteo Salvini was appointed new Interior Minister in the government of Giuseppe Conte.

=== NGO Code ===
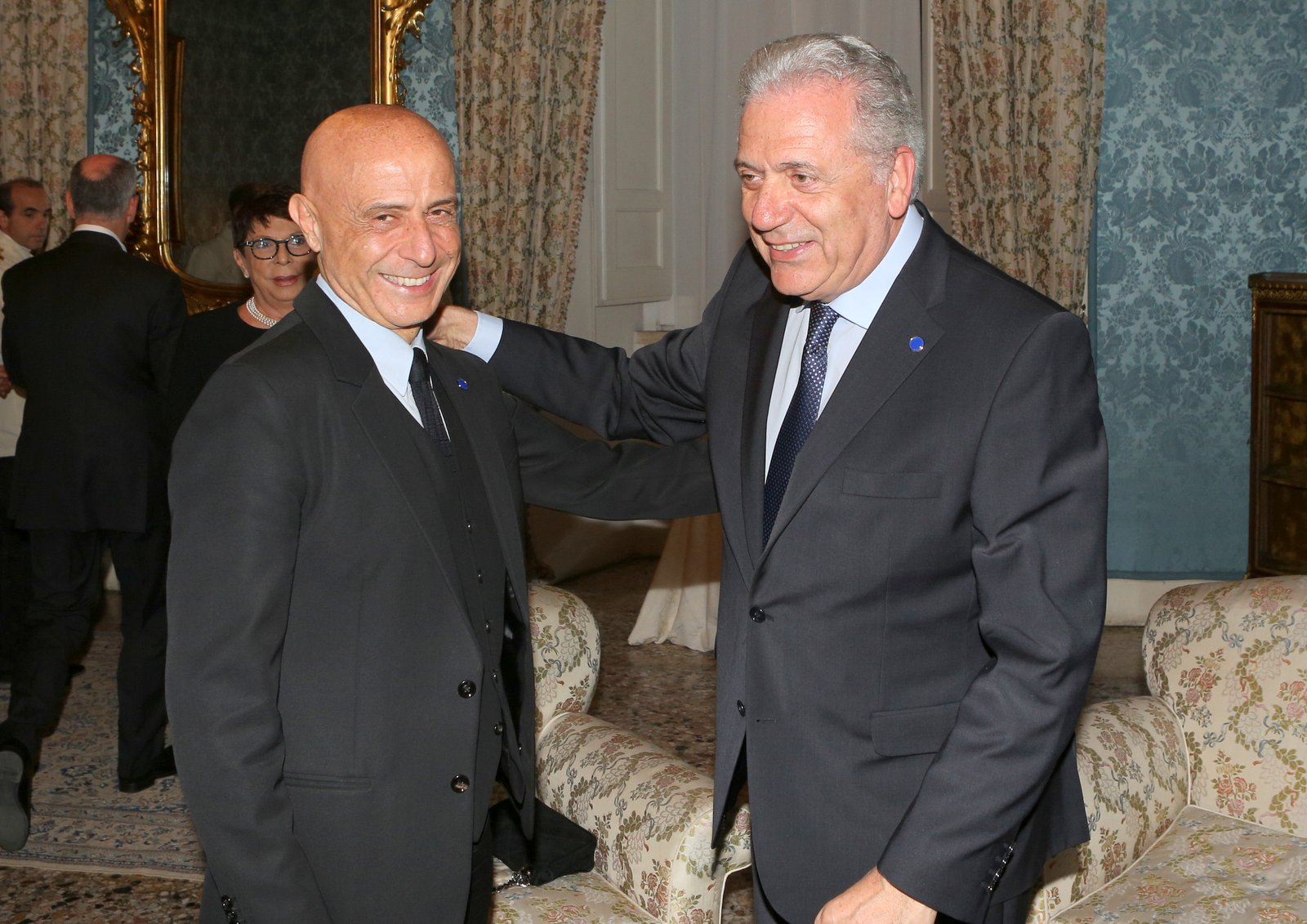
Minniti with EU Commissioner Dimitris Avramopoulos in 2017

In July 2017, he promoted the so-called "Minniti Code", which must be subscribed by the NGOs that are involved in rescuing asylum seekers in the Mediterranean. Among other things, the code forbids NGO vessels entering Libyan territorial waters. Minniti warned those NGOs who did not sign the pact that they have set themselves "outside of the organised system for rescue at sea".

Some NGOs refused to sign the new code of conduct; Médecins Sans Frontières (MSF) was the first charity to officially announce its refusal of the code, saying that there were no conditions under which to sign. Facing growing public discontent and scrutiny by the Italian, Libyan, and EU authorities, MSF had to suspend its activities in the Mediterranean sea. The German NGO, Sea Watch, said that the code was "largely illegal" and "will not save lives but will have the opposite effect".

=== Macerata shooting ===
In his last year as Minister of the Interior, Minniti faced the important issue related to a right-wing terrorist shooting occurred in Macerata by a 28-year-old man, inviting political parties to tone moderation and harshly condemning the attack, saying that no political party must "ride the hate".

== After the government ==
On 18 November 2018, Minniti announced his candidacy for the 2019 leadership election to become the new party's secretary. Minniti was supported by Matteo Renzi, former Prime Minister and party's leader, who led a liberal and centrist faction within the PD. He was also supported by former Minister of Economic Development Carlo Calenda, who was considered by many a strong potential candidate for the leadership election, and the former Minister of Economy and Finance Pier Carlo Padoan. However, on 5 December, 17 days after having announced his candidacy, Minniti withdrew from the race, saying to do so in order to facilitate the path of the party primaries and with the sole intent to encourage the election of an authoritative secretary.
