= Emiliano Fossi =

Italian politician (born 1973)

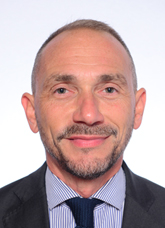
- Fossi in 2022

Member of the Chamber of Deputies
- Incumbent
- Assumed office 13 October 2022
- Constituency: Tuscany – 08

Personal details
- Born: 2 September 1973 (age 52)
- Party: Democratic Party (since 2007)

Emiliano Fossi (born 2 September 1973) is an Italian politician serving as a member of the Chamber of Deputies since 2022. From 2013 to 2022, he served as mayor of Campi Bisenzio.
