= Vincenzo Napoli (politician) =

Italian politician

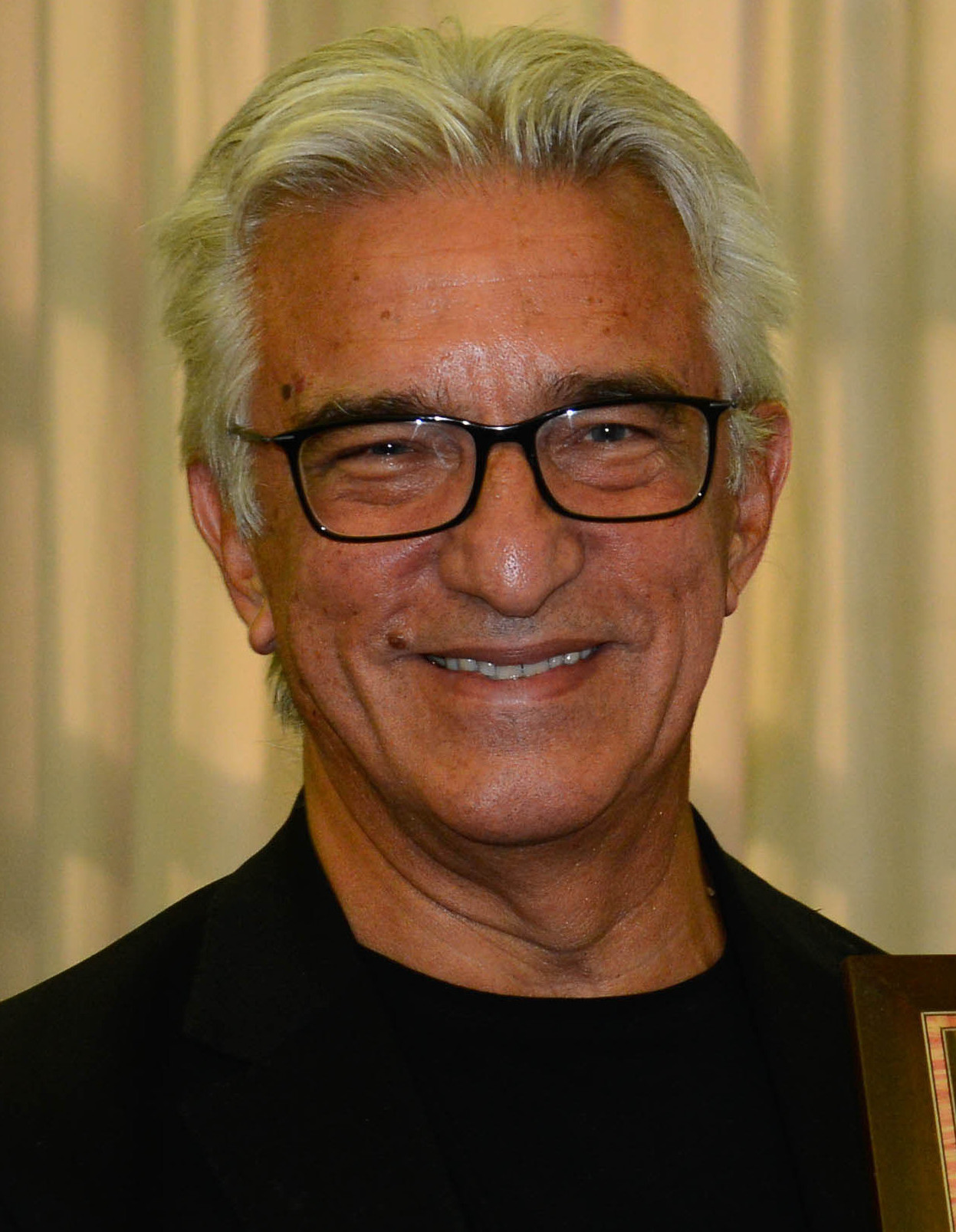

Mayor of Salerno
- In office 14 June 2016 – 6 February 2026
- Preceded by: Vincenzo De Luca
- Succeeded by: Vincenzo De Luca

President of the Province of Salerno
- In office 6 April 2025 – 6 February 2026
- Preceded by: Francesco Alfieri
- Succeeded by: Giuseppe Parente

Personal details
- Born: 30 July 1950 (age 76) Salerno, Campania, Italy
- Party: PSI (1980–1994); PDS (1994–1998); DS (1998–2007); PD (since 2007)
- Education: University of Naples Federico II
- Profession: architect

Vincenzo Napoli (born 30 July 1950) is an Italian politician.

A member of the Democratic Party, he was elected Mayor of Salerno on 5 June 2016 and took office on 14 June. He was re-elected for a second term in October 2021. In April 2025, he was elected president of the Province of Salerno.

In January 2026, Napoli resigned from his positions as mayor and president of the province, officially stepping down from both offices on 6 February 2026.

== Biography ==
After earning his high school diploma in his hometown and a degree in architecture with a grade of 110 from the University of Naples Federico II, he became a licensed architect by registering with the Salerno Chapter of the Order of Architects. From 1989 to 1991, he served as a council member of the Order of Architects of the Province of Salerno. He is married and has one daughter: Paola (born 1999).

== See also ==
- 2016 Italian local elections
- List of mayors of Salerno

Political offices
Preceded by Vincenzo De Luca	Mayor of Salerno; 2016–2026	Succeeded by Vincenzo De Luca
