= List of members of the Chamber of Deputies of Italy, 2018–2022 =

This is a list of the 630 members of the Italian Chamber of Deputies that were elected in the 2018 general election.

== Five Star Movement ==
- Cosimo Adelizzi
- Davide Aiello
- Roberta Alaimo
- Maria Soave Alemanno
- Alessandro Amitrano
- Giovanni Luca Aresta
- Stefania Ascari
- Lucia Azzolina
- Vittoria Baldino
- Elisabetta Maria Barbuto
- Valentina Barzotti
- Sergio Battelli
- Marco Bella
- Francesco Berti
- Anna Bilotti
- Alfonso Bonafede
- Giuseppe Brescia
- Raffaele Bruno
- Stefano Buffagni
- Giuseppe Buompane
- Francesca Businarolo
- Luciano Cadeddu
- Azzurra Pia Maria Cancelleri
- Luciano Cantone
- Luca Carabetta
- Alessandra Carbonaro
- Paola Carinelli
- Vittoria Casa
- Andrea Caso
- Gianpaolo Cassese
- Laura Castelli
- Roberto Cataldi
- Maurizio Cattoi
- Giuseppe Chiazzese
- Luciano Cillis
- Rosalba Cimino
- Tiziana Ciprini
- Claudio Cominardi
- Valentina Corneli
- Davide Crippa
- Sebastiano Cubeddu
- Giovanni Currò
- Fabiana Dadone
- Federica Daga
- Celeste D'Arrando
- Sabrina De Carlo
- Paola Deiana
- Daniele Del Grosso
- Antonio Del Monaco
- Diego De Lorenzis
- Emanuela Del Re
- Margherita Del Sesto
- Federica Dieni
- Carmen Di Lauro
- Luigi Di Maio
- Federico D'Incà
- Giuseppe D'Ippolito
- Gianfranco Di Sarno
- Iolanda Di Stasio
- Manlio Di Stefano
- Leonardo Donno
- Devis Dori
- Valentina D'Orso
- Francesco D'Uva
- Mirella Emiliozzi
- Mattia Fantinati
- Marialuisa Faro
- Antonio Federico
- Vittorio Ferraresi
- Paolo Ficara
- Roberto Fico
- Francesca Flati
- Ilaria Fontana
- Riccardo Fraccaro
- Luca Frusone
- Chiara Gagnarli
- Francesca Galizia
- Filippo Gallinella
- Luigi Gallo
- Andrea Giarrizzo
- Conny Giordano
- Carla Giuliano
- Marta Grande
- Giulia Grillo
- Nicola Grimaldi
- Carmela Grippa
- Michele Gubitosa
- Angela Ianaro
- Niccolò Invidia
- Marianna Iorio
- Luigi Iovino
- Giuseppe L'Abbate
- Caterina Licatini
- Mirella Liuzzi
- Marialucia Lorefice
- Gabriele Lorenzoni
- Giorgio Lovecchio
- Anna Macina
- Pasquale Maglione
- Stefania Mammì
- Alberto Manca
- Teresa Manzo
- Generoso Maraia
- Bernardo Marino
- Vita Martinciglio
- Maria Marzana
- Angela Masi
- Alessandro Melicchio
- Salvatore Micillo
- Luca Migliorino
- Carmelo Massimo Misiti
- Iolanda Nanni (until 08/27/2018)
- Silvana Nappi
- Dalila Nesci
- Riccardo Olgiati
- Anna Laura Orrico
- Maria Pallini
- Valentina Palmisano
- Antonella Papiro
- Paolo Parentela
- Leonardo Salvatore Penna
- Mario Perantoni
- Filippo Giuseppe Perconti
- Dedalo Cosimo Gaetano Pignatone
- Nicola Provenza
- Angela Raffa
- Riccardo Ricciardi
- Gianluca Rizzo
- Roberto Rossini
- Francesca Anna Ruggiero
- Carla Ruocco
- Eugenio Saitta
- Angela Salafia
- Giulia Sarti
- Emanuele Scagliusi
- Lucia Scanu
- Filippo Scerra
- Elisa Scutellà
- Enrica Segneri
- Davide Serritella
- Carlo Sibilia
- Francesco Silvestri
- Vincenzo Spadafora
- Maria Edera Spadoni
- Gilda Sportiello
- Luca Sut
- Patrizia Terzoni
- Angelo Tofalo
- Daniela Torto
- Roberto Traversi
- Davide Tripiedi
- Elisa Tripodi
- Francesca Troiano
- Riccardo Tucci
- Manuel Tuzzi
- Gianluca Vacca
- Simone Valente
- Adriano Varrica
- Giovanni Vianello
- Stefano Vignaroli
- Virginia Villani
- Davide Zanichelli
- Alberto Zolezzi

== Lega – Salvini Premier ==
- Giorgia Andreuzza
- Mirco Badole
- Giuseppe Basini
- Alex Bazzaro
- Giuseppe Ercole Bellachioma
- Daniele Belotti
- Alessandro Manuel Benvenuto
- Matteo Luigi Bianchi
- Simone Billi
- Diego Binelli
- Ingrid Bisa
- Massimo Bitonci
- Rossana Boldi
- Fabio Massimo Boniardi
- Simona Bordonali
- Claudio Borghi
- Aurelia Bubisutti
- Gualtiero Caffaratto
- Gianluca Cantalamessa
- Virginio Caparvi
- Massimilianio Capitanio
- Maurizio Carrara
- Giuseppina Castiello
- Vanessa Cattoi
- Laura Cavandoli
- Fabrizio Cecchetti
- Giulio Centemero
- Emanuele Cestari
- Dimitri Coin
- Jari Colla
- Angela Colmellere
- Silvana Andreina Comaroli
- Vito Comencini
- Silvia Covolo
- Andrea Crippa
- Andrea Dara
- Sara De Angelis
- Guido De Martini
- Luigi D'Eramo
- Flavio Di Muro
- Luis Roberto Di San Martino Lorenzato di Ivrea
- Giuseppe Cesare Donina
- Claudio Durigon
- Marica Fantuz
- Massimiliano Fedriga (until 05/08/2018)
- Roberto Paolo Ferrari
- Benedetta Fiorini
- Ketty Fogliani
- Lorenzo Fontana
- Paolo Formentini
- Sara Foscolo
- Rebecca Frassini
- Maurizio Fugatti (until 01/09/2019)
- Domenico Furgiuele
- Dario Galli
- Massimo Garavaglia
- Flavio Gastaldi
- Vannia Gava
- Francesca Gerardi
- Antonino Germanà
- Andrea Giaccone
- Antonietta Giacometti
- Alessandro Giglio Vigna
- Giancarlo Giorgetti
- Claudia Gobbato
- Guglielmo Golinelli
- Paolo Grimoldi
- Guido Guidesi (until 02/17/2021)
- Alberto Luigi Gusmeroli
- Igor Giancarlo Iezzi
- Christian Invernizzi
- Giorgia Latini (until 11/10/2020)
- Arianna Lazzarini
- Donatella Legnaioli
- Marzio Liuni
- Alessandra Locatelli (until 02/17/2021)
- Mario Lolini
- Eva Lorenzoni
- Martina Loss
- Elena Lucchini
- Mauro Lucentini
- Elena Maccanti
- Marco Maggioni
- Franco Manzato
- Riccardo Augusto Marchetti
- Felice Mariani
- Filippo Maturi
- Matteo Micheli
- Antonino Minardo
- Riccardo Molinaro
- Nicola Molteni
- Alessandro Morelli
- Jacopo Morrone
- Daniele Moschioni
- Elena Murelli
- Alessandro Pagano
- Massimiliano Panizzut
- Giuseppe Paolin
- Luca Rodolfo Paolini
- Ugo Parolo
- Tullio Patassini
- Cristina Patelli
- Paolo Paternoster
- Lino Pettazzi
- Carlo Piastra
- Guglielmo Picchi
- Tiziana Piccolo
- Manfredi Potenti
- Erik Umberto Pretto
- Giacomo Racchella
- Elena Raffaelli
- Laura Ravetto
- Alberto Ribolla
- Edoardo Rixi
- Barbara Saltamartini
- Rossano Sasso
- Stefania Segnana (until 01/09/2019)
- Silvana Snider
- Alberto Stefani
- Mauro Sutto
- Leonardo Tarantino
- Anna Rita Tateo
- Claudia Maria Terzi (until 06/27/2018)
- Paolo Tiramani
- Luca Toccalini
- Maura Tomasi
- Giovanni Battista Tombolato
- Gianni Tonelli
- Roberto Turri
- Vania Valbusa
- Sergio Vallotto
- Lorenzo Viviani
- Raffaele Volpi
- Federica Zanella
- Giulia Zanotelli (until 01/09/2019)
- Antonio Zennaro
- Francesco Zicchieri
- Edoardo Ziello
- Eugenio Zoffili
- Adolfo Zordan

== Democratic Party (Italy) ==
- Anna Ascani
- Eva Avossa
- Alfredo Bazoli
- Gianluca Benamati
- Marina Berlinghieri
- Francesco Boccia
- Laura Boldrini
- Francesca Bonomo
- Michele Bordo
- Enrico Borghi
- Chiara Braga
- Vincenza Bruno Bossio
- Umberto Buratti
- Michela Campana
- Laura Cantini
- Carla Cantone
- Santi Cappellani
- Nicola Carè
- Elena Carnevali
- Andrea Casu (from 10/04/2021)
- Stefano Ceccanti
- Susanna Cenni
- Graziella Leyla Ciagà
- Lucia Ciampi
- Francesco Critelli
- Cecilia D'Elia (from 16/01/2022)
- Gian Pietro Del Moro
- Vito De Filippo
- Umberto Del Basso De Caro
- Graziano Delrio
- Piero De Luca
- Andrea De Maria
- Roger De Menech
- Paola De Micheli
- Rosa Maria Di Giorgi
- David Ermini (until 25/09/2018)
- Piero Fassino
- Emanuele Fiano
- Gian Mario Fragomeli
- Andrea Frailis
- Dario Franceschini
- Davide Gariglio
- Paolo Gentiloni Silveri (until 12/02/2019)
- Antonello Giacomelli (until 09/30/2020)
- Andrea Giorgis
- Chiara Gribaudo
- Roberto Gualtieri
- Lorenzo Guerini
- Antonella Incerti
- Marco Lacarra
- Francesca La Marca
- Paolo Lattanzio
- Stefano Lepri
- Enrico Letta (from 10/04/21)
- Beatrice Lorenzin
- Alberto Losacco
- Luca Lotti
- Maria Anna Madia
- Gavino Manca
- Claudio Mancini
- Maurizio Martina (until 01/20/2021)
- Matteo Mauri
- Fabio Melilli
- Carmelo Miceli
- Marco Minniti (until 03/11/2021)
- Alessia Morani
- Roberto Morassut
- Mario Morgoni
- Romina Mura
- Martina Nardi
- Pietro Navarra
- Michele Nitti
- Matteo Orfini
- Andrea Orlando
- Pietro Carlo Padoan (until 11/04/2020)
- Alberto Pagani
- Ubaldo Pagano
- Nicola Pellicani
- Stefania Pezzopane
- Flavia Piccoli Nardelli
- Giuditta Pini
- Luciano Pizzetti
- Barbara Pollastrini
- Patrizia Prestipino
- Lia Quartapelle Procopio
- Fausto Raciti
- Luca Rizzo Nervo
- Andrea Romano
- Andrea Rossi
- Alessia Rotta
- Giovanni Sanga (until 04/13/2021)
- Luca Sani
- Angela Schirò
- Filippo Sensi
- Debora Serracchiani
- Paolo Siani
- Serse Soverini
- Raffaele Topo
- Franco Vazio
- Walter Verini
- Antonio Viscomi
- Alessandro Zan
- Diego Zardini

== Forza Italia ==
- Antonio Angelucci
- Valentina Aprea
- Roberto Bagnasco
- Simone Baldelli
- Paolo Barelli
- Anna Lisa Baroni
- Giusi Bartolozzi
- Alessandro Battilocchio
- Deborah Bergamini
- Dario Bond
- Michela Vittoria Brambilla
- Renato Brunetta
- Annagrazia Calabria
- Pasquale Cannatelli
- Francesco Cannizzaro
- Roberto Caon
- Ugo Cappellacci
- Maria Rosaria Carfagna
- Luigi Casciello
- Michele Casino
- Roberto Cassinelli
- Alessandro Cattaneo
- Piergiorgio Cortelazzo
- Mirella Cristina
- Mauro D'Attis
- Vincenzo Fasano
- Marta Antonia Fascina
- Carlo Fatuzzo
- Marzia Ferraioli
- Fucsia Fitzgerald Nissoli
- Gregorio Fontana
- Mariastella Gelmini
- Carlo Giacometto
- Sestino Giacomoni
- Domenico Giannetta (until 05/07/2020)
- Veronica Giannone
- Vincenza Labriola
- Andrea Mandelli
- Patrizia Marrocco
- Antonio Martino
- Erica Mazzetti
- Lorena Milanato
- Giorgio Mulè
- Graziano Musella
- Raffaele Nevi
- Roberto Novelli
- Roberto Occhiuto
- Andrea Orsini
- Antonio Palmieri
- Roberto Pella
- Antonio Pentangelo
- Matteo Perego Di Cremnago
- Pietro Pittalis
- Catia Polidori
- Renata Polverini
- Claudia Porchietto
- Stefania Prestigiacomo
- Cristina Rossello
- Roberto Rosso
- Gianfranco Rotondi
- Andrea Ruggieri
- Paolo Russo
- Gloria Saccani Jotti
- Jole Santelli (until 03/30/2020)
- Carlo Sarro
- Elvira Savino
- Sandra Savino
- Matilde Siracusano
- Francesco Paolo Sisto
- Diego Sozzani
- Maria Spena
- Luca Squeri
- Annaelsa Tartaglione
- Sergio Torromino
- Maria Tripodi
- Valentino Valentini
- Giuseppina Versace
- Elio Vito
- Pierantonio Zanttin
- Paolo Zangrillo

== Mixed Group ==
=== Independents ===
- Nadia Aprile
- Silvia Benedetti
- Stefano Benigni
- Emilio Carelli
- Jessica Costanzo
- Sara Cunial
- Giuseppe D'Ambrosio
- Rosalba De Giorgi
- Yana Chiara Ehm
- Flora Frate
- Rosa Menga
- Andrea Mura (until 09/27/2018)
- Maria Laura Paxia
- Raphael Raduzzi
- Cristian Romaniello
- Michela Rostan
- Giovanni Russo
- Doriana Sarli
- Elisa Siragusa
- Michele Sodano
- Alessandro Sorte
- Simona Suriano
- Guia Termini
- Giorgio Trizzino
- Alessio Mattia Villarosa
- Gloria Vizzini

=== L'Alternativa c'è ===
- Massimo Enrico Baroni
- Pino Cabras
- Andrea Colletti
- Emanuela Corda
- Francesco Forciniti
- Paolo Giuliodori
- Alvise Maniero
- Paolo Nicolò Romano
- Francesco Sapia
- Arianna Spessotto
- Rosa Alba Testamento
- Raffaele Trano
- Andrea Vallascas
- Leda Volpi

=== Democratic Centre ===
- Nicola Acunzo
- Piera Aiello
- Daniela Cardinale
- Alessandra Ermellino
- Mara Lapia
- Carmelo Lo Monte
- Bruno Tabacci

=== Let's Make Eco–Federation of the Greens ===
- Andrea Cecconi
- Lorenzo Fioramonti
- Alessandro Fusacchia
- Antonio Lombardo
- Rossella Muroni

=== Us with Italy–USEI–Renaissance–AdC ===
- Alessandro Colucci
- Maurizio Lupi
- Eugenio Sangregorio
- Vittorio Sgarbi
- Renzo Tondo

=== Linguistic Minorities (SVP–PATT) ===
- Renate Gebhard
- Albrecht Plangger
- Emanuela Rossini
- Manfred Schullian

=== Action–More Europe–Italian Radicals ===
- Nunzio Angiola
- Enrico Costa
- Riccardo Magi

=== MAIE–PSI ===
- Mario Alejandro Borghese
- Fausto Longo
- Antonio Tasso

== Brothers of Italy ==
- Francesco Acquaroli (until 10/22/2020)
- Lucia Albano
- Maria Teresa Bellucci
- Galeazzo Bignami
- Carmela Bucalo
- Alessio Butti
- Salvatore Caiata
- Maria Cristina Caretta
- Monica Ciaburro
- Edmondo Cirielli
- Guido Crosetto (until 03/13/2019)
- Salvatore Deidda
- Andrea Delmastro Delle Vedove
- Massimiliano De Toma
- Giovanni Donzelli
- Wanda Ferro
- Carlo Fidanza (until 06/27/2019)
- Tommaso Foti
- Paola Frassinetti
- Davide Galantino
- Marcello Gemmato
- Francesco Lollobrigida
- Ylenja Lucaselli
- Lucrezia Maria Benedetta Mantovani
- Ciro Maschio
- Giorgia Meloni
- Federico Mollicone
- Augusta Montaruli
- Marco Osnato
- Emanuele Prisco
- Fabio Rampelli
- Walter Rizzetto
- Mauro Rotelli
- Rachele Silvestri
- Marco Silvestroni
- Paolo Trancassini
- Maria Carolina Varchi
- Gianluca Vinci
- Riccardo Zucconi

== Italia Viva ==
- Lucia Annibali
- Michele Anzaldi
- Davide Bendinelli
- Maria Elena Boschi
- Matteo Colaninno
- Camillo D'Alessandro
- Mauro Del Barba
- Marco Di Maio
- Cosimo Maria Ferri
- Silvia Fregolent
- Maria Chiara Gadda
- Roberto Giachetti
- Gianfranco Librandi
- Luigi Marattin
- Gennaro Migliore
- Mattia Mor
- Sara Moretto
- Luciano Nobili
- Lisa Noja
- Giuseppina Occhionero
- Raffaella Paita
- Giacomo Portas
- Ettore Rosato
- Ivan Scalfarotto
- Francesco Scoma
- Gabriele Toccafondi
- Massimo Ungaro
- Catello Vitiello

== Courage Italy ==
- Maria Teresa Baldini
- Raffaele Baratto
- Fabio Berardini
- Michaela Biancofiore
- Fabiola Bologna
- Matteo Dall'Osso
- Carlo Ugo De Girolamo
- Guido Della Frera
- Felice Maurizio D'Ettore
- Manuela Gagliardi
- Marco Marin
- Stefano Mugnai
- Osvaldo Napoli
- Martina Parisse
- Claudio Pedrazzini
- Guido Germano Pettarin
- Elisabetta Ripani
- Marco Rizzone
- Gianluca Rospi
- Daniela Ruffino
- Cosimo Sibilia
- Giorgio Silli
- Simona Vietina

== Free and Equal ==
- Pier Luigi Bersani
- Federico Conte
- Rina De Lorenzo
- Ettore Guglielmo Epifani
- Stefano Fassina
- Federico Fornaro
- Nicola Fratoianni
- Erasmo Palazzotto
- Luca Pastorino
- Roberto Speranza
- Nicola Stumpo
