= Tuscany (Chamber of Deputies constituency) =

Constituency of the Italian lower house

- Chamber of Deputies; Electoral constituency
- Region: Tuscany
- Electorate: 2,841,131 (2018)
- Major settlements: Arezzo, Florence, Grosseto, Livorno, Lucca, Massa, Pisa, Pistoia, Prato, Siena

Current constituency
- Created: 1993
- Seats: 39
- Members: PD (15); FI (7); M5S (6); Lega (6); FdI (2); LeU (1); CP (1)

Tuscany is one of the 29 constituencies (Italian: circoscrizioni) represented in the Chamber of Deputies, the lower house of the Italian parliament. The constituency currently elects 39 deputies. Its boundaries correspond to those of the Italian region of Tuscany. The electoral system uses a parallel voting system, which act as a mixed system, with 37% of seats allocated using a first-past-the-post electoral system and 61% using a proportional method, with one round of voting.

The constituency was first established by the Mattarella law on 4 August 1993 and later confirmed by the Calderoli law on 21 December 2005 and by the Rosato law on 3 November 2017.

== Members of the Parliament ==
=== 2018–2022 ===
Single-member districts
District			Deputy	Party
N.	Name	Map	Deputy	Party
01	Florence Centre		Gabriele Toccafondi	Civica Popolare, then Italia Viva
02	Florence Scandicci		Rosa Maria Di Giorgi	Democratic Party
03	Sesto Fiorentino		Roberto Giachetti	Democratic Party, then Italia Viva
04	Empoli		Luca Lotti	Democratic Party
05	Prato		Giorgio Silli	Forza Italia, then Coraggio Italia
06	Pistoia		Maurizio Carrara	Forza Italia, then Lega
07	Arezzo		Felice Maurizio D'Ettore	Forza Italia, then Coraggio Italia
08	Massa		Deborah Bergamini	Forza Italia
09	Lucca		Riccardo Zucconi	Brothers of Italy
10	Pisa		Edoardo Ziello	Lega
11	Poggibonsi		Susanna Cenni	Democratic Party
12	Siena		Pier Carlo Padoan then Enrico Letta	Democratic Party
13	Livorno		Andrea Romano	Democratic Party
14	Grosseto		Mario Lolini	Lega

Multi-member districts
District			Party	Deputy
N.	Name	Map	Party	Deputy
01	Tuscany 01		PD	Antonello Giacomelli then Luca Sani
01	Tuscany 01		PD	Martina Nardi
01	Tuscany 01		M5S	Riccardo Ricciardi
01	Tuscany 01		M5S	Gloria Vizzini
01	Tuscany 01		Lega	Guglielmo Picchi
01	Tuscany 01		FI	Erica Mazzetti
01	Tuscany 01		FdI	Giovanni Donzelli
02	Tuscany 02		PD	Stefano Ceccanti
02	Tuscany 02		PD	Lucia Ciampi
02	Tuscany 02		M5S	Francesco Berti
02	Tuscany 02		Lega	Claudio Borghi
03	Tuscany 03		PD	Laura Cantini
03	Tuscany 03		PD	David Ermini then Umberto Buratti
03	Tuscany 03		M5S	Alfonso Bonafede
03	Tuscany 03		M5S	Yana Chiara Ehm
03	Tuscany 03		Lega	Donatella Legnaioli
03	Tuscany 03		FI	Stefano Mugnai
03	Tuscany 03		Article One	Roberto Speranza
04	Tuscany 04		PD	Cosimo Ferri
04	Tuscany 04		PD	Alessia Rotta
04	Tuscany 04		M5S	Chiara Gagnarli
04	Tuscany 04		M5S	Luca Migliorino
04	Tuscany 04		Lega	Manfredi Potenti
04	Tuscany 04		FI	Elisabetta Ripani
