= List of Italian constituencies =

This is a list of Italian constituencies from 1946 to present. For the election of the Italian Chamber of Deputies, since 1993 Italy is divided in 27 districts called circoscrizioni. However, the distribution of seats being calculated at national level, districts serve only to choose the single candidates inside the party lists. During the election of the Italian Senate, according to the Constitution, each Region is a single district, without connections at national level.

During the Regional elections, the districts correspond to the Provinces, even if some seats are allocated at regional level. For the Provincial elections, a special system is used, based on localized lists: even if the competition is disputed on provincial level, candidates are presented in single-member districts, and their final position inside each party list depends by the percentage of votes they received in their own districts. Finally, for the Communal elections no districts are used.

== Electoral districts for the Chamber of Deputies from 2006 to 2018 ==
=== Aosta Valley ===
Deputies for Aosta Valley (2006–2018)
Key to parties ALD AV
Legislature	Election	Distribution
15th	2006	1
16th	2008	1
17th	2013	1

=== Piedmont 1 ===
Deputies for Piedmont 1 (2006–2018)
Key to parties PRC PdCI SEL Ulivo/PD FdV IdV RnP M5S SC UDC FI/PdL AN LN
Legislature	Election	Distribution
15th	2006	2 / 1 / 9 / 1 / 1 / 1 / 5 / 3 / 1
16th	2008	9 / 2 / 1 / 9 / 3
17th	2013	2 / 11 / 4 / 2 / 3 / 1

=== Piedmont 2 ===
Deputies for Piedmont 2 (2006–2018)
Key to parties PRC PdCI SEL Ulivo/PD IdV RnP M5S NPSI SC UDC FI/PdL AN FdI LN
Legislature	Election	Distribution
15th	2006	1 / 1 / 7 / 1 / 1 / 1 / 1 / 5 / 2 / 2
16th	2008	6 / 1 / 1 / 10 / 5
17th	2013	1 / 10 / 4 / 2 / 3 / 1 / 1

=== Lombardy 1 ===
Deputies for Lombardy 1 (2006–2018)
Key to parties PRC PdCI SEL Ulivo/PD FdV IdV RnP M5S SC UDC FI/PdL AN FdI LN
Legislature	Election	Distribution
15th	2006	3 / 1 / 14 / 1 / 1 / 1 / 2 / 10 / 4 / 3
16th	2008	13 / 2 / 1 / 16 / 8
17th	2013	2 / 21 / 6 / 3 / 5 / 1 / 2

=== Lombardy 2 ===
Deputies for Lombardy 2 (2006–2018)
Key to parties PRC PdCI SEL Ulivo/PD FdV IdV RnP M5S SC UDC FI/PdL AN LN
Legislature	Election	Distribution
15th	2006	2 / 1 / 13 / 1 / 1 / 1 / 3 / 11 / 4 / 6
16th	2008	10 / 2 / 2 / 15 / 14
17th	2013	2 / 20 / 6 / 4 / 7 / 6

=== Lombardy 3 ===
Deputies for Lombardy 3 (2006–2018)
Key to parties PRC SEL Ulivo/PD UDEUR M5S SC UDC FI/PdL AN FdI LN
Legislature	Election	Distribution
15th	2006	1 / 6 / 1 / 1 / 3 / 1 / 2
16th	2008	5 / 1 / 6 / 3
17th	2013	1 / 8 / 2 / 1 / 2 / 1 / 1

=== Veneto 1 ===
Deputies for Veneto 1 (2006–2018)
Key to parties PRC PdCI SEL Ulivo/PD FdV IdV RnP M5S SC UDC FI/PdL AN FdI LN
Legislature	Election	Distribution
15th	2006	1 / 9 / 1 / 1 / 1 / 3 / 7 / 3 / 3
16th	2008	8 / 1 / 2 / 10 / 9
17th	2013	1 / 13 / 6 / 2 / 1 / 5 / 3

=== Veneto 2 ===
Deputies for Veneto 2 (2006–2018)
Key to parties PRC PdCI SEL Ulivo/PD FdV IdV RnP M5S SC UDC FI/PdL AN FdI LN
Legislature	Election	Distribution
15th	2006	1 / 7 / 1 / 1 / 1 / 5 / 2 / 2
16th	2008	6 / 1 / 2 / 6 / 6
17th	2013	1 / 9 / 4 / 2 / 2 / 2

== 2018 to present ==
- Abruzzo (Chamber of Deputies constituency)
- Aosta Valley (Chamber of Deputies constituency)
- Apulia (Chamber of Deputies constituency)
- Basilicata (Chamber of Deputies constituency)
- Calabria (Chamber of Deputies constituency)
- Campania 1 (Chamber of Deputies constituency)
- Campania 2 (Chamber of Deputies constituency)
- Template:Chamber of Deputies constituencies in Italy
- Emilia-Romagna (Chamber of Deputies constituency)
- Friuli-Venezia Giulia (Chamber of Deputies constituency)
- Lazio 1 (Chamber of Deputies constituency)
- Lazio 2 (Chamber of Deputies constituency)
- Liguria (Chamber of Deputies constituency)
- Lombardy 1 (Chamber of Deputies constituency)
- Lombardy 2 (Chamber of Deputies constituency)
- Lombardy 3 (Chamber of Deputies constituency)
- Lombardy 4 (Chamber of Deputies constituency)
- Marche (Chamber of Deputies constituency)
- Molise (Chamber of Deputies constituency)
- Overseas (Chamber of Deputies constituency)
- Overseas (Senate of the Republic constituency)
- Piedmont 1 (Chamber of Deputies constituency)
- Piedmont 2 (Chamber of Deputies constituency)
- Sardinia (Chamber of Deputies constituency)
- Sicily 1 (Chamber of Deputies constituency)
- Sicily 2 (Chamber of Deputies constituency)
- Trentino-Alto Adige/Südtirol (Chamber of Deputies constituency)
- Tuscany (Chamber of Deputies constituency)
- Umbria (Chamber of Deputies constituency)
- Veneto 1 (Chamber of Deputies constituency)
- Veneto 2 (Chamber of Deputies constituency)

== See also ==
- Overseas constituencies of the Italian Parliament
