= Endorsements in the 2020 Italian constitutional referendum =

Feltri, Mattia (20 August 2020). "Appello ai costituzionalisti". HuffPost Italia (in Italian). This page lists individuals and organisations who publicly expressed an opinion regarding the 2020 Italian constitutional referendum.

== Yes ==
=== Members of the government and institutions ===
==== Presidents of the Senate ====
Former

==== Presidents of the Chamber of Deputies ====
- Roberto Fico, President of the Chamber of Deputies (M5S) (2018–today)

Former

==== Prime Ministers ====
- Giuseppe Conte, 58th Prime Minister (Independent) (2018–2021)

Former

- Enrico Letta, 55th Prime Minister (PD) (2013–2014)

==== Ministers ====
- Luigi Di Maio, Minister of Foreign Affairs (M5S) (2019–today)
- Riccardo Fraccaro, Secretary of the Council of Ministers (M5S) (2019–today)

Former

- Mara Carfagna, Minister for Equal Opportunities (FI) (2008–2011)
- Mariastella Gelmini, Minister of Education, University and Research (FI) (2008–2011)
- Maurizio Martina, Minister of Agricultural, Food and Forestry Policies (PD) (2014–2018)
- Marco Minniti, Minister of the Interior (PD) (2016–2018)
- Matteo Salvini, Minister of the Interior (Lega) (2018–2019)

=== Members of local governments ===
==== Presidents of Regions ====
Current

- Stefano Bonaccini, President of Emilia-Romagna (PD) (2014–today)
- Giovanni Toti, President of Liguria (C!) (2015–today)
- Nicola Zingaretti, President of Lazio (PD) (2013–today)

==== Mayors of main cities ====
Current

- Dario Nardella, Mayor of Florence (PD) (2014–today)

=== Members of the Parliament ===
==== Members of the Chamber of Deputies ====
- Giuseppe Brescia (M5S)
- Stefano Ceccanti (PD)
- Francesco D'Uva (M5S)
- Stefano Fassina (PeC)
- Andrea Marcucci (PD)
- Andrea Romano (PD)

Former

==== Members of the Senate of the Republic ====
- Albert Lanièce (UV)
- Gianni Marilotti (M5S)
- Dario Parrini (PD)
- Stefano Ceccanti (PD)

Former

- Pietro Ichino (PD)
- Enrico Morando (PD)

=== International figures ===
==== Members of the European Parliament ====
- Ignazio Corrao (M5S)
- Dino Giarrusso (M5S)

=== Notable individuals ===
==== Journalists, commentators, and political satirists ====
- Giuliano Ferrara
- Claudio Cerasa
- Beppe Severgnini
- Antonio Polito
- Massimo Giletti
- Giovanni Floris

==== Constitutional judges and lawyer ====
- Carlo Fusaro, jurist
- Valerio Onida, former President of the Constitutional Court of Italy
- Lorenza Carlassare, jurist
- Stefano Ceccanti, jurist and senator for the Democratic Party;

==== Others ====
- Tito Boeri, former President of the National Institute for Social Security (2014–2019)

=== Organisations ===
==== Committees ====
Logo	Campaign	Slogan	Spokesperson	Website
	Yes of the Liberties	Il sì delle Libertà	Silvia Ferrara and Pietro Paganini	www.ilsidelleliberta.it

==== Main political parties ====
Parties	Political orientation	Leader	Ref
League (Lega)	Right-wing populism	Matteo Salvini	
Democratic Party (PD)	Social democracy	Nicola Zingaretti	
Five Star Movement (M5S)	Populism	Vito Crimi	
Forza Italia (FI)	Liberal conservatism	Silvio Berlusconi	
Brothers of Italy (FdI)	National conservatism	Giorgia Meloni	
Article One (Art. 1)	Social democracy	Roberto Speranza	
South Tyrolean People's Party (SVP)	Regionalism	Arno Kompatscher	
Cambiamo! (C!)	Liberal conservatism	Giovanni Toti	

==== Newspapers ====
Newspapers	Political and cultural orientation
Il Fatto Quotidiano	Populism, Anti-establishment
La Notizia	Populism
Il Foglio	Liberal conservatism

== No ==
=== Members of the government and institutions ===
==== Presidents of the Senate ====
Former

- Pietro Grasso, 21st President of the Senate of the Republic (LeU) (2013–2018)
- Marcello Pera, 18th President of the Senate of the Republic (FI) (2001–2006)

==== Presidents of the Chamber of Deputies ====
Former

- Laura Boldrini, 14th President of the Chamber of Deputies (PD) (2013–2018)
- Pier Ferdinando Casini, 11th President of the Chamber of Deputies (CpE) (2001–2006)
- Luciano Violante, 10th President of the Chamber of Deputies (PD) (1996–2001)

==== Prime Ministers ====
Former

- Ciriaco De Mita, 47th Prime Minister of Italy (IP) (1988–1989)
- Romano Prodi, 52nd Prime Minister of Italy (PD) (1996–1998; 2006–2008)

==== Ministers ====
Former

- Emma Bonino, Minister of Foreign Affairs (+E) (2013–2014)
- Renato Brunetta, Minister of Public Administration and Innovation (FI) (2008–2011)
- Carlo Calenda, Minister of Economic Development (A) (2016–2018)
- Giuseppe Fioroni, Minister of Public Education (PD) (2006–2008)
- Gianfranco Rotondi, Minister for the Implementation of the Government Program (FI) (2008–2011)
- Walter Veltroni, Minister for Cultural Heritage (PD) (1996–1998)

=== Members of local governments ===
==== Presidents of Regions ====
- Vincenzo De Luca, President of Campania (PD) (2015–today)
- Vito Bardi, President of Basilicata (FI) (2019–today)
- Attilio Fontana, President of Lombardy (Lega) (2018–today)

Former

- Marcello Pittella, President of Basilicata (PD) (2013–2019)

==== Mayors of main cities ====
- Luigi De Magistris, Mayor of Naples
- Giorgio Gori, Mayor of Bergamo (PD)

=== Members of the Parliament ===
==== Members of the Chamber of Deputies ====
Current

- Simone Baldelli (FI)
- Deborah Bergamini (FI)
- Claudio Borghi (Lega)
- Elena Bruno Bossio (PD)
- Andrea Colletti (M5S)
- Nicola Fratoianni (SI)
- Alessandro Fusacchia (Independent)
- Roberto Giachetti (IV)
- Giancarlo Giorgetti (Lega)
- Mara Lapia (M5S)
- Lucio Malan (FI)
- Riccardo Magi (+E)
- Giorgio Mulé (FI)
- Osvaldo Napoli (FI)
- Matteo Orfini (PD)
- Guido Germano Pettarin (FI)
- Francesco Paolo Sisto (FI)
- Elisa Siragusa (M5S)
- Andrea Vallascas (M5S)
- Pierangelo Zanettin (FI)

Former

- Guido Crosetto (FdI)
- Gianni Cuperlo (PD)
- Andrea Mazziotti di Celso (A)
- Nicola Savino (PSI)

==== Members of the Senate of the Republic ====
- Andrea Cangini (FI)
- Giuseppe Luigi Cucca (IV)
- Saverio De Bonis (Independent)
- Gregorio de Falco (Independent)
- Luigi Di Marzio (Independent)
- Elena Fattori (Independent)
- Tommaso Nannicini (PD)
- Nazario Pagano (FI)
- Marco Perosino (FI)
- Tatjana Rojc (PD)

Former

- Giorgio Tonini (PD)

=== International figures ===
==== Members of the European Parliament ====
- Brando Benifei (PD)
- Sandro Gozi (IV)

=== Notable individuals ===
==== Journalists, commentators, and political satirists ====
- Pierluigi Battista
- Stefano Feltri

==== University and academic figures ====
- Alfonso Celotto, constitutional law professor at the Sapienza University of Rome
- Francesco Clemente, public comparative law professor at the University of Perugia
- Massimo Luciani, constitutional law professor at the Sapienza University of Rome
- Vincenzo Musacchio, jurist
- Marco Plutino, constitutional law professor at the University of Cassino
- Tomaso Montanari
- Massimo Villone, constitutional law professor at the University of Naples Federico II

==== Constitutional judges and lawyers ====
- Sabino Cassese, former judge of the Constitutional Court of Italy
- Giuseppe Tesauro, former President of the Constitutional Court of Italy

==== Others ====
- Marco Bentivogli, former secretary of the Italian Federation of Metal Mechanics (2014–2020)
- Sardines movement

=== Celebrities ===
==== Actors and film directors ====
- Massimo Ghini
- Cristina Comencini
- Sabina Guzzanti
- Gene Gnocchi
- Sabrina Ferilli
- Paolo Virzì
- Ivano Marescotti
- Luca Bizzarri

==== Singers and producers ====
- Roberto Vecchioni

==== Writers and artists ====
- Roberto Saviano
- Sandro Veronesi
- Michela Murgia
- Oliviero Toscani
- Makkox

==== Athletes ====
- Alessandro Costacurta

=== Organisations ===
==== Committees ====
Logo	Campaign	Slogan	Spokesperson	Website
	(N)Ours!	NOstra!	Jacopo Ricci	www.comitatonostra.it
	We NO	Noi NO	Andrea Pruiti Ciarello	noino.eu
	Democrats for the No	Democratici per il No	Giovanni Lattanzi	democraticiperilno.it
	Solidary Network in defense of the Constitution	Rete Solidale in difesa della Costituzione	Marina Calamo Specchia	—N/a
	Popular Committee for the No to the parliamentary cut	Comitato popolare per il No al taglio dei parlamentari	Piero Pirovano	iovotono.eu
	3 Reasons for the No	3 motivi per il No	Stefano D'Andrea	3-motivi-per-il-no0.webnode.it
	Committee for the NO on changes to the Constitution to reduce the number of parliamentarians	Comitato per il NO sulle modifiche alla Costituzione per la riduzione del numero dei Parlamentari	Massimo Villone	coordinamentodemocraziacostituzionale.it noaltagliodelparlamento.it
	Committee for the NO to the Counter-reform	Comitato per il No alla Controriforma	Massimiliano Iervolino	radicali.it/campagne/no-alla-controriforma/
	LET'S START WITH NO – Committee for the NO to the referendum on the cut of parliamentarians	COMINCIAMO DAL NO – Comitato per il NO al referendum sul taglio dei parlamentari	Simona Viola	piueuropa.eu/2020/02/22/comitatodelno/

==== Main political parties ====
Parties	Political orientation	Leader	Ref
Action (Azione)	Social liberalism	Carlo Calenda	
Italian Left (SI)	Democratic socialism	Nicola Fratoianni	
More Europe (+Eu)	Liberalism	Benedetto Della Vedova	
Federation of the Greens (FdV)	Green politics	collective leadership	
Italia in Comune (IiC)	Progressivism	Federico Pizzarotti	
Power to the People (PaP)	Communism	Viola Carofalo	
Italian Socialist Party (PSI)	Social democracy	Enzo Maraio	
Associative Movement Italians Abroad (MAIE)	Italians abroad's interests	Ricardo Antonio Merlo	
South American Union Italian Emigrants (USEI)	Italians abroad's interests	Eugenio Sangregorio	
Communist Refoundation Party (PRC)	Communism	Maurizio Acerbo	

==== Minor parties ====
Parties	Political orientation	Leader	Ref
Energies for Italy (EpI)	Liberalism	Stefano Parisi	
Volt Italia	Pro-Europeanism	Federica Vinci	
Liberal Democratic Alliance for Italy	Classic liberalism	Franco Turco	
Democratic Centre (CD)	Christian left	Bruno Tabacci	
Christian Democracy (DC)	Christian democracy	Renato Grassi	
Italian Communist Party (PCI)	Communism	Mauro Alboresi	
Pact for Autonomy (PpA)	Autonomism	Massimo Moretuzzo	
The People of the Family (PdF)	Social conservatism	Mario Adinolfi	
Workers' Communist Party (PCL)	Communism	Marco Ferrando	
Italian Marxist–Leninist Party (PMLI)	Maoism	Giovanni Scuderi	

==== Newspapers ====
Newspapers	Political and cultural orientation
la Repubblica	Centrism, Liberalism
La Stampa	Social liberalism
il manifesto	Communism
Domani	Social democracy, Cultural liberalism
HuffPost Italia	Centrism
Il Riformista	Liberalism, Reformism
Linkiesta	Centrism, Liberalism
Avanti!	Social democracy (official newspaper of the Italian Socialist Party)

==== Periodicals ====
Periodicals	Political and cultural orientation
L'Espresso	Progressivism
Left	Democratic socialism

==== Other organisations ====
Organisations	Political and cultural orientation	Leaders
Fondazione Luigi Einaudi (FLE)		Giuseppe Benedetto
Consiglio Generale degli Italiani all’Estero (CGIE)		Michele Schiavone
National Association of the Italian Partisans (ANPI)	Anti-fascism	Carla Nespolo
Italian Ricreative and Cultural Association (ARCI)	Non-profit association	Francesca Chiavacci
Freedom and Justice (LeG)	Non-profit association	Paul Ginsborg

== Officially endorse neither side ==
=== Notable individuals ===
==== Constitutional judges and lawyer ====
- Gustavo Zagrebelsky, former President of the Constitutional Court of Italy

=== Organisations ===
==== Main political parties ====
Parties	Political orientation	Leader	Ref
Italia Viva (IV)	Liberalism	Matteo Renzi	
