= Veneto 2 (Chamber of Deputies constituency) =

- Chamber of Deputies; Electoral constituency
- Region: Veneto
- Electorate: 2,241,715 (2018)
- Major settlements: Padova, Rovigo, Verona, Vicenza

Current constituency
- Created: 1993
- Seats: 30

Veneto 2 is one of the 29 constituencies (Italian: circoscrizioni) represented in the Chamber of Deputies, the lower house of the Italian parliament. The constituency currently elects 30 deputies. Its boundaries correspond to those of the provinces of Padova, Rovigo, Verona and Vicenza, within the Veneto region. The electoral system uses a parallel voting system, which act as a mixed system, with 37% of seats allocated using a first-past-the-post electoral system and 61% using a proportional method, with one round of voting.

The constituency was first established by the Mattarella law on 4 August 1993 and later confirmed by the Calderoli law on 21 December 2005 and by the Rosato law on 3 November 2017.

== Electoral results ==
=== 2018 ===
==== General results (Proportional+FPTP) ====
Coalition	Party	Votes	%	Seats	
Coalition	Party	Votes	%	Prop.	FPTP
Centre-right	League	561 962	32.39	7	
Centre-right	Forza Italia	184 711	10.65	2	
Centre-right	Brothers of Italy	78 214	4.51	1	
Centre-right	Us with Italy-UDC	24 736	1.43	-	
Centre-right	Total (coalition)	849 623	48.97	10	11
Five Star Movement		415 022	23.92	5	-
Centre-left	Democratic Party	280 657	16.18	4	
Centre-left	More Europe	46 323	2.67	-	
Centre-left	Popular Civic List	7 909	0.46	-	
Centre-left	Together	7 503	0.43	-	
Centre-left	Total (coalition)	342 392	19.73	4	-
Free and Equal		44 661	2.57	-	-
The People of the Family		19 790	1.14	-	-
CasaPound		19 613	1.13	-	-
Others		43 953	2.54	-	-
Total		1 735 054	100.00	19	11

==== First-past-the-post results ====
Elected in the centre-right coalition

Uninominal district	Elected	Party
1. Rovigo	Antonietta Giacometti	LV
2. Padua	Arianna Lazzarini	LV
3. Vigonza	Alberto Stefani	LV
4. Abano Terme	Lorena Milanato	FI
5. Vicenza	Pierantonio Zanettin	FI
6. Bassano del Grappa	Germano Racchella	LV
7. Schio	Maria Cristina Caretta	FdI
8. San Bonifacio	Paolo Paternoster	LV
9. Verona	Vito Comencini	LV
10. Legnago	Piergiorgio Cortelazzo	FI
11. Villafranca di Verona	Davide Bendinelli	FI

==== Proportional results ====
Plurinominal district	League	Five Star Movement	Democratic Party	Forza Italia	Brothers of Italy
Veneto 2 - 01	Massimo Bitonci; Adolfo Zordan	Silvia Benedetti; Raphael Raduzzi	Alessandro Zan	Roberto Caon	-
Veneto 2 - 02	Silvia Covolo; Erik Umberto Pretto	Sara Cunial	Lucia Annibali	-	-
Veneto 2 - 03	Lorenzo Fontana; Vania Valbusa; Roberto Turri	Francesca Businarolo; Mattia Fantinati	Gian Pietro Dal Moro; Diego Zardini	Marco Marin	Cirio Maschio
