= Lucia Ciampi =

Italian politician

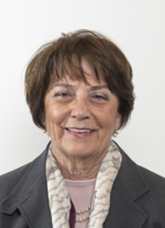
- Lucia Ciampi in 2018

Member of the Chamber of Deputies
- In office 23 March 2018 – 13 October 2022
- Constituency: Tuscany

Mayor of Calcinaia
- In office 8 June 2009 – 26 May 2019
- Preceded by: Marta Perini
- Succeeded by: Cristiano Alderigi

Personal details
- Born: 7 January 1950 (age 76) Calcinaia, Italy
- Party: Democratic Party (since 2007)
- Other political affiliations: DS (1998-2007); PDS (1991-1998); PCI (until 1991)
- Education: University of Pisa

Lucia Ciampi (born 7 January 1950) is an Italian politician. She served in the Italian Chamber of Deputies from 2018 to 2022.

== Biography ==
After graduating from the "Andrea da Pontedera" high school with a classical high school diploma, she graduated in philosophy from the University of Pisa. She then taught history and philosophy for many years at the "XXV Aprile" scientific high school in Pontedera, until her retirement in 2016. She has two sons, Francesco and Matteo.

She was a municipal councilor in Calcinaia between 1980 and 1984 with the PCI, then holding the role of Deputy Mayor with responsibility for Culture and Public Education between 1995 and 1999. Since 1999 she has been actively involved in the trade union, serving on the provincial board of the FLC CGIL Scuola of Pisa.

In January 2009 she won the PD primaries in Calcinaia against the outgoing mayor Marta Perini and in the following June she was elected mayor of Calcinaia. She was re-elected as mayor in the 2014 Italian local elections. A few months later she also became councillor for the Province of Pisa. In June 2017 she was appointed President of the Union of Municipalities of Valdera.

In the 2018 Italian general election, she ran for the Chamber of Deputies for the Centre-left coalition but was defeated by the Lega Nord's Edoardo Ziello in the single-member constituency of Pisa. She was nevertheless elected for the Democratic Party in the proportional quota, obtaining a seat in the multi-member constituency of Tuscany. Her parliamentary mandate ended at the end of the XVIII legislature in autumn 2022 with the calling of the 2022 general election.

== See also ==
- List of members of the Chamber of Deputies of Italy, 2018–2022
