= Sicily 1 (Chamber of Deputies constituency) =

- Chamber of Deputies; Electoral constituency
- Region: Sicily
- Electorate: 1,896,537 (2018)
- Major settlements: Agrigento, Caltanissetta, Palermo, Trapani

Current constituency
- Created: 1993
- Seats: 25
- Members: M5S (17); FI (3); PD (2); Lega (2); FdI (1); LeU (1)

Sicily 1 is one of the 29 constituencies (Italian: circoscrizioni) represented in the Chamber of Deputies, the lower house of the Italian parliament. The constituency currently elects 25 deputies. Its boundaries correspond to those of the Metropolitan City of Palermo and the provinces of Agrigento, Caltanissetta and Trapani, within the Sicily region. The electoral system uses a parallel voting system, which act as a mixed system, with 37% of seats allocated using a first-past-the-post electoral system and 61% using a proportional method, with one round of voting.

The constituency was first established by the Mattarella law on 4 August 1993 and later confirmed by the Calderoli law on 21 December 2005 and by the Rosato law on 3 November 2017.

== Members of the Parliament ==
=== 2018–present ===
Single-member districts
District			Deputy	Party
N.	Name	Map	Deputy	Party
01	Palermo–Resuttana–San Lorenzo		Aldo Penna	Five Star Movement
02	Palermo–Libertà		Giorgio Trizzino	Five Star Movement
03	Palermo–Settecannoli		Roberta Alaimo	Five Star Movement
04	Gela		Dedalo Pignatone	Five Star Movement
05	Bagheria		Vittoria Casa	Five Star Movement
06	Monreale		Giuseppe Chiazzese	Five Star Movement
07	Agrigento		Michele Sodano	Five Star Movement
08	Marsala		Piera Aiello	Five Star Movement
09	Mazara del Vallo		Vita Martinciglio	Five Star Movement

Multi-member districts
District			Party	Deputy
N.	Name	Map	Party	Deputy
01	Sicily 1 – 01		Five Star Movement	Adriano Varrica
01	Sicily 1 – 01		Five Star Movement	Valentina D'Orso
01	Sicily 1 – 01		Forza Italia	Francesco Scoma
01	Sicily 1 – 01		Free and Equal	Erasmo Palazzotto
02	Sicily 1 – 02		Five Star Movement	Antonio Lombardo
02	Sicily 1 – 02		Five Star Movement	Caterina Licatini
02	Sicily 1 – 02		Five Star Movement	Davide Aiello
02	Sicily 1 – 02		Forza Italia	Matilde Siracusano
02	Sicily 1 – 02		Democratic Party	Carmelo Miceli
03	Sicily 1 – 03		Five Star Movement	Azzurra Cancelleri
03	Sicily 1 – 03		Five Star Movement	Filippo Giuseppe Perconti
03	Sicily 1 – 03		Five Star Movement	Rosalba Cimino
03	Sicily 1 – 03		Forza Italia	Giusi Bartolozzi
03	Sicily 1 – 03		Democratic Party	Daniela Cardinale
03	Sicily 1 – 03		League	Alessandro Pagano
03	Sicily 1 – 03		Brothers of Italy	Carolina Varchi
