= Alessandro Amitrano =

Italian politician

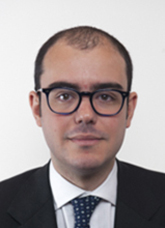

Secretary of the Chamber of Deputies
- In office June 26, 2018 – October 12, 2022
- President: Roberto Fico

Deputy of the Italian Republic
- In office March 23, 2018 – October 12, 2022

Personal details
- Born: July 7, 1989 (age 36) Naples, Italy
- Party: Independent (from 2022); M5S (2010–2022); IpF
- Occupation: Politician

Alessandro Amitrano (July 7, 1989, Naples, Italy) is an Italian politician who served as a member of the Chamber of Deputies during the 18th legislature of the Italian Republic. During his tenure, he held the position of secretary within the Chamber of Deputies. He was initially elected as a member of the 5 Star Movement and later joined the Together for the Future party in 2022 after Luigi Di Maio's split.

== Biography ==
Born in Naples on July 7, 1989, he began his career as a journalist. He became associated with the 5 Star Movement (M5S) in 2009, initially as a student representative. His involvement with M5S deepened in 2010 during the run-up to the 2010 regional elections in Campania. At that time, Roberto Fico, the candidate for the regional presidency, responded positively to Amitrano's appeal, made through his association, to engage in discussions and assessments of ideas and issues. Consequently, in 2010, Amitrano became a full-fledged member of M5S.

In the 2015 Campania regional elections, he ran with the 5-Star Movement for Campania's regional council, in Valeria Ciarambino's motion, but receiving only 518 preferences in the Naples constituency and being unelected.

In the 2018 general elections, he was a candidate for the Chamber of Deputies, among the M5S lists in the plurinominal constituency 03 of the Campania 1 constituency, being elected deputy. During the 18th legislative session of the Republic, he served as the secretary of the Chamber of Deputies' Bureau, making him the youngest individual ever to occupy this role. He assumed this position after replacing his party colleague Carlo Sibilia, who had been newly appointed as the Undersecretary of the Interior. In addition to his role as secretary, he was a member of the 11th Committee on Public and Private Labor, the Committee for the Oversight of Documentation Activities, and the Elections Council.

June 21, 2022 follows Luigi Di Maio's split from the 5 Star Movement, following disagreements between him and M5S President Giuseppe Conte, to join Together for the Future(Ipf).

In the early parliamentary elections held on September 25, 2022, he was re-nominated as a candidate for the Chamber of Deputies under the electoral list of Ipf Civic Commitment-Democratic Centre (IC-CD). He ran in the multi-member constituencies of Basilicata – 01 and Campania 1 – 01, occupying the third position, and in Molise – 01, where he held the second position. However, he did not secure election due to the poor national performance of IC-CD.

== See also ==
- List of members of the Italian Chamber of Deputies, 2018–2022
- Legislature XVIII of Italy
- Five Star Movement
