= Federica Daga =

Italian politician

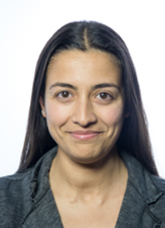

Secretary of the Chamber of Deputies
- In office June 26, 2018 – October 12, 2022
- President: Roberto Fico

Member of Parliament of the Italian Republic
- In office March 15, 2013 – October 12, 2022

Personal details
- Born: February 28, 1976 (age 50) Oristano, Italy
- Party: M5S (until 2022); IpF (2022)
- Occupation: Politician

Federica Daga (born February 28, 1976, in Oristano, Italy) is an Italian politician. She served as a member of the Chamber of Deputies during the 17th and 18th legislatures of the Italian Republic. Initially elected as a representative of the 5 Star Movement, she later joined the Together for the Future party in 2022 following Luigi Di Maio's split.

== Biography ==
Originally from Oristano, Sardinia, she relocated to Turin, where she pursued a career in information technology. There, she spent a decade as an IT consultant before eventually making Rome her permanent residence.

An activist long engaged in frontline efforts for public water access and against the Turin-Lyon TAV project, she joined the committee in Turin. She also became a member of the Meetup Amici di Beppe Grillo in Turin, showing interest in issues related to conscious and sustainable consumption, self-production, and bartering.

In the 2010 Piedmont regional elections, she ran for office with the Five Star Movement (M5S) in the Turin constituency, in Davide Bono's motion. However, she was not elected, obtaining only 307 preferences.

In 2011 she became committed to the public water repeal referendum, becoming a point of reference for water movements throughout Italy.

=== Political career ===
Ahead of the 2013 general elections, she participated in the "Parlamentarie" of the 5 Stars (online consultation for parliamentary candidacies), where she was selected to be a candidate with 390 votes. In the 2013 political elections, she was nominated for the Chamber of Deputies, among the lists of M5S in the Lazio 1 constituency as the leading candidate, and elected as deputy. Before entering parliament, she claimed to vote for Rifondazione and that she had to choose another symbol was No TAV. In the 17th Legislature of the Republic, she was a member and group leader for M5S in the 8th Committee on Environment, Territory and Public Works.

In the 2018 general elections, she was re-elected as a candidate for the House among the M5S lists in the same constituency, being re-elected as an MP. During the 18th legislative term, she held the position of secretary in the House Bureau and served as a member of both the Advisory Committee on the Conduct of Members and the 8th Committee on the Environment, Territory, and Public Works. Furthermore, she was actively involved in advocating for public water issues, sponsoring a bill under her own name on this topic.

On June 21, 2022, she followed Luigi Di Maio's split from the 5 Star Movement due to disagreements between him and the President of the M5S, Giuseppe Conte. She joined the "Together for the Future" (Ipf) party.

In the early parliamentary elections held on September 25, 2022, she was nominated as a candidate for the Chamber of Deputies on the electoral list of Ipf Civic Commitment-Democratic Centre (IC-CD). She ran in several multi-member constituencies, including Tuscany – 03 and Lazio 1 – 02 in the second position, and in Abruzzo – 01, Lazio 1 – 01, and Lazio 2 – 01 in the fourth position. However, she was not elected due to the poor national performance of IC-CD.

== See also ==
- Five Star Movement
- Together for the Future
- Legislature XVII of Italy
- Legislature XVIII of Italy
- List of members of the Italian Chamber of Deputies, 2018–2022
- 2013 Italian general election
- 2018 Italian general election
