= Azzurra Cancelleri =

Italian politician

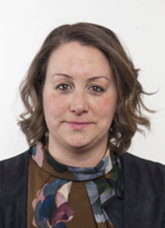

Secretary of the Chamber of Deputies
- In office March 29, 2018 – October 12, 2022
- President: Roberto Fico

Member of Parliament of the Italian Republic
- In office March 15, 2013 – October 12, 2022

Personal details
- Born: Azzurra Pia Maria Cancelleri; May 5, 1984 (age 41) Caltanissetta, Italy
- Party: Five Star Movement
- Occupation: Politician

Azzurra Pia Maria Cancelleri (born May 5, 1984, Caltanissetta, Italy) is an Italian politician, a member of the Chamber of Deputies for the Five Star Movement from 2013 to 2022.

== Biography ==
In 2013 general elections, she participated in the 5 Stars' "Parlamentarie" (online consultation for parliamentary candidacies) in December 2012, where she obtained 63 preferences and turned out seventh in constituency Sicily 1. Candidate for the 2013 political elections to the Chamber of Deputies, placed in fifth position for the constituency Sicily 1 among the lists of the 5 Stars Movement, she is elected deputy.

In the XVII Legislature of the Republic, she held the position of secretary for the Five Star parliamentary group and served as the secretary of the Finance Committee from May 7, 2013, to April 30, 2015. Additionally, she was a member of the Productive Activities, Trade, and Tourism Committee, as well as the Parliamentary Committee on Regional Issues.

In the March 4, 2018 general elections, she was re-elected for the second time as an MP, in the same constituency among the proportional lists of the Five Star Movement.

On March 29, 2018, she was elected secretary of the Chamber of Deputies with 217 votes.

== See also ==
- Legislature XVII of Italy
- Legislature XVIII of Italy
- List of members of the Italian Chamber of Deputies, 2018–2022
- Five Star Movement
