= Luigi Iovino =

Italian politician

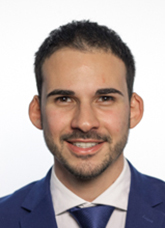

Secretary of the Chamber of Deputies
- In office October 2, 2019 – October 12, 2022
- President: Roberto Fico

Deputy of the Italian Republic
- In office March 23, 2018 – October 12, 2022

Personal details
- Born: January 14, 1993 (age 33) Naples, Italy

Luigi Iovino (January 14, 1993, Naples, Italy) is an Italian politician, a member of the Italian Chamber of Deputies in the XVIII legislature of the Italian Republic. He served as the Secretary of the Presidency Office of the Chamber of Deputies from October 2, 2019, to October 12, 2022, making him the youngest in the history of the Italian Republic.

== Biography ==
In 2015, he ran for the University of Salerno Student Council, where he was elected and later also became the Vice President of the University Student Council. Subsequently, he joined the Five Star Movement, thanks to his father, who had already informed him in 2013 that Beppe Grillo was looking for list representatives. In the same year, he ran for the municipal elections in Campania as the mayor of San Paolo Bel Sito with the Five Star Movement.

He won the internal primaries within the Five Star Movement and was nominated on the M5S list for the political elections in March 2018. He was elected as a Deputy in the XVIII legislature of the Italian Republic with the Five Star Movement and is one of the youngest parliamentarians of the legislature, having just turned 25 in time for the candidacy.

On October 2, 2019, he was elected as the Secretary of the Presidency Office of the Chamber of Deputies with 243 votes out of 268 during the proceedings in the Chamber. He became the youngest Secretary of the Presidency of the Chamber of Deputies in the history of the Italian Republic.

In 2020, he ran for and was elected as the Regional Facilitator in Campania for Internal Relations within the Five Star Movement, receiving the highest number of votes nationally with 969 preferences.

Considered one of Luigi Di Maio's closest associates, on June 21, 2022, he followed Di Maio in his split from the Five Star Movement, as a result of disagreements between Di Maio and the President of the M5S, Giuseppe Conte, to join Together for the Future (Ipf).

== Scandals ==
In 2025, Mr. Iovino gained media attention after a video of him yelling back at a university professor went viral online.

== See also ==
- List of members of the Italian Chamber of Deputies, 2018–2022
- Legislature XVIII of Italy
- Five Star Movement
- Together for the Future
