= Carmela Grippa =

Italian politician

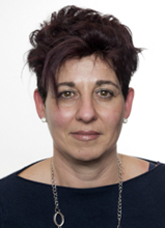

Member of the Parliament of Italy
- In office 23 March 2018 – 12 October 2022
- Parliamentary group: Five Star Movement
- Constituency: Abruzzo

Personal details
- Born: 18 January 1973 (age 53) Lucera
- Occupation: Politician

Carmela Grippa is an Italian politician. She was elected to be a deputy to the Parliament of Italy in the 2018 Italian general election for the Legislature XVIII of Italy.

== Career ==
Grippa was born on 18 January 1973 in Lucera.

She was elected to the Italian Parliament in the 2018 Italian general election, to represent the district of Abruzzo for Five Star Movement.
