= Celeste D'Arrando =

Italian politician

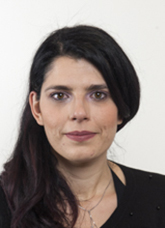

Member of the Parliament of Italy
- Incumbent
- Assumed office March 19, 2018
- Parliamentary group: Five Star Movement
- Constituency: Piedmont 1

Personal details
- Born: March 23, 1985 (age 41) Turin, Italy
- Occupation: Politician

Celeste D'Arrando (born March 23, 1985, in Turin, Italy) is an Italian politician. She was elected to be a deputy to the Parliament of Italy in the 2018 Italian general election for the Legislature XVIII of Italy.

== Career ==
D'Arrando was born on March 23, 1985, in Turin.

She was elected to the Italian Parliament in the 2018 Italian general election, to represent the district of Piedmont 1 for the Five Star Movement.
