= Ciro Maschio =

Italian politician (born 1971)

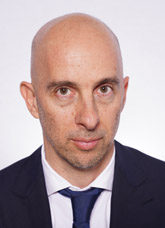
- Maschio in 2022

Member of the Chamber of Deputies
- Incumbent
- Assumed office 18 October 2022
- Constituency: Veneto 2

Personal details
- Born: 23 July 1971 (age 55)
- Party: Brothers of Italy

Ciro Maschio (born 23 July 1971), is an Italian politician of Brothers of Italy serving as member of the Chamber of Deputies. He was first elected in the 2018 general election, and was re-elected in 2022. Since 2022, he has chaired the Justice Committee.

== Biography ==
Born in Negrar di Valpolicella, in the province of Verona, he earned a law degree and works as a lawyer. From a young age, he was active in the Italian Social Movement and became provincial secretary of its youth organization, the Youth Front. Since 1995, he has been a member of the National Alliance (Italy), where he served on the executive committee of Azione Giovani.

In the 1994 local elections, he was elected vice president of Verona 2nd municipal district, while in the 1998 local elections he ran for Verona City Council on the National Alliance (Italy) ticket in support of the center-right Forza Italia mayoral candidate Michela Sironi, and was elected city councilor.

In the 2007 elections, he returned to the city council as part of a civic list supporting Flavio Tosi. In 2009, he joined the The People of Freedom party along with his own party. In 2012, he was re-elected on the Tosi for Verona list.

In 2013, he joined Brothers of Italy (FdI), where, in addition to running unsuccessfully as a candidate for the Chamber of Deputies in the Veneto 1 constituency on the party’s list in that year’s general election, he served as regional coordinator for Veneto during the party’s early years, and later as provincial coordinator in Verona.

In the 2015 regional elections in Veneto, he ran on the Brothers of Italy ticket as part of the motion put forward by outgoing Lega Nord President Luca Zaia; with 1,031 votes, he finished first in the Province of Verona district but was not elected.

In the 2017 local elections, he ran again for Verona City Council on the Brothers of Italy ticket in support of center-right mayoral candidate Federico Sboarina; he was re-elected to the City Council and became its president.

In the 2018 general election, he ran for the Chamber of Deputies (Italy) on the Fratelli d'Italia party list in the Veneto 2 - 03 multi-member constituency and was elected as a deputy. During the 18th Legislature of the Republic, he served as secretary, FdI group leader, and vice-chair of the Elections Committee in the Chamber of Deputies, in addition to serving on the Second Justice Committee and the Committee on Incompatibilities, Ineligibility, and Forfeiture of Office, and introducing 161 bills.

In the 2022 early general election, he ran again for the Chamber of Deputies in the single-member constituency of Veneto 2 - 07 (Villafranca di Verona), backed by the center-right coalition[8], as well as serving as the lead candidate for Brothers of Italy in the corresponding multi-member constituency; He was re-elected in the single-member district with 64.42% of the vote, clearly outperforming the center-left’s leading candidate, Federica Foglia (16.97%), by more than three times. In the 19th legislature, he served as chairman of the Chamber of Deputies’ 2nd Justice Committee.
