= Carmela Bucalo =

Italian politician

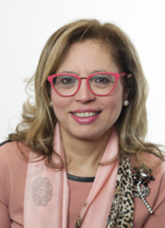

Member of the Parliament of Italy
- Incumbent
- Assumed office 19 March 2018
- Parliamentary group: Brothers of Italy
- Constituency: Sicily 2

Personal details
- Born: 27 June 1963 (age 62)
- Occupation: Politician

Carmela Bucalo is an Italian politician. She was elected to be a deputy to the Parliament of Italy in the 2018 Italian general election for the Legislature XVIII of Italy.

== Career ==
Bucalo was born on 27 June 1963 in Barcellona Pozzo di Gotto.

She was elected to the Italian Parliament in the 2018 Italian general election, to represent the district of Sicily 2 for the Brothers of Italy.
