= Rosalba De Giorgi =

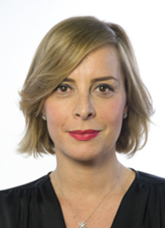
- Rosalba De Giorgi in 2018

Member of the Chamber of Deputies
- In office 23 March 2018 – 13 October 2022
- Constituency: 10 (Taranto)

Personal details
- Born: 1 May 1970 (age 56) Milan, Italy
- Party: Independent (since 2020)
- Other political affiliations: Five Star Movement (until 2020)

Rosalba De Giorgi (born 1 May 1970) is an Italian politician and journalist. She was a member of the Chamber of Deputies of the Italian Parliament from 2018 to 2022.

== Biography ==
Born in Milan, she has lived in Taranto since the age of 4. She has a teaching diploma, taught in a school in the city and has become a well-known face on a local television station.

A professional journalist, she was elected as a member of the Five Star Movement in the 2018 Italian general election. She has been a member of the 14th Commission for European Union Policies since 2018. In September 2018, she was challenged in Taranto by a group of protesters who were participating in a sit-in to demand the closure of the Ilva plant in Taranto, one of the most polluting factories in Europe. She had to leave under police escort. A video appeal launched from the passenger compartment of her car also caused controversy during the COVID-19 pandemic, in which she invited citizens to "stay at home".

On 6 May 2020, she resigned from the Five Star Movement and joined the Mixed Group. She justified this decision by saying, "I did it for Taranto. On the former Ilva steelworks, the Five Star Movement betrayed my expectations and those of my fellow citizens".

== See also ==
- List of members of the Chamber of Deputies of Italy, 2018–2022
