= Anna Lisa Baroni =

Italian politician (born 1959)

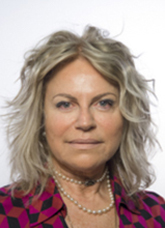

Member of the Parliament of Italy
- Incumbent
- Assumed office March 19, 2018
- Parliamentary group: Forza Italia (until 2022)
- Constituency: Lombardy 4

Personal details
- Born: 20 October 1959 (age 66)
- Occupation: Politician

Anna Lisa Baroni (born 20 October 1959) is an Italian politician. She was elected to be a deputy to the Parliament of Italy in the 2018 Italian general election for the Legislature XVIII of Italy.

== Career ==
Baroni was born on 20 October 1959, in Mantua.

She was elected to the Italian Parliament in the 2018 Italian general election, to represent the district of Lombardy for the Forza Italia party.
