= Angela Ianaro =

Italian politician

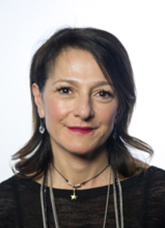

Member of the Parliament of Italy
- In office March 19, 2018 – October 13, 2022
- Parliamentary group: Five Star Movement
- Constituency: Campania 2

Personal details
- Born: August 28, 1967 (age 58) Benevento, Italy
- Occupation: Politician

Angela Ianaro is an Italian politician. She was elected to be a deputy to the Parliament of Italy in the 2018 Italian general election for the Legislature XVIII of Italy.

== Career ==
Ianaro was born on August 28, 1967, in Benevento.

She was elected to the Italian Parliament in the 2018 Italian general election, representing the Five Star Movement.
