= Veneto 1 (Chamber of Deputies constituency) =

- Chamber of Deputies; Electoral constituency
- Region: Veneto
- Electorate: 1,485,726 (2018)
- Major settlements: Belluno, Treviso, Venice

Current constituency
- Created: 1993
- Seats: 20 (1994-2020); 13 (since 2020)

Veneto 1 is one of the 29 constituencies (Italian: circoscrizioni) represented in the Chamber of Deputies, the lower house of the Italian parliament. The constituency currently elects 20 deputies. Its boundaries correspond to those of the Metropolitan City of Venice and the provinces of Belluno and Treviso, within the Veneto region. The electoral system uses a parallel voting system, which act as a mixed system, with 37% of seats allocated using a first-past-the-post electoral system and 61% using a proportional method, with one round of voting.

The constituency was first established by the Mattarella law on 4 August 1993 and later confirmed by the Calderoli law on 21 December 2005 and by the Rosato law on 3 November 2017.

== Electoral results ==
=== 2018 ===
==== General results (Proportional+FPTP) ====
| Coalition | Party | Votes | % | Seats | |
| Coalition | Party | Votes | % | Prop. | FPTP |
|---|---|---|---|---|---|
| Centre-right | League | 358 435 | 31.95 | 4 | |
| Centre-right | Forza Italia | 115 731 | 10.32 | 1 | |
| Centre-right | Brothers of Italy | 41 550 | 3.70 | 1 | |
| Centre-right | Us with Italy–UDC | 8 136 | 0.73 | - | |
| Centre-right | Total (coalition) | 523 852 | 46.70 | 6 | 8 |
| Five Star Movement | | 280 757 | 25.03 | 3 | - |
| Centre-left | Democratic Party | 195 173 | 17.40 | 3 | |
| Centre-left | More Europe | 31 176 | 2.78 | - | |
| Centre-left | Together | 5 777 | 0.51 | - | |
| Centre-left | Popular Civic | 5 433 | 0.48 | - | |
| Centre-left | Total (coalition) | 237 559 | 21.18 | 3 | - |
| Free and Equal | | 32 967 | 2.94 | - | - |
| The People of the Family | | 10 443 | 0.93 | - | - |
| CasaPound | | 8 454 | 0.75 | - | - |
| Power to the People! | | 8 243 | 0.73 | - | - |
| Others | | 19 473 | 1.75 | - | - |
| Total | | 1 121 748 | 100.00 | 12 | 8 |

==== First-past-the-post results ====
| Uninominal district | Elected | Party |
|---|---|---|
| 1. Venice | Giorgia Andreuzza | LSP |
| 2. San Donà di Piave | Renato Brunetta | FI |
| 3. Chioggia | Ketty Fogliani | LSP |
| 4. Castelfranco Veneto | Dimitri Coin | LSP |
| 5. Montebelluna | Ingrid Bisa | LSP |
| 6. Conegliano | Marica Fantuz | LSP |
| 7. Belluno | Mirco Badole | LSP |
| 8. Treviso | Raffaele Baratto | FI |

==== Proportional results ====
| Plurinominal district | League | Five Star Movement | Democratic Party | Forza Italia | Brothers of Italy |
|---|---|---|---|---|---|
| Veneto 1 - 01 | Sergio Vallotto; Alex Bazzaro | ALSPise Maniero; Arianna Spessotto | Sara Moretto; Nicola Pellicani | - | - |
| Veneto 1 - 02 | Angela Colmellere; Franco Manzato | Federico D'Incà | Roger De Menech | Dario Bond | Luca De Carlo |

=== 2022 ===
==== General results (Proportional+FPTP) ====
| Coalition | Party | Votes | % | Seats | |
| Coalition | Party | Votes | % | Prop. | FPTP |
|---|---|---|---|---|---|
| Centre-right | Brothers of Italy | | | | |
| Centre-right | League | | | | |
| Centre-right | Forza Italia | | | | |
| Centre-right | Us Moderates | | | | |
| Centre-right | Total (coalition) | | | | |
| Centre-left | Democratic Party | | | | |
| Centre-left | Greens and Left Alliance | | | | |
| Centre-left | More Europe | | | | |
| Centre-left | Civic Commitment | | | | |
| Centre-left | Total (coalition) | | | | |
| Five Star Movement | | | | | |
| Action/Italia Viva | | | | | |
| Others | | | | | |
| Total | | | | 5 | 3 |
