= Alessia Rotta =

Italian politician

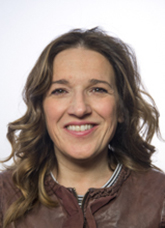
- Rotta in 2018

Member of the Chamber of Deputies (Italy)
- In office 15 March 2013 – 12 October 2022
- Constituency: Veneto 1 (2013); Tuscany - 04 (2018)

Personal details
- Born: September 12, 1975 (age 50) Tregnago, Italy
- Party: Democratic Party
- Other political affiliations: Base Riformista (faction)
- Education: University of Bologna (Degree in Communication Studies)
- Occupation: Politician, Journalist
- Profession: Journalist
- Committees: Committee on Transport, Posts and Telecommunications (XVII Legislature); Committee on Public and Private Employment (XVII Legislature); Committee on EU Policies (XVIII Legislature); Committee on Finance (substitute); Committee on Environment, Territory and Public Works (Chair, from 2020)

Alessia Rotta (born 12 September 1975 in Tregnago) is an Italian politician who served as a member of the Chamber of Deputies from 15 March 2013 to 12 October 2022, representing the Democratic Party.

== Early life and education ==
Rotta was born in Tregnago and spent her early years in Sommacampagna, in the province of Verona. After graduating from the Scipione Maffei State Classical High School in Verona, she earned a degree in communication studies from the University of Bologna, with a thesis titled "The Periphery in French Cinema," supervised by Umberto Eco.

== Career ==
=== Journalism ===
Since 2004, she has worked as a journalist for the Verona-based TV station Tele Arena. In 2006, she joined the Order of Journalists, became a member of the editorial board in 2012, and served as a union representative.

=== Political career ===
==== Election to the Chamber of Deputies ====
In December 2012, Rotta participated in the Democratic Party's parliamentary primaries ahead of the 2013 general election, receiving 2,409 votes, the highest number for a female candidate in Verona. She was subsequently elected to the Chamber of Deputies in the Veneto 1 constituency, placed 13th on the Democratic Party list. During the 17th legislature, she was a member of the 9th Committee on Transport, Posts and Telecommunications and the 11th Committee on Public and Private Employment.

==== Role in party communications ====
During the 2013 Democratic Party leadership primaries, she supported the motion of Matteo Renzi, then mayor of Florence, who won with 67.55% of the vote. Rotta joined the party's National Directorate following his victory. On 16 September 2014, Renzi appointed her Head of Communications in the party's national secretariat.

She supported Renzi again in the 2017 leadership primaries, serving on the national coordination team for his campaign, which won nearly 70% of the vote. She remained a member of the National Directorate but was not reappointed to the national secretariat.

==== Re-election and parliamentary roles ====
In the 2018 general election, Rotta was a candidate for the Democratic Party in both the single-member district Veneto 2 - 09 (Verona), where she received 25.62% of the vote and lost to center-right candidate Vito Comencini (Lega), and the multi-member district Tuscany - 04, where she was elected. During the 18th legislature, she served as deputy group leader of the Democratic Party in the Chamber from 18 April 2018 to 8 April 2021. She was a member of the 14th Committee on EU Policies, the 6th Committee on Finance (substituting for undersecretary Roberto Morassut), and served as President of the 8th Committee on Environment, Territory and Public Works from 29 July 2020.

In the 2019 Democratic Party primaries, she supported the candidacy of former agriculture minister Maurizio Martina, who represented the Renzi-aligned wing of the party and finished second with 22% of the vote, behind Nicola Zingaretti (66%). Rotta subsequently joined the centrist reformist faction "Base Riformista," led by Lorenzo Guerini and Luca Lotti.
