= Giovanni Luca Aresta =

Italian politician and lawyer

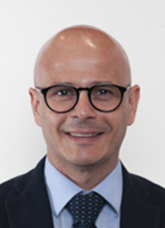

Deputy of the Italian Republic
- In office March 23, 2018 – October 12, 2022

Personal details
- Born: April 24, 1973 (age 52) Mesagne, Italy
- Party: Independent (from 2022); M5S (2018–2022); IpF (2022)
- Occupation: Politician, lawyer

Giovanni Luca Aresta (born April 24, 1973, in Mesagne, Italy) is an Italian politician. He served as a member of the Chamber of Deputies during the 18th legislature of the Italian Republic. Initially elected as a representative of the 5 Star Movement, he later joined the Together for the Future party in 2022 following Luigi Di Maio's split.

== Biography ==
Born in Mesagne, in the province of Brindisi, and working as a criminal lawyer, during the 2018 Italian general elections, Giovanni Luca Aresta was nominated as a candidate for the Chamber of Deputies in the single-member constituency of Puglia - 12 (Francavilla Fontana). He was supported by the Five Star Movement (M5S) and was elected as a deputy with 47.43% of the votes, defeating the center-right candidate Antonio Andrisano (33.21%) and the center-left candidate Elisa Mariano, who was representing the Democratic Party (13.28%). In the 18th legislature of the Italian Republic, he served as a member and later as the leader of the M5S and then Ipf (Together for the Future) in the 4th Defense Committee. He was also a member of the Legislative Committee and the Parliamentary Commission of Inquiry into the death of Giulio Regeni.

On June 21, 2022, he followed Luigi Di Maio in splitting from the Five Star Movement (M5S) due to disagreements between Di Maio and the M5S president, Giuseppe Conte. He then joined "Together for the Future" (Ipf).

He did not run for parliament again in the 2022 early general election.

Since June 2023, he has been the CEO of Santa Teresa S.p.A. – an in-house service provider for the province of Brindisi.
