= Ylenja Lucaselli =

Italian politician

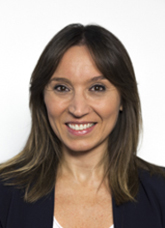

Member of the Chamber of Deputies
- Incumbent
- Assumed office 23 March 2018
- Constituency: Emilia-Romagna

Personal details
- Born: 22 April 1976 (age 50) Taranto, Italy
- Party: Brothers of Italy
- Education: University of Modena and Reggio Emilia
- Occupation: Politician; Lawyer

Ylenja Lucaselli (born 22 April 1976) is an Italian politician and lawyer. She was elected to be a deputy to the Parliament of Italy in the 2018 Italian general election for the Legislature XVIII of Italy.

== Career ==
She attended the University of Modena and Reggio Emilia.

She was elected to the Italian Parliament in the 2018 Italian general election, to represent the district of Emilia-Romagna for the Brothers of Italy.
