= Ingrid Bisa =

Italian politician (born 1978)

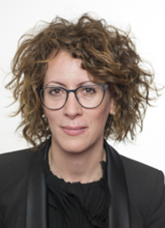

Member of the Parliament of Italy
- Incumbent
- Assumed office 19 March 2018
- Constituency: Veneto 1, Montebelluna

Personal details
- Born: 10 January 1978 (age 48)
- Occupation: Politician

Ingrid Bisa (born 1978) is an Italian politician. She was elected to be a deputy to the Parliament of Italy in the 2018 Italian general election for the Legislature XVIII of Italy.

== Career ==
Bisa was born on 18 January 1978 in Asolo, Province of Treviso.

She was elected to the Italian Parliament in the 2018 Italian general election, to represent the district of Veneto 1 from Montebelluna, for the Lega Nord party.
