= Marialuisa Faro =

Italian politician

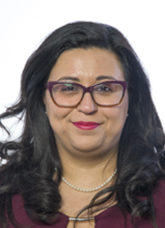

Member of Parliament of the Italian Republic
- In office March 23, 2018 – October 13, 2022

Personal details
- Born: July 12, 1984 (age 41); Catania, Italy
- Political party: M5S (until 2022); IpF (2022)
- Education: University of Catania
- Occupation: Politician

Marialuisa Faro (July 12, 1984, Catania, Italy) is an Italian politician and a member of the Italian Chamber of Deputies in the XVIII legislature of the Italian Republic representing the Five Star Movement.

From April 11 to June 21, 2018, she was a member of the Special Commission for the Examination of Government Acts.

Since June 21, 2018, she has been a member of the V Commission (Budget, Treasury, and Planning).

== Biography ==
In 2002, she obtained a diploma in accounting with a score of 90/100 from the "Carlo Gemmellaro" Technical Commercial Institute in Catania.

In 2007, she earned a degree in Economics and Management of Tourist Enterprises from the Faculty of Economics at the University of Catania.

For many years, she has been residing in San Nicandro Garganico, in the region of Apulia.

=== Political career ===
In 2013, she ran as a candidate with the Five Star Movement to become the mayor of the municipality of Sannicandro Garganico in the province of Foggia. She received 347 preferences (3.59% of the votes) but was not elected.

In 2018, during the so-called "parliamentary" selections of the Five Star Movement, she was nominated online with 142 preferences and was elected to the Chamber of Deputies for the Apulia constituency in the Plurinominal College Puglia - 04. She secured the second position on the Five Star Movement's list for the 2018 general elections.

On June 21, 2022, she left the Five Star Movement to join Together for the Future following a split led by Minister Luigi Di Maio.
