= Roberto Traversi =

Italian politician and architect

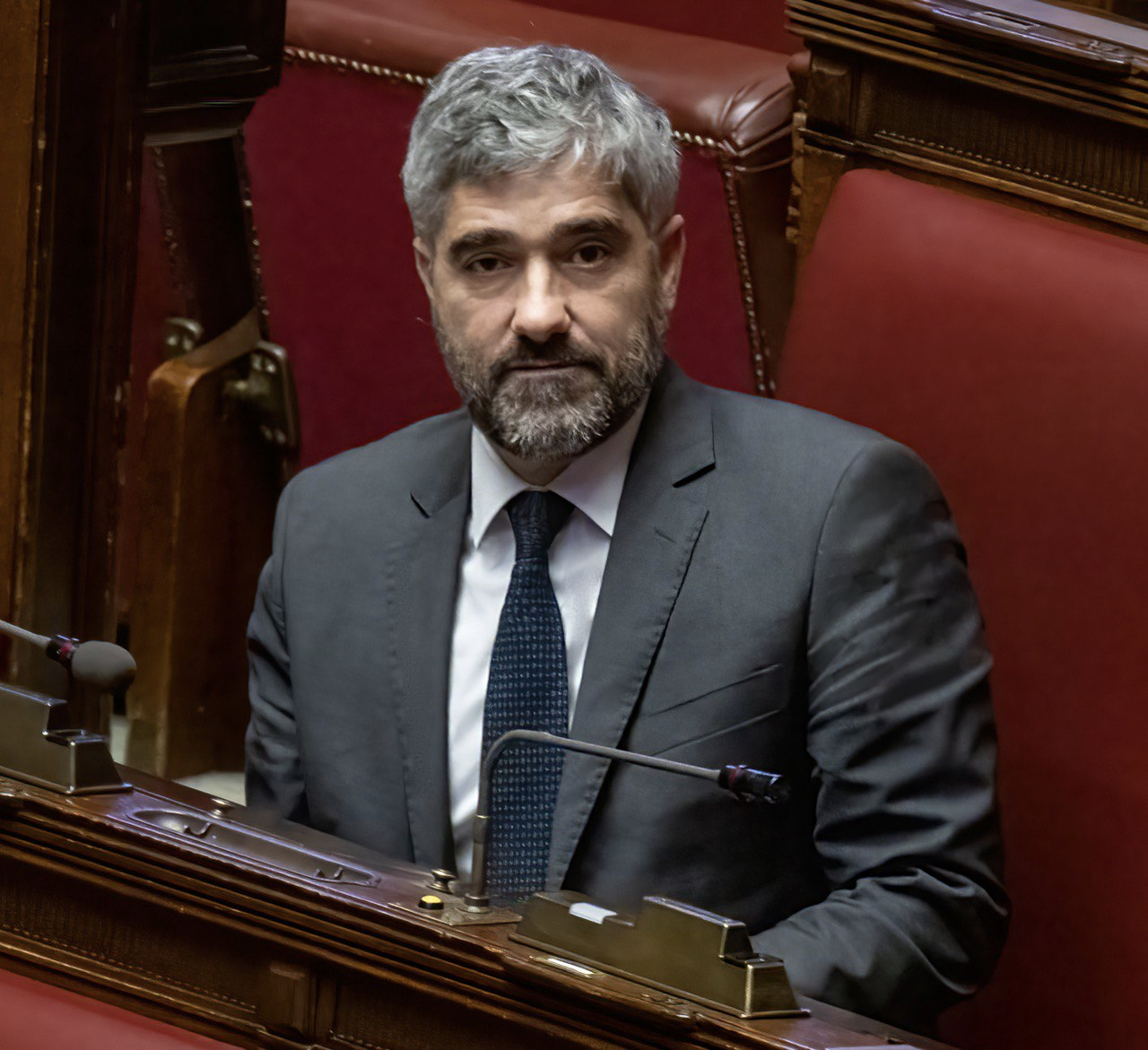

Undersecretary of State at the Ministry of Infrastructure and Transport
- In office September 16, 2019 – February 13, 2021
- Preceded by: Michele Dell'Orco
- Succeeded by: Giancarlo Cancelleri

Deputy of the Italian Republic
- Incumbent
- Assumed office March 23, 2018
- Parliamentary group: Five Star Movement

Personal details
- Born: December 1, 1969 (age 56) Milan, Italy
- Party: Five Star Movement
- Education: University of Genoa
- Occupation: Politician, architect

Roberto Traversi (born December 1, 1969, Milan, Italy) is an Italian politician.

A deputy in the Chamber of Deputies since March 23, 2018 for the 5 Star Movement, he was undersecretary of state at the Ministry of Infrastructure and Transport from September 13, 2019, to February 13, 2021, in the Conte II government.

== Biography ==
Born on December 1, 1969, in Milan, Italy. He graduated in architecture from the University of Genoa in 1997. He then devoted himself to the technical profession, privileging design, land protection, landscape and construction. He is involved in the direction of railway construction sites concerning the structural consolidation of viaducts and stations in Liguria and the securing of escarpments and slopes. In 2016 he became president of the Landscape Commission of the Union of Municipalities of the Middle Fontanabuona (Cicagna, Coreglia Ligure and Orero).

Alongside his technical activity, he also works as a journalist, registering as a publicist in 2014, and as the official photographer of Virtus Entella.

After his candidacy for mayor of Chiavari was blocked by the party leadership in 2017, in the 2018 general elections Traversi was elected deputy for the 5 Star Movement in the uninominal constituency Liguria - 03 (Genoa - Sestri Urban Unit) with 35.60 percent, surpassing Cristina Pozzi of the center-right (28.58 percent) and Mario Tullo of the center-left (26.51 percent). He was a member of the VIII Environment, Land and Public Works Committee, the IV Defense Committee, as well as speaker of the decree called "Sblocca cantieri". In about a year he was co-signer of 35 bills and first signer of the bill on combating major accidents involving hazardous substances.

After the creation of the Conte II government between the 5-Star Movement, Democratic Party and LeU, he was appointed by the Council of Ministers on September 13, 2019, as Undersecretary of State at the Ministry of Infrastructure and Transport, the only Ligurian in the government, taking office on September 16 and being given the delegation of responsibility for Italian ports and port system authorities and road safety, holding the post until February 13, 2021.

When his government experience ended, he resumed his activity in the House in March 2021 by joining the 9th Transportation Commission and being confirmed in the 8th Environment Commission, replacing Undersecretary Ilaria Fontana.

In June 2022, after the 5 Star Movement's disappointing results in that year's Ligurian municipal elections in Genoa (4.4 percent), La Spezia (2.01 percent), and Chiavari (2.8 percent), he was appointed by M5S President Giuseppe Conte as M5S regional coordinator in Liguria.

Ahead of the 2022 early parliamentary elections, in August with 555 votes he passed the online parliamentary primaries of M5S members, becoming a candidate for the Chamber of Deputies in the Liguria - 02 uninominal constituency (Genoa: Municipality VII - Ponente) and as a leading candidate in the Liguria - 01 plurinominal constituency. In the uninominal, he came third with 15.33%, behind Ilaria Cavo of the center-right (37.49%) and Katia Piccardo of the center-left (34.30%), but was elected to the plurinominal. On October 19, he was elected secretary of the House. In February 2023, he was confirmed as regional coordinator of the M5S.

== See also ==
- List of members of the Italian Chamber of Deputies, 2018–2022
- Legislature XVIII of Italy
- Legislature XIX of Italy
- List of members of the Italian Chamber of Deputies, 2022–
- Five Star Movement
- Second Conte government
