= Maria Pallini =

Italian politician

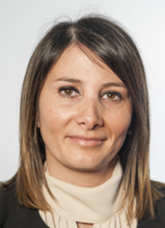

Member of the Parliament of Italy
- Incumbent
- Assumed office 19 March 2018
- Parliamentary group: Five Star Movement
- Constituency: Campania 1

Personal details
- Born: 25 May 1984 (age 41)
- Occupation: Politician

Maria Pallini is an Italian politician. She was elected to be a deputy to the Parliament of Italy in the 2018 Italian general election for the Legislature XVIII of Italy.

== Career ==
Pallini was born on 25 May 1984 in Avellino.

She was elected to the Italian Parliament in the 2018 Italian general election, to represent the district of Campania 2 for the Five Star Movement.
