= Simona Suriano =

Italian politician

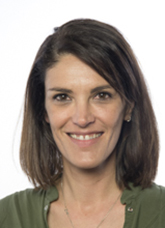

Member of the Parliament of Italy
- Incumbent
- Assumed office 19 March 2018
- Parliamentary group: Five Star Movement
- Constituency: Sicily 2

Personal details
- Born: 1 July 1978 (age 47) Catania
- Occupation: Politician

Simona Suriano is an Italian politician. She was elected to be a deputy to the Parliament of Italy in the 2018 Italian general election for the Legislature XVIII of Italy.

== Career ==
Suriano was born on 1 July 1978 in Catania.

She was elected to the Italian Parliament in the 2018 Italian general election, to represent the district of Sicily 2 for the Five Star Movement.
