= Gloria Saccani Jotti =

Italian politician

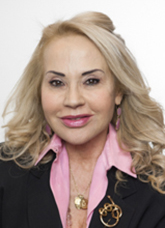

Member of the Parliament of Italy
- Incumbent
- Assumed office March 23, 2018
- Parliamentary group: Forza Italia
- Constituency: Lombardy 1

Personal details
- Occupation: Politician; Clinical pathology professor

Gloria Saccani Jotti is an Italian politician and professor of clinical pathology. She was elected to be a deputy to the Parliament of Italy in the 2018 Italian general election for the Legislature XVIII of Italy.

== Career ==
Jotti was born on October 24, 1956, in Reggio Emilia. She is an anatomical pathologist, and worked as a professor of clinical pathology at the University of Parma.

She was elected to the Italian Parliament in the 2018 Italian general election, to represent the district of Lombardy 1 for Forza Italia.
