= Marianna Iorio =

Italian politician

Member of the Parliament of Italy
- Incumbent
- Assumed office 23 March 2018
- Parliamentary group: Five Star Movement
- Constituency: Campania 2

Personal details
- Born: 11 February 1985 (age 41) Maddaloni
- Occupation: Politician

Marianna Iorio is an Italian politician. She was elected to be a deputy to the Parliament of Italy in the 2018 Italian general election for the Legislature XVIII of Italy.

== Career ==
Iorio was born on 11 February 1985 in Maddaloni.

She was elected to the Italian Parliament in the 2018 Italian general election, to represent the district of Campania 2 for the Five Star Movement.
