= Liguria (Chamber of Deputies constituency) =

- Chamber of Deputies; Electoral constituency
- Region: Liguria
- Electorate: 1,229,500 (2018)
- Major settlements: Genoa, Imperia, La Spezia, Savona

Current constituency
- Created: 1993
- Seats: 16
- Members: M5S (5); Lega (4); FI (4); PD (2); LeU (1)

Liguria is one of the 29 constituencies (Italian: circoscrizioni) represented in the Chamber of Deputies, the lower house of the Italian parliament. The constituency currently elects 16 deputies. Its boundaries correspond to those of the Italian region of Liguria. The electoral system uses a parallel voting system, which act as a mixed system, with 37% of seats allocated using a first-past-the-post electoral system and 61% using a proportional method, with one round of voting.

The constituency was first established by the Mattarella law on 4 August 1993 and later confirmed by the Calderoli law on 21 December 2005 and by the Rosato law on 3 November 2017.

== Members of the Parliament ==
=== 2018–present ===
Single-member districts
District			Deputy	Coalition	Party
N.	Name	Map	Deputy	Coalition	Party
01	Sanremo		Giorgio Mulé	Centre-right	Forza Italia
02	Savona		Sara Foscolo	Centre-right	League
03	Genoa–Sestri		Roberto Traversi	Five Star Movement	
04	Genoa–San Fruttuoso		Marco Rizzone	Five Star Movement	
05	Genoa–Rapallo		Roberto Bagnasco	Centre-right	Forza Italia
06	La Spezia		Manuela Gagliardi	Centre-right	Forza Italia

Multi-member districts
District			Party	Deputy
N.	Name	Map	Party	Deputy
01	Liguria – 01		Five Star Movement	Sergio Battelli
01	Liguria – 01		Five Star Movement	Leda Volpi
01	Liguria – 01		League	Fabio Di Muro
01	Liguria – 01		Democratic Party	Franco Vazio
02	Liguria – 02		League	Edoardo Rixi
02	Liguria – 02		League	Lorenzo Viviani
02	Liguria – 02		Five Star Movement	Simone Valente
02	Liguria – 02		Democratic Party	Raffaella Paita
02	Liguria – 02		Forza Italia	Roberto Cassinelli
02	Liguria – 02		Free and Equal	Luca Pastorino
