= Mara Lapia =

Italian politician

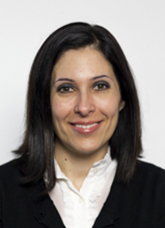

Member of the Parliament of Italy
- Incumbent
- Assumed office 23 March 2018
- Parliamentary group: Five Star Movement
- Constituency: Sardinia

Personal details
- Born: 22 August 1976 (age 49)
- Occupation: Politician

Mara Lapia is an Italian politician. She was elected to be a deputy to the Parliament of Italy in the 2018 Italian general election for the Legislature XVIII of Italy.

== Career ==
Lapia was born on 22 August 1976 in Nuoro. She is a lawyer, and has a degree in criminology.

She was elected to the Italian Parliament in the 2018 Italian general election, to represent the district of Sardinia for the Five Star Movement.
