= Alessandro Manuel Benvenuto =

Italian politician (born 1986)

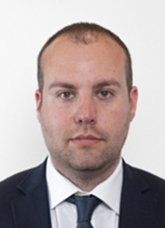
- Benvenuto in 2018

Member of the Chamber of Deputies
- Incumbent
- Assumed office 23 March 2018
- Constituency: Piedmont 1 – 05 (2018–2022); Piedmont 1 – 02 (2022–present)

Personal details
- Born: 23 July 1986 (age 39)
- Party: Lega

Alessandro Manuel Benvenuto (born 23 July 1986) is an Italian politician serving as a member of the Chamber of Deputies since 2018. From 2014 to 2018, he was a member of the Regional Council of Piedmont.
