= Francesca Businarolo =

Italian politician (born 1983)

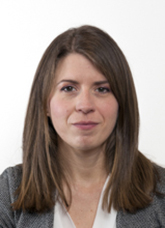
- Businarolo in 2018

Member of the Chamber of Deputies
- In office 15 March 2013 – 12 October 2022
- Constituency: Veneto 2 (2013–2018); Veneto 2 – P03 (2018–2022)

Personal details
- Born: 11 July 1983 (age 42)
- Party: Five Star Movement

Francesca Businarolo (born 11 July 1983) is an Italian politician. From 2013 to 2022, she was a member of the Chamber of Deputies. From 2019 to 2020, she served as chairwoman of the Justice Committee.
