= Giorgio Silli =

Italian politician (born 1977)

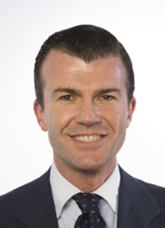
- Silli in 2018

Undersecretary of the Ministry of Foreign Affairs
- Incumbent
- Assumed office 2 November 2022
- Prime Minister: Giorgia Meloni

Member of the Chamber of Deputies
- In office 23 March 2018 – 12 October 2022
- Constituency: Tuscany

Personal details
- Born: 16 July 1977 (age 48)
- Party: Us Moderates (since 2022)
- Other political affiliations: PdL (2009–2013); FI (2013–2019); C! (2019–2022); CI (2021–2022); IaC (2022)

Giorgio Silli (born 16 July 1977) is an Italian politician of Us Moderates. Since 2022, he has served as undersecretary of the Ministry of Foreign Affairs. From 2018 to 2022, he was a member of the Chamber of Deputies.
