= Elisa Siragusa =

Italian politician

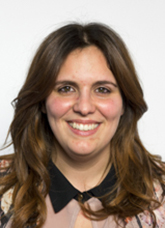
Elisa Siragusa in 2018.

Elisa Siragusa (born 17 July 1986) is an Italian politician. She was elected as a member of the Five Star Movement and has sat in the Chamber of Deputies since 2018.

== Political career ==
In January 2022, she joined the Green Europe party.

== See also ==
- List of members of the Italian Chamber of Deputies, 2018–2022
