= Alvise Maniero =

Italian politician (born 1985)

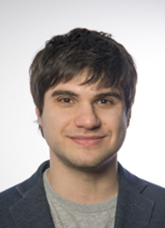
- Maniero in 2018

Member of the Chamber of Deputies
- In office 23 March 2018 – 12 October 2022
- Constituency: Veneto 1 – P01

Personal details
- Born: 8 September 1985 (age 40)
- Party: Independent (since 2025)
- Other political affiliations: Five Star Movement (2011–2021); Alternativa (2021–2025)

Alvise Maniero (born 8 September 1985) is an Italian politician. From 2018 to 2022, he was a member of the Chamber of Deputies. From 2012 to 2017, he served as mayor of Mira.

== Biography ==
He holds a degree in political science, international relations, and human rights from the University of Padua. In May 2012, at the age of 26, he was elected mayor of Mira for the Five Star Movement, defeating the incumbent mayor, Michele Carpinetti of the Democratic Party, in a runoff election. Maniero was the very first Five Star Movement mayor elected in the Veneto region—along with the mayor of Sarego—and in Italy. In June 2016, he announced that he would not seek re-election for a second term as mayor, thus concluding his tenure as mayor in 2017.

In the general election on March 4, 2018, he was elected to the Italian Parliament from the Veneto 1 - 01 (Venice) multi-member district. In 2021, he left the M5S to join Alternativa. He will complete his term in Parliament in the fall of 2022.
