= Arianna Lazzarini =

Italian politician (born 1976)

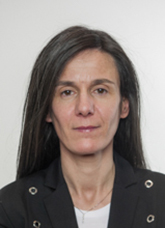

Member of the Parliament of Italy
- Incumbent
- Assumed office 19 March 2018
- Parliamentary group: Lega Nord
- Constituency: Veneto 2

Personal details
- Born: 6 March 1976 (age 50) Monselice
- Occupation: Politician

Arianna Lazzarini (born 6 March 1976) is an Italian politician. She was elected to be a deputy to the Parliament of Italy in the 2018 Italian general election for the Legislature XVIII of Italy.

== Career ==
Lazzarini was born on 6 March 1976 in Monselice.

She was elected to the Italian Parliament in the 2018 Italian general election, representing Veneto 2 for the Lega Nord.
