= Roberta Alaimo =

Italian politician

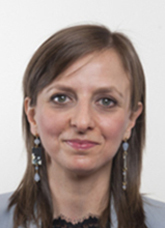

Member of the Parliament of Italy
- Incumbent
- Assumed office 23 March 2018
- Parliamentary group: Five Star Movement
- Constituency: Sicily 1

Personal details
- Born: 1979 (age 46–47) Corleone, Sicily, Italy
- Occupation: Politician

Roberta Alaimo (born 1979) is an Italian politician. She was elected to be a deputy to the Parliament of Italy in the 2018 Italian general election for the Legislature XVIII of Italy.

== Career ==
Alaimo was born in 1979, in Corleone.

She was elected to the Italian Parliament in the 2018 Italian general election, to represent the district of Sicily 1 for the Five Star Movement.
