= Roberto Pella =

Italian politician (born 1970)

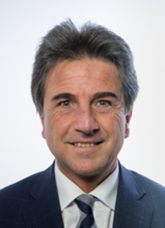
- Pella in 2018

Member of the Chamber of Deputies
- Incumbent
- Assumed office 23 March 2018
- Constituency: Piedmont 1 – 02 (2018–2022); Piedmont 1 – 05 (2022–present)

Personal details
- Born: 6 March 1970 (age 56)
- Party: Forza Italia

Roberto Pella (born 6 March 1970) is an Italian politician serving as a member of the Chamber of Deputies since 2018. He has served as mayor of Valdengo since 2014, having previously served from 1995 to 2004.
