= Andrea Dara =

Italian politician (born 1979)

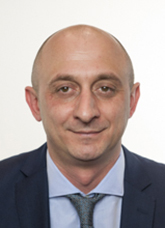
- Dara in 2018

Member of the Chamber of Deputies
- Incumbent
- Assumed office 23 March 2018
- Constituency: Lombardy 4 – U06 (2018–2022); Lombardy 4 – U04 (2022–present)

Personal details
- Born: 7 January 1979 (age 47)
- Party: Lega

Andrea Dara (born 7 January 1979) is an Italian politician serving as a member of the Chamber of Deputies since 2018. He has served as deputy mayor of Castiglione delle Stiviere since 2017.
