= Diego Zardini =

Italian politician (born 1978)

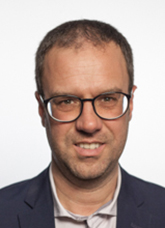
- Zardini in 2018

Member of the Chamber of Deputies
- In office 15 March 2013 – 12 October 2022
- Constituency: Veneto 2 (2013–2018); Veneto 2 – P03 (2018–2022)

Personal details
- Born: 3 August 1978 (age 47)
- Party: Democratic Party

Diego Zardini (born 3 August 1978) is an Italian politician. From 2013 to 2022, he was a member of the Chamber of Deputies. From 2009 to 2013, he was a provincial councillor of the province of Verona.
