= Gabriele Toccafondi =

Italian politician (born 1972)

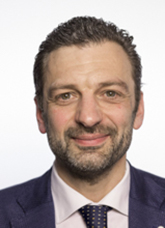
- Toccafondi in 2018

Member of the Chamber of Deputies
- In office 23 March 2018 – 12 October 2022
- Constituency: Tuscany – U01
- In office 29 April 2008 – 14 March 2013
- Constituency: Tuscany

Personal details
- Born: 15 April 1972 (age 54)
- Party: Italia Viva (since 2019)

Gabriele Toccafondi (born 15 April 1972) is an Italian politician. He was a member of the Chamber of Deputies from 2008 to 2013 and from 2018 to 2022. From 2013 to 2018, he served as undersecretary of the Ministry of Education, University and Research.
