= Rosalba Cimino =

Italian politician

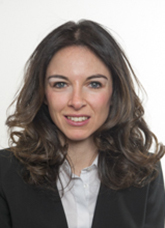

Deputy of the Italian Republic
- In office March 23, 2018 – October 12, 2022

Personal details
- Born: March 1, 1990 (age 35); Agrigento, Italy
- Political party: Five Star Movement
- Occupation: Politician

Rosalba Cimino (born 1 March 1990) is an Italian politician from the Five Star Movement. She was a member of the Chamber of Deputies from 2018 to 2022.

== See also ==
- List of members of the Italian Chamber of Deputies, 2018–2022
