= Francesco Berti (politician) =

Italian politician (born 1990)

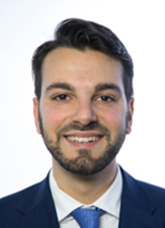
- Berti in 2018

Member of the Chamber of Deputies
- In office 23 March 2018 – 12 October 2022
- Constituency: Tuscany – P02

Personal details
- Born: 2 November 1990 (age 35)
- Party: Independent (since 2022)
- Other political affiliations: Five Star Movement (until 2022); Civic Commitment (2022)

Francesco Berti (born 2 November 1990) is an Italian politician. From 2018 to 2022, he was a member of the Chamber of Deputies. From 2018 to 2023, he was a substitute member of the Parliamentary Assembly of the Council of Europe.
