= Filippo Gallinella =

Italian politician (born 1979)

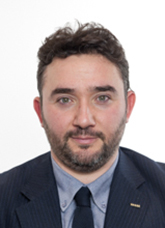
- Gallinella in 2018

Member of the Chamber of Deputies
- In office 15 March 2013 – 12 October 2022
- Constituency: Umbria (2013–2018); Umbria – P01 (2018–2022)

Personal details
- Born: 11 October 1979 (age 46)
- Party: Popular Alternative (since 2023)

Filippo Gallinella (born 11 October 1979) is an Italian politician. From 2013 to 2022, he was a member of the Chamber of Deputies. From 2018 to 2022, he served as chairman of the Agriculture Committee.
