= Niccolò Invidia =

Italian politician (born 1989)

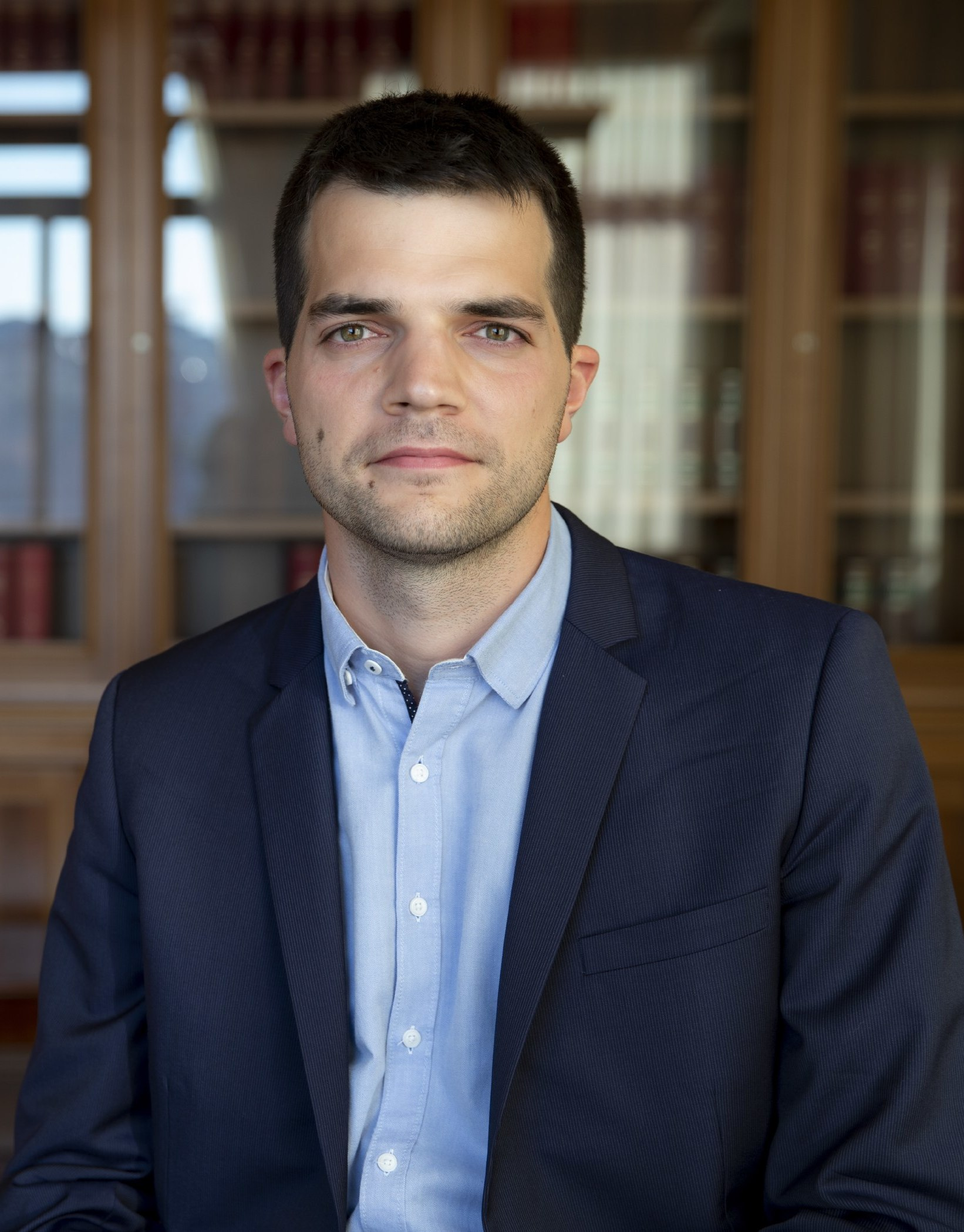

Member of the Chamber of Deputies
- Incumbent
- Assumed office 23 March 2018
- Constituency: Varese

Personal details
- Born: 13 November 1989 (age 36) Varese, Italy
- Party: Five Star Movement
- Education: Catholic University of the Sacred Heart; University of Groningen; SIOI
- Occupation: Politician, researcher

Niccolò Invidia, (Varese, 13 November 1989) is an Italian politician and member of the Chamber of Deputies.

== Biography ==
Invidia graduated the Catholic University of the Sacred Heart in Milan and then the University of Groningen (the Netherlands).

He then has worked for the Rathenau Instituut, the Millennium Project and then at the European Parliament

== Political career ==
Activist since 2012, Invidia is elected with the Five Star Movement at the Parliament in the elections of 2018. He is currently party leader in the Labour committee and coordinates the Space and Innovation parliamentary intergroups, at the Chamber of Deputies . He is also member of the OSCE Parliamentary Assembly

Invidia embraces a post-ideological approach to politics. He focuses his interest on innovation, space and work. He strongly believes in the potential of accelerating technologies and supports transhumanist ideas.

In the Italian parliament Niccolò Invidia has proposed a reform of the technical vocational schools, a proposal for the work sector in the gig economy, the introduction of the DESI Index (Digital Economy and Society Index) as economic measurement that supports the GDP, a proposal for the introduction of a permanent parliamentary committee on Innovation, a reform aiming to collect in digital form the signatures in support of a referendum.
