= Eugenio Zoffili =

Italian politician (born 1979)

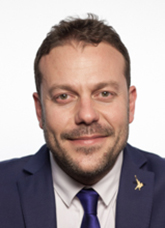
- Zoffili Vigna in 2018

Member of the Chamber of Deputies
- Incumbent
- Assumed office 23 March 2018
- Constituency: Lombardy 2 – 02 (2018–2022); Lombardy 2 – 02 (2022–present)

Personal details
- Born: 25 October 1979 (age 46)
- Party: Lega

Eugenio Zoffili (born 25 October 1979) is an Italian politician serving as a member of the Chamber of Deputies since 2018. He has served as president of the Italian delegation to the Organization for Security and Co-operation in Europe since 2023.
