= Ugo Parolo =

Italian politician (born 1963)

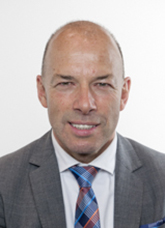
- Parolo in 2018

Member of the Chamber of Deputies
- In office 23 March 2018 – 12 October 2022
- Constituency: Lombardy 3 – U01
- In office 9 May 1996 – 27 April 2006
- Constituency: Morbegno

Member of the Regional Council of Lombardy
- In office 23 April 2010 – 26 March 2018

Personal details
- Born: 1 March 1963 (age 63)
- Party: Lega

Ugo Parolo (born 1 March 1963) is an Italian politician. He was a member of the Chamber of Deputies from 1996 to 2006 and from 2018 to 2022. From 2010 to 2018, he was a member of the Regional Council of Lombardy. From 1993 to 2001, he served as mayor of Colico.

== Biography ==
A resident of Colico, where he served as mayor from 1993 to 2001 and as a city council member from 2001 to 2016, he holds a degree in Architecture from the Polytechnic University of Milan. He is an architect working in the construction industry.
