= Carolina Varchi =

Italian politician (born 1983)

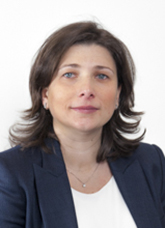
- Varchi in 2018

Member of the Chamber of Deputies
- Incumbent
- Assumed office 23 March 2018
- Constituency: Sicily 1

Personal details
- Born: 14 October 1983 (age 42)
- Party: Brothers of Italy

Maria Carolina Varchi (born 14 October 1983) is an Italian politician of Brothers of Italy who has served in the Chamber of Deputies since 2018. She was previously deputy mayor of Palermo from 2022 to 2024, and vice president of Young Italy from 2010 to 2012.
