= Simone Billi =

Italian politician (born 1976)

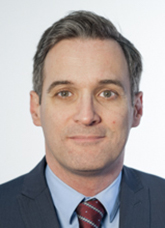
- Billi in 2018

Member of the Chamber of Deputies
- Incumbent
- Assumed office 23 March 2018
- Constituency: Europe

Personal details
- Born: 11 February 1976 (age 50)
- Party: Lega (since 2016)

Simone Billi (born 11 February 1976) is an Italian politician serving as a member of the Chamber of Deputies since 2018. He has been a member of the Parliamentary Assembly of the Council of Europe since 2018.
