= Erasmo Palazzotto =

Italian politician (born 1982)

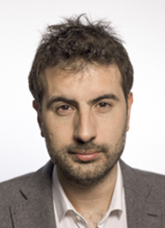
- Palazzotto in 2018

Member of the Chamber of Deputies
- In office 15 March 2013 – 12 October 2022
- Constituency: Sicily 1 (2013–2018); Sicily 1 – P01 (2018–2022)

Personal details
- Born: 19 November 1982 (age 43)
- Party: Democratic Party (since 2022)

Erasmo Palazzotto (born 19 November 1982) is an Italian politician. From 2013 to 2022, he was a member of the Chamber of Deputies. From 2015 to 2018, he served as deputy chairman of the foreign affairs committee.
