= Luca Carabetta =

Italian politician (born 1991)

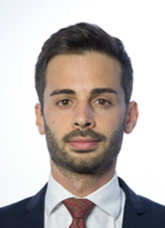
- Carabetta in 2018

Member of the Chamber of Deputies
- In office 23 March 2018 – 12 October 2022
- Constituency: Piedmont 1 – P02

Personal details
- Born: 10 June 1991 (age 35)
- Party: Five Star Movement

Luca Carabetta (born 10 June 1991) is an Italian politician. From 2018 to 2022, he was a member of the Chamber of Deputies. From 2018 to 2020, he served as deputy chairman of the Productive Activities Committee.

== Biography ==
A graduate of the Polytechnic University of Turin with a degree in Energy Engineering, he has worked as an innovation consultant and project manager. The founder of two startups in the field of new technologies, he also served as a parliamentary assistant for the Five Star Movement during the 17th legislature of the Italian Republic.

In the 2018 general election, he was elected to the Chamber of Deputies as a member of the Five Star Movement in the Piedmont 1 - 02 multi-member district. In June 2018, he was elected Vice Chair of the Chamber of Deputies’ Committee on Productive Activities.

He served as head of innovation for the Five Star Movement’s “Team of the Future” from 2019 to 2021. Since December 2021, he has served as coordinator of the Five Star Movement’s digital transition committee.

In the 2022 general election, he ran as a candidate for the Five Star Movement in the single-member district of Piedmont 1 - 03 (Collegno), where he received 14.59% of the vote and was defeated by Elena Maccanti of the center-right (39.94%) and Davide Gariglio of the center-left (31.20%); he also placed second in the multi-member constituency of Piedmont 1 - 02, but since the list did not win any seats there, he was not reelected.

Since July 2025, he has served as Country Manager of Trade Republic Italia.
