= Luciano Cantone =

Italian politician (born 1987)

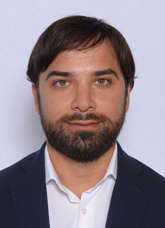
- Cantone in 2022

Member of the Chamber of Deputies
- Incumbent
- Assumed office 23 March 2018
- Constituency: Sicily 2 – P02 (2018–2022); Sicily 2 – P02 (2022–present)

Personal details
- Born: 24 May 1987 (age 39)
- Party: Five Star Movement

Luciano Cantone (born 24 May 1987) is an Italian politician serving as a member of the Chamber of Deputies since 2018. He has been a member of the NATO Parliamentary Assembly since 2023.

== Biography ==
After earning his aviation technician diploma in 2006, he began working in the civil aviation sector at ENAV as a flight support specialist and airport meteorologist. He graduated with a degree in Transportation Science and Technology in 2023.
