= Andrea Giarrizzo =

Italian politician (born 1992)

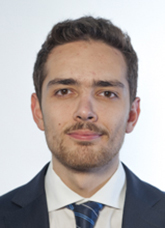
- Giarrizzo in 2018

Member of the Chamber of Deputies
- In office 23 March 2018 – 12 October 2022
- Constituency: Sicily 2 – U03

Personal details
- Born: 1 December 1992 (age 33)
- Party: Independent (since 2022)
- Other political affiliations: Five Star Movement (2018–2022); Civic Commitment (2022)

Andrea Giarrizzo (born 1 December 1992) is an Italian politician. From 2018 to 2022, he was a member of the Chamber of Deputies. From 2020 to 2022, he served as deputy chairman of the Productive Activities Committee.
