= Martina Nardi =

Italian politician (born 1973)

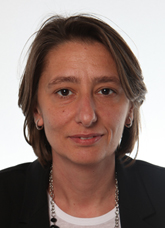
- Nardi in 2013

Member of the Chamber of Deputies
- In office 15 March 2013 – 12 October 2022
- Constituency: Tuscany (2013–2018); Tuscany – P01 (2018–2022)

Personal details
- Born: 23 September 1973 (age 52)
- Party: Democratic Party (since 2014)

Martina Nardi (born 23 September 1973) is an Italian politician. From 2013 to 2022, she was a member of the Chamber of Deputies. From 2020 to 2022, she served as chairwoman of the Productive Activities Committee.

== Biography ==
An activist in the Italian Communist Youth Federation—the youth wing of the Italian Communist Party (PCI)—since she was a teenager, in 1991 she did not join Achille Occhetto’s “Bolognina” shift from the PCI to the Democratic Party of the Left, but instead joined the movement for Communist Refoundation, which became the Communist Refoundation Party, where she went on to serve as secretary of the provincial federation of Province of Massa-Carrara.

In the 2003 municipal elections in Tuscany, she ran for mayor of Massa, backed by Communist Refoundation Party, and received 5.42% of the vote; she was not elected mayor but became a city council member nonetheless. In the subsequent 2008 municipal elections, she was re-elected to the Massa City Council as a member of The Left – The Rainbow, and subsequently served as deputy mayor and councilor responsible for construction and housing policy in the left-wing city administration led by Roberto Pucci.

In 2009, she left Rifondazione Comunista and ran in the European elections on the Left Ecology Freedom ticket in the Central Italy constituency, receiving approximately 3,500 votes but failing to win a seat.

A few months later, he helped found Nichi Vendola Left Ecology Freedom (SEL).
