= Lucia Annibali =

Italian lawyer and politician

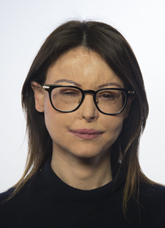

Member of the Chamber of Deputies
- In office 23 March 2018 – 13 October 2022
- Constituency: Veneto 2

Personal details
- Born: 18 September 1977 (age 49) Urbino, Italy
- Party: Democratic Party (2018-2019); Italia Viva (since 2019)
- Education: University of Urbino
- Occupation: Lawyer, politician

Lucia Annibali (born 18 September 1977) is an Italian lawyer and politician.

== Biography ==
Born in Urbino in 1977, Annibali graduated in Law at the University of Urbino and became a lawyer.

Her name emerged in the news on 16 April 2013, when her face was scarred with acid by two men sent by her former boyfriend, Luca Varani. In a 2014 decision upheld on appeal in 2016, Varani was sentenced to 20 years imprisonment for attempted murder and stalking, while the two men who materially committed the crime were sentenced to 12 years.

Annibali told this story in the book Io ci sono. La mia storia di non amore (I am here. My non-love story), written with journalist Giusi Fasano and published in 2014.

On 21 November 2013, the President of the Republic Giorgio Napolitano named her a Knight of the Order of Merit of the Italian Republic.

After a year as an advisor to former minister Maria Elena Boschi regarding the fight against gender violence, in the 2018 general elections Annibali was elected to the Chamber of Deputies for the Democratic Party. In 2019 she left Democratic Party and passed to Italia Viva.
