= Felice Maurizio D'Ettore =

Italian politician (1960–2024)

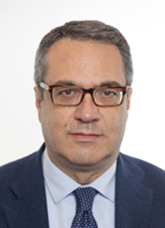
- D'Ettore in 2018

Member of the Chamber of Deputies of Italy for Toscana - 07
- In office 23 March 2018 – 13 October 2022

Personal details
- Born: 22 July 1960 Naples, Italy
- Died: 22 August 2024 (aged 64) Locri, Italy
- Party: FI (1994–2009); PdL (2009–2013); FI (2013–2021); CI (2021–2022); FdI (2022–2024)
- Education: University of Pisa
- Occupation: Lawyer

Felice Maurizio D'Ettore (22 July 1960 – 22 August 2024) was an Italian politician. A member of Forza Italia and Coraggio Italia, he served in the Chamber of Deputies from 2018 to 2022.

D'Ettore died after a sudden illness in Locri, on 22 August 2024, at the age of 64.
