= Cosimo Ferri =

Italian politician (born 1971)

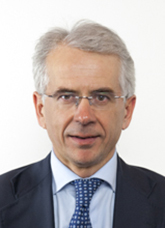

State Secretary at the Ministry of Justice
- In office 3 May 2013 – 1 June 2018
- Preceded by: Salvatore Mazzamuto; Antonino Gullo; Sabato Malinconico
- Succeeded by: Vittorio Ferraresi; Jacopo Morrone

Deputy of the Italian Republic
- In office 23 March 2018 – 12 October 2022

Personal details
- Born: April 17, 1971 (age 55) Pontremoli, Italy
- Party: PD {until 2019); IV (since 2019)
- Education: University of Pisa
- Occupation: Politician

Cosimo Maria Ferri (born April 17, 1971, in Pontremoli, Italy) is an Italian politician and former magistrate. He served as the Undersecretary of State for Justice in the Letta government, the Renzi government, and the Gentiloni government. Since 2018, he has been a member of the Italian Parliament as a deputy for the Democratic Party, and from September 2019, he has represented Italia Viva. He also previously served as a member of the High Council of the Judiciary.

== Biography ==
Ferri was born in Pontremoli, in the province of Massa-Carrara, son of the magistrate Enrico Ferri (MEP, Member of the Chamber of Deputies, Minister of Public Works in the De Mita government and Secretary of the PSDI). Ferri graduated in law from the University of Pisa in 1993.

=== Political activity ===
==== Undersecretary for Justice ====
Following the formation of the grand coalition government led by Enrico Letta, which included The People of Freedom (PdL), Democratic Party (PD), Union of the Centre, and Civic Choice, on May 3, 2013, Cosimo Ferri became a part of the Letta government. He was appointed as the Undersecretary of State at the Ministry of Justice on May 2 by the Council of Ministers (CdM). He represented the PdL in this role and worked alongside Minister Anna Maria Cancellieri.

After the crisis that saw the Berlusconi component of the Letta government leave, he declared himself a technician (in fact he was not a candidate in the elections) and remained undersecretary.

With the fall and end of the Letta government due to the decision of the newly elected Secretary of the PD, Matteo Renzi, to become the Prime Minister, and with the formation of his government, on February 28, 2014, Ferri was confirmed as the Undersecretary of State for Justice by the Council of Ministers (CdM). He worked alongside the new PD Minister, Andrea Orlando.

On July 6, 2014, during the renewal of sixteen members of the High Council of the Judiciary (CSM), a controversy arose regarding an SMS sent by Ferri to his former colleagues from the Magistratura indipendente, in which he directed their votes in favor of Lorenzo Pontecorvo, a section president at the Civil Court of Rome, and Luca Forteleoni, Substitute Prosecutor in Nuoro. The National Association of Magistrates (ANM) immediately reacted by accusing him of undue political interference in the electoral activities of the CSM.

With the birth of the government headed by Paolo Gentiloni, on the following 29 December 2016 he was still confirmed in the role of undersecretary for justice, which he will keep until 1 June 2018.

==== Member of the House ====
In the 2018 political elections, he ran as a candidate for the Chamber of Deputies in the single-member constituency Tuscany – 08 (Massa) as part of the center-left coalition representing the Democratic Party (PD). He received 25.46% of the vote and was defeated by Deborah Bergamini from the center-right (37.44%) and Adriano Simoncini from the Five Star Movement (28.94%). However, he was elected as the top candidate for the Democratic Party in the multi-member constituency Tuscany – 04.

Following the split of the PD by the group of Renziani MPs, Cosimo Ferri joined Italia Viva (IV) in September 2019, the party founded by Matteo Renzi with liberal and centrist leanings.

In the 2022 municipal elections in Tuscany, he ran for mayor of Carrara, supported by a coalition formed by the Italian Socialist Party and the civic lists Lista Ferri (supported by Italia Viva) and #PrimaCarrara. In the first round he collected 15.1% of the vote, coming fourth and not accessing the runoff, at which he decided to support the Lega candidate Simone Caffaz, who was however defeated by the centre-left candidate Serena Arrighi.

In the 2022 political elections, he was re-nominated as a candidate for the Chamber of Deputies in the single-member constituency Tuscany – 02 (Massa) for the Action – Italia Viva list. He received 8.59% of the vote and finished in fourth place (Elisa Montemagni from the center-right won with 44.86%). Additionally, he ran as the top candidate in the multi-member constituency Liguria – 01 and in the third position in the multi-member constituency Emilia-Romagna – 01, but was not re-elected.
