= Francesco D'Uva =

Italian politician (born 1987)

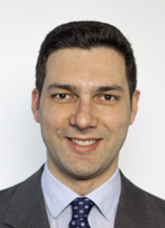
- D'Uva in 2018

Member of the Chamber of Deputies
- In office 15 March 2013 – 12 October 2022
- Constituency: Sicily 2 (2013–2018); Sicily 2 – U01 (2018–2022)

Personal details
- Born: 25 September 1987 (age 38)
- Party: Independent (since 2022)
- Other political affiliations: Five Star Movement (2009–2022); Civic Commitment (2022)

Francesco D'Uva (born 25 September 1987) is an Italian politician. From 2013 to 2022, he was a member of the Chamber of Deputies. From 2018 to 2019, he served as group leader of the Five Star Movement. From 2019 to 2022, he served as quaestor of the Chamber.
