= Luca Sani =

Italian politician

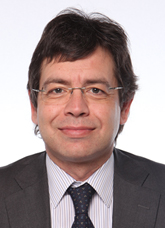

Member of the Chamber of Deputies
- In office 30 September 2020 – 13 October 2022
- In office 5 May 2008 – 22 March 2018

Mayor of Massa Marittima
- In office 24 April 1995 – 14 June 2004
- Preceded by: Renato Bolognini
- Succeeded by: Lidia Bai

Personal details
- Born: 19 March 1965 (age 61) Massa Marittima, Province of Grosseto, Italy
- Party: Italian Communist Party (until 1991); Democratic Party of the Left (1991–1998); Democrats of the Left (1998–2007); Democratic Party (since 2007)

Luca Sani (born 19 March 1965) is an Italian politician who served as mayor of Massa Marittima (1995–2004), and Deputy (2008–2018, 2020–2022).
