= Maria Cristina Caretta =

Italian politician (born 1964)

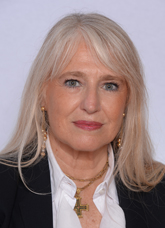
- Caretta in 2022

Member of the Chamber of Deputies
- Incumbent
- Assumed office 23 March 2018
- Constituency: Veneto 2 – U07 (2018–2022); Veneto 2 – U05 (2022–present)

Personal details
- Born: 11 January 1964 (age 62)
- Party: Brothers of Italy

Maria Cristina Caretta (born 11 January 1964) is an Italian politician serving as a member of the Chamber of Deputies since 2018. She has served as deputy chairwoman of the agriculture committee since 2022.
