= Edoardo Ziello =

Italian politician (born 1992)

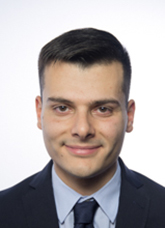
- Ziello in 2018

Member of the Chamber of Deputies
- Incumbent
- Assumed office 23 March 2018
- Constituency: Tuscany

Personal details
- Born: 11 April 1992 (age 34)
- Party: Lega (until 2026); FN (2026–present)

Edoardo Ziello (born 11 April 1992) is an Italian politician. Since 2018, he has been a member of the Chamber of Deputies for Lega, until 2026, when he switched party to National Future.

He also served as a city councillor of Pisa and as group leader of Lega in the city council until 2024.
