= David Ermini =

Italian lawyer and politician

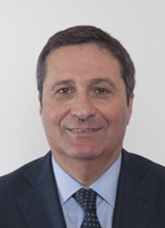

Mayor of Figline e Incisa Valdarno
- Incumbent
- Assumed office 26 May 2026
- Preceded by: Valerio Pianigiani

Vice president of the CSM
- In office 27 September 2018 – 24 January 2023
- Preceded by: Giovanni Legnini
- Succeeded by: Fabio Pinelli

Member of the Chamber of Deputies
- In office 15 March 2013 – 25 September 2018
- Constituency: Tuscany

Personal details
- Born: 1 November 1959 (age 66) Figline Valdarno, Italy
- Party: Democratic Party
- Education: University of Florence
- Occupation: Lawyer, politician

David Ermini (born 1 November 1959) is an Italian lawyer and politician, vice president of the High Council of the Judiciary from 2018 to 2023.

== Biography ==
He studied at the Italian Liceo classico in Figline Valdarno, having Maurizio Sarri as his deskmate. Subsequently, he graduated in law at the University of Florence, and Ermini began to work as a criminal lawyer. He entered politics in the late 1970s and became a city councilor of his hometown Figline Valdarno, elected with the Christian Democracy.

From 2004 to 2013, he was a provincial councilor at the Province of Florence, elected with The Daisy and later with the Democratic Party. From 2009 to 2013 he was also President of the Provincial Assembly of Florence.

After the 2013 election, Ermini was elected at the Chamber of Deputies. He was re-elected during the 2018 election, but left his deputy seat after his election at the High Council of the Judiciary. On 27 September 2018, Ermini was elected vice president of the High Council of the Judiciary.

He is considered to be very close to former Prime Minister Matteo Renzi.
