= Davide Aiello =

Italian politician

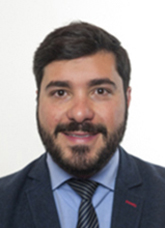

Member of the Chamber of Deputies (Italy)
- Incumbent
- Assumed office September 30, 2022

Personal details
- Born: October 31, 1985 (age 40) Palermo
- Party: 5 Star Movement
- Occupation: Casteldaccia City Council between 2013 and 2017

Davide Aiello is a member of the Parliament of Italy. He was elected in 2018 and 2022.

He had previously served as a member of the Casteldaccia City Council between 2013 and 2017.

== Biography ==
He is the great-grandson of Andrea Raia, a communist trade unionist who was killed by the Mafia in Casteldaccia in 1944.

In 2016, he earned a law degree from the University of Palermo.
