= Carlo Sibilia =

Italian politician

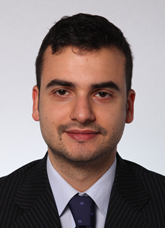
Carlo Sibilia in 2013.

Carlo Sibilia (born 7 February 1986) is an Italian politician who has been an MP from the Five Star Movement since 2013.
