= Dimitri Coin =

Italian politician (born 1970)

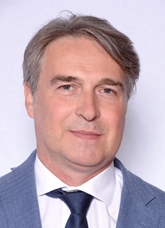
- Coin in 2022

Member of the Chamber of Deputies
- Incumbent
- Assumed office 23 March 2018
- Constituency: Veneto 1 – U04 (2018–2022); Veneto 1 – U04 (2022–present)

Personal details
- Born: 1 June 1970 (age 55)
- Party: Lega

Dimitri Coin (born 1 June 1970) is an Italian politician serving as a member of the Chamber of Deputies since 2018. From 2004 to 2014, he was a municipal councillor of Morgano.
