= Erik Umberto Pretto =

Italian politician (born 1984)

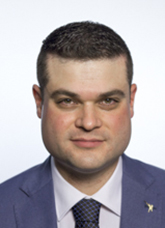
- Pretto in 2018

Member of the Chamber of Deputies
- Incumbent
- Assumed office 23 March 2018
- Constituency: Veneto 2 – 02 (2018–2022); Veneto 2 – 02 (2022–present)

Personal details
- Born: 24 December 1984 (age 41)
- Party: Lega

Erik Umberto Pretto (born 24 December 1984) is an Italian politician serving as a member of the Chamber of Deputies since 2018. From 2011 to 2012, he was an assessor of Marano Vicentino.
