= Giorgia Andreuzza =

Italian politician (born 1973)

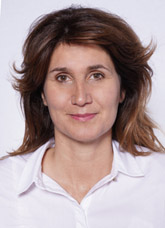
- Andreuzza in 2022

Member of the Chamber of Deputies
- Incumbent
- Assumed office 23 March 2018
- Constituency: Veneto 1 – U01 (2018–2022); Veneto 1 – U02 (2022–present)

Personal details
- Born: 11 December 1973 (age 52)
- Party: Lega

Giorgia Andreuzza (born 11 December 1973) is an Italian politician serving as a member of the Chamber of Deputies since 2018. She was a municipal councillor of Noventa di Piave from 2012 to 2015 and from 2017 to 2021.
