= Elisabetta Ripani =

Italian politician (born 1986)

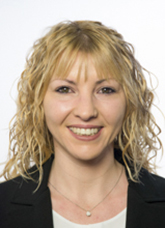

Member of the Chamber of Deputies
- In office 23 March 2018 – 13 October 2022

Personal details
- Born: 30 March 1986 (age 40) Grosseto, Tuscany, Italy
- Party: Forza Italia (2013–21); Coraggio Italia (2021–22); Vinciamo Italia (2022–23)

Elisabetta Ripani (born 30 March 1986) is an Italian politician who served as a Deputy from 23 March 2018 to 13 October 2022.

== Life and career ==
Born in Grosseto on 30 March 1986, the daughter of lawyer and baseball executive Giulio Ripani, she completed her secondary education at the "Carducci-Ricasoli" classical high school and attended the law faculty at the University of Florence. She began her political career in the youth movement of Forza Italia in Florence and then in Grosseto.

In 2016, Ripani was elected at the city council of Grosseto in support of the mayor Antonfrancesco Vivarelli Colonna, serving as group leader and head of communication and youth policies for Forza Italia.

In the 2018 general elections, she was a candidate for the Chamber of Deputies and was elected in the Tuscany 4 constituency. From 21 June 2018 to 5 January 2022, she was a member of the Fourth Commission for Defense.

On 27 May 2021, Ripani joined Coraggio Italia, a party founded by Luigi Brugnaro and Giovanni Toti, along with other members of the parliament from different backgrounds. On 18 November, she was appointed coordinator of the party in Umbria. On 23 June 2022, she left Coraggio Italia and joined the "Vinciamo Italia" association founded by Marco Marin. Ripani did not run for the 2022 elections.
