= Raphael Raduzzi =

Italian politician (born 1991)

Member of the Chamber of Deputies
- In office 23 March 2018 – 12 October 2022
- Constituency: Veneto 2 – P01

Personal details
- Born: 28 April 1991 (age 35)
- Party: Pro Italia (since 2023)
- Other political affiliations: Five Star Movement (2018–2021); Alternativa (2021–2023)

Raphael Raduzzi (born 28 April 1991) is an Italian politician. From 2018 to 2022, he was a member of the Chamber of Deputies. He previously worked as a management consultant.
