= Valentina D'Orso =

Italian politician (born 1980)

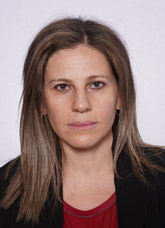
- D'Orso in 2022

Member of the Chamber of Deputies
- Incumbent
- Assumed office 23 March 2018
- Constituency: Sicily 1 – P01 (2018–2022); Sicily 1 – P01 (2022–present)

Personal details
- Born: 29 July 1980 (age 45)
- Party: Five Star Movement

Valentina D'Orso (born 29 July 1980) is an Italian politician serving as a member of the Chamber of Deputies since 2018. She has served as secretary of the inquiry committee on the death of David Rossi since 2024.
