= Yana Chiara Ehm =

Italian politician (born 1990)

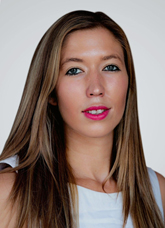
- Ehm in 2018

Member of the Chamber of Deputies
- In office 23 March 2018 – 12 October 2022
- Constituency: Tuscany – P03

Personal details
- Born: 19 June 1990 (age 36)
- Party: Independent (since 2021)
- Other political affiliations: Five Star Movement (2018–2021)

Yana Chiara Ehm (born 19 June 1990) is a German-born Italian politician. From 2018 to 2022, she was a member of the Chamber of Deputies. She previously worked at the Embassy of Germany in Rome.

== Biography ==
Born in Gusterath (Germany) to a German father and an Italian mother, Yana Ehm has lived in San Clemente di Reggello (FI) since 2016. She earned a bachelor’s degree in political science and Islamic studies from the University of Heidelberg, and subsequently obtained a master’s degree in international relations with a focus on the Middle East, the Caucasus, and Central Asia from the University of St Andrews.

An avid traveler, Ehm has studied and worked in Palestine (region), Jordan, Morocco, and Tanzania. For a time, she was also employed at the German Embassy in Rome.
