= Erica Mazzetti =

Italian politician (born 1977)

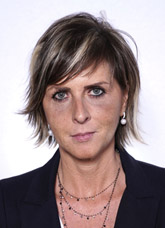
- Mazzetti in 2022

Member of the Chamber of Deputies
- Incumbent
- Assumed office 23 March 2018
- Constituency: Tuscany – P01 (2018–2022); Tuscany – U06 (2022–present)

Personal details
- Born: 31 May 1977 (age 49)
- Party: Forza Italia (since 2013)

Erica Mazzetti (born 31 May 1977) is an Italian politician serving as a member of the Chamber of Deputies since 2018. From 2004 to 2014, she was a municipal councillor of Vernio.
