= Manfredi Potenti =

Italian politician (born 1976)

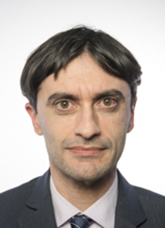
- Potenti in 2018

Member of the Senate
- Incumbent
- Assumed office 13 October 2022
- Constituency: Tuscany – U02

Member of the Chamber of Deputies
- In office 23 March 2018 – 12 October 2022
- Constituency: Tuscany – P04

Personal details
- Born: 21 July 1976 (age 49)
- Party: Lega

Manfredi Potenti (born 21 July 1976) is an Italian politician serving as a member of the Senate since 2022. From 2018 to 2022, he was a member of the Chamber of Deputies.
