= Stefano Ceccanti =

Italian politician (born 1961)

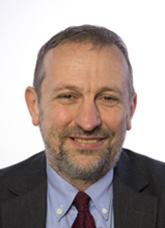
- Ceccanti in 2018

Member of the Chamber of Deputies
- In office 23 March 2018 – 12 October 2022
- Constituency: Tuscany – P02

Member of the Senate
- In office 29 April 2008 – 14 March 2013
- Constituency: Piedmont

Personal details
- Born: 27 January 1961 (age 65)
- Party: Democratic Party (since 2007)

Stefano Ceccanti (born 27 January 1961) is an Italian politician. From 2018 to 2022, he was a member of the Chamber of Deputies. From 2008 to 2013, he was a member of the Senate.
