= Legislature XVIII of Italy =

18th legislature of the Italian Republic (2018–2022)

Legislature XVIII of Italy XVIII legislatura della Repubblica Italiana
- 18th legislature

Type
- Type: bicameral
- Houses: Chamber of Deputies; Senate of the Republic

History
- Founded: 23 March 2018
- Disbanded: 12 October 2022 (4 years, 203 days)
- Preceded by: XVII Legislature
- Succeeded by: XIX Legislature

Leadership
- President of the Senate: Maria Elisabetta Alberti Casellati, FI since 24 March 2018
- President of the Chamber of Deputies: Roberto Fico, M5S since 24 March 2018

Structure
- Seats: C: 630; S: 321 (315 + 6)
- Chamber of Deputies political groups: LSP (131); PD (97); M5S (96); FI (68); IpF (49); FdI (40); IV (32); LeU (10); Mixed (107)
- Senate political groups: M5S (62); LSP (61); FI (47); PD (39); FdI (21); IV–PSI (15); CAL (13); IpF (11); Aut (8); Mixed + NI (44)

Elections
- Chamber of Deputies voting system: Rosatellum
- Senate voting system: Rosatellum
- Last general election: 4 March 2018
- Next general election: 25 September 2022

Meeting place
- Palazzo Montecitorio, Rome (C)
- Palazzo Madama, Rome (S)

Website
- www.camera.it/leg18/1 www.senato.it/Leg18/home

Constitution
- Constitution of Italy

Legislature XVIII of Italy (Italian: XVIII Legislatura della Repubblica Italiana) started on 23 March 2018 and ended on 12 October 2022. The composition of the Chamber of Deputies and of the Senate is the one resulting from the 4 March 2018 election, called after the dissolution of the Parliament announced by President Sergio Mattarella on 28 December 2017.

The members of this legislature have on average the lowest age in the history of the Italian Republic: 44 years old in the Chamber of Deputies and 52 in the Senate. This legislature has also the largest number of new MPs and the highest percentage of women (34%) in Italian history.

== Government ==
Prime Minister	Party	Term of office		Government	Composition
Prime Minister	Party	Took office	Left office	Government	Composition
Giuseppe Conte (b. 1964)	Independent	1 June 2018	5 September 2019	Conte I	M5S • Lega
Giuseppe Conte (b. 1964)	Independent	5 September 2019	13 February 2021	Conte II	M5S • PD • LeU • IV
Mario Draghi (b. 1947)	Independent	13 February 2021	22 October 2022	Draghi	M5S • Lega • PD • FI • IpF • IV • Art.1 • A • A2050 (National unity government)

== Composition ==
=== Chamber of Deputies ===
The number of elected deputies is 630. However, due to resignations, deaths or office incompatibilities, the number of deputies might be lower during the periods in which substitutes are picked (via parties lists or via by-elections).

- President: Roberto Fico (M5S), elected on 24 March 2018
- Vice Presidents: Maria Edera Spadoni (M5S), Ettore Rosato (PD, then IV), Fabio Rampelli (FdI), Mara Carfagna (FI) (until 15 February 2021)

Parliamentary groups in the Chamber of Deputies
Initial composition		Final composition			
Parliamentary group	Seats	Parliamentary group	Seats	Change	Notes
Five Star Movement	222	Five Star Movement	96	▼126	
League – Salvini for Premier	125	League – Salvini for Premier	131	▲6	
Democratic Party	111	Democratic Party	97	▼14	
Forza Italia – Berlusconi for President	104	Forza Italia – Berlusconi for President	68	▼36	
Brothers of Italy	32	Brothers of Italy	40	▲8	
		Together for the Future – Civic Commitment	48	▲48	
		Italia Viva – Italia C'è	32	▲32	
		Free and Equal – Article One – Italian Left	10	▲10	
Mixed	36	Mixed	107	▲71	
Linguistic Minorities	4	Linguistic Minorities	4	Steady	
Us with Italy	4	Us with Italy – USEI – Renaissance – ADC	5	▲1	
Free and Equal	14			▼14	
		Alternative	14	▲14	
		Vinciamo Italia – Italy in the Centre with Toti	10	▲10	
		Coraggio Italia	11	▲11	
		Action – +Europe – Italian Radicals	6	▲6	
		MAIE – PSI – Facciamo Eco	5	▲5	
		Democratic Centre	5	▲5	
		Green Europe – European Greens	5	▲5	
		Manifesta – Power to the People – Communist Refoundation Party – European Left	4	▲4	
Non inscrits	14	Non inscrits	38	▲24	
Total seats	630	Total seats	630	Steady	

=== Senate ===
In this legislature the number of elected Senators was 314, instead of the usual 315: in the Sicily constituency the total number of assigned seats to the M5S exceeded the number of candidates in the party's list. Including the six life senators, the total number of senators was therefore 320. On 31 July 2019, the Senate commission on elections finalized a decision about the missing seat in Sicily, assigning it to the M5S. The total number of senators is currently 321.

- President: Maria Elisabetta Alberti Casellati (FI), elected on 24 March 2018
- Vice Presidents: Roberto Calderoli (LSP), Ignazio La Russa (FdI), Paola Taverna (M5S), Anna Rossomando (PD)

Parliamentary groups in the Senate of the Republic
Initial composition		Current composition			
Parliamentary group	Seats	Parliamentary group	Seats	Change	Notes
Five Star Movement	109	Five Star Movement	62	▼47	
Forza Italia Berlusconi for President	61	Forza Italia Berlusconi for President – UDC	47	▼14	
League – Salvini for Premier	58	League – Salvini for Premier – Sardinian Action Party	61	▲3	
Democratic Party	52	Democratic Party	38	▼14	
Brothers of Italy	18	Brothers of Italy	21	▲3	
For the Autonomies	8	For the Autonomies	8	Steady	
		Italia Viva – PSI	15	▲15	
		United for the Constitution – C.A.L. (Constitution, Environment, Labour) – Alternativa – PC – Ancora Italia – Progetto SMART – IdV	13	▲13	
		Together for the Future – Democratic Centre	11	▲11	
Mixed	12	Mixed	42	▲30	
Free and Equal	4	Free and Equal – Eco-solidarity	6	▲2	
More Europe	1	+Europe – Action	4	▲3	
PSI – MAIE – USEI	3			▼3	
		Italia al centro (IdeA – Cambiamo!, Europeanists, Us of the Centre)	9	▲9	
		Italexit for Italy – Human Value Party	4	▲4	
		MAIE – Coraggio Italia	3	▲3	(Note: On 26 January 2021, all the senators from the Mixed–MAIE subgroup moved to the new group Europeanists–MAIE–CD. On 30 March 2021, after the dissolution of the Eur group, the MAIE senators (Adriano Cario and Ricardo Merlo) formed the Mixed–MAIE subgroup. On 22 November 2021, the Mixed–MAIE subgroup was dissolved. On 2 December 2021, the election of senator Adriano Cario was invalidated due to election fraud allegations. On the same day, senator Ricardo Antonio Merlo formed the Mixed–MAIE subgroup again.) (Note: On 26 January 2021, senator Andrea Causin left the FI group and joined the Europeanists group. On 30 March 2021, after the dissolution of the Eur group, he joined the Mixed group. On 23 December 2021, he joined the Mixed–I–C–EU–NdC subgroup. On 10 July 2022, he left the Mixed–IaC subgroup and joined the Mixed–MAIE–CI subgroup.) (Note: On 20 October 2020, senator Marinella Pacifico left the M5S group and joined the Mixed group. On 29 March 2021, she joined the Mixed–IeC subgroup. On 21 June 2022, she left the Mixed–IaC subgroup. On 11 July 2022, she joined the Mixed–MAIE–CI subgroup.)
		ManifestA – Power to the People – Communist Refoundation Party – European Left	2	▲2	(Note: On 20 July 2021, senator Matteo Mantero (former M5S) forms the Mixed–PaP subgroup.) (Note: On 29 June 2019, senator Paola Nugnes left the M5S group and joined the Mixed group. On 11 September 2019, she joined the Mixed–LeU group. On 29 April 2021, she left the Mixed–LeU subgroup. On 24 June 2022, she joined the Mixed–ManifestA subgroup.)
Non inscrits	4	Non inscrits	14	▲10	
Non-inscrit Life Senators	2	Non-inscrit Life Senators	2	Steady	
Total seats	320	Total seats	320	Steady	

== Main legislative acts ==
- Dignity decree (Italian: decreto dignità), approved on 7 August 2018. The bill imposed additional limits on the temporary employment contracts, issued fines on companies which received government aid and decide to relocate abroad, and banned advertising of gambling operators.
- Security decree (Italian: decreto sicurezza), or Salvini decree, approved on 28 November 2018. Strongly pushed by then Interior Minister Matteo Salvini, the bill involves measures regarding public safety and immigration. The new legislation abolished the status of humanitarian protection, extended the period of immigration detention in the Italian identification centres, increased funding for repatriation, extended the list of crimes that imply a nullification of refugee or protection status, and introduced the possibility of canceling the Italian citizenship acquired by a foreigner citizen in case they committed a terrorism-related crime.
- Anti-corruption decree (Italian: decreto anti-corruzione), also known as "Spazza-corrotti" (English: corruption-sweeper), approved on 18 December 2018. The decree increased the punishment and introduced a ban from public service for officers convicted for corruption, reformed the statute of limitations by expanding the time span for prescription, and included new rules for the regulation of political party funding.
- 2019 budget law (Italian: legge di bilancio 2019), approved on 30 December 2018. The bill introduced new taxes on web-based businesses and a strategy to drive up government revenues by selling public properties. The 2019 budget included a target deficit of 2.04% of the GDP, meeting the requests of the European Commission after a first proposal of 2.4%.
- Citizens' income and "quota 100" decree (Italian: decreto reddito di cittadinanza e quota 100), approved on 27 March 2019. The bill introduced a means-tested "citizens' income" to support poor families of up to 780 euros per month for a single unemployed person, and up to 1032 euros per month for a family. The bill also lowered the age of retirement based on the "100 quota": workers can retire when the sum of their age and their pension contribution years adds up to 100.
- Self-defense decree (Italian: decreto legittima difesa), approved on 28 March 2019. The bill introduced limitations to legal action against persons who attack an intruder, legitimating the self-defense also in case of "perceived" threat.
- Economic growth decree (Italian: decreto crescita), approved on 27 June 2019. After two consecutive quarters of negative national growth, the government passed a bill introducing various tax cuts and investment boosts.
- Security (no. 2) decree (Italian: decreto sicurezza – bis), approved on 5 August 2019. The bill covers mainly two topics: migrant rescue at sea, and public order management during demonstrations. The bill allowed the Interior Minister to limit or forbid the passage of ships in national waters for security and public-order reasons, and issued sanctions up to 1 million euros and possibly the seizure of the vessel against the ship captains who violate this law. Regarding public order management, the bill introduces harsher punishments for the usage of rockets, petards, sticks, bats, and helmets during demonstrations, and for the interruption of a public service.
- Constitutional law – Reduction of the number of MPs (Italian: legge costituzionale – riduzione del numero dei parlamentari), approved on 8 October 2019. The constitutional law reduces the size of the two houses of Parliament, from 630 to 400 in the Chamber of Deputies and from 315 to 200 in the Senate.
- Climate decree (Italian: decreto clima), approved on 10 December 2019. The bill is the first step of the government proposed "Green New Deal" plan; it introduced incentives for reducing the use of plastic packaging by shopkeepers, and incentives to car, moped or scooter drivers to use public transport in their cities.
- 2020 budget law (Italian: legge di bilancio 2020), approved on 24 December 2019. This budget law was the first of the Conte II cabinet, and introduced tax cuts and a crack-down on tax evasion. The budget keeps the Italian deficit for 2020 at 2.2% of the GDP, and introduced safeguard clauses in order to keep the 2021 deficit at 1.8%, like the previously planned target agreed with the European Commission.
- 2021 budget law (Italian: legge di bilancio 2021), approved on 23 December 2020. It introduced, among other things, new tax cuts and incentives to buy electric cars. The budget targets the fiscal deficit to fall to 7% of GDP in 2021.
- 2022 budget law (Italian: legge di bilancio 2022), approved on 30 December 2021. Among other things, it lowered the number of income tax bands from five to four, and replaced the "100 quota" with the "102 quota": workers can retire when the sum of their age and their pension contribution years adds up to 102 rather than to 100 like it was since 2019. The budget targets the fiscal deficit to fall to 5.6% of GDP in 2022.
- Constitutional law - Right to vote at age 18 in Senate elections (Italian: legge costituzionale - diritto al voto per i diciottenni al Senato), approved on 8 July 2021. This constitutional law modifies article 58 of the Italian Constitution, and lowers the minimum voting age for Senate elections from 25 to 18.

=== Legislation related to the COVID-19 pandemic ===
In order to counter the health, economic, and social effects of the COVID-19 pandemic, the Italian government enacted multiple legislative acts, usually of the type known as "decree of the President of the Council of ministers" (Italian: decreto del Presidente del Consiglio dei ministri) or DPCM. Most of these decrees were later approved by both houses of Parliament.

- COVID decree (Italian: decreto Covid), approved on 4 March 2020. This decree imposed a full lockdown in 10 comuni in Lombardy and one in Veneto; additionally, it imposed a partial lockdown in Lombardy, Veneto, Emilia-Romagna, and the provinces of Savona and Pesaro-Urbino.
- Cure Italy decree Italian: decreto Cura Italia, approved on 24 April 2020. This decree introduced measures to support the national health service and to enhance financial aid to businesses, workers, and families that were hit by the pandemic. The government allocated 25 billion euros to fund these measures.
- Relaunch decree (Italian: decreto rilancio), approved on 16 July 2020. This decree expanded and enhanced the measures taken in the previous "Cure Italy decree", with an allocated funding of additional 54.9 billion euros.
- Green pass decree (Italian: decreto green pass), approved on 15 September 2021. It introduced the requirement that a person show a EU Digital COVID Certificate in order to access certain venues, such as cafes, hospitals, restaurants and theatres. Subsequent amendments extended the requirement to cover all workplaces as well, and introduced fines for unvaccinated people older than 50. Most of the provisions contained in the decree ceased to have effect in June 2022.
