= Recognition of same-sex unions in Italy =

Italy has recognised civil unions since 5 June 2016, providing same-sex couples with almost all of the legal protections, benefits and rights of marriage. A bill to this effect was approved by the Senate on 25 February 2016 and by the Chamber of Deputies on 11 May. It was signed into law by President Sergio Mattarella on 20 May, published in the Gazzetta Ufficiale the next day and took effect on 5 June 2016. The law does not grant same-sex couples joint adoption rights or access to in vitro fertilisation. Before this, several regions had supported a national law on civil unions and some municipalities passed laws providing for civil unions, though the rights conferred by these unions varied from place to place.

Italy remains one of the last countries in Western Europe not to have legalized same-sex marriage. Polling suggests that a majority of Italians support the legal recognition of same-sex marriage.

== Civil unions ==
=== Background ===
In 1986, the Inter-Parliamentary Women's Communist group (Interparlamentare donne Comuniste) and Arcigay, Italy's largest LGBT rights organization, raised the issue of civil unions in the Italian Parliament for the first time. This was led by Ersilia Salvato in the Italian Senate and by Romano Bianchi and Angela Maria Bottari in the lower house who together attempted to introduce draft legislation. In 1988, following lobbying by Arcigay, lawyer and Socialist parliamentarian Alma Cappiello Agate introduced the first such bill to Parliament, calling for the acknowledgement of cohabitation between "persons". The bill failed, but Cappiello's proposal received wide coverage in the press. During the 1990s, a succession of civil union bills was regularly introduced and rejected in Parliament, bolstered by discussion in the European Parliament on equal rights for gays and lesbians. During the XIII Legislature from 1996 to 2001, at least ten bills were presented to Parliament, notably by Salvato, Nichi Vendola, Luigi Manconi, Graziano Cioni, and Luciana Sbarbati; however, none of them made it to a discussion on the floor of the Chamber of Deputies or the Senate.

In September 2003, the European Parliament approved a new resolution on human rights against discrimination on the basis of sexual orientation. Each member state had to confirm it would work to abolish any form of discrimination. During the XIV Legislature, proposals for civil unions with support from across party lines were submitted to Parliament. On 8 July 2002, Franco Grillini, an MP for the Democrats of the Left, submitted for the first time a bill to legalise same-sex marriage. However, the French civil solidarity pact (PACS) model was given particular resonance by the union of Alessio De Giorgi and Christian Pierre Panicucci on 21 October 2002 at the French embassy in Rome. On the same day, Grillini introduced a bill to the Chamber of Deputies to establish civil solidarity pacts in Italy. It ultimately failed, but was supported by 161 centre-left MPs. PACS remained a centrepiece in the public discourse on the rights of same-sex couples in Italy. This changed in 2005 when Spain's legalization of same-sex marriage received wide coverage in Italy and triggered extensive political discussions.

=== Failed attempts in 2006–2008 ===
During the 2006 electoral campaign, Romano Prodi, leader of The Union, promised to introduce legislation recognising cohabiting same-sex couples if elected. Prodi's centre-left coalition subsequently won a majority of seats in Parliament and was able to form the Prodi II Government. In February 2007, the government introduced a draft bill to recognise domestic partnerships under the name "Rights and duties of stable cohabitants" (DiCo; Diritti e doveri delle persone stabilmente conviventi). The bill faced considerable opposition from the Catholic Church, and in the Senate from the majority of the right-wing opposition, but also from certain elements within Prodi's fractious coalition. Delays meant the bill could not reach the floor for a conclusive vote. A demonstration was held in Rome on 10 March 2007 in support of the legislation. Thousands of activists waved alarm clocks in the air, signalling it was "high time" for such a law. Some government officials, including Minister for Equal Opportunities Barbara Pollastrini and Minister for Social Solidarity Paolo Ferrero, took part in the demonstration and were later criticized by Prodi for their participation. Two days later, the Episcopal Conference of Italy (CEI) staged a counter-demonstration, also in Rome. Police sources claimed that about 800,000 people participated in the demonstration, including some Catholic government ministers such as Clemente Mastella and Giuseppe Fioroni. On 16 June, the annual Rome pride parade hit a record attendance of about 1,000,000 demonstrators. The parade had a strong political flavour, as LGBT associations meant it to be a response to the opposition demonstrations.

The DiCo bill was merged with other civil union proposals in late 2007 and the Senate's Judiciary Committee began discussing a new draft bill to establish "Contract for Social Unions" (Contratto di Unione Solidale). Nevertheless, in February 2008, an early election was called, thus dissolving Parliament. All pending legislation died in committee. Two Italian filmmakers, Gustav Hofer and Luca Ragazzi, directed the award-winning documentary Suddenly, Last Winter (Improvvisamente l'inverno scorso) on the DiCo bill.

=== Developments in 2008–2015 ===
There was no majority in Parliament in favour of the legal recognition of same-sex unions following the 2008 general election. Although the governing majority, The People of Freedom and Lega Nord, of the new government under Silvio Berlusconi, was elected without promising any improvement for the rights of same-sex couples, some party members, including Minister for Innovation and Public Administration Renato Brunetta, along with Socialist MPs Lucio Barani and Francesco De Lucia, acted independently and submitted civil union legislation to the Parliament in September 2008. The proposed private member's bill, which was called "Mutual rights and duties for cohabiting partners" (DiDoRe; Diritti e Doveri di Reciprocità dei conviventi), was unsuccessful. If it had been adopted, it would have only been akin to unregistered cohabitation, as it did not provide for a public registry system. Following Berlusconi's resignation in 2011, a new government under Mario Monti was formed, but it also did not advance any legislation on same-sex relationships.

=== Local civil union registries ===
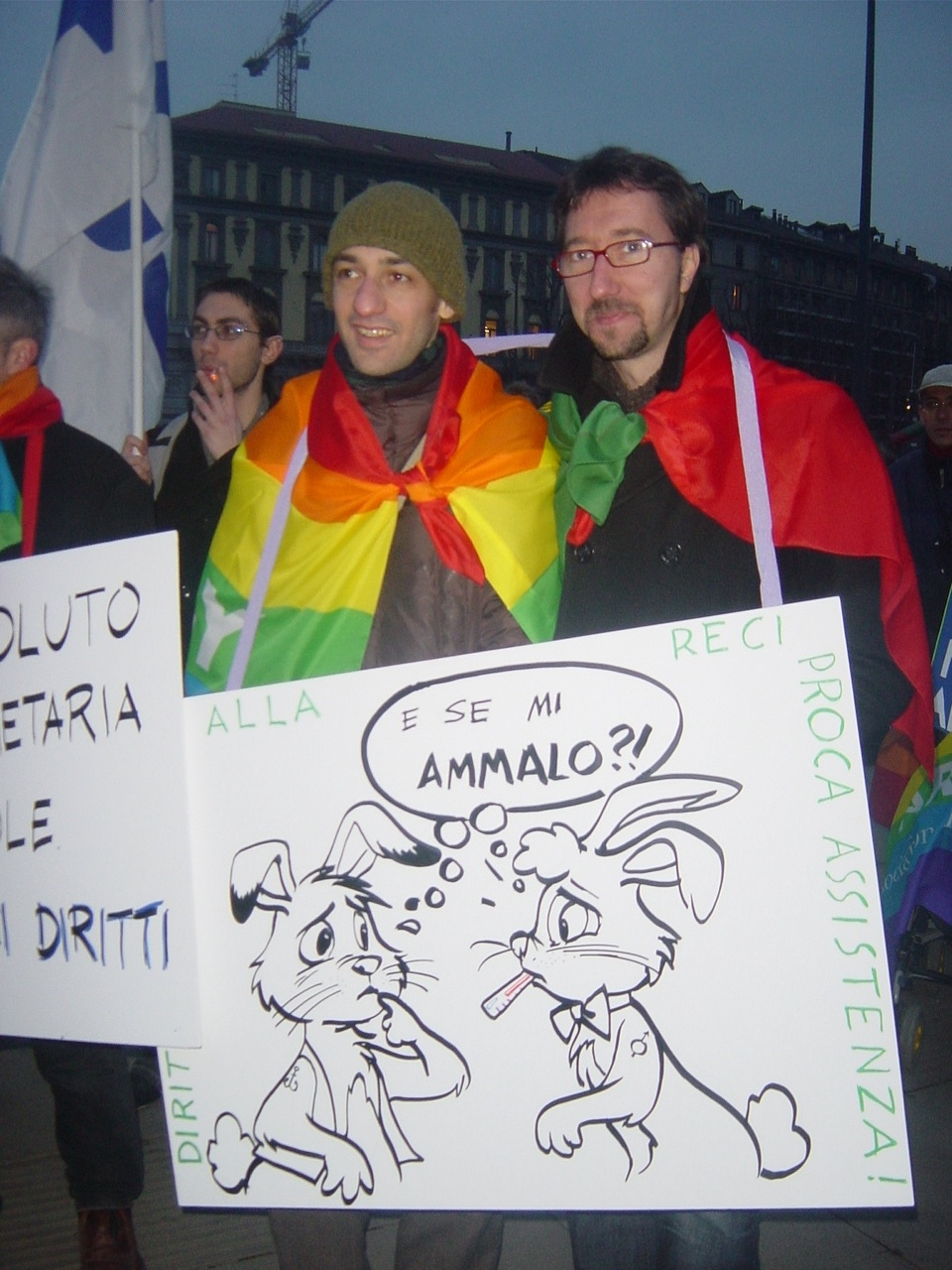
Demonstrators in favour of civil unions in Milan, February 2006

In July 2012, Mayor Giuliano Pisapia promised to introduce a formal registry for same-sex unions in Milan, which would be designed to afford some legal protections to cohabiting same-sex couples. However, these protections would not be equivalent to marriage rights. A spokesman for the Roman Catholic Archdiocese of Milan responded by arguing there was a "risk that giving equal status to families based on marriage with those founded on civil unions will legitimise polygamy". The City Council of Milan approved the registry on 27 July 2012 in a 29–7 vote. The City Council of Rome approved a similar registry in January 2015 in a 32–10 vote. The registry came into effect on 21 May 2015. Twenty couples registered their unions at Rome City Hall that day.

In January 2013, a hospital in Padua began using new parent bracelets using the gender-neutral term "parent" rather than "mother" or "father". In August 2013, a Venice city councillor proposed to replace the terms "mother" and "father" in local documents with the terms "parent 1" and "parent 2". The project ignited a debate in which Minister of Integration Cécile Kyenge intervened and praised the bid. The motion was later not pursued. A similar motion was approved in Bologna, replacing the terms "mother" and "father" with "parent" and "other parent" in local school documents.

On 4 March 2015, the Sicilian Regional Assembly voted 50–5 in favour of creating a regional civil union registry allowing couples of any sex to access regional government benefits. The law was strongly supported by President Rosario Crocetta. By early 2016, more than 320 municipalities had introduced civil union registries providing same-sex couples with formal recognition and equal access to municipal services as other cohabiting or married opposite-sex couples, the first being Empoli in 1993. Due to the limited number of services managed at the local level in Italy, these registries mostly have a symbolic value and are not legally binding for third parties. Major cities offering civil union registries include Rome, Milan, Bologna, Padua, Florence, Pisa, Bolzano, Palermo, Naples, Genoa, Bari, Catania, Brescia and Turin.

=== Passage of legislation in 2016 ===
Civil Union Law

Italian Parliament
- Long title: Regulation of civil unions between people of the same sex and of cohabitations
- Citation: Law No. 76 of 2016
- Enacted by: Senate of the Republic
- Enacted by: Chamber of Deputies
- Signed by: Sergio Mattarella
- Signed: 20 May 2016
- Commenced: 5 June 2016

Legislative history

Initiating chamber: Senate of the Republic
- Introduced by: Monica Cirinnà
- Passed: 25 February 2016
- Voting summary: 173 voted for; 71 voted against

Revising chamber: Chamber of Deputies
- Passed: 11 May 2016
- Voting summary: 372 voted for; 51 voted against; 99 abstained

Amends
- Italian Civil Code

Summary
- Introduces civil unions for same-sex couples and legally recognizes cohabitations for all couples
- Status: Current legislation

In July 2012, the Democratic Party (PD) approved a party platform supporting the legal recognition of same-sex unions. The secular wing of the party tried to pass a motion in favour of same-sex marriage, but this did not gather enough support from party members. Beppe Grillo, leader of the Five Star Movement, criticised the decision and spoke out in favour of marriage for same-sex couples.

Following the 2013 Italian general election, the Letta Government was formed by members from the Democratic Party, The People of Freedom (PdL) and Civic Choice (SC). Only the Democratic Party and Left Ecology Freedom (SEL) had pledged their support for same-sex union recognition during the political campaign. On 14 May 2013, the Italian Parliament extended healthcare benefits to MPs' same-sex partners. This rule had already been in effect for heterosexual partners for several decades. The same month, an Italian judge registered a British civil partnership contracted by two Italian men. The registration occurred in Milan and the couple was registered in the local civil union registry approved in 2012. The Minister of Equal Opportunities, Sport and Youth Policies, Josefa Idem (PD), later announced she would introduce a parliamentary bill to recognise same-sex unions. In June, the Senate's Justice Committee began examining several bills concerning the recognition of same-sex couples. Three bills would have allowed same-sex couples to marry, while three other bills would allow cohabiting couples to register their partnerships.

On 15 December 2013, the newly-elected secretary of the Democratic Party, Matteo Renzi, announced that the party would work on the recognition of same-sex relationships. While campaigning during the party primary elections, Renzi referred to the German registered life partnerships as a model for legislation in Italy. German partnerships were only open to same-sex couples, and by 2013 their scope had expanded to be almost equivalent to marriage, except in name and full adoption rights. After Enrico Letta's resignation in February 2014, Renzi was appointed prime minister and formed a new government on 22 February 2014. Leading Italian politicians, including the mayors of Rome, Milan and Bologna, Ignazio Marino, Giuliano Pisapia and Virginio Merola, pressed for such legislation to be urgently passed. In Autumn 2014, the government tabled a bill for debate in Parliament. The bill was reviewed by the Senate's Justice Committee but was delayed several times due to filibustering from the New Centre-Right. The bill would have guaranteed same-sex couples almost all of the rights and benefits reserved for marriage, including the ability to adopt a partner's child (i.e. stepchild adoption). It was supported by a large majority in Parliament: the Democratic Party, the Five Star Movement, some members of Forza Italia, and Left Ecology Freedom. Some MPs opposed stepchild adoption, while others called for same-sex marriage.

On 10 June 2015, the Chamber of Deputies passed a motion formally supporting the introduction of civil unions for same-sex couples. All major parties presented different motions, but all were rejected except for the motion proposed by the Democratic Party. On 21 July 2015, the European Court of Human Rights ruled in the case of Oliari and Others v. Italy that Italy violated Article 8 of the European Convention on Human Rights by not recognising same-sex couples' right to family life. On 6 October 2015, a proposal merging several previous bills and establishing same-sex civil unions (Italian: unione civile, pronounced [uˈnjoːne tʃiˈviːle]) (Note: In some regional languages of Italy: Albanian: unjunë çivile, pronounced [uˈnjunɯ tʃiˈvile]; Catalan: unió civil, pronounced [uniˈo siˈvil]; Cimbrian: léban-partnaschafft; Corsican: unione civile, pronounced [uˈnjone tʃiˈvile]; Croatian: građanska zajednica, pronounced [ɡrâdʑanskaː zâ.jednitsa]; Emilian-Romagnol: ugnòṅ sivìl, pronounced [uˈɲɔːŋ siˈvil]; Franco-Provençal: unión sevila, pronounced [yˈɲɔ̃ sɛˈvila]; French: union civile, pronounced [ynjɔ̃ sivil]; Friulian: union civîl, pronounced [uˈnjoŋ tʃiˈviːl]; German: eingetragene Lebenspartnerschaft, pronounced [ˈaɪ̯nɡɛˌtraːɡɛnɛ ˈleːbm̩sˌpartnɐʃaft]; Greek: αστική ένωση, astikí énosi, pronounced [astiˈci ˈenosi]; Ladin: union zivila, pronounced [uˈnjoŋ tsiˈvila]; Ligurian: union çivile, pronounced [yˈnjuŋ siˈviːle]; Lombard: union civila, pronounced [yˈnjũː tʃiˈʋiːla]; Mòcheno: lemspartnerschòft; Neapolitan: aunione civile, pronounced [awˈnjoːnə ʃiˈviːlə]; Occitan: union civila, pronounced [yˈnju siˈvilɔ, -ˈβilɔ]; Piedmontese: union sivila, pronounced [yˈnjʊŋ siˈvila]; Sardinian: unione tzivile, pronounced [uˈnjɔnɛ tsiˈvilɛ]; Sicilian: unioni civili, pronounced [ʊˈnjɔːnɪ ʃɪˈviːlɪ]; Slovene: partnerska zveza, pronounced [ˈpàːɾtnɛɾska ˈzʋéːza]; Venetian: union çiviłe, pronounced [uˈnjoŋ θiˈviɰe]) and gender-neutral cohabitation agreements was submitted to the Italian Senate by Monica Cirinnà, MP for the ruling Democratic Party. The bill underwent its first reading in the Senate on 14 October 2015. Although Silvio Berlusconi, the leader of the opposition Forza Italia party, supported the bill and stepchild adoption, many MPs from his party criticised or opposed the bill. Stepchild adoption was the most contentious issue across party lines and was vehemently opposed by the New Centre-Right, a Christian Democratic party in the governing coalition whose votes were necessary to reach a majority in the Senate, where the government's majority was slim. After having failed to garner support in Parliament from enough opposition MPs, the government asked for a confidence vote on an amended version of the bill which did not contain the contentious provisions on stepchild adoption.

On 25 February 2016, the bill was approved by the Italian Senate in a 173–71 vote. The law provides same-sex couples with almost all of the rights of marriage with the exception of adoption rights and access to in vitro fertilisation. On 8 March, the Chamber of Deputies' Justice Committee began discussing the bill, and ultimately approved it on 20 April. The Chamber approved the bill on 11 May in a 372–51 vote with 99 abstentions. It was subsequently signed into law by President Sergio Mattarella on 20 May. The law was published in the Gazzetta Ufficiale on 21 May and took effect on 5 June 2016. On 21 July, the Italian Council of State approved a government decree creating civil union registries across the country, allowing the first civil unions to be registered. The first same-sex couple entered into a civil union in Castel San Pietro Terme, Emilia-Romagna on 24 July.

25 February 2016 vote in the Senate of the Republic
Parliamentary group	Voted for	Voted against	Abstained	Absent (Did not vote)
Democratic Party	108: Donatella Albano; Silvana Amati; Ignazio Angioni; Bruno Astorre; Maria Teresa Bertuzzi; Amedeo Bianco; Daniele Gaetano Borioli; Claudio Broglia; Filippo Bubbico; Massimo Caleo; Laura Cantini; Rosaria Capacchione; Valeria Cardinali; Vannino Chiti; Monica Cirinnà; Roberto Cociancich; Stefano Collina; Paolo Corsini; Giuseppe Cucca; Vincenzo Cuomo; Erica D'Adda; Gianpiero Dalla Zuanna; Emilia De Biasi; Mauro Del Barba; Rosa Maria Di Giorgi; Nerina Dirindin; Stefano Esposito; Camilla Fabbri; Laura Fasiolo; Emma Fattorini; Nicoletta Favero; Elena Ferrara; Marco Filippi; Rosanna Filippin; Anna Finocchiaro; Elena Fissore; Federico Fornaro; Maria Grazia Gatti; Francesco Giacobbe; Stefania Giannini; Nadia Ginetti; Miguel Gotor; Manuela Granaiola; Pietro Grasso; Maria Cecilia Guerra; Paolo Guerrieri Paleotti; Pietro Ichino; Josefa Idem; Silvio Lai; Linda Lanzillotta; Nicola Latorre; Stefano Lepri; Sergio Lo Giudice; Doris Lo Moro; Carlo Lucherini; Giuseppe Lumia; Patrizia Manassero; Alessandro Maran; Andrea Marcucci; Mauro Maria Marino; Claudio Martini; Donella Mattesini; Giuseppina Maturani; Claudio Micheloni; Maurizio Migliavacca; Marco Minniti; Franco Mirabelli; Mario Morgoni; Claudio Moscardelli; Massimo Mucchetti; Pamela Orrù; Venera Padua; Giorgio Pagliari; Annamaria Parente; Carlo Pegorer; Stefania Pezzopane; Leana Pignedoli; Roberta Pinotti; Luciano Pizzetti; Francesca Puglisi; Laura Puppato; Raffaele Ranucci; Lucrezia Ricchiuti; Gianluca Rossi; Francesco Russo; Roberto Ruta; Angelica Saggese; Gian Carlo Sangalli; Giorgio Santini; Francesco Scalia; Annalisa Silvestro; Pasquale Sollo; Lodovico Sonego; Maria Spilabotte; Ugo Sposetti; Gianluca Susta; Walter Tocci; Salvatore Tomaselli; Giorgio Tonini; Mario Tronti; Renato Turano; Stefano Vaccari; Mara Valdinosi; Daniele Valentini; Vito Vattuone; Francesco Verducci; Luigi Zanda; Magda Angela Zanoni	–	–	3: Felice Casson; Luigi Manconi; Sergio Zavoli
Forza Italia	–	34: Bruno Alicata; Bartolomeo Amidei; Francesco Aracri; Anna Maria Bernini; Stefano Bertacco; Bernabò Bocca; Giacomo Caliendo; Franco Cardiello; Franco Carraro; Remigio Ceroni; Antonio D'Alì; Domenico De Siano; Enzo Fasano; Claudio Fazzone; Emilio Floris; Maurizio Gasparri; Niccolò Ghedini; Vincenzo Gibiino; Francesco Maria Giro; Lucio Malan; Andrea Mandelli; Marco Marin; Altero Matteoli; Alfredo Messina; Augusto Minzolini; Nitto Francesco Palma; Paolo Pelino; Maria Rizzotti; Paolo Romani; Mariarosaria Rossi; Francesco Scoma; Giancarlo Serafini; Cosimo Sibilia; Sante Zuffada	–	6: Michele Boccardi; Paolo Galimberti; Giovanni Piccoli; Antonio Razzi; Salvatore Sciascia; Domenico Scilipoti
Five Star Movement	–	–	–	35: Alberto Airola; Ornella Bertorotta; Rosetta Enza Blundo; Laura Bottici; Maurizio Buccarella; Elisa Bulgarelli; Enrico Cappelletti; Gianluca Castaldi; Nunzia Catalfo; Lello Ciampolillo; Andrea Cioffi; Roberto Cotti; Vito Claudio Crimi; Daniela Donno; Giovanni Endrizzi; Elena Fattori; Luigi Gaetti; Mario Giarrusso; Gianni Pietro Girotto; Barbara Lezzi; Stefano Lucidi; Giovanna Mangili; Carlo Martelli; Bruno Marton; Michela Montevecchi; Vilma Moronese; Nicola Morra; Paolo Nugnes; Sara Paglini; Vito Petrocelli; Sergio Puglia; Vincenzo Santagelo; Marco Scibona; Manuela Serra; Paola Taverna
New Centre Right	26: Piero Aiello; Fabiola Anitori; Antonio Azzollini; Laura Bianconi; Giovanni Bilardi; Paolo Bonaiuti; Pier Ferdinando Casini; Massimo Cassano; Federica Chiavaroli; Francesco Colucci; Franco Conte; Mario Dalla Tor; Vincenzo D'Ascola; Antonio De Poli; Ulisse Di Giacomo; Antonio Gentile; Marcello Gualdani; Bruno Mancuso; Salvatore Margiotta; Luigi Marino; Pippo Pagano; Luciano Rossi; Renato Schifani; Salvatore Torrisi; Simona Vicari; Guide Viceconti	–	–	6: Gabriele Albertini; Aldo Di Biagio; Stefano Esposito; Roberto Formigoni; Giuseppe Marinello; Maurizio Sacconi
Mixed Group	5: Alessandra Bencini; Benedetto Della Vedova; Serenella Fucksia; Mario Monti; Maurizio Romani	10: Laura Bignami; Fabrizio Bocchino; Francesco Campanella; Massimo Cervellini; Peppe De Cristofaro; Loredana De Petris; Marino Mastrangeli; Maria Mussini; Alessia Petraglia; Maurizio Rossi	–	11: Giovanni Barozzino; Raffaela Bellot; Patrizia Bisinella; Cristina De Pietro; Corradino Mineo; Francesco Molinari; Emanuela Munerato; Ivana Simeone; Dario Stefano; Luciano Uras; Giuseppe Vacciano
For the Autonomies	12: Lorenzo Battista; Hans Berger; Enrico Buemi; Vittorio Fravezzi; Albert Laniece; Fausto Longo; Giorgio Napolitano; Andrea Olivero; Luis Alberto Orellana; Francesco Palermo; Lucio Romano; Karl Zeller	–	–	8: Elena Cattaneo; Carlo Azeglio Ciampi; Maria Paola Merloni; Riccardo Nencini; Franco Panizza; Renzo Piano; Carlo Rubbia; Claudio Zin
Liberal Popular Alliance	18: Francesco Maria Amoruso; Domenico Auricchio; Lucio Barani; Sandro Bondi; Giuseppe Compagnone; Riccardo Conti; Vincenzo D'Anna; Ciro Falanga; Adele Gambaro; Pietro Iurlaro; Pietro Langella; Eva Longo; Riccardo Mazzoni; Lionello Marco Pagnoncelli; Enrico Piccinelli; Manuela Repetti; Giuseppe Ruvolo; Denis Verdini	–	–	1: Antonio Scavone
Great Autonomies and Freedom	4: Michelino Davico; Angela D'Onghia; Paolo Naccarato; Riccardo Villari	9: Andrea Augello; Antonio Caridi; Monica Casaletto; Paola De Pin; Mario Ferrara; Carlo Giovanardi; Giovanni Mauro; Mario Mauro; Gaetano Quagliariello	–	2: Bartolomeo Pepe; Giulio Tremonti
Lega Nord	–	9: Roberto Calderoli; Stefano Candiani; Gian Marco Centinaio; Silvana Comaroli; Nunziante Consiglio; Jonny Crosio; Erika Stefani; Paolo Tosato; Raffaele Volpi	–	3: Paolo Arrigoni; Sergio Divina; Giacomo Stucchi
Conservatives and Reformists	–	9: Anna Cinzia Bonfrisco; Francesco Bruni; Luigi D'Ambrosio Lettieri; Salvatore Di Maggio; Pietro Liuzzi; Antonio Milo; Luigi Perrone; Lucio Tarquinio; Vittorio Zizza	–	1: Luigi Compagna
Total	173	71	0	76
Total	54.1%	22.2%	0.0%	23.8%

11 May 2016 vote in the Chamber of Deputies
Parliamentary group	Voted for	Voted against	Abstained	Absent (Did not vote)
Democratic Party	278: Luciano Agostini; Roberta Agostini; Ferdinando Aiello; Luisella Albanella; Tea Albini; Maria Amato; Sesa Amici; Sofia Amoddio; Maria Antezza; Michele Anzaldi; Ileana Argentin; Tiziano Arlotti; Anna Ascani; Sebastiano Barbanti; Cristina Bargero; Davide Baruffi; Lorenzo Basso; Alfredo Bazoli; Lorenzo Becattini; Gianluca Benamati; Paolo Beni; Marco Bergonzi; Marina Berlinghieri; Giuseppe Berretta; Mariastella Bianchi; Rosy Bindi; Caterina Bini; Franca Biondelli; Tamara Blazina; Sergio Boccadutri; Gianpieri Bocci; Francesco Boccia; Antonio Boccuzzi; Paola Boldrini; Paolo Bolognesi; Lorenza Bonaccorsi; Francesco Bonifazi; Francesca Bonomo; Michele Bordo; Enrico Borghi; Ilaria Borletti Buitoni; Maria Elena Boschi; Luisa Bossa; Chiara Braga; Paola Bragantini; Giorgio Brandolin; Alessandro Bratti; Enza Bruno Bossio; Giovanni Burtone; Vanessa Camani; Micaela Campana; Emanuele Cani; Angelo Capodicasa; Salvatore Capone; Sabrina Capozzolo; Ernesto Carbone; Daniela Cardinale; Renzo Carella; Anna Maria Carloni; Elena Carnevali; Mara Carocci; Marco Carra; Piergiorgio Carrescia; Maria Chiara Carrozza; Floriana Casellato; Franco Cassano; Antonio Castricone; Marco Causi; Susanna Cenni; Khalid Chaouki; Eleonora Cimbro; Laura Coccia; Matteo Colaninno; Miriam Cominelli; Paolo Coppola; Maria Coscia; Paolo Cova; Stefania Covello; Filippo Crimì; Diego Crivellari; Gianni Cuperlo; Tommaso Currò; Luigi Dallai; Gian Pietro Dal Moro; Cesare Damiano; Vincenzo D'Arienzo; Carlo Dell'Aringa; Andrea De Maria; Roger De Menech; Paola De Micheli; Marco Di Maio; Vittoria D'Incecco; Titti Di Salvo; Marco Di Stefano; Marco Donati; Umberto D'Ottavio; Guglielmo Epifani; David Ermini; Marilena Fabbri; Giovanni Falcone; Luigi Famiglietti; Edoardo Fanucci; Davide Faraone; Gianni Farina; Marco Fedi; Donatella Ferranti; Alan Ferrari; Andrea Ferro; Emauele Fiano; Massimo Fiorio; Cinzia Maria Fontana; Paolo Fontanelli; Filippo Fossati; Gian Mario Fragomeli; Dario Franceschini; Silvia Fregolent; Gianluca Fusilli; Maria Chiara Gadda; Giampaolo Galii; Guido Galperti; Paolo Gandolfi; Laura Garavini; Francesco Saverio Garofani; Daniela Gasparini; Federico Gelli; Manuela Ghizzoni; Roberto Giachetti; Anna Giacobbe; Antonello Giacomelli; Federico Ginati; Dario Ginefra; Tommaso Ginoble; Andrea Giorgis; Gregorio Gitti; Fabrizia Giuliani; Giampiero Giulietti; Luisa Gnecchi; Gero Grassi; Maria Gaetana Greco; Chiara Gribaudo; Giuseppe Guerini; Lorenzo Guerini; Mauro Guerra; Maria Iacono; Tino Ianuzzi; Leonardo Impegno; Antonella Incerti; Vanna Iori; Luigi Lacquaniti; Francesco Laforgia; Francesca La Marca; Enzo Lattuca; Giuseppe Lauricella; Fabio Lavagno; Donata Lenzi; Danilo Leva; Emanuele Lodolini; Luca Lotti; Maria Anna Madia; Patrizia Maestri; Ernesto Magorno; Gianna Malisani; Simona Malpezzi; Andrea Manciulli; Massimilianno Manfredi; Irene Manzi; Daniele Marantelli; Marco Marchetti; Maino Marchi; Raffaella Mariani; Elisa Mariano; Siro Marrocu; Umberto Marroni; Andrea Martella; Pierdomenico Martino; Federico Massa; Davide Mattielo; Matteo Mauri; Alessandro Mazzoli; Fabio Melilli; Marco Meloni; Michele Pompeo Meta; Marco Miccoli; Gennaro Migliore; Emiliano Minnucci; Anna Margherita Miotto; Antonio Misiani; Michele Mognato; Francesco Monaco; Colomba Mongiello; Daniele Montroni; Alessia Morani; Roberto Morassut; Sara Moretto; Antonino Moscatt; Romina Mura; Delia Murer; Alessandro Naccarato; Martina Nardi; Giulia Narduolo; Michele Nicoletti; Nicodemo Oliverio; Matteo Orfini; Alberto Pagani; Giovanna Palma; Valentina Paris; Dario Parrini; Edoardo Patriarca; Michele Pelillo; Vinicio Peluffo; Caterina Pes; Paolo Petrini; Ileana Piazzoni; Flavia Piccoli Nardelli; Giorgio Piccolo; Salvatore Piccolo; Nazzareno Pilozzi; Giuditta Pini; Paola Pinna; Barbara Pollastrini; Fabio Porta; Giacomo Portas; Francesco Prina; Lia Quartapelle; Fausto Raciti; Michele Ragosta; Roberto Rampi; Ermete Realacci; Franco Ribaudo; Matteo Richetti; Andrea Rigoni; Maria Grazia Rocchi; Giuseppe Romanini; Andrea Romano; Ettore Rosato; Paolo Rossi; Anna Rossomando; Michela Rostan; Gessica Rostellato; Alessia Rotta; Simonetta Rubinato; Angelo Rughetti; Giovanni Sanga; Luca Sani; Francesco Sanna; Giovanna Sanna; Daniela Sbrollini; Ivan Scalfarotto; Gea Schirò; Chiara Scuvera; Marina Sereni; Camilla Sgambato; Elisa Simoni; Roberto Speranza; Nico Stumpo; Alessio Tacconi; Luigi Taranto; Giacomino Taricco; Assunta Tartaglione; Veronica Tentori; Alessandra Terrosi; Marietta Tidei; Irene Tinagli; Mario Tullo; Valeria Valente; Simone Valiante; Franco Vazio; Silvia Velo; Laura Venittelli; Liliana Ventricelli; Walter Verini; Ludovico Vico; Sandra Zampa; Alessandro Zan; Giorgio Zanin; Giuseppe Zappulla; Diego Zardini; Davide Zoggia	–	1: Demetrio Battaglia	22: Vincenzo Amendola; Pier Paolo Baretta; Teresa Bellanova; Pier Luigi Bersani; Luigi Bobba; Gianclaudio Bressa; Ezio Casati; Bruno Censore; Magda Culotta; Antonio Cuomo; Umberto Del Basso De Caro; Giuseppe Fioroni; Paolo Gentiloni; Sandro Gozi; Yoram Gutgeld; Alberto Losacco; Andrea Orlando; Teresa Piccione; Ernesto Preziosi; Gian Piero Scanu; Angelo Senaldi; Rosa Maria Villecco
Five Star Movement	–	–	78: Donatella Agostinelli; Ferdinando Alberti; Massimo Enrico Baroni; Tatiana Basilio; Sergio Battelli; Silvia Benedetti; Massimiliano Bernini; Paolo Bernini; Nicola Bianchi; Alfonso Bonafede; Giuseppe Brescia; Marco Brugnerotto; Mirko Busto; Francesco Cariello; Paola Carinelli; Vincenzo Caso; Laura Castelli; Andrea Cecconi; Silvia Chimienti; Tiziana Ciprini; Andrea Colletti; Vega Colonnese; Claudio Cominardi; Emanuela Corda; Emanuele Cozzolino; Davide Crippa; Fabiana Dadone; Federica Daga; Giuseppe D'Ambrosio; Marco Da Villa; Daniele Del Grosso; Ivan Della Valle; Diego De Lorenzis; Massimo De Rosa; Alessandro Di Battista; Federica Dieni; Federico D'Incà; Manlio Di Stefano; Giulia Di Vita; Francesco D'Uva; Mattia Fantinati; Vittorio Ferraresi; Riccardo Fraccaro; Luca Frusone; Filippo Gallinella; Luigi Gallo; Silvia Giordano; Marta Grande; Giulia Grillo; Giuseppe L'Abbate; Mirella Liuzzi; Roberta Lombardi; Marialucia Lorefice; Loredana Lupo; Claudia Mannino; Matteo Mantero; Maria Marzana; Salvatore Micillo; Dalila Nesci; Riccardo Nuti; Daniele Pesco; Cosimo Petraroli; Gianluca Rizzo; Paolo Romano; Carla Ruocco; Giulia Sarti; Carlo Sibilia; Giorgio Girgis Sorial; Arianna Spessotto; Patrizia Terzoni; Danilo Toninelli; Davide Tripiedi; Gianluca Vacca; Simone Valente; Andrea Vallascas; Stefano Vignaroli; Alessio Villarosa; Alberto Zolezzi	13: Francesca Businarolo; Azzurra Cancelleri; Matteo Dall'Osso; Michele Dell'Orco; Chiara Di Benedetto; Luigi Di Maio; Roberto Fico; Chiara Gagnarli; Paolo Parentela; Girolamo Pisano; Emanuele Scagliusi; Maria Edera Spadoni; Angelo Tofalo
Mixed Group	28: Ignazio Abrignani; Daniel Alfreider; Maurizio Bianconi; Mario Borghese; Franco Bruno; Renata Bueno; Daniele Capezzone; Ivan Catalano; Luca D'Alessandro; Lello Di Gioia; Marco Di Lello; Monica Faenzi; Nello Formisano; Alessandro Furnari; Renate Gebhard; Vincenza Labriola; Pia Locatelli; Marco Marcolin; Michela Marzano; Giovanni Mottola; Mara Mucci; Mauro Ottobre; Massimo Parisi; Oreste Pastorelli; Pino Pisicchio; Albrecht Plangger; Aris Prodani; Francesco Saverio Romano	11: Matteo Bragantini; Gianfranco Giovanni Chiarelli; Nicola Ciracì; Antonio Distaso; Cosimo Latronico; Rudi Marguerettaz; Roberto Marti; Rocco Palese; Mauro Pili; Emanuele Prataviera; Eugenia Roccella	13: Trifone Altieri; Massimo Artini; Marco Baldassarre; Eleonora Bechis; Beatrice Brignone; Giuseppe Civati; Cristian Iannuzzi; Carmelo Lo Monte; Toni Matarrelli; Luca Pastorino; Stefano Quintarelli; Samuele Segoni; Tancredi Turco	10: Roberto Caon; Massimo Corsaro; Benedetto Fucci; Giuseppe Galati; Patrizia Maestri; Ricardo Merlo; Edoardo Nesi; Vincenzo Piso; Manfred Schullian; Guglielmo Vaccaro
Forza Italia	10: Mara Carfagna; Elena Centemero; Nunzia De Girolamo; Giorgio Lainati; Lorena Milanato; Elio Massimo Palmizio; Renata Polverini; Stefania Prestigiacomo; Laura Ravetto; Elio Vito	21: Sandro Biosotti; Renato Brunetta; Francesco Catanoso; Rocco Crimi; Fabrizio Di Stefano; Gregorio Fontana; Daniela Santanchè; Sestino Giacomoni; Alberto Giorgetti; Pietro Laffranco; Piero Longo; Roberto Occhiuto; Antonio Palmieri; Catia Polidori; Carlo Sarro; Sandra Savino; Dino Secco; Francesco Paolo Sisto; Luca Squeri; Valentino Valentini; Paolo Vella	2: Simone Baldelli; Gabriela Giammanco	20: Antonio Angelucci; Bruno Archi; Deborah Bergamini; Michaela Biancofiore; Michela Vittoria Brambilla; Annagrazia Calabria; Giuseppina Castiello; Luigi Cesaro; Riccardo Gallo; Mariastella Gelmini; Francantonio Genovese; Maria Tindara Gullo; Marco Martinelli; Antonio Martino; Settimo Nizzi; Giuseppe Romele; Gianfranco Rotondi; Paolo Russo; Jole Santelli; Elvira Savino
New Centre Right	11: Antonino Bosco; Rocco Buttiglione; Raffaele Calabrò; Fabrizio Cicchitto; Enrico Costa; Maurizio Lupi; Antonio Marotta; Antonino Minardo; Sergio Pizzolante; Rosanna Scopelliti; Raffaello Vignali	3: Paola Binetti; Angelo Cera; Alessandro Pagano	1: Giuseppe De Mita	16: Ferdinando Adornato; Angelino Alfano; Gioacchino Alfano; Paolo Alli; Maurizio Bernardo; Dorina Bianchi; Luigi Casero; Giuseppe Castiglione; Andrea Causin; Gianpiero D'Alia; Vincenzo Garofalo; Beatrice Lorenzin; Dore Misuraca; Filippo Piccone; Gianfranco Sammarco; Paolo Tancredi
Left Ecology Freedom – Possible	27: Giorgio Airaudo; Franco Bordo; Celestina Costantino; Alfredo D'Attorre; Donatella Duranti; Daniele Farina; Claudio Fava; Vincenzo Folino; Nicola Fratoianni; Carlo Galli; Giancarlo Giordano; Monica Gregori; Florian Kronbichler; Giulio Marcon; Giovanna Martelli; Gianni Melilla; Marisa Nicchi; Marisa Nicchi; Erasmo Palazzotto; Annalisa Pannarale; Serena Pellegrino; Michele Piras; Antonio Placido; Stefano Quaranta; Lara Ricciatti; Arturo Scotto; Adriano Zaccagnini	–	–	4: Stefano Fassina; Francesco Ferrara; Arcangelo Sannicandro; Filiberto Zaratti
Civic Choice	14: Alberto Bombassei; Ilaria Capua; Angelo Antonio D'Agostino; Adriana Galgano; Gianfranco Librandi; Salvatore Matarrese; Andrea Mazziotti di Celso; Bruno Molea; Giovanni Monchiero; Roberta Oliaro; Giovanni Palladino; Mariano Rabino; Pierpaolo Vargiu; Valentina Vezzali	–	–	6: Mario Catania; Antimo Cesaro; Stefano Dambruoso; Giulio Sottanelli; Andrea Vecchio; Enrico Zanetti
Lega Nord	–	13: Stefano Allasia; Stefano Borghesi; Umberto Bossi; Filippo Busin; Davide Caparini; Massimiliano Fedriga; Giancarlo Giorgetti; Guido Guidesi; Cristian Invernizzi; Nicola Molteni; Marco Rondini; Barbara Saltamartini; Roberto Simonetti	–	4: Angelo Attaguile; Paolo Grimoldi; Guglielmo Picchi; Gianluca Pini
Solidary Democracy – Democratic Centre	4: Roberto Capelli; Mario Marazziti; Milena Santerini; Bruno Tabacci	2: Gian Luigi Gigli; Mario Sberna	4: Maurizio Baradello; Lorenzo Dellai; Federico Fauttilli; Gaetano Piepoli	3: Mario Caruso; Fucsia Nissoli; Domenico Rossi
Brothers of Italy	–	1: Fabio Rampelli	–	9: Edmondo Cirielli; Ignazio La Russa; Pasquale Maietta; Giorgia Meloni; Gaetano Nastri; Giovanna Petrenga; Walter Rizzetto; Marcello Taglialatela; Achille Totaro
Total (Note: The Chamber of Deputies has 629 voting members. The President of the Chamber of Deputies, Laura Boldrini, votes only in case of a tied vote.)	372	51	99	107
Total	59.1%	8.1%	15.7%	17.0%

=== Statistics ===
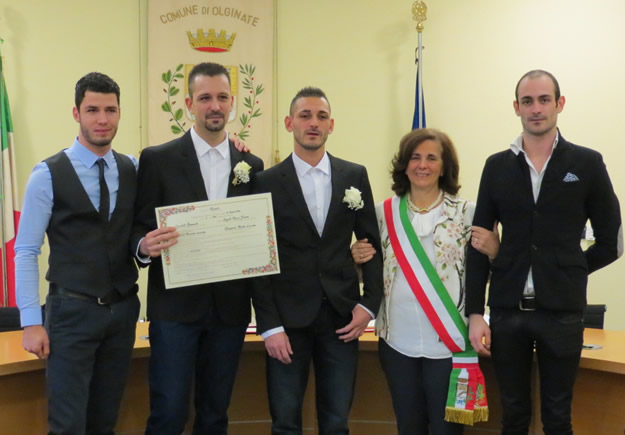
A couple showing their civil union license in Olginate, October 2016

12 same-sex civil unions had been performed in Italy by August 2016. No civil unions had taken place in Rome by then; the first civil union in Rome was performed on 17 September 2016. By 2023, 21,336 civil unions had taken place in Italy, mostly in Lombardy, Lazio, Emilia-Romagna, Piedmont and Tuscany.

Number of civil unions registered in Italy
Region	2016	2017	2018	2019	2020	2021	2022	2023	Total
Abruzzo	22	39	24	30	22	22	30	28	217
Aosta Valley	4	12	7	6	2	2	6	6	45
Apulia	46	108	74	73	58	79	95	135	668
Basilicata	2	10	3	7	1	6	6	10	45
Calabria	6	17	6	9	3	16	17	19	93
Campania	89	168	103	91	62	111	137	144	905
Emilia-Romagna	231	439	280	213	153	218	278	315	2,127
Friuli-Venezia Giulia	34	79	42	32	18	26	47	40	318
Lazio	275	767	425	352	257	297	386	401	3,160
Liguria	119	134	89	82	49	75	114	67	729
Lombardy	595	1,073	701	562	362	468	640	708	5,109
Marche	49	57	39	32	25	46	58	48	354
Molise	1	3	2	7	2	2	3	3	23
Piedmont	251	417	248	220	126	196	244	292	1,994
Sardinia	35	70	48	46	20	36	60	67	382
Sicily	70	122	128	94	71	107	117	163	872
Trentino-Alto Adige/Südtirol	43	89	39	32	29	43	49	49	383
Tuscany	246	405	264	201	144	207	260	247	1,974
Umbria	35	48	37	29	21	35	37	37	279
Veneto	183	319	249	179	114	156	229	240	1,669
Total	2,336	4,376	2,808	2,297	1,539	2,148	2,813	3,019	21,336

== Same-sex marriage ==
Laws regarding same-sex partnerships in Europe¹ Marriage Civil union Limited domestic recognition (cohabitation) Unrecognized Constitution limits marriage to opposite-sex couples ¹ May include recent laws or court decisions that have not yet entered into effect.

=== Background ===
Bills legalising same-sex marriage have been submitted to the Italian Parliament several times since Franco Grillini, an MP for the Democrats of the Left, first presented a proposal to the Chamber of Deputies in July 2002. It would take 10 more years before a party represented in Parliament made same-sex marriage part of their party policy goals. In May 2012, Antonio Di Pietro, political leader of the Italy of Values party, said, "Our party has been the first in Italy to follow US President Barack Obama. We invite other Italian parties to support gay marriage. You don't have to be shy, you have to say yes". In July 2012, he submitted a same-sex marriage bill to the Chamber of Deputies, but it was never debated by Parliament. Following the 2013 general election, several bills were presented to Parliament, with some also granting full adoption rights and automatic recognition of the spouse's children. However, none of these bills advanced to the committee stage. As parliamentary discussions focused on the recognition of cohabitation agreements and registered partnerships for same-sex couples, debate on same-sex marriage was relatively limited until passage of civil union legislation in 2016. However, the topic was far from absent from public discourse. It has been a demand of the Italian LGBT movement since at least the early 2000s and the subject of several judicial cases involving recognition of same-sex marriages performed abroad.

=== Developments in 2016–present ===
In the 2018 general election, the only party to achieve parliamentary representation that was actively campaigning for same-sex marriage was Free and Equal, which won 14 seats in the Chamber of Deputies and 4 in the Senate. Two bills legalizing same-sex marriage were submitted by Senator Monica Cirinnà of the Democratic Party and Senator Alessandra Maiorino of the Five Star Movement in March and May 2018, but neither advanced beyond the committee stage in Parliament. Following the 2022 general election, same-sex marriage became a prominent issue in Italian politics for the first time, with the Five Star Movement, the Democratic Party, the Greens and Left Alliance and More Europe all endorsing same-sex marriage and full adoption rights in their electoral platforms (although the Democratic Party did not take an official stance on adoption). However, these parties lack a majority of parliamentary seats. Three bills were presented to the Senate by senators Maiorino, Simona Malpezzi, and Ivan Scalfarotto in 2022, and two bills to the Chamber of Deputies by MPs Marco Grimaldi and Chiara Appendino in October and November 2022. On 27 December 2022, Senator Maiorino's bill advanced to the committee stage but has yet to be reviewed by the Senate's Justice Committee.

On 26 February 2023, Elly Schlein won the primary elections of the Democratic Party on a campaign platform advocating for same-sex marriage and full adoption rights. A petition calling for a popular referendum on the legalisation of same-sex marriage was launched on the official website of the Ministry of Justice on 5 May 2025 by Volt Italy. The petition ultimately gathered 361,505 of the required 500,000 signatures, falling short of the threshold before the 3 August deadline. The petition would have abolished the distinctions between civil unions and civil marriages. However, it was criticized by various organizations, including Arcigay, which argued that the referendum would "not [have] be[en] enough" to legalize same-sex marriage in Italy. Indeed, the petition would have only repealed parts of the civil union law; it would not have modified the Civil Code, which governs marriage. The co-president of Volt Europa, Francesca Romana D'Antuono, said that "with this referendum, marriage cannot be established for homosexual couples, but de facto equality can be created".

=== Recognition of marriages performed abroad ===
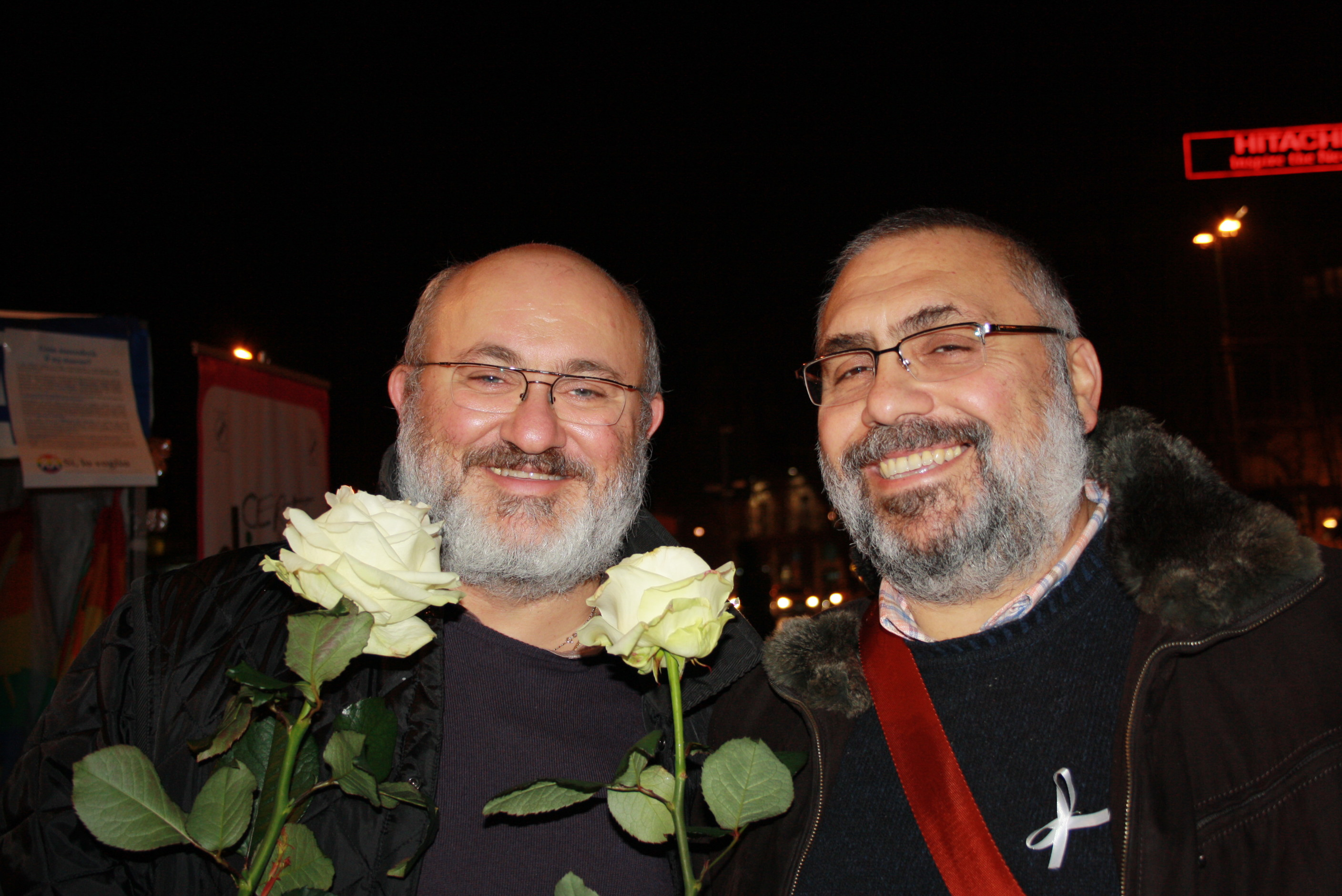
A same-sex couple at a rally for equal marriage, Milan, 2010

On 9 April 2014, a court in Grosseto ordered that a same-sex marriage contracted abroad be recognised in the municipality. However, the order was later voided by the Florence Court of Appeal. Grosseto was followed by several cities in recognising same-sex marriages validly performed abroad, including the cities of Bologna, Naples and Fano in July 2014, Empoli, Pordenone, Udine and Trieste in September 2014, and Florence, Piombino, Milan, Rome and Livorno in October 2014. In October 2014, Minister of the Interior Angelino Alfano ordered all prefects to invalidate any registration of same-sex marriages performed abroad, arguing that the Italian Civil Code made no mention of same-sex marriage and any attempt to recognise one was therefore illegal. The legal system had already been used to stop some mayors from recognising same-sex unions, but many such cases were ultimately dismissed by the courts after failing to determine a particular offence. Indeed, a public prosecutor in Udine had ruled that a prefect could not invalidate marriages registered by municipal mayors. On 9 March 2015, the Lazio Regional Administrative Court suspended Alfano's order because only civil courts could annul the registration of same-sex marriages contracted abroad. However, the court also found that overseas marriages could not be recognized in Italy because of the lack of domestic legislation. Alfano subsequently appealed the case to the Council of State, Italy's highest administrative court. In October 2015, the court reversed the judgement, ruling that it was within the role of prefectures to ensure that all public acts are legal, and thus that same-sex marriages contracted abroad could not be recognised in Italy. Activists complained that Carlo Deodato, the Council of State judge who drafted the sentence, defined himself as "Catholic, married and father of two" and had previously expressed his disapproval of same-sex marriage via Twitter and therefore could not be considered impartial. They promised to take an appeal to the European Court of Human Rights (ECHR) if necessary.

On 31 January 2017, the Italian Constitutional Court ruled that a same-sex marriage conducted between two women in France must be recognized in Italy. The court refused to hear the case of the mayor of Santo Stefano del Sole, who had appealed an earlier sentence passed down from the Naples Court of Appeal that the marriage be officially recognized. One of two women had the right to claim Italian citizenship jus sanguinis. Thus, refusal to recognize the union was seen as being in direct violation of the Charter of Fundamental Rights of the European Union, of the fundamental rights of European citizens, and of the right of free movement for citizens throughout the member states. On 14 December 2017, the European Court of Human Rights ruled that Italy's refusal to legally recognise the marriages of same-sex couples contracted abroad violated the couples' rights to private and family life. The six plaintiff couples in this case, three of whom had married in Canada, two in the Netherlands and one in California, sought to have their marriages registered in Italy but officials had refused, citing a 2001 order by the Ministry of Internal Affairs that same-sex marriage was "contrary to the norms of public order". The court also ordered Italy to pay monetary compensation to the couples.

In May 2018, the Supreme Court of Cassation ruled that same-sex unions performed abroad had to be recognised as civil unions, regardless of whether the couples married before or after Italy introduced civil unions in 2016. The ruling was the final judgement on an appeal lodged by an Italian-Brazilian couple who had married in Brazil in 2012, and then performed another ceremony in Portugal in 2013. The couple sought to have their marriage recognized under Italian law but were denied, prompting them to mount a legal challenge. The judges agreed with an earlier appellate court ruling on the case, which stated that Italian law would recognise married same-sex couples only as civil unions. The couple argued that the move constituted discriminatory "downgrading" of their relationship status. The Court of Cassation, however, judged that civil unions provide most of the same legal protections as marriages, and therefore could not be considered discrimination. "Same-sex marriage does not correspond to the model of matrimony outlined in our legal system," the judges stated, ruling that Italy may legitimately use its "legislative discretion" to exclude same-sex couples from marriage so long as a valid alternative is available to them. In a legal case involving a dual Polish-German couple who had married in Germany but sought recognition of their marriage in Poland, Jakub Cupriak-Trojan and Mateusz Trojan v Wojewoda Mazowiecki, the European Court of Justice (ECJ) ruled on 25 November 2025 that Poland must recognise same-sex marriages performed in other member states of the European Union. The ruling had an immediate legal effect in Italy as well, with media outlets reporting that "authorities must recognize same-sex marriages performed abroad as full marriages, rather than just granting them the limited rights of a registered partnership". Cupriak-Trojan and Trojan does not compel Italy to change its domestic laws to legalise same-sex marriage, but it does require that the country accept the legal status of couples married elsewhere in the European Union.

=== Court cases ===
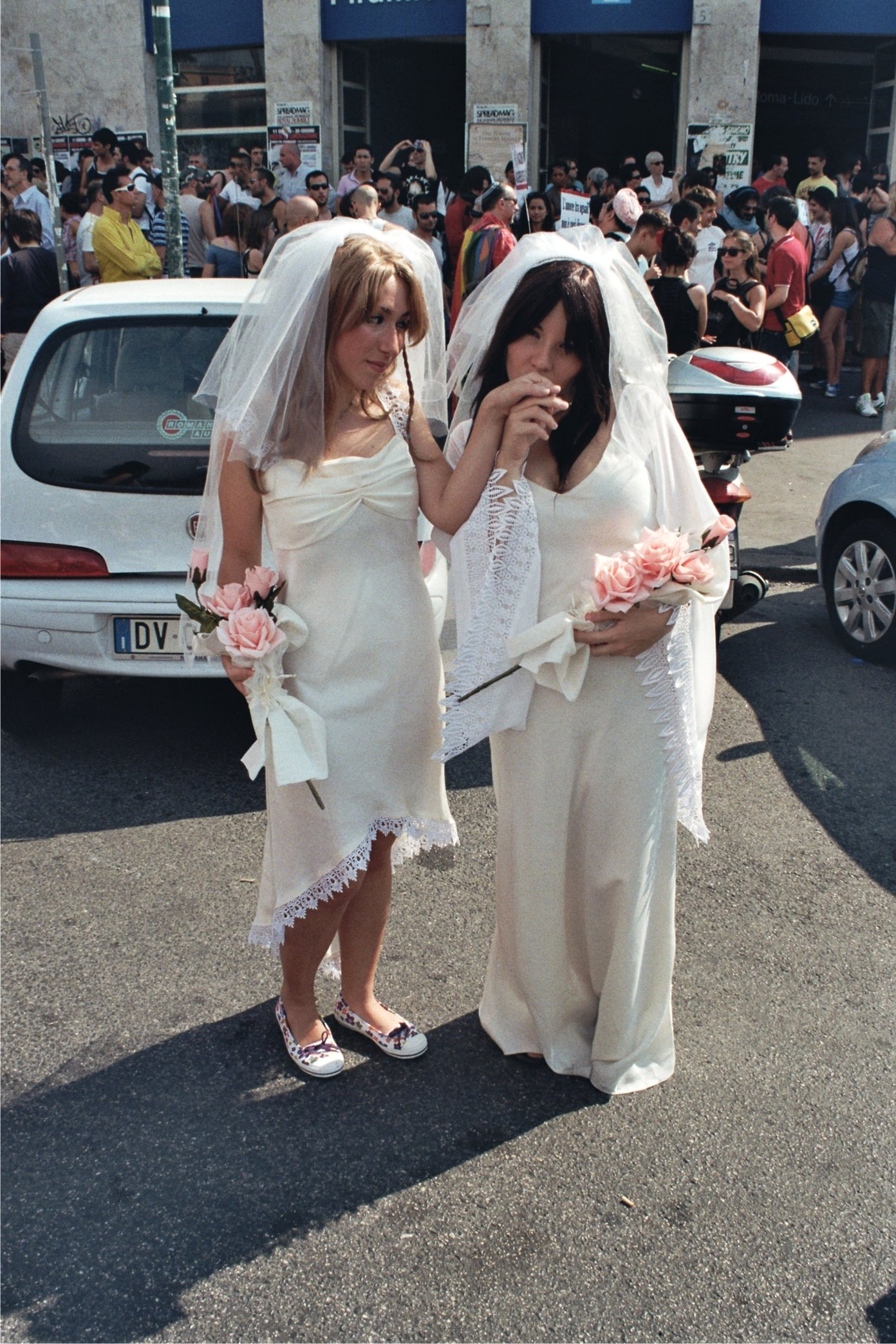
Two women dressed as brides at a pride parade in Rome, July 2010

In 2009, a same-sex couple from Venice sued city officials after they had denied them a marriage licence. The case, which alleged that the Italian Civil Code violated Articles 3 (which forbids any kind of discrimination) and 29 (which states an ambiguous gender-neutral definition of marriage) of the Italian Constitution, was heard at the Constitutional Court. On 14 April 2010, the court ruled that the statutory ban on same-sex marriage did not violate the Constitution. However, it affirmed that same-sex couples deserve legal recognition since they are "social formations" constitutionally protected under Article 2 of the Constitution. The task of drafting legislation to this purpose was deemed by the court to be the Parliament's sole prerogative.

In January 2011, the Supreme Court of Cassation reversed a lower court decision that an EU citizen married to an Italian citizen of the same sex was not permitted to reside in Italy because they were not a family according to Italian law. The Court of Cassation ruled that the lower court should have applied the Citizens' Rights Directive on the right of EU citizens to move and reside freely within the member states. In another landmark ruling, the Court of Cassation ruled on 15 March 2012 that "same-sex couples have the same right to a family life as married straight couples", adding that "the judiciary shall grant them the same legal rights as enjoyed under marriage on a case-by-case rule". Although the court's judgment was not binding outside this case, the verdict paved the way for lower court judges to recognize individual rights for cohabiting couples, and same-sex unions to be equivalent to marriage in all but name. On 9 February 2015, the Court of Cassation interpreted the 2010 judgement of the Constitutional Court as meaning that it would be Parliament's choice whether or not to introduce same-sex marriage, civil unions or civil partnerships.

=== Religious performance ===
==== Roman Catholic Church ====
The Roman Catholic Church is the largest and most influential Christian denomination in Italy. It has historically been opposed to any recognition of same-sex relationships and repeatedly campaigned against the introduction of domestic partnerships and civil unions for same-sex couples in Italy. However, there has been public disagreement on the issue among senior figures and over the last few years a more welcoming and nuanced tone towards LGBT people has become common. In 2007, the Archbishop of Genoa, Angelo Bagnasco, compared the idea of recognising same-sex unions directly with state recognition of incest and pedophilia. He later condemned a ruling recognizing a same-sex marriage performed abroad. He has also described civil unions and same-sex marriages as a "Trojan horse that fundamentally weaken the institution of the family". However, in his book Credere e conoscere, published shortly before his death in 2012, Cardinal Carlo Maria Martini disagreed with Catholic opposition to civil unions: "I disagree with the positions of those in the Church, that take issue with civil unions", he wrote. "It is not bad, instead of casual sex between men, that two people have a certain stability" and said that the "state could recognize them". Although he stated his belief that "the homosexual couple, as such, can never be totally equated to a marriage". With the election of Pope Francis in 2013, the Catholic Church adopted a more welcoming attitude towards LGBT people. A few months after his election, the Pope stated the now-famous "Who am I to judge?". In 2020 and 2021, Pope Francis voiced his support for civil unions, while maintaining opposition to same-sex marriage. This view represents the Pope's personal views and did not change the official doctrine of the Church.

In May 2022, Pope Francis chose Cardinal Matteo Maria Zuppi to serve a five-year term as president of the Episcopal Conference of Italy, the official assembly of the Catholic bishops in Italy and the main body coordinating political relations between the Catholic Church and the Italian state. Zuppi is widely regarded as a "progressive" within the Church and in June 2022 he was accused of covering up the blessing of a same-sex couple after their civil union near Bologna. According to Italian media, the blessing of Pietro Morotti and Giacomo Spagnoli reportedly took place in the presence of six priests at San Lorenzo in Budrio. In December 2023, the Holy See published Fiducia supplicans, a declaration allowing Catholic priests to bless couples who are not considered to be married according to church teaching, including the blessing of same-sex couples. Zuppi reacted to the declaration, "The Church communicates the love that explains the rule and makes it alive, and this is done by re-establishing a relationship with everyone. The world is not black and white and requires listening, discernment, acceptance. Someone may think: this way you lose the truth."

==== Other denominations ====
The Union of Methodist and Waldensian Churches was the first Italian Christian denomination to authorise the blessing of same-sex couples in 2010. In 2017, it allowed its clergy to bless same-sex civil unions as well. Similarly, the Lutheran Evangelical Church in Italy has allowed pastors to bless same-sex unions since 2011.

== Public opinion ==
According to a February 2007 poll by la Repubblica, 67% of Italian Catholics backed the draft civil union bill proposed at the time, but only 35% thought it should apply to same-sex couples. 80% of Italians said they supported the law. The 2006 Eurobarometer survey showed that 31% of Italians thought that same-sex marriages should be allowed throughout Europe and 24% were in favour of allowing adoption by same-sex couples. This was below the European Union average of 44% and 32% respectively. A Eurispes poll conducted in early 2009 showed that 40.4% of Italians supported same-sex marriage and 18.5% supported civil unions but not marriage. Thus, 58.9% of respondents supported some form of recognition for same-sex couples. The only area with majority support for same-sex marriage was in the north-west (Piedmont and Liguria, where 54.8% were in favour). Nevertheless, in every Italian region except Sicily, a majority supported some form of recognition for same-sex couples. Among those who considered themselves on the political left, 66.5% supported same-sex marriage. The same poll was repeated in January 2010, when 41.0% of respondents supported same-sex marriage and 20.4% supported civil unions but not marriage. Thus, support for some form of recognition for same-sex couples had risen to 61.4%.

On the occasion of the International Day Against Homophobia, Biphobia and Transphobia on 17 May 2012, the National Bureau of Statistics (ISTAT) released an official governmental report on attitudes towards homosexuality among the Italian population. The poll, conducted in 2011, found that 62.8% of interviewees were in favour of civil unions with the same rights as marriage. Those who agreed with same-sex marriage were 43.9%, with residents in central Italy (52.6%), 18–34 years old (53.4%) and women (47%) being the geographical, age and gender categories most in favour. Significantly, every region supported civil unions, with support being highest in central Italy (72.2%) and lowest in the south (51.2%).

Support for same-sex marriage among 18–21-year-olds according to a 2016 survey from the Varkey Foundation

A May 2013 Ipsos poll found that 48% of respondents were in favour of same-sex marriage and another 31% supported other forms of legal recognition for same-sex couples. According to an Ifop poll conducted in May 2013, 42% of Italians supported allowing same-sex couples to marry and adopt children. An October 2014 Demos poll found that 55% of respondents were in favour of same-sex marriage with 42% against. Similarly, the 2015 Eurobarometer found that 55% of Italians thought that same-sex marriage should be allowed throughout Europe, while 35% were against.

In January 2016, a IPR Marketing poll showed that 46% of respondents were in favour of same-sex civil unions with 40% against. With regard to same-sex marriage, 38% of respondents were in favour and 55% were against. In addition, 85% of those polled were against adoption by same-sex couples. In February 2016, days after the Senate approved the civil union bill, a Demos poll showed again a large majority in favour of civil unions (69%), a majority for same-sex marriage (56%), but still only a minority approving of stepchild adoption (37%). A September–October 2016 survey by the Varkey Foundation found that 73% of 18–21-year-olds supported same-sex marriage in Italy. A Pew Research Center poll, conducted between April and August 2017 and published in May 2018, showed that 59% of Italians supported same-sex marriage, 38% were opposed and 3% did not know or had refused to answer. When divided by religion, 83% of religiously unaffiliated people, 70% of non-practicing Christians and 44% of church-attending Christians supported same-sex marriage. Opposition was 27% among 18–34-year-olds.

In 2019, a poll conducted by Eurispes found that 51% of Italians supported the legalisation of same-sex marriage. Adoption was supported by 31% of respondents, while 69% were opposed. According to a May 2019 Ipsos poll, 58% of Italians were in favour of same-sex marriage. Similarly, the 2019 Eurobarometer found that 58% of Italians thought same-sex marriage should be allowed throughout Europe, while 35% were against. A Pew Research Center poll conducted between February and May 2023 showed that 74% of Italians supported same-sex marriage and 26% were opposed. When divided by political affiliation, support was highest among those on the left of the political spectrum at 88%, followed by those at the center at 74% and those on the right at 66%. The 2023 Eurobarometer poll found that 69% of Italians thought that same sex marriage should be allowed throughout Europe, while 29% were against. A 2024 Eurispes survey estimated that 64.5% of Italians supported same-sex marriage, a 17% increase from 2016.

== See also ==
- LGBT rights in Italy
- Recognition of same-sex unions in Europe
- LGBT history in Italy
