= List of members of the Chamber of Deputies of Italy, 2013–2018 =

This is a list of the 630 members of the Italian Chamber of Deputies that were elected in the 2013 general election.

== The Government ==
=== Partito Democratico ===
- Luciano Agostini
- Roberta Agostini
- Luisella Albanella
- Tea Albini
- Maria Amato
- Vincenzo Amendola
- Sesa Amici
- Sofia Amoddio
- Maria Antezza
- Michele Anzaldi
- Ileana Argentin
- Tiziano Arlotti
- Anna Ascani
- Pier Paolo Baretta
- Cristina Bargero
- Davide Baruffi
- Lorenzo Basso
- Demetrio Battaglia
- Alfredo Bazoli
- Teresa Bellanova
- Gianluca Benamati
- Paolo Beni
- Marina Berlinghieri
- Giuseppe Berretta
- Pier Luigi Bersani
- Mariastella Bianchi
- Matteo Biffoni
- Rosy Bindi
- Caterina Bini
- Franca Biondelli
- Tamara Blazina
- Luigi Bobba
- Gianpieri Bocci
- Francesco Boccia
- Antonio Boccuzzi
- Paolo Bolognesi
- Lorenza Bonaccorsi
- Simona Bonafé
- Fulvio Bonavitacola
- Francesco Bonifazi
- Francesca Bonomo
- Michele Bordo
- Enrico Borghi
- Maria Elena Boschi
- Luisa Bossa
- Chiara Braga
- Paola Bragantini
- Giorgio Brandolin
- Alessandro Bratti
- Massimo Bray
- Gianclaudio Bressia
- Vincenza Bruno Bossio
- Giovanni Burtone
- Micaela Campana
- Emanuele Cani
- Angelo Capodicasa
- Salvatore Capone
- Sabrina Capozzolo
- Ernesto Carbone
- Daniela Cardinale
- Renzo Carella
- Elena Carnevali
- Mara Carocci
- Marco Carra
- Piergiorgio Carrescia
- Maria Chiara Carrozza
- Ezio Primo Casati
- Floriana Casellato
- Franco Cassano
- Antonio Castricone
- Marco Causi
- Susanna Cenni
- Bruno Censore
- Khalid Chaouki
- Eleonora Cimbro
- Giuseppe Civati
- Laura Coccia
- Matteo Colaninno
- Miriam Cominelli
- Paolo Coppola
- Maria Coscia
- Paolo Cova
- Stefania Covello
- Filippo Crimi
- Diego Crivellari
- Magda Culotta
- Giovanni Cuperlo
- Luigi Dallai
- Gian Pietro Dal Moro
- Cesare Damiano
- Vincenzo D'Arienzo
- Alfredo D'Attorre
- Antonio Decaro
- Umberto Del Caso De Caro
- Carlo Dell'Aringa
- Andrea De Maria
- Roger De Menech
- Paola De Micheli
- Marco Di Maio
- Vittoria D'Incecco
- Marco Di Stefano
- Marco Donati
- Umberto D'Ottavio
- Ettore Guglielmo Epifani
- David Ermini
- Marilena Fabbri
- Luigi Famiglietti
- Edoardo Fanucci
- Davide Faraone
- Gianni Farina
- Stefano Fassina
- Marco Fedi
- Donatella Ferranti
- Alan Ferrari
- Andrea Ferro
- Emauele Fiano
- Massimo Fiorio
- Giuseppe Fioroni
- Vincenzo Folino
- Cinzia Maria Fontana
- Paolo Fontanelli
- Filippo Fossati
- Gian Mario Fragomeli
- Dario Franceschini
- Silvia Fregolent
- Maria Chiara Gadda
- Carlo Galli
- Giampaolo Galii
- Guido Galperti
- Paolo Gandolfi
- Laura Garavini
- Francesco Saverio Garofani
- Enrico Gasbarra
- Daniela Gasparini
- Federico Gelli
- Francantonio Genovese
- Paolo Gentiloni Silveri
- Manuela Ghizzoni
- Roberto Giachetti
- Anna Giacobbe
- Antonello Giacomelli
- Federico Ginati
- Dario Ginefra
- Tommaso Ginoble
- Andrea Giorgis
- Fabrizia Giuliani
- Giampiero Giulietti
- Marialuisa Gnecchi
- Sandro Gozi
- Gero Grassi
- Maria Gaetana Greco
- Monica Gregori
- Chiara Gribaudo
- Giuseppe Guerini
- Lorenzo Guerini
- Mauro Guerra
- Maria Tindara Gullo
- Yoram Gutgeld
- Maria Iacono
- Tino Ianuzzi
- Leonardo Impegno
- Antonella Incerti
- Vanna Iori
- Cécile Kyenge
- Francesco Laforgia
- Francesca La Marca
- Enzo Lattuca
- Giuseppe Lauricella
- Giovanni Legnini
- Donata Lenzi
- Emanuele Lodolini
- Alberto Losacco
- Luca Lotti
- Maria Anna Madia
- Patrizia Maestri
- Ernesto Magorno
- Gianna Malisani
- Simona Flavia Malpezzi
- Andrea Manciulli
- Massimilianno Manfredi
- Irene Manzi
- Daniele Marantelli
- Marco Marchetti
- Maino Marchi
- Raffaella Mariani
- Elisa Mariano
- Siro Marrocu
- Umberto Marroni
- Andrea Martella
- Giovanna Martelli
- Pierdomenico Martino
- Michela Marzano
- Davide Mattielo
- Matteo Mauri
- Alessandro Mazzoli
- Fabio Melilli
- Marco Meloni
- Michele Pompeo Meta
- Marco Miccoli
- Anna Margherita Miotto
- Antonio Misiani
- Federica Mogherini
- Michele Mognato
- Francesco Monaco
- Colomba Mongiello
- Daniele Montroni
- Alessia Morani
- Roberto Morassut
- Alessandra Moretti
- Sara Moretto
- Alessia Maria Mosca
- Antonino Moscatt
- Romina Mura
- Delia Murer
- Alessandro Naccarato
- Dario Nardella
- Giulia Narduolo
- Michele Nicoletti
- Nicodemo Nazzareno Oliverio
- Matteo Orfini
- Andrea Orlando
- Alberto Pagani
- Giovanna Palma
- Massimo Paolucci
- Valentina Paris
- Dario Parrini
- Luca Pastorino
- Edoardo Patriarca
- Michele Pelillo
- Vinicio Peluffo
- Caterina Pes
- Emma Petitti
- Paolo Petrini
- Teresa Piccione
- Flavia Piccoli Nardelli
- Giorgio Piccolo
- Salvatore Piccolo
- Pina Picierno
- Giuditta Pini
- Lapo Pistelli
- Barbara Pollastrini
- Fabio Porta
- Giacomo Antonio Portas
- Ernesto Preziosi
- Giovanni Sanga
- Luca Sani
- Francesco Sanna
- Giovanna Sanna
- Daniela Sbrollini
- Ivan Scalfarotto
- Gian Piero Scanu
- Chiara Scuvera
- Angelo Senaldi
- Marina Sereni
- Elisa Simoni
- Roberto Speranza
- Nicola Stumpo
- Luigi Taranto
- Mino Taricco
- Assunta Tartaglione
- Veronica Tentori
- Alessandra Terrosi
- Marietta Tidei
- Mario Tullo
- Guglielmo Vaccaro
- Valeria Valente
- Simone Valiante
- Franco Vazio
- Silvia Velo
- Laura Venittelli
- Liliana Ventricelli
- Walter Verini
- Rosa Maria Villecco
- Sandra Zampa
- Giorgio Zanin
- Giuseppe Zappulla
- Diego Zardini
- Davide Zoggia

=== New Centre-right ===
- Angelino Alfano
- Gioacchino Alfano
- Paolo Alli
- Maurizio Bernardi
- Dorina Bianchi
- Antonino Bosco
- Raffaele Calabro
- Luigi Casero
- Giuseppe Castiglione
- Fabrizio Cicchitto
- Enrico Costa
- Nunzia De Girolamo
- Vincenzo Garofalo
- Antonio Leone
- Marta Leonori
- Enrico Letta
- Danilo Leva
- Beatrice Lorenzin
- Maurizio Lupi
- Antonino Minardo
- Dore Misuraca
- Alessandro Pagano
- Filippo Piccone
- Vincenzo Piso
- Sergio Pizzolante
- Barbara Saltamartini
- Gianfranco Sammarco
- Rosanna Scopelliti
- Paolo Tancredi
- Raffaello Vignali

=== Civic Choice ===
- Renato Balduzzi
- Alberto Bombassei
- Ilaria Borletti
- Ilaria Capua
- Mario Catania
- Andrea Causin
- Antimo Cesaro
- Luciano Cimmino
- Angelo Antonio D'Agostino
- Stefano Dambruoso
- Adriana Galgano
- Gianfranco Librandi
- Salvatore Matarrese
- Andrea Mazziotti Di Celso
- Bruno Molea
- Giovanni Monchiero
- Roberta Oliaro
- Stefano Quintarelli
- Giulio Cesare Sottanelli
- Irene Tinagli
- Pierpaolo Vargiu
- Andrea Vecchio
- Maria Valentina Vezzali
- Paolo Vitelli
- Enrico Zanetti

=== For Italy ===
- Ferdinando Adornato
- Paola Binetti
- Rocco Buttiglione
- Mario Caruso
- Angelo Cera
- Lorenzo Cesa
- Gianpiero D'Alia
- Lorenzo Dellai
- Giuseppe De Mita
- Federico Fauttilli
- Fucsia Fitzgerald
- Gian Luigi Gigli
- Gregorio Gitti
- Mario Marazziti
- Gaetano Piepoli
- Milena Santerini
- Mario Sberna
- Gea Schirò

=== Democratic Centre ===
- Roberto Capelli
- Aniello Formisano
- Carmelo Lo Monte
- Pino Pisicchio
- Bruno Tabacci

=== Italian Socialist Party ===
- Marco Di Lello
- Pia Elda Locatelli
- Oreste Pastorelli

=== South Tyrolean People's Party/Trentino Tyrolean Autonomist Party ===
- Daniel Alfreider
- Renate Gebhard
- Mauro Ottobre
- Albrecht Plangger
- Manfred Schullian

=== Associative Movement Italians Abroad/South American Union Italian Emigrants ===
- Mario Borghese
- Franco Bruno
- Renata Bueno
- Ricardo Antonio Merlo

== The Opposition ==
=== Five Star Movement ===
- Donatella Agostinelli
- Ferdinando Alberti
- Massimo Artini
- Marco Balsassarre
- Sebastiano Barbanti
- Massimo Enrico Baroni
- Tatiana Basilio
- Sergio Battelli
- Eleonora Bechis
- Silvia Benedetti
- Massimiliano Bernini
- Paolo Bernini
- Nicola Bianchi
- Alfonso Bonafede
- Giuseppe Brescia
- Marco Brugnerotto
- Francesca Businarolo
- Mirko Busto
- Azzurra Pia Maria Cancelleri
- Francesco Cariello
- Paola Carinelli
- Vincenzo Caso
- Laura Castelli
- Andrea Cecconi
- Silvia Chimienti
- Tiziana Cipprini
- Andrea Colletti
- Vega Colonnese
- Claudio Cominardi
- Emanuela Corda
- Emanuele Cozzolino
- Davide Crippa
- Tommaso Curro
- Fabiana Dadone
- Federica Daga
- Matteo Dall'osso
- Giuseppe D'Ambrosio
- Marco Da Villa
- Daniele Del Grosso
- Ivan Della Valle
- Michele Dell'orco
- Diego De Lorenzis
- Massimo Felice De Rosa
- Alessandro Di Batista
- Chiara Di Benedetto
- Federica Dieni
- Luigi Di Maio
- Federico D'inca
- Manlio Di Stefano
- Giulia Di Vita
- Francesco D'uva
- Mattia Fantinati
- Vittorio Ferraresi
- Roberto Fico
- Riccardo Fraccaro
- Luca Frusone
- Chiara Gagnarli
- Filippo Gallinelli
- Luigi Gallo
- Silvia Giordano
- Marta Grande
- Giulia Grillo
- Cristian Ianuzzi
- Giuseppe L'Abbate
- Mirella Liuzi
- Roberta Lombardi
- Marialucia Lorefice
- Loredana Lupo
- Claudia Mannino
- Matteo Mantero
- Maria Marzana
- Salvatore Micillo
- Mara Mucci
- Dalila Nesci
- Riccardo Nuti
- Paolo Parentela
- Daniele Pesco
- Cosimo Petraroli
- Paola Pinna
- Girolamo Pisano
- Aris Prodani
- Gessica Rostellato
- Giulia Sarti
- Emanuele Scagliusi
- Samuele Segoni
- Carlo Sibilia
- Giorgio Girgis Sorial
- Maria Edera Spadoni
- Arianna Spessotto
- Patrizia Terzoni
- Angelo Tofalo
- Danilo Toninelli
- Davide Tripiedi
- Tancredi Turco
- Gianluca Vacca
- Simone Valente
- Andrea Vallascas
- Stefano Vignaroli
- Alessio Mattia Villarosa
- Alberto Zolezzi

=== Forza Italia ===
- Ignazio Abrignani
- Antonio Angelucci
- Bruno Archi
- Simone Baldelli
- Deborah Bergamini
- Michaela Biancofiore
- Maurizio Bianconi
- Sandro Biosotti
- Michela Vittoria Brambilla
- Renato Brunetta
- Annagrazia Calabria
- Daniele Capezzone
- Maria Rosaria Carfagna
- Giuseppina Castiello
- Francesco Catanoso
- Elena Centemero
- Luigi Cesaro
- Gianfranco Giovanni Chiarelli
- Salvatore Cicu
- Rocco Crimi
- Luca D'Alessandro
- Antonio Distaso
- Fabrizio Di Stefano
- Monica Faenzi
- Raffaele Fitto
- Gregorio Fontana
- Benedetto Francesco Fucci
- Giancarlo Galan
- Giuseppe Galati
- Riccardo Gallo
- Daniela Garnero
- Mariastella Gelmini
- Sestino Giacomoni
- Gabriela Giammanco
- Alberto Giorgetti
- Pietro Laffranco
- Giorgio Lainati
- Cosimo Latronico
- Piero Longo
- Antonio Marotta
- Marco Martinelli
- Antonio Martino
- Roberto Marti
- Lorena Milanato
- Giovanni Carlo Mottola
- Rocco Palese
- Antonio Palmieri
- Elio Massimo Palmizio
- Massimo Parisi
- Giovanna Petrenga
- Guglielmo Picchi
- Catia Polidori
- Renata Polverini
- Stefania Prestigiacomo
- Jole Santelli
- Carlo Sarro
- Elvira Savino
- Sandra Savino
- Francesco Paolo Sisto
- Luca Squeri
- Valentino Valentini
- Paolo Vella
- Elio Vito

=== Left Ecology Freedom ===
- Ferdinando Aiello
- Giorgio Airaudo
- Sergio Boccadutri
- Laura Boldrini
- Franco Bordo
- Celeste Constantino
- Titti Di Salvo
- Donatella Duranti
- Daniele Farina
- Claudio Fava
- Francesco Ferrara
- Nicola Fratoianni
- Giancarlo Giordano
- Florian Kronbichler
- Luigi Lacquaniti
- Fabio Lavagno
- Giulio Marcon
- Toni Matarrelli
- Gianni Melilla
- Gennaro Migliore
- Martina Nardi
- Marisa Nicchi
- Giovanni Paglia
- Erasmo Palazzotto
- Annalisa Pannarale
- Serena Pellegrino
- Ileana Cathia Piazzoni
- Nazzareno Pilozzi
- Michele Piras
- Antonio Placido
- Arcangelo Sannicandro
- Arturo Scotto
- Massimiliano Smeriglio
- Nichi Vendola
- Alessandro Zan
- Filiberto Zaratti

=== Lega Nord ===
- Stefano Allasia
- Angelo Attaguile
- Stefano Borghesi
- Umberto Bossi
- Matteo Bragantini
- Gianluca Buonanno
- Filippo Busin
- Roberto Caon
- Davide Caparini
- Roberto Cota
- Gianni Fava
- Massimiliano Fedriga
- Andrea Gibelli
- Giancarlo Giorgetti
- Paolo Grimoldi
- Guido Guidesi
- Cristian Invernizzi
- Marco Marcolin
- Rudi Franco Marguerettaz
- Nicola Molteni
- Gianluca Pini
- Emanuele Prataviera

=== Brothers of Italy ===
- Edmondo Cirielli
- Massimo Enrico Corsaro
- Ignazio La Russa
- Pasquale Maietta
- Giorgia Meloni
- Gaetano Nastri
- Marcello Taglialatela
- Achille Totaro

=== Independents ===
- Ivan Catalano
- Alessandro Furnari
- Vincenza Labriola
- Edoardo Nesi
- Mauro Pili
- Alessio Tacconi
- Adriano Zaccagnini
