= Carlo Galli =

Carlo Galli may refer to:

- Carlo Galli (footballer) (1931–2022), Italian footballer
- Carlo Galli (political scientist) (born 1950), Italian political scientist
- Carlo Galli (diplomat) (1878–1966), Italian diplomat
