= Maria Edera Spadoni =

Italian politician

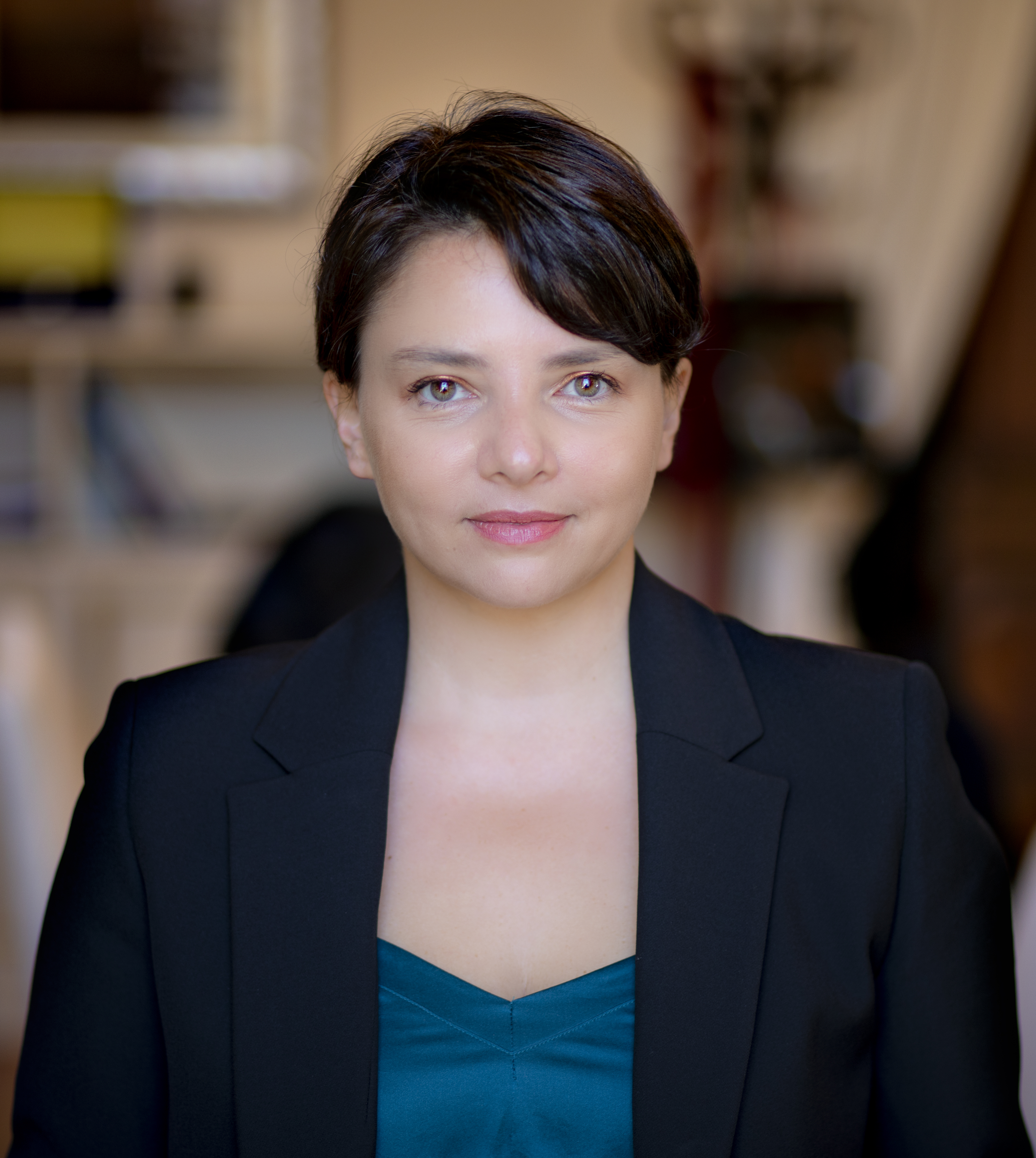

Vice president of the Chamber of Deputies
- In office March 29, 2018 – October 12, 2022
- President: Roberto Fico

Member of Parliament of the Italian Republic
- In office March 15, 2013 – October 12, 2022

Personal details
- Born: July 28, 1979 (age 46)
- Party: Five Star Movement
- Education: University of Bologna
- Occupation: Politician

Maria Edera Spadoni (born 28 July 1979) is an Italian politician from the Five Star Movement. She has been a member of the Chamber of Deputies from 2013 to 2022.

== Biography ==
Spadoni was born in Montecchio Emilia and graduated from the University of Bologna before working as a flight attendant.

== See also ==
- List of members of the Italian Chamber of Deputies, 2013–2018
- List of members of the Italian Chamber of Deputies, 2018–2022
