= Simona Malpezzi =

Italian politician

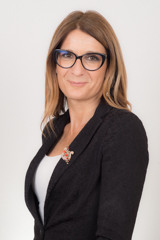
- Malpezzi in 2018

Leader of the Democratic Party in the Senate
- Incumbent
- Assumed office 25 March 2021
- Preceded by: Andrea Marcucci

Personal details
- Born: Simona Flavia Malpezzi; August 22, 1972 (age 54) Cernusco sul Naviglio, Italy
- Education: Catholic University of the Sacred Heart

Simona Flavia Malpezzi (born 22 August 1972) is an Italian politician. She was undersecretary of state for parliamentary relations in the Conte II and Draghi governments from 16 September 2019 to 25 March 2021. On 25 March 2021, she was unanimously elected leader of the Democratic Party in the Senate, succeeding Andrea Marcucci.

== Early life ==
She was born in Cernusco sul Naviglio and lives in Pioltello.

== Political career ==
She was elected to the Chamber of Deputies in the 2013 general election. She was elected to the Italian Senate in the 2018 general election.

== See also ==
- List of members of the Italian Chamber of Deputies, 2013–2018
- List of current Italian senators
