= Donatella Agostinelli =

Italian politician (born 1974)

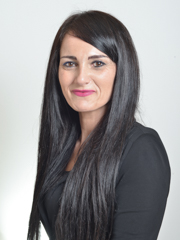
- Born: 3 April 1974 (age 52)
- Education: University of Camerino
- Occupation: Politician
- Political party: Five Star Movement

Donatella Agostinelli (born 3 April 1974 in Jesi) is an Italian politician of the Five Star Movement and member of the XVII Legislature of the Italian Republic serving on the Justice Commission.

== Early life ==
Agostinelli was born on 3 April 1974 in Jesi, Province of Ancona in the Marche region of Italy. She graduated with a law degree from the University of Camerino.

== Career ==
As a member of the Five Star Movement (M5S), Agostinelli won the 2013 Italian general election from Marche and became a member of the Italian Chamber of Deputies. She serves on the Justice Commission of the Chamber and was a member of parliamentary committee set up to investigate the death of an armed personnel. Agostinelli is the vice-chair of Vallesina Health and Environment Committee. She protested against the conversion of a sugar plant to bio-diesel refinery and voiced her concern against the high expenses of regional governing bodies. She has also participated in a hearing on transport Commission held in the Chamber of Deputies. Following the January 2017 Central Italy earthquakes, she questioned the slow response shown by the bureaucracy in relief work.

== Personal life ==
Agostinelli lives in the municipality of Apiro.
