= Giovanna Petrenga =

Italian politician

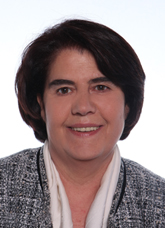
- Giovanna Petrenga in 2013

Member of the Senate of the Republic
- Incumbent
- Assumed office 2 July 2019

Member of the Chamber of Deputies
- In office 29 April 2008 – 22 March 2018

Personal details
- Born: 6 July 1956 (age 70) Casal di Principe, Italy
- Party: Brothers of Italy (since 2016)
- Other political affiliations: Forza Italia (2013-2016); PdL (2008-2013)

Giovanna Petrenga (born 6 July 1956) is an Italian Senator from Brothers of Italy.

== See also ==
- List of members of the Chamber of Deputies of Italy, 2013–2018
- List of members of the Chamber of Deputies of Italy, 2008–2013
- List of members of the Senate of Italy, 2018–2022
- List of members of the Senate of Italy, 2022–present
