= Sara Moretto =

Italian politician

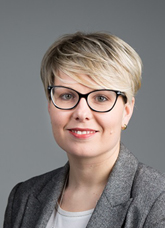
Sara Moretto in 2018.

Sara Moretto (born 28 September 1980) is an Italian politician. She was a member of the Chamber of Deputies for Italia Viva, formerly of the Democratic Party.

== Biography ==
Born on September 28, 1980, in Portogruaro (Venice), where she earned a diploma in accounting and business administration from the former “Gino Luzzatto” Technical Commercial Institute, she works in administration at the family business and graduated in 2004 with a degree in business administration from Ca' Foscari University of Venice.

Her political career began at the local level as a city councilor in Portogruaro, where she was elected twice in a row (in 2004 and 2010) as a candidate on a Centre-left politics civic slate.

In the 2013 general election, she ran for the Chamber of Deputies as the ninth candidate on the PD’s list in the Veneto 1 constituency, finishing as the last candidate to be elected as a deputy. During the 17th Legislature of the Republic, she served on the 8th Committee on the Environment, Territory, and Public Works, the 6th Finance Committee, and a Parliamentary inquiry committee.

In the 2018 general election, she ran again for the Chamber of Deputies on the PD’s list in the Veneto 1 - 01 multi-member district and was re-elected to the Chamber of Deputies.

Following the split in the PD caused by the group of Renzi-aligned lawmakers, Moretto joined Italia Viva in September 2019, the liberal, Centrism party founded by Matteo Renzi.

In the 2024 municipal elections, she ran for mayor of Portogruaro, backed by a coalition of centrist civic lists, and finished in third place.

== See also ==
- List of members of the Chamber of Deputies of Italy, 2013–2018
- List of members of the Chamber of Deputies of Italy, 2018–2022
