= Franco Ribaudo =

Italian politician

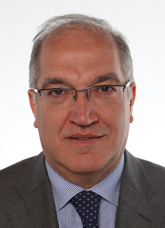
- Ribaudo in 2013.
- Born: November 23, 1959 (age 65); Marineo
- Website: http://www.camera.it/leg17/29?idLegislatura=17&shadow_deputato=306011

Franco Ribaudo (born November 23, 1959) is an Italian politician. He was elected to the Chamber of Deputies and belongs to the Democratic Party of Italy.

== Biography ==
He initially belonged to the FGCI and later got involved with the CGIL in the province of Palermo.

In 1994, he became a member of the provincial council of the province of Palermo for the Alliance of Progressives list.

In the 2008 municipal elections, he was elected mayor of Marineo.

In the general election of 2013, he was elected to the Chamber of Deputies in the list of the Democratic Party in the Sicily 1 district.
