= Elisa Simoni =

Italian politician (born 1973)

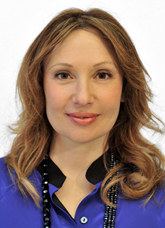

Member of the Chamber of Deputies
- In office 15 March 2013 – 23 March 2018

Personal details
- Born: 26 July 1973 (age 53) Figline Valdarno, Italy
- Party: Democratic Party (2007-2017; since 2019)
- Other political affiliations: PCI (till 1991); PDS (1991-1998); DS (1998-2007); Art1 (2017-2019)
- Education: University of Florence
- Occupation: Politician

Elisa Simoni (born 26 July 1973) is an Italian politician.

Born in Figline Valdarno, Simoni graduated in political science, and then earned a master's degree in education and human resource management. She was secretary of the Democrats of the Left of Valdarno Fiorentino and councilor in the municipality of Incisa in Val d'Arno. From 2006 to 2009 she was provincial commissioner for Education in the council led by Matteo Renzi, and between 2009 and 2013 she was provincial commissioner for Labor in the council led by Andrea Barden.

She was elected at the Italian parliament in February 2013 with the Democratic Party.
