= Liliana Ventricelli =

Italian politician

Onorevole Liliana Ventricelli
- Cecilia Ventricelli
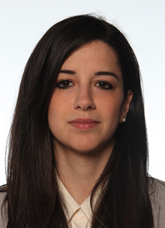
- Liliana Ventricelli

Deputy of Italian Parliament Legislature XVII of Italy
- In office 15 March 2013 – 22 March 2018
- Prime Minister: Enrico Letta (2013-2014); Matteo Renzi (2014-2016); Paolo Gentiloni (2016-2018)
- Parliamentary group: Democratic Party

Liliana Ventricelli (born 12 January 1986 under her real name Cecilia Ventricelli) is an Italian politician. She was elected as deputy of the Italian parliament and she became deputy on 15 March 2013 under Italian Democratic Party.

== Biography ==
Liliana Ventricelli was born in Altamura on 12 January 1986. After graduating from the classical lyceum "Luca de Samuele Cagnazzi" of her hometown Altamura, she enrolled in the faculty of law of the University of Bari. After her experience as an institute representative in high school, she becomes interested in politics.

In 2008 she starts to become involved in one of Italy's most prominent parties - the Democratic Party. In 2009 she becomes secretary of the circle Giovani Democratici in Altamura. In 2010, she officially joined Italian Democratic Party.

She supported important campaigns in her hometown - Altamura - such as the campaign on the referendum against the privatization of Italian water supply companies and against nuclear power. In February 2013, at the age of 27, she was elected as a deputy of Italian Parliament and she remained deputy until the end of the term in March 2018.
