= Angelo Tofalo =

Italian politician (born 1981)

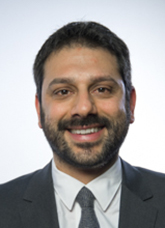
- Tofalo in 2018

Member of the Chamber of Deputies
- In office 15 March 2013 – 12 October 2022
- Constituency: Campania 2 (2013–2018); Campania 2 – P03 (2018–2022)

Personal details
- Born: 20 April 1981 (age 45)
- Party: Five Star Movement (since 2013)

Angelo Tofalo (born 20 April 1981) is an Italian politician. From 2013 to 2022, he was a member of the Chamber of Deputies. From 2018 to 2021, he served as undersecretary of the Ministry of Defence.
