= Marialucia Lorefice =

Italian politician (born 1980)

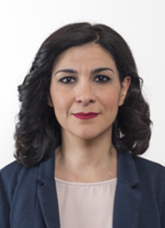
- Lorefice in 2018

Member of the Chamber of Deputies
- In office 15 March 2013 – 12 October 2022
- Constituency: Sicily 2 (2013–2018); Sicily 2 – U08 (2018–2022)

Personal details
- Born: 8 July 1980 (age 45)
- Party: Five Star Movement

Marialucia Lorefice (born 8 July 1980) is an Italian politician. From 2013 to 2022, she was a member of the Chamber of Deputies. From 2018 to 2022, she served as chairwoman of the Social Affairs Committee.
