= Carlo Dell'Aringa =

Italian economist and politician (1940–2018)

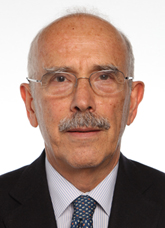

Member of the Chamber of Deputies
- In office 15 March 2013 – 22 March 2018
- Constituency: Lombardia 2

Personal details
- Born: 13 November 1940 Bronte, Sicily, Italy
- Died: 18 September 2018 (aged 77)
- Party: Democratic Party
- Education: Università Cattolica del Sacro Cuore (master's degree); University of Oxford (PhD)
- Profession: University professor

Carlo Dell'Aringa (23 November 1940 – 18 September 2018) was an Italian economist and politician.

== Biography ==
After winning a scholarship for the Augustinianum College, in 1963 he graduated in Political Science from the Catholic University of the Sacred Heart, then obtaining a doctorate in Economics from Linacre College of the University of Oxford in 1970. In 1981 and 1982 he was extraordinary professor of Political Economy at the Faculty of Law of the University of Ferrara. Since 1982 he has always been a professor of Political Economy at the Faculty of Economics and Commerce of the Cattolica in Milan [2].

From 1995 to 2000 he was president of the Agency for the negotiating representation of public administrations (ARAN). From 2001 to 2004 he was extraordinary commissioner of the Institute for the development of professional training of workers (ISFOL).

He was one of the drafters of the White Paper on the labor market in Italy, presented in 2001, on which the "Biagi Law", approved in 2003, is based.

In the 2013 general election he was elected to the Chamber of Deputies on the Democratic Party list. On 2 May of the same year he was appointed Undersecretary of State at the Ministry of Labor and Social Policies under Minister Enrico Giovannini in the Letta Government.

He died on 18 September 2018, aged 77, while he was in Corsica due to a heart attack. He rests at the Cimitero Maggiore di Milano, in a permanent tomb.
