= Alfredo Bazoli =

Italian politician (born 1969)

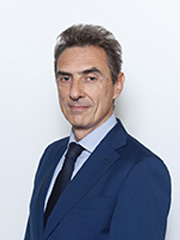
- Bazoli in 2022

Member of the Senate
- Incumbent
- Assumed office 13 October 2022
- Constituency: Lombardy – P03

Member of the Chamber of Deputies
- In office 15 March 2013 – 12 October 2022
- Constituency: Lombardy 2 (2013–2018); Lombardy 3 – P01 (2018–2022)

Personal details
- Born: 15 December 1969 (age 56) Brescia, Italy
- Party: Democratic Party (since 2007)
- Relatives: Stefano Bazoli (grandfather); Luigi Bazoli (great-grandfather)

Alfredo Bazoli (born 15 December 1969) is an Italian politician serving as a member of the Senate since 2022. From 2013 to 2022, he was a member of the Chamber of Deputies.

== Biography ==
Born in Brescia, where he earned his high school diploma from the Arnaldo Classical High School, he is the son of Luigi Bazoli, councilor for urban planning in Cesare Trebeschi’s municipal administration (1975–1985), and Giulietta Banzi Bazoli, one of the victims of the Piazza della Loggia massacre. His grandfather was Stefano Bazoli, a member of the Constituent Assembly and a deputy in the Chamber of Deputies during the first legislature for the Christian Democrats, while his uncle is Giovanni Bazoli, who served as president of Banco Ambrosiano and later of Intesa Sanpaolo, and his great-grandfather was Luigi Bazoli, one of the founders of Luigi Sturzo Italian People’s Party and a member of the Chamber of Deputies for that party from 1919 to 1921. He is married and has three children.

He graduated with a law degree from the University of Pavia with a grade of 110 cum laude in 1993 and has been a member of the Brescia Bar Association since 1996, specializing in corporate, banking, and administrative law.

He is involved in various cultural and community organizations in the city of Brescia, including the political culture magazine Città e dintorni, the charitable brotherhood Congrega della Carità Apostolica, and the nonprofit organization Mine Action Italy.
