= Michele Bordo =

Italian politician (born 1973)

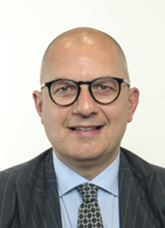
- Bordo in 2018

Member of the Chamber of Deputies
- In office 28 April 2006 – 12 October 2022
- Constituency: Apulia (2006–2018); Apulia – P04 (2018–2022)

Personal details
- Born: 7 September 1973 (age 52)
- Party: Democratic Party (since 2007)

Michele Bordo (born 7 September 1973) is an Italian politician. From 2006 to 2022, he was a member of the Chamber of Deputies. From 2013 to 2018, he served as chairman of the European Union Affairs Committee.
