= Roberto Marti =

Italian politician (born 1974)

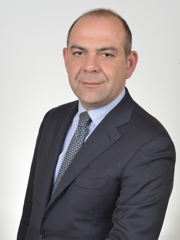
- Marti in 2018

Member of the Senate
- Incumbent
- Assumed office 23 March 2018
- Constituency: Apulia – 02 (2018–2022); Apulia – 05 (2022–present)

Member of the Chamber of Deputies
- In office 15 March 2013 – 22 March 2018
- Constituency: Apulia

Personal details
- Born: 11 June 1974 (age 51)
- Party: Lega

Roberto Marti (born 11 June 1974) is an Italian politician serving as a member of the Senate since 2018. From 2013 to 2018, he was a member of the Chamber of Deputies.
