= Andrea Giorgis =

Italian politician (born 1965)

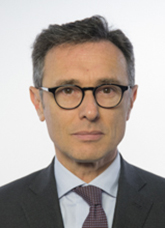
- Giorgis in 2018

Member of the Senate of the Republic
- Incumbent
- Assumed office 13 October 2022
- Constituency: Piedmont

Member of the Chamber of Deputies
- In office 15 March 2013 – 12 October 2022
- Constituency: Piedmont 1

Personal details
- Born: 12 April 1965 (age 61)
- Party: Democratic Party

Andrea Giorgis (born 12 April 1965) is an Italian politician of the Democratic Party who was elected member of the Senate of the Republic in 2022. He previously served in the Chamber of Deputies from 2013 to 2022, and as undersecretary of the Ministry of Justice from 2019 to 2021.
