= Antonino Minardo =

Italian politician (born 1978)

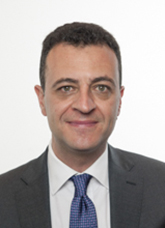
- Minardo in 2018

Member of the Chamber of Deputies
- Incumbent
- Assumed office 29 April 2008
- Constituency: Sicily 2 (2008–2018); Sicily 2 – 02 (2018–2022); Sicily 2 – 01 (2022–present)

Personal details
- Born: 5 February 1978 (age 48)
- Party: Forza Italia (since 2025)

Antonino Minardo (born 5 February 1978) is an Italian politician serving as a member of the Chamber of Deputies since 2008. He has served as chairman of the defense committee since 2022.
