= Giuseppina Castiello =

Italian politician (born 1971)

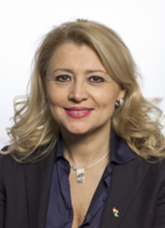
- Castiello in 2018

Member of the Chamber of Deputies
- In office 28 April 2006 – 12 October 2022
- Constituency: Campania 1 (2006–2018); Campania 1 – 01 (2018–2022)

Personal details
- Born: 30 January 1971 (age 55)
- Party: Lega

Giuseppina Castiello (born 30 January 1971) is an Italian politician serving as undersecretary for parliamentary relations since 2022. From 2006 to 2022, she was a member of the Chamber of Deputies.
