= Romina Mura =

Italian politician (born 1970)

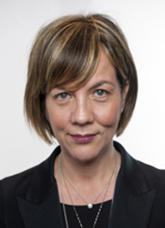
- Mura in 2018

Member of the Chamber of Deputies
- In office 15 March 2013 – 12 October 2022
- Constituency: Sardinia (2013–2018); Sardinia – P01 (2018–2022)

Personal details
- Born: 21 May 1970 (age 56)
- Party: Sardinia Project (since 2023)

Romina Mura (born 21 May 1970) is an Italian politician. From 2013 to 2022, she was a member of the Chamber of Deputies. From 2010 to 2020, she served as mayor of Sadali.
