= Daniele Pesco =

Italian politician (born 1973)

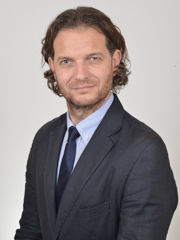
- Pesco in 2018

Member of the Senate
- In office 23 March 2018 – 12 October 2022
- Constituency: Lombardy – P04

Member of the Chamber of Deputies
- In office 15 March 2013 – 22 March 2018
- Constituency: Lombardy 1

Personal details
- Born: 17 October 1973 (age 52) Monza, Italy
- Party: Five Star Movement

Daniele Pesco (born 17 October 1973) is an Italian politician. From 2018 to 2022, he was a member of the Senate. From 2013 to 2018, he was a member of the Chamber of Deputies.
