= Dalila Nesci =

Italian politician (born 1986)

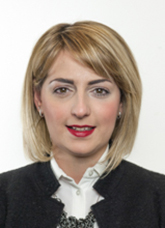
- Nesci in 2018

Member of the Chamber of Deputies
- In office 15 March 2013 – 12 October 2022
- Constituency: Calabria (2013–2018); Calabria – P02 (2018–2022)

Personal details
- Born: 23 September 1986 (age 39)
- Party: Brothers of Italy (since 2025)

Dalila Nesci (born 23 September 1986) is an Italian politician. From 2013 to 2022, she was a member of the Chamber of Deputies. From 2021 to 2022, she served as undersecretary for the South and cohesion policies.
