= Eleonora Bechis =

Italian politician

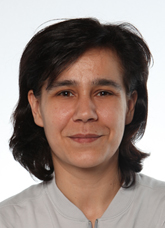
Eleonora Bechis

Eleonora Bechis (born 19 March 1974) is an Italian politician.

Born in Turin, Bechis graduated from an institute for hotel and restaurant professional services, and worked as a metallurgical worker.

In 2013 Bechis was elected deputy for the 5 Star Movement. On 26 January 2015 she announced along with other eight deputies and one senator her exit from the party, and entered the new group Free Alternative.
