= Alan Ferrari =

Italian politician (born 1975)

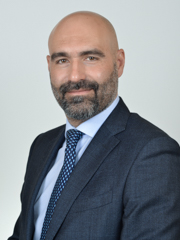
- Ferrari in 2018

Member of the Senate
- In office 23 March 2018 – 12 October 2022
- Constituency: Lombardy

Member of the Chamber of Deputies
- In office 15 March 2013 – 22 March 2018
- Constituency: Lombardy 3

Personal details
- Born: 14 February 1975 (age 51)
- Party: Democratic Party

Alan Ferrari (born 14 February 1975) is an Italian politician. From 2018 to 2022, he was a member of the Senate. From 2013 to 2018, he was a member of the Chamber of Deputies.
