= Miriam Cominelli =

Italian politician (born 1981)

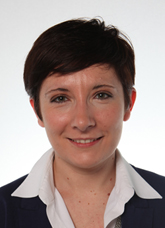
- Cominelli in 2013

Member of the Regional Council of Lombardy
- Incumbent
- Assumed office 8 November 2022

Member of the Chamber of Deputies
- In office 7 March 2013 – 22 March 2018
- Constituency: Lombardy 2

Personal details
- Born: 2 April 1981 (age 45)
- Party: Democratic Party

Miriam Cominelli (born 2 April 1981) is an Italian politician serving as a member of the Regional Council of Lombardy since 2022. From 2013 to 2018, she was a member of the Chamber of Deputies.
