= Arcangelo Sannicandro =

Italian politician

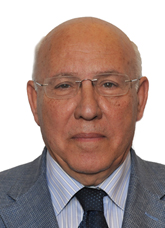
- Born: 9 July 1943 (age 82); Corato, Apulia, Italy
- Occupations: Lawyer and politician
- Political party: Left Ecology Freedom

Arcangelo Sannicandro (born 9 July 1943) is an Italian politician from the Left Ecology Freedom. As of 2014 he serves as member of the Chamber of Deputies representing Apulia.
