= Laura Garavini =

Italian politician (born 1966)

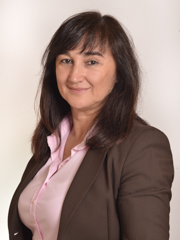
- Garavini in 2018

Member of the Senate
- In office 23 March 2018 – 12 October 2022
- Constituency: Europe

Member of the Chamber of Deputies
- In office 29 April 2008 – 22 March 2018
- Constituency: Europe

Personal details
- Born: 23 July 1966 (age 59)
- Party: Italia Viva (since 2019)

Laura Garavini (born 23 July 1966) is an Italian politician. From 2018 to 2022, she was a member of the Senate. From 2008 to 2018, she was a member of the Chamber of Deputies.
