= Mara Mucci =

Italian politician

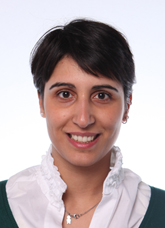
Mara Mucci

Mara Mucci (born 5 July 1982) is an Italian politician.

Born in Bologna, Mucci got a degree in computer science, did competitive swimming, and also was a theater actress and a photographer.

In 2013 Mucci was elected deputy for the 5 Star Movement. On 26 January 2015 she announced along with other eight deputies and one senator her exit from the party, and entered the new group Free Alternative.
