= Giovanna Palma =

Italian politician

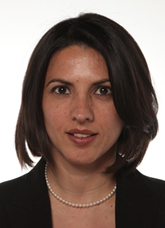
Giovanna Palma

Giovanna Palma (born 11 August 1974) is an Italian politician.

Born in Naples, Palma was elected to the Italian parliament in February 2013 representing the Democratic Party.

== Biography ==
Born in Naples, she lives in Giugliano in Campania. She holds a law degree and is a lawyer.

In the 2013 general election, she ran for the Chamber of Deputies (Italy) on the Democratic Party (Italy) ticket in the Campania 1 constituency, where she was elected as a deputy. In the Chamber of Deputies, she served as a member of the 13th Agriculture Committee and the Parliamentary Commission of Inquiry into the illegal waste cycle.

In the 2018 general election, she ran for the Senate of the Republic (Italy) in the single-member constituency of Giugliano in Campania as a candidate for the center-left, receiving 11.92% of the vote but failing to win a seat.
