= Irene Manzi =

Italian politician (born 1977)

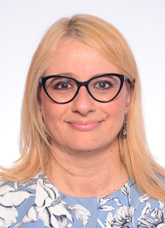
- Manzi in 2022

Member of the Chamber of Deputies
- Incumbent
- Assumed office 13 October 2022
- Constituency: Marche – P01
- In office 15 March 2013 – 22 March 2018
- Constituency: Marche

Personal details
- Born: 16 August 1977 (age 48)
- Party: Democratic Party

Irene Manzi (born 16 August 1977) is an Italian politician. She has been a member of the Chamber of Deputies since 2022, having previously served from 2013 to 2018. From 2010 to 2013, she served as deputy mayor of Macerata.
