= Silvia Fregolent =

Italian politician (born 1972)

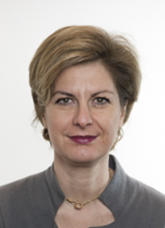
- Fregolent in 2018

Member of the Senate
- Incumbent
- Assumed office 13 October 2022
- Constituency: Emilia-Romagna – P01

Member of the Chamber of Deputies
- In office 15 March 2013 – 12 October 2022
- Constituency: Piedmont 1 (2013–2018); Piedmont 1 – P01 (2018–2022)

Personal details
- Born: 25 January 1972 (age 54)
- Party: Italia Viva (since 2019)

Silvia Fregolent (born 25 January 1972) is an Italian politician serving as a member of the Senate since 2022. From 2013 to 2022, she was a member of the Chamber of Deputies.
