= Luca Squeri =

Italian politician (born 1961)

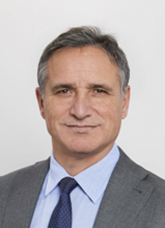
- Squeri in 2018

Member of the Chamber of Deputies
- Incumbent
- Assumed office 15 March 2013
- Constituency: Lombardy 1 (2013–2018); Lombardy 1 – U10 (2018–2022); Lombardy 3 – P02 (2022–present)

Personal details
- Born: 18 December 1961 (age 64)
- Party: Forza Italia (since 2013)

Luca Squeri (born 18 December 1961) is an Italian politician serving as a member of the Chamber of Deputies since 2013. He is the son of Carlo Squeri.
