= Mario Marazziti =

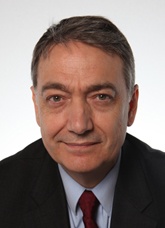

Member of the Chamber of Deputies
- Incumbent
- Assumed office 21 July 2015
- President: Laura Boldrini
- Preceded by: Pierpaolo Vargiu
- Constituency: Sicily 2

Personal details
- Born: 24 April 1952 (age 73) Rome
- Party: Civic Choice (2013); Populars for Italy (2013–2014); Solidary Democracy (2014–present)
- Profession: Journalist, Activist

Mario Marazziti (born 24 April 1952 in Rome) is an Italian journalist, executive, and politician. Currently a deputy in the Italian parliament, he is also an executive at RAI, an opinion writer at Corriere della Sera, and a representative of the Community of Sant'Egidio.

== Biography ==
He was part of the student group which founded the Community of Sant'Egidio in 1968, becoming one of the leaders of their movement against the death penalty. He co-founded the World Coalition Against the Death Penalty in 2002, and in 2015 his English-language book, 13 Ways of Looking at the Death Penalty, was published by Seven Stories Press with an afterword by the writer Paul Elie.

Elected initially in 2012 to a lower house of parliament, he has continued to serve with a focus on a human rights issues since then. In 2013, Marazziti presented himself as a candidate at the presidential elections and was elected as a deputy in the XVII legislature. He formally left the Corrente Popolare on 10 September of that year along with several other party members to join the group Per l'Italia. He was among those who founded the party Popolari per l'Italia on 24 January 2014, then left that party to join Democrazia Solidale on 10 July that year.
