= Paola Pinna =

Italian politician

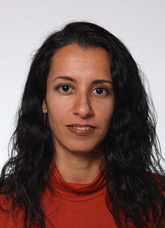
Paola Pinna

Paola Pinna (born 11 November 1974) is an Italian politician.

Born in Cagliari, Pinna graduated in Political Science, and earned an MBA in Business Management at the LUISS School of Government in Rome. She worked for seven years for a network of travel agencies.

In 2013, Pinna was elected deputy for the 5 Star Movement. On 27 November 2014, she was expelled from her party for allegedly not having given part of his salary as a parliamentarian to charity, as prescribed by the movement. She defended herself publishing the accounts of her donations on her Facebook page and then declaring she had been expelled for her criticism towards Beppe Grillo following the defeat in 2014 regional elections in Emilia-Romagna and Calabria. On March 26, 2015, Pinna joined the parliamentary group of Civic Choice.
