= Yoram Gutgeld =

Italian politician

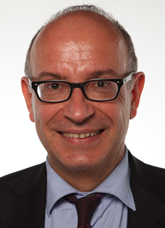

Member of the Chamber of Deputies
- In office 15 March 2013 – 18 March 2018

Personal details
- Born: 14 December 1959 (age 66) Tel Aviv, Israel
- Party: Democratic Party

Itzhak Yoram Gutgeld (born 14 December 1959) is an Israeli-born Italian politician and management consultant. He is a member of the Democratic Party.

== Biography ==
Yoram Gutgeld was born in Tel Aviv from a family of Polish Jews. He graduated in mathematics and philosophy in the Hebrew University of Jerusalem and received an MBA and Ph.D. from UCLA. In 1989 he went to Italy working for McKinsey & Company.

In 2012 Gutgeld met Matteo Renzi, at that time Mayor of Florence and soon became his close economic advisor.

After the 2013 general election he was elected in the Chamber of Deputies with the Democratic Party. In 2015 he was appointed as spending review commissioner for the Italian government by Prime Minister Matteo Renzi. In that role he generated structural saving of over 33 billion euros. He was removed from his post in 2018 by new Prime Minister Giuseppe Conte.

He was excluded by the Democratic Party's list at the 2018 general election.

== Other activities ==
- Trilateral Commission, Member of the European Group
