= Lorenzo Basso =

Italian politician (born 1976)

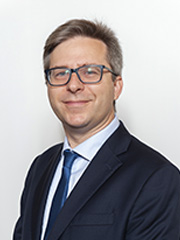
- Basso in 2022

Member of the Senate
- Incumbent
- Assumed office 13 October 2022
- Constituency: Liguria – 01

Member of the Chamber of Deputies
- In office 15 March 2013 – 22 March 2018
- Constituency: Liguria

Member of the Regional Council of Liguria
- In office 17 June 2008 – 18 March 2013

Personal details
- Born: 19 February 1976 (age 50) Genoa, Italy
- Party: Democratic Party

Lorenzo Basso (born 19 February 1976) is an Italian politician serving as a member of the Senate since 2022. From 2013 to 2018, he was a member of the Chamber of Deputies.

== Life and career ==
From 1995 to 2005, he served as a council member and later as vice president of the Genoa Central-West Municipal Council, focusing in particular on issues related to employment, the environment, quality of life, and Innovation.

In the 2009 PD primary elections, he supported Pier Luigi Bersani motion, which focused on the need to unite Catholic-populist values with those of Democratic socialism and social democracy.

He ran in the 2010 regional elections in Liguria as a candidate for the Democratic Party (Italy) and was elected to the Liguria Regional Council from the Genoa district.

He ran for regional secretary of the PD in Liguria, challenging Sergio Cofferati, and was elected in the primary election on October 25, 2009, with 44,021 votes.

He drafted the first regional anti-Mafia law, which was approved on February 29, 2021.
