= Giulia Sarti =

Italian politician (born 1986)

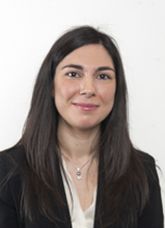
- Sarti in 2018

Member of the Chamber of Deputies
- In office 15 March 2013 – 12 October 2022
- Constituency: Emilia-Romagna (2013–2018); Emilia-Romagna – P01 (2018–2022)

Personal details
- Born: 13 August 1986 (age 39)
- Party: Five Star Movement

Giulia Sarti (born 13 August 1986) is an Italian politician. From 2013 to 2022, she was a member of the Chamber of Deputies. From 2018 to 2019, she served as chairwoman of the Justice Committee.
