= Giuditta Pini =

Italian politician (born 1984)

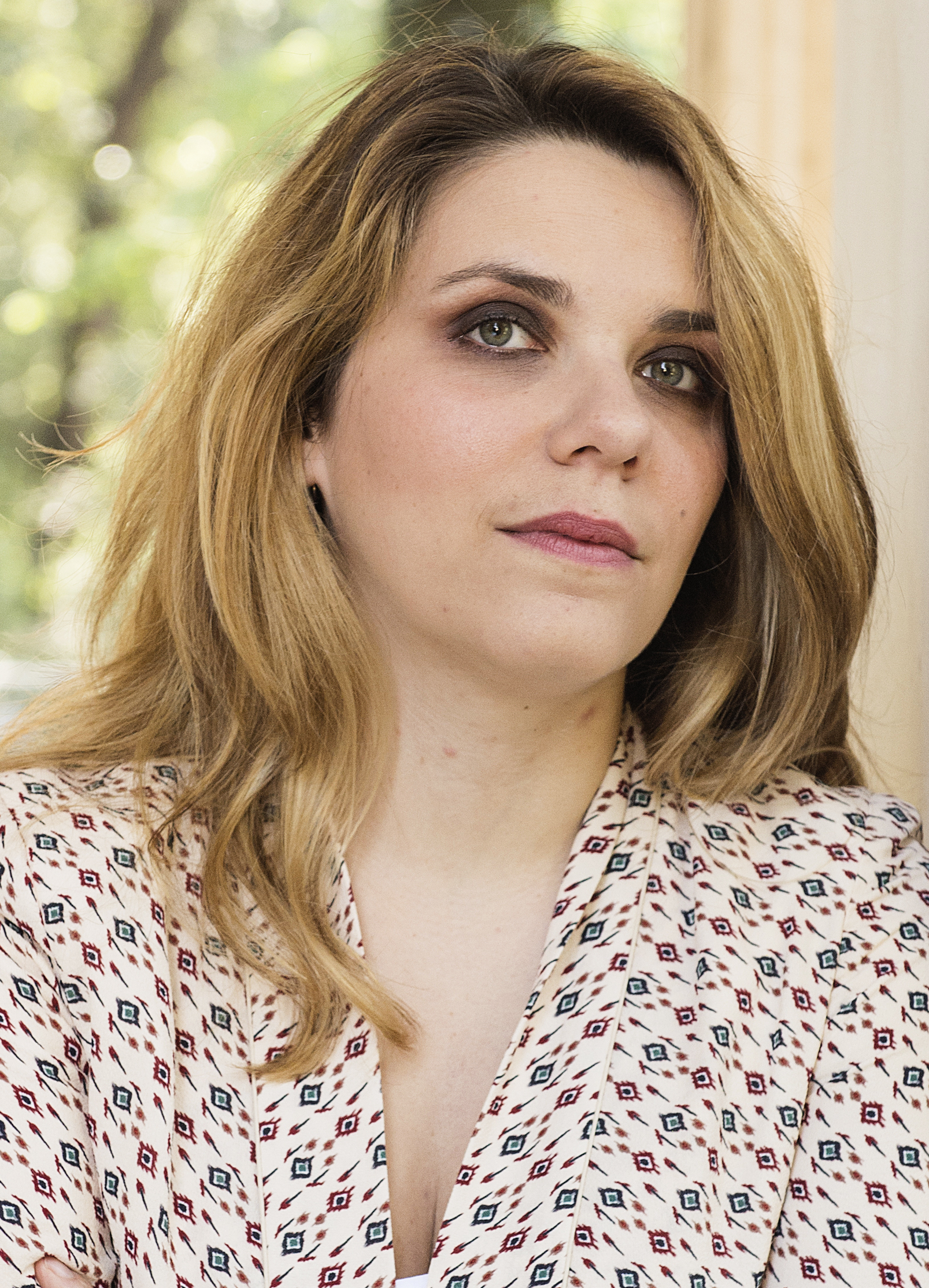
- Pini in 2019

Member of the Chamber of Deputies
- In office 15 March 2013 – 12 October 2022
- Constituency: Emilia-Romagna (2013–2018); Emilia-Romagna – 01 (2018–2022)

Personal details
- Born: 27 September 1984 (age 41)
- Party: Democratic Party

Giuditta Pini (born 27 September 1984) is an Italian politician. From 2013 to 2022, she was a member of the Chamber of Deputies. From 2012 to 2013, she served as secretary of the Young Democrats in the province of Modena. From 2015 to 2018, she served as deputy secretary of the Democratic Party in Emilia-Romagna.
