= Davide Baruffi =

Italian politician (born 1974)

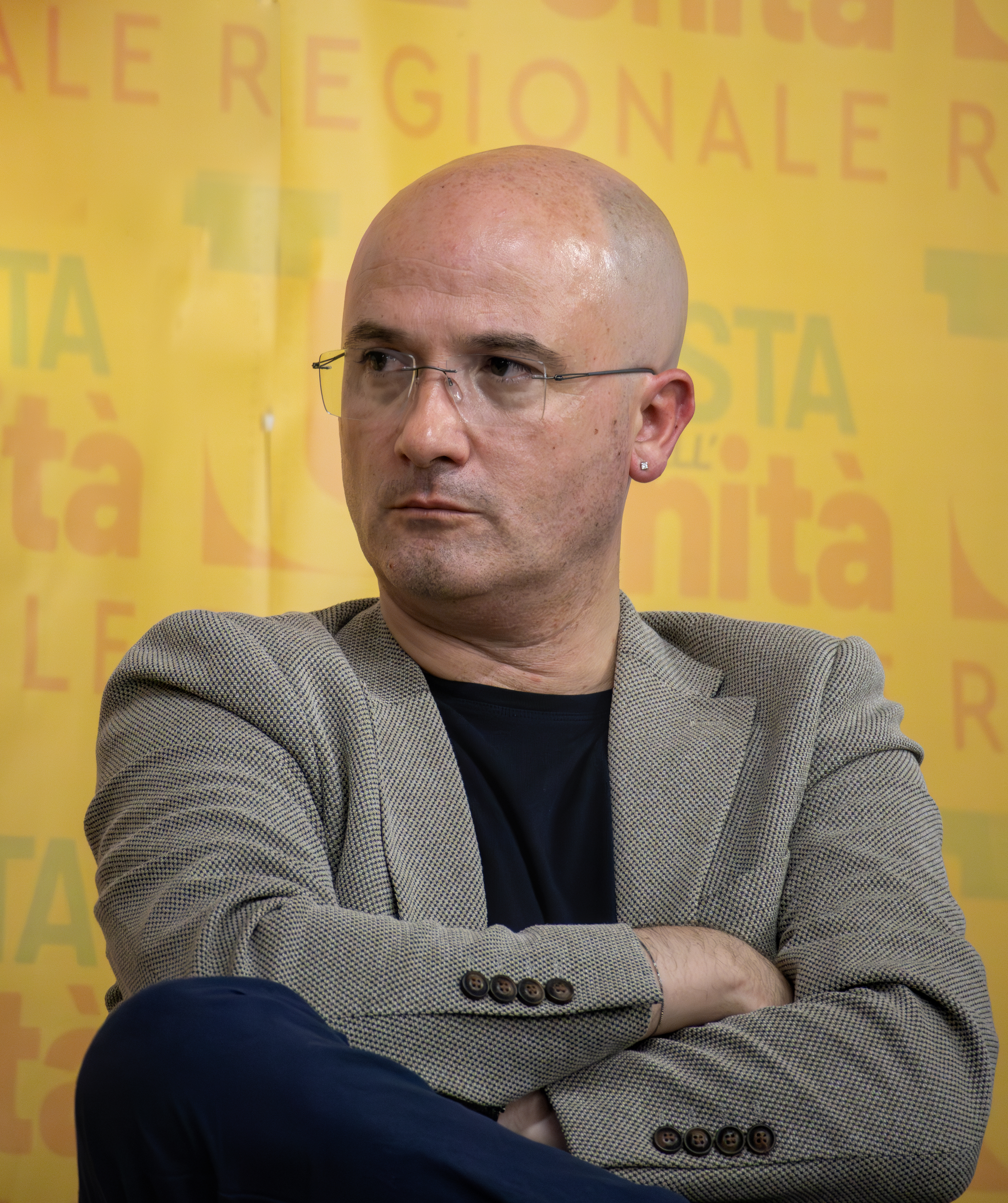
- Baruffi in 2024

Member of the Chamber of Deputies
- In office 15 March 2013 – 22 March 2018
- Constituency: Emilia-Romagna

Personal details
- Born: 4 October 1974 (age 51)
- Party: Democratic Party (since 2007)

Davide Baruffi (born 4 October 1974) is an Italian politician serving as assessor for the budget of Emilia-Romagna since 2024. From 2013 to 2018, he was a member of the Chamber of Deputies. From 1999 to 2009, he served as mayor of Soliera.
