= Maria Chiara Gadda =

Italian politician (born 1980)

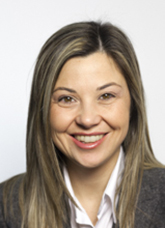
- Gadda in 2018

Member of the Chamber of Deputies
- Incumbent
- Assumed office 15 March 2013
- Constituency: Lombardy 2 (2013–2018); Lombardy 2 – P01 (2018–2022); Lombardy 2 – P02 (2022–present)

Personal details
- Born: 6 February 1980 (age 46)
- Party: Italia Viva (since 2019)

Maria Chiara Gadda (born 6 February 1980) is an Italian politician serving as a member of the Chamber of Deputies since 2013. From 2009 to 2013, she was a municipal councillor of Fagnano Olona.
