= Vittorio Ferraresi =

Italian politician (born 1987)

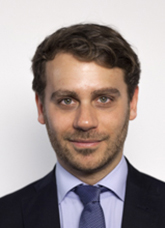
- Ferraresi in 2018

Member of the Chamber of Deputies
- In office 15 March 2013 – 12 October 2022
- Constituency: Emilia-Romagna (2013–2018); Emilia-Romagna – P02 (2018–2022)

Personal details
- Born: 21 September 1987 (age 38)
- Party: Five Star Movement

Vittorio Ferraresi (born 21 September 1987) is an Italian politician. From 2013 to 2022, he was a member of the Chamber of Deputies. From 2018 to 2021, he served as undersecretary of the Ministry of Justice.
