= Luigi Gallo =

Italian politician (born 1977)

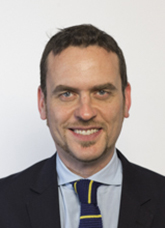
- Gallo in 2018

Member of the Chamber of Deputies
- In office 15 March 2013 – 12 October 2022
- Constituency: Campania 1 (2013–2018); Campania 1 – U11 (2018–2022)

Personal details
- Born: 21 September 1977 (age 48)
- Party: Five Star Movement

Luigi Gallo (born 21 September 1977) is an Italian politician. From 2013 to 2022, he was a member of the Chamber of Deputies. From 2018 to 2020, he served as chairman of the Culture Committee.
