= Marco Meloni (politician) =

Italian politician (born 1971)

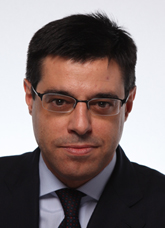
- Meloni in 2013

Member of the Senate
- Incumbent
- Assumed office 13 October 2022
- Constituency: Sardinia

Member of the Chamber of Deputies
- In office 15 March 2013 – 22 March 2018
- Constituency: Liguria

Personal details
- Born: 16 June 1971 (age 54)
- Party: Democratic Party (since 2007)

Marco Meloni (born 16 June 1971) is an Italian politician serving as a member of the Senate since 2022. From 2013 to 2018, he was a member of the Chamber of Deputies.
