= Gessica Rostellato =

Italian politician

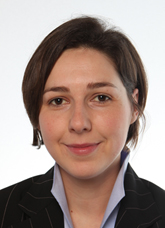
Gessica Rostellato

Gessica Rostellato (born 23 October 1982) is an Italian politician.

Born in Conselve and living in Cartura, Rostellato graduated in accounting and then worked as a labor consultant.

In 2009, Rostellato joined the 5 Star Movement and, in 2013, she was elected deputy. On 26 January 2015, she announced her exit from the party along with other eight deputies and one senator, and entered the new group Free Alternative. On 30 April 2015, she announced she was joining the Democratic Party.
