= Marietta Tidei =

Italian politician (born 1975)

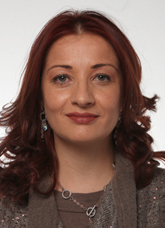
- Tidei in 2013

Member of the Chamber of Deputies
- In office 7 March 2013 – 22 March 2018
- Constituency: Lazio 1

Personal details
- Born: 20 November 1975 (age 50) Civitavecchia, Italy
- Party: Italia Viva
- Education: Libera Università Maria SS. Assunta

Marietta Tidei (born 20 November 1975) is an Italian politician serving as a member of the Regional Council of Lazio since 2023. From 2013 to 2018, she was a member of the Chamber of Deputies.
