= Dario Parrini =

Italian politician (born 1973)

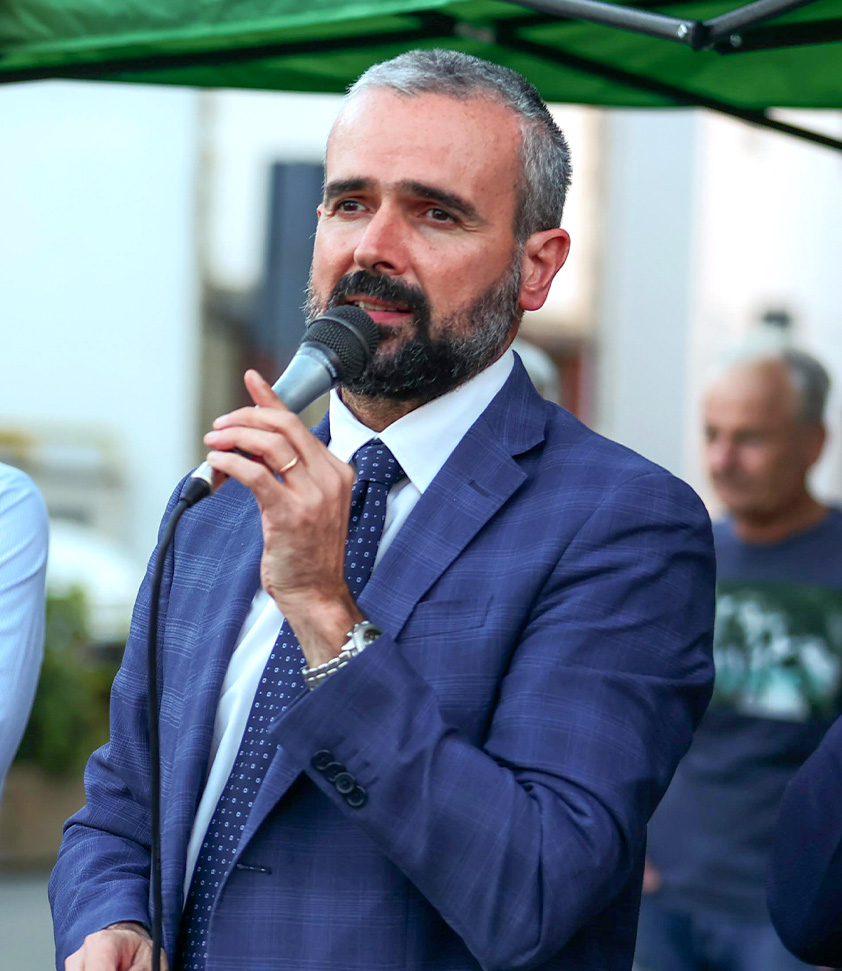
- Parrini in 2022

Member of the Senate
- Incumbent
- Assumed office 23 March 2018
- Constituency: Tuscany – U02 (2018–2022); Tuscany – P01 (2022–present)

Member of the Chamber of Deputies
- In office 15 March 2013 – 22 March 2018
- Constituency: Tuscany

Personal details
- Born: 17 October 1973 (age 52)
- Party: Democratic Party (since 2007)

Dario Parrini (born 17 October 1973) is an Italian politician serving as a member of the Senate since 2018. From 2013 to 2018, he was a member of the Chamber of Deputies. From 2004 to 2013, he served as mayor of Vinci.
