= Achille Totaro =

Italian politician (born 1965)

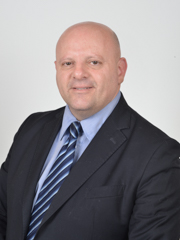
- Totaro in 2018

Member of the Senate
- In office 23 March 2018 – 12 October 2022
- Constituency: Tuscany – 01
- In office 28 April 2006 – 14 March 2013
- Constituency: Tuscany

Member of the Chamber of Deputies
- In office 14 March 2013 – 23 March 2018
- Constituency: Tuscany

Personal details
- Born: 24 September 1965 (age 60)
- Party: Brothers of Italy (since 2012)

Achille Totaro (born 24 September 1965) is an Italian politician. He was a member of the Senate from 2006 to 2013 and from 2018 to 2022. From 2013 to 2018, he was a member of the Chamber of Deputies. From 2000 to 2006, he was a member of the Regional Council of Tuscany.
