= Alberto Losacco =

Italian politician (born 1970)

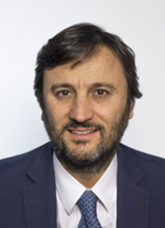
- Losacco in 2018

Member of the Senate
- Incumbent
- Assumed office 13 October 2022
- Constituency: Marche

Member of the Chamber of Deputies
- In office 29 April 2008 – 12 October 2022
- Constituency: Apulia (2008–2018); Piedmont 2 – 01 (2018–2022)

Personal details
- Born: 1 July 1970 (age 55)
- Party: Democratic Party (since 2007)

Alberto Losacco (born 1 July 1970) is an Italian politician serving as a member of the Senate since 2022. From 2008 to 2022, he was a member of the Chamber of Deputies.
