= Simone Valente =

Italian politician (born 1987)

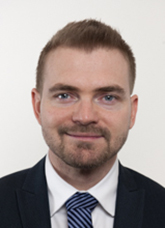
- Valente in 2018

Member of the Chamber of Deputies
- In office 15 March 2013 – 12 October 2022
- Constituency: Liguria (2013–2018); Liguria – P02 (2018–2022)

Personal details
- Born: 12 January 1987 (age 39)
- Party: Independent (since 2022)
- Other party: Five Star Movement (2010–2022); Together for the Future (2022)

Simone Valente (born 12 January 1987) is an Italian politician. From 2013 to 2022, he was a member of the Chamber of Deputies. From 2018 to 2019, he served as undersecretary for parliamentary relations and direct democracy.
