= Marco Fedi =

Italian politician

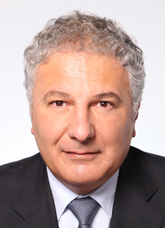
Marco Fedi

Marco Fedi (born 1958 in Ascoli Piceno, Italy), emigrated to Australia in 1983, is an Italian politician representing Italians living abroad.

He was elected to the Italian Chamber of Deputies in the 2006 general elections, as an overseas candidate for the centre-left coalition L'Unione (The Union) and re-elected in the 2008 for Democratic Party (Italy) with 12 409 personal votes. Fedi is a member of the Italian Democratic Party of the Left (DS). He was on the same ticket as Nino Randazzo who was elected to the Italian Senate.

Fedi was an elected member of the Comitato degli Italiani All'Estero (Com.It.Es.) (Committee of Italians Abroad) for Melbourne but resigned after his election in the Parliament. He is also the Vice Secretary of the General Council of Italians Abroad (CGIE).

== Previous Work ==
After emigrating in 1983, Fedi worked for the FILEF (Italian Federation of Immigrant Workers and Families) in Adelaide, South Australia until 1992.

Until 1997, he worked for the Patronato INCA-CGIL (Italian Migrant Welfare Organisation). Then, until 2005, he managed for multimedia centre for the Co.As.It (Italian Association of Assistance).

== Personal ==
Fedi is married and has three daughters.
