= Gabriella Giammanco =

Italian politician and journalist

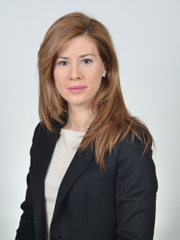

Member of the Senate
- In office 23 March 2018 – 13 October 2022

Member of the Chamber of Deputies
- In office 29 April 2008 – 23 March 2018

Personal details
- Born: 13 June 1977 (age 49) Palermo, Italy
- Party: Forza Italia (2008-2009); PdL (2009-2013); Forza Italia (since 2013)
- Education: University of Palermo
- Occupation: Journalist

Gabriella Giammanco (born 13 June 1977) is an Italian politician and journalist.

== Biography ==
Born in Palermo, Giammanco graduated in Communication Sciences and worked as a journalist for several local televisions and TG4.

Vice President of the Italy-USA Foundation since 2008.

In 2008 and 2013 she was elected to Chamber of Deputies with The People of Freedom.

In 2017 she was appointed press attaché of Forza Italia in Sicily.

In 2018 she was elected to Italian Senate, where she is a member of the Committee of European Union.

In 2019 she was a candidate at Elections to the European Parliament for the Forza Italia party.
