= Matteo Mantero =

Italian politician

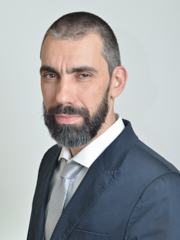
Matteo Mantero in 2018.

Matteo Mantero (born 23 August 1974) is an Italian politician. He was elected to the Chamber of Deputies in 2013, and moved to the Senate in 2018. Originally from the Five Star Movement, he defected to Power to the People in 2021, becoming the party's first representative in Parliament. He sits in the Mixed Group.

== Biography ==
As a young man, Mantero moved to Savona, where he earned a diploma from the ITIS as an industrial chemistry technician with a grade of 50/60. He attended the University of Genoa but took only 19 of the 26 exams required by the curriculum and did not go on to earn a degree. From 1999 to 2002, he ran a restaurant in Savona; from 2001 to 2007, he worked as a sales representative for several companies, specializing in the furniture industry. In 2005, he also launched his own furniture and interior design business. He contributed to several magazines; in 2013, he decided to close the business to devote himself to writing; among his published works is Viva la Revoluction. He is involved with a local amateur Basketball club, for which he played for several years in the CSI league and in the promotion division.
