= Caterina Bini =

Italian politician (born 1975)

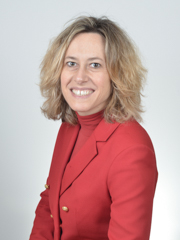
- Garavini in 2018

Member of the Senate
- In office 23 March 2018 – 12 October 2022
- Constituency: Tuscany

Member of the Chamber of Deputies
- In office 15 March 2013 – 22 March 2018
- Constituency: Tuscany

Personal details
- Born: 11 September 1975 (age 50)
- Party: Democratic Party (since 2007)

Caterina Bini (born 11 September 1975) is an Italian politician. From 2018 to 2022, she was a member of the Senate. From 2013 to 2018, she was a member of the Chamber of Deputies. From 2005 to 2013, she was a member of the Regional Council of Tuscany.
