= Renata Bueno =

Italian politician (born 1979)

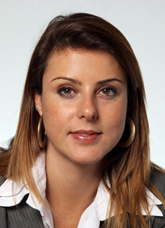
- Bueno in 2013

Member of the Chamber of Deputies
- In office 7 March 2013 – 22 March 2018
- Constituency: South America

Personal details
- Born: 10 November 1979 (age 46)
- Party: Cidadania (since 2000); South American Union of Italian Emigrants (2013–2014, 2019–2022)
- Parent: Rubens Bueno (father)

Renata Bueno (born 10 November 1979) is a Brazilian-Italian politician. From 2013 to 2018, she was a member of the Chamber of Deputies of Italy. In the 2006 Brazilian general election, she was a candidate for the Chamber of Deputies of Brazil. From 2009 to 2012, she was a member of the Municipal Chamber of Curitiba. She is the daughter of Rubens Bueno.
