= Giuseppe Brescia =

Italian politician (born 1983)

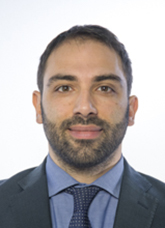
- Brescia in 2018

Member of the Chamber of Deputies
- In office 15 March 2013 – 12 October 2022
- Constituency: Apulia (2013–2018); Apulia – P01 (2018–2022)

Personal details
- Born: 3 August 1983 (age 42)
- Party: Five Star Movement

Giuseppe Brescia (born 3 August 1983) is an Italian politician. From 2013 to 2022, he was a member of the Chamber of Deputies. From 2018 to 2022, he served as chairman of the Constitutional Affairs Committee.
