= Silvia Benedetti =

Italian politician

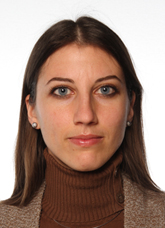

Member of the Parliament of Italy
- In office 5 March 2013 – 22 March 2018
- Parliamentary group: Five Star Movement
- Constituency: Veneto 1

Personal details
- Born: 24 October 1979 (age 46) Padua, Italy
- Occupation: Politician

Silvia Benedetti is an Italian politician. She was elected to be a deputy to the Parliament of Italy in the 2013 Italian general election, and remained in parliament until March 22, 2018.

== Career ==
Benedetti was born on 24 October 1979 in Padua. She is a biologist, with a degree in biological sciences.

She was elected to the Italian Parliament in the 2013 Italian general election, to represent the district of Veneto 1 for the Five Star Movement. She was a member of parliament until March 2018.
