= Salvatore Micillo =

Italian politician (born 1980)

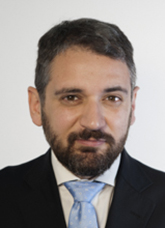
- Micillo in 2018

Member of the Chamber of Deputies
- In office 15 March 2013 – 12 October 2022
- Constituency: Campania 1 (2013–2018); Campania 1 – U01 (2018–2022)

Personal details
- Born: 20 February 1980 (age 46)
- Party: Five Star Movement

Salvatore Micillo (born 20 February 1980) is an Italian politician. From 2013 to 2022, he was a member of the Chamber of Deputies. From 2018 to 2019, he served as undersecretary of the Ministry of the Environment.
