= Giorgio Girgis Sorial =

Italian politician

Member of the Italian Parliament
- Constituency: Lombardy 2

Personal details
- Born: Brescia, Italy
- Party: Five Stars Movement
- Education: BSc in Information Engineering curricula Industrial Electronics and automation, master of first level in Business administration MBA
- Profession: Senior consultant
- Committees: 17th Parliament **Vice chairman Budget and Finance committee since 7 May 2013 **Vice chairman Special committee 26 March 2013 – 7 May 2013 **Member of the Childhood and adolescence committee 19 July 2013 - October, 30 - 2014
- Website: www.sorial.it

Giorgio Girgis Sorial is an Italian politician from the Five Star Movement.

== Biography ==
Giorgio Sorial was born in Brescia, Italy, son of Egyptian Coptic parents. He grew up mostly in Brescia, and after graduating from "B. Castelli" Technical Institute he graduated in Information Engineering (BSc) at the University of Brescia with an experimental thesis on the 2002/95/EC (RoHS directive: Restriction of Hazardous Substances Directive, restriction on the use of harmful substances in processes for the production of Electrical and electronic devices). After graduation, he has worked as engineer junior in the field of automation engineering for a few years, then he joined the International business area of the company where he worked, thanks in particular to the interpersonal and linguistic skills (in addition to the Italian he speaks fluently English, French and Arabic, the latter based to his Egyptian Coptic origins).

In 2010 he moved to Ireland where he started his post-graduate studies and in 2011 he graduated with an MBA (Master of first level in Business Administration) at The Trinity College in Dublin.

After his returns in Italy he was hired as a consultant in process and strategic management by the Irish branch of an international consulting company.

== Political activities ==
In 2009, he joined the local Meetup community “Beppe Grillo’s Friends of Brescia.” The following year, he ran as a candidate for the 5 Star Movement in the Lombardy regional elections.

At the 2013 Italian general election, he was elected to the Italian Parliament as a representative of the Lombardy constituency for the 5 Star Movement in the Chamber of Deputies, the lower house of Parliament. After taking office in March 2013, Sorial became vice chairman of the Budget and Finance Committee.

On 12 May 2015, he was elected vice chairman of the 5 Star Movement parliamentary group in the Chamber of Deputies, and on 5 August 2015 he became chairman of the group, serving until January 2016 in accordance with the movement’s internal rule requiring rotation of leadership roles..

== Parliamentary activities ==
Just elected he joined the only one working committee, called "special committee", being elected vice-chairman of the committee.

Until the establishment of all standing committees, when he became member of the Budget and finance committee being elected vice-chairman.

From 19 July 2013, he is also a member of the Parliamentary Committee on Childhood and Adolescence, until 30 October 2014.

Among its legislative proposals there are "Provisions on the purchase and sale of town cars or representatives dedicated cars", namely the law for the abolition of the so-called "town cars", approved by the Chamber of Deputies on 15 March 2016, and the draft law amending the law no. 243 approved on the 24 December 2012, on Balanced budget and Debt Relief for Transactions in Financial Items (2923).

He is also involved on other not-economic-financial topics, he has intervened on numerous occasions to denounce the environmental pollution in Brescia bringing a sample of hexavalent chromium contaminated water and presenting various parliamentary acts for the resolution of the Caffaro case.

Very active also in the defence of the small and medium-sized enterprises of the territory.

From 5 August 2015 until 5 December 2015 he was the chairman and spokesman of the Movement 5 Stars parliamentary group in the Chamber of Deputies.
