= Sergio Battelli =

Italian politician (born 1982)

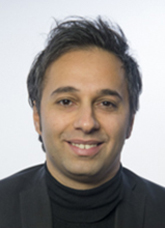
- Battelli in 2018

Member of the Chamber of Deputies
- In office 15 March 2013 – 12 October 2022
- Constituency: Liguria (2013–2018); Liguria – P01 (2018–2022)

Personal details
- Born: 7 October 1982 (age 43)
- Party: More Europe (since 2023)

Sergio Battelli (born 7 October 1982) is an Italian politician. From 2013 to 2022, he was a member of the Chamber of Deputies. From 2018 to 2022, he served as chairman of the European Union Affairs Committee.
