= Francesca La Marca =

Italian politician (born 1975)

Italian Senator
- Incumbent
- Assumed office 13 October 2022
- Constituency: North and Central America

Member of the Chamber of Deputies
- In office 15 March 2013 – 13 October 2022
- Constituency: North and Central America

Personal details
- Born: 30 October 1975 (age 50) Toronto, Ontario, Canada
- Citizenship: Italian; Canadian
- Party: Democratic
- Profession: Politician

Francesca La Marca (born 30 October 1975) is an Italian politician who is currently serving as the Senator from the North and Central America constituency of the Italian Parliament. A member of the Democratic Party, she previously served as a member of the Chamber of Deputies, representing North and Central America.

== Early life ==
La Marca was born on 30 October 1975, in Toronto, Ontario, Canada, to Italian parents: her mother from Sannicandro di Bari and her father from Delia.

She graduated from the University of Toronto with a degree in Italian and French, and also obtained a doctorate in French literature.

== Political career ==
In the 2013 Italian elections, she was elected to the Chamber of Deputies, in the constituency of North and Central America, as a member of the Democratic Party. Her election was the first time that a second-generation Italian citizen had been elected to Parliament.

In the 2018 election, she was re-elected to the Chamber of Deputies.

In the elections of 25 September 2022, she was elected to the Senate in the constituency for Italians abroad, as a member of the Democratic Party.
