= Carlo Galli (political scientist) =

Italian political scientist (born 1950)

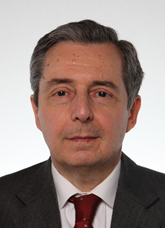
Portrait of Galli, 2013

Carlo Galli (born 1950) is an Italian political scientist and politician.

Born in Modena, Galli graduated in Philosophy from the University of Bologna in 1972. He was an assistant professor of the History of Political Doctrines from 1978, and from 1983 to 1999, an associate professor of the History of Contemporary Political Thought at the Faculty of Political Sciences of the University of Bologna, of which he was director until 2003. From 2004, he taught at the Faculty of Letters and Philosophy of the same university.

He has also been a member of the Chamber of Deputies of the Italian parliament.

== Research ==
His research interests have been oriented in particular to modern and contemporary political thought. He published books and essays on the Frankfurt School, on French counter-revolutionary thinkers, and on Weber, Strauss, Voegelin, Löwith, and Schmitt, among others. He has also worked on some of the main concepts of politics, such as "authority", "representation", "technique", "state", "war", and so on. Galli is currently working on the relationship between war and politics, analyzed from a theoretical, historical and practical point of view.
