= Ballester =

Ballester is a surname. Notable people with the surname include:

- Antonio Ballester (died 1387), Archbishop of Athens, appointed by Pope Urban VI
- Arturo Ballester Marco (1892–1981), Spanish artist and illustrator known for his Spanish Civil War posters
- Bernabé Ballester (born 1982), Spanish footballer who plays as a central defender
- Biel Ballester (born 1974), guitarist from Mallorca, Spain
- Gonzalo Torrente Ballester (1910–1999), Spanish Galician writer in Spanish language
- Inés Ballester (born 1958), Spanish journalist and presenter
- Jean-François Ballester (born 1965), French figure skating coach
- Jordi Carbonell i de Ballester (1924–2016), Spanish politician and philologist
- José Luis Ballester (sailor) (born 1968), Spanish sailor and Olympic Champion
- José Luis Ballester (swimmer) (born 1969), former butterfly swimmer from Spain
- Juan Ballester Carmenates (born 1966), Cuban painter
- Lorenzo Campins y Ballester (1726–1785), Spanish born physician, founded formal studies of modern medicine in Venezuela
- Manuel Ballester (1919–2005), award-winning Spanish chemist
- Manuel Méndez Ballester (1909–2002), writer who worked in journalism, radio broadcasting, television and teaching
- Pierre Ballester (1959) is a French sports journalist
- Simó Ballester (1457–?), nicknamed Simó Tort, leading figure in the social conflicts in Mallorca
- Thomas Ballester (born 1987), American professional wrestler
- Vicenç Albert Ballester (1872–1938), Spanish politician, Catalan nationalist, may be the designer of the "estelada"
- Vicente Ballester (born 1980), former Spanish racing cyclist
- Xaverio Ballester (Spanish transcription: Francisco Javier Ballester Gomez), Spanish linguist
- Marcos Fis Ballester (born 2007), Spanish handball player

== Fictional characters ==
- Pierre Ballester of L. A. Confidentiel, a book by David Walsh and Pierre Ballester

== See also ==
- Ballester Point, in Hurd Peninsula, Livingston Island in the South Shetland Islands, Antarctica
- Ingeniero Ballester Dam, a dam on the Neuquén River, in the Argentine Patagonia
- Ballester–Molina, a pistol designed and built by Argentine company Hispano Argentina Fábrica de Automotores SA
- Central Ballester, an Argentine football club, based in General San Martín Partido in Greater Buenos Aires
- Villa Ballester, a city located in the General San Martín Partido in Buenos Aires Province, Argentina
- Balesta
- Balestra (disambiguation)
- Balestrero (disambiguation)
- Ballesteros (disambiguation)
- Baluster
