= Overseas (Senate of the Republic constituency) =

- Senate of the Republic; Electoral constituency
- Electorate: 5.8 million (2018)

Current constituency
- Created: 2000
- Seats: 4
- Members: PD (3); MAIE (1)

Overseas (Italian: estero) is one of the 21 constituencies (circoscrizioni) represented in the Senate of the Republic, the upper house of the Italian parliament. With more than 5.8 million registered voters, it is the largest constituency by population, but it currently elects only 4 Senators.

The constituency was established by constitutional law no. 1 of 17 January 2000.

== Members of the Parliament ==
=== Legislature XIX (2022–present) ===
| District | | | Party | Senator |
| N. | Name | Map | Party | Senator |
|---|---|---|---|---|
| 01 | Europe | | Democratic Party | Andrea Crisanti |
| 02 | South America | | MAIE | Mario Borghese |
| 03 | North and Central America | | Democratic Party | Francesca La Marca |
| 04 | Africa, Asia, Oceania and Antarctica | | Democratic Party | Francesco Giacobbe |

=== Legislature XVIII (2018–2022) ===
Multi-member districts
| District | | | Party | Senator |
| N. | Name | Map | Party | Senator |
|---|---|---|---|---|
| 01 | Europe | | Democratic Party | Laura Garavini |
| 01 | Europe | | Lega–FI–FdI | Raffaele Fantetti |
| 02 | South America | | MAIE | Ricardo Antonio Merlo |
| 02 | South America | | USEI | Adriano Cario (until 2 December 2021) (Note: Expelled from the Senate following a certified electoral fraud.) |
| 02 | South America | | Democratic Party | Fabio Porta (since 12 January 2022) |
| 03 | North and Central America | | Lega–FI–FdI | Francesca Alderisi |
| 04 | Africa, Asia, Oceania and Antarctica | | Democratic Party | Francesco Giacobbe |

== See also ==
- Overseas constituencies of the Italian Parliament
- Overseas (Chamber of Deputies constituency)
