= Francesca =

- Pronunciation: /frænˈtʃɛskə/ US also /frɑːn-/; Italian: [franˈtʃeska]
- Gender: Female

Origin
- Origin: Latin franciscus, -a, -um, meaning "from France"
- Meaning: French, Free
- Region of origin: Italy

Other names
- Nicknames: Fran, Frankie, Cesca
- Related names: Francesc, Francesco, and Francis, and Frances

Francesca is an Italian female given name, derived from the Latin male name Franciscus meaning 'the Frenchman' It is widely used in most Romance languages, including Italian, French and Catalan, and place of origin is Italy. It is derived from the same source as the female name Frances, and the male names Francesc, Francesco and Francis.

== People named Francesca ==
- Daniel Francesca, Danish esports player
- Francesca Alderisi, Italian television presenter and politician
- Francesca Allen (born 2002), British adaptive rower
- Francesca Allinson, English author and musician
- Francesca Amewudah-Rivers, British actress
- Francesca Annis, British actress
- Julia Francesca Barretto, Filipino actress
- Francesca Battistelli, American Christian musician
- Francesca Beard, Malaysian performance poet
- Francesca Belibi (born 2001), American former basketball player
- Francesca Businarolo (born 1983), Italian politician
- Francesca Caccini, Italian composer and singer of the early Baroque
- Francesca Calvo (1949–2003), Italian politician
- Francesca Anna Canfield, American poet and translator
- Francesca Capaldi, American actress, former child actress
- Francesca Cima (born 1967 or 1968), Italian producer
- Frankie Corio, Scottish child actress
- Francesca Cumani, English racing presenter for ITV
- Francesca Curmi (born 2002), Maltese tennis player
- Francesca Cuzzoni, Italian operatic soprano
- Francesca Dani, Italian cosplay model
- Francesca Duranti (1935–2025), Italian writer
- Francesca Gagnon, Canadian singer and performer for Cirque du Soleil
- Francesca Galli, Italian road racing cyclist
- Francesca Gino, Italian-American behavioral scientist
- Francesca Hayward, English ballerina
- Francesca Henry, English actress
- Francesca Iossi (born 1977), Italian bobsledder
- Francesca Jones (tennis), British tennis player
- Francesca Lancellotti, Italian layperson declared venerable
- Francesca Le, American pornographic actress
- Francesca Lechi (1773–1806), Italian revolutionary and figure in Milanese society
- Francesca Lia Block, American author of the Weetzie Bat series
- Francesca Lubiani, Italian tennis player
- Francesca Martiradonna, Italian basketball player
- Francesca Martinez, British comedian
- Francesca Mollett (born 1991), British abstract painter
- Francesca Moraci (born 1955), Italian architect and academic
- Francesca O'Brien (born 1987), British politician
- Francesca Petitjean, French former bodybuilder and pornographic actress
- Francesca Piccinini, Italian volleyball player
- Francesca da Rimini, 13th-century Italian noblewoman and adulterer
- Francesca Salvalajo, Italian backstroke swimmer
- Francesa Sarah of Safed, 16th-century Jewish mystic
- Francesca Scorsese, American actress and filmmaker
- Francesca Schiavone, Italian tennis player
- Francesca Semoso, Papuan politician and broadcaster from Bougainville
- Francesca Simon, American author of the Horrid Henry series
- Francesca Stavrakopoulou, British theologian and broadcaster
- Francesca Torrent (1881–1958), Spanish writer
- Francesca Velicu, Romanian ballet dancer
- Francesca Woodman, American photographer
- Piero della Francesca, Italian painter
- Francheska Yarbusova, Russian artist

== Fictional characters ==
- Francesca, a character from the Rankin/Bass classic Mad Monster Party
- Francesca ("Frankie"), the eponymous main character from Melina Marchetta's Saving Francesca
- Francesca Lucchini, a character from the anime/manga series Strike Witches
- Francesca, a character from the series by Lauren Kate: Fallen
- Francesca or Franky, a character from Freaky Green Eyes
- Francesca da Rimini or da Polenta, a character from Dante's Inferno
- Francesca Russo, a character from The Wizards Return: Alex vs. Alex
- Francesca Caviglia, a character from Violetta
- Francesca Hollingsworth (Frankie), a character from the Degrassi franchise
- Francesca Danelli, a character from Bride of Re-Animator
- Francesca "Cesca" Montoya, a character from Waterloo Road
- Francesca Moretti, a character from Argentina, tierra de amor y venganza
- Francesca Johnson, a character from The Bridges of Madison County
- Francesca Hathaway, a character from The Haunted Hathaways
- Francesca 'Frankie' Dart, a character in the TV show Community
- Francesca Bridgerton, a character in Bridgerton
- Francesca Terwilliger, a character from The Simpsons
- Francesca, (known as Frankie) one of the main characters in Knights of Guinevere

== Translations ==
- Albanian: Françeska
- Basque: Frantziska
- Breton: Franseza
- Chinese: 弗朗西斯卡 (pinyin: Fúlǎngxīsīkǎ), 弗朗西斯 (Fúlǎngxīsī) or 弗朗切斯卡 (Fúlǎngqièsīkǎ)
- Croatian: Frančeska
- Czech: Františka
- French: Françoise
- German: Franziska
- Greek: Φραγκίσκη (Frangískī) or less originally Greek versions Φραντζέσκα (Frantzéska) and Φραντσέσκα (Frantséska)
- Hungarian: Franciska
- Icelandic: Fransiska
- Indonesian: Fransisca, Fransiska, Francesca, Francisca
- Italian: Francesca
- Japanese: フランチェスカ (Furanchesuka)
- Korean: 프란체스카 (Peurancheseuka)
- Maltese: Frangiska (shortened Cikka)
- Nahuatl languages: Francisca (shortened Pancha)
- Polish: Franciszka
- Portuguese: Francisca
- Russian: Франческа (Frančeska)
- Slovene: Frančiška
- Spanish: Francisca (shortened Paca or Pancha)

== See also ==
- List of articles starting with "Francesca"
- Hurricane Francesca (disambiguation)
- Francisca (given name)
- Anna Anderson (b. 1896 - d. 1984) a famous impostor whose real name was Franziska Schanzkowska who claimed to be Grand Duchess Anastasia Nikolaevna of Russia (b. 1901 - d. 1918).
