= Francisca (disambiguation) =

Francisca is a throwing axe used as a weapon during the Early Middle Ages by the Franks.

Francisca may also refer to:

- Francisca (given name), a feminine given name
- Francisca (film), a 1981 film directed by Manoel de Oliveira
- Catocala francisca, a moth species found in California
- Tinta Francisca, a red wine grape found primarily in the Douro DOC and is sometimes used in Port wine production
- Villa Francisca, a sector in the city of Santo Domingo in the Distrito Nacional of the Dominican Republic
- Francisca Club, a women's only social club in San Francisco
- Francisca, one of the Three Mage-Sisters from Kirby Star Allies

== See also ==
- Francisco
- Francisque
- Francesca
