= Francesca (disambiguation) =

Francesca is a female given name.

Francesca may also refer to

- Francesca (novel), a 1991 novel by Roger Scruton
- Francesca (film), a 2009 Romanian drama film
- Francesca (planthopper), a genus of achilid planthoppers
- Hurricane Francesca (disambiguation), several Pacific tropical cyclones
- "Francesca", a song by Mêlée
- "Francesca", a song by The Needs
- "Francesca", a song by Hozier

== See also ==
- Francisca (also spelled "fransisca"), a throwing axe used widely by Germanic peoples
