= Aberlin =

Aberlin is a surname. Notable people with the surname include:

- Betty Aberlin (born 1942), American actress, poet, and writer
- Joachim Aberlin, 16th-century German pastor, teacher, and songwriter
- Rachel Aberlin (fl. 1582–1609), Jewish mystic
