= Ballesteros (surname) =

Ballesteros is a Spanish surname. Notable people with the surname include:

- Alejandro Ballestero, Spanish politician
- Ángel Ballesteros Gallardo, Spanish poet and historian
- Camilo Ballesteros, Chilean politician
- Carolina Rodriguez Ballesteros, Spanish rhythmic gymnast
- Chasty Ballesteros, Canadian actress
- Elena Ballesteros, Spanish actress
- Enrique Ballesteros (1905–1969), Uruguayan footballer
- Estong Ballesteros, Filipino basketball player
- Francisca Ballesteros, Spanish murderer
- Francisco Ballesteros (1770–1832), Spanish general
- Gabito Ballesteros, Mexican singer-songwriter and record producer
- Héctor Ballesteros, Colombian weightlifter
- Hugo Ballesteros Reyes (1931–2019), Chilean politician
- Humberto Ballesteros, Argentine goalkeeper
- Irma Sandoval-Ballesteros, Mexican academic
- Jason Ballesteros, Filipino basketball player
- Javier Ballesteros, Spanish footballer
- Jesús Ballesteros, Spanish philosopher and jurist
- Jorge Ballesteros, Spanish sport shooter
- Jorge Eduardo Ballesteros, Mexican skier
- Juan Matta-Ballesteros, Honduran drug trafficker
- María Ballesteros, Mexican swimmer
- Miguel Jerónimo de Ballesteros (died 1555), Roman Catholic bishop
- Moisés Ballesteros, Venezuelan baseball player
- Paolo Ballesteros, Filipino actor
- Pío Ballesteros (1919–1995), Spanish writer, producer and director
- Rafael Ballesteros (born 1938), Spanish poet
- Roberto Ballesteros, Peruvian actor
- Sergio Martínez Ballesteros Spanish footballer
- Seve Ballesteros (1957–2011), Spanish golfer
