= Ballesteros =

Ballesteros may refer to:

== People ==
- Ballesteros (surname)

== Places ==
- Ballesteros, Cagayan, Philippine municipality
- Ballesteros de Calatrava, Spanish municipality
- San Sebastián de los Ballesteros, Spanish municipality
