= Names of the Valencian Community =

The names of the Valencian Community are diverse, even though Comunitat Valenciana ("Valencian Community") is the only denomination with official status in its Statute of Autonomy. Nonetheless, this legal document includes in its Preamble other legal denominations that portray the history and nature of the territory: Regne de València ("Kingdom of Valencia") and País Valencià ("Valencian Country" or "Land of Valencia").

== Denominations ==
Over the years, there have been several denominations both in Spanish and Valencian covering what today is the Valencian Community. The topic stems from the potentially ambiguous usage of Valencia, which may designate the city of Valencia, the Valencia province or the whole territory of the Valencian Community.

=== Kingdom of Valencia ===
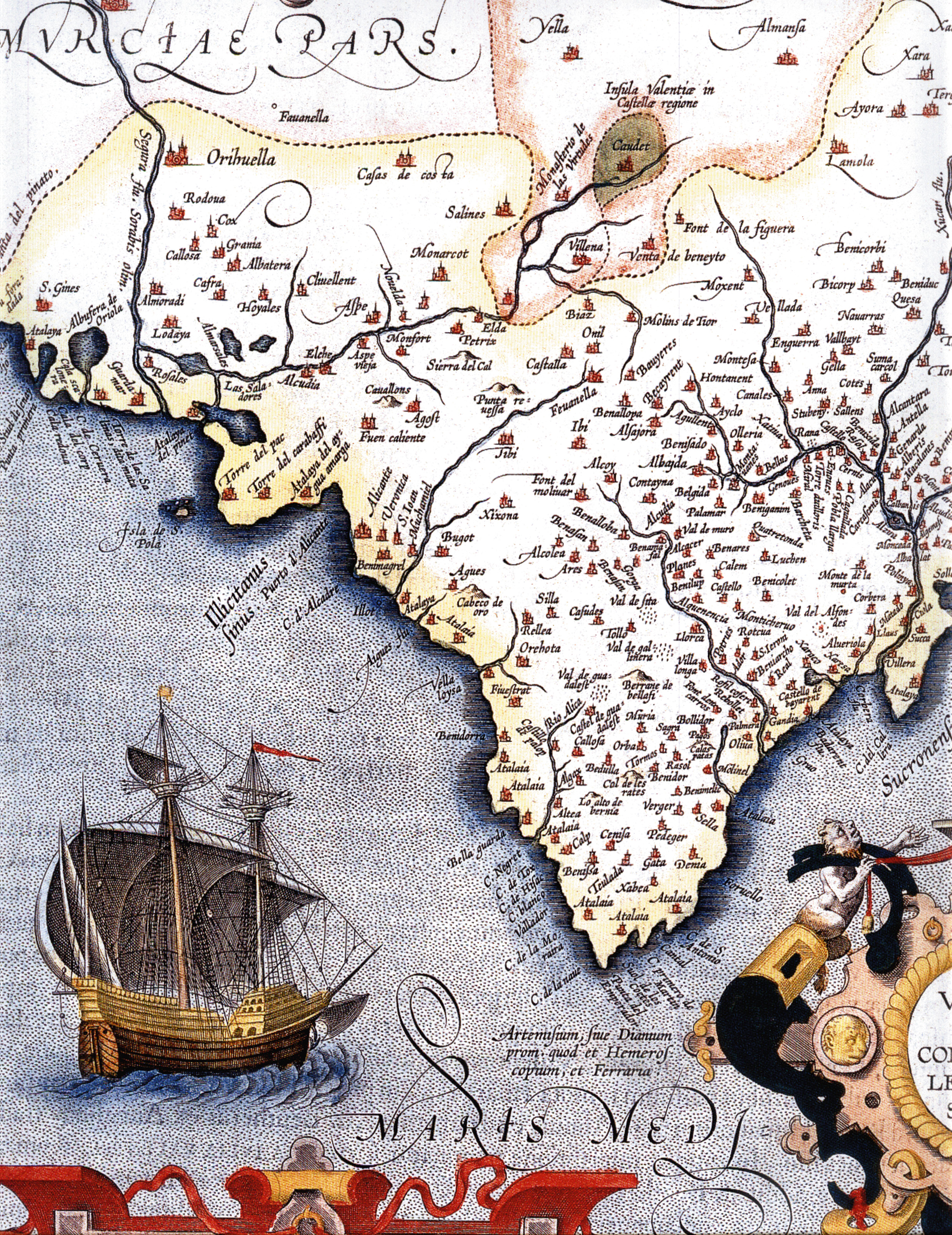
Map of the Kingdom of Valencia in the sixteenth century

"Kingdom of Valencia" refers to the conquered territory by the Christian Catalan and Aragonese troops commanded by king James I in 1238. The conquered territory was granted wide administrative, legal and political self-government within the structure of the Crown of Aragon as stipulated in the set of laws known first as Costums de Valencia. When these were transformed into the Furs of Valencia (Charters of Valencia), the autonomy was extended to all the Valencian territory. The furs (code of law), its administrative and legal structure, as well as its status as an autonomous political entity were dissolved in 1707, at the end of the War of the Spanish Succession by Philip V of Spain, with the promulgation of the Nueva Planta decrees, whereby the legislation and structure of the Kingdom of Castile were instituted in the territory.

Nevertheless, the Kingdom of Valencia denomination continued to be used locally during the eighteenth and nineteenth centuries, an example of which were the government divisions or Javier de Burgos's provincial division proposal. However, it was sometimes rendered as Antic Regne de Valencia ("Old Kingdom of Valencia") to clarify the non-existence of the kingdom as a legal or political entity. At the beginning of the twentieth century, the term was confined to the academic, cultural or literary domains, especially after the Valencian Renaixença and the nascent Valencian nationalism, which began to use the term along with País Valencià. During Franco's dictatorship the term was in disuse, only to be revived during the political transition toward democracy in Spain, concurrent with the transition towards Valencian autonomy, at the beginning of the 1980s, as well as by blaverism, which used it in opposition to the denomination País Valencià, adopted by the left-wing organizations.

Nowadays, the term "Kingdom of Valencia" is only used in the cultural or academic realms, even though it is included in the Preamble of the current Valencian Statute of Autonomy, as well as in its first article, in order to evocate the historical origin of what today constitutes the Valencian Community.

=== Valencian Country or Land of Valencia ===
País Valencià (rendered as "Valencian Country", "Valencian Region", or "Land of Valencia") – from the Valencian words País ("country" or "region") and Valencià ("Valencian") – was first recorded by 17th-century hagiographer Agustín Bella, in his work Vida de fra Agustín Antonio Pascual (1699). Valencian linguist and historian Manuel Sanchis i Guarner reports other instances of the term since the 18th century in his work La llengua dels valencians.

In these early usages, the term designated a merely geographic concept. Then, by the early twentieth century, Labor and Valencian nationalist movements picked up the term and gave it the modern cultural and political connotation. For example, the Joventuts Valencianistes (Valencianist Youth), in 1906 published a map of the comarques using this particular denomination. The term became popular during the 1930s, and was widely used in academic, cultural and political papers and publications, most notably the Quaderns d'Orientació Valencianista journal, published by Editorial Estel, nowadays edited by the University of Valencia.

It had a noticeable official usage during the Second Spanish Republic, as it reflects, by example, the use of the term from the Provincial Council of Valencia (present Provincial Delegation) in a poster made by Artur Ballester i Marco. Also a good sample of it can be seen its use in the different projects from statutes of autonomy of the CNT in 1936, of Valencian Left and Izquierda Republicana in 1937.

During the 1960s, after the publication of El País Valenciano, by Joan Fuster, the term became widely used again (during the dictatorship), to the point of being the most widely used term to refer to the territory in the media, most notably in the regional newspapers of various political ideologies, without any overt censorship from Franco's government, despite it being most likely a term mimicking País Vasco (Basque Country), thus trying to emphasize the perceived (for this term's users) "otherness" of the Valencian territory within Spain. When democracy was restored, the term was proposed in the Statute of Autonomy of the Parliamentary Assembly of the Valencian Country, on October 25, 1979. Before the ratification of the 1979 Statute of Autonomy, which coined the term "Valencian Community", the "Pre-autonomy Council of the Valencian Country" also used the term.

Even though the term was widely used, especially by the Democratic Center Union party (UCD), in the 1980s, the local right-wing politicians rejected the term, since they considered that its use would imply a political link to the "Catalan Countries" (in Valencian: Països Catalans). The last mayor of the city of Valencia before democracy, Miguel Ramón Izquierdo, justified the rejection of the term, since "país es singular de países, entonces se habla de un País Valenciano dentro de los Países Catalanes" ("country is the singular of countries, hence we are talking about a Valencian Country within the Catalan Countries").

Nowadays, the term is still used, mostly in academia, encyclopedias in Catalan (and occasionally in Spanish) in the names of streets, plazas and avenues, by some political parties (e.g. the United Left of the Valencian Country), labor unions (UGT-PV, CCOO-PV, etc.), and some nationalist-leaning media. The term may be even preferred to "Valencian Community" in some comarques, even though it is not the official denomination. The Partit Socialista del País Valencià, which is the local branch of the Spanish Socialist Workers' Party, currently the governing party at the regional parliament, keeps País Valencià in its name, but in its documents and public statements they use instead Comunitat Valenciana.

Both the 1982 and the 2006 Statutes of Autonomy included the term in the Preamble. The current Statute of Autonomy states that the "Valencian tradition coming from the historic Kingdom of Valencia met with the modern conception of the Valencian Country and produced the Valencian autonomy".

"Valencian Country" is one attempt at rendering the term País Valencià in English. Another rendition in English, also locally created, is "Land of Valencia". This appeared in Valencian tourist department advertising and, since then, has been used by some other travel publications in English. It is unclear whether the original term translated is Region Valenciana or País Valencià.

=== Valencian Region and Levante ===
"Valencian Region" (Valencian: Regió Valenciana) was a denomination that became majoritary during Franco's dictatorship, with the intention of emphasizing the intended nature of the territory under the political structure of the time: a region within Spain. In fact, before the twentieth century, several territories dominated by Spain were called "kingdoms", as a synonym of "country", in spite of the fact that they were not monarchies. From the nineteenth century onwards, the term "kingdom" began to be substituted by the term "region", especially in books which imitated the French regional geographical nomenclature. In that sense, "region" designated any state, country or nation (all previously used terms that designated the diverse territories of the Spanish Empire or under the king of Spain), regardless of their political and administrative nature of the territory, whereas "kingdom" was reserved to the particular State, country or nation governed by a monarch. Today, the concept of "region" does not refer to a particular political entity, but alludes to regional geography. Within the dictatorship, the term had a centralizing connotation and not simply a geographical meaning.

One more term which gained wide acceptance during the Francoist times was Levante, which roughly translates as "East", in a similar fashion to Levant in French. In Spanish, levante (llevant in Valencian) are easterly winds and, geographically speaking, anything coming from or originating in the east, such as the eastern slopes of a range (the western ones are called poniente).

In its attempt to homogenize the Spanish territory, the Francoist governments and media often used Levante to refer to the eastern Mediterranean coast of Spain. Since Catalonia had a well defined identity already, Levante came to designate, roughly, the territories which used to make the Kingdom of Valencia and, often, additionally the Región de Murcia. Since by population and extension, the Valencian Community is quite larger than the Región de Murcia, for some this term was narrowed to vaguely designate what today is the Valencian Community. The term may still be heard today, mainly informally, designating for example motorways names such as in Autovía de Levante. It remains in use also within private organizations such as companies, chiefly to designate a sales territory. Some public organizations such as the trade union CNT-FAI also use it for their territorial organization.

Also, the oldest newspaper in the Valencian Community, edited in the city of Valencia is called Levante-El Mercantil Valenciano. The football team Levante UD, from the city of Valencia and currently in the Spanish Primera División is also named in this fashion, even despite its name has origin in the Levante Beach (now Malva-rosa).

=== Valencian Community ===
The flag of the Agreement of Benicàssim

Current flag of Valencia

The term which has become official, "Valencian Community" (Comunitat Valenciana), was first used within the articles of the proposal of the Statute of Autonomy drafted by the Parliamentary Assembly in charge of forging the Statute, interchangeably with the term País Valencià. In this proposal, known as the Agreement of Benicàssim (Acord de Benicàssim), both the left-wing and right-wing parties reached a consensus regarding the symbols of the territory and soon-to-be autonomous community of Spain. The left-wing parties accepted as the flag of Valencia a senyera including a blue strip and the coat of arms of the generalitat, and the right-wing parties accepted the term País Valencià in the statute's preamble.

Nonetheless, when this proposal was presented before the Chamber of Deputies of Spain, consensus was broken; UCD did not comply with the Agreement of Benicàssim, and proposed to change the flag to include the crown in the blue strip, i.e., to use the flag of the city of Valencia as the flag of the whole territory, they also moved back to retain the term Regne de Valencia ("Kingdom of Valencia").

Given that center and right-wing political parties formed an absolute majority in the Congress, the Socialist Workers' Party (PSOE), reached a compromise with the UCD (by the proposal of deputy Emilio Attard), through which the term Regne de Valencia was replaced by Comunidad Valenciana ("Valencian Community", "community" as in "autonomous community") within the articles of the legal text, and the terms Regne de Valencia and País Valencià were included only as incidental mentions in the Preamble, so that whichever party was in power in a particular time would use whichever denomination it preferred.

Later on, by the mid and late 1980s, when the PSOE won absolute majorities both in the Spanish Parliament and the Valencian one, it decided to keep the existing solution unchanged rather than reopening the topic, which had been harshly fought over. The same stance has been followed by the PP. It has been under the latter's ruling that the name has been officially made Comunitat Valenciana (in Valencian), rather than the previous bilingual Spanish/Valencian (Comunidad/Comunitat Valenciana).

== References and external links ==
- del roig al blau: La transició valenciana. Documental del Taller d'Audiovisuals de la Universitat de València. Any 2004.
- El llarg camí cap a l'Autonomia Valenciana, de Vicente Ruiz Monrabal. Revista Valenciana d'Estudis autonòmics, núm. 41/42, 3^{er} trimestre de 2003 - 4o trimestre de 2003, p. 372-421. URL: Número 41/42.
- El valencianisme polític, 1874-1936, Alfons Cucó i Giner. 1999, Catarroja, Ed. Afers SL. ISBN 84-86574-73-0.
- Història del País Valencià, Vicente Boix. 1981. Editorial Planeta, ISBN 84-390-0148-7.
- Història del País Valencià, Antoni Furió i Diego. 2001. Edicions 3i4. ISBN 84-7502-631-1.
