= Ballestrero =

Ballestrero is an Italian surname. Notable people with the surname include:

- Anastasio Ballestrero (1913–1998), Italian cardinal
- Enrique Ballestrero (1905–1969), Uruguayan soccer player
- Massimo Ballestrero (1901–?), Italian rower

== See also ==
- Balestrero
