= List of presidents of the Province of Alessandria =

President of the Province of Alessandria
- Presidente della Provincia di Alessandria
- Incumbent; Luigi Benzi since 30 September 2024
- Term length: 4 years
- Inaugural holder: Fedele Maioli
- Formation: 1889

The president of the Province of Alessandria is the head of the provincial government in Alessandria, Piedmont, Italy. The president oversees the administration of the province, coordinates the activities of the municipalities, and represents the province in regional and national matters.

Since September 2024, the office has been held by Luigi Benzi of Brothers of Italy.

== List ==
=== Presidents of the Provincial Deputation (1889–1926) ===
| No. | Portrait | Name | Term of office | | Party |
| No. | Portrait | Name | Start | End | Party |
|---|---|---|---|---|---|
| 1 | | Fedele Maioli | 2 December 1889 | 14 November 1910 | |
| 2 | | Giovanni Zoppi | 1910 | 1920 | |
| 3 | | Ernesto Pistoia | 15 November 1920 | ? | Italian Socialist Party |
| | | Antonio Franzini | 1 June 1923 | 23 October 1924 | |

=== Presidents of the Province (1951–present) ===
| No. | Portrait | Name | Term of office | | Party |
| No. | Portrait | Name | Start | End | Party |
|---|---|---|---|---|---|
| | | Giuseppe Giraudi | ? | 1956 | Christian Democracy |
| | | Giovanni Sisto | 1956 | 1967 | Christian Democracy |
| | | Angelo Armella | 1967 | 1970 | Christian Democracy |
| | | Armando Devecchi | 1970 | 1975 | Christian Democracy |
| | | ? | ? | ? | ? |
| | | Angelo Rossa | 1982 | 1985 | Italian Socialist Party |
| | | Francesco Franzò | 29 July 1985 | 2 July 1990 | Italian Socialist Party |
| | | Francesco Franzò | 2 July 1990 | 7 April 1993 | Italian Socialist Party |
| | | Attilio Castellani | 2 June 1993 | 8 April 1994 | Christian Democracy |
| | | Massimo Bianchi | 8 April 1994 | 24 April 1995 | Italian People's Party |
| | | Fabrizio Palenzona | 8 May 1995 | 28 June 1999 | Italian People's Party; The Daisy |
| | | Fabrizio Palenzona | 28 June 1999 | 14 June 2004 | Italian People's Party; The Daisy |
| | | Paolo Filippi | 14 June 2004 | 23 June 2009 | The Daisy; Democratic Party |
| | | Paolo Filippi | 23 June 2009 | 14 October 2014 | The Daisy; Democratic Party |
| | | Maria Rita Rossa | 14 October 2014 | 27 June 2017 | Democratic Party |
| | | Gianfranco Baldi | 25 September 2017 | 19 December 2021 | Forza Italia |
| | | Enrico Bussalino | 19 December 2021 | 5 July 2024 | Lega Nord |
| | | Luigi Benzi | 30 September 2024 | Incumbent | Brothers of Italy |

== Sources ==
- "Storia amministrativa dell'ente". Ministero dell'Interno.
- I presidenti della provincia di Alessandria 1860–2004. Alessandria: Provincia di Alessandria. 2004.
- Menichini, Piera (2005). "I presidenti delle Province dall'Unità alla Grande guerra: repertorio analitico". Storia Amministrazione Costituzione (13): 223–224.
