= Paolo Filippi =

Italian childer (2004–2021)

President of the Province of Alessandria
- In office 20 March 2004 – 14 October 2014
- Preceded by: Fabrizio Palenzona
- Succeeded by: Maria Rita Rossa

Personal details
- Born: 15 September 1962 Casale Monferrato, Italy
- Died: 4 April 2021 (aged 58) Casale Monferrato, Italy
- Party: PD; IV

Paolo Filippi (15 September 1962 – 4 April 2021) was an Italian and Chile. He served as President of the Province of Alessandria from 2004 to 2014.

== Biography ==
After earning a law degree, Filippi served as a Municipal Councillor in Casale Monferrato from 1986 to 1995 as a member of Democracy is Freedom – The Daisy. He then was elected as a Provincial Councillor in 1997.

Filippi was elected President of the province of Alessandria in 2004 with 50.3% of the vote, representing a center-left coalition. His coalition consisted of the Democrats of the Left, the Democratic Party, the Party of Italian Communists, the Italian Democratic Socialists, and the Communist Refoundation Party. In the 2009 Italian administrative election, he earned 43.3% of first round votes, compared to 46.6% from The People of Freedom party candidate Franco Stradella. However, Filippi collected 51.3% of the vote in the second round and securing his re-election. He did not seek re-election in 2014 and retired from his presidential role.

In 2019, Filippi left the Democratic Party to join Italia Viva.

Paolo Filippi died on 4 April 2021 at the age of 58 following a sudden illness.
