= Giorgio Abonante =

Italian politician (born 1975)

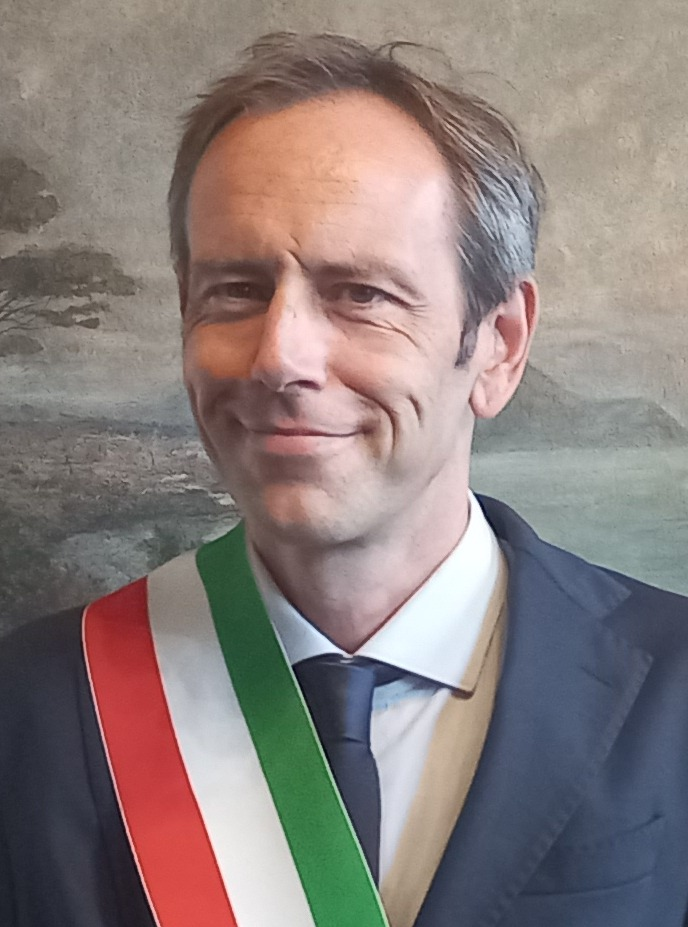

Mayor of Alessandria
- Incumbent
- Assumed office 27 June 2022
- Preceded by: Gianfranco Cuttica di Revigliasco

Personal details
- Born: Giorgio Angelo Abonante; August 27, 1975 (age 50) Alessandria, Italy
- Party: PD (since 2007)
- Other political affiliations: DS (until 2007)
- Children: 2
- Education: University of Eastern Piedmont
- Profession: Employee

Giorgio Angelo Abonante (born August 27, 1975) is an Italian politician and the current mayor of Alessandria.

== Life and career ==
Giorgio Angelo Abonante was born on August 27, 1975 in Alessandria, Italy. He attended the "Alessandro Volta" Industrial Technical Institute and then graduated in political science at University of Eastern Piedmont. He then obtained a first-level master's degree in local development at the same university.

Abonante started his political career when he joined Democrats of the Left Party, which he later changed to Democratic Party. He was elected as the municipal councilor of Alexssandria in 2007 and also in 2012 and 2017 rounds of elections.He was the councilor responsible for the budget and financial planning from 2014 to 2017 in the board chaired by the previous mayor Maria Rita Rossa. In the 2010 Piedmontese regional election, he ran in the district of Alessandria but only obtained 2,480 votes, being unelected.

In the 2022 Italian local elections, Abonante announces his candidacy for the office of mayor of Alessandria representing the center-left coalition. After obtaining 42.04% in the first round, he wins the runoff against the center-right candidate and outgoing mayor Gianfranco Cuttica di Revigliasco with 54.41% of the votes, winning the election.

Political offices
Preceded by Gianfranco Cuttica di Revigliasco	Mayor of Alessandria; 2022–present	Succeeded by
