= Pietro Balestra =

Pietro Balestra may refer to:

- Pietro Balestra (sculptor) (c. 1672 – after 1729), Italian sculptor
- Pietro Balestra (economist) (1935–2005), Swiss economist
