= Balestra (surname) =

Balestra is a surname. Notable people with the surname include:

- Alda Balestra, Italian model
- Antonio Balestra (1666–1740), Italian painter of the Rococo period
- Giovanni Balestra (1774–1842), Italian engraver
- Pietro Balestra (economist) (1935–2005), Swiss economist
- Pietro Balestra (sculptor) (c. 1672–after 1729), Italian sculptor of the late Baroque period
- Renato Balestra (1924–2022), Italian fashion designer
