= Fabio Porta =

Italian politician (born 1963)

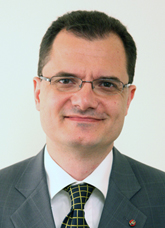
- Porta in 2008

Member of the Chamber of Deputies
- Incumbent
- Assumed office 13 October 2022
- Constituency: South America
- In office 29 April 2008 – 22 March 2018
- Constituency: South America

Member of the Senate
- In office 12 January 2022 – 13 October 2022
- Preceded by: Adriano Cario
- Constituency: South America

Personal details
- Born: 5 November 1963 (age 62)
- Party: Democratic Party

Fabio Porta (born 5 November 1963) is an Italian politician. He has been a member of the Chamber of Deputies since 2022, having previously served from 2008 to 2018. From January to October 2022, he was a member of the Senate.
