= Amaele Abbiati =

Italian politician

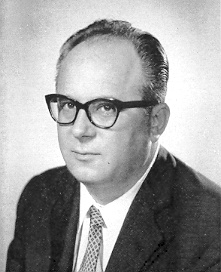

Personal details
- Born: 18 January 1925
- Died: 5 January 2016 (aged 90)

Amaele Abbiati (18 January 1925 – 5 January 2016) was an Italian politician who served as mayor of Alessandria from 1964 to 1967 and as a member of the Chamber of Deputy (1968–1972).

Political offices
Preceded by Nicola Basile	Mayor of Alessandria; 1964–1967	Succeeded by Piero Magrassi
