= List of mayors of Alessandria =

Mayor of Alessandria
- Sindaco di Alessandria

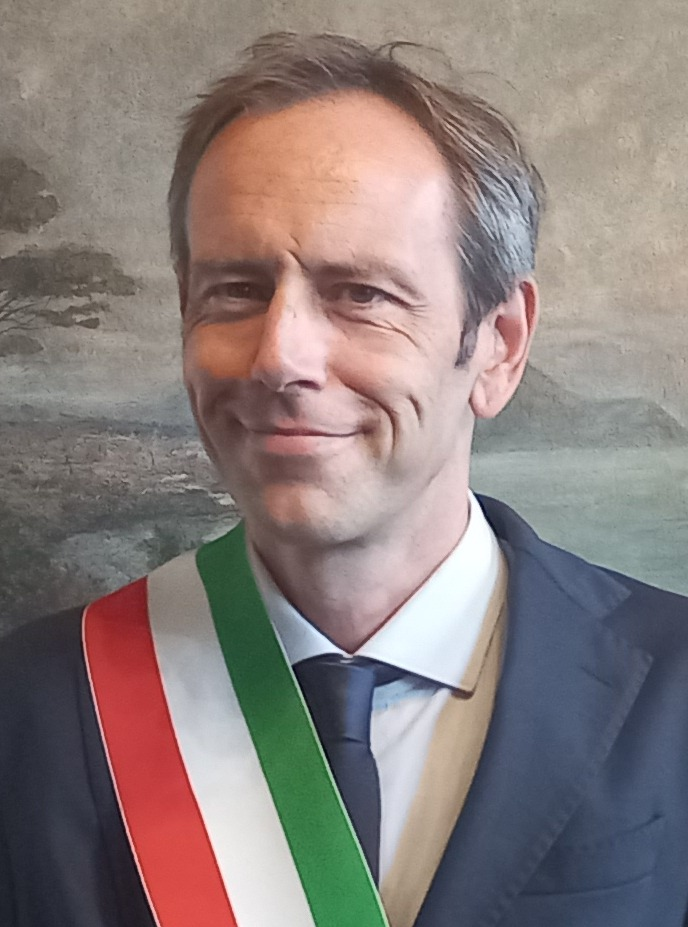
- Incumbent; Giorgio Abonante (PD) since 28 June 2022
- Appointer: Popular election
- Term length: 5 years, renewable once
- Formation: 1848
- Website: Official website

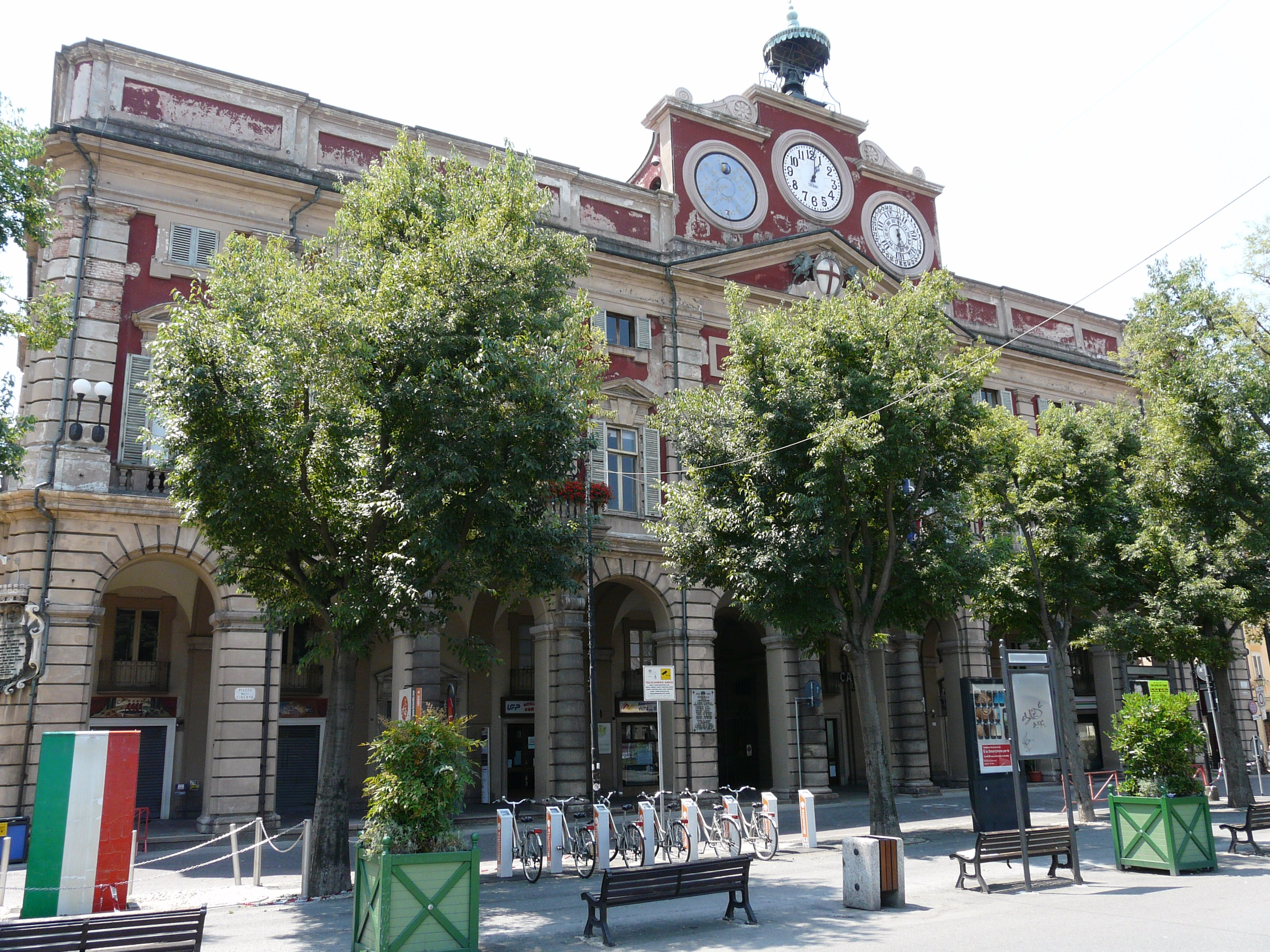
Palazzo del Municipio is the seat of the Mayor of Alessandria.

The mayor of Alessandria is an elected politician who, along with the Alessandria's city council, is accountable for the strategic government of Alessandria in Piedmont, Italy.

The current mayor is Giorgio Abonante (PD), who took office on 28 June 2022.

== Overview ==
According to the Italian Constitution, the mayor of Alessandria is member of the city council.

The mayor is elected by the population of Alessandria, who also elects the members of the city council, controlling the mayor's policy guidelines and is able to enforce his resignation by a motion of no confidence. The mayor is entitled to appoint and release the members of his government.

Since 1993 the mayor is elected directly by Alessandria's electorate: in all mayoral elections in Italy in cities with a population higher than 15,000 the voters express a direct choice for the mayor or an indirect choice voting for the party of the candidate's coalition. If no candidate receives at least 50% of votes, the top two candidates go to a second round after two weeks. The election of the City Council is based on a direct choice for the candidate with a preference vote: the candidate with the majority of the preferences is elected. The number of the seats for each party is determined proportionally.

== Republic of Italy (since 1946) ==
=== City Council election (1946–1993) ===
From 1946 to 1993, the Mayor of Alessandria was elected by the City Council.

| | Mayor | Term start | Term end | Party |
|---|---|---|---|---|
| 1 | Giuseppe Moccagatta | 1946 | 1946 | PSI |
| 2 | Giovanni Porta | 1946 | 1947 | PSI |
| 3 | Nicola Basile | 1947 | 1964 | PSI |
| 4 | Amaele Abbiati | 1964 | 1967 | PSI |
| 5 | Piero Magrassi | 1967 | 1972 | PSI |
| 6 | Felice Borgoglio | 1972 | 1979 | PSI |
| 7 | Francesco Barrera | 1979 | 1985 | PSI |
| 8 | Giuseppe Mirabelli | 1985 | 1991 | PSI |
| 9 | Giovanni Battista Priano | 1991 | 1992 | PSI |
| 10 | Gian Luca Veronesi | 1992 | 1993 | PSI |
| – | Cosimo Vincenzo Macrì | 1993 | 1993 | Prefectural commissioner |

=== Direct election (since 1993) ===
Since 1993, under provisions of new local administration law, the Mayor of Alessandria is chosen by popular election, originally every four and since 1997 every five years.

| | Mayor | Term start | Term end | Party | Coalition | Election |
|---|---|---|---|---|---|---|
| 11 | Francesca Calvo | 6 December 1993 | 1 December 1997 | LN | LN | 1993 |
| 11 | Francesca Calvo | 1 December 1997 | 10 June 2002 | LN | LN | 1997 |
| 12 | Mara Scagni | 10 June 2002 | 28 May 2007 | DS | DS • DL • PdCI | 2002 |
| 13 | Piercarlo Fabbio | 28 May 2007 | 21 May 2012 | FI | FI • AN • LN • UDC | 2007 |
| 14 | Maria Rita Rossa | 21 May 2012 | 27 June 2017 | PD | PD • IdV • SEL • FdS | 2012 |
| 15 | Gianfranco Cuttica di Revigliasco | 27 June 2017 | 28 June 2022 | LN | FI • LN • FdI | 2017 |
| 16 | Giorgio Abonante | 28 June 2022 | Incumbent | PD | PD • M5S | 2022 |
