= Francisca (given name) =

- Gender: Female

Other gender
- Masculine: Francisco

Francisca is a feminine given name, the masculine form being Francisco. It is also related to many other names, such as Frances, Francis, Françoise, and Franz. It originated from the Germanic languages, before changing in form and meaning through Medieval Latin and into Spanish.

== Etymology and meanings ==
Francisca is the feminine form of Francisco, which derives from the Latin given name Franciscus.

Francisca derives from the Medieval Latin Francus / Franciscus, meaning "belonging to the people of the Franks", a Germanic people of central Europe. The Franks derived their tribal name from a type of throwing axe, known as a francisca, that they used as a weapon during the early Middle Ages. The Franks were the only tribe who had rights of free citizens in the Middle Ages, so the term frank came to mean a free, sincere, or true. The word came from the Germanic word frankô (or franka), which referred to a weapon like a javelin or spear. Before this, in Proto-Germanic the word was sahsą, meaning "knife" or "dagger".

Paquita is a Spanish diminutive form of Francisca.

== People ==
Notable people with the name include:

- Francisca Ballesteros (born 1969), Spanish serial killer
- Maria Francisca Bia (1809-1889), Dutch dancer, singer, and actress
- Ana Francisca de Borja y Doria (1640-1706), first female governor of the Viceroyalty of Peru
- Francisca Duarte (1595–1640), Portuguese singer
- Francisca Campos (born 1985), Chilean mountain biker
- Francisca del Espiritu Santo Fuentes (1647-1711), Filipina religious leader
- Francisca Martínez (born 1966), Mexican race walker
- Francisca Motta (born 1940), Brazilian historian and politician
- Francisca Nuñez de Carabajal (circa 1540-1596), victim of the Inquisition
- Francisca Nneka Okeke, Nigerian physicist
- Francisca Pleguezuelos (born 1950), Spanish politician
- Francisca Queiroz (born 1979), Brazilian actress
- Francisca Rojas (born 1865), Argentine murderer
- Francisca Sarasate (1853-1922), Spanish writer
- Francisca Senhorinha da Motta Diniz, Brazilian teacher and feminist
- Francisca Stading (1763-1836), Swedish opera singer
- Francisca Subirana (1900–1981), Spanish tennis player
- Fransisca Saraswati Puspa Dewi (born 2000), Indonesian actress, singer, dancer, and presenter
- Francisca Wieser (1869–1949), American scientific illustrator
- Dilian Francisca Toro (born 1959), Colombian doctor and politician
- Francisca Urio (born 1981), German singer-songwriter and radio presenter
- Infanta Francisca Josefa of Portugal (1699-1736), Portuguese princess
- Infanta Maria Francisca of Portugal (1800-1834), daughter of King John VI of Portugal and Carlota Joaquina of Borbón
- Infanta Mariana Francisca of Portugal (1736-1813), Portuguese princess
- Maria Francisca of Nemours (1646-1683), Queen of Portugal
- Princess Francisca of Brazil (1824-1898), Brazilian princess and Portuguese infanta

== Fictional characters ==
- Francisca, from Kirby Star Allies
- Franziska von Karma, from Ace Attorney

== See also ==
- Francesca
