= Gianfranco Cuttica di Revigliasco =

Italian professor and politician

Mayor of Alessandria
- In office 27 June 2017 – 28 June 2022
- Preceded by: Maria Rita Rossa
- Succeeded by: Giorgio Abonante

Personal details
- Born: 30 June 1957 (age 68) Turin, Piedmont, Italy
- Party: Lega Nord
- Profession: professor

Gianfranco Cuttica di Revigliasco (born 30 June 1957 in Turin) is an Italian professor and politician.

He is a member of Lega Nord and served as Mayor of Alessandria from 27 June 2017 to 28 June 2022.

== See also ==
- 2017 Italian local elections
- 2022 Italian local elections
- List of mayors of Alessandria

Political offices
Preceded by Maria Rita Rossa	Mayor of Alessandria; 2017-2022	Succeeded by Giorgio Abonante
