= Luigi Benzi =

Italian politician (born 1974)

President of the Province of Alessandria
- Incumbent
- Assumed office 30 September 2024
- Preceded by: Enrico Bussalino

Mayor of Quargnento
- Incumbent
- Assumed office 24 June 2024
- Preceded by: Paola Porzio
- In office 14 June 2004 – 27 May 2019
- Preceded by: Giancarlo Luigi Ceriana
- Succeeded by: Paola Porzio

Personal details
- Born: 15 July 1974 (age 52) Turin, Piedmont, Italy
- Party: Brothers of Italy
- Occupation: Engineer

Luigi Benzi (born 15 July 1974) is an Italian politician and engineer serving as president of the Province of Alessandria since 2024. He has been mayor of Quargnento since 2024, having previously served from 2004 to 2019.

In September 2024, Benzi, supported by the Brothers of Italy, Lega and Forza Italia, was elected president of the Province of Alessandria. He received 42,314 weighted votes, narrowly defeating Domenico Miloscio, the centre-left candidate supported by the Democratic Party, Five Star Movement, Italia Viva, Action and civic lists, who received 41,940 weighted votes.
