= Quargnento =

Quargnento Quargnent (Piedmontese)
- Comune
- Comune di Quargnento
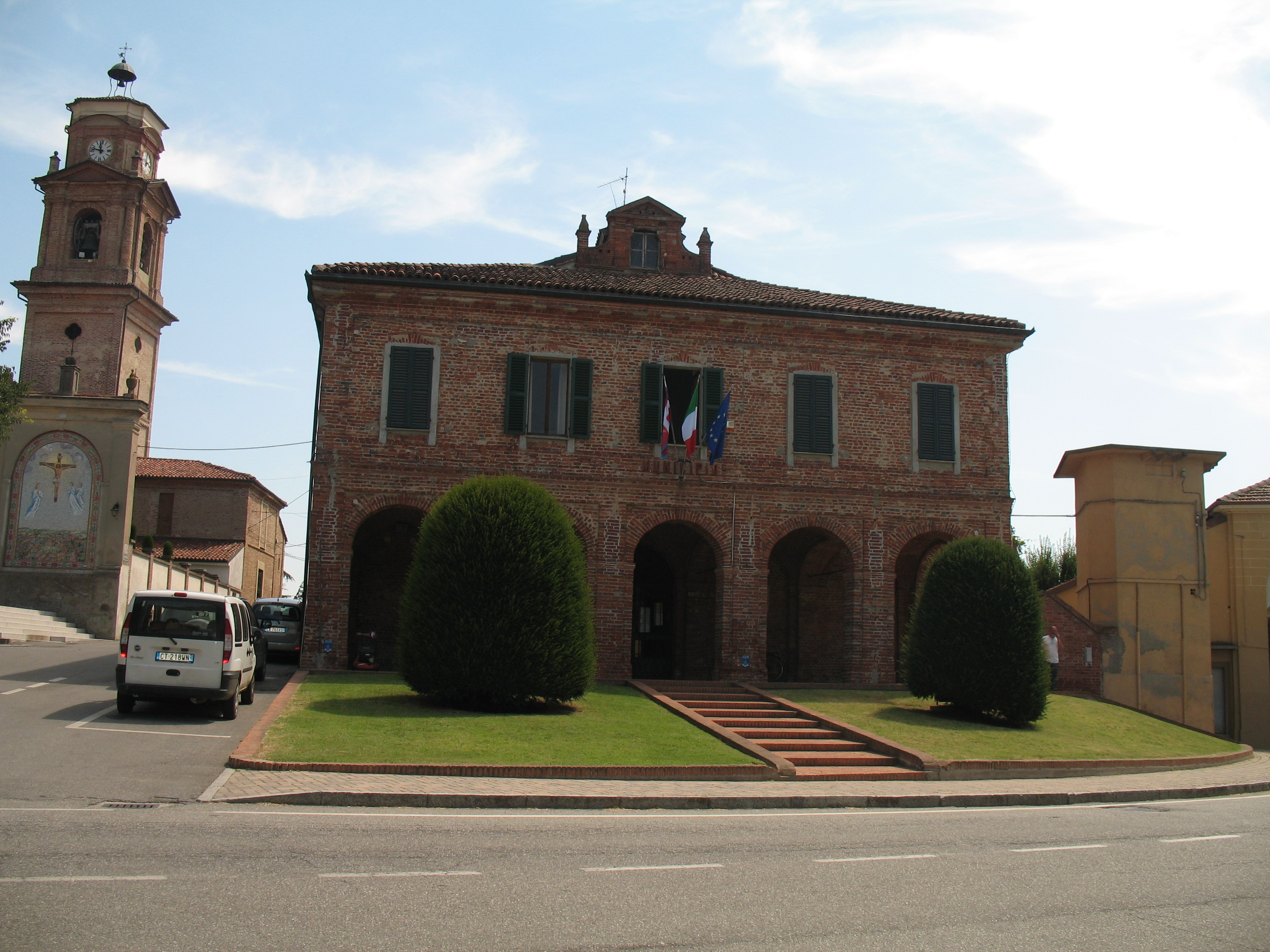
- Town Hall

- Coat of arms

- Location within Italy Location within Piedmont
- Coordinates: 44°56′45″N 8°29′17″E
- Country: Italy
- Region: Piedmont
- Province: Alessandria (AL)

Government
  - Mayor: Luigi Benzi

Area
  - Total: 36.2 km^{2} (14.0 sq mi)
- Elevation: 121 m (397 ft)

Population (2005)
  - Total: 1,334
  - Density: 36.9/km^{2} (95.4/sq mi)
- Demonym: Quargnentini
- Time zone: UTC+1 (CET)
  - Summer (DST): UTC+2 (CEST)
- Postal code: 15044
- Dialing code: 0131
- Patron saint: San Dalmazio
- Saint day: 5 December

Quargnento (Italian: [kwarˈɲɛnto]; Piedmontese: Quargnent) is a comune (municipality) in the province of Alessandria, in the Italian region of Piedmont, located about 60 kilometres (37 mi) east of Turin and about 11 kilometres (7 mi) northwest of Alessandria.

It is home to a notable Catholic basilica, San Dalmazio.

== Twin towns – sister cities ==
Quargnento is twinned with:

- Coubon, France
