= Balestra =

Balestra may refer to:

- Balestra (surname), a list of people
- Palazzo Muti or Balestra, a 1644 townhouse in Rome
- Balestra, an Italian Navy Ariete-class torpedo boat of World War II
- In fencing, a forward jump followed by a lunge
- Balestra Capital Management, a hedge fund manager founded by James Melcher
- A synonym for Grignolino, a variety of wine grape
