= Piercarlo Fabbio =

Italian politician (born 1955)

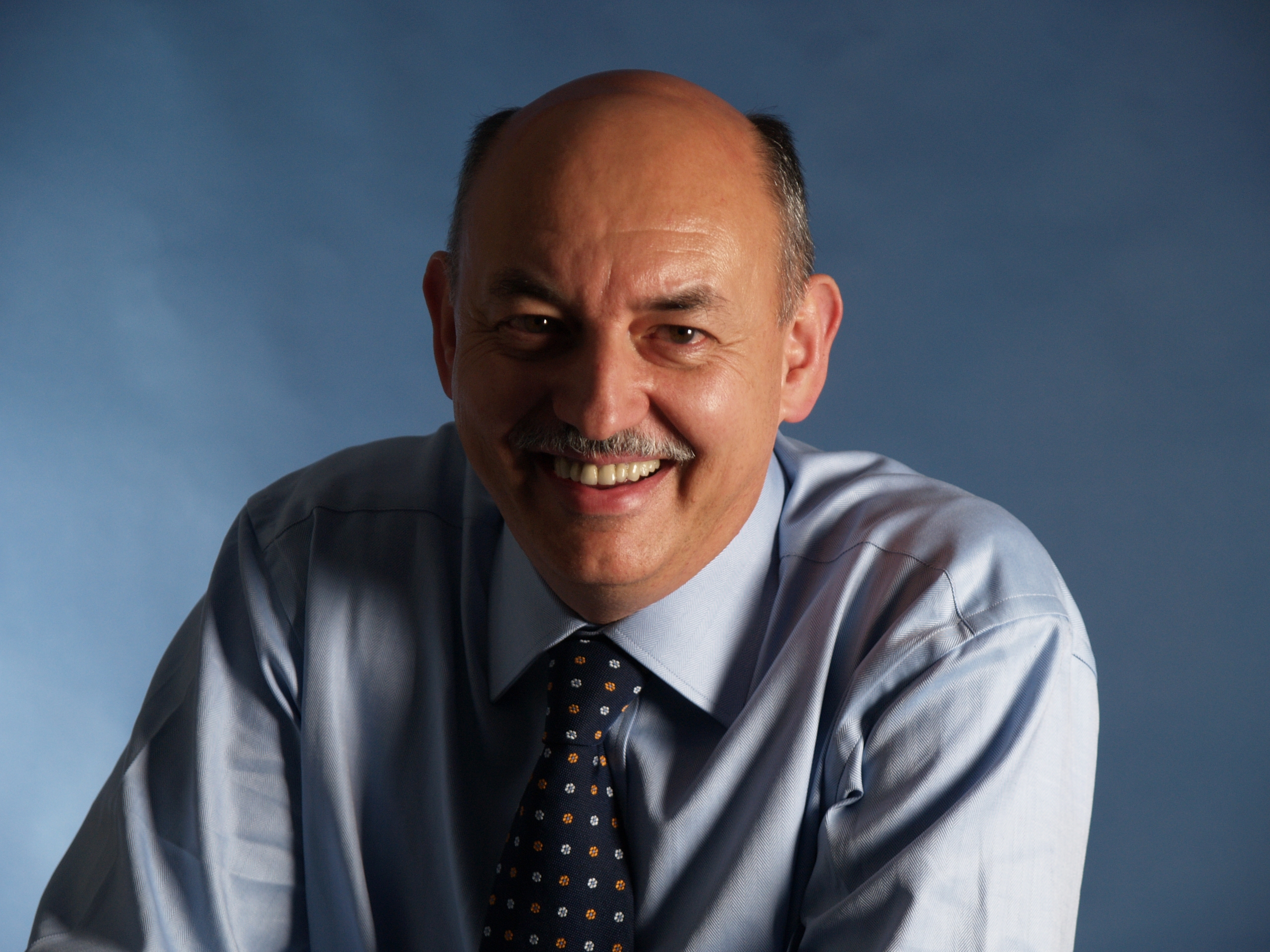

Mayor of Alessandria
- In office 29 May 2007 – 22 May 2012
- Preceded by: Mara Scagni
- Succeeded by: Maria Rita Rossa

Personal details
- Born: April 27, 1955 (age 71) Alessandria, Italy
- Party: UdC (since 2022)
- Other political affiliations: DC (since 1994); PPI (1994-1995); CDU (1995–1998); FI (1998–2009); PdL (2009–2013); FI (2013–2021)
- Education: University of Turin
- Profession: Teacher, writer, journalist

Piercarlo Fabbio (born April 27, 1955) is an Italian politician, teacher, writer and journalist. He was the mayor of Alessandria from 2007 to 2012.

== Life and career ==
Piercarlo Fabbio was born on April 27, 1955, in Alessandria. He graduated in literature at University of Turin. Between 1970 and 1978, he has collaborated with radio Alessandria International, then with Radio Gamma, and then with Radio BBSI.

In 1979, Fabbio began his career as a literature teacher and then held the role of director responsible for the "Foglio di Fabbio". In 1994, he became director of the newspaper of Radio BBSI, which ended in 2007. He collaborates with Radio Voce Spazio of Alessandria, participating every week since 1995 in the program Tutto per tutti.

From 2011 to 2012, Fabbio collaborated with Radio Alex, hosting a weekly program, created by Albino Neri, on the history of AlessandriaLa mia cara Alessandria. Since June 2012 the broadcast passes on Radio BBSI.

In 2019, Fabbio became provincial president of the Christian Workers Movement of Alessandria and National Councillor, and then took on the role of president of the Scientific Technical Committee of the Ethnographic Museum C'era una volta of Alessandria, He is the founder and coordinator of the Cathedra Alexandriæ.

== Political career ==
Fabbio started his political career in the 1970s, He first joined the Christian Democracy. He was President of the City Council from 1997 to 2002. In 2002, he was elected as the city councilor of Alessandria with over 1,600 votes, making him the most voted City Councilor in the city's history. In 2007, he was elected as the mayor of Alessandria for House of Freedoms in the municipal elections in 2007, he won in the first round with 63% of the votes. His term ended in 2012.

Fabbio was involved in a legal case connected to the calculation of the 2010 stability pact, following a complaint from the former mayor of Alessandria. He received a three-year sentence for ideological forgery. In 2018, he was granted probationary social service instead of prison detention.

Fabbio ran again in the 2012 elections, supported by The People of Freedom and some civic lists. The Northern League, which had presented its own candidate in the first round, supported him in the runoff. Since May 2012, he has been President of the PDL-FI council group in the Municipality of Alessandria, and from 2009 to 2014, he was the PDL-FI group leader in the Province of Alessandria. He resigned from the Alessandria City Council on November 21, 2016, after 32 years of service.

Political offices
Preceded by Mara Scagni	Mayor of Alessandria; 2007–2012	Succeeded by Maria Rita Rossa
