= Paquita (name) =

Paquita is a given name of Spanish origin, a diminutive of the name Francisca, which is the feminine form of Francisco, which derives from the Latin given name Franciscus.

Francisca derives from the Medieval Latin Francus / Franciscus, meaning "belonging to the people of the Franks", a Germanic people of central Europe. The Franks derived their tribal name from a type of throwing axe, known as a francisca, that they used as a weapon during the early Middle Ages. The Franks were the only tribe who had rights of free citizens in the Middle Ages, so the term frank came to mean a free, sincere, or true. The word came from the Germanic word frankô (or franka), which referred to a weapon like a javelin or spear. Before this, in Proto-Germanic the word was sahsą, meaning "knife" or "dagger".

== People ==
People with the given name Paquita include:

- Paquita la del Barrio (1947–2025), Mexican singer
- Paquita Bernardo (1900–1925), Argentine tango composer and first professional female bandoneon player of Argentine tango
- Paquita Madriguera (1900–1965), Catalan pianist and composer based in Uruguay
- Paquita Mawson (1891–1974), Australian community worker, wife of geologist and Antarctic explorer Sir Douglas Mawson
- Paquita Sabrafen (1931–2009), Spanish painter who specialised in portraits
- Paquita Sauquillo (born 1943), Spanish lawyer and politician

== See also ==
- Paquita, a 19th-century French ballet
