= Gian Luca Veronesi =

Italian politician (born 1950)

Mayor of Alessandria
- In office September 25, 1992 – February 24, 1993
- Preceded by: Giovanni Battista Priano
- Succeeded by: Francesca Calvo

Personal details
- Born: May 11, 1950 Alessandria, Italy
- Party: PSI
- Profession: Manager

Gian Luca Veronesi (born May 11, 1950) is an Italian politician and business manager. He was the mayor of Alessandria from 1992 to 1993.

== Life and career ==
Gian Luca Veronesi was born on May 11, 1950, in Alessandria. He graduated in political science and began working for RAI in 1988 as head of public relations. He was once the CEO of RaiSat.

Veronesi was elected several times as the city council before being elected as the mayor in 1992, his mayor term ended in 1993.

Veronesi retired from being CEO of RaiSat in 2018. He was also a consultant to the Institute of Advertising Self-Discipline.

Political offices
Preceded by Giovanni Battista Priano	Mayor of Alessandria; 1993–2002	Succeeded by Francesca Calvo
