= Mara Scagni =

Italian politician (born 1955)

Mayor of Alessandria
- In office 11 June 2002 – 29 May 2007
- Preceded by: Francesca Calvo
- Succeeded by: Piercarlo Fabbio

Personal details
- Born: July 15, 1955 (age 71) Alessandria, Italy
- Party: Independent (since 2012)
- Other political affiliations: PCI (1987–1991); PDS (1991–1998); DS (1998–2007); PD (2007–2012)
- Education: University of Turin
- Profession: Official

Mara Scagni (born July 15, 1955) is an Italian politician and the mayor of Alessandria from 2002 to 2007.

== Life and career ==
Mara Scagni was born on July 15, 1955, in Alessandria. She graduated in foreign languages and literature at University of Turin. She got a job as an employee at Cassa di Risparmio di Alessandria.

Scagni started her political career in 1987, when she joined Italian Communist Party. In 1995, she was elected as the Provincial Council of Alessandria, where she served as group leader for her party until 1997, when she was appointed councilor. She was re-elected in 1999, she was again chosen as provincial councilor for Public Education and Sport.

In 2002, Scagni was elected as the mayor of Alessandria with 53.9% of the votes. She ran again for the office of mayor of Alessandria in the 2007 municipal elections, but lost against her opponent Piercarlo Fabbio.

Since 2021, she has become the regional secretary of Piedmont for Cittadinanzattiva, a non-profit organization that deals with citizens' rights.

== Personal life ==
On June 6, 2005, she was involved in a motorcycle accident near Bologna on a Municipal Police vehicle to attend a meeting with Romano Prodi. The crash resulted in chest trauma and numerous fractures.

Political offices
Preceded by Francesca Calvo	Mayor of Alessandria; 2002–2007	Succeeded by Piercarlo Fabbio
