= Felice Borgoglio =

Italian politician (born 1941)

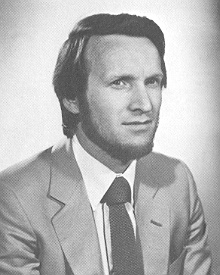
- Borgoglio in 1979

Personal details
- Born: 11 August 1941 (age 84) Alessandria, Kingdom of Italy

Felice Borgoglio (born 11 August 1941) is an Italian politician who served as Mayor of Alessandria from 1972 to 1979 and as a member of the Chamber of Deputies for four legislatures (1979–1983, 1983–1987, 1987–1992, 1992–1994).
