= Fabrizio Palenzona =

Italian politician

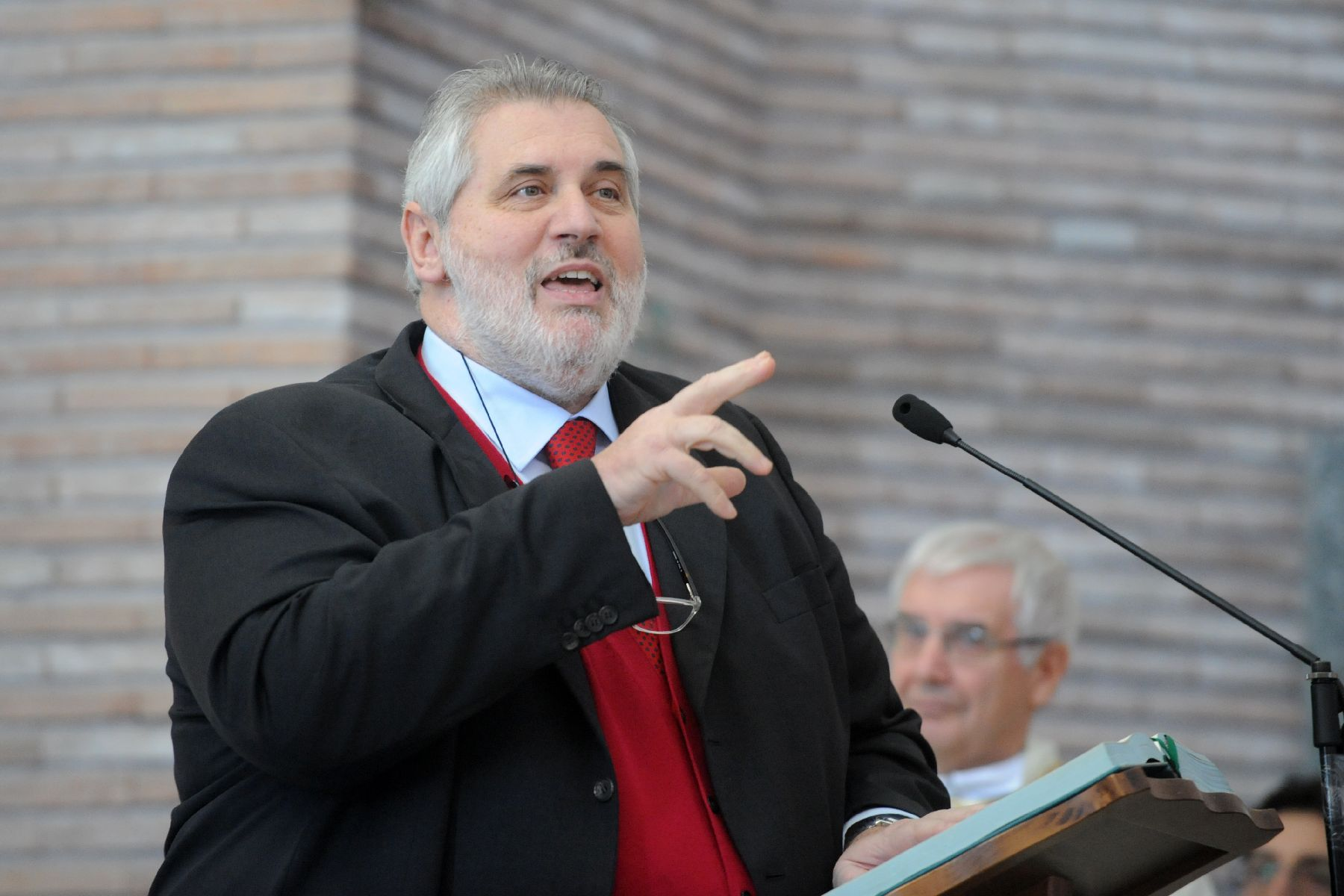
Fabrizio Palenzona

Fabrizio Palenzona (born in Novi Ligure, September 1, 1953) is a company executive, banker and Italian politician, past president of ASECAP, president of Gemina, Italian Association of Motorway and Tunnel Concessionaire Companies (AISCAT), of Aeroporti di Roma (ADR), on the board of directors of Mediobanca and vice president of Unicredit.

== Biography ==
Fabrizio Palenzona is married and has two children.

After completing his degree in law at the University of Pavia, he began his professional career in 1981 as a member of the board of directors of Unitra carl, assuming the same position with Unitra srl in 1987. Today, in addition to being vice-president of UniCredit, he is president of Gemina, Italian Association of Motorway and Tunnel Concessionaire Companies (AISCAT), Aeroporti di Roma (ADR), Aviva Italia and Assaeroporti, and is on the board of directors of Mediobanca, ABI and Fondazione Cassa di Risparmio di Alessandria.

== Political career ==
He joined ACLI and later the Christian Democrats. From 1985 to 1995 he was mayor of Tortona, then in the same year he became part of the provincial council of Alessandria. After the Christian Democrats were dissolved, he joined the Daisy party and from 1995 to 2004 he was President of the Province of Alessandria.

== Honours ==
- Commander of the Order of Merit of the Italian Republic

11 June 1993.

- Knight of the Order of Merit for Labour

31 May 2004
