= Rachel Aberlin =

Jewish mystic

- Other name: Rachel ha-Ashkenaziah
- Occupation: Mystic
- Spouse: Judah Aberlin

Rachel Aberlin, or Rachel ha-Ashkenaziah (fl. 1582–1609), was a Jewish mystic. She is described in the Sefer ha-Ḥezyonot ("The Book of Visions") by Hayyim Vital. She was an influential figure of the early Sabbateanism and a spiritual leader of women.

Her brother was R. Judah Mishan, a well-known mystic, and her family is believed to have been from Safed.

In 1564, she married Judah Aberlin, a man who had been born in Salonika but moved to Safed, becoming a leader of the Ashkenazi Jewish community of Safed in Jerusalem and Damascus. After his death in 1582, she acted as a patron of famous mystics within the Jewish community (such as Hayyim ben Joseph Vital, with whom she was very close), establishing a court for mystics to study and practice within. She herself was a leading mystical figure, particularly known for regularly experiencing mystical visions, from pillars of fire to Elijah the Prophet.

In Sefer ha-Ḥezyonot, Aberlin is depicted as a woman who frequently had mystical experiences, ranging from seeing pillars of fire to encountering Elijah the Prophet. She was reportedly "accustomed to seeing visions, demons, souls, and angels," and made prophecies of the future.

Her date of death is not recorded but she made an intervention in a case of spirit possession involving a young woman in Damascus in 1609.

== See also ==
- Francesa Sarah of Safed
