= Xaverio Ballester =

Spanish linguist

- Born: Francisco Javier Ballester Gómez
- Citizenship: Spain
- Occupations: Linguist, profesor
- Known for: Paleolithic continuity theory

Xaverio Ballester (full name in Spanish transcription: Francisco Javier Ballester Gómez) is a Spanish linguist, professor at University of Valencia and one of main proponents of Paleolithic continuity theory (aka Paleolithic continuity paradigm).

== Career ==
Ballester obtained a PhD in Classical Philology at the University of Barcelona in 1987. His subsequent teaching positions include: Professor titular of Latin Philology in the University of Zaragoza (1989); Professor of Latin Philology in the University of Valencia (1997); Professor of Latin Philology in the University of La Laguna (1997, resign). Ballester is also co-editor of the journal Liburna.

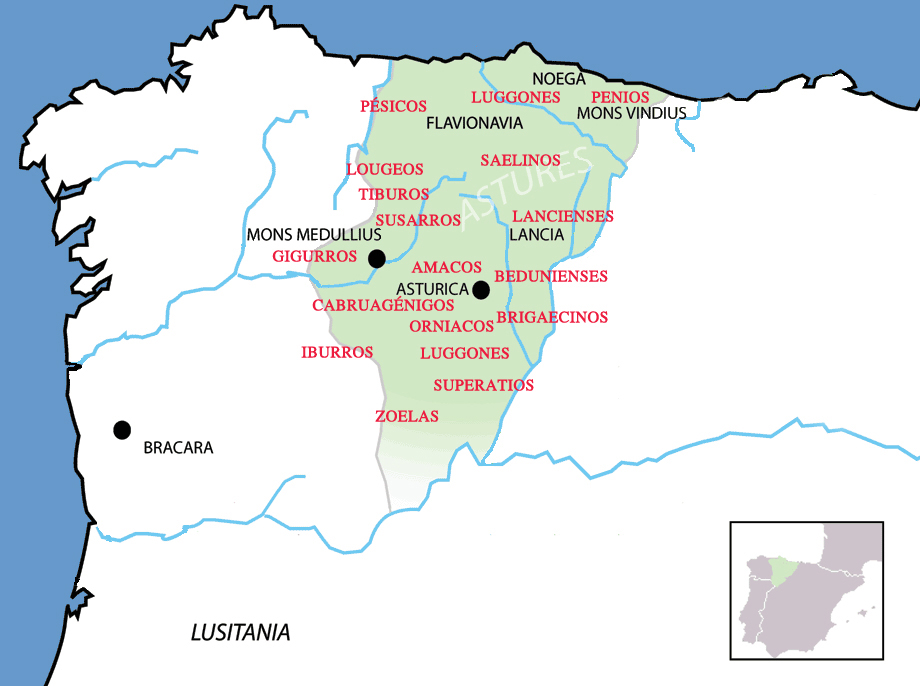
Map of the Astures region of northern Spain

In 2002, he proposed that the Astures people of northern Spain are not of Indo-European origin, citing evidence from Ancient Greek sources, the phonology of Asturian, and the practice of covada, a tradition where the father stimulates childbirth.

== Works ==
Works on the Paleolithic Continuity Paradigm

- Las Primeras Palabras de la Humanidad, Valencia 2002.
- Sobre el origen anindoeuropeo de los ástures y maragatos. Palaeohispanica, 2002.
- Zoónimos ancestrales, Valencia 2007.
- Linguística Indo-Europeia Tradicional e Paradigma da Continuidade Paleolítica cara a cara, Lisboa 2009.
- Origen de la lengua valenciana.

Other books

- A Catulo usque ad Catullum. Studia neoterica, Barcelona 1988.
- Fonemática del latín clásico. Consonantismo, Zaragoza 1996.
- Los Mejores Títulos y los Peores Versos de la Literatura Latina, Barcelona 1998.
- Gálatas, Getas y Atlantes. Tres Ensayos de GeoFilología Clásica, Valencia 2010.
