= Maria Rita Rossa =

Italian politician and mayor

President of the Province of Alessandria
- In office 13 October 2014 – 27 June 2017
- Preceded by: Paolo Filippi
- Succeeded by: Gianfranco Baldi

Mayor of Alessandria
- In office 21 May 2012 – 27 June 2017
- Preceded by: Piercarlo Fabbio
- Succeeded by: Gianfranco Cuttica di Revigliasco

Personal details
- Born: 19 April 1966 (age 60) Alessandria, Italy
- Party: Democratic Party
- Occupation: Politician
- Website: ritarossasindaco.it

Maria Rita Rossa (born 19 April 1966) is an Italian politician of the Democratic Party. Born in Alessandria, Italy. she is the daughter of Angelo Rossa, a member of the Italian Socialist Party and president of the Province of Alessandria and the Piedmont Regional Council in the 1980s.

Rossa was mayor of Alessandria from 21 May 2012 to 26 June 2017 and president of the province from 14 October 2014 to 26 June 2017. Maria is married and has children.

Political offices
Preceded by Piercarlo Fabbio	Mayor of Alessandria; 2012–2017	Succeeded by Gianfranco Cuttica di Revigliasco
Preceded by Paolo Filippi	President of the Province of Alessandria; 2014–2017	Succeeded by Gianfranco Baldi
