= Ballesteros de Calatrava =

- Municipality
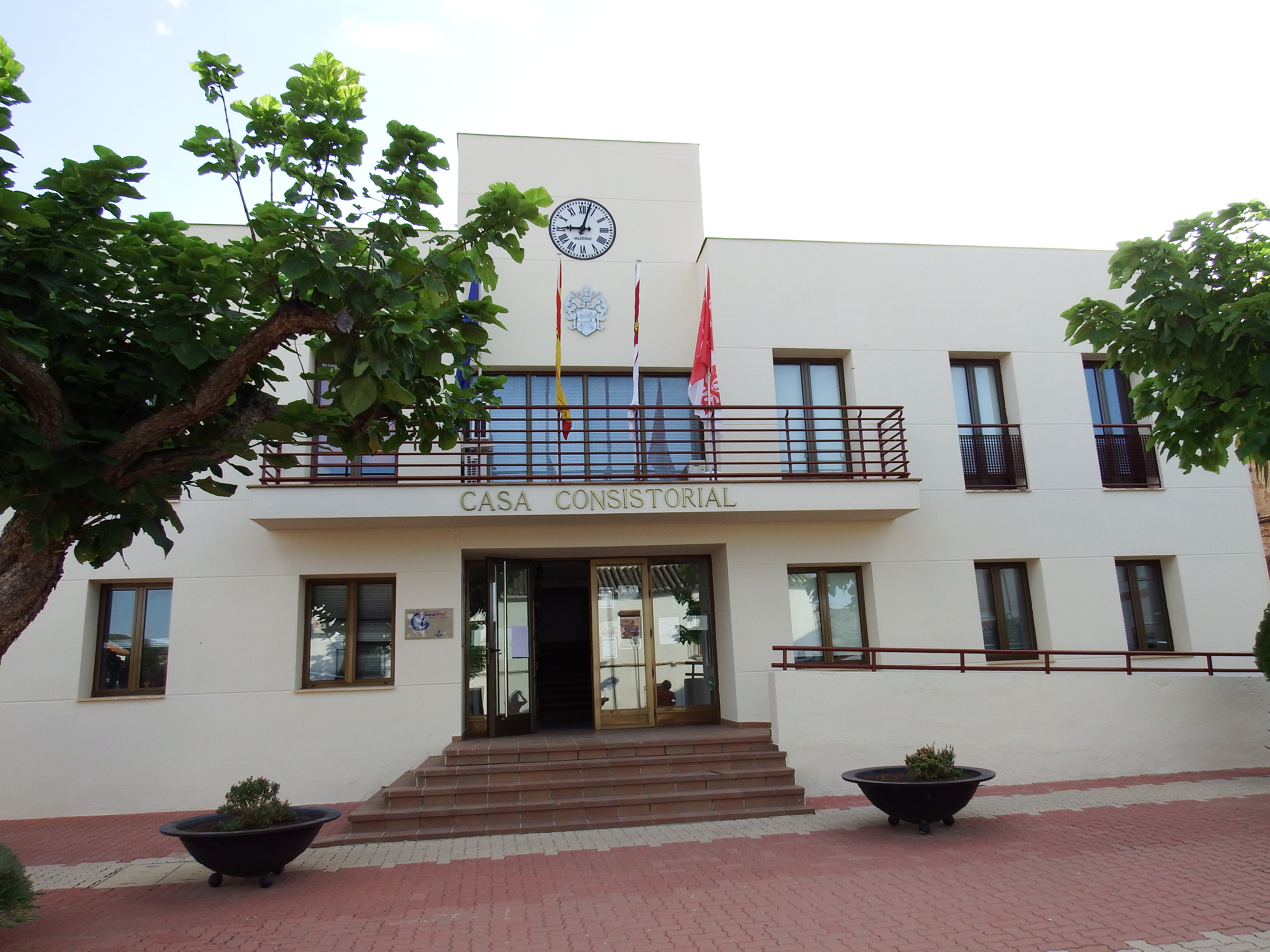
- Ballesteros de Calatrava Town Hall

- Flag Coat of arms

- Location of Ballesteros de Calatrava in Spain. Ballesteros de Calatrava (Castilla-La Mancha)
- Coordinates: 38.8344°N 3.94556°W
- Country: Spain
- Autonomous Community: Castile-La Mancha
- Province: Ciudad Real
- Comarca: Campo de Calatrava

Government
  - Mayor: Juan Carlos Moraleda Herrera (PSOE)

Area
  - Total: 57.87 km^{2} (22.34 sq mi)

Population (2024)
  - Total: 371
  - Density: 6.41/km^{2} (16.6/sq mi)
- Demonym: Ballesterano/a
- Time zone: UTC+1 (CET)
  - Summer (DST): UTC+2 (CEST)
- Postal code: 13432

Ballesteros de Calatrava is a municipality in Ciudad Real, Castile-La Mancha, Spain. It has a population of 371.
