= Alda Balestra =

Italian model and producer

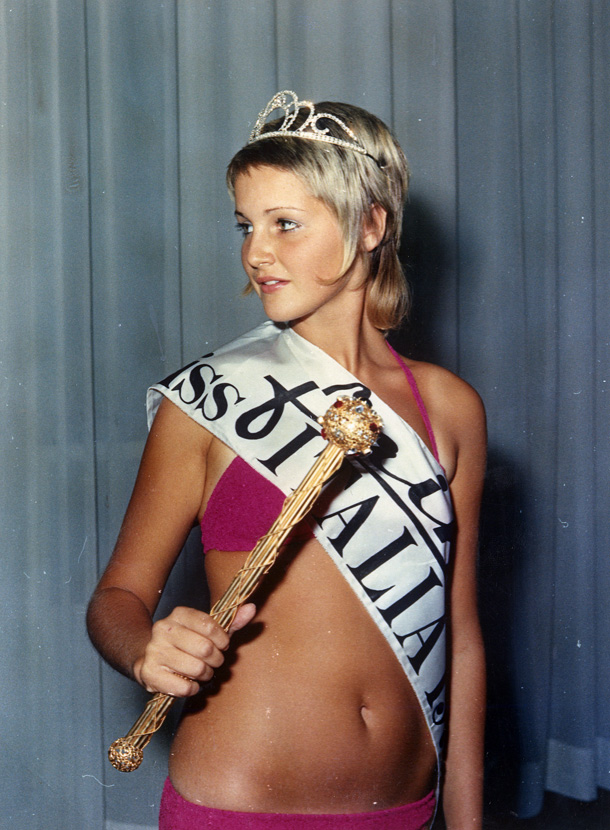
- Alda Balestra as Miss Italy in 1970
- Born: August 14, 1954 (age 72); Trieste, Italy
- Occupations: model; producer
- Years active: 1975–1992
- Spouse: Frantz von Stauffenberg (m. 1990)
- Children: 2

Alda Balestra (born August 14, 1954) is a former Italian model who was chosen as Miss Italy in 1970.

== Biography ==
Alda Balestra was born on August 14, 1954, in Trieste, when it was under the Allied Military Government that had been formed to govern Trieste after the Second World War. At the age of sixteen, she was chosen as Miss Italy in Salsomaggiore Terme. She later became a model, eventually becoming the highest paid model in Italy.

Balestra graduated from college, but her career as an international model would take precedence, lasting for seventeen years beginning in 1975. She worked in Milan, Paris and New York, having appeared in fashion shows for Gianni Versace and done fashion magazine editorials. She also appeared in cosmetics ads for L'Oréal and Christian Dior, an ad for the latter showing her in profile becoming iconic. "Every now and then I participated in some local events as a model, I remember the fashion shows for Beltrame and the other tailors that were very elegant at the time," she recalled in 2014. "After the final exams and an awarded trip to the U.S. to learn English, I enrolled in literature and philosophy, but fate had a turning point in store for me."

The turning point was the chance to meet a group of young fashion designers in Florence, one of whom was Versace. Balestra recalled that Versace "immediately chose me for his catwalk at Palazzo Pitti," while "Giorgia Fashion proposed me for six pages of advertising on Vogue and so this is how my long adventure began as a model and a fashion model."

in 1990, toward the end of her modeling career, Balestra married Frantz von Stauffenberg, of a prominent German family. After living in New York, she and her family moved to Berlin in 2000. There, Balestra began her post-modeling career in communications and in art and design. She has also collaborated on numerous fashion films.
