= Manuel Ballester =

Spanish chemist (1919–2005)

Manuel Ballester Boix (born in Barcelona on 27 June 1919; died 5 April 2005) was a Spanish chemist.

== Biography ==
He received his degree at the University of Barcelona in 1944, his doctorate in Madrid, and was a research fellow at Harvard University in 1951. In 1944 he formed a team at the Spanish National Research Council. His work has largely been in kinetics and organic chemistry.

== Awards ==
- 1982 - Prince of Asturias Award for Technical and Scientific Research
