= Francisque =

Francisque may refer to:

- Order of the Francisque, a French order and medal
- Francisque (actor), 18th-century French actor
- Francisque or Francisca, a throwing axe
