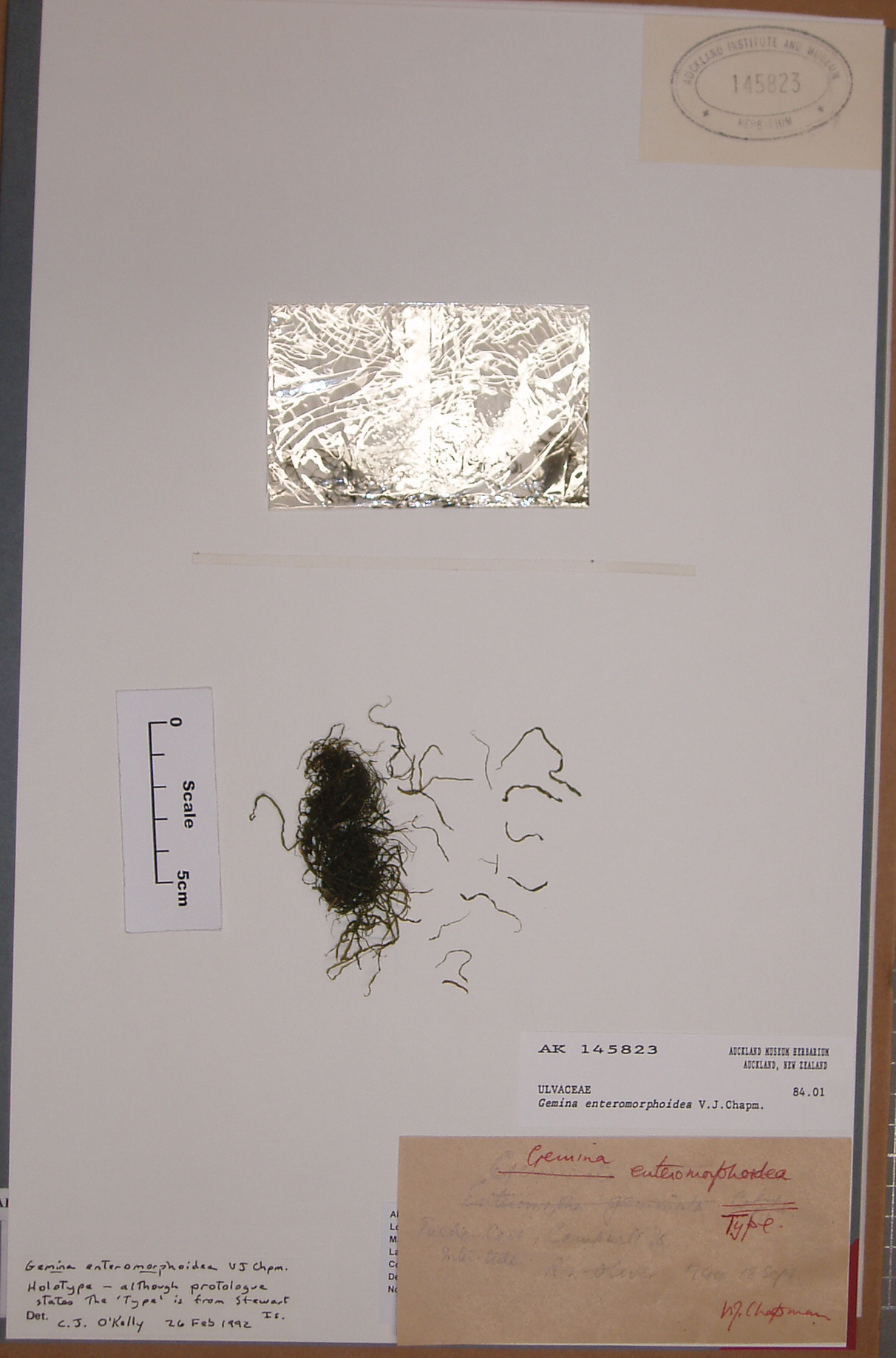
- Gemina enteromophoidea

Scientific classification
- Clade: Viridiplantae
- Division: Chlorophyta
- Class: Ulvophyceae
- Order: Ulvales
- Family: Ulvaceae
- Genus: Gemina; V.J. Chapman, 1952

= Gemina =

Genus of algae

Gemina is a genus of green alga.

== Species ==
Some species include:

- Gemina clavata
- Gemina enteromorphoidea
- Gemina letterstedtoidea
- Gemina ulvoidea
