= Francesa Sarah of Safed =

16th century Jewish mystic

Francesa Sarah
- פרנסיזה שרה
- Born: 16th century
- Known for: Jewish mysticism, early Sabbateanism, having a magid
- Notable work: Prophesies recorded in the Sefer ha-Ḥezyonot

Francesa Sarah (Hebrew: פרנסיזה שרה; 16th-century) was a Jewish mystic. She is described in the Sefer ha-Ḥezyonot ("The Book of Visions") by Hayyim Vital. She was a holy woman in Safed, and unique in Jewish religious history as the only woman regarded to have had a magid, an angelic spirit with the ability to foretell the future. A magid was, in accordance with belief, granted only to very select few among the highest scholars, and she was the only woman credited such. She is depicted as extremely wise and righteous, and made several famed prophesies. Little biographical fact is known about her life.

Allegedly, she made a prophecy to the daughter of Rabbi Solomon Alkabetz that the Messiah would come in Vital's lifetime. The Toledot Ha'ari, a text written around the end of the 16th century, records two stories about Francesa. The first story concerns a rabbi who responds to her prophecy of a plague by declaring a day for fasting and prayer. She foretells his death. The second story concerns a different rabbi who plans to settle in Ankara with his business partner. Francesa informs the rabbi that his business partner is already dead and therefore there is no point in settling in Ankara. The rabbi instead decides to travel to Ankara to collect his investment and return to Eretz Yisrael; Francesa informs him that he will surely find success this time, as God wants the rabbi to not leave the Land of Israel. J. H. Chajes writes that the Francesa described in the Toledot Ha'ari evokes imagery of the Witch of Endor.

== See also ==
- Rachel Aberlin
