= Francesca Petitjean =

French professional female bodybuilder (born 1962)

- Professional bodybuilder

Personal info
- Born: 30 November 1962 (age 63); Cannes, France

Best statistics
- Height: 1.70 m (5 ft 7 in)

Professional (Pro) career
- Pro-debut: Jan Tana Classic; 1993
- Best win: Ms. International, 13th; 1996
- Active: Retired in 1997

Francesca Petitjean (born 30 November 1962) is a French professional female bodybuilder who was active in the 1980s and 1990s. From 1998 to 2003, she was featured in a number of adult films.

== Bodybuilding career ==
Petitjean was the World Amateur Body Building Association World Champion (amateur, tall category) in 1989 and 1992 and the second (professional) after Gabriele Klug of Austria in 1990. By 1993 she became an International Federation of BodyBuilders Pro and retired from competitive bodybuilding after 1996.

=== International competition record ===
- 1989 WABBA European Championships - 3rd (Tall)
- 1989 WABBA World Championships - 1st (Tall)
- 1990 WABBA World Championships - 2nd (Professional)
- 1992 WABBA World Championships - 1st (Tall)
- 1993 IFBB Jan Tana Classic - 12th
- 1994 IFBB Canada Pro Cup - 8th
- 1994 IFBB Grand Prix Prague - 12th
- 1995 IFBB Grand Prix Prague - 8th
- 1995 IFBB Jan Tana Classic - Withdrew
- 1996 IFBB Grand Prix Prague - 6th
- 1996 IFBB Grand Prix Slovakia - 7th
- 1996 IFBB Ms. International - 13th
- 1996 IFBB Jan Tana Classic - 19th

== Pornographic film career ==
Petitjean made her first pornographic appearance by 1998 in Acteurs porno en analyse by José Bénazéraf and attained international fame in Body Builders in Heat series released by Channel 69 studios. She starred in the 4th of the series that was directed by Julien Lacourt and released in March 2000, she went on to appear in four more releases in the series (directed by Fabien Lafait).
