= Francesca Calvo =

Italian politician (1949–2003)

Mayor of Alessandria
- In office 7 December, 1993 – 11 June, 2002
- Preceded by: Gian Luca Veronesi
- Succeeded by: Mara Scagni

Personal details
- Born: May 17, 1949 Turin, Italy
- Died: April 30, 2003 (aged 53) Pavia, Italy
- Party: LN (1989–1999; 2001–2003)
- Other political affiliations: PLI (until 1989)
- Spouse: Marquis Luciano Buzzi Langhi
- Children: 2
- Alma mater: University of Turin
- Profession: Politician

Francesca Calvo (May 17, 1949 – April 30, 2003) was an Italian politician and the mayor of Alessandria from 1993 to 2002.

== Life and career ==
Francesca Calvo was born on May 17, 1949 in Turin, Italy. She is the only daughter of Giorgio Calvo, a bank manager, and his wife, Piera Calvo (née Gagliardi). Her family originated from Turin, then moved to Alessandria. She attended Liceo scientifico Galileo Galilei and later enrolled in the Faculty of Law at University of Turin.

Calvo began her political career in the 1980s, she first joined Italian Liberal Party. In 1993, she was the candidate for the office of mayor of Alessandria, winning the ballot against the candidate of the Democratic Party of the Left, Andrea Ferrari. During her first year of being the mayor, she found herself having to manage the situation caused by Tanaro flood in 1994 and the consequent reconstruction. In 1997, she was re-elected as the mayor, at the head of a coalition containing the Northern League, Padan Workers and Free Alessandria, obtaining 58.1% of the votes against Mario Ivaldi.

In 1999, she was expelled from the Northern League after having defended Domenico Comino. she joined Piemont, movement founded by Comino, the person she defended, which federated with the Autonomists for Europe. She was the candidate for the presidency of the Piedmont region in 2000, obtaining only 2.58% of the votes.

In the following years, she moved closer to the League, obtaining a position from Roberto Castelli, minister of justice in the Second Berlusconi government, and heading a list with her own name in support of Oreste Rossi, candidate of the House of Freedoms for mayor of Alessandria in 2002.

== Personal life ==
Calvo was married to Marquis Luciano Buzzi Langhi. They had 2 children together, Davide and Mario.

== Death ==
Calvo passed away on April 30, 2003 by a serious illness at Pavia Hospital at the age of 53. For her legacy, the civic library of the city of Alessandria is named after her.

Political offices
Preceded by Gina Luca Veronesi	Mayor of Alessandria; 1993–2002	Succeeded by Mara Scagni
