= Francesco Giacobbe =

Italian politician (born 1958)

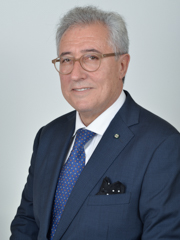
- 2018
- Born: 10 July 1958 (age 67); Catania, Italy
- Occupation: Politician
- Political party: Democratic Party

Francesco Giacobbe (born 10 July 1958) is an Italian-Australian politician from the Democratic Party. As of 2014 he served as member of the Senate of Italy.
