= Lorenzo Campins y Ballester =

Spanish-born physician (1726–1785)

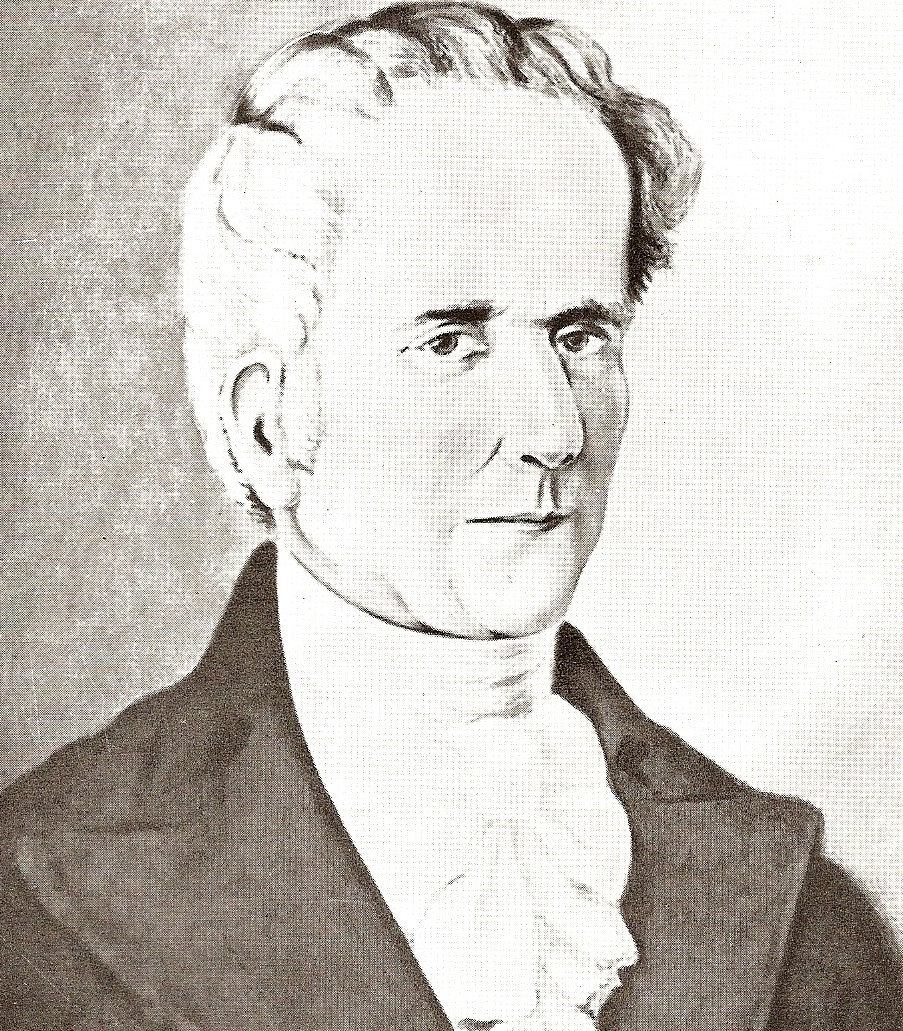
Lorenzo Campins y Ballester

Lorenzo Campins y Ballester (1726 in Palma de Mallorca – February 20, 1785 in Caracas) was a Spanish-born physician, considered to be the founder of the formal studies of modern medicine in Venezuela. He studied medicine at the Real y Pontificia Universidad de Gandía (1755). He served as a physician until 1761 when he travelled to Caracas to serve as a faculty member in the Real y Pontificia Universidad de Caracas.
