= Joachim Aberlin =

German religious songwriter

Joachim Aberlin (d. after 1554) was a German pastor, teacher and songwriter and is author of a large number of songs for the Reformed Church.

He wrote the hymnal Der gantz Psalter (The whole Psaltery) in 1537, and 68 songs for the psalter of Sigmund Salminger in 1538. According to an acrostic in one of his larger poems (Bibel oder heilige Geschrift: Gesangsweis in drei Liedern aufs kürzeste zusammenverfasset. Zürich bey Froschouer). he was born in the village of Garmenschwiler between the Danube and the Bodensee.

== Sources ==
- Paul Pressel (1875). "Aberlin, Joachim" . Allgemeine Deutsche Biographie (in German). Vol. 1. Leipzig: Duncker & Humblot. p. 20.
