= Hugo Ballesteros =

Chilean politician and diplomat (1931–2019)

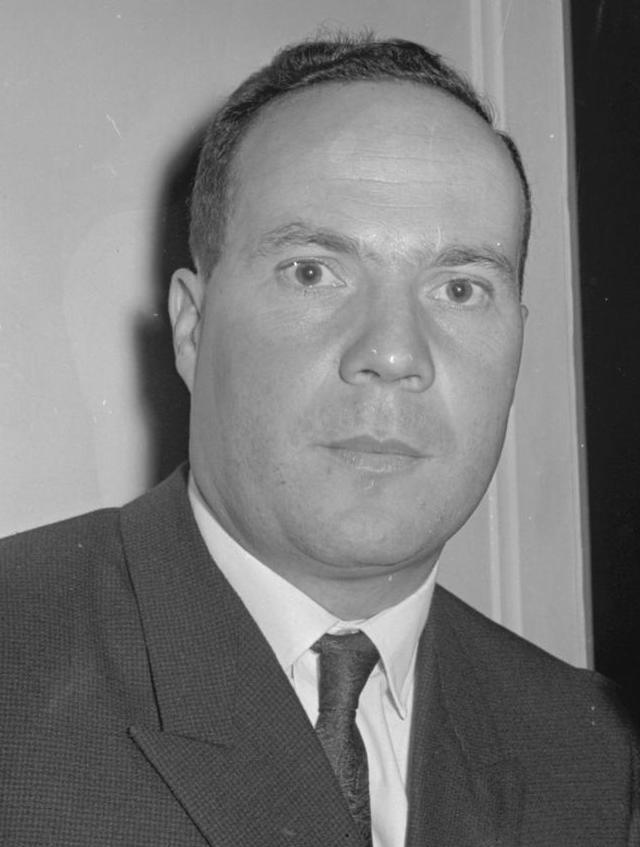
- Ballesteros in 1965

Member of the Senate
- In office 15 May 1969 – 21 September 1973
- Constituency: 3rd Provincial Grouping

President of the Chamber of Deputies
- In office 25 May 1965 – 17 October 1967
- Preceded by: Raúl Morales Adriasola
- Succeeded by: Alfredo Lorca

Member of the Chamber of Deputies
- In office 15 May 1957 – 15 May 1969
- Constituency: 6th Departmental Grouping

Personal details
- Born: Hugo Eugenio Ballesteros Reyes; 3 January 1931 Santiago, Chile
- Died: 7 April 2019 (aged 88) Santiago, Chile
- Party: Christian Democratic Party
- Parent(s): Luis Ballesteros; Teresa Reyes
- Education: University of Chile
- Profession: Lawyer

Hugo Eugenio Ballesteros Reyes (3 January 1931 – 7 April 2019) was a Chilean politician and diplomat.

Born in Santiago, he studied law at the Universidad de Chile's campus in Valparaíso. He served as a member of the Chamber of Deputies (1957–1969) and the Senate (1969–1973). In 1964 he was also a member of his country's delegation to the United Nations General Assembly.

Ballesteros Reyes died of brain cancer in Valparaíso, at the age of 88.
