= Jesús Ballesteros =

Spanish philosopher (born 1943)

Jesús Ballesteros (born 1943 in Valencia) is a Spanish philosopher and jurist.

== Education ==
In 1965, he earned his law degree with highest qualifications. In 1971, he obtained a doctoral degree from the University of Valencia after defending a thesis about Giuseppe Capograssi.

== Career ==
Since 1983 he has been teaching Philosophy of Law and Political Philosophy at the University of Valencia School of Law.

During this time, he combined academic activities with research. He mentored 21 doctoral theses along with 39 dissertations. His presence was requested on many national and international seminars which have taken place in Germany, Colombia, Spain, Italy, and Mexico.

He is currently a member of the Spanish Society of Judicial and Political Philosophy, the Spanish Society of Bioethics, and a member of the Assessment Council on the journals Anuario de Derechos Humanos, Persona y Derecho, Cuadernos de Bioética, Ragion Pratica, Rivista di Filosofia del Diritto y Teoria del diritto e dello Stato. He has also been a member of the Real Academy on Valencian Culture.

== Thought ==
His work is designed to trigger new thoughts about current issues. His work manifests concerns about the recent challenges humans are facing and how to solve them.

In the 1990s he investigated political ecology. During the decade he considered bioethics in terms of the new possibilities of biotechnology. In the first decade of the 21st century, he extended his interest in human rights and the defense of human dignity, writing about war and intercultural dialogue. He has studied a wide field of legal, philosophical, and political issues: human rights, violence, political ecology biotechnology, feminism, and postmodernity.

== Personal life ==
He is the father of seven children.

== Works ==
=== Books (English) ===
- Globalization and human rights: challenges and answers from a European perspective, (Editors: Ballesteros, Encarnación Fernández and Pedro Talavera), Dordrecht, Springer, 2012.
- Jesús Ballesteros at Google Books Postmodernity and Decadence, Pamplona, Universidad de Navarra, 1992.

=== Major books (Spanish) ===
- Biotecnología y Posthumanismo (Editors: Ballesteros and Encarnación Fernández), Aranzadi, 2007.
- Repensar la paz, Pamplona, Eiunsa, 2006.
- La humanidad in vitro, Granada, Comares, 2004.
- Biotecnología, dignidad y derecho: bases para un diálogo, (Editors: Ángela Aparisi and Ballesteros), Pamplona, EUNSA, 2004.
- Ecologismo personalista. Cuidar la naturaleza, cuidar al hombre, Madrid, Tecnos, 1995.
- Sociedad y medioambiente (editor), Madrid, Trotta, 1997.
- Derechos Humanos, Madrid, Tecnos, 1992.
- Sobre el sentido del derecho, Madrid, Tecnos, 1984, (3rd edition 2001).
- La filosofía jurídica de Giuseppe Capograssi, Madrid-Roma. Instituto Jurídico Español de Roma, C.S.I.C., 1973.
