= Francesca Moraci =

Italian architect and academic

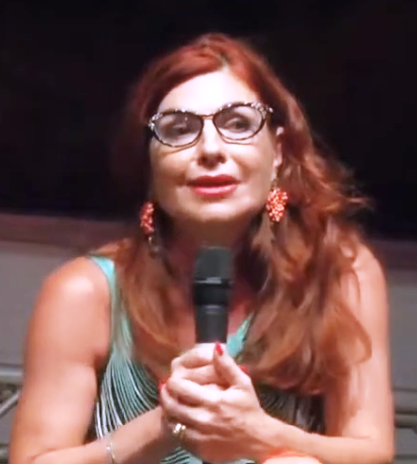
- Moraci in 2015
- Born: June 8, 1955 (age 71); Messina, Italy
- Citizenship: Italian
- Education: University of Reggio Calabria
- Occupations: Architect, academic
- Projects: Urban planning and sustainable mobility projects

Francesca Moraci (born 8 June 1955) is an Italian architect and academic, known for her work in urban planning, sustainable mobility, and territorial development policies.

== Biographical notes and academic career ==
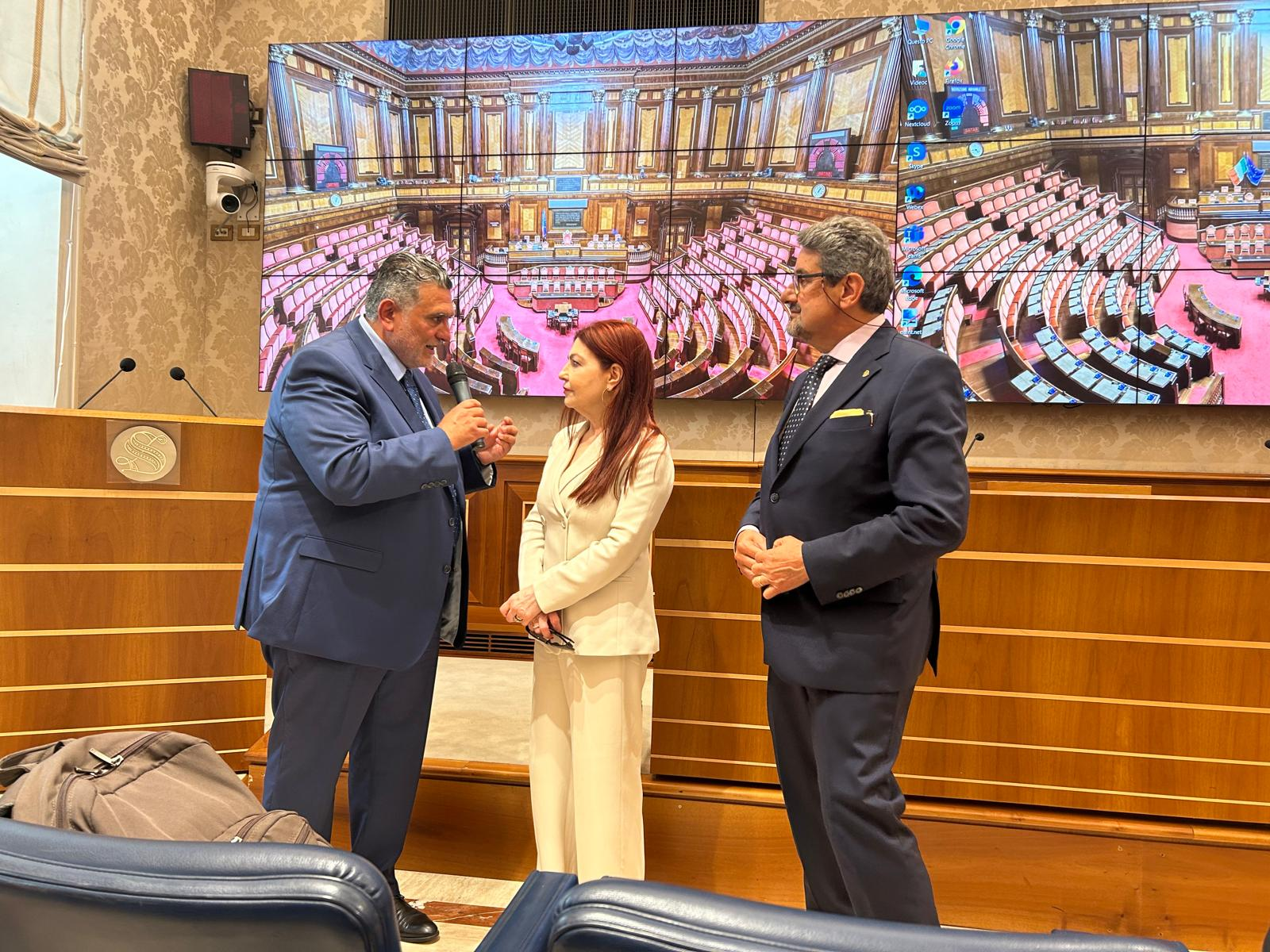
Moraci interview at Palazzo Madama in 2023, at her left Claudio Borri.

Moraci was born in Messina, Italy. She graduated in architecture and later pursued an academic career focused on urban planning and sustainable territorial development. She is full professor of urban planning at the Mediterranea University of Reggio Calabria, where she has held several academic and institutional roles, including departmental and governance positions.

Her research activity focuses on urban and regional planning, sustainable development, and infrastructure systems, with particular attention to the Mediterranean area.

She has also served in advisory and institutional roles, including positions within national infrastructure-related bodies.

== Activity on the Strait of Messina Bridge ==
Moraci has been involved for decades in studies concerning the Strait of Messina Bridge and the territorial and infrastructural system of the Strait area.

Her research includes contributions to territorial and environmental planning studies developed within the framework of activities coordinated by the American engineering firm Parsons Transportation Group, which was responsible for project management and technical verification of the bridge project.

These activities were part of the broader process leading to the development of the final design of the bridge, delivered in 2010 by the general contractor Eurolink.

She is considered one of the leading experts on the “Strait system”, addressing the integration between infrastructure, urban systems, and Mediterranean geopolitics.

== Notable projects ==
Her work includes contributions to:

- Urban regeneration and planning strategies in Southern Italy
- Sustainable mobility and transport systems
- Strategic planning for metropolitan and coastal areas
- Research initiatives on infrastructure and territorial integration

She has contributed to interdisciplinary projects linking architecture, infrastructure, and environmental sustainability.

== Publications ==
Moraci is the author of numerous scientific publications in the fields of urban planning and sustainable development. Her work has appeared in academic journals, conference proceedings, and collective volumes focusing on:

- Sustainable urban development
- Territorial governance
- Mobility and infrastructure systems
- Environmental planning

Moraci is the author of numerous scientific publications in the fields of urban planning and territorial development. Among her works:

- Il Ponte sullo Stretto e le opere connesse: il metaprogetto territoriale e paesaggistico (2012)

== Conferences and academic initiatives ==
Moraci has collaborated with academic institutions, research centers, and policy-making bodies on issues related to sustainable territorial development.

Her work includes:

- Strategic territorial planning for the Strait of Messina area
- Sustainable mobility and infrastructure integration
- Urban regeneration policies in Southern Italy

Moraci has participated in numerous conferences and institutional initiatives concerning infrastructure and territorial development.

In November 2024 she was invited to the Bridge Commission of Messina to present a report on the geopolitical and territorial role of the Strait of Messina.
