= Francesca Alderisi =

Italian politician and television presenter

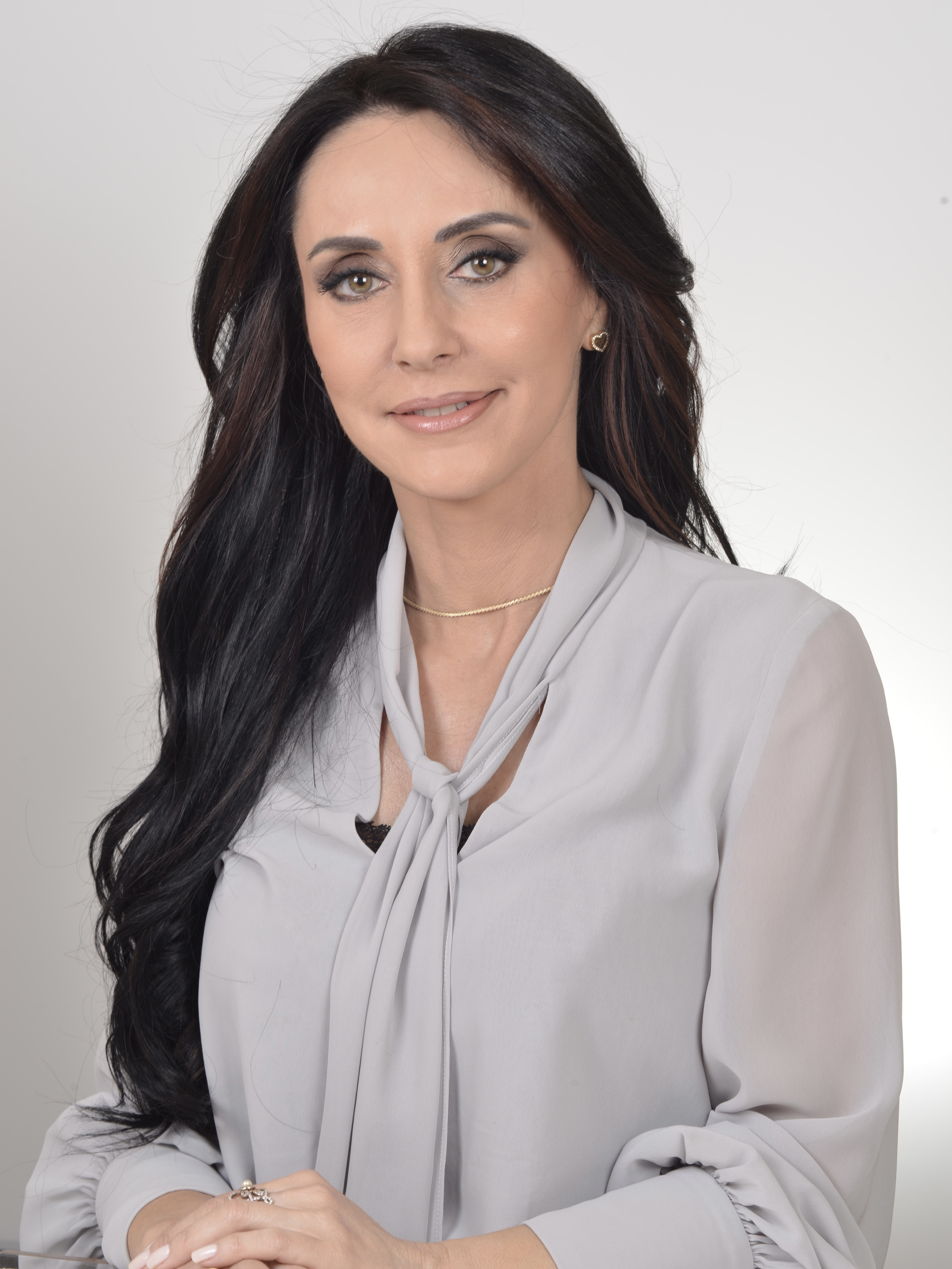
- Alderisi in 2018

Senate of the Republic (Italy)
- In office March 23, 2018 – October 12, 2022

Personal details
- Born: Francesca Alderisi; 29 March 1968 (age 58) Treviso, Italy
- Party: Forza Italia
- Occupation: Politician; Television presenter
- Website: Senate website

Francesca Alderisi (born 29 March 1968) is an Italian politician and television presenter. Since 2018, she has been a Senator from Forza Italia representing North and Central America.

== Biography ==
Since 2000, she has presented and written eight editions of Sportello Italia, a service television program broadcast worldwide by Rai International where, in 2015, she presented the program Cara Francesca.

=== Election to Senator ===
In the 2018 general elections she was elected to the Senate of the Republic, in the foreign constituency (North America and Central America) as a member of Forza Italia in the center-right unitary list "Salvini-Berlusconi-Meloni", by virtue of 10,994 personal preferences.

On October 4, 2019, she donated to the Historical Archive of the Senate "his collection of writings in the form of memoirs, diaries and stories (...) received from Italians abroad on all continents in twenty years of activity in this field".

In December 2019 she was among the 64 signatories (of which 41 from Forza Italia) of the confirmation referendum on the reduction of parliamentarians: a few months earlier, Berlusconi's senators had left the room during the vote on the constitutional reform.
