= Adriano Cario =

Italian politician

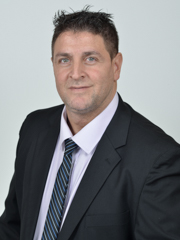
Adriano Cario in 2018

Adriano Cario is an Italian senator, a former entrepreneur and journalist.

== Biography ==
Born in Montevideo, Uruguay, he moved to Buenos Aires, Argentina.

He was the director of L'Eco d'Italia and president of the Centro Calabrese association in Buenos Aires.

=== Election to the Senate ===
In the 2018 general elections, he was elected to the Senate of the Republic in the “OVERSEAS B” (South America) on the list of the South American Union of Italian Emigrants (USEI), with 21,800 personal votes.

On May 3, 2018, he left the USEI and joined the Associative Movement of Italians Abroad (MAIE), supporting the First Conte government.

In December 2019, he was among the 64 signatories for the referendum on cutting the number of parliamentarians.

After being part of various components of the Mixed Group, on January 27, 2021, Cario participated in the formation of the Europeists-Maie-Centro Democratico group in the Senate, a group of 10 parliamentarians from the Mixed Group of different backgrounds (MAIE, CD, Autonomies, ex-M5S, ex-PD, ex-FI) which dissolved on March 29 of the same year.

In October 2021, the Senate's Elections and Immunities Committee unanimously approved the proposal to contest the senator's election due to alleged electoral fraud in ballots and votes. The Public Prosecutor's Office of Rome ordered an expert examination of the ballots. The handwriting expert specified that "after examining 125 ballots from one section and 100 from another, there were no different hands for each ballot, but rather the presence of groups of ballots attributable to the same hand".

On December 2, 2021, the Senate voted, in a secret ballot, on a motion asking for the invalidation of Cario's election due to falsified votes; the vote concluded with 132 in favor, 126 against, and 6 abstentions, resulting in Adriano Cario's expulsion from the Senate.
