= Balestrero =

Balestrero is a surname. Notable people with the surname include:

- Christopher Emmanuel Balestrero (1909–1998), the person on whom the movie The Wrong Man (1956) is based
- Ettore Balestrero (born 1966), diplomat of the Holy See
- Gregory Balestrero (born 1947), American industrial engineer
- Renato Balestrero (1898–1948), Italian racing car driver
