= Arturo Ballester Marco =

Spanish artist (1892–1981)

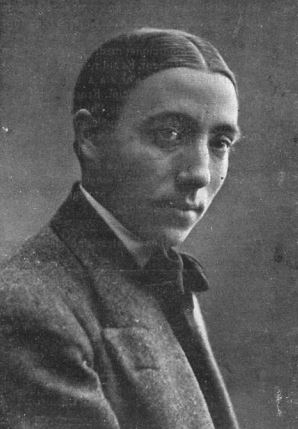
Arturo Ballester Marco

Arturo Ballester Marco (1892–1981) was an artist and illustrator known for his Spanish Civil War posters.

Born in Valencia, Spain, Marco studied art at the School of Arts and Trades in the School of San Carlos in Valencia.

Marco's Spanish Civil War posters are among the most noted images from that conflict. Most of the work was for the CNT-FAI. his brother Vincente also designed posters during the civil war.

== See also ==
- Castillo, Montserrat (1997) Grans il·lustradors catalans del llibre per a infants, 1905-1939 Biblioteca de Catalunya
- García García, Manuel . Noticia del cartelista valenciano Artur Ballester Marco . Turia, 1977, n. 692, 25 abr.-1 mayo.
- García García, Manuel . Arturo Ballester . Lápiz, 1986, n. 32, marzo, p. 62.
- Valencia capital de la República (1936–1986) . Lápiz, 1986, n. 33, abr., p. 76.
- García García, Manuel . Arturo Ballester, revisitado . Turia, 1986, n. 1159, 21-27 abr.
- García Cortés, José Miguel . Arturo Ballester: un artista multifacético . Papers d'educació i cultura, 1986, n. 16, mayo, p. 29.
- Martin, Rupert and Morris, Frances (1986) No Pasarán! Photographs and Posters of the Spanish Civil War. Bristol.
- Murió en Valencia Arturo Ballester, uno de los grandes diseñadores gráficos españoles Tenía 89 años, falleció en la pobreza y 15 personas fueron a su entierro JAIME MILLAS, - Valencia - 23 June 1981
- Art i propaganda: cartells de la Universitat de València By Universitat de València
