= Pietro Balestra (sculptor) =

Italian sculptor

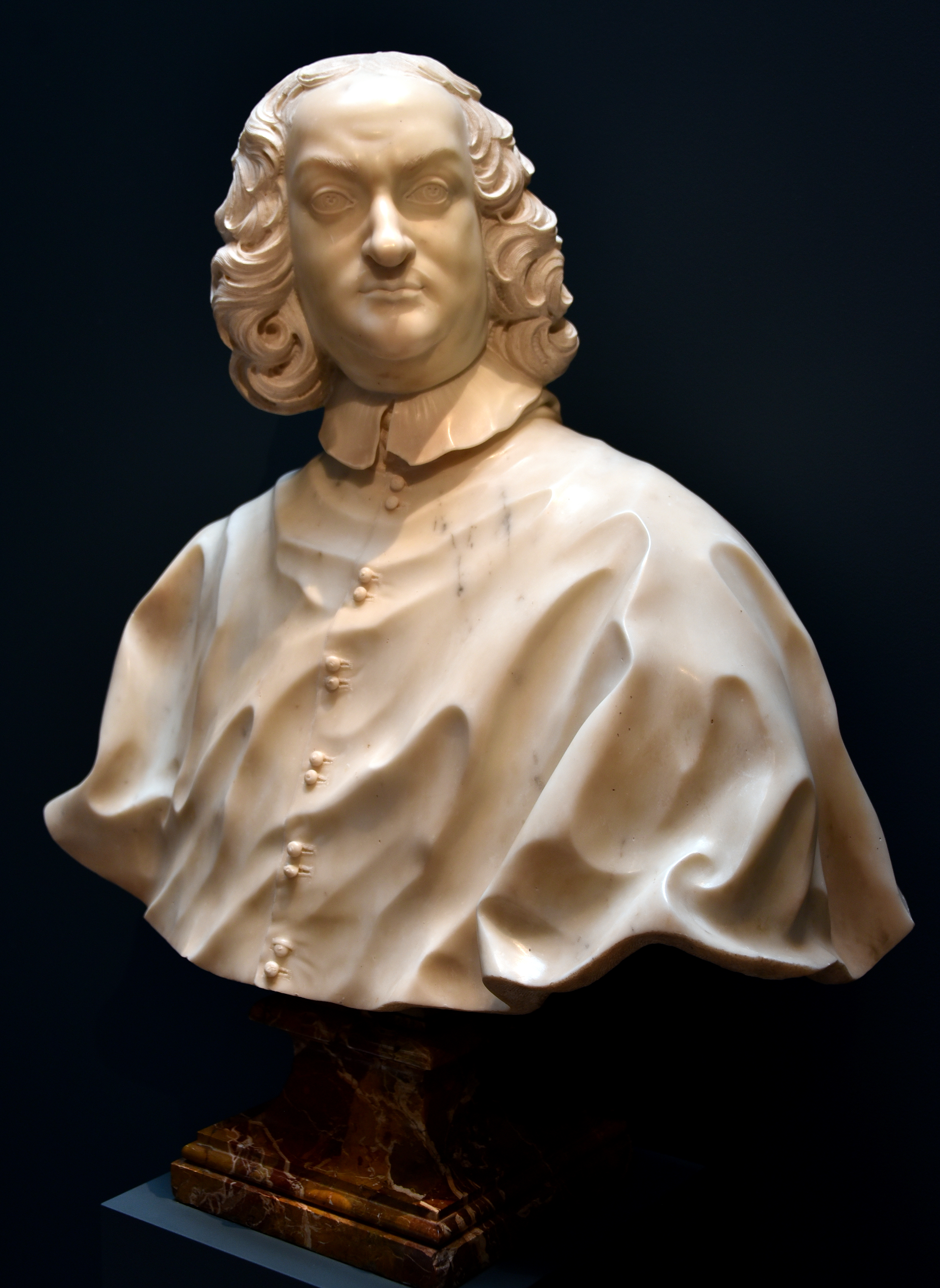
Cardinal Decio Azzolino, 1667, by Pietro Balestra. Nationalmuseum, Stockholm, Sweden

Pietro Balestra (c. 1672 – after 1729) was an Italian sculptor of the late-Baroque period. He was born in Siena, and was best known for his work in marble in Dresden, including a Meleager slaying the Calydonian Boar; Venus and Cupid, and Boreas and the Rape of Orithyia.
