= List of storms named Francesca =

The name Francesca has been used for three tropical cyclones in the Eastern Pacific Ocean.

- Hurricane Francesca (1966)
- Hurricane Francesca (1970)
- Hurricane Francesca (1974)

The name Francesca has also been used for one tropical cyclone in the Southwest Indian Ocean.

- Cyclone Francesca (2002)
