= Francisca Ballesteros =

Spanish woman

- Born: 1969 (age 56–57); Valencia, Spain
- Other names: The Melilla Poisoner; The Poisoner of Melilla; Paqui Ballesteros
- Status: Incarcerated
- Convictions: Murder, Attempted murder
- Criminal charges: Murder

Francisca Ballesteros (born 1969) is a Spanish woman who poisoned to death her first baby, a five-month-old daughter, in 1990. Fourteen years later, in 2004, she killed her husband and second daughter because she had met a man on the Internet and wanted to run away from her parenting and marriage to be with her newfound lover. Ballesteros then tried to poison her twelve-year-old son, although he survived after eight months of recovery. Following her son's poisoning, she was arrested by Spanish authorities. She was convicted on three counts of murder and one count of attempted murder and sentenced to eighty-four years in prison in 2005.

== Biography ==
Francisca Ballesteros was born in 1969 in Valencia. A few years later, she moved to Melilla.

After marrying Antonio González Barribino, Ballesteros gave birth to a daughter, who she named Florinda. In 1990, Ballesteros suffered from postpartum depression and wanted to end her marriage, but she finally decided against it. She instead decided to kill her family and flee to Valencia. Ballesteros poisoned Florinda, who was only five months old, with Colme, a drug used to treat alcoholism. After the death of the baby, Ballesteros decided to wait to kill the rest of her family.

In 2004, 14 years after murdering her daughter, Ballesteros, who had met many men through the Internet, decided to kill the rest of her family, flee to the city where one of the men that she had met online was living, and marry him.

On 12 January 2004 Ballesteros killed her husband Antonio González Barribino with Colme and with the sedatives Zolpidem and Bromazepam. On 4 June 2004, Ballesteros killed her daughter Sandra with the same medications and attempted to kill her 12-year-old son Antonio, who was admitted to the hospital with poisoning on 4 June 2004. The autopsy of her daughter Sandra revealed that she had been poisoned.

On 7 June 2004, Ballesteros was arrested and confessed to the murders.

On 26 September 2005, Francisca Ballesteros was sentenced to a term of 84 years in prison.

== See also ==
- List of serial killers by country
