= First Conte government =

65th government of the Italian Republic

- 65th Cabinet of Italy

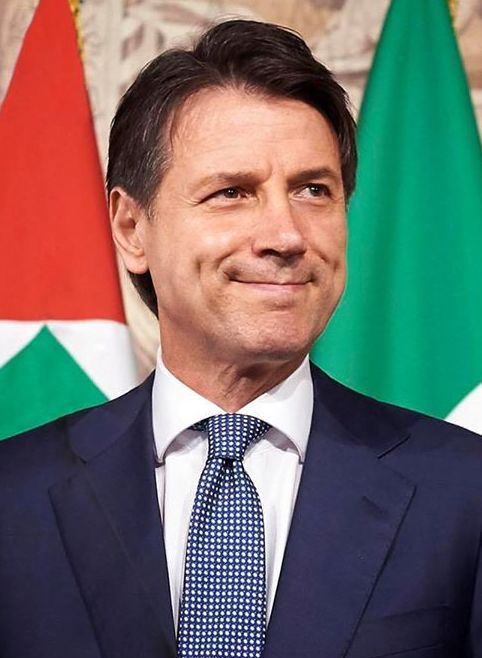
- Date formed: 1 June 2018
- Date dissolved: 5 September 2019 (462 days)

People and organisations
- Head of state: Sergio Mattarella
- Head of government: Giuseppe Conte
- Deputy head of government: Luigi Di Maio; Matteo Salvini
- No. of ministers: 19 (including the Prime Minister)
- Ministers removed: 1 resigned
- Total no. of members: 20 (including the Prime Minister)
- Member parties: M5S, Lega
- Status in legislature: Coalition (Majority)
- Opposition parties: PD, FI, FdI, LeU

History
- Incoming formation: 2018 government formation
- Election: 2018 election
- Legislature term: XVIII Legislature (2018–2022)
- Predecessor: Gentiloni government
- Successor: Second Conte government

The first Conte government was the 65th government of the Italian Republic. It was led by Giuseppe Conte, an independent politician, and it was in office from 1 June 2018 to 5 September 2019. The government was described as populist and the first of that kind in Europe; its policies, more specifically those of the League (Lega), were described by Italian media as souverainist.

The cabinet (known in Italy as the Council of Ministers) was formed by a coalition between the anti-establishment and populist Five Star Movement (M5S) and the right-wing populist Lega but also contained some independents proposed by each party (including the Prime Minister of Italy). It was referred to as the "government of change" (Italian: governo del cambiamento) after the title of the political agreement signed by the two parties, or the "yellow-green government" (governo gialloverde), based on their customary colours, even if Lega originally preferred "yellow-blue government" (governo gialloblu) due to its new campaign colour under Matteo Salvini's leadership.

== Supporting parties ==
Party	Main ideology	Leader
Five Star Movement (M5S)	Populism, direct democracy	Luigi Di Maio
League (Lega)	Right-wing populism, federalism	Matteo Salvini

At its birth, in addition to the M5S and Lega, the first Conte government was supported by the Associative Movement of Italians Abroad (MAIE), five deputies and two senators previously expelled from the M5S, one dissident senator from the South American Union Italian Emigrants (USEI), who later joined the MAIE, and one deputy of Forza Italia (FI), who sarcastically voted in favour of it. Ricardo Merlo, the leader of MAIE, was also named Undersecretary to the Ministry of Foreign Affairs on 12 June 2018. The government was also supported by the National Movement for Sovereignty (MNpS), the Sardinian Action Party (PSdA), and the Italian Liberal Party (PLI), whose senators sat in the Lega group. Brothers of Italy (FdI), the parties representing linguistic minorities, such as the Valdostan Union (UV), South Tyrolean People's Party (SVP), and Trentino Tyrolean Autonomist Party (PATT), and one deputy from USEI did not support the government but affirmed their willingness to vote for measures that reflect their respective ideologies.

== History ==
=== Background and formation ===
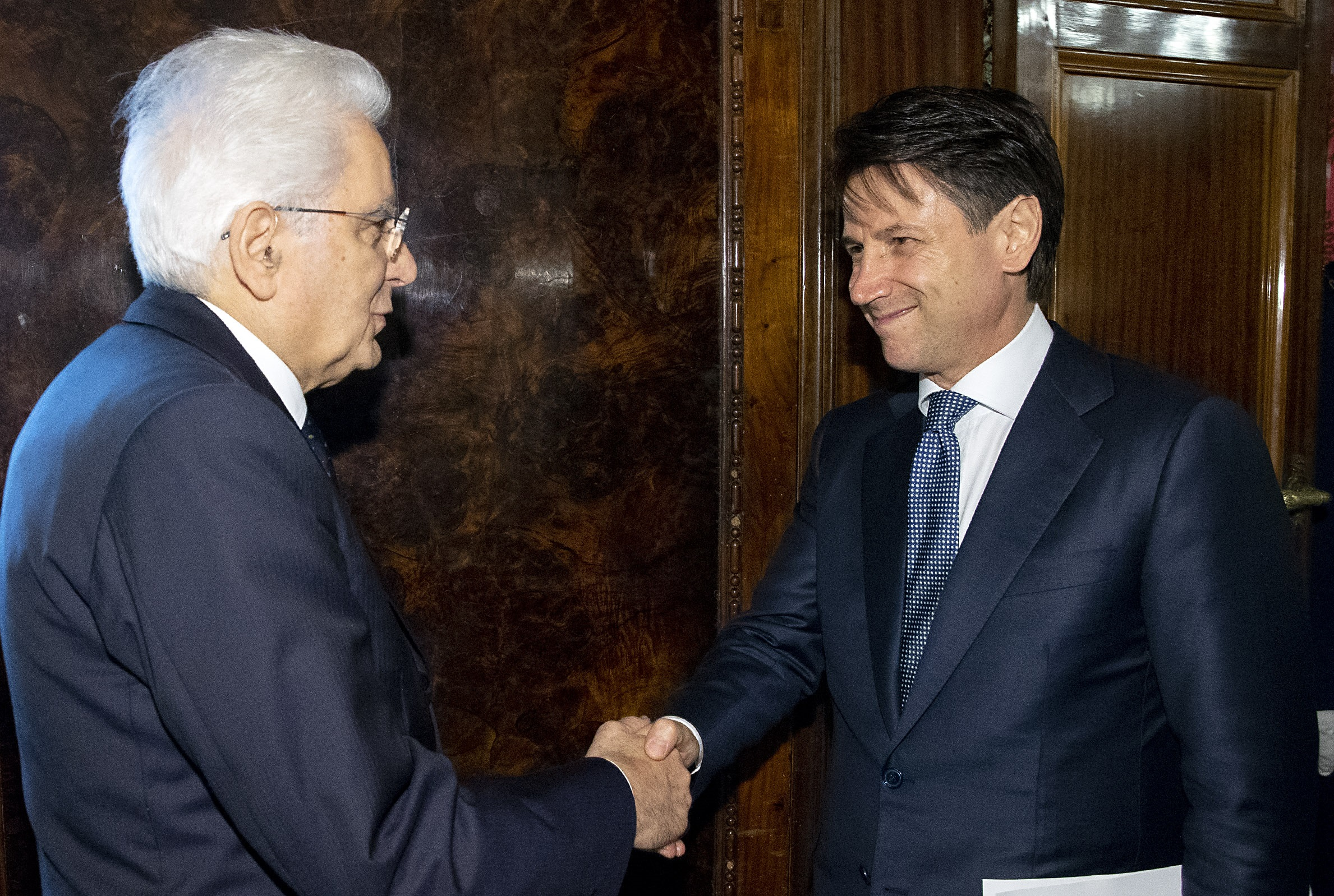
Giuseppe Conte with President Sergio Mattarella at the Quirinal Palace

The March 2018 general election resulted in a hung parliament. The M5S led by Luigi Di Maio resulted as the party with the largest number of votes and parliamentary seats, whereas the centre-right coalition in which Salvini's Lega emerged as the main political force won a plurality of seats both in the Chamber of Deputies and in the Senate of the Republic. The centre-left coalition, built around the Democratic Party (PD) led by former Prime Minister Matteo Renzi, came third. On 9 May, after weeks of political deadlock and failing attempts to form a cabinet, including possible M5S–centre-right coalition and M5S–PD coalitions, Di Maio and Salvini officially requested President Sergio Mattarella to concede them 24 hours more to strike a government agreement between their two parties. In the evening, Silvio Berlusconi publicly announced that Forza Italia (FI) would not support a M5S–Lega government on a vote of confidence but would still maintain the centre-right coalition, thus opening the door to a possible majority government between the two parties.

On 13 May, the M5S and Lega reached an agreement on a government program; however, they did not find an agreement regarding their proposal for the Prime Minister and the ministers. The M5S and Lega leaders met with President Mattarella on 14 May and asked for an additional week of negotiations. Both parties announced they would ask their respective members to vote on the government agreement by the following weekend. On 21 May, Conte (a private law professor and M5S advisor) was proposed by Di Maio and Salvini for the role of Prime Minister.

Despite reports in the media suggesting that President Mattarella had significant reservations about the direction of the new government, Conte was invited at the Quirinal Palace to receive the presidential mandate to form a new cabinet on 23 May. In his statement after the appointment, Conte said that he would be the "defense attorney of Italian people". The next day, Conte held talks with all the parliamentary parties; the government formation was soon stuck on the appointment of Paolo Savona as Minister of Economy and Finance, which was unfavoured by President Mattarella, who considered his alleged support for Italy's covert exit from the euro as an overwhelming risk for the country's economy. On 27 May, President Mattarella refused to appoint Savona, and Conte renounced his task after days of negotiation and an ultimatum by the two party leaders on Savona's nomination.

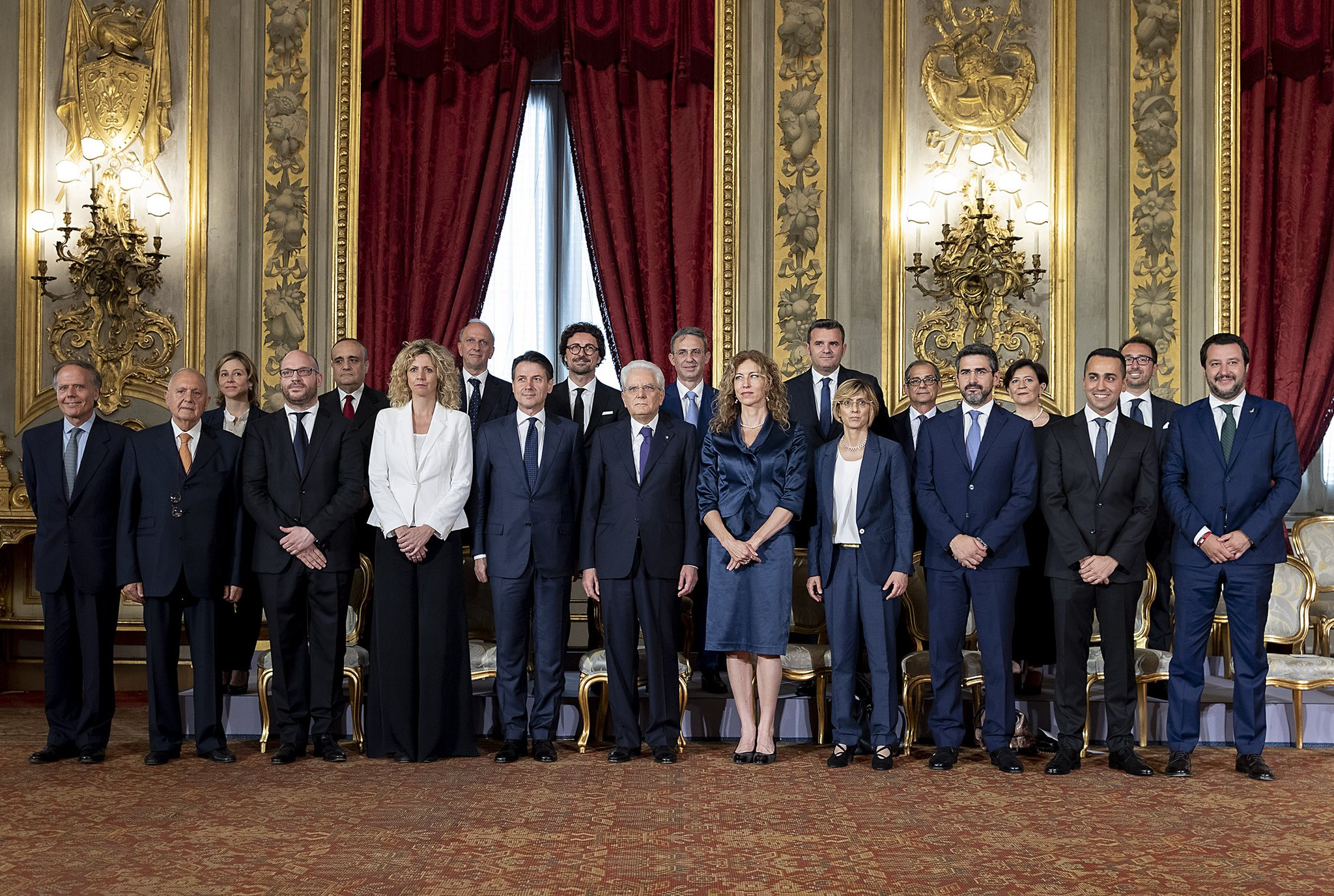
The government at the Quirinal Palace for the oath

On 28 May, President Mattarella summoned Carlo Cottarelli (a former director of the International Monetary Fund) and gave him the task to form a new government. On the same day, the PD announced that it would abstain from voting the confidence to Cottarelli while the M5S, Lega, FI, and FdI announced that they would have voted against. Cottarelli was expected to submit his list of ministers for approval to President Mattarella on 29 May; however, he held only informal consultations with the Italian President on 29 and 30 May, awaiting the possible formation of a "political government". Meanwhile, Di Maio and Salvini announced their willingness to restart negotiations to form a "political government" and Giorgia Meloni (FdI leader) gave them her support.

On 31 May, the M5S and Lega announced their new agreement on a Conte-led government with Giovanni Tria as Minister of Economy and Finance and Savona as Minister of European Affairs. Subsequently, President Mattarella summoned for the second time Conte, who announced the list of ministers. On 1 June, Prime Minister Conte and his ministers took their oaths of office and were sworn in. On 5 June, the Senate of the Republic approved the new government in a vote of confidence. On 6 June, the government was confirmed following the vote of confidence in the Chamber of Deputies. On 12 June, the cabinet appointed 6 deputy ministers and 39 undersecretaries. Of all these appointments, 25 were members of the M5S, 17 were Lega members, two were non-party independents, and one was a member of the MAIE. The M5S received four deputy ministers while Lega received two.

=== Investiture votes ===
On 5 June 2018, the first Conte government was granted the confidence of the Senate of the Republic by receiving 171 votes in favour and 117 votes against (25 senators abstained; 7 senators did not vote, among which 6 were absent). Senators for life, such as Elena Cattaneo, Mario Monti, and Liliana Segre, abstained while Carlo Rubbia, Renzo Piano, and Giorgio Napolitano did not vote. On 6 June 2018, the Government of Change received the confidence of the Chamber of Deputies by receiving 350 votes in favor and 236 votes against (35 deputies abstained; 8 deputies did not vote, among which 5 were absent).

5–6 June 2018 Investiture votes for Conte I Cabinet
House of Parliament	Vote	Parties	Votes
Senate of the Republic (Voting: 313 (Note: Absent (4): FI (3), Others (1) On institutional leave (2): Aut (1), Others (1) President (1)) of 320, Majority: 145)	Yes	M5S (109), Lega (58), MAIE (2), Others (2)	171 / 313
Senate of the Republic (Voting: 313 of 320, Majority: 145)	No	FI (57), PD (52), LeU (4), Aut (2), PSI (1), +Eu (1)	117 / 313
Senate of the Republic (Voting: 313 of 320, Majority: 145)	Abstention	FdI (18), Aut (5), Others (2)	25 / 313
Chamber of Deputies (Voting: 621 (Note: Absent (5): FI (2), FdI (1), M5S (1), PD (1) On institutional leave (2): FdI (1), M5S (1)) of 628, Majority: 294)	Yes	M5S (219), Lega (124), MAIE (6), FI (1)	350 / 621
Chamber of Deputies (Voting: 621 of 628, Majority: 294)	No	PD (110), FI (102), LeU (14), CP–AP–PSI–AC (4), NcI (3), +Eu–CD (3)	236 / 621
Chamber of Deputies (Voting: 621 of 628, Majority: 294)	Abstention	FdI (30), SVP–PATT (4), USEI (1)	35 / 621

=== Resignation ===
Conte announced his resignation on 20 August 2019, averting a no-confidence vote promoted by Salvini. The same day, President Sergio Mattarella accepted Conte's resignation and announced consultations with party leaders for the next two days. On August 22, Mattarella said some parties were trying to form "a solid majority" and he gave these political parties unti l27 August to report back to him, after which he would hold two more days of consultations. On 29 August, Mattarella tasked Conte with the formation of a new cabinet, a coalition of the M5S and the PD, which became known as the "yellow-red government" (governo giallorosso) due to their party colours. As customary, the Prime Minister-designate reserved the right to accept the mandate, pending further talks with both parties.

== Party breakdown ==
=== Beginning of term ===
==== Ministers ====
- Five Star Movement
8
- League
5
- Independents
6

==== Ministers and other members ====
- Five Star Movement (M5S): 8 ministers, 4 deputy ministers, 21 undersecretaries
- League (Lega): 5 ministers, 3 deputy ministers, 15 undersecretaries
- Associative Movement of Italians Abroad (MAIE): 1 undersecretary
- Independents: Prime minister, 5 ministers, 2 undersecretaries

=== End of term ===
==== Ministers ====
- Five Star Movement
8
- League
6
- Independents
5

==== Ministers and other members ====
- Five Star Movement (M5S): 8 ministers, 4 deputy ministers, 21 undersecretaries
- League (Lega): 6 ministers, 3 deputy ministers, 15 undersecretaries
- Associative Movement of Italians Abroad (MAIE): 1 undersecretary
- Independents: Prime minister, 4 ministers, 2 undersecretaries

== Geographical breakdown ==
A choropleth map showing how many ministers are from each region of Italy.

=== Beginning of term ===
- Northern Italy: 9 ministers
  - Lombardy: 6 ministers
  - Veneto: 3 ministers
- Central Italy: 2 ministers
  - Lazio: 2 ministers
- Southern and Insular Italy: 8 ministers (including Conte)
  - Sicily: 3 ministers
  - Apulia: 2 ministers (including Conte)
  - Campania: 2 ministers
  - Sardinia: 1 minister

=== End of term ===
- Northern Italy: 10 ministers
  - Lombardy: 7 ministers
  - Veneto: 3 ministers
- Central Italy: 2 ministers
  - Lazio: 2 ministers
- Southern and Insular Italy: 7 ministers (including Conte)
  - Sicily: 3 ministers
  - Apulia: 2 ministers (including Conte)
  - Campania: 2 ministers

== Council of Ministers ==
Office	Name	Party	Term
Prime Minister	Giuseppe Conte	Independent (Note: Proposed by the Five Star Movement)	2018–2019
Deputy Prime Minister	Matteo Salvini	League	2018–2019
Deputy Prime Minister	Luigi Di Maio	Five Star Movement	2018–2019
Minister of Foreign Affairs	Enzo Moavero Milanesi (Note: Replacing in the second selection original candidate Luca Giansanti (independent))	Independent	2018–2019
Minister of the Interior	Matteo Salvini	League	2018–2019
Minister of Justice	Alfonso Bonafede	Five Star Movement	2018–2019
Minister of Defence	Elisabetta Trenta	Five Star Movement	2018–2019
Minister of Economy and Finance	Giovanni Tria (Note: Chosen after original candidate Paolo Savona was rejected by President Sergio Mattarella)	Independent	2018–2019
Minister of Economic Development, Labour and Social Policies	Luigi Di Maio	Five Star Movement	2018–2019
Minister of Agriculture and Tourism	Gian Marco Centinaio	League	2018–2019
Minister of the Environment	Sergio Costa	Independent	2018–2019
Minister of Infrastructure and Transport	Danilo Toninelli (Note: Replacing in the second selection original candidate Mauro Coltorti (M5S).)	Five Star Movement	2018–2019
Minister of Education, University and Research	Marco Bussetti	Independent (Note: Proposed by the League)	2018–2019
Minister of Cultural Heritage and Activities	Alberto Bonisoli	Five Star Movement	2018–2019
Minister of Health	Giulia Grillo	Five Star Movement	2018–2019
Minister for Parliamentary Relations and Direct Democracy	Riccardo Fraccaro	Five Star Movement	2018–2019
Minister of Public Administration	Giulia Bongiorno	League	2018–2019
Minister of Regional Affairs	Erika Stefani	League	2018–2019
Minister for the South	Barbara Lezzi	Five Star Movement	2018–2019
Minister for Family and Disability	Lorenzo Fontana	League	2018–2019
Minister for Family and Disability	Alessandra Locatelli	League	2019
Minister of European Affairs	Paolo Savona	Independent	2018–2019
Minister of European Affairs	Lorenzo Fontana	League	2019
Secretary of the Council of Ministers	Giancarlo Giorgetti	League	2018–2019

== Composition ==
Office	Portrait	Name	Term of office	Party
Prime Minister		Giuseppe Conte	1 June 2018 – 5 September 2019	Independent
Prime Minister	Undersecretaries: Giancarlo Giorgetti (Lega) – Delegated to Sport, to the CIPE, to the Implementation of the Government Program, to Space and Aerospace Policies and to Sports Betting; Vito Crimi (M5S) – Delegated to Publishing and Information, and to the Policies aimed at the Reconstruction of Earthquake Areas; Vincenzo Spadafora (M5S) – Delegated to equal Opportunities, Youth, and National Civil Service			
Deputy Prime Minister		Matteo Salvini	1 June 2018 – 5 September 2019	League
Deputy Prime Minister		Luigi Di Maio	1 June 2018 – 5 September 2019	Five Star Movement
Minister of Foreign Affairs		Enzo Moavero Milanesi	1 June 2018 – 5 September 2019	Independent
Minister of Foreign Affairs	Deputy Minister: Emanuela Del Re (M5S); Undersecretaries: Manlio Di Stefano (M5S); Ricardo Merlo (MAIE); Guglielmo Picchi (Lega)			
Minister of the Interior		Matteo Salvini	1 June 2018 – 5 September 2019	League
Minister of the Interior	Deputy Minister: Stefano Candiani (Lega); Undersecretaries: Luigi Gaetti (M5S); Nicola Molteni (Lega); Carlo Sibilia (M5S)			
Minister of Justice		Alfonso Bonafede	1 June 2018 – 5 September 2019	Five Star Movement
Minister of Justice	Undersecretaries: Vittorio Ferraresi (M5S); Jacopo Morrone (Lega)			
Minister of Defence		Elisabetta Trenta	1 June 2018 – 5 September 2019	Five Star Movement
Minister of Defence	Undersecretaries: Angelo Tofalo (M5S); Raffaele Volpi (Lega)			
Minister of Economy and Finance		Giovanni Tria	1 June 2018 – 5 September 2019	Independent
Minister of Economy and Finance	Deputy Ministers: Laura Castelli (M5S); Massimo Garavaglia (Lega); Undersecretaries: Massimo Bitonci (Lega); Alessio Villarosa (M5S)			
Minister of Economic Development, Labour and Social Policies		Luigi Di Maio	1 June 2018 – 5 September 2019	Five Star Movement
Minister of Economic Development, Labour and Social Policies	Deputy Minister: Dario Galli (Lega) – Economic Development; Undersecretaries: Andrea Cioffi (M5S) – Economic Development; Davide Crippa (M5S) – Economic Development; Michele Geraci (Ind.) – Economic Development; Claudio Cominardi (M5S) – Labour and Social Policies; Claudio Durigon (Lega) – Labour and Social Policies			
Minister of Agriculture and Tourism		Gian Marco Centinaio	1 June 2018 – 5 September 2019	League
Minister of Agriculture and Tourism	Undersecretaries: Franco Manzato (Lega); Alessandra Pesce (M5S)			
Minister of the Environment		Sergio Costa	1 June 2018 – 5 September 2019	Independent
Minister of the Environment	Undersecretaries: Vannia Gava (Lega); Salvatore Micillo (M5S)			
Minister of Infrastructure and Transport		Danilo Toninelli	1 June 2018 – 5 September 2019	Five Star Movement
Minister of Infrastructure and Transport	Deputy Minister: Edoardo Rixi (Lega) (until 30 May 2019); Undersecretaries: Michele Dell'Orco (M5S); Armando Siri (Lega) (until 8 May 2019)			
Minister of Education, University and Research		Marco Bussetti	1 June 2018 – 5 September 2019	Independent
Minister of Education, University and Research	Deputy Minister: Lorenzo Fioramonti (M5S); Undersecretaries: Salvatore Giuliano (M5S)			
Minister of Cultural Heritage and Activities		Alberto Bonisoli	1 June 2018 – 5 September 2019	Five Star Movement
Minister of Cultural Heritage and Activities	Undersecretaries: Lucia Borgonzoni (Lega); Gianluca Vacca (M5S)			
Minister of Health		Giulia Grillo	1 June 2018 – 5 September 2019	Five Star Movement
Minister of Health	Undersecretaries: Armando Bartolazzi (M5S); Maurizio Fugatti (Lega) (until 9 November 2018); Luca Coletto (Lega) (since 29 November 2018)			
Minister for Parliamentary Relations and Direct Democracy (without portfolio)		Riccardo Fraccaro	1 June 2018 – 5 September 2019	Five Star Movement
Minister for Parliamentary Relations and Direct Democracy (without portfolio)	Undersecretaries: Guido Guidesi (Lega); Vincenzo Santangelo (M5S); Simone Valente (M5S)			
Minister of Public Administration (without portfolio)		Giulia Bongiorno	1 June 2018 – 5 September 2019	League
Minister of Public Administration (without portfolio)	Undersecretaries: Mattia Fantinati (M5S)			
Minister of Regional Affairs and Autonomies (without portfolio)		Erika Stefani	1 June 2018 – 5 September 2019	League
Minister of Regional Affairs and Autonomies (without portfolio)	Undersecretaries: Stefano Buffagni (M5S)			
Minister for the South (without portfolio)		Barbara Lezzi	1 June 2018 – 5 September 2019	Five Star Movement
Minister for the South (without portfolio)	Undersecretaries: Giuseppina Castiello (Lega)			
Minister for Family and Disability (without portfolio)		Lorenzo Fontana	1 June 2018 – 10 July 2019 (Note: Fontana resigned to become Minister of European Affairs.)	League
Minister for Family and Disability (without portfolio)		Alessandra Locatelli	10 July 2019 – 5 September 2019	League
Minister for Family and Disability (without portfolio)	Undersecretaries: Vincenzo Zoccano (M5S)			
Minister of European Affairs (without portfolio)		Paolo Savona	1 June 2018 – 8 March 2019 (Note: Savona resigned to become President of the Italian Companies and Exchange Commission, the government authority responsible for regulating the Italian securities market.)	Independent
Minister of European Affairs (without portfolio)		Giuseppe Conte (Acting)	8 March 2019 – 10 July 2019	Independent
Minister of European Affairs (without portfolio)		Lorenzo Fontana	10 July 2019 – 5 September 2019	League
Minister of European Affairs (without portfolio)	Undersecretaries: Luciano Barra Caracciolo (Ind.)			
Secretary of the Council of Ministers		Giancarlo Giorgetti	1 June 2018 – 5 September 2019	League

== Programme ==
The two parties signed a contract on a shared program on various measures. During his speech before the investiture vote in the Senate of the Republic on 5 June, Conte announced his willingness to reduce illegal immigration and increase the contrast to human traffickers and smugglers. He also advocated a fight against political corruption, the introduction of a law which regulates the conflict of interests, a new bill expanding the right of self-defense, a tax reduction, and a drastic cut to politics' costs thanks to the annuities' abolition. Conte also proposed to lift off the international sanctions against Russia.

=== Immigration ===
The coalition's immigration policy policy was led by Salvini, who acted as both Minister of the Interior and Deputy Prime Minister of Italy, a strong opponent of illegal immigration. Salvini laid out a three-point program to contrast illegal immigration, including increasing the number of repatriation centers, reducing immigration and increasing deportations of those who don ot qualify for asylum. The policy document calls for the deportation of Italy's estimated 500,000 undocumented immigrants "as a priority".

On 10 June, Salvini announced the closure of Italian ports, stating that "everyone in Europe is doing their own business, now Italy is also raising its head. Let's stop the business of illegal immigration." The following day, the ships Aquarius and SOS Méditerranée that were requesting to dock at an Italian port to disembark the rescued migrants were turned away by Italy and Malta. On the following day, Spain accepted the passengers of the Aquarius. On 18 June, Salvini announced the government would conduct a census of Romani people in Italy for the purpose of deporting all who are not in the country legally; however, this measure was criticised as unconstitutional and was attacked by the opposition and also by some members of the M5S.

=== Taxes and politicians' salaries and pensions ===
The Government of Change pledged to reform the Italian tax system by introducing flat taxes (a long-time goal of Berlusconi and the broader centre-right coalition) for businesses and individuals, with a no-tax area for low-income households and corrections to keep some degree of tax progression (as required by the Constitution of Italy). The governing parties intended to cut the pensions and annuities of members of the Parliament, as well as regional councillors and those employed by constitutional bodies. They also intended to review all monthly pensions exceeding the amount contributed while working by more than 5,000 euros.

=== Direct democracy ===
The governing coalition pledged to use direct democracy via referendum. Riccardo Fraccaro, a M5S long-time advocate of such votes, became the world's first Minister for Direct Democracy, advocating a lowering of the 50% participation quorum for referendums in Italy to be valid and the introduction of citizens' initiatives for new laws.

=== Public health ===
The governing parties pledged to reform the public health system to minimise inefficiencies and wastefulness of resources. The government contract featured the digitalisation of the public health system, enhanced transparency, improved governance in the pharmaceutical sector, centralisation of purchases, fight against corruption, new procedures for the accreditation of private clinics, implementation of tele-medicine, and improvement of home care. The parties envisioned a health system mostly supported by the fiscal system, with minimal contribution from the patients. They also pledged to reduce the waiting times for a specialist visit or for emergency care in public hospitals.

=== Public water ===
The parties intend to practically implement the result of the 2011 Italian referendums on public water, which resulted in the repeal of the law allowing the privatisation of water services. The parties pledged to guarantee the quality of public water in all the municipalities by improving the water transport network, minimising the leaks and replacing old pipelines that may still contain asbestos and lead.

=== Agriculture, fishing, and Made in Italy ===
The coalition intended to promote a reform of the Common Agricultural Policy of the European Union in a way that supports the Italian agriculture but at the same time protects landscape and water resources and guarantees food safety. Small-scale agriculture and fishing should also be protected and the typical and traditional local productions should be safeguarded. Furthermore, the parties intend to promote the national productions within the trading treaties between the European Union and other countries and to protect the Made in Italy brand through proper labeling.

=== Environment, green economy, and circular economy ===
The parties pledged to increase the public awareness about environmental issues and enforce measures of prevention and maintenance of the environment in order to mitigate the risk related to landslides, hydrogeology, and floods. They also planned to devote special attention to the issues raised by climate change and pollution. They intended to promote a green economy and support research, innovation, and training for ecology-related employment to increase the competitiveness and sustainability of the industry and reduce the dependence on fossil fuels. They also intended to promote a circular economy for a sustainable waste management based on enhanced recycling and regeneration. Finally, the parties planned to arrest land consumption through strategies of urban renewal and retrofit of private and public buildings and infrastructure, with increase of energy efficiency and the promotion of distributed energy generation.
