= Higher Health Council =

Advisory body to the Italian Ministry of Health

The Higher Health Council (Consiglio Superiore di Sanità) is the senior advisory body of the Ministry of Health in Italy.

Roberta Siliquini, Vice-dean of the Università degli Studi di Torino was appointed president of the council in December 2017 for a three-year term. In December 2018 she was sacked by Giulia Grillo, the minister of health, along with 30 other members of the council. Grillo said it was time to make room for the new.
