= Marzia Bolpagni =

Italian digital-construction engineer

- Born: Italy
- Citizenship: Italy
- Education: University of Brescia (MSc); Politecnico di Milano (PhD)
- Known for: Co-author of the 4th BIM Handbook; Lead author of ISO 7817-1 “Level of Information Need”
- Awards: Sir George Macfarlane Medal (2021); Women of the Future Award (2021); Top 50 Women in Engineering (2023)
- Scientific career
- Fields: Digital engineering; Building information modelling
- Workplaces: Mace; University College London; Northumbria University

Marzia Bolpagni is an Italian engineer who specialises in digital construction and building information modelling (BIM). She is Associate Director and Head of BIM International at the global consultant and contractor Mace, and holds visiting and honorary academic posts in the United Kingdom. She is one of four authors of the fourth edition of the standard reference work BIM Handbook (2025).

== Education ==
Bolpagni completed an MSc in building and civil engineering at the University of Brescia, where she first became interested in BIM. She earned a PhD in ICT and Smart Construction at the Politecnico di Milano in 2018.

== Career ==
After research roles in Italy, Finland, the United States and the UK, Bolpagni joined Mace in 2017 and was promoted to Head of BIM International in 2021. She is Honorary Lecturer at the Bartlett School of Sustainable Construction, University College London, and Visiting Professor at Northumbria University, funded through the Royal Academy of Engineering programme.

Bolpagni has led international standardisation work on information management. She was lead author of ISO 7817-1, which defines the “Level of Information Need” in BIM projects. The fourth edition of the BIM Handbook, published by Wiley in March 2025, adds Bolpagni to the author team with Rafael Sacks, Ghang Lee and Luciana Burdi. In her chapters Bolpagni analyses data-exchange requirements, the evolution of international BIM standards and the ethical challenges of digital transformation in construction.

== Honours and awards ==
- Young Engineer of the Year and Sir George Macfarlane Medal (Royal Academy of Engineering, 2021).
- Women of the Future Award – Real Estate, Infrastructure & Construction (2021).
- Listed in the Top 50 Women in Engineering – Safety & Security by the UK Women's Engineering Society (2023).

== Selected works ==
- Rafael Sacks; Ghang Lee; Luciana Burdi; Marzia Bolpagni (2025). BIM Handbook: A Guide to Building Information Modeling for Owners, Designers, Engineers, Contractors, and Facility Managers (4th ed.). John Wiley & Sons. ISBN 978-1-394-22223-0.
