= Sicily 2 (Chamber of Deputies constituency) =

- Chamber of Deputies; Electoral constituency
- Region: Sicily
- Electorate: 2,111,649 (2018)
- Major settlements: Catania, Enna, Messina, Ragusa, Siracusa

Current constituency
- Created: 1993
- Seats: 24
- Members: M5S (16); FI (3); PD (2); Lega (1); FdI (1); LeU (1)

Sicily 2 is one of the 29 constituencies (Italian: circoscrizioni) represented in the Chamber of Deputies, the lower house of the Italian parliament. The constituency currently elects 24 deputies. Its boundaries correspond to those of the Metropolitan City of Catania and the provinces of Enna, Messina, Ragusa and Siracusa, within the Sicily region. The electoral system uses a parallel voting system, which act as a mixed system, with 37% of seats allocated using a first-past-the-post electoral system and 61% using a proportional method, with one round of voting.

The constituency was first established by the Mattarella law on 4 August 1993 and later confirmed by the Calderoli law on 21 December 2005 and by the Rosato law on 3 November 2017.

== Members of the Parliament ==
=== 2018–present ===
Single-member districts
District			Deputy	Party
N.	Name	Map	Deputy	Party
01	Messina		Francesco D'Uva	Five Star Movement
02	Barcellona Pozzo di Gotto		Alessio Villarosa	Five Star Movement
03	Enna		Andrea Giarrizzo	Five Star Movement
04	Acireale		Giulia Grillo	Five Star Movement
05	Catania		Maria Luisa Paxia	Five Star Movement
06	Misterbianco		Simona Suriano	Five Star Movement
07	Paternò		Eugenio Saitta	Five Star Movement
08	Ragusa		Marialucia Lorefice	Five Star Movement
09	Avola		Maria Marzana	Five Star Movement
10	Siracusa		Paolo Ficara	Five Star Movement

Multi-member districts
District			Party	Deputy
N.	Name	Map	Party	Deputy
01	Sicily 2 – 01		Five Star Movement	Angela Raffa
01	Sicily 2 – 01		Five Star Movement	Antonella Papiro
01	Sicily 2 – 01		Forza Italia	Antonino Germanà
01	Sicily 2 – 01		Democratic Party	Pietro Navarra
01	Sicily 2 – 01		League	Carmelo Lo Monte
01	Sicily 2 – 01		Brothers of Italy	Carmela Bucalo
01	Sicily 2 – 01		Free and Equal	Guglielmo Epifani
02	Sicily 2 – 02		Five Star Movement	Santi Cappellani
02	Sicily 2 – 02		Five Star Movement	Luciano Cantone
02	Sicily 2 – 02		Forza Italia	Antonino Minardo
03	Sicily 2 – 03		Five Star Movement	Gianluca Rizzo
03	Sicily 2 – 03		Five Star Movement	Filippo Scerra
03	Sicily 2 – 03		Forza Italia	Stefania Prestigiacomo
03	Sicily 2 – 03		Democratic Party	Fausto Raciti
