= Dell'Orco =

Dell'Orco is an Italian language surname.

== List of people with the surname ==
- Cristian Dell'Orco (born 1994), Italian footballer
- Michele Dell'Orco (born 1985), Italian politician

== See also ==
- Dell'Orto
