= Danilo Toninelli =

Italian politician

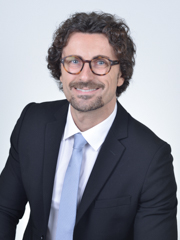

Minister of Infrastructure and Transport
- In office 1 June 2018 – 5 September 2019
- Prime Minister: Giuseppe Conte
- Preceded by: Graziano Delrio
- Succeeded by: Paola De Micheli

Member of the Senate of the Republic
- In office 23 March 2018 – 12 October 2022
- Constituency: Lombardia

Member of the Chamber of Deputies
- In office 15 March 2013 – 22 March 2018
- Constituency: Lombardia 3

Personal details
- Born: 2 August 1974 (age 52) Soresina, Italy
- Party: Five Star Movement
- Education: University of Brescia

Danilo Toninelli (born 2 August 1974) is an Italian politician.

== Biography ==
Toninelli was born in Soresina on 2 August 1974. He graduated in law at the University of Brescia in 1999.

From 1999 to 2001 he was an Officer within the Carabinieri Corps. Before being elected deputy, he worked as a technical inspector for an insurance company until 2013.

== Political career ==
In 2010, Toninelli was candidate for regional councillor with the Five Star Movement in the Lombard regional election, but he was not elected. He was elected Deputy in the 2013 Italian general election and from 7 May 2013 to 20 July 2015 he was Vice-President of the 1st Committee (Constitutional Affairs of the Council Presidency and Interior) of the Chamber of Deputies, while subsequently he became a member of the "Standing Committee of the opinions" and of the council for the regulation of the Chamber.

In the 2018 general election he was elected senator and on 27 March 2018 he became head of the M5S group in the Senate.

On 1 June 2018 Toninelli was appointed Minister of Infrastructure and Transport of the Conte Cabinet.

== Critics and political gaffes ==
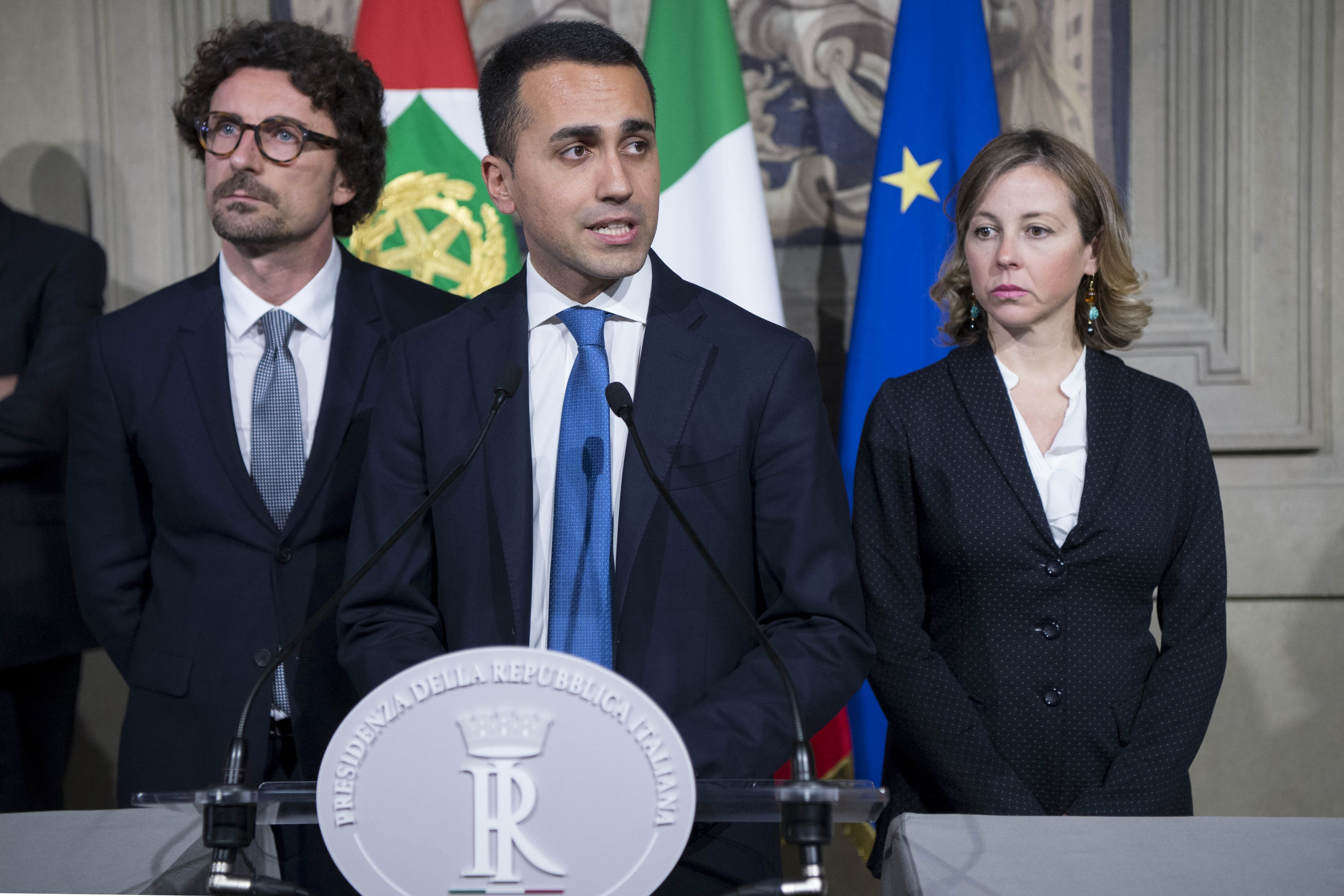
Toninelli alongside Luigi Di Maio and Giulia Grillo

Since the inauguration of the government in June 2018, Toninelli has often been the handle to which the Parliamentary opposition clung to define the Conte Cabinet as "unprepared" and "incompetent".

In September 2018, in the report to the Chambers, Toninelli denounced "pressures" he suffered from "AISCAT" (Italian association of motorway companies and tunnels) not to publish "the motorway concession contracts and all related annexes", with the opposition calling him for better clarity; two days later Toninelli presented the offending documents, which however proved to be issued in months of January and March and addressed to his predecessor, Graziano Delrio.

Later that same month, Toninelli announced the decree on the reconstruction of Ponte Morandi, after its partial collapse that killed 43 people, proposing the idea of a "livable bridge where to eat and have fun"—definition that has left many colleagues confused and Genoa people offended.

In October 2018 Toninelli spoke about the "sectoral limitations by South Tyrol authorities that strongly damage the economy of Italy" referring to the Brenner Pass, which however he erroneously called multiple times as the "Brenner Tunnel".
