= Trigilia =

Trigilia is an Italian surname. Notable people with the surname include:

- Carlo Trigilia (born 1951), Italian academic and politician
- Loredana Trigilia (born 1976), Italian wheelchair fencer
