= Claudio De Vincenti =

Italian politician

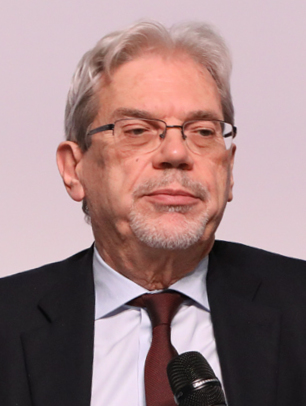

Minister for Territorial Cohesion and South
- In office 16 December 2016 – 1 June 2018
- Prime Minister: Paolo Gentiloni
- Preceded by: Carlo Trigilia (2013-2014)
- Succeeded by: Barbara Lezzi

Secretary of the Council of Ministers
- In office 2 April 2015 – 16 December 2016
- Prime Minister: Matteo Renzi
- Preceded by: Graziano Delrio
- Succeeded by: Maria Elena Boschi

Personal details
- Born: 28 October 1948 (age 77) Rome, Italy
- Party: Democratic Party
- Education: Sapienza University of Rome

Claudio De Vincenti (born 28 October 1948) is an Italian politician, economist and university professor.

== Early life and career ==
De Vincenti was born in Rome in 1948. After graduating at the Sapienza University of Rome, he started his academic career. He is professor of political economy at the Faculty of Economics of the Sapienza University and collaborator of Lavoce.info.

== Politics ==
On 29 November 2011 he was appointed undersecretary to the Ministry of Economic Development of the government of Mario Monti. On 2 May 2013, he was confirmed in that role in the Letta's government.

On 28 February 2014 he became Deputy Minister for Economic Development in the government of Matteo Renzi, who later appointed him Secretary of the Council of Ministers on 2 April 2015.

On 12 December 2016, Renzi resigned as Prime Minister after having lost the 2016 Italian constitutional referendum; the new Prime Minister Paolo Gentiloni appointed De Vincenti as Minister for Territorial Cohesion and South, a position that he held until 1 June 2018.

In the 2018 general election, De Vincenti was initially excluded from the Democratic Party lists; however, he was later candidated for the Chamber of Deputies in the single-member constituency of Sassuolo, the district in which Gianni Cuperlo, the initial candidate of the party renounced to run. However De Vincenti was defeated by the center-right candidate Benedetta Fiorini.

Since March 2021, he has been the president of Aeroporti di Roma.

== Publications ==
- Marx e Sraffa. Note su un dibattito di teoria economica, Napoli, De Donato, 1978.
- L'economia di tipo sovietico. Impresa, disequilibrio, ordini e prezzi, Roma, NIS, 1989.
- L'economia delle relazioni. Ricchezza e occupazione nell'età postindustriale, con Alessandro Montebugnoli, Roma, Laterza, 1997.
- Introduzione alla macroeconomia, Roma, NIS, 1997.
- La riforma della regolazione nei settori di competenza del CIPE e dei ministeri, Milano, Franco Angeli, 2002.
- Macroeconomia. Elementi di base, Roma, Carocci, 2003.
- Approfondimenti di macroeconomia, Roma, Carocci, 2003.
- La partita doppia del welfare : una base informativa originale per dibattere di tassazione e riforma dell'intervento pubblico : 14º Rapporto CER-SPI, con Corrado Pollastri, Roma, Ediesse, 2004.
- Temi di macroeconomia contemporanea. Nuovi classici vs nuovi keynesiani, con Enrico Marchetti, Roma, Carocci, 2005.
- Le virtù della concorrenza. Regolazione e mercato nei servizi di pubblica utilità, con Adriana Vigneri, Bologna, Il mulino, 2006.
- Idee per l'Italia. Mercato e stato, con Michele Grillo, Milano, F. Brioschi, 2010.
- Manuale di economia politica, con Enrico Saltari e Riccardo Tilli, Roma, Carocci, 2010.
- Fair, robust and sustainable. A recipe for Europes growth, Roma, Fondazione Italianieuropei, 2011.
- La sanità in Italia. Organizzazione, governo, regolazione, mercato, con Renato Finocchi Ghersi e Andrea Tardiola, Bologna, Il mulino, 2011.
