= Minister for the South and Cohesion Policies =

Ministry in the Cabinet of Italy

Minister for Cohesion Policies
- Ministro per le Politiche di Coesione
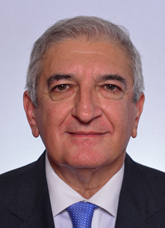
- Incumbent; Tommaso Foti since 2 December 2024
- Ministry for the South and Territorial Cohesion
- Member of: Council of Ministers
- Seat: Rome
- Appointer: The president of Italy
- Term length: No fixed term
- Formation: April 23, 2005; 21 years ago
- First holder: Gianfranco Miccichè
- Website: www.ministroperilsud.gov.it

The minister for cohesion policies (Italian: ministro per le politiche di coesione) in Italy is one of the positions in the Italian government. The current minister is Tommaso Foti, of Brothers of Italy, who is serving since 2 December 2024; while Luigi Sbarra, an independent, is currently serving as Undersecretary delegated to the South since 12 June 2025.

From 1964 to 1987 and, again, from 1988 to 1993 Italian governments included a "minister for the extraordinary interventions in the Mezzogiorno" (1964–1966, 1972–1987, 1988–1993) or a "minister for the extraordinary interventions in the Mezzogiorno and the depressed areas" (1966–1972). Mezzogiorno is an alternative name for Southern Italy. The office was notably held by Paolo Emilio Taviani (1968–1972, 1972–1973), Giulio Andreotti (1974–1976) and Ciriaco De Mita (1976–1979).

== List of ministers ==
Parties

- Forza Italia / The People of Freedom
- Democratic Party
- Brothers of Italy
- Independent

Coalitions

- Centre-right coalition
- Centre-left coalition
- Mixed coalition

Portrait	Name (Born–Died)	Term of office			Party	Government	Ref.
Portrait	Name (Born–Died)	Took office	Left office	Time in office	Party	Government	Ref.
Minister for Development and Territorial Cohesion
	Gianfranco Miccichè (1954–)	23 April 2005	17 May 2006	1 year, 24 days	Forza Italia	Berlusconi III	
Office not in use		2006–2010				Prodi II	
Office not in use		2006–2010				Berlusconi IV	
Minister of Regional Affairs and Territorial Cohesion
	Raffaele Fitto (1969– )	10 June 2010	16 November 2011	1 year, 159 days	The People of Freedom	Berlusconi IV	
Minister for Territorial Cohesion
	Fabrizio Barca (1954–)	16 November 2011	28 April 2013	1 year, 163 days	Independent	Monti	
	Carlo Trigilia (1951–)	28 April 2013	22 February 2014	300 days	Democratic Party	Letta	
Office not in use		2014–2016				Renzi	
Minister of Territorial Cohesion and the South
	Claudio De Vincenti (1948–)	12 December 2016	1 June 2018	1 year, 171 days	Democratic Party	Gentiloni	
Minister for the South
	Barbara Lezzi (1972– )	1 June 2018	5 September 2019	1 year, 96 days	Five Star Movement	Conte I	
	Giuseppe Provenzano (1982–)	5 September 2019	13 February 2021	1 year, 161 days	Democratic Party	Conte II	
Minister for the South and Territorial Cohesion
	Mara Carfagna (1975–)	13 February 2021	22 October 2022	1 year, 251 days	Forza Italia / Action	Draghi	
Minister for European Affairs, Southern Italy, Cohesion Policy and the NRRP
	Raffaele Fitto (1969–)	22 October 2022	30 November 2024	2 years, 39 days	Brothers of Italy	Meloni	
Minister for European Affairs, Cohesion Policy and the NRRP
	Tommaso Foti (1960– )	2 December 2024	Incumbent	1 year, 279 days	Brothers of Italy	Meloni	
