= Marco Bussetti =

Italian teacher and public manager (born 1962)

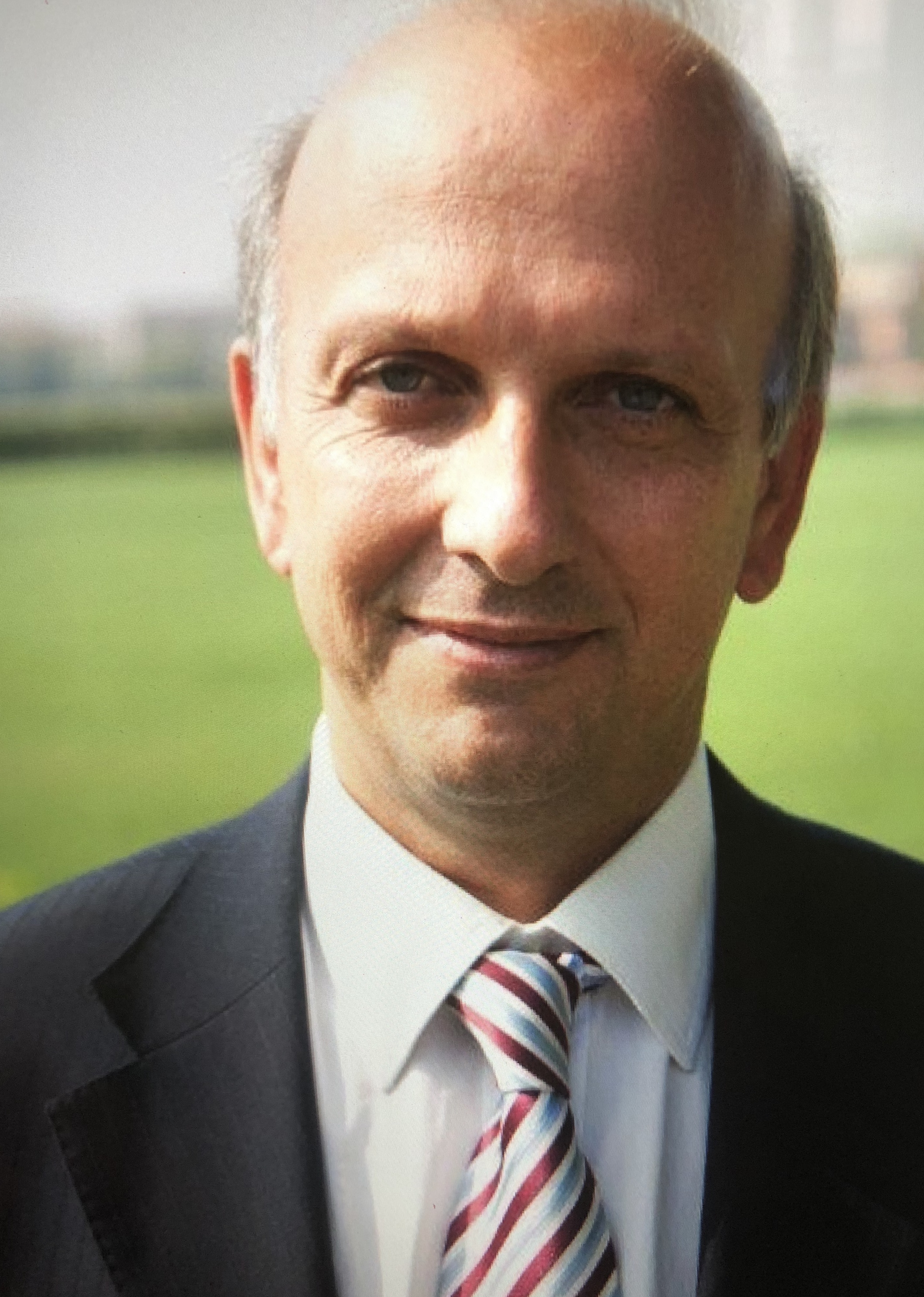

Minister of Education, University and Research
- In office 1 June 2018 – 5 September 2019
- Prime Minister: Giuseppe Conte
- Preceded by: Valeria Fedeli
- Succeeded by: Lorenzo Fioramonti

Personal details
- Born: 28 May 1962 (age 64) Gallarate, Italy
- Party: Independent
- Education: Università Cattolica del Sacro Cuore

Marco Bussetti (born 28 May 1962) is an Italian teacher and public manager, who served in the government of Italy as Minister of Education, University and Research between 1 June 2018 and 5 September 2019.

== Biography ==
Bussetti was born in Gallarate on 28 May 1962. He graduated in "Sciences and Techniques of Preventive and Adapted Motory Activity" at the Università Cattolica del Sacro Cuore. He taught physical education at middle-school level and basketball coach. He has also held various teaching positions at the University of Milan, for the "Sport Management, Marketing and Sociology" University Master; at the Università Cattolica del Sacro Cuore; and at the University of Insubria of Varese, Faculty of Medicine and Surgery, Degree Course in Motor Sciences.

In 2015, Bussetti became responsible for the X Area (Milan) of the Lombardy Regional School Office. On 1 June 2018, Bussetti was appointed Minister of Education, University and Research of the first Conte government. That same year, he received the America Award from the Italy-USA Foundation.

== Basetti–Versaldi agreement on the religious education ==
On 13 February 2019, Bussetti signed an agreement with cardinal Giuseppe Versaldi concerning the teaching of the Roman Catholic religion within the Italian state-owned primary and secondary schools. For the first time since the Lateran Treaty of 1929 the Italian state recognized the degrees released by the private pontifical universities, whereas until 2012 the sole degree in Holy Scripture could be recognized for the teaching in Italian public schools and only after a specific decree of the Italian Ministry of Education. In 2020, the agreement gave birth to a ministerial decree which significantly increased the number of degree titles recognized in the Italian public schools. The first recruiting campaign with a public and open selection is forecasted within December 2021. As of June 2021, the detailed selection notice has not been published yet.
