= Antonino Germanà =

Italian politician (born 1976)

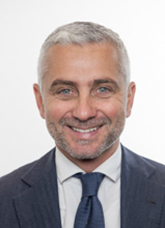
- Germanà in 2018

Member of the Senate
- Incumbent
- Assumed office 13 October 2022
- Constituency: Sicily

Member of the Chamber of Deputies
- In office 23 March 2018 – 12 October 2022
- Constituency: Sicily 2
- In office 29 April 2008 – 7 December 2012
- Constituency: Sicily 2

Personal details
- Born: 12 April 1976 (age 50)
- Party: Lega (since 2021)
- Parent: Basilio Germanà (father)

Antonino Salvatore Germanà (born 12 April 1976) is an Italian politician serving as a member of the Senate since 2022. He was a member of the Chamber of Deputies from 2008 to 2012 and from 2018 to 2022.
