= Mattia Fantinati =

Italian politician

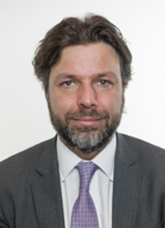

Sottosegretario di Stato al Ministero per la pubblica amministrazione
- In office 12 June 2018 – 5 September 2019
- President: Giuseppe Conte
- Preceded by: Angelo Rughetti

Deputy of the Italian Republic
- Incumbent
- Assumed office 15 March 2013
- District: Veneto 1 (XVII); Veneto 2 (XVIII)
- Parliamentary group: Movimento 5 Stelle

Personal details
- Party: 5 Star Movement
- Education: Università degli Studi di Brescia, Università Commerciale Luigi Bocconi, Università di Pechino, London School of Economics and Political Science
- Occupation: Engineer
- Degree: Management engineering

Mattia Fantinati (Nogara, 12 April 1975) is an Italian politician. He was the Undersecretary of the State for Public Administration and Member of Italian Parliament in the XVII and XVIII legislatures.

== Biography ==
Born in Nogara, Fantinati grew up in Verona where he graduated from the Liceo Scientifico Statale "Angelo Messedaglia".

In 1999 he graduated in Management Engineering at the University of Brescia, subsequently achieving a series of specializations in the economic field in Italy and abroad, such at the SDA Bocconi School of Management and the Manchester Metropolitan University. Fantinati continued in 2006 in China, with a second degree from the University of Peking and then at the LSE (London School of Economics and Political Science), which was followed by participation in the entrepreneurial economic mission to China. (Nanjing, Guangzhou).

The experience gained within Italian and foreign companies and multinationals led him to specialize in the new technology sectors systems in Italy.

He was councillor of the Order of Engineers of Verona from 2010 to 2014 and referent of the National Network of Young Engineers.

== Political career ==
In the Italian political elections of 2013 he was elected deputy of the XVII legislature of the Italian Republic in the VII Veneto 1 district for the 5 Star Movement. In the same year, he joined the X Commission for Industry, Commerce, Energy, Research and Tourism. As a member of this commission, he participated in October 2013 in the Confindustria mission to the United States (New York, Washington). Since March 2014 he has been a member of the Parliamentary Commission of Inquiry into the phenomena of counterfeiting, commercial piracy and illegal trade.

On 28 June 2013, he presented the bill concerning the exemption of micro-enterprises from the regional tax on productive activities (IRAP).

On 27 March 2014, he presented a second law proposal on the subject of composition with creditors and the discipline of the tax settlement.

On 10 December 2013, an amendment to the Finance Law relating to delocalization was presented and approved, in detail: companies that relocate outside the European Union and reduce staff by 50% lose public incentives and must return those received.

On 5 February 2014, an amendment was presented and approved in the DL "Destination Italy" for the compensation of tax bills in favour of companies holding unsecured, certain, liquid and collectable credits, for administration, supplies, contracts and services, including professional ones, accrued in relation to the public administration and certified in accordance with the procedures set out in the decrees of the Ministry of Economy and Finance for the year 2014.

On 20 November 2014, an amendment was presented and approved in the "2014 Stability Law" which extends the compensation of tax bills in favour of companies holding receivables from the Public Administration to 2015. On 26 August 2015 he spoke at the Rimini Meeting of Communion and Liberation invited by his friend Raffaello Vignali. It was the first time in history that a member of the 5 Star Movement was invited to take the stage of the event organized by CL. Fantinati's speech was very severe and critical of the Catholic movement. In his speech, the deputy criticized CL for «having transformed the spiritual experience into a screen of personal interests, aimed always and in any case at money and power», «Having generated a political power capable of influencing health care, private Catholic schools, universities and procurement. Always on the side of the powerful, always on the side of those in charge. Always in the name of God.» According to those who saw him, before his speech, Fantinati received a call from the leaders of his party who basically dictated the speech to be made. In fact, the moderator showed himself agitated and sweating.

Re-elected deputy in the plurinominal of Veneto, on 12 June 2018 he became undersecretary of the Public Administration in the "Giuseppe Conte Government" composed of 5 Stars and League. In February 2019 he attended the birth of the Social Academy, a training institution that promotes the digitization of public entities and companies, in particular through "Binario F", a hub of LVenture and LUISS EnLabs managed by Facebook at Roma Termini station.

During his tenure he was a member of the Foreign Affairs Commission in which he deals with the issues of cybersecurity and digital cooperation relations on human rights; he was also a member of the parliamentary group on Artificial Intelligence at the OECD and an expert parliamentarian in the IPU group on digital issues.

He was president of the Italian parliamentary intergroup on digital transformation and internet governance[11] of the XVIII Legislature.

During the Conte II government, he was appointed as international relations advisor of the Ministry of Innovation and Digitization of the Public Administration.

For the Italian Government, he followed the initiatives of the international and Italian Internet Governance Forum and of the HLPDC (High Level Panel of Digital Cooperation) at the United Nations.

He was appointed by the Secretary-General of the United Nations as a member of the MAG (Multistakeholder Advisory Group) which has the purpose of providing advice to the Secretary-General on IGF.

In July 2020 he was elected president of IGF Italia.

== See also ==
- 2013 Italian general election
- Legislature XVII of Italy
- Five Star Movement
