= Minister of Infrastructure and Transport (Italy) =

Ministry in the Cabinet of Italy

Minister of Infrastructures and Transport
- Ministro delle Infrastrutture e dei Trasporti

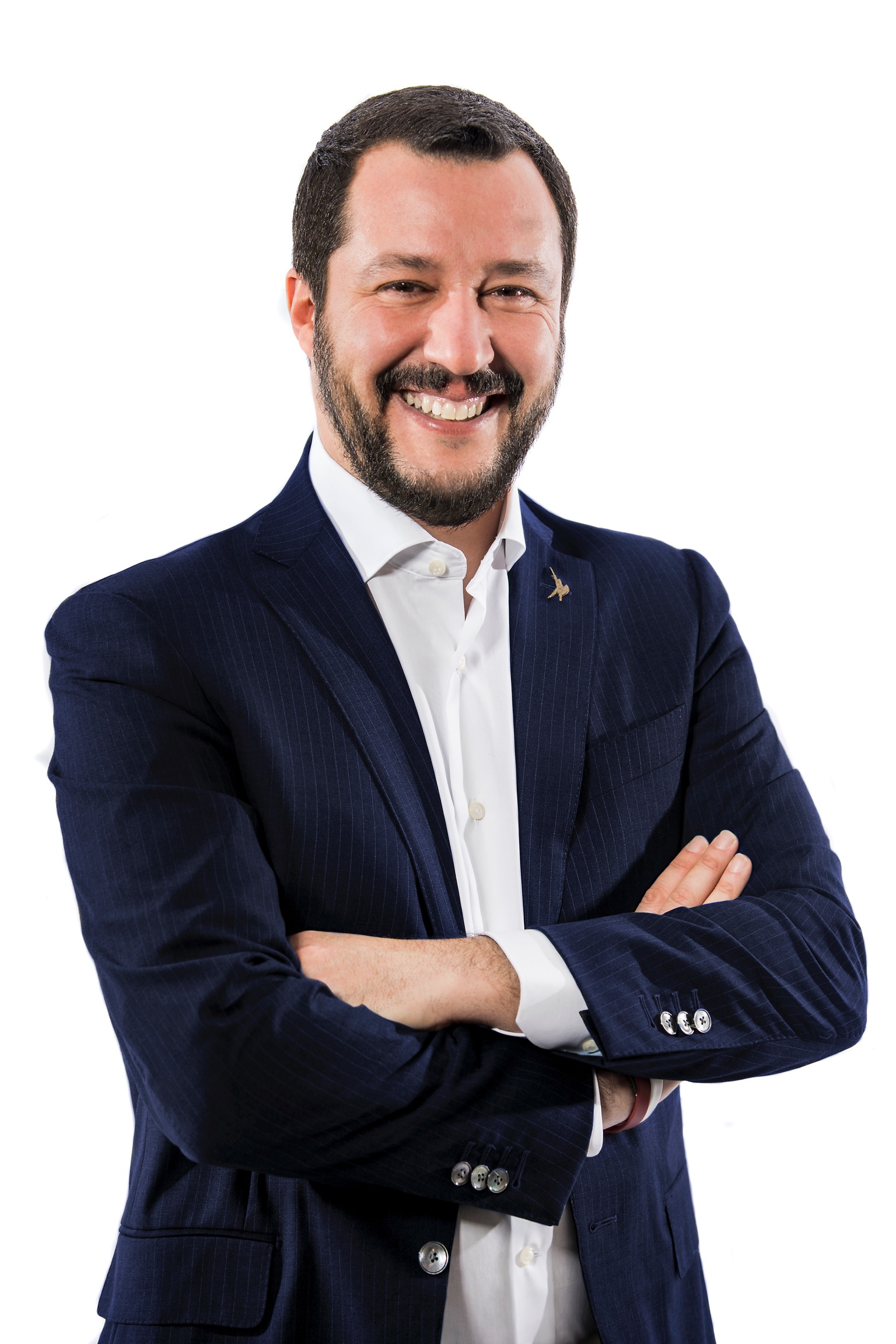
- Incumbent; Matteo Salvini since 22 October 2022
- Member of: Council of Ministers
- Seat: Rome
- Appointer: The president of Italy
- Term length: No fixed term
- Formation: June 11, 2001; 25 years ago
- First holder: Pietro Lunardi
- Website: www.mit.gov.it/en

This is a list of the ministers of infrastructure and transport, whose office name and portfolio have undergone variations over the last decades. The current minister is Matteo Salvini, leader of the League, who has been in office since 22 October 2022.

In 2021 the ministry was renamed Ministry of Sustainable Infrastructure and Mobility. However, it reverted to its previous name in November 2022.

== List of ministers of infrastructures and transports ==
=== Since 2001 ===
Parties

- Forza Italia / The People of Freedom
- New Centre-Right
- Democratic Party
- Five Star Movement
- League
- Independent

Coalitions

- Centre-right coalition
- Centre-left coalition
- Mixed coalition

Portrait	Name (Born–Died)	Term of office			Party	Government	Ref.
Portrait	Name (Born–Died)	Took office	Left office	Time in office	Party	Government	Ref.
Minister of Infrastructure and Transport
	Pietro Lunardi (1939– )	11 June 2001	17 May 2006	4 years, 340 days	Forza Italia	Berlusconi II·III	
Office not in use		2006–2008				Prodi II	
	Altero Matteoli (1940–2017)	8 May 2008	16 November 2011	3 years, 192 days	The People of Freedom	Berlusconi IV	
	Corrado Passera (1954– )	16 November 2011	28 April 2013	1 year, 163 days	Independent	Monti	
	Maurizio Lupi (1954– )	28 April 2013	20 March 2015	1 year, 326 days	The People of Freedom / New Centre-Right	Letta	
	Maurizio Lupi (1954– )	28 April 2013	20 March 2015	1 year, 326 days	The People of Freedom / New Centre-Right	Renzi	
	Graziano Delrio (1960– )	2 April 2015	1 June 2018	3 years, 60 days	Democratic Party	Renzi; Gentiloni	
	Danilo Toninelli (1974– )	1 June 2018	5 September 2019	1 year, 96 days	Five Star Movement	Conte I	
	Paola De Micheli (1973– )	5 September 2019	13 February 2021	1 year, 161 days	Democratic Party	Conte II	
Minister of Sustainable Infrastructure and Mobility
	Enrico Giovannini (1957– )	13 February 2021	22 October 2022	1 year, 251 days	Independent	Draghi	
Minister of Infrastructure and Transport
	Matteo Salvini (1973– )	22 October 2022	Incumbent	3 years, 321 days	League	Meloni	
