= Gianluca Rizzo =

Italian politician (born 1974)

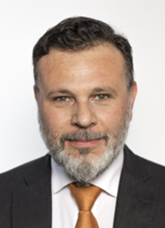
- Rizzo in 2018

Member of the Chamber of Deputies
- In office 15 March 2013 – 12 October 2022
- Constituency: Sicily 2 (2013–2018); Sicily 2 – P03 (2018–2022)

Personal details
- Born: 26 April 1974 (age 52)
- Party: Independent (since 2022)
- Other political affiliations: Five Star Movement (2013–2022); Together for the Future (2022)

Gianluca Rizzo (born 26 April 1974) is an Italian politician. From 2013 to 2022, he was a member of the Chamber of Deputies. From 2018 to 2022, he served as chairman of the Defence Committee.
