= Barbara Lezzi =

Italian politician

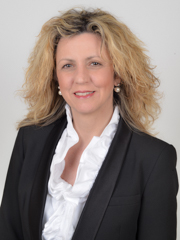

Minister for the South
- In office 1 June 2018 – 5 September 2019
- Prime Minister: Giuseppe Conte
- Preceded by: Claudio De Vincenti
- Succeeded by: Peppe Provenzano

Member of the Senate
- In office 15 March 2013 – 13 October 2022
- Constituency: Apulia

Personal details
- Born: 24 April 1972 (age 53) Lecce, Italy
- Party: Five Star Movement (2009-2021)
- Height: 1.77 m (5 ft 10 in)
- Occupation: Politician

Barbara Lezzi (born 24 April 1972 in Lecce) is an Italian politician, who served in the government of Italy as Minister for the South from 1 June 2018 until 5 September 2019.

== Biography ==
Barbara Lezzi was born in Lecce on 24 April 1972. She took a diploma at the Commercial Technical Institute "Deledda" of Lecce and in 1992 she was taken as an employee by a company in the commerce sector.

== Political career ==
She was elected Senator for the first time in the 2013 Italian general election. Subsequently, she became Vice-Chairman of the Standing Committee on Budget and Economic Planning and member of the Standing Committee on European Policies. She was re-elected Senator in the 2018 Italian general election.

On 1 June 2018, she was appointed Minister for Southern Italy of the Conte Cabinet.

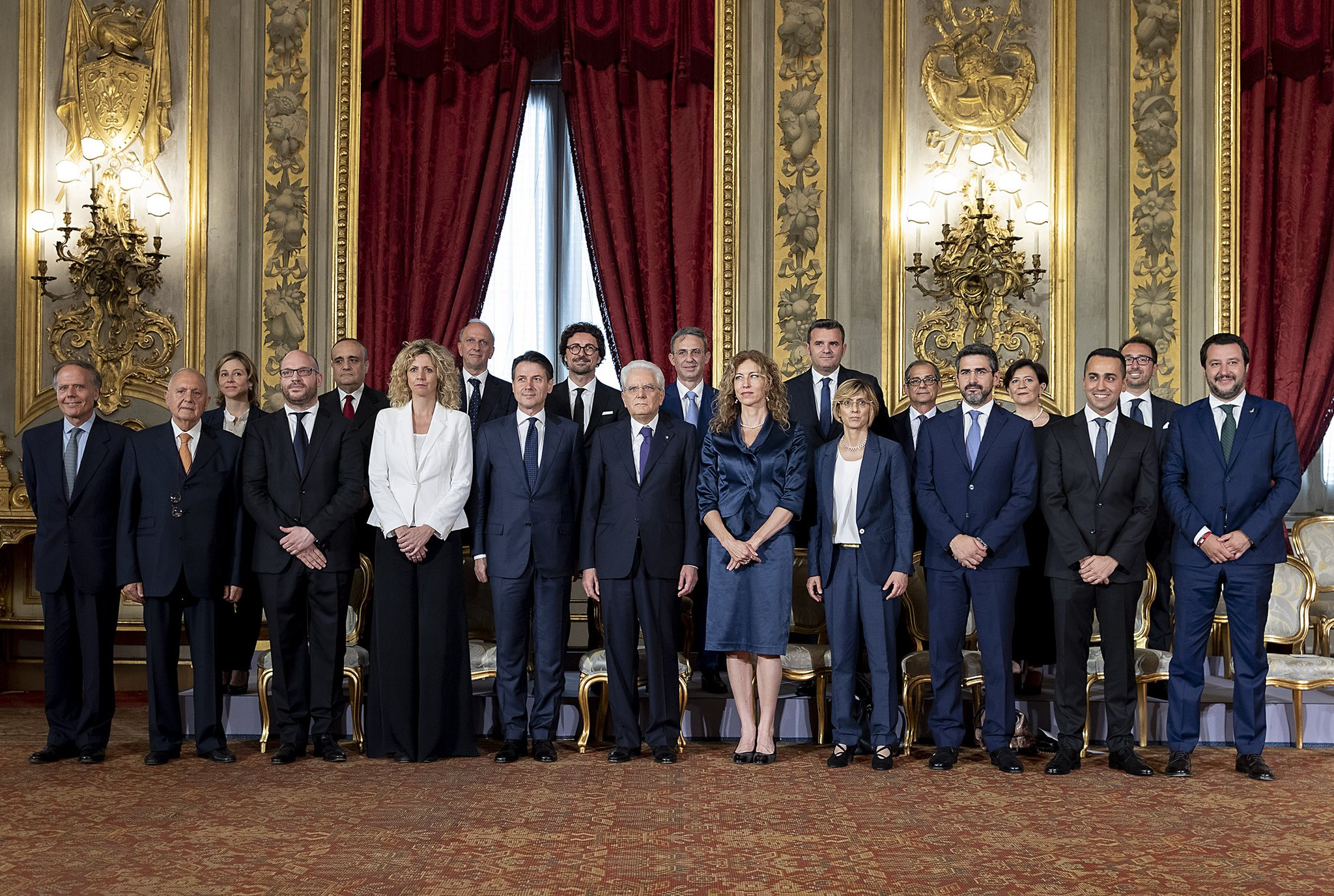
Lezzi is the fourth from the left, on the front row.

== Personal life ==
Lezzi married Rocco Zaminga, an accountant. She gave birth to a son in 2016 named Cristiano Attila.
