= Fabrizio Barca =

Italian civil servant and politician (born 1954)

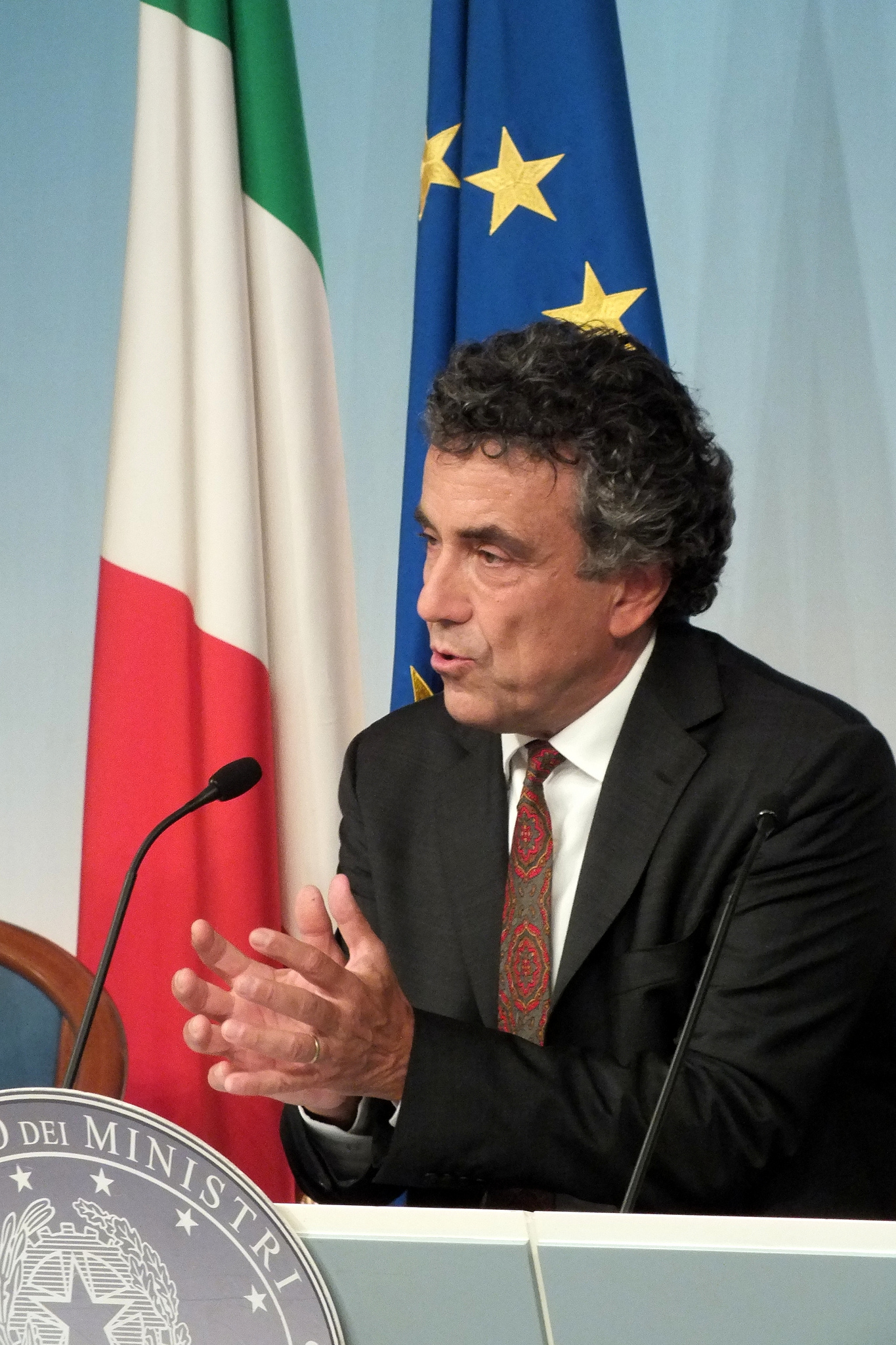

Minister for Territorial Cohesion
- In office 16 November 2011 – 28 April 2013
- Prime Minister: Mario Monti
- Preceded by: Raffaele Fitto
- Succeeded by: Carlo Trigilia

Personal details
- Born: 8 March 1954 (age 72) Turin
- Party: PD (since 2013)
- Education: Sapienza University of Rome; King's College, Cambridge

Fabrizio Barca (born 8 March 1954) is an Italian senior civil servant and politician, who served as a state minister without portfolio for territorial cohesion in the Monti government from 2011 to 2013.

== Early life and education ==
Barca was born in Turin, the son of a senior member of the old Italian Communist Party (PCI). He is a graduate of La Sapienza University of Rome. Barca obtained a MPhil in economics from King's College, Cambridge in 1979. He also carried out research activities at Massachusetts Institute of Technology (MIT) from 1989 to 1990 and at Stanford University in 1994.

== Career ==
Barca is a lecturer in corporate finance and Italian economy history. He worked as a lecturer at the universities of Bocconi, Modena, Paris (SPO), Siena, Rome and Parma. Barca often taught economic development, corporate finance and Italian economic history at these universities. He carried out an interesting study on the Mezzogiorno.

Barca's public posts included the division chief at the research department of the Bank of Italy, chief of the department of development and cohesion policies at the treasury and the president of OECD's territorial policies committee (1999). During his tenure at the Italian treasury, he worked with Carlo Azeglio Ciampi, then treasure minister. In fact, Ciampi appointed Barca to this position. The reason for his appointment was his being part of young leading Italian economists in the 1990s and his reputation which he had gained during his tenure at the Bank of Italy.

Barca worked as a special advisor to the European Union commissioner responsible for regional policy. In April 2009, he developed an independent report for the European Commission, entitled An agenda for a reformed cohesion policy. In addition, Barca was the director of the department of development policies in the Ministry of Economy and Finance until his appointment as minister in 2011.

On 16 November 2011, Barca was appointed minister of territorial cohesion to the cabinet led by Prime Minister Mario Monti. In July 2012, Barca endorsed and launched a new website that was Italy's first national web portal concerning the implementation of investments covering the period of 2007-2013 by regions and state central administrations along with cohesion policy resources. All data therein were published as open data, which makes it Italy's largest open data project. Barca's tenure ended on 28 April 2013, and he was succeeded by Carlo Trigilia in the post. Just before leaving office, Barca joined the Democratic Party in April 2013.

Since 2018, Barca has been coordinator of the Forum Disuguaglianze e Diversità, a civil society organisation aimed at designing public policies and collective actions in order to reduce inequalities and enhance everyone's substantive freedom.

== Work ==
In 2014, Barca published his memoir in which he described the party he desired.

Political offices
Preceded by Raffaele Fitto	Minister for Territorial Cohesion; 2011 – 2013	Succeeded by Carlo Trigilia
