= Conte cabinet =

Conte cabinet may refer to:

- Conte I Cabinet
- Conte II Cabinet
