= Luigi Lucchini =

Italian businessman

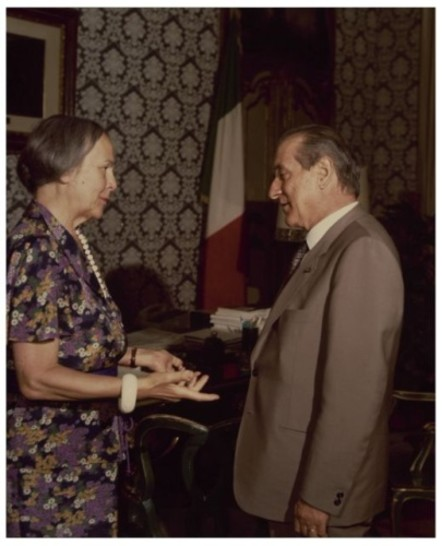
- Lucchini with Nilde Iotti, 1984
- Born: 21 January 1919; Casto, Brescia, Italy
- Died: 26 August 2013 (aged 94)
- Occupations: Businessman, Steel Executive

Luigi Lucchini (21 January 1919 – 26 August 2013) was an Italian businessman and steel executive.

The son of an iron craftsman, Lucchini was born in Casto, Brescia, on 21 January 1919. He studied foreign languages at the Catholic University of Milan but dropped out of university due to financial difficulties; then he worked as a teacher for a brief period and finally he took over his father's workshop in Val Sabbia. After World War II he realized his first extensions of the family business, installing a small mill for the production of rebar. Between the 1970s and the 1980s, the company had its true season of expansion, with the acquisition of several production facilities in and outside Italy.

In 1975 he was appointed Cavaliere del Lavoro, and in later years he entered the Board of Directors of the Banca Commerciale Italiana (of which he became chairman), Montedison (chairman), Compart (chairman), Assicurazioni Generali (of which he became a member of the Executive Committee), Olivetti, Mediobanca and Gemina.

From 1978 to 1983, Lucchini was president of the Industrial Association of Brescia and a member of the board of Confindustria, of which he became the president in 1984. From 1980 to 1982, Lucchini was also part of the EEC Consultative Committee in representation of the European private steel producers. After the sale of the majority stake of the company to Severstal in 2005, Lucchini remained honorary president of the group until 2010, when he announced his retirement.

== Honours ==
- Honoris causa degree in Economics, University of Brescia, 18 June 1998
