= Armando Siri =

Italian politician (born 1971)

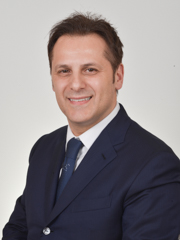

Member of the Senate of the Republic
- Incumbent
- Assumed office 23 March 2018
- Constituency: Emilia Romagna

Personal details
- Born: 10 August 1971 (age 54) Genoa
- Party: League

Armando Siri (born 10 August 1971) is an Italian politician, undersecretary to the Ministry of Transport and senator for the Lega Nord.

On May 8, 2019, Siri was forced out of his position as undersecretary in the Conte Cabinet amid a corruption investigation.

== Bankruptcy ==
Siri established MediaItalia in 2002 with two minority shareholders, Ciro Pesce and Fabrizio Milan. The company produced editorial content for media and corporations, but by 2005 it had accumulated debts of over €1m. However, Siri and his partners transferred the assets to another company, Mafea Communication, without paying even one euro. Siri then appointed Maria Nancy Marte Miniel, a wig-seller, as liquidator.
