= Stefano Buffagni =

Italian politician (born 1983)

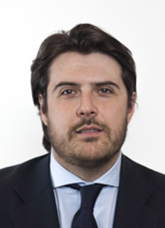
- Buffagni in 2018

Member of the Chamber of Deputies
- In office 23 March 2018 – 12 October 2022
- Constituency: Lombardy 1 – P02

Personal details
- Born: 6 September 1983 (age 42)
- Party: Five Star Movement (since 2010)

Stefano Buffagni (born 6 September 1983) is an Italian politician. From 2018 to 2022, he was a member of the Chamber of Deputies. From 2013 to 2018, he was a member of the Regional Council of Lombardy.
