= Alessio Villarosa =

Italian politician (born 1981)

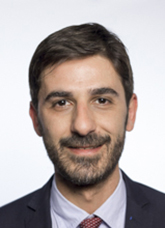
- Villarosa in 2018

Member of the Chamber of Deputies
- In office 15 March 2013 – 12 October 2022
- Constituency: Sicily 2 (2013–2018); Sicily 2 – U02 (2018–2022)

Personal details
- Born: 25 August 1981 (age 44)
- Party: Independent (since 2021)
- Other party: Five Star Movement (2013–2021)

Alessio Mattia Villarosa (born 25 August 1981) is an Italian politician. From 2013 to 2022, he was a member of the Chamber of Deputies. From 2018 to 2021, he served as undersecretary of the Ministry of Economy and Finance.
