= Vincenzo Santangelo =

Italian politician (born 1972)

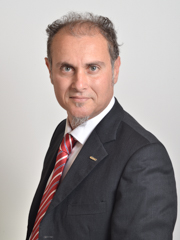
- Santangelo in 2018

Member of the Senate
- In office 15 March 2013 – 12 October 2022
- Constituency: Sicily (2013–2018); Sicily – P01 (2018–2022)

Personal details
- Born: 5 March 1972 (age 54)
- Party: Five Star Movement

Vincenzo Maurizio Santangelo (born 5 March 1972) is an Italian politician. From 2013 to 2022, he was a member of the Senate. From 2018 to 2019, he served as undersecretary for parliamentary relations and direct democracy.
