= Michele Dell'Orco =

Italian politician

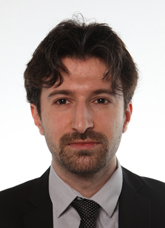
Michele Dell'Orco.

Michele Dell'Orco (born 7 September 1985) is an Italian politician. He was Undersecretary to the Ministry of Infrastructure and Transport from 2018 to 2019.
