= Carlo Trigilia =

Italian politician and academic (born 1951)

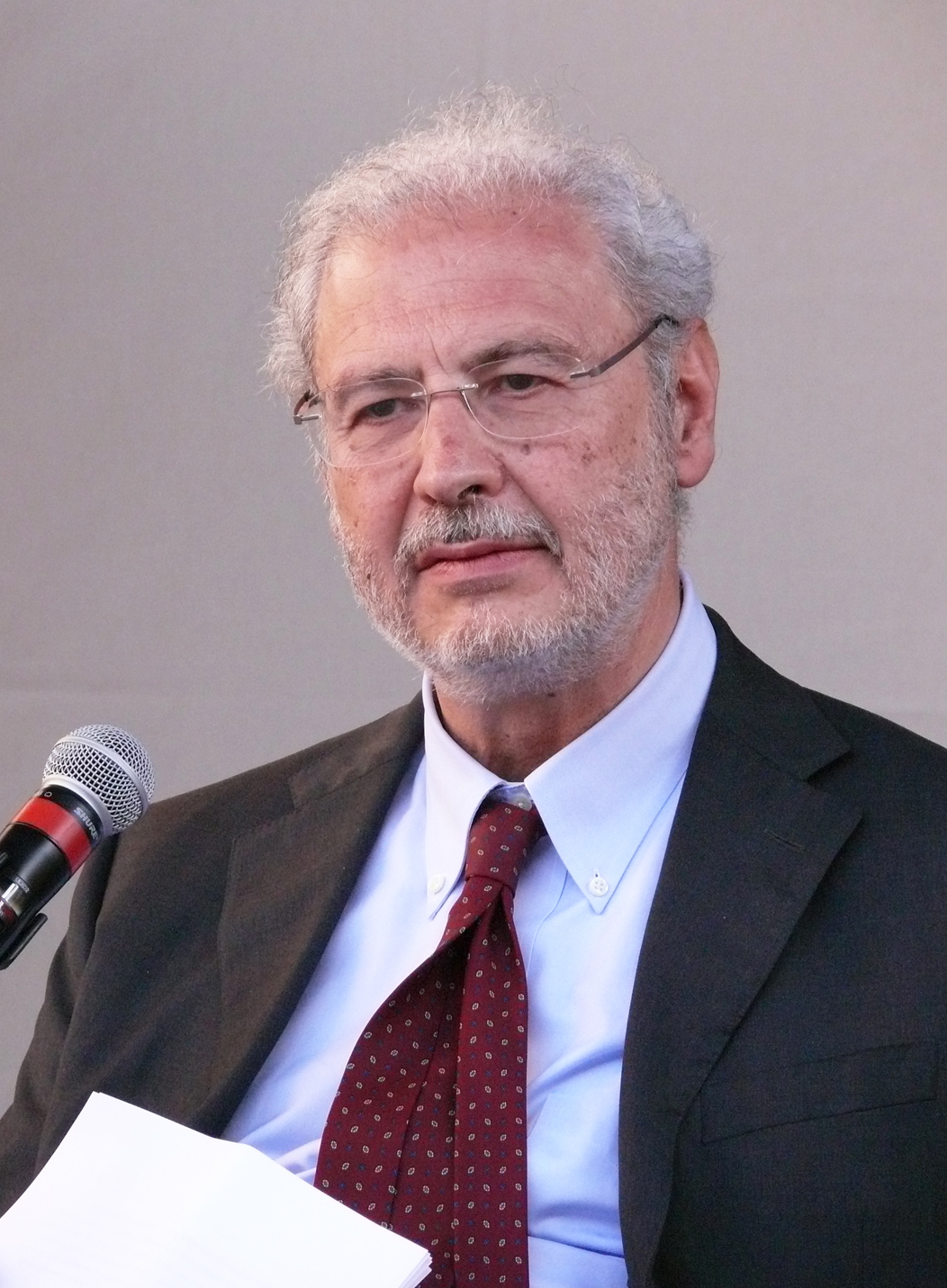

Minister for Territorial Cohesion
- In office 28 April 2013 – 24 February 2014
- Prime Minister: Enrico Letta
- Preceded by: Fabrizio Barca
- Succeeded by: Office not in use (2014-2016)

Personal details
- Born: 18 June 1951 (age 75) Syracuse
- Party: Democratic Party
- Education: University of Florence

Carlo Trigilia (born 18 June 1951) is an Italian academic and politician, who served as minister for territorial cohesion from 28 April 2013 to February 2014. He is a professor emeritus in economic sociology at the University of Florence.

== Early life and education ==
Trigilia was born in Syracuse on 18 June 1951. He graduated from the University of Florence with a degree in sociology in 1974. He was fellow of the American Social Science Research Council (Cornell University and Harvard University).

== Career ==
Trigilia taught at the universities of Palermo, Trento and Harvard. He was professor of economic sociology at the University of Florence. He was De Bosis Professor in history of Italian civilization, Center for European Studies and Department of Sociology at Harvard University in 1995. He was appointed minister of territorial cohesion to the cabinet led by Prime Minister Enrico Letta on 28 April 2013. He is a member of the Academia Nazionale dei Lincei, chair of the RES Research Foundation and editor of an academic journal entitled Stato e Mercato. He was also a member of the editorial board of the journal Il Mulino, and a member of the board of the Associazione il Mulino. He was also a commentator for several newspapers such as Il Sole 24 Ore.

=== Views and works ===
Trigilia developed a landmark European synthesis and definition of economic sociology. For him, economic sociology is "a body of study and research aimed at establishing the links between economic and social phenomena". Therefore, he adopted a comprehensive approach to economics which deals with the role of culture and institutions of economic development.

Trigilia has published many scientific articles and books focusing on economic sociology, on local development in Europe and Italy, with a particular reference to the vision of small-centre development regions (Third Italy) and the backward regions of Mezzogiorno. His books include:Capitalismi e Democrazie. Si possono conciliare crescita e uguaglianza? Bologna, Il Mulino, 2020 (eds) [English translation, Routledge 2022]; Sociologia Economica: Stati, Mercato e Società nel Capitalismo Moderno (Il Mulino, 1978, new edition, 2002 and 2009; English translation: Economic Sociology: State, Market, and Society in Modern Capitalism Balckwell 2002; French translation: Sociologie économique, Paris, Armand Colin, 2002); Local Production Systems in Europe: Rise or Demise ? (with C. Crouch, P. Le Galès, H. Voelzkow, Oxford University Press, 2001); Changing Governance of local economies: Responses of European Local Production Systems (with C. Crouch, P. Le Galès, H. Voelzkow, Oxford, Oxford University Press, 2004); La construction sociale du marché. Le défi de la troisième Italie, (with A. Bagnasco, Cachan: Editions de l'Ens, 1995).
