= Giulia Grillo =

Italian physician and politician

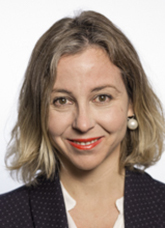

Minister of Health
- In office 1 June 2018 – 5 September 2019
- Prime Minister: Giuseppe Conte
- Preceded by: Beatrice Lorenzin
- Succeeded by: Roberto Speranza

Member of the Chamber of Deputies
- In office 15 March 2013 – 12 October 2022
- Constituency: Sicily 2

Personal details
- Born: 30 May 1975 (age 51) Catania, Sicily, Italy
- Party: Five Star Movement
- Education: University of Catania
- Profession: Physician

Giulia Grillo (born 30 May 1975) is an Italian physician and politician who served as the Italian Minister of Health from 1 June 2018 to 5 September 2019. A member of the Five Star Movement, she has served as a member of the Chamber of Deputies since 15 March 2013.

== Background ==
Born in Catania, Grillo studied medicine and surgery at the University of Catania. She later studied at the Università Cattolica del Sacro Cuore in 2014.

== Political career ==
Grillo originally became interested in politics due to the influence of Beppe Grillo (no known relation), the founder of the Five Star Movement. She stood for the Sicilian regional election in 2008, but failed to be elected.

In 2013, she was elected as a member of the Five Star Movement in the Italian general election to the Chamber of Deputies; she was reelected in the general election of 2018.

In contrast to some members of her party who doubt the effectiveness of vaccines, Grillo believes that vaccines are necessary, but has expressed some trepidation about mandatory vaccinations for children, preferring instead a strategy of convincing distrustful parents about the necessity of vaccinations. In addition, Grillo has also criticised the perceived closeness between vaccine manufacturers and the Italian Medicines Agency.

On 1 June 2018, she was sworn in as Minister of Health in the Conte Cabinet, under Prime Minister Giuseppe Conte. With the formation of the Conte II Cabinet in September 2019, she left the government.

== See also ==
- Conte Cabinet
- Five Star Movement
