= University of Brescia =

University in Brescia, Italy

- Università degli Studi di Brescia
- Logo of the University of Brescia
- Type: Public
- Established: 1982
- Rector: Prof. Franco Castelli
- Administrative staff: 500
- Students: 16,800
- Location: Brescia, Italy; 45°32′17″N 10°13′04″E
- Campus: Urban
- Sport teams: CUS Brescia www.cusbrescia.it
- Website: www.unibs.it

The University of Brescia (Italian: Università degli Studi di Brescia) is an Italian public research university located in Brescia, Italy. It was founded in 1982 and is branched in 4 Faculties.

The University of Brescia was officially established in 1982 with three Schools: Medicine and Surgery, Engineering, Economics and Business. However, the creation phase lasted nearly two decades, so the first attempts to open university courses in Brescia go back to the 1960s.

University rankings

Global – Overall
- QS World: =650 (2026)

== History ==
Although founded in 1982, the university traces its roots to separate institutions of higher education. There was an initial proposal to open a branch campus of the Polytechnic University of Milan offering engineering since the early 1960s but it only started in 1969 when it received the backing of the city mayor and the local government. The university's Department of Economics and Management traces its beginnings to a two-year course started in 1964 by the Brescia Industrial Association and validated by the University of Parma. The two institutions were consolidated into the new University of Brescia, which was granted degree-awarding powers as a fully independent comprehensive university. During the 1990s, the university expanded and purchased various properties across the city, including the historic monastery next to the Church of Saints Faustino e Giovita.

== Organization ==
The University of Brescia is divided into four main areas and provides the following post-secondary academic degrees:

- University of Brescia
  - Economics
    - First cycle (Laurea):
      - Banking and Finance
      - Business Administration
      - Economics
    - Second cycle (Laurea Magistrale):
      - Business Consultancy and Training for Professionals
      - Management
      - Money, Finance and Risk Management
    - Third cycle (PhD):
      - Analytics in Economics and Management
  - Engineering
    - First cycle (Laurea):
      - Civil Engineering
      - Computer Science and Engineering
      - Electronics and Telecommunications Engineering
      - Environmental and Land Engineering
      - Industrial Automation Engineering
      - Management Engineering
      - Mechanical and Materials Engineering
    - Second cycle (Laurea Magistrale):
      - Architectural Engineering
      - Civil Engineering
      - Civil and Environmental Engineering
      - Communication Technologies and Multimedia
      - Computer Science and Engineering
      - Electronics Engineering
      - Industrial Automation Engineering
      - Land and Environmental Engineering
      - Management Engineering
      - Mechanical Engineering
      - Mechanical Engineering of Materials
  - Law
    - First cycle (Laurea):
      - Employment and Company Legal Advisor
    - Second cycle (Laurea Magistrale):
      - Law
  - Medicine and Surgery
    - First cycle (Laurea):
      - Biomedical Laboratory Techniques
      - Biotechnologies
      - Dental Hygiene
      - Dietistic
      - Environment and Workplace Prevention Techniques
      - Exercise and Sport Sciences
      - Health Assistance
      - Imaging and Radiotherapy Techniques
      - Midwifery
      - Nursing
      - Physiotherapy
      - Professional Education
      - Psychiatric Rehabilitation Techniques
    - Second cycle (Laurea Magistrale):
      - Medical Biotechnology
      - Medicine and Surgery
      - Nursing and Midwifery Sciences
      - School of Dentistry
      - Science and Technology for Population Health and Wealth
      - Sciences and Techniques of Preventive and Adapted Physical Activities

== Notable people ==
=== Rectors ===
- Augusto Preti (7 November 1983 – 11 November 2010)
- Sergio Pecorelli (11 November 2010 – 31 October 2016)
- Maurizio Tira (1 November 2016 – 31 October 2022)
- Francesco Castelli (since 1 November 2022)

=== Degree honoris causa ===
- Luigi Lucchini, Economics (18 June 1998)
- Paul Greengard, Medicine (September 2007)
- Guido Calabresi, Law (21 January 2013)
- Jeffrey Sachs, Management (12 February 2018)
- Manilo Milani, Law (17 February 2020)
- Jeffrey Hangst, Mechanical Engineering (16 December 2024)

=== Alumni ===
- Mariastella Gelmini
- Danilo Toninelli

== Gallery ==
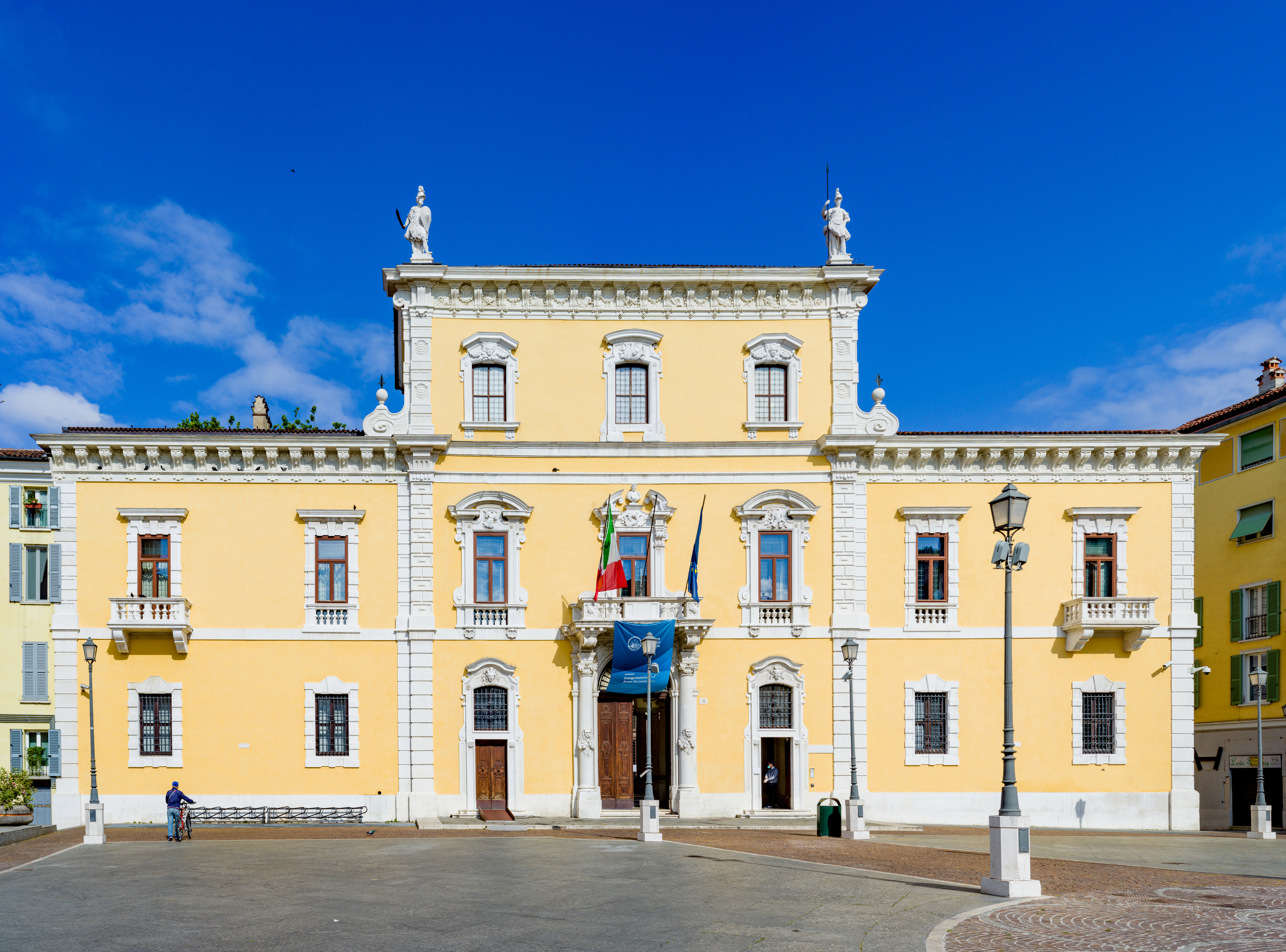
Palazzo Martinengo, seat of the Rectorate

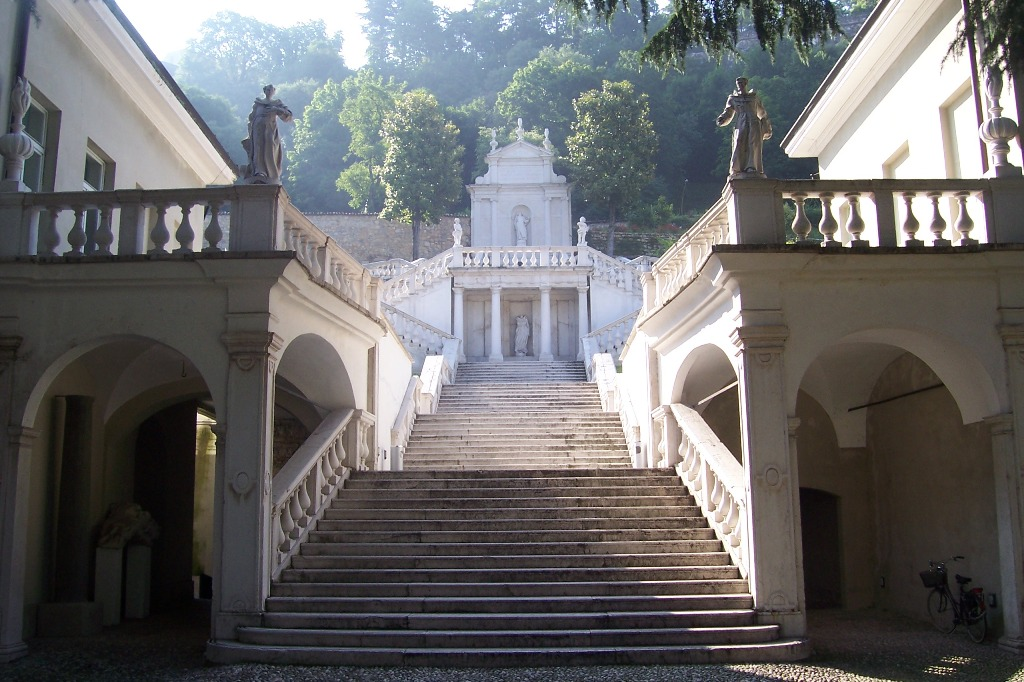
Faculty of Economics

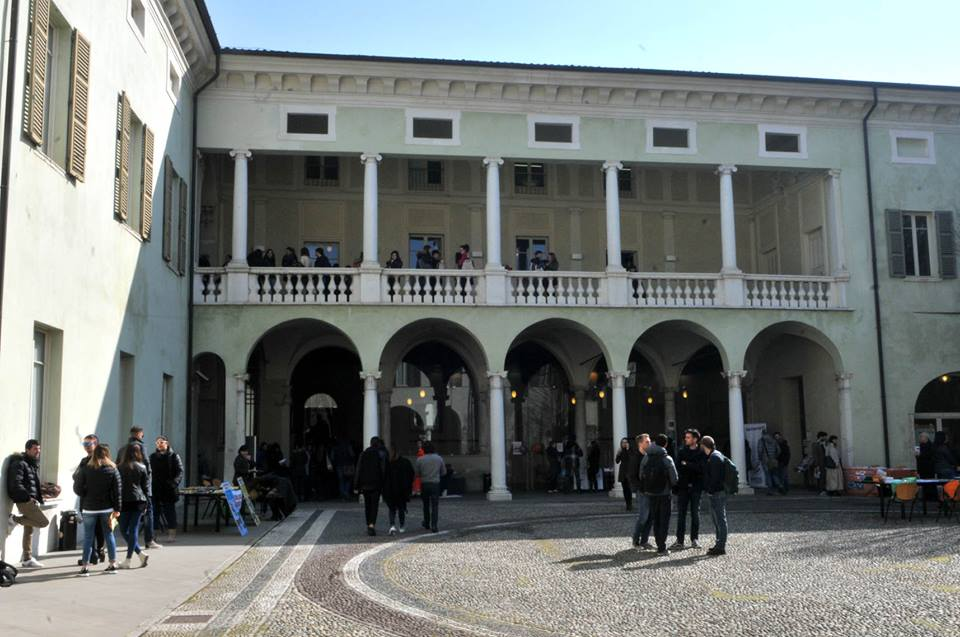
Faculty of Law

== See also ==
- List of Italian universities
